= Zakynthos horse =

Greek equine breed

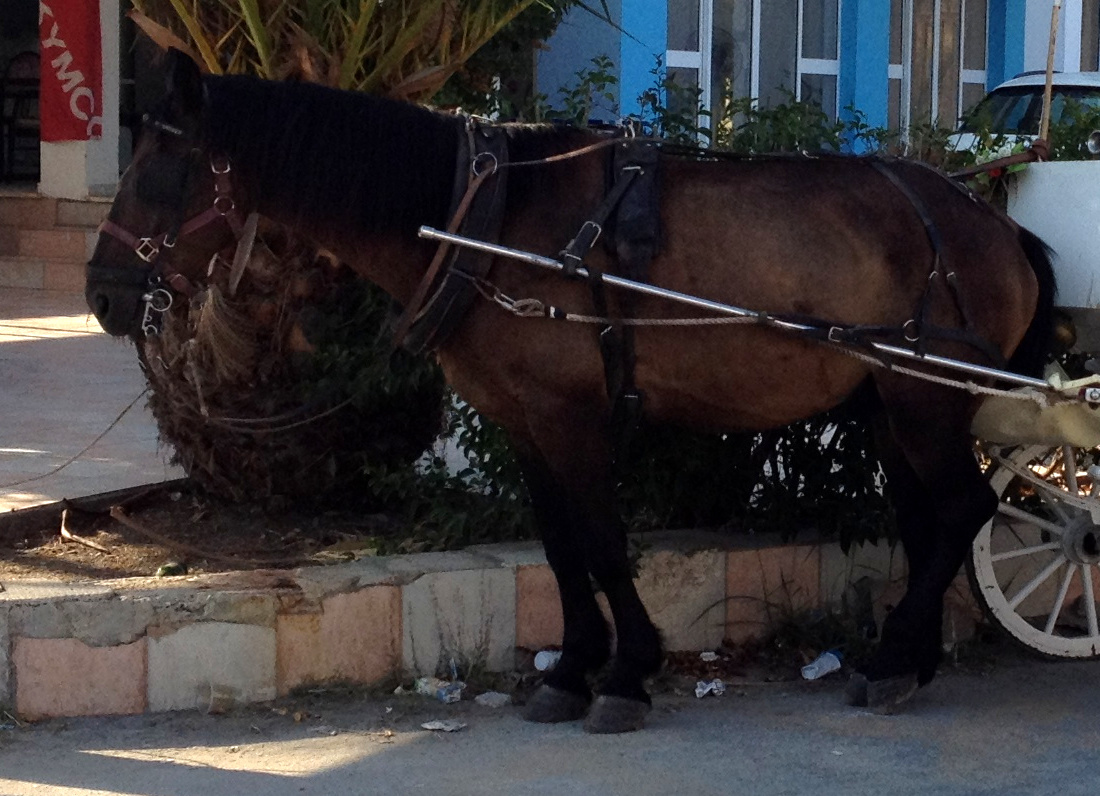
- Zakynthos harnessed to Alykés, on the island of Zante.
- Country of origin: Greece
- Use: Combined driving and equestrian tourism

Traits
- Height: From 1.45 m to 1.55 m
- Color: Black
- Color: Black

The Zakynthos (Modern Greek: άλογο της Ζακύνθου; English: Zante horse) is a breed of generally black saddle and combined driving horses originating from the island of Zante, one of the Ionian Islands, in Greece. The origin of this breed is very recent, dating back to the 20th century. This breed is of Anglo-Arabian type and is genetically close to the Andravida. Genetic analysis shows that it has been crossed with the Thoroughbred. The Zakynthos may also be descended from the Nivernais-type Percheron. Its type remains unstable, and the breed has no official standards or identification documents.

The Zakynthos is described as the most beautiful of Greek horses. It is used as a horse-drawn vehicle and for equestrian tourism, the latter use however endangering the island's loggerhead turtles (Caretta caretta) during beach rides. Presumably rare, these horses are bred by a few families on the island of Zante.

== Denomination ==
"Zakynthos" is the local Greek name for these horses and the English translation would be "Zante horse". They are also known as "cheval de Zante" in French. German-speaking author Jasper Nissen calls them Zakynthos-rappe, which could be translated as "black Zakynthos" in English.

== History ==
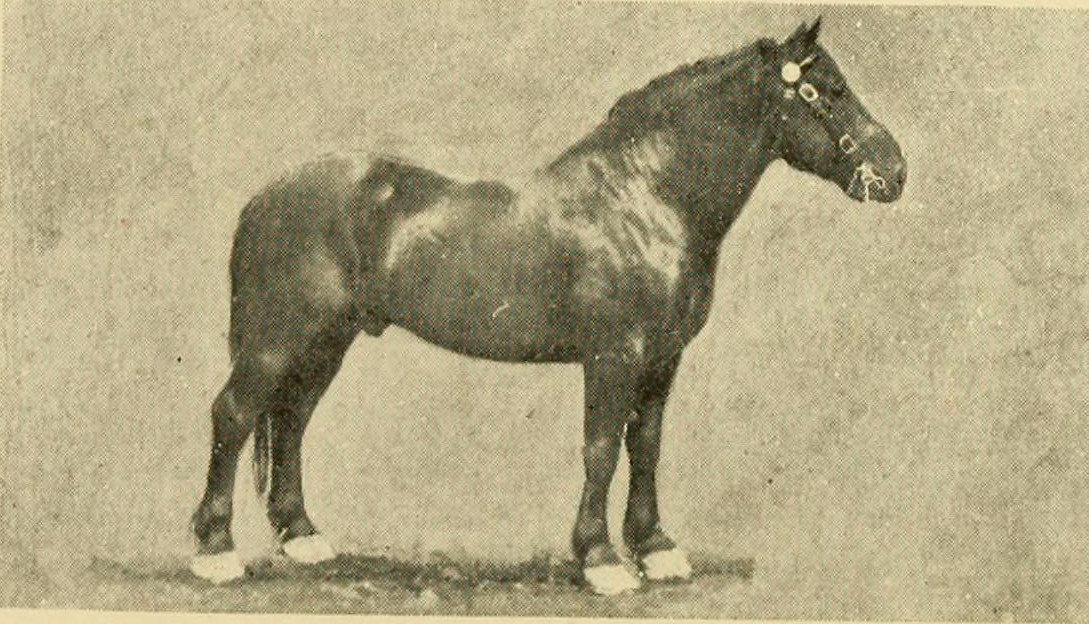
Nivernais stallion in Les races chevalines françaises et anglaises, published in 1910. A stallion of Nivernais stock is said to have influenced the Zakynthos breed.

The existence of Zakynthos dates back to the 20th century. However, the breeding and usage of horses on the island of Zakynthos is mentioned earlier.

An ancient Greek poet of the 4th century BC, Simonides of Zakynthos, states that horse-breeding does not correspond to this island, which Dr. Richard Rawles interprets it as a reference to Homer's texts which mention the presence of horses on other Greek islands.

The existence of horse races was mentioned on the island of Zante in 1835.

According to CAB International, today's Zakynthos horses are the result of crossbreeding the island's local Andravida mares with Anglo-Arabian stallions at the beginning of the 20th century, particularly in the 1900s during the interwar period. Archaeozoologist Theodore Antikas believes that the original strain imported to the island came from Elis, with a continuation of these imports during the interwar period, this time involving Anglo-Arabians from France and England.

For Jasper Nissen, the breed was created after World War II. As the Greek horse population collapsed as a result of the Greek Civil War, Greek immigrants in the USA are said to have sent a black Percheron stallion to family and friends on the island of Zakynthos. Nissen believes that this stallion was a different model from the modern French Percheron, being a descendant of the Nivernais draft horses exported as Percherons at the end of the 19th century. In crossbreeding with the island's small local mares, this stallion would have transmitted its physical characteristics in a remarkable way.

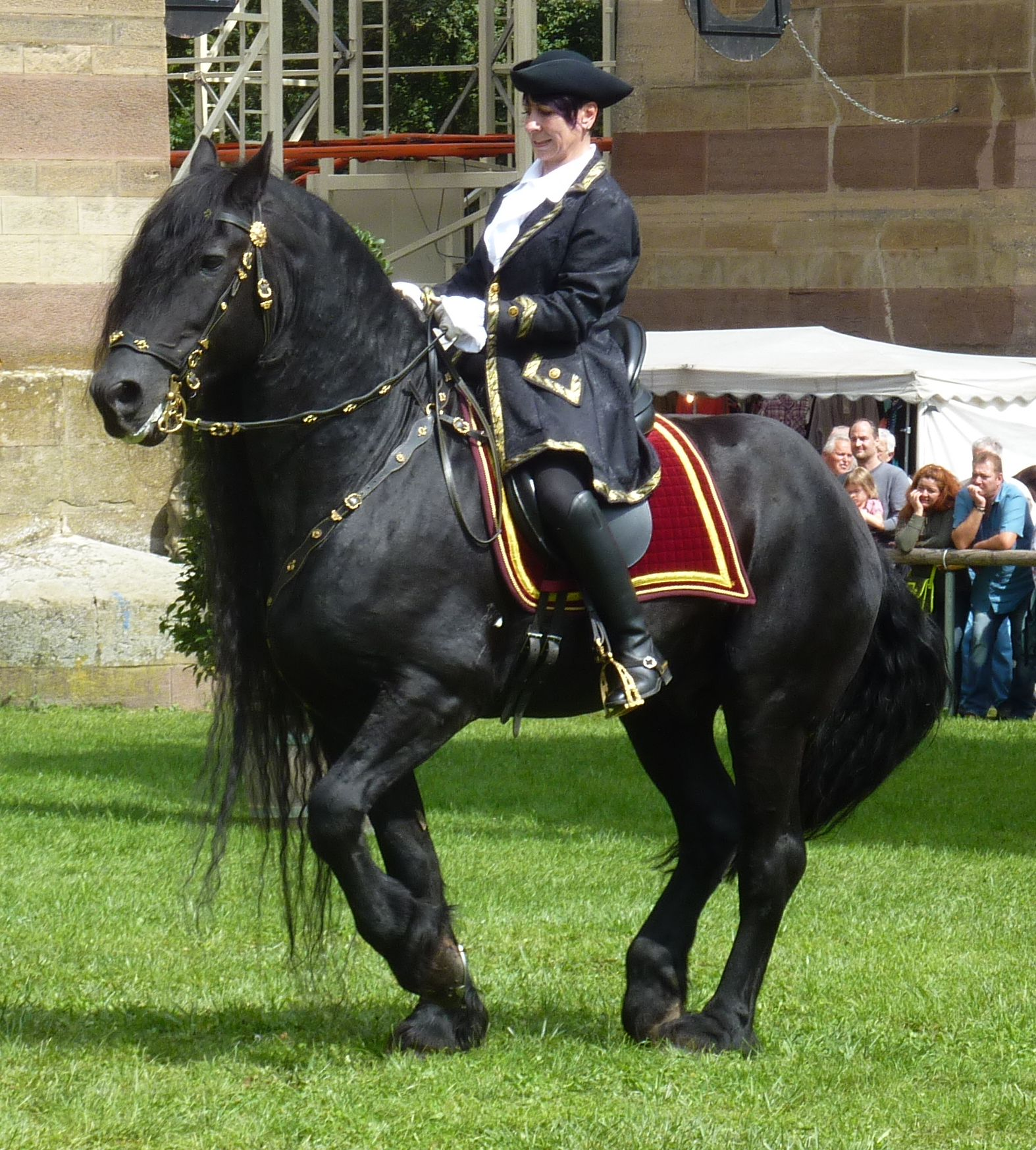
A Friesian, a breed imported to the island of Zakynthos at the beginning of the 21st century.

The herd was also influenced by Thoroughbred stallions imported from England. This type of crossing is common not only on the island of Zakynthos, but also among the neighboring Andravida and Thessalian breeds, as the cross with the Thoroughbred stallion is reputed to produce a valuable foal. The Zante horses resulting from these crosses are then presented locally as Anglo-Arabian. However, they are not officially recognized. Since the beginning of the 21st century, imports of Friesian and Andalusian horses have replaced previous imports.

== Description ==
The Zakynthos is one of seven horse breeds identified in Greece.

Archaeozoologist Theodore Antikas, Prof. Menegatos of the University of Athens and the Delachaux guide (probably copying the latter) indicate an average height of 1.45 m to 1.55 m. The Greek biodiversity protection association Amalthia, on its website, indicates a size of 1.45 m to 1.65 m.

The breed remains unstable in type, and has neither a standard nor official recognition by the Greek Ministry of Agriculture. The model is relatively large (Nissen describes a medium size) and powerful. Antikas describes an Anglo-Arabian type. These horses are renowned for their elegance and are often considered the most beautiful in Greece. The coat is most often black, or a very dark bay according to Antikas, but other colors may be represented. Gaits are described as excellent. The breeding objective is to produce a large, elegant black horse. Because of its living conditions, the Zakynthos is relatively frugal and robust.

=== Genetic analysis ===
Two genetic analyses carried out in 2005 and 2010 by Prof. E. G. Cothran and Rytis Juras on native Greek horse breeds show a close relationship between the Zakynthos and the Andravida, with the two breeds being slightly further removed from Greek ponies such as the Skyros and the Thessalian. The phylogenetic tree modeled by Cothran and Juras thus places the Zakynthos in the same gene cluster as the Thoroughbred.

The genetic diversity of Zakynthos is quite good.

== Usage ==
These horses are still used for transportation on their island, as well as for combined driving and equestrian tourism. They pull phaetons (paetonia) for tourists.

They can also be ridden. They have been taking part in the horse fair held in Andravida since the 1930s, where they have won several prizes.

Several studies point out that horse-riding tourism along the beaches of the island of Zakynthos endangers the Caretta caretta (loggerhead) sea turtles that nest there (among other factors), in particular due to the destruction of breeding grounds by trampling horses' hooves.

== Spread of breeding ==
The Zakynthos is unique to its island of origin, where it is bred by local families, and is not widely distributed elsewhere. The breed is probably very rare, but no official count is available. The breed has no official identification documents, is not listed in the DAD-IS database. The level of threat to Zakynthos is unknown.

== See also ==
- List of horse breeds
- Zakynthos island
- Nivernais horse

== Bibliography ==
- Kugler, Waltraud; Monitoring Institute (2009). Rare Breeds and Varieties of Greece: Atlas 2010 (PDF). Montricher: Institute for Rare Breeds and Seeds in Europe.
- Nissen, Jasper (2003). Enzyklopädie der Pferderassen (in German). Vol. 3. Kosmos. ISBN 3-440-09723-4.
- Porter, Valerie; Alderson, Lawrence; Hall, Stephen J. G.; Sponenberg, Dan Phillip (2016). Mason's World Encyclopedia of Livestock Breeds and Breeding (6th ed.). CAB International. ISBN 978-1-84593-466-8.
- Porter, Valerie (2020). Mason's World Dictionary of Livestock Breeds, Types and Varieties (6th ed.). CAB International. ISBN 978-1-78924-153-2.
- Rousseau, Élise (2016). Guide des chevaux d'Europe (in French). Delachaux et Niestlé. ISBN 978-2-603-02437-9.
