= Berrichon horse =

Extinct French horse

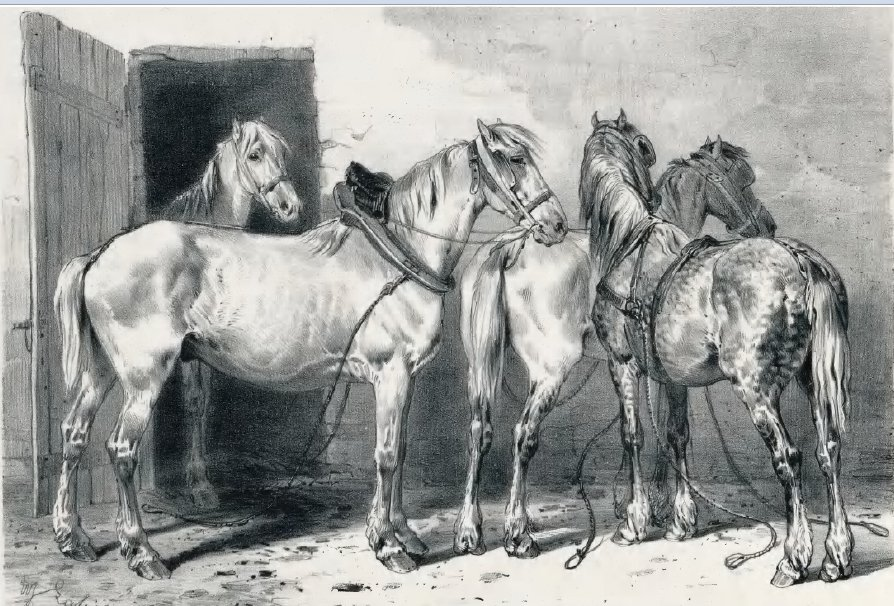
Berrichon horses in the Statistical Atlas of Horse Production in France, 1850

The Berrichon was an extinct breed of ponies and later draft horses, originally bred in the Berry region of France. References to the breed date back to the Middle Ages, though it likely did not constitute a distinct breed at that time. By the 18th century, the horse fair at Sancerre gained significant renown, attracting buyers from as far as Normandy. George Sand noted the existence of a Brennou horse in the ponds of the Brenne area during the mid-19th century. These small, hardy horses were raised outdoors year-round and were ridden by children in local races.

Initially small in stature, the Berrichon evolved into a medium-sized draft horse by the turn of the 20th century, heavily influenced by the Percheron. Despite being considered unattractive and slow, with large heads, these horses were valued for their vigor and gentle temperament. They were notably used to pull omnibuses in Paris.

A stud book was established in 1923, with a breeding syndicate formalized the following year. The breed was selectively bred until 1932, when the stud book was closed, allowing crossings only with Percherons. After a brief period of local popularity, the Berrichon declined due to competition from the Percheron in agriculture and absorption through crossbreeding to produce half-bred horses. The Berrichon was fully integrated into the Percheron breed by 1966.

== History ==
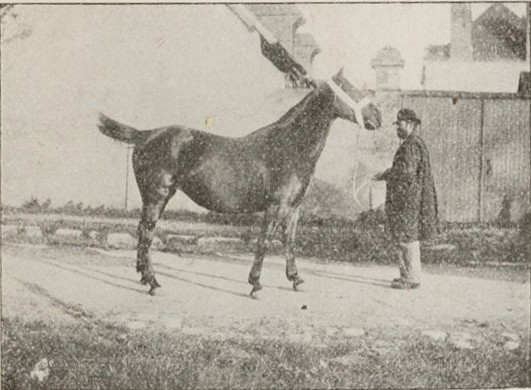
Half-bred Berrichon in 1905

=== Origins ===
Military veterinarian Charles-Louis-Maurice Cormier (1905) suggested that the Berrichon horse was influenced by the Arabian horses of the Moors and Germanic horses. According to Dr. Cordeau's 1946 thesis, the Berrichon was not native to its breeding region; it descended from the ancient horse of Sologne, a small, lean, but hardy animal. Its status as a distinct breed was debated multiple times. According to Paul Diffloth, before the French Revolution, Berry horses were likely common bidet type horses.

=== Middle Ages ===
The quality of Berry horses was recognized as early as the Middle Ages. According to Henri Trotignon, "until the era of Louis XIV, they were considered among the best." Under Philip II Augustus, the conflict with England over Berry (1187–1189) likely led to interbreeding with horses from that region. The Hundred Years' War devastated the region's equine breeding. In the 15th century, a carter's daily wage with his horses was only 3 to 4 sols, suggesting the animals were of low value.

=== 17th and 18th centuries ===
Equine breeding in Berry is documented in the 16th century. In 1601, Sully sent horses from his stud at Mehun-sur-Yèvre to Henry IV, who claimed to provide his finest specimens to Queen Elizabeth I. Breeding likely declined under Louis XIII. In 1701, Abbot Sauvageot of Sennely described the local breed as small thin, weak, and short. The establishment of national studs supported breeding, improving the quality of horses in the 18th century. Berry stallions were often approved animals owned by stud keepers. Royal studs were established in Berry in 1704 and organized in 1766, with a Danish stallion introduced. The founding of the Pompadour National Stud in 1763 influenced Berry. By 1789, 24 approved stallions were owned by keepers, with up to 50 previously housed in the province. In his Statistical Memoir of the Indre Department, Prefect François Dalphonse noted the high quality of Berry horse fairs, particularly Sancerre, which attracted Normandy buyers. These horses were known for their precocity, maturing at three years, and supplied the military remount.

=== 19th century ===
After the dissolution of the national studs, the Statistical Memoir of the Cher Department reported breeding primarily small draft horses suitable as artillery horses. The best specimens came from northern Sancerrois. Generally, breeding was conducted without particular care or training. Local stud stallions included English, Norman, Cauchois, Limousin, Anglo-Norman, Brandenburger, and Arabian, particularly Persian. In 1823, the Cher prefect introduced breeding premiums for mares bred with approved or national stallions. In 1830, similar premiums were established in the Indre department. No draft horse breeding was noted in the region then; only one Cauchois draft horse was recorded between 1820 and 1830.

In 1834, the Blois National Stud sent stallions to improve the local stock. A breeding station was established in Ivoy-le-Pré in 1835, with five stations by 1850, housing Limousin and Arabian saddle horses, draft horses, 11 Thoroughbreds, and 66 Norman carriage horses. Mare selection was neglected; in 1844, the merits of Thoroughbred crossings were debated. Demand for draft stallions included Poitevins, Nivernais, and Bretons. In 1851, a stallion station was established at Vailly. According to Eugène Gayot, the dominant Berry horse was a powerful and fast post horse. By 1850, per Jean-Henri Magne, Berry lacked a distinct horse breed. Breeders bought foals, mainly Poitevins, chosen by stagecoach drivers without regard for specific traits or coat color. Mare contests were held in the 1870s in Sancoins, Vailly, Nérondes, and Lignières, with a budget of 3,000 old franc divided among four categories. In the 1880s, these premiums increased. The Blois stud director opposed introducing draft horses, favoring half-bred warhorses, as did authorities. However, by 1885, local breeders demanded draft stallions, and three were distributed. By the 1890s, draft horse numbers grew, influenced by Anglo-Norman, Limousin horse, Poitevin draft, Nivernais, Norfolk Trotter, Percheron, Boulonnais, and Ardennais. Disputes arose between supporters of Percheron and Ardennais crossings; Cordeau (1946) argued the Percheron's climate and geology were closer to Berry's. From the 1890s, regional national studs imported only Percherons.

A specific breed in the Brenne region was noted. Eugène Gayot recommended letting the Brennou horse disappear due to its defective morphology. This breed vanished through crossbreeding. Norfolk Trotter horses were introduced in large numbers to Berry (Cher and Indre) in the late 19th and early 20th centuries for breeding.

Berry's mare population comprised Poitevin, Breton, and Percheron draft horses. The Berrichon was less esteemed than the Percheron, though some sources noted their similarity. Recent sources suggest kinship with the Limousin horse, a saddle horse. In southern France, it had a good reputation.

=== 20th century ===
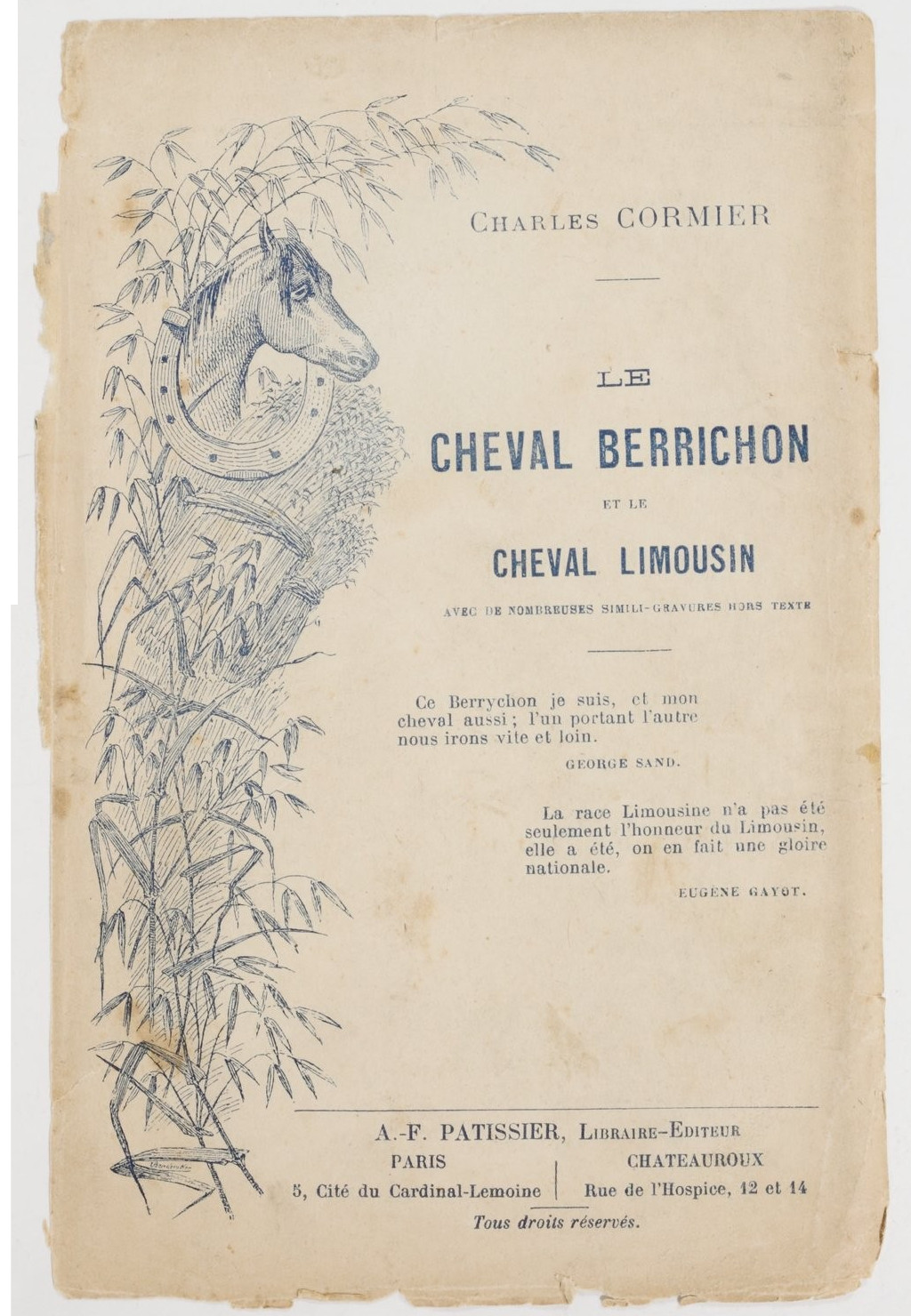
Cover of Charles Cormier's Le cheval Berrichon et le cheval Limousin, 1905

In the 1900s, many draft horses were born in the Cher department, primarily for private industry using Percheron stallions. Some Berry regions produced "half-bred Berrichons" by crossing with Thoroughbred stallions.

In 1913, a Berrichon Hippic Syndicate was formed in La Guerche, becoming operational after World War I. In 1923, the stud book for the Berrichon draft horse was opened. The following year, a "Berrichon draft horse breeding syndicate" was established in Bourges, covering the Cher and Indre departments, inspired by Percheron selection methods. The stud book's initial regulations allowed horse registrations until December 31, 1926, extended to December 31, 1929.

In 1924 and 1925, many Percheron fillies were imported, especially to La Chapelotte and Sens-Beaujeu, creating a Percheron breed stronghold. The stud book closed to non-Berrichon or non-Percheron horses on January 1, 1932. Recognized as a breed, the Berrichon competed in regional contests, notably at Sens-Beaujeu, and entered national studs like Charenton-du-Cher. During the interwar period, breeding declined due to motorization. Heavier draft horses, particularly Percherons, were favored by farmers. The army was encouraged to buy horses to support breeders. In 1939, Commander de Rancourt advocated using the "Sancerrois bidet" against Nazi Germany. By 1946, Berry horses remained diverse, partly due to Ardennais refugees' horses after the French debacle of 1940.

The Berrichon was absorbed into half-bred crosses with Anglo-Norman and Anglo-Arabian horses. The draft type merged with the Percheron in 1966, alongside the Augeron, Maine, Nivernais, Bourbonnais, Loire, and Saône-et-Loire horse.

== Description ==
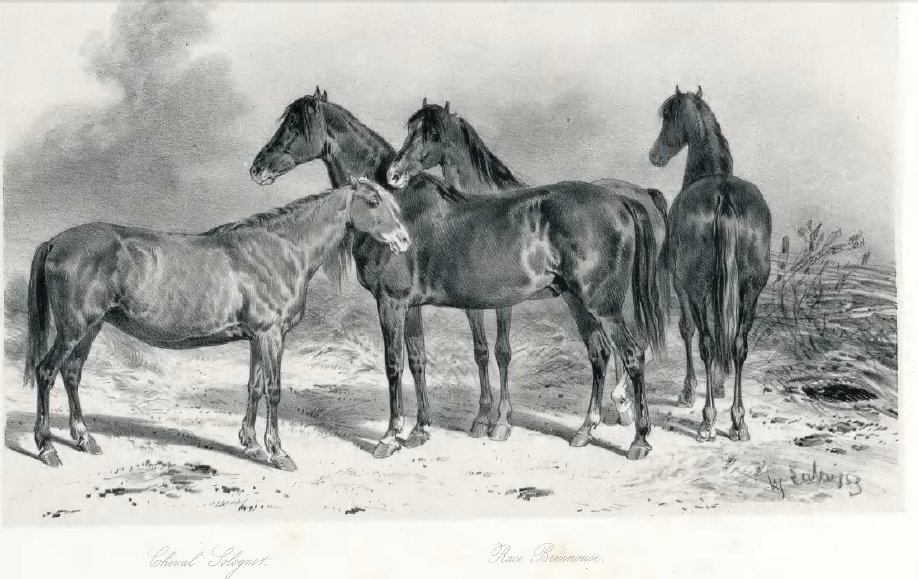
Solognot and Brennou horse.

=== Morphology ===
==== Historical descriptions ====
Historically, Berrichon horses varied greatly in size and conformation. According to Eugène Gayot (1861), the Brennou horse ranged from 1.10 m to 1.45 m; a later source by Gayot cites 1.40 m to 1.45 m. In 1905, Charles Cormier described Berrichon mares as 1.50 m to 1.55 m. Horses from Sancerre, Blois, and Saint-Amand-Montrond were stronger than those from Loches, Le Blanc, and La Châtre. Horses in fertile areas along the Allier and Loire rivers were taller than those in less fertile southern regions. Sancerre horses were suited for harness work, being both strong and light.

Berrichon horses were described as broad but with short limbs. They had the compact form of common horses. George Sand described Brennou horses with open nostrils, high and broad chests, excellent stamina, slender and hollow limbs, solid flanks, and wide chests. Eugène Gayot noted a large, square, poorly attached head with prominent jowls and eyes. Critics highlighted their small size and slowness, though their limbs were of high quality. The breed was deemed unattractive. Prefect Dalphonse described them as small, with a heavy, short head, short and thick neck, low and rounded withers, heavy shoulders, fine croup, well-built body, and slender, sinewy legs.

In the early 20th century, Charles Cormier described Berrichon mares with expressive, straight-profile heads, short and well-attached necks, low withers, sloping shoulders, solid toplines, good hips, but some toed-out legs. In 1910, Louis Morisot described them as broad, with strong necks, well-supported toplines, solid limbs with regular conformation, long forearms, well-muscled thighs, low knees and hocks, and short cannons. The croup was slightly oval but well-muscled. In 1923, zootechnician Paul Diffloth described powerful, bony mares with large heads.

==== Berrichon Stud book standard ====
The Berrichon stud book set a precise standard, with heights from 1.58 m to 1.70 m, averaging 1.60 m. The breed was straight-profiled and hypermétric, with a strong, well-developed skeleton, closely resembling the Percheron.

The head profile was straight with a slightly convex chamfer, broad forehead, large and lively eyes, and well-placed ears. In practice, the head was less refined with open nostrils. The throat was slender and unobtrusive. The neck was long and powerful (though finer in practice), with a muscular, free, and well-directed shoulder enabling extended gaits. Arms and forearms were muscular, withers prominent, back short, straight, and well-attached, and loins muscular. The chest was open, ribcage ample and deep, ribs round and long, flanks well-connected, hips wide and long, with a straight, powerful, sometimes double croup. The tail was preferably high-set but often low. The belly was slightly tucked. Thighs were well-descended, joints broad, limbs strong and well-aligned, cannons short, tendons dry, and feet with high heels. Hocks were slightly bent. Accepted coat colors were preferably dappled gray, black, and rarely chestnut or bay.

=== Temperament and maintenance ===
In the 19th century, these horses were continually exposed to seasonal weather. Described as "gentle and honest," they were known for vigor. George Sand noted their robustness despite minimal care or substantial feed. They could travel 40 to 50 km (31 mi) without strain and up to 100 to 120 km (75 mi) daily. Early 20th-century Berrichons were noted for stamina and power. The breed's fertility rate ranged from 50 to 70%.

=== Selection ===
Horses registered in the stud book were branded on the left neck under the mane with the letters "S.B." The breed syndicate conducted annual inspections in early September at branding centers, with branded horses gaining significant value. Only stud book-registered horses could compete in breed contests and claim premiums. In 1946, stallion premiums ranged from 2,000 to 5,000 old francs. Foal contests were held every August 15 in about ten Berry localities.

Breeding occurred from February to June.

== Uses ==
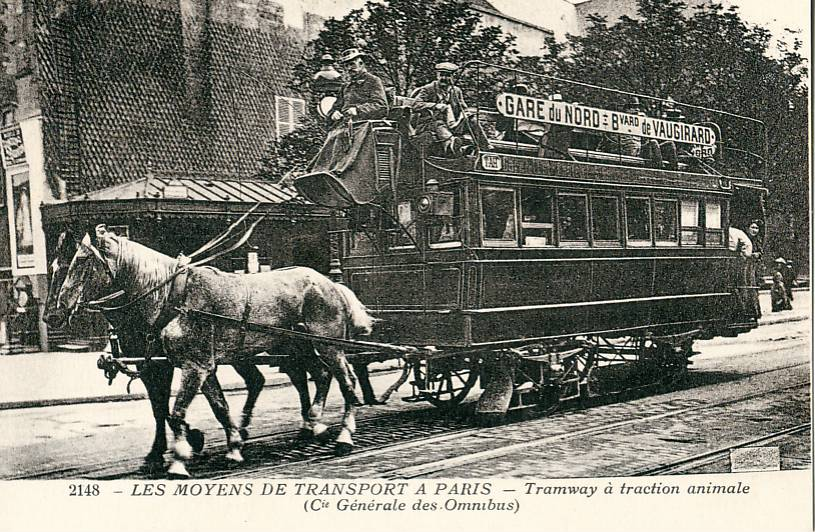
The Compagnie Générale des Omnibus used Berrichon horses (the breed of the horses in the photo is unknown).

In the mid-19th century, George Sand described local horse races in Brenne where children rode these horses, called cavarnier races. Young boys raised, cared for, and tamed their wild horses, competing barefoot, hatless, without jackets, and often using only a rope for control. Draft horse use in Berry agriculture grew in the late 19th century, replacing oxen.

The Berrichon was primarily a draft and agricultural horse. It was suitable for pulling post carriages. In southern France, it served stagecoaches. Larger specimens were purchased by the Compagnie Générale des Omnibus in Paris; between 1855 and 1900, 6% of their 103,000 horses were Berrichons. The company recorded a 6.7% mortality rate for Berrichons, lower than Percherons but higher than Cauchois, attributed to prior work experience. In 1910, Louis Morisot recommended larger Berrichons as artillery horses.

Crossbreeding experiments with Arabian stallions and Berrichon mares aimed to produce more elegant post horses. Lighter models served chasseur à cheval regiments. Sancerre horses were used in line cavalry, gendarmerie, and reserve cavalry. Berrichons likely ended their careers in freight transport. When too old to work, they were sold to butcheries.

== Distribution ==
Berrichon breeders divided production: some bred horses, others raised them. In the early 20th century, Berry bred various horses, including draft horses, Anglo-Arabians, and Limousin horses. Many "Berrichon" horses originated from Vendée or Charentes. According to Jacques Mulliez, the Champagne Berrichonne had a high horse density, mainly males raised in the Poitevin Marsh. This is corroborated by an 1839 source. Bresse sold young horses to Berrichon merchants, who resold them in Paris.

In 1840, the Issoudun arrondissement was the main trading hub. Horses were sold at major horse fairs, notably Sancerre and Saint-Thibault. By 1857, the horse industry expanded across Berry, improving with soil and agricultural advancements. Wet valley regions and arrondissements like Saint-Amand-Montrond, Le Blanc, La Châtre, and parts of Sancerre maintained broodmares, while areas around Bourges, Issoudun, and Châteauroux—suited for cattle and small sheep—purchased and raised foals for agricultural work, supplying southern and southeastern departments. These horses, called "Berrichons" commercially, were mostly Poitevins.

In 1941, the Berrichon stud book had 370 members owning 3,515 mares and 483 stallions. The breed was sold in Beauce, Yonne, Allier, southern Loiret, and Roussillon, but not exported internationally. Most owners had one to three mares; farms with over six broodmares were rare. State-owned stallions, mainly at the Blois National Stud, covered an average of 80 mares per season. Before 1940, the Saint-Amand-Montrond fair sold 1,000 to 1,200 foals per event. Other significant fairs were in Baugy, Vatan, and Rosnay.

The Berrichon is listed as extinct ("X") by the FAO, and as an extinct European local breed in a 2010 Uppsala University study. CAB International's dictionary lists it as a Percheron variety, officially existing from 1923 to 1966.

== In culture ==
The Berrichon horse appears in Roger de Beauvoir's works, notably Mademoiselle de Choisy and L'Abbé de Choisy. George Sand, familiar with the "Brenne horse," references it in her works. In Le Péché de Monsieur Antoine, a dialogue reads:

You have a fine little beast there, [the marquis] said to Émile, examining Corbeau with a connoisseur's eye. It's a Brennou, good breed, solid, and sober.

In Le Cercle hippique de Mézière-en-Brenne, she praises the local breed:

I'm a Berrinchon, and so is my horse; one carrying the other, we'll go fast and far.

== See also ==
- Percheron
- List of horse breeds

== Bibliography ==
- Bernard, Daniel (2006). Berry: Mémoires d'un terroir [Berry: Memoirs of a Region]. Éditions de Borée. ISBN 9782844944634.
- Bouchet, Ghislaine (1993). Le cheval à Paris de 1850 à 1914: Mémoires et documents de l'École des Chartes [The Horse in Paris from 1850 to 1914: Memoirs and documents of the École des Chartes] (in French). Geneva/Paris: Librairie Droz.
- Commandant de Rancourt (January–February 1939). "Le cheval berrichon et la défense nationale" [The Berrichon Horse and National Defense]. RC.
- Cordeau, Pierre (1946). Le Cheval de trait berrichon (thèse) [The Berrichon Draft Horse (Thesis)]. impr. de Paquet.
- Cormier, Charles Louis Maurice (1905). Le cheval berrichon et le cheval limousin: avec de nombreuses simili-gravures hors texte [The Berrichon Horse and the Limousin Horse: With Numerous Simili-Engravings]. Châteauroux: A.-F. Patissier, libraire-éditeur.
- de Montendre, Achille (1840). Des institutions hippiques et de l'élève du cheval dans les principaux États de l'Europe: ouvrage composé d'après des documents officiels, des écrits publiés en Allemagne, en Angleterre et en France et des observations faites sur les lieux à différentes époques [On Equestrian Institutions and Horse Breeding in the Main European States: Work Compiled from Official Documents, Writings Published in Germany, England, and France, and Observations Made on Site at Various Times]. Vol. 2. Bureau du Journal des haras.
- Jacoulet, J.; Chomel, Claude (1895). Traité d'Hippologie [Treatise on Hippology]. Vol. 2. Paris: S. Milon fils.
- Magne, Jean Henri (1857). Hygiène vétérinaire appliquée [Applied Veterinary Hygiene]. Vol. 1. Labe.
