= Cheval du Morvan =

Breed of horse

- Conservation status: extinct
- Other names: Morvandain; Morvandelle; Morvandiau
- Country of origin: Morvan massif, Burgundy, France

The Cheval du Morvan, (Note: translatable as "horse of the Morvan".) also known as the Morvandiau, Morvandain or Morvandelle, is an extinct French horse breed from the Morvan massif in Burgundy, for which it is named. Horses were bred in the Morvan from before the French Revolution, both as saddle-horses for fox-hunting and as cavalry mounts, and for draught use. They were of small to medium height and known for their strength and tenacity. The Cheval du Morvan became extinct with the advent of industrialisation and improved transportation in the nineteenth century. As a draught horse it was replaced by the Nivernais and Comtois breeds, and as a saddle-horse by the Thoroughbred.

== History ==
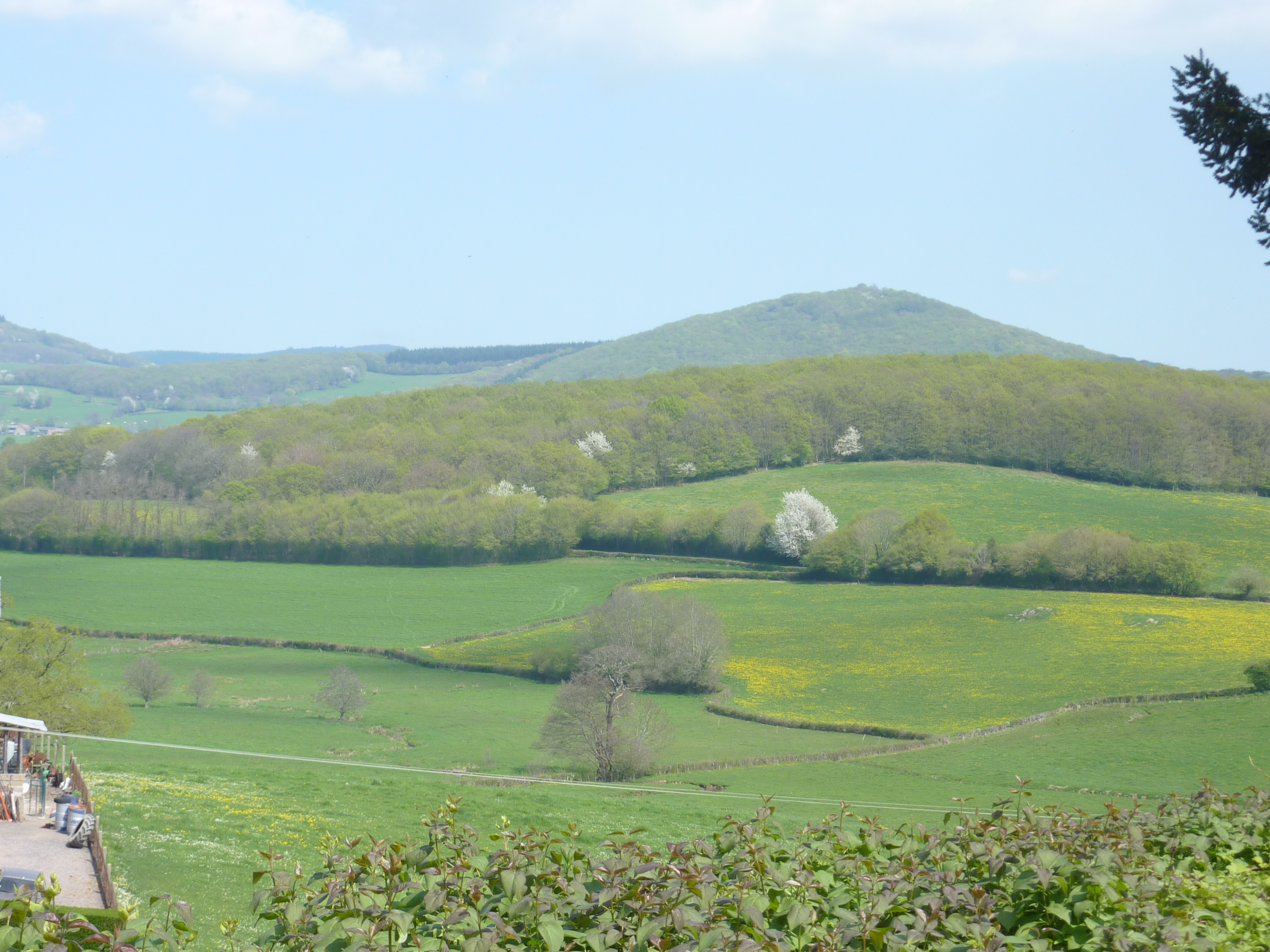
The Morvan seen from Château-Chinon, the birthplace of the Morvan horse; until the 19th century, the horses lived in the surrounding forests

Before the French Revolution, large numbers of saddle-horses were raised in the Morvan, both for hunting and as cavalry mounts; the muddy roads in the area and in the surrounding provinces were only passable by horse. The Morvan breed was particularly suitable as light cavalry horse. It was raised mainly in the area round Château-Chinon, where Étienne François, duc de Choiseul, then minister for war, established a Morvan stud on his lands at Chassy.

The Cheval du Morvan was raised mainly in its region of origin, but also in the Nivernais and Charolais. Good Morvan horses were bred at Clamecy, and Morvan foals were sold at the fairs of Châtillon-en-Bazois, Billy-Chevannes, Montigny-sur-Canne, Saint-Révérien, Decize and Nevers in the Nièvre.

The horses were managed extensively, living in semi-feral groups in the woods of the Morvan. In summer they mixed freely with the cattle; in winter they received no supplementary feed, but survived as best they could. Unlike other horses in the region, Morvan horses were not crossbred with royal stallions housed in the Haras Nationaux stables.

Many war horses during the French Revolution and the Napoleonic Wars were Morvan horses, provoking a crisis in Morvan horse breeding farms and decimating the species. In 1791, the war minister ordered that mares be requisitioned for war. Morvan horses had a good reputation as war horses, according to Pierquin de Gembloux.

=== Extinction ===
The Morvan horse fell victim to industrialisation and wartime horse requisitions, making it one of the local breeds that became extinct during the 19th century.

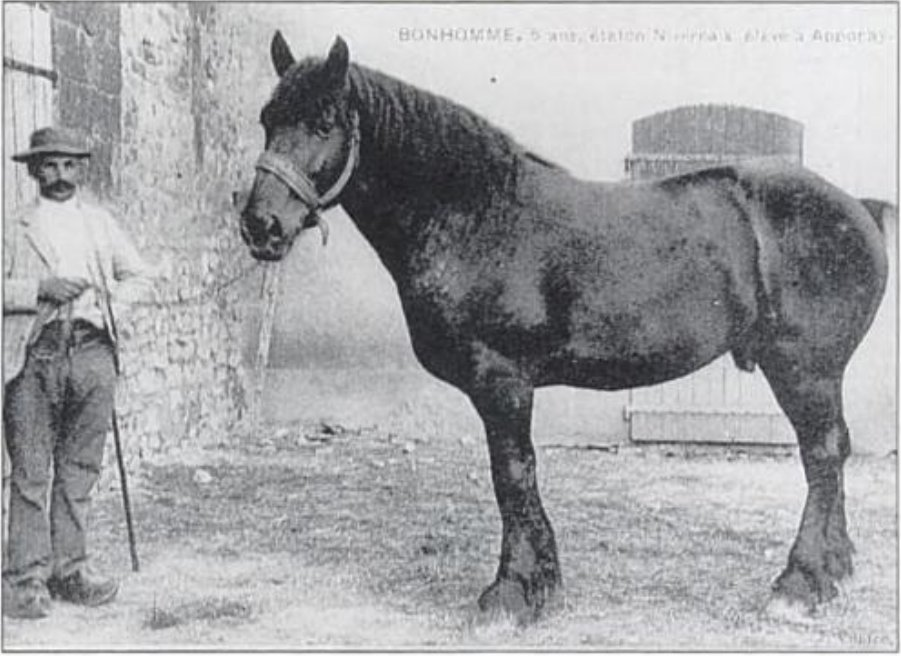
The Nivernais horse was bred by crossing Percheron stallions with Morvan mares.

The Cheval du Morvan is well documented in nineteenth-century sources.

The rise of the draught horse in the first half of the 19th century is thought to have contributed to the extinction of the Morvan horse. René Musset argued that the saddle horse was largely replaced by the draught horse, but Bernadette Lizet suggested that Morvan horse breeding died off due to disinterest. Eugène Gayot cited the Morvan horse's use in wartime, the agricultural revolution, the construction of new roads, the opening of the Canal du Nivernais and the increased use of pastures for raising livestock as factors in the Morvan horse's extinction. Marcel Mavré suggested that the various wars of the 19th century were to blame, while Bernadette Lizet cited other modernist factors, including the construction of railways.

By 1840, count Achille de Montendre noted that Morvan horses lived in only a few locations. By 1861, according to Eugène Gayot, Morvan horses had died out completely.

== Description ==
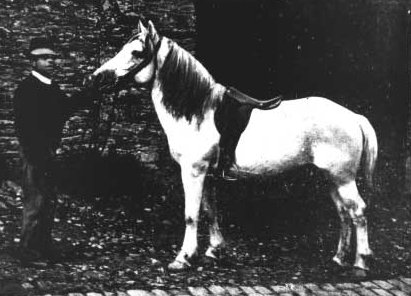
A Breton saddle-horse cob, morphologically close to a Morvan horse.

According to Bernadette Lizet, most descriptions of Morvan horses were written after they had become extinct and were likely exaggerated.

Morvan horses likely had a roan or iron grey coat. They were known for their rustic character, courage and energy, making them well-suited to hard labour and long journeys. They were said to be the most solid and vigorous breed at passing through mires and bogs. Their gait was rapid and sure-footed; Paul Diffloth suggested that they were capable of trotting at 12 km/h on poorly constructed roads.

Morvan horses were typically unsuited to work before the age of seven, but compensated with a long working life. Sources do not agree as to their character; some refer to their docility, while others speak of their disagreeable nature.

=== Morphology ===
Morvan horses were stocky like a Breton cob, but with more elegance. They likely appeared similar to a modern pony. Eugène Gayot noted that they were of medium height but fleshed out. André Sanson described them as small horses with knees of steel and a wild look. Other sources referred to Morvan horses as small, light and hardy animals with disagreeable bodies. Close to the ground, they had a generic head, strong and squarish in the front and with a flat chamfer, a small hairy mouth, short ears, gaunt flanks and a flattened rump. Lorry, a revolutionary veterinary physician from the military cavalry at the end of the 18th century, spoke of them as strong and agile horses with powerful eyesight, a good set of teeth, solid feet and a large chest, similar to that of a military horse.

== See also ==
- List of French horse breeds
