= Landau reflex =

Reflex seen in infants

Landau reflex or Landau reaction refers to a reflex seen in infants when held horizontally in the air in the prone position. It emerges 3 months after birth and lasts until up to 12 months to 24 months of age. A normal response of infants when held in a horizontal prone position is to maintain a convex arc with the head raised and the legs slightly flexed. It is poor in those with floppy infant syndrome and exaggerated in hypertonic and opisthotonic infants.

== Interpretation ==
An abnormal Landau reflex may indicate hypotonia or hypertonia and may indicate a motor development issue.
