= Anglo-Arabian =

Breed of horse

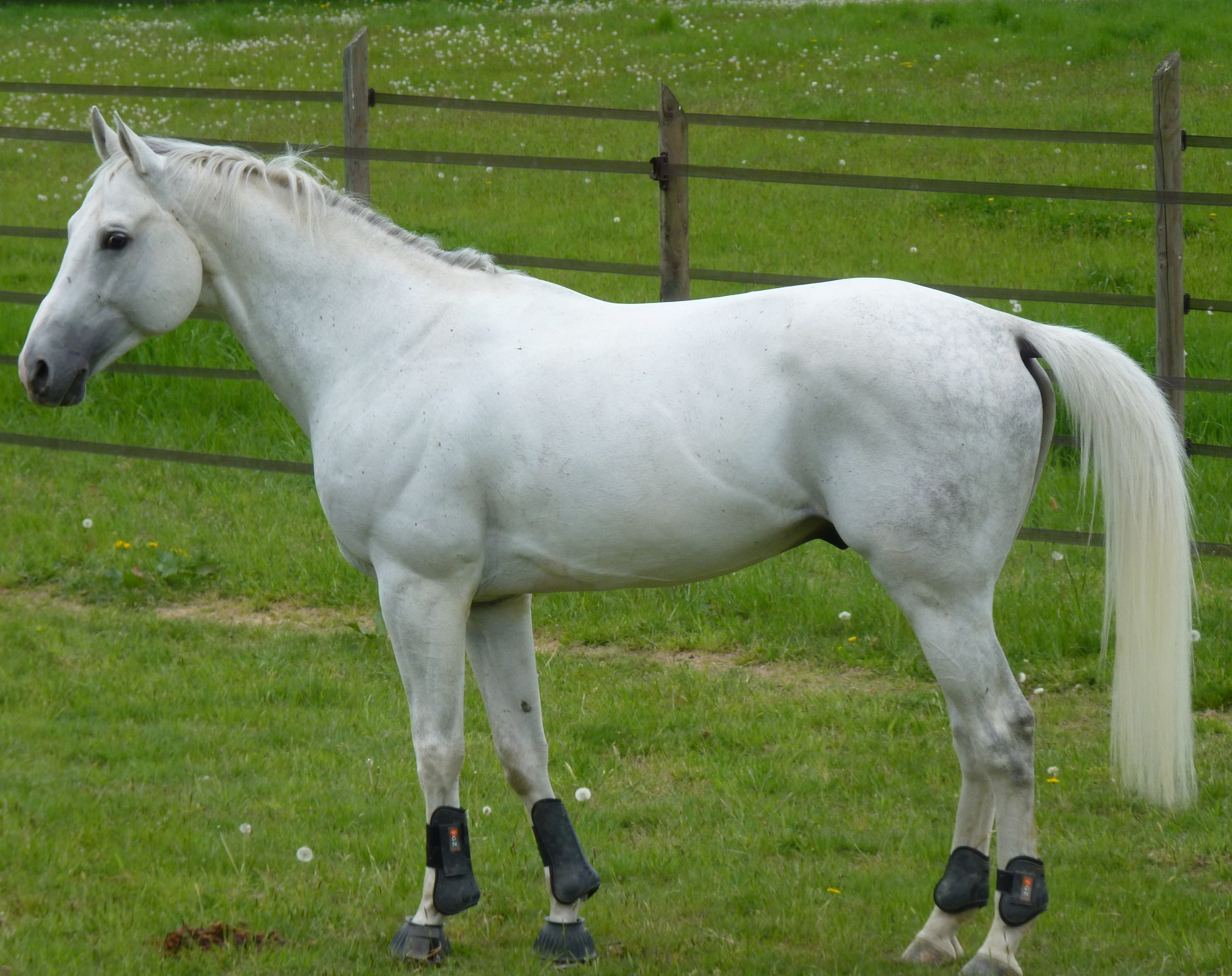
- A gray Anglo-Arabian

- Anglo-Arabian breed brand
- Other names: Anglo-Arab
- Country of origin: Worldwide, most popular in the United Kingdom, France, and the United States

Traits
- Distinguishing features: Well-formed, powerful, good gaits, sport horse characteristics. Combines traits of both Arabian and Thoroughbred breeds

The Anglo-Arabian, also known as the Anglo-Arab, is a horse breed that originated in France by cross-breeding a Thoroughbred with an Arabian. The Anglo-Arabian has origins tracing back to the Limousin Horse. It was officially recognized by Emperor Louis Philippe I and produced by the Haras National du Pin. The Anglo-Arabian has long legs, a refined head, larger hindquarters, and are most commonly seen in gray, bay, or chestnut. To be recognized as an Anglo-Arabian with the Arabian Horse Association, the horse must have at least 25% Arabian blood. There are no color or height restrictions to be registered. Due to its lineage and physique, the Anglo-Arabian is utilized for sports-related activities such as dressage, show jumping, endurance, and cross-country.

Genetic diseases are possible as the foal is likely to inherit a combination of both parent genes. Genetic testing will help limit fetal DNA exposure and ensure knowledgeable breeding. The most common genetic diseases associated with the Anglo-Arabian lineage include Severe Combined Immunodeficiency, Cerebellar Abiotrophy, Lavender Foal Syndrome, and Occipitoatlantoaxial Malformation.

== Origin ==
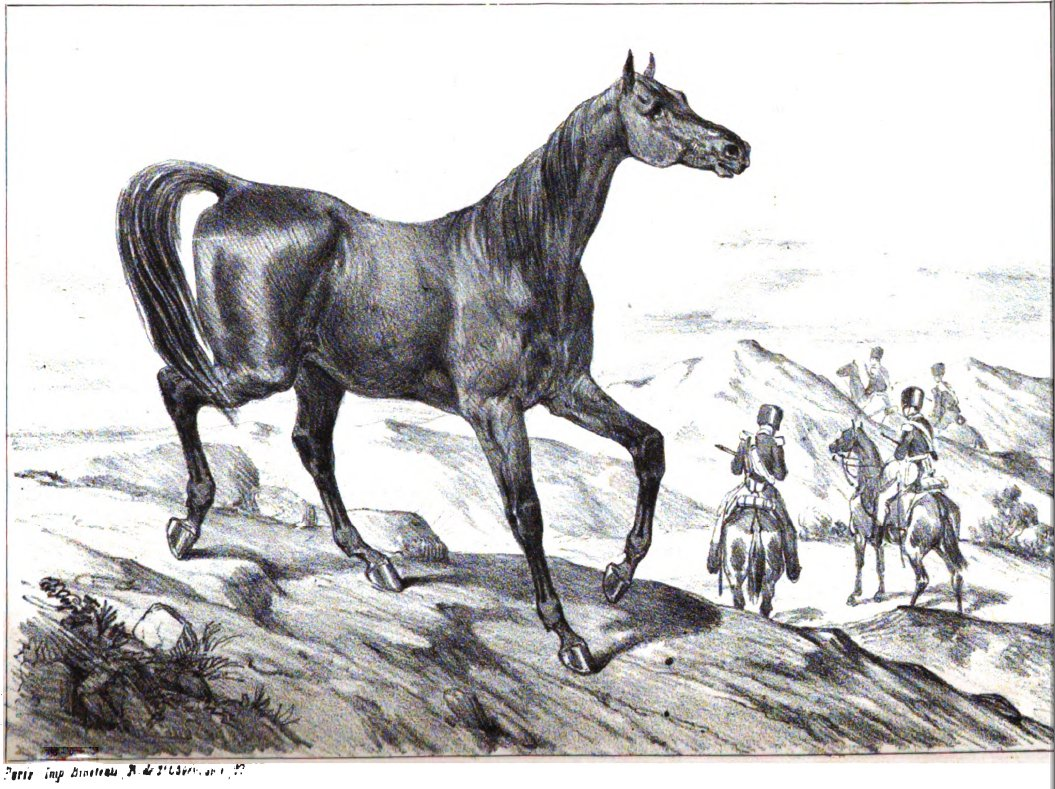
The Limousin horse

The Limousin horse was a breed that originated from the region of Limousin in France during the Medieval times. They were created by breeding French native mares with imported English Thoroughbreds and a sprinkle of Arabian blood. Although this breed is now extinct, the Limousins were the predecessor of the Anglo-Arabians and significantly influenced the creation of this breed.

In the 1750s, breeders from Normandy, France, bred Syrian imported Arabians with native thoroughbred mares. There is limited documentation on their breeding of the Anglo-Arabians, but the breeders are credited with the first traceable origins as the offspring of these mares were later used to produce the officiated Anglo-Arabians.

In 1833, Emperor Louis Philippe I passed an ordinance that led to the creation of the French Studbook. The primary aim of the Studbook was to help establish the breeds of horses suitable for race horsing. The Studbook officially recognized English, Arab, and Anglo-Arab horses as suitable breeds. It also served as a valuable resource for those interested in locating the horse's pedigree.

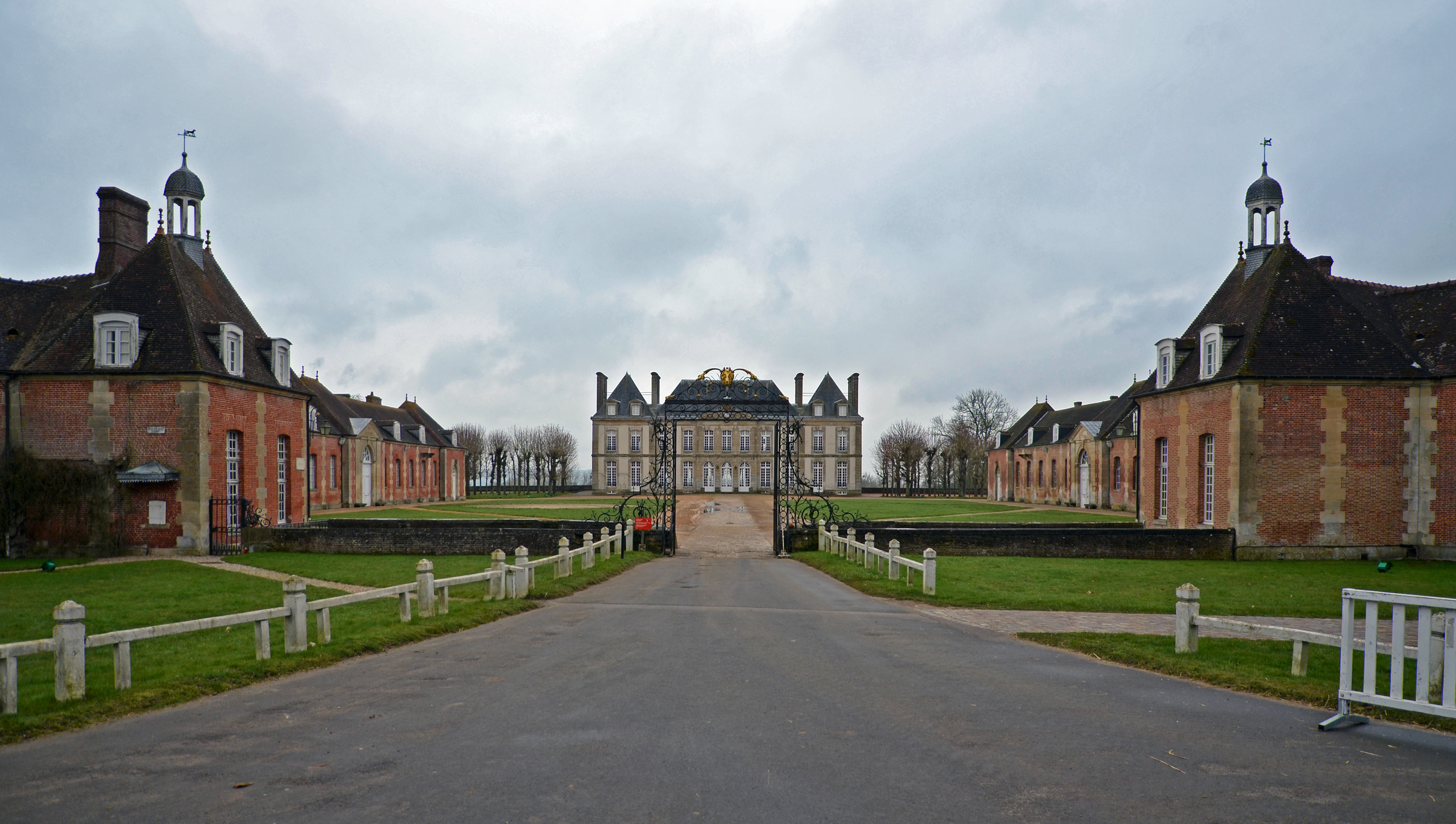
The Haras National du Pin

In 1836, the French National Stud Service, Haras National du Pin, began officially breeding Anglo-Arabians. Their service was responsible for maintaining the breedings for private cooperators, and they were highly selective in picking and breeding the most exceptional candidates. They crossed the imported English Thoroughbred mares with Arabians that remained in the country after the French defeated the Muslims in the Battle of Tours. The service also attempted to crossbreed in the opposite direction, where Arabian mares bred with English sires, but found that the foal was less desirable as the size of the mother's uterus affects the adult size of the foal.

In 1880, the Anglo-Arabian breed criteria formally established that a horse only needed 25% Arabian blood to be considered an Anglo-Arabian. As long as they have the minimum ratio, they can be registered with the Anglo-Arabian Horse Registry of the Arabian Horse Association (AHA) and are eligible to participate in AHA shows. Horses registered with the Arabian Horse Association will be given the breed brand.

== Characteristics ==
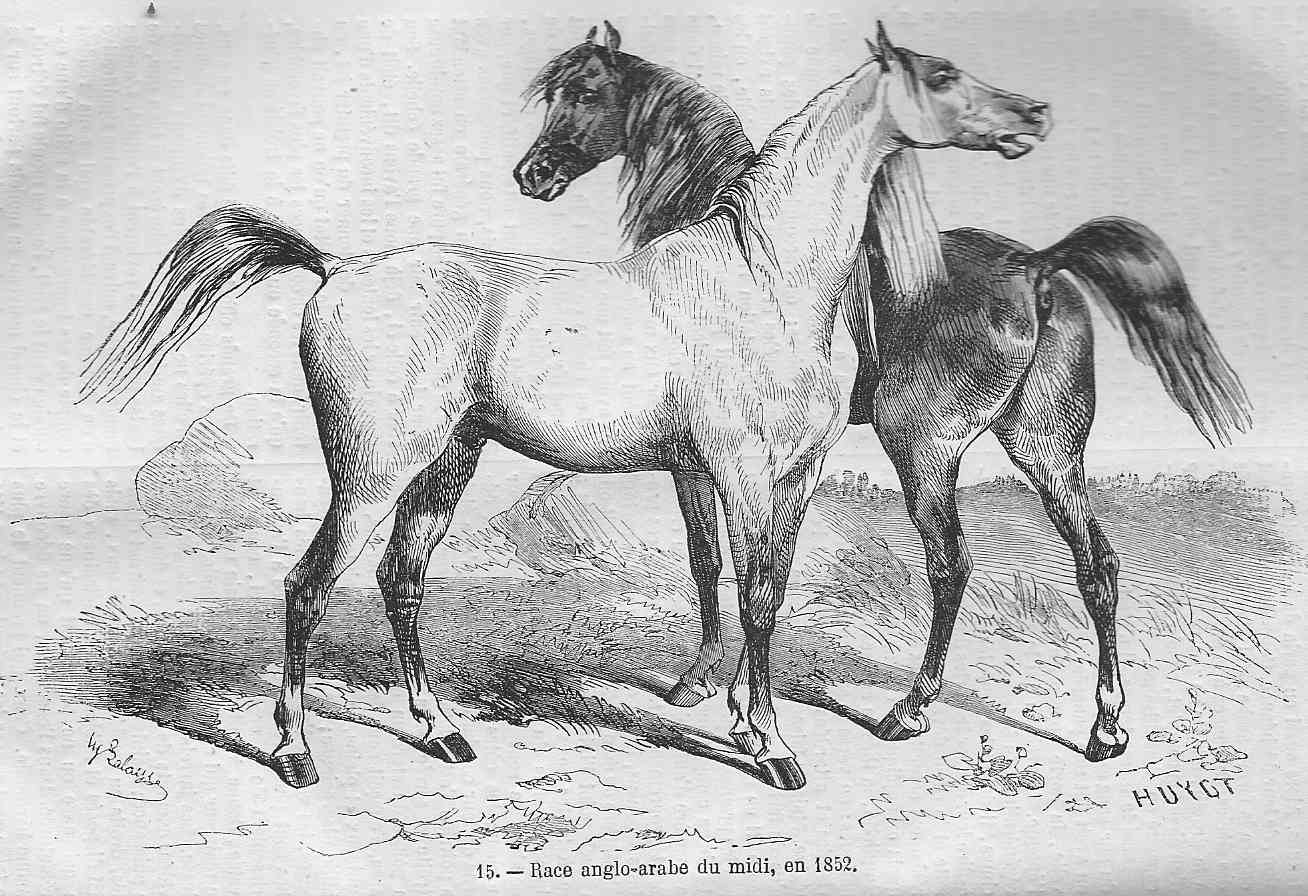
Anglo-Arabian Physique

The size and appearance of the Anglo-Arabian breed mix varies depending on their ancestry, just like other breed mixes. On average, they stand between 15.2 and 16.3 hands (62-67 inches, 158–65 cm) tall, which is taller than the average Arabian but just below the height of a thoroughbred. Their body is sturdily built, similar to the thoroughbred, with refined heads that showcase their Arabian lineage. They have a deep chest, round hindquarters, prominent withers, and lengthy legs. The most common colors for the Anglo-Arabian are chestnut, bay, or gray. The Arabian Horse Association accepts any color and height for the breed, but the association requires photos of their coloring to be submitted for registration.

== Genetic diseases ==
Breeding Arabians and thoroughbreds comes with a risk of breed-specific diseases that can be inherited. When breeding Anglo-Arabians, it is vital to prioritize the breed's well-being and genetic health by noting potential health problems. Genetic testing can help identify carriers of these diseases, prevent them from entering the breeding stream, and assist breeders in making informed decisions before breeding. By being mindful of these health concerns, breeders can ensure the breed's continued success. The following diseases are autosomal recessive traits that will lead to the death or euthanasia of the affected foal.

Severe Combined Immunodeficiency
Severe combined immunodeficiency (SCID) is a fatal genetic disorder by a mutation which causes the complete absence of immune cells. The foals will have immunodeficiency, where they will be cease within 4-6 months.

Cerebellar Abiotrophy

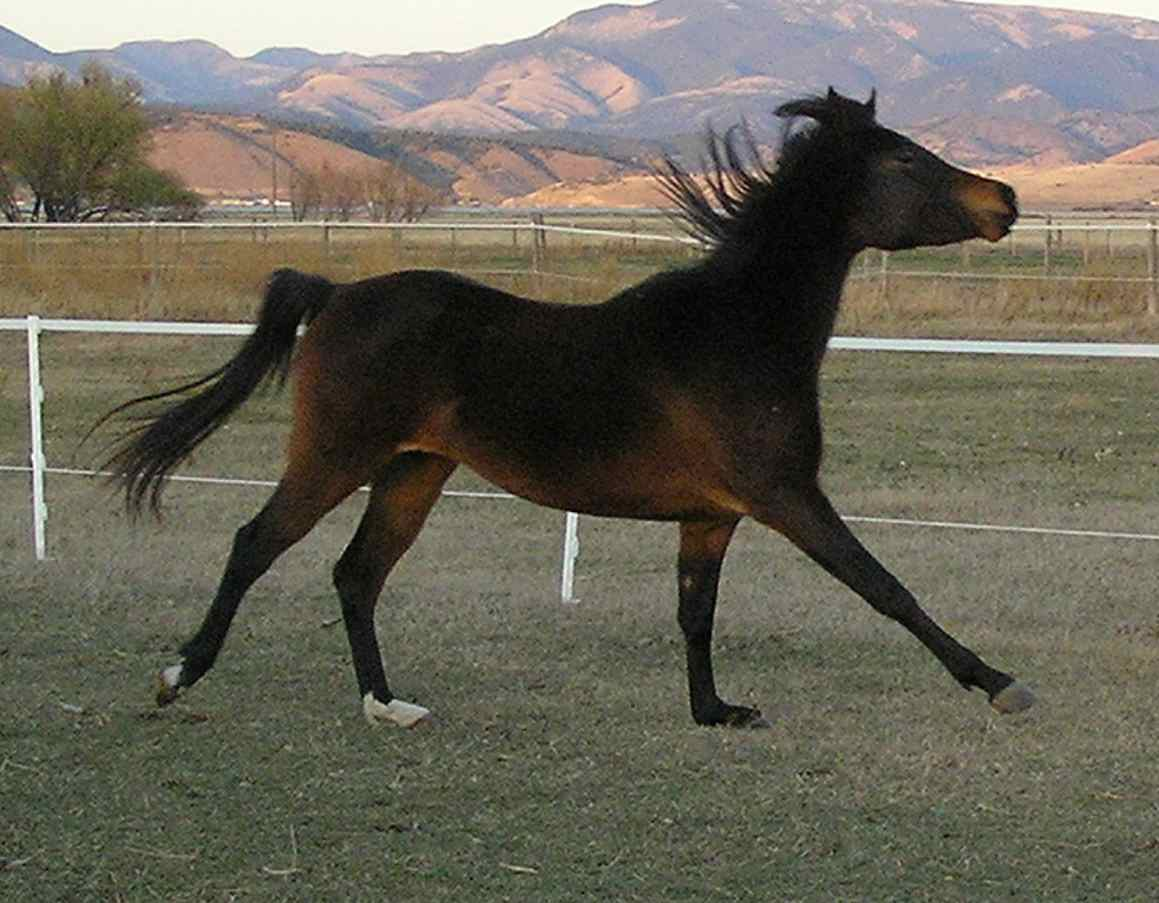
Filly with cerebellar abiotrophy exhibiting a stiff, awkward gait

Arabian horses and other horses of Arabian ancestry can inherit a neurological condition called cerebellar abiotrophy (CA), which causes the progressive death of neurons. Affected foals will have head tremors, lack of balance equilibrium (ataxia), and other neurological problems.

Lavender Foal Syndrome

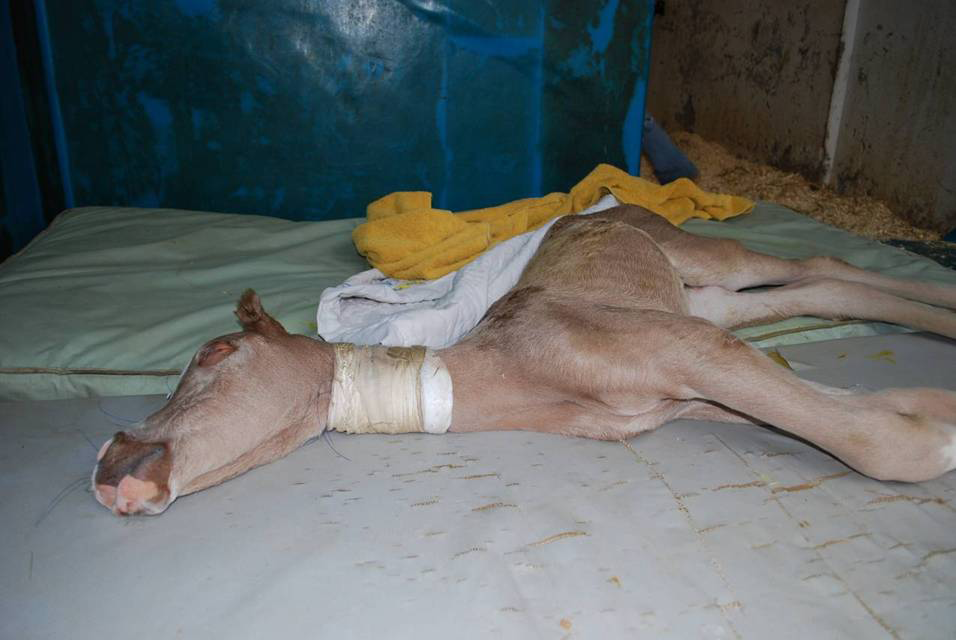
Foal with Lavender Foal Syndrome

Lavender Foal Syndrome (LFS), also known as Coat Color Dilution Lethal (CCDL), is a rare genetic condition that affects foals. This syndrome causes the foals to have a unique pink-gray coat and neurological dysfunctions that hinder their ability to stand and nurse properly. The syndrome is caused by a mutation in the myosin Va gene (MYO5A). Clinical signs of LFS include seizures, nystagmus, and severe hyperextension of limbs and back (opisthotonos).

Occipitoatlantoaxial Malformation
Occipitoatlantoaxial malformation (OAAM) is a neurological disorder that affects the first two vertebrae of the neck and the base of the skull. This disorder is caused by a deletion in the homeobox D3 gene (HOXD3), resulting in spinal compression, damage to the spinal cord, reduced body coordination, and limited movement of the foal.

== Use ==
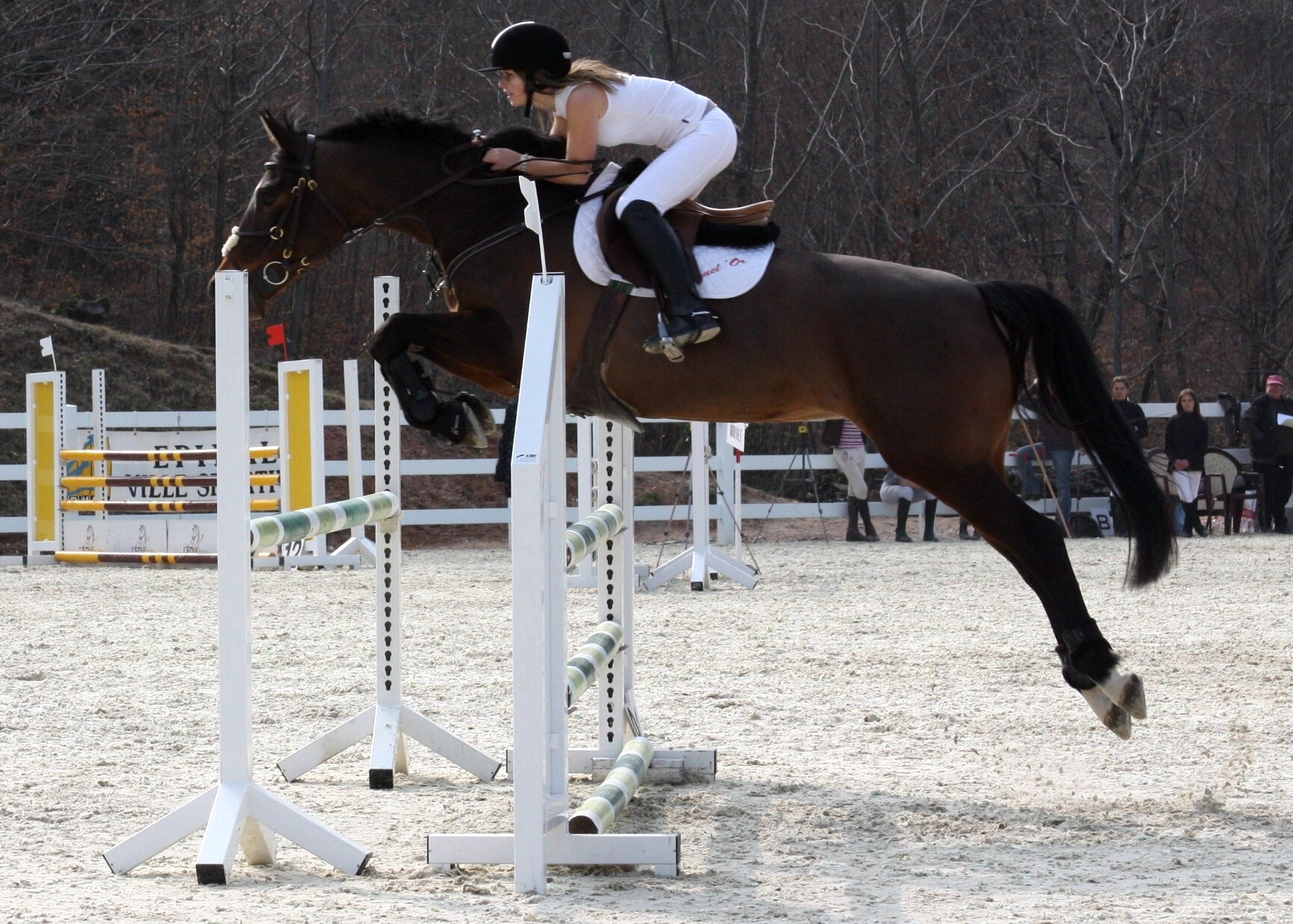
Anglo-Arabian performing in show jumping

The Arabian breed was initially developed to be war horses, known for their great stamina, endurance, and intelligence, which aided their riders on the battlefield. On the other hand, thoroughbreds were primarily bred for racing and show jumping due to their athleticism. Combining these two breeds resulted in the Anglo-Arabian, which is an ideal breed for sports-related activities such as show jumping, cross-country, endurance, or dressage. The best examples of this breed inherit the Arabian's refinement, structure, and endurance as well as the speed and scope of the Thoroughbred.

== See also ==
- Zweibrücker
- Arabian horse
- Thoroughbred
- French Anglo-Arab
- Sardinian Anglo-Arab
- Gidran
- List of horse breeds
