= Lavender foal syndrome =

Genetic disease in horses

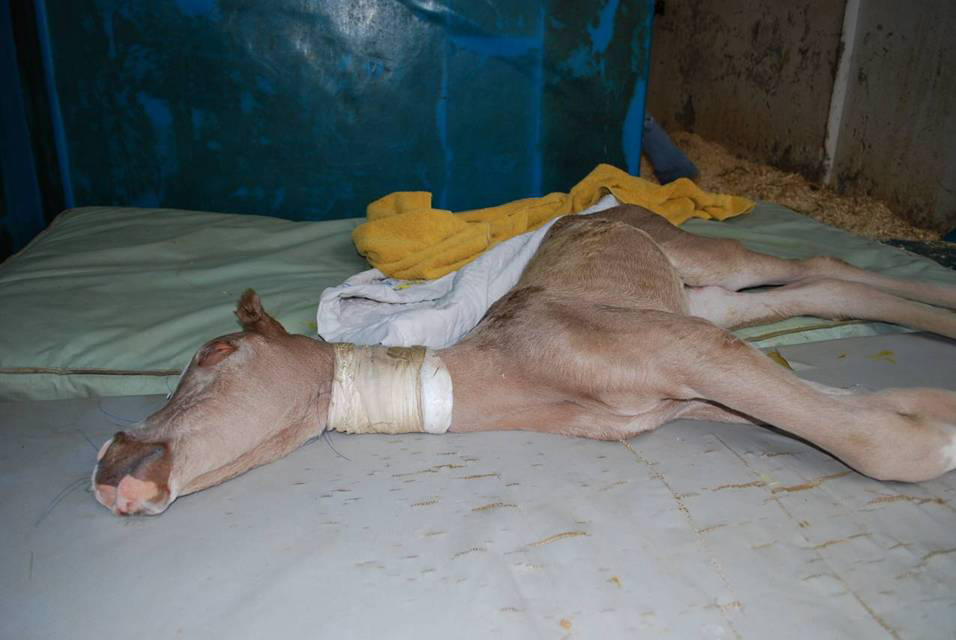
A foal with lavender foal syndrome exhibiting opisthotonus, a common clinical sign of the disorder

Lavender foal syndrome (LFS), also called coat color dilution lethal (CCDL), is an autosomal recessive genetic disease that affects newborn foals of certain Arabian horse bloodlines. Affected LFS foals have severe neurological abnormalities, cannot stand, and require euthanasia shortly after birth. The popular name originates due to a diluted color of the foal's coat, that in some cases appears to have a purple or lavender hue. However, not all foals possess the lavender coat colour, and colouring can range from silver to light chestnut to a pale pink. Carrier horses have no clinical signs, but DNA testing can determine if a horse carries the gene.

== Impacted bloodlines ==
Arabians of "Egyptian" bloodlines have the most documented cases of the disorder, with 10.3% of Egyptian Arabians being carriers, but only 1.8% of non-Egyptian Arabians. Cases reported in peer-reviewed veterinary literature are mostly of foals descended from a number of "Egyptian Arabian" or Egyptian-related bloodline groups, in Australia, a few breeders of Crabbet-related lines have also had foals affected by LFS. Lavender foal syndrome should be considered in any weak newborn Arabian or part-Arabian foal, particularly if it has some degree of "Egyptian" breeding, if the foal cannot stand, if other signs of neurological problems are present, and especially if it has an abnormally light coat color.

== History and research ==
The condition has been recognized since the mid- to late-1950s.

Research into the genetics of LFS has been conducted at the University of California, Davis and Cornell University in the United States, the University of Queensland in Australia, and the University of Pretoria in South Africa. In November, 2009, Cornell University announced a DNA test has been developed to detect carriers of LFS. Simultaneously, the University of Pretoria also announced they had developed a DNA test. Testing is now available at Cornell, Pretoria, and Queensland, Australia.

== Clinical signs ==
The condition gets its name because most, though not all, affected foals are born with a unique coat color dilution that lightens the tips of the coat hairs, or even the entire hair shaft. The color has variously been described as a silver sheen, a dull lavender, a pale, dull pinkish-gray, or pale chestnut. This dilution differs from gray foals because grays are born a dark color and lighten with age. It is also different from roan, because the hair is of a uniform shade, not of intermingled light and dark hairs.

Foals with LFS are unable to stand, and sometimes cannot even attain sternal recumbency (to roll from their side to lie upright, resting on the sternum, a precursor position to standing). They may lie with their necks arched back (opisthotonus) and legs stiff (extensor rigidity); generalised tonic-clonic seizures or seizure activity such as 'paddling' leg movements are also common. Apparent blindness may also be a clinical sign of the disorder, but is not seen in every case. Although they do have a sucking reflex, they cannot stand to nurse, and affected foals are usually euthanized within a few days of birth. There is no cure. In some cases, the mare may also have difficulty foaling, though foaling difficulties are not the cause of the condition. In some cases, LFS-affected foals may be larger than usual.

LFS is different from neonatal maladjustment syndrome, but may be confused with it if the distinctive coat color is overlooked.

== Inheritance ==
Lavender foal syndrome is thought to be created by an autosomal recessive gene at MYO5A. When a horse is heterozygous for the gene, it is a carrier, but healthy and has no clinical signs of the condition. If two carriers are bred together, however, classic Mendelian genetics indicate a 25% chance of any given mating producing a homozygous foal, hence affected by the disease. Carrier horses can be bred and produce non-affected foals, as long as they are bred with a non-carrier for the LFS gene. It is hypothesized, though untested, that LFS may be linked to another genetic disease that affects Egyptian-related Arabians, juvenile epilepsy. This theory has been raised because of a small number of horses that have produced both LFS and epileptic foals.

LFS is one of six genetic diseases known to affect horses of Arabian bloodlines.

== Additional information ==
- Goodwin-Camplglio, Lisa. "Genetic Disorders in Arabian Horses" Current Research Projects. World Arabian Horse Organization, September 2008.
- Page, P; Parker, R; Harper, C; Guthrie, A; Neser, J (2006). "Clinical, clinicopathologic, postmortem examination findings and familial history of 3 Arabians with lavender foal syndrome". J. Vet. Intern. Med. 20 (6): 1491–4. doi:10.1111/j.1939-1676.2006.tb00772.x. PMID 17186871.
