= Neonatal maladjustment syndrome =

Horse disease

Neonatal maladjustment syndrome (NMS) is a syndrome where newborn foals exhibit uncommon behaviors, occurring in three to five percent of live births. These behaviors can include aimless wandering, hypersensitivity to loud sounds and brightness, weakness or coordination issues, and the inability to nurse. Neonatal maladjustment syndrome is often referred to as dummy foal syndrome by the equine community due to the aimlessness of the foals, nicknaming them "wanderers" or "dummy foals".

== Symptoms ==
Often symptoms of NMS do not always exhibit themselves immediately after birth, as foals will at first appear normal. Often it takes a number of hours for the foal's odd behavior to become noticeable. These behaviors can include:

- Inability to find udder or nurse
- Incordination and staggering
- Aimless wandering and not recognizing the mare
- Limited flight reaction
- Lack of a suckle reflex
- Difficulty lying down
- Hypersensitivity to touch
- Decreased reaction to touch
- Licking, chewing or biting stall walls or feeders

In severe cases, a foal can start to experience seizures. These seizures range from short, mild lapses to longer, full-body seizures.

== Possible causes ==
=== Oxygenation ===
While it is unknown exactly what causes NMS, many vets and horse owners believe it is due to a lack of oxygen available to the foal during the very important perinatal period, which means shortly before, during or after the birth (also known as foaling). This could stem from under oxygenated blood flow, decreased blood flow or damaged blood cells. The lack of oxygen could also come from early placenta detachment, where the placenta detaches from the uterus for a longer period of time than normal births. Many things could cause this detachment, although twin births, uterine or urinary infections, low blood pressure and other diseases increase the risk.

=== Neurosteroids ===
Another possible cause, as theorised and researched by the University of California, Davis School of Veterinary Medicine, could be neurosteroids that are essential and active while the foal is in utero. Foals receive stimulation of certain neurosteroids that keep them "quiet" during gestation. This is important for the health and safety of both mare and foal. If a foal were to move around similarly to humans during gestation, injuries and possible miscarriage could occur. These neurosteroids ensure that the foal remains relatively still in the womb. However, after the birth it is important that these neurosteroids stop. Horses are prey animals, with a strong flight response. If these neurosteroids continue to suppress the movement and reactions of a foal, it would be at a greater risk in the wild. Foals should be up and ready to run around shortly after birth, typically within a few hours. It is thought that the "switch" that changes these neurosteroids occurs during birth. While the foal is moving through the birth canal, the pressure exerted on the foal's body acts as that switch. Most live births take between 20 and 40 minutes. It is during this time that the sedative neurosteroids stop production, signalling the foal to "wake up". This theory is supported by the discovery of sedative neurosteroids in the bloodstream of foals, shortly after birth, that develop NMS. The neurosteroids are capable of crossing the blood brain barrier. This allows them to affect the central nervous system of the foal.

== Treatments ==
Early diagnosis and intervention is extremely important. Foals which do not nurse and obtain antibodies via colostrum from the mare are susceptible to infection. With treatment 80% of foals recover and are behaviorally normal.

=== Intravenous treatment ===
Treatment of the condition is supportive care. This may include stomach tubing the foal, intravenous fluids, antimicrobials for infection prevention, and assisting the foal to rise and nursing care.

=== Madigan foal squeeze procedure ===
A novel treatment is recreating the birth canal pressures which are believed to signal the transition of in the womb brain function to post birth standing and bonding with the mare and nursing. This treatment uses series of ropes and knots wrapped around the foal's chest, then pressure is applied for a set amount of time. This method was used in a research project at UC Davis to study the flopping reaction of foals. One of the researchers noted changes in neurosteroids during the rope squeeze and he wondered if that might be similar to birth canal pressures to signal transition to life outside the womb. The name Madigan foal squeeze procedure comes from this research led by a veterinary professor and expert on neonatal equine health named John Madigan. These ropes are applied around the midsection of the foal, and pressure is applied by pulling the ropes with a medium amount of pressure for about 20 minutes. This mimics the pressure felt during active birth. This is thought to help the brain neurosteroids signal the "off switch" for keeping the foal asleep in the womb for the 11 months of gestation.

The Madigan squeeze procedure is now also used in calves, lambs, and crias.

=== Overall goals ===
The main goals with any treatment for foals with NMS is to ensure proper nourishment in the early hours of life. Foals should begin nursing from the mare within the first couple of hours after birth. If they are not, a veterinary physician should be contacted immediately. Attempts at bottle feeding should be performed carefully to prevent aspiration pneumonia. Various treatments for the presumed cause being hypoxia have not improved outcomes versus supportive care. Foals with seizures need veterinary critical care treatment. In any case, an equine veterinarian should be called and consulted before any treatment is applied. With early intervention and appropriate treatment, studies show that up to 80 percent of foals diagnosed with NMS after birth can make a full recovery and mature into a fully functioning adult.

== Connection to humans ==
The UC Davis School of Veterinary Medicine is conducting NMS research. They investigate not only possible causes and effective treatments, but also how this syndrome could provide answers to other issues. One standout connection to NMS comes from childhood autism spectrum disorder. The researchers noticed that many symptoms of NMS looked similar to the symptoms of childhood autism and illness. The tactile response from the foals seems to mimic some anecdotal stories of touch helping newborn babies with illnesses. This practice is becoming more and more widespread in the United States, often referred to as kangaroo care, a process where a newborn baby is immediately given to the mother or father for skin-to-skin contact.

There is also precedent for further research into neurosteroids in humans. Past research has shown that there are similar neurosteroids concentrations in humans as seen in the foals that present with neonatal maladjustment syndrome.

This approach to possible links between human medical science and veterinary science is known as One Health.

== Bibliography ==
- Davis, U.C. "UC Davis Global Health." One Health Institute
- Aleman, M, et al. Survey of a Novel Physical Compression Squeeze Procedure for Management of Equine Neonatal Maladjustment Syndrome in Foals. Animals 2017, Sept; 7(9): 69
- Rossdale, PD. Clinical View of Equine Foetal Maturation. Equine Vet J. 25:14; 3–7 April 1993
- Fletcher, Caitlin. "The Complete Guide to Foal Care For Dummies." Hagyard, 2015
- Bailey, Pat. "Newborn Horses Give Clues to Autism." UC Davis, UC Davis Veterinary School of Medicine, 3 Feb. 2015
