= Limousin horse =

Breed of horse

Limousin
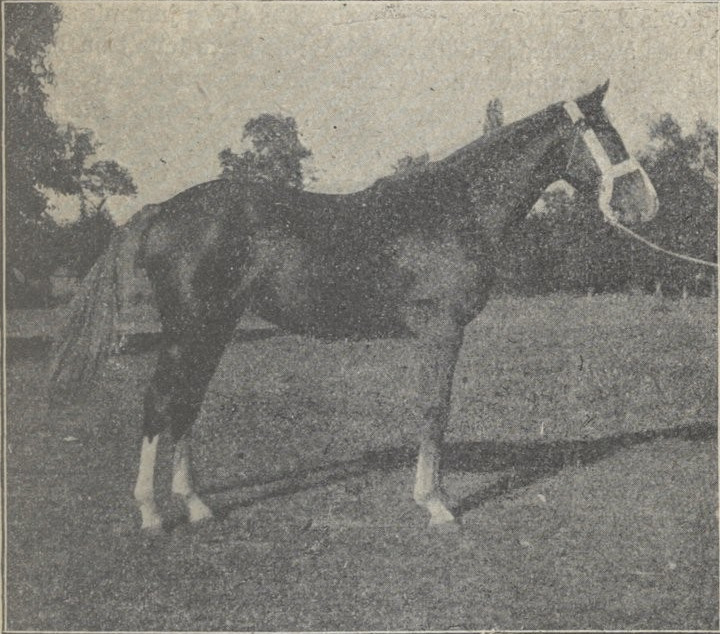
- Limousin filly (1923)
- Conservation status: Extinct
- Country of origin: France

The Limousin horse (French: cheval limousin, Occitan: caval lemosin) is an extinct French and Occitan horse breed that was bred from the 12th century to the 20th century as a saddle horse, in the Limousin region of France, formerly part of Aquitaine and Occitania. The genetic foundation was based on French native mares, Iberian horses, English Thoroughbreds, Arabians, and Anglo-Arabians. This breed was later influential in the 1958 creation of the Selle Français, a new French horse breed that merged several French regional horse breeds, including the Anglo-Norman horse, into one sport horse type.

With the earliest records of the breed dating back to the 12th century (1100s), with some documents dating the origins of the breed to as early as 506 A.D. and 1063 A.D., Limousin horses were bred during the Middle Ages and the era of the Angevin Empire (French: Espace Plantagenet) during the 12th-13th centuries, when the marriage of Eleanor of Aquitaine, Duchess of Aquitaine, and King Henry II of England, Duke of Normandy and Count of Anjou, brought Aquitaine under the control of the House of Plantagenet and England. Horses were an important resource for the Duchy of Aquitaine for both military purposes and equestrian sports, and early Limousin horses served as mounts for Eleanor of Aquitaine and Aquitainian troops, as well as crusaders to the Holy Land.

Limousin horses are also mentioned in the Chanson d'Antioche (c. 1180) as being used in First Crusade (1096–1099) by knights. Some attribute Turkoman horses and Arabian horses brought back from the Crusades as giving the Limousin its conformation.

A horse of medium size, Leclerc wrote in the 1700s that the best French saddle horses came from Limousin and were quite similar to the Barb horse. It had a great reputation due to its association with French royalty and nobility until the French Revolution, as Limousin provided many horses for the army of King Louis XIV of France and the French cavalry. François Robichon de La Guérinière and Georges-Louis Leclerc de Buffon said the Limousin was "the best horse in France" from the 16th to 19th centuries.

Once used in sports like fox hunting, as well as field hunter and show hunter disciplines, the Limousin horse was also an excellent riding mount, bred largely by French aristocrats, bourgeois, and the Pompadour National Stud Farm at Pompadour Castle in Arnac-Pompadour, Corrèze, France. The two most common breed colors were bay and gray, with the average height of Limousin horses being around 14.2 hands (58 inches, 147 cm) to 15.2 hands (62 inches, 157 cm). The head of the Limousin horse was described as "long, with a convex profile", and it had "strong and small feet" and "excellent agility", being used in light cavalry divisions, as well as in classical dressage.

The use of the breed as a popular cavalry mount led to frequent requisitions under the French First Republic and the First French Empire under Napoleon Bonaparte; and, in particular, for the War in the Vendée and the Napoleonic Wars, which caused the breed to become rare. Crossed with the Arabian and the Thoroughbred horse breeds during the 19th century, then re-converted to horse racing, the purebred Limousin horse largely disappeared before the beginning of the 20th century, in part due to the new popularity of the Anglo-Arabian.

== See also ==
- List of French horse breeds
