= Andravida horse =

Horse breed from Greece

Andravida Horse
- Other names: Eleia Horse
- Country of origin: Greece

The Andravida or Eleia Horse is a light draft breed found in the region of Ilia in Greece. It owes its development to the crossing of Anglo-Norman with local breeds with additional crosses of Nonius stallions after 1920. The breed is close to extinction and its stud book was only established in 1995.

The members of the breed are predominantly brown, bay, chestnut, red roan, black and occasionally grey, though, this tends to be a rare phenomenon. The head is rectangular in shape - quite unremarkable and plain with long ears and a straight profile. The chest is broad and heavy-set with thick muscles; the back is slightly dipped; the shoulders should be well-sloped and the croup only gently so. The horse's legs should be free of excess hair, very strong and thick with good bone. The breed's temperament is described as willing but strong. The breed is of moderate height ranging between 14 and 16 hands (56 and 64 inches, 142 and 163 cm) high with the average being at around 15 hands (60 inches, 152 cm).

The breed is believed to trace to the cavalry horses of Ancient Greece; in the fourth century BC used by the Athenian Army. In peace times, the breed was used to transport goods from remote villages and for riding. Beginning in the 13th century, Arabian blood was introduced to create the lighter strain of this breed. In the 20th century, Anglo-Norman blood was added, but numbers went into decline. The breed was saved from extinction in the early 1990s, when Andravida's Selle Francais stallion Calin de Nanteuil, renamed Pegasus, covered some mares, resulting in 50 healthy foals that went to breeders throughout western Greece. Despite this, however, the breed's numbers are still very low, and they are rarely, if at all, found outside of Ilia, where they are bred almost exclusively.
