= Percheron =

Breed of draft horse from France

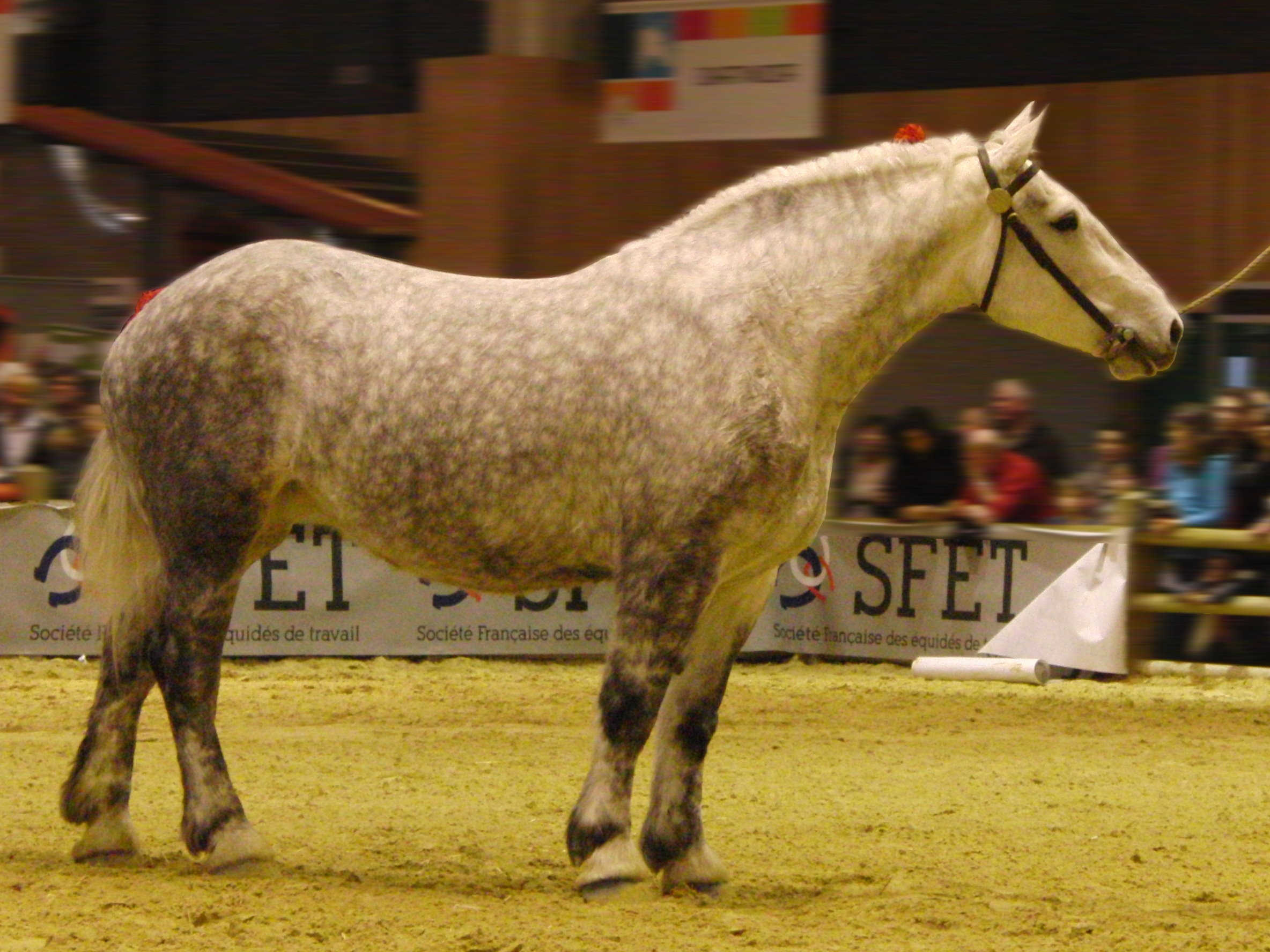

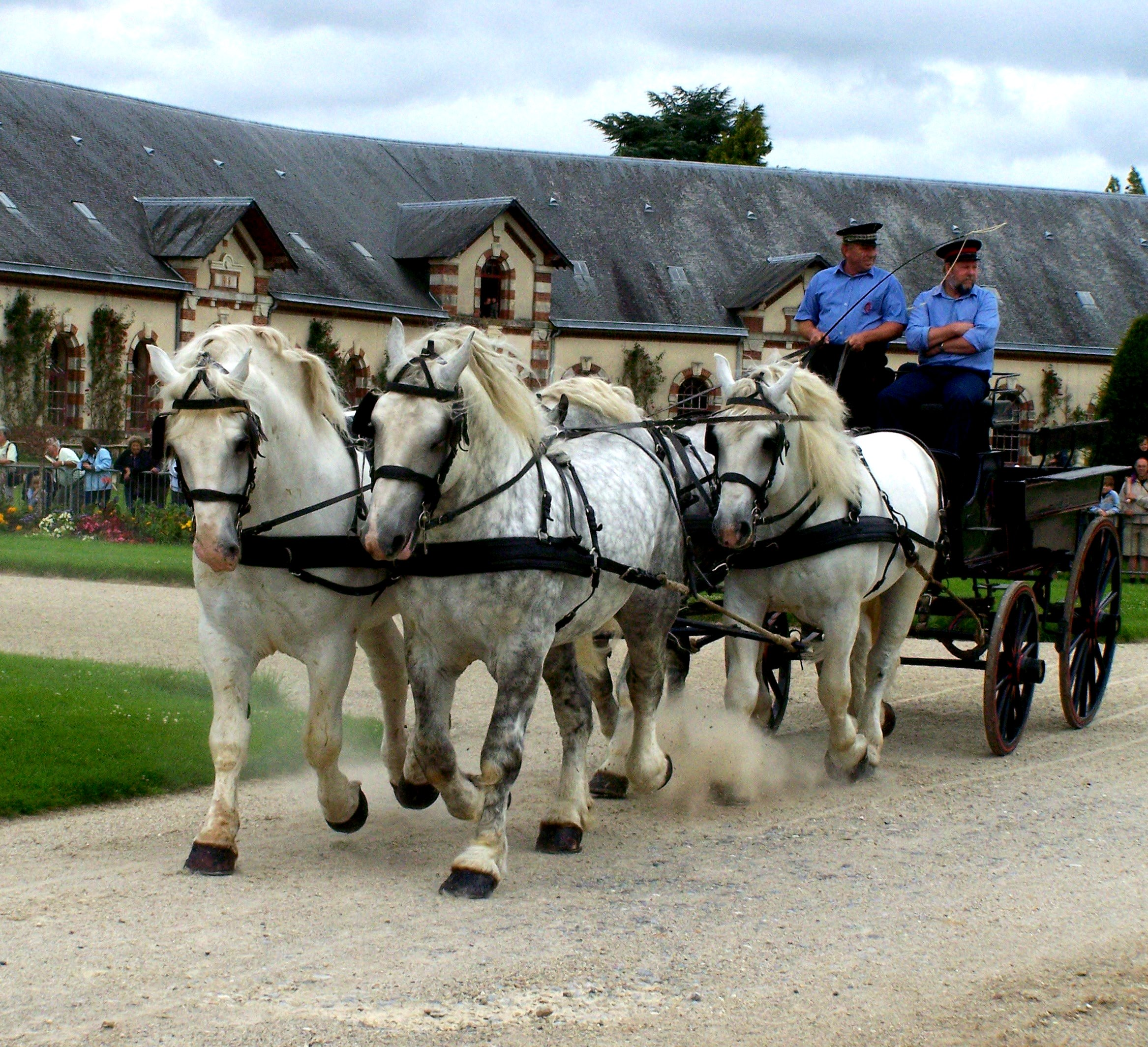
- Country of origin: France

Traits
- Distinguishing features: Draft horse breed. Mostly gray or black. Clean-limbed, powerful and docile.

Breed standards
- Haras nationaux (France); Percheron Horse Association of America; British Percheron Horse Society; Percheron Horse Breeders Association of Australia

The Percheron is a breed of draft horse that originated in the Huisne river valley in western France, part of the former Perche province, from which the breed takes its name. Usually gray or black in color, Percherons are well-muscled, and known for their intelligence and willingness to work. Although their exact origins are unknown, the ancestors of the breed were present in the valley by the 17th century. They are believed to descend from war horses. Over time, they began to be used for pulling stagecoaches; and later, for agriculture and hauling heavy goods. In the late 18th and early 19th centuries, Arabian blood was added to the breed. Exports of Percherons from France rose rapidly in the late 19th century, and the first purely Percheron stud book was created in France in 1893.

Before World War I, thousands of Percherons were shipped from France to the United States, but after the war began, an embargo stopped exports. The breed was used extensively in Europe during the war, with some horses being shipped from the United States back to France to help in the war effort. Beginning in 1918, Percherons began to be bred in the United Kingdom; in 1918, the British Percheron Horse Society (BPHS) was formed. After a series of name and studbook ownership changes, the current United States Percheron breed registry was created in 1934. In the 1930s, Percherons accounted for 70% of the draft horse population in the United States, but their numbers declined substantially after World War II. However, the population began to recover; and, as of 2009, around 2,500 Percheron horses were registered annually in the United States alone.

The breed is still used extensively for draft work; in France, they are also bred for horse meat. They are sometimes crossed with several light horse breeds to produce sport horses. Purebred Percherons are used for forestry work and pulling carriages.

== Characteristics ==
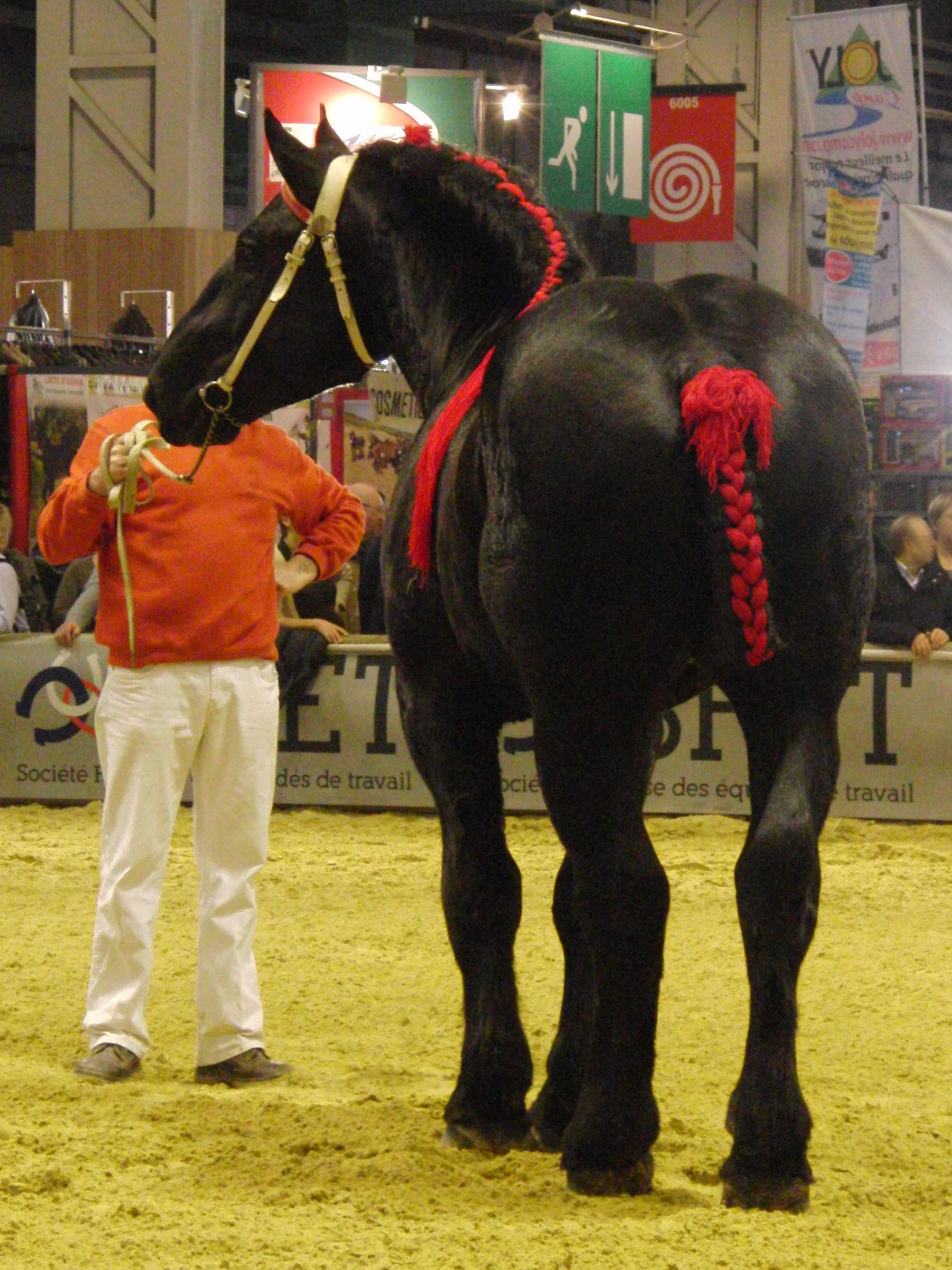
A black Percheron

Percherons are generally gray or black in coloring. The head has a straight profile, broad forehead, large eyes and long thin ears. The chest is deep and wide and the croup long and level. The legs are heavily muscled, and the lower legs have little or no feathering. Enthusiasts describe the temperament as alert, and members of the breed are considered intelligent, willing workers with good dispositions, and easy keepers. In the 19th century, they were known to travel up to 60 kilometres (37 mi) a day at a trot.

The size considered ideal for the Percheron varies between countries. In France, height ranges from 15.1 to 18.1 hands (61 to 73 inches, 155 to 185 cm) and weight from 1,100 to 2,600 pounds (500 to 1,200 kg). Percherons in the United States generally stand between 16.2 and 17.3 hands (66 and 71 inches, 168 and 180 cm), with a range of 15–19 hands (60–76 inches, 152–193 cm). American Percherons average 1,900 pounds (860 kg), and their top weight is around 2,600 pounds (1,200 kg). In Great Britain, 16.2 hands (66 inches, 168 cm) is the shortest acceptable height for stallions and 16.1 hands (65 inches, 165 cm) for mares, while weights range from around 2,000–2,200 pounds (910–1,000 kg) for stallions and 1,800–2,000 pounds (820–910 kg) for mares.

Horses in the French registry are branded on the neck with the intertwined letters "SP", the initials of the Société Hippique Percheronne.

== History ==
The Percheron breed originated in the Huisne river valley in France, which arises in Orne, part of the former Perche province, from which the breed gets its name. Several theories have been put forth as to the ancestry of the breed, though its exact origins are unknown. One source of foundation bloodstock may have been mares captured by Clovis I from the Bretons some time after 496 AD. Another may have been Barb horse cavalry stallions brought from Spain by Moors in the 8th century. The Moorish were defeated at the Battle of Poitiers in 732 AD, and some of their horses may have been taken by warriors from Perche. A final theory posits that the Percheron and the Boulonnais breed are closely related, and that the Boulonnais influenced the Percheron when they were brought to Brittany as reinforcements for the legions of Caesar. It is known that during the 8th century, Barb stallions were crossed with mares native to the area, and more Oriental horse blood was introduced by the Comte du Perche upon his return from the Crusades and expeditions into territory claimed by Spain. Further blood from Spanish breeds was added when Rotrou III imported horses from Castile. No matter the theory of origin, breed historians agree that the terrain and climate of the Perche area had the greatest influence on the development of the breed. A possible reference to the horse is made in the 13th-century romance Guillaume de Dole, in which the title character asks for "the Count of Perche's horse" to be made ready, possibly indicating the "'great horse,' which could accommodate an armored knight" and was bred in the geographical setting of the poem.

During the 17th century, horses from Perche, ancestors of the current Percheron, were smaller, standing between 15 and 16 hands (60 and 64 inches, 152 and 163 cm) high, and more agile. These horses were almost uniformly gray; paintings and drawings from the Middle Ages generally show French knights on mounts of this color. After the days of the armored knight, the emphasis in horse breeding was shifted so as to develop horses better able to pull heavy stage coaches at a fast trot. Gray horses were preferred because their light coloring was more visible at night. This new type of horse was called the "Diligence Horse", because the stage coaches they pulled were named "diligences". After the stage coach was replaced by rail, the modern Percheron type arose as a slightly heavier horse for use in agriculture and heavy hauling work, moving goods from docks to railway terminals.

=== 19th century ===
Arabian stallions were made available to Percheron breeders for use in breeding army mounts, beginning in 1760 at the royal stud at Le Pin. Between 1789 and the early 1800s, the Percheron was in danger of becoming extinct as horse breeding was suppressed during the French Revolution and its aftermath. Early histories of the breed point to two gray Arabian stallions from Le Pin, Godolphin and Gallipoly, as the blood that helped to restart Percheron breeding. However, later research found that Godolphin was a chestnut Arabian of ordinary conformation and no special worth, while Gallipoly was a gray saddle horse of unknown breeding. Modern breed historians contest that there was enough breeding stock left after the early 19th century to restart the breed without further Arabian influence, and state that it is unlikely that two horses of unremarkable breeding and conformation had a significant influence on the breed. Jean le Blanc, a founding stallion of the Percheron breed, was foaled in 1823. Today, all Percherons trace their ancestry to this stallion. At this time the breed also became larger, with horses from other French districts being imported to Perche to change the Percheron from a coach horse averaging 1,200–1,400 pounds (540–640 kg) to a draft horse averaging 2,000 pounds (910 kg). The Percheron stud book was created in France in 1893. By 1910, French registrations had risen to almost 32,000 horses. Between 1880 and 1920, Percheron breeders in France exported horses all over the world, including South Africa, South America, Australia and North America.

==== In the United States and Great Britain ====
Percherons were first imported into the United States in 1839 by Edward Harris II of Moorestown, New Jersey. Only one of the initial four horses survived the ocean trip. Soon after, two stallions and two mares were imported; one mare died shortly after arrival and one stallion went blind and was retired within a year. Although the first importations of Percherons were less than successful, the remaining stallion owned by Edward Harris II, named Diligence, was credited with siring almost 400 foals. In 1851, three stallions were imported: Normandy 351, Louis Napoleon 281 and Gray Billy. Throughout their stud careers, each had significant influence on American draft horse stock. In the mid-19th century in the United States, Percheron stallions were crossed with homebred mares to improve the local stock, resulting in thousands of crossbred horses. After the American Civil War in the 1860s greatly reduced the number of horses, there was a significant need for large draft horses, especially in growing cities and in the expanding West. Large numbers of Percherons were imported to the United States beginning in the early 1870s, and they became popular with draft horse breeders and owners. In the 1880s, approximately 7,500 horses were exported to the United States. This extensive importation lasted until 1893, when the US experienced a financial panic, and virtually no Percheron imports occurred between 1894 and 1898. In addition, many existing horses were lost as people were too poor to purchase or care for large draft horses. In 1898, importations began again as abruptly as they had ceased, with an average of 700 horses a year imported between 1898 and 1905. In 1906 alone, over 13,000 horses were imported to the United States from France. In the American traveling circuses of the late 19th century and early 20th century, the Percheron was the most frequently seen draft horse. Drivers appreciated the breed's agility, stamina and quick-footed gait.

In 1876, the Norman-Percheron Association was formed by a group of Percheron breeders in Chicago, and at the same time the stud book was begun. The Norman-Percheron Association was the United States' first purebred livestock association. In 1877, the word "Norman" was dropped from the name. Later, in the panic of 1893, the Percheron Association went bankrupt and ceased to function. In 1905, also in Chicago, Percheron breeders met again to reform as the Percheron Society of America. Since 1934, the group has been known as the Percheron Horse Association of America. At its height, the organization was the largest draft horse association in the world, in the early 20th century registering over 10,000 horses annually.

In the late 19th century, Percherons also began to be exported from the United States to Great Britain, where they were used to pull horse-drawn buses in large cities. The first Percherons imported to Britain included some of the thousands of crossbreds from the United States. In Britain, many of the horses, once they finished their bus-pulling career, were sold to farmers. Other imported horses were sold to the British Army, and in 1900, 325 horses were shipped to South Africa for use in the Boer War.

=== 20th and 21st centuries ===
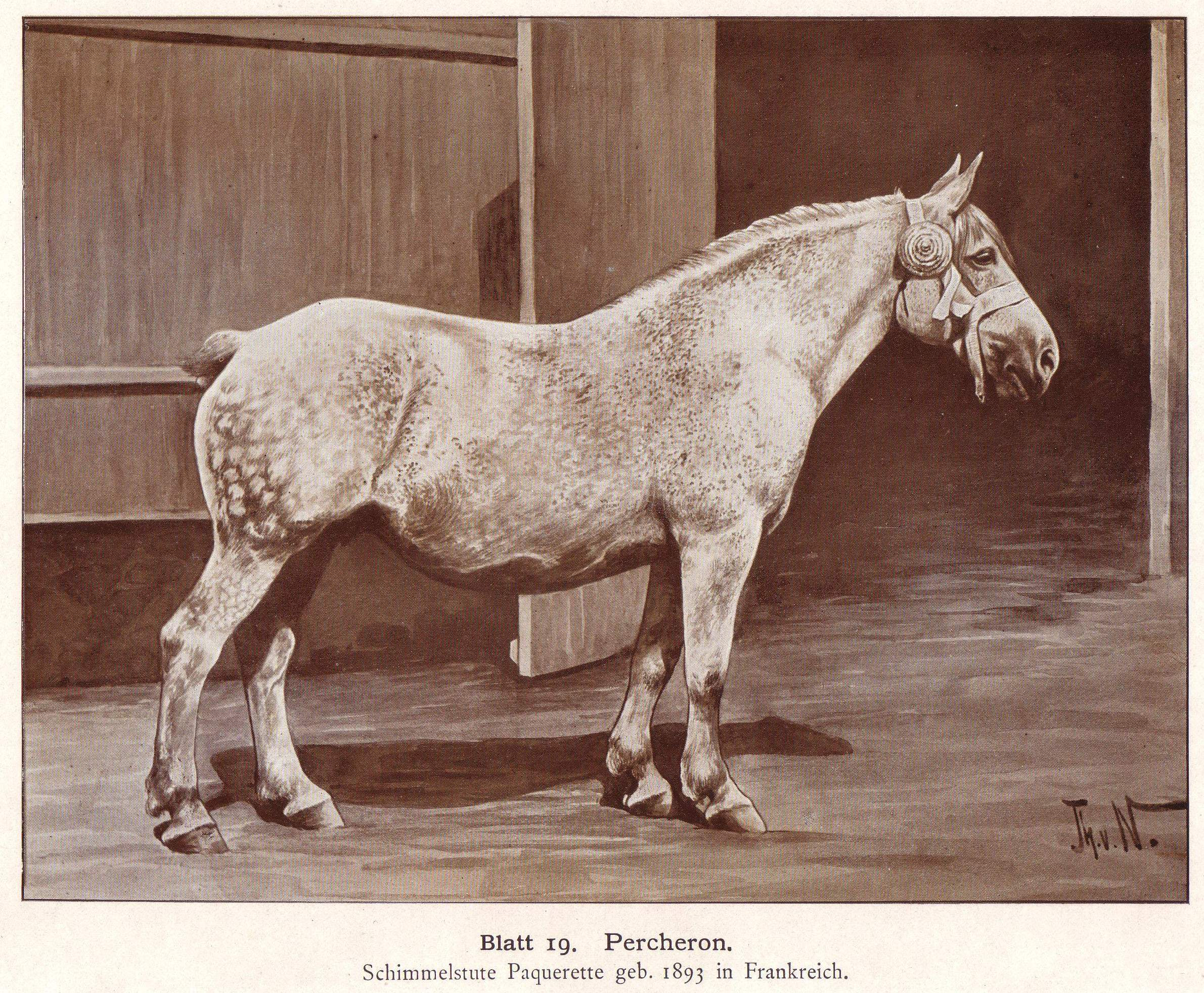
A 1904 drawing of a Percheron

In 1911, the French society restricted registration to horses with both parents already registered with the society. In the early 20th century, the Percheron was one of the four major draft horse breeds, along with the Belgian, the Clydesdale and the Shire. Breeders could sell their horses for significant amounts of money, especially in the United States and Canada, where breeding stock brought a premium price.

Prior to World War I, a flourishing trade route for Percherons existed between Nogent-le-Rotrou, Le Havre and the United States. However, after the war began, an embargo was placed on French Percherons, disallowing them from exportation. Other than an exception in April 1916 to allow 59 horses to be shipped from France to the US, this embargo remained in place until the end of the war. The war took its toll on the Percheron breed as horses, fodder, and handlers were requisitioned for the fighting, and even after the embargo was lifted France did not have the quality or quantity of stock to fulfill the needs of American breeders. The embargo created a breeding boom in the US, replacing the previous practice of importing the majority of Percherons from France, and late in the war horses were shipped the other way – from the US to Europe – to supply those needed in the war. The lack of feathering on the Percheron's lower legs made them easier to care for in the mud that they often worked in during wartime. Their quick trot on paved roads made them more versatile than motorized vehicles, and they were useful for work with guns and in forward units due to their calm temperaments.

Between 1918 and 1922, over 350 Percherons were imported to Britain from France and, combined with stock from the US and Canada, were used as breeding stock to establish the breed in the country. In 1918, the British Percheron Horse Society was formed. British breeders and owners continue to import Percherons from France, and also occasionally from Canada, when not prohibitively expensive.

By the 1930s, Percherons accounted for over 70 percent of the purebred draft horses in the United States, and all of the major land-grant universities maintained stables of Percherons. A 1930 census of horses found over 33,000 Percherons in the United States, with the next most popular breed, the Belgian, having a population of less than 10,000. One Percheron historian attributes this popularity to the breed's "strength, energy, activity, robustness and endurance". After World War II, increasing mechanization prompted a decline in the Percheron population. In 1954, only 85 Percherons were registered in the US, a record low. The 1950s, 1960s and early 1970s were bad years for the US Percheron population, and breeding was reduced to only a few farms. These breeders kept the American population alive through these years, however, and the 1980s saw renewed interest in the breed.

In 1966, the French stud book was changed to include draft types from other areas of France that were closely related to the Percheron—including the horses of Berrichon, Nivernais, Marne, Augeron, Bourbonnais, Loire and Saône-et-Loire. French Percherons were also hit hard by the advent of mechanization, and between 1970 and 1990 focus was placed on breeding horses of greater mass for the meat market. The largest and heaviest stallions were selected for breeding. Beginning at the 1989 World Percheron Congress, French breeders realized that they needed a lighter breed for tourism, export to Japan for draft work, and other markets. In 1993, a trend of importing American stallions to France was started with the black stallion Silver Shadows Sheik. This stallion and others were used to create a more elegant, smaller and sleeker look in the French Percheron, while still retaining the traditional bone and foot structure. All the imported stallions were black, reviving the popularity of black Percherons in France. French breeders continue to import American-bred Percheron stallions in order to produce lighter foals, moving away from the heavier meat-type horses of the late 20th century. Also in 1993, the Société Hippique Percheronne anticipated the increasing tourist and exportation markets by prohibiting docking, which was not prohibited for other draft breeds until 1996. This was partly at the request of the Germans, and partly due to the influence of magazines such as Cheval.

In 1988, there were 1,088 Percherons in the United States, rising to 2,257 by 1998. As of 2009, the Percheron Horse Association of America had horses registered in all 50 states, and had nearly 3,000 members, with around 2,500 new horses being registered annually. The French Société Hippique Percheronne de France (Percheron Horse Society of France) registered between 750 and 885 horses in each year between 2007 and 2010.

=== Augeron ===
The Augeron, also known as Caen or Virois, was developed from the Percheron during the 19th century and was merged back into the Percheron in the 1960s. Bred mainly in the Pays d'Auge region, it previously had its own studbook, registered by the Société hippique du trait augeron. The status of the subtype has been repeatedly debated because of its origin from Percherons bred in Pays d'Auge, a breeding group that was modified from the original breed standard due to the influence of soil and climate over the years, creating the Augeron type. Augerons are light gray in color, tall, strong, well-built, and energetic. They stand 158–170 cm (15.2–16.3 hands) in height, but those horses bred in Vire are known to be smaller than the standard.

In the 19th century, the existence of the Augeron population was, despite its popularity, generally ignored by authors. (Note: Original quote in French: "généralement passée sous silence par les auteurs") In Paris, they were named "Caen" and "Virois", after their region of origin, although specialists included the "Caen Virois" breed with the Augeron in a 1904 text. In the 19th century, these horses were sold at fairs in Argences and Bayeux in Lower Normandy. They were noticed several times for their homogeneity, beauty, and high value. In 1858, Augerons were sold for between 600 and 1200 francs.

The Société hippique du trait augeron, or Augeron Horse Society, was formed in 1913 by breeders in Auge to record these horses in a breed registry. One reason for this lay in the desire to protect the cradle of breeding Percheron horses: only animals born near the Perche were entitled to registration in the studbook, and hence to use the name of "Percheron". This limitation excluded several nearby populations of horses foaled outside of Perche, such as the Maine and the Augeron.

== Uses ==
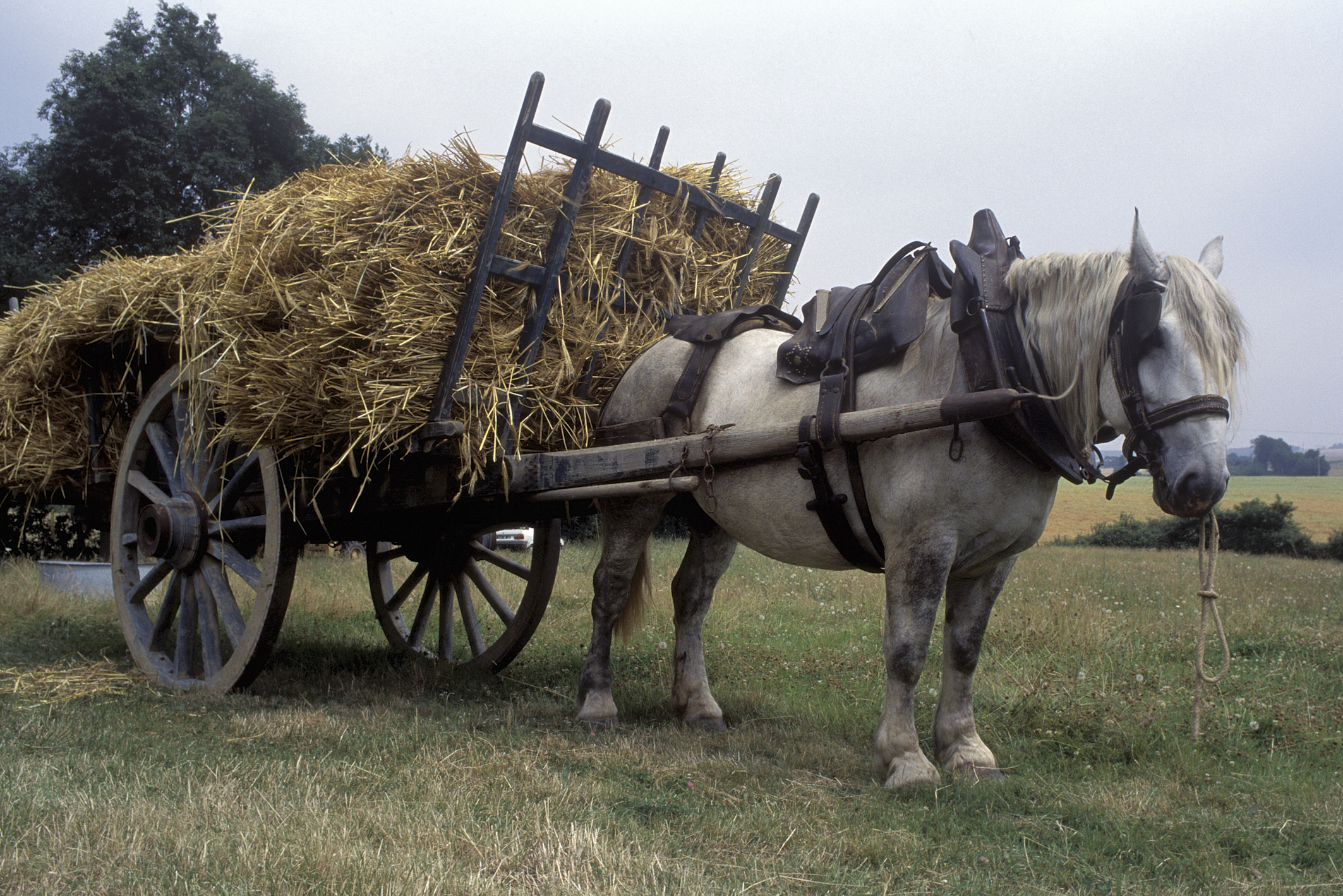
Percheron pulling a heavy farm cart in France

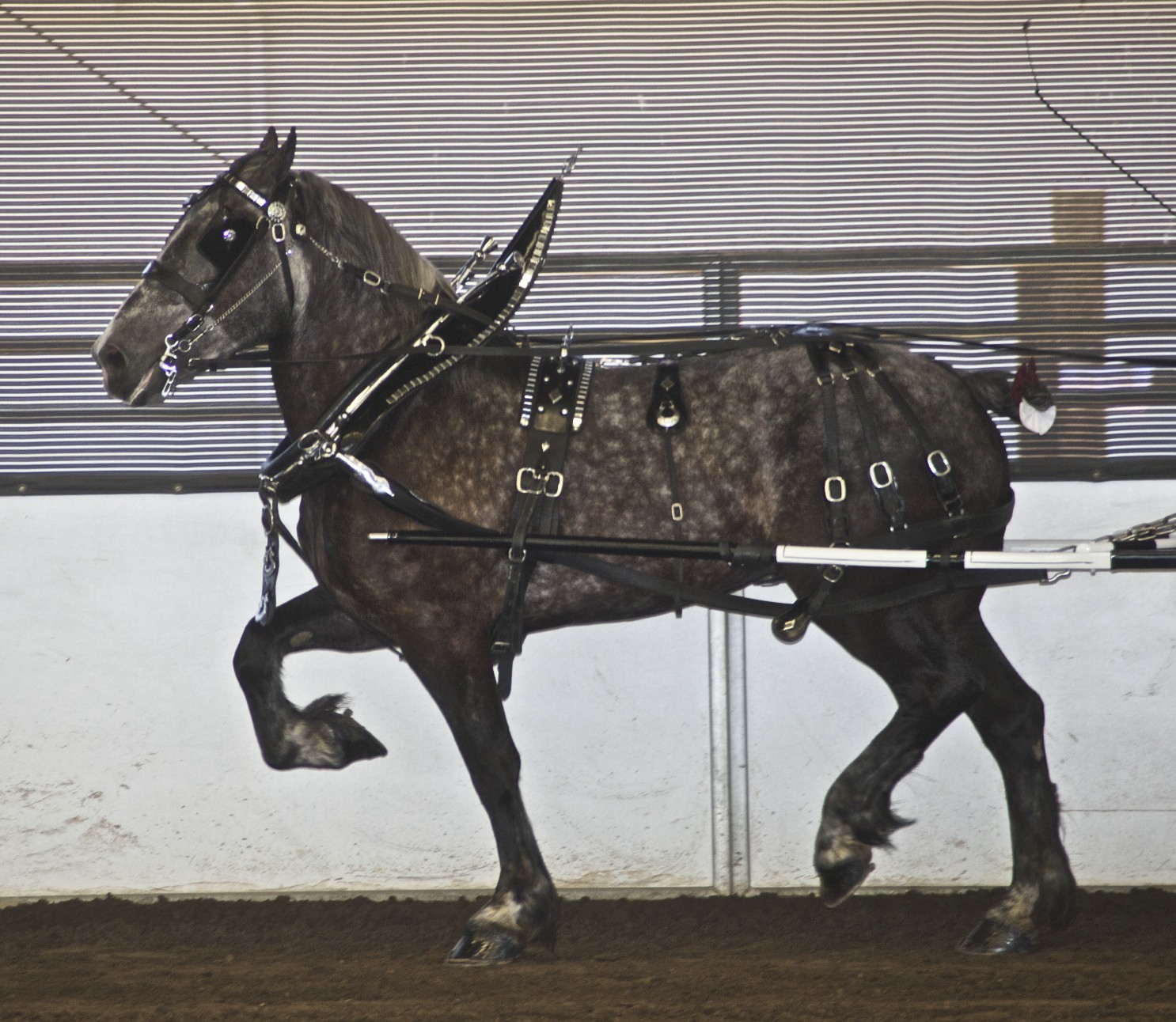
A Percheron pulling a cart in a horse show competition

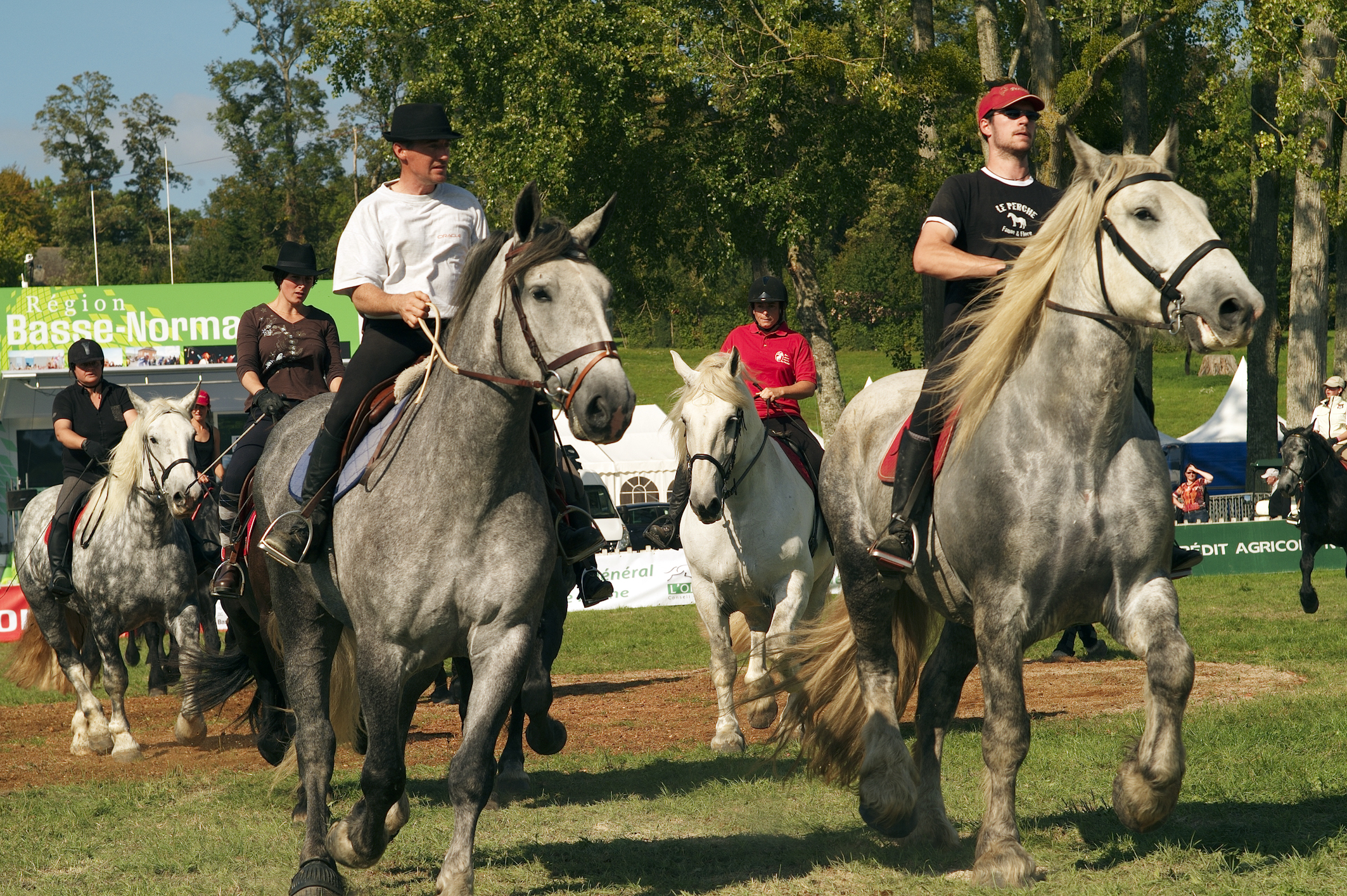
Percherons being ridden

The Percheron is the most famous and populous of all French draft breeds in the world today. They were used to improve both the Ardennes and Vladimir Heavy Draft horses, and to create the Spanish-Norman breed, a cross between the Andalusian and the Percheron. By the end of the 19th century, Percherons made up the majority of driving horses in Paris. The Percheron is still used extensively for draft work and, like other draft breeds, it is also used in France for meat production. Around the world, Percherons are used for parades, sleigh rides and hayrides, as well as being used to pull carriages in large cities. The largest team of working Percherons in Europe is found at Disneyland Paris, where the breed makes up 30 percent of the horses in the park and the horses work to pull trams on the main park street. One of the most famous horse teams in the United States is the Heinz hitch of Percherons, having appeared multiple times at the Tournament of Roses Parade.

In Great Britain, the Percheron is used for advertising and publicity, as well as forestry work and farm work. They are crossbred with lighter horses by breeders of heavy hunters in order to increase size and improve disposition. Crossbred Percherons have been used successfully in dressage. In both the Falkland Islands and northern Australia, Percherons have been crossed with local mares, primarily Criollos in the Falklands, to produce larger stock horses with greater stamina. These crossbred horses are used extensively in both the sub-Antarctic climate of the Falklands and the sub-tropical climate of Australia for working stock. In Australia they are also crossed with Thoroughbreds for use as mounted police horses.

In 1978, the first World Percheron Congress was held in Great Britain, and has been held annually ever since. Although the majority of the shows have been held in North America, four – in 1980, 1989, 2001 and 2011 – have been held in France. Each year, in July, the French national breed show is held in Haras du Pin.

Since the early 2000s the United States Army's Fort Sam Houston Caisson and Funeral Honors Platoon have used Percherons for pulling the casket-bearing military caisson during funeral details. As of 2019, the Fort Sam Houston Caisson Platoon had 11 working Percherons and one lighter horse used as the riderless horse in a funeral procession. In addition to funeral details, which they perform year round, the Caisson Percherons are routinely featured at the San Antonio Stock Show & Rodeo and other United States Army recruiting events in the south Texas area.

== Sources ==
- Audiot, Annick (1995). Races d'hier pour l'élevage de demain: Espaces ruraux (in French). Éditions Quae. ISBN 978-2-7380-0581-6.
- Bongianni, Maurizio, ed. (1988). Simon & Schuster's Guide to Horses and Ponies. Simon & Schuster, Inc. ISBN 978-0-671-66068-0.
- Dal'Secco, Emmanuelle (2006). Les chevaux de trait (in French). Artemis Éditions. ISBN 978-2-84416-459-9.
- Dugast, Jean-Léo (2007). Sur les traces du cheval percheron. L'Étrave. ISBN 978-2-909599-80-9.
- Edwards, Elwyn Hartley (2006). Les chevaux (in French). De Borée. ISBN 978-2-84494-449-8.
- Edwards, Elwyn Hartley (1994). The Encyclopedia of the Horse (1st American ed.). Dorling Kindersley. ISBN 978-1-56458-614-8.
- Fox, Charles Philip (1983). Circus Baggage Stock: A Tribute to the Percheron. Heart Prairie Press. ISBN 978-0-9622663-0-0.
- Mavré, Marcel (2004). Attelages et attelées : un siècle d'utilisation du cheval de trait [Hitches and harness: a century of using the workhorse] (in French). France Agricole Éditions. ISBN 978-2-85557-115-7.
- McDermott, Rowena (1998). "The British Percheron". The Working Horse Manual. Farming Press. ISBN 978-0-85236-401-7.
- Mischka, Joseph (1991). The Percheron Horse in America. Heart Prairie Press. ISBN 978-0-9622663-5-5.
- Roger, Alain & Beaune, Jean-Claude (1991). Maîtres et protecteurs de la nature. Éditions Champ Vallon. ISBN 978-2-87673-099-1.
- Terry, Patricia; Nancy Vine Durling (1993). The Romance of the Rose or Guillaume De Dole. University of Pennsylvania Press. ISBN 978-0-8122-1388-1.
