= Nivernais horse =

Extinct breed of horse

Nivernais
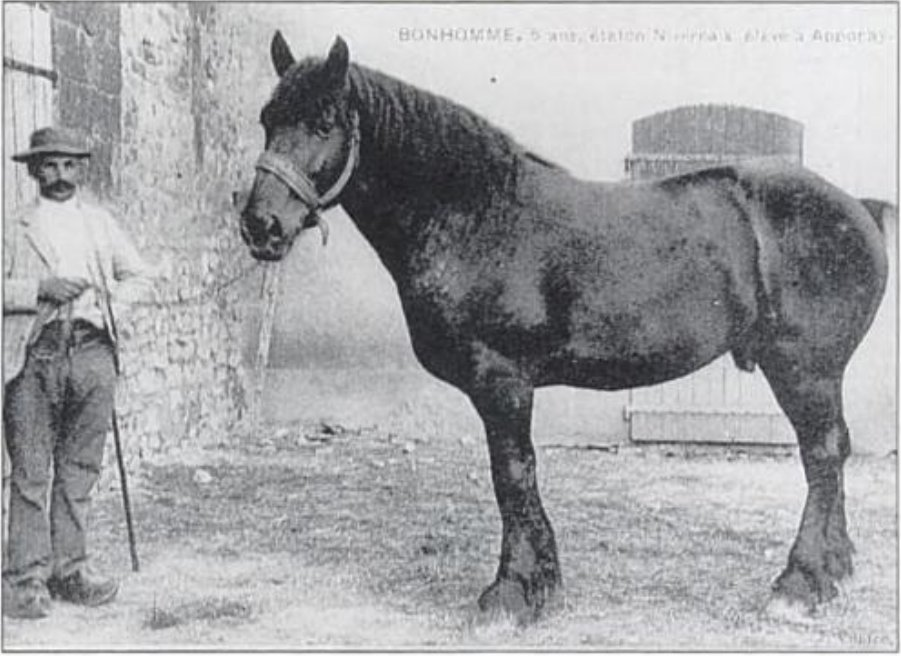
- Bonhomme, a 5-year-old Nivernais stallion, at Rémilly in the Nièvre in 1919
- Conservation status: endangered
- Country of origin: Nièvre, France

The Nivernais is an endangered breed of heavy draught horse from the Nièvre area of central France. It is always black. It stands about 165–175 centimetres at the withers, occasionally up to 180 cm, and weighs 800–1000 kg. The breed was created in the Nièvre in 1872 by the Comte de Bouillé by crossing black Percheron stallions with local Cheval du Morvan mares. A stud book was opened in 1880, and from that time the breed largely supplanted the Cheval du Morvan. The population declined from the 1950s following the mechanisation of agriculture, and in 1966 the stud-book was merged with that of the Percheron. Since the 1980s various efforts have been made to preserve the breed. Without official recognition in France, it is listed in DAD-IS by the FAO.

== See also ==
- List of French horse breeds
