= Opisthotonus =

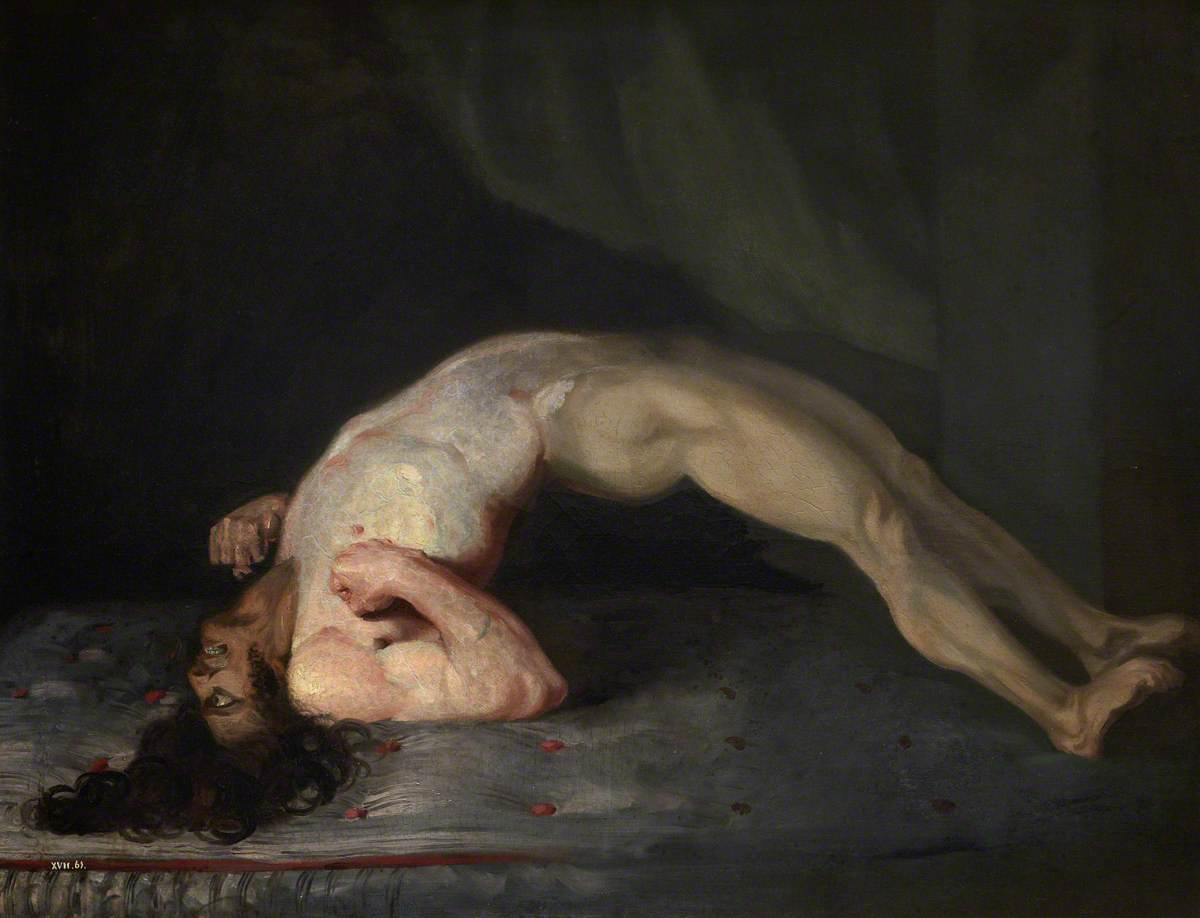
- Opisthotonus in a patient suffering from tetanus. Painting by Sir Charles Bell, 1809.
- Specialty: Neurology
- Symptoms: Abnormal posturing

Opisthotonus or opisthotonos (from Ancient Greek: ὄπισθεν, romanized: opisthen, lit. 'behind' and τόνος, tonos, 'tension') is a state of severe hyperextension and spasticity in which an individual's head, neck and spinal column enter into a complete "bridging" or "arching" position.

This extreme arched pose is an extrapyramidal effect and is caused by spasm of the axial muscles along the spinal column. Among extant animals it naturally occurs in birds, snakes suffering from advanced boid inclusion body disease, and placental mammals; it is also observed in some articulated dinosaur fossils.

== Causes ==
Opisthotonus is a symptom of some cases of severe cerebral palsy and traumatic brain injury, or as a result of the severe muscular spasms associated with tetanus. It can be a feature of severe acute hydrocephalus, poisoning, and drowning.

=== Infants ===
Opisthotonus is more pronounced in infants. Opisthotonus in the neonate may be a symptom of meningitis, tetanus, severe kernicterus, or the rare maple syrup urine disease. This marked extensor tone can cause infants to "rear backwards" and stiffen out as the mother or nurse attempts to hold or feed them. Individuals with opisthotonus are quite challenging to position, especially in wheelchairs and car seats.

Opisthotonus can be triggered by any attempt at movement, such as smiling, feeding, speech, or by involuntary movement, such as seizures. A similar tonic posturing may be seen in Sandifer syndrome.

=== Poisoning ===
Opisthotonus can sometimes be seen in lithium intoxication. It is a rare extrapyramidal side effect of phenothiazines, haloperidol, and metoclopramide.

Opisthotonus with the presence of the risus sardonicus is also a symptom of strychnine poisoning and prussic acid (hydrogen cyanide) poisoning.

=== Drowning and the "dinosaur death pose" ===
Opisthotonus is seen with drowning victims – called the "opisthotonic death pose". This pose is also common in complete dinosaur skeletal fossils and it has been suggested that this is due to the animal drowning or being immersed in water soon after death.

=== Vivisection ===
Opisthotonus can be produced experimentally in animals by transection of the midbrain (between the superior colliculus and the inferior colliculus), which results in severing all the corticoreticular fibers.

Severe "arching" (hyperextension) occurs due to stimulus by the anterior reticulospinal tract caused by the loss of the balancing inhibitory counter-stimulus of corticoreticular fibers, which normally act upon the pons reticular formation.

=== Other causes ===
Opisthotonus is also described as a potential CNS symptom of heat stroke along with bizarre behavior, hallucinations, decerebrate rigidity, oculogyric crisis, and cerebellar dysfunction.

Opisthotonus is a symptom of "lavender foal syndrome", a lethal genetic disorder in horses.

Sir Rudolph Peters, in Oxford, introduced thiamine-deprived pigeons as a model for understanding how thiamine deficiency can lead to the pathological-physiological symptoms of beriberi. Feeding them polished rice caused opisthotonos, and if not treated they died after a few days. Administration of thiamine at the stage of opisthotonos led to a complete cure within 30 minutes. As no morphological modifications were observed in the brain of the pigeons before and after treatment with thiamine, Peters introduced the concept of a biochemical lesion.
