= Auvergne (disambiguation) =

Auvergne is a region in France.

Named after it are:

- Auvergne horse
- Bleu d'Auvergne, a cheese originating in Auvergne
- Régiment d'Auvergne, a former regiment of the French Army from the province of Auvergne
- Rural Municipality of Auvergne No. 76, Saskatchewan, Canada
- Auvergne Station, a cattle station in the Northern Territory of Australia
