= French Anglo-Arab =

Horse breed

Anglo-Arab (AA)
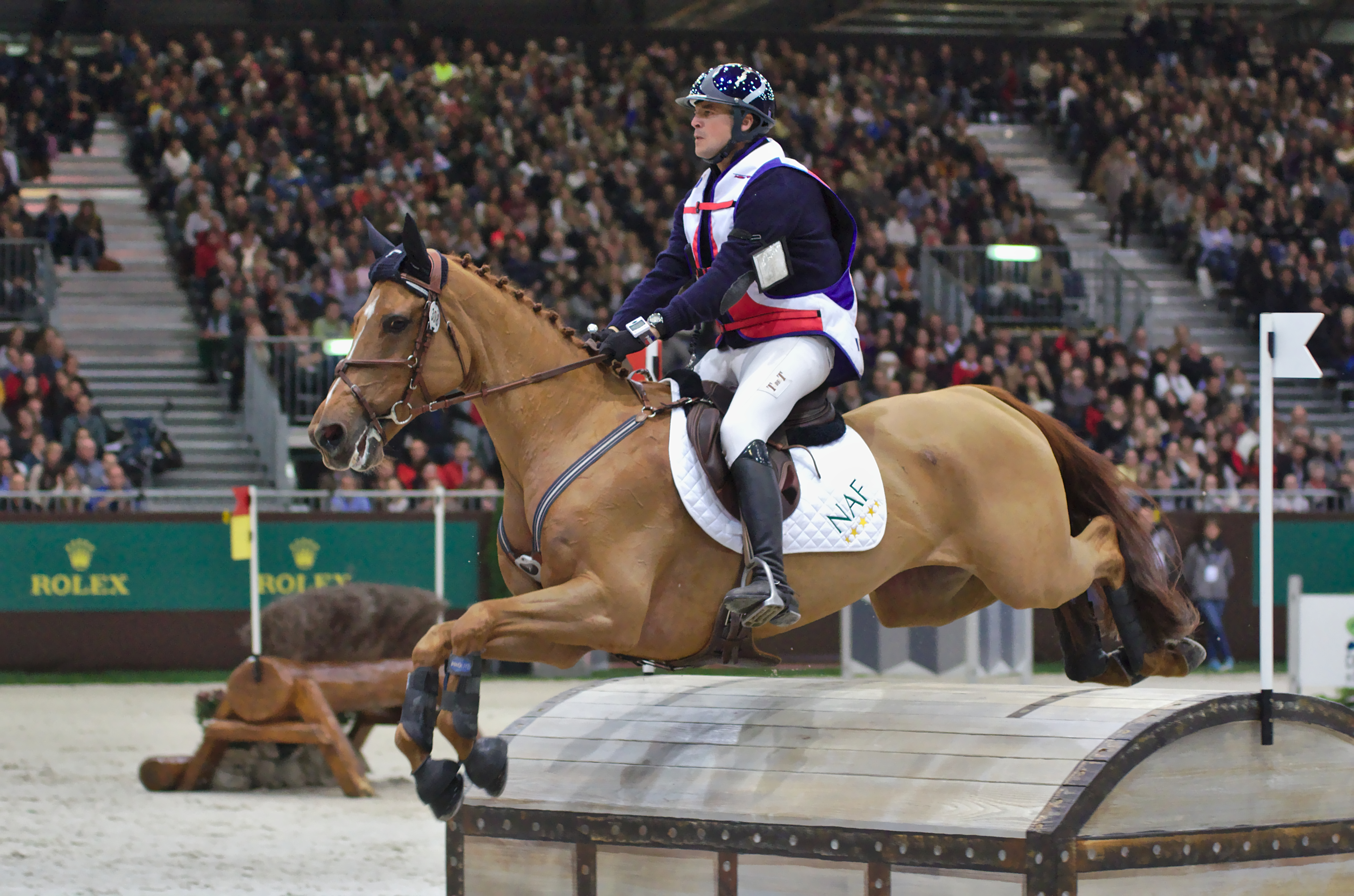
- Pégase du Tuc, an Anglo-Arabian mare born in 2003, ridden by Karim Florent Laghouag at the Geneva International Horse Show in 2014.
- Country of origin: France
- Use: Eventing, show jumping, racing, dressage

Traits
- Weight: 450 kg-550 kg
- Height: 1.58 m-1.65 m
- Color: Generally bay, chestnut, or gray, but all colors are permitted
- Distinguishing features: Small, elegant, and slender head with a rather straight, even snub nose. High-performing, courageous, and intelligent. A lively and determined horse with a strong character.

The French Anglo-Arab is a hot-blooded riding horse breed, originating from crosses between the Thoroughbred and the Arabian. Initial crossings are believed to have occurred in the late 18th century. In the 1840s, breeding was undertaken at the Haras national du Pin (National Stud of Le Pin) and later expanded to include two local breeds from southwestern France, in Limousin and the Midi.

The French Anglo-Arab shows morphological variability, influenced by the respective proportions of its Thoroughbred and Arabian ancestry. It is generally noted for its gaits, lightness, agility, courage, and strong temperament. Within the breed, specific terms distinguish the proportion of Arabian blood and the presence of other minor bloodlines: Anglo-Arab, Complementary Anglo-Arab, Crossbred Anglo-Arab, and Half-blood Anglo-Arab. The official abbreviation is AA, and the breed is commonly referred to as “anglo.”

The Anglo-Arab remains prevalent in southwestern France and is recognized for its sporting achievements, particularly in show jumping until the 1980s and more recently in eventing. Dedicated flat and obstacle races are organized for the breed in several Mediterranean countries. In France, racing-oriented breeding has remained relatively stable for about two decades, while sport-oriented breeding has declined. Foal numbers decreased significantly in the 2000s, leading to its classification as a “threatened” breed.

== Name ==
The French Anglo-Arab is recognized internationally as a breed of French origin, though Thoroughbred–Arabian crosses have been and continue to be produced in various countries under different names. Hippologist and stud director Eugène Gayot is often credited with promoting the breed and the name "Anglo-Arab". In 1850, he described the Pompadour stud as having created the "purebred Anglo-Arab", later referred to as the "French Thoroughbred", a distinct breed. Although Gayot popularized the term "Anglo-Arab", including through his publications, it had been used as early as 1846. The name was used sporadically in the 1850s before being made official in 1861, at which point "French Thoroughbred" was discontinued. The breed is now often informally referred to as "the anglo".

== Breed history ==
The French Anglo-Arab is the result of crossing the Arabian and the Thoroughbred. While similar crosses are made in many countries, selective breeding in France during the 19th century led to its recognition as a distinct breed. It is regarded, alongside the Selle Français, as one of the two principal hot-blooded riding horse breeds of French origin.

The development of the French Anglo-Arab is closely linked to the policies of the French national studs in the 19th century. Crossbreeding efforts in the Tarbes region and in Limousin, including the creation of the “Tarbes horse,” preceded its establishment under the direction of Raoul de Bonneval, Antonin Laurent Chébrou de Lespinats, and Eugène Gayot. Initially bred for military remounts, the breed was later oriented towards racing, with the first sport horses emerging in the 20th century.

=== Beginnings ===
The earliest documented crossings of Thoroughbreds and Arabians in France occurred in the late 18th century under the initiative of the national studs. The establishment of studs at Tarbes and Pau in 1806 aimed to supply horses for Napoleon I’s armies. These studs housed Barbs, Andalusians, and Arabians, and conducted numerous crosses that also influenced private breeders in the region. Napoleon expressed a particular appreciation for the Arabian breed.

In 1806, five Arabian stallions and five Arabian mares from Egypt were sent to Pompadour National Stud Farm, leading to the development of the Limousin Anglo-Arab. At the Tarbes stud, Arabian stallions, along with some of Turkish and Persian origin, were introduced into Béarn and Navarre and crossed with the remaining Navarrese broodmares. This produced the “Tarbes horse” or “Tarbesian,” a tall, enduring, and elegant animal suitable for light draft work and riding, meeting the size requirements for light cavalry but rarely exceeding 1.52 m in height. Unrecorded Anglo-Arab births may have occurred in the Limousin region, as departmental statistics indicate the presence of Thoroughbreds from 1778 and Arabians from 1789.

=== Creation and development of the breed in the 19th century ===
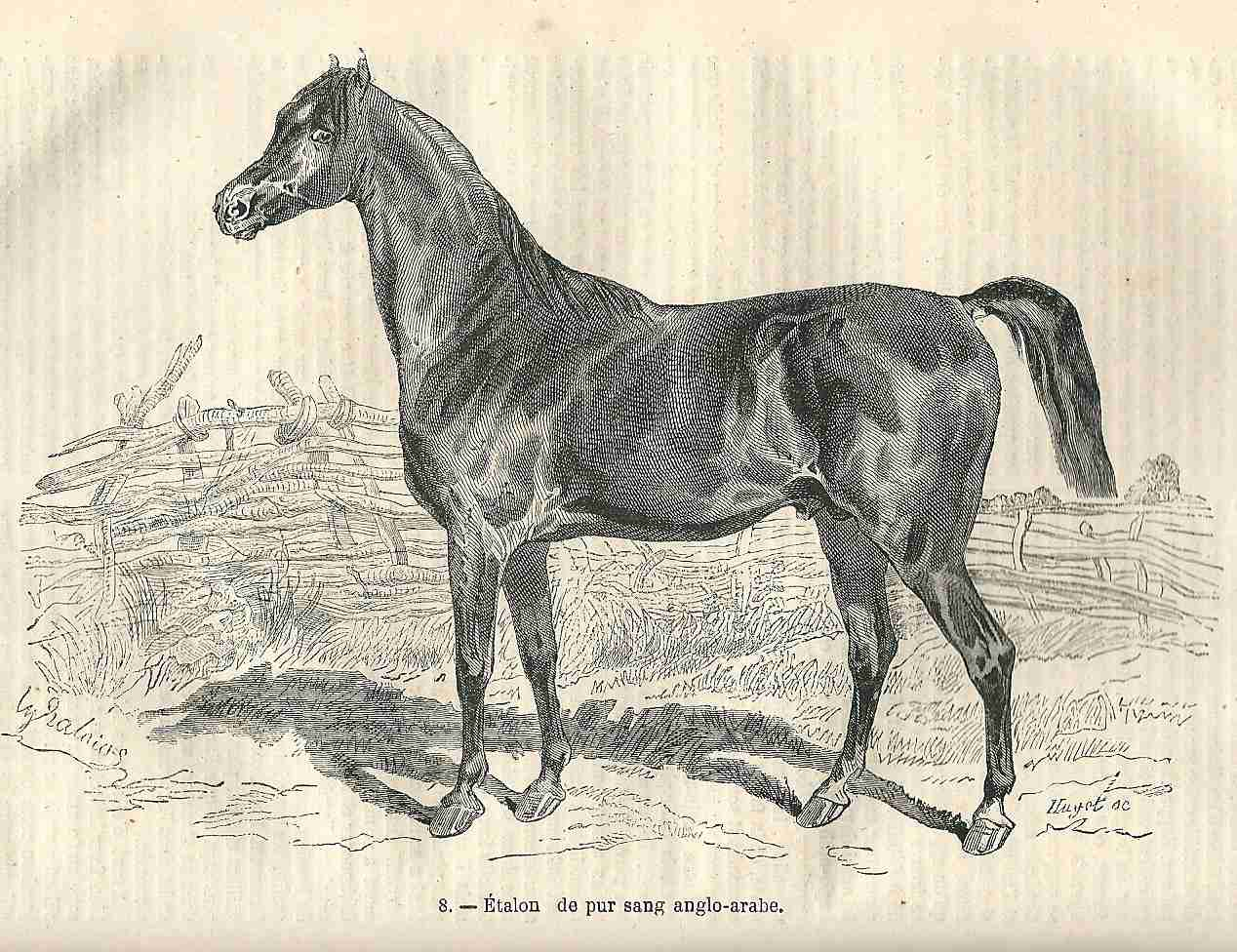
Engraving of an Anglo-Arabian stallion in the Practical Encyclopedia for Farmers, published by Firmin-Didot et Cie, volume 5, 1877

==== Raoul de Bonneval ====
Under the direction of the National Stud administration, the Anglo-Arab breed was established in the first half of the 19th century, around the 1840s. Raoul de Bonneval crossed Thoroughbreds, valued for their speed, with Arabian horses, considered classic improvers. This breeding involved two Arabian stallions, Massoud and Aslan (the latter of Turkish origin), and three Thoroughbred mares imported from England: Selim Mare, Dear, and Comus Mare. Their offspring, including Delphine, Galatée, and Danae, and subsequent descendants such as Agar and Quine, formed the foundation of the first sport horse breed in France. The initial Anglo-Arab broodmare band was created at the Haras du Pin, while the Rosières-aux-Salines stud also bred animals from similar crosses. These horses, later brought to Pompadour, formed the basis for the breed’s development.

==== Eugène Gayot and Antonin Laurent Chebrou de Lespinats ====
The breed’s development was notably advanced by Eugène Gayot, director of the Haras du Pin and Pompadour, who promoted its production. He advocated crossing the Anglo-Arab with local breeds such as the Limousin and Tarbais to produce an intermediate type combining qualities of both the Arabian and the Thoroughbred while avoiding their respective drawbacks. Interest in the Arabian horse increased in the 1830s, partly due to the French conquest of Algeria, which renewed attention to a breed already valued during the Napoleonic era. Southern France was regarded as a favorable breeding area, and Gayot considered Anglo-Arab stallions superior to other local breeds of the Southwest, noting that they replaced half-blood Arabians and pure Navarrin horses to advantage.

Antonin Laurent Chebrou de Lespinats supervised the Arabian stallions Massoud and Nichab upon their arrival at the Haras du Pin and, in 1833, managed Arabian mares imported from Hungary. Through exchanges of breeding stock, he contributed to the growth of private breeding in southwestern France, facilitating the gradual spread of the Anglo-Arab.

==== Selection and development ====
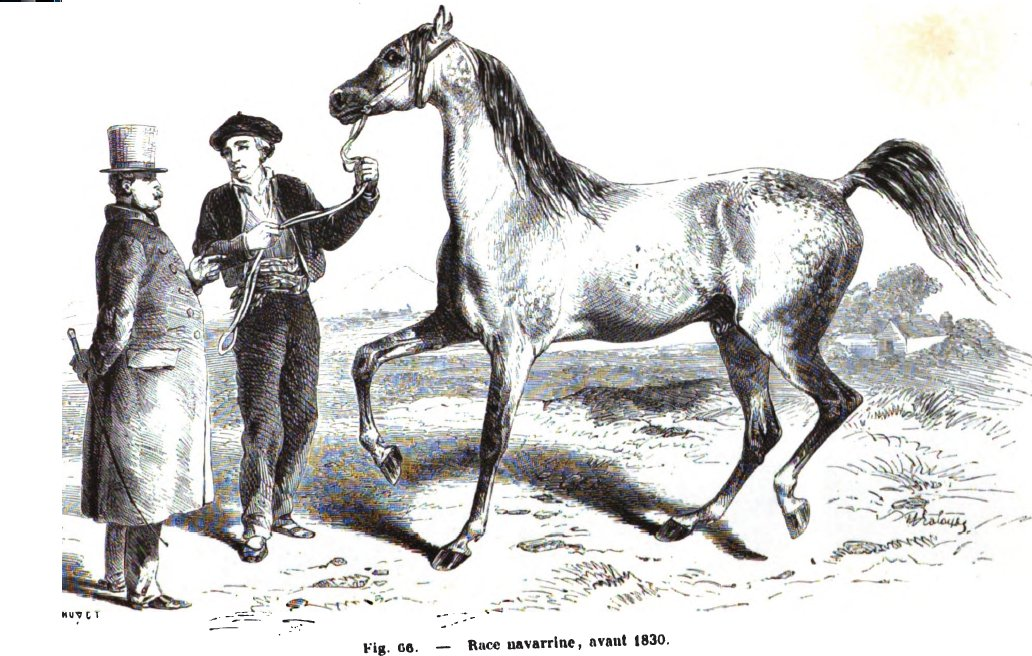
The Navarrin horse is one of the native breeds crossed in the 19th century to produce the Anglo-Arabian.

The breed initially attracted limited interest, with breeders mainly from wealthy backgrounds. Early production focused on racehorses and luxury mounts. Competition from the Anglo-Norman, a carriage horse, led some breeders to pursue crosses with that breed, reducing attention to the Anglo-Arab. As economic liberalism advanced, the State gradually reduced its involvement in production. In 1861, the Pompadour broodmare band, comprising 46 mares and fillies, was disbanded in favor of private breeding. That same year, the first races reserved for Anglo-Arabs were held in southwestern France.

The reform of the stud farms under the law of May 29, 1874, promoted the development of Anglo-Arab breeding for light cavalry. The Pau-Gelos National Stud Farm, near Pau, and later the Limousin, played a role in the breed’s selection by crossing mares from Tarbes and the Limousin with Thoroughbred and Arabian stallions.

===== In the Béarn and near Tarbes =====
The Thoroughbred, and later the Arabian, was crossed with the Navarrin horse, a Spanish-origin breed of small, flat build but notable robustness. The Navarre horse was gradually absorbed into the Anglo-Arab, particularly at the Tarbes Stud Farm. Although the breeding program officially ended in 1852, the name “Navarre horse” persisted locally for some time. Records from the Tarbes stallion depot document this transition: in 1830, it listed six Thoroughbred stallions, five Arabian stallions, twenty-three crossbred Arabians, and nineteen Navarre stallions. By 1850, all pure Navarre stallions had disappeared, replaced by twenty-five Thoroughbreds and twenty-seven Arabians.

===== In the Limousin =====
In the Limousin, demand for cavalry horses differed from the preferences of stud keepers, who favored the Thoroughbred. The introduction of horse races in Pompadour from 1820 encouraged renewed breeding activity in the region. Anglo-Arab-type crosses were made with the Limousin horse, a taller and more substantial breed than the Navarre horse, also influenced by Spanish blood. Over time, the Pompadour stud farm reduced its number of Limousin horses in favor of the Anglo-Arab, while local breeders increasingly crossed with the Thoroughbred. Anglo-Arabs from the Southwest remain lighter in build than those of Limousin origin, which tend to be taller and more robust. Nivernais and Norman mares were also used in Anglo-Arab breeding in the region.

===== Codification and establishment =====
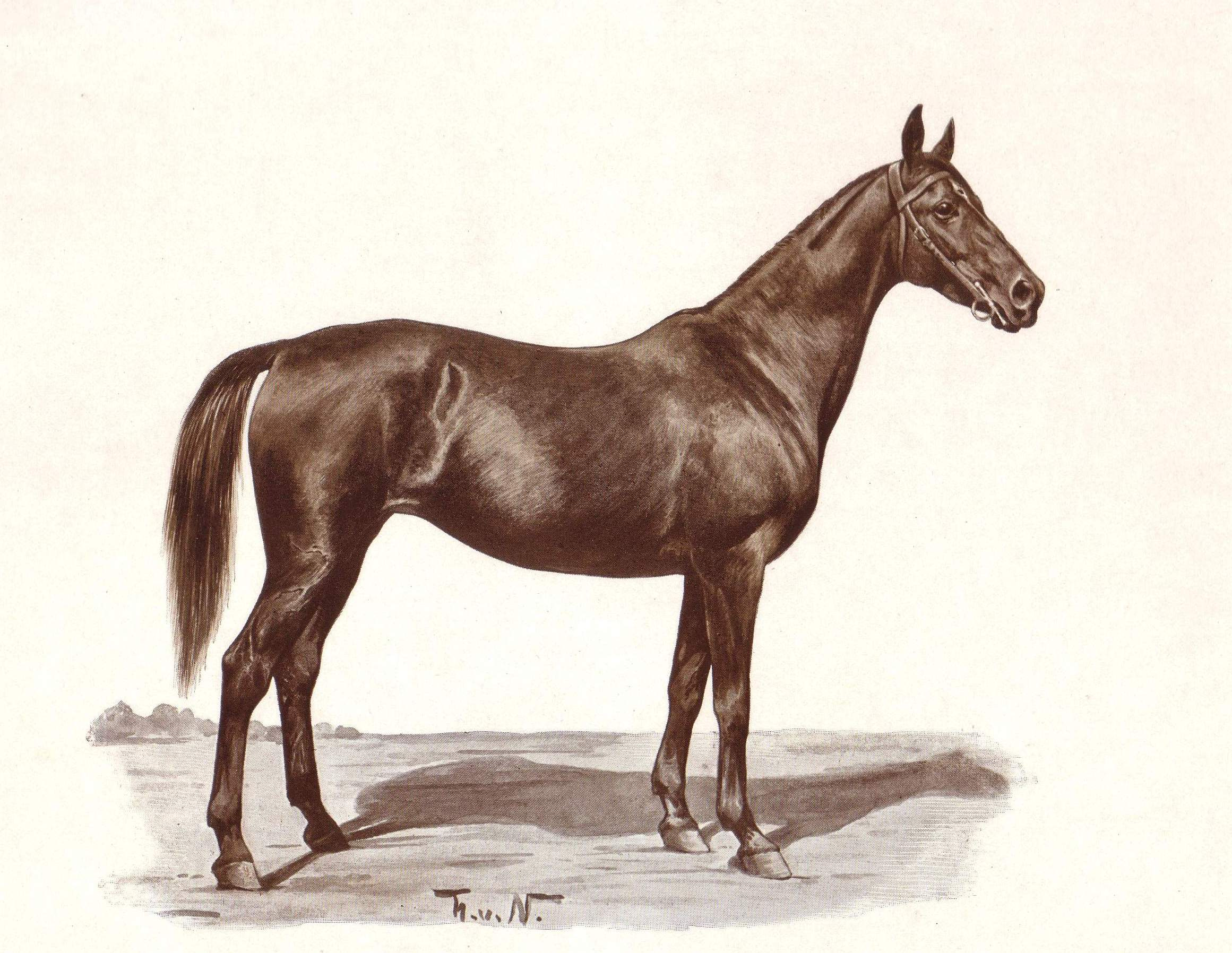
Belle de Jour, an Anglo-Arabian mare born in 1892

In 1833, the French studbook for the Anglo-Arab was established to register Thoroughbreds, Arabians, and Anglo-Arabs. A decree in 1861 defined an Anglo-Arab as a horse sired by an Arabian. The law of May 29, 1874, introduced financial incentives for the breed and outlined a selection program for racing based on performance, similar to the criteria used for Thoroughbreds by the Jockey Club. This legislation contributed to making the Limousin one of the principal production regions.

From 1880, a minimum of 25% Arabian blood was required for a horse to be recognized as an Anglo-Arab. A decree of March 15, 1893, applied this requirement to stallions participating in races reserved for the breed, and it was extended to all breeding stock on January 30, 1894. The stallion Prisme, introduced to the national studs in 1894, played a significant role in consolidating the breed’s characteristics and sired nearly 58 stallions.

=== 20th century ===
Despite the two World Wars, the Anglo-Arab increased in importance in France from the early 20th century until the 1980s–1990s. Since the early 21st century, breeding has declined domestically but has expanded in other countries.

==== Sporting reorientation ====
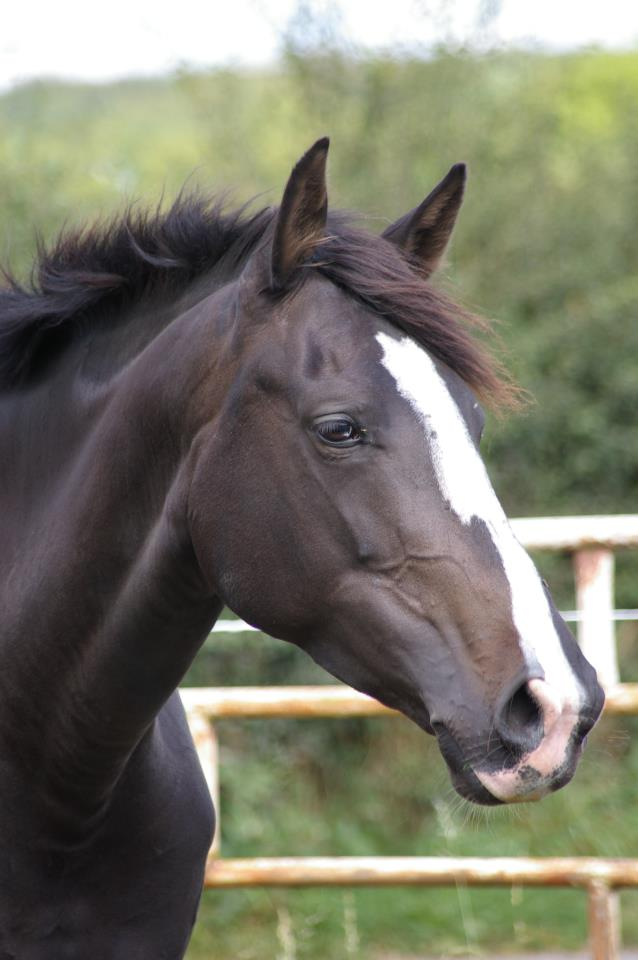
Soirée de Mels, Anglo-Arab broodmare (34.2%) at the Mels stud farm, Lamagdelaine, France

Initially popular as a cavalry remount, the Anglo-Arab was later bred as a versatile riding horse and became the first French breed specifically intended for equestrian sports, a direction that became evident in the second half of the 20th century. The National Studs ended purchases and breeding for military remounts, with Pompadour covering 1,409 mares with Arabian or Anglo-Arab stallions in 1943, compared to 158 in 1950. During the same period, half of the national stallions and eight-ninths of the military remount mares were retired from service.

Before the development of the Selle Français, the Anglo-Arab was considered the leading French sport horse. Faster than the various half-breds in the country and more substantial than the Arabian, it achieved particular success in postwar show jumping. The typical Anglo-Arab of this period was relatively small but possessed strong jumping ability. (Note: The term coup de saut refers to the aptitude for show jumping.) Some stallions of the era, such as Séducteur (born 1940 in Creuse), Nithard (born 1948 at the Pompadour stud in Corrèze), Zéphir (born 1950 in Sagnat), and Noroit (born 1957 in Pompadour), produced multiple international winners.

From 1940 to 1946, admission rules to the Anglo-Arab studbook were relaxed due to wartime losses. In 1942, it was opened to horses born from two Anglo-Arab parents or from a cross between an Arabian and a Thoroughbred. In 1958, breeding regulations were revised to require at least 25% Thoroughbred or Arabian blood for registration. Horses with less than 25% Arabian blood were transferred to the Selle Français studbook, leading to a decline in Anglo-Arab numbers in favor of the Selle Français. The policy was later amended, designating mares with less than 25% blood from either parent breed as “Anglo-Arab factors.” Offspring from these mares were eligible for Anglo-Arab registration if they met the 25% threshold from one of the two breeds.

==== From the 1970s to the 1990s ====
In the 1970s, the Anglo-Arab achieved success in both steeplechase racing and show jumping, and was later increasingly directed toward eventing. During the 1970s and 1980s, buyers tended to prefer larger horses, often from the Limousin, over the smaller types from the Midi, Bigorre, and Pau regions. Dr. Jacques Sevestre opposed this preference, noting the lack of correlation between size and athletic performance and the higher incidence of accidents in larger, heavier horses. In 1976, the French Anglo-Arab was recognized as a breed by the World Arabian Horse Organization (WAHO), in part through the efforts of Pierre Pechdo, which clarified the status of certain Arabian sires of previously uncertain origin. Pechdo also helped unite breeders from the Limousin and the Midi within the National Federation of Anglo-Arab Breeders, which held its first annual event at Pompadour in 1979. By 1983, the breed had 256 stallions and 1,521 mares in production. The French studbook was partially reopened to outside bloodlines on September 1, 1990, and a studbook was established in Uruguay in 1992.

=== 21st century ===
The Anglo-Arab breed in France has experienced a sustained decline in recent decades, marked by reduced visibility in international equestrian sports and a significant decrease in births. Between 1976 and 2008, the number of foals born in France fell by 50%, and the number of breeding farms decreased by half between 2001 and 2011. Contributing factors include reduced state support through the National Studs, limited financial resources among breeders—often operating small-scale facilities—lower representation in high-level competitions compared to the Selle Français, a shortage of elite professional riders in the breed’s traditional stronghold in the Southwest, and the use of Anglo-Arab mares for crossbreeding in other sport horse lines. The ongoing reduction in births has further limited the availability of high-quality horses. Internal tensions have also been reported within the National Association of Anglo-Arab Breeders and Owners (ANAA).

Efforts are underway among Anglo-Arab breeding countries to address the breed’s perceived image deficit, linked to the classification by the World Breeding Federation for Sport Horses (WBFSH) of horses bred outside France as “other breeds.” Despite these initiatives, declining interest in the breed has significantly impacted its traditional stronghold around Arnac-Pompadour, historically a center for the production of elite sport horses.

== Characteristics ==
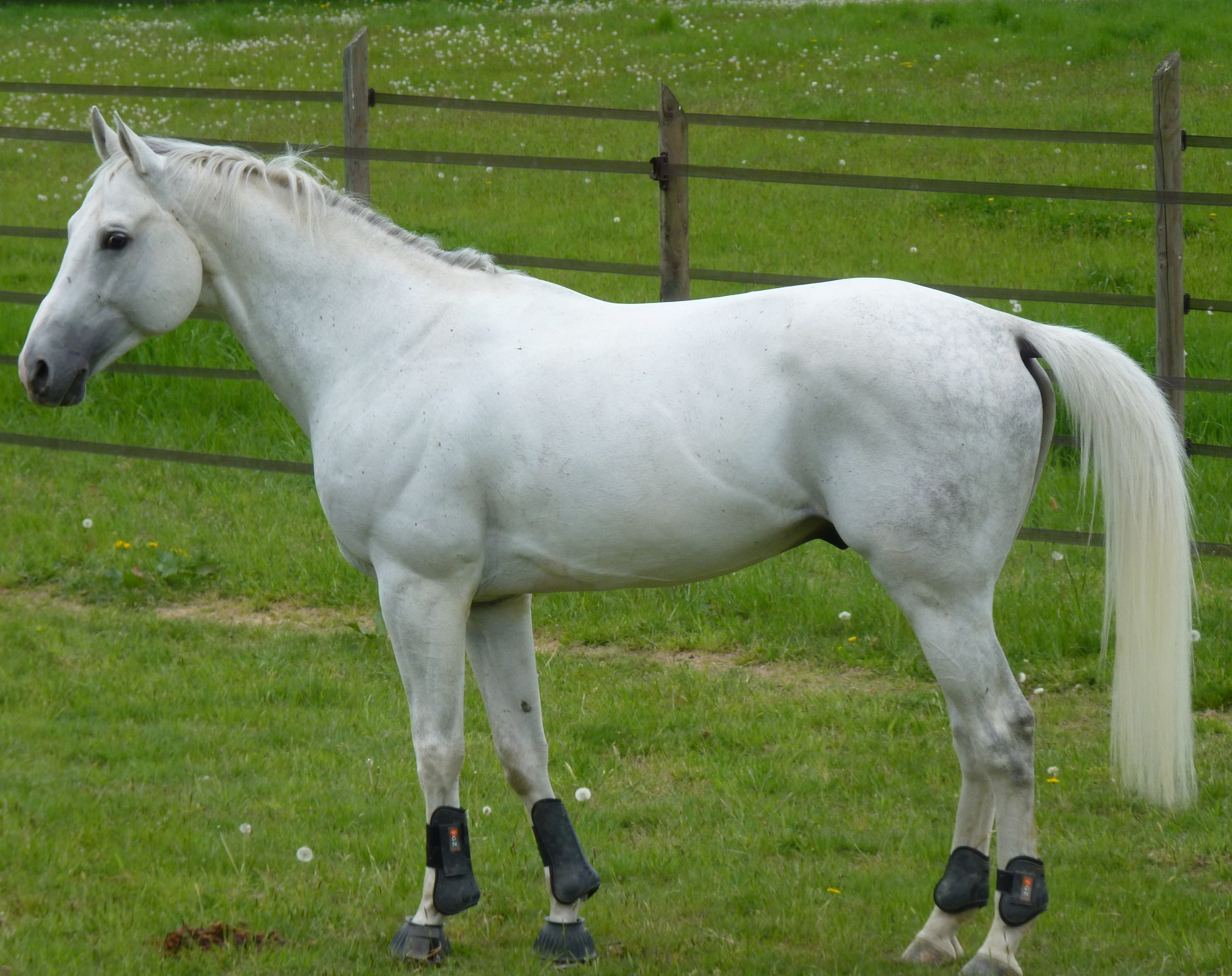
Gray Anglo-Arabian stallion

French Anglo-Arab breeding is divided into two main orientations: the race-type Anglo and the sport-type Anglo. The Anglo-Arab is a versatile riding horse, known for its athleticism and harmonious build, traits inherited from its Thoroughbred and Arabian ancestry.

The Anglo-Arab is noted for its elegance, suppleness, movement, and balance. Its height has increased over time, with the current standard ranging from 1.58 m to 1.65 m at the withers, compared to an average of 1.45 m to 1.60 m in the 1970s.

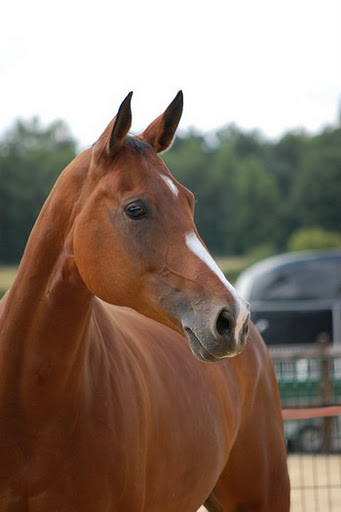
Head of the Anglo-Arabian mare Orphée du Lot, at 40.56%

The Anglo-Arab typically has a straight head profile, more similar to the Thoroughbred than the Arabian, though it can be slightly concave. It is characterized by a small, fine head, expressive eyes, a broad forehead, and mobile ears. Some individuals may display a slightly convex profile with a small muzzle and fine limbs, a trait attributed by Dr. Jacques Sevestre to the influence of Barb horse ancestry in the Thoroughbred.

The Anglo-Arab has a long neck, sometimes slightly arched, with prominent and extended withers. The chest is broad and deep, with a more open forechest than the Thoroughbred. The shoulder is long and moderately sloped, and the girth area is deep. The back is short to medium in length, straight, and strong, with a medium-length loin. The croup is long and level, and the hindquarters are well proportioned. The bone structure is generally light, with long, strong, and well-muscled limbs. The mane and tail are fine and silky. In the 1970s, individuals often displayed close hocks.

The breed exhibits all solid coat colors, with bay, dark bay, chestnut, and gray being the most common. Black is less frequent. White markings, including stockings, are common and permitted without restriction.

The Anglo-Arab is described as an intelligent, willing, courageous, and responsive horse, noted for its elegance and spirited nature. It has historically been considered sensitive and capricious, though selective breeding has reportedly reduced this trait. Compared to the Thoroughbred, it generally has a more manageable temperament but retains a refined character and strong personality, requiring an experienced rider with tact and a light hand. The Anglo-Arab is considered relatively easy to maintain and generally demonstrates greater physical resilience than either the Arabian or the Thoroughbred.

=== Muscle fibers; genetic diversity ===
Studies on the muscle fibers of the Anglo-Arab have shown specific physiological characteristics. One study found that successful flat racehorses of the breed had, on average, 6% more fast myosin in the gluteal muscles than less successful horses. Another study on endurance-trained horses of various breeds reported that, after training, Anglo-Arabs exhibited a significant increase in oxidative type IIB muscle fibers, whereas Arabians and Andalusians showed increases in type I and IIA fibers instead. Research also indicates that French Anglo-Arabs have low genetic diversity. The high proportion of fast myosin appears to be a genetically determined trait with low variability, likely due to strong selection before the breed’s creation. A study on French saddle horse breeds found that Anglo-Arabs born between 1989 and 1992 had an inbreeding coefficient of 1.17%, increasing by 0.029% between 1974 and 1992, alongside low heterozygosity. These figures are attributed to the partial openness of the studbook and the breed’s composite origins. The Anglo-Arab is slightly more inbred than the Selle Français, as fewer breeds are permitted for crossbreeding.

=== Selection ===
Anglo-Arabian brand

Notable Anglo-Arabs in French and international breeding include Dionysos II, Fol Avril, and Inschallah ex Josselin. Uncertainty regarding the breed’s selection program has been cited as a factor in the decline of its population.

In France, the Anglo-Arab breed is classified using several terms and designations that correspond to the percentage of Arabian blood in the horse. The main categories are Anglo-Arabs (AA), complementary Anglo-Arabs (AC), crossbred Anglo-Arabs (AACR), and half-blood Anglo-Arabs (DSAA). For AA and AC, stars placed alongside the breed’s acronym (for example, AA) indicate that the horse descends exclusively from Thoroughbred and Arabian ancestors. Beyond these classifications, the breed is organized into two primary selection lines: one oriented toward sport horses and the other toward racehorses. Selection criteria for sport horses have traditionally emphasized conformation and lineage, while racehorses have been primarily bred for performance. In response to the decline in Anglo-Arab numbers in France, a recovery plan implemented in 2009 introduced measures to encourage purebred matings.

==== Anglo-Arab ====
True Anglo-Arabs (AA) are defined as having at least 25% Arabian blood. Within this classification, “50% Anglo-Arabs” have at least 50% Arabian blood, typically resulting from a cross between a Thoroughbred and a Purebred Arabian, while “25% Anglo-Arabs” have between 25% and 50% Arabian blood, such as from crossing a 50% Anglo-Arab with a Thoroughbred.

These classifications, though seldom used in equestrian sports, are significant in racing. In general, a lower proportion of Arabian blood, and thus a higher proportion of Thoroughbred blood, is associated with greater speed. Separate flat races are held for “50% Anglo-Arabs” (more than 37.5% Arabian blood) and “25% Anglo-Arabs” (25% to 37.5% Arabian blood). Complementary Anglo-Arabs, with less than 25% Arabian blood, traditionally competed alongside other French Chaser (AQPS) horses. A new category has been established for horses with between 12.5% and 25% Arabian blood.

==== Complementary Anglo-Arab ====
Anglo-Arabs with less than 25% Arabian blood are referred to as complementary Anglo-Arabs (AC). Those with less than 12.5% Arabian blood also receive the designation French Chaser (AQPS). Under certain conditions, these horses are classified solely as AQPS, which has been recognized as a separate breed with its own studbook since 2005.

==== Crossbred Anglo-Arab ====
Since January 2004, horses closely related to Anglo-Arabs have been classified as crossbred Anglo-Arabs (AACR). These horses are not eligible for entry into the French Anglo-Arab studbook but must have at least 12.5% Arabian blood and, except in specific cases, at least three-quarters of their ancestry from Thoroughbreds, Arabians, or Anglo-Arabs. Since 2009, the AACR register has also included offspring with at least 12.5% Arabian blood resulting from the breeding of an Anglo-Arab, AQPS, or AACR mare with a stallion approved for producing AACRs.

==== Half-blood Anglo-Arab ====
Anglo-Arabs with a limited proportion (maximum 1/16) of breeds other than Thoroughbred or Arabian in their ancestry are classified as “half-blood Anglo-Arabs” and have a separate registry. Since 2011, foals in this category must have at least 25% Arabian blood, include at least one Thoroughbred ancestor, be ineligible for the Anglo-Arab studbook, and result from a cross between an Anglo-Arab, Thoroughbred, AQPS, Arabian, or half-blood Anglo-Arab and a half-blood Anglo-Arab breeding horse. Regulations approved on April 5, 2013, extended eligibility to Anglo-Arabs from crosses with Shagyas or other sport horse breeds.

== Use ==
The Anglo-Arab is a versatile horse breed used in various equestrian disciplines. Selective breeding has also produced lines suited to horse racing, and the breed is frequently used for crossbreeding. The Anglo-Arab is primarily a sport horse, valued for its jumping ability, speed, elegance, and stamina, making it suitable for various disciplines.

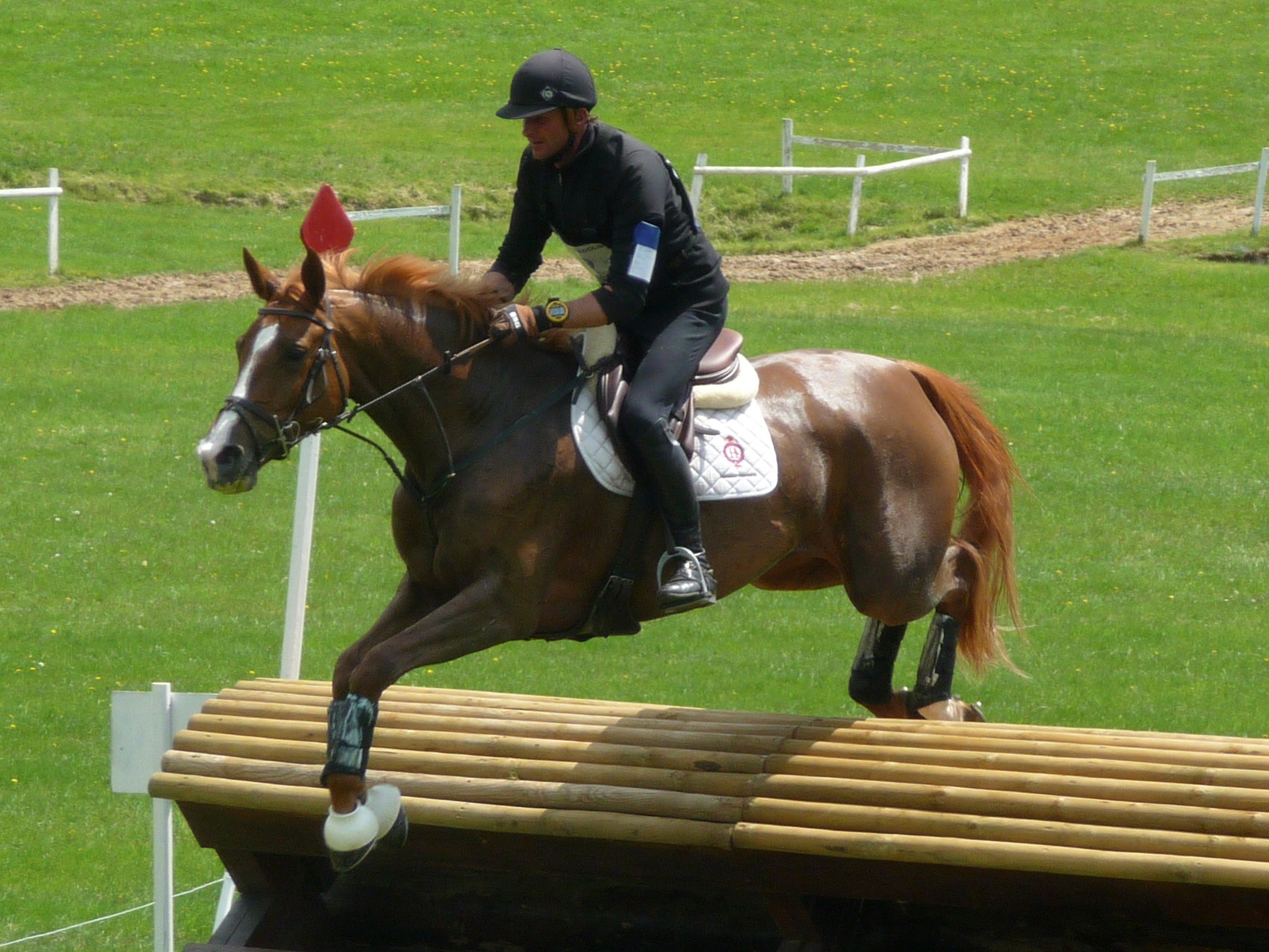
An Anglo-Arabian performing during an eventing competition

Eventing is considered the breed's principal discipline, with its speed, endurance, and responsiveness contributing to performance at the highest levels of competition. The Anglo-Arab is also valued for its agility and carefulness over jumps, traits that offset its comparatively limited strength and occasionally sensitive temperament. In 2013, the Anglo-Arab studbook ranked fifteenth worldwide among breeds in eventing. Crossbred Anglo-Arabs are generally preferred in eventing over purebred Anglo-Arabs, due to the height of obstacles and the technical demands of the cross-country phase, for which available purebred bloodlines are considered less favorable. Professional event riders often recommend crossbreeding to maintain competitive performance, as purebred Anglo-Arabs may have limitations in strength and movement.

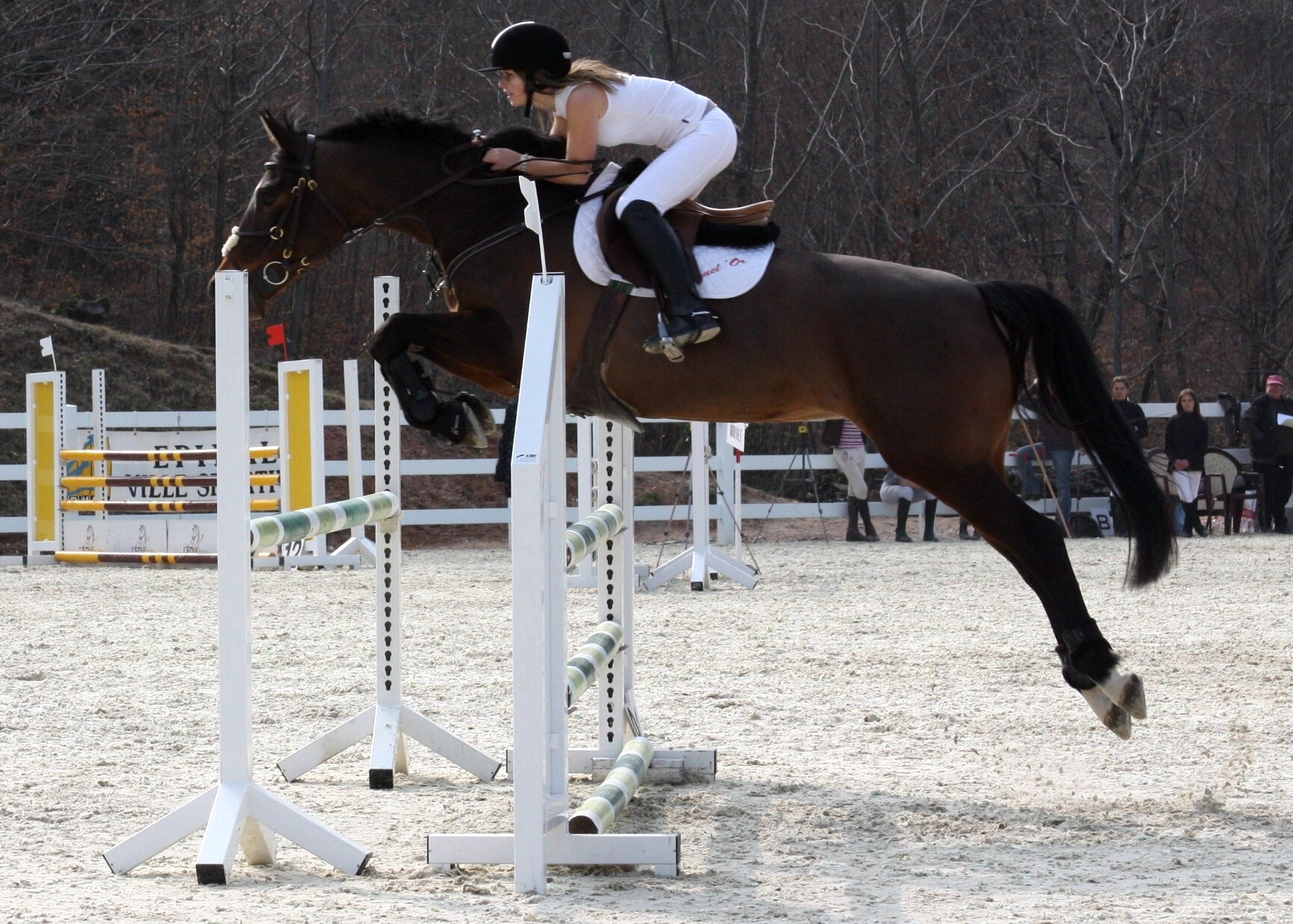
Anglo-Arabian mare (45.78%) jumping

The Anglo-Arab has been valued for its jumping ability in show jumping. Several notable Anglo-Arabs have competed at the international level. In contemporary show jumping, the Selle Français is often favored over the Anglo-Arab, as the latter is generally considered less suited to the height of the obstacles.

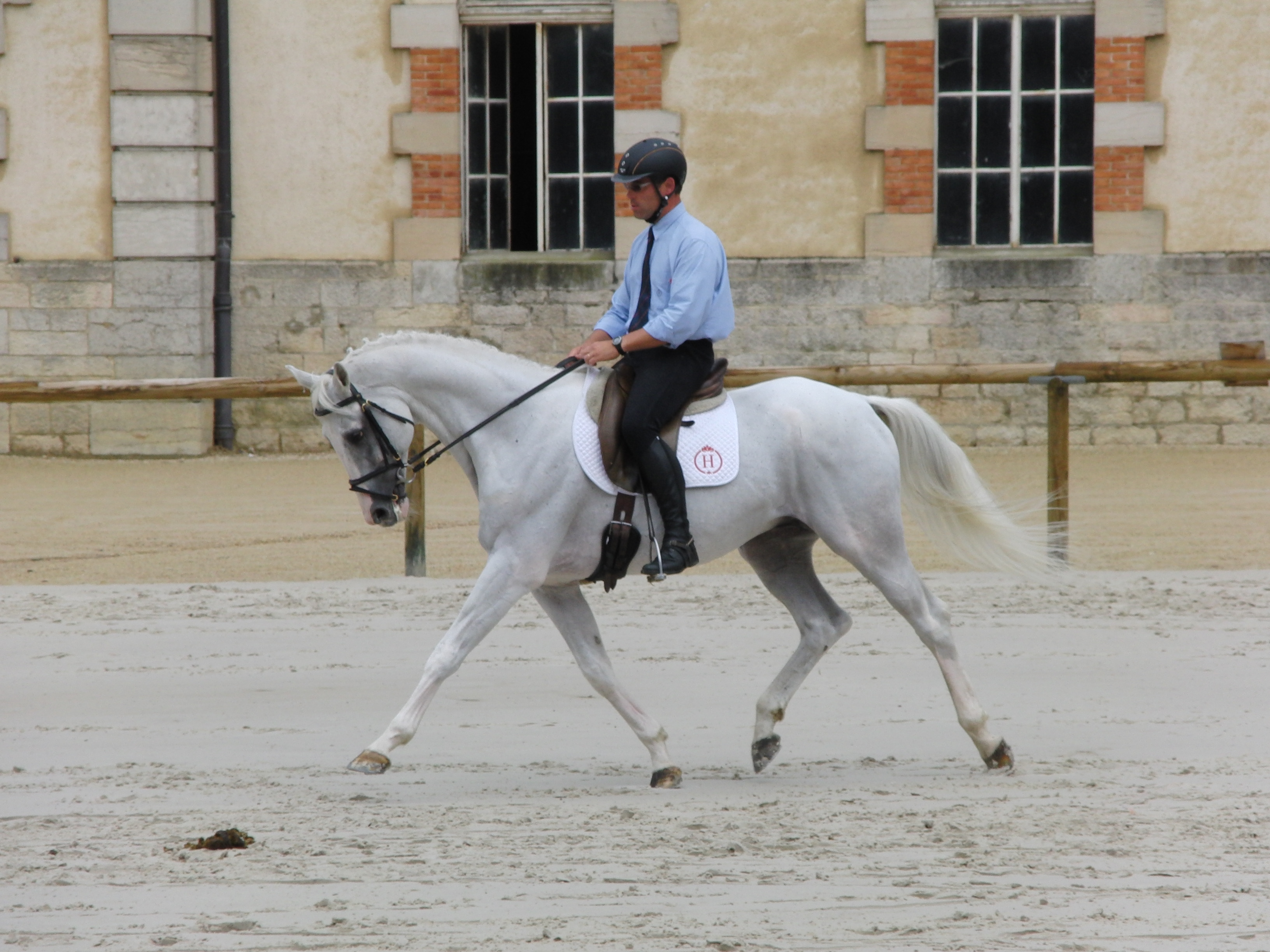
An Anglo-Arabian working on dressage

The Anglo-Arab is also present in dressage competitions, though less represented at the highest level, as it is generally considered less competitive than larger northern breeds with more expressive gaits.

The Anglo-Arab is suited to endurance riding, with preference generally given to individuals with a high percentage of Arabian blood.

Some also participate in combined driving competitions in France, notably with Frédéric Bousquet, who appreciates their qualities of “submission, movement, and gaits.”

A branch of Anglo-Arab breeding is dedicated to horse racing, in which the breed competes in both flat and steeplechase events. In southwestern France, racecourses such as Pau, Tarbes, and Pompadour host events reserved for the breed. Anglo-Arabs also compete against other breeds in steeplechasing. French Anglo-Arab races are classified into two categories: anglos de complément, for those with 12.5% to 37.5% Thoroughbred blood, and anglos, with more than 37.5%. (Note: Horses with less than 12.5% Arabian blood are classified as AQPS.) These races have been exported to other countries, particularly in the Mediterranean region, including Morocco since 1995. In contrast to the sport horse sector, the population of Anglo-Arab racehorses in France has remained relatively stable, with an estimated 400 individuals in early 2013.

The Anglo-Arab is frequently used for crossbreeding with other sport horse breeds and has played a significant role in the development of the Selle Français. It is recognized by several European studbooks as a breed improver, valued for its elegance, responsiveness, and contribution of bloodlines that enhance vitality. In France, the number of Anglo-Arab stallions used for crossbreeding has declined, while the number of mares crossed with Selle Français has increased, a trend attributed to the higher competition presence and performance of horses out of Anglo-Arab dams compared to those out of Anglo-Arab sires.

The Anglo-Arab is considered by its breed association to be suitable for trail riding and leisure riding, particularly for riders seeking a refined horse. Its popularity in this role is limited, partly due to its reputation for having a temperamental disposition. Riding schools often avoid using it for beginner instruction, and retraining individuals from racing can be challenging for novice riders. However, equestrian professionals note that the breed is well suited to experienced riders with good control of their aids.

== Breeding distribution ==
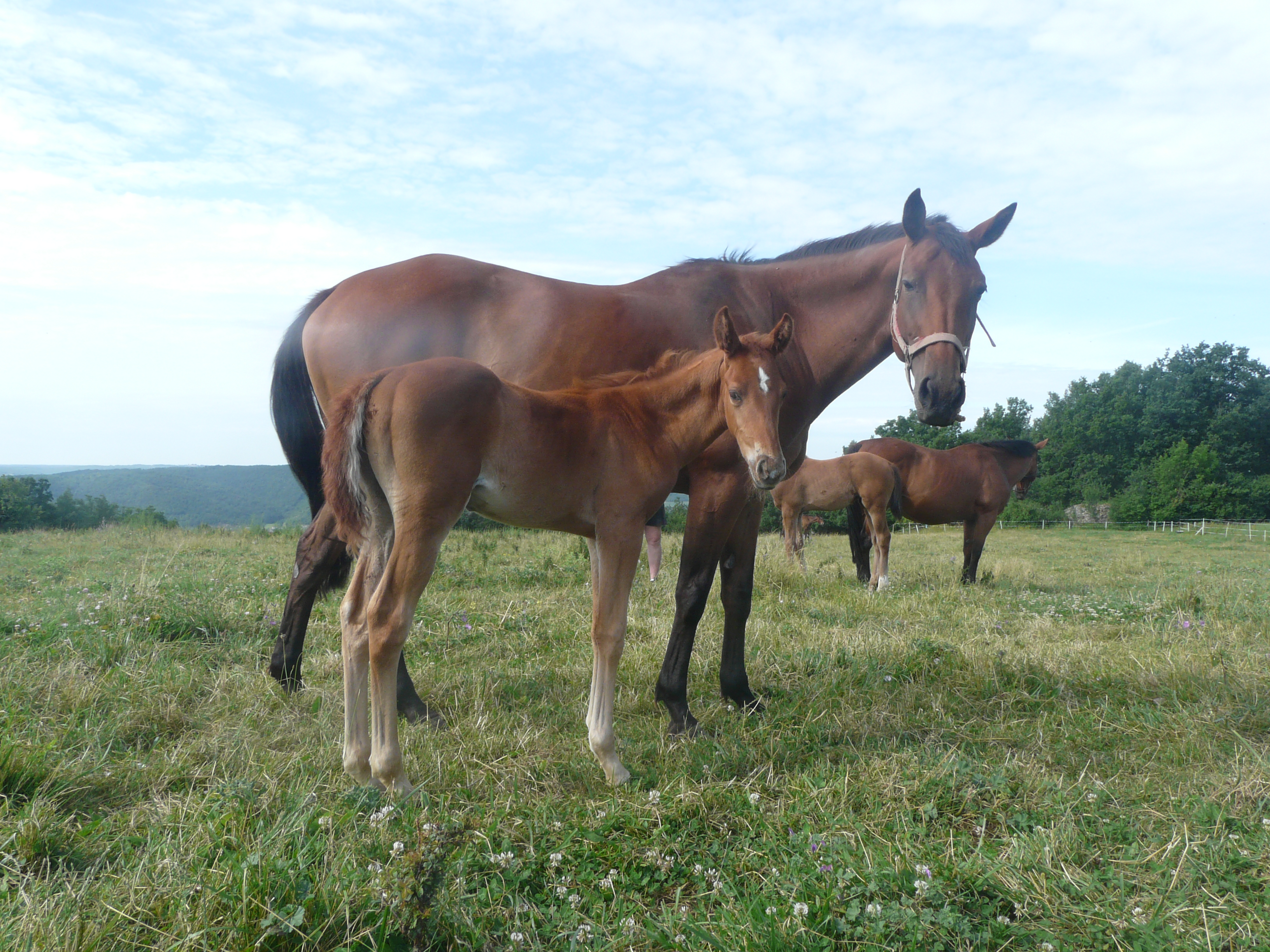
Anglo-Arabian broodmare and her foal.

In France, the National Association of Anglo-Arab Breeders and Owners (ANAA), approved by the Ministry of Agriculture, oversees the coordination of breeders, owners, and users, manages studbook regulations, and promotes the breed. Breeding competitions take place in September in Fontainebleau, Saumur, Uzès, and Pompadour, while international breed meetings are held in October at the Tarbes stud farm and the nearby Laloubère racecourse, as well as at the Mondial du Lion.

Traditional breeding areas are located in southwestern France, particularly in Aquitaine, Limousin, and Midi-Pyrénées, near the studs of Pau, Saintes, Tarbes, Villeneuve-sur-Lot, Aurillac, Rodez, Uzès, and Pompadour. Pompadour has served as a center for the breed for two centuries, maintaining a national broodmare band for Arabian and Anglo-Arab breeding. The breed is also present in the jurisdictions of Compiègne, Angers, Le Pin, and in Corsica, with Anglo-Arab stallions found in all jurisdictions. Some breeding operations, such as Dumont-Saint-Priest, have long histories, with the latter acquiring its first mares in 1855 and specializing in Limousin-type Anglo-Arabs. The Limousin region primarily produces horses for equestrian sports, particularly show jumping, while the Midi focuses on racing Anglo-Arabs. The area around Laloubère, near Tarbes, is locally referred to as “Anglo-Arabia.”

In 2008, 80% of Anglo-Arab broodmares were bred within the breed. In 2009, 1,111 breeders produced Anglo-Arabs.

In 2008, 993 Anglo-Arabs were born, representing 7% of all French saddle horse births. In 2009, 2,232 Anglo-Arab mares were covered, including 1,481 bred within the breed, and 110 Anglo-Arab stallions were active. The use of Anglo-Arab broodmares for crossbreeding with other breeds has been increasing.

Year	2000	2005	2006	2007	2008	2009	2010	2011	2012	2013
Number of births in France	1,484	1,559	1,235	1,114	1,003	943	864	693	656	520

In 1993, the French census submitted to the FAO recorded at least 6,815 Anglo-Arabs in the country.

== See also ==
- List of French horse breeds
- Anglo-Arabian
- Eventing
