= Auvergne horse =

Breed of horse

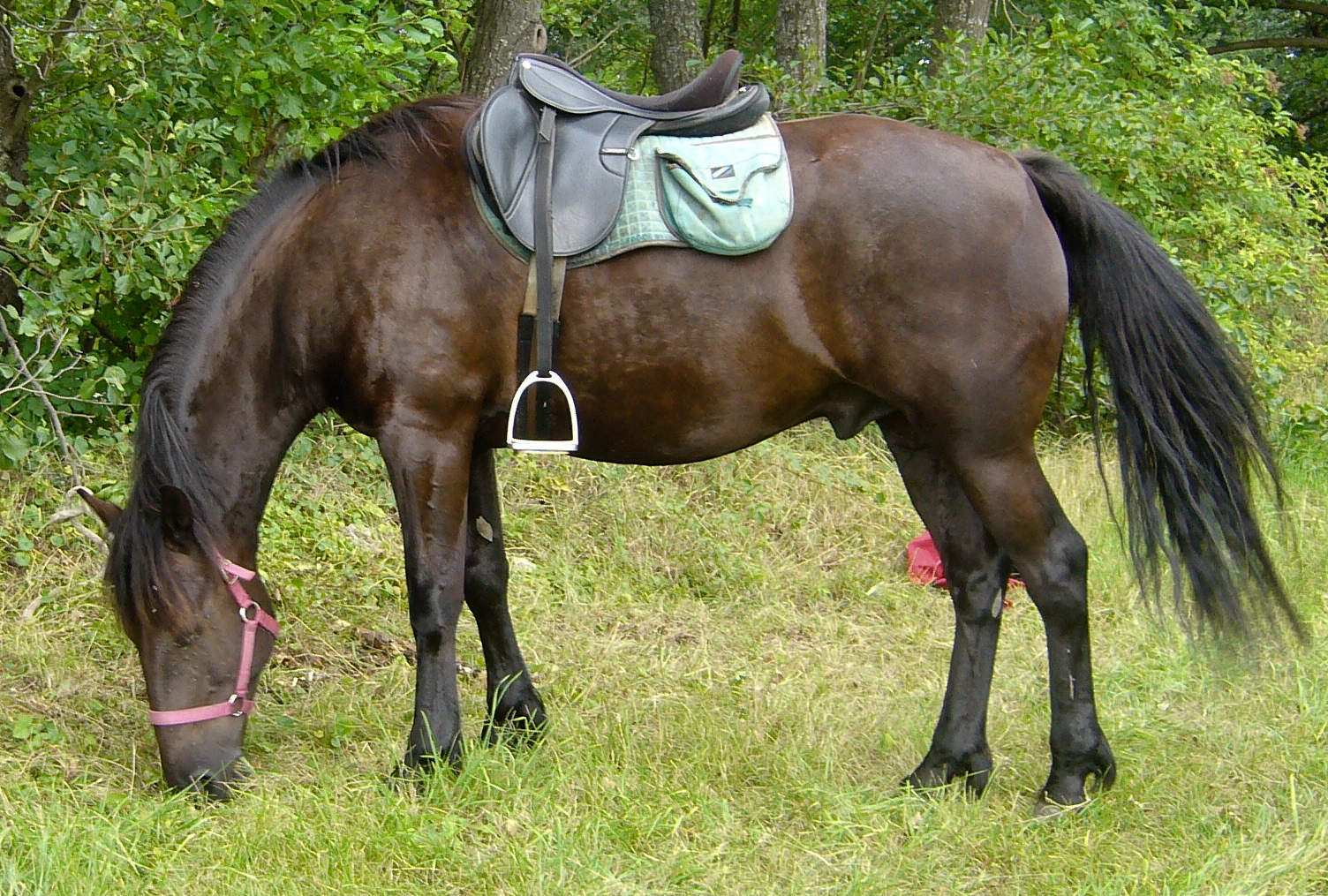

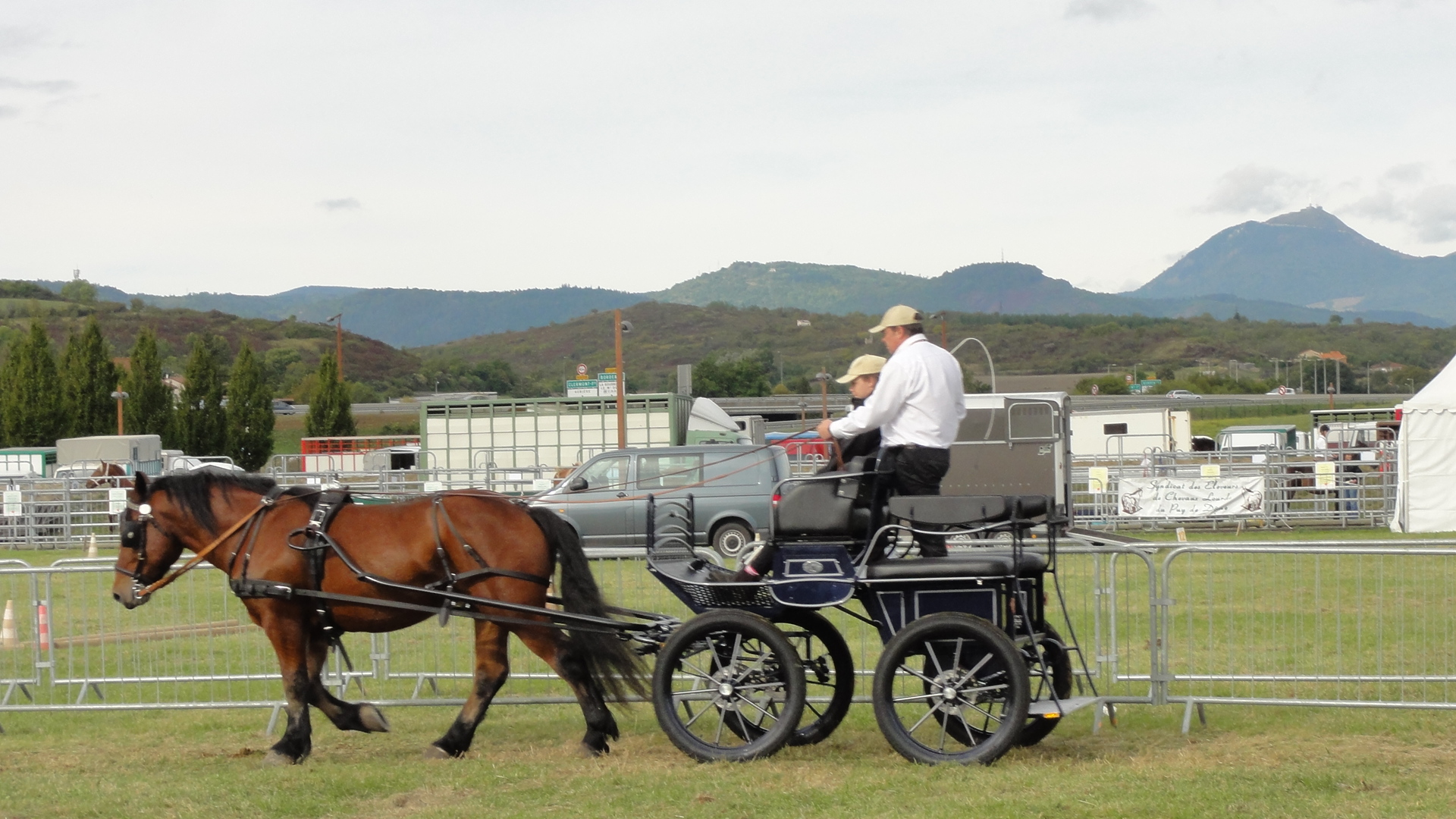
- Other names: Cheval d'Auvergne (French)
- Country of origin: Auvergne region of France

Breed standards
- Association Nationale du Cheval de Race Auvergne

The Auvergne horse (French cheval d'Auvergne) is a breed of light draft horse from the Auvergne region of south central France. It stands 143 to 147 centimetres (14.0 to 14.2 hands) at the withers, and weighs 450–650 kilograms (990–1,430 lb). Coat colours are bay or seal brown. It is used mainly for trekking. It was recognised as a breed by the Haras Nationaux, the French association of horse breeders in December 2012. The standard is published by a breeders' association, the Association Nationale du Cheval de Race Auvergne.

This breed has been crossbred several times throughout its history, with several distinct breeds sharing the name "Auvergne horse". A small riding horse known as the "half-blood of Auvergne" was primarily ridden by the cavalry at the beginning of the 19th century, but has since disappeared. Other work horses of Auvergne were used as a means of transportation before the advent of modern roads. The work horse was crossbred to become a light draught horse and subsequent ancestor of the modern Auvergne horse. It was used for varying field work by the inhabitants of the region.

As with most of Europe's draught breeds, the Auvergne almost disappeared with the spread of mechanized transportation in the 1960s and 70s. It was crossed with other draught horses, such as the Comtois horse, and was used as a source of horsemeat. In 1994, an association was created to save the last remaining animals and to fight for the recognition of the breed in France. Since then, several actions have been levied to promote the continued existence of the Auvergne horse. However, the breed is still extremely rare outside of Auvergne. 200 were represented in a census at the beginning of the 21st century.

== Characteristics ==
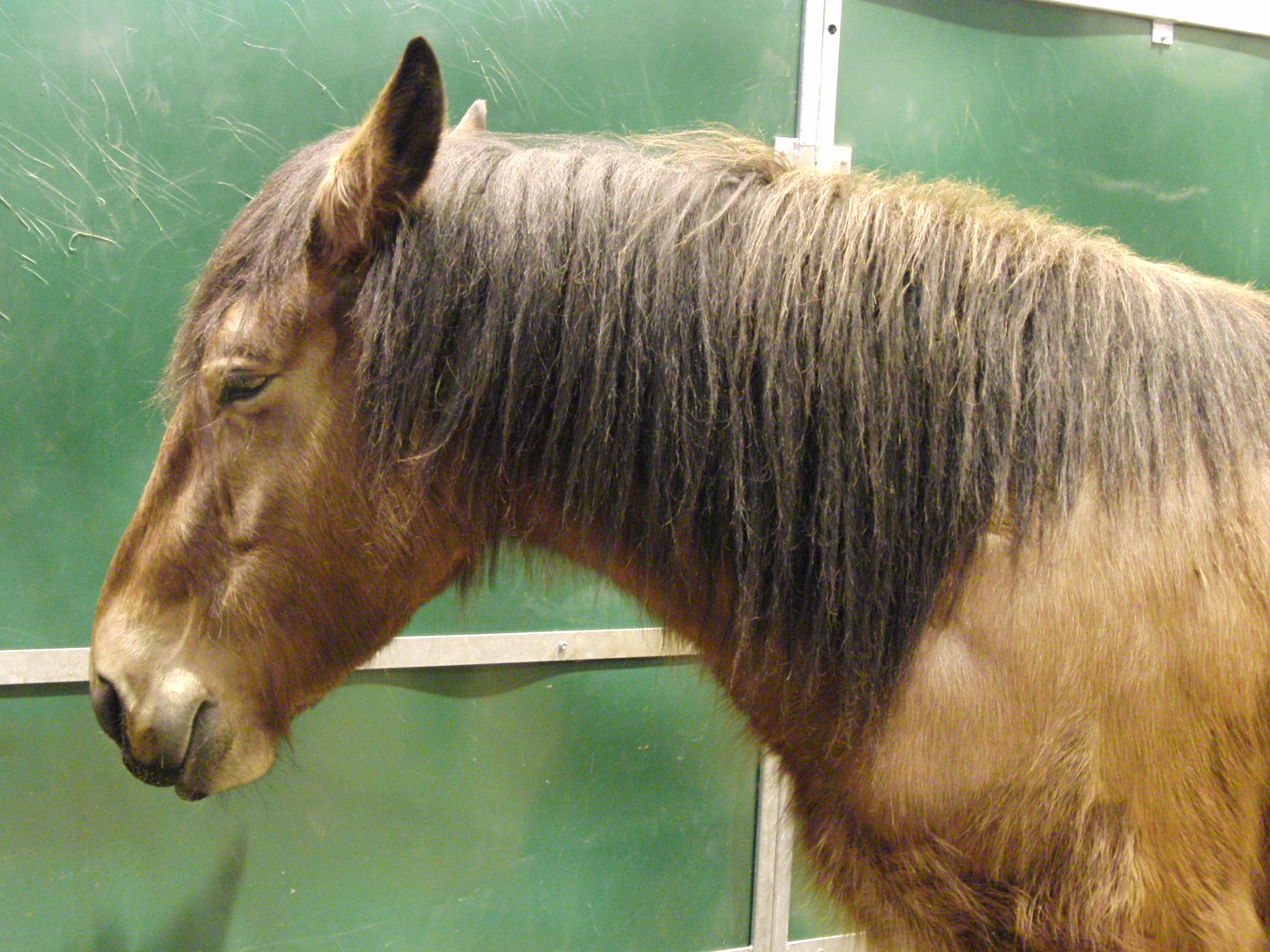
An Auvergne horse at the International Agriculture Exhibition 2012, Paris, France

The Auvergne horse is a compact horse with light features of postier type, close to a cavalry horse and similar to the Comtois horse but thinner. It stands at 1.43 to 1.57 metres (4 ft 8 in to 5 ft 2 in) at the withers and weighs between 450 and 650 kilograms (990 and 1,430 lb) with an average of about 500 kilograms (1,100 lb). The head is very expressive, rather small, short with a square nose, nostrils well open, a straight or slightly concave muzzle, eyes bright and expressive and almond-shaped highlighted by prominent eyebrows, a broad forehead, short and mobile ears. Light heads are well-regarded.

The neck is short and slightly round, generally arched, the shoulder rather straight and strong. The withers are quite prominent and tends to be noyé, the point of shoulder is open, the chest goes down and the flanks are rounded. The back is short, and wide, the loins short, powerful and well attached. The Croup is double, slightly tilted but not bent.

The legs fine enough for a cavalry horse, but have short cannons, with slender hocks and often a little closed, ending with round feet well proportioned in relation to the weight of the horse. Leg feathering is normally abundant but sometimes there may be little. The mane is very thick, slightly wavy, and can be single or double, the tail is also very thick and rather long.

The Aubergne horse has a coat of fine hair which can be bay in all possible variants, including Seal brown. Black points are well marked and can be traced high along the legs. Significant white markings, such as high stockings, are prohibited. This feature is one of the criteria for the recognition of these animals. The Association intends to maintain this and to reject all stallions with white markings for breeding. "Fox nose" coloration is highly regarded.

The Auvergne horse is reputed to have good weight-carrying ability, docile and energetic, lively and generous, and sure-footed. It is a sociable horse, rustic, and multi-purpose. Evelyn Carpentier, breeder of these animals in La Ferme Équestre des Roches in Rochefort-Montagne, said that "it has the character of Auvergne. It does what it wants, but it is very gentle...". It costs little in production and breeding. According to Muriel Ronez, permanent association staff, "the idea is not to make a sports horse but rather [a horse for] equestrian tourism, harness, and small agricultural work".

=== Selection ===
The Auvergne horse was bred extensively in the Massif Central where it played a comparable role to the Pyrenean Pottok. It is present in Vivarais and the Plateau de Millevaches. The association is searching for animals that have escaped the inventory to increase the numbers, find other strains, and increase the genetic diversity. For this purpose, horses, ideally older than three years, are registered in an initial title following an evaluation grid. The association wants to demonstrate the vitality of the livestock and to increase the numbers for breeding.

== History ==
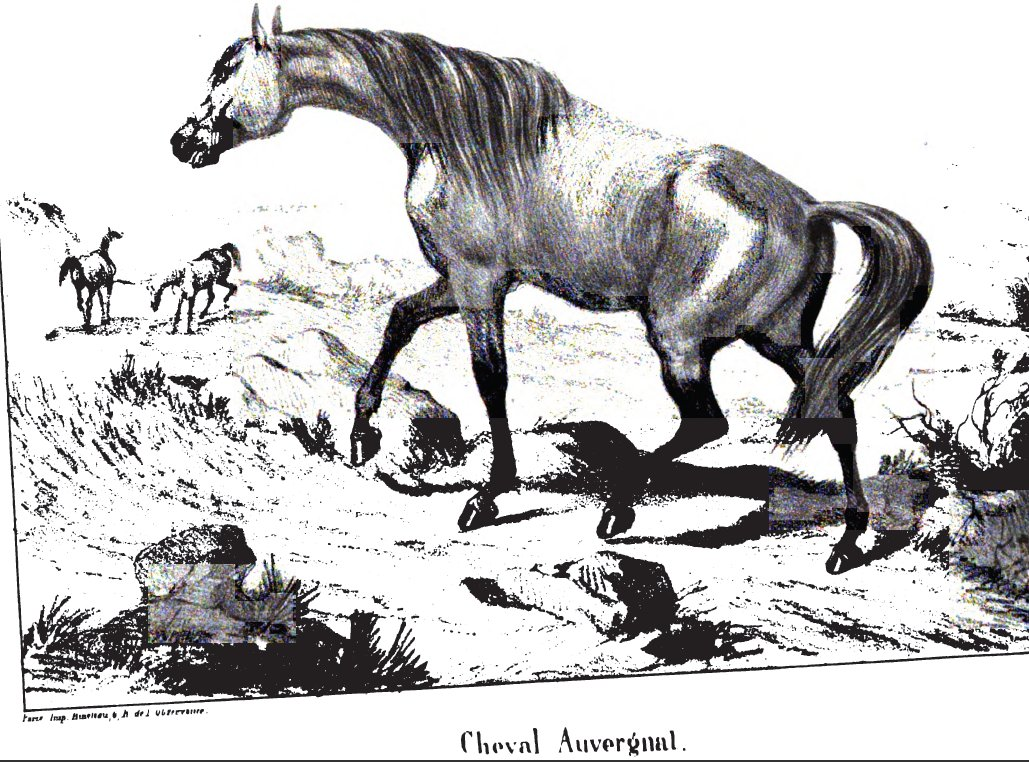
An engraving of an Auvergne horse in 1848

As with other local draught horses, the use of the Auvergne horse has declined with the rise of mechanized travel. Defining the horse is difficult in the absence of recent scientific publications. Documents mentioning the "cheval d'Auvergne" actually speak of many different breeds which have rarely, or never, been recognized as an independent breed throughout their history.

No scientific studies exist concerning the origin of the Auvergne horse, but there are several theories:

- According to the Association of the Auvergne Breed, the breed is the distant descendant of the oriental breeds abandoned by the Saracens on the plains of Vouillé circa 732. Their horses remained in the same area (the departments of Corrèze, of Creuse, and of Haute-Vienne) until the barons of the country took possession of them. The horses would presumably been the root of those which had spread over the course of the following centuries into all of Limousin, followed by Auvergne, to become the ancestors of the Limousin horse, a close relative of the Auvergne horse.
- According to Lætitia Bataille, a specialist in equine management in France, the Auvergne horse was the product of the ancient Navarrin horse's crossbreeding with the Thoroughbred.
- According to the inhabitants of the Auvergne region, the breed is native to the region, and lived there "depuis la nuit des temps" (since the dawn of time). According to their theory, it is descended from prehistoric animals who had simply wandered into the region.

There seems to have been two types of Auvergne horses throughout the region's history: the smaller horse, or "half-blood Auvergne horse", was a riding horse destined for the light cavalry; the communal, "all-purpose" horse was used by locals until the improvement of automobile roads, at which time it was crossbred again to better handle a wider range of agricultural duties.

=== To 17th century ===
If one believes the inhabitants of Auvergne, Vercingetorix used an "Auvergnat cob" for his battles. True or not, the Auvergne horse seems to have been popular in the Middle Ages. In 1577, the Duke of Bouillon mentioned, in a Classical French text, that he rode an animal from Auvergne in leaving Turenne: "I'm leaving Turenne, and I'm coming to sleep at M. de Beynac's home with Bousolles, Alagnac, La Vilatte, and Annal to whom I have given pages, Bouschant of Auvergne, all without any arms other than our swords, and all having this strong, bad horse; Bouschant had a little, rather good horse from Auvergne; my horse went with a large gate, not knowing how to turn and even less how to run ...."

The existence of the Auvergne horse is suggested in documents from the 17th century which describe a small, rustic, mountain horse of oriental build and rather closely related to oriental breeds. Under the rule of Henry IV, the "barbe auvergnat" was a prized mount for cavaliers and, according to tradition, the famous white horse of the king himself came from a farm in Barra, near Aurillac.

It was Louis XIV who, with the creation of the French National Breeding Farm during the 17th century, tried to better the horse in the hopes of using it in his cavalry. To breed the horse, he called upon stallions of Turkish and Barbary descent, and upon the Frisian and Dutch stallions. The cross-breeding however was largely unsuccessful, mostly because of poor breeding management.

=== 18th century ===
In a census of the Auvergne horse population by the administration of Stud farms in 1764 only 604 mares were estimated as likely to give birth to good foals in the region. This was very low and reflected the poor quality of the population of Auvergne horses at that time. The Auvergne horse long remained disreputable. As a result, at the end of the 18th century these animals were described as "with a large head, large ears and a little neck" and as "heavy, unhealthy and without nerves".

In 1788 2,660 foals were born in the Auvergne region and their sales value was reported at some 60,000 livres. After the suppression of the National Stud in 1790 the horses quickly regained their old features because of the disappearance of foreign Stallions which were stationed there. During the French Revolution General Houchard raised a regiment of light cavalry from Aurillac and, during the First Empire, the cavalry were mounted on Auvergne horses. At that time Auvergne produced many horses bred for economic use and sold them at four years old for saddling. Wars, however, resulted in the re-creation of the National Stud and the best horses disappeared.

=== 19th century ===
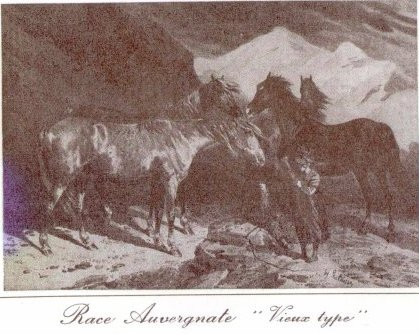
An engraving of Auvergne horses (1873)

Napoleon I appreciated the qualities of the Auvergne horse and he requisitioned them heavily for his Russian campaign. Following these huge requisitions, by 1815 the horse population was decimated and weakened. Local horse farmers resumed their activities but the horses were no longer uniform.

The method of raising Auvergne horses was frequently criticized. In Cantal the Auvergne gravid mare was worked until the tenth month of gestation and was not better fed in the winter. Five or six days after parturition she was sent with her foal to pasture where she often spent the night. Nursing of foals lasted five to six months. After weaning some of them were sold and exported to neighboring departments while others remained in pasture until November when the foals were returned to the stable. Their stabling lasted until April and foals were only let out to drink. In the first days of spring the foals were returned to the pasture to stay, night and day, until the month of November. At two years, the colts were castrated and all are saddled twelve months later. The horse population was more numerous in Cantal than in other departments of the old Auvergne.

In Puy-de-Dôme horses had the same conformation and the same qualities as in Cantal but were deemed to be "less fine and less numerous" although the farming system was the same. In Aveyron, Auvergne mares were crossed with stallions from Rodez and gave birth to a small horse (1.47 m) which formed the "country breed". In summer he lived in pastures where there was abundant food. In winter he returned to the stable "where he received any food, the waste from the feeding of cattle".

==== Historical types ====
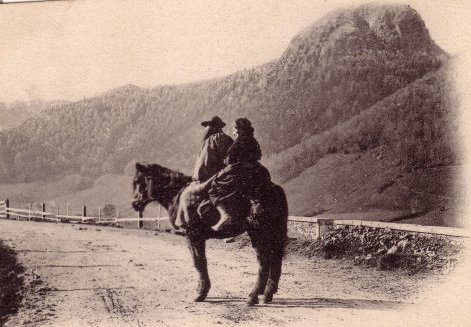
Auvergne people going to town on their horse (late 19th century)

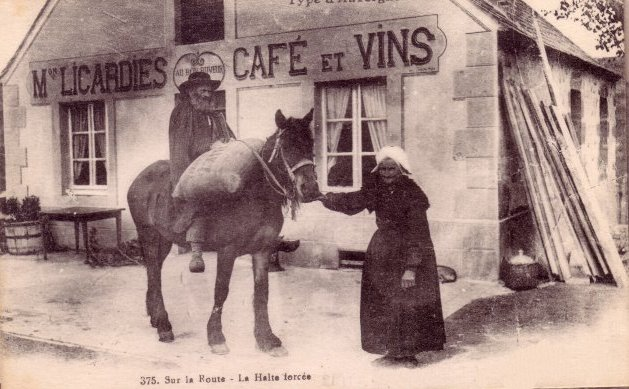
An old postcard showing two Auvergne people with a lightweight horse

A number of stud newspapers from the middle of the 19th century reported that "Auvergne produces three breeds (sub-species) of horse". One of them was a racehorse from the old breed crossed with Arabian and Thoroughbred stallions. The second breed, although endangered, is the old Auvergne horse. It had a lot of the characteristics of the Arabian, often having a coat of Speckled gray and has a lot of enthusiasm and heart. The third breed is that of the "communal horse" crossed with large horses and with Anglo-Norman stallions.

The light horse or "half-blood Auvergne" is a saddle mount for light cavalry. The communal "all-purpose" horse is used by local farmers. Following the improvement in paved roads it was able to do various agricultural jobs and serve farmers in all their activities.

===== The old Auvergne horse =====
The old Auvergne horse was, according to the naturalist Louis-Furcy Grognier "a weakened emanation of the Limousin breed, an immediate result of Oriental blood". André Sanson and Jean-Henri Magne also described the horse as close to the Limousin with "less elegance in the face: the Auvergne is less regular than the Limousin". The general impression is that of a horse "thin, strong, and solid if somewhat disjointed", "lacking in purity and elegance".

The horse was not tall, ranging from 1.43 to 1.47 metres (4 ft 8 in to 4 ft 10 in) according to Eugène Gayot, less than 1.47 m according to Alexandre Bernard Vallon,. and from 1.44 to 1.48 metres (4 ft 9 in to 4 ft 10 in) according to the Cardini dictionary. It increased from 1.48 to 1.50 metres (4 ft 10 in to 4 ft 11 in) in the late 19th century according to the Revue d'Auvergne. The head is fine, short, and expressive with hollows above the eyes, keen eyes, ears very straight and very mobile, and with wide nostrils. It seems stronger than the Limousin horse because it is smaller. The neckline is arched or reversed but rather short. The mane is abundant and fine. Eugene Gayot said that when the wind blows the mane and forelock of the horses, it gives them a disheveled and very strange look. The withers are high and good-looking, sharp-edged and often separated from the neck by a sharp line. The chest and body are narrow but the chest is deep, a condition for speed. The back and loins conform well, but the back can be long. The flanks are turned up or cordés. The hips are protruding and the haunch is sharp, short, angular and low - slightly avalée or en pupitre. The leg is fine and muscular with a wide and well articulated knee, smooth cannons and well detached tendons - almost as big as the bone. Members are spotless, dry and nervous, and free of defects but sometimes they have defects of plumb. The hock is hooked and closed but big enough, the pastern is short. The foot is small and well formed terminated by a very hard black hoof.

=== Half-Blood Auvergne ===
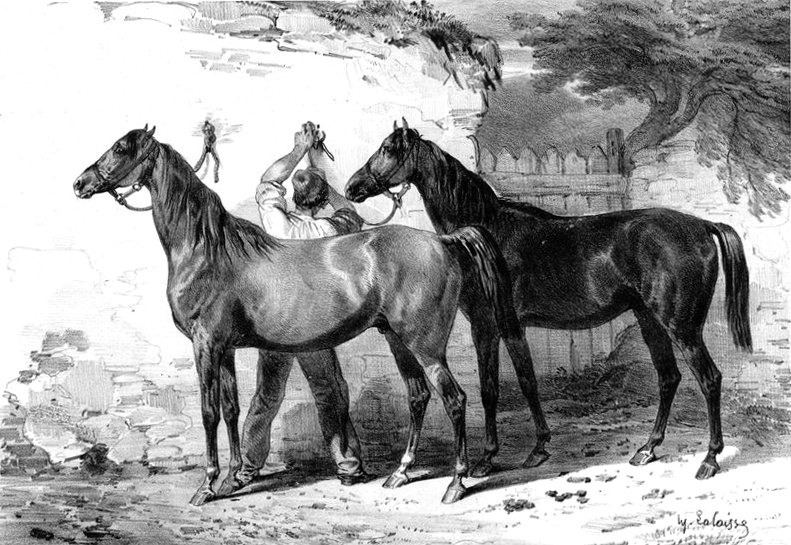
Auvergne cavalry horses in 1850

The half-bloods of Auvergne were one of three breeds used for light cavalry at the beginning of the 19th century, along with the Navarrin horse and the Limousin horse. It is reputed to be "the best breed in the Republic for light troops, dragoons, hussars, and cavalry officers". The best animals in the service are found in Mont-Dore: "well dimensioned, nervous, and never prone to sore eyes or legs". The National Stud in Aurillac then purchased their Auvergne horses in the departments of Cantal, Puy-de-Dôme, Corrèze, and Aveyron at various fairs.

The breeding of Auvergne horses for light cavalry was managed by the National Stud and associated farmers. As the size of the Auvergne horse was too small for light cavalry it was crossed with the Thoroughbred and Anglo-Norman resulting in the "half-blood Auvergne" a horse of "light size" destined for war and widely used during the wars of empire. It had little in common with the old type of breed. Farmers were reluctant to cross with Thoroughbreds, preferring the Arabian. Although Eugene Gayot defended the usefulness of these crosses, they often had poor results from creating horses with slender limbs, long kidneys, flat ribs, and a lot less hardy than the original Auvergne horse According to Andre Sanson they had strong ancestral qualities of the Auvergne horse. In addition rearing conditions were so bad that a third of the population was infected by periodic ophthalmia.

The Auvergne horse from Quercy and Rouergue was often bay with a strong and thick mane and a head resembling that of Merens. Sober, strong, and agile: well suited for the dry and rocky slopes of those regions. They provided reliable service in the cavalry for many years and consumed very little. They were sold at fairs in Cantal, Lot, and Aveyron.

The old Auvergne horse was never a luxury horse - it is a true mountain horse used as a saddle horse, for war, and for hunting. It is exclusively intended for riding and "eminently suited for saddling" because his physiognomy is poorly suited to the harness. It is also a fast animal that has "sometimes defeated good English race horses": the races in Aurillac at the beginning of the 19th century led some owners to be more selective although the Auvergne horse often remains in the shadow of its neighbour - the Limousin horse.

=== The Communal horse ===
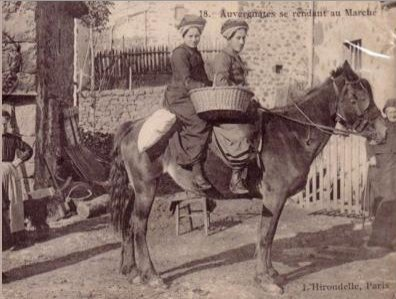
Auvergne people going to market (19th century)

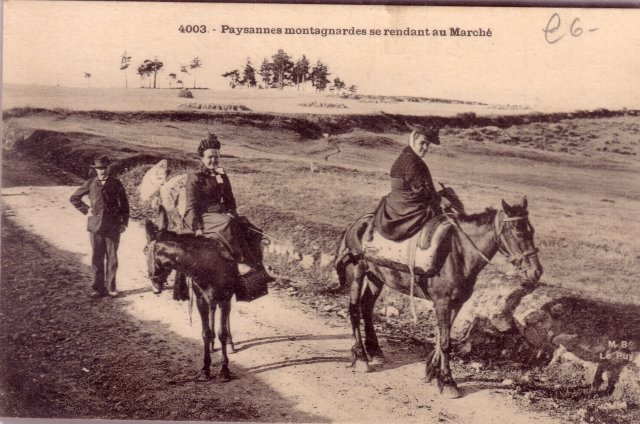
Mountain people going to the market on their horses (19th century)

At the end of the 18th century and throughout the 19th century farmers in the Auvergne region raised a light communal horse with the ability to work and withstand harsh mountain winters. This horse was a great success throughout the 19th century with the breed becoming a Draft horse with a popular character and rusticity. According to a report in 1873 the old Auvergne "light" breed was then considered lost due to the development of roads suitable for motor vehicles in the region from the 1830s. This had the effect of reducing the need to own a saddle horse and promoted the breeding of a light driving draft horse more useful for local farmers as it allowed them to work with it in the fields. Horse breeding for saddle horses was only slightly profitable for farmers. Draft horses were then imported from Perche, Normandy, Brittany, and Poitou and crossed with the light breed in the country which gave the Auvergne "communal" horse.

The communal Auvergne horse is an animal that is "dual purpose" intended primarily to pull carts but lacking the strength to plough. It is only used to do agricultural and farm work and sometimes is used in the production of mules: in the 1850s about 6,500 mares were covered each year in Auvergne, 5,827 were given a Donkey for only 673 covered by horses. Mares also carried out the threshing of wheat. At two and a half years foals from mares from Aveyron were employed threshing grain, ploughing, and carrying Pack saddles.

=== Disappearance of the old type ===
The old Auvergne horse as it existed before cross-breeding disappeared due to the development of paved roads. In 1846 the disappearance of the Auvergne horse in Cantal "is about to become complete". In 1855 the light Auvergne horse used for the army was considered permanently lost through cross-breeding. Mr. Liégeard, the Director of Aurillac National Stud, said a year later that "if the Auvergne breed existed, one knows that this breed unfortunately does not live other than in the memory of those who have lived in the country 20 or 25 years ago".

=== Decline and preservation ===
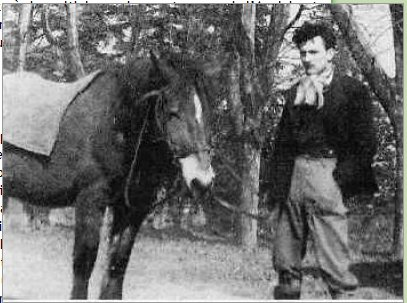
The Auvergne horse at the beginning of the 20th century

From the beginning of the 20th century progress and improvement of roads caused a decline in the production of Auvergne horses. Half-blood types disappeared with the end of cavalry in the army. The horses bred in the region were, according to a study in 1908, "locked in unhealthy stables and poorly fed". A letter from the National Stud at Aurillac to the Minister of Agriculture dated 4 April 1932 reported a "very mixed stock of mares, so disparate as to exclude any notion of a fixed breed". Two-thirds of Auvergne horses were of a light mountain type with a strong temperament and an average height not exceeding 1.55 m with a dark coat.

The population of working horses decreased and the end of animal traction for field work threatened the extinction of the breed. The remaining animals were descendants of the old Auvergne work horse and the Limousin horse which also disappeared. In the 1960s and 1970s some horses were bred with Breton and Comtois traits for meat production but despite these crosses the Auvergne horse retained its characteristics.

In 1997 the Association for the Preservation and Revitalization of the Auvergne horse was created to save the breed. In 2006 it received financial support of €3,000 from the Regional Council. It was recognised as an organisation of general interest in September 2009 and was then located in the Moidas area at Orbeil next to Issoire. Efforts are being focused on rebalancing the workforce and the preservation of the qualities of hardiness of these mountain horses. The association also tries to obtain official recognition to benefit from aid to save endangered breeds.

The purpose of the association for the Auvergne breed is to increase the number of births by twenty to fifty per year. For this purpose, it proposed in 2006 €150 in assistance for owners of mares close to the characteristics of the breed to encourage them to breed their animals by one of eight approved stallions to cover part of the costs of travel and board for the stallion. The Regional Natural Park of Volcanoes in Auvergne, the National Stud of Aurillac, and the general councils support the association in its actions. In 2008 it created a catalogue of standards to conform to the breed standard and to follow up the herd. In the following year the first competition for appearance for the breed was organized.

In April 2010 the association changed its name to the National Association of Auvergne breed horse (ANCRA). In October of the same year an agreement was signed with the Institut français du cheval et de l'équitation (French Institute for the Horse and Horse riding or IFCE) for management of the brand Cheval Auvergne (Auvergne Horse). The homogeneity of the animals in their morphology, their psychology, and their expression north and south of the Massif Central is the main argument for fixing the dominant genes.

The studbook project, monitored by the National Stud of Aurillac has led to the official recognition of the breed in December 2012.

== Uses ==
The Auvergne horse is used for equestrian tourism and pleasure riding in its native region because it has the advantage of being fully adapted to the environment of the highlands. It may have a future in both activities as its morphology allows it to be mounted with a light carriage. The significant development of equestrian tourism in the region is another plus. The horse works well as a driving horse. Very versatile, Auvergne horses are likely to give good service in riding schools through their physiognomy and good character that reassures beginners. They are also good in Competitive trail riding competitions.

The horse can be used as a work horse in Market gardening for the maintenance of vines and hauling logs. Mares are bred for their milk at the Ferme Équestre des Roches located in Rochefort-Montagne who market soap and mare's milk of Auvergne. From 19 to 23 September 2007 the Regional Natural Park of the Volcanoes of Auvergne organised for its 30th anniversary a traveling caravan of saddled and mounted Auvergne horses carrying local products through its territory.

=== In culture ===
An Auvergne horse "small but very beautiful" was mentioned in the famous novel The Three Musketeers by Alexandre Dumas. There used to be a musket horse that accompanied Porthos. Cantal, a speckled gray horse ridden by Napoleon Bonaparte at the Battle of Austerlitz was presumed to be an Auvergne horse. His portrait in oil is in the Municipal Museum of Aurillac.

== Dissemination ==
The Auvergne work horse has historically never been exported, unlike the half-blood which was largely for French cavalry troops. The ANCRA (National Association of the Auvergne horse breed) now aims to bring together farmers, users, and enthusiasts of the breed to develop their farm in the Massif Central - the home of the breed. They are also occupied in promoting the Auvergne horse and herd management. They organise two competitions each year on style and appearance: one is at Saint-Bonnet-le-Chastel on the fourth Sunday of October.

In 2006 150 horses had been identified, mainly in Puy-de-Dôme and Cantal. In December 2007 the number had risen to 184. Forty mares were projected in 2006, 25 foals were reported, and 21 foals were recorded under the titles of descent. Some horses that are close to the traits of the Auvergne horse were reported in the Alps in 2006. In 2012, the total number of horses is about 300 head with 50 births per year.

== See also ==
- List of French horse breeds
