= Equine recurrent uveitis =

Eye disease of horses

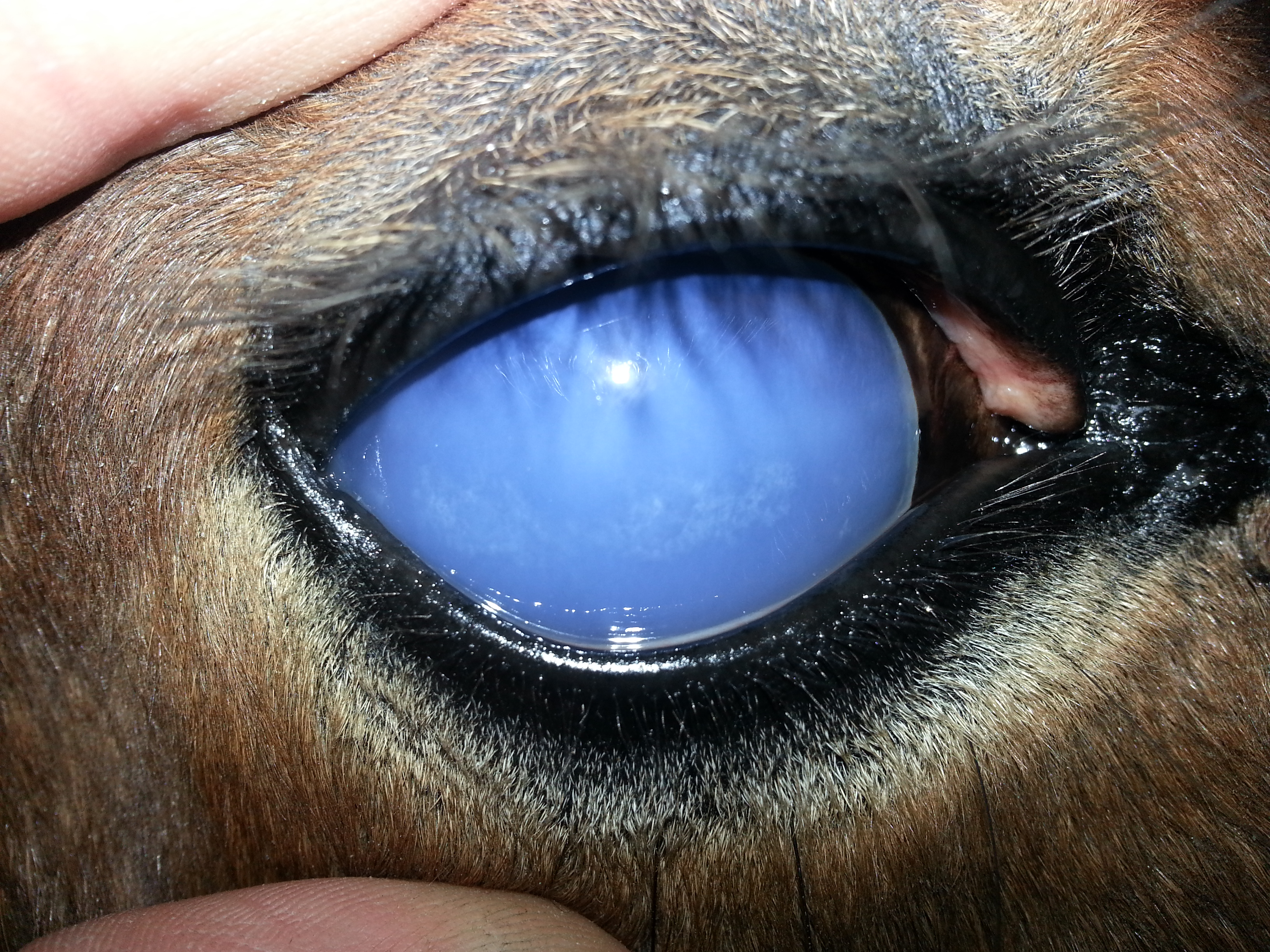
"Moon blindness" on an Icelandic horse

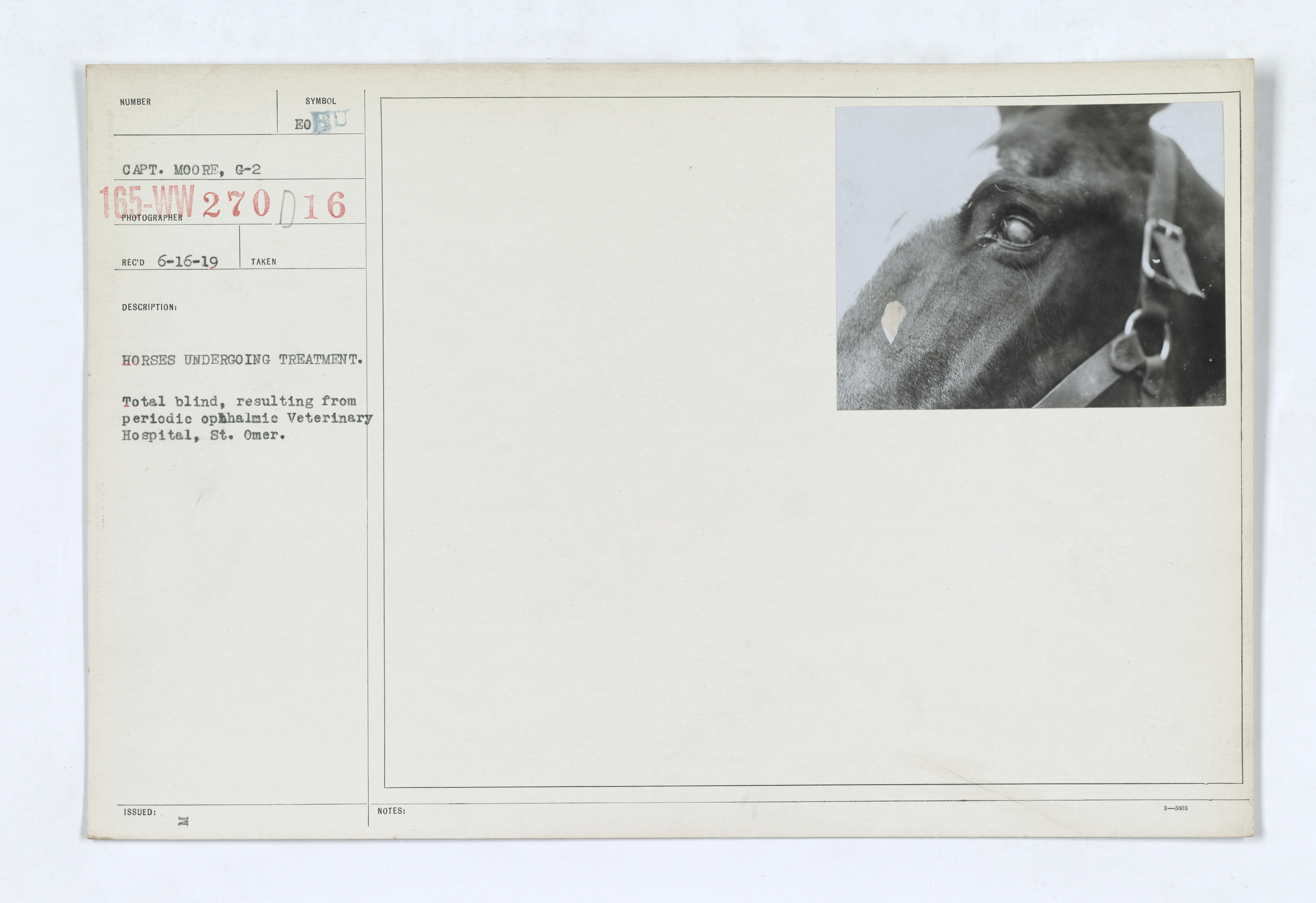
Advanced stage of disease

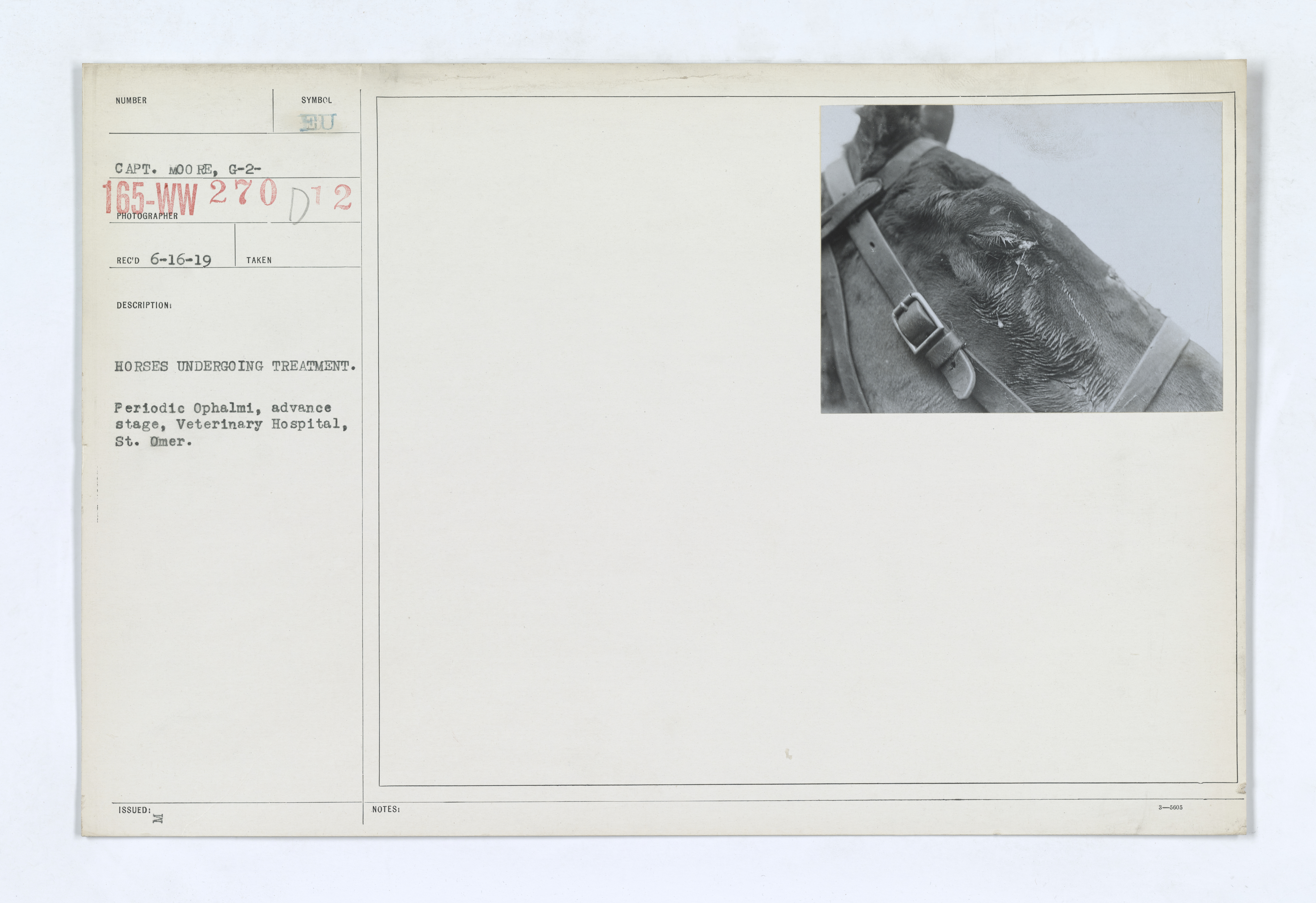
Advanced stage of disease

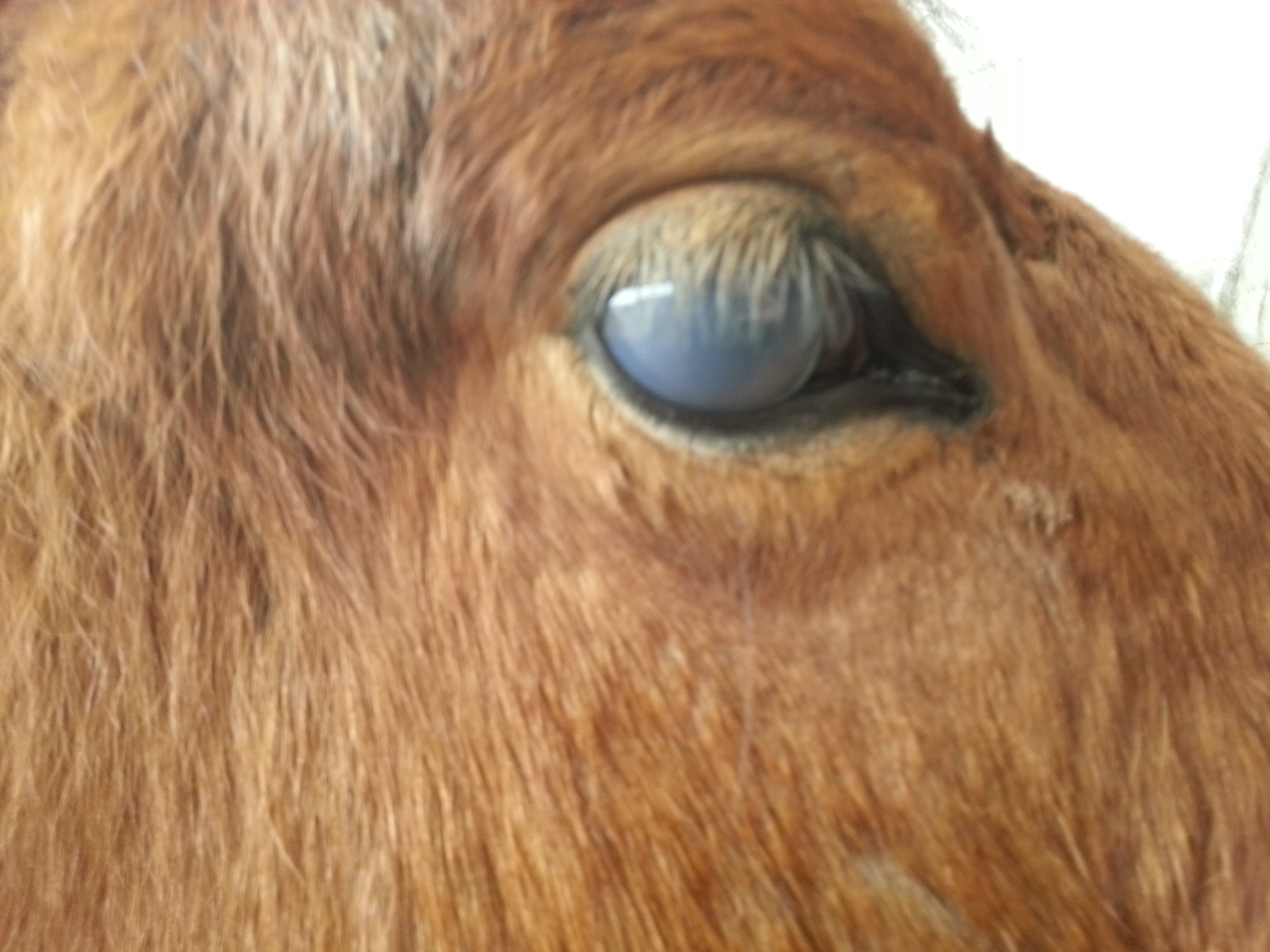
ERU on an Icelandic horse

Equine recurrent uveitis (ERU) – also known as moon blindness, recurrent iridocyclitis, or periodic ophthalmia – is an acute, nongranulomatous inflammation of the uveal tract of the eye, occurring commonly in horses of all breeds, worldwide. The causative factor is not known, but several pathogeneses have been suggested. It is the most common cause of blindness in horses. In some breeds, a genetic factor may be involved.

== Aetiology ==
Several aetiologies are suggested, and any combination of these may be present in any given case.

- Vitamin deficiency (A, B or C)
- Viral infection
- Bacterial infection
  - Leptospira
  - Streptococcus
  - Brucella
- Parasitic infection
  - Strongyle
  - Onchocerca cervicalis
- Autoimmune disease

The disease has been suggested to be primarily autoimmune in nature, being a delayed hypersensitivity reaction to any of the above agents.

== Clinical signs ==
In the acute stage of the disease, a catarrhal conjunctivitis is present, with signs of ocular pain, usually blepharospasm, increased lacrimation, and photophobia. Miosis is also usually present. After a few days, this will progress to a keratitis and iridocyclitis. Other ocular problems may also occur, including conjunctival and corneal oedema, and aqueous flare.

After an acute flare-up, no clinical signs of disease may be seen for a prolonged period, which can vary from a few hours to a few years. With frequent acute incidents, though, additional clinical signs may be seen, including anterior and posterior synechiae, poor pupillary responses, cataracts, and a cloudy appearance to the vitreous humour.

== Diagnosis ==
The cornerstone of diagnosis is an accurate history, and a good clinical examination of the eye, to eliminate traumatic uveitis. Ultrasonography is a useful tool, as it can detect a thickened iris, but only in the hands of an expert.

== Treatment ==
During an acute flare-up, therapy is targeted at reducing the inflammation present, and dilating the pupil. Mydriasis is important, as pupillary constriction is the primary reason for pain. Anti-inflammatory therapy is usually given both systemically, often in the form of flunixin meglumine, and topically, as prednisolone acetate. The mydriatic of choice is atropine. In the periods between acute attacks, no therapy has been shown to be beneficial.

== Prognosis ==
Horses that suffer from this disease can never be considered cured, although they can be managed by careful use of the therapy described above, and fast detection of new flare-ups. If the disease is not properly treated, it will eventually lead to blindness.

== Epidemiology ==
ERU occurs in horses worldwide, but is more common in North America than in Europe, Australia or South Africa. Males and females are equally affected.

== Genetics ==
The Appaloosa has a higher risk of developing ERU than other breeds; this predisposition has a genetic basis. Appaloosas which develop ERU are more likely than other breeds to have ERU in both eyes, and more likely to become blind in one or both eyes.
