= Navarrin horse =

Breed of horse

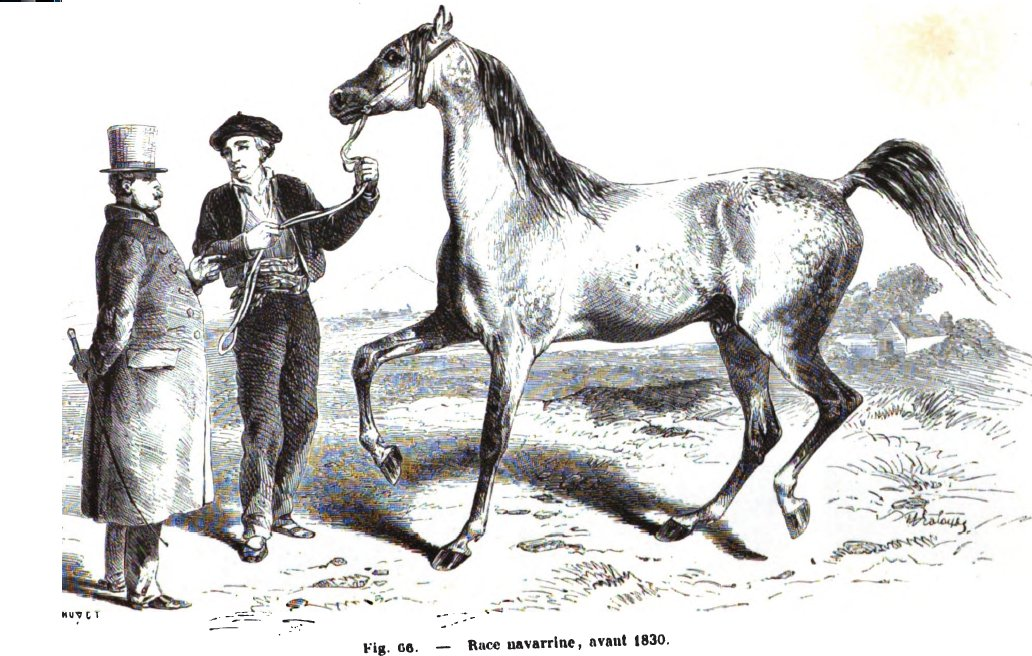
- Navarrin horse before 1830
- Conservation status: extinct
- Other names: Cheval navarrin
- Country of origin: South-west France

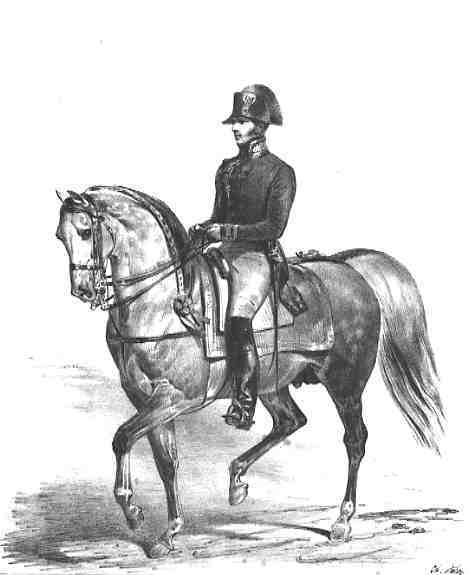
M. Flandrin, riding instructor on Janissaire, a Navarrin from the Saumur cavalry school (1833)

The Cheval Navarrin, also called Navarin, Navarrois, Tarbais, Tarbésan or Bigourdin, was an extinct French horse breed. It originated in the plains of the Pyrenees around Tarbes, as well as in Bigorre in the Hautes-Pyrénées, and was more broadly distributed across southwestern France. The breed was reputed to have been a prestigious riding horse during the Middle Ages and the Renaissance, and it enjoyed a strong reputation throughout the 18th century. Small in stature, hardy, refined, and lively, the Cheval Navarrin was widely used as a remount for light cavalry. It was also employed as a saddle horse in riding schools and for the practice of classical dressage, owing to its elegance and agility.

== Terminology ==
According to a 19th-century academic source, the breed was originally designated as race navarraise and cheval navarrais. However, common usage within equestrian circles led to the adoption of the terms cheval navarrin and race navarrine. The hippologist Alexandre-Bernard Vallon noted that “usage must be the law", emphasizing the primacy of common practice in nomenclature. In the early 20th century, it was suggested that the breed might more appropriately have been named Pyrénéenne. The term navarrins was used to describe the small horses found in the departments of Hautes-Pyrénées, Pyrénées-Atlantiques, Ariège, and Haute-Garonne. The designation cheval navarin also appears in the literature, though less frequently.

The name of the breed evolved over time, reflecting changes in breeding practices. Cheval navarrin is considered the earliest designation. Following crossbreeding with Arabian horses in the Tarbes plain during the 19th century, the breed became known as the cheval tarbéen. Subsequent crossbreeding with Thoroughbreds led to the name cheval bigourdin. By around 1850, the director of the Tarbes national stud was already referring to these horses as Bigourdins.

== History up to 1833 ==
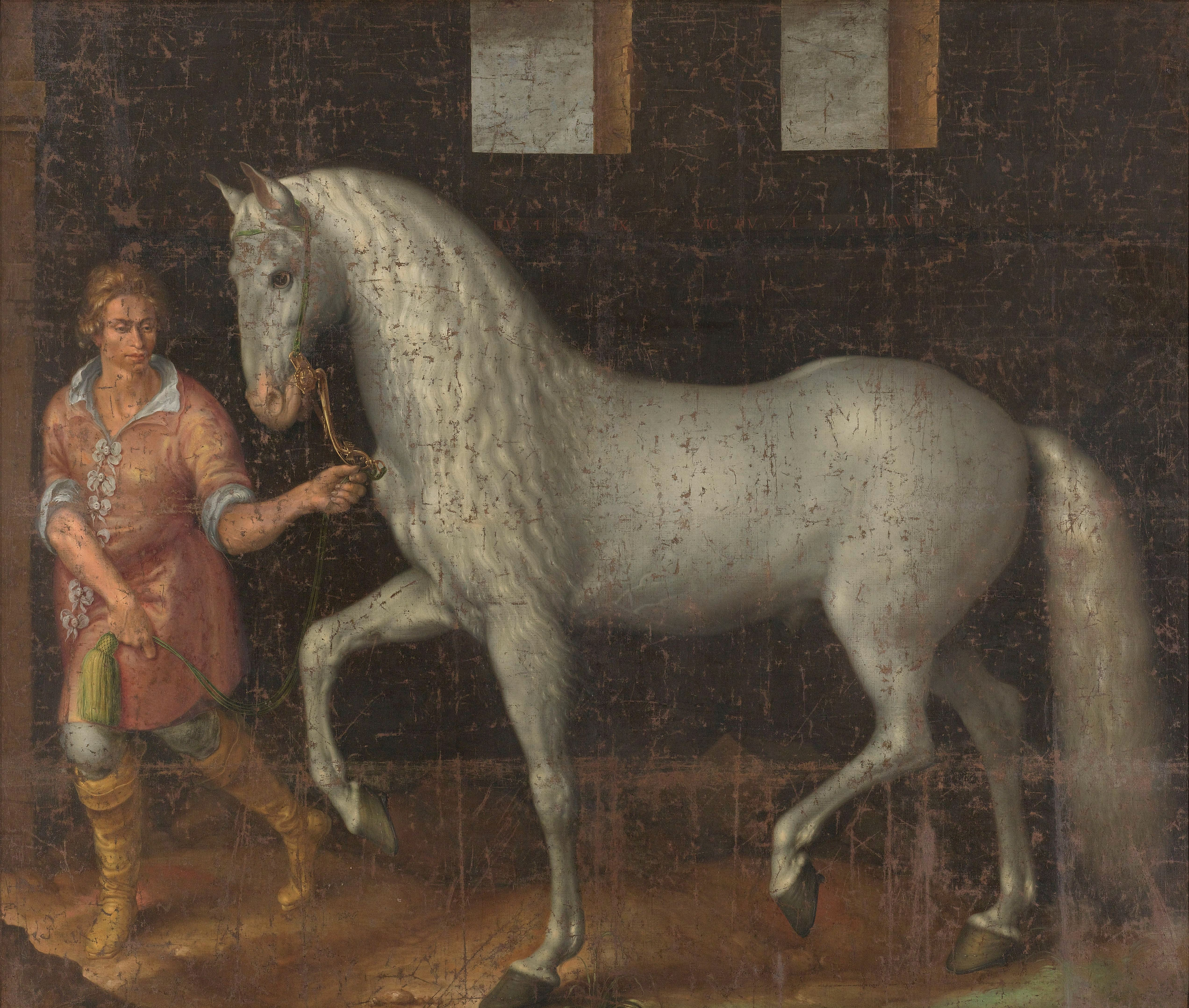
Andalusian battle horse in 1603, physically similar to the Navarrin's ancestor

=== Origins ===
The Navarrin horse, described in the 19th century as “the natural product of the Tarbes plain", is believed to have originated in Navarre. Its characteristics were shaped by the climate and terrain of its native region, while crossbreeding with other local and foreign breeds influenced its development.

The proximity of southwestern France to Spain facilitated frequent equine exchanges over the centuries. While the Navarrin may have incorporated some Arabian or Barb influence, it appears to have been more closely related to Spanish horses, which contributed significantly to its morphology. Nineteenth-century encyclopedias often described it as a variety of Spanish horse infused with Oriental blood. The breed was present throughout most of southwestern France, with its primary centers of origin in Béarn, French Lower Navarre, and Bigorre, corresponding to the modern Hautes- and Basses-Pyrénées departments.

=== Antiquity, Middle Ages, and Renaissance ===
Éphrem Houël noted in 1848 that the Navarrin had been considered one of the best horses in Gaul since the time of Julius Caesar.

During the Middle Ages, the breed was valued as a jennet: vigorous and agile, though less robust than palfreys. Medieval French genets are thought to have been Navarrin horses rather than Andalusians, with both breeds competing in the practice of classical dressage. During the Renaissance, the Navarrin remained prized. Under Louis XIV, breeders continued to seek horses with a “Barb-like head,” a characteristic associated with the breed.

=== 18th century ===
In the 18th century, Navarrins were regarded as one of France’s finest saddle horse breeds. They were present in the remount depots of Tarbes and at the Visens estate in Lourdes. Crossbreeding with Spanish stallions had been ongoing for generations. In the Pyrenean region, policies between 1763 and 1779 prioritized the preservation of the Navarrin breed, even at the expense of mule breeding.

It is unclear when the breed reached its peak in terms of prosperity and distribution, although its breeding predates the French Revolution. By the late 18th century, however, some hippologists expressed concern over the breed’s “degeneration.” Wars and requisitions during the Revolutionary and Napoleonic periods significantly reduced its numbers, as occurred with most French saddle horse breeds. Spanish armies, whether Carlist or Christino, frequently purchased young horses at high prices, benefiting breeders in the Tarbes region.

From 1779 onward, imported Arabian stallions were crossed with local horses, altering the traditional Navarrin type. The Spanish-style head characteristic of the breed disappeared, and Navarrins became lighter, more elegant, and closer in type to Arabian horses—slimmer, smaller, and more refined—compared with the generally more powerful and corpulent Andalusian horse.

=== 1800–1833 ===
==== Requisitions ====
During the Napoleonic Wars, the Navarrin horse was significantly affected by military demands. In 1807, Napoleon re-established the national stud administration, which had been abolished during the French Revolution, with the aim of improving local breeds for military purposes. The ongoing war against Spain led to the loss of many horses each year, prompting efforts to reinforce the regional equine stock. At that time, the Navarrin was believed to descend directly from Spanish horses, and Spanish stallions were introduced into the Pyrenees to restore “substance, bone, size, and depth” to local horses. However, these imports also introduced traits considered undesirable for light cavalry, including a large head, long and widely set ears, and elevated, shortened movement, poorly suited to the demands of cavalry service. Spanish horses were also thought to produce offspring inferior to those of Oriental breeds.

==== Stock reconstitution ====
Following the end of the Napoleonic Wars, breeders and zootechnicians sought to rebuild the Navarrin population after extensive requisitions. Crossbreeding with Arabian and Thoroughbred stallions was undertaken under the direction of the Tarbes national stud. Arabian stallions, as well as Turkish and Persian horses, were imported into Béarn and Navarre and bred with the remaining Navarrin mares. The resulting horses, sometimes referred to as the “Tarbais horse,” generally met the size requirements for light cavalry but rarely exceeded 1.52 m (5 ft 0 in).

==== Breeding methods ====
Most Pyrenean breeders were smallholders who recognized that Arabian blood was particularly suited to their local stock. The Navarrin type remained most distinct in the Tarbes region. Certain Arabian stallions, including Mahomet, Camasch, Schamitz, and Schaklarvic, were noted for their influence on the breed, described in contemporary accounts as “noble sires who planted the precious seeds of improvement in the Navarrin breed". Despite being raised and maintained economically by peasants, the breed exhibited a remarkably uniform type and a pronounced Oriental character, particularly among broodmares in the Tarbes valley, Ossau, Aspe, and along both banks of the Gaves of Pau and Oloron.

== Description ==
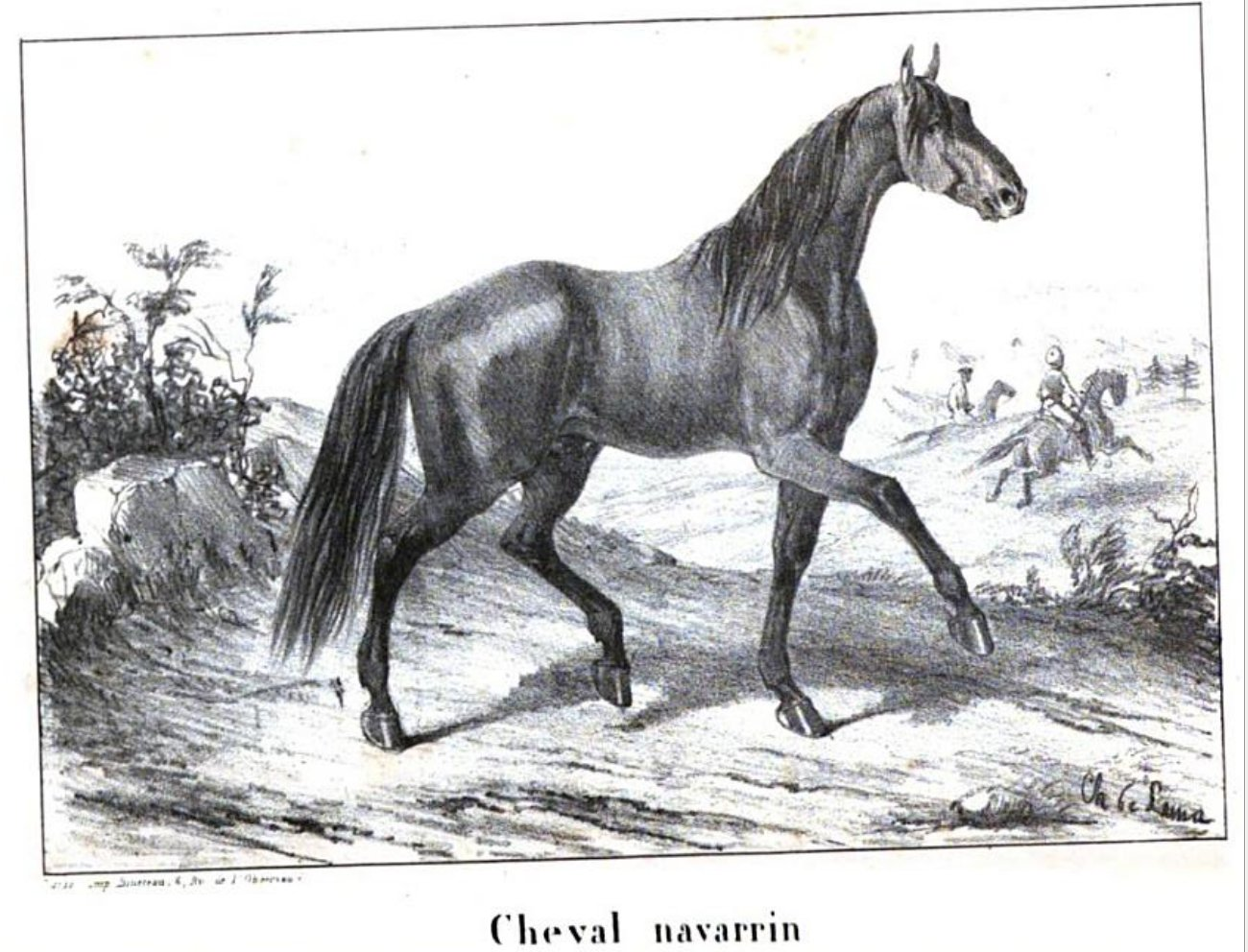
Engraving of a Navarrin horse in the second volume of the Dictionnaire d'hippiatrique et d'équitation, 1848.

Portraying the Navarrin horse prior to systematic stud crossing is challenging. It was considered a noble and prestigious breed, described as “the noble and light horses of this breed, which cannot be confused with the common stock, resemble either the Andalusian type or the English type".

=== Morphology ===
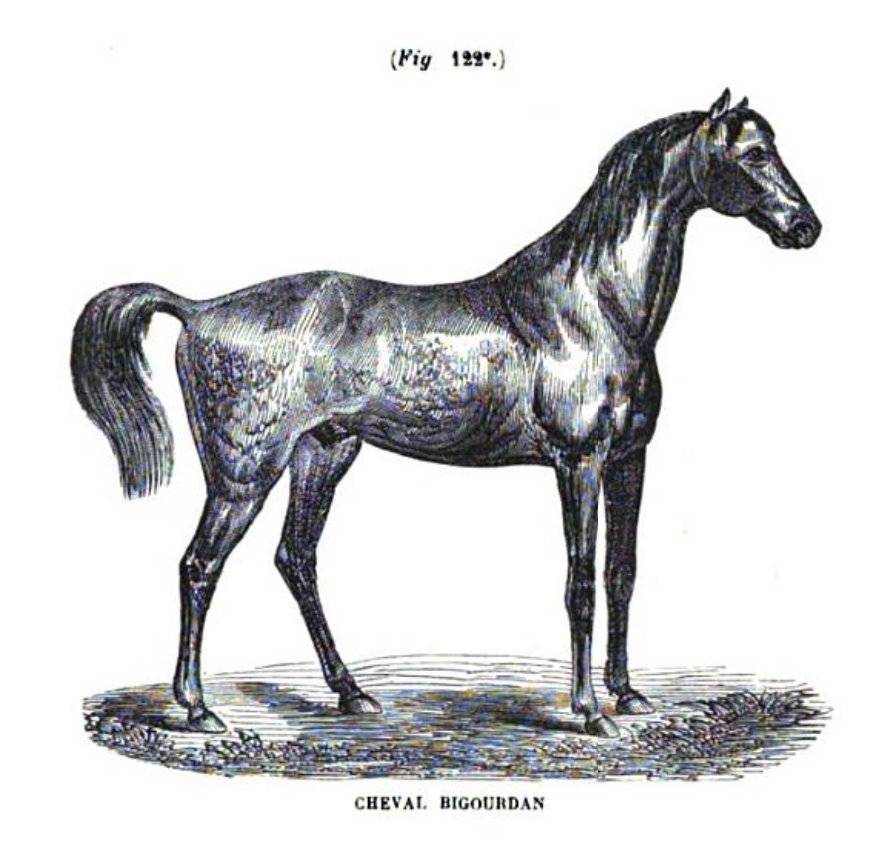
Engraving of a "Bigourdin horse" published in 1863.

General appearance of the old Navarrin

The external conformation of the early Navarrin likely resembled that of the Barb or Andalusian horses from which it descended, but it exhibited distinct characteristics. Compared with the Andalusian, the Navarrin was generally taller and less massive, with a longer and less arched neck, higher withers, a lower back that was occasionally slightly hollow, a more angular croup, bent hocks, and gaits that were more elevated and cadenced rather than extended. While less supple and elegant than the Andalusian, it was valued for its vigor and lightness, with an overall angular build.

General appearance after Arabian crossings

Following crossbreeding with Arabian stallions, the Navarrin acquired a distinct “Arabian stamp,” reflecting traits well adapted to the climate and terrain of the Pyrenees. The breed developed more elegant and harmonious forms, becoming a small, refined, and well-balanced horse. Mares in particular displayed “dry, elegant, and well-harmonized” conformation reminiscent of primitive Arabian types. The Navarrin was renowned for its elegance, combining the prized qualities of light saddle horses with characteristics inherited from its Pyrenean and Spanish origins. At a time when purebred Arabians were considered the epitome of equine perfection, these traits made the Tarbes horse one of France’s most esteemed and aesthetically admired mounts, before the English horse gained prominence in fashion and military preference.

Height

The ideal height of the Navarrin horse ranged from 1.48 m to 1.51 m at the withers. Horses exceeding this range were considered to lose proportional harmony and elegance. The smallest horses, particularly those of pure stock raised on the Pyrenean soil, were traditionally regarded as the best.

Head

The head of the Navarrin varied with breeding influences. In the old Spanish type, it was relatively strong, often convex, heavy, but expressive, with a bulging forehead and a slanted muzzle. Through Arabian crossbreeding, the head became smaller and lighter, though the ears were not always ideally set.

Forehand and back

Spanish-type Navarrins had a powerful neck, whereas Arabian-influenced horses displayed a longer, lighter neck, well set on, muscled, and sometimes gracefully arched in motion. The withers were high, the chest narrow (though broader in the Tarbes type), and the shoulder strong, straight, and well-loaded. The back was low with a well-aligned topline. The body, originally thick-set, became more refined under Arabian influence.

Hindquarters

The loin line was generally well defined, with long loins (shorter in the Tarbes horse), and a short, angular croup that was sharp-edged, sometimes sloping, yet well muscled. The tail was well set.

Limbs

The limbs combined strength and solidity with slender, fine, and dry characteristics. They were well muscled in the upper parts, though the lower limbs sometimes exhibited light cannon bones and tendons with long pasterns, terminating in small, solid, and sure feet. The forelimbs tended to be close-set due to a narrow chest, while the hind limbs were stronger, with hocks often close together. Toed-out conformation was occasionally observed but declined during the 19th century.

=== Temperament ===
Despite a slender and slight appearance, the Navarrin horse was energetic, courageous, and exhibited all qualities desirable in a saddle horse: supple, agile, spirited, tireless, and hard-working. The breed was characterized by a sanguine and nervous temperament, while remaining gentle, frugal, patient, and hardy. It was esteemed for both its elegance and the suppleness of its movements, as well as the speed and lightness of its action. Eugène Gayot described it as “a saddle horse full of elegance, pride, and kindness, more charming and pretty than powerful and handsome".

== Uses ==
The Navarrin horse was long regarded as a prestigious saddle horse, often compared favorably to the Andalusian and described as “this Thoroughbred of another era."

Primarily bred for riding, it was highly valued by the military, serving as a remount for three regiments of hussars: Belzunce, Bercheny, and Chamborand. The breed was suitable for light cavalry, line cavalry, and remount purposes, and was also employed at the cavalry academy’s riding school. Once integrated into military service, Navarrins adapted readily, performed reliably over extended periods, and were highly esteemed; contemporaries remarked that “light cavalry regiments cannot find better horses for remounting.” Throughout the 18th century and particularly during the Napoleonic Empire and Restoration periods, the Navarrin remained a sought-after mount for both military and light troops.

Riders at the French riding school also valued the breed for classical dressage, appreciating its suppleness and aptitude for demanding equestrian training.

Although primarily a saddle horse, the Navarrin could be harnessed for light, elegant draft work when necessary. By the 1840s, mares from the Tarbes plain were reputedly used for horse racing.

== Distribution ==
During the 18th century, the Navarrin was widespread across the Tarbes plain and Bigorre in the Hautes-Pyrénées. Its range extended throughout southwestern France, including Navarre, Béarn, Roussillon, Foix, Guyenne, and Languedoc. Horse breeding in the Pyrenean region was a profitable enterprise; for instance, the commune of Moirax purchased 20 to 25 foals annually at the Lectoure fair.

Navarrin horses were not confined to southwestern France; they were also exported to regions such as Normandy and Cantal, reflecting the breed’s reputation and demand beyond its native area.

== History and evolution after 1833 ==
A few historical documents mention the Navarrin horse after 1833. For instance, the riding master François Baucher reportedly had the opportunity to train horses of this breed, and around 1840, the National Veterinary School of Alfort recorded two “Navarrin horses” in studies on equine vices and pathologies. Despite these references, the breed gradually declined due to crossbreeding, influenced by the Tarbes stud and by Eugène Gayot, described as a “great advocate of the Thoroughbred.

=== Thoroughbred crossings ===
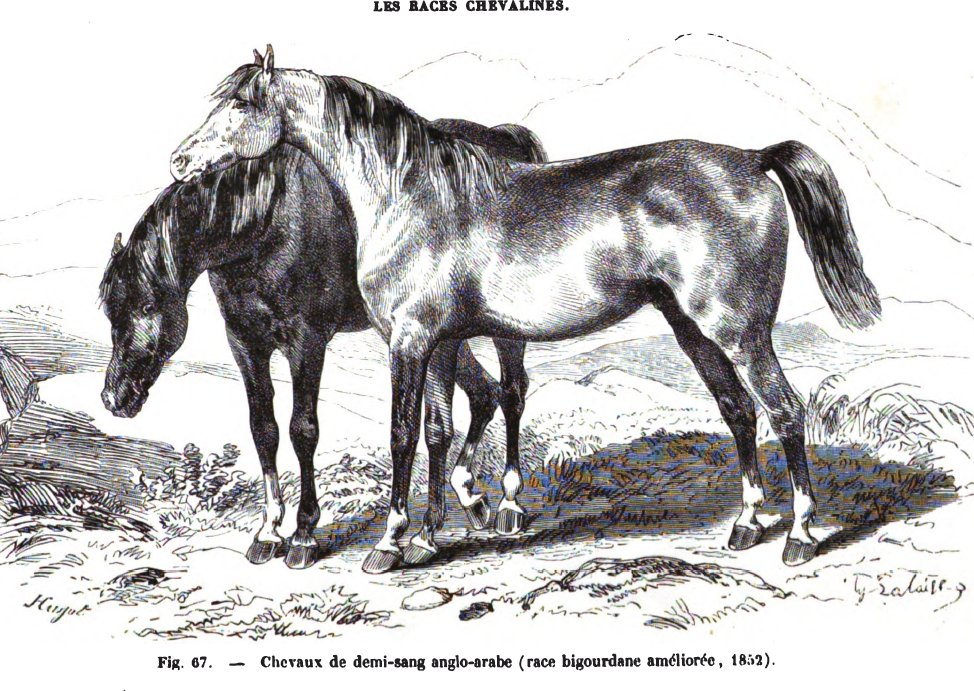
"Improved Bigourdin horse," Navarrin-Thoroughbred cross, Anglo-Arabian ancestor.

During the Napoleonic Wars, the Navarrin breed underwent crossbreeding intended to produce a horse suitable for military service. Throughout the 19th century, these crosses increasingly altered the defining characteristics of the original breed. The hippologist Eugène Gayot, a prominent promoter of such crossbreeding, considered the Navarrin’s slender conformation a disadvantage for light cavalry service. Comparing horses from different regions in 1861, Gayot stated that “the horse of the Basses-Pyrénées is more peasant-like, less advanced from a breeding standpoint,” whereas “that of the Hautes-Pyrénées is more aristocratic and occupies a higher rank on the scale".

Until 1833, Arabian horses were the primary breed crossed with the Navarrin. Afterward, a new crossbreeding program supported by Gayot aimed to “increase and enlarge the breed, to develop it in height and substance without depriving it of its elegance, to lengthen its gaits, to extend its abilities without taking away any of its suppleness and grace". The initiative sought to adapt the breed to the requirements of light cavalry, which demanded horses that were both hardy and agile, yet of greater size.

==== Applications ====
To achieve these goals, English Thoroughbred stallions were introduced at Pau and Tarbes, and most breeders entrusted their mares to these stallions. From 1833 onward, extensive crossbreeding occurred, and the resulting horses became known as either the “improved Bigourdin horse,” according to Gayot—who spearheaded the program and was criticized by the hippologist André Sanson—or the “Tarbais horse."

==== Criticisms ====
The crossbreeding program, supported by Eugène Gayot and Jean-Henri Magne, was criticized for its limited effectiveness in military contexts. Some experts argued that the resulting horses lost much of the hardiness characteristic of the original Navarrin breed, leading to higher equine losses in service. Count de Lastic noted that, in southern France, English Thoroughbred stallions generally produced poorer results when crossed with local breeds than Arabian stallions, whereas the opposite was true in northern regions. By 1860, this view was partly reconsidered, with territory and environmental conditions being recognized as significant factors influencing equine morphology. Additional factors contributing to the limited success of these crosses included poor forage quality in the Pyrenees and the relative inexperience of local breeders with English Thoroughbred stock.

=== Disappearance ===
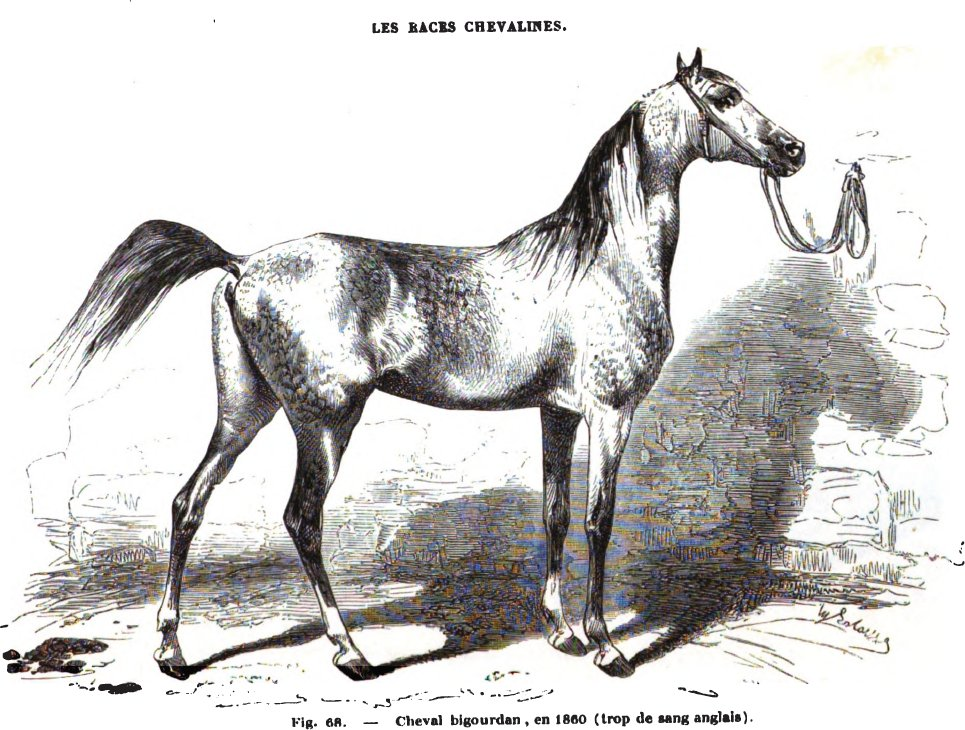
1860 Bigourdin engraving, absorbed by Thoroughbred crossings.

The decline of the Navarrin horse appears to have occurred around the middle of the 19th century. By 1848, it was reported that “the charming Navarrin horse has everywhere given way to the products of racecourse blood, which are very widespread in Tarbes and Pau". An encyclopedia published that same year noted that only a few individuals of the breed remained. At this time, the differences between the original Navarrin horse and crossbred animals were already pronounced.

In 1850, Eugène Gayot—who consistently advocated for the crossbreeding of the Navarrin—asserted the superiority of Anglo-Arabian stallions, stating that they “advantageously replace half-bred Arabians and pure Navarrins". In 1863, Alexandre-Bernard Vallon reported that a few Navarrin horses could still be found in Béarn, French Navarre, and Bigorre, while noting that foals purchased in the Tarbes plain were “modified under the influence of changes in climate and feeding, and lose part of their distinctive characteristics". By 1868, at a scientific congress, the Navarrin breed was considered definitively lost through English crossbreeding, and it was no longer clear whether any representatives still existed.

=== Anglo-Arabian ===
The Navarrin horse was eventually absorbed into the Anglo-Arabian breed as part of a breeding program aimed at “combining the lightness, elegance, and endurance of the Arabian with the size, power, and speed of the Thoroughbred.” The Tarbes stud was the first institution to carry out official crosses between these two breeds. The program that led to the formation of the Anglo-Arabian was officially completed in 1852, although the resulting horses continued to be referred to for some time as “horses of Navarre".

Records from the Tarbes stallion depot illustrate both the creation of the Anglo-Arabian and the disappearance of the Navarrin horse. In 1830, the depot listed six Thoroughbred stallions, five purebred Arabians, twenty-three Arabian crossbreds, and nineteen stallions identified as belonging to the Navarrin breed. By 1850, all “pure” Navarrin stallions had disappeared, while the numbers of Thoroughbred and purebred Arabian stallions had increased to twenty-five and twenty-seven, respectively.
