= Dombes half-breed =

French saddle horse

Dombes half-breed Bresse horse Ain half-breed
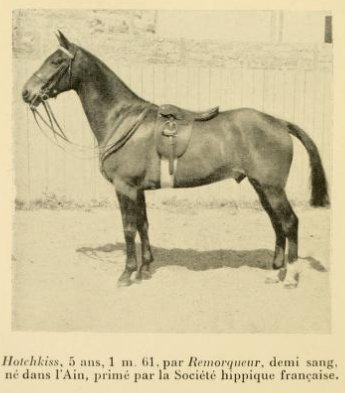
- A half-breed born in Ain, presented at Saumur in 1910
- Country of origin: France
- Distribution: Dombes and Bresse, Ain
- Use: Light cavalry, show jumping, cross-country, and hunting

Traits
- Weight: 420 to 550 kg
- Height: 1.56 to 1.60 m in the 19th century
- Color: Black or bay
- Color: Black or bay

The Dombes half-breed, also known as the Bresse horse in the Middle Ages and later as the Ain half-breed (demi-sang de l’Ain), was a French saddle horse originating from the regions of Dombes and Bresse in the present-day department of Ain. This type of horse was present from the late Middle Ages until the 16th century. Following the requisitions of 1799, the remaining population was crossbred with carriage horses from the Cotentin and Percheron, and later with Anglo-Norman horses and Thoroughbreds during the 19th century. Initially used as a military mount and later for sport, the breed continued until its incorporation into the Selle Français breed in 1958.

The Ain half-breed has been described as a rustic blood horse that was gradually transformed through crossbreeding into a larger sport horse. The breeding of French saddle horses descended from this lineage remains a traditional practice in the region and continues to represent a significant economic activity.

== Characteristics ==
The Dombes horse was historically a saddle horse of Anglo-Arabian type. In the mid-19th century, it stood between 1.56 and 1.60 meters and was usually black in coat color, although later iconographic sources depict chestnut or bay coats. By the 1930s, due to crossbreeding with Thoroughbreds, it had become a half-bred resembling the Anglo-Norman horse. In 1947, it was described as medium-sized, weighing between 420 and 550 kilograms, typically chestnut or bay in color, energetic in movement, and relatively hardy. Following its incorporation into the Selle Français breed in 1958, it became a larger competition horse, standing between 1.60 and 1.70 meters. It was regarded as elegant, vigorous, energetic, and agile, with a generally good temperament, as foals were typically handled during the winter months.

Management conditions evolved over time, and dietary changes influenced their conformation, while retaining their hardiness. Traditionally raised in semi-wild conditions, broodmares in the Dombes and Bresse were described as heavy and thickset, living semi-freely among woods and ponds, and grazing on Glyceria fluitans and marsh trefoil. Around 1910, breeding conditions in the Dombes were considered poor, producing small and weak horses. Until the mid-20th century, the breed was not regarded as a sport horse type.

== Breed history ==
Horse breeding in the department of Ain, particularly in the Dombes region, is a long-established tradition. According to Georges Chabot, it dates back to the invasions of the Middle Ages, while M. O’Brien traces its origins to Gallo-Roman horses, characterized by a short body, sloping loin, strong and high-set neck, light head, rounded croup, and slender limbs.

=== Middle Ages ===
The Burgundians who settled in the region in the 5th century likely obtained horses from the plateaus along the Saône. Subsequent influences included horses from the Saracen conquests in the 6th and 7th centuries, as well as rounceys imported from Germany and Switzerland, which contributed to increasing the size of the local stock. The region is thought to have specialized in warhorses.

Around 1330, the quality of the so-called “Bresse horses” was noted. In Dombes, the princes of Savoy established studs, including that of Solingeu (known as the stud of the Dukes of Savoy), created in the early 16th century above the Échets marsh. These studs were reputedly influenced by Oriental breeds and provided stallions for breeding. One stallion from this stock was reportedly given to Charles VIII of France, who named it Savoye, according to the chronicler Philippe de Commines:

On Monday morning, around seven o’clock, the sixth day of July, the year 1495, the noble king mounted on horseback and called several times; I came to him and found him armed in full armor and mounted on the finest horse I have ever seen in my time, called Savoye: many said that he was a Bresse horse; the Duke Charles of Savoy had given him, and he was black, and had only one eye, and was a medium-sized horse of good height for the one who was mounted upon him. This horse made him appear tall. […] The said lord had the best horse for him in the world.

— Philippe de Commines, Récit de la Bataille de Fornoue

According to commentators, the stallion Savoye, described by Philippe de Commines, was notable for its beauty and was used by Charles VIII of France as a battle horse, despite being one-eyed. Historian Francesco Guicciardini adds that the horse proved more useful to the king, through its liveliness, than some of his companions. The same horse was later given as a gift to King Henry VIII of England and is reported to have lived until 1530, reaching the age of forty.

=== Early modern period ===
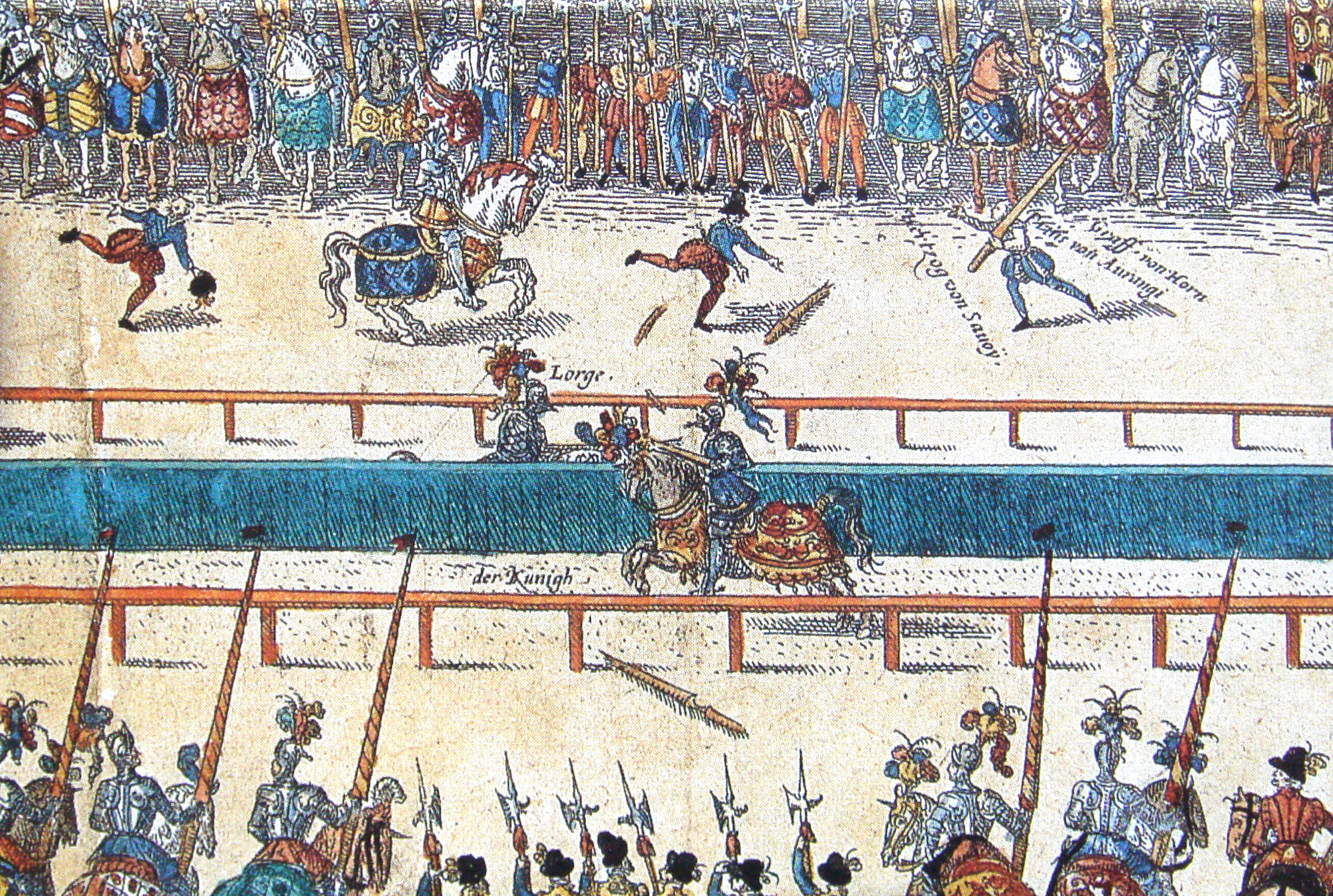
The fatal tournament, 16th-century German engraving. According to some sources, King Henry II's horse (at the bottom of the engraving) was from Bresse.

Some sources state that the horse ridden by King Henry II of France during the tournament against Gabriel I de Montgomery, in which the king was fatally injured, was a Bresse horse. The animal, reportedly named the Unfortunate, is said to have been of Turkish origin and a gift from M. de Savoie.

The Dombes breed was crossed with Oriental stallions under the influence of the Dukes of Savoy. According to statistics from the department of Ain compiled in 1808, both Francis I, at the Battle of Pavia, and Henry IV rode horses from the Dombes. In 1541, Francis I reportedly received six mares of this breed, while Henry IV established a stud near Tenay, at the Abbey of Saint-Sulpice, through his servant Baron de Pardaillan, using Bresse mares crossed with Spanish and German stallions.

After the annexation of Bresse to France in 1601, local studs were abolished, and the horses were crossed with Cotentin stallions, modifying the original type. In the 17th century, Colbert established royal studs to reduce imports into the region, and later Claude Bourgelat reorganized breeding practices. The stud of Fétan, located in Trévoux, was managed by the Count Cachet de Garnerans.

=== 19th century ===
In the 19th century, the Dombes was the only French region where horse breeding constituted the primary source of income, particularly in its central area. A major requisition in 1799 removed most of the best horses from the department of Ain. In the following years, horse quality declined, and livestock breeding became largely limited to cattle. During the Napoleonic Empire and until 1815, the few stallions introduced into the department mainly came from the stud of Annecy. A departmental stud operated from 1818 to 1863, after which its management was taken over by the Société Hippique de l’Ain until 1895. The State granted an annual subsidy of 2,500 francs for breeding until 1833.

During the 1820s and 1830s, foals were sold in large numbers at the fairs of Montmerle and Ambérieux-en-Dombes, and by the mid-19th century these sales generated significant revenue, estimated at 200,000 francs annually. Most of the animals originated from the district of Trévoux. In the 1840s, the Dombes breed began to regain its reputation, and in the mid-19th century a remount depot was established in Mâcon to provide financial support for Dombes horse breeding.

The program initially involved the purchase of ten stallions and ten mares in Normandy. In 1819, ten Cotentin stallions and mares were imported, a process that continued for six years. The General Council also acquired Percheron stallions for the arrondissement of Trévoux. From 1818 to 1830 (or until 1840, according to Eugène Gayot), Cotentin stallions influenced the horse population of Ain, followed by Percherons and Anglo-Normans, which alternated as covering stallions until 1845. Two stallions in particular—the Anglo-Norman Zammor and the half-blood Héros—had a lasting influence on the local stock. Crossbreeding with Thoroughbred stallions eventually led to the development of the Ain half-breed.

Breeding was supported by local institutions such as the Châtillon-sur-Chalaronne racetrack, the dressage school at Villars-les-Dombes, and various fairs, including those held in Chalamont and Saint-André-de-Corcy, where premiums were awarded to encourage breeding. From the 1880s onward, breeding conditions improved with the introduction of fenced pastures—replacing the older practice of hobbling animals—and with advances in agriculture that enabled better feeding of the herd.

Between 1886 and 1913, the region maintained an average equine population of about 20,000 horses, of which 70% were half-breds. In 1910, the department of Ain had 20,630 horses, including 2,087 broodmares, 52 of which produced draft horses. Some locally bred horses were exported to Saône-et-Loire and Allier, where they were further developed to increase bone structure and body mass.

=== 20th century ===
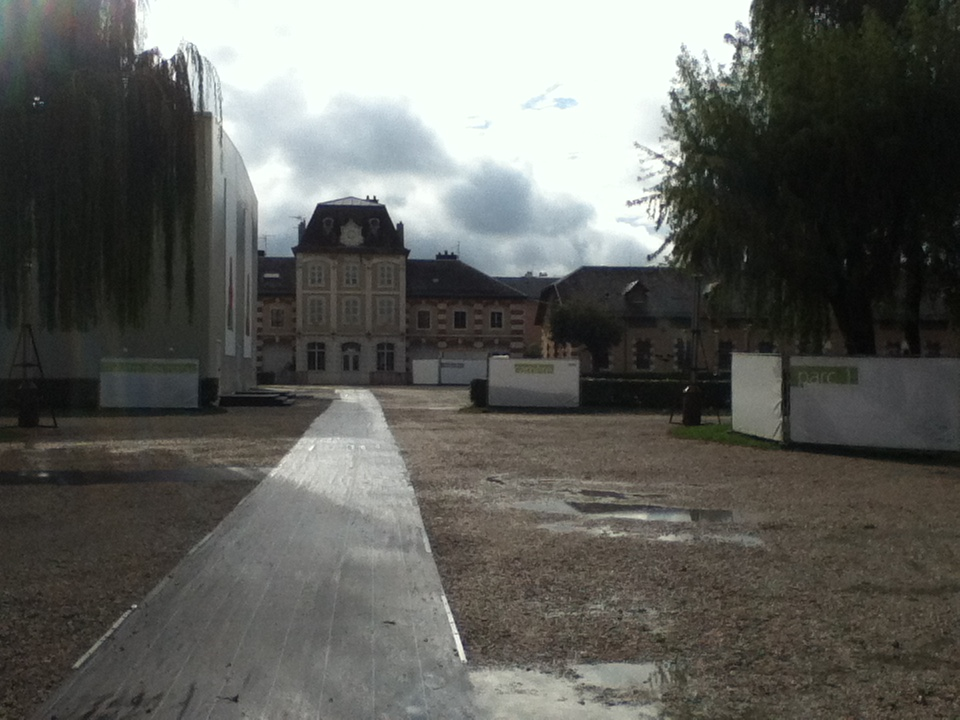
The Annecy National Stud Farm, responsible for managing the Dombes half-breed in the 20th century

Throughout the 20th century, the national stud at Annecy supervised the management of horses in the region. Purchases of breeding stallions were organized, but modernization in the military, transportation, and agriculture led to a reorganization of the sector. By 1914, half-bred horses intended for military remounts represented 71% of the equine population in the northwest Dombes. While local half-breds had become more robust, they were noted to have lost refinement and vitality.

Between 1925 and 1930, the best half-bred horses were allocated to military remounts, while less suitable animals were used for local draft work. The primary remaining market became the butcher trade, which encouraged the breeding of draft horses at the expense of half-breds. This trend was reinforced during the Second World War, when demand for draft horses increased.

With the modernization of transport, horse numbers declined significantly. By 1946, the population of half-breds in the Dombes was estimated at just 700 animals. The best horses were subsequently exported to Switzerland.

=== Legacy ===
Despite declining numbers, horses from the Dombes remained numerous enough to contribute to the creation of the Selle Français in 1958, a breed that unified various regional French half-breds. Although the Ain half-breed appeared destined to disappear like other regional types, limited breeding continued, and the best bloodlines of the Dombes were maintained into the 1960s and 1970s, following their integration into the Selle Français in 1958.

The development of the Selle Français, combined with the growth of leisure riding and equestrian sports, supported the continuation of breeding activity in the region.

The breeding of the Selle Français, which descends in part from the Ain half-bred, remains a traditional activity in the Dombes and Bresse. The local designation persisted as late as 1989. In 2012, the department of Ain had 14,000 horses and remained one of the leading centers of horse breeding in the Auvergne-Rhône-Alpes region.

== Uses ==
According to Bernadette Lizet, large-scale horse breeding was practiced in Bresse and the Dombes during the 19th century, with limited use of the animals for agricultural work. The Dombes horse was primarily bred for cavalry purposes, supplying remounts for the light cavalry in 1789 and continuing to be used by officers until the early 20th century. In 1947, most horses from this breeding were still intended for military use, while less suitable animals were employed for cart work by local tradespeople. Horses of the artillery type were also bred near Roanne.

== See also ==
- List of French horse breeds

== Bibliography ==
- Gayot, Eugène (1848). La France chevaline [Horse-loving France] (in French). Vol. 1. Imprimeurs-Unis.
- Merlino, Ch (1847). Mémoire sur la question de l'amélioration de la race chevaline en Dombes [Memoir on the question of improving the horse breed in Dombes] (in French). Damptin.
- Dubost, M (1859). Études agricoles sur la Dombes… : Première partie [Agricultural studies on the Dombes region: Part One] (in French). Dufour.
- O'Brien, L. E. P (1886). "Les chevaux du département de l'Ain" [Horses in the Ain department] (PDF). Journal de l'Ain (in French). ASIN B001BVALXI. Archived from the original (PDF) on 3 March 2016.
- de Comminges, Aimery (1910). Les races chevalines française et anglaises [French and English horse breeds] (in French). Ancienne Maison Milon.
- Société hippique française (1928). Adolphe le Goupy [The French half-blood horse: Charolais; Forez, Berry, and Dombes] (in French). Ancienne Maison Milon.
- Saint-Cyr, Jean (1934). L'élevage du cheval demi-sang de la Dombes [The breeding of the Dombes half-blood horse] (Thesis) (in French). Lyon.
- Trénard, Louis (1947). "L'évolution de l'économie agraire dans le nord-ouest de la Dombes depuis 1914" [The evolution of the agrarian economy in northwestern Dombes since 1914] (PDF). Les Études rhodaniennes (in French). 22 (1–4): 1–34. doi:10.3406/geoca.1947.5619. Archived from the original on 3 March 2016.
- Heritage of Dombes; Museum of the Ain Region (1991). Cheval en Dombes : élevage et pratiques [Horses in Dombes: breeding and practices] (in French). Musée des pays de l'Ain.
