= List of French horse breeds =

Map of regional origins of draft horse breeds and some other breeds across France

This is a list of some of the breeds of horse considered in France to be wholly or partly of French origin. Some may have complex or obscure histories, so inclusion here does not necessarily imply that a breed is predominantly or exclusively French.

== Extant breeds ==
- Ardennais
- AQPS
- Auvergne
- Auxois
- Barraquand (also known as Vercors)
- Boulonnais
- Breton
- Breton bidet
- Camargue
- Castillonnais
- Comtois
- Corlay
- Corsican
- French Anglo-Arab
- French Saddle Pony
- French Trotter
- Henson
- Landais
- Mérens
- Nivernais
- Norman Cob
- Percheron
- Poitevin
- Pottok
- Selle Français
- Trait du Nord (also known as Ardennais du Nord)

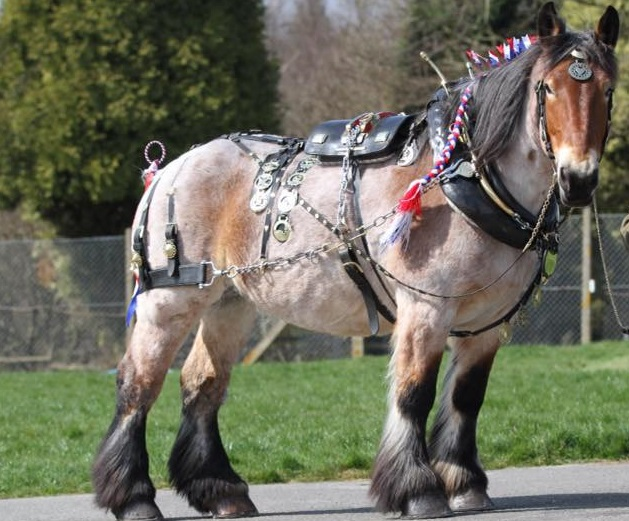
Ardennais

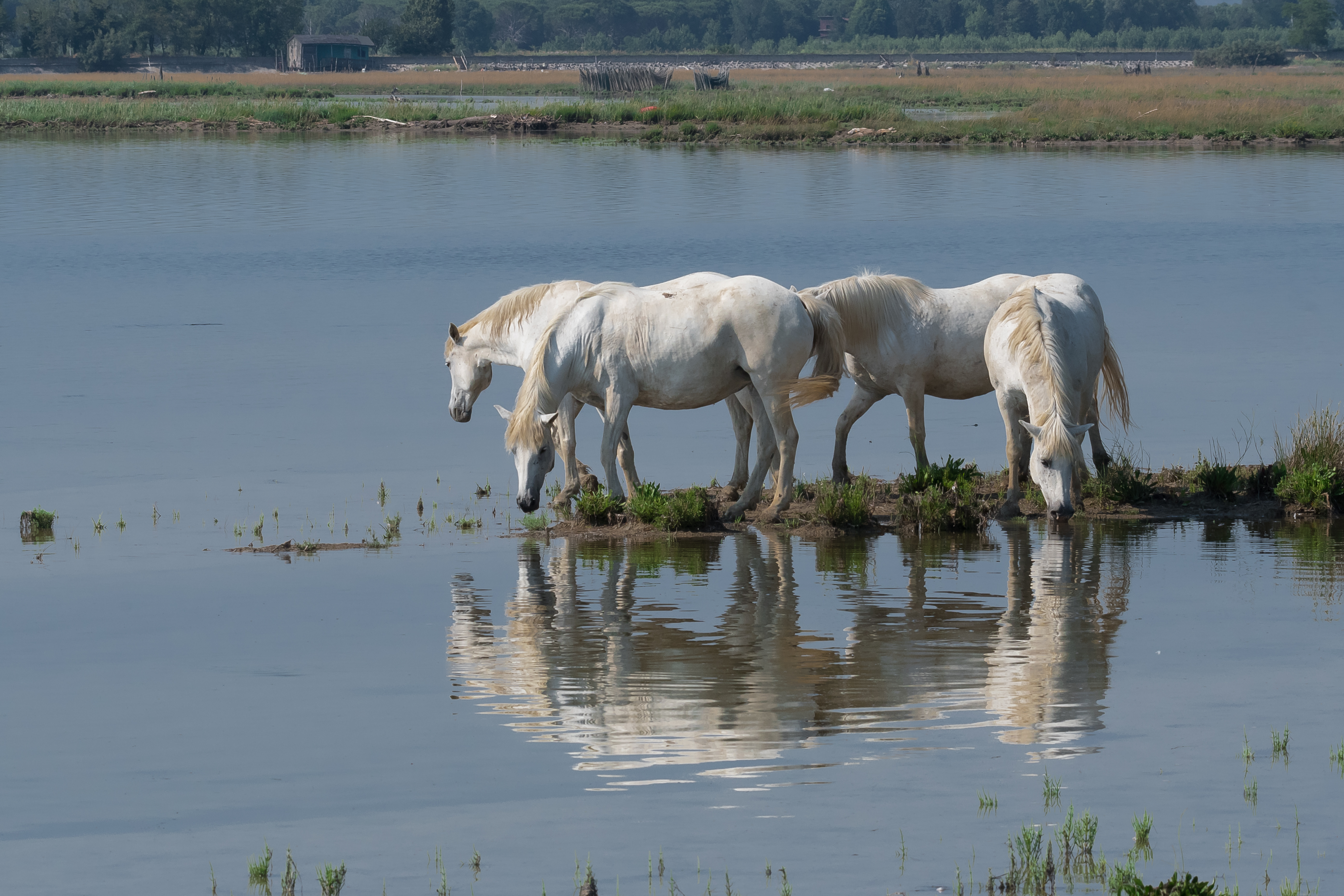
Camargue

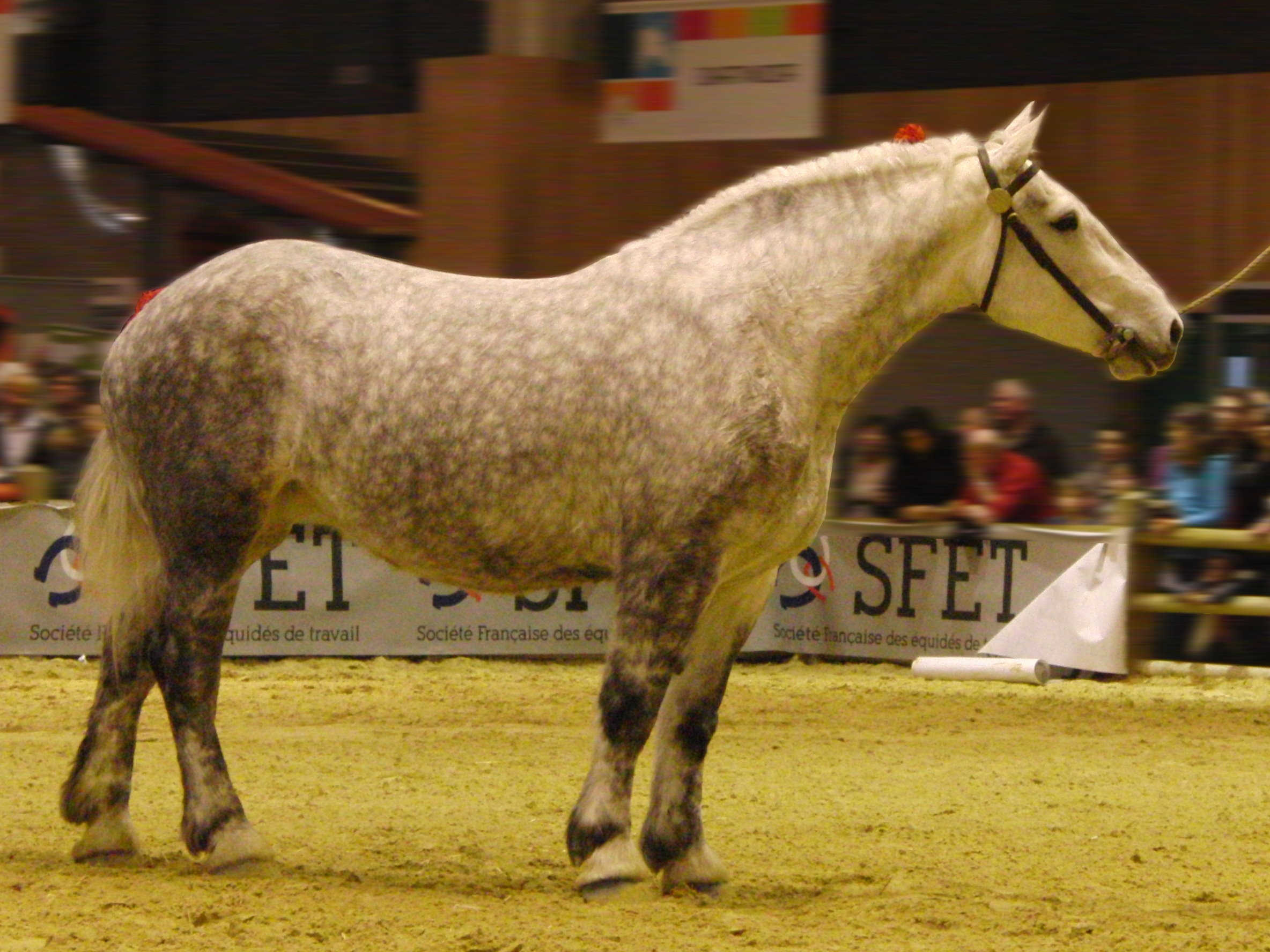
Percheron

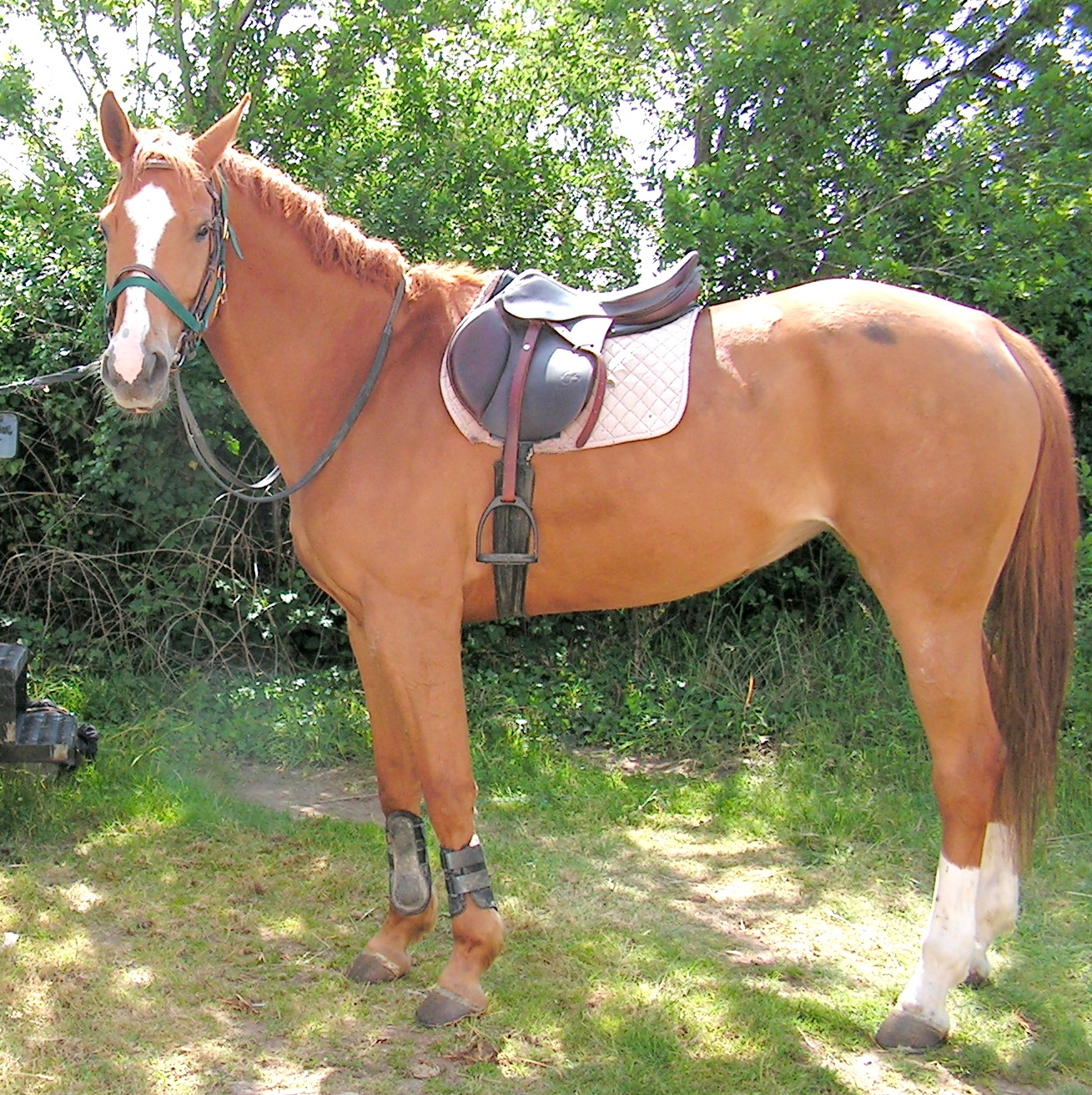
Selle Français

== Minor, suppressed and extinct breeds ==
† indicates extinct, and not merged into another breed

- Angevin (merged into Selle Français)
- Anglo-Normand
- Augeron (merged into Percheron)
- Berrichon (merged into Percheron)
- Bidet †
- Bourbonnais (merged into Percheron)
- Bourbourien (merged into Boulonnais)
- Bourguignon (ancestor of Charolais) †
- Bresse †
- Cauchois (merged into Boulonnais)
- Carrossier Normand (Norman coachhorse) †
- Centre-montagne (merged into Breton)
- Charentais (merged into Selle Français)
- Charolais (merged into Selle Français)
- Cotentin (Black coachhorse of Cotentin) †
- Demi-sang du Centre (merged into Selle Français)
- Dombes (merged into Selle Français)
- Haguard †
- Limousin †
- Lorrain †
- Mareyeur (merged into Boulonnais)
- Morvan †
- Navarrin †
- Petit Boulonnais (merged into Boulonnais)
- Postier Breton (merged into Breton)
- Trait Breton (merged into Breton)
- Trait de la Loire (merged into Percheron)
- Trait de Saône-et-Loire (merged into Percheron)
- Trait du Maine (merged into Percheron)
- Trait Picard (merged into Boulonnais)
- Vendéen (merged into Selle Français)

== Merges into Selle Français ==
In 1914, "half blood" (demi-sang) designated a cross between local mares and thoroughbreds. In 1958, many of the saddle horse breeds that were essentially half-blood were merged into the Selle Français registry, which has increasingly been geared toward sport horse types.

== Demi-sang de la Dombes ==
The Demi-sang de la Dombes (Dombes half-breed), Cheval de Bresse, and Demi-sang de l'Ain breeds are extinct riding horses native to eastern France (Dombes, Bresse and Ain), and were all absorbed together and then into the Selle Français breed.

== See also ==
- Haras Nationaux
- Horses in Brittany
- Horses in Normandy
- Horses in Breton culture
- Equestrianism in France
