= Barraquand horse =

French horse breed

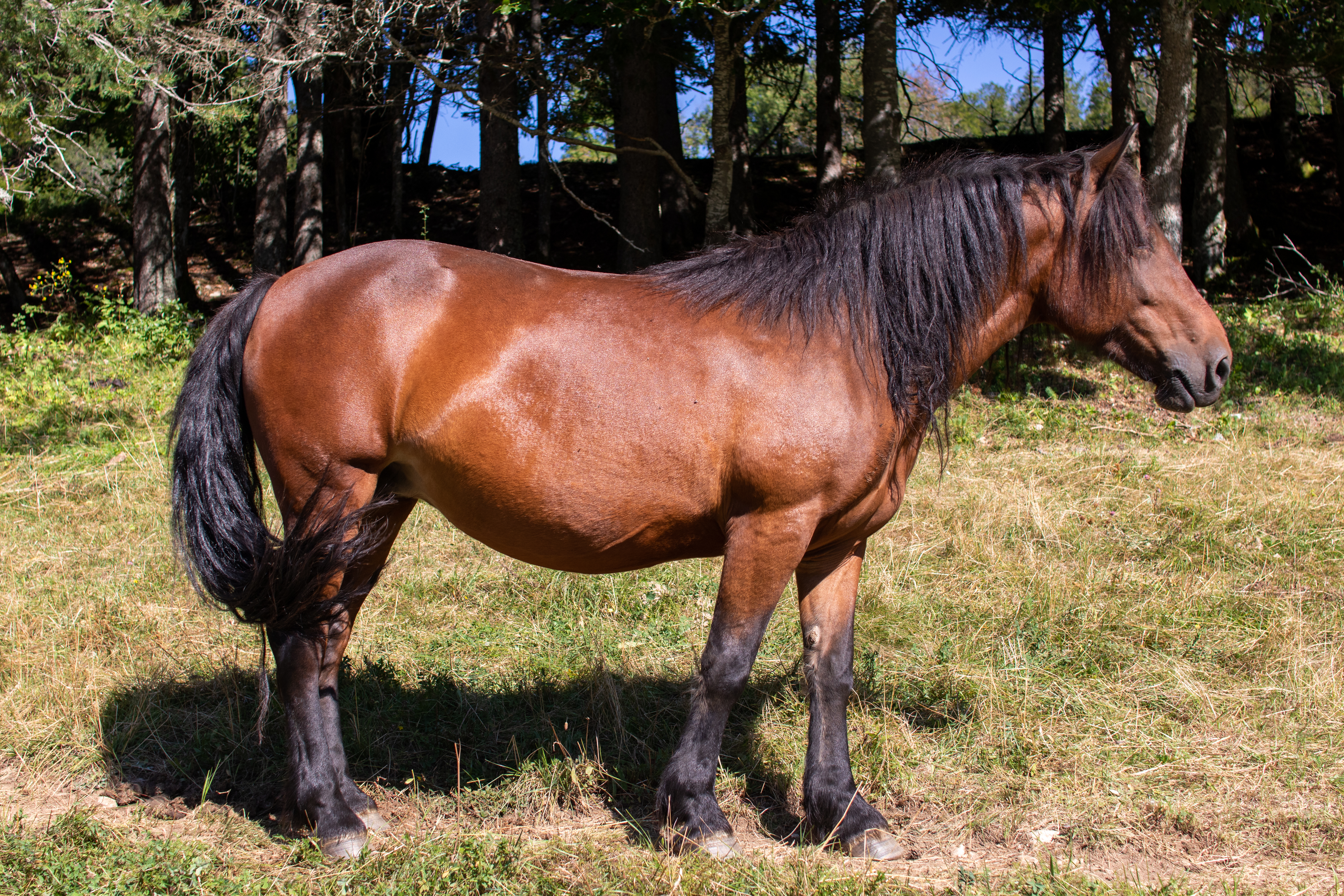

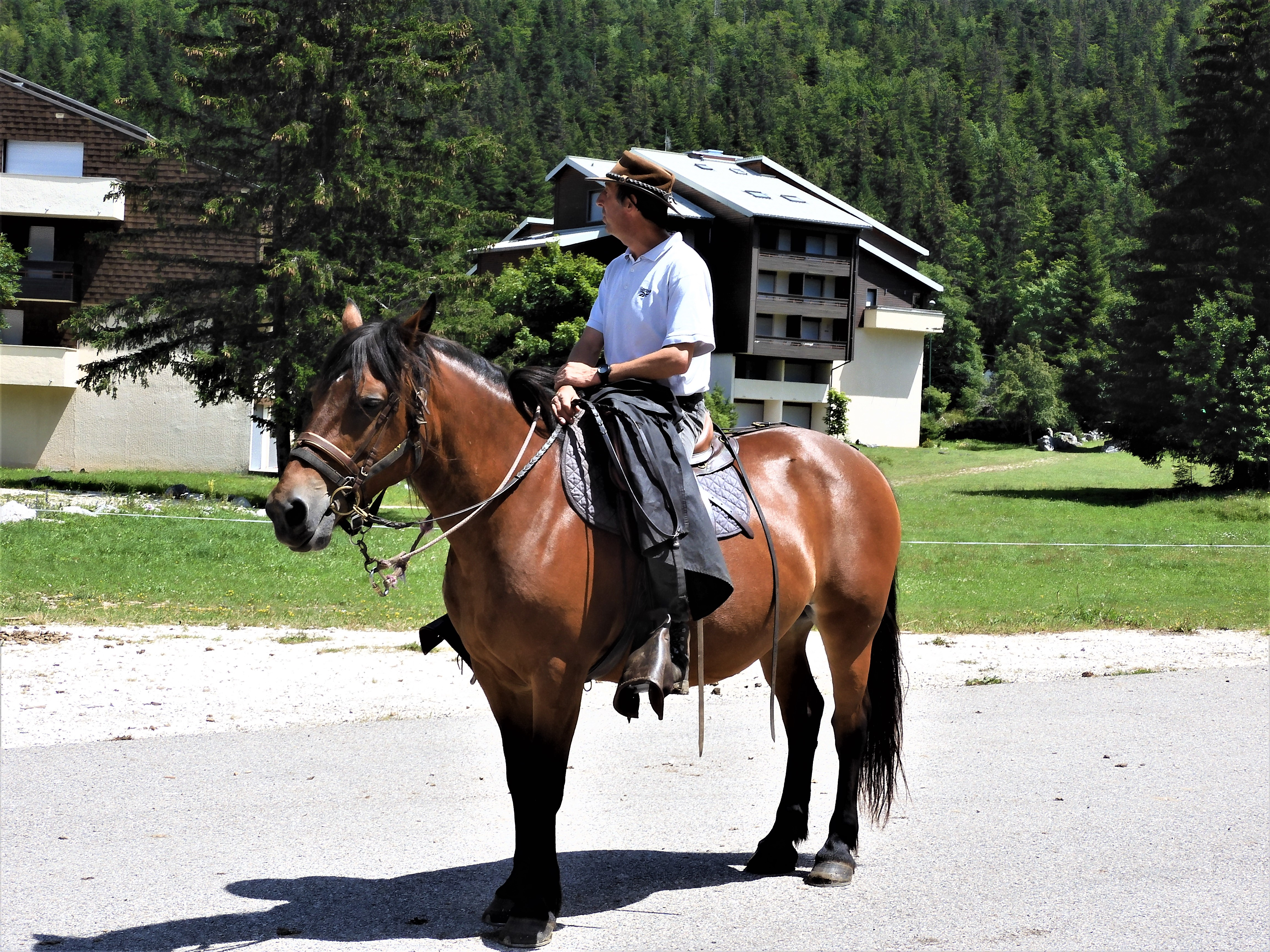
- Conservation status: Critically endangered
- Country of origin: Vercors Massif, France
- Use: Riding horse, horse-drawn vehicle and packhorse

Traits
- Weight: From 450 to 550 kg
- Height: About 1.50 m
- Color: Bay

The Barraquand horse is a French mountain horse breed that emerged from an ancient selection process in the Vercors Massif. It is believed to have originated from a small herd of animals cultivated by Christian monastic communities, particularly those associated with the Léoncel Abbey. Named after the Barraquand family, who developed their breeding practices from the late 19th century until the 1950s, primarily through the practice of transhumance. Following the bankruptcy of the original Barraquand breeding operation and the sale of a portion of their land in 1963, the breed was considered lost. However, it has been reconstituted since the 1990s through the efforts of various breeders and local institutions, notably the Barraquand family, the Vercors Regional Natural Park, and the Annecy National Stud.

The selection process undertaken by Jules Barraquand has led to a notable homogeneity in the size and type of these horses, which are modest in stature, typically bay in color, and renowned for their calm demeanor and resilience to harsh mountain climates. Historically used for transport and agricultural work, the Vercors de Barraquand horse is now primarily employed in equestrian tourism within its native region. As a critically endangered breed, its population was estimated at 215 individuals in 2015. The breed has been officially recognized by the French Ministry of Agriculture since 2017.

== Etymology and terminology ==
The official name designated on 18 July 2017 by the French Ministry of Agriculture for this horse breed is Cheval du Vercors de Barraquand. This designation is also recognized by the official database of the Food and Agriculture Organization of the United Nations, DAD-IS.

The customary use of this horse in the South of France has led to the Barraquand family's name being associated with the breed. Consequently, the terms cheval du Vercors and Cheval (de) Barraquand can be used interchangeably. CAB International's reference work (6th edition, 2020) refers to the breed as "Vercors", listing 'Barraquand' as a synonym; however, the Delachaux Guide does the opposite. Furthermore, La France agricole (2016 edition) refers to the breed under its official name of Cheval du Vercors de Barraquand.

== History ==
Various unverifiable hypotheses exist regarding the origins of the Barraquand horse, one of which suggests it may be a descendant of the Tarpan. The only academic source on this breed is a thesis by veterinary student Jean-Xavier Dussert, which focused on the Barraquand family's transhumance breeding practices and was defended in 1946, subsequently published the following year.

=== Origins ===
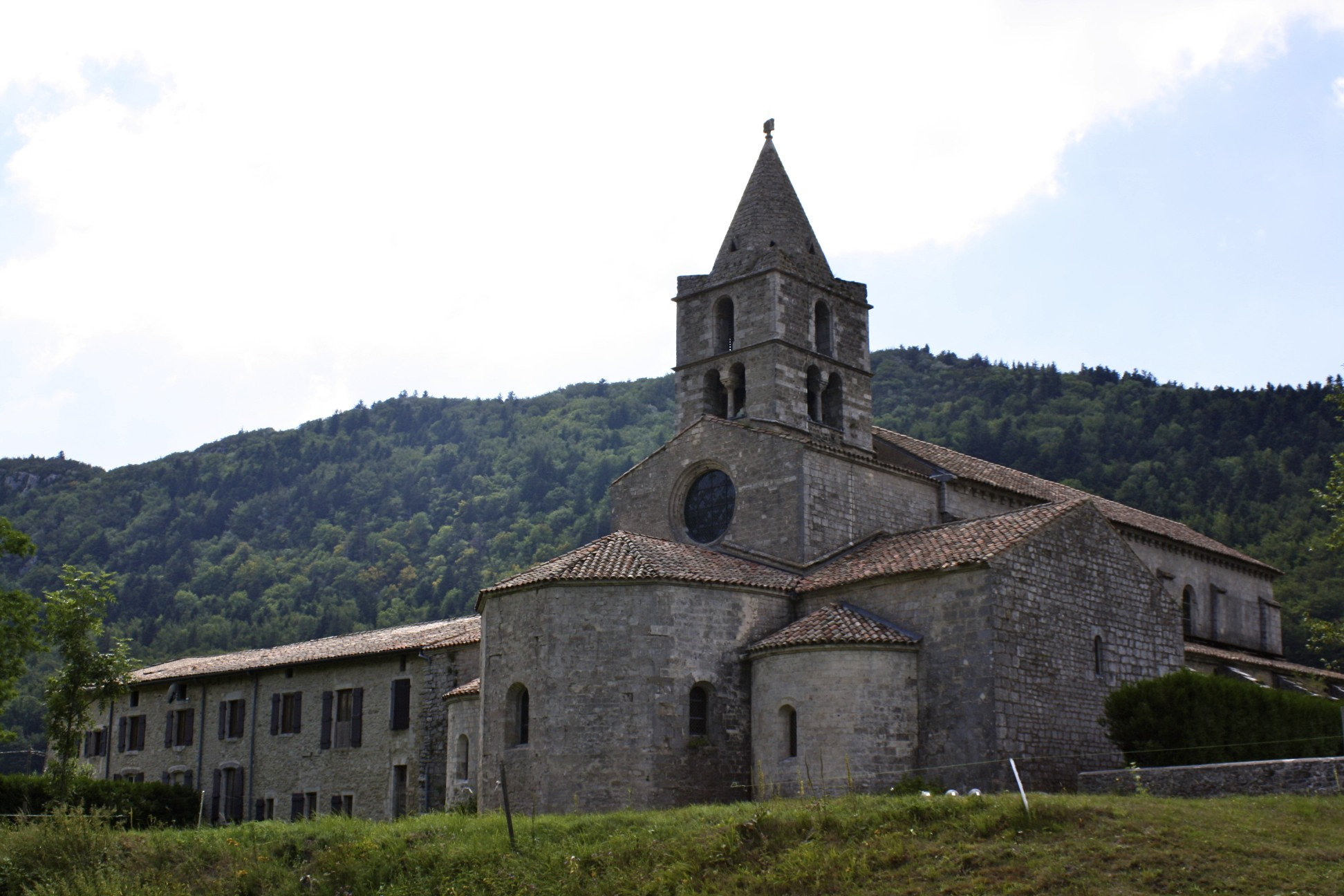
The Léoncel abbey, whose monastic communities probably contributed to the selection of the breed.

The history of the Vercors Massif has been significantly influenced by the establishment of Christian monastic communities engaged in livestock breeding and agriculture since the Middle Ages. It is likely that these communities contributed to the selection of the ancestors of the current local horse breed. In 1760, Dom Périer, prior of the Abbey of Léoncel and credited with the first written mention of this breed, proposed the establishment of a stud farm on the Ambel plateau, but his request was denied due to his controversial history deforestation. According to a brochure from the Barraquand family for the Vercors horse association, it was stated that "since time immemorial, the Vercors mountains had been home to a breed of stocky, hardy horses perfectly adapted to the rugged mountain terrain and harsh climate".

During this period, horses were in short supply in the region and were primarily used for transport, fieldwork, and meat production.

Although the number of horses in Treschenu-Creyers increased significantly between 1836 and 1921—accompanied by a decrease in the number of donkeys and mules— by the end of the 19th century, small mountain horses began to decline due to competition from heavy draft breeds more commonly used in the plains. This decline was exacerbated by a decrease in farming activities, driven by the harsh climate and a growing preference for cattle breeding, which proved more profitable.

=== Barraquand family influence ===
The breed experienced significant growth at the end of the 19th century, with further development occurring in the first half of the 20th century under the leadership of the Barraquand family, breeders from the Vercors region who owned land in what is now the commune of Omblèze. Jules Barraquand is particularly recognized as the founder of the breed. In 1894, at the age of fourteen, he established his own herd by selecting a stallion and six local mares. Rigorous selection practices contributed to the homogenization of the horses' characteristics.

In the winter of 1908, Jules Barraquand began transhumance, guiding hundreds of horses across the south of France along the Rhone valley, leaving the summer pastures to spend the winter in the Crau. By 1914, his effective management had resulted in a herd that included 200 broodmares and eight stallions approved by the National Stud Farms, solidifying the breed's association with his name.

The onset of World War I caused a temporary slowdown in breeding activities. However, post-war, breeding resumed, with farmers and market gardeners in the Vercors and southern regions adopting this economical horse for their small-scale farm work. The so-called "Barraquand horses" began to spread to farms in villages along the transhumance route. This period of agricultural prosperity enabled the Barraquand family to acquire nearly 800 hectares of land near Arles and in the Vercors, at Ambel. The transhumance from the Font d'Urle and Ambel lands to the plains of the Southern regions, involving the passage of dozens of bais horses along the Rhone valley, served as an effective means of reaching potential buyers and users, leaving a lasting impression on local communities. These horses play an important role in the local economy.

=== Decline ===
World War II significantly impacted Barraquand breeding. Despite this, the horses' transhumance captured the attention of journalist Merry Bromberger, who featured them in an article for Voici la France in July 1941. The lands of Fond d'Urle and Ambel were occupied by individuals evading compulsory labor, and the farm buildings were set ablaze by German forces. Following the death of Jules Barraquand, his son Frédéric struggled to maintain the family business, as the farm in Ambel had been destroyed and the horses requisitioned and dispersed by the Germans.

This remaining population of approximately 150 horses drew the interest of veterinary student Jean-Xavier Dussert. After observing a report on their transhumance, he dedicated his thesis to the breed, which he defended in 1946, proposing the development of a genuine "alpine" breed.

In the 1950s, the horse trade declined with the mechanization of agriculture. The last transhumance took place in 1954. The Barraquand family's breeding operation went into deficit, and sales collapsed in the late 1950s. Frédéric Barraquand ultimately sold his land and disbanded the farm in 1963. With no traceability of the horses, the breed was considered extinct.

=== Safeguarding ===
At the end of the 20th century, the Barraquand horse began to attract renewed attention, largely due to the efforts of enthusiasts such as Jean-Louis Barraquand, the grandson of Jules Barraquand. He initiated the rebuilding of the herd on his family farm in Arles, starting with mares and a stallion, beginning in either 1988 or 1994, and sought to revive the practice of transhumance. This effort was supported by Vercors equestrian farms and the Vercors Regional Natural Park, which, in collaboration with the Annecy National Stud, aimed to restore the Barraquand horse alongside the conservation of Villard-de-Lans cattle. By 1997, 51 horses (including 3 stallions, 27 broodmares and 21 foals) were identified as conforming to the breed type.

A safeguarding program was launched in 1995, utilizing the horses of the Barraquand family in the Crau region as the foundation stock. An association dedicated to the preservation of the Barraquand horse breed was established in February of that year under French law (1901), initially comprising around ten members, in collaboration with the Association pour la promotion des agriculteurs du parc du Vercors (Association for the Promotion of Farmers in the Vercors Park). The first foals in this Park-funded breeding program were born in 1996. Another association, the Association française des éleveurs du cheval Barraquand (French association of Barraquand horse breeders), was created in 2001 (according to the official website) or 2006 (according to documents registered with the prefecture) in Arles, due to differences of opinion between breeders involved in the revival of this horse. It was dissolved in 2015.

The breeders aim to achieve official recognition of the breed by the National Stud Farms (now known as the Institut français du cheval et de l'équitation, IFCE), which is crucial for the breed's continued existence. The relaxation of breed specifications in 2014, followed by the merger of the two associations representing the Vercors horse and the Barraquand horse into a single entity—the Association nationale du cheval du Vercors de Barraquand—facilitated this recognition. The Barraquand horse was recognized by decree of the French Ministry of Agriculture on 18 July 2017, as a local breed.

André Barbara, national delegate for territorial horse breeds at the IFCE, worked on defining the breed standard by comparing horses from the Vercors region with those from the Crau, noting their phenotypic similarities. The studbook contains data on six generations of horses, listing between 250 and 300 animals as of 2017. The breed was represented at the Bleu du Vercors festival in Sassenage in August 2015, and for the first time at the Paris International Agricultural Show in February 2018, featuring the eight-year-old stallion Athos and the mare Vicky. In July 2019, the breed received authorization to participate in the Route Eiffel, an urban equestrian ride to Paris, which is open to horse breeds from French territory.

== Description ==
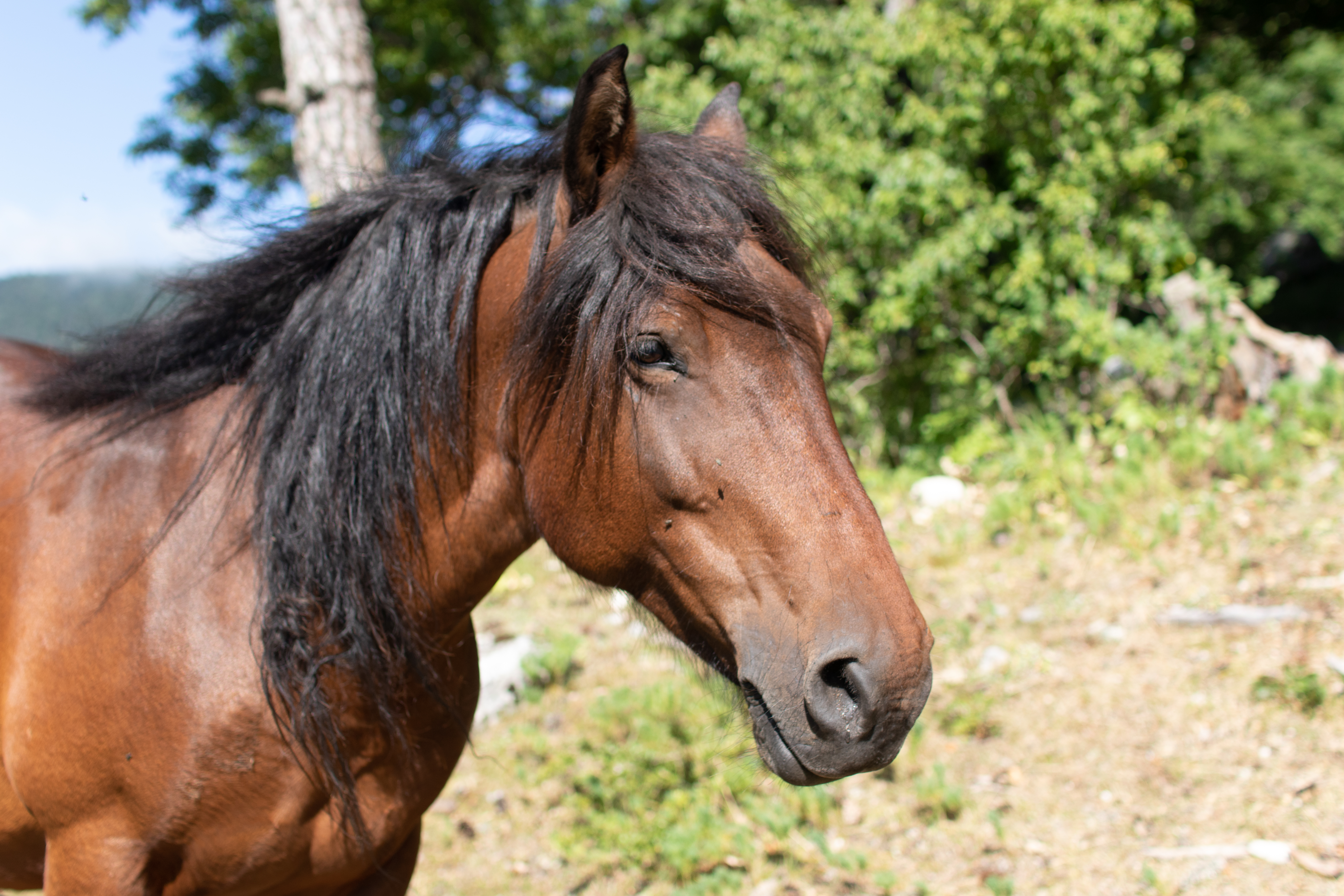
Head of a Barraquand horse

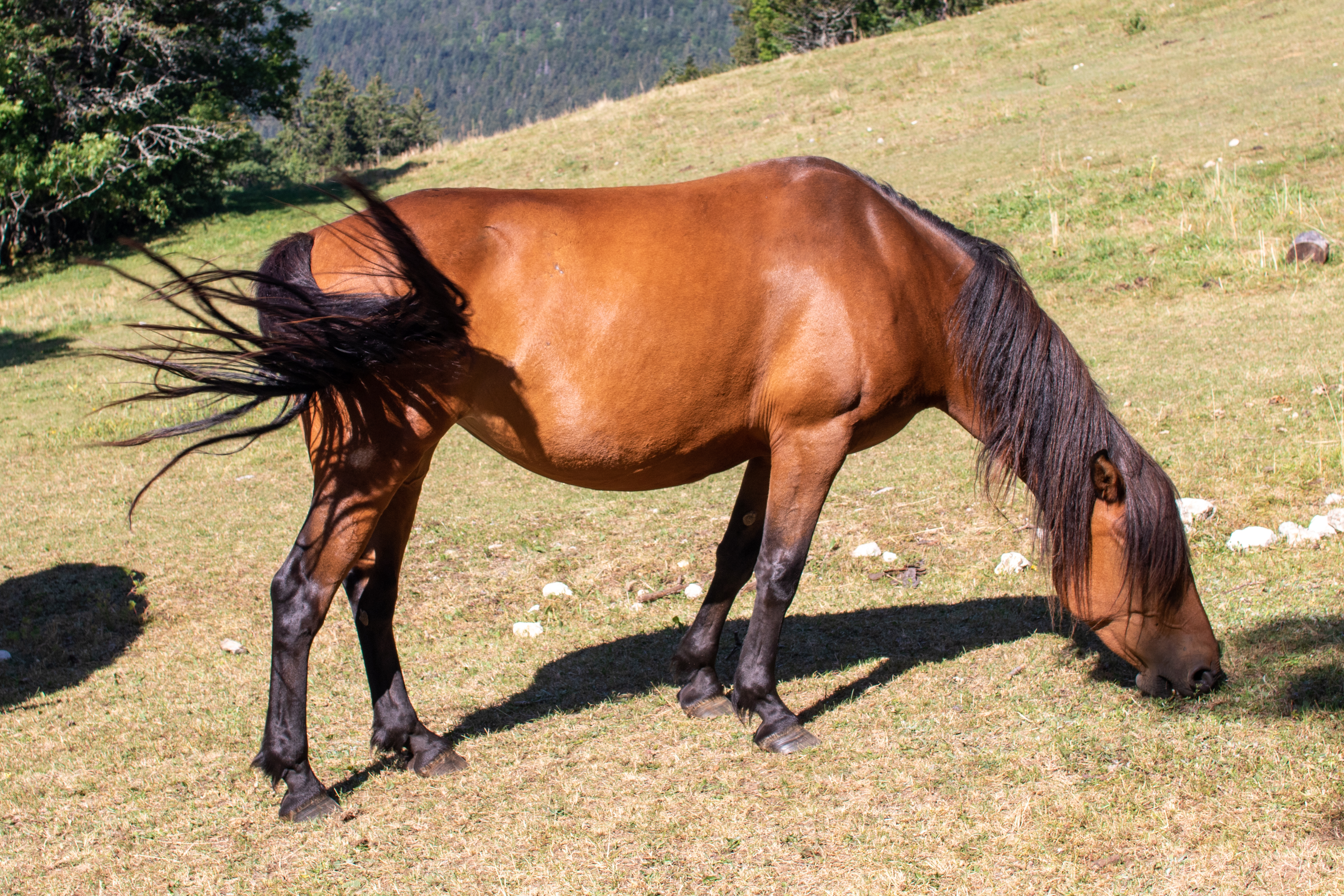
Brood mare

The breed standard for the Barraquand horse was officially validated by a breeding commission on 10 December 2015. This breed closely resembles the Auvergne horse due to historical exchanges of breeding stock, to the extent that some specialists propose classifying it as a type of the latter breed. Additionally, it shares similarities with the Mérens and Castillonnais horses.

=== Height and weight ===
According to breeders, the ideal height for the Barraquand horse is between 1.45 and 1.55 meters, with an average height of 1.50 meters and a weight ranging from 400 to 500 kg. The official FAO database, DAD-IS, lists an average height of 1.50 meters with a median weight of 500 kg. Historical records from the Barraquand family's era indicate a slightly greater height and weight.

=== Morphology ===
The Barraquand horse presents a solid, well-built appearance without being heavy, exhibiting a polymorphous type that varies from saddle horse to light draft horse. Despite this variability of type, the horses present a remarkable phenotypic homogeneity.

The head is expressive and proportionate, relatively small with a broad forehead, a straight nasal bridge, and a striking fawn-colored eye. The nostrils are supple and broad; the head is topped by small ears, ideally crescent-shaped, and well furnished with hair on the inside.

The head is set lightly, complemented by a muscular neck that is "correctly oriented" (not resembling a stag neck). According to Sylvain Piltant, president of the Breed Association, the long, wavy manes and tails help the horses withstand the elements and navigate through snow without getting caught in crevices. Double manes are considered desirable, and the hair should be thin and silky.

The withers are slightly protruding. The chest is deep and open, the shoulders long, sloping and muscular; the back and loins are short, broad and powerful, well supported. The topline is noted for its quality, featuring a very strong loinset. The flanks are full and deep, and the rump is bouncy, powerful, long, wide, and muscular, with a high-set tail that is slightly sloping. Legs are well jointed, lean, and muscular, solid, with short canons, and feathered. The hooves are relatively small but very robust.

=== Coat ===
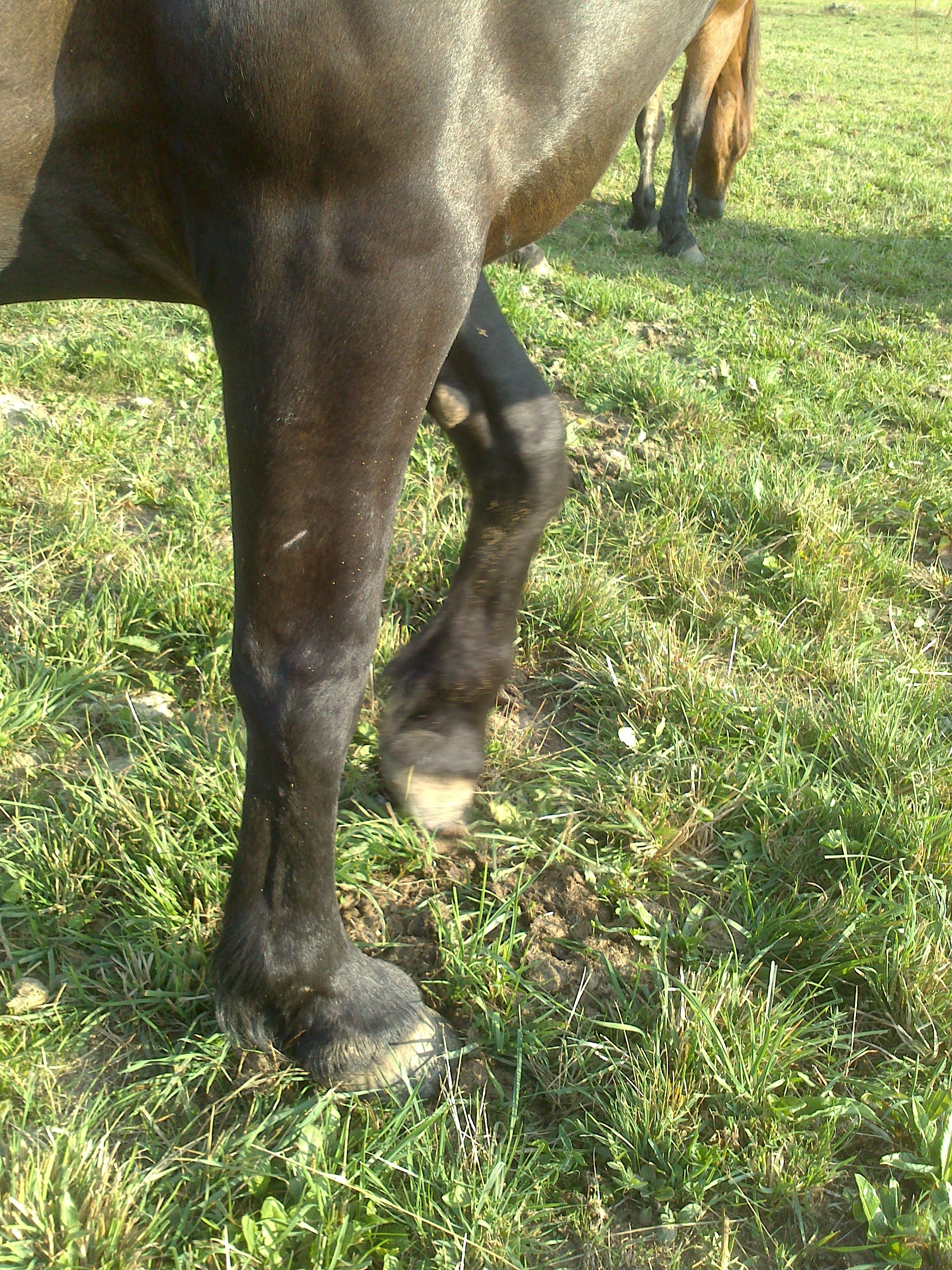
Detail of the feathered and chestnut limbs without markings, typical of mountain horses.

The Barraquand horse is characterized by a distinctive dark coat in all shades of bay. The presence of barnacles or any other white markings on the limbs is considered disqualifying. While the breed may have a few small markings on the head, these must not extend below the lower eye line. The tip of the nose should be gray or beige, with a fox nose (beige discoloration) accepted.

Breeder Marion Forestier justifies the search for horses without white markings by their resistance to "sunburn on bare highlands". Black markings on the limbs are highly desirable, and brindle (marbled) limbs are appreciated, as well as a combination of black and fawn manes. The hooves have black horns.

=== Temperament and welfare ===
Known for their strength and docility, Barraquand horses are typically raised in an extensive, transhumant system, alternating between winter and summer pastures in the open air throughout the year. This approach allows foals to exercise on uneven terrain, fostering their sure-footedness. The breed is sociable, hardy, and highly resistant, particularly in terms of feeding, making them well-suited to the mountain climate of their region. Historically, foals born in the wild were lassoed and easily trained, thanks to their naturally sociable character. Gaits are supple and energetic.

=== Selection ===
The breed is managed by the Association nationale du cheval du Vercors de Barraquand, chaired by Sylvain Piltant, who submitted the application for recognition to the French Ministry of Agriculture. The primary aim of the selection process is to preserve the breed's hardiness while also striving for a certain elegance in form and a pleasant temperament. To achieve this, herd life is encouraged to ensure the horses' balance and sociability.

In 2019, horses were to be entered in the breed's studbook based on their compliance with established standards. The main selection constraint is consanguinity management.

== Usage ==
Originally used for ploughing, transporting, and other agricultural and forestry work, the Barraquand horse is increasingly being utilized as a saddle horse for leisure activities and trail riding. It is a versatile breed; like many of Europe's "dual-purpose" mountain horses, it can serve as a riding horse, a horse-drawn vehicle, or a packhorse.

Breeders promote the Barraquand horse for trail riding in its native Vercors mountains, where it meets the demands of the equestrian tourism sector and benefits from a hoof structure well-suited to the terrain. The use of a local breed enhances commercial viability and safety, while also fostering a sense of regional identity among tourists.

This horse is also suitable for combined driving, TREC (Techniques de Randonnée Équestre de Compétition), and skijoring, all of which require horses that are comfortable in cold conditions. According to Cheval Magazine, the Barraquand horse serves as a good introduction to sport riding, enabling riders to learn show jumping and eventing up to Club level, which is the entry-level competition in the French system.

In addition, the Barraquand horse can be extensively bred to assist with cattle or sheep management, proving effective in managing mountain areas due to its lighter weight compared to draft horses, which minimizes soil damage from trampling. The breed association also recommends them for skidding timber. The pulling of taxi-sleds in ski resorts in winter is mentioned as a possible outlet.

As of 2012, most horses born in the breeding program were intended for breeding purposes or were acquired by riding schools, while the driving aspect remained underdeveloped.

== Breed distribution ==
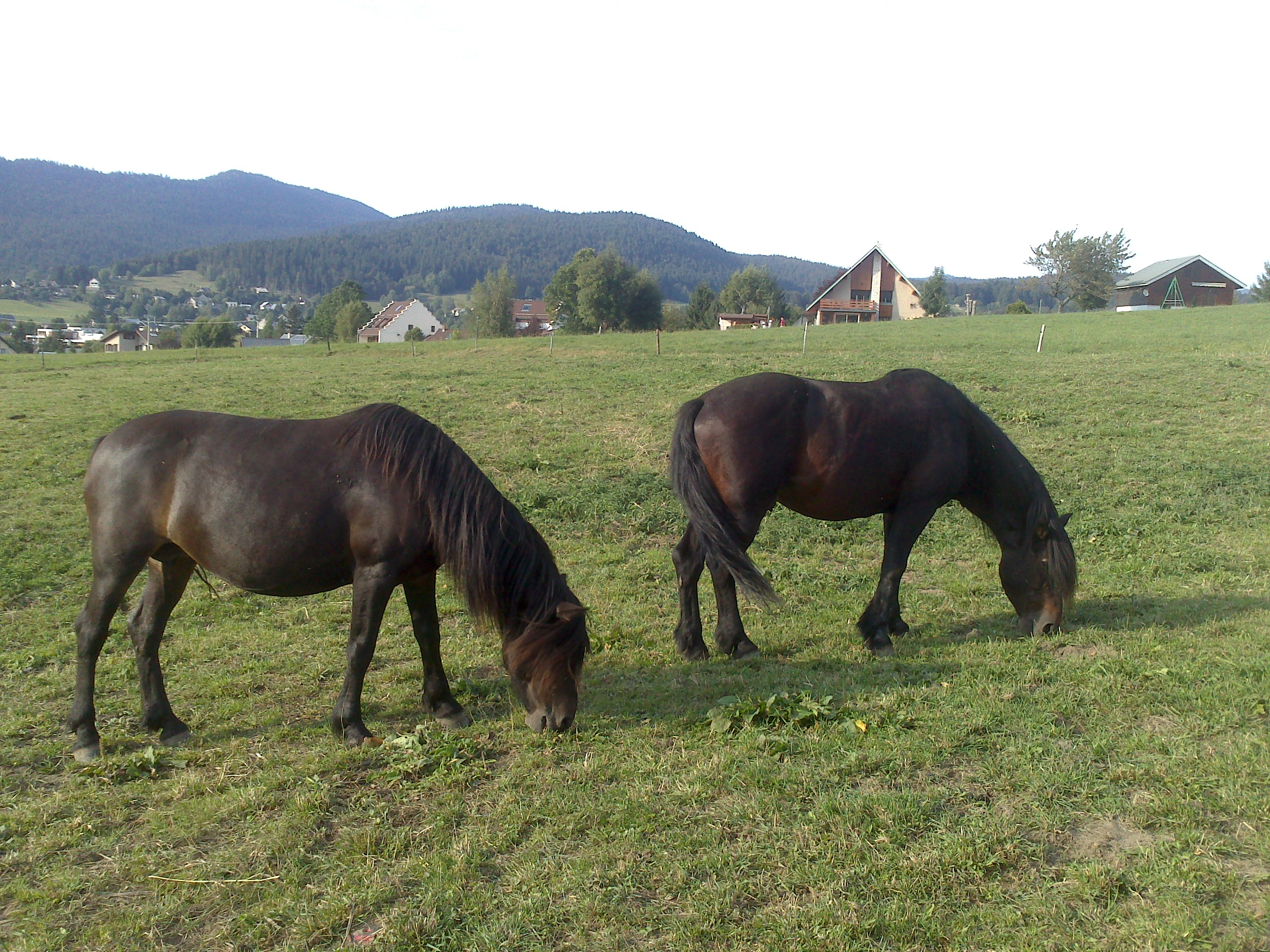
The Vercors mountains, the breed's historic biotope.

The DAD-IS classifies Barraquand horses as one of France's native local horse breeds, which is critically endangered and subject to on-site protection measures as of 2020. In 2023, the French National Research Institute for Agriculture, Food and the Environment (INRAE) identified the breed as threatened with extinction.

As one of the rarest and least known French horse breeds, the Barraquand horse is unique in having two primary geographical cradles: the Vercors plateau and the Crau plain, due to the practice of transhumance between these two biotopes. The Vercors Massif region, located in the French departments of Drôme and Isère, considers this breed a part of its regional heritage, as it is the only horse breed endemic to the former French region of Rhone-Alpes. The national breed competition is held every year in Corrençon-en-Vercors. In addition to the French national association of breed, the Vercors Regional Natural Park and the Association pour la Promotion des Agriculteurs du Parc (Association for the Promotion of Farmers in the Park) are taking action to preserve and promote this local breed.

In 2010, an article by journalist Marion Frison for Isère Magazine reported that there were just over a hundred Barraquand horses and around ten active breeders. In 2014, the Guide Delachaux estimated the herd at 150 horses, also involving about a dozen breeders. Data from DAD-IS indicated a herd of 215 horses in 2015; figures collected by Amélie Tsaag Valren from the breed association at the end of 2015 suggested approximately 200 individuals, highlighting the challenges in obtaining reliable statistics prior to the breed's official recognition.

All births of horses belonging to this breed have been registered since 1996, totaling 323 births between 1996 and 2017. In 2019, according to an article by Ariane Fornia, around twenty foals eligible for inclusion in the Barraquand horse studbook were born.

Estimated growth for Barraquand horse herd
Year	2010	2013	2014	2015	2017	2019
Horse quantity	~100		~150	200 or 215	206	
Foal births		8	10	11	17	~20

== In culture ==
The breed was featured on the French TV channel France 3 on 30 January 2019, in the documentary program Des racines et des ailes, as part of the episode "Passion patrimoine: Sur les sentiers du Dauphiné".

Writer and poet Ahmed Kalouaz cited Barraquand horse in his novel Sur le bout de la langue, published in August 2019.

== See also ==
- Horse breeding in France
- List of French horse breeds
