= Haguard horse =

Bidet poney from France

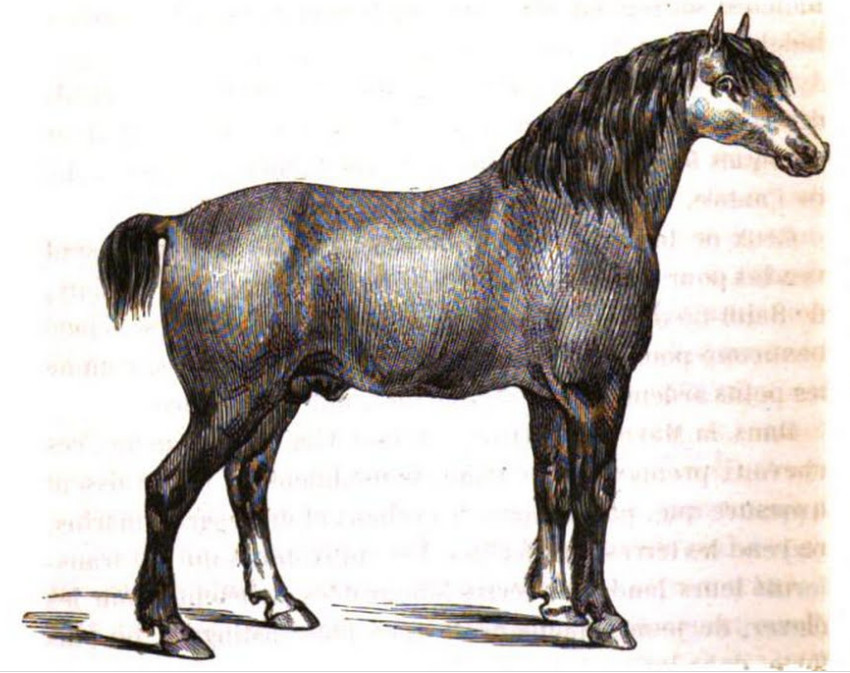
- Gaited horse of La Hague, 1857
- Country of origin: La Hague, France
- Use: Racing, riding and packing

Traits
- Height: 1.44–1.48 m
- Color: Generally dark with leg markings, sometimes gray possible
- Color: Generally dark with leg markings, sometimes gray possible

Haguard horse, also known as the Hague pony or bidet de la Hague, is a breed of bidet horse native to the natural region of La Hague, in the Manche in Normandy.

Used as a packhorse, saddle horse and by the postal services, this little horse is known for its particular hereditary gait, the pas relevé. It won many trotting races near Cherbourg, notably in 1835 and 1836. Formerly bred in the hilly, marshy areas of the Cherbourg, Valognes and Coutances arrondissements, the Haguard became extinct as a result of road improvements and cross-breeding with Thoroughbreds and racing trotters. A small population was probably transferred to the Mayenne region, helping to create the French saddle pony in the 1970s.

== Origin of name ==
The information available on this extinct horse breed is dated. The breed is known as 'Haguard', 'bidet de la Hague', and 'gaited horse', according to Jean-Henri Magne. However, zootechnicians Alexandre-Bernard Vallon and Paul Diffloth dissociate the 'gaited bidet' from the 'Hague pony', both of which they list as part of the Cotentin horse breeds, along with the black carrossier and the passeur. The gaited bidet, or Norman letter carrier, is described by Vallon as being larger in stature.

== Characteristics ==
Smaller than other Norman horses, Haguards are described as "short, small, nervous, tireless, hard and solid as the granite on which they were bred":

"Here is the Hague pony, as hard as the granite of the Tourlaville dunes."

— Éphrem Houël, Histoire du cheval chez tous les peuples de la terre.

Bernadette Lizet describes them as ponies, and Daniel Roche as bidets. Alexandre-Bernard Vallon attributes an average height of 1.44 m to 1.48 m to them.

The head is straight and slightly cambered, with a thick muzzle, short, broad forehead and open nostrils, small ears and large eyes. The neck is short and strong. Thick withers, open chest.The body is full, the back short and supported, the rump strong, the loins broad and well attached. Legs are strong and clean, with wide cannons and short pasterns. The hooves are ample. The manes are strong and abundant, the skin hard.

Coat is generally dark, with white leg markings, but gray is possible.

These horses are reputed to be sober and energetic, vigorous and hardy. They are particularly adept on stony paths. According to Magne, they have a particular gait, called pas relevé, characterized by a resemblance to the trot, but in four beats. This gait is hereditary in Hague horses, and breeders who wish to preserve it are careful to exclude trotting animals from breeding.

== Breed history ==
According to geographer Armand Frémont, the Haguard is one of Normandy's most famous, even legendary, breeds. Jean-Henri Magne (1857) describes these horses as "the most renowned of the Norman bidets".

The particular biotope of the Hague has favored the emergence of several specific animal breeds. However, local horses are little known to hippologists. An Arab or Turkish origin has been suggested, or at least an ancestry from the oriental horse, due to morphological convergence. The biotope of these ponies is an exception among French coastal horse breeds: most of them are large. The Hague horse is bred alongside much larger Normandy horses.

According to Armand Frémont, these small horses were very popular until the early 19th century for travel in the Normandy bocage, and were reputed to be vigorous.

In 1835, Mr Le Magnen, a wine merchant in Cherbourg, wanted to attract English customers to the town by creating a lively atmosphere with the "bidets". He approached mayor Nicolas Noël-Agnès, and received help from Éphrem Houël, who organized trotting and galloping races, notably on 25 and 26 September 1836.

The extinction of the breed was reported in Le Pilote du Calvados of 22 February 1835. In the 1840s, the Hague horse was crossed with galloping horses. According to M. Mazure, crossing Hague mares with trotters produces "half-breeds that sometimes amble, sometimes trot, but most often a broken amble, the traquenard. It is through training that we get them used to the raised walk, so that they never walk like animals in which this gait is natural, hereditary". In the 1860s, according to Eugène Gayot, the Hague breed tended to merge with other Norman horse breeds, due to crossbreeding with the Thoroughbred. Gayot was in favor of this crossbreeding: "The little Hague breed, losing its practical usefulness every day, was in danger of dying out instead of being revived by its own qualities in a new form, better suited to the new demands of the consumer. It was a question of encouraging the transformation of this breed, of retaining in the breed that was to be established on its ruins all that had made its usefulness and reputation; it was a question, after a long halt, of getting back on track and gradually, without rushing into anything, managing to grow, to develop the form without losing anything of the substance".

In his study of L'Élevage en Normandie (2013), Armand Frémont dates the extinction of the Hague horse to the mid-1850s, and links it to the improvement of roads and paths, rendering the saddle and pack horse useless. In 1857, Magne wrote that "few gaited horses are produced these days, and their price has risen considerably. Today, they are generally used in the country".

However, the survival of a small population of 'Cotentin ponies' until the 1960s–1970s is mentioned by Yvan de Curraize, former director of the French Pony Breeders' Federation, and author and journalist Lætitia Bataille. According to these sources, the last representatives of this breed, transferred from Cotentin to Mayenne for use in gallop races, contributed to the formation of the French saddle pony.

== Usage ==
Although considered too small for light cavalry, these horses were sometimes big enough for hussars (1.46 to 1.50 m).

They were used in trotting races and for heavy-duty work, particularly in the pack. They were also used by the horse mail service and for trotting traction work. Horses from the Hague took part in the trotting races created by Éphrem Houël near Cherbourg; they distinguished themselves there in 1835, notably through the victory of the gray 'Haguard', ridden by his owner Mr. Marie, then by Auguste Mayer, for his new owner Mr. Pestre, on 25 September 1836. Haguard won the 200-franc prize at the age of 7. At the time of their creation, these races were reserved exclusively for local horses: "The Cherbourg races got off to the best possible start; unfortunately, their progress has not been as noticeable as we would have wished: this is due to the fact that we wanted to act on a circle that was too narrow, by admitting only local horses to the races [...] Let's hope that broader and more fruitful ideas will breathe new life into these races, and that every year crowds will flock to the Cherbourg shore, facing the great sea, applauding the light cavales of the Val de Cérès and the vigorous ponies of the Hague hills".

According to Magne, Hague horses are "essentially suited to saddle service, despite their jerky gait". They don't walk very fast, but can cover long distances, on the order of 60 to 80 kilometers for several days at a time. They are employed by cattle merchants and graziers.

== Breed distribution ==
The breed is native to the northwest of the Cotentin Peninsula, a relatively mountainous and marshy area. According to Jean-Henri Magne and Alexandre-Bernard Vallon, bidets de la Manche are mainly bred in the arrondissements of Cherbourg, Valognes and Coutances. The breed was sold at various horse fairs, notably Lessay in the 1860s.

The Hague pony was exported to Charolais, Auvergne, Central France and England.

In his novel Le Baptême du sang, Louis Énault cites "a small white marble group depicting a child of about ten years of age, astride one of these Hague ponies, about the size of those which, more famous but no more beautiful, graze a rare and salty grass on the hills of Shetland, Orkney or the Hebrides, before being used as mounts by the young aristocracy of the Trois-Royaumes".

== See also ==
- List of French horse breeds
- Horse breeding in France

== Bibliography ==
- Magne, Jean-Henri (1857). Hygiène vétérinaire appliquée : étude de nos races d'animaux domestiques et des moyens de les améliorer (in French). Vol. 1 (2nd ed.). Labe.
- Au Bureau du journal (1849). "Des chevaux de La Hague". Journal des haras des chasses et des courses de chevaux, recueil périodique consacre a l'étude du cheval, à son éducation (in French). Vol. 47.
- M., A. (1835). "Variétés". Journal des haras, chasses, et courses de chevaux, des progrès des sciences zooïatriques et de médecine comparée (in French). Vol. 2. Parent.
- Vallon, Alexandre-Bernard (1880). Cours d'Hippologie a l'usage de Mm. les officiers de l'armée, de Mm. les officiers des haras, les vétérinaires, les agriculteurs et de toutes les personnes qui s'occupent des questions chevalines (in French). Vol. 2 (2nd ed.). Librairie militaire de J. Dumaine.
