= Castillonnais =

French breed of small saddle-horse

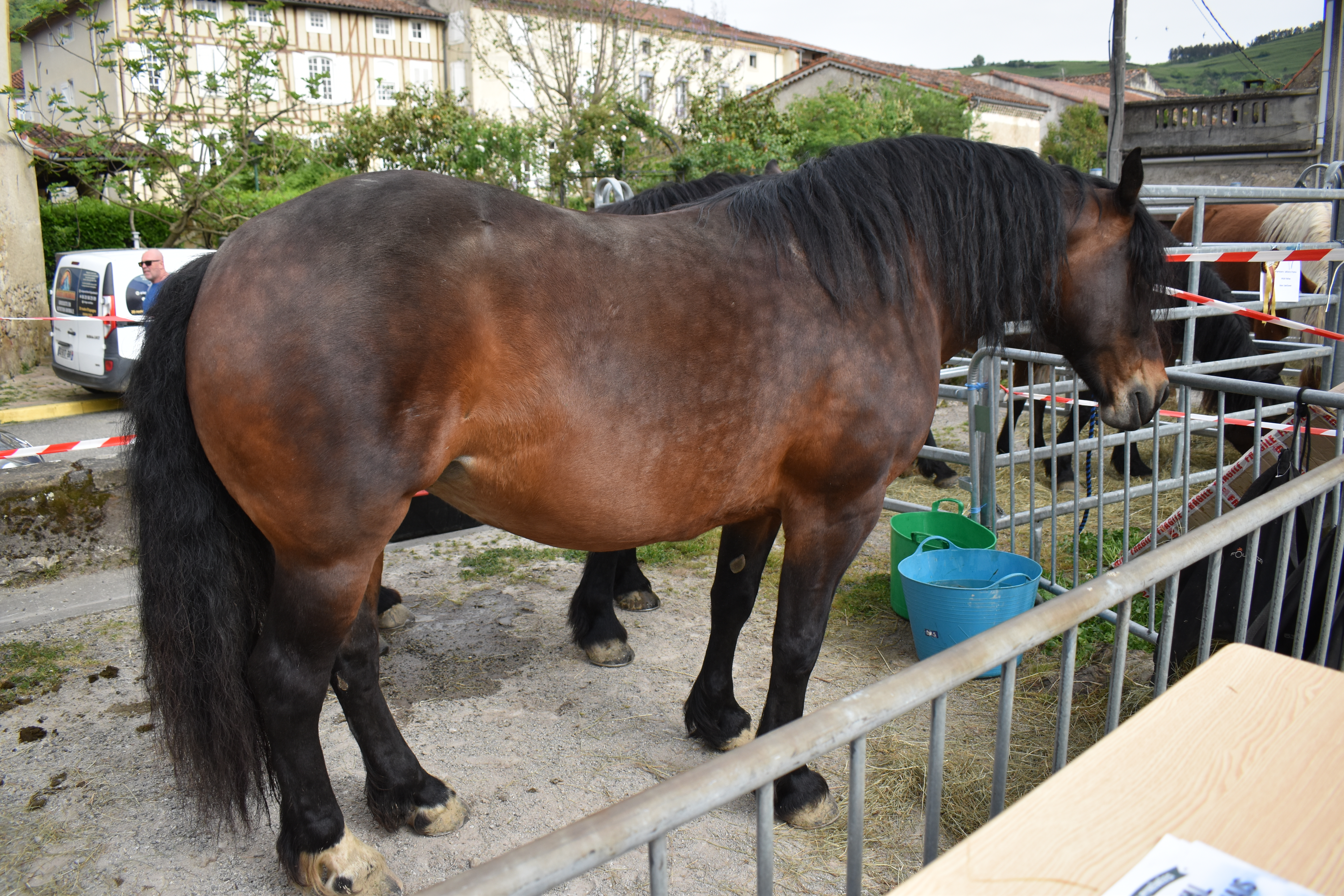

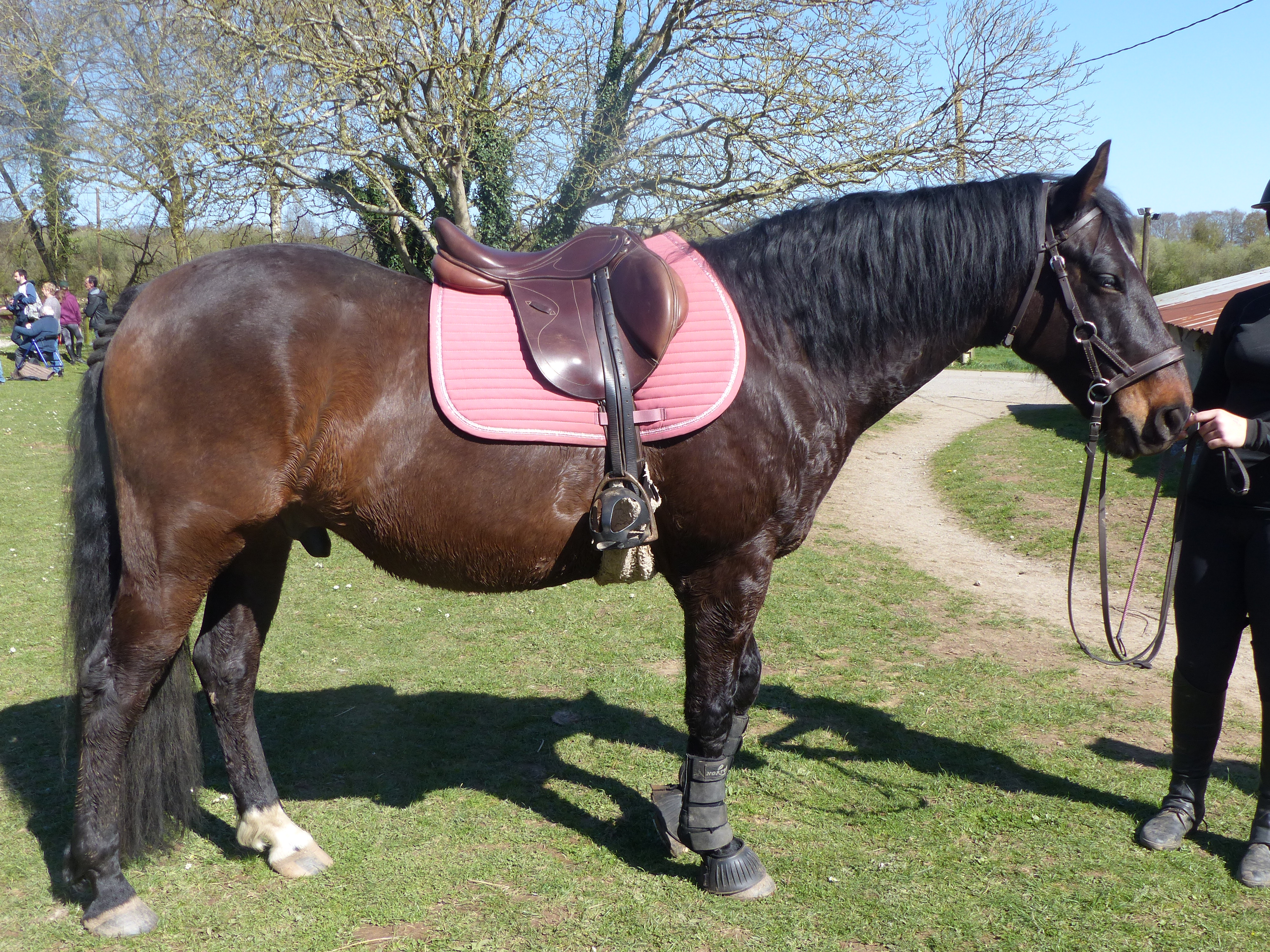
- Conservation status: FAO (2007): no data; DAD-IS (2025): at risk/endangered-maintained
- Other names: Cheval de Castillon; Cheval Ariègeois de Castillon; Cheval du Biros; Saint-Gironnais
- Country of origin: France
- Distribution: Ariège
- Standard: IFCE (in French)
- Use: riding; driving; pack-horse; mule production

Traits
- Height: 135–155 cm
- Colour: dark bay; seal brown

The Castillonais or Cheval Ariègeois de Castillon, also formerly called Cheval du Biros or Saint-Gironnais, is a French horse breed from the Ariège département of south-western France. It may be dark bay or seal brown, and stands 135–155 cm at the withers, with an average height of about 145 cm. It is used principally for trekking and driving.

Originally bred as a multi-purpose breed used for cavalry, agriculture and driving, the breed declined in population during the twentieth century, and almost became extinct. In 1980, the breed was revived and was officially recognised by the French Ministry of Agriculture in 1996. Population numbers are still quite low, and in-breeding is a concern.

== Characteristics ==
The physical characteristics seen in the breed are currently in flux, so there is not a single breed phenotype, though many members of the breed closely resemble the Merens horse. Enthusiasts are breeding for a rustic mountain horse of medium size with good gaits and temperament. Some members of the breed closely resemble Iberian horses such as the Andalusian horse. The official breed standard calls for a moderately long neck and long, sloped shoulder, broad back, rounded croup and muscular legs. Some members of the breed are branded on the left hindquarter. Because of its relative rarity and physical similarities, the Castillonnais is commonly confused with the Mérens.

Height at the withers is in the range 135 to 155 cm (13.1 to 15.1 h), with average heights of about 145 cm for mares and 147 cm for stallions and geldings. Two colours are allowed in the breed: dark bay and seal brown (noir pangaré). All horses are genetically tested for colour before registration; no horse of any other colour can be registered. The breed is considered to be an easy keeper, with an easy-going temperament. The horses are well adapted to the mountainous terrain of the Pyrenees, agile and sure-footed on mountain paths, and exhibit extended gaits with strong engagement of the hindquarters.

== Breed history ==
Like many other French breeds from the Pyrenees, the Castillonnais probably descends from the horses that inspired the Magdalenian-era paintings found, for example, at the Cave of Niaux. Over time, blood from Oriental and Iberian horses was added to the breed, and influenced its physical appearance and temperament. The Castillonnais was originally known as the "cheval du Biros" (Biros horse) or "Saint-Gironnais", a name from the town of Saint-Girons in Ariege in the Pyrenees, where a large horse fair was held the day after All Saints' Day. In the late nineteenth century, horses of the Pyrenees were known for their use as mounts by light cavalry. In 1908, Gabriel Lamarque, equine historian and president of the Société d'Agriculture de l’Ariège, began to study the breed as part of his work in the development of native horse populations in France.

The breed was originally a multi-purpose horse, used for agriculture, cavalry and pulling diligences (a type of carriage). Because of a lack of support from a breeding syndicate, such as the one in existence for the Mérens horse, once the need for a multi-purpose breed declined, the population of the Castillonnais dwindled. Many horses were cross-bred with draught horses, and the breed almost became extinct. The intervention of a group of supporters in 1980 saved the breed from extinction, and in 1992 L'Association Pyrénéenne Ariégeoise du Cheval Castillonnais (the Ariege Pyrenees Association of Castillonnais Horses) was formed, with support from several French government agencies and stud farms. Annually, in August, the association holds a small competition and sale for the breed in Castillon-en-Couserans, which also includes inspections to register horses for the breed stud-book.

The Castillonnais was officially recognised by the French ministry of agriculture in 1996, due to the efforts of a small number of breed enthusiasts, though by that time only 50 purebred mares remained. The breed association's name was changed to L’association Nationale du Cheval Castillonnais d'Ariège Pyrénées (ANCCAP) (National Association of Castillonnais Horses of the Ariège Pyrenees), and is headquartered in Castillon-en-Couserans.

Population numbers for the Castillonnais are quite low. The majority of breeders are located in Castillon-en-Couserans, in Ariège, but a few can be found in Brittany and Provence. In November 2005, there were only around 260 existing Castillonnais, and a goal was created by the breed association to double the number of purebred mares between 2005 and 2014. In-breeding is a concern due to low population numbers, and the national stud farm at Tarbes and Institut National de la Recherche Agronomique (National Institute of Agronomic Research) have been brought in to help safeguard the genetic resources of the breed.

== Uses ==
As is the case for the Corsican horse, for the draught horse breeds of France and for the donkeys of Berry, Provence and the Pyrenees, the traditional functions of the Castillonnais have disappeared. In the twenty-first century it is used for riding, for equestrian tourism and in harness. It may occasionally be used in dressage competitions, for logging, for skijöring or as a pack horse to carry food and equipment to mountainous areas otherwise accessible only by helicopter.

Mares may be put to Provence Donkey jacks for mule-breeding.

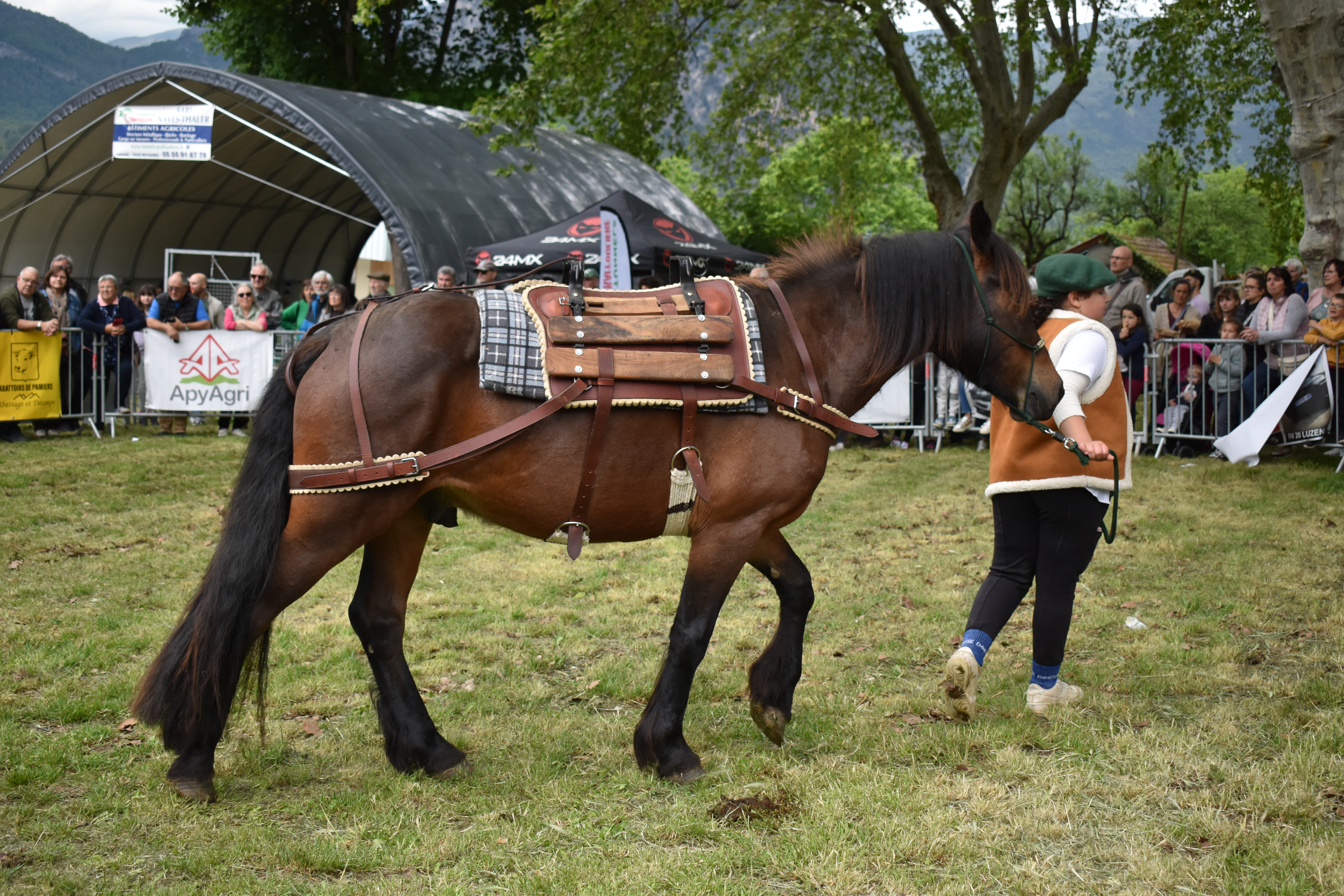
Showing as a pack horse

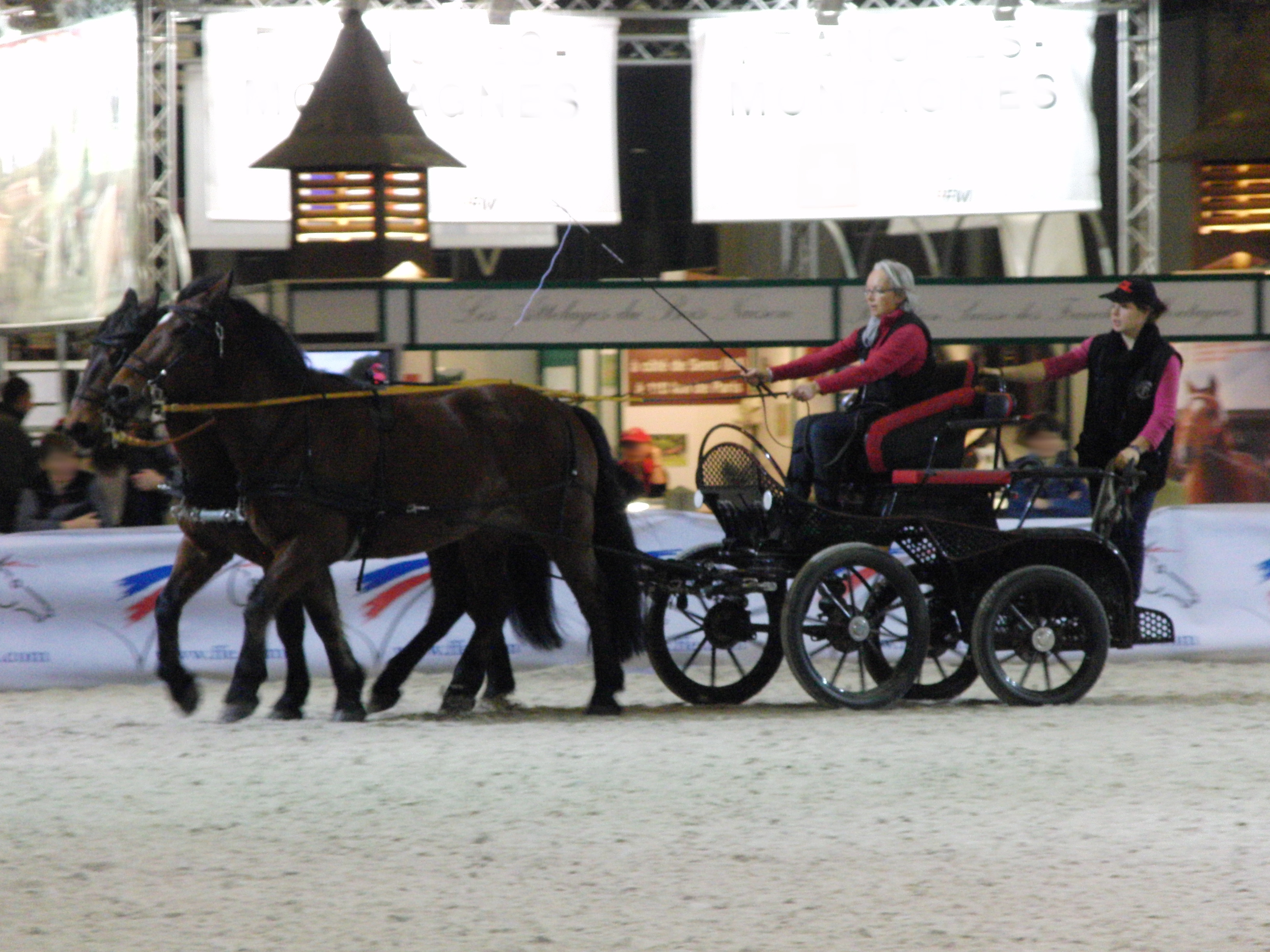
Driving a pair in harness
