= Cheval Lorrain =

French breed of horse

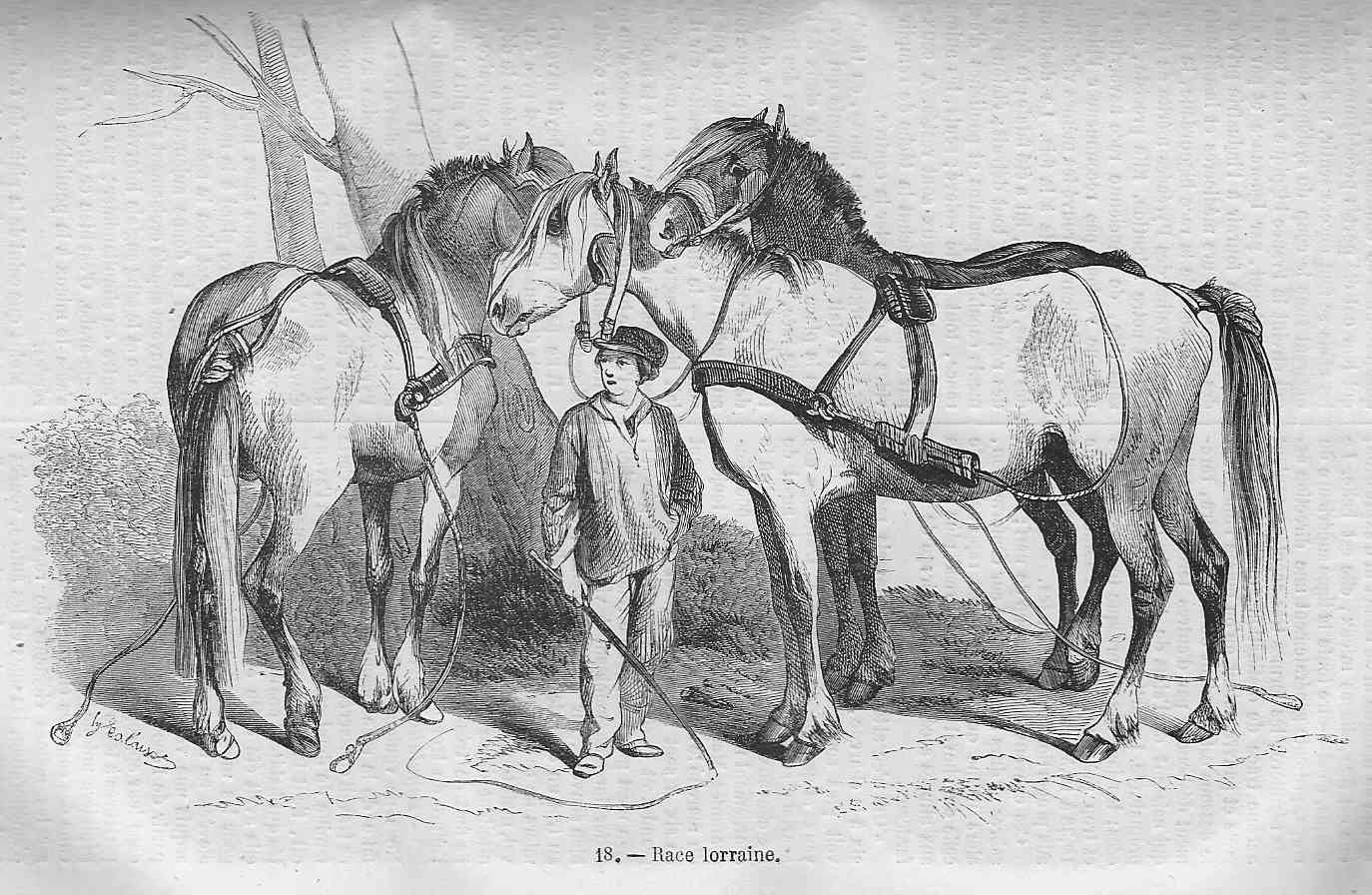
- Conservation status: Extinct
- Other names: Lorraine horse
- Country of origin: France

Le Cheval lorrain, nicknamed the haretard, is an ancient working horse breed originating in the Lorraine region, in France. Its origins date back to the 15th century, perhaps by crossbreeding between the Comtois and Ardennais races of the time, although it is claimed, like many other French races, a distant Arab origin. The numerous conflicts which agitated its breeding cradle at the time of Louis XIV lead the peasants to keep and raise small ugly and puny horses, which they are not afraid of seeing captured or requisitioned by armies.

Designed for pulling wagons and doing small-scale agricultural work, the Lorraine horse is known to be tough on the job, despite its small size. It disappeared after the second half of the 19th century with the needs of industrialization, in the face of competition from more powerful draft horses and in particular from the Ardennais, which replaced it in its breeding cradle.

== Terminology and status ==
The member of the General Council of stud farms and the National Society of Agriculture Eugène Gayot writes about this breed in 1859. According to him, the Lorraine horse is often so poor in appearance that those who use it invent a term of untranslatable contempt to designate it: "haretard", name designating a being "degraded and abject". Although all the documents talking about these horses (the oldest as well as recent studies) designate it as a “breed”, the Lorraine has never been officially recognized as such, any more than it has had any stud- book.

== See also ==
- List of French horse breeds
