= Cauchois horse =

Normand horse breed

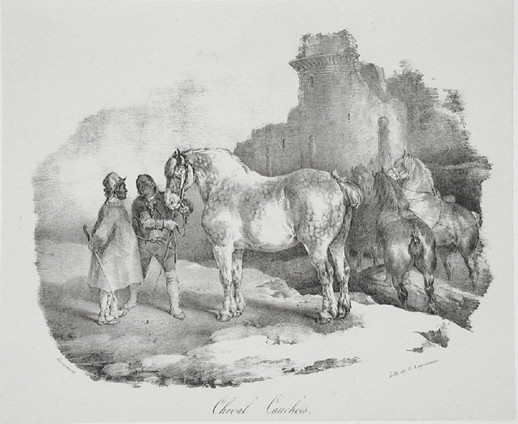
- Cheval cauchois, lithograph by Théodore Géricault, 1822.
- Country of origin: Pays de Caux, France
- Use: Horse-drawn vehicle

Traits
- Height: About 1.66 m.
- Color: Blue roan or bay

The Cauchois, also known as the Norman bidet, is a breed of heavy draft horse native to the Pays de Caux, on the coast of the former Haute-Normandie region of France. Valued for its strength and ability to move at a high pace, the Cauchois was especially sought after during the 17th and 18th centuries. These horses were primarily used for hauling heavy loads, including the stagecoaches operated by the Compagnie Générale des Omnibus, but they were also ridden by local peasants to transport goods to market.

Despite their initial popularity, the Cauchois faced a decline by the late 19th century due to the rise of railroads and the increasing use of lighter horse-drawn vehicles. As a result, this breed eventually became extinct, with its genetic legacy absorbed into the Boulonnais breed. The Cauchois has been immortalized in art, notably through a lithograph by artist Théodore Géricault in 1822, showcasing the breed's significance in the cultural landscape of its time.

== History ==
The Cauchois, commonly referred to as the "Norman bidet", is not listed in the Domestic Animal Diversity Information System (DAD-IS). The nineteenth-century zoologist André Sanson proposed a British origin for the breed, while Achille de Montendre suggested it derived from the Flemish Horse.

In the seventeenth and eighteenth centuries, the Cauchois was highly sought after by country gentlemen for its robustness and elegance. A report by M. Le Prévost, written at the time of the reorganization of the stud farms, details the breed's significance in the Pays de Caux under the Ancien Régime: "Before the Revolution, the Pays de Caux possessed a species of horse that was particularly advantageous to it, known as Cauchois horses. They were the result of native mares combined with stallions of the Norman or Danish breed, widespread in large numbers in our various cantons".

In 1820, Cauchois stallions were noted in various stud farms, including those in Amécourt, created in 1815; and in Maintenon, in the Eure-et-Loir region.

In 1846, an article in the weekly L'Illustration described the breed as "the type of draft horse", noting that it was "improperly called Boulonnais". Horses bred in the Pays de Caux were nicknamed "chevaux du bon pays (horses from the good country)" in the trade, to emphasize their qualities and to differentiate them from the heavier Picardy drafts, nicknamed "chevaux du mauvais pays (horses from the bad country)". According to Eugène Gayot, this distinction fell into disuse before the 1860s. He also notes that the Boulonnais and Cauchois breeds are tending to merge. In 1877, the Société centrale d'agriculture du département de la Seine-Inférieure in Rouen proposed various measures to "improve Cauchois horses", including crossbreeding with Thoroughbred or half-blood stallions, and a Percheron stallion.

The decline of the Cauchois breed began with the advent of railroads, which provided competition as a draft horse, as well as the tilbury, which favored mixed-breed horses. André Sanson noted this decline as early as 1867, predicting the imminent extinction of the breed in his zootechnical work published in 1888. In 1896, Jean-Henri Magne indicated that the horse breeds of northern France—Boulonnais, trait picard, Flemish, and Cauchois—were merging into a single type due to pasture reorganization and crossbreeding. In 1923, Paul Diffloth explained that the Cauchois had been suppressed by competition from other breeds, and modified by cross-breeding.

== Description ==
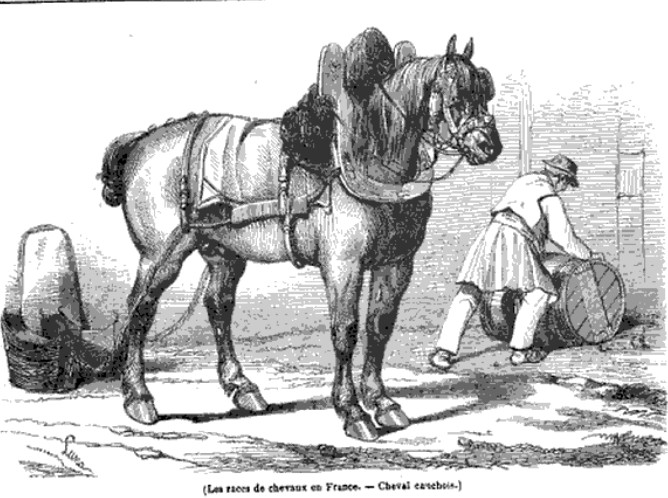
Cauchois horse in L'Illustration, 1846

The Cauchois, classified as a "gros trait" breed and often regarded as a variety of the Boulonnais, was notable for its robust build and height, averaging around 1.66 meters. According to an issue of Mélusine magazine (1878) quoting Eugène Gayot: "The Boulonnais breed belongs mainly to the Pas-de-Calais and the Somme; it becomes Bourbourien in the Nord and Cauchois in the Seine-Inférieure." This horse is sometimes described as "the most massive of French breeds". While the Cauchois possesses a strong body, F. Joseph Cardini notes that it is generally less massive than the Boulonnais, exhibiting less feathering, weaker extremities, and a less pronounced head structure. On the contrary, M. Le Prévost characterizes Cauchois horses from the Ancien Régime as less elegant than those from the Orne, Calvados, and Manche departments, noting their stronger head and more common rump.

André Sanson distinguishes the Cauchois by its "stamp of distinction and robust elegance". The withers are relatively flat, and the chest is large and prominent. The shoulders are strong and considered aesthetically pleasing. The loins and rump are broad, and the belly is voluminous. The limbs are sturdy, with well-defined forearms and thighs. The hooves are reputed to be of good quality.

Sanson indicates that the best specimens are characterized by more elongated lines, including an extended neck, protruding withers, lighter head, and a generally bay coat.

According to Diffloth, the most common coat color for the Cauchois is blue roan. The tail is typically docked, leaving two strands of hair on either side of the base, which are arranged in a plume for aesthetic appeal. The Cauchois is also reputed to be more precocious and vigorous than other Norman horse breeds.

=== Gait ===
The Cauchois breed is renowned for its high pace, characterized by a fast gait that allows a rider to cover long distances while moving with agility. Norman graziers historically traveled as far as the Vendée, Poitou, and Saintonge on their Cauchois bidets.

André Sanson notes that the typical Cauchois walks with its head low and lifts its hooves minimally, creating the impression that it may stumble with every step.

=== Nutrition ===
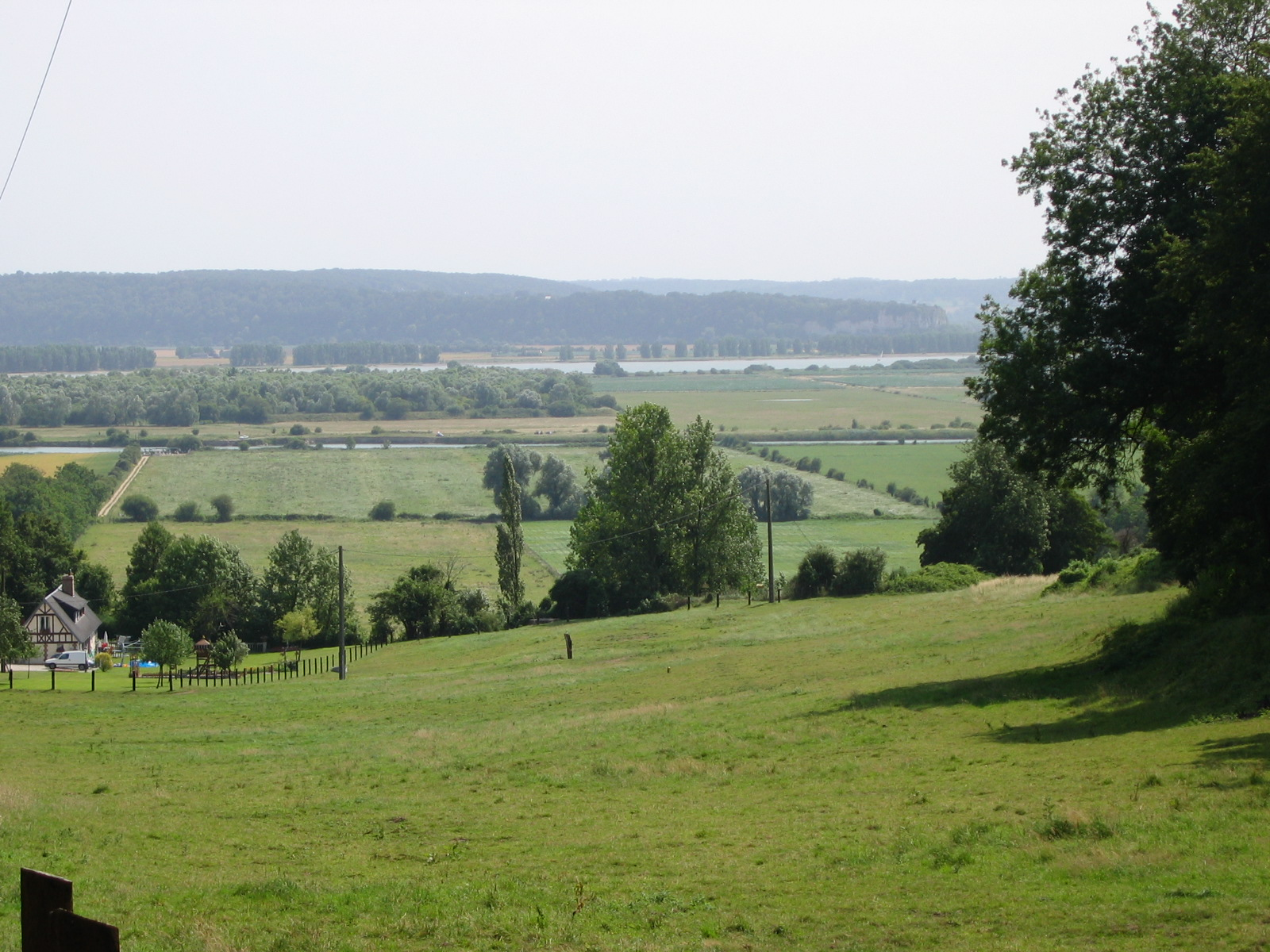
Pastures of the Pays de Caux

To support their growth, Cauchois foals are fed oats early in their development. F. Joseph Cardini believes that the food they are given produces their difference in conformation. Additionally, the pastures where they are raised are less humid than those in the Boulonnais region, producing finer and more substantial grass. The soil in their biotope is dry and elevated.

== Usage ==
The Cauchois breed was particularly well-suited for various forms of heavy drafting, making it a favored choice for pulling carriages belonging to brewers, millers, and stagecoaches. It gained popularity among merchants and affluent city dwellers.

In its native region, the Cauchois is employed to pull large, four-wheeled carts over rugged terrain. An article in L'Illustration notes that Cauchois horses were not typically ridden. They are put to work from the age of two and are often sold in the Parisian market by the age of five, either for service or heavy driving. According to Francois-Pierre-Charles, Baron Dupin, young Cauchois are initially employed to pull a harrow, followed by ploughing six months later. By the age of four or five, their resale price is generally double the original purchase price.

Between 1855 and 1900, the Compagnie Générale des Omnibus (CGO) incorporated approximately 9.72% Cauchois horses into its workforce, with the majority being Percherons. According to statistics, the Cauchois has the lowest mortality rate of all the breeds used by the CGO. This low rate may not solely be attributed to the breed's inherent resilience but rather to effective breeding and training practices. Breeders worked with their horses before delivering them to the CGO, facilitating better adaptation to the company's training requirements. In the 1830s, the Cauchoise breed was in demand for large cavalry.

In 1867, André Sanson noted that "mares (from the Pays de Caux) are still called Cauchoises (feminine of Cauchois in French). They are the ones who carry the beautiful farm girls of the Pays de Caux to market". Under the Ancien Régime, these horses were highly valued by cavalry and dragoon units, with the Royal-Piémont cavalry regiment sourcing its mounts from the Pays de Caux for several consecutive years. The breed's precociousness enabled it to enter the war squadrons a year earlier.

== The spread of breeding ==
Unique to the Pays de Caux region, the Cauchois was once bred in the arrondissement of Le Havre. However, by the early nineteenth century, local farmers began to favor purchasing Boulonnaise-bred foals aged between one year and 15 months, subsequently reselling them in Paris and Lyon at four years of age. Trade links between the Pays de Caux and Picardy go back a long way, giving rise to the practice known as "entraitage".

In 1840, a horse of "Bulle" type in the Swiss canton of Fribourg was reported to be of Cauchois origin.

== Cultural impact ==
The Cauchois has inspired artists, particularly in depictions of Norman farm women knitting while riding their bidets returning from the market. Notably, Théodore Géricault created a small lithograph illustrating a Cauchois horse turned to the left, held by a horse dealer. This work appeared in the catalog of a sale of works of art held at the Hôtel Drouot on 6 March 1885.

== See also ==
- List of French horse breeds

== Bibliography ==
- Barral, Jean-Augustin (1886). Dictionnaire d'agriculture, encyclopédie agricole complète (in French). Vol. 2. Hachette et cie.
- Bouchet, Ghislaine (1993). Le cheval à Paris de 1850 à 1914 : Mémoires et documents de l'École des Chartes (in French). Librairie Droz.
- Diffloth, Paul (1923). Zootechnie. Races chevalines. Elevage et Exploitation des chevaux de trait et des chevaux de selle. Encyclopédie agricole (in French) (5th ed.). libr. J.-B. Baillière et fils.
- Manneville, Philippe; De Gennes, Jean-Pierre; Secrétariat permanent des congrès des sociétés historiques et archéologiques de Normandie (1996). Le cheval en Normandie : actes du XXVIIIe congrès tenu à Mortagne-au-Perche du 21 au 24 octobre 1993. Musée de Normandie.
- Moll, Louis; Gayot, Eugène (1861). La connaissance générale du cheval : études de zootechnie pratique, avec un atlas de 160 pages et de 103 figures. Didot.
- De Montendre, Achille (1840). Des institutions hippiques et de l'élève du cheval dans les principaux États de l'Europe. Bureau du Journal des haras.
- Sanson, André (1888). Traité de zootechnie : Zoologie et zootechnie spéciales : équidés caballins et asiniens (3rd ed.). Librairie agricole de la Maison rustique.
- Vianne, Edmond (1869). La ferme et les champs : guide pratique de l'agriculteur (2nd ed.). P. Dupont.
- L'Illustration (1846). "Les races de chevaux en France". L'Illustration : journal universel.
