= Corsican horse =

Breed of horse

Corse
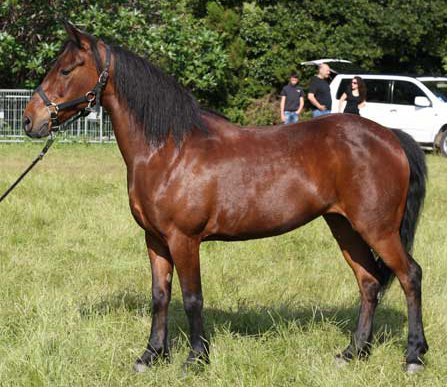
- A Corse mare
- Other names: Corsican: U Cavallu Corsu; Corsican: U Paganacciu; French: Cheval corse
- Country of origin: Corsica, France

Traits
- Distinguishing features: Height 1.30–1.50 m Weight 300–400 kg

Breed standards
- Assocciu U Cavallu Corsu; Haras Nationaux

The Corsican (Corsican: U Cavallu Corsu or u paganacciu, French: Cheval corse) is a breed of small domestic horse indigenous to the Mediterranean island of Corsica, off the coast of south-eastern France. The breed was officially recognised in February 2012, more than thirty years after the process was begun. The stud-book is kept by a breeders' association, the Association Nationale de Race U Cavallu Corsu. The total population in the island is estimated at 1000. Since the stud-book was established in 2012, about 100 animals have been registered.

== Characteristics ==
The Corsican is a small horse, standing between 1.30 and 1.50 metres (12.3 and 14.3 hands) at the withers and weighing 300–400 kg. The coat colour may be black, seal brown, or any shade of bay; minimal white markings are tolerated. The head is relatively short, sometimes heavy, with a straight profile. The body is compact, with a short and sloping croup. The legs are fine, with small hard hooves.

== History ==
There are no equines in the fossil record of Corsica, and for that reason it is believed that humans brought the first horses to the island, along with a number of other animals. The Haras Nationaux set up a remount depot on the island in 1861 for the purpose of producing light cavalry horses and mules. When the military ceased to breed horses there, the animals remaining were bred by local people and reverted to a homogeneous phenotype due to what essentially became natural selection.

== Uses ==
Today most Corsican horses are used for trail riding, primarily within the tourist industry. They are noted for toughness and endurance.

== See also ==
- List of French horse breeds
