= Laetitia Bataille =

French journalist and author

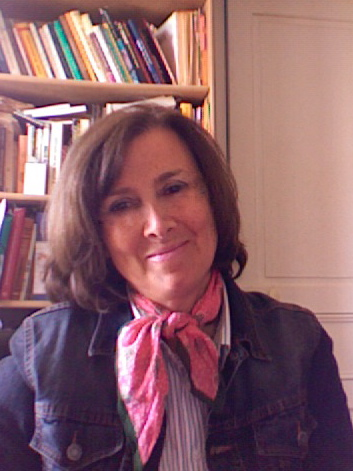
Laetitia Bataille

Laetitia Bataille is a French journalist and author, specializing in equestrianism.

== Publications ==
Laetitia Bataille has written thousands of articles issued in various equestrian magazines. She is also the author of 14 books or booklets on horses. In 2009, she launched her own horse magazine, Cheval Savoir (“horse knowledge”) published on the Internet with articles in both French and English.

- Races équines de France, France Agricole Éditions, Paris, 2008 ISBN 978-2-85557-154-6
- Les poneys: races et élevage, France Agricole Éditions, Paris, 2007, ISBN 9782855571409
- La monture pour enfants: Choix, préparation, entretien, 2006
- Le lusitanien, 2004
- La mule poitevine, 2004
- L'équitation, Aedis, 2003
- Le pure race espagnole, 2002
- Le cheval, Aedis, 2002
- Cheval : problèmes et solutions, 2001
- J'élève mes poneys, Maloine, 1994
- Choix du cheval de randonnée, Equilivres, 1993
- À bon port, en bon état, Prest édit, 1984

== See also ==
- Haguard horse
