= Carrossier noir du Cotentin =

Extinct French breed of horse

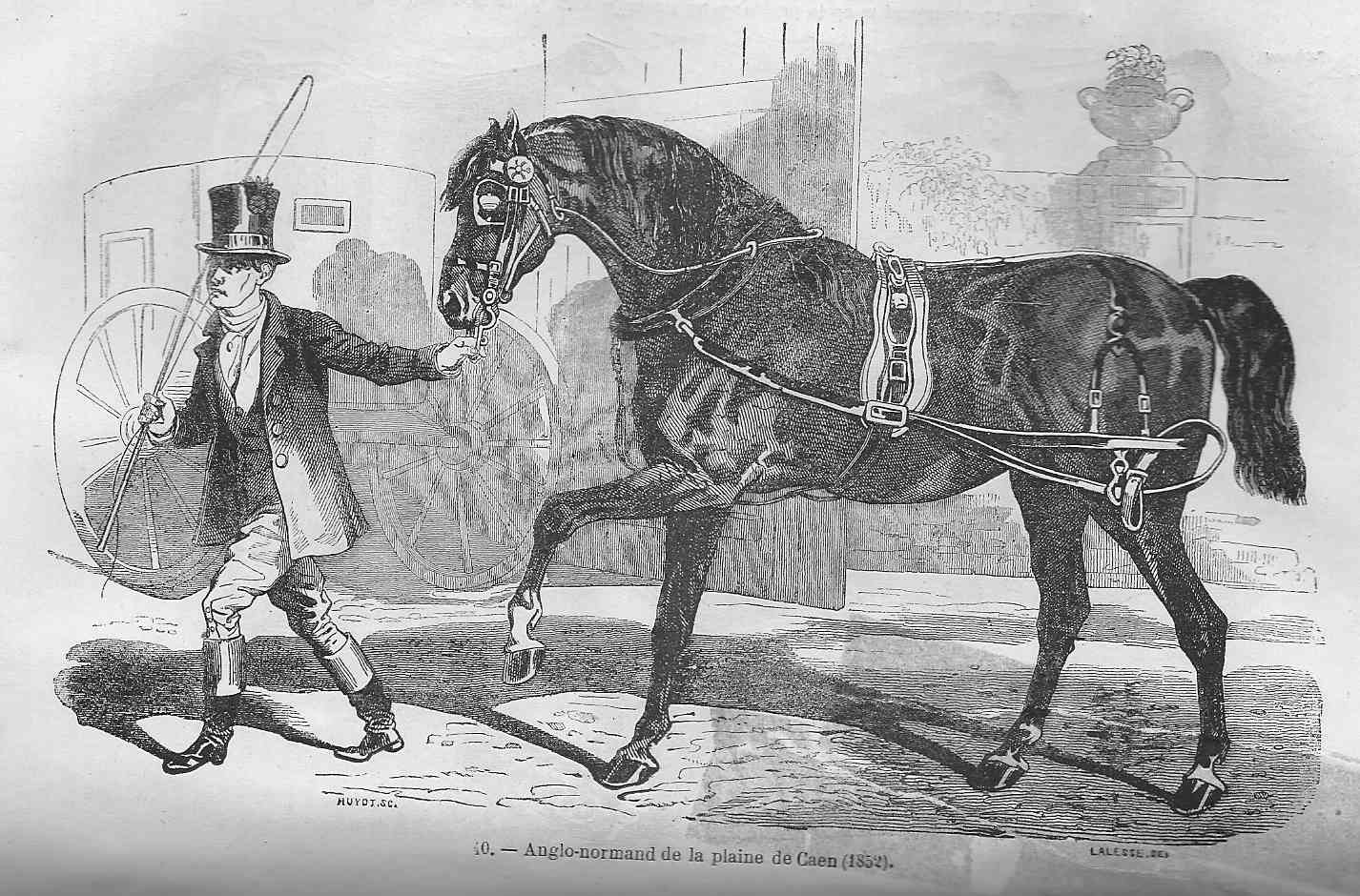
- Anglo-Norman horse from the Caen countryside, corresponding to an exported Carrossier noir. Encyclopédie pratique de l'agriculteur, 1852.
- Conservation status: Extinct
- Other names: Grand normand du Cotentin, double-bidet
- Country of origin: France
- Use: Pulling carriage, heavy cavalry mount

Traits
- Height: Between 1.50 m and 1.60 m
- Colour: Black coat
- Distinguishing features: Convex head profile, a long back and loins.

The Carrossier noir du Cotentin (black carriage horse) is a large, black, pulling horse breed unique to Cotentin. It was regularly described and quoted during the Ancien Régime (Old Regime) and may have descended from Danish horses. As its name suggests, this horse was mainly used to pull carriages, and its uniform color made it possible to form homogeneous groups.

Valued until the beginning of the 19th century, this breed became extinct as a result of crossbreeding with the Anglo-Norman breed, the cornage disease, and the deterioration of its coat color.

The breed was historically bred at the Saint-Lô National Stud Farm. The last Carrossier Noir stallion at this stud farm, "Le Corbeau", died in 1836.

This rather heavy horse had a convex head profile, a long back, and loins. Its character was said to be friendly and docile, although sometimes a bit sluggish.

== History ==
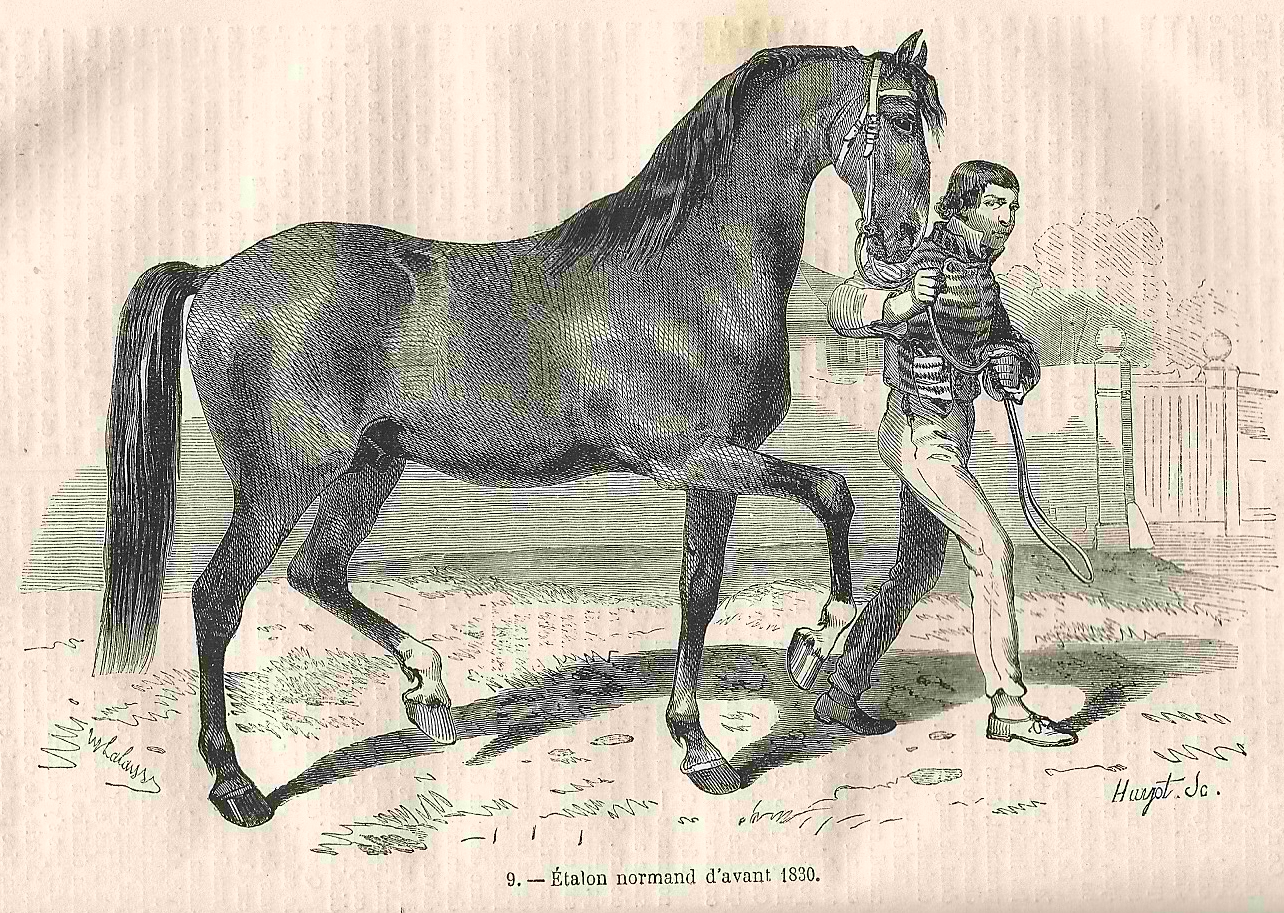
Type of stallion Norman before 1830.

The Carrossier noir du Cotentin is not listed in DAD-IS, nor in the second edition of the University of Oklahoma book of horse breeds (2007), nor in the index of extinct horse breeds in the book by Delachaux et Niestlé (2014), nor the 2016 edition of the CAB International encyclopedia.

This horse is generally referred to as the "Carrossier noir du Cotentin" in the most recent sources, and is also called the "Grand normand du Cotentin". According to the hippologist Eugène Gayot, it was sometimes nicknamed "double-bidet". Its history is little known, not least because it is mentioned in writing after its disappearance and/or indirectly: hippologists rarely, if ever, studied it in situ. According to Eugène Gayot, Claude Bourgelat and Louis-Furcy Grognier confused the Carrossier noir du Cotentin with the Merlerault, as the coat color and the breeding cradle did not match.

Stud farms have existed in the Cotentin since the 11th century. Louis-Furcy Grognier attributes the ancestry of the breed to the "Danish horse" introduced to the Duchy of Normandy by the Vikings. Buffon believed that the best draft horses in France came from Lower Normandy and Cotentin.

Until about 1775, this local breed was considered unrivaled as a pulling horse in France and part of Europe. Its breeders saved it from inbreeding under Louis XV. It seems to have become much less widespread after 1789 but remained famous until the early 19th century. In 1812, Pichard wrote in his "Manuel des Haras": "The Normande breed is almost lost... We no longer recognize these famous Cotentin Bidets, which were the admiration of all Europe".

In 1835, an article in Le Pilote du Calvados also spoke of the breed's disappearance: "Let's go to Cotentin and look for this breed, which is so elegant, with its square head, its eyes full of fire, its small ears so well placed and made them excellent carriage horses, robust and courageous". The degradation of the black coat and the gaits of the Cotentin horses probably led the Norman breeders to cross their black horses with the Bay breed. According to archivist Alain Talon, it was cornage, a respiratory disease, that was responsible for the demise of this breed, as breeders believed it was transmitted by Carrossier Noir stallions. The last Carrossier noir stallion at the Saint-Lô stud farm, named "Le Corbeau" (Matricule 181), died in 1836. This horse is described in the stud farm's registers as "of Norman breed, very strongly built, very short legs, very clean limbs". It was considered "an impossible substitute for the old Carrossier noir du Cotentin" and was ridden between 1829 and 1836 in Saint-Côme-du-Mont and the Bessin region.

By the middle of the 19th century, this breed had probably disappeared: Eugène Gayot (between 1848 and 1853) quotes a hippologist who mentions the disappearance of the breed because it "would no longer meet the needs of the time". According to Paul Diffloth (1923), this breed disappeared in favor of the Anglo-Norman breed.

== Description ==
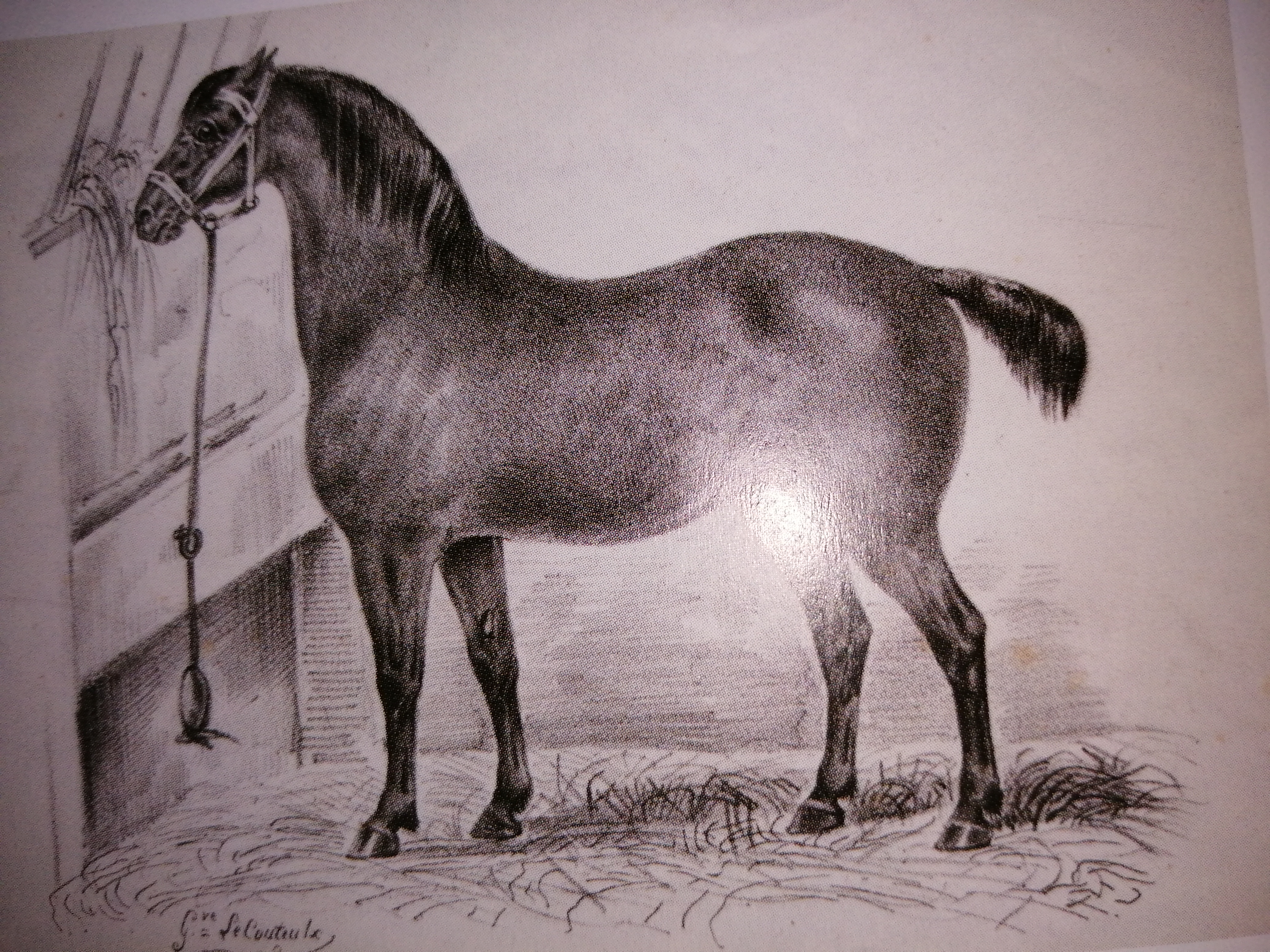
Cocotte, a Carrossier noir du Cotentin mare, in 1829.

According to Bernard Denis, these horses are between 1.50 m and 1.60 m tall. In 1812, Guitton, sub-prefect of the Bayeux district, attributed to them a height ranging from 1.58 m to 1.70 m. Eugène Gayot gives a maximum height of up to 1.66 m. Jacques Mulliez gives a range of 1.51 m to 1.62 m, making it one of the largest French horse breeds known in the 17th and 18th centuries, along with the Poitevin horse.

Guitton describes the Carrossier noir du Cotentin (black carriage horses), as similar to draft horses but with "more perfection".

Gayot, on the other hand, describes these horses as compact and regular in shape, but sometimes not very elegant, with "often common heads, short necks, loaded shoulders, low fronts, and slightly long backs", but he recognizes "limbs, cloth, temperament, and substance". The head is strong, and narrow, with a convex profile, particularly in the region of the muzzle. The eyes are small, the lips large, and the ears long. The neck is broad and strongly rolled.

The withers are prominent according to Guitton, and low according to Gayot. The shoulders are short and muscular. The chest is broad, the loins long, and the rump rounded according to Gayot, broad and square according to Guitton. Legs are thick, the hoofs are high, the tail is bushy and the coat is always black.

The breed's character is said to be friendly and docile, although sometimes a bit sluggish. This breed is a late bloomer, not reaching maturity until the age of six or seven. These horses are bred in rich grassland environments, which no doubt accounts for their large size.

== Uses ==
The Carrossier noir du Cotentin is considered to be "the type of carriage horse". It has an excellent reputation as a draft horse and as a heavy cavalry mount. Its consistently black coat makes it possible to create uniformly colored carriages. Under the Old Regime, many wealthy families and abbots were keen to acquire herds of Cotentin horses for this very reason.

The breed has been widely exported from its breeding cradle to be crossed with various regional French horse populations to increase their size. In particular, it is crossed with horses of Bas-Poitou (Low Poitou).

== Breeding area distribution ==
The Cotentin horse is bred in the department of Manche, especially around Coutances. In 1808, Duhaussey, director of the Saint-Lô stallion depot, classified the breeds of horses in the region according to their use, noting that 10% of them were carriage horses. In 1818, according to the Revue des étalons, the Saint-Lô depot was considered the breeding ground of major carriage makers. The Revue des étalons of 1824 mentions 17 black carriage stallions among the 32 listed by the inspector at Saint-Lô.

Edmond Gast (1889) mentions the breed as specific to the Manche department, highly valued and widespread.

The breed is often imported to the Caen countryside. This has led to confusion between different strains under the name "horse of Caen countryside", which became known as the "Normandy breed".

=== See also ===
- List of French horse breeds
- Horse breeding in France
- Horses in Normandy

== Bibliography ==
- Denis, Bernard (2012). "Les races de chevaux en France au xviiie siècle. Et les idées relatives à leur amélioration". In Situ: Revue des patrimoines (in French) (18). doi:10.4000/insitu.9677.
- Diffloth, Paul (1923). Zootechnie. Races chevalines. Elevage et Exploitation des chevaux de trait et des chevaux de selle (in French) (5th ed.). Paris: J.-B. Baillière et fils.
- Gayot, Eugène (1853). La France chevaline. 2 (in French). Vol. 4. Paris: Comptoir des imprimeurs unis and Vve Bouchard-Huzard.
- Moll, Louis; Gayot, Eugène (1861). La connaissance générale du cheval : études de zootechnie pratique, avec un atlas de 160 pages et de 103 figures (in French). Vol. atlas. Didot.
- Musset, René; Robien, Henry (1917). L'élevage du cheval en France : Précédé d'une bibliographie de l'élevage du cheval en France du xviie siècle à nos jours, suivi d'études sur l'élevage du cheval dans le Perche, le Boulonnais et la Basse-Normandie (in French). Paris: Librairie agricole de la Maison rustique.
- Anonymous (1835). Journal des haras, chasses, et courses de chevaux, des progrès des sciences zooïatriques et de médecine comparée (in French). Parent.
- Roche, Daniel; Reytier, Daniel (2000). Voitures, chevaux et attelages : du XVIe au XIXe siècle (in French). Association pour l'Académie d'art équestre de Versailles. ISBN 9782913018013.
- Talon, Alain (2014). Le cheval en Normandie : 1665-1965 du Carossier noir au Selle français (in French). OREP Editions. ISBN 9782815102209.
- Talon, Alain (2016). "Le goût exclusif pour le cheval bai, ou comment suivre les dernières traces du carrossier noir du Cotentin (1700-1840)". Cheval et Normandie : Histoire, patrimoine et héritages (in French). Saint Lô: Société d'archéologie et d'histoire du département de la Manche. ISBN 978-2-914329-27-9.
