= Seal brown =

Rich dark brown color

Color coordinates
- Hex triplet: #321414
- sRGB^{B} (r, g, b): (50, 20, 20)
- HSV (h, s, v): (0°, 60%, 20%)
- CIELCh_{uv} (L, C, h): (11, 15, 12°)
- Source: ColorHexa
- ISCC–NBS descriptor: Deep brown
- B: Normalized to [0–255] (byte)

Seal brown is a rich dark brown color, resembling the color of the dyed fur from the fur seal.

== Usage ==
The specifications for the U.S. Army Air Corps Type A-2 jacket (regulation summer flying jacket), adopted in 1931 and the most familiar among all leather flight jackets, stated that it should be made of horsehide tanned to seal brown. However, initially, oxidation during the dyeing process caused the jackets to end up russet (a lighter, reddish brown) in color. Later in the decade, they were able to prevent oxidation during dyeing, and the jackets produced were a proper dark brown.

Seal brown is one of the official colors of Lehigh University, Brown University, the Cleveland Browns football team, and the engineering honor society, Tau Beta Pi.

== See also ==
- List of colors
