= Banei (disambiguation) =

Ban'ei is a form of Japanese horse racing.

Ban'ei or Banei may also refer to:

- Banei, Budaun, a village in Uttar Pradesh, India
- Ban'ei Kinen, a Grade 1 Ban'ei horse race, held in Obihiro, Hokkaido, Japan
