= Auxois =

Horse breed from eastern France

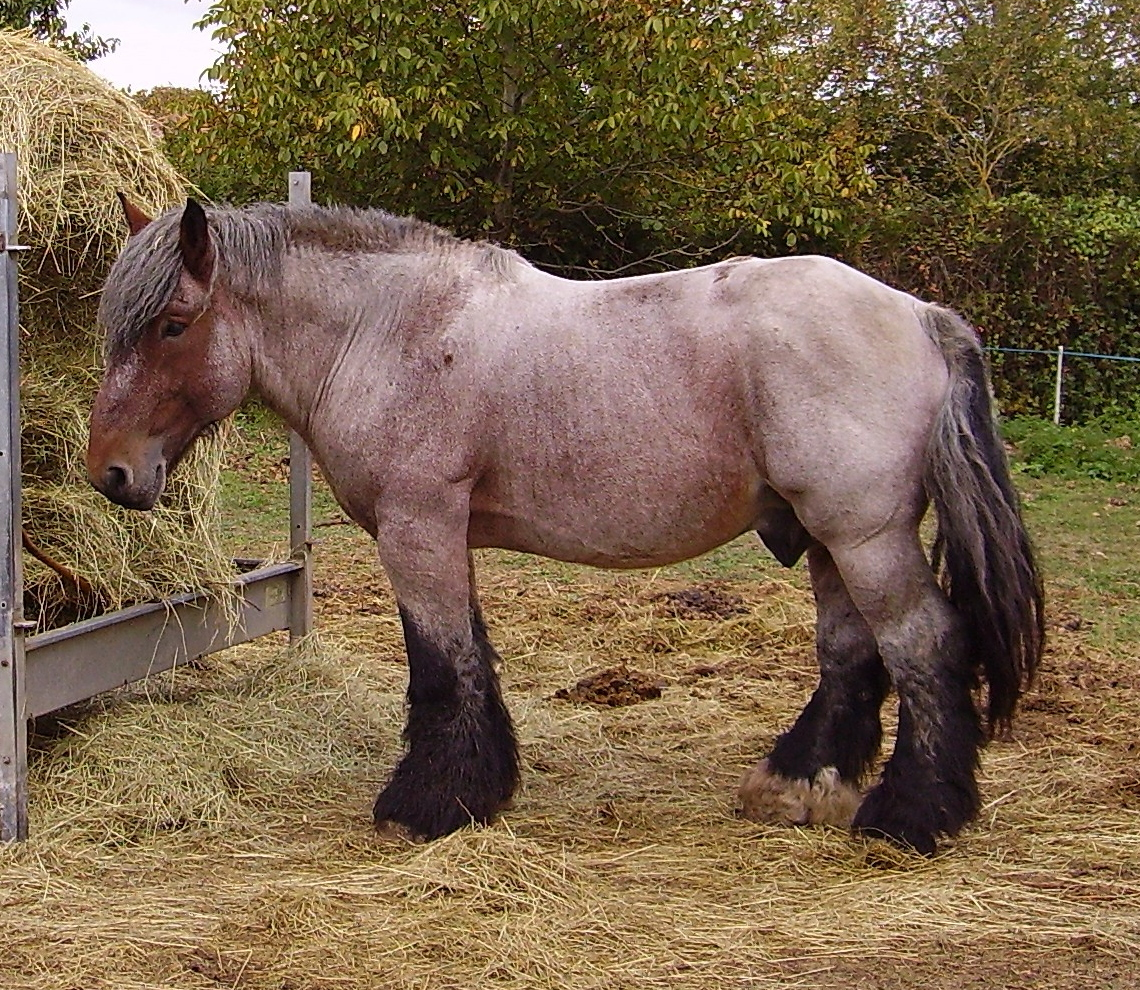

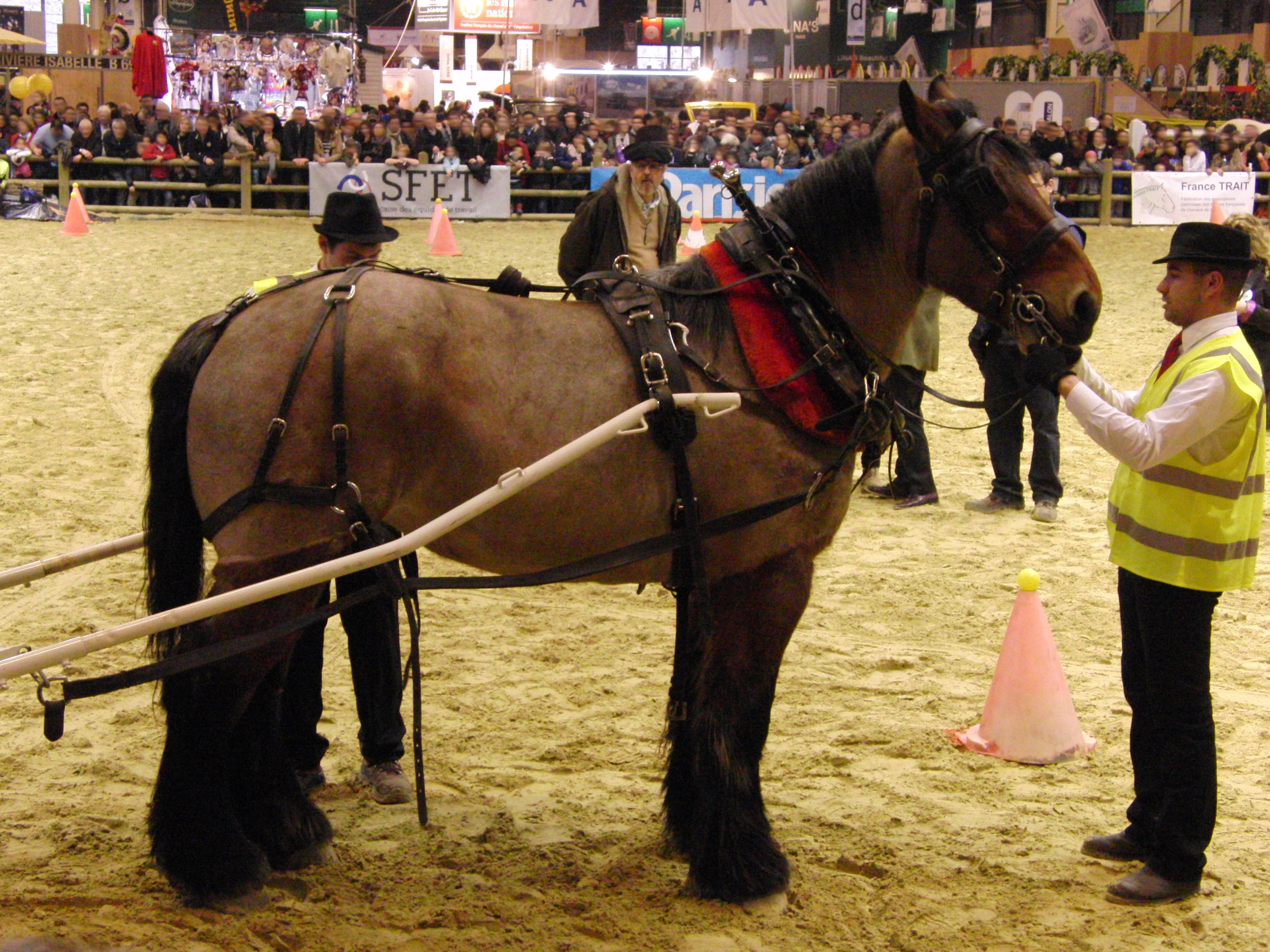
- Country of origin: France

Breed standards
- Haras Nationaux

The Auxois (French pronunciation: [o(k)swa]) is a horse breed from eastern France. It is a large breed, with some individuals weighing over 910 kilograms (2,010 lb), bred for horse meat, agricultural work and leisure pursuits. Overall, members of the breed are solid and muscular in appearance. They are usually bay or bay roan in color, although some other colors are accepted by the breed registry, and are known for their power and docility.

The Auxois is a direct descendant of the Bourguignon of the Middle Ages. In the 19th century, blood was added from other French draft breeds before the creation of a stud book in 1912. After the creation of the stud book, only purebred Auxois or Ardennais and Trait du Nord crosses could be registered. World War I interrupted efforts to set the breed standard, but testing resumed in 1920, and between then and World War II the Auxois was the pride of regional farmers. The breed reached its peak in the 1930s, but by the 1960s began to decline with the advent of mechanization.

By the 1970s, the Auxois had almost become extinct, and the French government began pushing the breeding of all native draft horses for meat production, as opposed to agricultural usage. However, the meat of the Auxois was not considered high quality, and this, combined with a lower-than-expected market for meat, led to a continued decline in French draft horse populations. In the 1990s, the French government reversed its position on breeding for meat, and began promoting draft breeds for leisure pursuits. The Auxois continues to be rare, having the eighth-smallest population numbers of the nine native French draft breeds. An annual breed show is held in Semur-en-Auxois, and the Auxois is frequently seen at the Paris International Agricultural Show.

== Breed characteristics ==
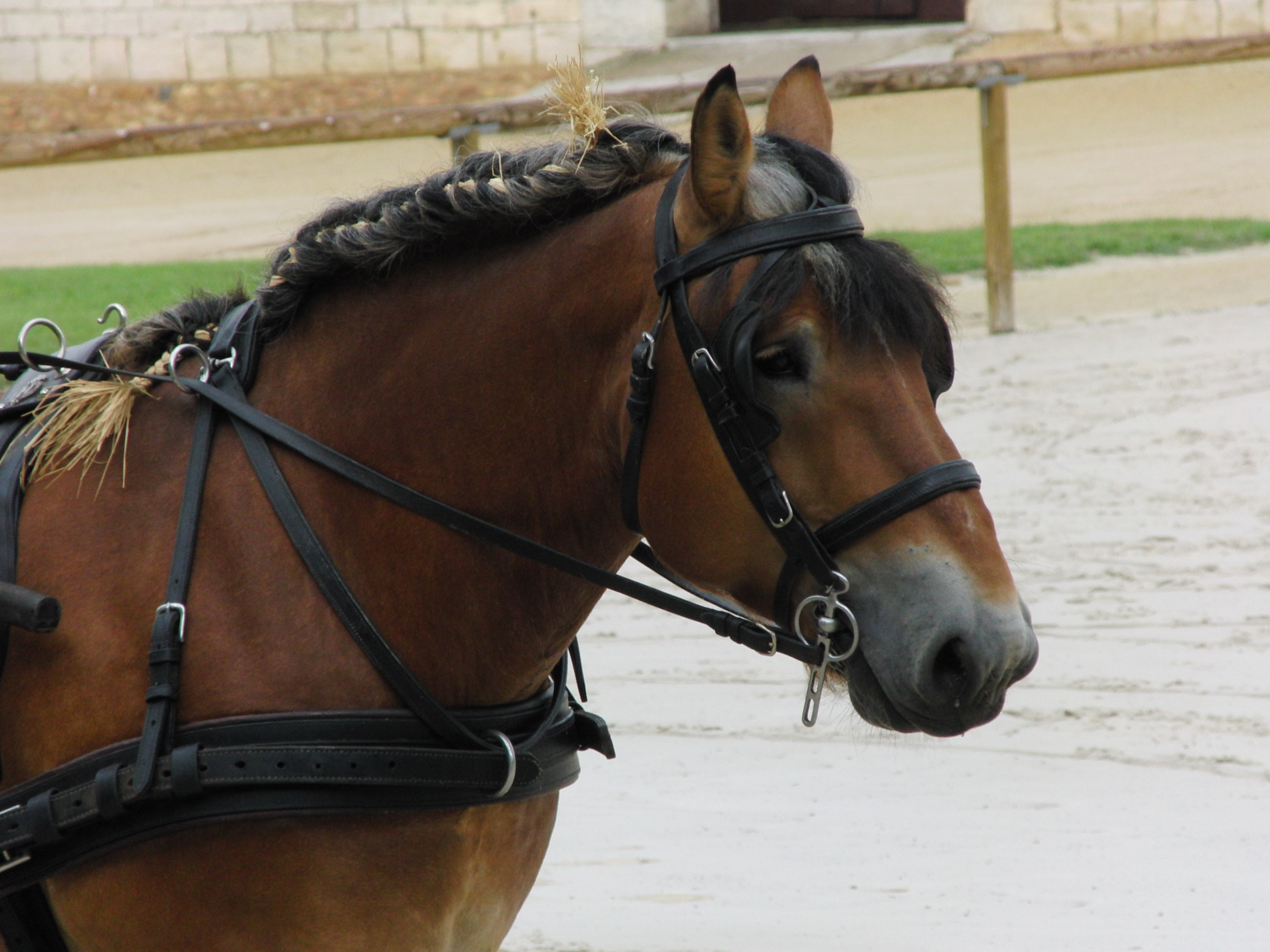
The head and neck of an Auxois at the Cluny Stud

The Auxois is a horse of great size, larger than the Ardennais and almost as large as the Trait du Nord. It is massively muscular in build, built for heavy pulling. The average height is 15.3 to 16.3 hands (63 to 67 inches, 160 to 170 cm), with an ideal height of 16.1 hands (65 inches, 165 cm) to 16.3^{3}/_{4} hands (67.75 inches, 172 cm) for stallions and 16 to 16.3 hands (64 to 67 inches, 163 to 170 cm) for mares. They weigh from 700 kilograms (1,500 lb) to more than 910 kilograms (2,010 lb), depending on whether an individual horse is bred for meat, agricultural work or leisure pursuits.

The head is relatively short, with a wide forehead. The neck is also relatively short and muscular, the shoulders long and sloping and the chest wide and deep. The body is solid, with a broad, short back and loins. The hindquarters are well-muscled. The legs are robust, although they can appear small in relation to the mass of the body. They usually have less feathering on the legs than other French draft horse breeds. Horses registered with the studbook may be branded on the left side of the neck with the letters "TX". This brand is generally applied during breed competitions, and only after the age of two.

Auxois horses are usually bay or bay roan in color, although they can also be chestnut or red roan, similar to the Ardennais. gray and seal brown (the latter called black pangaré by the breed registry, although these horses are genetically brown, not black with pangaré markings) are also accepted for registration; all other colors are excluded. The Auxois is known for its power and docility, having a calm and gentle temperament. Like the Ardennais, it is an easy keeper, able to survive outdoors in all seasons, even in the harsh climatic conditions sometimes seen in Morvan and Nievre.

The majority of Auxois are still bred for meat production, and in 2001, 50% of the horses bred were intended for slaughter. However, the power and gaits of the breed make them valued for competitive and leisure driving, as well as equestrian tourism. The smaller horses of the breed are used for milk production. The Auxois is used for celebrations, such as weddings, and historical reenactments. It is also used for logging, and in recent years, has been increasingly used in agriculture, being found in vineyards, gardens and farms. The use of them for the maintenance of rural roads is also in planning.

== History ==
The history of the Auxois is closely tied to its homeland, for which it is named. The rich pastures of the Auxois area, including the French Gold Coast, parts of Yonne, the Saône-et-Loire and northern Nièvre, are conducive to the breeding of large draft horses. The recognition of the Auxois dates back to the early 20th century, making it relatively new compared to other French draft breeds.

The Auxois is a direct descendant of the Bourguignon of the Middle Ages, a small, robust, tough horse used for riding and driving. A now-discredited theory once held that the Auxois was a descendant of the even older Solutre horse, the bones of which were found in the area where the breed was developed. Originally the Morvan horse also existed in the same area, but was absorbed into the Auxois after extensive crossbreeding. During the 1840s, Percheron blood was introduced to the breed, followed by Boulonnais blood in the 1860s and Ardennais and possibly Nivernais blood in the late 19th century. Care was not taken to fix a specific breed type, though, and so the physical characteristics were variable.

Breeders introduced foreign stallions before creating a stud book for the breed. The breed took its name from the "rich valley of Auxois", where the crossbreeding and selection for the new breed took place. The local mares created from 19th century breeding were crossed with Ardennais and Trait du Nord stallions, sought after for their large size and power, which made them valuable for agricultural work. The birthplace of the breed is around the Cluny Stud, and it was originally considered to be a sub-type of the Ardennais breed.

The first attempts to create a breed registry in 1903 and 1904 failed. In 1912, another attempt was made, this time successful, and a stud book was created in Dijon in 1913. With the creation of the stud book, only purebred Auxois or Ardennais and Trait du Nord crosses could be registered. However, by 1917, the physical characteristics of the breed were still not fixed, and leaders of the equine community were critical, and doubtful of whether the Auxois was a breed in its own right or still merely a subtype of the Ardennais. They were also unsure whether it was a good idea to accept the recognition of another regional breed, of which France had many.

=== World War I and World War II ===
World War I interrupted the efforts to secure a breed standard, with stud book selection not resuming until 1920. Within a few years, the ideal height was set around 15.3 hands (63 inches, 160 cm), and its breeding spread throughout Auxois and neighboring regions.

Between World War I and World War II, the Auxois was the pride of regional farmers. Before the advent of motorization, it was the preferred pulling animal, even for slow work, winning out over the local Charolais cattle breed used as oxen. The Auxois was bred solely for agricultural work, and used exclusively for this purpose. The strongest horses were used for multi-horse hitches in the fields and for logging. The Auxois competed in popularity with the Nivernais horse, and it was not uncommon for farmers in the region to have both the black-coated Nivernais and the red-coated Ardennais and Auxois to satisfy the color preferences of all potential buyers.

In the early 1930s the Auxois reached the peak of its physical development. It was described, like the Ardennais and the Trait du Nord, as a born plowhorse, with a neck naturally held so low that the nose almost touched the ground. It was developed entirely for traction, and its conformation allowed it to move huge weights over short distances. At the same time, it became more popular than the Nivernais, and was considered a southern representation of the Ardennais breed. Merchants visiting Burgundy horse fairs appreciated the breed, and deemed its bay coloration better able to hide dirt than that of the light gray Percheron or black Nivernais. The peak populations and usage of the Auxois and other French draft horses was short due to the advent of mechanization in the 1960s.

=== Post-war to 1990s ===
During World War II, fuel stocks were used by the armies, and were unavailable to farmers. This allowed horses to remain a key aspect of agriculture and transportation until the end of the war. After the war, farmers rapidly mechanized their operations. The Auxois and other draft breeds were quickly abandoned in favor of machines, and population numbers began to fall in the early 1950s and collapsed completely in the 1960s. By the 1970s, the Auxois had almost disappeared, although many villages in the breed's homeland retained a small number of mares for traditional competitions.

In the early 1970s, Henry Blanc was appointed as the new director of the French National Stud, and began the conversion of French draft breeds into animals bred for slaughter into horse meat. The stud encouraged farmers who could no longer find buyers for their animals to fatten them for resale to the slaughter markets. Breeding for the production of meat helped to safeguard the Auxois breed by keeping its gene pool intact, but also transformed the previously powerful breed into one bred solely for weight — the main consideration in pricing at slaughter. In 1976, an official French decree changed the name of the category in which the Auxois fit from "draft horses" to "heavy horses" and encouraged farmers to select the heaviest breeding stallions possible, to increase the average weight of the breed. The National Stud approved this change, and between the 1950s and the 1980s, the average weight of the Auxois increased from 650 to 800 kilograms (1,430 to 1,760 lb) to 800 to 1,000 kilograms (1,800 to 2,200 lb) or more.

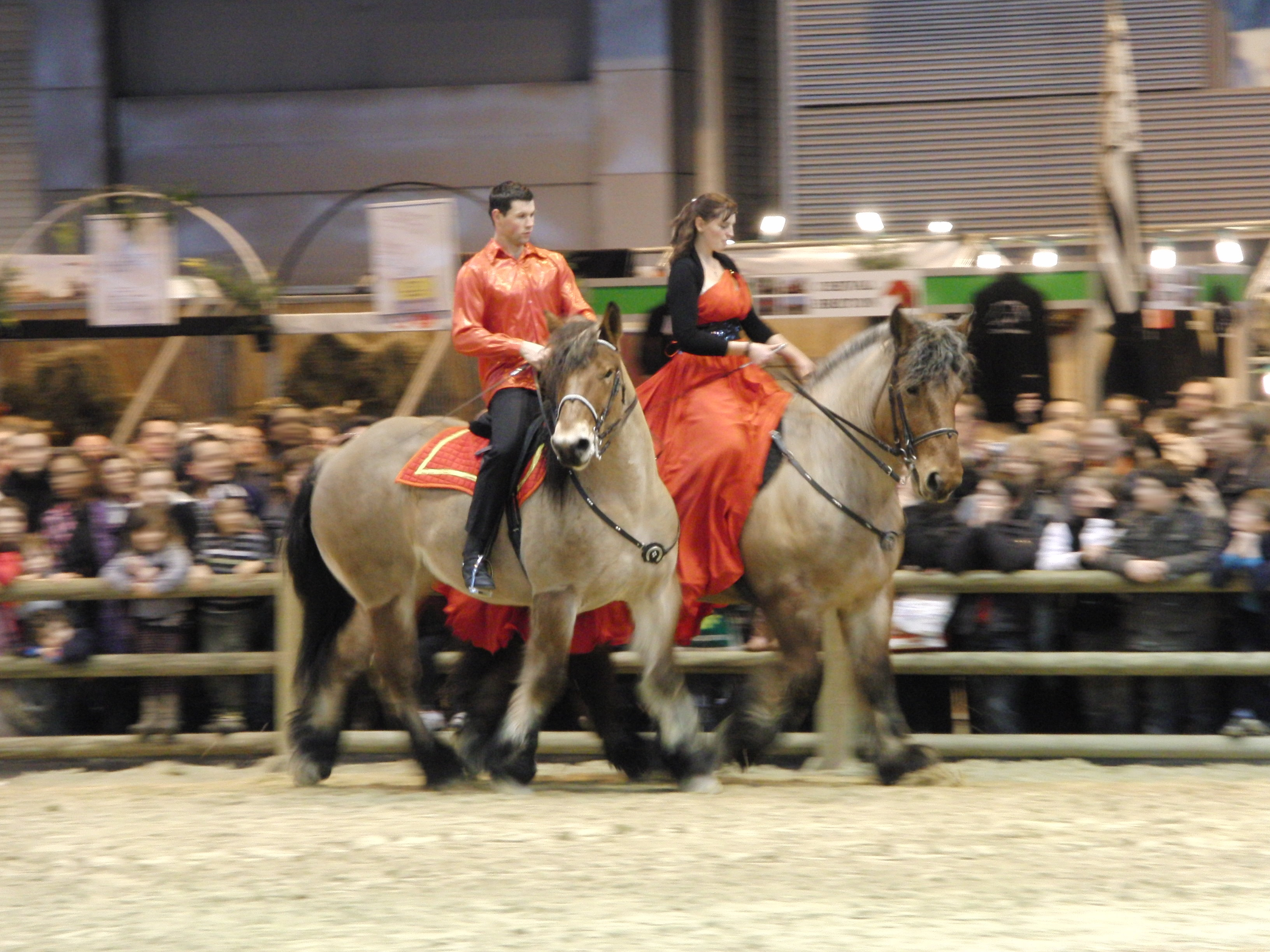
In ridden competition at the 2011 Salon International de l'Agriculture

The conversion to meat was unfavorable for the Auxois, however. The Percheron was preferred for the quality of the meat and the Ardennais and closely related Auxois were considered to have some of the lowest quality meat. In addition, the promised market for horse meat did not materialize, and French slaughterhouses were overwhelmed by imports of cheap horses from the Americas and Eastern Europe. Because of this lack of profitability, the population of most French breeds, including the Auxois, continued to decline until 1994. The collapse in prices then forced the National Stud to redirect its draft horse-related activities.

In the early 1990s, recreational riding enjoyed a revival in France, while the consumption of horse meat dropped. In 1991, the Agricultural College in Semur-en-Auxois began the production of horse milk using Auxois mares in Bierre-lès-Semur. In 1994, the French Official Journal published a decree restoring the name of "draft horse" from the almost 20-year use of "heavy horse". In 1996, another decree prohibited the docking of tails of all French horses. French farmers moved towards the production of animals for recreation or agricultural uses, and the National Stud began supporting this aim. In July 1998, a promotional center for the Auxois opened in Bierre-les-Semur, through regional and departmental grants and using the National Stud to promote the breed. It focuses mainly on the training of young horses for riding and driving, and showcases various performances, as well as providing shoeing services and birthing assistance. In 1999, a study was undertaken of Auxois breeders, which showed opposition to changes in the breed. The author recommended expanding the breed standard to open new markets and save the Auxois from extinction.

=== Present ===
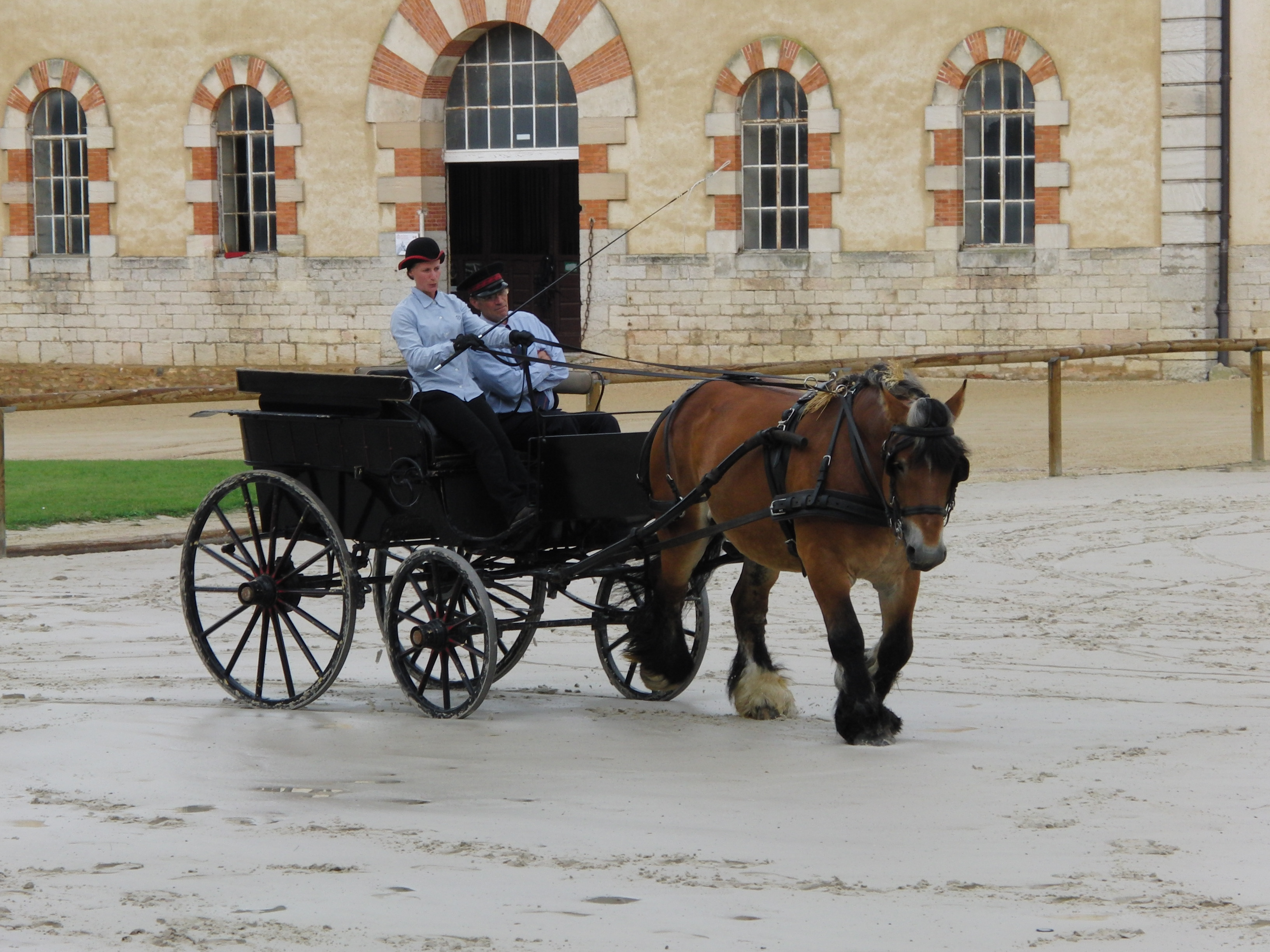
A stallion being driven at the Cluny Stud

As it has been since the creation of the Auxois stud book, only purebred horses and Ardennes and Trait du Nord crosses are allowed to be registered. This is to ensure selection for the desired breed characteristics, which are now a lighter and more active horse than was seen during the time of breeding for horse meat. Horses bred through artificial insemination and embryo transfer are allowed to be registered; those potentially bred through cloning are not. The Syndicat du Cheval de Trait Auxois (Auxois Draft Horse Association) is the national registry, managing the stud book, breed standard and promotion of the breed. An annual breed competition is held in September in Semur-en-Auxois. The Burgundy region continues to celebrate the breed, and there is a museum dedicated to it in Bierre-les-Semur. The Auxois is also regularly seen at the International Agriculture Show in Paris.

The population of Auxois is very low, and it is one of the rarest of the nine French draft horse breeds. In 2001, it had the eighth-smallest population of the nine breeds, making the threats of inbreeding and extinction very real. In 2006, 250 active breeding mares and 32 stallions were reported, with 125 breeders (the term breeder applying to any person owning at least one active breeding mare). The Auxois represented 1 percent of total French draft horse registrations in 2007. Burgundy is by far the main breeding area, with a few horses in the Rhône-Alpes and Auvergne regions. There are no known registered Auxois living outside France and it is almost unknown outside of its home region, even within the rest of France. Of the nine French draft horse breeds, the Auxois is the only one that is not exported. Between 1992 and 2011, between 80 and 146 foals were born each year, with numbers ranging from 105 to 128 between 2007 and 2011.

== See also ==
- List of French horse breeds
