= Trait du Nord =

Breed of heavy draft horse from Belgium and France

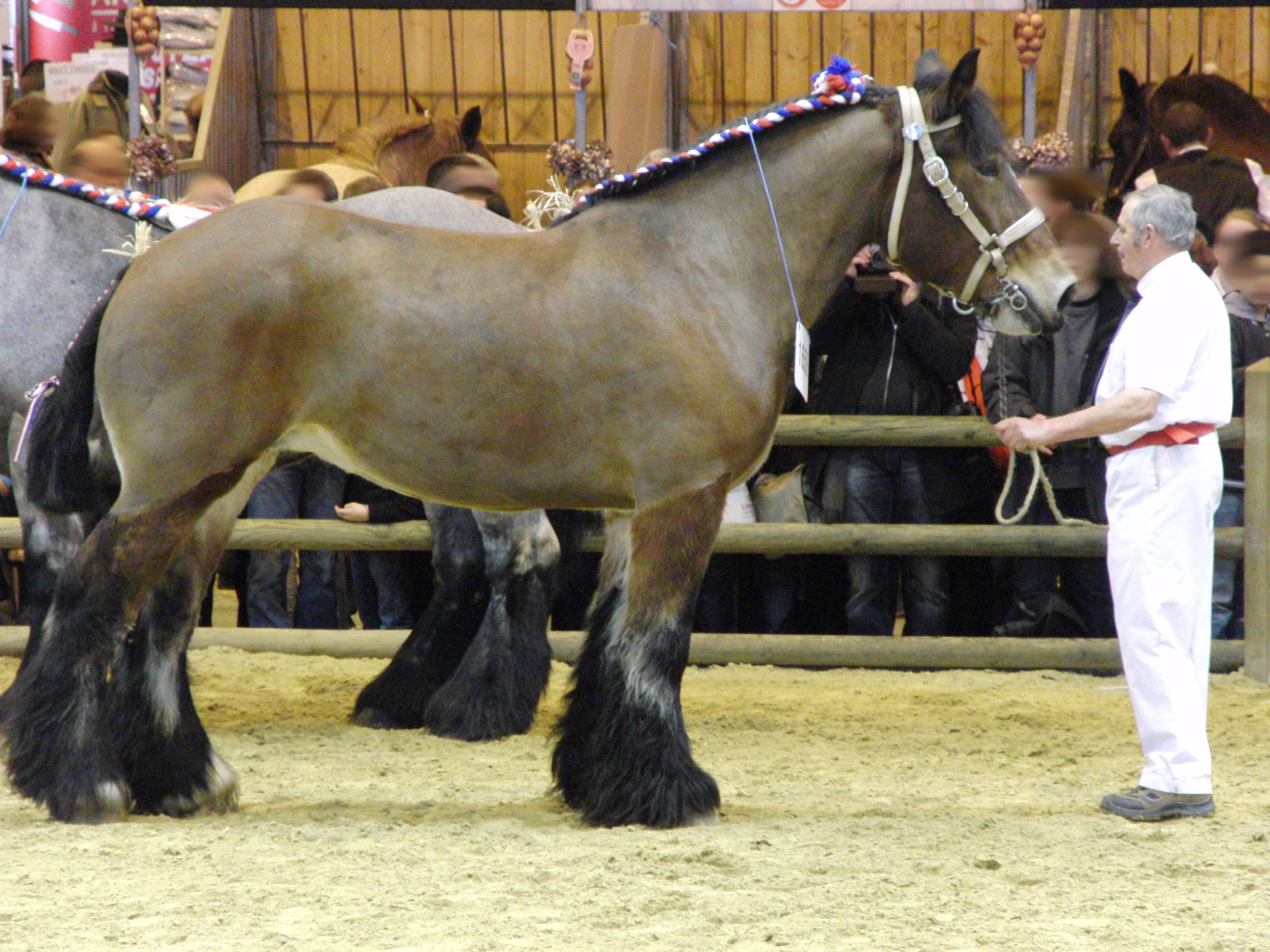
- Other names: Ardennais du Nord
- Country of origin: Belgium, France

Traits
- Distinguishing features: Large, muscular draft breed

Breed standards
- French National Stud

The Trait du Nord, previously also known as Ardennais du Nord or Ardennais de type Nord, is a breed of heavy draft horse developed and bred in the area of Hainaut in western Belgium and in northeastern France. Originally considered a subtype of the Ardennes, it was recognized as an individual breed with the opening of a studbook in 1903. Developed in the fertile Flemish grasslands, it was bred for size and pulling power for agricultural work. By 1855, the horses bred near Hainaut were considered by some veterinarians to be superior to other Flemish draft breeds. The Trait du Nord was used extensively in mining from the late 19th century through 1920, with lesser use continuing through the 1960s.

The Trait du Nord continued to be used extensively for agriculture through World War II, but after the war this usage, and the breed population, declined significantly as farming became increasingly mechanized. During the mid-20th century, the breed was in demand for the production of horse meat, and due to this was bred to be larger and heavier. In the early 1970s, the market for horse meat began to decline, and the Trait du Nord, like many European draft breeds, was in danger of extinction. It was not until the 1990s that the breed experienced a slight revival through an increased interest in recreational riding and driving.

The Trait du Nord is large, with stallions weighing upwards of 1,000 kilograms (2,200 lb), and is bred for traction ability and pulling power. The breed is found in many solid colors, although bay and roan are the most common, and is known to be gentle and easy to handle. Two slightly different types of Trait du Nord are found – a larger type used for heavier pulling and a lighter type used for faster work. The breed is considered to be endangered by the French government, with fewer than 100 new foal births a year. The national breed registry in France is working with local groups in an attempt to promote this breed and bring population numbers back up. The breed currently has a high risk of inbreeding, due to the low number of breeding stallions, and is at risk of extinction.

== Naming and registration ==
According to the French National Stud, the current official name of the breed is Trait du Nord. The name has changed several times during its history. In the mid-19th century it is mentioned as the "large horse of Hainaut", but before 1903 it was not considered a separate breed and was often thought to be the same as the Ardennes. Beginning in 1913, it was known as the Trait Ardennes North, and from 1945 to 1965 was known as the Northern Ardennes Draft. The name of Trait du Nord became commonly used around 1961.

Until 5 August 1903 the Trait du Nord's studbook was merged with that of the Ardennes, with the former being considered a subtype of the latter and called the Northern type Ardennes. The studbook was under the responsibility of the combined group "Studbook of Northern Workhorses". In 1913, the name of Trait du Nord was used for the first time and French mares began to be registered as their own breed, although Belgian horses continued to be used for breeding, with the resulting progeny able to be registered as Trait du Nords. In 1919, the northern type was separated from the Ardennes, although the studbooks remained tied, and the horse was given the name "Northern Ardennes". A centralized breeding union for the Northern Ardennes was created in 1945.

In France, the Syndicat d'élevage du cheval de trait du Nord (Union of Trait du Nord Horse Breeders) is the national breed association recognized by the Ministry of Agriculture and Fisheries. Its mission is to promote the breed and assist in its recovery, as well as creating and executing a policy of genetic improvement through selective breeding. The association works with the French National Stud and the Center for Genetic Resources to develop breeding programs and represents the Trait du Nord on French breed committees. It also organizes and contributes to contests and events that help to promote and develop the breed.

== Breed characteristics ==
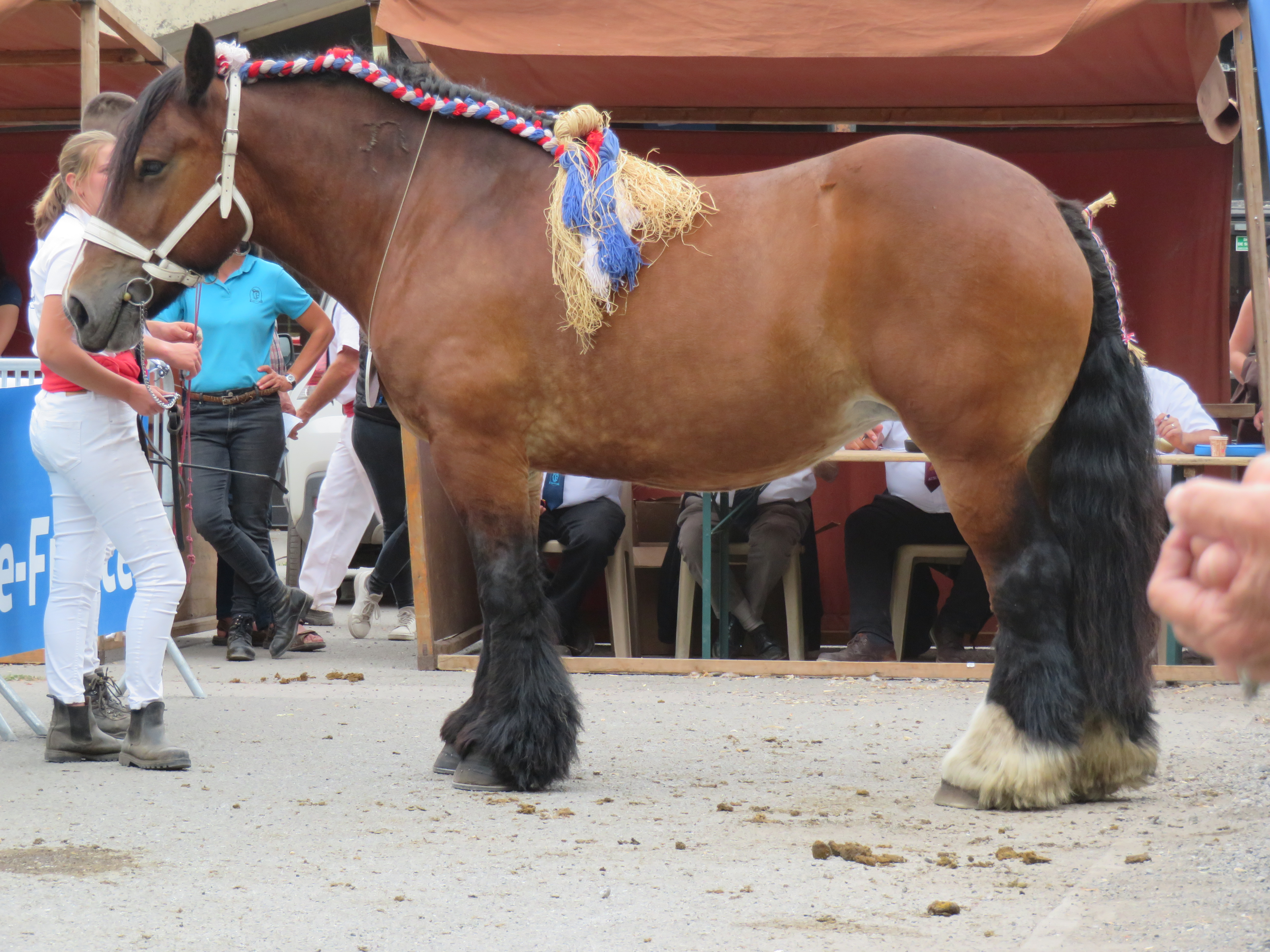
Mare at 2023 National mare competition

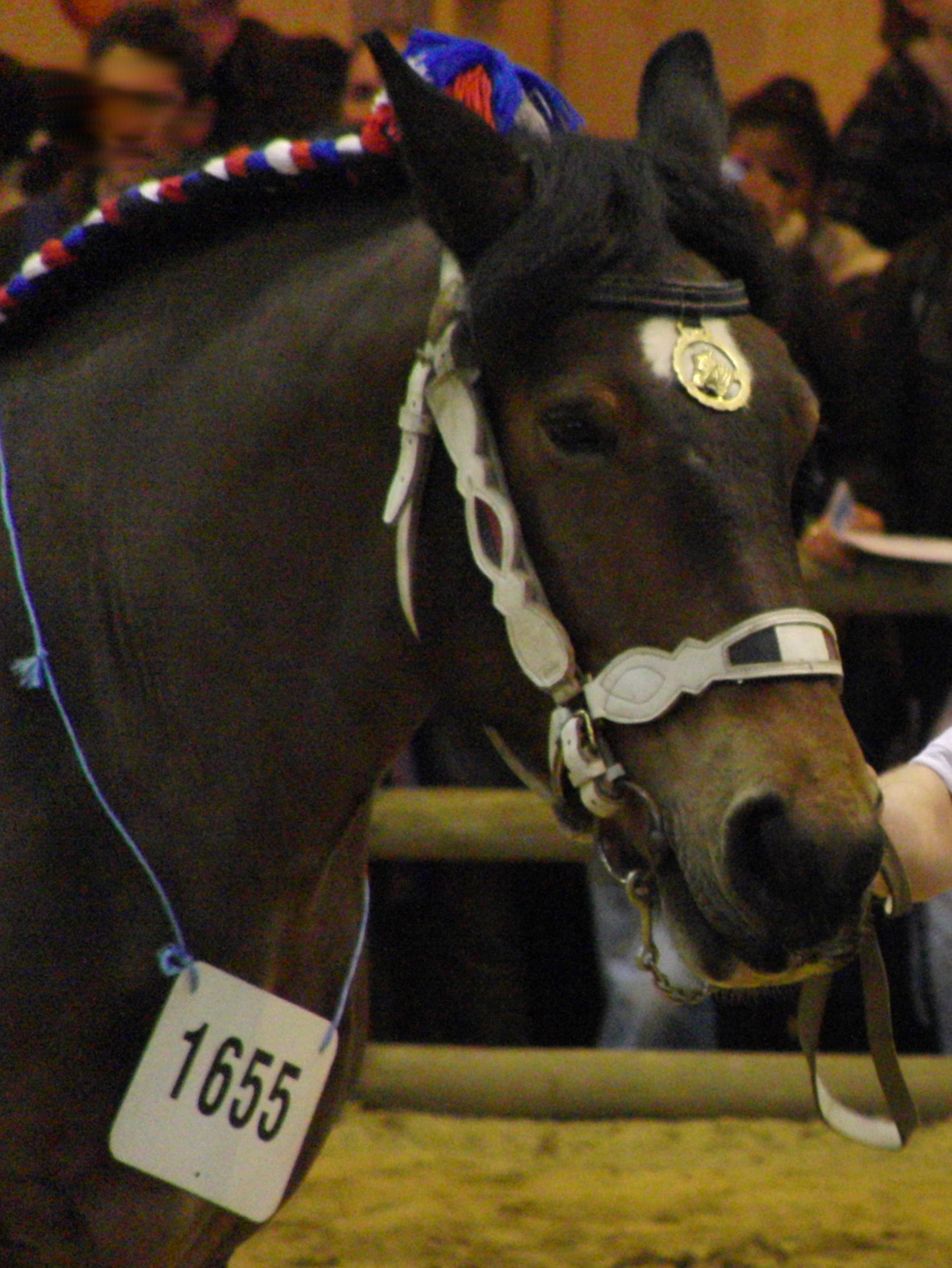
Head of a mare

In the early 1930s, the breed reached the peak of its physical structure. It was then described as a born laborer, built for traction and with a conformation that allowed it to move huge weights over short distances. Although some breeds of draft horses have declined in weight in modern times, the Trait du Nord has remained relatively large. The average size in the breed is 16.1 hands (65 inches, 165 cm) for mares and 16.2 to 16.3 hands (66 to 67 inches, 168 to 170 cm) for stallions, weighing 1,800 to 2,000 pounds (800 to 900 kg) for mares and 1,870 to 2,200 pounds (850 to 1,000 kg) for stallions. Foals of 30 months who are candidates to become registered must be at least 16 hands (64 inches, 163 cm). Bay and roan are the most frequent colors seen in the breed. Chestnut (including liver chestnut, although this color is quite rare) is also allowed, as are black, brown and gray, although the latter is extremely rare.

In France, the National Stud regulates the physical standards of the Trait du Nord and eight other French breeds. The eligibility criteria have changed several times since the opening of the studbook in 1913, and now describe the ideal Trait du Nord as large, well built, short and powerful, with a large frame and well-developed muscles, energetic, with easygoing and beautiful gaits. Members of the breed are described by the breed association as courageous and observant, as well as gentle and easy to handle. The head is generally small in proportion to the mass of the horse, and often snub, with a flat profile (neither concave nor convex). The neck is of medium length and strong, often slightly arched. The withers are prominent and the shoulder long and slightly oblique. The back is short and straight and the body compact, solid and very muscular. The chest is deep, with a broad, muscular breast. The croup is wide and powerfully muscled. The hooves are hard and strong.

There are two main types of Trait du Nord. One is a heavier type bred for pulling heavy loads, while the other is a lighter type bred for slightly faster work, generally at the trot. Auxois, Ardennes, Brabant and some Dutch draft breeds may be admitted to the Trait du Nord studbook after being inspected and approved by a review panel. Registered horses are marked with a stylized "N" brand on the left side of the neck, signifying conformity to the breed standard.

== History ==
The ancestors of the breed lived in the northern river valleys of the Sambre and the Scheldt, near Valenciennes. Although it is a popular myth that many French draft breeds, including the Trait du Nord, are descendants of the prehistoric horses found at Solutré, this is not true. Two or possibly three subspecies of now-extinct equines have been found at Solutré, but there is no evidence that they migrated to the area that later produced the Trait du Nord. Like Dutch and Belgian draft breeds such as the Brabant, the origin of the Trait du Nord is found in the large, fertile Flemish grasslands that cover the southern portion of the Netherlands, northern France and all of Belgium. The Hainaut region is the true birthplace of the breed in France. The Belgian draft breeds, the Ardennes and the Trait du Nord share the same ancestry, and the Trait du Nord has a history that is very similar to the Ardennes, due to the influence of the latter breed on the former. The Ardennes, Belgian, Dutch Heavy Draft, Trait du Nord and Auxois are all considered to come from the same group of breeds, due to their heritage, physical characteristics and selection for draft work. Until relatively recently, the breeds were not differentiated, and were frequently crossbred.

The region of Flanders is particularly conducive to agriculture, and in the 19th century the draining of the swamps and improved farming techniques led to a major expansion in cultivated areas and farm sizes. As there were no existing horses in the area that were suitable for plowing, the farmers found it necessary to create a breed of draft horse specifically for their use. From the 1850s on, farmers selected horses that eventually became the Trait du Nord. The farmers combined large Belgian breeds adapted to swampy ground with the Ardennes and Dutch breeds for size, weight and strength. The result was a muscular, powerful, and tough breed with long legs that facilitated movement. The Trait du Nord was unique in being selected specifically for farming, as many draft breeds were also bred for use in transport.

The Trait du Nord proved a successful breed for the farmers that developed it, and quickly spread throughout the Netherlands, Belgium and northern France. It was given different names depending on the country, and was often confused with and crossbred with draft breeds from the Netherlands, Brabants and the Ardennes. Breed associations began to organize in the late 19th century, and at this point blood from the Boulonnais was introduced to bring more elegance to the breed. The Trait du Nord gradually began to differ from the Ardennes as they gained size and volume and improved their gaits, and the breed became popular in the north and east of France. In 1855, even before the breed had been differentiated from the Ardennes, veterinarians described the heavy horses bred near Hainaut as superior to Flemish breeds.

=== 20th century ===
During World War I, Trait du Nord horses were among those confiscated by Germans from Belgium and France for use in the war. In 1919, these horses were returned to their homeland, allowing the reconstruction of the breed. During World War II, the armed forces used all stocks of fuel, and the draft horse was used to continue agricultural production in France. After the war, farmers quickly equipped themselves with mechanized equipment. The decline in the breeding of the Trait du Nord became noticeable in the early 1950s, and by 1960 breed numbers had collapsed completely. By the early 1970s, breeding had slowed so much that the Trait du Nord, along with other French draft breeds, was in danger of extinction.

As horses were replaced by tractors, the production of horse meat became the main viable market for the Trait du Nord and other French breeds. As the horses were sought for meat, the larger, heavier animals became more in demand, and these horses lost much of their power and pulling ability. A French decree on 24 August 1976, published in the Official Journal, encouraged farmers to select the biggest, heaviest stallions for breeding. The French National Stud backed this decree, and encouraged the breeding of foals that would fatten rapidly, to be butchered at the age of eighteen months. Between the mid-20th century and the 1980s, the average weight of the Trait du Nord increased from between 800 and 900 kilograms (1,800 and 2,000 lb) to over 1,000 kilograms (2,200 lb). Since the early 1970s, the use of the Trait du Nord for meat has declined, contributing to a further reduction in breeding.

In the early 1990s, recreational riding experienced a revival, and the consumption of horse meat continued to decrease. On 11 March 1994 the Trait du Nord was officially declared to be a workhorse again, and in 1996 another decree prohibited docking of tails in horses. Members of the breed are occasionally exported from France, with some going to Italy, Belgium and Germany, mainly for work in logging and pulling brewery wagons. A few are sent to Sicily and Guadeloupe, but this is quite rare.

== Uses ==
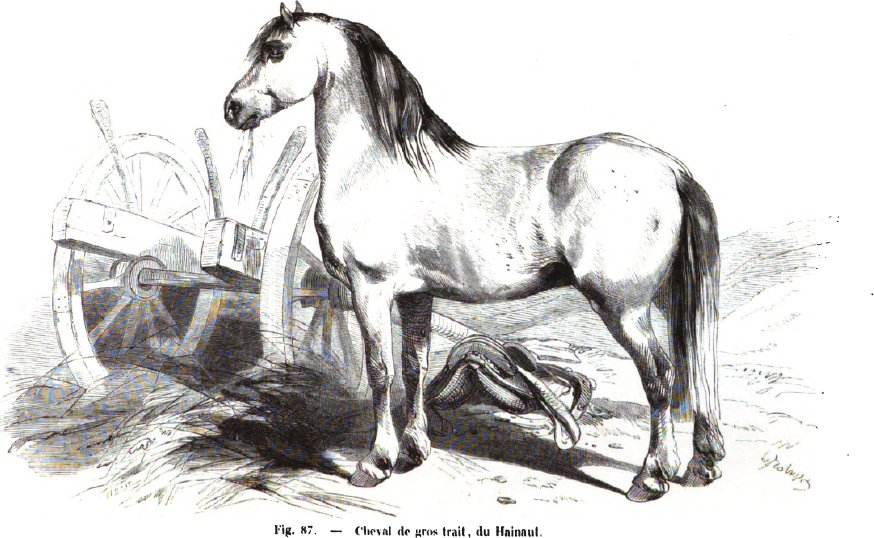
The "large horse of Hainaut" circa 1861

The Trait du Nord was originally used mainly for agriculture and mining. They also towed barges on waterways, although this use ended quickly with the increased use of the engine at the beginning of the 20th century.

The peak use of the breed for agriculture was quite short, running from 1880 to around 1960 (ending due to increased use of mechanized equipment), but it allowed significant progress in agriculture in northern France. The stamina and energy of the breed allows them to perform well in the heavy and compact soils in the region of Nord-Pas-de-Calais and recover quickly after exercise. The nature of soils in Hainaut required a horse weighing more than 1,800 pounds (800 kg) for effective plowing. Since the 1950s, the Trait du Nord has been the preferred breed for farmers who practiced intensive cropping of cereals and beets in the Northern Great Plains of France.

The pulling power of the Trait du Nord made it popular for use during the Industrial Revolution of the late 19th century in heavy industry, including mining. In mines, steam engines and internal combustion engines could not be used due to the possibility of a gas explosion. The first horses were used in the mines in 1821 and the Trait du Nord quickly became a favorite for hauling carts in the mines and operating the pulleys used to lift coal to the surface. Breeders worked to adapt the breed to mining requirements, and the breed became larger as more power was needed to pull heavier loads. Good horses were able to pull 16.8 metric tons (16.5 long tons; 18.5 short tons), usually around twelve cars worth, along a railway. As early as 1920, the usage of horses in mines began to decline as electric locomotives came into use, and in 1969 the last horse was removed from the mines.

=== 1990s and today ===
Today, the breed is used mainly for meat and logging forested areas inaccessible to machinery. Since the mid-1990s, colts not intended for breeding, recreational riding, or harness work are heavily fed and sent out to slaughter before the age of eighteen months. Fillies are generally used for breeding. The breed association and its breeders are trying to secure the future of the Trait du Nord by finding new markets, especially in the areas of recreational riding, agricultural work, recreational and competitive driving. The breed is involved in several reenactments and folk villages which attract good crowds. The breed is promoted for its use in logging in forests and fragile areas, with professional foresters using them to preserve the value and biodiversity of forested areas.

The revival of team driving has prompted farmers who use the Trait du Nord to attend competitions and improve the quality of their horses. The qualities of the breed make it a popular horse for leaders in the areas of recreational and competition team driving, and the breed has the advantage of being able to be immediately returned to work even after a period of inactivity for several months. When being driven, a traditional "Flemish collar" is generally used. The horses are trained to be driven with only one rein, leaving the driver's hands free for other work. When shown in hand, Trait du Nord horses are often presented in groups, generally between four and eight to a string.

Each year, the Trait du Nord is honored at an agricultural show and horse show in Paris. In 1995, the breed won the International Workhorse Trophy at the Paris show and in 2010, a Trait du Nord took the first place prize for weight pulling at the show. Trait du Nord teams participate in the Route du Poisson, a relay race commemorating the route that teams took to bring fresh fish from Boulogne to Paris until the 19th century. The race takes place every two or three years and is the biggest equine relay race in Europe.

== Breed preservation ==
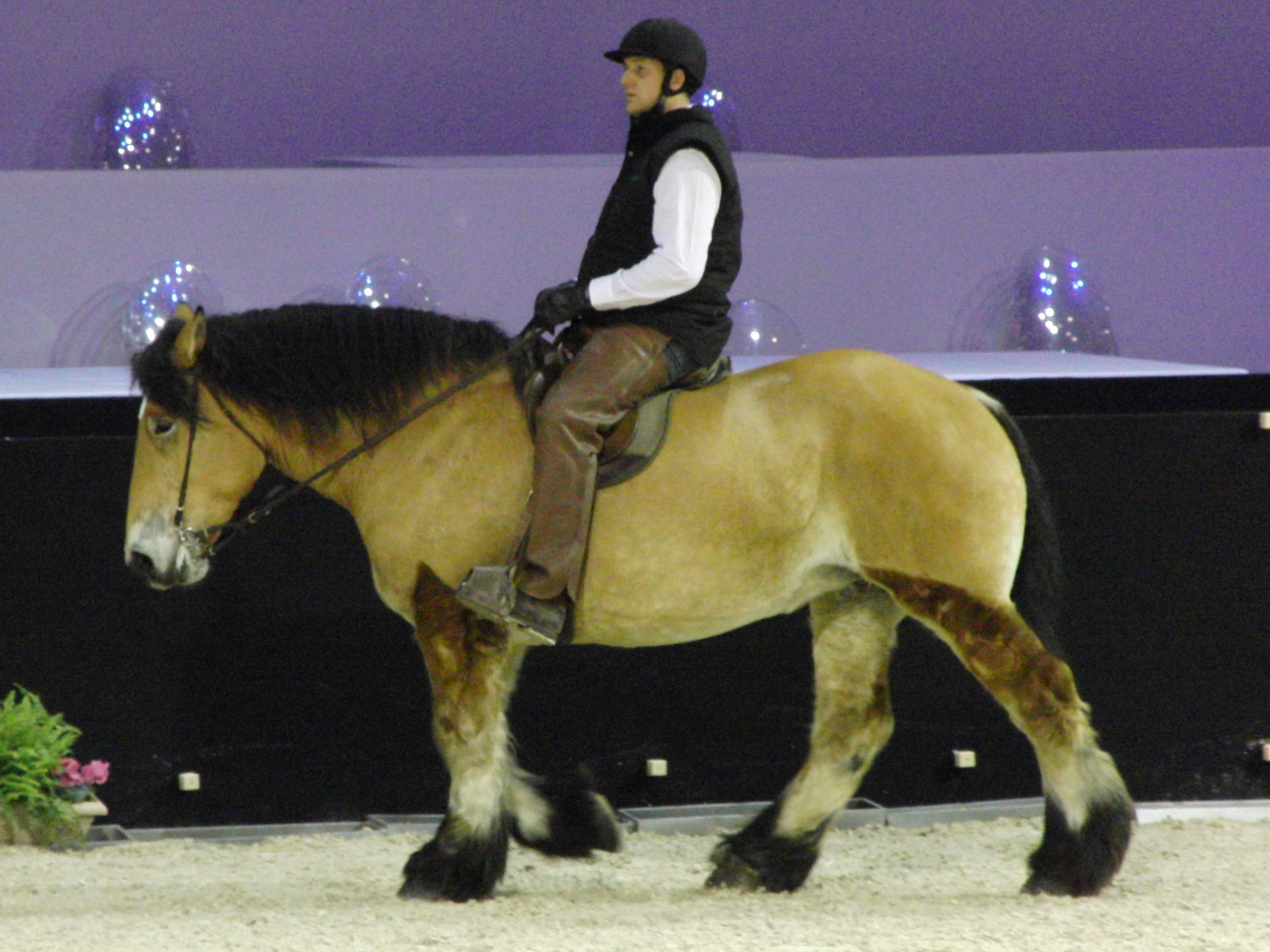
A horse under saddle at a show in 2009

The Trait du Nord is an endangered breed; the Haras de Compiègne (Compiegne Stud), a national stud in France, had a major influence in saving the breed, until it was closed in October 2009. The national breed registry for the Trait du Nord is supported by other local initiatives. However, breed numbers were already low when these initiatives began to be implemented, and media attention on the Trait du Nord is insufficient to maintain economically viable interest. The breed is bred mainly by enthusiasts returning to family farms, but even the number of farms has been decreasing as many young farmers prefer more to breed cattle, which are more lucrative.

Although breed associations and the French National Stud are making efforts to protect the breed, very low numbers persist, and these organizations consider the breed very close to extinction. It is one of the most threatened French horse breeds. The production of horse meat has declined due to a decrease in consumption, and most male foals are neither selected for reproduction nor work. One author says that more alternatives to slaughter are needed and that the steady decline in breed numbers is proof that the breed is slowly disappearing. Beginning in 2011, the Trait du Nord association is working with the North Pas-de-Calais regional council and other groups to increase the number of births by 20 percent by December 2014, and double the number by 2020.

The main breeding areas are located around the former Compiegne Stud and include the departments of Nord, the Pas-de-Calais, the Oise, the Aisne and Somme. A few are found in the central region of Normandy and the Paris area. This breed is found mainly in France and is rarely exported abroad, or only very sporadically with related Belgian and Dutch breeds. A survey of mares in 2008 gave 121 mares in the region of North Pas-de-Calais, 46 in Picardy, 6 in Normandy and one to three mares in the other regions.

Despite efforts to revive interest in the breed, numbers steadily declined in the years before 1988. In 1995, there were 33 stallions in service; in 1996 this number remained the same and by 1998 it had declined to 30. In 2004, there were 111 breeders and 119 Trait du Nord foals were registered. By 2007 and 2008 there were only 17 stallions registered, a number which is exposing the breed to a dangerous increase in inbreeding. To combat this danger, farmers are cross breeding the Trait du Nord with approved Belgian and Dutch horses. The number of farmers breeding the Trait du Nord decreased from 150 to 125 in 2002, then to 92 in 2007 and 86 in 2008. After birth rates remained relatively steady in the 1990s, they began to drop in the 2000s, declining from 176 in 2000 to 100 in 2005 and just 75 in 2007.

== See also ==
- List of French horse breeds
