= Italian Heavy Draft =

Breed of horse

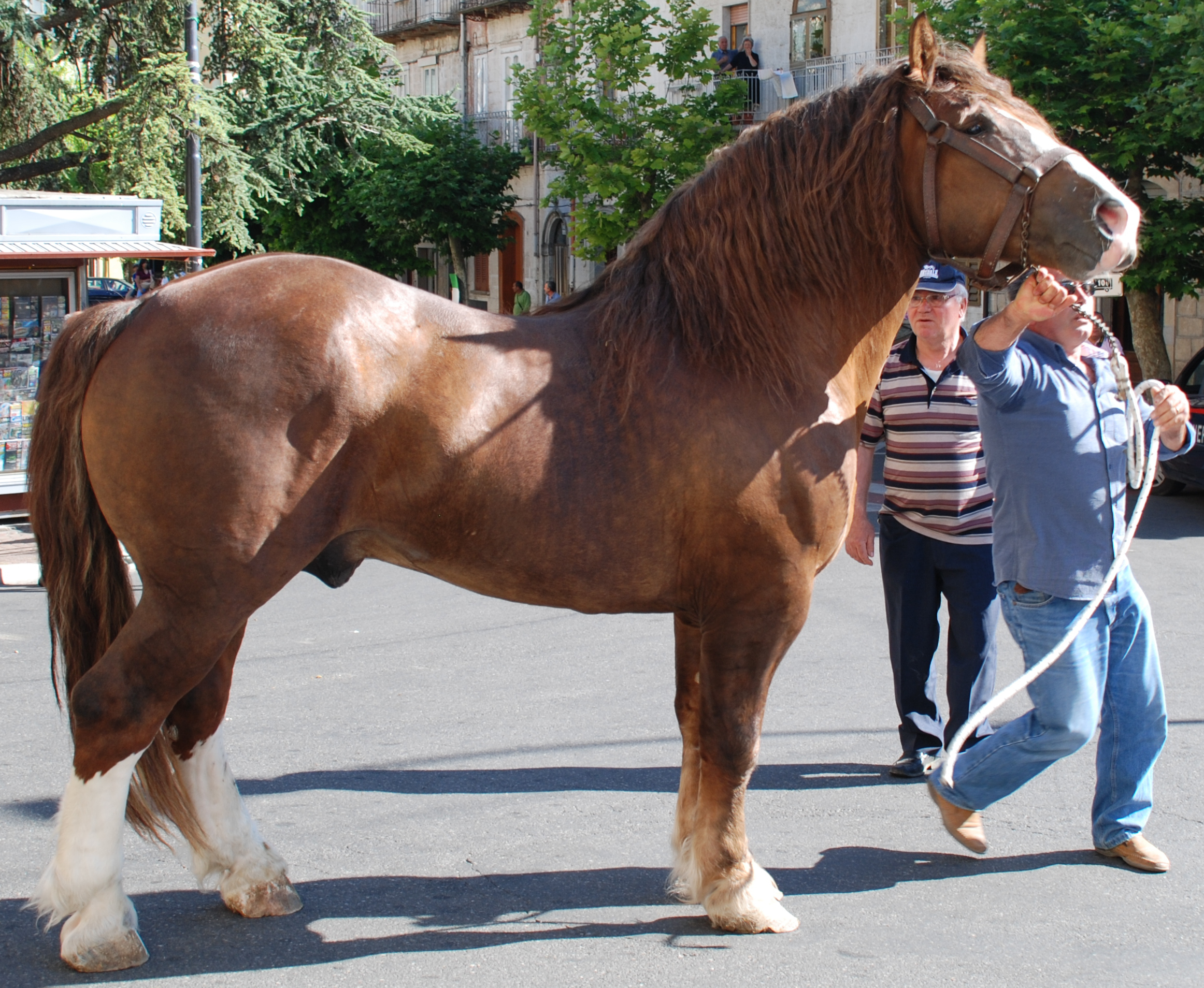

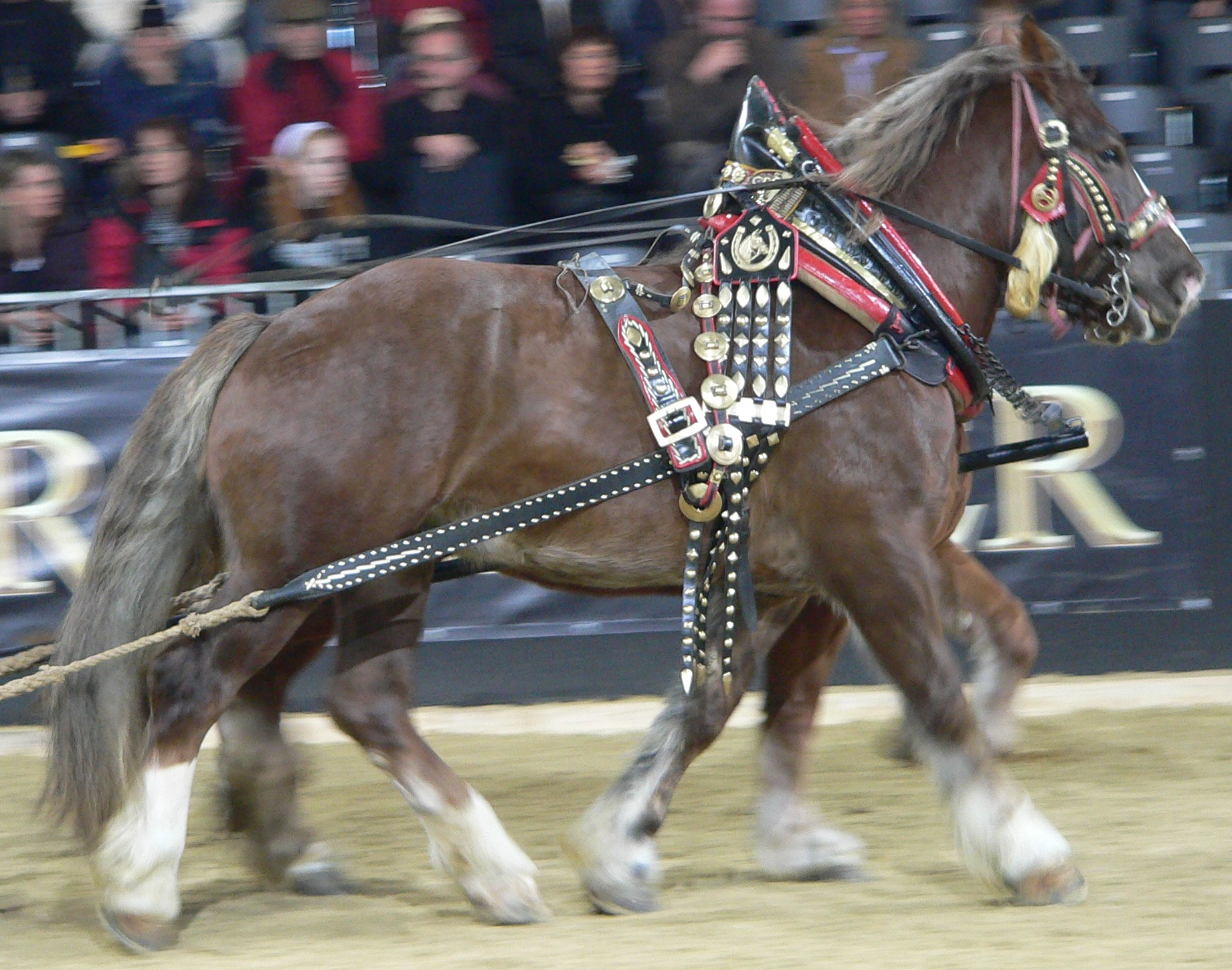
- Other names: TPR; Cavallo Agricolo Italiano da Tiro Pesante Rapido; Rapid Heavy Draft; Italian Agricultural Horse
- Country of origin: Italy

Breed standards
- Associazione Nazionale Allevatori del Cavallo Agricolo Italiano da Tiro Pesante Rapido

The Italian Heavy Draft, or Rapid Heavy Draft, is a breed of draft horse from Italy. The full Italian name of the breed is Cavallo Agricolo Italiano da Tiro Pesante Rapido, "Italian Rapid Heavy Draft Farm Horse", and the abbreviation TPR is often used.

Generally chestnut in color, the breed is known for its combination of strength and speed. Its development traces to 1860 and continued through the late 19th and early 20th centuries as breeders utilized a mix of foundation bloodstock that included native Italian stock and imported horses, all mainly of draft type. Its versatility has led to its use in both agricultural and military capacities, as well as for the production of mules. In 1926, a stud book was formed, and population numbers continued to rise until the beginning of World War II. Breeding programs suffered during the war, and despite care afterward, population numbers continued to dwindle as increasing mechanization decreased the need for draft horses. In the 1970s, selective breeding goals were changed to produce a horse suitable for meat production, which today remains the primary use of the Italian Heavy Draft.

== Characteristics ==
The Italian Heavy Draft generally stands between 14.2 and 15.3 hands (58 and 63 inches, 147 and 160 cm) high, and weighs between 1,320 and 1,540 pounds (600 and 700 kg). They are generally chestnut (usually with flaxen mane and tail), although they may be red roan, or bay. The head is light for a draft breed, with a straight or slightly convex profile, and it is set on a short, broad and muscular neck. The withers are fairly pronounced and muscular, the chest broad and deep, and the shoulders sloping. The back is straight and short, the flanks short and rounded, with a sloping croup. The legs are short, with broad joints and smallish, though well-formed, hooves. It closely resembles the Breton breed, which was used heavily in the creation of the Italian Heavy Draft. Although larger, it also bears a resemblance to the Haflinger, also developed in northern Italy. Horses that meet the breed conformation standards set by the breed registry are branded with a design of a ladder with five pegs enclosed by a shield. Foals are examined twice, at between two and seven months and again two and a half years. Horses passing the first evaluation are branded on the left hindquarter; those that pass the second are marked again on the left side of the neck.

== Breed history ==
Selection for what eventually became the Italian Heavy Draft was begun in 1860 at the Deposito Cavalli Stalloni (military stud) of Ferrara, Italy. The breed was originally developed by crossing native stock with large Brabant horses. While the resulting horses were strong, they were not light or fast enough for the farm work required of them by the Italians. To make the breed lighter and faster, Percheron and Boulonnais blood were added. However, the resulting horse was still not exactly what its creators were looking for, and in the 19th century they added more Breton blood to the mix, bringing the breed to its current conformation and gaits. In 1926, a stud book was begun, and selection processes were developed to select horses for use in draft capacities. The breeding programs suffered during World War II, but a careful crossbreeding program with Ardennes, Percheron and Breton horses after the war brought the Italian Heavy Draft to its current state.

Despite the Italian Heavy Draft's early popularity as a strong but fast draft horse, increasing mechanization in the farming and military sectors reduced the need for all draft horses, and population numbers declined. In the 1970s, selection processes were changed to focus on the production of animals for horse meat, and that has continued to be the primary focus through the present time. In 1976, a breed association was formed in Italy to preserve and promote the Italian Heavy Draft. The association is charged with maintaining the stud book, evaluating breeding stock, granting equine passports, maintaining genetic databases, and exhibiting the breed. The main breeding areas for the Italian Heavy Draft are in the plains and hills around Verona, Padova, Vicenza, Venice, Treviso and Udine. In 2005, it was estimated that there were just under 6,500 Italian Heavy Drafts, about half of which were mares. The registered population at the end of 2010 was 6304, with the largest numbers in Lazio and Umbria; the number of unregistered Heavy Drafts is not reported.

No modern trace remains of the slower Italian Slow Heavy Draft Horse, the Cavallo Italiano da Tiro Pesante Lento, subject of a biometric and morphological study in 1939.

== Uses ==
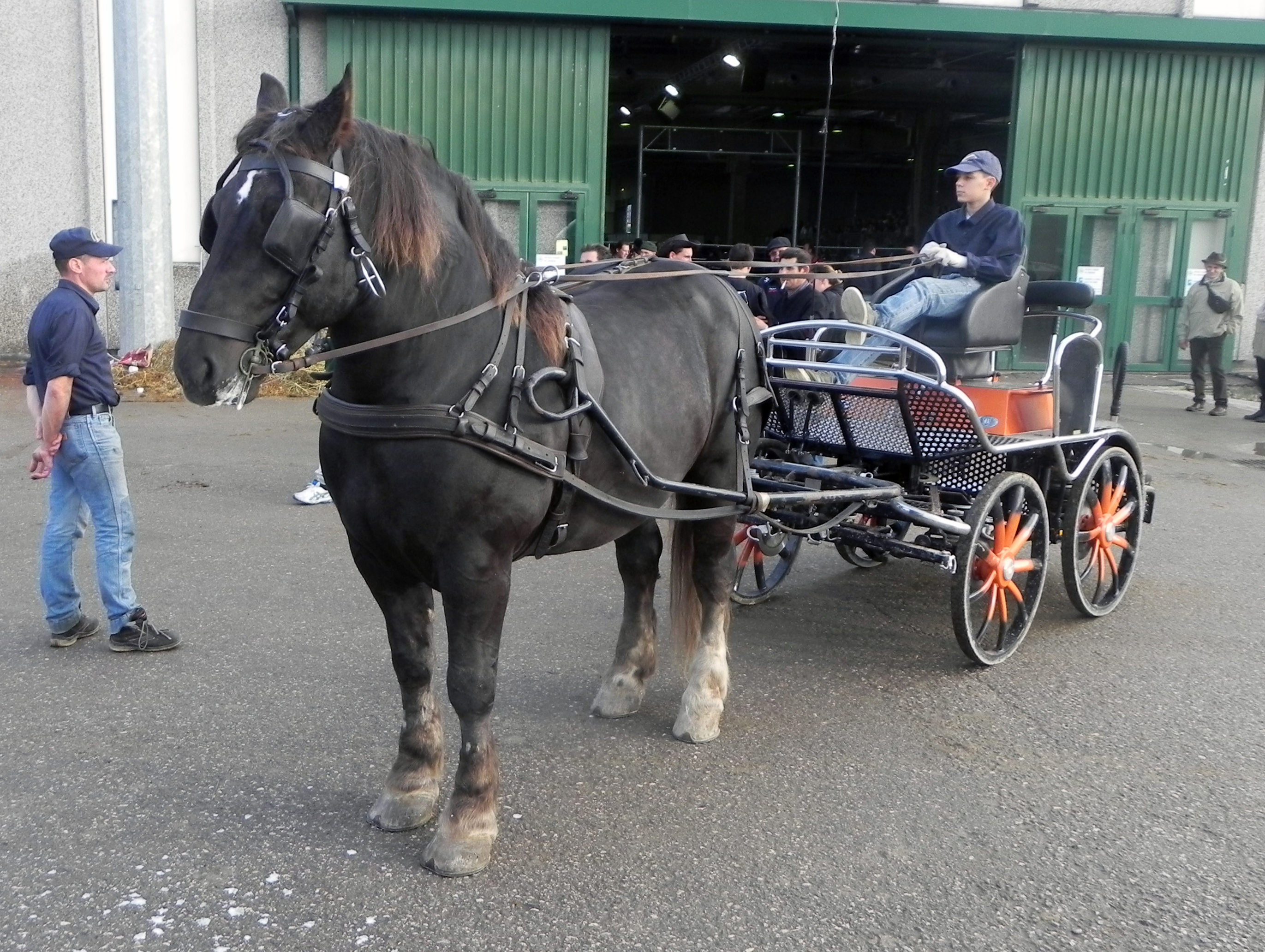
In competition harness (2014)

The Italian Heavy Draft was originally bred to be a versatile horse used in agriculture, urban settings, and military capacities, as well as for the production of large mules for the military. The breed's docility, size, strength, and speed made it extremely useful for Italian farmers before the introduction of mechanization. It is still used for farming in a few areas where mechanization is impractical. The mares are also still used for the production of mules, although most horses today are bred for meat. Italy is one of the top global consumers of horse meat; consumption jumped by 31 percent between 2001 and 2006. Eleven- to eighteen-month-old foals are preferred for slaughter.
