= Ban'ei =

Form of horse racing

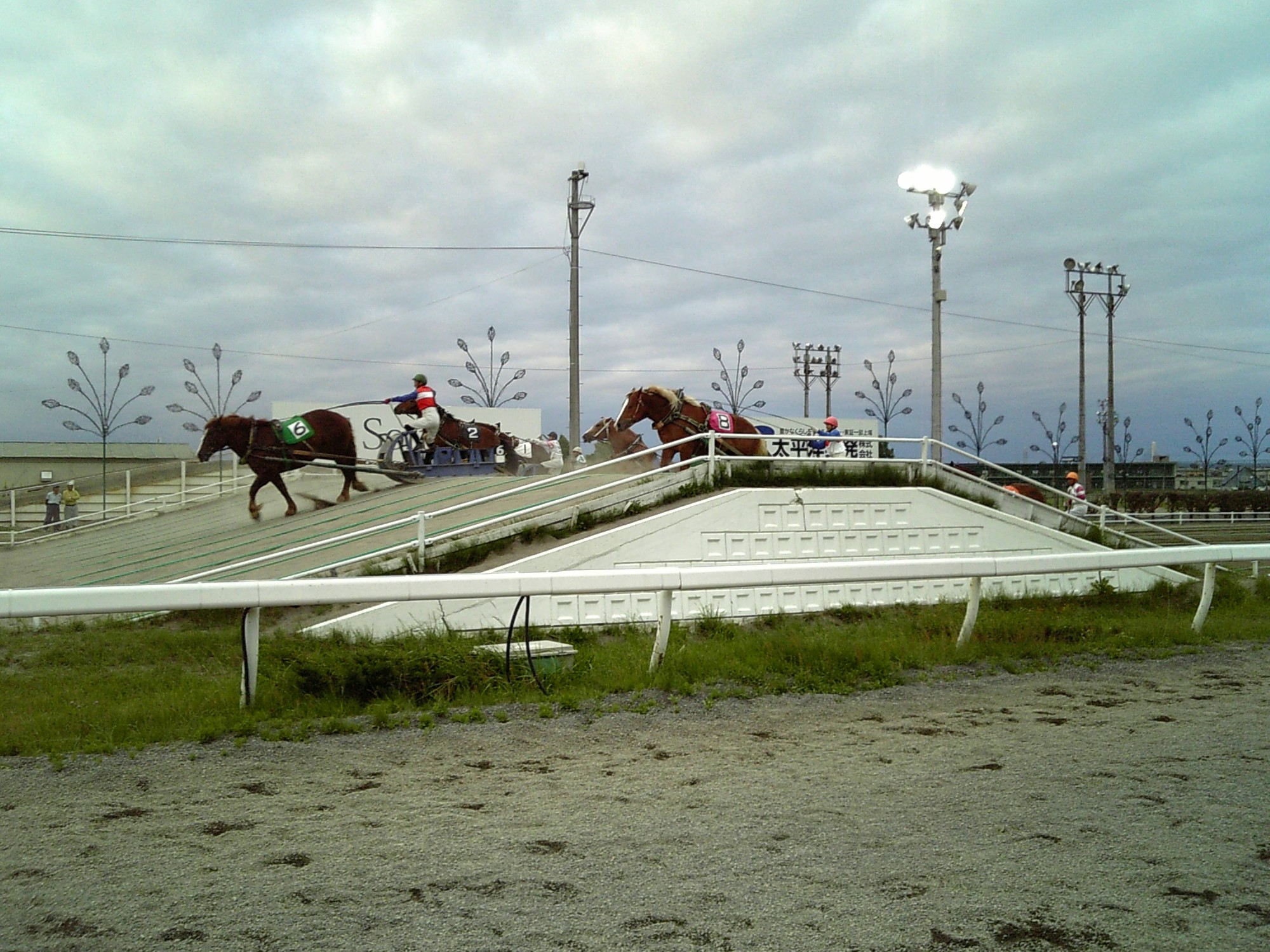
- Highest governing body: National Association of Racing
- First played: c. 1900

Characteristics
- Contact: No
- Type: Horse driving
- Equipment: Weighted sleds
- Venue: Dirt racetrack

Presence
- Country or region: Tokachi, Japan

A Ban'ei race in Obihiro, 2020

Ban'ei kyōsō (ばんえい競走; lit. "pull race") is a form of Japanese horse racing in which draft horses pull heavy sleds up sand ramps, urged-on by jockeys balancing on the sleds. The horses used in the races are often either purebred or crosses of Percheron, Breton, and Belgian breeds.

As the popularity of the races has waned in recent years, regular ban'ei races are only held at the Obihiro, Hokkaido racecourse.

However, betting ticket sales on the Internet have been strong recently, and their popularity is recovering. In 2021, 15 years after it was held in Obihiro alone, gambling ticket sales quadrupled from 2007 sales.

== History ==
Ban'ei racing has its probable origin in agricultural work, when horses were used to pull farming machinery and sleds of wood. Eventually, the horses were tested for speed and strength in festivals of the late Meiji Era (c.1900).

The popularity of ban'ei grew; in 1953, Hokkaido's four cities (Kitami, Asahikawa, Iwamizawa, and Obihiro) began to manage races. The former three closed operations in 2007 due to declining revenues. Obihiro racecourse is now the only one currently active, hosting races most Saturdays, Sundays, and Mondays. Races are also held to mark special occasions, such as New Year's Day, and there are many regional races known as ban'ei koshien.

The Obihiro racecourse nearly closed in 2006 before Softbank, a Japanese mobile phone company, provided funds for the races to continue. Odds Park Cup race, named after the internet-betting subsidiary of Softbank, was established in 2007 as an expression of gratitude. Other companies, such as Rakuten and Sapporo Breweries have added their sponsorship and several support schemes have been initiated, including a race-sponsoring scheme for individuals.

== Overview ==
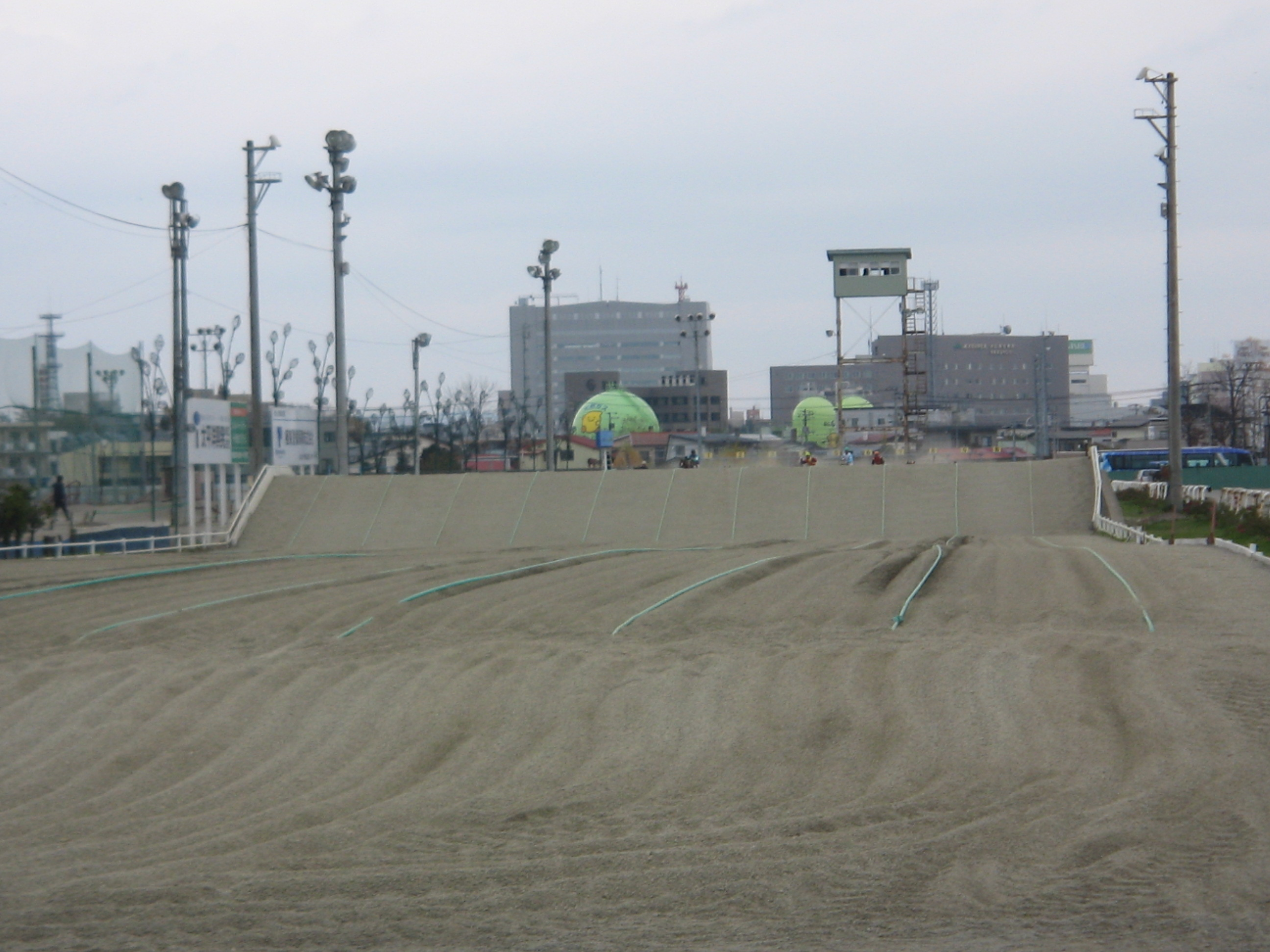
Course separated by lanes

The ban'ei course consists of a 200 metres (660 ft) dirt track with lanes separated by ropes laid in the sand. This creates ten lanes, each incorporating a starting gate and two hill-shaped obstacles. The second and steeper obstacle is called the Ban'ei Point. Horses haul sleds across this track, with the weight of each sled ranging from 450 kilograms (990 lb) to 1 ton, as seen in the Ban'ei Kinen event.

Jockeys stand and balance on the sled, using long reins as a whip and weight slabs under the feet of the jockey in place of a saddle. Each jockey must weigh at least 75 kilograms (165 lb); if the jockey is underweight, slabs are added to meet the smallest weight. Horses are often deliberately stopped after the first obstacle, and given a chance to rest before being ushered to climb the second. A horse has not finished until the entire sled has crossed the finish line.

After the race completes, racehorses are freed from the sleds and led to the back yard, while the sleds are returned to the starting gate with the aid of a trolley. The amount of weight a horse must pull is determined by several factors, with younger horses and mares pulling less than older horses and stallions. A horse's group and rating—which further determines the required weight—depends upon the amount of money the horse has previously earned. Horses compete in groups labeled 1–26, and groups are rated with Open, A1, A2, B1, B2, B3, B4, C1, C2 or D (in order of decreasing winnings). This is like the system used in Japanese thoroughbred racing. The weight allowance of jockeys is either 10 or 20 kilograms (22 or 44 lb), based on the number of wins.

Because ban'ei racing is about strength and not speed, the winning time of major races is often slower than lower-class races, where even a small overtime can have a horse disqualified. With suitable ground conditions, horses pulling lightly loaded sleds can clock speeds under 50 seconds. The condition of the track is described using measured-moisture percentage. The track is repaired manually during or between races. Watering is used to prevent excess dust from irritating horses and people. Heating systems allow racing during the winter months.

== Horses ==
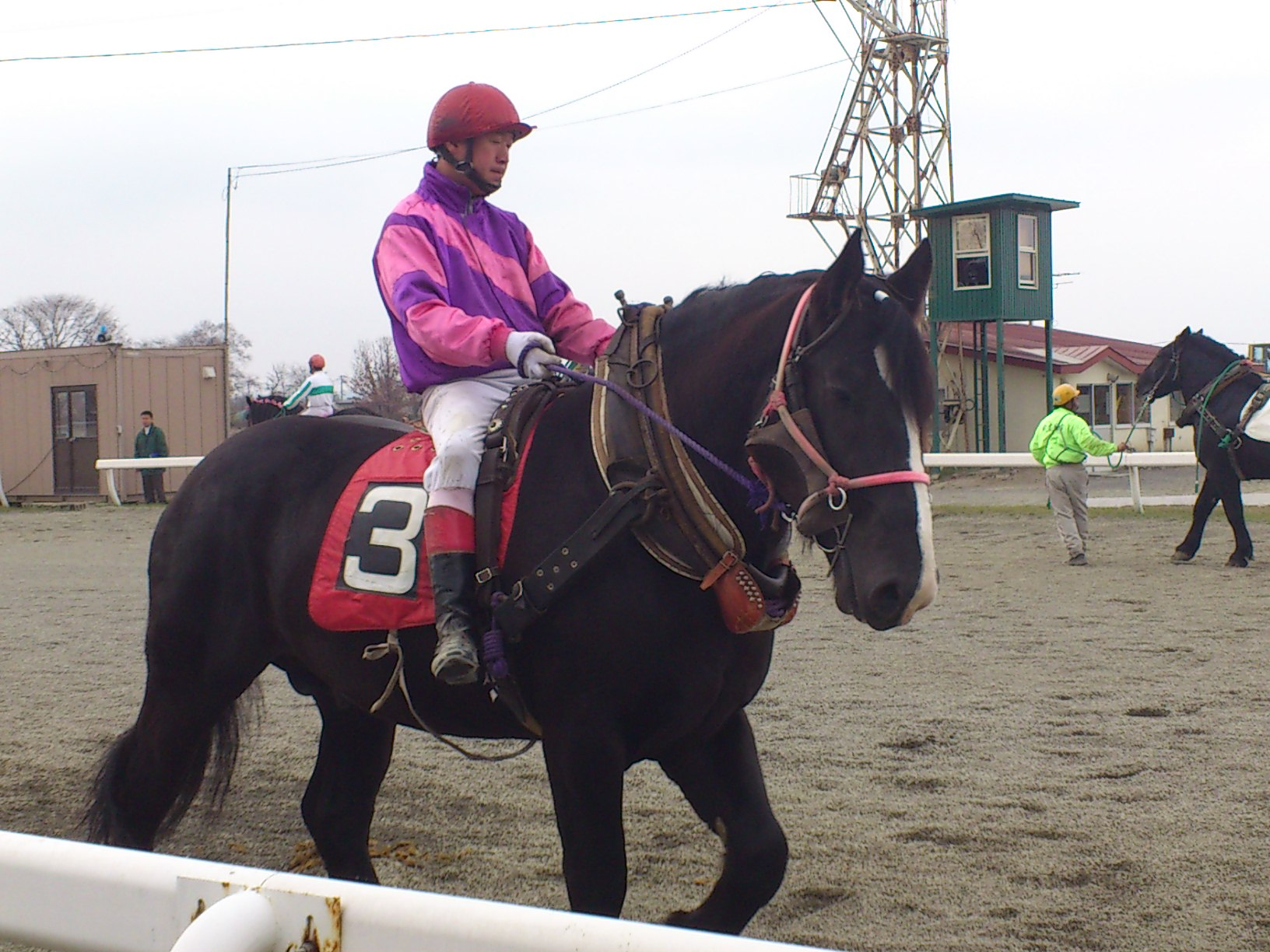
Ban'ei horse on paddock

Horses in ban'ei are often either purebred or crossbred variations of Belgian, Breton, or Percheron draft horses. Their weight can surpass one ton, twice the weight of a thoroughbred.

=== Stock ===
Potential stock is chosen from draft horses raised for meat. Most ban'ei horses start official racing as two-year-olds after passing inspection held between April and August. Regional races ("ban'ei koshien") with finals for yearlings are held in October. Horses that do not pass inspection are either sent back to a breeder as they can be used in events or tourism, or to feedlot.

Competing horses are mainly solid-coloured, but there have also been pinto ban'ei horses and two dominant whites.

Former racehorses not eligible for breeding are usually sold for meat. At the close of every fiscal year during the end of March, prolific retiring racehorses are honoured at their own ceremony. The National Association of Racing (NAR) annually awards the best horse.

=== Japanese draft horse ===
The Japanese draft horse is a breed with open studbook created by crossing purebred and half bred horses together for five consecutive generations. Horses that don't meet this requirement have been registered since 2003 as half-blood draft horses.

Eight draft breeds have been listed as eligible for the breeding program: Ardennes, Clydesdale, Shire, Brabançon, Breton, Boulonnais, Belgian and Percheron. This is not directly comparable to breeding stock available. As of 2015, purebred stallions in stud are Bretons and Percherons, while data about new registrations of broodmares from 2014 indicates that from purebreds, three form most: Bretons, Percherons, and Belgians.

Japanese drafts are used mainly in ban'ei and horse meat production. They are also used in breeding of heavy crossbreds(輓交種) and Japanese Horse. The ideal horse has draft phenotype and "hybrid vigour".

The breed doesn't have any colour or marking specifications. Colours of bay, chestnut, flaxen chestnut, black, gray and variety of roans have been recorded since they also exist in purebreds. In extreme cases, a horse may have multiple facial markings and all legs marked with white. Open studbook policy has led to pinto (piebald) pattern; one female family used in ban'ei can be traced to a single stallion born in 1967, while dominant white seen in two horses was spontaneous, manifesting in 2010. Prevalence of hereditary diseases is unknown, since at least one Western scientific source lists breed as "ban-ei" without hereditary diseases.
