= La Route du Poisson =

Long-distance horse race in France

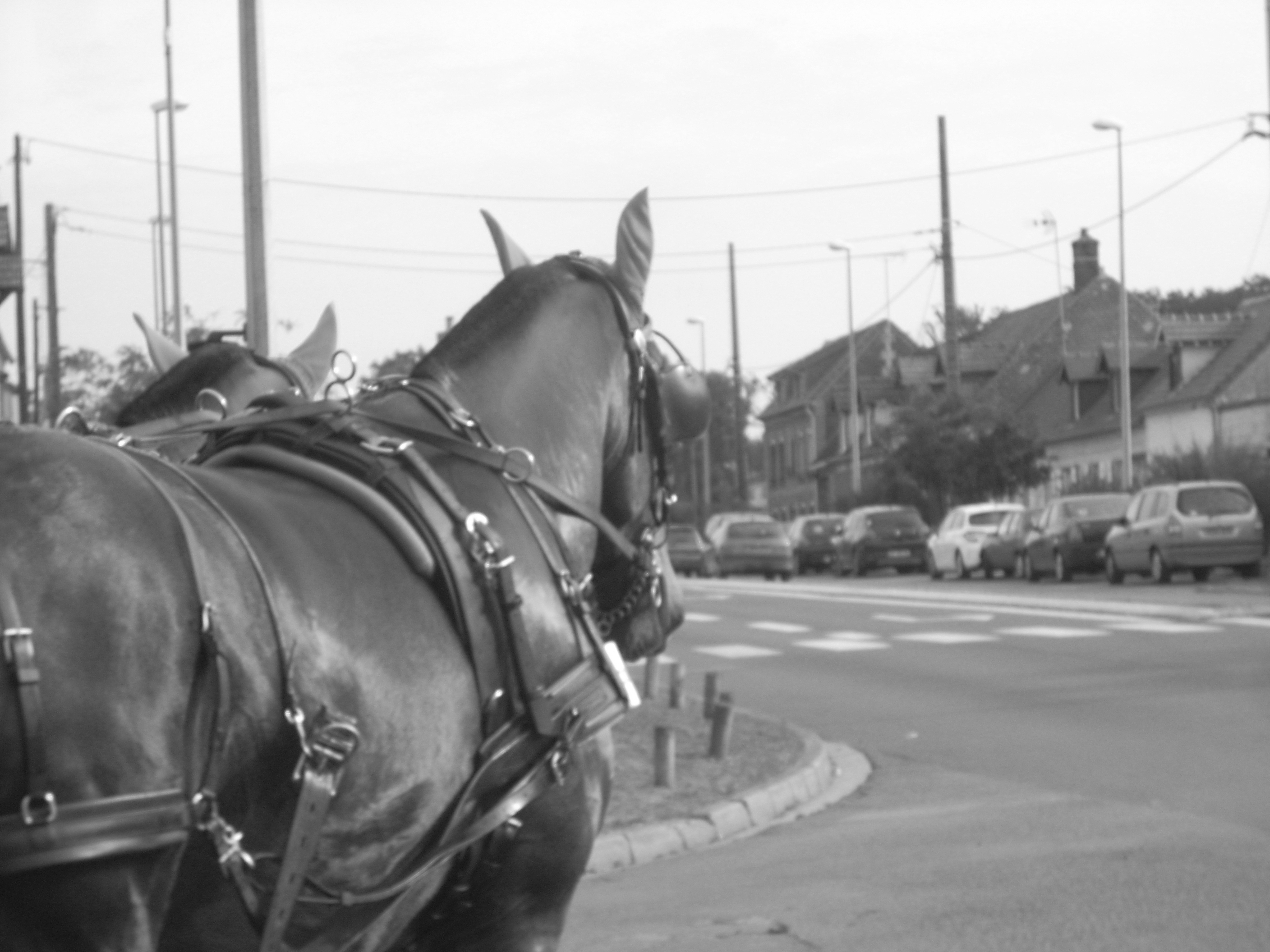
A team of horses during the Route du Poisson 2012 in Lacroix-Saint-Ouen, several kilometers outside of Compiègne

The Route du Poisson is a sporting and competitive horse-driving event between Boulogne-sur-Mer and Paris in northern France.

Created in 1991 thanks to the help of the national haras (stud-horse farms) at Compiègne, this 24-hour competition of endurance is organized in September. It is open to draft horses who, traditionally, transported the fresh fish to Parisian markets before the opening of the railroads. Originally biennial, it became triennial starting in 2005. The largest horse-driving competition of its kind in Europe, it attracts about 300,000 spectators and is distinguished by the displays of the power and versatility of the draft horses, including the traction of small boats.

== History ==
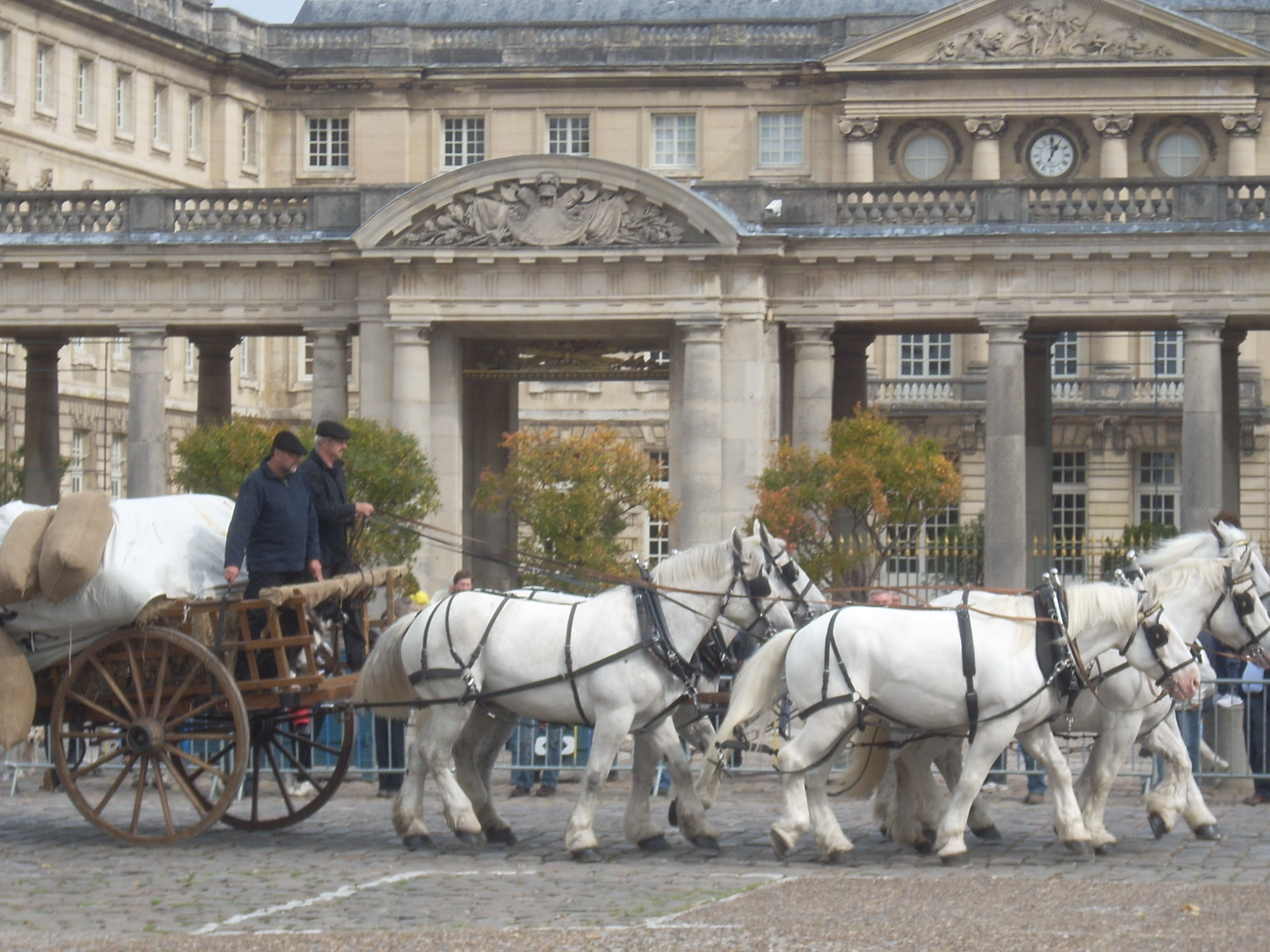
Reenactment of driving fishery carts, in Compiègne in 2012

The Route du Poisson has its origins in a historic function of draft horses since the Middle Ages, bringing fresh fish from the coasts to large cities. The ports of the English Channel, such as Boulogne-sur-Mer, supplied Paris among other things. Horses were harnessed, alone, in pairs, or in teams of four or even five, to two-wheeled carriages. They were led by the fishmongers called chasse-marées (literally, "tide chasers"). They transported fresh fish in less than 24 hours in large baskets protected by algae. To preserve it better, the fish was wrapped in ice, which greatly increased the load to be towed. A four-horse team could pull up to 3.5 tonnes. The tide chaser had to take turns with his horses every 28 km, but the relays were often doubled. Between the seventeenth and eighteenth centuries, the wholesalers transported fish between the fishing port of Boulogne-sur-Mer and the fishmongers' stalls in the markets of Paris. They needed strong horses capable of covering long distances quickly without fatigue. The activity of tidal hunting ended on the road to Paris with the arrival of the railroad in the middle of the nineteenth century.

The re-creation of this old route was proposed in 1989 by a group of amateur historians passionate about the era of tide hunting. In 1991, this project was accepted by the director of the national stud farm of Compiègne, Bruno Pourchet, to save the Boulonnais, an emblematic draft horse of Nord-Pas-de-Calais and Picardy. The region is also known for the draft breed called the trait du Nord.

The tenth edition of the race, in 2012, ran into financial problems. The 2015 contest might be the last one.

== Course ==
La Route du Poisson is both an exhibition and a competition. The course runs through stages of about 15 kilometers, with veterinary checks. The flobart handling and traction tests bring additional points to the teams. The race is above all an endurance test, in traction at the trot.

== Events ==
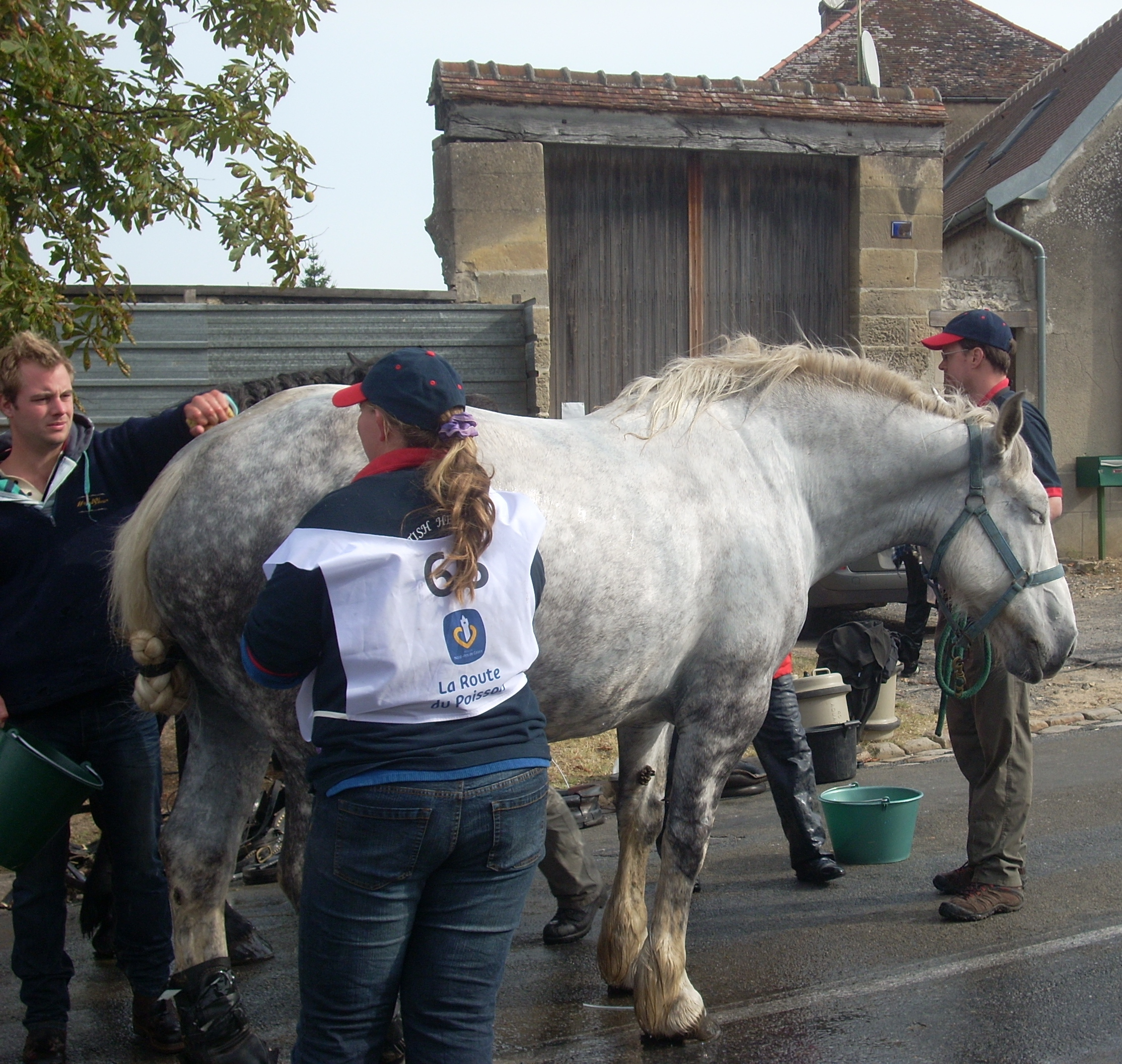
Veterinary checks at Lacroix-Saint-Ouen, during the Route du Poisson 2012

The Boulonnaise team won the race in 1991, 2001, 2003 and 2005. In the last several runnings of the race, the Route du Poisson has attracted about 300,000 spectators.

The first event in 1991 rallied Boulogne-sur-Mer to La Courneuve, and brought together 150 draft horses, for a course of 240 km. Seven teams participate, the French teams in priority, but also a Swiss team and a German one. This first edition ends with a large costumed parade to the Halles district in Paris, for a symbolic distribution of fish to local restaurateurs. This first running of the race brought heavy media coverage, and more than 200,000 spectators along the route.

The 2008 race ran from Boulogne-sur-Mer to Chantilly, from 18 to 21 September.

The 2012 edition took place from 20 to 23 September, connecting the port of Capécure in Boulogne-sur-Mer to the Place du Palais de Compèigne. A team from Perche, Burgundy, Switzerland, Brittany, a British team, and two Belgian teams take part, among others. The 2012 event features a marathon and manoeuvrability (at Conty), a parade at Samer, and a flobart pull at Boulogne-sur-Mer. The awards ceremony took place on Sunday afternoon, the 23rd, at the same time as a show in Conty. The event was won by the Belgian team of traits de la Famenne. According to the Compiègne team who can, this event attracted a large audience but did not fascinate the Compiégnois, in particular because of an arrival too early in the morning, of a closure at the beginning of Sunday afternoon, and the impatience of motorists.

Due to funding issues, the 2015 edition was greatly shortened, as it links Boulogne to Saint-Valery-sur-Somme, with some events in Conty.

The race was revived in 2022. 1,400 contestants signed up for the six day event. The final event was a 24-hour endurance relay race of draft horses, covering nearly 300 km in 20 stages. More than 300 horses left Boulogne-sur-Mer towards the finish line on the Champs-Élysées.
