= Banei, Budaun =

Village in Budaun, Uttar Pradesh

Banei
- village
- Location in Uttar Pradesh, India Banei (India)
- Coordinates: 28.13°N 79.11°E
- Country: India
- State: Uttar Pradesh
- District: Badaun

Government
  - Body: Gram panchayat

Population (2011 Census of India)
  - Total: 4,286

Languages
  - Official: Hindi
- Time zone: UTC+5:30 (IST)
- PIN: 243601
- Vehicle registration: UP 24

Banei is a village and gram panchayat in Salarpur block, Budaun district, Uttar Pradesh, India. Its village code is 128241. According to 2011 Census of India, the total population of the village is 4,286, out of 2,233 are males and 2,053 are females.
