= Ban'ei Kinen =

Japanese horse race

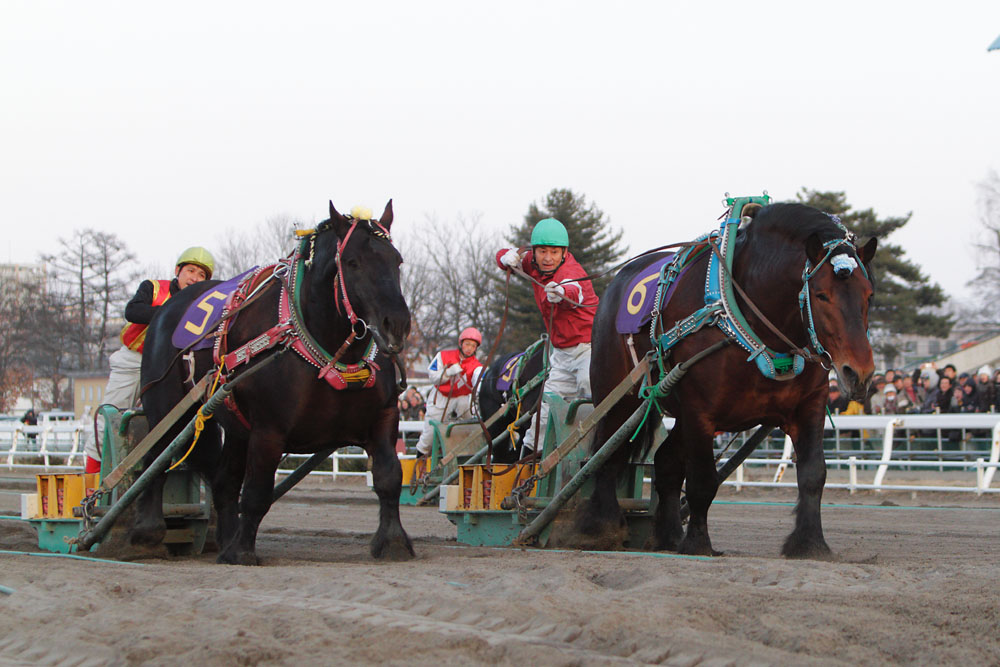
- Goal contest between Kanesa Black (left) and Nishiki Daijin (right) in the 42nd Ban'ei Kinen in 2010
- Class: Ban'ei Grade 1
- Location: Obihiro Racecourse
- Inaugurated: 1968
- Race type: Ban'ei
- Website: www.banei-keiba.or.jp

Race information
- Distance: 200 meters (About 1 furlongs)
- Surface: Dirt
- Track: Ban'ei Track
- Qualification: 4 years old or upper, Ban'ei
- Weight: Weight-for-age (4yo or 5yo: 990kg, 6yo or upper: 1,000kg; -20kg for mare)
- Purse: ¥10,000,000 (as of 2022)

The Ban'ei Kinen (ばんえい記念) is a Grade 1 Ban'ei horse race, held in Obihiro, Hokkaido, Japan for four-year-olds and up. The full name is Nōrin Suisan Daijin Shōten Ban'ei Kinen (農林水産大臣賞典 ばんえい記念) (Minister of Agriculture, Forestry and Fisheries Award, Ban'ei Kinen).

The race is the championship race held at the end of the season (March), with the highest weight and prize money among all ban'ei races. The race was initially held in Kitami, Asahikawa, Iwamizawa and Obihiro on a rotating basis. In 1988 the Ban'ei Kinen was fixed at Obihiro.

The winning time is rarely less than three minutes and it many cases it can take 3–4 minutes. In some cases, the winning time can be 5 minutes or more. The Ban'ei Kinen has one of the longest average finishing times of Japan's public competitions. (Note: In Japanese horse racing, excluding Ban'ei, the winning time of the Nakayama Grand Jump is the longest (about 4 minutes 50 seconds - 5 minutes). Excluding Ban'ei and steeplechase, the Stayers Stakes is the longest (about 3 minutes 45 seconds - 50 seconds).) Since 1977, there have only been six times (1979, 1980, 1992, 2012, 2021, and 2022) that the winning time was less than 3 minutes. Due to this, the Ban'ei Kinen is sometimes called "the world's longest 1 furlong race".

== Winners since 2001 ==
Year	Winner	Jockey	Trainer	Time
2001	Sakano Taison	Kazuo Okawara	Haruo Nishimura	3:42.3
2002	Sakano Taison	Takumi Fujimoto	Haruo Nishimura	4:16.4
2003	Super Pegasus	Toshiharu Iwamoto	Eito Otomo	4:19.8
2004	Super Pegasus	Toshiharu Iwamoto	Eito Otomo	3:07.8
2005	Super Pegasus	Shunichi Fujino	Eito Otomo	3:15.3
2006	Super Pegasus	Shunichi Fujino	Eito Otomo	4:36.1
2007	Tomoe Power	Toichi Sakamoto	Hirofumi Matsui	4:50.6
2008	Tomoe Power	Hiromi Nishi	Hirofumi Matsui	5:35.8
2009	Tomoe Power	Hiromi Nishi	Hirofumi Matsui	4:50.8
2010	Nishiki Daijin	Shunichi Fujino	Isamu Kaneta	4:24.8
2011	Kanesa Black	Michiaki Matsuda	Hirofumi Matsui	4:07.7
2012	Nishiki Daijin	Keisuke Suzuki	Shinichi Murakami	2:34.0
2013	Kanesa Black	Michiaki Matsuda	Hirofumi Matsui	3:43.1
2014	Infinity	Tatsuya Asada	Isamu Kaneda	4:13.2
2015	Kitano Taisho	Kazuo Okawara	Yoshiyuki Hattori	3:49.9
2016	Fuji Dai Victory	Michiaki Matsuda	Akihiko Kanayama	3:41.5
2017	Oreno Kokoro	Keisuke Suzuki	Shigeto Tsukitate	4:07.6
2018	Oreno Kokoro	Keisuke Suzuki	Shigeto Tsukitate	3:59.3
2019	Sengo Quace	Atsushi Kudo	Shigeto Tsukitate	3:35.0
2020	Oreno Kokoro	Keisuke Suzuki	Shigeto Tsukitate	4:16.0
2021	Hokusho Masaru	Takeomi Abe	Toichi Sakamoto	2:43.4
2022	Mejiro Goriki	Kenichi Nishi	Hirofumi Matsui	2:47.2
2023	Memrobosap	Takeomi Abe	Toichi Sakamoto	3:34.4
2024	Mejiro Goriki	Keisuke Suzuki	Hirofumi Matsui	2:55.0
2025	Memrobosap	Watarai Shinro	Toichi Sakamoto	2:17.5
