= Boulonnais horse =

Heavy draft horse breed originating in France

Boulonnais
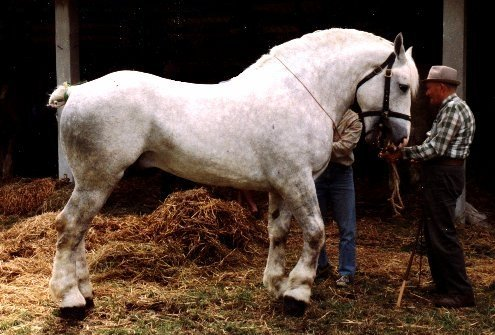
- Young Boulonnais stallion

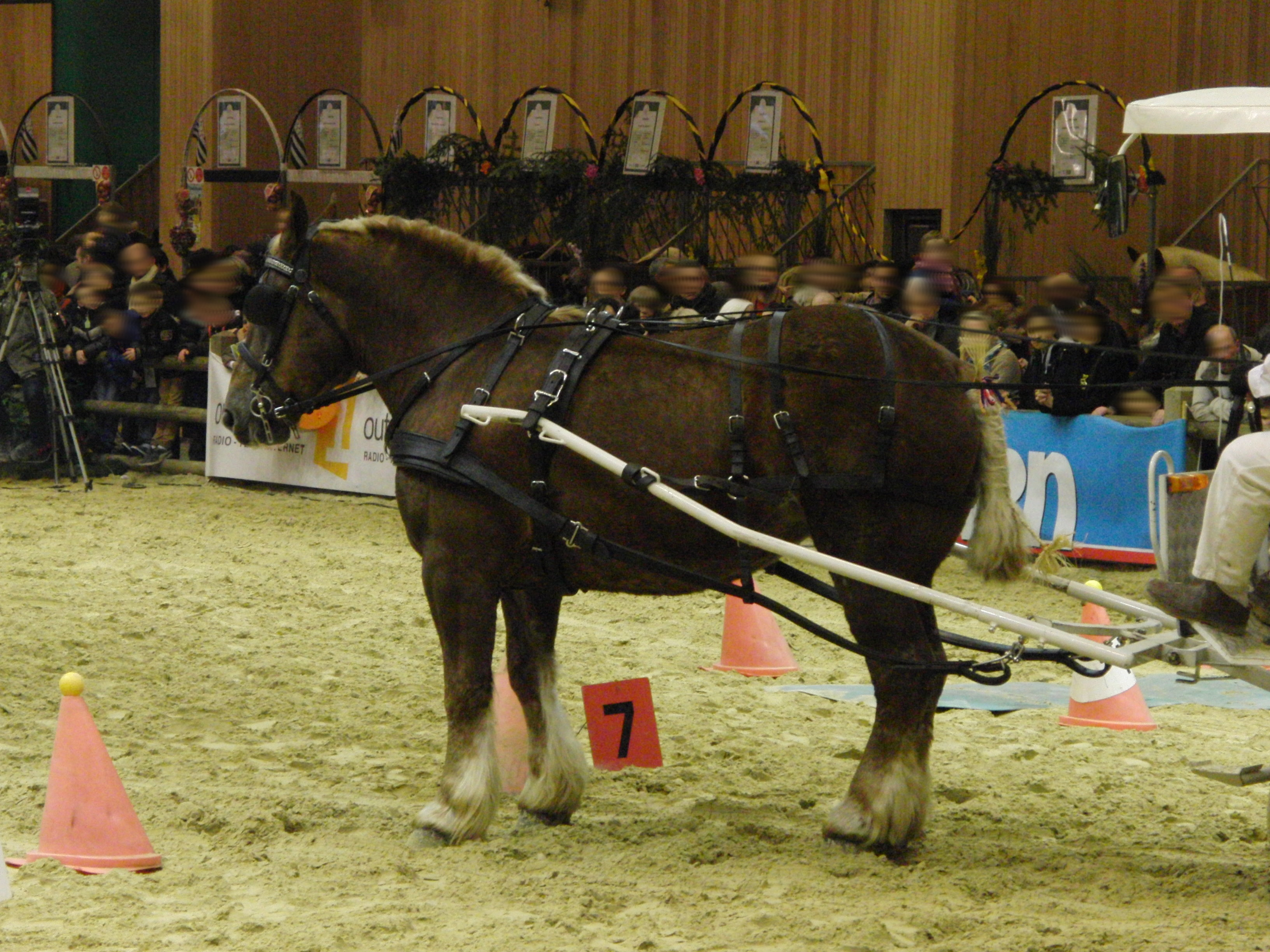
- Country of origin: France

Traits
- Distinguishing features: Elegant heavy horse, found in many colors

Breed standards
- Les Haras Nationaux (French National Stud)

The Boulonnais, also known as the "White Marble Horse", is a draft horse breed. It is known for its large but elegant appearance and is usually gray, although chestnut and black are also allowed by the French breed registry. Originally there were several sub-types, but they were crossbred until only one is seen today. The breed's origins trace to a period before the Crusades and, during the 17th century, Spanish Barb, Arabian, and Andalusian blood were added to create the modern type.

During the early 1900s, the Boulonnais were imported in large numbers to the United States and were quite popular in France; however, the European population suffered severe decreases during 20th-century wars. The breed nearly became extinct following World War II, but rebounded in France in the 1970s as a popular breed for horse meat. Breed numbers remain low; it is estimated that fewer than 1,000 horses remain in Europe, mostly in France, with a few in other nations. Studies as early as 1983 indicated a danger of inbreeding within the Boulonnais population, and a 2009 report suggested that the breed should be a priority for conservation within France. The smallest type of Boulonnais was originally used to pull carts full of fresh fish from Boulogne to Paris, while the larger varieties performed heavy draft work, both on farms and in the cities. The Boulonnais was also crossbred to create and refine several other draft breeds.

== Breed characteristics ==
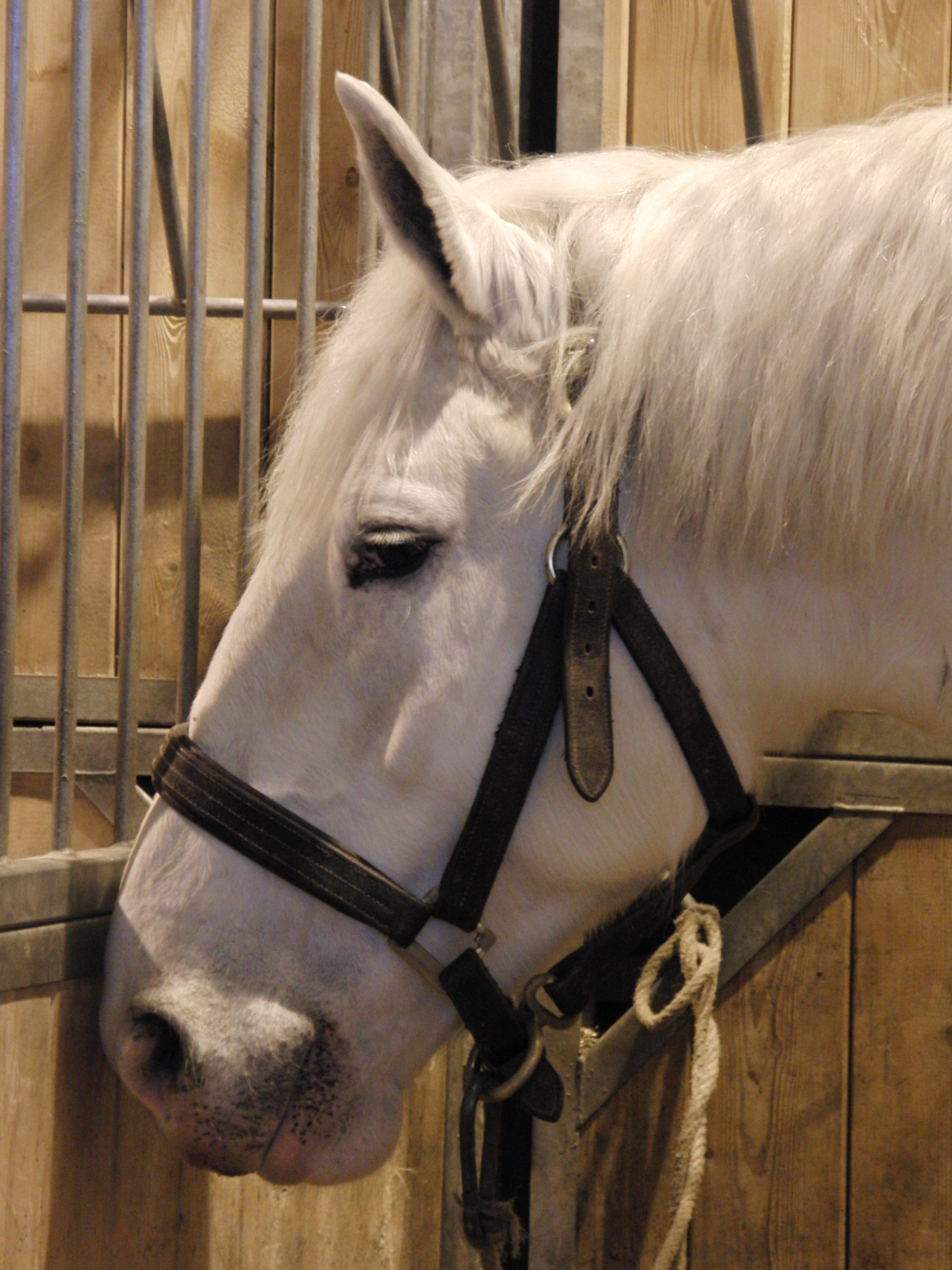
The characteristic facial profile of the breed

The Boulonnais today stands from 14.3 to 16.3 hands (59 to 67 inches, 150 to 170 cm) or more. It has a short, elegant head with a broad forehead and a short, muscular neck. Members of the breed have full chests, rounded rib cages and sloping shoulders. The legs are fairly short but robust and strong. Unlike other draft breeds such as the Shire or Clydesdale, it has no heavy feathering on its lower legs. The breed is generally branded with a small anchor mark on the left side of the neck. Due mostly to the many additions of Oriental blood, the Boulonnais has an elegant appearance that is not often seen in heavy draft breeds and it has been called "Europe's noblest draft horse". The fineness of the skin and delicate appearance of the veins has allowed the horse to be described as looking "like polished marble", leading to its "White Marble Horse" nickname.

In 1778, the French National Stud performed an initial survey of the breed and found that most were black or dark bay. During the 1800s, gray horses began to appear, and it was the predominating color by the end of the century. Gray became a popular color during this time due to the use of the horses to haul fish at night – gray horses were more visible in the dark, and therefore more valuable. In the later years of the 20th century, breeders again began to prefer darker colors such as bay and chestnut. Today, chestnut, gray and black are the only colors allowed by the French breed registry, with the vast majority of horses being gray – a popular phrase says that the horses have coats "the color of the clouds from the coast".

=== Sub-types ===
There were originally several types of Boulonnais. The Petit Boulonnais, Mareyeuse or Mareyeur was used in the rapid transport of cartloads of fresh fish (la marée) from the Pas-de-Calais to Paris; it stood 15.1 to 15.3 hands (61 to 63 inches, 155 to 160 cm) and weighed 1,210 to 1,430 pounds (550 to 650 kg). The Picard draft came from the Picardy region, and was called the "horse of the bad land", in comparison to the Cauchoix horse from the Pays de Caux area, which was called the "horse of the good land". The "grand Boulonnais", which stood 15.3 to 16.3 hands (63 to 67 inches, 160 to 170 cm) high and weighed 1,430 to 1,650 pounds (650 to 750 kg), was bred in the 19th century for farm work in the sugar beet fields. All of these types were bred together to create the modern Boulonnais horse.

== History ==
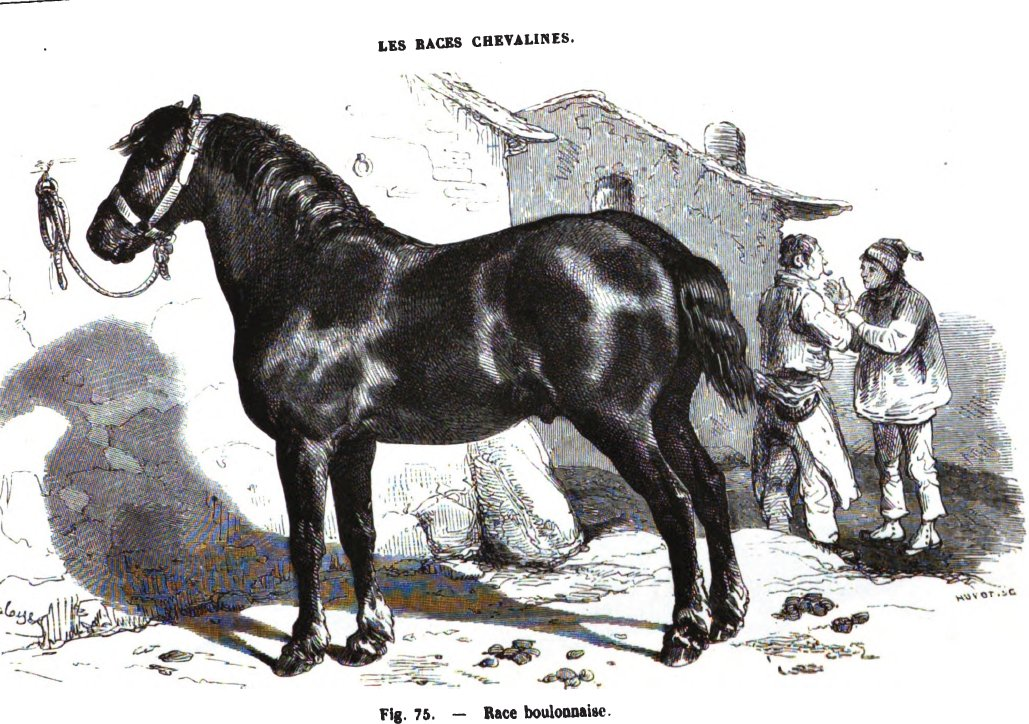
Engraving of a Boulonnais, 1861

One theory states that the origins of the Boulonnais breed emerged from the crossbreeding of native French mares and stallions brought by the Numidian army in 55–54 BC. However, many equine scholars are skeptical of this theory, and state that, whatever the early origins, the later selective breeding and local climate and soil types had a greater influence on the breed than any early Oriental blood. During the Crusades, two breeders, Eustache, Comte de Boulogne, and later Robert, Comte d'Artois, wanted to create a fast, agile, and strong warhorse for knights to ride in battle. They crossed the existing heavy French stallions with German Mecklenburg mares, similar to modern-day Hanoverians. During the 17th-century Spanish occupation of Flanders, a mixture of Spanish Barb, Arabian, and Andalusian blood was added to the breed, to create the modern Boulonnais. By the 17th century, horse dealers were coming into the Boulonnais district from Picardy and Upper Normandy to buy local horses, which enjoyed a good reputation among breeders. From the late 18th through the mid-19th century, the Boulonnais spread across France and Europe; during this time, the breed increased in size as the Industrial Revolution called for larger horses that retained the active movement of the original type. Beginning in the 1830s, it was proposed to cross the Arabian with the Boulonnais to create a new type of cavalry horse, and in the 1860s, calls were put forth to add Thoroughbred blood for the same reason. However, breeders rejected these calls, stating that using the breed to create cavalry horses would make them poorer draft horses. Breed societies also discouraged crosses between the Boulonnais and the Brabant. In June 1886, a studbook was created for the breed in France, and placed under the jurisdiction of the Syndicat Hippique Boulonnais (SHB) in 1902.

During the early 20th century, the Boulonnais was imported into the United States in large numbers, where it was registered along with other French heavy horse breeds as the "French draft horse". Breed members in the United States were registered with the Anglo-Norman Horse Association (or National Norman Horse Association) beginning in 1876, an association that was renamed the National French Draft Association in 1885. This association declared in 1876 that the Boulonnais, Norman, Percheron and Picardy breeds were all essentially the same, and should all be known as the "Norman horse". They later declared that all of the "Norman horses" were in fact "Percherons", regardless of actual breeding. This was mostly designed to sell mixed breed draft horses to American consumers at higher prices, and the Illinois Board of Agriculture soon ruled that only those Percherons who came from proven Percheron stock were to be registered as such, and all other breeds, including the Boulonnais, were to be considered separately. Boulonnais were exported from France to Austria, although they saw little success there, and breeding stallions were sent to Argentina.

=== 20th century and today ===
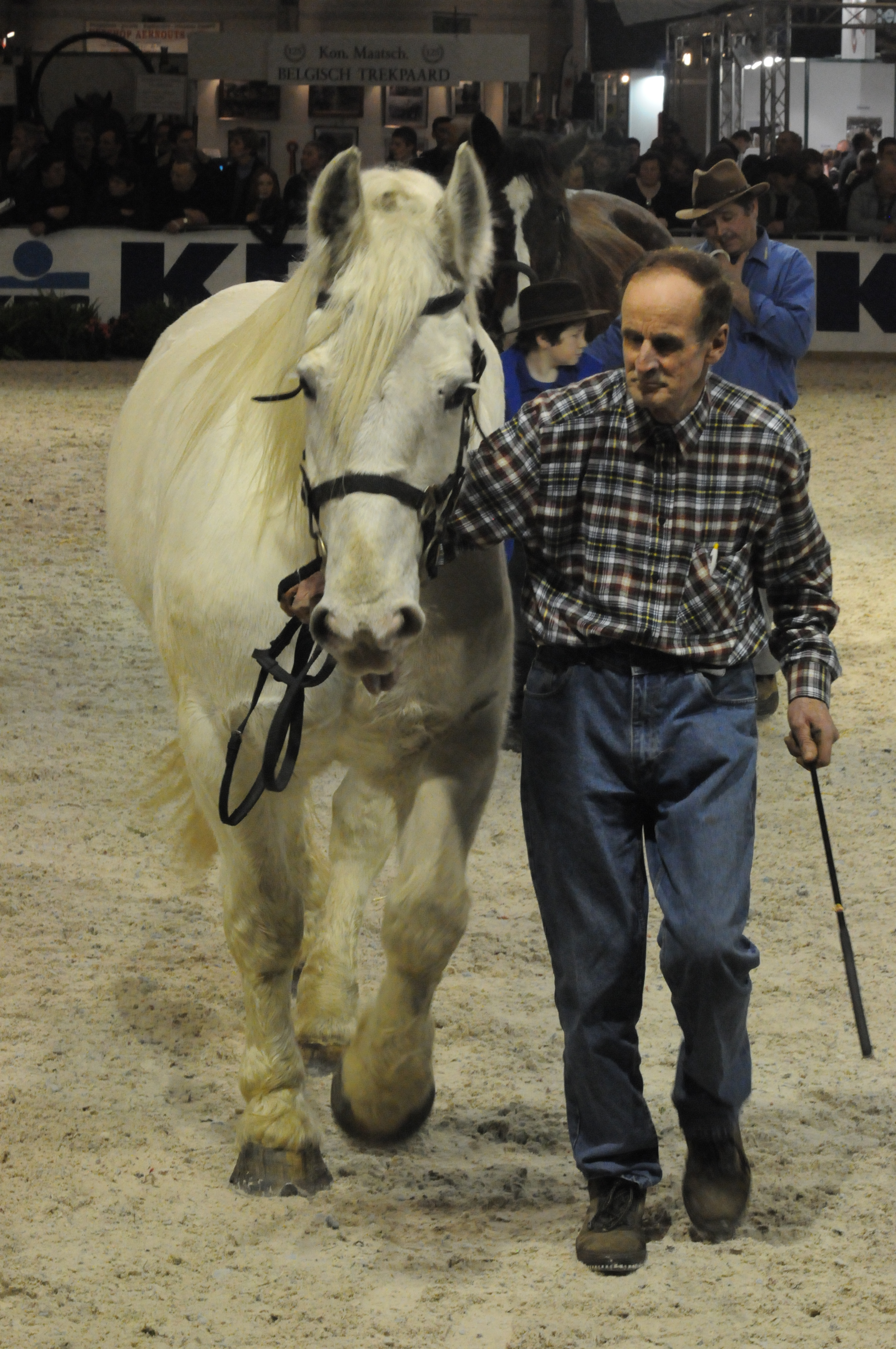
A modern Boulonnais, shown in-hand, 2011

The Boulonnais was once a popular workhorse in France, with an estimated population of over 600,000 in the early 1900s. World War I and World War II almost destroyed the breed, as its home area saw heavy combat in both wars and the bands of broodmares were scattered. Between World War II and the 1970s, the breed almost became extinct, and only a few breeders kept it alive. In the 1970s, it became popular for horse meat, and consumers considered it to be some of the best meat available. However, by this point, there were fewer than 1,000 mares remaining. During the mid-20th century, the stallions Fréthun (foaled in 1949), Select (1962), Trésor (1963), Astérix (1966) and Prince (1981) had a strong influence on the breed, although this contributed to the problem of inbreeding. Fréthun genes are found in 14 percent of the pedigrees of Boulonnais living today. In the early 1970s, Henry Blanc, the newly appointed director of the French National Stud, proposed that nine draft horse breeds, including the Boulonnais, be recategorized from pulling horses to meat horses. When enacted, this recategorization helped to preserve the gene pool of the Boulonnais by encouraging breeding, but it also changed its primary purpose, resulting in a dramatic weight increase by the 1980s.

The Boulonnais is still bred in small numbers, with the American Boulonnais Horse Association estimating a population of fewer than 1,000 animals remaining in Europe. Many studs are government-funded, to prevent the breed from dying out. The majority of the breed, 95 percent, are located in the Nord-Pas-de-Calais and Normandy regions and 75 percent in just the Pas-de-Calais department of Nord-Pas-de-Calais alone. Although most Boulonnais are in France, a few are exported. In 1999, fifteen foals were exported to Brazil and one stallion to Argentina. On average, a little over a dozen horses a year are exported, mainly to Brazil and Belgium for breeding and to Germany for forestry work. A few horses live in the Netherlands, Switzerland and Luxembourg, as well as in North America. Since 2006, twenty horses, including two registry-approved breeding stallions, have been exported from France to Denmark to create a stud farm in that country.

The French national stud, the Haras Nationaux, allows the registration of horses bred using artificial insemination and embryo transfer, but does not allow the registration of cloned horses. It considers the breed to be endangered, along with several other French draft breeds. A 2009 study of French equine genetics proposed that the Boulonnais, along with four other French breeds, should be a conservation priority, with a goal of maintaining maximum genetic variability in France's native horse population. This follows from studies done as early as 1983 that showed inbreeding and a lack of genetic diversity in the breed.

== Uses ==
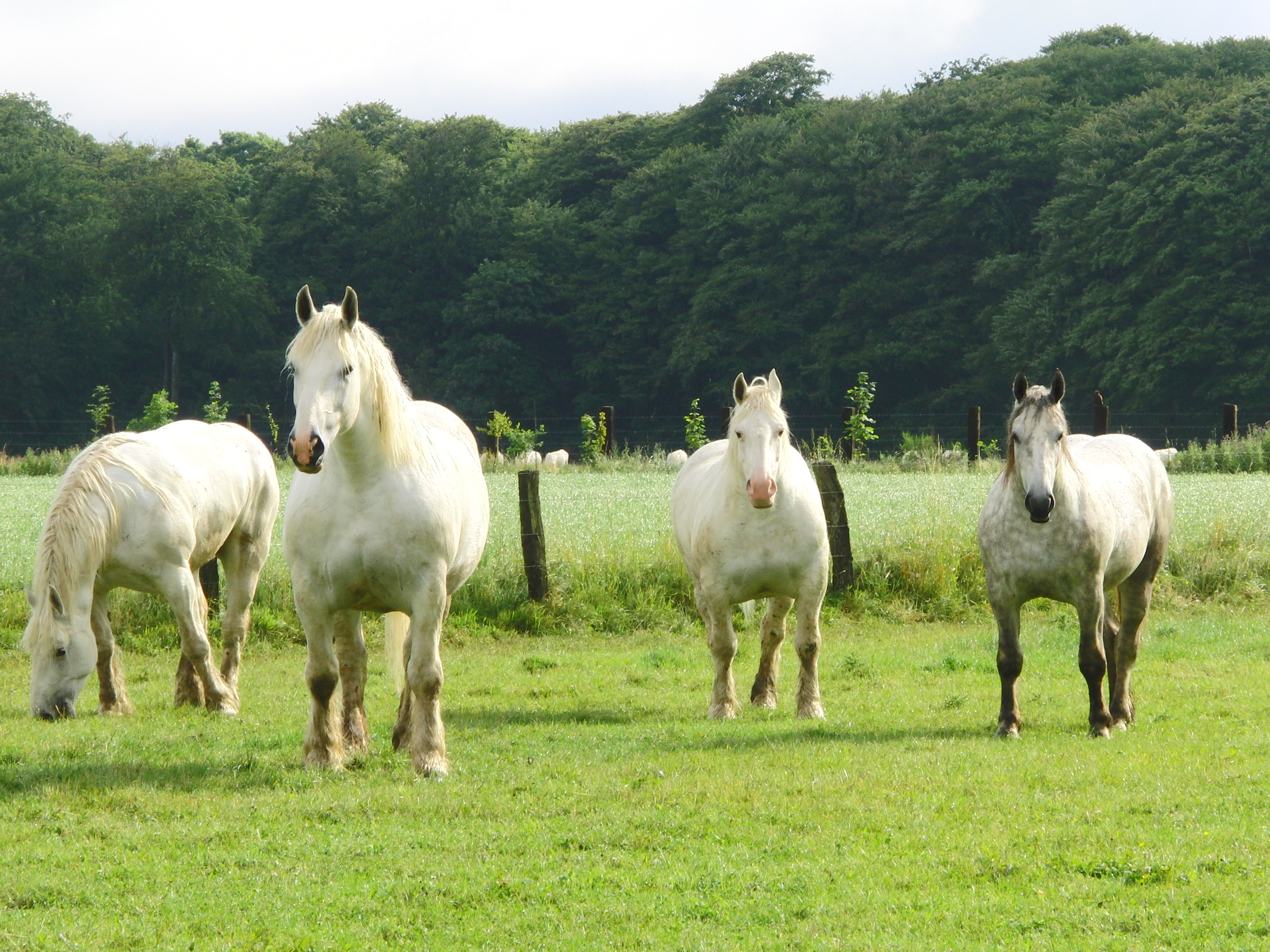
Boulonnais horses at pasture in Le Titre, Somme, France

During the 17th century, the smaller Mareyeuse type was used for transporting fresh fish from Boulogne to Paris, a distance of almost 200 miles, in under 18 hours. This journey is remembered annually in the Route du Poisson race. Only mares pulled small carts full of ice and fish on the relay-style trip. By 1884, the Boulonnais was called the "largest and most valuable of that kind of horse in France". At that time, they were used to move heavy blocks of building stone in Paris, with six to eight horses drawing blocks of several tons. During the 20th century, the larger Boulonnais type was utilized by the French army, and highly regarded for its ability to pull artillery and supply wagons. Falling demand for the breed means that today it is bred mainly for horsemeat. In 2010, 60 percent of Boulonnais horses bred in France were intended for slaughter, and 80 percent of these were exported, mainly to Italy, to be fattened before being sent to slaughterhouses. However, the sector is in crisis due to falling prices, controversy and the importation of cheap meat; despite a resurgence following the Mad Cow scares of the 1990s, the consumption of horse meat has fallen sharply, although the Nord-Pas-de-Calais region remains the largest consumer of horse meat in France.

The Boulonnais provided part of the base for the Anglo-Norman breed, which was later to play a large role in the creation of the Selle Français. It was also used in the creation and refinement of the Italian Heavy Draft, the post-World War II improvement of the Schleswig horse, and the creation of the early 19th-century Ardennes. Some equine scholars theorize that if the smaller Mareyeur had survived, it would have been an ideal horse to cross with the Thoroughbred or Anglo-Arabian to produce a warmblood for competition. In France, a breeding program has been developed by the National Stud to cross Boulonnais and Arabian horses to create a fast, alert driving horse, called the Araboulonnais. This breeding program also brings new blood into the Boulonnais line as, if an Araboulonnais mare is bred to a Boulonnais stallion, and a resulting filly is bred to another Boulonnais stallion, the third generation horse may be inducted into the purebred Boulonnais studbook if it passes an inspection.

== See also ==
- List of French horse breeds
