= List of horse breeds =

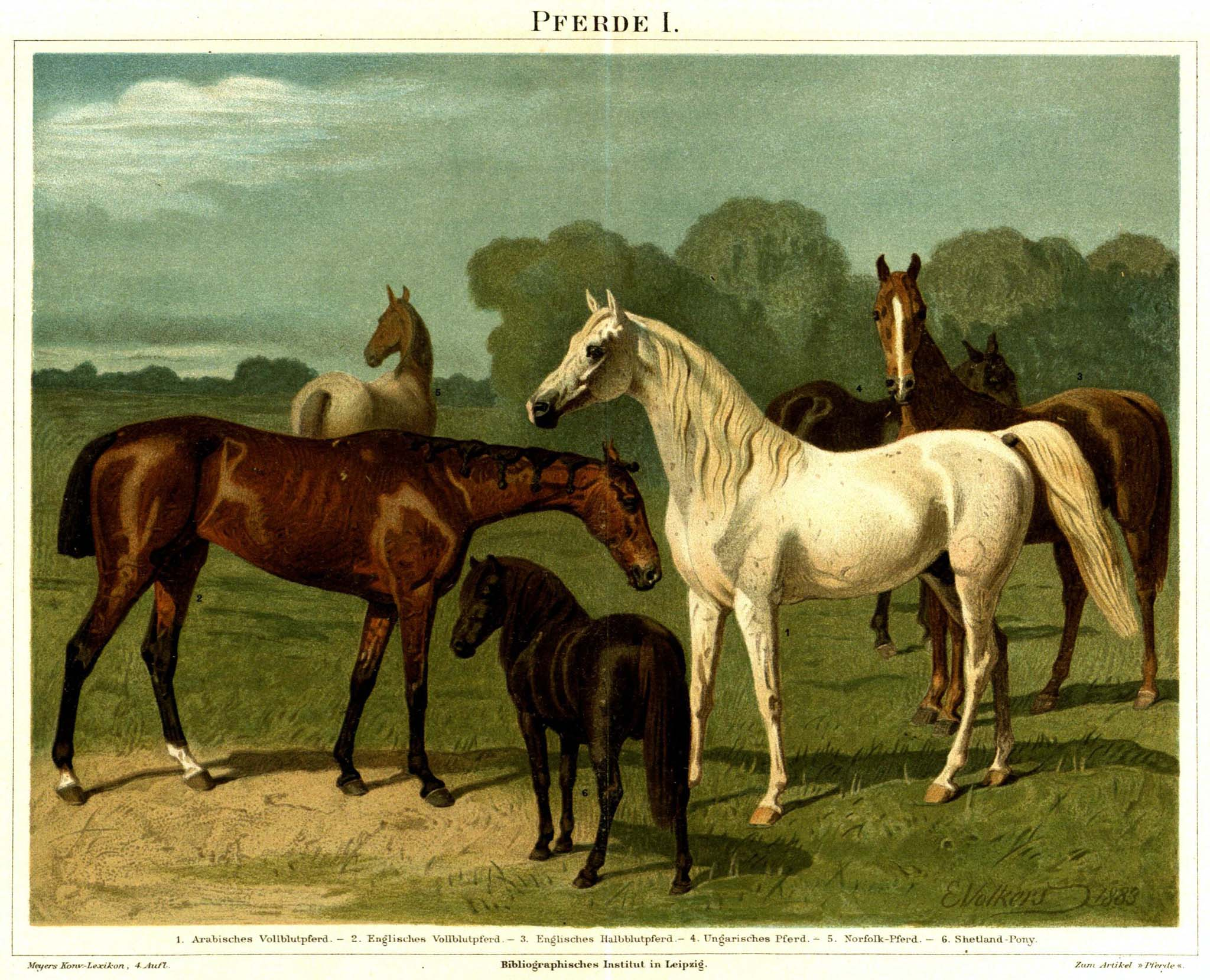
Light or saddle horse breeds

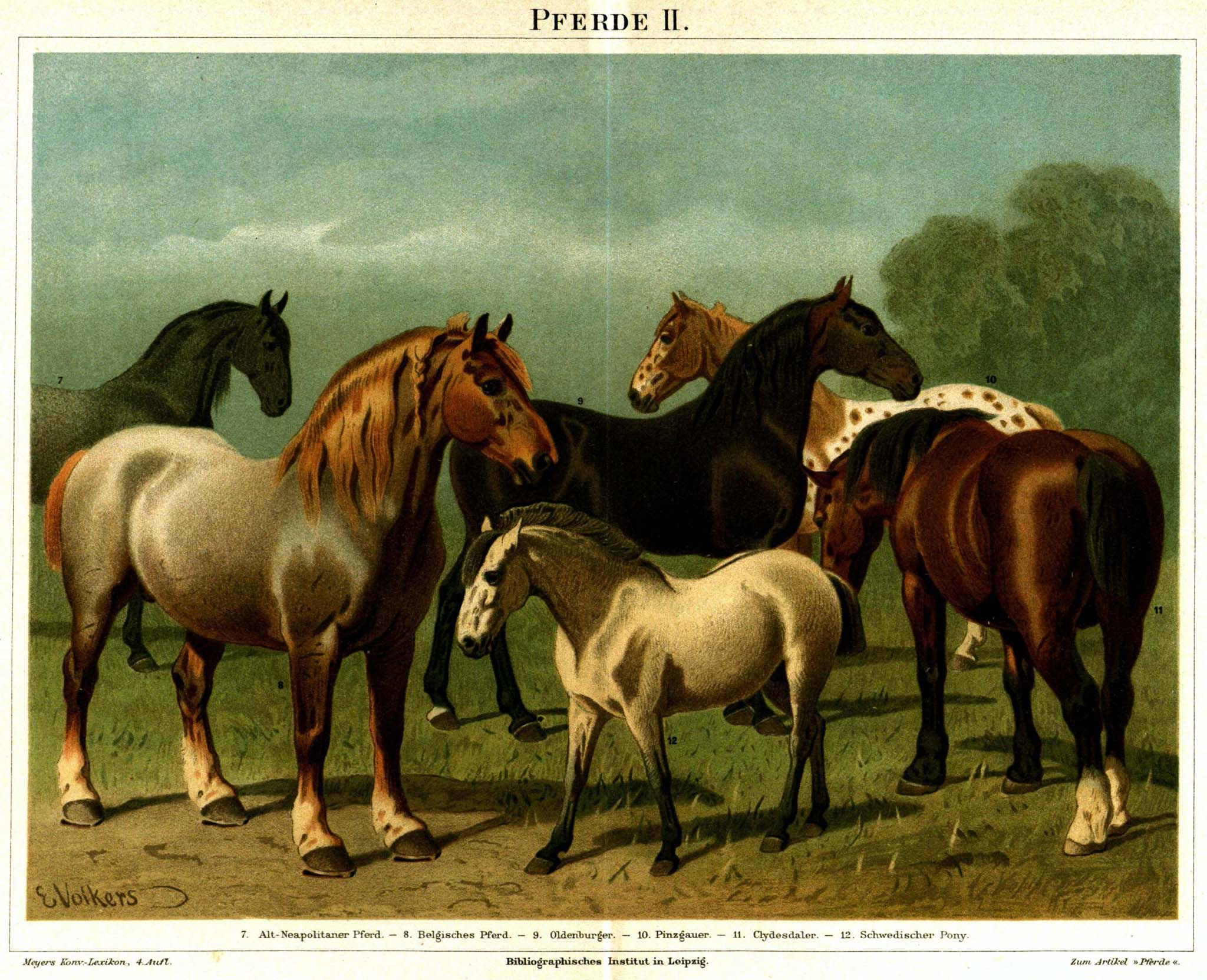
Heavy or draft horse breeds

The following list of horse and pony breeds includes standardized breeds, some strains within breeds that are considered distinct populations, types of horses with common characteristics that are not necessarily standardized breeds but are sometimes described as such, and terms that describe groupings of several breeds with similar characteristics.

While there is no single definition of the term "breed", it can be defined as a population sharing common ancestry, which has been subjected to similar selection objectives, and which conforms to certain established "breed standards". Its members may be called purebred. In most cases, bloodlines of horse breeds are recorded with a breed registry. The concept is somewhat flexible in horses, as open stud books are created for recording pedigrees of horse breeds that are not yet fully true-breeding.

Registries are considered the authority as to whether a given breed is listed as a "horse" or a "pony". There are also a number of "color breed", sport horse, and gaited horse registries for horses with various phenotypes or other traits, which admit any animal fitting a given set of physical characteristics, even if there the trait is not a true-breeding characteristic. Other recording entities or specialty organizations may recognize horses from multiple breeds, or are recording designer crossbreds. Such animals may be classified here as a breed, a crossbreed, or a "type", depending on the stage of breed recognition.

== Horse breeds ==
In some cultures and for some competition-sanctioning organizations, a horse that normally matures less than about 145 cm or 14.2 hands (58 inches, 147 cm) when fully grown may be classified as a "pony". However, unless the principal breed registry or breed standard describes the breed as a pony, it is listed in this section, even if some or all representatives are small or have some pony characteristics. Ponies are listed in the § Pony breeds section below.

=== A–C ===
- Abaga
- Abyssinian
- Adaev
- Aegidienberger
- Akhal-Teke
- Albanian
- Altai
- Alter Real
- Altwürttemberger
- American Bashkir Curly
- American Belgian Draft
- American Cream Draft
- American Indian Horse
- American Paint Horse
- American Quarter Horse
- American Saddlebred
- American Warmblood
- Andalusian
- Andravida
- Anglo-Arabian
- Anglo-Kabarda
- Appaloosa
- Arabian
- Ardennais
- Arenberg-Nordkirchen
- Asturcón
- Australian Draught
- Australian Stock Horse
- Austrian Warmblood
- Auvergne
- Auxois
- Axios
- Azerbaijan
- Azteca
- Baise horse, Guangxi
- Bale
- Balearic horse, see Mallorquín and Menorquín
- Balikun horse
- Baluchi horse
- Banker horse
- Barb horse
- Bardigiano
- Bashkir horse
- Basque Mountain Horse
- Bavarian Warmblood
- Belgian Draught, also Brabant, Belgisch Trekpaard, Trait belge
- Belgian Sport Horse
- Belgian Trotter
- Belgian Warmblood (includes Belgian Half-blood)
- Bhutia Horse, also Bhotia, Bhote ghoda, Bhutan, Bhutani, Bhutua
- Black Forest Horse or Black Forest Coldblood
- Blazer horse
- Boerperd
- Borana
- Bosnian Mountain Horse
- Boulonnais horse
- Brandenburger
- Brazilian Sport Horse (Brasileiro de Hipismo)
- Breton horse, or Trait Breton
- British Warmblood
- Brumby
- Budyonny horse or Budenny
- Burguete horse
- Burmese Horse
- Byelorussian Harness Horse
- Calabrese horse
- Camargue horse
- Camarillo White Horse
- Campeiro
- Campolina
- Canadian horse
- Canadian Pacer
- Carolina Marsh Tacky
- Carthusian Spanish horse
- Caspian horse
- Castilian, see Andalusian
- Castillonnais
- Catria horse
- Cavallo Romano della Maremma Laziale
- Cerbat Mustang
- Chickasaw Horse, see Florida Cracker Horse
- Chaidamu horse
- Chakouyi
- Chernomor horse
- Chilean horse or Chilean Corralero
- Chinese Mongolian horse
- Choctaw horse
- Cleveland Bay
- Clydesdale horse
- Colorado Ranger
- Coldblood trotter
- Comtois horse
- Corsican horse
- Costa Rican Saddle Horse
- Cretan horse, see Messara
- Criollo horse
- Croatian Coldblood
- Cuban Criollo
- Cumberland Island horse
- Czech Warmblood

=== D–K ===
- Daliboz, see Azerbaijan horse
- Danish Warmblood
- Danube Delta horse
- Dareshuri
- Datong horse
- Dølehest
- Don, see Russian Don
- Dongola horse
- Dutch Harness Horse
- Dutch Draft
- Dutch Warmblood
- Dzungarian horse, see Przewalski's horse
- East Bulgarian
- Estonian Draft
- Estonian Native
- Ethiopian horses
- Falabella
- Faroese or Faroe horse, see Faroe pony in pony section
- Finnhorse, or Finnish Horse
- Flemish Horse
- Fleuve
- Fjord horse, also Norwegian Fjord Horse
- Florida Cracker Horse
- Foutanké or Fouta
- Frederiksborger
- Freiberger
- French Trotter
- Friesian
- Furioso-North Star
- Galiceno or Galiceño
- Gelderland horse
- Giara Horse
- Gidran
- Groningen Horse
- Gypsy Vanner
- Hackney horse
- Haflinger
- Hanoverian horse
- Heck horse
- Heihe horse
- Henson horse
- Hequ horse
- Hirzai
- Hispano-Bretón
- Hispano-Árabe also known as Hispano or Spanish Anglo-Arab
- Holsteiner
- Horro
- Hungarian Warmblood
- Icelandic horse
- Indian Country-bred
- Iomud
- Irish Draught
- Irish Sport Horse or Irish Hunter
- Italian Heavy Draft
- Italian Trotter
- Jaca Navarra
- Jeju horse
- Jutland horse
- Kabarda horse, also known as Kabardian or Kabardin
- Kafa
- Kaimanawa horses
- Kalmyk horse
- Karabair
- Karabakh horse also known as Azer At
- Karossier see Ostfriesen and Alt-Oldenburger
- Karachai horse
- Kathiawari horse
- Kazakh Horse
- Kentucky Mountain Saddle Horse
- Kiger Mustang
- Kinsky horse
- Konik
- Kyrgyz Horse
- Kisber Felver
- Kiso Horse
- Kladruber
- Knabstrupper
- Kundudo horse
- Kurdish horse
- Kustanair

=== L–R ===
- Latvian horse
- Lipizzan or Lipizzaner
- Lithuanian Heavy Draught
- Ljutomer Trotter
- Lokai
- Losino horse
- Lusitano
- Luxembourg Warmblood
- Lyngshest, see Nordlandshest/ Lyngshest
- M'Bayar
- M'Par
- Malopolski
- Mallorquín
- Mangalarga
- Mangalarga Marchador
- Maremmano
- Marismeño
- Marsh Tacky, see Carolina Marsh Tacky
- Marwari horse
- Mecklenburger
- Međimurje horse
- Menorquín horse
- Mérens horse
- Messara horse
- Mezőhegyesi sport-horse (sportló), or
  Mezőhegyes felver, see Hungarian Warmblood
- Metis Trotter, see Russian Trotter
- Miquelon horse
- Miniature horse
- Misaki horse
- Missouri Fox Trotter
- Monchino
- Mongolian Horse
- Mongolian Wild Horse, see Przewalski's horse
- Monterufolino
- Morab
- Morgan horse
- Mountain Pleasure Horse
- Moyle horse
- Muraközi, Murakoz, or Muraközi ló, see Međimurje horse
- Murgese
- Mustang
- Namib Desert Horse
- Nangchen horse
- National Show Horse
- New Altai
- Nez Perce Horse
- Nivernais horse
- Nokota horse
- Noma horse
- Nonius horse
- Nooitgedachter
- Nordlandshest/ Lyngshest
- Noriker horse or Pinzgauer
- Norman Cob
- Norsk Kaldblodstraver (Norwegian Coldblood Trotter), see Coldblood Trotter
- North American Single-footing Horse
- North Swedish horse
- Novoolexandrian Draught
- Novokirghiz
- Oberlander Horse
- Ogaden
- Oldenburger
- Orlov Trotter
- Ostfriesen and Alt-Oldenburger
- Paint, see American Paint Horse
- Pampa horse
- Paso Fino
- Pentro horse
- Percheron
- Persano horse
- Peruvian Paso, sometimes called Peruvian Stepping Horse
- Pfalz-ardenner
- Pintabian
- Pleven horse
- Poitevin horse also called Mulassier
- Posavac
- Pottok
- Priob
- Pryor Mountain Mustang
- Przewalski's horse, a subspecies, not a "breed"
- Pura Raza Española or PRE, see Andalusian
- Purosangue Orientale
- Qatgani
- Quarab
- Quarter Horse, see American Quarter Horse
- Racking horse
- Retuerta horse
- Rhenish German Coldblood also known as Rhineland Heavy Draft
- Rhinelander horse
- Riwoche horse
- Rocky Mountain Horse
- Romanian Sporthorse
- Rottaler, see Heavy warmblood
- Russian Don
- Russian Heavy Draft
- Russian Trotter

=== S–Z ===
- Saddlebred, see American Saddlebred
- Salernitano
- Samolaco horse
- Sanfratellano
- Santa Cruz Island horse
- Sarcidano horse
- Sardinian Anglo-Arab
- Schleswig Coldblood
- Schwarzwälder Kaltblut, see Black Forest Horse
- Selale
- Sella Italiano
- Selle Français
- Senner
- Shagya Arabian
- Shan Horse or Shan Myinn
- Shire horse
- Siciliano indigeno
- Silesian horse
- Sindhi horse
- Slovenian Cold-blood
- Sorraia
- Sokolski horse
- South German Coldblood or Süddeutsches Kaltblut
- Soviet Heavy Draft
- Spanish Barb
- Spanish Jennet Horse, modern, not to be confused with the historic Jennet or Spanish Jennet (see Archaic types, below)
- Spanish Mustang
- Spanish Tarpan, see Sorraia
- Spanish Trotter (Trotador Español)
- Spiti Horse
- Spotted Saddle Horse
- Standardbred
- Sudanese Country-Bred
- Suffolk Punch
- Svensk Kallblodstravare (Swedish Coldblood Trotter), see Coldblood Trotter
- Swedish Ardennes
- Swedish Warmblood
- Swiss Warmblood
- Taishū horse
- Takhi, see Przewalski's horse
- Tawleed
- Tchernomor, see Budyonny
- Tennessee Walking Horse
- Tersk horse
- Thoroughbred
- Tiger Horse
- Tokara horse
- Tolfetano
- Tori horse
- Trait Du Nord
- Trakehner
- Tsushima, see Taishū
- Tuigpaard, see Dutch Harness Horse
- Tushetian horse
- Tuva horse
- Ukrainian Riding Horse
- Unmol Horse
- Uzunyayla
- Ventasso horse (Cavallo del Ventasso)
- Virginia highlander
- Vlaamperd
- Vladimir Heavy Draft
- Vyatka horse
- Waler or Australian Waler
- Walkaloosa
- Warlander
- Welsh Cob (Section D)
- Westphalian horse
- Wielkopolski
- Croatian Warmblood
- Württemberger
- Xilingol horse
- Yakutian horse
- Yili horse
- Yonaguni horse
- Zangersheide
- Zaniskari
- Zakynthos horse
- Zweibrücker
- Žemaitukas, also known as Zemaituka,
  Zhumd, Zhemaichu, or Zhmudka

== Pony breeds ==
If a breed is described as a "pony" by the breed standard or principal breed registry, it is listed in this section, even if some individuals have horse characteristics. All other breeds are listed in the § Horse breeds section above.

(Because of this designation by the preference of a given breed registry, most miniature horse breeds are listed as "horses", not ponies.)

=== A–K ===
- American Shetland Pony
- American Walking Pony
- Anadolu Pony
- Assateague
- Australian Pony
- Australian Riding Pony
- Bali Pony
- Basuto pony, also spelled Basotho pony
- Batak Pony
- Bhirum pony
- Bosnian Mountain Horse
- British Spotted Pony
- Burmese pony
- Camargue horse see horse section
- Canadian rustic pony
- Carpathian Pony, see Hucul Pony
- Caspian horse see horse section
- Chincoteague Pony
- Chinese Guoxia
- Coffin Bay Pony
- Connemara pony
- Czechoslovakian Small Riding Pony
- Dales Pony
- Danish Sport Pony
- Dartmoor pony
- Deli pony
- Dülmen Pony
- Eriskay pony
- Esperia Pony
- Exmoor pony
- Falabella see horse section
- Faroe pony
- Fell Pony
- Flores pony, see Timor Pony
- French Saddle Pony
- Galician Pony
- Garrano
- Gayoe
- German Riding Pony, Deutsches Reitpony
- German Classic Pony
- Gotland Pony, Skogsruss
- Guizhou pony
- Gǔo-xìa pony, see Chinese Guoxia
- Hackney pony
- Haflinger see horse section
- Highland pony
- Hokkaido Pony
- Hucul Pony, also called Huțul Pony
- Java Pony
- Karelian pony
- Kerry bog pony

=== L–Z ===
- Lac La Croix Indian Pony
- Landais Pony
- Lewitzer Pony
- Lijiang pony
- Lundy Pony
- Manipuri Pony
- Merens Pony, also called Ariegeois pony, see Merens horse
- Miniature horse, see horse section
- Miyako Pony
- Narym Pony
- New Forest pony
- Newfoundland pony
- Peneia Pony
- Petiso Argentino
- Pindos Pony
- Poney du Logone, also called Poney Mousseye
- Pony of the Americas
- Quarter pony
- Sable Island Pony
- Sandalwood Pony
- Shetland pony
- Skyros Pony
- Sumba and Sumbawa Pony
- Tibetan Pony
- Timor Pony
- Welara
- Welsh Pony (sections A, B and C)
- Western Sudan pony

== Color "breeds" ==
There are some registries that accept horses (and sometimes ponies and mules) of almost any breed or type for registration. Color is either the only criterion for registration or the primary criterion. These are called "color breeds", because unlike "true" horse breeds, there are few other physical requirements, nor is the stud book limited in any fashion. As a general rule, the color also does not always breed on (in some cases due to genetic impossibility), and offspring without the stated color are usually not eligible for recording with the color breed registry. There are breeds that have color that usually breeds "true" as well as distinctive physical characteristics and a limited stud book. These horses are true breeds that have a preferred color, not color breeds, and include the Friesian horse, the Cleveland Bay, the Appaloosa, and the American Paint Horse.

The best-known "color breed" registries that accept horses from many different breeds are for the following colors:

- Buckskin: a color which cannot breed "true" due to the cream gene which creates it being an incomplete dominant
- Palomino: a color which cannot breed "true" due to the cream gene which creates it being an incomplete dominant
- Pinto: there exists a registry for Pinto-colored horses of varying breeds, distinct from the American Paint Horse registry, though some qualifying horses may be registered in both.
- White: some of these animals are registered in the United States with the American creme and white horse registry, which was once called an "Albino" registry until it was understood that true albino does not exist in horses. (see White (horse) and Dominant white for details)

== Crossbred registration ==
The distinction is hotly debated between a standardized breed, a developing breed with an open studbook, a registry of recognized crossbred horses, and a designer crossbred. For the purposes of this list, certain groups of horses that have an organization or registry that records individual animals for breeding purposes, at least in some nations, but does not clearly fall to either the breed or type categories are listed here. This list does not include organizations that record horses strictly for competition purposes.

- AQPS ("Autre Que Pur-Sang"), French designation for riding horses "other than Thoroughbred", usually referring to the Anglo-Arabian, Selle Français and other Thoroughbred crosses. There is a registry for AQPS horses in France.
- Arabo-friesian
- Friesian Sporthorse (a type of Friesian cross)
- German Warmblood or ZfDP, collective term for any of the various warmblood horses of Germany, of which some may be registered with the nationwide German Horse Breeding Society (ZfDP).
- Gypsy horse, also called "Gypsy Vanner", "Vanner Horse", "Gypsy Cob", "Irish Cob", "Coloured Cob", and Tinker horse.
- Indian Half-bred, a half-blood type from India
- Part-Arabian, a variety of breeds and crossbreeds with a significant amount of documentable Arabian blood, but not pure Arab.
- Spanish Norman
- ZfDP, see German Warmblood, above.

== Types of horse ==
A "type" of horse is not a breed but is used here to categorize groups of horses or horse breeds that are similar in appearance (phenotype) or use. A type usually has no breed registry, and often encompasses several breeds. However, in some nations, particularly in Europe, there is a recording method or means of studbook selection for certain types to allow them to be licensed for breeding. Horses of a given type may be registered as one of several different recognized breeds, or a grouping may include horses that are of no particular pedigree but meet a certain standard of appearance or use.

=== Modern types ===
- Cob (horse), a body type of small, sturdy, compact and powerful riding horse with a number of breeds and partbreds falling onto the classification
- Colonial Spanish horse, descendants of the original Jennet-type horse brought to North America, now with a number of modern breed names.
- Draft horse or draught horse, heavy muscular horse for pulling agricultural or commercial equipment and vehicles
- Feral horse, a horse living in the wild, but descended from once-domesticated ancestors. Most "wild" horses today are actually feral. The only true wild (never domesticated) horse in the world today is the Przewalski's horse.
- Gaited horse, includes a number of breeds with a hereditary ambling gaits, including the Tennessee Walker, Paso Fino, and others.
- Garron, term in Scotland and Ireland for a small sturdy horse or pony.
- Grade horse, a horse of unknown or mixed breed parentage.
- Hack, a basic riding horse, particularly in the UK, also includes show hack horses used in competition.
- Heavy warmblood, heavy carriage and riding horses, predecessors to the modern warmbloods, several old-style breeds still in existence today.
- Hunter, a type of jumping horse, either a show hunter or a field hunter; a hunter pony is under 14.2 hands.
- Iberian horse, encompassing horse and pony breeds developed in the Iberian Peninsula, including the Andalusian, Lusitano and others.
- Meat horse, originally working draft breeds bred larger, meatier and fatter for horse meat markets.
- Mountain and moorland pony breeds, abbreviated "M&M," a specific group of pony breeds native to the British Isles.
- New Zealand Warmblood, a developing warmblood type based on Hanoverian and KWPF breeding.
- Oriental horse, the "hot-blooded" breeds originating in the Middle East, such as the Arabian, Akhal-Teke, Barb, and Turkoman horse
- Polo pony, a horse used in the sport of polo, not actually a pony, usually a full-sized horse, often a Thoroughbred.
- Riding horse or saddle horse; interchangeable terms for a wide variety of horses bred primarily for suitability as riding animals as opposed to draft or harness work.
- Riding Pony, a term of art used in the United Kingdom for specific types of show ponies.
- Sport horse or sporthorse, includes any breeds suitable for use in assorted international competitive disciplines governed by the FEI.
- Stock horse, agile, heavily muscled riding horses of several different breeds, suitable for working cattle, sometimes called "cow horse" or "cow pony" in the western United States.
- Vanner, a powerfully built type of horse used for light draught work, such as pulling a commercial van. May be applied to particular breeds, such as the Gypsy Vanner horse (US)/Coloured Cob (UK).
- Warmblood, a group of sport horse breeds developed for modern dressage and other Olympic disciplines, including the Dutch Warmblood, Hanoverian, Swedish Warmblood, Westphalian, etc.
- Windsor Grey, the gray ceremonial carriage horses of British Royalty.

=== Archaic types ===
Prior to approximately the 13th century, few pedigrees were written down, and horses were classified by physical type or use. Thus, many terms for Horses in the Middle Ages did not refer to breeds as we know them today, but rather described appearance or purpose. These terms included:

- Charger, see Courser (horse)
- Courser (horse)
- Destrier or "Great Horse"
- Hobby, see Irish Hobby
- Jennet, sometimes called Spanish Jennet
- Palfrey
- Rouncey
- Steppe horse, refers to various domesticated horse and wild horse species, particularly those from Siberia and other parts of western Asia

== Extinct breeds ==
Many breeds of horse have become extinct, either because they have died out, or because they have been absorbed into another breed:

- Abaco Barb
- Abtenauer
- Angevin
- Anglo-Norman
- Augeron
- Berrichon
- Bidet
- Cape Horse, see Boerperd
- Chapman horse, see Cleveland Bay, into which it developed
- Charentais, or Vendéen
- Charolais
- Ferghana
- Galloway
- Haguard
- Irish Hobby
- Jennet, or Spanish Jennet
- Karacabey
- Lorrain
- Mazury
- Morvan
- Namaqua
- Narragansett Pacer
- Navarrin
- Neapolitan
- Nisean
- Norfolk Trotter, also called the Norfolk Roadster, Yorkshire Trotter or Yorkshire Roadster
- Öland
- Old English Black
- Pozan
- Strelets Arab
- Trait du Maine
- Turkoman Horse also known as Turkemene; the Akhal-Teke may be a direct descendant
- Yorkshire Coach Horse

== See also ==
- Lists of breeds
- Lists of horse-related topics
- Horse breeding
