= Karachay horse =

Breed of horse

Karachay
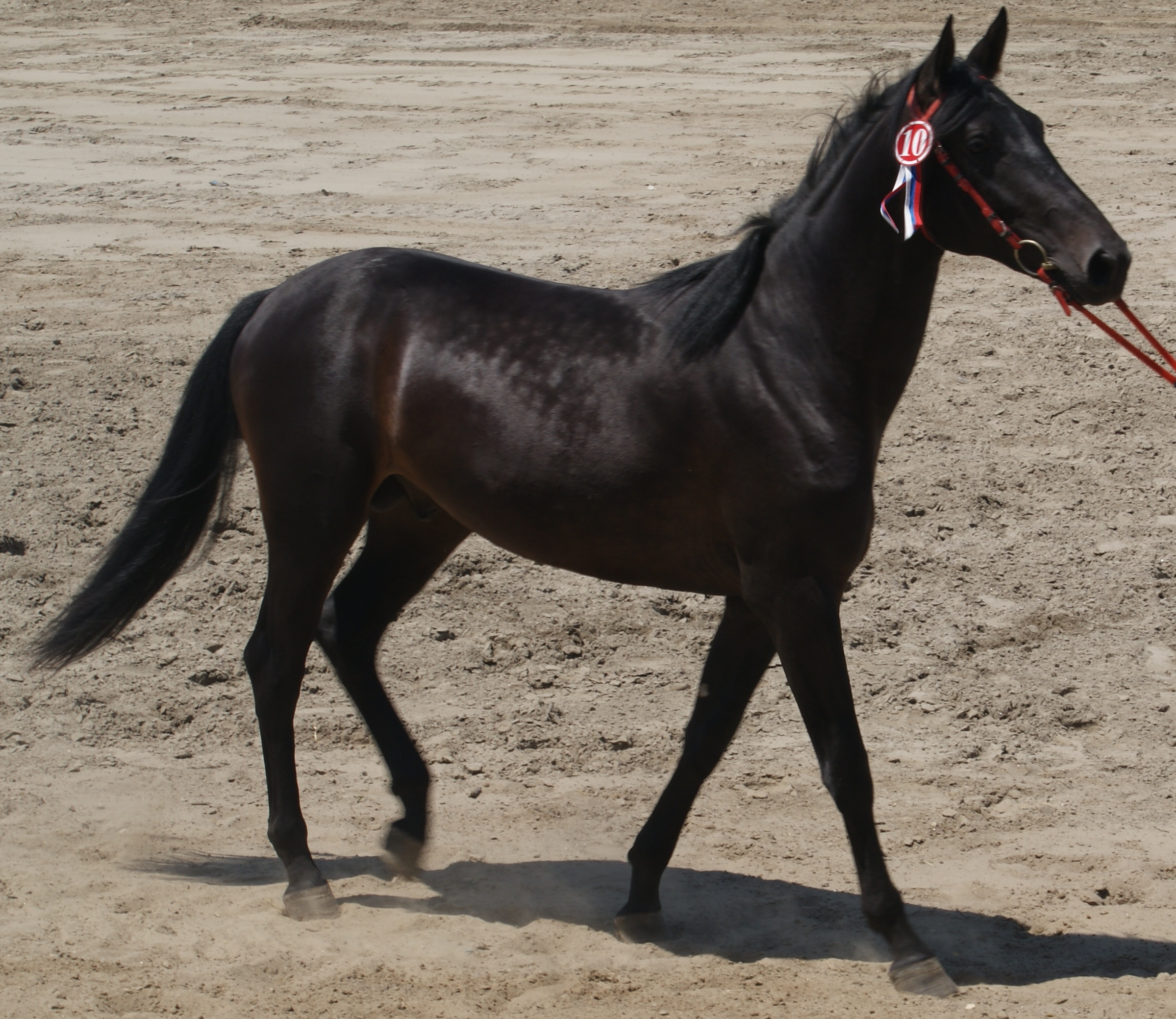
- Karachay stallion
- Other names: Karachay
- Country of origin: Karachay (modern region of Russia)

The Karachay (Karach.-Balk. Къарачай ат) is developed in the Northern Caucasus. It comes from highland Karachay at the rise of the River Kuban. They were developed by crossing regional horses with eastern stallions. Karachay horses are summered in rugged mountain country where there are wide changes in temperature and humidity, and wintered in the foothill and plains with some hay feeding. These conditions make the Karachay horse strong-limbed and sturdy.

== Horse сharacteristics ==
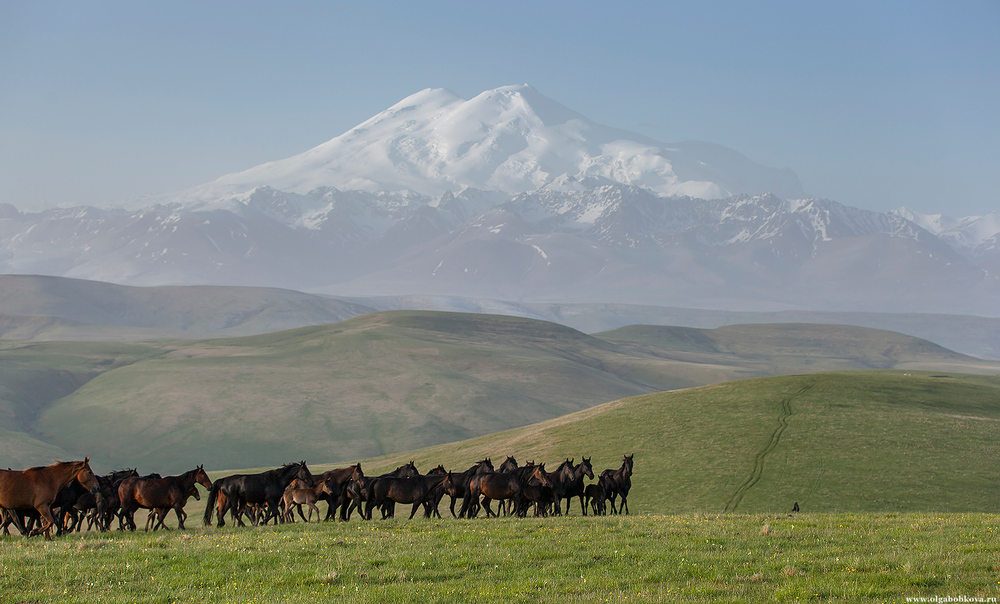

The Karachay horse stands 14.3 to 15 hands high. Karachay breeding has focused on creating a breed that is not only fast, but also hardy, obedient, low-maintenance, and able to withstand varied, even mountainous terrain all the year round. Their hooves are strong and hard and do not need shoeing if bred and worked properly. They have a long head, often with a Roman nose, as well as agile, alert ears and well-developed whiskers. Karachay horses have a medium length, well-muscled neck, relatively straight shoulders and low withers. The mane and tail are long and thick. The body is strong and straight-backed. The limbs are also strong with generally good joints and bones, and short, strong hocks; they occasionally have a tendency to be sickle-hocked, which is typical for mountain breeds. Karachay horses are black or black-brown and do not usually have any white marks. They grow to a withers height of about 160 cm.

The Karachay horse is inherently good-natured. It is very responsive to the rein and is not prone to over-excitement. This makes it indispensable to the mountain tourism industry. The Karachay horse has been able to survive extinction mainly because of two things: its high fertility rate and its strong resistance to common horse illnesses. It is a hardy breed that requires minimal supervision.

Average measurements of Karachay horses (Stud farm № 168, 2001/2002).

Karachay horse	Height	Chest girth	Bone below the knee
Stallions	157,8	189,8	20,3
Mares	152,5	187,8	19,1

== History of the horse ==
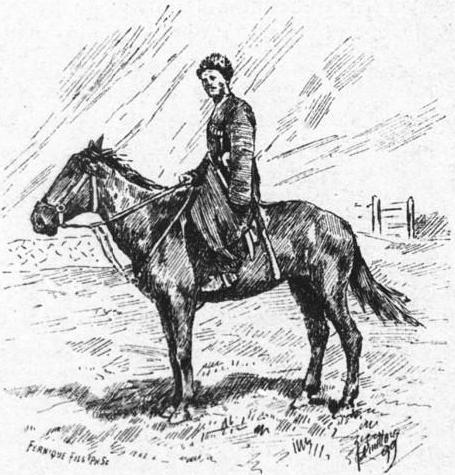
Cavalier Koratchai. Grove, Florence Craufurd. Le Caucase. 1899. P. 32.

The Karachay is a riding horse that originated from the north-western regions of the Caucasus Mountains. It was first bred for military and agricultural use, by Karachays around the 14th-15th centuries in the climatic and geographical conditions of the North Caucasus.

The Karachay horse was known to Europeans since at least the 18th century. The German researcher Peter Simon Pallas (1793) wrote: "They grow a small but hardy and hot breed of horses, known for their outstanding qualities". Another researcher, S. Bronevsky (1823), wrote: "They have a small, but sturdy breed of mountain horses, known under the name of Karachay horses". The Hungarian ethnographer, a member of the Georgi Emmanuel expedition to Mount Elbrus, Jean-Charles de Besse, also gave a high evaluation of the breed in 1829: "Karachays ranch fine breed of horses... They are easy on the go and I don't know any other horse breed that is better for riding on steep slopes and which is so inexhaustible".

At the end of the 19th century there were local stud farms in Karachay where some herds included 500-1000 horses. At the beginning of the 20th century, Karachay played a significant role, supplying most of the Kuban Cossack army`s regiments with chargers. Every year Karachay sold about ten thousand horses.

In the 1920s, during the period of re-establishment of horse breeding in the North Caucasus which took place after the destructive civil war, people worked with the Karachay horse according to plan. In line with this, the selective breeding of Karachay horses ensued. The Riding State Stud farm was created in 1927, and the State stud farm (Gosplemhoz) of Karachay horses was organised in 1929 and then reorganised in 1930 into Karachaevsky stud farm 168, which for some time bore Joseph Stalin`s name.

In 1935 the first volume of the studbook was established for mountain breeds, registering 204 Karachay mares. The Karachay horse is especially good in the mountains. In the winter of 1935-1936 a 3,000-kilometer ride was held in the Caucasus. The duration and route of the ride were extremely difficult. Among the participants were 10 Karachay horses and horses of other breeds. The ride lasted 47 days, travelling on average 64 km per day. In one month the same horses finished a race from Piatigorsk to Rostov, a distance of 600 km in five days over very muddy roads and trails.

In 1937 a State breeding centre was created in the Karachay Autonomous Oblast.

In 1998 a group of Karachay-Cherkessia horsemen with three Karachay horses ascended the eastern summit of Mount Elbrus, the highest mountain in Europe - an unprecedented act. In 1999 horsemen with Karachay horses ascended the western summit of the same mountain. This shows how strong and well adapted the Karachay horse is for climbing mountains. Special credit goes to an expert on horse breeding, Klych Geriy Urusov, who was the mastermind behind this equestrian conquest of Elbrus. At the present time the Karachay horse is bred at Karachaevsky (Malokarachaevski) stud farm 168 and other stud farms. In 2008, there were about 20,000 Karachay horses in Karachay-Cherkessia.

== Uses ==
The Karachay horse was a charger and a draft horse, first for the Karachays, and then for the Cossack military forces of The Russian Empire; the cavalry of the USSR were also supplied with Karachay horses. Modern Karachay horses and Anglo-Karachay horses can be found in different areas, that is, horse shows, competitions, mountain races, showjumping, tourism and agriculture. Many horses were exported outside Karachay. The Karachay breed was also used for developing the Tersk horse.

== See also ==
- Kabarda horse
- Karabakh horse
- Karabair
- Karacabey horse

== Studbooks ==
- В. Х. Хотов, В. А. Парфенов. Государственная племенная книга лошадей кабардинской и карачаевской породы. Т. V. — Москва: Изд. МСХА, 1993. — 432 с. — ISBN 5-7230-0215-5.
- В. А. Парфенов, В. Х. Хотов. Государственная племенная книга лошадей карачаевской породы. Т. VI. — Москва: Изд. РГАУ-МСХА, 2010. — 287 с. — ISBN 978-5-9675-0435-8.

== Sources ==
- Dent, Bonnie L. Hendricks; foreword by Anthony A. (2007). International encyclopedia of horse breeds (Pbk. ed.). Norman: University of Oklahoma Press. ISBN 9780806138848.
