= Lijiang (disambiguation) =

Lijiang is a city in China's Yunnan province.

Lijiang may also refer to:

- Old Town of Lijiang, World Heritage Site, in downtown Lijiang
- Li River or Lijiang (漓江), river in Guangxi
- Lijiang, Hengnan County (栗江镇), town in Hunan
- Lijiang, Yuanjiang County (澧江镇), town in and seat of Yuanjiang Hani, Yi and Dai Autonomous County, Yunnan
- Lijiang pony, a pony from Lijiang, Yunnan
- 14656 Lijiang, Main-belt asteroid

== See also ==
- Li Jiang (disambiguation), several people
