= Priob =

Russian breed of horse

- Conservation status: FAO (2007): endangered
- Other names: Russian: Приобская; Priobskaya; Ob; Ostyak-Vogul; Russian: Вогулка; Vogulka
- Country of origin: Russian Federation
- Distribution: Khanty-Mansi Autonomous Okrug
- Use: agriculture; draft work; forestry; pack-horse

Traits
- Height: 132–142 cm; Male: average 136 cm; Female: average 132 cm
- Colour: bay; dun with primitive markings

The Priob or Ob, Russian: Приобская, Priobskaya, is an endangered Russian breed of small horse from the Khanty-Mansi Autonomous Okrug, in Tyumen Oblast in the Russian Federation.

It is distributed in the area of the Irtysh and lower Ob Rivers in western Siberia, and is a traditional breed of the indigenous people of that area, who used it for agriculture, for draft work, for forestry, and as a pack-horse.

== History ==
The Priob is a traditional breed of the indigenous peoples of Khanty-Mansi Autonomous Okrug. It was formerly known as the Ostyak-Vogul or Vogulka from an older name for the okrug, Ostyak-Vogul National Okrug.

In 2007 the Food and Agriculture Organization of the United Nations listed the conservation status of the breed, based on data reported to the DAD-IS database, as "endangered".

== Characteristics ==
The conformation of the Priob is similar to that of the Narym and Yakut breeds of Siberia, but it is slightly larger. It may be either bay, or dun with primitive markings – a dorsal stripe, and zebra bars on the legs. It is hardy, fertile and long-lived, and is well adapted to the climatic conditions of the western Siberian plain, where the winters may be very harsh.

== Use ==
The traditional uses of the Priob were in agriculture, for draft work, in forestry, and as a pack-horse.

In the twentieth century, under the Soviet régime, some use was made of it for cross-breeding with the Estonian Native.
