= Hirzai =

Pakistani breed of horse

Hirzai; حرزایی
- Conservation status: FAO (2007): endangered; DAD-IS (2024):unknown
- Other names: Pahari; Heerzai
- Country of origin: Pakistan

Traits
- Height: 152 cm
- Colour: usually grey

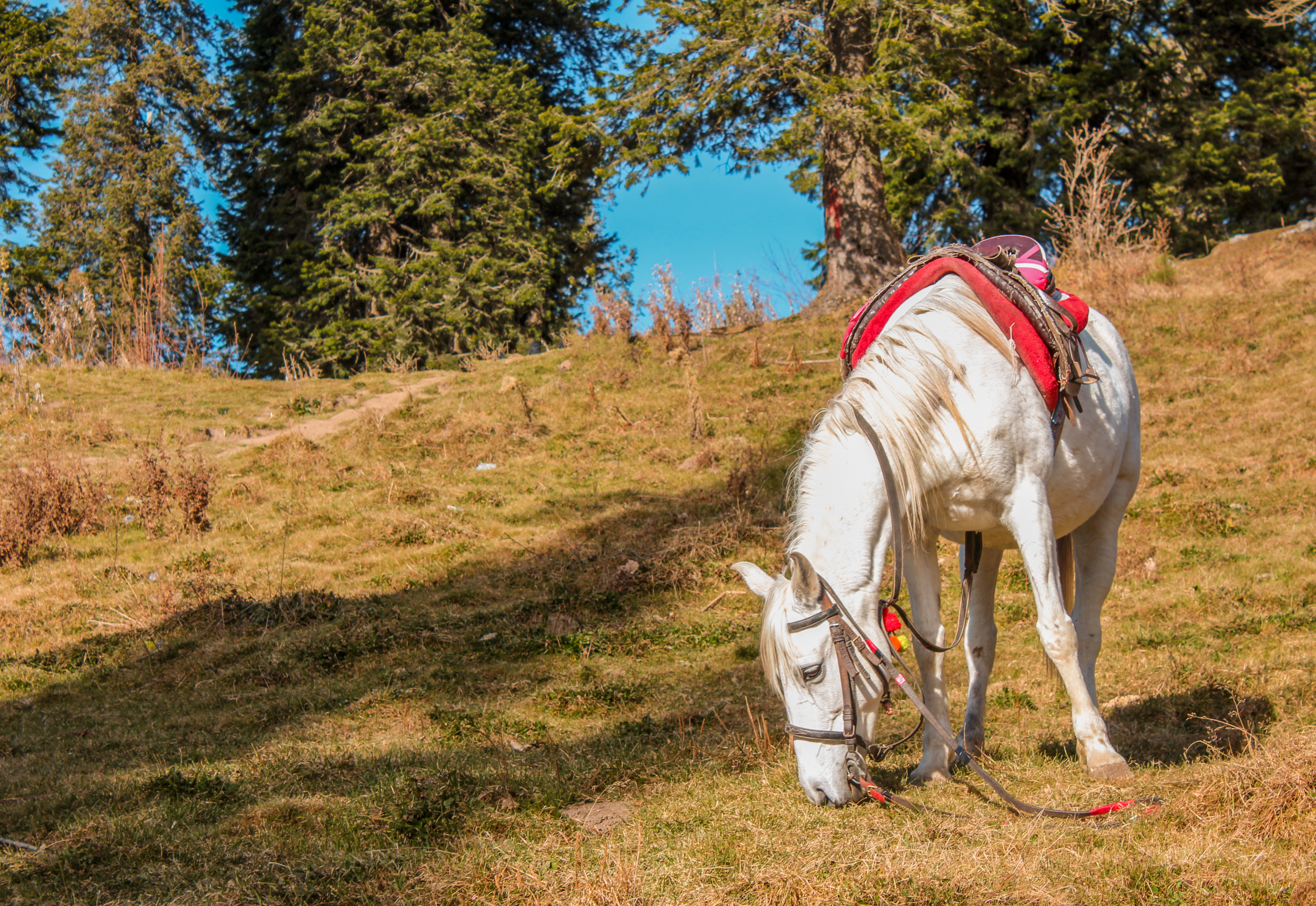

The Hirzai (Urdu: حرزایی) is a rare Pakistani breed of riding horse. It derives from cross-breeding of Baluchi horses with Arab stock. It is usually grey; other colours occur infrequently. The average height is 152 cm. In the twenty-first century it is an endangered breed.

== History ==
The Hirzai derives from cross-breeding of Baluchi horses with Arab stock. It is an endangered breed: its conservation status was listed as 'endangered' by the Food and Agriculture Organization of the United Nations in 2007, and in 2024 was listed in DAD-IS as 'unknown'. Population data has not been reported since 1988, when it was estimated to be between 100 and 1000 head.

== Characteristics ==
The Hirzai stands about 152 cm at the withers. The coat is usually grey; other colours occur only infrequently.
