= Shan Horse =

Burmese breed of horse

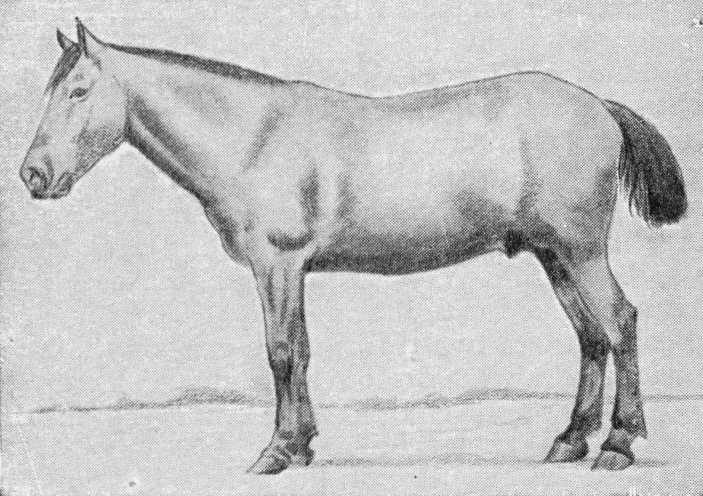
- Conservation status: FAO (2007): not at risk
- Other names: Shan Myinn; Shan Pony; Pegu Pony
- Country of origin: Myanmar
- Distribution: Shan Highland
- Use: riding horse; pack horse; draught horse

Traits
- Height: average 132 cm
- Colour: dark colours grey

The Shan Horse or Shan Myinn is a Burmese breed of small mountain horse or pony from the Shan Highland, in Shan State in eastern Myanmar (Burma). It was traditionally bred by the Shan people of that area. It is one of two horse breeds in Myanmar, the other being the Burmese Horse. It is similar to the Indian Manipuri, Spiti and Bhutia breeds of small horse or pony.

== History ==
A colonial-era description of the ponies of the Shan, published in the Gazetteer of Upper Burma and the Shan in 1901, calls them "small and coarse". According to an account from 1905, they were of similar size and type to the Mongolian, good carriers of weight, good at jumping, generally useful but slow.

The population of the Shan breed was last reported to DAD-IS in 1991, when there were 9000 stallions and 13000 breeding mares. In 2007 its conservation status was recorded by the FAO as "not at risk".

== Characteristics ==
The Shan Horse is a small, sturdy mountain horse, well adapted to hot and humid conditions and to altitudes of up to 6 000 m. Its coat is thicker than that of the Burmese breed. It is used as a pack horse, as a draught horse, and for riding. The coat may be dark or grey.
