= Azerbaijan horse =

Azerbaijani breed of horse

Azerbaijan
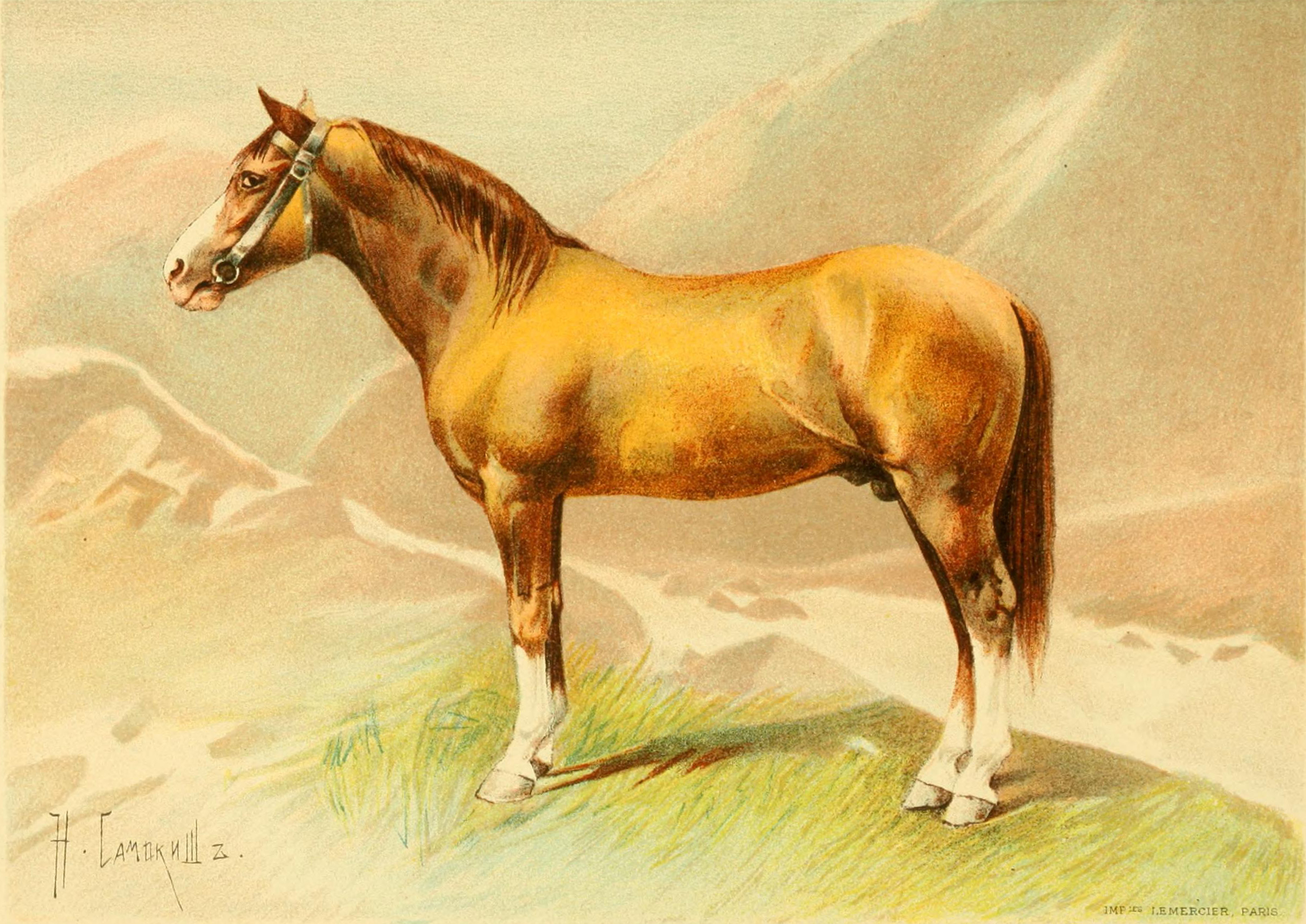
- Conservation status: FAO (2007): endangered
- Other names: Azerbaijani: Azərbaycan atı; Russian: Азербайджанская Azerbaidzhanskaya
- Country of origin: Azerbaijan

Traits
- Height: 135–142 cm

The Azerbaijan (Azerbaijani: Azərbaycan atı), is an Azerbaijani breed or group of breeds of riding horse of Oriental type. In 2007 it was listed by the FAO as endangered; in 2021 it was not among the horse breeds reported to DAD-IS.

Four strains or types of Azerbaijani are recognised as distinct breeds: the Deliboz, the Guba, the Shirvan and the Lesser Caucasus. The Karabakh may also be included in this group.

In 2007 there were just under 70 000 horses in Azerbaijan; 14–16% of those were Deliboz, while the other three strains or breeds constituted 8–10% of the total; 20–22% were of the Karabakh breed.
