= Miquelon horse =

French horse breed

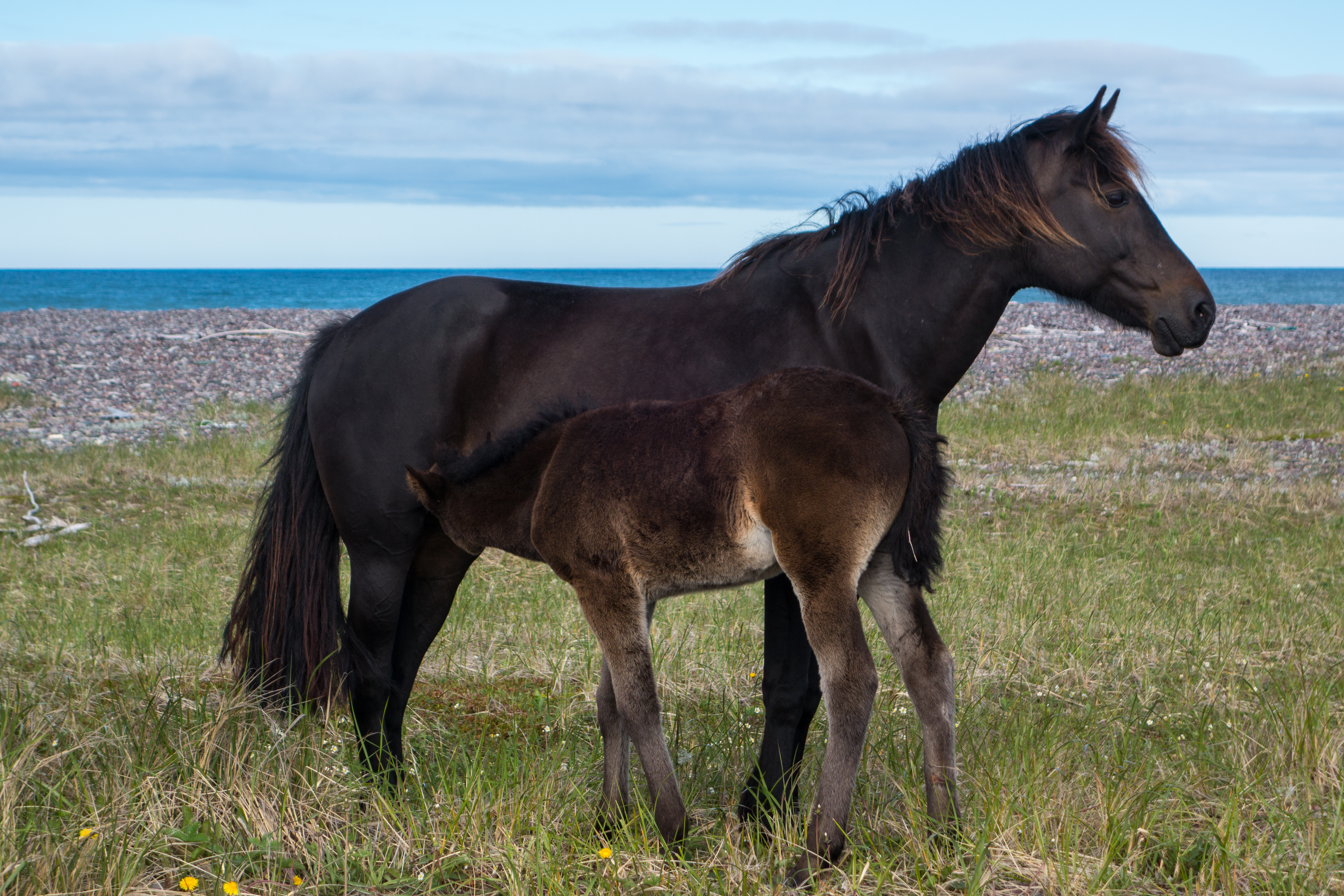
- Miquelon mare with her foal
- Country of origin: Saint Pierre and Miquelon

Traits
- Weight: About 450 kg (990 lb)
- Height: About 1.40 m (4.6 ft)

The Miquelon horse is a horse breed in the process of being characterized, established on the Saint Pierre and Miquelon archipelago (France), near the east coast of North America. It is similar in origin to the Newfoundland pony, and is probably descended from imported French horses, later influenced by the Clydesdale, Quarter Horse and Appaloosa. Moreover, it is closely related to the Canadian horse, from which it differs in size. The Miquelon, only having been studied since 2007, lives in semi-freedom outdoors during the warm season, and is mainly used as a trail riding horse.

In 2007, there were just 168 horses on the island.

== History ==
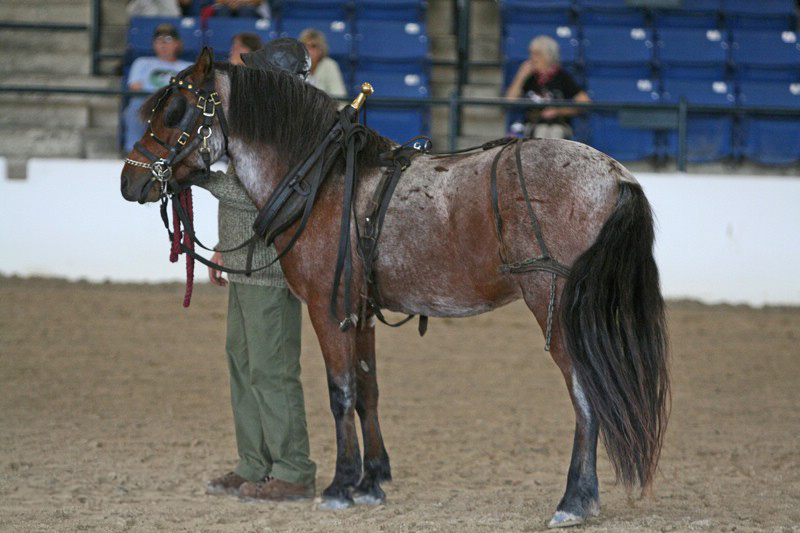
Canadian pony, closely related to the Miquelon horse

The Miquelon horse is probably descended from French animals, notably Normans and Bretons, and then received various influences, mainly from the Clydesdale, Quarter Horse, Appaloosa and, to a lesser extent, the Shetland pony. Several genetic characterization studies show a close relationship between Nordic horse breeds, Canadian ponies, the Sable Island horse and the Miquelon horse. The Newfoundland pony and Miquelon horses probably share a common ancestor, while the Sable Island pony is probably of more ancient origin.

In 1776, a census in Miquelon counted 73 horses. Between 1829 and 1834, the number of horses rose from 28 to 54; 72 horses were counted in 1837. In 1948, a small number of horses were still reported on the archipelago, where they were used for agricultural work. By the end of the 1960s, some 100 semi-wild horses were reported. A botanical study published in 1965 noted that "buttereau attached to vegetation has become established and is used as pasture by free-roaming horses [in Miquelon]".

On 15 November 1983, the 1901 association Groupement pour la Promotion du Cheval de Miquelon (GPCM by its acronym in French) was created, initially as a group of horse owners, gradually extending its activities to the improvement and trading of the local breed. In 1998, the GPCM set up its first stable.

The number of horses on the Saint Pierre and Miquelon archipelago declined between 2000 and 2007, from 200 to 168. The presence of these animals has only been studied since 2007, as part of a diagnosis relating to tourism, cultural relations, communications, sport and energy use. In 2008, a study was published by the Haras Nationaux to characterize the horse industry. The Miquelon horse, currently being characterized, is the predominant type present on this archipelago. Livestock identification was underway in 2008. Future objectives include the preservation and recognition of the Miquelon horse. In 2015, an association called Harmony Horse included the promotion of the Miquelon horse among its objectives.

== Description ==
The Miquelon horse is similar to the Canadian horse, but smaller in size. They stand around 1.40 m (4.6 ft) tall, with an average weight of 450 kg (990 lb). The breed standard is borrowed from that of the Canadian horse, and these horses are currently being registered. The horses tested belong to haplogroups B1 (shared with the Clydesdale, Standardbred and Caspian breeds), D2 (shared with the Newfoundland pony and the Lac La Croix Indian pony) and D3 (9%).

The health of the island's livestock is considered satisfactory. Miquelon horses are usually stabled from November until the arrival of spring, then kept outdoors for the rest of the year.

Two associations are involved in characterizing and preserving the breed: GPCM and Propriétaires Éleveurs Gardiens de l'Ancestrale Sélection des Équidés (PEGASE by its acronym in French), both based in Miquelon. The PEGASE association aims to avoid consanguinity and cross-breeding with horses of other origins, as well as to select a Pinto breed, hybridized with the Miquelon horse for greater hardiness.

== Usage ==
Miquelon horses are bred for a variety of purposes. The main one is trail riding, either individually or via associations, including to a limited extent for equestrian tourism with horse rental schemes. Between 10 and 15 foals are slaughtered and eaten locally for their meat each year, without being sold. These horses are also used for draft farming and skidding, and riding by children during summer holiday camps.

A traditional horse race is held every year. Observing the horses at liberty is also of interest to tourists.

== Spread of breeding ==
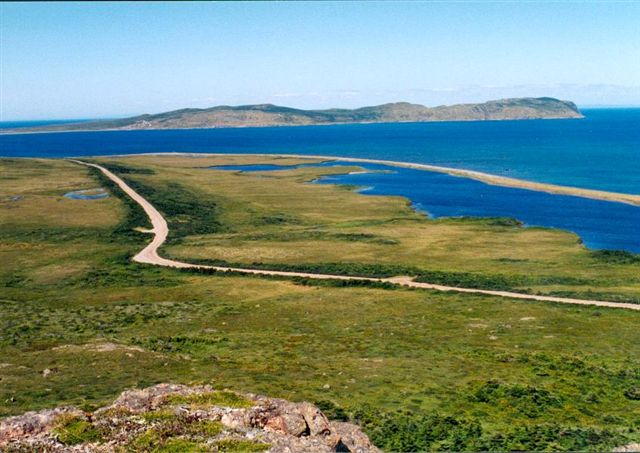
Grazing land on Miquelon island

La Première reports that the number of horses in Miquelon far exceeds the number of inhabitants.

This horse population is unique to Saint-Pierre-et-Miquelon. The total number of horses and ponies on the archipelago was 168 in 2007. In relation to the human population (6,125 inhabitants), this represents a ratio of 27 equines per 1,000 inhabitants, twice as many as in metropolitan France.

These animals live in the wild and belong mainly to private owners, with a small number belonging to the GPCM association. Increasing urbanization is making it difficult for owners to find grazing land, and there is a risk of overgrazing. Animals are generally taken by boat to Miquelon, where grazing land is more plentiful, during the summer season. Langlade has plenty of grazing land. Most of the archipelago's inhabitants support the idea of preserving the breed, despite the existence of minor conflicts relating to damage caused by these horses.

== See also ==
- List of horse breeds
- Horse breeding in France

== Bibliography ==
- Y., Pestel (1987). Saint-Pierre et Miquelon: les chevaux (in French). Vol. 193. Cheval Magazine. ISSN 0245-3614.
- Rousseau, Élise (2014). Tous les chevaux du monde (in French). Delachaux et Niestlé. ISBN 978-2-603-01865-1.
- Lumalé, Françoise (2008). Étude de la filière cheval à Saint Pierre et Miquelon : Préconisations pour la mise en place d'un schéma de développement. Rapport intermédiaire (PDF). Haras nationaux.
