= Guizhou pony =

Breed of horse

- Country of origin: China

The Guizhou pony is a small pony from the Guizhou province of China.

== History ==
As Guizhou is a mountainous province, agriculture was developed as early as 770 B.C. in the basin area of the province, and trade in horses and salt was of great importance. Some breeds from outside the country were introduced in the 1950s but did not bring beneficial results, so the Guizhou is still bred in pure form and is classified as a native breed.

== Uses ==
In plantation areas the horses were used mainly for cultivation and transport. In hilly regions this breed has always been a good pack horse, somewhat smaller than the type used for agricultural purposes. The Guizhou horse is active and vigorous, good for travel in hilly regions, and can trot at a steady speed for long distances. This breed is the main power source for the mountain farmers.

== Characteristics ==
Approximately half of the Guizhou horses are bay or chestnut, others being gray, black, and dun. This horse is compact and short bodied with a solid build. The head has a straight profile, ears small and set up. In the riding type the neck tends to be sloped, while the pack type has a level neck. The withers are medium in height and length; the chest is of good width and depth; the rump is short and sloping but well muscled; the shoulder is short and tends to be straight. The forelegs have good posture while the hind legs are often sickled; the hoof is solid and tough and shoes are unnecessary even in the mountains. The skin is thin; mane and tail are think. Guizhou horses are willing and obedient and have a kind, patient temperament.

== See also ==
- Chinese Guoxia
