= Albanian horse =

Albanian breed of horse

Albanian
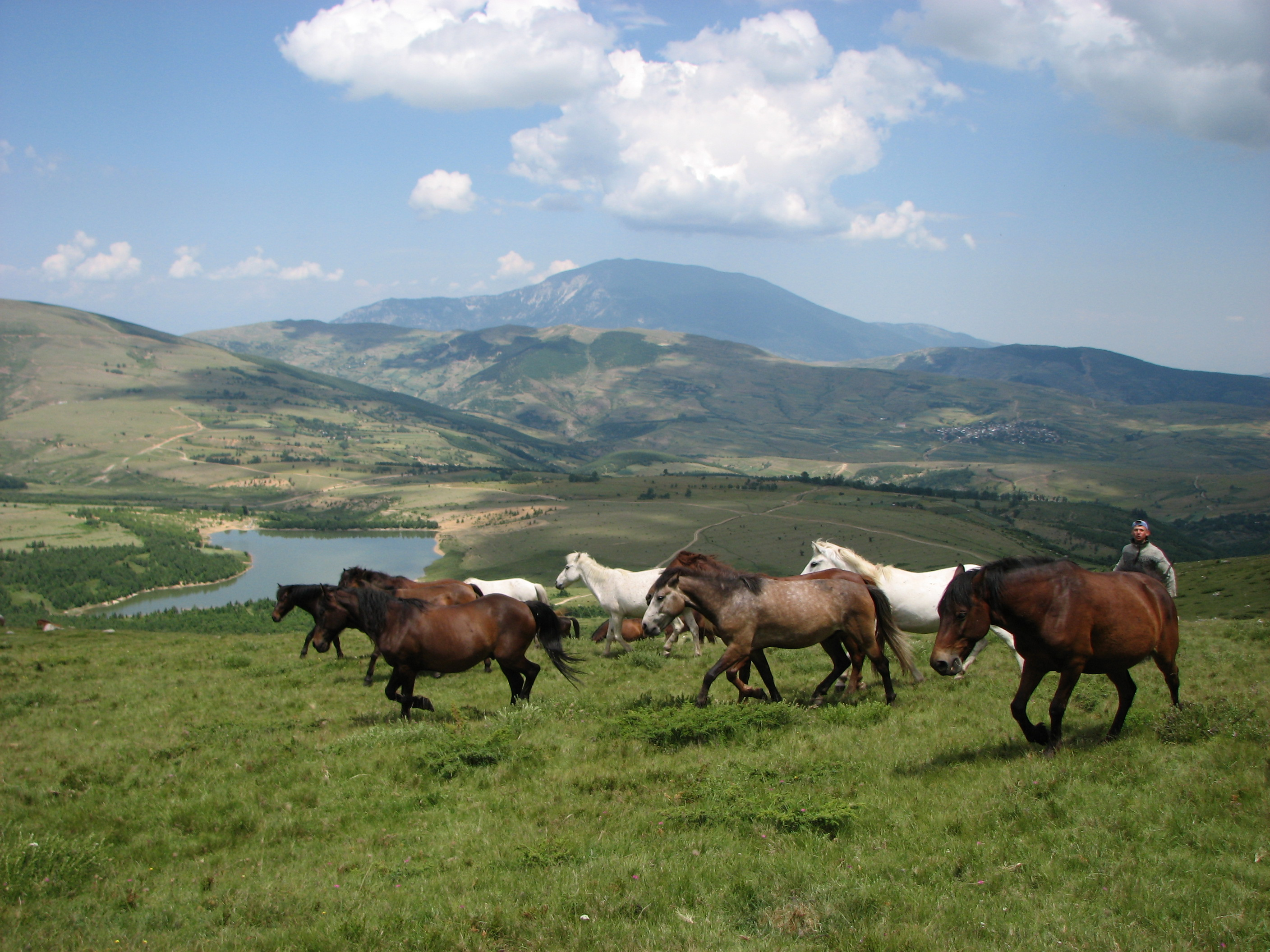
- Horses near Shishtavec, in Kukës County

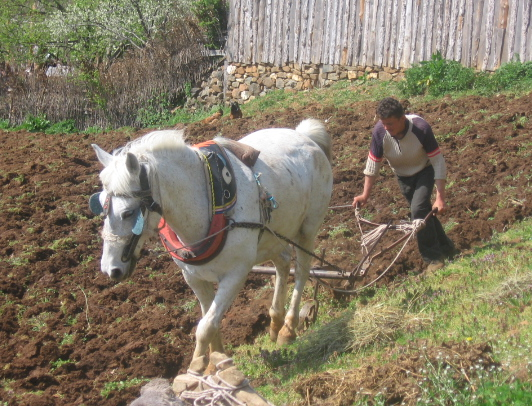
- Ploughing near Zapo village
- Conservation status: FAO (2007): not at risk
- Other names: Albanian: Kali shqiptar
- Country of origin: Albania
- Use: pack; harness; riding

Traits
- Weight: Male: average 304 kg (670 lb); Female: average 260 kg (570 lb)
- Height: mountain type: 127–130 cm (12.2–12.3 h); Myzeqeja type: 132–142 cm (13.0–14.0 h); Male: average 140 cm (13.3 h); Female: average 136 cm (13.2 h)
- Colour: dark colours or grey

The Albanian (Albanian: Kali Shqiptar) is the only indigenous horse breed in Albania. It is a small horse, and similar to other Balkan horses. Two types are distinguished, a mountain type and a lowland type, which may be called "Myzeqeja" after the lowland Myzeqeja region.

== History ==
Before the communist era in Albania, the Albanian horse had a good reputation for endurance and stamina. From 1904 Arab stock was used for cross-breeding; Haflinger and Nonius stock was later used.

== Use ==
The horse was until recently the principal means of transport in the country, which had no tractors: it was thus essential to the national economy. Horses were used by the Albanian military until 1974. The Albanian horse is used almost exclusively in harness or as a pack animal, and only occasionally for riding.
