= Burmese Horse =

Burmese breed of horse

- Conservation status: FAO (2007): not at risk; DAD-IS (2026): unknown
- Other names: Bama Myinn
- Country of origin: Myanmar
- Use: pack animal, cart-horse

Traits
- Height: Male: 145 cm

The Burmese Horse or Bama Myinn is a Burmese breed of small horse. It is one of two horse breeds in Myanmar, the other being the Shan Horse.

== History ==
The Burmese Horse is one of two horse breeds in Myanmar, the other being the Shan Horse. The two are sometimes treated as synonyms, but are separately reported to DAD-IS by the Livestock Breeding and Veterinary Department of the Ministry of Livestock, Fisheries and Rural Development of Myanmar.

The population of the Burmese breed was last reported to DAD-IS in 1991, when there were 26000 breeding mares. In 2007 its conservation status was recorded by the Food and Agriculture Organization of the United Nations as "not at risk"; in 2026 its status was listed in DAD-IS as "unknown".

== Characteristics ==
The Burmese Horse is well adapted to the hot and humid conditions of the country. Its coat is not as thick as that of the Shan Horse. Height at the withers is variously reported as 145 cm for males and as 122 to 132 cm without distinction of sex.

== Use ==
It is used principally as a pack animal or to pull carts.
