= Bardigiano =

Breed of horse

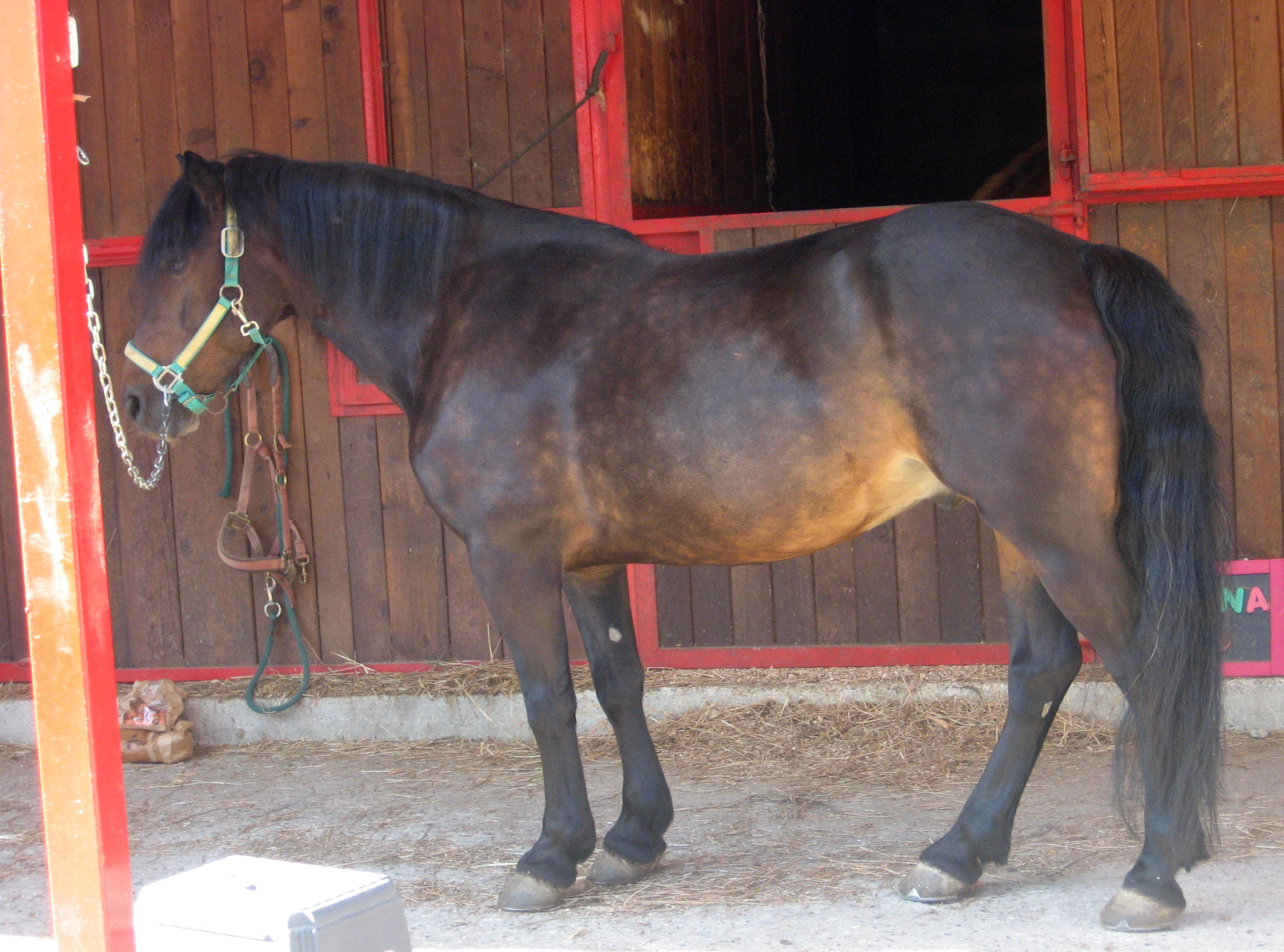
- Conservation status: FAO (2007): not at risk; DAD-IS (2004): at risk/endangered
- Other names: Cavallo Bardigiano
- Country of origin: Italy
- Distribution: Emilia-Romagna; Liguria; Tuscany; Germany; Hungary
- Standard: Associazione Provinciale Allevatori, Parma

The Bardigiano is a traditional Italian breed of small horse. It originates in the region of Emilia Romagna and takes its name from the town of Bardi, in the province of Parma. It is strongly associated with Bardi, the Valle del Ceno and the Val di Taro, and surrounding areas of the Tusco-Emilian Apennines of Parma.

It is a robust and hardy horse, agile and sure-footed over difficult ground, and well-suited to work as a pack-animal in mountainous terrain; it may also be used in harness and for riding. A stud-book was established in 1977, and is held by the Associazione Provinciale Allevatori (regional animal breeders' association) of Parma. The breed is widely distributed in Italy, with breeders in 26 Italian provinces; a recent study examined 3556 stud book entries for living horses. Due to these relatively large numbers, the breed is not considered to be at risk of extinction, but is classed as "vulnerable".

In 1994, the breed standard was modified with the intention of increasing the suitability of the Bardigiano as a saddle horse while preserving its character.

== History ==
During World War I and World War II, Bardigiano mares were used to produce first-class mules, and in the process the number of purebred Bardigianos was significantly reduced. After World War II, in a move that is now widely considered a mistake, a diverse range of stallions from various breeds were introduced to reestablish the breed. However, this caused the breed to deteriorate and begin to lose its defining characteristics. Thus, in 1972, a committee was formed that has since successfully reestablished the Bardigiano breed.

== Characteristics ==
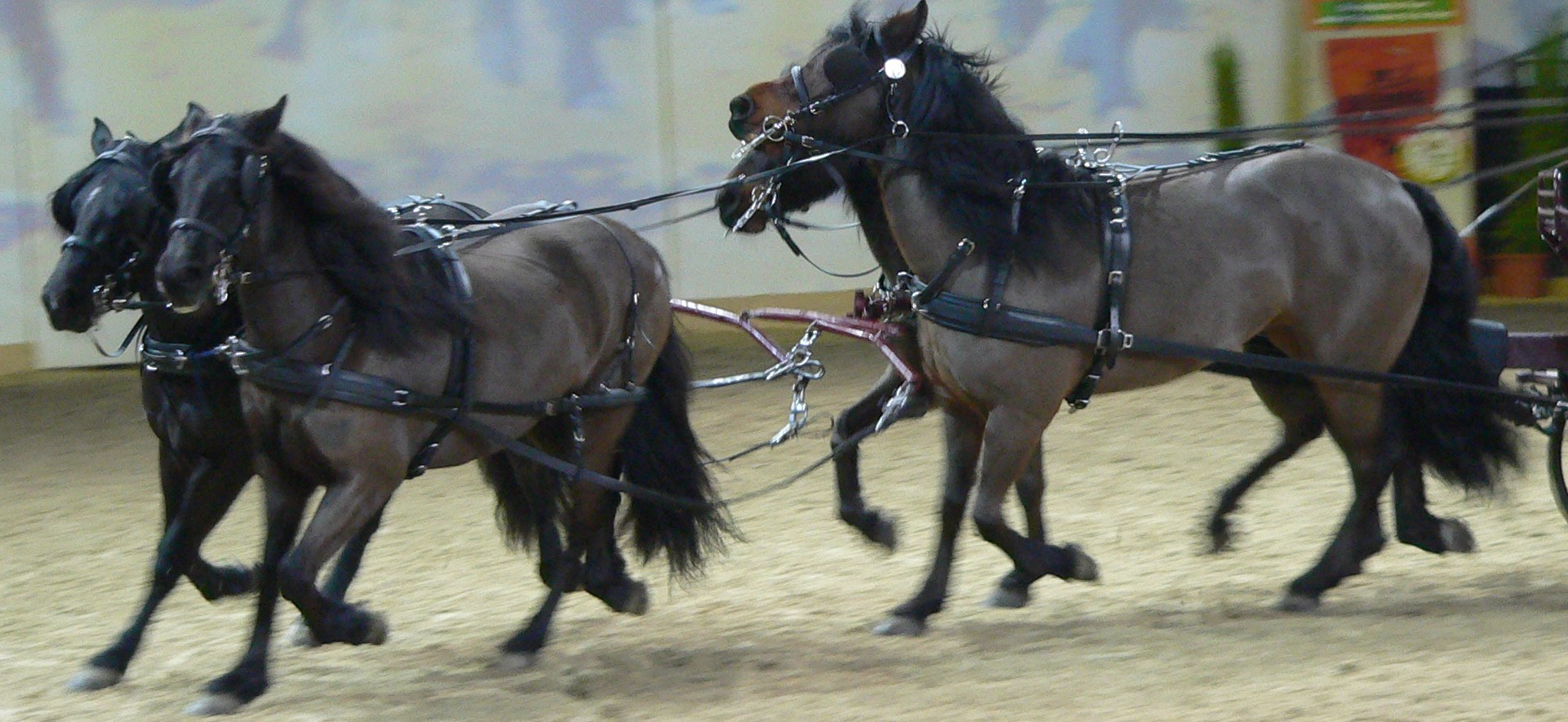
In harness, four-in-hand

The height range for the Bardigiano is fixed at 140–149 cm for males and 135–147 cm for females; horses outside these ranges are not admitted for registration. The only recognized coat colour is bay, and dark bay is preferred. Chestnuts and light bays are not recognized. Limited rabicano and white markings on the legs and face are allowed, but white facial markings with excessive lateral extension (commonly referred to as "bald-faced") are not. Physical characteristics of the breed include a small head with a straight or concave profile, low withers, straight back, deep girth, and overall a muscular appearance.
