= Hungarian Sport Horse =

Breed of horse

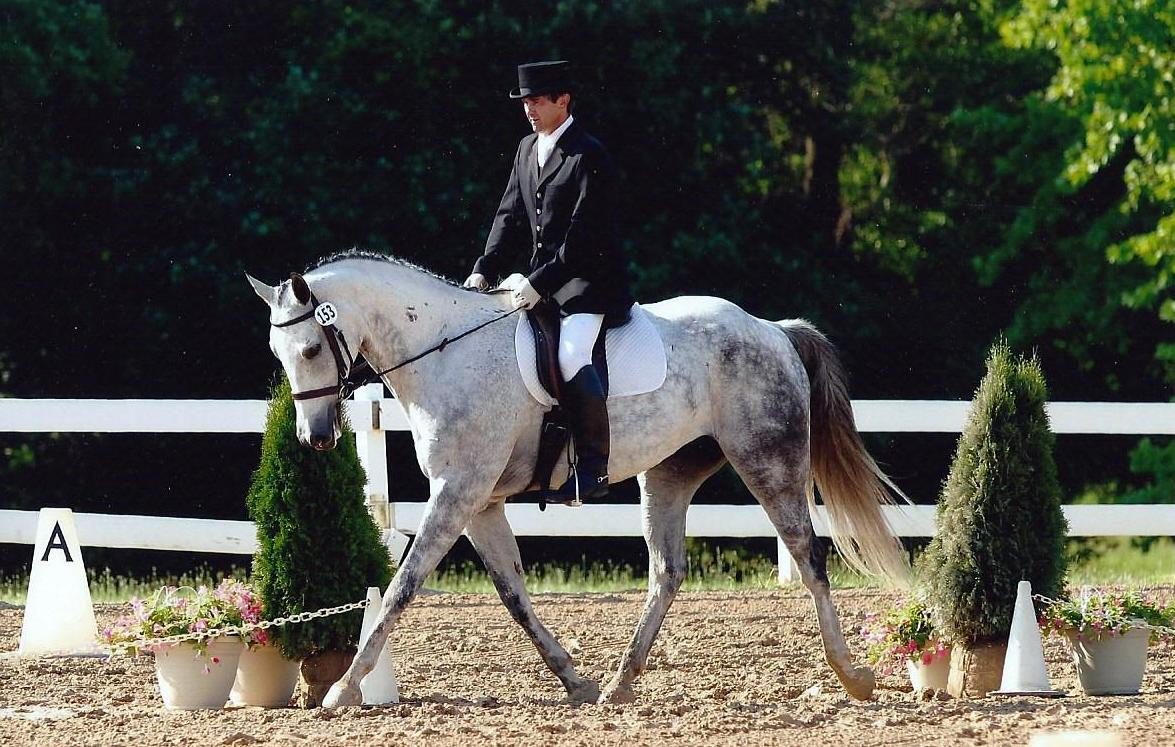
- Conservation status: FAO (2007): no data
- Other names: Hungarian: Magyar sportló; Hungarian Warmblood
- Country of origin: Hungary
- Use: equestrian sports

Traits
- Weight: Female: average 600 kg
- Height: 162–173 cm; Female: average 165.7 cm

The Hungarian Sport Horse, Hungarian: Magyar sportló, is a modern Hungarian breed of sporting horse. Like the Furioso-North Star, the Gidran, and the Nonius, it was developed at the Hungarian State Stud Mezőhegyes, in Békés county in the Southern Great Plain region of south-eastern Hungary. At the end of 2012, the total number for the breed was reported to be 1091. The breeders' association is the Magyar Sportlótenyésztők Országos Egyesülete, or Association of Hungarian Sporthorse Breeders.
