= Pentro horse =

Italian breed of horse

Pentro
- Conservation status: FAO (2007): no data; DAD-IS (2023): at risk/endangered
- Other names: Cavallo del Pentro; Cavallo Pentro; Pentro Horse
- Country of origin: Italy
- Distribution: Molise
- Standard: Associzione Italiana Allevatori
- Use: pack/draught; working riding; horsemeat; pony trekking

Traits
- Height: 133–142 cm; Male: average 137 cm; Female: average 133 cm

The Pentro or Cavallo Pentro is an endangered Italian breed of small rustic horse. It originates in the upper valley of the Volturno in the southern Italian region of Molise, close to its borders with Abruzzo, Campania and Lazio, and takes its name from the ancient Samnite tribe of the Pentri, who lived in that area. The population is concentrated in the comune of Montenero Val Cocchiara in the province of Isernia. It is one of the fifteen indigenous horse "breeds of limited distribution" recognised by the Associazione Italiana Allevatori, the Italian breeders' association.

== History ==
Like many Italian breeds the Pentro is raised on open land year-round, where it has to fend off wolves, which have returned to the Italian countryside in considerable numbers.

The Pentro horse is threatened with extinction.

In 2003 the total population was about 250, of which no more than 150 displayed the morphological characteristics of the breed. The surviving members live in the Pantano della Zittola, a broad plain extending over about 2200 hectares, lying on the edge of the Abruzzo National Park in the mountainous region between Abruzzo and Molise.

There is no established conservation programme in the area and the horses there are raised as feral animals viewed as characteristic fauna of the land.
