= Balearic horse =

Breed of horse

Balearic horse is a horse breed or breeds originating in the Balearic Islands. A number of works include a breed entry or grouping called the "Balearic horse" or "Balearic pony." However, these sources are unclear what specific breeds are in this grouping and may or may not include the following breeds found in these islands:

- The Mallorquín horse
- The Menorquín horse
- The Spanish Trotter
