= Petiso Argentino =

Breed of pony

The Petiso Argentino is a new pony breed developed from Shetland ponies and Welsh ponies imported by Argentine farmers in the first half of the 20th century. There is undoubtedly also a bit of Criollo blood in this pony, judging by the colour and conformation of the breed. As time passed, the Shetland and Welsh breeds were no longer distinguishable and the new breed, Petiso Argentino, was created.
