= Lijiang pony =

Breed of horse

- Country of origin: China

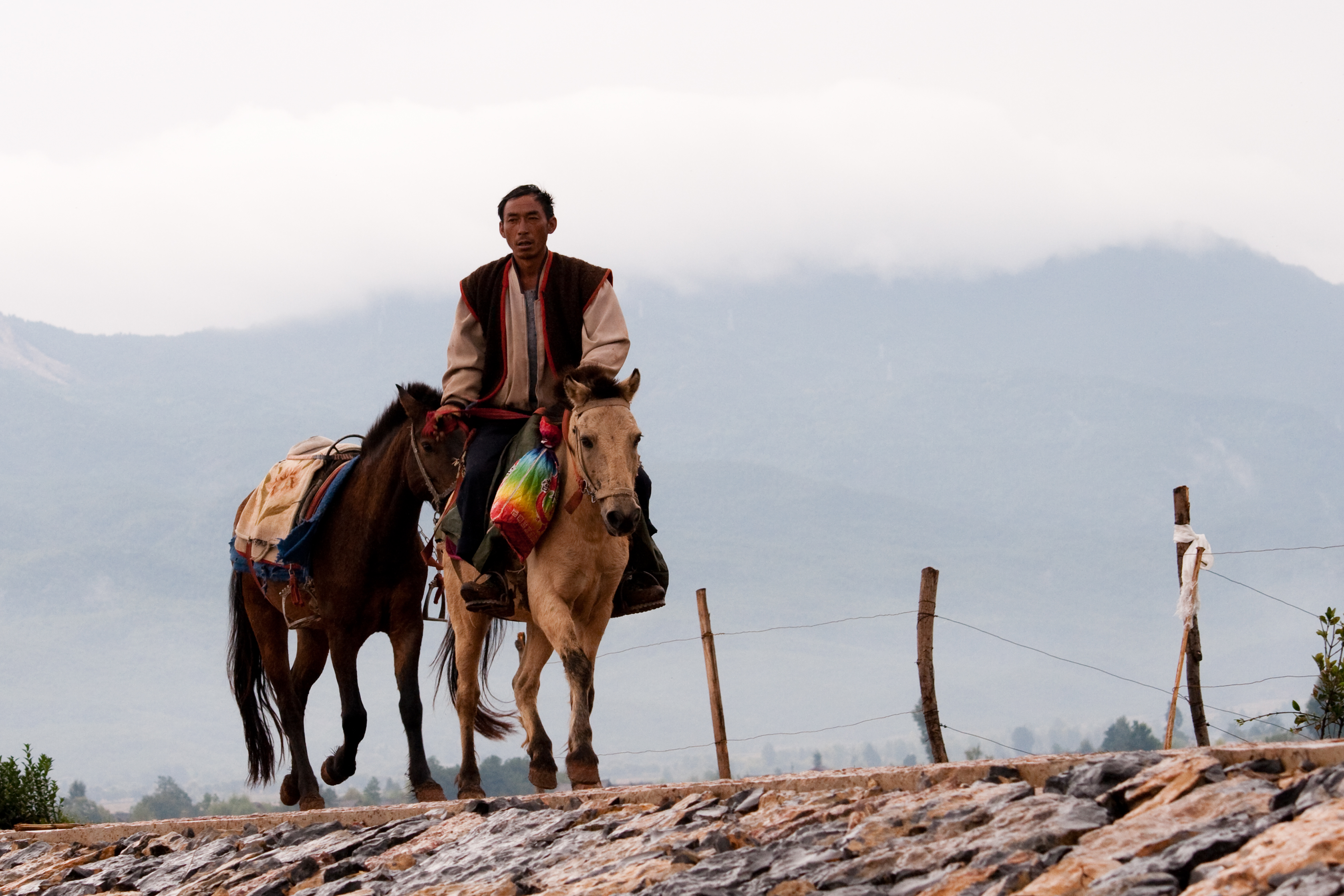

Lijiang ponies are a newly developed breed of horse, restricted to the Lijiang District, in China. This is an area of high altitude with a greatly varied climate. The economy required a more powerful pony than was found in the area, so in 1944 the Arabian, Yili, Hequ, Kabarda and small type Ardennes were introduced. Crossbreeding and interbreeding of the progeny has developed a horse ideal for the needs of the area. Today, there are approximately 4,000 Lijiang ponies.

Lijiang ponies were crossed with Arab and Arab-Kabarda and the offspring were increased in size to about 12.2 hands, but additional work to increase the size of this breed has not yet been successful.
