= Virginia Highlander =

Breed of horse

- Country of origin: United States

Traits
- Distinguishing features: Small size, gaited

The Virginia Highlander is a small breed of horse with a four-beat ambling gait. It is between 13 and 14 hands (52 and 56 inches, 132 and 142 cm) high. Coat colors include roan, chestnut, black and gray, and the occasional white. Breed characteristics include a good temperament and a natural singlefoot gait.

Pogo was the inspiration for the Virginia Highlander breed. He was a chestnut stallion foaled in 1960. Pogo was a small crossbred horse thought to have been sired by a Welsh pony, out of an Arabian/Tennessee Walker mare. He had a natural singlefoot gait. His owner William (Bill) M. Pugh was intrigued by the good-natured, naturally gaited stallion. He developed a breeding program for small gaited horses by crossing Pogo and his descendants with other Arabians, Tennessee Walkers, Morgans, American Saddlebreds, Hackney ponies and Welsh ponies. He bred the horses that met his criteria for conformation, disposition and gaited ability. The registry began with two foundation stallions named Shadow of the Ridge, and Pugh's Red Cloud.

The Virginia Highlander Horse Association was formed in the early 1990s with the intention to promote the Virginia Highlander breed through registry and education. Twenty-two horses (20 mares and 2 stallions) made up the original foundation stock. By June 2004, there were more than 130 registered Virginia Highlanders beyond the original foundation animals.
