= Anadolu Pony =

Turkish breed of horse

Anadolu
- Conservation status: FAO (2007): no data; DAD-IS (2025): unknown
- Other names: Anadolu Yerci; Anadoly Yerci; Anadolu Pony; Anatolian
- Country of origin: Turkey
- Use: riding horse; pack animal; light draught

Traits
- Height: 124–142 cm

The Anadolu or Anatolian is a Turkish breed of small horse within the broad Anatolian Native group of breeds. It has some relation to a broad range of western Asian breeds of riding horse.

== History ==
The Anadolu is a traditional breed of Anatolia – the Asian part of Turkey, from which the name of the breed derives – and of eastern and south-eastern Anatolia in particular. It has some relation to a broad range of western Asian breeds, among them the Akhal-Teke, the Arab, the Deliboz, the Kabarda, the Karabakh, the Persian and the Turkoman.

It is the most numerous horse breed of Turkey, but no population data has ever been reported to DAD-IS; in 2025 its conservation status was unknown.

== Characteristics ==
The horses usually stand between 124 and 142 cm at the withers. The profile of the head is variable, ranging from concave or dished to convex.

== Use ==
The Anadolu may be used as a riding horse, as a pack animal or to pull light vehicles.
