= Belarusian Harness Horse =

Belarusian breed of horse

Belarus Harness Horse
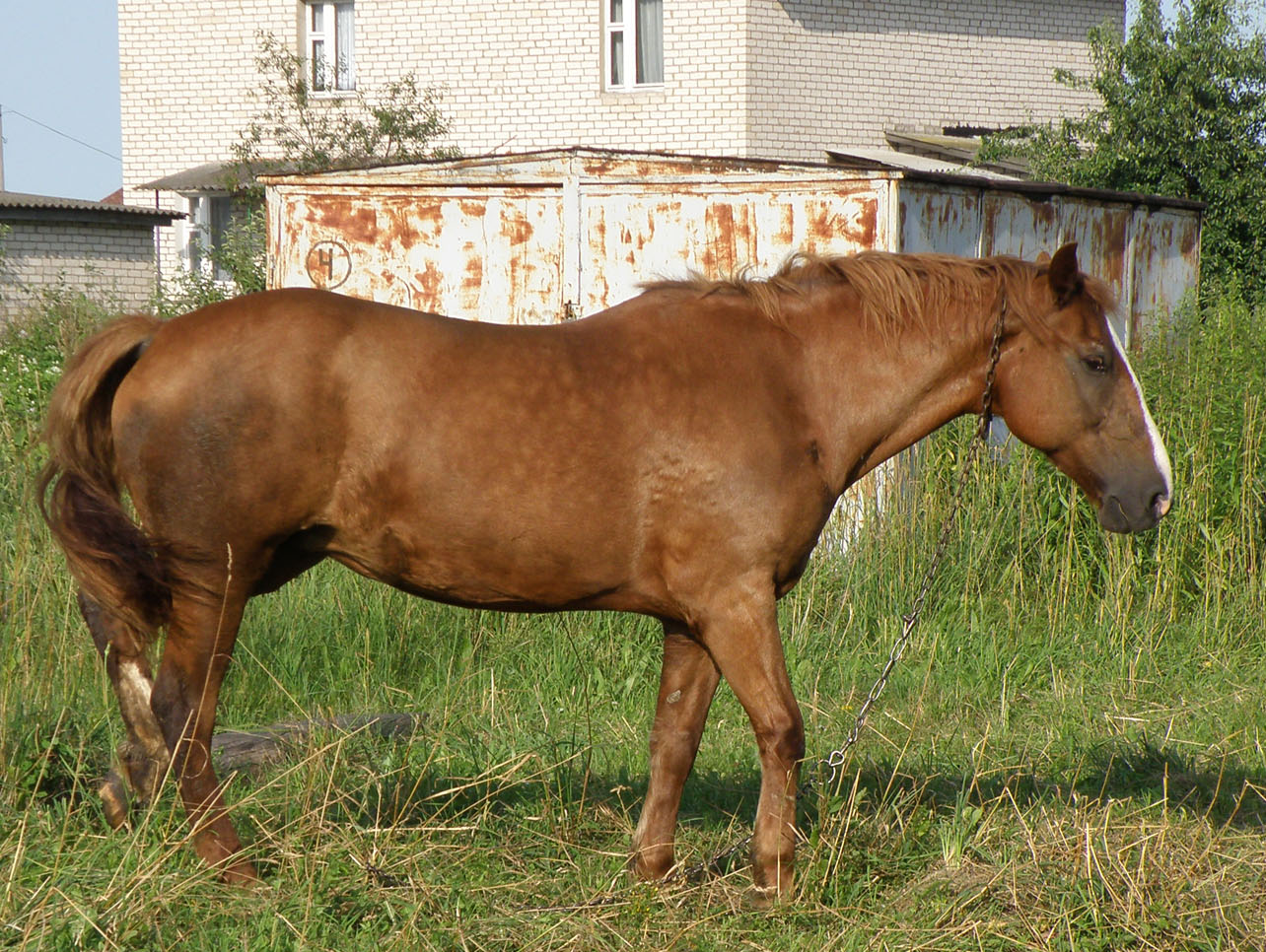
- Conservation status: FAO (2007): not at risk; DAD-IS (2020): unknown
- Other names: Belarusian: Беларускі запражны конь; Belarusian: Bielaruski zapražny koń; Belorusskaya; Belorusskaya upryazhnaya; Byelorussian Carriage Horse; Byelorussian Coach Horse; Byelorussian Draught Horse; Byelorussian Harness Horse; White Russian Carriage Horse; White Russian Coach Horse; White Russian Draught Horse; White Russian Harness Horse
- Country of origin: Belarus
- Distribution: Belarus; Russian Federation
- Use: draught power; milk; meat

Traits
- Weight: Male: average: 540 kg; Female: average: 495 kg
- Height: 148–157 cm; Male: average: 153 cm; Female: average: 150 cm
- Colour: bay; chestnut; striped dun

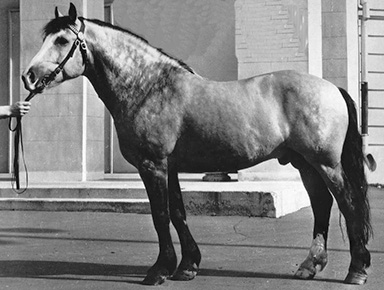
The stallion Orlik I, born in 1950

The Belarus Harness Horse, Belarusian: Беларускі запражны конь, 'Bielaruski zapražny koń', is a Belarusian breed of draught horse. It was bred for use in agriculture, and is also used to produce mare's milk and horsemeat.

== History ==
The Belorusskaya was bred in the late nineteenth and early twentieth centuries, principally in the western part of what is now Belarus, which was for much of the twentieth century the Byelorussian Soviet Socialist Republic. The aim was to create an agricultural draught horse adapted to local conditions, capable of working on sandy, swampy or woodland terrain. Local mares, many of them of Polesian type, were put to imported stallions. The majority of these were of the Norwegian Dølehest draught breed, but there was also some Ardennes and Brabant influence. By the 1980s the breeding programme was close to completion; two volumes of the stud-book had been issued, in which 616 mares and 135 stallions were recorded.

In 1980 the total breed population was some 93000, of which almost 28000 were pure-bred.

The breed was officially recognised in Belarus in 2000.

== Characteristics ==
The Belarus Harness Horse usually stands between 148 and 157 cm at the withers. The average height for mares is about 150 cm, and for stallions and geldings is about 3 cm more; average body weights are 495 kg and 540 kg respectively. The coat may be of any of the usual dark colours; striped dun and yellow also occur.

== Use ==
The Belarus Harness Horse was initially bred for use in agriculture; it is also used to produce mare's milk and horsemeat. The milk yield is approximately 9 kg per day, but may exceed 2500 kg in a lactation of 180 days.
