= British Spotted Pony =

British breed of pony

- Conservation status: FAO (2007): not listed; DAD-IS (2022): unknown; RBST (2022–23): not listed
- Country of origin: United Kingdom
- Standard: British Spotted Pony Society

Traits
- Height: not over 147 cm

The British Spotted Pony is a British breed of pony characterised by a spotted coat. The height at the withers does not exceed 147 cm.

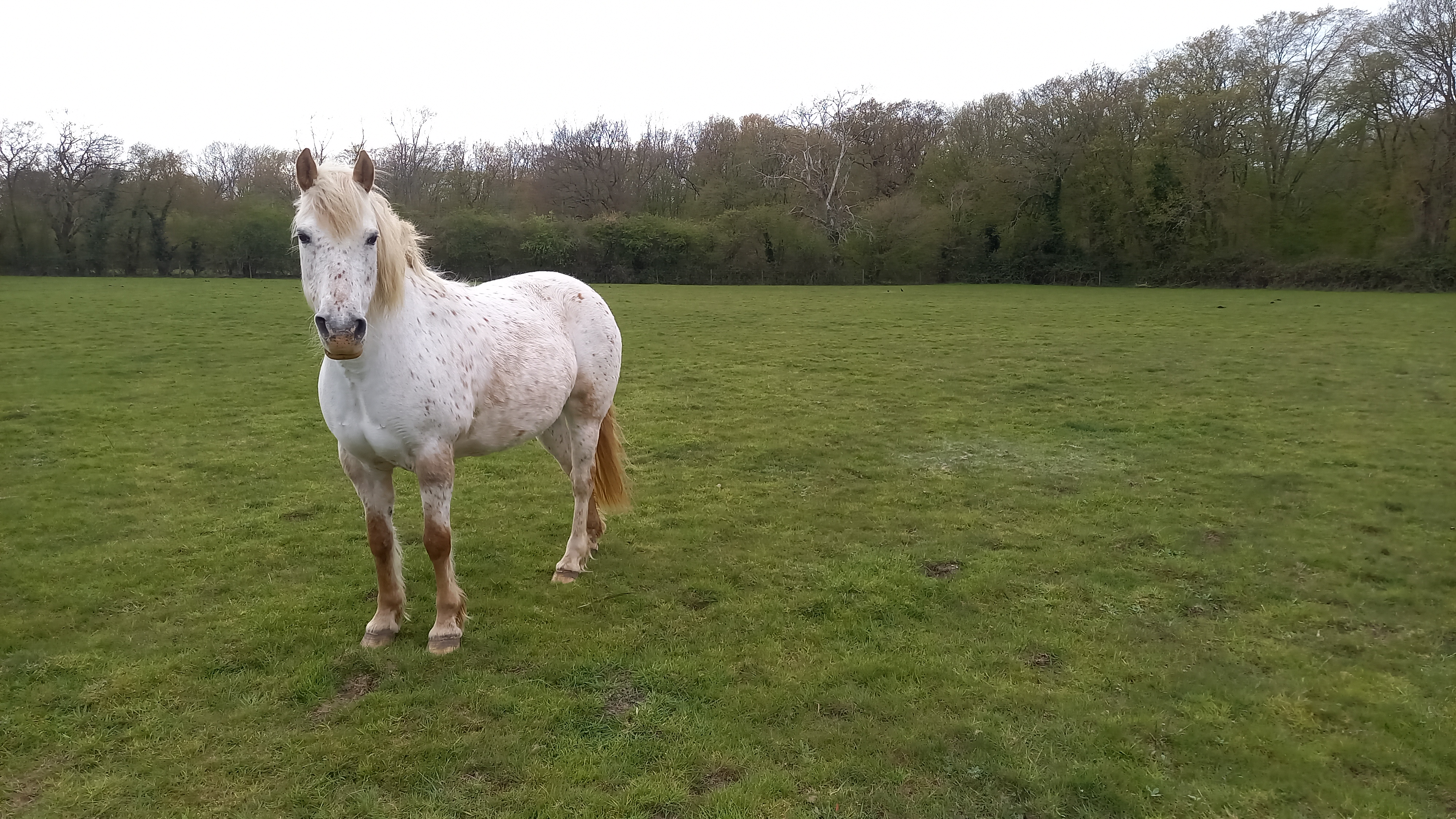
British Spotted Pony mare on a field in Suffolk

== History ==
The presence of spotted horses in parts of Europe from Iberia to Turkey is documented in manuscripts and tapestries as far back as the Middle Ages. Among the many European breeds that can have a spotted coat is a strain of the Welsh Pony. A document from 1298 mentions that Edward I of England had a spotted Welsh horse; a spotted Welsh Cob stallion was foaled in 1916.

The British Spotted Pony descends from indigenous Celtic ponies, particularly from south-west England and from Wales. A breed society, the British Spotted Horse and Pony Society, was formed in 1946. In 1976 the British Spotted Horse – though unconnected to the Appaloosa breed of the United States – was renamed to British Appaloosa, and the breed society split. The British Spotted Pony Society was formed in that year.

It may be a rare breed: one source gives a total number of 800 for it. It is reported to DAD-IS, but no population data has ever been entered; it is not on the watchlist of the Rare Breeds Survival Trust.

== Characteristics ==
The pony carries the genes for the spotted colouring, which may produce coats of varying patterns; other characteristics associated with the pattern, such as mottled pink skin on the muzzle and at the natural openings, white sclera of the eyes, and striped hooves, are also seen. Solid-coloured animals with demonstrable Spotted Pony ancestry are registered in a separate section of the stud-book; ponies with piebald or skewbald coat patterns are disqualified from registration.

It is robust and hardy, with typical pony conformation. The eyes are large, the ears small, and the mane and tail usually abundant. The height at the withers may not exceed 147 cm (14.2 h).
