= Abaco Barb =

Extinct Bahamian breed of horse

- Conservation status: extinct
- Other names: Abaco Horse; Abaco Spanish Colonial Horse
- Country of origin: Bahamas
- Distribution: Great Abaco
- Use: none

Traits
- Height: 130 cm
- Colour: dark colours; splashed white pinto

Notes
- feral population

The Abaco Barb or Abaco Spanish Colonial Horse was a breed or population of feral horses on the island of Great Abaco, in the Bahamas. It became extinct in 2015; it was the only horse breed of the Bahamas.

== History ==
The origin of the Abaco horses is not known. It is possible that horses came ashore on Great Abaco from Spanish ships wrecked on its coasts, and also possible that horses were brought to the island by Loyalists who came there following the American Revolution. The most probable explanation is that they derived from horses used by Cuban forestry workers in the early nineteenth century. There were at one time more than two hundred of them, but the population declined rapidly in the later twentieth century as a result of human intervention and destruction of their habitat. Various conservation attempts were made, but the last horse, a mare, died in 2015. Some tissue has been preserved, which could be used for cloning.
