= Latvian horse =

Latvian breed of warmblood horse

Latvian
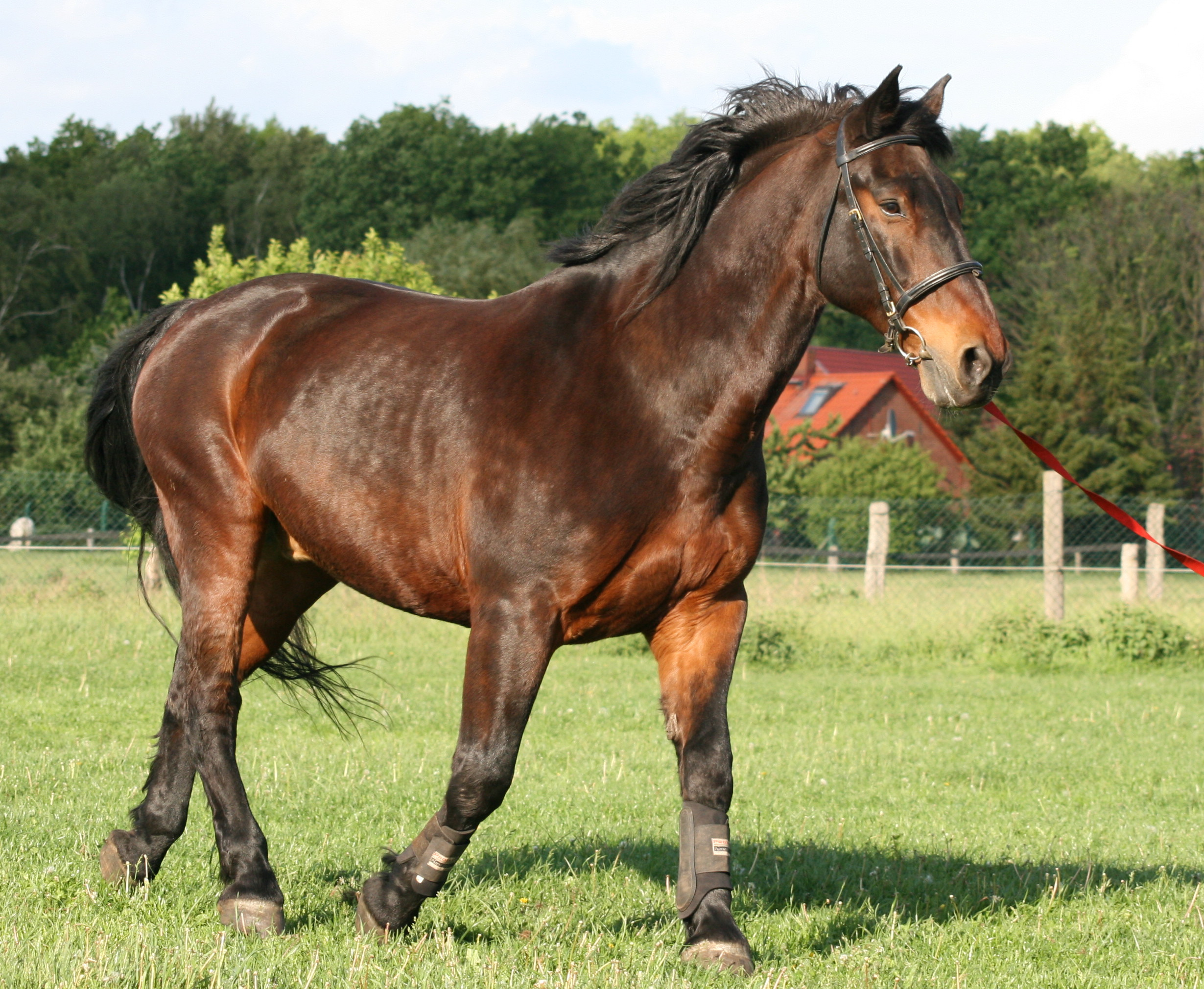
- Conservation status: FAO, 2007: endangered-maintained
- Other names: Latvian: Latvijas šķirne; Latvian: Latvijas zirgi; Russian: Latviiskaya; Latvian Harness Horse; Latvian Carriage Horse; Latvian Coach Horse; Latvian Draught; Latvian Riding Horse
- Country of origin: Latvia

Traits
- Weight: Male: 600 kg; Female: 500 kg
- Height: Male: 160 – 164 cm; Female: 158 – 161 cm

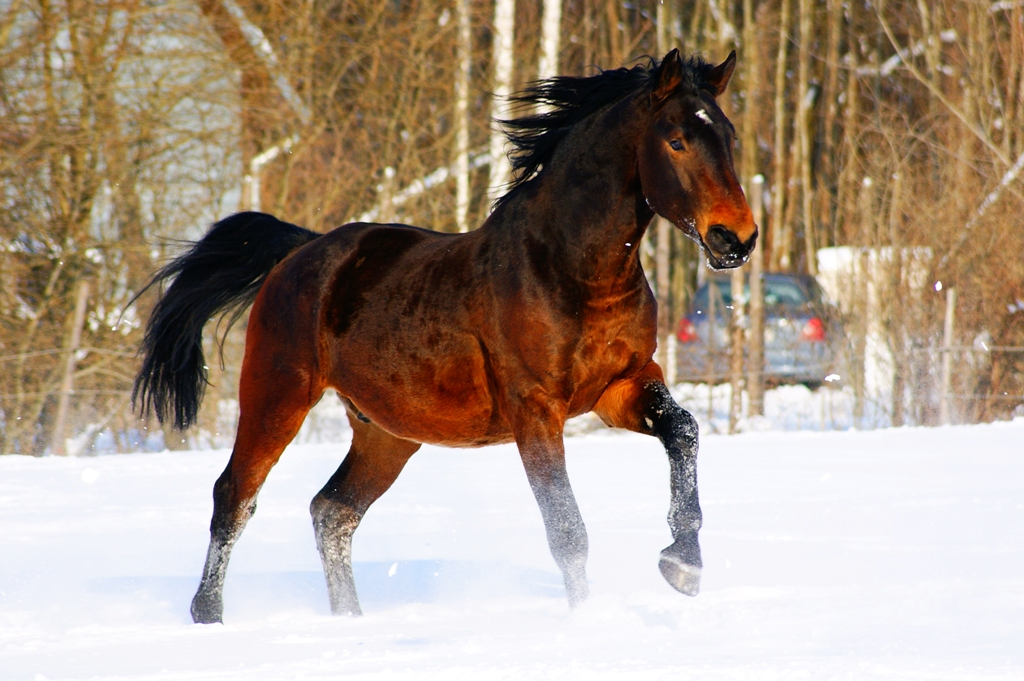
Latvian harness horse

The Latvian Horse (Latvian: Latvijas šķirne or Latvijas zirgi) is a purpose-bred warmblood horse breed from Latvia. Breeding began in Latvia in the early twentieth century, and a herd book was established in 1927. The breed was officially recognised in 1952. There are two types, sometimes called the Latvian Harness Horse and the Latvian Riding Horse. The harness type was predominant until about 1960, when demand for sport horses increased and more of the saddle type were bred.

== History ==
The origins of the Latvian breed go back to 1856, when western European horses were cross-bred with native Latvian horses. In 1890 planned breeding was begun from ten different breeds, principally Hanoverian and Oldenburger, with some Holsteiner influence. More than 100 Oldenburgers (65 stallions and 42 mares) were imported from Germany and the Netherlands between 1920 and 1941, and these were the basis of the breed, which was officially recognised in 1952. From about 1960 or 1970, Hanoverian, Arab and some Thoroughbred blood was used to create a lighter sport horse type, the Latvian Riding Horse.
