= East Bulgarian =

Bulgarian breed of horse

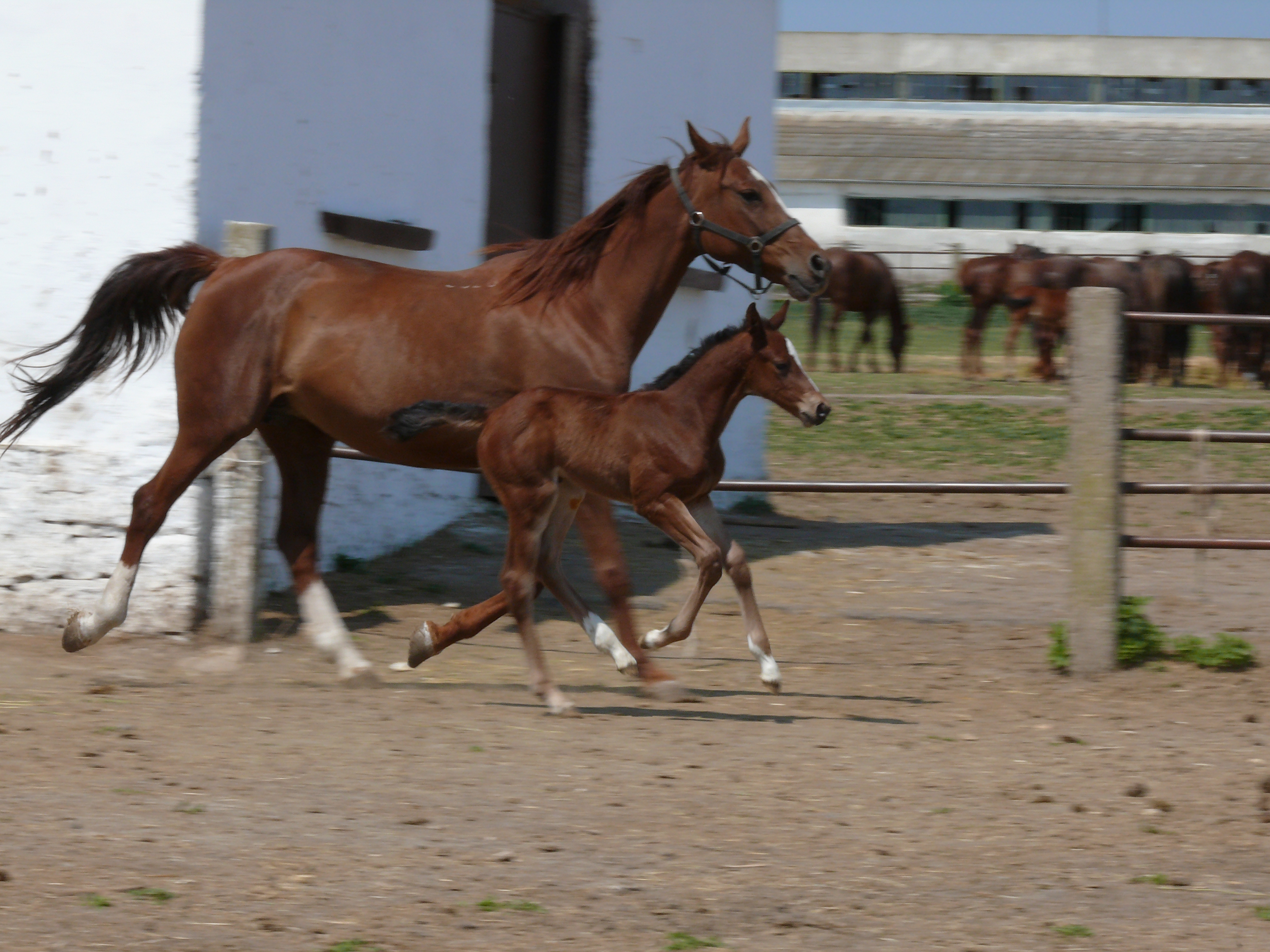
- Mare and foal at Kabiuk stud, near Shumen

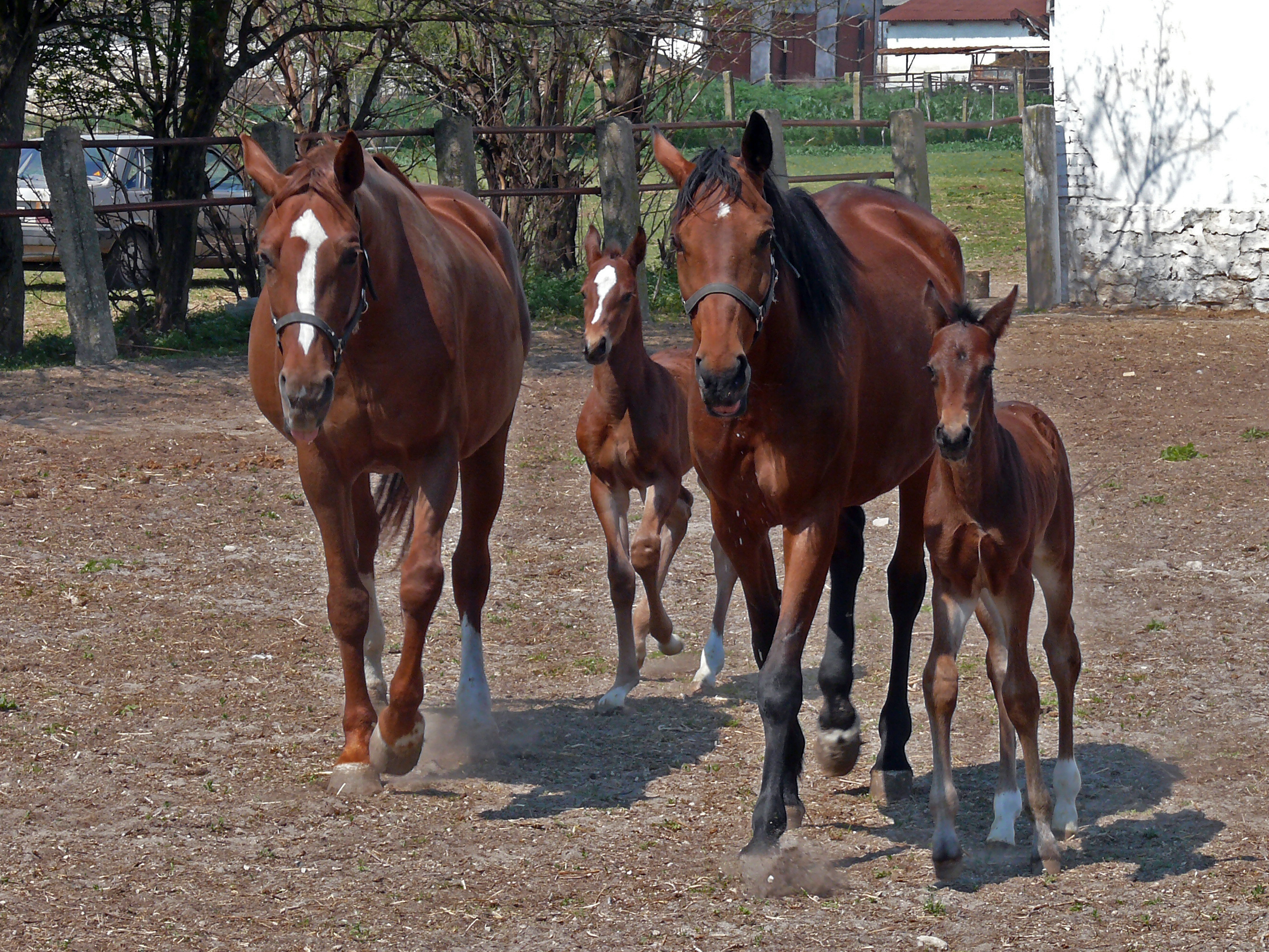
- Mares and foals at Kabiuk stud
- Conservation status: FAO (2007): not listed; DAD-IS (2025): at risk/critical-maintained
- Other names: Bulgarian: Източнобългарски кон; Romanisation: Iztochnobŭlgarski kon; Eastbulgarian
- Country of origin: Bulgaria
- Distribution: nation-wide
- Use: dressage; show-jumping; three-day event; amateur riding; light agricultural draught

Traits
- Weight: Male: average: 550 kg; Female: average: 450 kg
- Height: Male: average: 166.9 cm; Female: average: 162.8 cm
- Colour: dark colours, grey

The East Bulgarian is a Bulgarian breed of warmblood horse. It developed from the warmblood section established in about 1894 at the Kabiuk State Stud and Stallion Depot in Shumen Province, in eastern Bulgaria. A stud-book was started in either 1951 or 1959.

== History ==
The horses were evaluated principally for their performance in racing, both on the flat and over jumps, until about 1990, when the focus changed to performance in the classic disciplines of equestrian sport – dressage, show-jumping and the three-day event. At about this time there was further cross-breeding, now with stallions of Hanoverian, Holsteiner, Selle Français and Trakehner stock.

In 2025 the total population of the breed was reported to be 172, with 117 brood-mares and 55 active stallions; its conservation status was listed in DAD-IS as "at risk/critical-maintained".
