= Uzunyayla =

Turkish breed of horse

- Conservation status: FAO (2007): no data; DAD-IS (2025): unknown
- Other names: Circassian; Çerkes Atlar
- Country of origin: Turkey
- Use: pack animal; riding horse

Traits
- Height: 144–154 cm
- Colour: dark colours or grey

The Uzunyayla or Circassian is a Turkish breed of horse. It originates in, and is named for, the Uzun Yayla plateau in Kayseri Province, in central Anatolia. It is used both as a pack animal and as a riding horse. The coat may be of any of the usual dark colours, or may be grey. The horses usually stand between 144 and 154 cm at the withers.

No population data has ever been reported to DAD-IS for the breed; in 2025 its conservation status was unknown.
