= Li Jiang =

Li Jiang may refer to:

- Li Jiang (politician, born 764), Tang dynasty official
- Li Jiang (politician, born 1950), Chinese politician
- Li Jiang (politician, born 1958), Chinese politician

== See also ==
- Lijiang (disambiguation)
