= Balochi horse =

Breed of horse

- Country of origin: Pakistan and Iran

Traits
- Distinguishing features: Long neck, strong but fine legs, curved ears

The Balochi horse is a breed of horse native mainly to the Balochistan province of Pakistan. It is also found in Sistan and Balochistan province of Iran. They are best recognized by their turned in ears, which resemble those of the Kathiawari horse of India.

== Characteristics ==
The Balochi horse is usually bay, chestnut, or gray. They are light in build and generally have a fine head, long neck, strong but fine legs and ears that curve in so the tips of the ears touch. The Balochi somewhat resembles the Indian Kathiawari breed. They are also thought to be related to the Barb through the Malian breed known as the Beledougou or Banamba. Their average height is 14 hands. Due to diluted bloodlines, horses of pure Balochi lineage are extremely rare today.

== Uses ==
They are used for riding, light draft work, and pulling tangas.
