= Bhutia Horse =

Indian breed of horse

- Conservation status: FAO (2007): not listed; DAD-IS (2025): at risk/endangered
- Other names: Bhotia; Bhutani; Bhutan Pony; Bhote ghoda
- Country of origin: Bhutan; Nepal; India
- Distribution: Bhutan; Nepal; Sikkim; Darjeeling District, India

Traits
- Weight: Male: 345 kg; Female: 260 kg
- Height: Male: 145 cm; Female: 125 cm

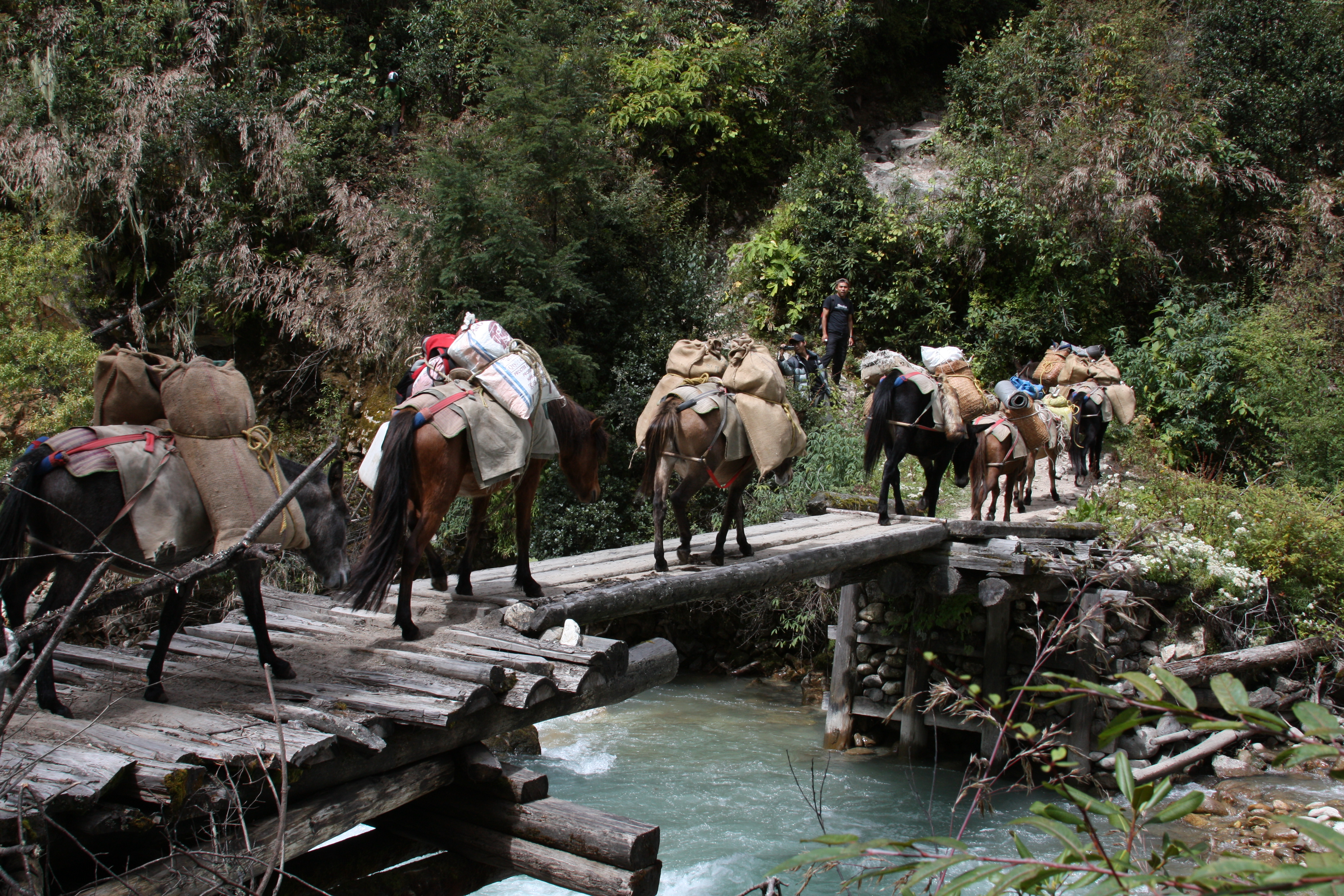
Bhutia horses crossing a bridge, Bhutan

The Bhutia Horse is a breed of small mountain horse distributed in Sikkim and the district of Darjeeling in northern India, in Bhutan and in Nepal. It has some similarity to Mongolian and Tibetan breeds. The usual coat colours are bay and grey.
