= Spanish Trotter =

Spanish breed of horse

- Conservation status: FAO (2007): not listed; DAD-IS (2025): at risk/vulnerable
- Other names: Spanish: Trotador Español; Spanish: Trotador Mallorquín
- Country of origin: Spain
- Distribution: Balearic Islands, principally Mallorca
- Standard: Ministerio de Agricultura, Pesca y Alimentación (page 4, in Spanish)
- Use: trotting racing

Traits
- Height: Male: 170 cm; Female: 160 cm
- Colour: any colour, usually chestnut

The Spanish Trotter, Spanish: Trotador Español, Catalan: Trotó Balear, is the national breed of trotting horse of Spain. It is reared almost exclusively in the Balearic Islands in the Mediterranean, predominantly in the island of Mallorca, but also in Menorca and Ibiza.

== History ==
Trotting races were held in the Balearic Islands from the latter part of the nineteenth century. Trotting horses were bred by putting local Mallorquín and Menorquín mares to imported stallions, usually of French Trotter or Orlov Trotter origin. Some Anglo-Norman mares and stallions were imported from France in about 1920. Breeding is now usually by artificial insemination with semen from French Trotter or American Standardbred stallions.

A breeders' association, the Asociación de Criadores y Propietarios de Caballos Trotadores, was formed in 1970. A stud-book was started in 1980, and an official breed standard was approved in 2011 by the Ministerio de Medio Ambiente y Medio Rural y Marino, as the Spanish ministry of agriculture was then called.

In 2005 there were approximately 15500 horses recorded in the stud-book. In 2023 the total number of the horses in Spain was 7276, including 2459 brood-mares and 129 stallions; of this total, 6803 or 93% were in the Balearic Islands. About 85% of all Spanish Trotters are in Mallorca.

Genetic study has found little recent influence of the Mallorquín and Menorquín on the Spanish Trotter,.despite their contribution to its early development.

== Characteristics ==
The horses are usually chestnut; they may also be bay or roan, or – more rarely – black or grey. Average height at the withers is about 160 cm for mares and 170 cm for stallions and geldings.

== Use ==
The Spanish Trotter is bred only for competitive performance in trotting races. There are three hippodromes in the islands. Races are almost invariably in harness to a sulky, with the horse performing an ordinary diagonal trot; occasionally the horses may instead be raced under saddle. The fastest time recorded for the breed over 1 kilometre is 69.15 seconds. The horses are obedient and manageable, and are also suitable for recreational riding.
