= Xilingol horse =

Breed of horse

- Country of origin: Inner Mongolia

A horse of central Inner Mongolia, the Xilingol is a light horse that is used both for riding and for draft purposes. In the 1960s, it was developed by breeding Russian Thoroughbred, Akhal-Teke, Sanhe, and Chinese Mongolian, after which Kabarda and Don breeding were introduced into the breed.
