= Narym Pony =

Russian breed of horse

Narym
- Conservation status: FAO (2007): endangered
- Country of origin: Russian Federation

The Narym is an endangered Russian breed of small horse.
