= Costa Rican Saddle Horse =

Horse breed

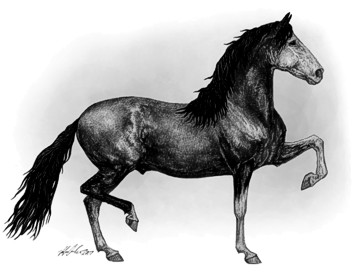
- Costa Rican Saddle Horse Illustration
- Other names: Costa Rican Trotter, Costarricense Paso
- Country of origin: Costa Rica

The Costa Rican Saddle Horse is a horse breed developed in Costa Rica. Since 1850 breeders of the Costa Rican horse have paid more attention to the selection of breeding stock. Because the horse population was small and inbreeding a concern, a few stallions were imported from Spain and Peru. The breed was founded by "Janitzio", foaled in 1955, a loudly marked sabino stallion. In 1972 a breed club (ASCACOPA) was established, and in 1974 the breed registry was initiated.

== Characteristics ==
The minimum height for males is 14.2½ hands (148 centimetres (58 in)) and 14.1½ hands (146 centimetres (57 in)) for females. The head profile is straight or slightly convex. The neck is arched, ample at the base and tapered toward the head. The chest is deep and well muscled, the barrel well developed. The back is short, with the underline being longer. The croup is long, well muscled and slightly rounded. The hair on the mane and tail is fine, and the skin should be fine with short hair. The gait and movements are performed with action and energy, the knees and hocks showing high flexing during the rhythmic and harmonious trot.
