= Unmol =

Breed of horse

- Country of origin: Pakistan

The Unmol is a rare breed of horse from the north-western Punjab, in Pakistan. In 1995, its conservation status was listed by the FAO as "critical" and the breed was described as "nearly extinct". The subsequent (third) edition of the World Watch List for Domestic Animal Diversity, published in 2000, does not mention it; it also was not among the breeds listed in the Global Databank for Animal Genetic Resources in 2007. Unmol horses are or were usually bay or grey. There are, or were, a small number in India.
