= White Horse Ranch (Naper, Nebraska) =

- U.S. National Register of Historic Places
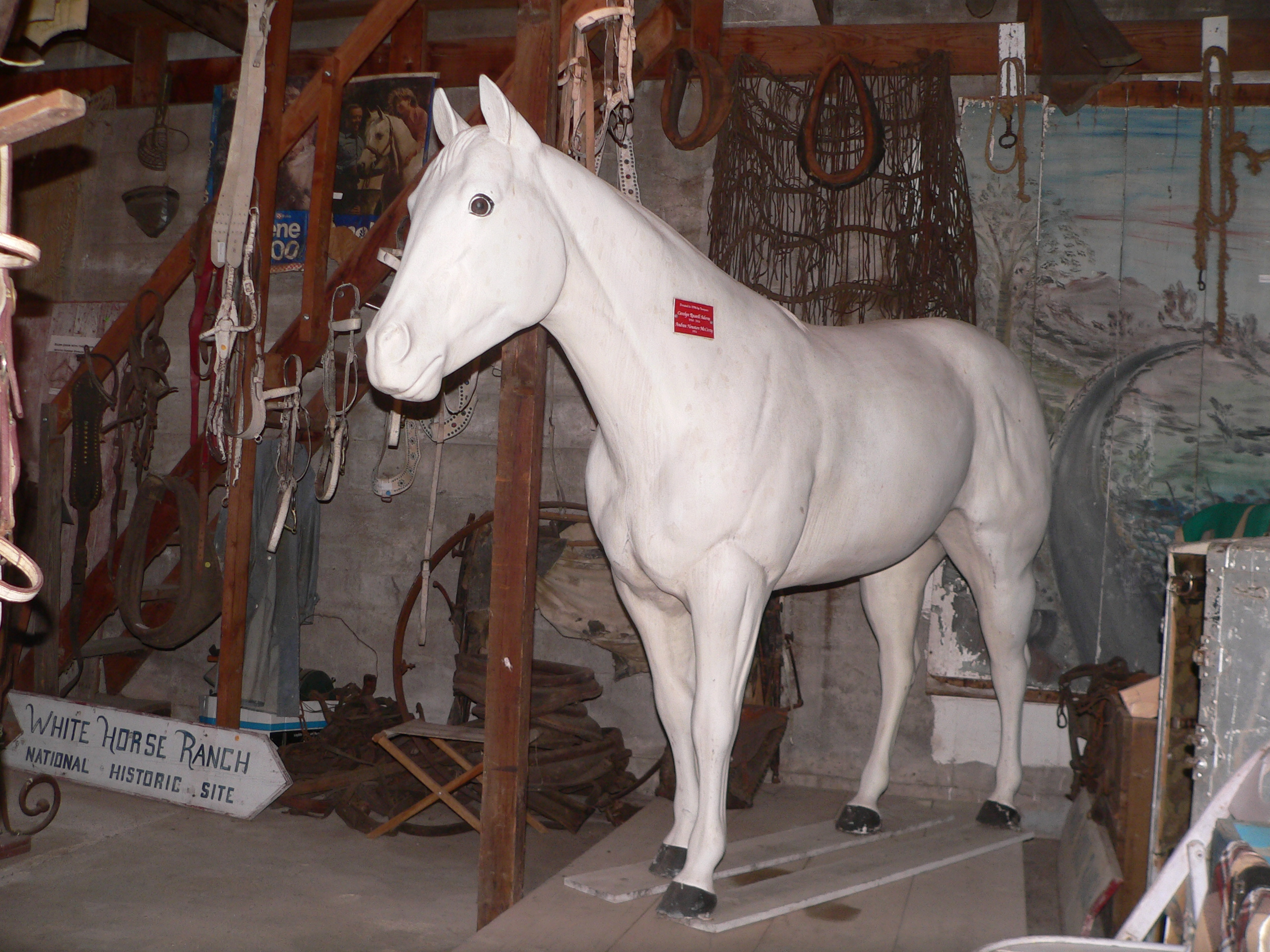

- Location within Nebraska
- Nearest city: Naper, Nebraska
- Coordinates: 42.875095°N 99.059494°W
- Area: 40 acres (16 ha)
- Built: 1936
- NRHP reference No.: 90000984
- Added to NRHP: July 5, 1990

The White Horse Ranch, in Boyd County, Nebraska near Naper, Nebraska was founded in 1936. It was listed on the National Register of Historic Places in 1990. The listing included seven contributing buildings on 40 acres (16 ha).

It is located southeast of Naper between the Keya Paha and Niobrara Rivers.

It is where the American Albino color breed of horses originated, now the American creme and white horse registry.

It was deemed of national significance "as the place of origin of a registered breed of horse, the American Albino or American White. This is apparently the only registered breed of livestock developed exclusively in Nebraska. The date of the founding of the White Horse Ranch, 1936, coincides with the creation of the American Albino registry. Both were the result of the efforts of Caleb or Cal Thompson and his second wife, Ruth, who developed the breed with Cal's brother, Hudson, on their ranches near Merriman between 1917 and 1936. Caleb or Cal Thompson, born at West Point, Nebraska, in 1892, showed a strong early interest in purebred animals and raising registered livestock. In 1917, he and his twin brother, Hudson, purchased "Old King," an outstanding pure white stallion with pink skin but normal eyes, from a doctor in Illinois. The albino, of mixed Arabian and Morgan ancestry, was a splendid showhorse and was used as a stud. Cal began keeping some track of Old King's progeny. In six generations, the Thompson brothers had a pure strain of albino horses without pink eyes. After the death of his wife, Cal Thompson married Ruth Hackenberg in 1934 and they moved from Merriman to Naper in 1936 where they acquired an existing ranch along the Niobrara."

Cal died in 1963 and Ruth in 1990, passing ranch ownership to Ruth's sister Ruby Shumaker. When Ruby died in 2000, her children donated the memorabilia to the Nebraska State Historical Society.
