= Karabair =

Central Asian horse breed

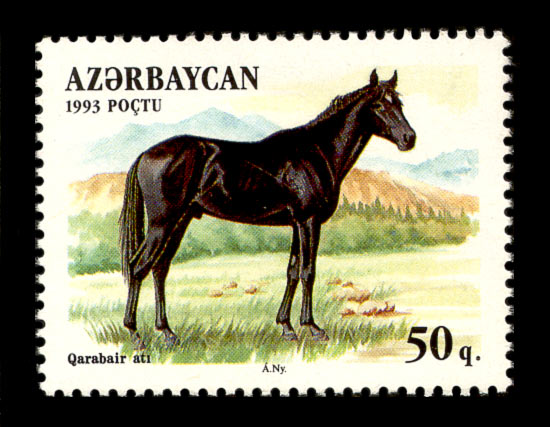
- Karabair on an Azerbaijani stamp
- Conservation status: FAO (2007): not at risk
- Other names: Russian: Karabairskaya; Qarabair
- Country of origin: Kazakhstan; Tajikistan; Uzbekistan
- Distribution: Uzbekistan; northern Tajikistan

Traits
- Height: Male: 156 cm; Female: 151 cm

The Karabair (Uzbek: Qorabayir, Kazakh: Qarabaıyr; Tajik: қаробоҳирӣ, Ķaroboḩirī; Russian: Карабаирская) is a long-established horse breed from Central Asia, and particularly from Uzbekistan and northern Tajikistan. It results from the cross-breeding of desert horses of Arabian or Turkmene type from the south with steppe horses from the north. It is a small, agile and versatile horse that can be used for riding or driving. It is well suited to local horse sports, and especially to the Central Asian game, kokpar. It is also used for meat and milk production; the milk may be made into kumis.

In 2003, a total population of 138,400 Karabair horses were reported by Uzbekistan.
