= Karacabey horse =

Breed of horse

Karacabey
- Conservation status: Extinct
- Country of origin: Turkey

Notes
- Breed became extinct during the late 20th century

The Karacabey horse is a now-extinct horse breed. It was a light riding horse that originated in Turkey.

== Characteristics ==
The Karacabey was a very sound breed with good conformation, showing Arabian influence but with more body mass. They usually stood at 15.1 to 16.1 hands high, and were bay, black, gray, roan, or chestnut. They had a well-proportioned head with a straight profile, set on a slightly arched neck. They had pronounced withers, a wide, deep chest, sloping shoulders, a straight back, and a rounded, muscular croup. Their legs were strong and solid, with good joints and bone structure and well formed, tough hooves. The breed was said to be the only Turkish breed that displayed uniformity of type and consistent transmission of breed characteristics.

== Breed history ==
After the establishment of Turkey as an independent nation, the Turks bred horses they called Karacabey at the Karacabey Stud. They were developed by crossing a Turkish strain of Arabians bred specifically for racing with the native Anadolu breeds.

High quality show jumpers began to be imported from France and Germany, and the Karacabey breed was forgotten in favor of the exotic breeds. Another reason for its decline was competition from motor vehicles; the government decided there was no longer a need for this horse.

The Karacabey Stud also bred a larger horse called the Karacabey-Nonius, now also extinct. The Karacabey-Nonius was bred as a harness horse and show jumper and was produced by crossing the Karacabey to the Nonius breeds. This breed easily jumped over five feet and averaged between 15 and 16 hands. Breeding the Karacabey-Nonius horses ceased entirely in 1970.

The Karacabey Stud ceased all breeding of the Karacabey horse in 1980, and approximately 3,000 horses were sold at auction to the public. In a short time, crossed with other Turkish breeds, the Karacabey virtually disappeared, and today there are no Karacabey horses in Turkey. Ironically, almost as soon as the breed had vanished, the sport horse came to the fore as never before throughout the world, and Turkish officials deeply regretted the loss of this fine breed. Karacabey Stud now breeds the Arabian, Haflinger, and half-bred Halfinger.

== Uses ==
Karacabeys were used as a riding and pack horse, and for light draft and farm work. At one time, Turkey sent a fine Karacabey horse to England as a gift to Queen Elizabeth II of the United Kingdom, and this horse became a champion polo horse. The Karacabey was also a notable jumper.
