= Deliboz =

Azerbaijani breed of horse

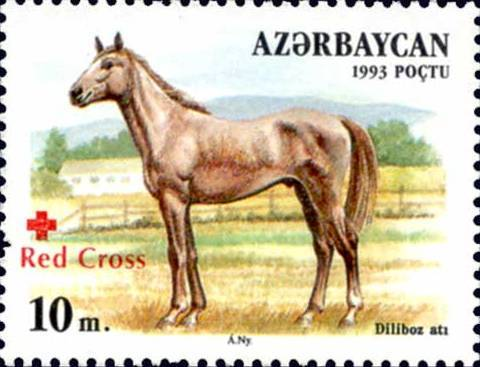
- Other names: Azerbaijani: Diliboz atı; Daliboz; Dilbaz
- Country of origin: Azerbaijan
- Distribution: Azerbaijan
- Use: riding, light harness

Traits
- Height: Male: 137–152 cm; Female: 135–140 cm
- Colour: grey, dark colours

The Deliboz (Azerbaijani: Diliboz atı) is an Azerbaijani breed of light riding horse. It is an ancient breed which underwent selective breeding in the Azerbaijan Soviet Socialist Republic in the twentieth century. It is one of four extant horse breeds in Azerbaijan, the others being the Karabakh, the Guba and the Shirvan. It may also be called Daliboz or Dilbaz.

== History ==
The Deliboz was a traditional local breed of Oriental type, with similarities to Persian and Turkoman horses; it was distributed mainly in the Agstafa, Qazakh and Tovuz rayons of north-western Azerbaijan, and also in neighbouring areas of Armenia and Georgia. In the 1930s and 1940s, under the Soviet régime, a number of horses were selected from the general horse population as typical of the Deliboz type; some of these were crossed with Arab and Karabakh stallions. From the 1950s there was no further introgression from the Karabakh; cross-breeding with Arab and Tersk stallions continued.

The Deliboz is named for the Deliboz stud farm, which ceased to exist during the Second World War.

== See also ==
- Kazakh horse
