= Tersk horse =

Russian breed of light riding horse

Tersk
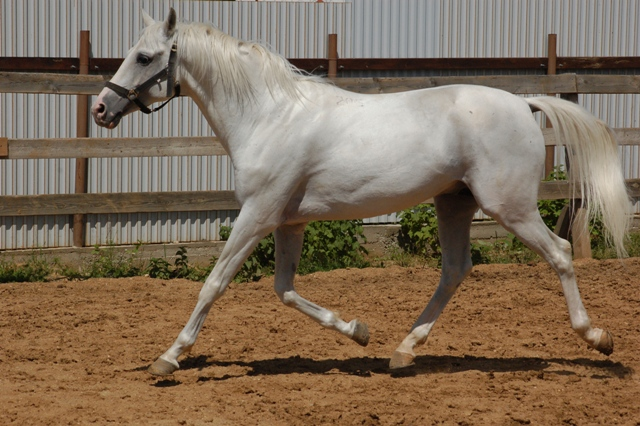
- A stallion
- Conservation status: FAO (2007): endangered
- Other names: Russian: Терская; Terskaya; Tersky
- Country of origin: Russian Federation
- Distribution: Stavropol Krai
- Use: riding horse

Traits
- Height: Male: 160 cm; Female: 157 cm
- Colour: grey, dark colours

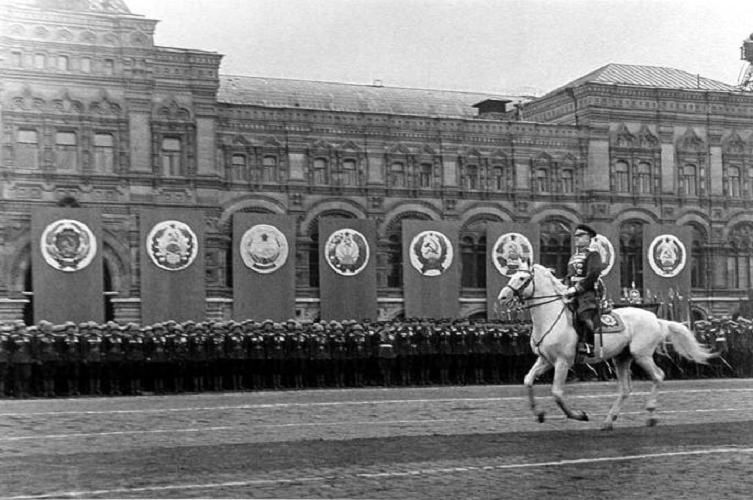
Marshal Georgy Zhukov riding a Tersk horse in the Moscow Victory Parade on 24 June 1945

The Tersk or Tersky is a Russian breed of light riding horse of Arab type. It was bred at the Tersk Stud in Stavropol Krai in the North Caucasus between about 1925 and 1940.

== History ==
The Tersk Stud was established by Semyon Budyonny in 1921 with the aim of re-establishing the horse population of Russia, which was depleted after the events of the Russian Revolution of 1917.

Among the horses brought there in 1925 were two stallions and a few mares of the Ukrainian Strelets breed; this breed, now extinct, was a part-bred Arab with some influence of Orlov Trotter, Don and Kabardin. The two stallions, Tsenitel and Tsilindr, were used on cross-bred mares with Arab, Don, Kabardin and Strelets blood. To create the Tersk breed, the resulting mares were put to Arab stallions, among them Koheilan IV, Marosh, and Nasim. The intent was to create a riding horse of Arab type, but larger and better adapted to extensive management in the taboon system. The breed was officially recognised in 1948.

In 2007 the conservation status of the Tersk in Europe was listed by the Food and Agriculture Organization of the United Nations as "endangered".

== Characteristics ==
The Tersk is similar in conformation to the Arab. It has a light head with straight profile; the shoulders are sloped, the chest broad, the back straight, the croup rounded, and the legs slender but strong. The tail is set on high. The skin is fine, as is the hair of the coat, mane and tail. The coat is often a silvery grey, but may also be bay or chestnut.

== Use ==
The Tersk is well suited to use in eventing, in cross-country riding, in dressage and in show-jumping. It may be used for endurance riding, in which it excels; in one race over 310 km (190 mi), all participating Tersk horses finished the course without difficulty. The horses are often used in circuses.

Tersk stallions have been used for cross-breeding with other breeds such as the Lokai and the Deliboz in the hope of improving them.
