= Guoxia =

Breed of horse

- Country of origin: China

The Guoxia is breed of small horse from the counties of Debao, Jingxi and Tianyang in the prefecture of Baise, in the western part of Guangxi Zhuang Autonomous Region, in southern China. The name means "under fruit tree horse". It is not among the 51 horse breeds reported by China to the DAD-IS database of the FAO.
