= Yili horse =

Horse breed originating in China

Yili
- Country of origin: China

Traits
- Distinguishing features: Small horse breed used for riding, draft, meat and milk. Developed from Russian and Mongolian stock

The Yili is a small horse from the north-western Xinjiang region of China.

== Characteristics ==
They are compact in conformation with a light head and straight profile. The withers are well pronounced and the back is short and strong, though the loin is long. The legs are clean. Yili horses are normally bay, chestnut, black or gray and are an average height of 14 hands high.

== Breed history ==
Yili horses originated around 1900 from Russian breeds (Kazakh Horses) crossed with Mongolian stock from Inner Mongolei. Don, and Don-Thoroughbred crosses as well as Orlov Trotters were used from 1936 on to improve the native horses. In 1963 the decision was made to aim for a draft-type horse.

== Uses ==
Yili horses are used for riding and driving, and also bred for their meat and milk.
