= List of Czech horse breeds =

This is a list of the breeds of horse considered in the Czech Republic to be wholly or partly of Czech origin. Inclusion here does not necessarily imply that a breed is predominantly or exclusively Czech.

Local name(s)	English name if used	Notes	Image
Českomoravský Belgický Kůň	Czech Coldblood; Bohemian Moravian Belgian	Cross-bred from the late nineteenth century from Belgian Draught, Dutch Draught and Noriker stallions x local mares; bay or chestnut, height about 162 cm	
Český Sportovní Pony	Czech Small Riding Horse; Czech Sport Pony	Bred in the twentieth century from Welsh Pony with Arab, Hanoverian, Hutsul and Slovakian Sport Pony; height 137–140 cm	
Český Teplokrevník	Czech Warmblood	Bred from the mid-twentieth century by cross-breeding local mares with Hanoverian, Oldenburger, Oriental, Spanish, Thoroughbred and Trakehner stallions; dark colours, yellow, grey; height about 162 cm	
Klusák	Czech Trotter	From Austrian, German, Hungarian and Russian trotters	
Kůň Kinský	Kinsky; Golden Horse of Bohemia	Bred by the Kinsky family in the Kingdom of Bohemia; sometimes of an unusual golden colour; stud-book from 2005.	
Moravský Teplokrevník	Moravian Warmblood	From Furioso, Gidran, Przedswit and Shagya Arab, endangered	
Slezský Norik	Silesian Noric	From Noriker stock imported in the twentieth century from Austria; meat/riding/draught, 160–164 cm	
Starokladrubský Kůň; Starokladrubský Bělouš; Starokladrubský Vraník	Kladruber; Kladruby		
