= Polish Half-bred =

Polish breed of horse

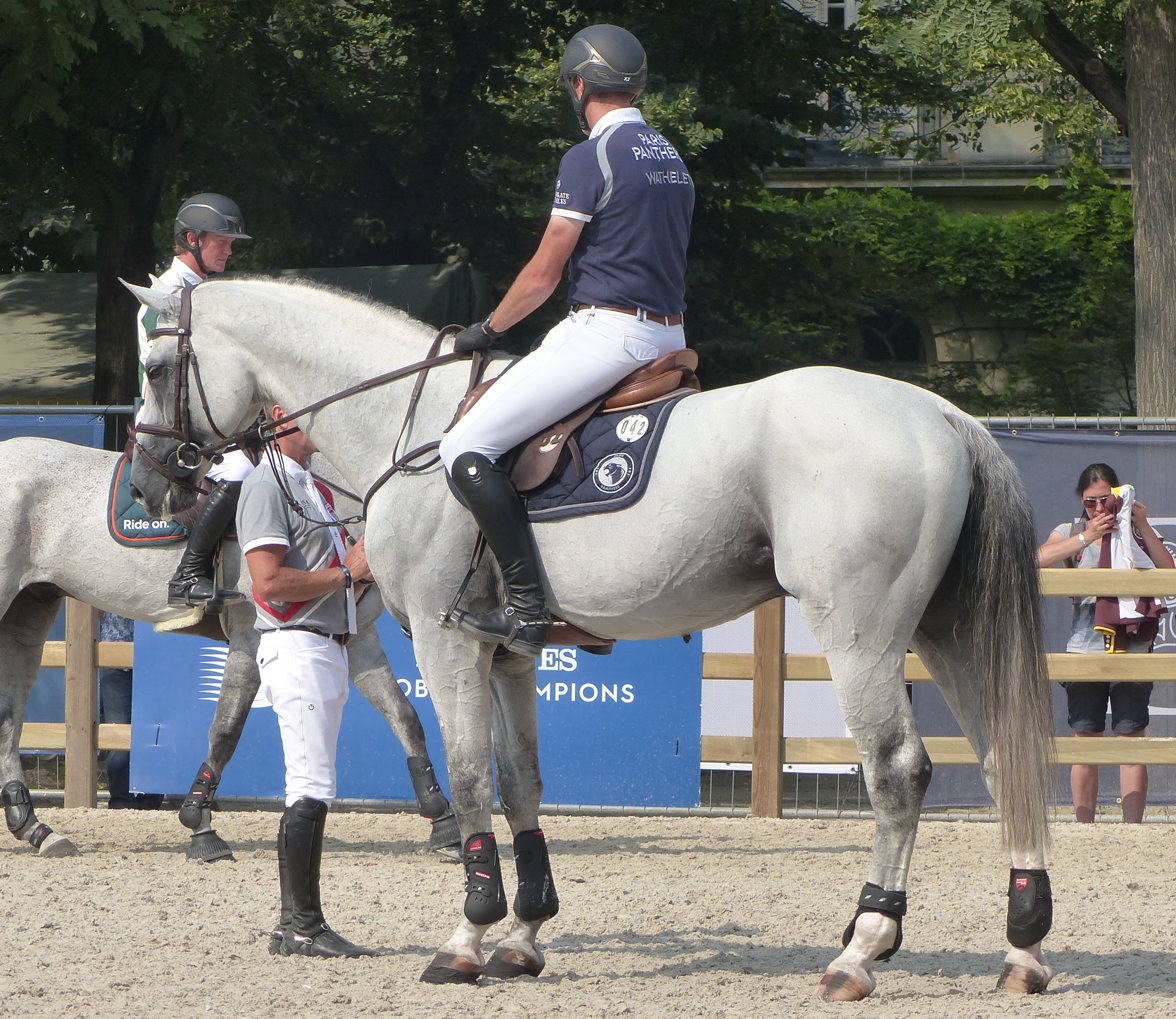
- The stallion Nevados S
- Conservation status: FAO (2007): not at risk
- Other names: Polish Noble Half-bred; Noble; Polski koń szlachetny półkrwi
- Country of origin: Poland
- Distribution: nation-wide
- Use: dressage; show jumping; eventing; recreational riding

Traits
- Height: Male: minimum 160 cm; Female: minimum 158 cm

The Polish Half-bred or Polish Noble Half-bred, Polish: Polski koń szlachetny półkrwi, is a modern Polish breed of warmblood sport horse. Breeding began in the 1960s. Mares of the traditional Polish Malopolski, Wielkopolski and Silesian Warmblood sport horse breeds were crossed with stallions of Western European breeds of established competitive ability. It was bred for competition in dressage, showjumping and eventing, but may also be used for recreational riding or amateur sports. It is one of four warmblood sport horses in Poland.

== History ==
The Polish Half-bred originated in the 1960s, when mares of the traditional Polish Malopolski, Wielkopolski and Silesian Warmblood sport horse breeds were bred to stallions of Western European sport horse breeds of established competitive ability such as the Hanoverian. It was bred mainly to meet the growing demand for horses that would perform well in dressage, showjumping and the three-day event, but also to be used for recreational riding or amateur sports. A stud-book was established in 1977 by the Ministry of Agriculture of the Polish People's Republic; the first volume was published in 1997.

At the end of the 1990s, it was mainly bred at Polish national stud farms, but the increasing liberalization of the market meant that a choice had to be made between using Polish genetic resources and those of stallions of foreign origin.

Between 1990 and 2003, according to the Polish Horse Breeders' Federation, the Polish half-blood was the fastest-growing studbook, with 169 mares and 82 stallions registered in 1990, and 3342 mares and 703 stallions in 2003.

== Characteristics ==
This is a sport horse, whose model is quite variable depending on the crossbreeds used. Like many other European sport horses, it is difficult to characterize. Although their genetic origins are different, the Czech Warmblood and the Polish sport horse are morphologically very similar.

Minimum height at the withers is set at 158 cm for mares 160 cm for males. Horses intended for show jumping should normally stand between 164 cm and 175 cm.

The head has a rectilinear profile. The shoulder is long and sloping. The back is straight, long and muscular. The rump is very muscular and powerful, and the legs are strong. Depending on the sporting discipline, the model may vary: showjumpers are sought after for size and solid legs, dressage horses for harmony and intelligence, and eventers for power and endurance.

=== Selection ===
The selection of Polish sport horses is mainly based on a method called BLUP (Best Linear Unbiased Prediction). The difficulty lies in reconciling the search for sporting performance, model and character adapted to the target market. The selection of breeding stock is particularly controlled, including a constant search for the best known European and world breeding stock, and screening for osteochondritis. A difficulty specific to the Polish cultural context is a tendency to "fetishize" foreign stallions on the basis of their origin. Polish tradition also places great importance on conformation, sometimes leading to the overestimation of horses perceived as particularly elegant.

The use of artificial insemination is crucial to this selection process. A parentage test is compulsory for inseminated mares. Foals are evaluated under dam, then at one and two years of age.

Horses from Polish half-bloods and studbooks registered with the World Breeding Federation for Sport Horses (WBFSH) can enter the Polish Sport Horse Studbook, as can those from Wielkopolski, Malopolski, Silesian, Thoroughbred, Arabian, Anglo-Arabian and foreign horses that meet the studbook's requirements. The breeders' aim is to obtain a high-performance, genetically consolidated horse without the need for continuous imports of genetic resources. As a result, particular attention is paid to the performance of horses already registered in the studbook. Thoroughbred and Arabian stallions are allowed to crossbreed for racing performance. The studbook regulations authorize extensive cross-breeding, with attention paid to the subsequent reproduction of the horses themselves registered.

The inbreeding rate of Polish sport horses is low, probably thanks to the introduction of numerous stallions of foreign breeds.

== Use ==
This horse is bred for competition in showjumping, in dressage and in eventing. Horses unsuitable for high-level competition may be used for recreational riding or amateur sports; some may be used in harness.

The successful showjumper Nevados S is of this breed.
