= List of Polish horse breeds =

This is a list of the breeds of horse considered in Poland to be wholly or partly of Polish origin. Inclusion here does not necessarily imply that a breed is predominantly or exclusively Polish.

Local name(s)	English name if used	Notes	Image
Arden	Polish Ardennes		
Hucuł	Hucul		
Konik polski	Konik		
Kłusak	Polish Trotter		
Małopolski	Malopolski	also Małopolski w starym typie, 'old-type Malopolski'	
Polski koń szlachetny półkrwi; Polski koń sportowy			
Polski koń zimnokrwisty; Zimnokrwiste	Polish Coldblood		
Sokółski			
Sztumski	Sztum		
Traken	Trakehner		
Wielkopolski		also Wielkopolski w starym typie, 'old-type Wielkopolski'	
Śląski	Silesian Warmblood	also Śląski w starym typie, 'old-type Silesian'	
