= Moravian Warmblood =

Czech breed of horse

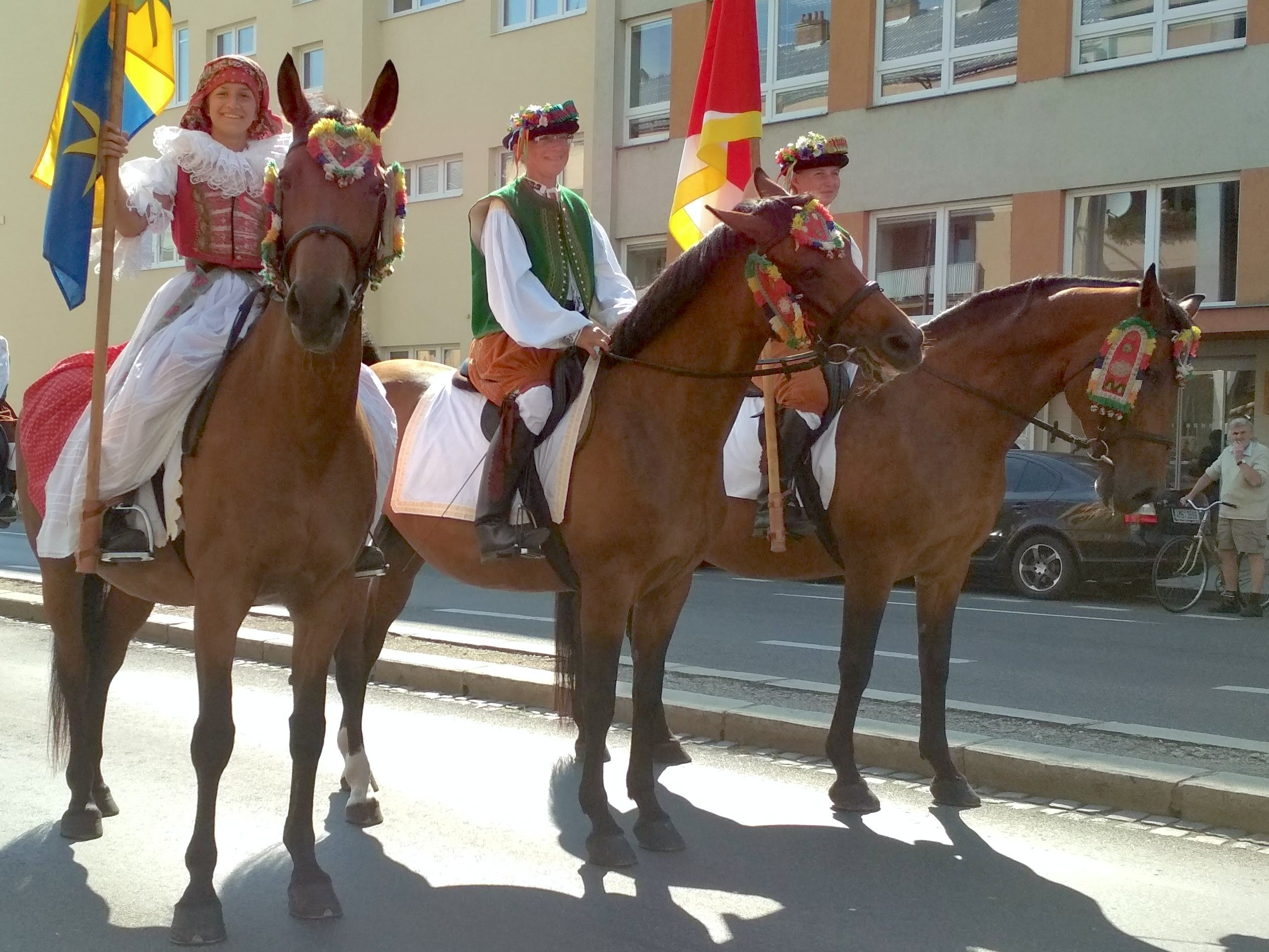
- Conservation status: FAO (2007): not listed; DAD-IS (2025): at risk/critical
- Other names: Czech: Moravský teplokrevník
- Country of origin: Czechoslovakia
- Distribution: Moravia, Czech Republic
- Standard: SCHPMT (in Czech)
- Use: riding; driving

Traits
- Height: Male: 161–167 cm; Female: 159–165 cm

The Moravian Warmblood (Czech: Moravský teplokrevník) is a Czech modern breed of warmblood horse.

== History ==
The Moravian Warmblood derives from the various half-blood horse breeds of the area of the former Austro-Hungarian Empire – the Furioso, the Gidran, the Nonius, the North Star, the Przedswit, the Shagya Arab and the Star of Hanover – as well as the Catalin strain developed from 1927 at the stud of Motešice, now in Slovakia. From 1920 to 1971 these horses constituted a separate population – the Moravian Warmblood – but from 1971 they were registered in the stud-book of the Czech Warmblood, which also held many cross-breeds of Czechoslovak warmblood horses with imported foreign breeds such as the Trakehner.

Efforts to re-establish the Moravian Warmblood as a separate breed began in 1996. A breed society, the Society of Breeders and Friends of the Moravian Warmblood (Czech: Svaz chovatelů a příznivců moravského teplokrevníka), was officially approved by the Czech ministry of agriculture in 2004, and a stud-book was opened in the same year.

A total of 150 mares and 12 stallions had been identified as suitable for inclusion in the new stud-book; of these, 67 mares and 10 stallions were registered in 2004. By 2011 the total registered stock had grown to 280 head, including 167 brood-mares and 22 stallions at stud. In 2025 there were 600 horses in all, with a breeding stock of 36 stallions and 266 mares; the conservation status of the breed was listed as 'at risk/critical'.

In 2018 the Moravian Warmblood was found to be genetically more distant from the Czech Warmblood than was the Kinsky horse, which had had its own stud-book since 2005.

== Characteristics ==
Heights at the withers are in the range 159 to 165 cm for mares and about 161 to 167 cm for stallions and geldings. The coat is usually bay; chestnut, black and grey also occur.

== Use ==
The horses may used both for riding and in harness.
