= Malopolski =

Breed of horse

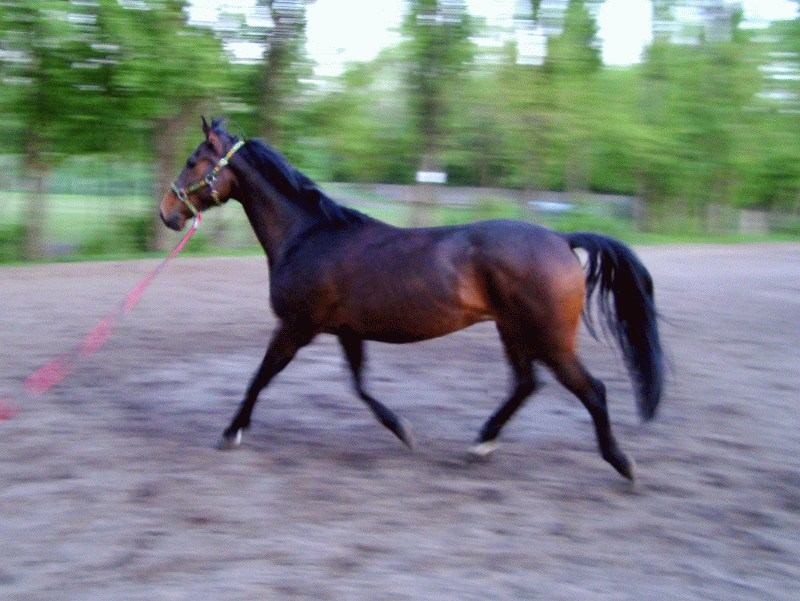
- Malopolski horse
- Other names: Lubelsko-Kielecki; Kraków-Rzeszów
- Country of origin: Poland

The Malopolski (Polish: koń małopolski) is a Polish horse breed developed in the 19th century in Lesser Poland, Polish Małopolska, hence the name. It is versatile breed, used today for light draft and under-saddle work. It was developed mainly from native Polish horses crossed with Thoroughbreds and Arabians, and a 2006 study shows a strong genetic presence of Thoroughbred bloodlines within the breed today. Population numbers have been in decline since the late 20th century, but genetic studies show little danger of inbreeding at this time.

== Breed characteristics ==
Malopolski horses generally stand from 15.3 to 16.2 hands (63 to 66 inches, 160 to 168 cm) high, and may be bay, black, chestnut, gray, or roan, although chestnut and bay are the most common colors. Their head is well proportioned with a straight profile, a neck of good length, withers prominent, the chest wide and deep, and the shoulder sloping and long. The back is long and the croup slightly sloping. The legs are well-muscled and long, with good joints and tough hooves. The breed has much in common with another Polish breed, the Wielkopolski. Malopolski horses are used for riding and light draft work. They are said to perform well in sporting competitions, especially show jumping.

== History ==
The origins of the Malopolski are rooted in native Polish horses of the 15th century, who were crossed with Oriental horses, including Arabians, to form a cross that closely resembled its Oriental ancestors in type. Beginning in the late 19th century, bloodlines from Arabian and Thoroughbred horses were added in the form of purebreds and crossbreds of the Shagya, Gidran, Furioso-North Star and other strains. Nonius blood was also added. Through the introduction of significant amounts of Arabian and Thoroughbred blood, a breed of the Anglo-Arabian type was formed. In 1963, a stud book for the breed was begun, and despite a lack of demand for horses to work in agriculture, Malopolskis rose in popularity as a riding horse. However, beginning in 1999 the breed population has begun to decline, and concerns have been raised about the possibility of inbreeding. However, a 2006 study found that there was little danger of inbreeding within the Malopolski, in part due to the large amount of genetic diversity brought to the breed by the Thoroughbred, which was shown to have a strong genetic influence on the current Malopolski breed.

There are two distinct varieties of the Malopolski. The first is the Sadecki, which was heavily influenced by the Furioso line, and the second is the Dąbrowsko-Tarnowski, heavily influenced by the Gidran line. The breed was also influenced by infusions of various other Arabian and Thoroughbred half-breeds. Today, they are bred at five state studs in Poland: Stubno, Prudnik, Udórz, Walewice, and Janów Podlaski Stud Farm, as well as by individual citizens of southeast and central Poland.
