= Ethiopian horses =

Horse breeds of Ethiopia

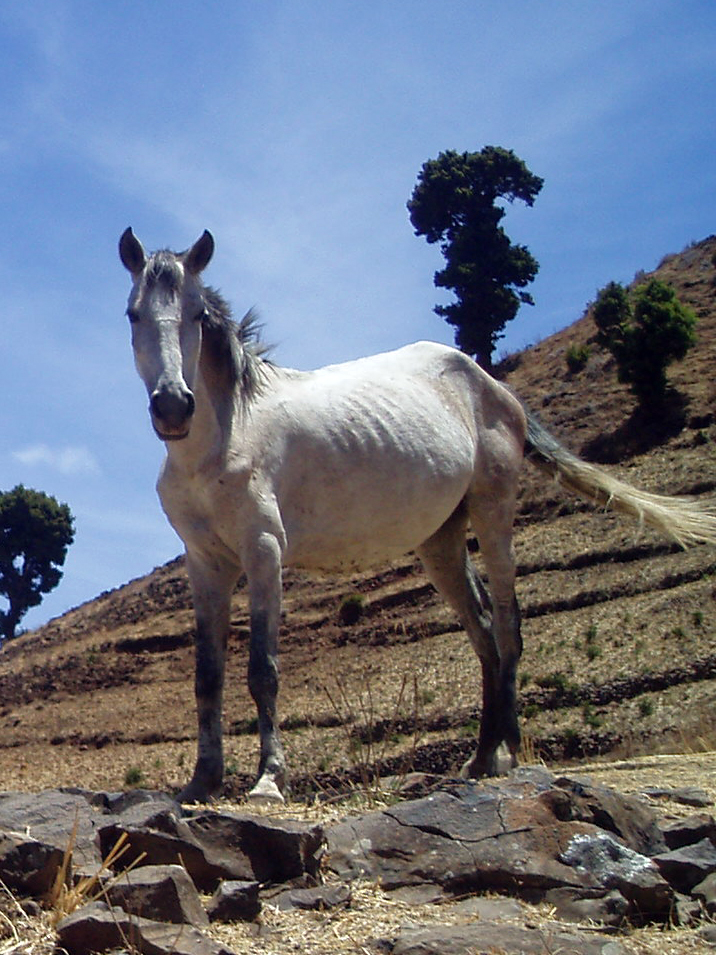
- a Kundudo mare on Kundudo

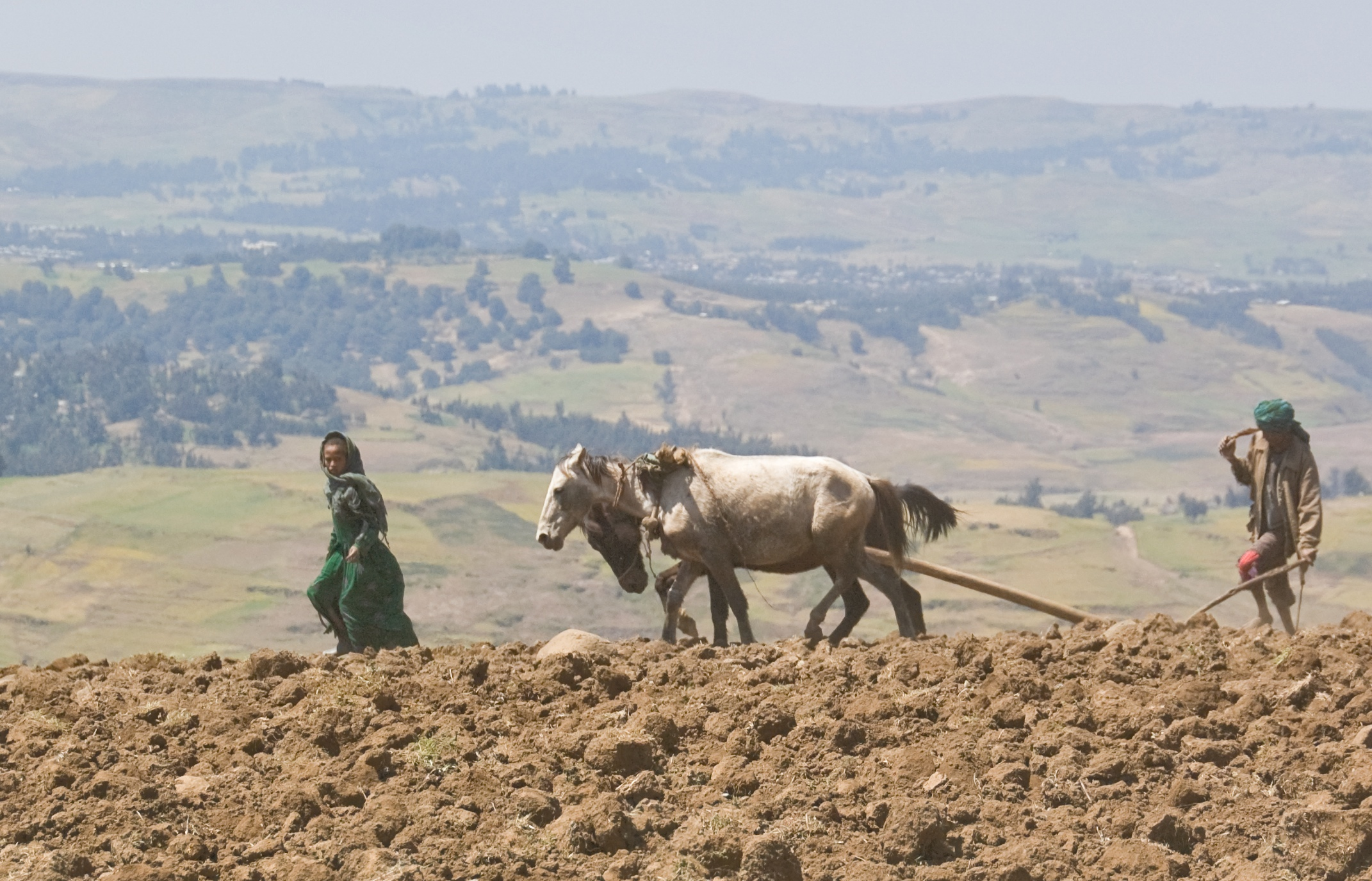
- Ploughing with horses in northern Ethiopia
- Other names: Abyssinian; Bale; Borana; Horro; Kafa; Kundudo; Ogaden; Selale
- Country of origin: Ethiopia
- Distribution: regional
- Use: riding; harness; burden; agricultural work

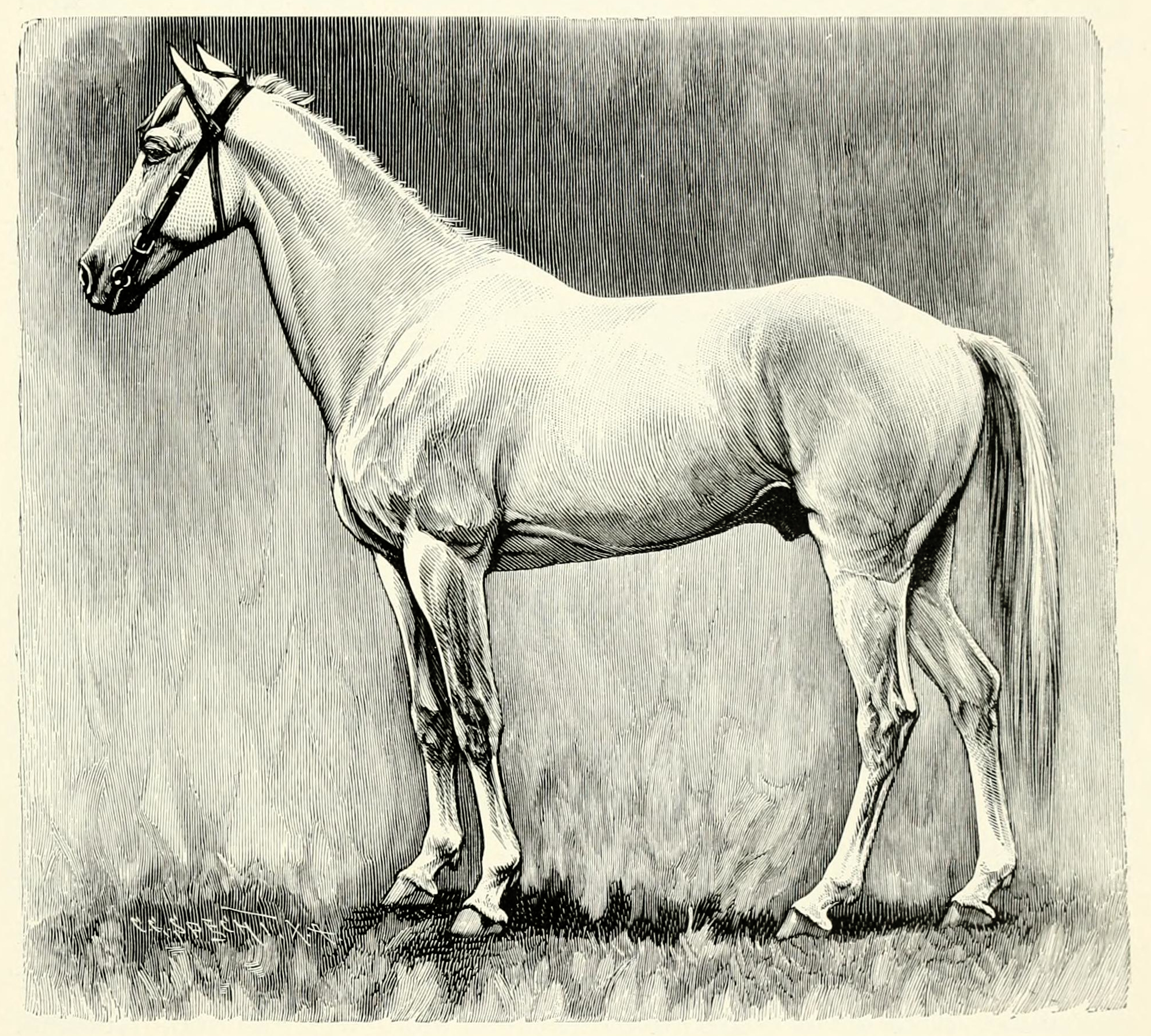
Ethiopian gelding brought to Europe circa 1900 by Henri, Prince d'Orléans; from C.G. Wrangel: Die Rassen des Pferdes, 1909

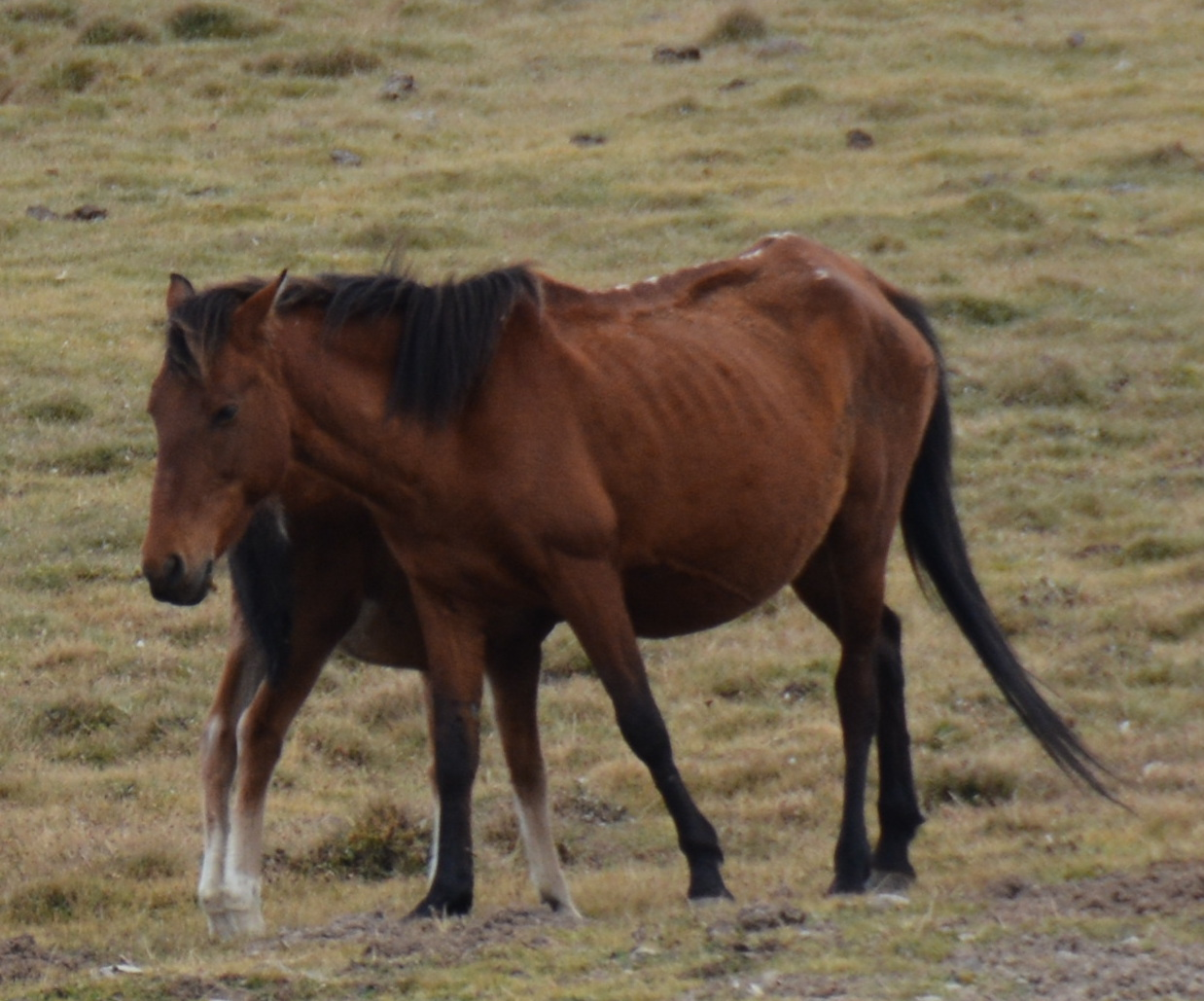
Bale mare and foal on Sanetti Plateau

Ethiopian horses are those breeds or types of horse found in Ethiopia, formerly known as Abyssinia. There are about 2.8 million horses in Ethiopia, more than half the total number in the African continent. In 2016 Ethiopia reported only the Abyssinian breed to DAD-IS. In 2012 the horses of Ethiopia were characterised into eight distinct breeds or types with different regional distributions, including a gravely-endangered feral population, the Kundudo; in 2026 these eight were reported to DAD-IS as recognised breeds.

== History ==
Horses from Ethiopia, formerly known as Abyssinia, were in the past described as a single type, the "Abyssinian Horse" or "Ethiopian Horse", of variable size, colour and conformation. In 1997 two distinct types, the Oromo and Dongola, were described. Morphological research published in 2012 characterised eight distinct breeds or types with different regional distributions.

In 2007 no population data was available to the Food and Agriculture Organization of the United Nations, and no assessment of conservation status was made.

== Characteristics ==
Eight distinct breeds or regional types of horse are found in Ethiopia.

=== Abyssinian ===
The Abyssinian type or breed is found mostly in the northern part of Ethiopia, particularly in the Semien Mountains in the area of Gondar, in the Amhara Region. It is poorly conformed, sway-backed and heavy in the belly. It is much used in agricultural work.

=== Bale ===
The Bale breed or type has poor conformation, with a heavy belly and sway back. It is found in highland areas of the Bale Zone of the Oromia Region, in the southern part of the country.

=== Borana ===
The Borana is a lowland breed kept by the pastoral Borana Oromo people, particularly in the area of the city of Megga in southern Ethiopia. It is of good conformation, is always bay, and is not used for draught work.

=== Horro ===
The Horro or Horo breed is a poorly-conformed agricultural horse from the Horo area of western Oromia Region, in the west of Ethiopia.

=== Kafa ===
The Kafa is a well-conformed and robust breed from the rain-forests of Sheka and Keffa zones of the Southern Nations, Nationalities and Peoples' Region.

=== Kundudo ===
The Kundudo is a gravely-endangered population of feral horses, of unknown origin, from the area of the Kundudo plateau near the city of Harar, in the Misraq Hararghe zone of Oromia.

=== Ogaden ===
The Somali, Ogaden or Wilwal is a well-conformed breed from the Somali Region of Ethiopia (the traditional Ogaden), and is concentrated in the area of the city of Jijiga.

=== Selale ===
The Selale or Oromo is a well-conformed breed of riding horse found in the Selale or Shewa areas of central Ethiopia.

== Use ==
Ethiopia is one of the poorest countries in the world. About three-quarters of all farms are more than one and a half days' walk from an all-weather road. Horses, mules and donkeys are essential to transport and horses are extensively used for transport, traction and agricultural work such as ploughing. Some breeds, in some areas, are used mainly for riding.
