= Mezőhegyes =

- Town
- Coat of arms

- Location within Hungary
- Coordinates: 46.1854°N 20.494°E
- Country: Hungary
- Region: Southern Great Plain
- County: Békés County
- District: Mezőkovácsháza District

Government
  - Mayor: István Tibor Pap (Independent)
  - Deputy mayor: Zoltán Jeszenka (Ind.); Zsolt Mitykó (Ind.)
  - Local council: Eight directly elected representatives

Area
  - Total: 155.5 km^{2} (60.0 sq mi)

Population (2012)
  - Total: 4,994
  - Density: 40/km^{2} (100/sq mi)
- Time zone: UTC+1 (CET)
  - Summer (DST): UTC+2 (CEST)
- Postal code: 5820
- Area code: (+36) 68
- Website: www.mezohegyes.hu

Mezőhegyes is a town in Békés county, in the Southern Great Plain region of south-east Hungary. It is home to the Hungarian State Stud (Hungarian: Mezőhegyesi Állami Ménes), founded in 1784 and famous for its Nonius, Furioso-North Star and Gidran breeds of horse.

== Geography ==
It covers an area of 155.5 km^{2} and has a population of 6355 people (2007).

== History ==
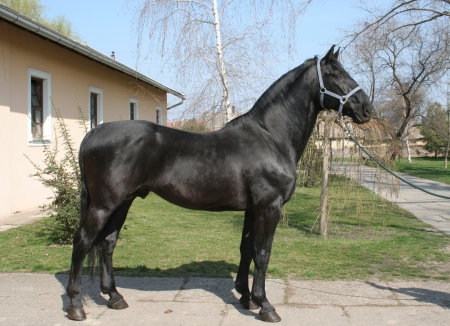
Nonius Mezőhegyes

Mező literally means field, and hegyes means steep.

The Austrian Imperial and Hungarian Royal Apostolic Stud was founded in late 1784 in Mezőhegyes by Emperor Joseph II. As a result, the name of Mezőhegyes became interwoven with the concept of horses. It was here that the Nonius, later on the Gidan, the Furioso and the North Star types of horses and the Mezőhegyes English full blood were bred. The Mezőhegyes English full blood was one of the best horse breeds in Europe.

The roofed riding hall designed by János Hild, which is still in use today, is the oldest roofed riding hall in the country. Riding lessons for both experienced riders and beginners are offered to visitors here. The most significant event here is the Mezőhegyes International Mare and Stallion Competition which is organized each June.

A member school of Harruckern János Public Educational Institute can be found in Mezőhegyes where marketable and qualitative trades are taught based on the area's agrarian traditions: agricultural mechanic, welder and brick-layer, and for girls: women's dressmaker, social worker and guesthouse and rural host, building on equestrian traditions: how to break in horses, blacksmith and tour leader.

== Twin towns – sister cities ==
Mezőhegyes is twinned with:

- Târgu Secuiesc, Romania (1990)
- Mordano, Italy (1990)
- Peregu Mare, Romania (1995)
- San Giorgio di Nogaro, Italy (1998)
- Túrkeve, Hungary (2012)
- Ozun, Romania (2012)
