= Kundudo horse =

African wild horse breed

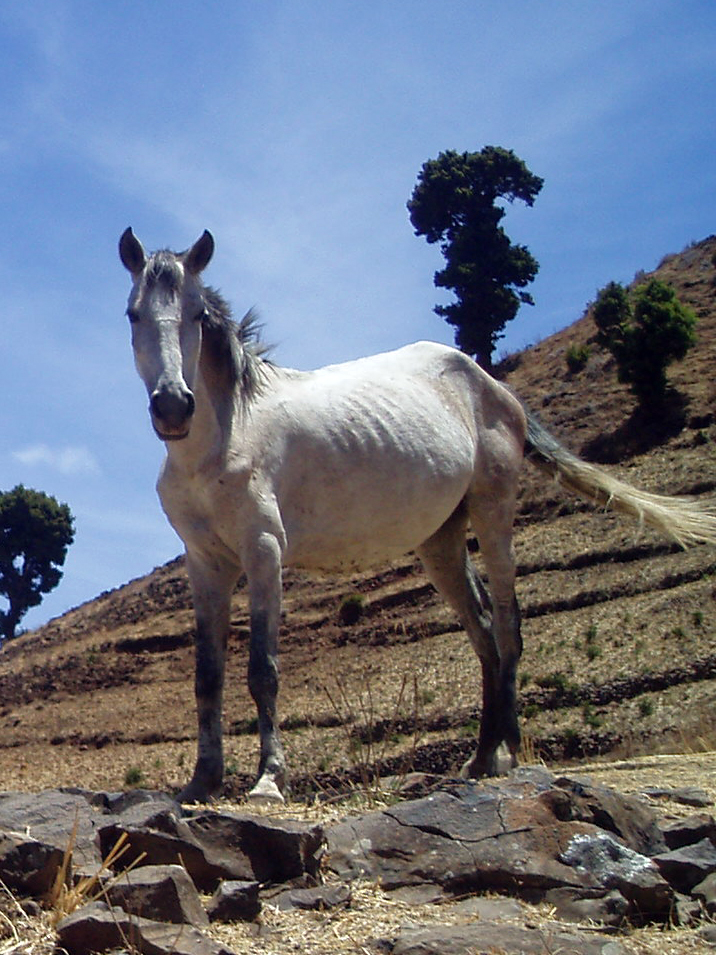
- Grey Kundudo mare
- Country of origin: Ethiopia

The Kundudo horse is a population of wild horse native to Mount Kundudo in eastern Ethiopia. There are very few of them, but have been known to the local population for two centuries. They may have come from a small group of Abyssinian horses lost during military conflicts in the 16th century (see: Ottoman-Ethiopian wars).

They were rediscovered in 2008 during a research expedition. Kundudo horses, with their unattractive morphology and suffering from consanguinity, were occasionally captured and put to ploughing work by a local farmer, who also sold the foals. Ethiopian biodiversity conservation authorities recommended transforming their biotope into a reserve, which would be opened to tourism by 2011. However, due to the decline in numbers between their discovery and an expedition in 2013, these critically endangered horses almost faces extinction. However by 2022 due to an improvement in awareness, they prospered and their status was a total of 30 feral horses on the top of the mountain protected by guards and the number of this horse breed will be expected to rise if protected well.

== History ==
This population of horses owes its name to the biotope in which it has long evolved in the wild, Mount Kundudo. Very little is known about their history, as there are no written sources. Oral tradition, gathered from the oldest local inhabitants, has it that these horses have been known for over 200 years, and that the future emperor Haile Selassie I captured one of them with the help of his uncle, at the age of 10. One oral hypothesis as to the origin of these horses is that their ancestors were military mounts left behind after the Ethiopian-Adal war and later Ottoman–Ethiopian War from 1528 to 1560. It is possible that a small group of 10 to 15 horses survived for decades despite the past presence of lions and cheetahs. However, there is no tangible evidence in favor of an origin theory. The relatively close genetic distance between the Kundudo wild horses and the domesticated Abyssinian horses suggests, however, that the Kundudo may be a sub-population of Abyssinian horses that returned to the wild in the recent past, perhaps during the military events of the 16th century.

The horses of Mount Kundudo were rediscovered at the beginning of the 21st century, when a team led by Ethiopian researcher Effa Delesa Kefena explored the ecozones specific to Ethiopian horses. This research highlighted the difficulties of communicating about Ethiopian horses, which are not even well known locally. On 3 January 2008, the researchers first found a single mare, around 11 years old, with a hooves that had never been groomed and showing no signs of domestication. They took a DNA sample and nicknamed her "Basra ". In October 2010, they counted a total of 18 horses in the mountain area. In 2013, a survey expedition was sent by the Ethiopian Biodiversity Institute, which counted just 11 horses.

There is no stud book. These horses are undergoing a process of re-domestication, as some of them are captured annually by a local farmer, to be put to work.

== Description ==
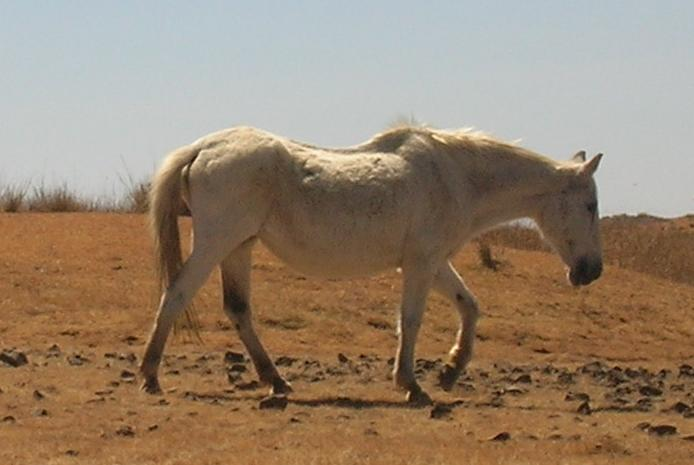
Basra, 11-year-old Kundudo mare

Their morphology is described as faulty, with irregular shapes, short backs with plunging toplines, and paunchy bellies. However, the small number of horses studied means that no consistent morphological data can be deduced.

Kundudo horses are one of eight horse breeds identified in Ethiopia. And, along with the Borana (the Ethiopian breed from which it diverges the most) Kundudo horses are most distant genetically from the other Ethiopian horse breeds. This study attributes one gene cluster to Kundudo alone. The Ethiopian breed closest to Kundudo is the Abyssinian. The population also shows low genetic diversity, the lowest of all Ethiopian horse populations studied. It is likely that these horses have undergone a phenomenon of genetic drift, due to the low number of founder individuals, isolation over a long period of time, and the absence of crossbreeding with horses of external origin. However, their genetic heritage is neither exceptional nor unique compared to other equine populations of this type.

== Usage ==
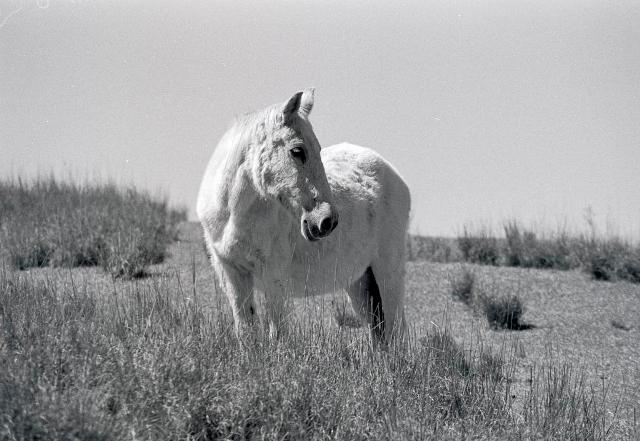
The Basra mare

Although these horses have returned to the wild, and constitute one of Africa's three "wild" horse populations, some of them are regularly captured by a local farmer who puts them to work for harvest time, before releasing them. They are considered to be of little use for this purpose, with little pulling power, and are resistant to the work demanded of them. However, this farmer may have captured or sold some of the foals.

Studies suggest that the grazing area at the top of Mount Kundudo could gradually be turned into a tourist attraction, along the lines of the Namib horse attraction, based on the tourism potential of wild horse watching. The Namib horses are known worldwide, wrongly, as the only "wild" horses in Africa.

== Spread and threat ==
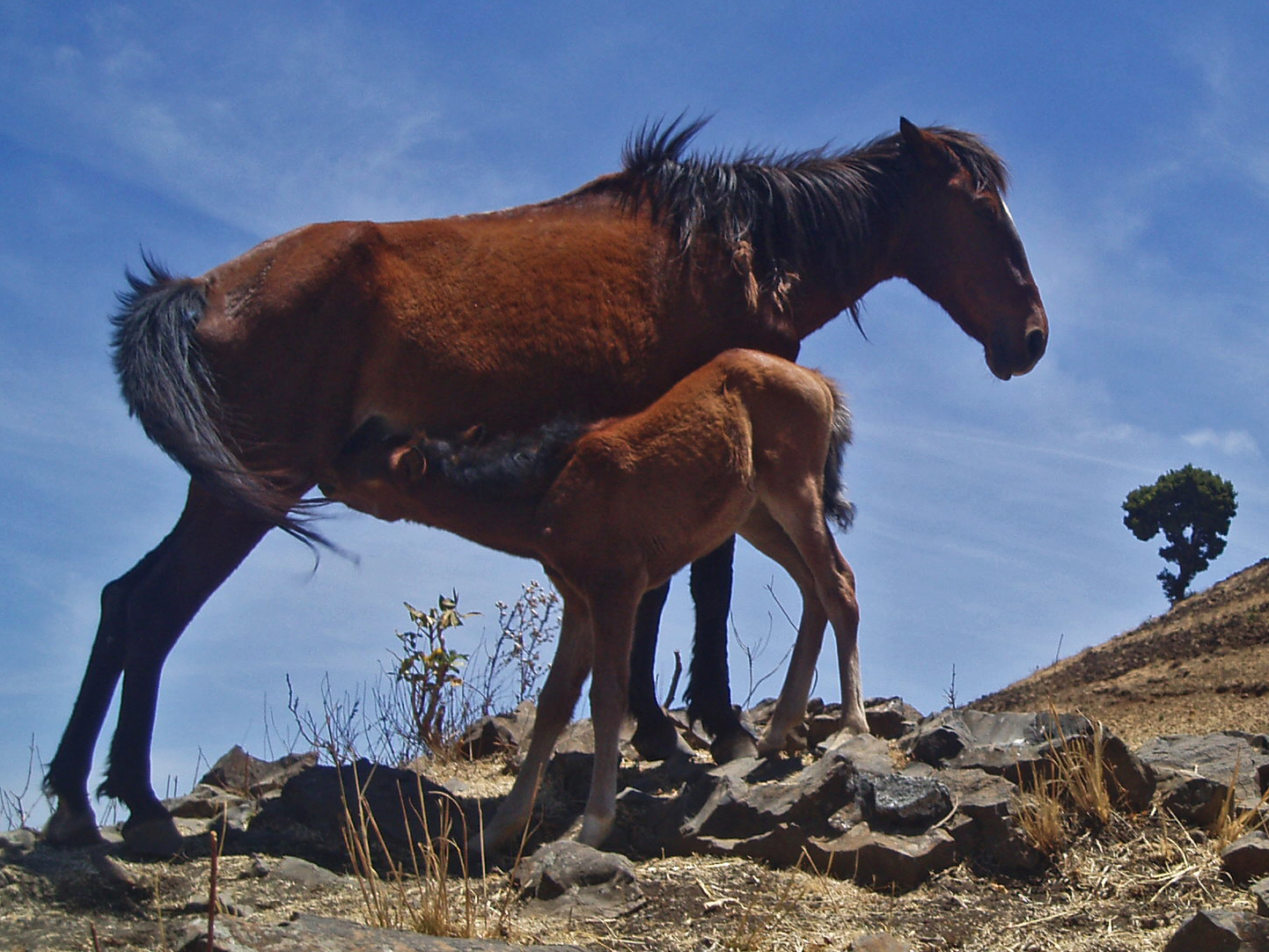
Kundudo mare and foal

The DAD-IS database provides no data on numbers, but the herd is tiny. These horses are essentially local, confined to the Mount Kundudo region of eastern Ethiopia, where they are reputed to be rare. They graze on an area of 13 hectares, and drink from a waterhole at the top of the mountain, which never dries up, even in the hot season. They are the last wild horses in East Africa. They are highly threatened with extinction, due to their rarity, consanguinity, poor breeding practices and the demand for their foals. Since 2011, this animal population has been classified as critically endangered. The Ethiopian Biodiversity Institute has put in place conservation procedures, including the freezing of stallion semen. The breed's importance in terms of its link with Ethiopian history was emphasized.

In 2016, CAB International listed the breed as "potentially extinct", the last recorded population of 11 horses in 2013 being too low to ensure the population's sustainability.

== See also ==
- Ethiopian horses
- List of horse breeds

== Bibliography ==
- Kefena, Effa; Dessie, T. (2011). The Kundido feral horses: Fugitives of the Abyssinian domestic horses. Vol. 25. Ethiopian Society of Animal Production (ESAP).
- Kefena, Effa; Dessie, T.; Han, J.; Kurtu, M. (2012). "Morphological diversities and ecozones of Ethiopian horse populations". Animal Genetic Resources/Ressources Génétiques Animales/Recursos Genéticos Animales. 50. Animal Genetic Resources: 1–12. doi:10.1017/s2078633612000021. hdl:10568/21160. ISSN 2078-6344.
- Kefena, Effa (2012). Equine genetic resources of Ethiopia. Haramaya.
- Mulualem, Tewodros; Molla, Meseret; Getachew, Merkebu (2015). Assessment of livestock genetic resource diversity in Ethiopia: An implication for conservation. Vol. 3. Journal of Genetic and Environmental Resources Conservation.
- Porter, Valerie; Alderson, Lawrence; Hall, Stephen; Sponenberg, Dan (2016). Mason's World Encyclopedia of Livestock Breeds and Breeding (6th ed.). CAB International. ISBN 978-1-84593-466-8. OCLC 948839453.
- Viganò, Marco. Kondudo Feral Horses, essentials. IBREAM.
