= Czech Warmblood =

Czech breed of horse

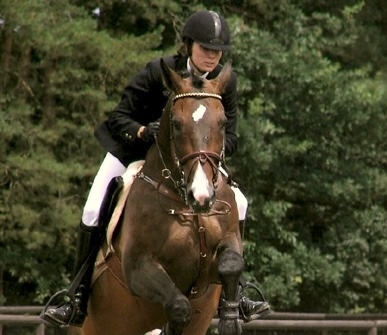
- Conservation status: FAO (2007): not listed; DAD-IS (2023): not at risk
- Other names: Czech: Český teplokrevník
- Country of origin: Czechoslovakia
- Distribution: Czech Republic
- Use: sport horse, principally show-jumping and dressage

Traits
- Weight: 600 kg
- Height: 170–175 cm

The Czech Warmblood (Czech: Český teplokrevník) is a Czech modern breed of warmblood sport horse.

== History ==
The Czech Warmblood was selectively bred in Czechoslovakia from the mid-twentieth century by cross-breeding local mares with stallions of various breeds; these may have included Oriental and Spanish horses, and others of the Furioso, the Hanoverian, the Oldenburger, the Thoroughbred and the Trakehner breeds.

A breed society, the Society of Breeders and Friends of the Czech Warmblood (Czech: Svaz chovatelů českého teplokrevníka), was formed in 1994.

It is the most numerous breed of horse in the Czech Republic, constituting about 23% of the horse population of the country. In 2021 the population was reported as about 18000–20000; the conservation status of the breed was listed as 'not at risk'.

Two other warmblood breeds of the area were formerly assimilated into the Czech Warmblood population: the Moravian Warmblood or Moravský Teplokrevník; and the Kinsky Horse or Kůň Kinský, sometimes also known as the Golden Horse of Bohemia. Separate stud-books for these were established in 2004 and 2005 respectively.

== Characteristics ==
The horses usually stand between 170 and 175 cm at the withers and weigh approximately 600 kg. The most usual coat colours are bay and chestnut; black, grey and dun also occur.

== Use ==
The horses are used principally in show-jumping and in dressage; they are also suitable for recreational riding.
