= Kinsky horse =

Czech breed of sport horse

Kinsky Horse
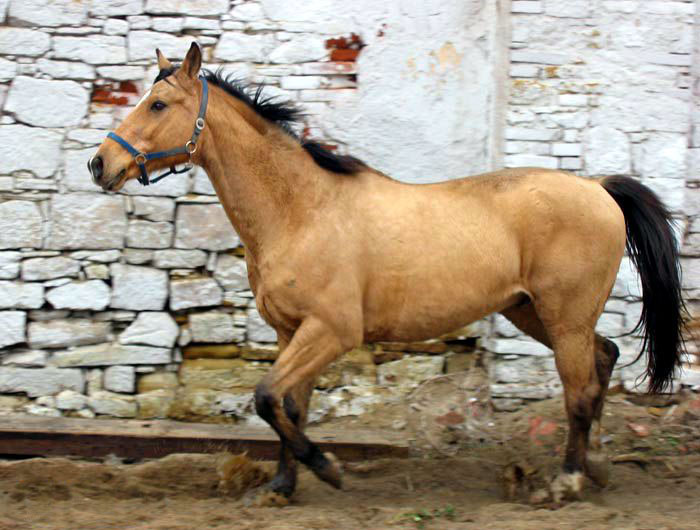
- Conservation status: FAO (2007): not listed; DAD-IS (2020): at risk
- Other names: Czech: Kůň Kinský; Golden Horse of Bohemia
- Country of origin: Czech Republic
- Distribution: Bohemia
- Use: sport; racing

Traits
- Height: 162–175 cm
- Colour: yellow; chestnut; bay

The Kinsky Horse is a Czech breed of warmblood sport horse. It was bred by the Kinsky family in the Kingdom of Bohemia, and is now one of four warmblood sport horse breeds reared in the Czech Republic, the others being the Czech Warmblood, the Slovak Warmblood and the Moravian Warmblood. It was for many years absorbed into the Czech Warmblood; a separate stud-book was established in 2005. It is characterised by an unusual golden-yellow coat, though other colours are also seen.

== History ==
The Kinsky Horse was bred in the nineteenth century by members of the Kinsky family in the Kingdom of Bohemia, and was sometimes known as the Golden Horse of Bohemia. In the twentieth century it was largely absorbed into the Czech Warmblood. A separate stud-book for the breed was established in 2005.

Its conservation status was not listed by the Food and Agriculture Organization of the United Nations in 2007. In 2018 the population reported to DAD-IS was about 600 head, and the conservation status in 2020 was reported as "at risk".

== Characteristics ==
The horses usually stand between 162 and 175 cm at the withers. Many have a coat of a characteristic golden-yellow colour, but others may be bay, chestnut or occasionally black.
