= Wellesley Arabian =

Oriental gray stallion

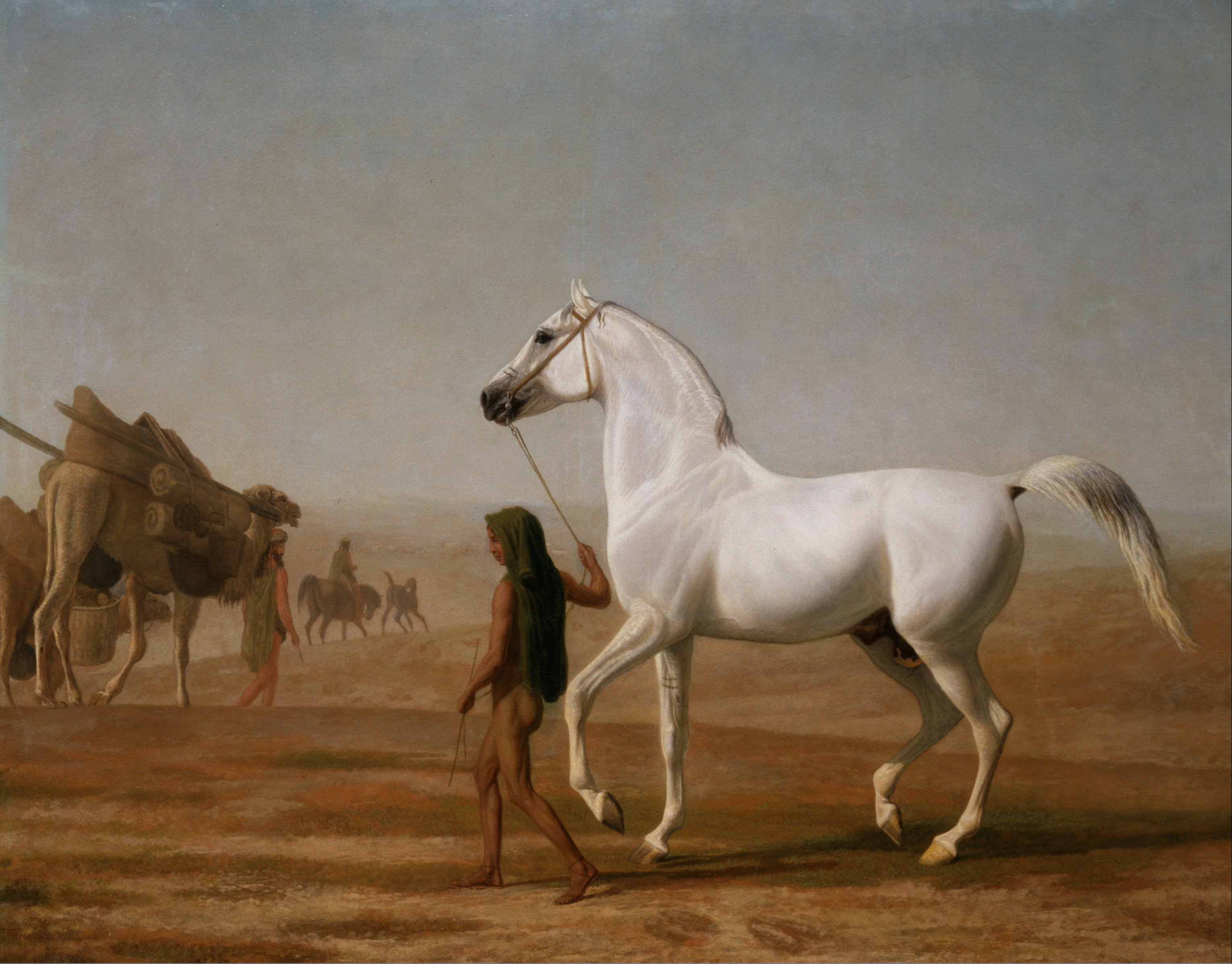
- Jacques-Laurent Agasse, the Wellesley Arabian led through the desert
- Species: Horse
- Breed: Arabian horse
- Sex: Male
- Born: 1803
- Died: 1811
- Height: 157 m (515 ft)

The Wellesley Arabian was a gray stallion of oriental origin, imported to England in the early 19th century by Henry Wellesley. Its origins are controversial, as the Wellesley Arabian may be Persian, Indian, Syrian or from a country on the African continent. One version was imported from India in August 1803 by Henry Wellesley, brother of the Duke of Wellington. This version probably died in England in 1811.

This horse had only a minor influence on the Thoroughbred breed, producing among its few notable descendants the mare Fair Ellen, dam of an Epsom Oaks winner and runner-up in the 1826 Epsom Derby. Wellesley Arabian was also a source of inspiration for Swiss-born painter Jacques-Laurent Agasse. He was featured in several engravings in the early 19th century.

== History ==
According to Roger D. Upton, this horse is also known as The Wellesley Grey Arabian. The Wellesley Arabian is reputed to have originated in an Arabian country outside England, but its exact origin remains unclear, having, according to English veterinarian William Youatt, never been determined.

According to Harry Hieover, although his importer considers him to be an Arabian horse, it may in fact be a Persian horse, as the Persian ambassador had visited England with horses from a stud. Charles James Apperley (1842) and Sir Humphrey Francis De Trafford (1907) support this theory. However, there is no proof of this origin. John Lawrence (History and Delineation of the Horse, 1809) believes it was a Persian or Syrian horse. Other conjectures point to a country "neighboring Arabia".

According to documents relating to Jacques-Laurent Agasse, the Wellesley Arabian was "acquired in Africa and brought back from India" by Henry Wellesley, brother of Arthur Wellesley, Duke of Wellington. Henry Wellesley imported the gray stallion from "the Indies" in 1803, along with another chestnut crossbred. However, according to John Lawrence, only the gray horse attracted attention at the time. Both horses arrived in England in August 1803, on the return from Wellesley's service in the Indies. Wellesley Arabian's large size suggests that he came from a region where equine food was abundant.

An 1829 issue of Sporting Magazine reports on this controversy over his origins, with John Lawrence replying to Captain Gwatkin that Wellesley Arabian was Persian or Syrian, with strong Arabian origins, and not originally from India. The controversy is listed on online genealogical databases, Horsetelex indicating neither origins nor year of birth for Wellesley Arabian, while AllBreedPedigree announced him born in 1803, having as sire an Indian horse born around 1800.

Wellesley Arabian is presumed dead in 1811.

== Description ==
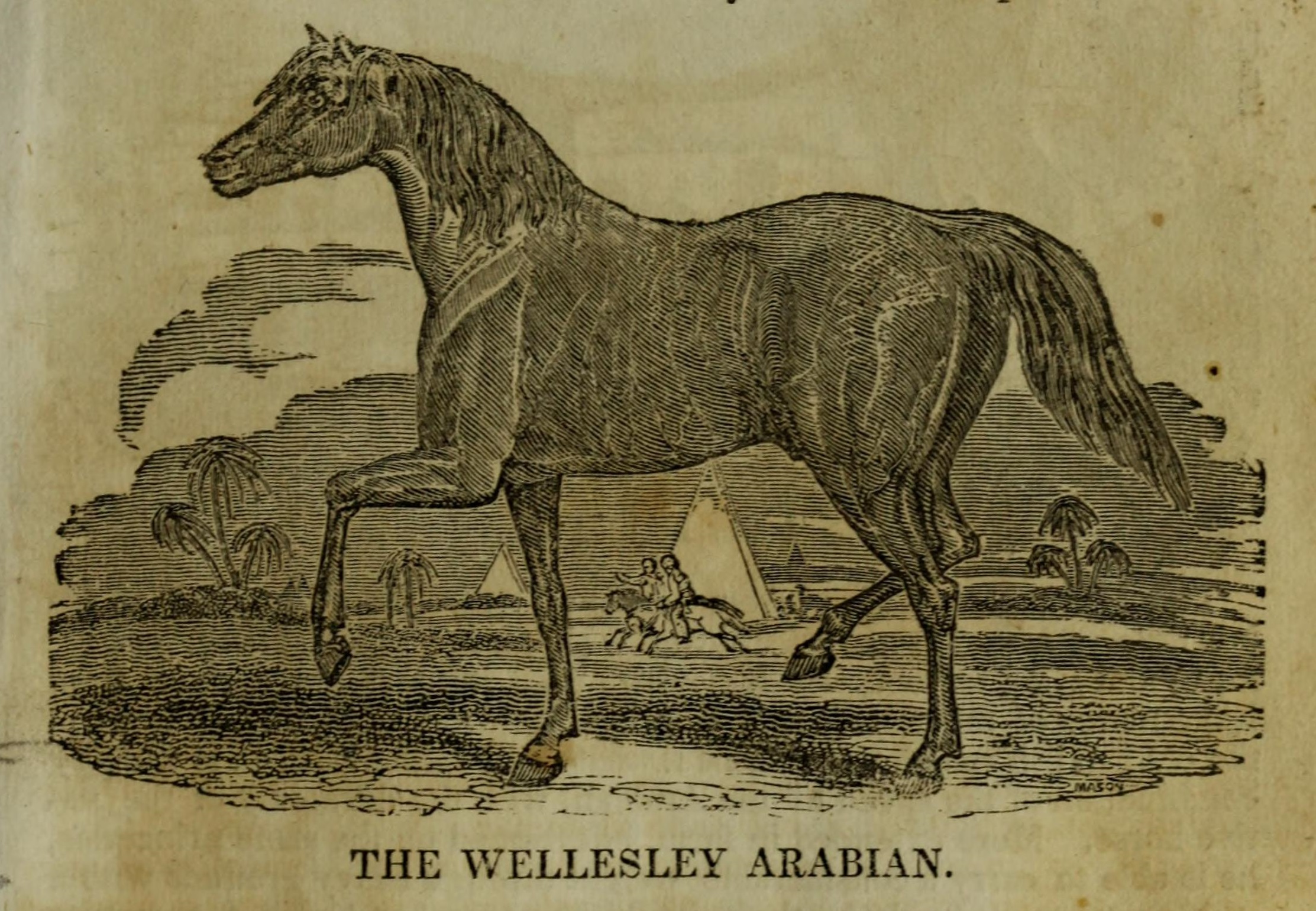
The Wellesley Arabian, from an engraving in an English encyclopedia dated 1831.

Wellesley Arabian was a stallion of oriental origin, but the General Stud Book does not record him as an Arabian Thoroughbred, so he was misrepresented in his day as an Arabian horse. He is neither a Beard nor an Arabian, but rather a typical Thoroughbred hunter of the time. His muzzle profile is not concave. John Scott and Thomas Brown compare it to a European military charger horse, but the limbs and thinness of the skin reveal its oriental origins. Moreover, its hooves are not as fine as those of the usual Arabian horse.

Wearing a gray coat, he is reputed to have been large for his time, standing 15 hands and two inches tall (1.57 m).

== Descent ==
Wellesley Arabian was the last Arabian horse, or supposed to be, to enter racehorse breeding in England. Indeed, no other Arabian horse imported since the late 18th century had influenced the Thoroughbred breed. Wellesley Arabian is therefore an exception to the rule that the Thoroughbred breed has not been influenced by foreign horses.

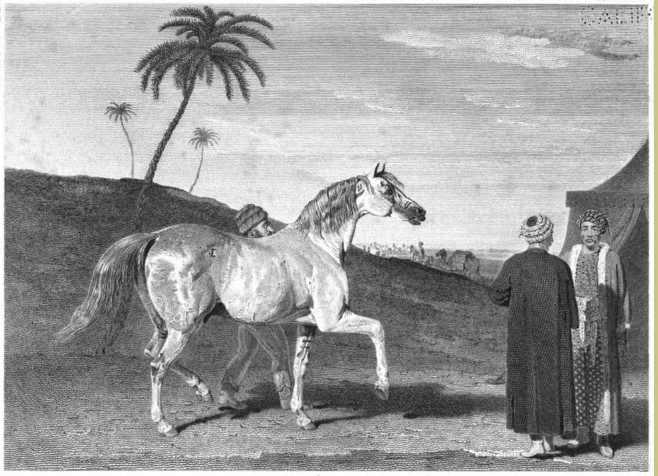
The Wellesley Arabian in the desert, from a reproduction painting published in The Sportsman's Repository, 1831.

A few of his foals were trained as racehorses, but met with too little success to be of note in the history of the Thoroughbred breed. Wellesley Arabian sired Lemon Squeezer, born in 1807 out of Orange Squeezer, a daughter of the stallion Highflyer. Better known was his daughter the mare Fair Ellen, granddaughter through her mother Maria of Highflyer. Through her, the Wellesley Arabian was the grandfather of Lilias, winner of the Epsom Oaks in 1826. Fair Ellen was also the dam of The Exquisite, who finished second in the Derby in 1829. And the dam of Dandizette, born to Mr Walker in 1820, who finished second in the Oaks in 1823. A daughter of Dandizette was the chestnut mare Selim Mare, born to Mr. Sadler in 1822. Dandizette also produced the foal Babel, born in 1823.

== Representations in the arts ==
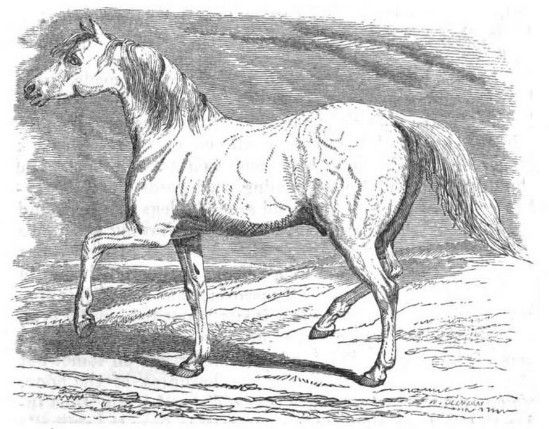
The Wellesley Arabian, from a copy of an engraving published in Horses; their varieties, breeding, and management in health and disease in 1848.

The Wellesley Arabian inspired Swiss-born painter Jacques-Laurent Agasse, who depicted him in one of his major works, Portrait of the Grey Wellesley Arabian with his Owner and Groom in a stable, 1809, one of the few works to be signed. The horse and groom are the subject of a similar painting by Agasse, The Wellesley Arabian, held by a Groom in a Landscape, painted the same year. The painting Portrait of the Grey Wellesley Arabian with his Owner and Groom in a stable was copied by Charles Turner in a fine engraving published in London by Newman on 19 August 1810. Traces of these Agasse paintings have been lost.

An original engraving of this horse was first created in Lawrence's History of the Horse, 1810.

== Bibliography ==
- Apperly, Charles (1842). Nimrod Abroad.
- Baud-Bovy, Daniel (1904). 1766-1849; Töpffer, Massot, Agasse. Le Journal de Genève.
- Messrs. Fores. The Wellesley Arabian. Fores's Sporting Notes and Sketches.
- Goodrich, Charles. "The Wellesley Arabian". A New Family Encyclopedia; Or, Compendium of Universal Knowledge: Comprehending a Plain and Practical View of Those Subjects Most Interesting to Persons, in the Ordinary Professions of Life.
- Scott, John (1831). The Sportsman's Repository: Comprising a Series of Highly Finished Engravings, Representing the Horse and the Dog, in All Their Varieties. Henry G. Bohn. p. 204.
- Skinner, J.S. (1836). The General Stud Book Containing Pedigrees of English Race Horses, from the Earliest Accounts to the Year 1831, Inclusive. London.
- Upton, Roger (1873). Newmarket & Arabia: An Examination of the Descent of Racers and Coursers. Henry S. King.
