= Silesian Warmblood =

Polish breed of horse

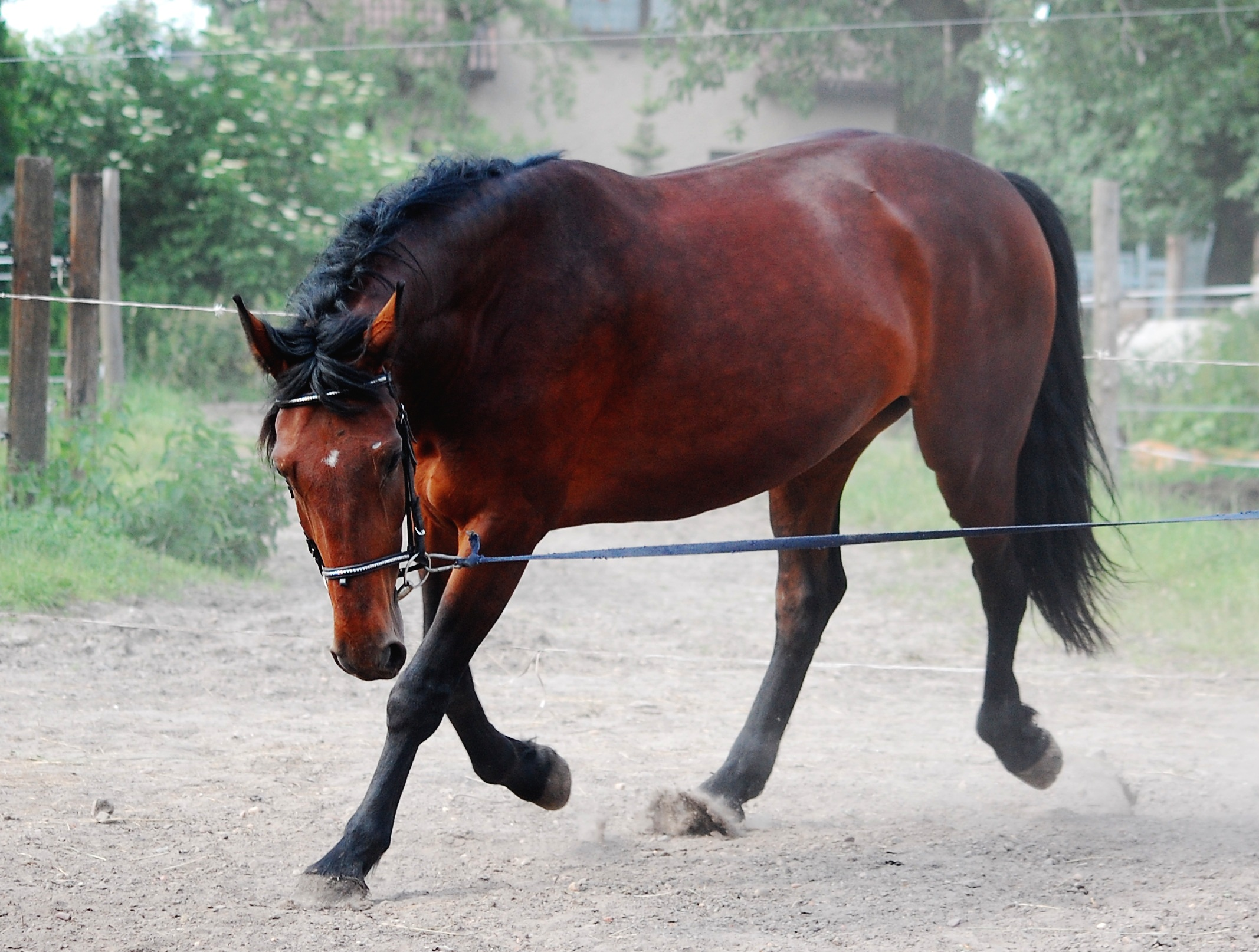
- A mare

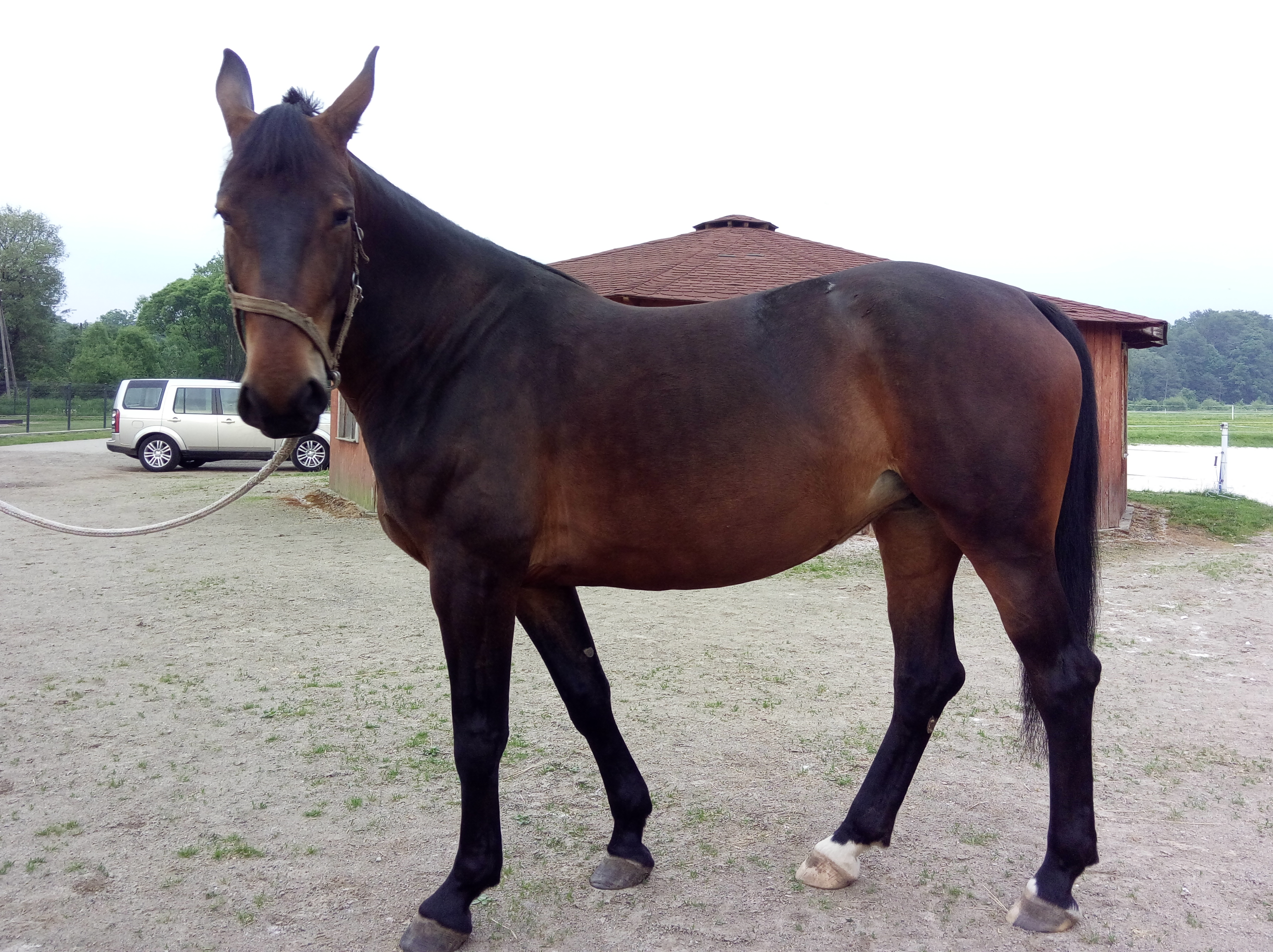
- A four-year-old mare
- Conservation status: FAO (2007): not listed; DAD-IS (2024): at risk/endangered
- Other names: Koń śląski; Schlesisches Warmblut; Silesian; Silesian Horse; Ślaski; Ślůnski Gorkokrew; Ślůnski kůń
- Country of origin: Poland, historic Silesia
- Standard: Polski Związek Hodowców Koni

Traits
- Weight: Male: 650 kg; Female: 600 kg
- Height: Male: 164 cm; Female: 160 cm

The Silesian Warmblood (Polish: Koń śląski; Silesian: Ślůnski Gorkokrew; German: Schlesisches Warmblut) is a Polish breed of warmblood horse. It originates in the historic region of Silesia in south-western Poland and is the heaviest of the Polish warmblood breeds. It has been influenced mainly by the Oldenburger, and to some extent also by the East Friesian, the Hanoverian and the Thoroughbred.

== History ==
The Silesian Warmblood originates in the historic region of Silesia, which lies mostly in the south-west of modern Poland. It is the heaviest of the Polish warmblood breeds, and also one of the largest of all European warmbloods. It derives from cross-breeding – particularly in the years after the Second World War – of the mares of the region with stallions of the Oldenburger of north-western Germany, with some input also from East Friesian, Hanoverian and Thoroughbred stallions.

Records of this type of horse have been kept since the late nineteenth century; the stud-book dates from 1961. In 1993 there were approximately 64000 of the horses, but numbers declined sharply. In 2023 the total number for the old type of the breed was reported at 1400–1900 head, with 1468 brood-mares and 318 stallions at stud. For the new type, the total number was given in 2022 as 4320–4600, with 2567 brood-mares and 270 active stallions. The conservation status of both types was "at risk".

== Characteristics ==
Two types are recognised within the breed, an old and a new; the old type is more heavily built, the new type somewhat lighter and taller. At 3 years old, stallions of the old type stand some 160–170 cm at the withers, mares about 2 cm less; the girth is 190–210 cm, and the cannon-bone circumference some 23–24 cm. The new or racing type is taller and lighter, stallions standing 164–170 cm at the withers and mares about 2 cm less; the girth measures 185–200 cm and the cannon-bone 21.5–23 cm; weights average about 650 kg for stallions and some 600 kg for mares.

== Use ==
It is a large horse with considerable pulling power. It may be used for riding, as a coach horse, or in cross-breeding to conserve coach horse breeds or strains.
