= Wielkopolski =

Breed of horse

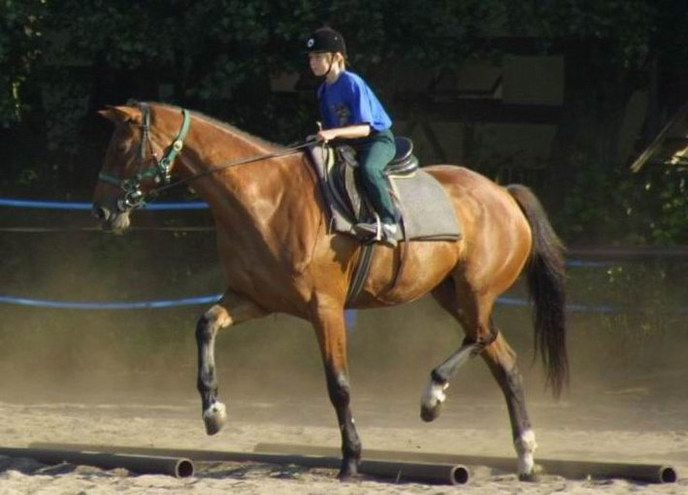
- Country of origin: Poland

The Wielkopolski is a breed of horse that was originated in Central and Western Poland in 1964, and is occasionally known as Mazursko-Poznanski. Its name derives from Wielkopolska ("Great Poland"), a region in west central Poland centred on Poznań.

== History ==
The Wielkopolski was developed by crossing two now extinct Polish breeds, the Pozan and the Mazury, so it is also referred to as the Mazursko-Poznanski. The Pozan or Poznan horse was developed in Poland. This breed was extremely rare, and was bred at the studs at Posadowo, Racot, and Gogolewo. The Pozan was a mixture of Arabian, Thoroughbred, Trakehner, and Hanoverian bloodlines. It was a middleweight farm horse, very versatile, used for riding and agricultural work. The Mazury, also known as the Masuren, was developed in Poland as a riding horse. It mainly stemmed from the Trakehner breed and when crossed with the Pozan went on to develop the Wielkopolski breed. The Mazury was bred at the stud at Liski in the Masuria region. A 1963 Polish postage stamp illustrated a Mazury.

These two breeds formed a base, to which Thoroughbred, Arabian, and Anglo-Arabian blood was further added.

== Breed Characteristics ==
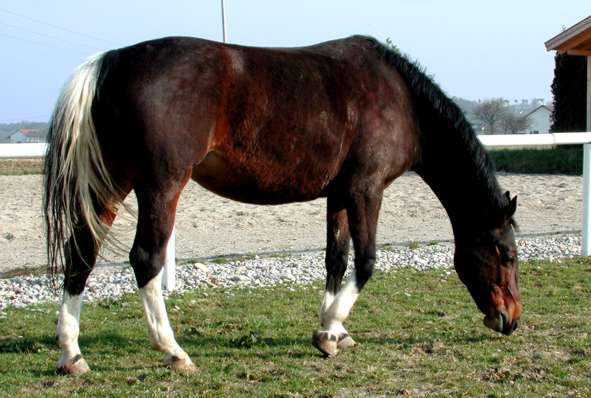

Although not a well-known breed worldwide, it is used as a sport horse because of its temperament, comfortable gaits, and hardiness. Their athleticism allows for use in show jumping and eventing. They are also suitable for dressage.

The breed is bred along two lines. One is lighter, for competitive riding. The other is heavier, and used in harness and as a riding horse.

The Wielkopolski has a fine, small head with a straight profile and lively eyes. This is set into a strong, long neck. The horse has sloping shoulders and a deep and wide chest. It is muscular, compact, and deep in the body, with powerful hindquarters. Their legs are well muscled with long cannons and good, clearly defined joints and tendons. They can be any solid color, and usually stand between 15.2 and 16.2 hands (62 and 66 inches, 157 and 168 cm)

There is also another Polish warmblood breed, the Małopolski, bred in the region of Małopolska ("Little Poland") in the south of the country (around Kraków). These horses are smaller and slightly less suited to showjumping than the Wielkopolski.
