= Nonius horse =

Breed of horse

Nonius
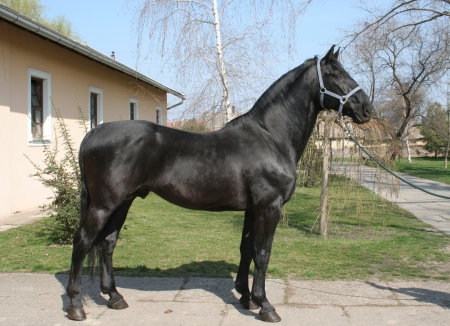
- Black Nonius horse at Mezőhegyes Stud
- Other names: Nóniusz, Hungarian Half-bred
- Country of origin: Hungary

Traits
- Distinguishing features: Dark coat with few white markings, convex facial profile and powerful, high-set neck.

The Nonius (Hungarian: Nóniusz) is a Hungarian horse breed named after its Anglo-Norman foundation sire. Generally dark in color, it is a muscular and heavy-boned breed, similar in type to other light draft and driving horses. The breed was developed at the Imperial Stud at Mezőhegyes, Hungary by careful linebreeding. Originally bred to serve as a light draft and utility horse for Hungary's military, the breed became a useful agricultural horse during the 20th century. The depredations of World War II significantly reduced the Nonius' population, and in the decades after the war, a downturn in the usage of horses in Hungary sent many members of the breed to slaughter. Today the breed is bred by preservationists and is used in agriculture, leisure riding, and competitive driving sports. The largest numbers of Nonius horses are still found at Mezőhegyes, with representatives in other eastern European nations as well.

== Breed characteristics ==
Close linebreeding during the breed's establishment and continued use of a closed studbook have contributed to a recognizable and reliably-transmitted type in the Nonius. The vast majority are black, dark bay or brown, either unmarked or modestly marked with white. Bay individuals are more common among the Nonius horses from Hortobágy National Park. The breed is also known for the heavy but proportional head with a convex profile called either a ram's head or Roman nose. The breed exhibits traits common to heavy-boned driving and light draft horses: powerful and arched high-set neck, broad and muscular back, open but powerful loin, deep and sloping hindquarters. The chest is broad rather than deep, and is usually more shallow than the hindquarters. The hooves and joints are large and the legs are dry. Nonius horses stand between 155 to 165 centimetres (15.1 to 16.1 hands; 61 to 65 in). One of the heaviest warmblood driving horses, the ideal Nonius has a girth measurement of 180–210 cm (71–83 in) and a cannon circumference of 22–24 cm (8.7–9.4 in). Nonius horses are also known for a kind, even temperament and great willingness and capacity for work both in harness and under saddle. In addition they are usually easy keepers with high endurance.

== History ==
Horse-breeding has been an important facet of Hungarian culture since its settlement, due largely to its geographic location and open plains. The Ottoman Conquest, beginning in 1526, saw an influx of eastern, desert-type horses traditionally described as "oriental." These Arabian and Turkish horses were elegant and active, and left their mark on the stock of Hungarian horses. Even after the Ottoman occupation of Hungary ended in 1699, the attachment between Hungary and the Arabian horse remained. During the 18th century, the Hungarian court and aristocracy began to follow the tastes of their western neighbors for Iberian types. The Spanish and Neapolitan imports of the time sparked the creation of the Lipizzaner and Kladruber. These Austrian breeds are known for the features of their Spanish-Neapolitan ancestors: thick, high-set neck, elegant but heavy head, short back and agility. Demand for suitable mounts for the courtiers and aristocrats outstripped the production by private breeders, and so during his reign Joseph II instructed the building of a number of state stud farms.

=== Mezőhegyes State Stud of the Imperial Court ===
The State Stud of the Hungarian Royal and Imperial Court, Mezőhegyes, was founded in 1784 to help meet the demand for horses. At the time, Hungary was home to 1.5 million horses, with the Hungarian cavalry requiring between 10,000 and 15,000 new mounts per year. Different horses fulfilled different roles: courtiers and aristocrats wanted agile, responsive, impressive riding horses for their military endeavors, resilient mounts for hunting on horseback, and elegant carriage horses. Fulfilling these demands led Mezőhegyes to develop several different breeds and strains: the Arab-influenced Gidrán, half-bred Furioso-North Star, and the heavier Nonius.

=== Nonius Senior ===
The Nonius breed owes its name to its foundation sire, though since his male descendants share his name, he is called "Nonius Senior". Nonius was born in 1810 in Calvados, Normandy, France. His sire was named Orion, and, while sources differ on his breeding, he was either a Thoroughbred, a Norfolk Trotter or a combination of the two. Nonius Senior's dam was a Norman mare, making him an Anglo-Norman horse. He was captured from the French Stud at Rosières-aux-Salines during the Napoleonic Wars and brought to Mezőhegyes in 1816.

Even as a foal he was considered ugly. At maturity, the light bay stallion stood about 16.3 hands (67 inches, 170 cm) high. Whether he possessed all of the conformational traits attributed to him – a list that includes most major failings – is hard to know. The qualities of his descendants suggest that he had, at the very least, a very plain head. "Without special beauty in [his] looks," Nonius at first did not serve many mares at Mezőhegyes. It was not until his offspring began to show that they were not so unfortunate as their sire, and additionally possessed uncommon endurance and power, that his popularity began to rise. Going forward, his mates at Mezőhegyes were the fashionable daughters of Spanish-Neapolitan stallions, descended from the Arabian-impressed Hungarian stock.

The Prince of Lobkowitz, who in 1854 became the head of Mezőhegyes, stressed the importance of fixing the type – that is, making the characteristics of a breed of animal genetically homogenous – of the horses. This goal was achieved by linebreeding, though the one season that Nonius Senior served his own daughters was notably unsuccessful: of the 33 foals, 11 died while only 2 were broodmare-quality and 1 was stallion-quality. However, with more experimentation, the Nonius breed emerged as a uniformly heavy but elegant military driving and carting horse. In 1865, Arabian and Thoroughbred stallions were bred to Nonius Senior's female descendants in the hopes of correcting a lack of balance and elegance among the Nonius horses. Nonius Senior stood at stud for 22 years. By the end of his breeding life, he had served mares of Arabian, Lipizzan, Thoroughbred, Spanish and Norman blood. Fifteen of Nonius's sons in turn stood at stud, and 122 of his daughters were used as broodmares.

=== Development and present day ===
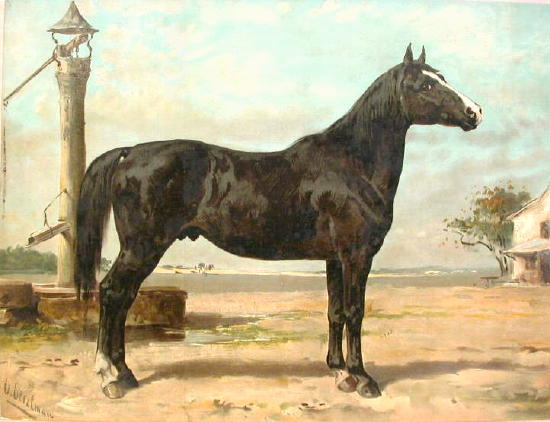
1898 lithograph of a Nonius horse

The roles and popularity of the Nonius breed were affected by periods of social and political upheaval. In 1900 the utilitarian quality and modest appearance of the Nonius horses won the breed the title of "Ideal Horse" at the Paris Exposition Universelle. In 1947 Nonius horses began to be imported. The Mezőhegyes Stud continued to hold the main population of Nonius horses. The stud at Debrecen developed their own strain of the breed, beginning in 1948. This variety, which tended to be heavier than many of the Mezőhegyes Nonius', was called Hortobagyi Nonius or the Hortobagy Landrace. The two sub-types were combined into one breed in 1961.

The military technological advances of World War II displaced the Nonius as a military horse, and it was then directed towards agriculture instead. However, the depredations of the war severely damaged the breed, and by the time the war was over, there were only around 50 mares of the breed left. However, the damage that the property, supplies, and livestock of Mezőhegyes suffered during the war were steadily rebuilt up through the 1960s, and by 1954 there were 120 mares at the Mezőhegyes stud alone. Communist Hungary was not supportive of horseback riding, and in the years between 1947 and 1961, more Hungarian horses were killed for meat than were casualties of the war. Attempts to produce sport-oriented horses from Nonius stock were largely unsuccessful, though during the 1970s combined driving emerged as a popular horse-sport at which the Nonius could excel. In 1989 the Nonius Horse Breeders National Association was formed to protect the purebred Nonius horse. In 1999, UNESCO named the Hortobágy National Park to the World Heritage List (WHL), due in part to its history of livestock breeding, including such breeds as the Nonius horse and Mangalitsa pig. In 2000, the State Stud-Farm Estate of Mezöhegyes was added to the UNESCO Tentative List (which makes it eligible to be nominated for the WHL), due to being a "major centre and organisational example of the highest standard horse-breeding and animal husbandry."

Today estimates put the population of Nonius horses at about 450 mares and 80 stallions. The largest population is found at Mezőhegyes, with other herds in Romania, Bulgaria, and the Serbian province of Vojvodina.

== Uses ==
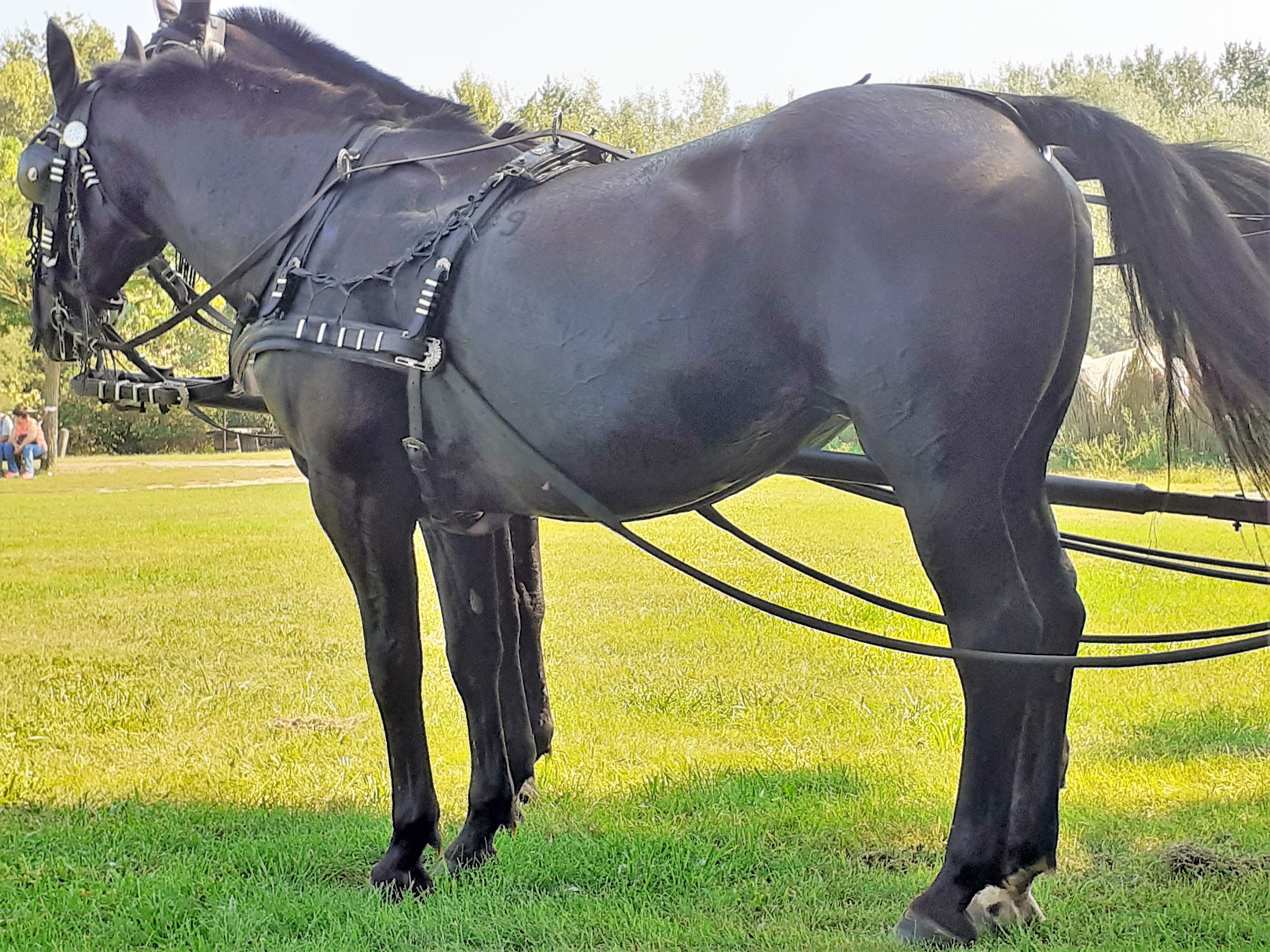
A pair of Nonius horses hitched to a carriage

They are used today in agricultural work, light draft and the sport of combined driving. The popularity of driving sport in Hungary rose sharply during the 1970s and 1980s. The Combined Driving World Championships are held every 2 years, and the most competitive event features teams of four horses. Of the 6 champions named between 1974 and 1984, all but one were Hungarian. The Nonius is slower and less suitable for other riding sports like dressage and show jumping than lighter horses. Smaller members of the breed with larger amounts of Arabian blood in their ancestry are more sought after as riding horses. The heavier horses are still commonly used for draft work, and are well-adapted to the "heavy terrain" of the Great Hungarian Plain.

The Nonius is commonly crossed with Thoroughbreds to create riding horses with improved jumping ability. Members of the breed have also been crossed with Furioso-North Star, Thoroughbred and Shagya Arabian blood to breed warmbloods in Czechoslovakia.
