= Oriental horse =

Ancient breeds of horses developed in the Middle East

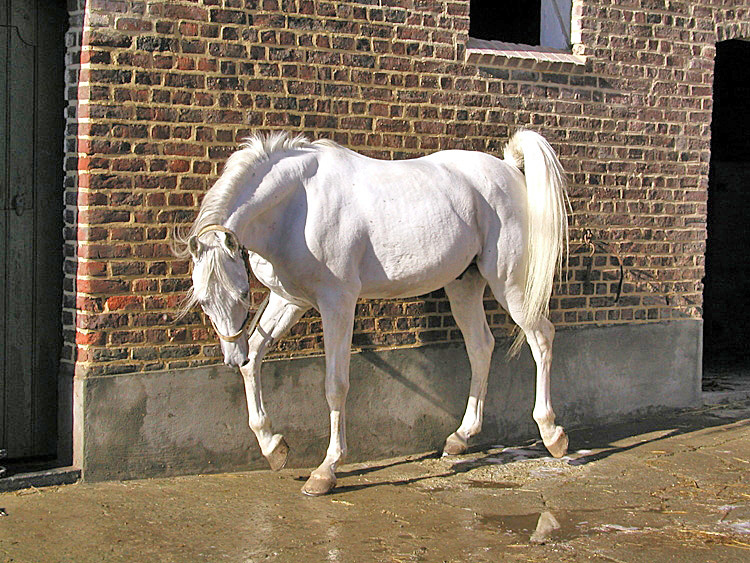
The Arabian horse is one type of Oriental horse

The term oriental horse refers to the ancient breeds of horses developed in the Middle East, such as the Arabian, Akhal-Teke, Barb, and the Turkoman horse. They tend to be thin-skinned, long-legged, slim in build and more physically refined than other types, but with great endurance. Oriental horses, sometimes referred to as hot-blooded breeds, have a level of intelligence that allows them to be athletic, versatile, and learn quickly. They are bred for agility and speed and are generally considered spirited and bold.

== History ==
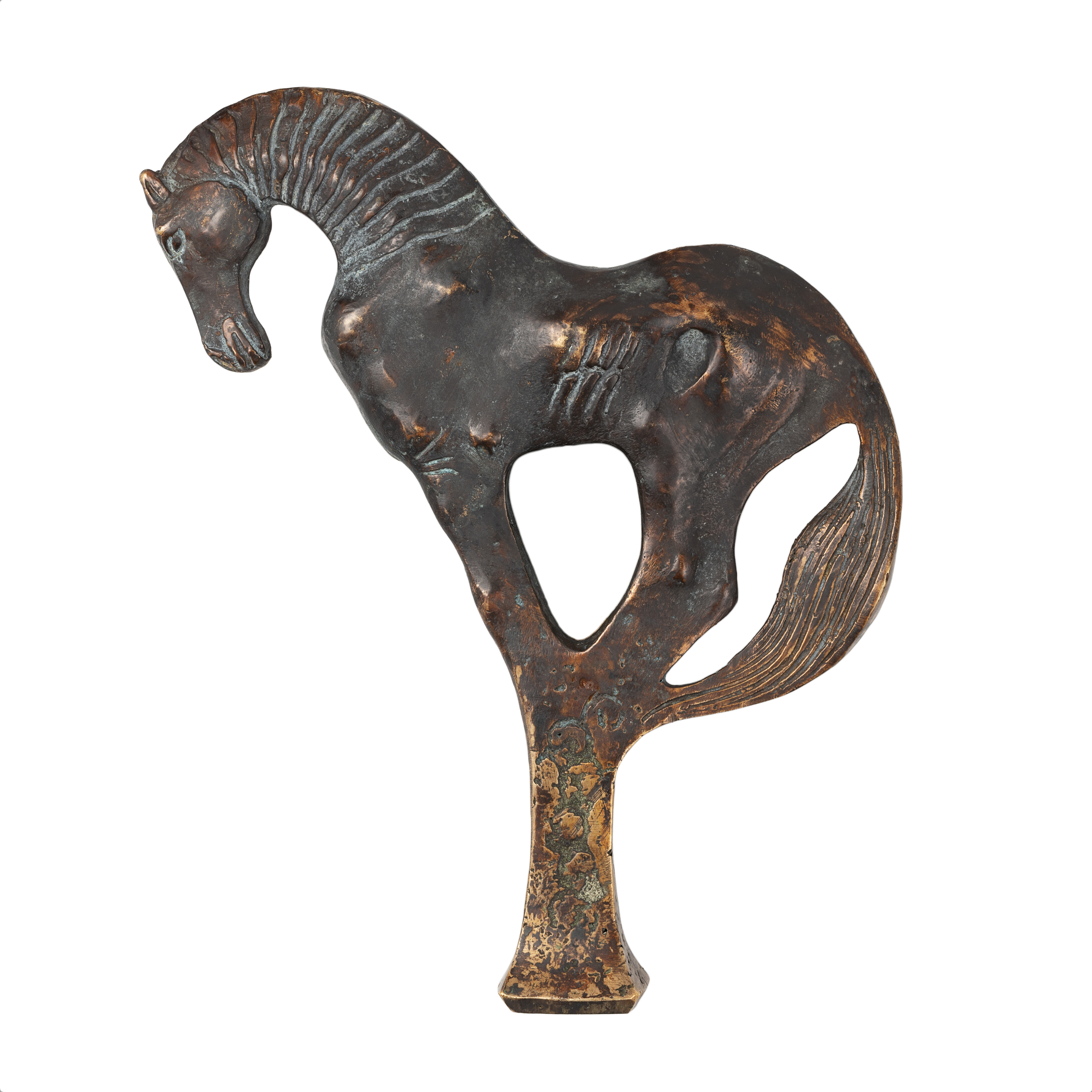
Oriental Horse. Ceremonial bronze finial with standing horse, 4th-1st century BCE.

The ancestral "Oriental" horse was a tall, slim, refined and agile animal that developed in western Asia, well adapted to hot, dry climates, and was further developed into the progenitors of the modern oriental breeds. Original classification of ancient horse phenotypes was originally based on body types and conformation, prior to the availability of DNA for research, and has since been superseded by modern studies. Prior to these developments, the Four Foundations theory suggested the existence of four basic "proto" horses developed with adaptations to their environment prior to domestication by humans. Another theory suggested that the Oriental horse was a separate species or subspecies (once proposed as Equus agilis though modern taxonomy disputes this ever was a true subspecies). However, modern genetic evidence now points at a single domestication event for a limited number of stallions, combined with repeated restocking of wild mares into domesticated herds, making the later divergence of body types a landrace or selective breeding adaption.

Ancient material culture also preserves images of elite horses associated with the wider eastern Eurasian equestrian world. The ceremonial bronze horse finial illustrated in this article is commonly called the "Heavenly Horse" (Tianma) and is often identified in Western scholarship with the Ferghana horse. Ospanov’s 2026 study attributes the object to the Greco-Bactrian/Central Asian artistic sphere and interprets it as reflecting Central Asian horse-breeding culture and the exchange of prestige-horse imagery along the Silk Road.

Over the centuries, European breeders imported oriental horses from the Middle East and Northern Africa for breeding when they wanted to incorporate characteristic traits into their best horse racing and light cavalry horses. Breeders' use of Arabians, and possibly Barb and Turkoman horses, was instrumental in developing the Thoroughbred breed. Analysis of mitochondrial DNA (mtDNA) in the Andalusian horse shows a clear link to an influx of Barb breeding. Nearly all other breeds of light and warmblood horses have some oriental ancestry, usually through the Arabian.

== See also ==
- Domestication of the horse
- Wellesley Arabian

== Sources ==
- Bennett, Deb (1998). Conquerors: The Roots of New World Horsemanship (First ed.). Solvang, CA: Amigo Publications, Inc. ISBN 978-0-9658533-0-9.
- DeFilippis, Chris (2006). The Everything Horse Care Book. Avon, MA: Adams Media. ISBN 978-1-59337-530-0.
- Henry, Marguerite (1967). All About Horses. New York, NY: Random House. ASIN B000H1MRGW.
