= Riding horse =

Horse used by mounted horse riders for sport, recreation or transportation

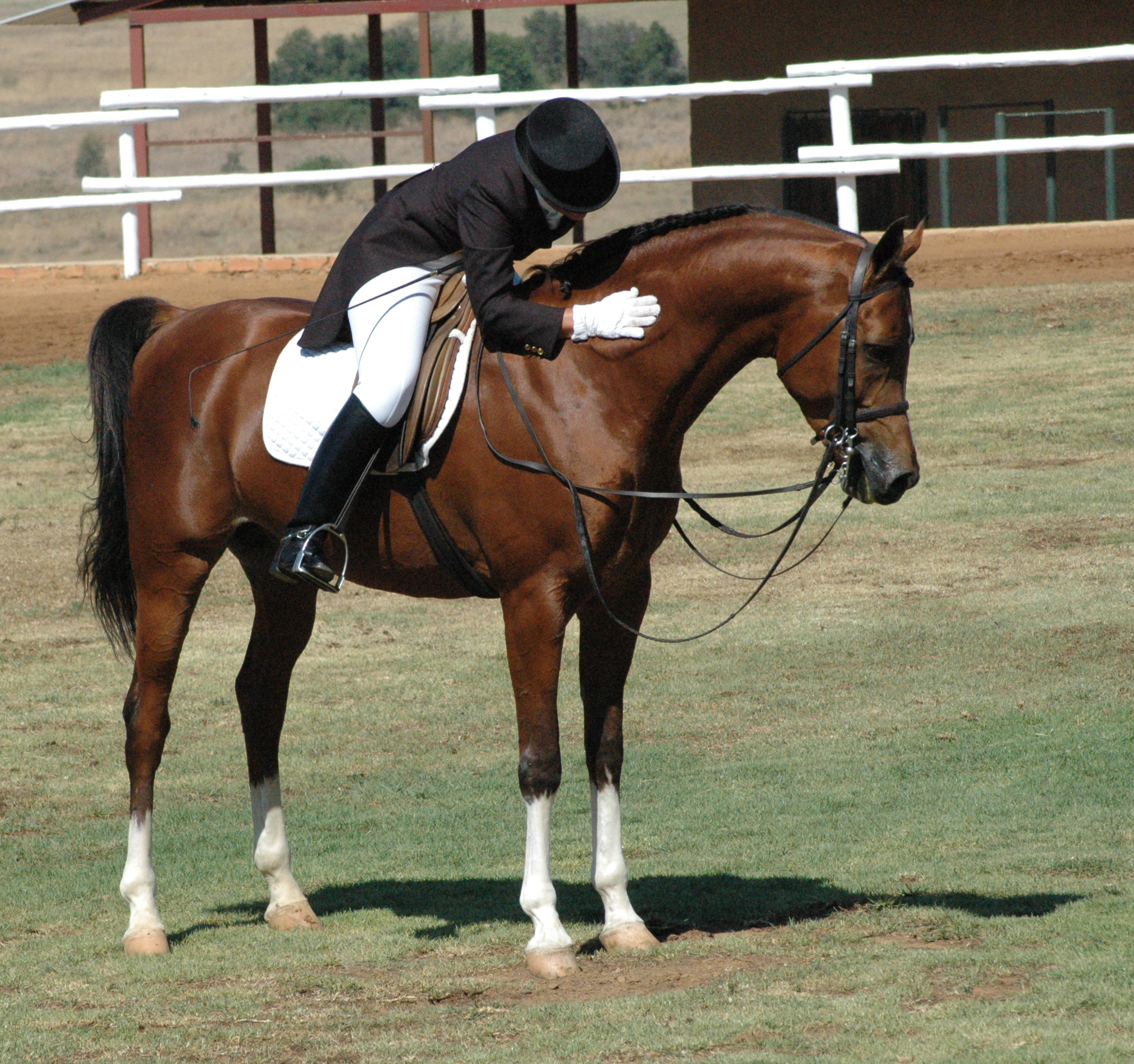
An Arabian, an example of a light riding horse

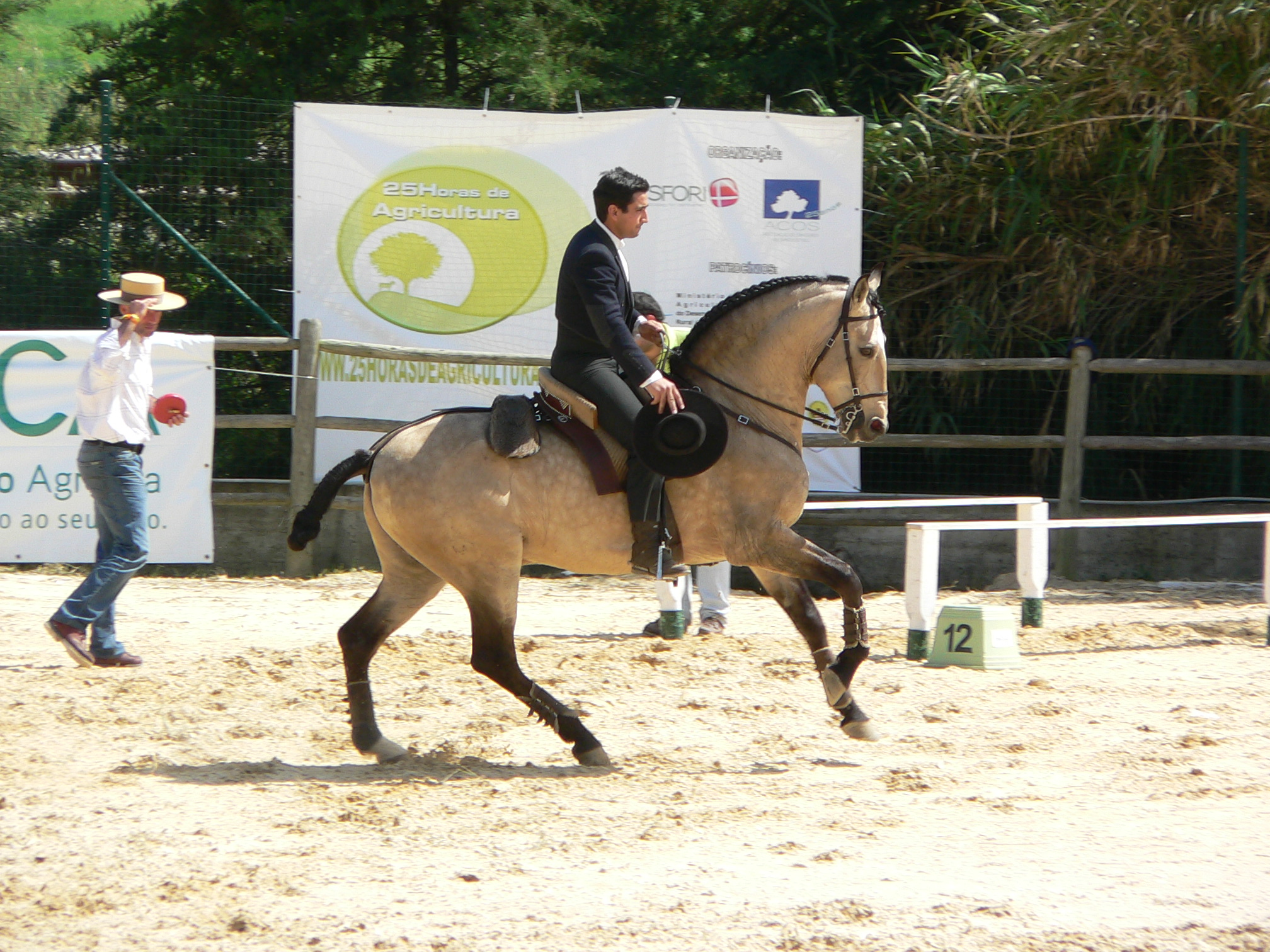
A Lusitano, an example of a heavier-bodied riding horse

A riding horse or a saddle horse is a horse used by mounted horse riders for recreation or transportation.

It is unclear exactly when horses were first ridden because early domestication did not create noticeable physical changes in the horse. However, there is strong circumstantial evidence that horse were ridden by people of the Botai culture during the Copper Age, circa 3600–3100 BCE. The earliest evidence suggesting horses were ridden dates to about 3500 BCE, where evidence from horse skulls found at site in Kazakhstan indicated that they had worn some type of bit. Facets of 3 mm or more were found on seven horse premolars in two sites, Botai and Kozhai 1, dated about 3500–3000 BCE. It is theorized that people herding animals first rode horses for this purpose, presumably bareback, and probably used soft materials such as rope or possibly bone to create rudimentary bridles and hackamores. However, the earliest definitive evidence of horses being ridden dates to art and textual evidence dating to about 2000–1500 BCE.

Many different horse breeds and types are suitable for riding, and body type varies widely depending on the equestrianism work they are asked to perform and the equitation style of the rider.

== See also ==
- Driving (horse)
- Domestication of the horse
- Polish sport horse
