= Furioso-North Star =

Breed of horse

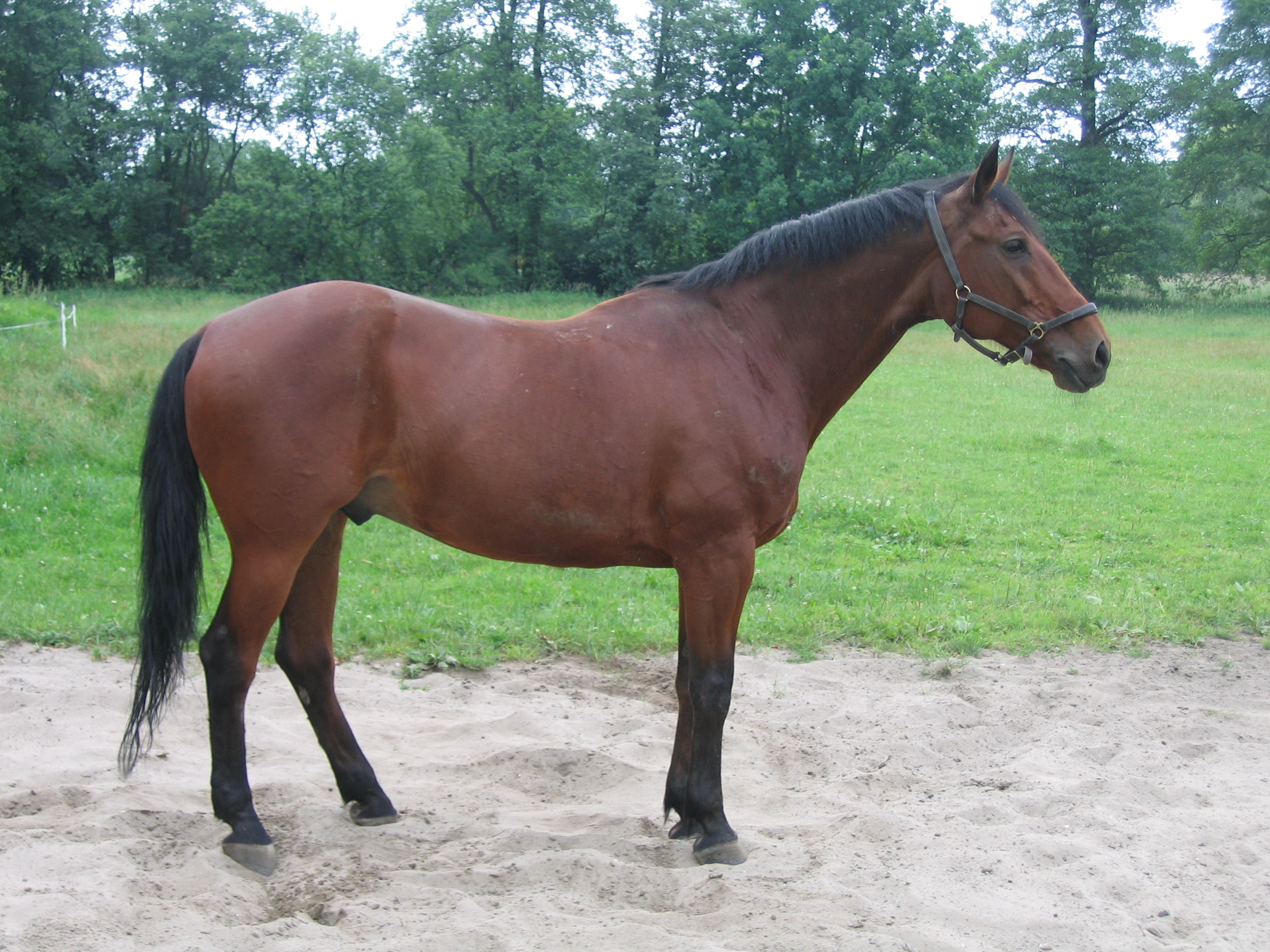
- Other names: Furioso
- Country of origin: Hungary, Slovakia, Romania

The Furioso-North Star is a horse breed developed in Hungary at the Mezőhegyes stud farm in the late 19th century. Today it is considered a warmblood breed, noted as a breed with a sound, durable build capable of light farm work, yet with a refined appearance that reflects its Thoroughbred influence.

== Characteristics ==
The Furioso breed averages 16 hands (64 inches, 163 cm) in height and is predominantly bay, liver chestnut or black. It is a medium-heavy horse, also bred in northeast Europe for competition and harness use. Once a popular breed in neighboring Romania, the Furioso-North Star is now said to be endangered there.

== Breed history ==
There were two primary stallions that are considered foundation sires of the breed. The first was a Thoroughbred stallion named Furioso, foaled Hungary in 1836 and who, beginning in 1841, was crossed with local Hungarian mares. The second was another Thoroughbred stallion, North Star (foaled 1844), who was imported from England in 1852, who was also crossed with local mares and possibly with horses of Norfolk Trotter descent. Some crossbreeding with Nonius horses may also have occurred. Initially, the two bloodlines were kept separate, with the Furioso line used to produce riding horses and the North Star line producing driving horses, but the lines were merged in the late 19th century.

== See also ==
- Nonius (horse)
- Norfolk Trotter
- List of horse breeds
