= Charolais horse =

Breed of horse

Charolais
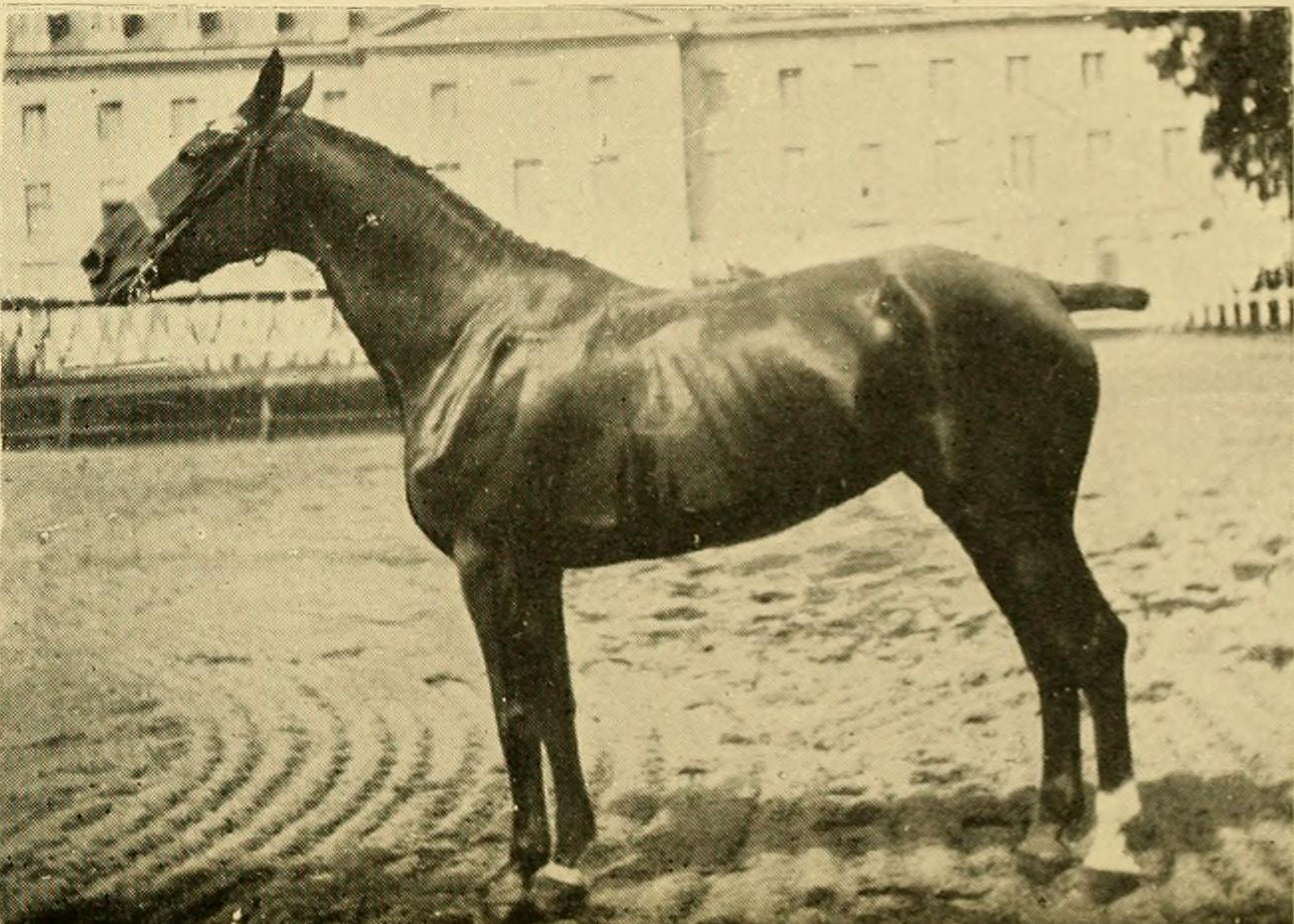
- Conservation status: extinct
- Other names: Charollais
- Country of origin: Charolles, France

Traits
- Distinguishing features: Small, robust breed of multi-purpose horse

The Charolais or Charollais is an extinct breed of warmblood horse from the Charolais, the country lying around the town of Charolles, now in the Saône-et-Loire département of Burgundy, in eastern central France. Like other French warmbloods, it was the result of crossing local agricultural horses with the Thoroughbred, and was known by the name of the region without ever having a specific stud-book. Like other French warmbloods including the Angevin, the Charentais, the Cheval Limousin and the Vendéen, it was fused with the Anglo-Normand in 1958 in order to create the national warmblood stud-book, the Selle français. It was originally used as a multi-purpose horse for riding, driving, and agriculture. During the late 19th century, additional Thoroughbred blood was added and a new type emerged that was principally used as a light cavalry mount. It was also used for dressage and show jumping.

== History ==
The original landrace ancestors of the Charolais include the Cheval Bourguignon (Burgundy Horse), which developed from horses bred in the Burgundy region in the Middle Ages. Although small, Burgundy horses were known for their endurance and robustness. They were used for riding and agriculture, and as coach horses. This type, combined with other blood, developed into the Charolais, which belonged to a group of French breeds called demi-sang or "half-bloods" – crosses between native breeds and Thoroughbreds. Some 19th- and early 20th-century sources claim that Arabian blood was also added from horses captured from the Saracens after the Battle of Poitiers.

Until the mid-20th century, the Charolais and other demi-sang breeds, such as the Angevin, Charentais, Cheval Limousin, and Vendéen, were generally known by the name of the region in which they existed, and did not have individual breed stud-books. As these horses were not separated by breed type, but instead by geography, no significant physical characteristics distinguished the Charolais from other demi-sang types that developed prior to the mid-19th century. Charolais horses were primarily raised in what is now the Saône-et-Loire department. The areas of Cluny, Charolles, Blanzy, Paray-le-Monial, and Digoin were preferred for breeding, due to the clay-limestone soils that favoured the development of the equine skeletal structure.

Multi-purpose types like the Charolais and the Morvan were slowly supplanted in farmers' favour by draught horses. The Nivernais breed, in particular, was preferred by farmers and threatened the existence of the Charolais. Thus, the original small multi-purpose strain of Charolais gave way to a type of small draught horse that was next crossed with purebred and crossbred Thoroughbreds until, by 1850, it had become a horse for cavalry purposes. It was thought by some enthusiasts, however, that this outcrossing reduced the quality of the breed, and many missed the old-style Charolais, which had disappeared due to a lack of demand and use. However, others thought that the outcrossings had benefited the Charolais breed: in 1919, one author stated that the breeding of the Charolais type was in excellent condition, and a report from the time stated that the favourite horse of King Albert I of Belgium was a Charolais named Titanic.

Like many other French saddle horse types, in 1958, the Charolais was part of a reorganisation of French horse breeding. Many demi-sang types, including the Charolais, were merged to create a new national breed, the Selle Français.

== Characteristics ==
The Charolais breed was small, and most closely physically resembled the Morvan horse, another now-extinct French type. The breed had a short head with small ears and a short, strong neck attached low on the shoulder. The body was short and rounded, with a broad croup and strong legs. They were generally considered to be small and inelegant. They were strong, robust, and hardy, the last of these traits especially so before the breeding changes of the 19th century, and were known for their pulling power.

The Charolais was appreciated for its gaits and endurance. It was known for its ability as a cavalry horse, and in 1933 was called a perfect war horse. It was also used for dressage and show jumping, and members of the breed competed in international events in these sports. It was considered to be a better galloper than the Anglo-Norman horse, another French breed.

== See also ==
- AQPS
- List of French horse breeds
