= Angevin horse =

Extinct French horse breed

Angevin
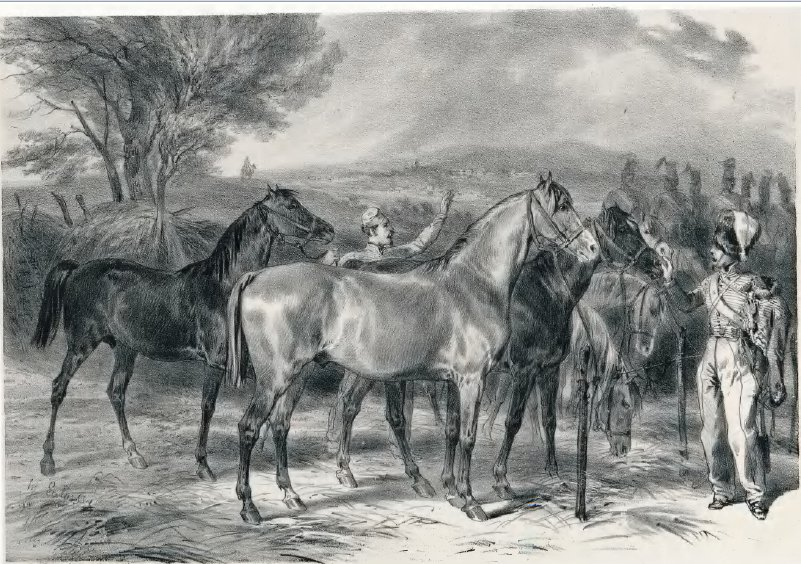
- Engraving by François Hippolyte Lalaisse from Atlas statistique de la production de chevaux en France, 1850
- Conservation status: extinct
- Country of origin: France

The Angevin was an extinct population of small, hardy bay horses bred near Angers in France. Under the influence of the French National Stud, the breed was crossed with the Thoroughbred, increasing its size and transforming it into a saddle half-bred horse, known as the Angers half-bred, particularly renowned for military use during the 19th century, from 1833 to 1850.

The breeding of this horse supported the high demand for military remounts in the Angers region, but competition from Vendée and Anglo-Norman horses, along with the advent of the automobile, led to a crisis in its breeding at the start of the 20th century. The decline of military cavalry and the shift of all regional service horse populations toward sport resulted in the integration of Angevin horses into the national Selle Français breed in 1958.

== History ==
The history of the Angevin horse parallels that of many regional horse populations in 19th-century France, a period when zootechnics programs transformed native French provincial horses by introducing foreign stallions through the French National Stud to create new breeds for military use. The Arabian horse and Thoroughbred were considered improvers. This crossbreeding, typically between a native mare suited for carriage or military purposes and a Thoroughbred stallion, was recognized in 1914 as producing a "half-bred" horse. Such "half-bred" horses were found in many French regions, often named after their region of origin.

The status of the Angevin as a distinct breed has been, and remains, debated, deriving its name from its primary breeding region around Angers. Since its integration into the Selle Français in 1958, and without an established stud-book, Angevin horses are no longer identifiable as a distinct type.

=== Origins ===
According to Eugène Gayot, before 1812, the term "Angevin horse" was not used, and horses in the region lacked a specific designation. A 1783 source mentions the Angers fair where Angevin horses were sold. Before 1789, there were no more than thirty stallions in all of Anjou, and by 1804, following the Revolutionary Wars, only four stallions could be gathered in Angers. The stud administration established a depot there, and the number of stationed stallions grew steadily thereafter.

==== Native Angevin horses before crossbreeding ====
Before crossbreeding with blood horses, Angevin horses were described as "small, weak, and poorly built," living year-round on poor pastures or communal lands, reproducing randomly without oversight, with young stallions castrated at two or three years old. They were highly rustic, requiring minimal maintenance costs. Farmers used them for work, feeding them only what they could graze in marshes or pastures, as artificial meadows were rare. Horses were taken out in the morning for work and returned to pasture in the evening. In 1810, a landowner in the Authion valley described them as a "poor breed," noting that "up to eight horses are used in light soils where two Brie or Beauce horses, with a single plowman, would do twice the work," though their low cost and hardiness suited farmers.

In 1814, two-year-old Angevin horses sold for a maximum of 180 francs at Le Lion-d'Angers, Briollay, and Châteauneuf-sur-Sarthe, with prices in the west barely reaching 72 francs. Reputed draft horses were imported from Brittany and Normandy.

==== Cavalry horse market ====
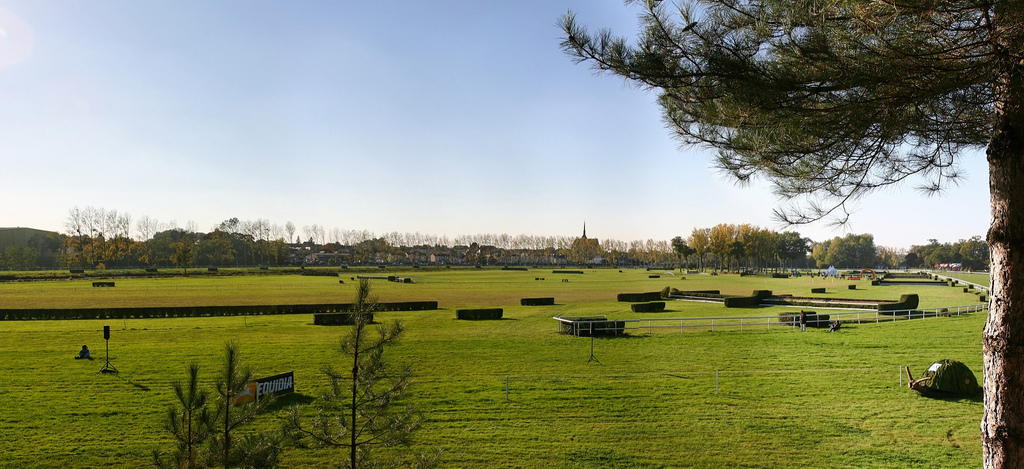
Le Lion-d'Angers is historically and culturally a key center for Angevin horse breeding. Pictured: a view from the racetrack.

The equine industry took root in the departments of the former County of Maine and Anjou no earlier than 1830, supplying horses for light cavalry and especially line cavalry to the remount depot in Angers. After the French Revolution, breeding was established near Segré. According to Eugène Gayot, "from 1812 to 1850, in less than forty years, the horse population in Anjou nearly doubled," growing from 25,000 to over 48,000 head. The Angers military horse depot, established in 1841, purchased saddle horses at favorable prices for various units, particularly light cavalry, artillery, and line. The success of Angevin horse breeding was attributed to the temperate climate of Anjou and the positive impact of crossbreeding with Thoroughbreds under the direction of the National Stud. Another factor cited by the Journal des haras was the development of Thoroughbred racing in Anjou during the same period, which led to the importation of broodmares.

Agricultural advancements enabled farmers to access more fodder, and the draining of marshes provided additional pastureland. However, the Imperial Veterinary School of Toulouse noted that the stud administration's push for poor farmers with defective mares to breed with Thoroughbred stallions resulted in weak foals that peasant breeders could not adequately nourish.

Angevin horse breeding, particularly active near Le Lion-d'Angers, entered a crisis in the early 20th century due to competition from Normandy and Vendée, which also produced military saddle horses, and the rise of the automobile, which gradually replaced luxury horses. The departmental prefect recommended breeding draft horses. Horse numbers in Maine-et-Loire continued to rise until World War I, which caused a general decline in livestock populations.

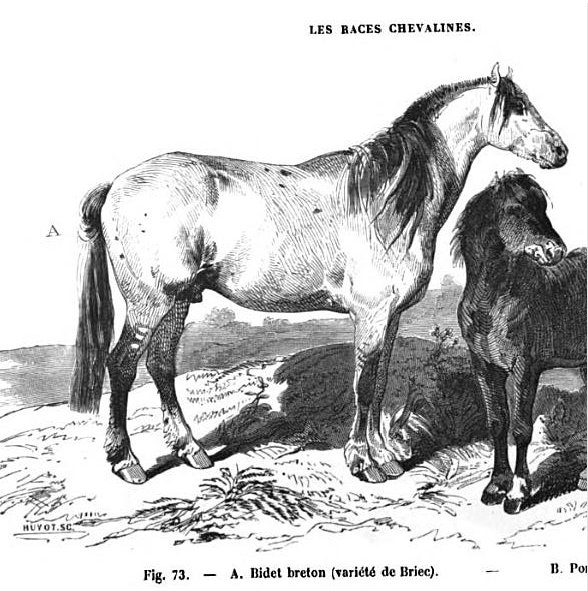
The Angevin's original stock was influenced by the Breton horse.

=== Crossbreeding ===
The first crosses between native Angevin horses and Thoroughbred stallions date from 1807 to 1815, when the Château de Craon was assigned to the stud administration. The goal was to produce larger, yet still compact and sturdy, animals. Since 1806, 220 stallions, including 22 Arabians or Thoroughbreds, were used for breeding in the Angers stud district, producing the foundation of Angevin horses.

In 1840, it was still very difficult to assign distinct and fixed characteristics to Angevin horses: as "industrial products" resulting from repeated crossbreeding, the horse of old is no longer recognizable, having undergone a complete species renovation resembling the Thoroughbred to varying degrees. The influence of royal stallions, particularly those stationed in Angers, was evident, with contemporary scholars attributing positive physical changes to them. The stud administration claimed credit for creating the "Angevin horse," particularly developed between 1833 and 1850.

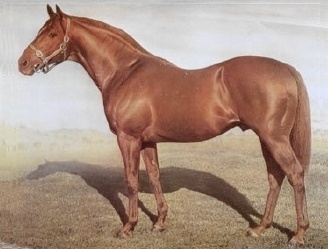
Example of a Thoroughbred, a breed crossed with the Angevin.

In Beaupréau and Segré, most Angevin horses resulted from crosses with Thoroughbreds and Anglo-Normans from the stud, with local small breeds or relatively sturdy Breton mares. In 1852, Eugène Gayot noted that "a large part of the Angevin equine population displays distinct characteristics," forming "a separate family, significant in merit and numbers, worthy of ranking among the most useful equine productions," though still lacking some homogeneity. Alexandre-Bernard Vallon and André Sanson described them as a "mixed species" close to the Anglo-Norman type.

Workhorses for farmers, however, were crossed with Bretons and Percherons. By 1928, Percherons dominated equine breeds in Maine-et-Loire, replacing oxen, which shifted from draft animals to livestock across western France.

=== Breeding practices ===
The stud administration criticized peasant breeders for neglecting their animals and for not feeding them oats during summer work months. Most breeders kept horses in low, warm, humid stables with poor air and light during winter. Grooming was largely unknown. Horses remained in pastures, marshes, and fallow lands, receiving no additional feed until snow or floods forced their withdrawal. These conditions hindered physical development but fostered docile, gentle, frugal, and hardy temperaments, enabling military horses to adapt quickly and perform well in service.

The marshy, wet soil of Maine-et-Loire, producing soft, poor-quality hay, was detrimental to horse breeding. In the west, the clayey, acidic soil limited cereal production, with 10 to 20% of agricultural land dedicated to animal feed, compared to 5 to 10% in the east. Only the Segré valleys produced quality horses. Improved feeding led to positive physical outcomes. In the 19th century, artificial meadows, fodder crops, and liming developed, reducing soil acidity and improving crops for livestock through added calcium.

=== Extinction ===
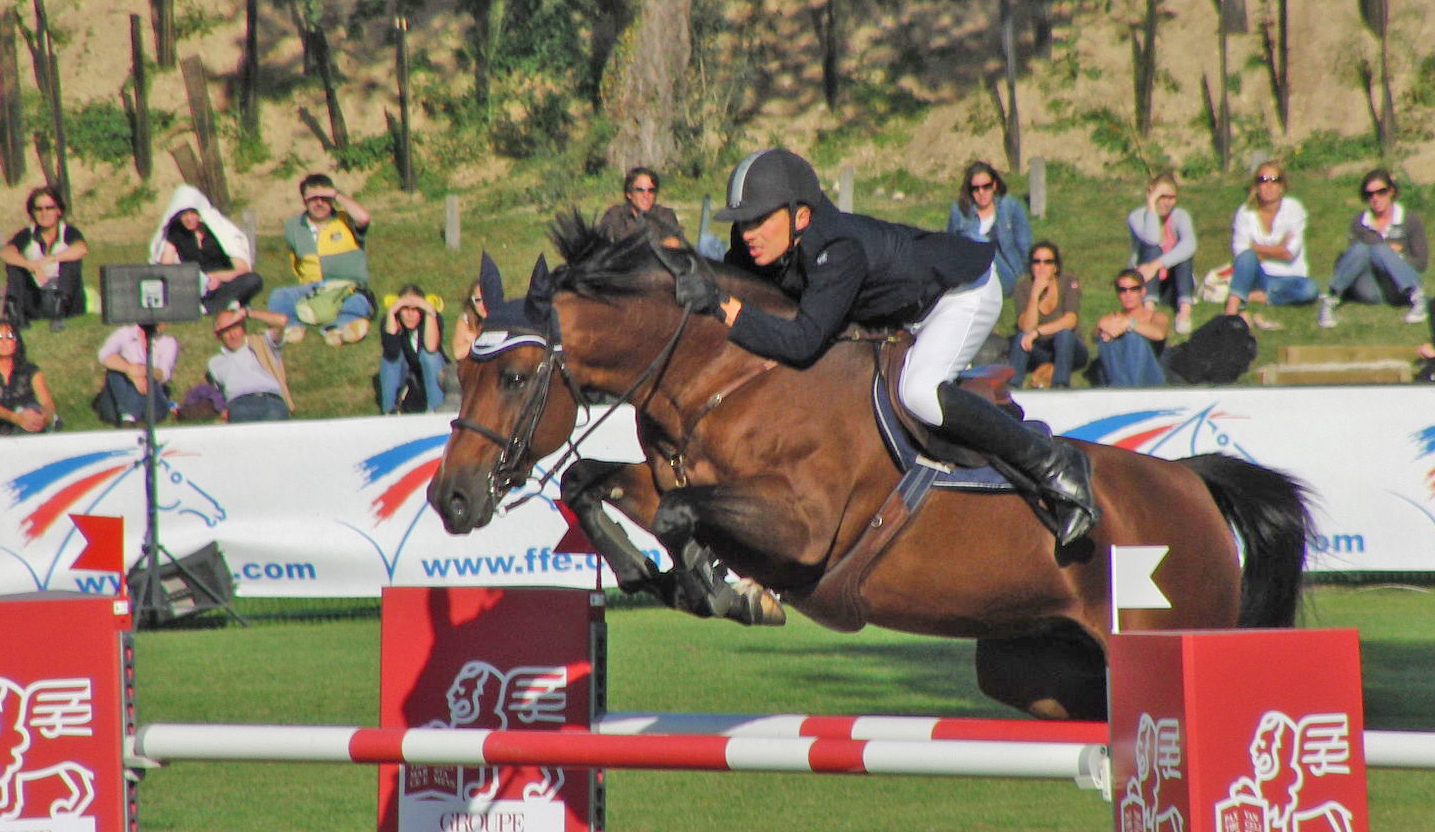
The Selle Français was created by merging all half-bred breeds, including the Angevin, for sport purposes.

In 20th-century France, cavalry, transport, and artillery horses became obsolete during World War I and were no longer purchased or used for these purposes after World War II. Concurrently, local military horse populations, whose numbers declined, began to be used for sport and leisure. This necessitated a national sport horse breed. In 1958, the Selle Français was officially established, incorporating all known regional half-bred horses, including the Angevin. Early Selle Français horses were less uniform, but offered significant genetic diversity, enhanced by further crosses with Thoroughbreds, Anglo-Arabians, and French Trotters.

== Description ==
The "small Angevin breed" measured 1.40 metres (4 ft 7 in) to 1.48 metres (4 ft 10 in), but "gained height over time." According to Eugène Gayot, Angevin horses of his era ranged from the size of a light cavalry horse to that of a line cavalry horse. The Comte de Montendre specified a height of 1.49 metres (4 ft 11 in) to 1.57 metres (5 ft 2 in) in 1840. In 1861, they had 50% to 75% Thoroughbred blood, "never falling below, rarely exceeding" this range. Their gaits were good, lively, extended, and regular, owing to their origins, making them relatively fast. They did not lack distinction. Their coat was typically bay.

=== Morphology ===
The Angevin had a regular conformation.

==== Head ====
The head, slightly heavy but with large, lively eyes set low and well-placed, neatly shaped ears, was highly expressive, well-proportioned, characterful, well-carried, and distinguished by a good attachment.

==== Forequarters, body, and hindquarters ====
The body was well-formed, broad, and low to the ground. The neck was short, straight, and lean, with a low, dry, well-formed withers. The chest was ideally open but could be narrow in horses too close to the Thoroughbred. The shoulder was well-proportioned, muscular, long, and sloped, with a well-defined scapulo-humeral angle. The back, loins, and hindquarters were short, strong, and well-formed, with a narrow flank and rounded, well-lowered ribs, sometimes slightly flat. The belly was developed and rounded, the croup horizontal and well-fleshed, with occasionally angular hips. The tail was well-set and carried elegantly.

==== Limbs ====
The limbs were lean and sinewy, with flat, well-formed, clean hocks, free of blemishes, though sometimes close-set or slightly pigeon-toed. The limbs were clean and well-grounded. The thighs were "well-muscled," with ample movement in all joints. The hoof horn was strong, and the hoof itself was well-formed and sure-footed.

=== Temperament and maintenance ===
It can be said that the Angevin horse is almost a raw product of nature; it has the advantage over near-wild products of being gentler and more submissive. The presence of man does not frighten it; it is easy to ride and train, likely because it has been accustomed to it early.

— Académie d'agriculture de France, Mémoires

The Angevin was celebrated for its frugality, endurance, energy, and sure-footedness, its great strength and flexibility, solid build, reliable temperament, and excellent vision. Its robust constitution made it resistant to fatigue. Traders once said the horse has brains to highlight these qualities. It could travel from Angers to Saumur and back in a single day, covering 96 kilometres (60 mi), eat at the manger in the evening, and be ready to depart again the next day.

Authors disagreed on the Angevin's temperament, some describing it as "docile and gentle," others as spirited and nervous. Fearless, it carried its rider well and willingly cleared obstacles, essential qualities for a war horse.

== Uses ==
The Angevin was renowned for possessing "the essential qualities of a good service and troop horse," primarily used for military purposes and consistently well-regarded by the Ministry of War. In 1840, cavalry regiments knew well the value of the Angevin horse; entire regiments were sometimes remounted with them, always to their satisfaction. Following the reestablishment of the French National Stud and the Angers stallion depot, the 26th Chasseurs à Cheval Regiment in Saumur acquired 250 young Angevin-born horses. In 1823, another chasseurs regiment remounted in Angers with these horses before campaigning in Spain, where they perfectly withstood the adverse conditions that made the campaign so disastrous. The best troop horses at the Saint-Maixent remount depot came from Maine-et-Loire, delivered there when they could not be sent to Alençon.

They were also used in racing and hunting on horseback.

Could we not recount the feats of numerous Angevin horses, tireless hacks, iron horses launched without preparation, on a hunting day, at full gallop across fields, over all kinds of terrain, cut by ditches, steep hedges, or embankments; kept thus without food or water for entire days?

— Société industrielle et agricole d'Angers et du département de Maine-et-Loire, Bulletin

They also served in agriculture, often hitched in pairs ahead of oxen to speed up plowing in the early 19th century. In the Saumur area and east of Angers, horses were also used as pack animals.

== Distribution ==
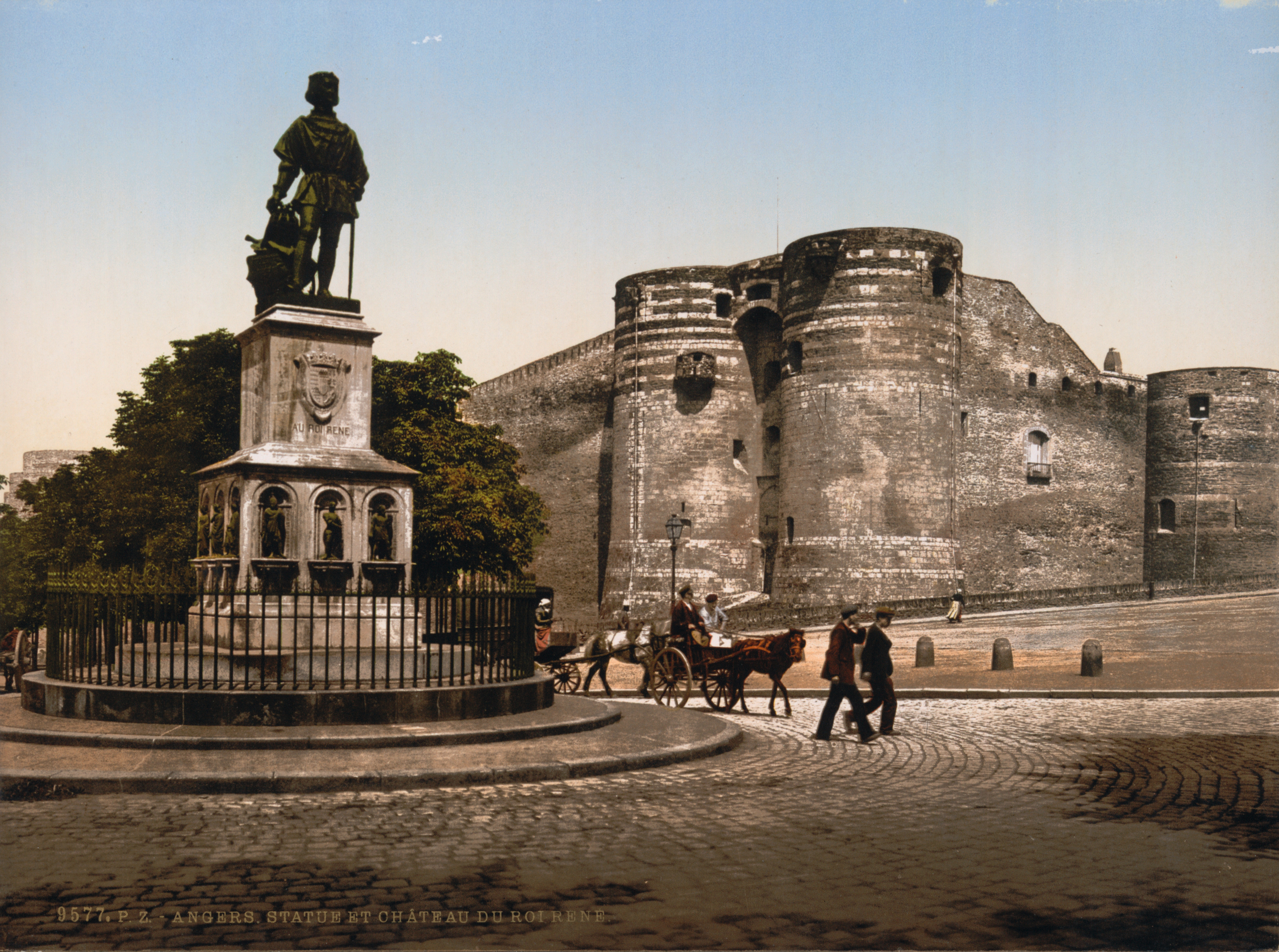
View of Angers in 1900, with small horses of unknown origin.

As its name suggests, the Angevin was primarily bred in the 19th century around Angers, where breeding stallions were stationed, but also in Sarthe, Mayenne, and Touraine. Maine-et-Loire was a production rather than a breeding hub. Breeders sold foals at 18 months to two years to traders who took them to Touraine, Limousin, Auvergne, and Normandy. The few horses raised locally were supplied to commerce or military remounts by their fourth year. Some Angevin horses raised in Normandy were later sold as Anglo-Normans.

Key areas for breeding military Angevin horses included the Arrondissement of Segré, which exported males at two years and used females for plowing, and the Craonnais, which supplied horses for hussars, chasseurs, and dragoons. The Arrondissement of Baugé was also known for its production. The Comte Achille de Montendre cited notable breeding operations at "Belle-Poule, du Mas, the Royal Cavalry School, Baracé, Serrant, de la Ronde, de la Poindasserie, Danne, and de la Bellière." According to Alexandre-Bernard Vallon, the best horses came from the arrondissements of Beaupréau, Segré, Angers, and Baugé. The Arrondissement of Saumur produced few. In Beaupréau and Segré, the horses had finesse, distinction, and character.

== Angevin horse in culture ==
Unlike neighboring provinces where horses frequently appear in heraldry, Anjou "seems to have shunned equine figures while recognizing their authentic value." Only two blasons with spurs, designed according to orthodox heraldic art, evoke the equine world.

== See also ==
- Selle Français
- Horse breeding in France
- List of French horse breeds

== Bibliography ==
=== Historical sources ===
- de Montendre (Comte) (1840). Des institutions hippiques et de l'élève du cheval dans les principaux États de l'Europe: ouvrage composé d'après des documents officiels, des écrits publiés en Allemagne, en Angleterre et en France et des observations faites sur les lieux à différentes époques [Hippic institutions and horse breeding in the main European states: a work compiled from official documents, writings published in Germany, England, and France, and observations made on-site at various times] (in French). Vol. 2. Bureau du Journal des haras.
- Académie d'agriculture de France (1853). Mémoires d'agriculture, d'économie rurale et domestique [Memoirs of agriculture, rural and domestic economy] (in French). Librairie Bouchard-Huzard.
- École Impériale Vétérinaire de Toulouse (1853). Journal des Vétérinaires du Midi [Journal of Southern Veterinarians] (in French). École Impériale Vétérinaire de Toulouse.
- Magne, Jean Henri (1857). Hygiène vétérinaire appliquée [Applied veterinary hygiene: Study of our domestic animal breeds and ways to improve them] (in French). Vol. 1. Labe.
- Moll, Louis; Gayot, Eugène Nicolas (1861). La connaissance générale du cheval : études de zootechnie pratique, avec un atlas de 160 pages et de 103 figures [General knowledge of the horse: Practical zootechnics studies, with an atlas of 160 pages and 103 figures] (in French). Didot.
- Vallon, Alexandre-Bernard (1863). Cours d'hippologie à l'usage de MM. les officiers de l'armée... [Hippology course for the use of army officers]. Vol. 2. Saumur: Javaud.
- Sanson, André (1867). Applications de la zootechnie [Applications of zootechnics] (in French). Vol. 3 of Économie du bétail. Librairie agricole de la maison rustique.
- de Soland, Aimé (1868). Étude sur les animaux de l'Anjou [Study on the animals of Anjou] (in French). P. Lachèse.
- Barral, Jean Augustin; Sagnier, Henry (1886). Dictionnaire d'agriculture, encyclopédie agricole complète [Agricultural dictionary, complete agricultural encyclopedia] (in French). Vol. 1. Hachette.
- Gallier, Alfred (1908). Le cheval de demi-sang, races françaises [The half-bred horse, French breeds] (in French). Laveur.

=== Studies ===
- Dubreuil, Jacqueline (1942). Économie rurale de l'Anjou [Rural economy of Anjou]. Angers: Imprimerie rurale de l’Anjou.
- Brouard, Emmanuel (2008). "L'élevage dans le Maine-et-Loire au XIXe siècle" [Breeding in Maine-et-Loire in the 19th century]. Histoire & Sociétés Rurales. 29: 95–131. doi:10.3917/hsr.029.0095.
