= List of Chinese horse breeds =

This is a list of horse breeds usually considered to originate or to have developed in the People's Republic of China, including Tibet.

Chinese sources distinguish between native or indigenous breeds, which have been influenced little or not at all by imported foreign stock, and 'developed' breeds resulting from inter-breeding of native and imported breeds. Some imported foreign breeds are bred pure; they are not listed here.

Name	Other names, if any	Notes	Image
Baise	Bose		
Baise Pony			
Balikun			
Barkol			
Bohai			
Chaidamu			
Chakou Post	Chakouyi		
Datong			
Elenchus	Erlunchun		
Ganzi			
Guanzhong			
Guizhou			
Heihe			
Heilongjiang			
Henan Light Draught			
Hequ			
Iyi			
Jiangchang			
Jilin			
Jinjiang			
Jinzhou			
Kerqin			
Lichuan			
Lijiang			
Mongolian			
New Lijiang			
Ningqiang			
Sanhe			
Shandan			
Sikang Pony			
Tibetan			
Tieling Harness			
Ujumqin			
Wenshan			
Xiangfen			
Xilinguole			
Xini	Xinihe		
Yanqi			
Yili			
Yiwu			
Yongning			
Yunnan			
Yushu			
Zhangbei			
Zhongdian			
