= Horses in China =

Horses in China may refer to:

- Horses in Chinese culture
- Horses in Chinese mythology
- Horses in ancient and Imperial China
- List of Chinese horse breeds
