= Quarter marks =

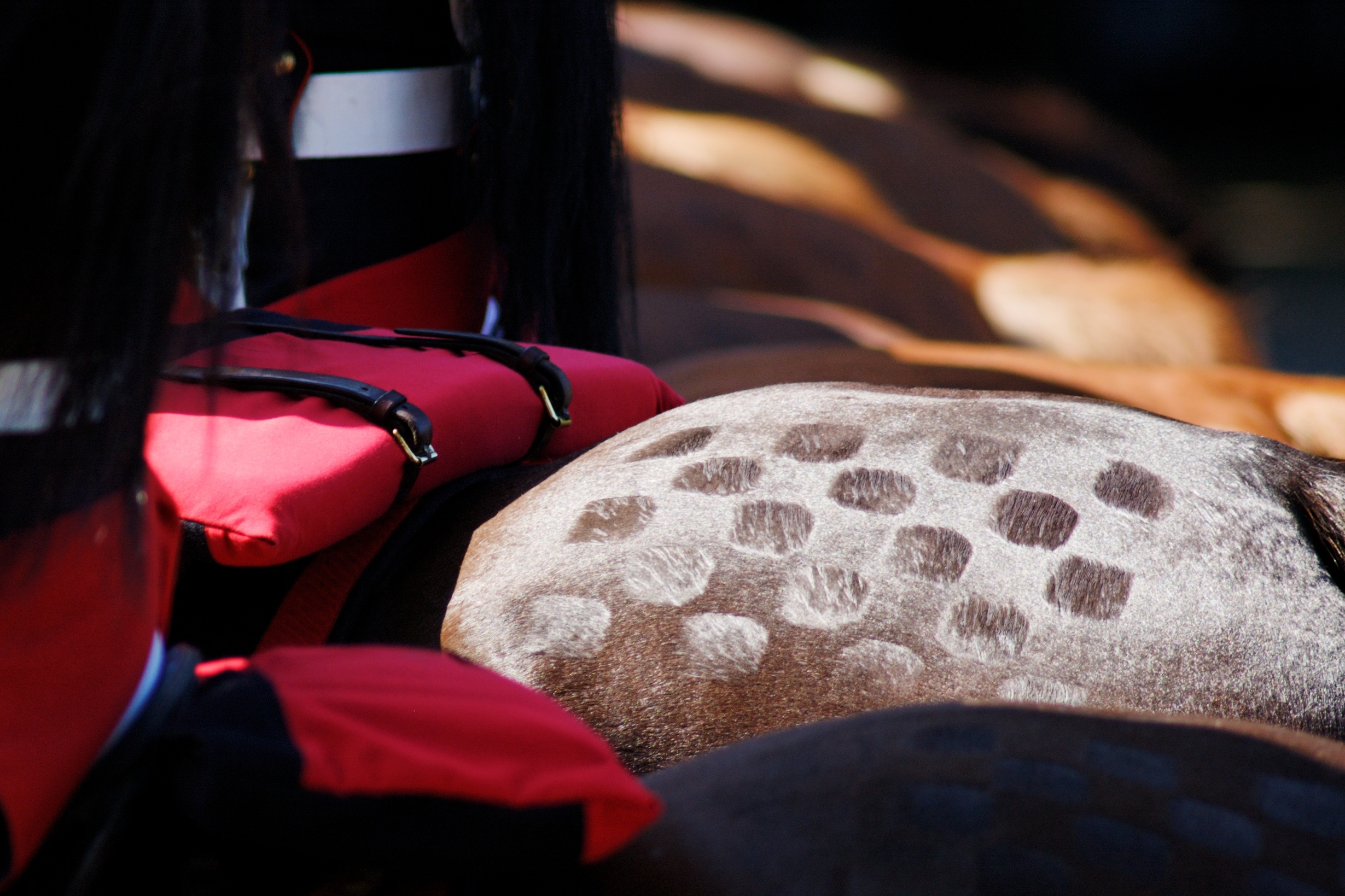
Closeup of quarter marks in a checkerboard pattern on a horse's croup

Quarter marks are a type of ornamentation on a horse seen in certain types of exhibition or competition. Typically, these marks are found on the croup of the animal and are created by combing its hair in different directions, creating contrasting areas. The classic design was created by hand-creating each square with a small brush or comb. However, in modern times, they can also be created quite quickly by use of a stencil lain on a given area with the exposed hair brushed in a different direction than other growth. Hair spray or setting gel is often used to help the pattern stay in place.

Commonly, quarter marks are made in a checkerboard pattern, but many variations exist. In addition to highlighting the shine and health of the horse's coat, some designs are intended to help define the musculature of the horse or simply as an identifying or fun mark. Use of modern stencils allows for creation of fanciful shapes such as stars or hearts. Quarter marks tend to go in and out of style in the horse show ring and are seen more in certain regions than others.

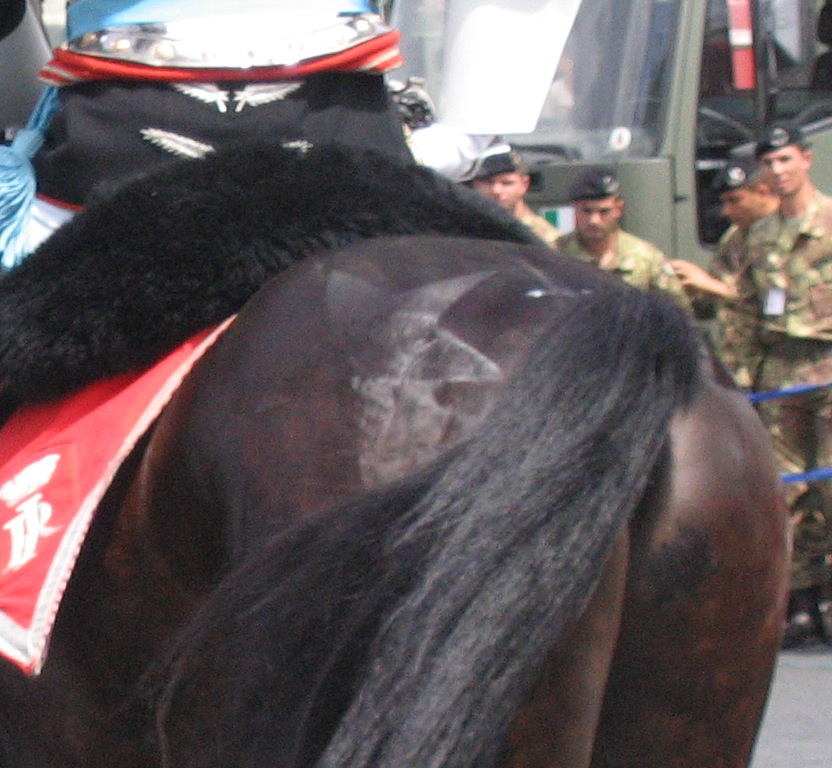
A star design, symbol of the Italian Republic, used as quarter marks on the horse of a Carabiniere of the Reggimento Corazzieri

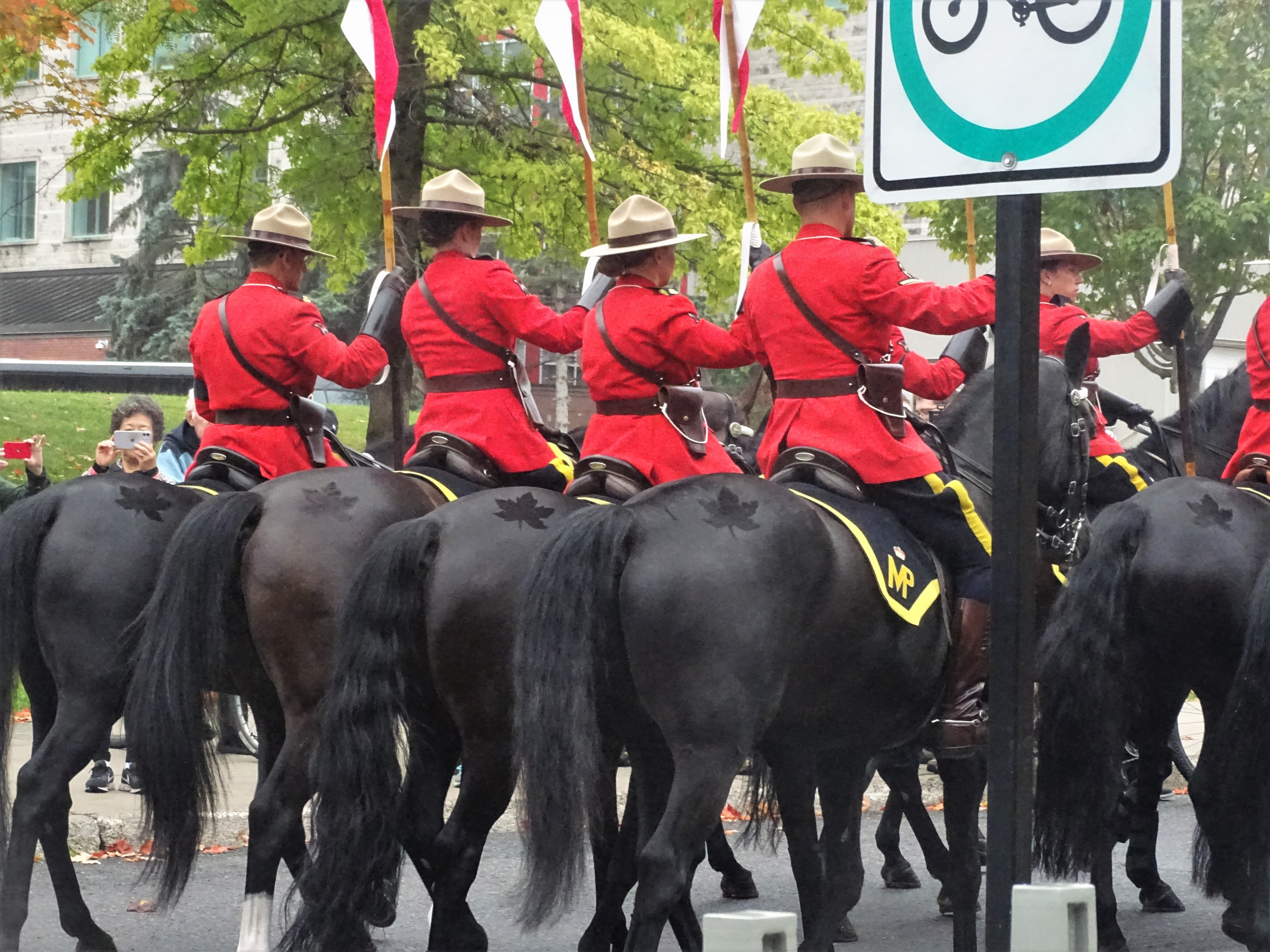
Iconic maple leaf quarter marks of RCMP horses

Quarter marks are frequently seen on police horses when performing ceremonial duties. One well-known example is the Royal Canadian Mounted Police, who, on ceremonial occasions, decorate the hindquarters of the animals with a maple leaf shaped design.
