= Baise horse =

Breed of horse

- Other names: Guangxi
- Country of origin: China

Traits
- Distinguishing features: Small, but both strong and quick; thrives at high altitudes

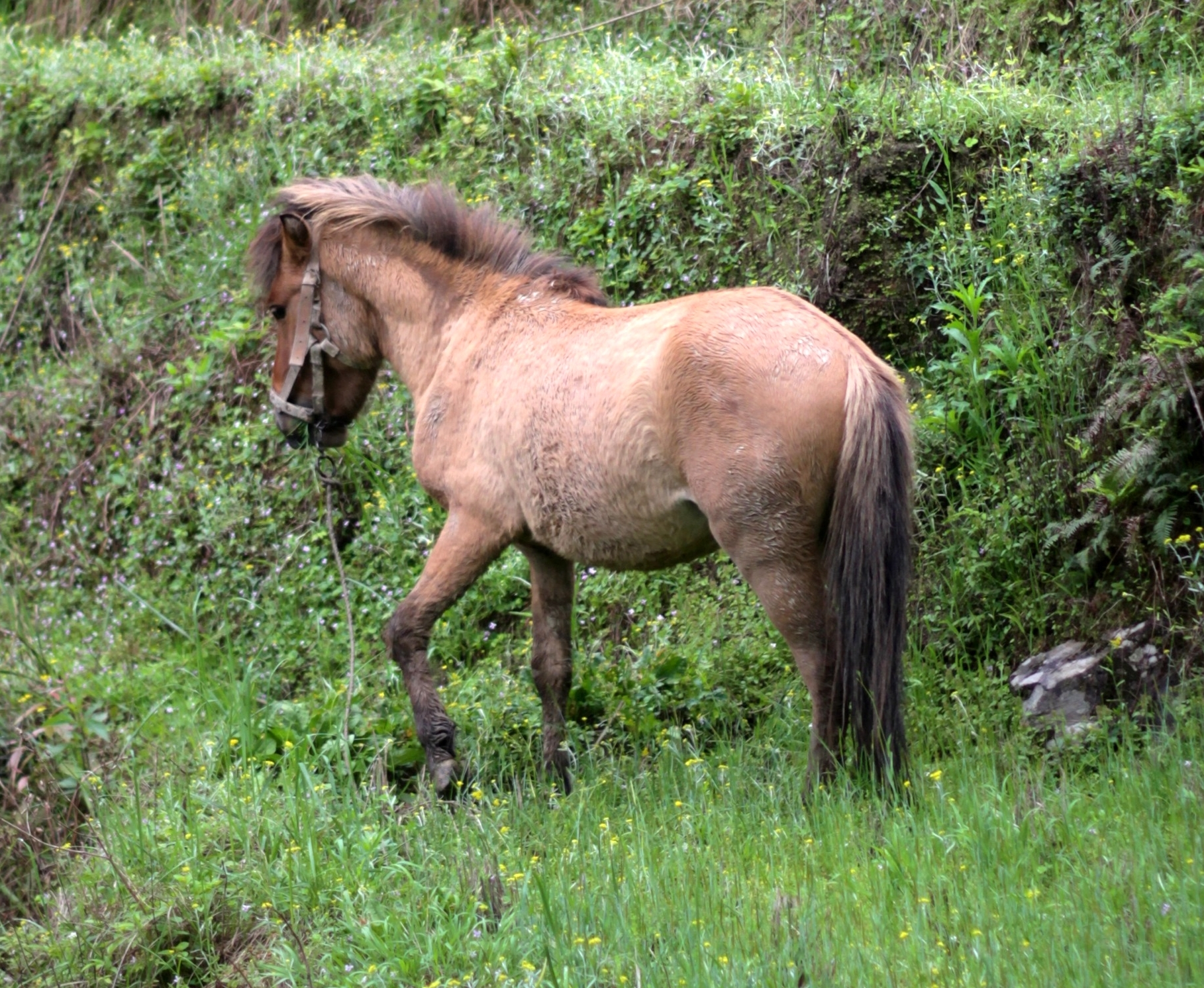
Horse along a terraced rice plantation, Longsheng, Guangxi, China

The Baise (also known as the Guangxi) is a pony-sized horse breed native to the autonomous region of Guangxi, in southeastern China. Like other Asian breeds (the Mongolian horse in particular), it thrives at high altitudes and roams freely when not working. Guangxi's mild climate has long favored horse breeding; bronze statues from the third to the first centuries BCE exist of horses very similar in conformation to the Baise.

== Breed characteristics ==
The Baise horse is small, with an average height of 11 to 11.2 hands (44 to 46 inches, 112 to 117 cm); it is smaller than other breeds in northern and western China. Its head is heavy, with a straight profile and wide jaw; it has a medium-length neck, running down to straight shoulders. Its legs are strong and well-developed, with strong hooves. The usual coat colors are black, chestnut, gray and bay. The Baise is strong and quick with a willing, able temperament. It is used as a riding and pack horse for tourism, on the farm and in harness; it is also used for meat.

Baise horses are an important part of Guangxi village life, and are included in traditional wedding celebrations.
