= Charentais horse =

Breed of horse

Charentais
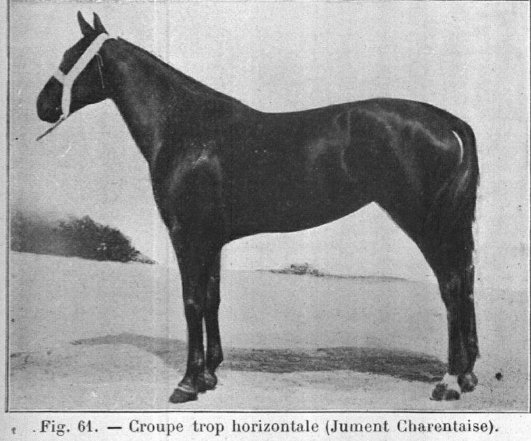
- Photograph from "Guide pratique pour la connaissance et l'élevage du cheval", 1911
- Conservation status: extinct
- Country of origin: Western France

The Charentais and Vendéen are extinct breeds of horse from western France. They were bred principally in the area around Poitou-Charentes and Vendée, France. They were used as a mount for light cavalry.

== History ==
The Charentais and Vendéen breeds both descend from the Poitevin horse. Ordinances published between 1665 and 1717 contain records of Poitevin stallions being sent to Fontenay-le-Comte. The history of these breeds can be compared with that of many regional horse populations during the 19th century, when new animal husbandry practices transformed the native horses of the French provinces through the introduction of foreign stallions via the Haras Nationaux to create new breeds for the army. The Arabian and Thoroughbred varieties were considered to be superior for breeding. This type of crossbreed, namely a native mare of carriage or military orientation bred with a thoroughbred stallion, was recognized in 1914 under the name "half-blood." Such "half-blood" breeds can be found in many regions of France, typically taking their names from their native regions.

=== Origins ===
The horses of the Charente basin were, according to Jean-Henri Magne, "as varied as the earth that nourishes them." To the west, in the marshes of Rochefort and Marennes, one could find horses with thick skin, strong manes, wide feet, poorly-formed legs, long and spindly barrels, capable of going for a long time without drinking, yet difficult to break in. André Sanson summarized their history as follows:

"In these marshes, before their draining, there were no cattle [...] It is enough to say that the horse does not count among any local race there. Mares with strong builds, long and narrow heads, bulky limbs and full of hair [...] were introduced there following the drying up of the marshes; then the administration of the stud farm came, ever loyal to its system, to stimulate the production of horses suitable for the cavalry. The stud farm of Saint-Maixent-sur-Vie and the stallion depots of Fontenay and Saintes necessitated the presence of cavalry-horse-supplying facilities in Saint-Maixent, Saint-Jean-d'Angély, and Fontaney."

— André Sanson, Économie du bétail: Applications de la zootechnie

The draining of the marshes thus transformed this breed, which came to take on lighter and more regular forms. Jean-Henri Magne noted in 1858 that "the ease with which these horses were transformed under the sapid and nutritional plants that were produced by the reclaimed pastures of Saintonge." Around 1780, the administration of the Haras Nationaux looked to stimulate the production of cavalry horses by introducing thoroughbred and Norman stallions to produce the type of half-blood breed sought after by the army. During the 19th century, the entire equine population of the marshes of Saint-Gervais and Saint-Louis, as well as that of the cavalry facilities of Deux-Sèvres, Charente-Inferieure, and Charente was composed of horses mixed with thoroughbreds and Anglo-Norman horses to varying degrees. André Sanson referred to this population as "heterogenous and heteroclite." In 1806, the stallion depot of Fontenay was replaced by those of Saint-Maixent and Saint-Jean-d'Angély. In 1845 and 1849, they were respectively moved to La Roche-sur-Yon and Saintes, where they are still found to this day. Around 1900, the high proportion of thoroughbred blood led to these facilities specializing in the breeding of saddle horses.

== Vendéen ==
The Vendéen breed was originally imported by the Dutch in the 17th century from Friesland. It was originally to be used for draining swamps, but was later crossed with Thoroughbred stallions to make it fit for service as a mount for light cavalry.

These breeds were combined with other lines to become the Selle Français.

== See also ==
- List of French horse breeds
