= Balikun horse =

Breed of horse

Balikun
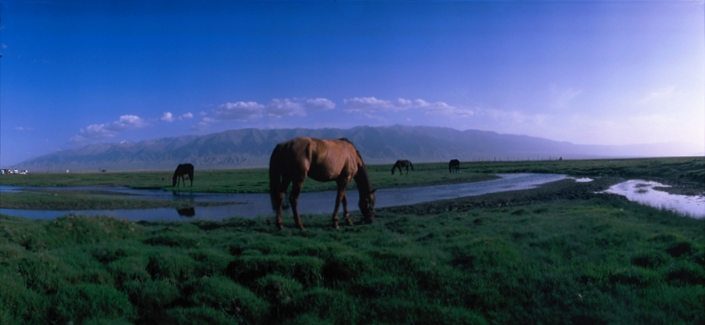
- Country of origin: China

The Balikun horse is a light horse breed from China, used for riding, light draft, and pack work.

== Characteristics ==
The Balikun breed stands at 14 hands (56 inches, 142 cm) high or more, and is most commonly bay or chestnut. They have heavy heads with small ears; the neck is thick, short, and well muscled; withers may be somewhat low; the back is short, flat, and very strong; the croup is sloped with a low-set tail. The shoulder is somewhat straight but muscular. This breed has powerful quarters and strong legs with good feet. The coat is very dense and thick, and the Balikun is able to live on steppe pasture, even at temperatures under −40 °F.

== Breed history ==
The Balikun comes from the Xinjiang Autonomous Region of China, and descends from Kazakh and Mongolian horses. In selective breeding for over 200 years, the Balikun became a special breed.

== Uses ==
This pony is very tough and well adapted to its habitat, which is frequently harsh. It is used extensively in the area for transport, but is also used as a light riding and draft pony. The Balikun can easily carry a pack weighing 220 pounds up to fifty miles in a day. It is considered a native breed in China.
