= Heihe horse =

Breed of horse

Heihe
- Country of origin: China

The Heihe is a breed of horse that originates from the Heilongjiang River (Amur River) basin in China.

== Origin ==
Along the boundary between China and the former Soviet Union there is a long river basin called Heilongjiang (Amur). Heihe city is the center of the Heihe horse breeding region. Beyond the forest/tundra to the north, the terrain is hilly with an altitude of 1,640 to 3,300 feet and a gradual slope. The area is rich in water resources. Average temperature is near 32F, with the minimum about -58F and the maximum in summer about 89F. Horses are absolutely necessary for both agriculture and transport in this area.

== History ==
The Heihe developed on the basis of Soulun and Mongolian stock. In the Longsha summary it was recorded that prior to the seventeenth century the Heihe area was occupied by the Soulun nation, which was connected to the Manchu. To enforce defense, the Qing government sent a large regiment of cavalry there that contained many Mongolian horses.

After 1820, lumber and mining for gold again brought Mongolian stock to the area. In 1908, Russian immigrants brought horses of unknown origin, and after 1930 some Orlov Trotter and draft stock was added to the growing mixture. During the years from 1937 to 1939, a Russian strain of Mongolian was brought in and at the same time the Keshan stud farm was organised. Anglo-Norman stallions were mainly used and four insemination centers were established. By 1940, there were sixteen stallions at this stud farm, among them two Anglo-Arabians and four Anglo-Norman, and others were crosses from Anglo-Norman and Percheron. Systematic selective breeding was not done until 1955, when the North Horse Farm was founded. Finally, in 1963, the new breed was officially recognised. Thus the Heihe is a developed breed.

== Characteristics ==
The Heihe breed has good, uniform conformation and a willing, obedient nature. The head is medium in size with a straight profile, the eye is large and open, and the ears are long. The neck is medium in length and wide at the base; the withers are high; the croup tends to be short; the limbs are strong with long forearms and short cannons. The hock is usually not straight enough in this breed. The Heihe is found in two types, riding-draft and draft-riding. The main coat colour is bay or chestnut. A few are gray or black, and other colours are rare.

These are powerful horses with good endurance qualities, easily able to pull heavy loads. They are also used for plowing and other farm work. Well adapted to the cold, the Heihe stays out overnight in temperatures ranging to -40F with no ill effects.
