= Anglo-Norman horse =

Horse breed developed in Lower Normandy, France

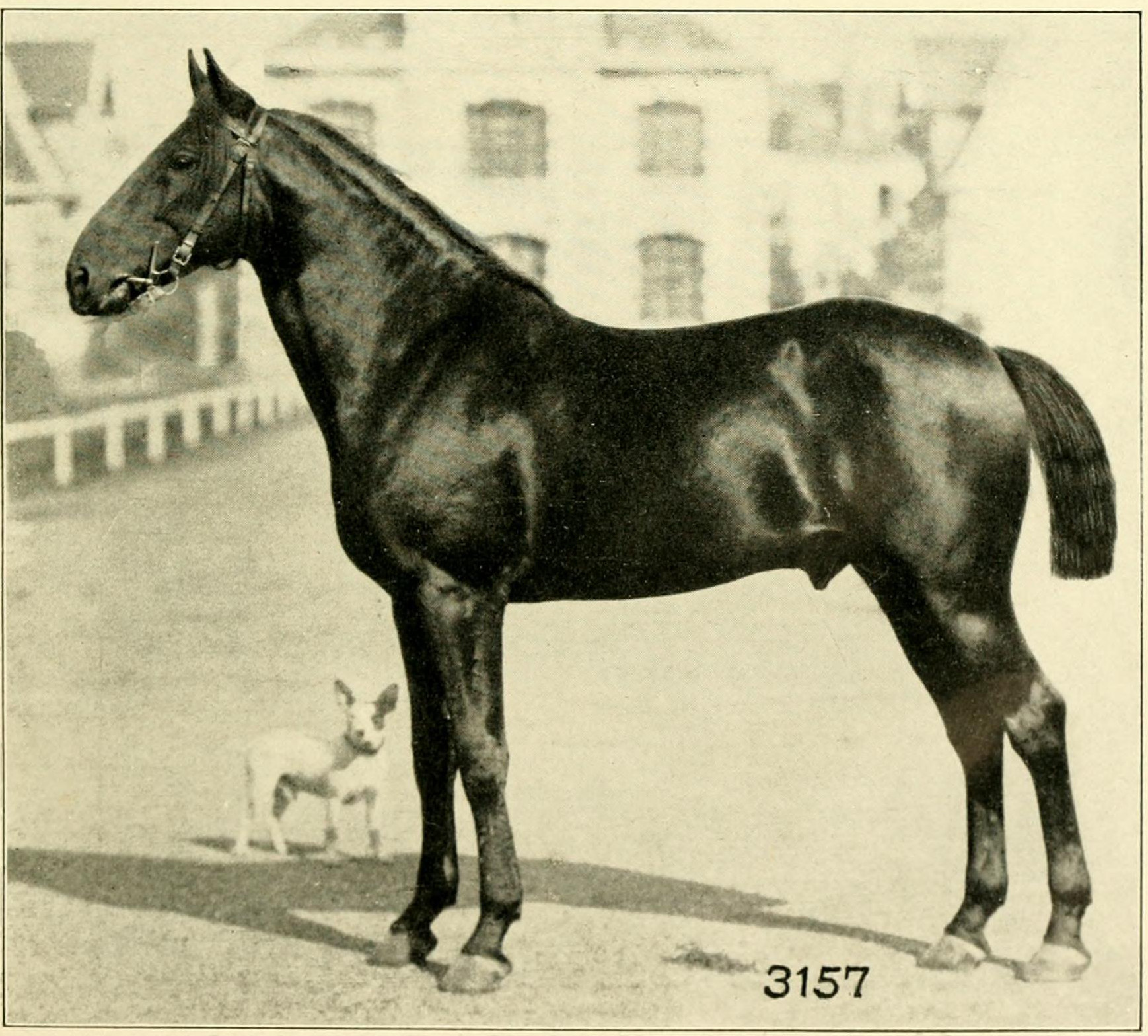
- An Anglo-Norman horse
- Conservation status: extinct
- Country of origin: France

The Anglo-Norman horse is a warmblood horse breed developed in Lower Normandy in northern France. A major center of horse breeding, the area had numerous regional types that were bred to one another and then crossed with Thoroughbreds to form the Anglo-Norman. Various body types developed within the Anglo-Norman breed, two of which were split off to form the Norman Cob and French Trotter. The remaining types were eventually standardized, although there remained some criticism of the "hybrid" nature of the breed's conformation. However, it is successful as an international sport horse, especially in the sport of show jumping. The Anglo-Norman also contributed to the development of several other breeds in Europe and Asia.

The Anglo-Norman was developed in the early 19th century, and along with Thoroughbred and local Norman blood, influences were seen from other breeds, including British and Russian trotting horses. By the mid-19th century, the Anglo-Norman was a popular breed throughout France, and in 1864 a breed association was founded. While often purchased by the French army and used as cavalry and artillery horses, there was controversy over whether the Anglo-Norman was the best choice for the military. The late 19th century saw significant improvements in breeding programs, although there remained a dispute between the goals of breeders and the needs of the military. Mechanization in the early 20th century significantly reduced demand for the breed, and fighting during World War II and the German occupation of France resulted in major damage to breeding centers and the deaths of many horses. While rebuilding their herds, breeders turned away from draft and carriage horses and began breeding sport horses for equestrian competition.

A stud book was created for the Anglo-Norman in 1950; during that decade, the breed became successful in international competition. In 1958, the Anglo-Norman is combined with other French types to create the Selle Français, the national French saddle horse. Despite active government support for Selle Français breeding programs, variations remained, and Anglo-Norman bloodlines continued to be distinguishable for decades after the merge. In the 1990s and 2000s, a movement began to reopen the Anglo-Norman stud book and recreate it as a separate breed from the Selle Français. The plan, which remains open, has been presented to the French Stud Book Commission and Ministry of Agriculture, and created controversy within the French breeding community. In 2015, the Anglo-Norman Stud Book is open again.

== Breed characteristics ==
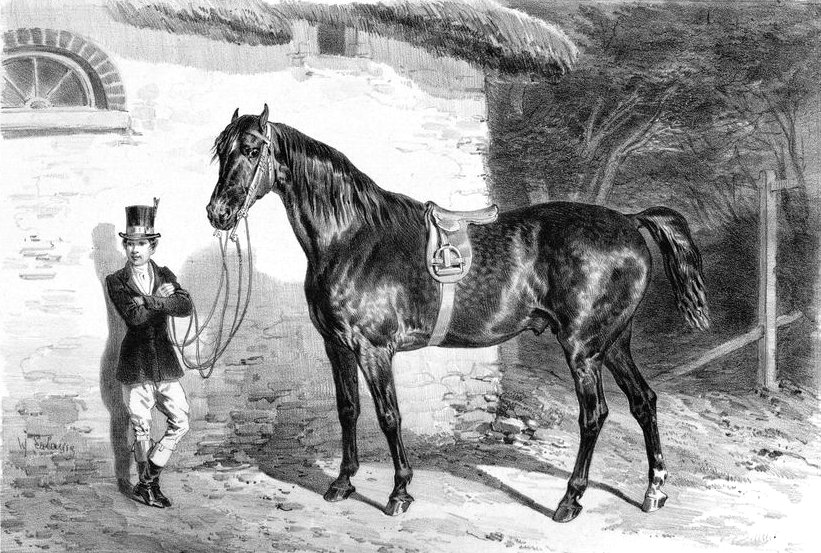
An Anglo-Norman of the Merlerault type, circa 1850

The conformation of the Anglo-Norman reflected its multiple influences. By 1861, the French government attempted to standardize the look of various historic Norman horse types by adding large amounts of Thoroughbred blood. The resulting offspring gave rise to the Anglo-Norman. However, in spite of these breeding programs, by 1909 when author Alfred Gallier studied the Anglo-Norman, he described members of the breed as "hybrids from various crosses". He distinguished three types: trotting horses used for harness racing, carriage horses, and military horses. He subdivided the military type further into heavy cavalry, light cavalry, "cavalry of the line" (a specific type used by the French) and artillery horses. Anglo-Norman trotters were the fastest in France, and were reputed to be patient and hard-working. The first official trotting races in France took place in 1836, in Cherbourg-en-Cotentin, at the instigation of Ephrem Houël, an officer of the National Stud. He believed that trotting races were the best way to select breeding stock for producing saddle horses. The best of the Anglo-Norman trotting horses emerged between 1820 and 1870, with five major stallions becoming the foundation bloodstock for the French Trotter breed, which officially split from the Anglo-Norman breed in 1906. The continuing breeding goal of the Anglo-Norman was to maintain a balanced breed with input from Thoroughbred stallions and heavier mares of the original Norman type.

By 1966, the Anglo-Norman breed had been further standardized and was described as averaging 15.1 to 16.3 hands (61 to 67 inches, 155 to 170 cm) high, although sometimes taller. The facial profile was convex, the neck long, and the shoulders and hindquarters powerful. The breed had a tendency to have a too-upright shoulder angle and one author still criticized the horses as "... [consisting] of two inharmonious and badly united pieces, one being Norman; the other, English", suggesting that better results would occur if breeders used higher-quality broodmares. Despite this criticism, Anglo-Normans were known for their jumping abilities, with many successful horses competing at the international level.

== History ==
The original horses in Normandy and Brittany were small horses called bidets, introduced by the Celts, who settled in ancient Gaul beginning about the third century BC. Later, the Romans crossed them with larger mares. By the 6th century, the practice of horse racing was documented in the region, and beginning in the 10th century, these "Norman horses" were desired throughout Europe. During the 16th century, Norman horses were known to be heavy and strong, able to pull long distances, and used to pull artillery and diligences. Barb and Arabian blood was added during the reign of Louis XIV.

The development of the modern Anglo-Norman horse is similar to that of many other French regional equine populations of the 19th century, when government-run national studs transformed indigenous French horses by introducing foreign stallions. Arabians and Thoroughbreds were major influences. The most common crossbreeding was between native mares used by the military or for pulling carriages and Thoroughbred stallions, and by 1914 these types were recognized as "demi-sang" or "half-blood" horses. Half-blood horses were found in many French regions, and different types were usually named after the regions in which they were bred. The origin of the Anglo-Norman was in Lower Normandy, known for horse breeding, thanks to its climate and soil. The breed developed region-specific specializations. Le Merlerault is the oldest area of origin, and mainly produced saddle horses, while the Cotentin and Auge valleys produced carriage horses. The main center for breeding, especially during the Second French Empire (1852-1870), was the plains around Caen, where young foals were placed on pasture. The National Studs at Saint-Lô and du Pin, originally military studs for the breeding of cavalry horses, also participated in the breeding of Anglo-Norman horses. At the end of the 19th century, in the Orne, the Anglo-Norman arose almost exclusively in the district of Alençon, specifically Merlerault, with a few being bred in the department of Calvados. Today, Normandy, still a horse breeding center, is home to 20 percent of all mares of the Selle Français breed, the national French sport horse developed in large part from the Anglo-Norman. The region has produced numerous Selle Français that have been successful in international competition.

During its early development, the Norman horse, also known as the Carrossier Normand, had several distinct types: the Merlerault; the horse from the plains of Caen; the Cotentin, from the area of the same name; the horse of La Hague; and other, more minor, variations. From Alençon, the Merlerault was developed from the Thoroughbred and was very popular at the end of the Ancien Régime, which lasted until the late 18th century. It was a mid-sized type, particularly suited for riding and pulling small carriages. The Cotentin was the oldest type of Carrossier Normand from which the Anglo-Normans were in large part developed, and was also the ancestor of the Norman Cob. Intended for the luxury carriage trade, Cotentin horses were larger and slower than trotting horses bred for racing. Standing 14.3 to 15.3 hands (59 to 63 inches, 150 to 160 cm), the type was almost always black in color, allowing drivers to easily form matched teams. Until 1775, Cotentin horses were unrivaled in popularity in France and some other parts of Europe as carriage horses, and remained one of the most popular carriage horse breeds in the world until the early 19th century, when they disappeared due to unchecked crossbreeding.

=== 19th century ===
After the Napoleonic Wars, there were almost no saddle horses remaining in France. This situation was exacerbated by improvements to the roads, resulting in a large demand for carriage horses, further reducing demand for riding horses. Between 1815 and the 1850s, only the wealthy and the army continued to purchase riding horses. Early in the 19th century, in Lower Normandy, breeders focused on the Carrossier Normand, the ancestor of the Anglo-Norman and the French Trotter, which was mainly used as a carriage horse. When the Carrossier Normand was crossed with Thoroughbreds, a practice which likely started around 1830, the resulting mix was called the "Anglo-Norman". When other local native mares were crossed with Thoroughbreds and Arabians, however, the early results were disappointing. However, despite very low population numbers of riding horses, in the early 1850s, author Ephrem Houël noted a type of Norman saddle horse still extant in Le Merlerault.

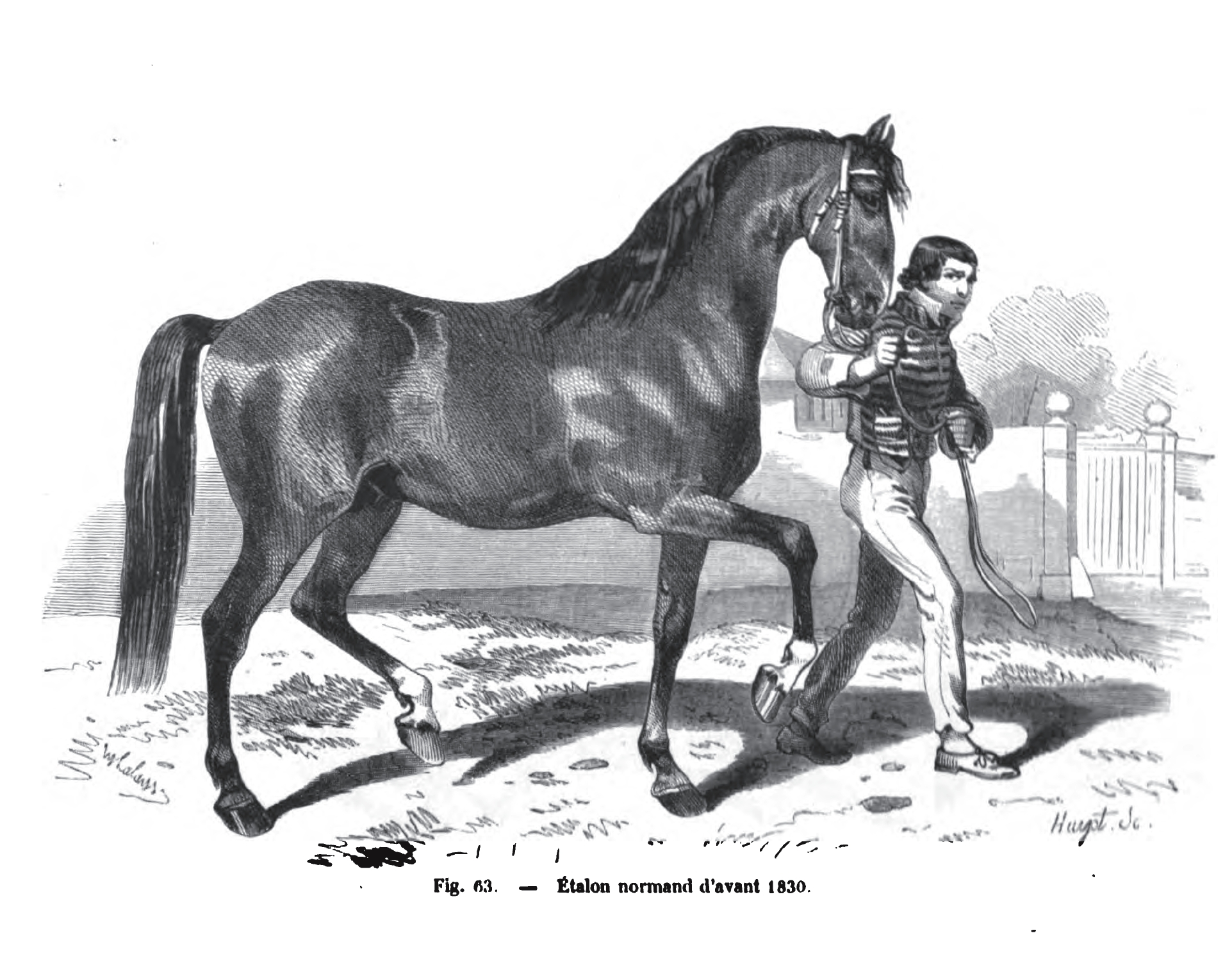
Norman stallion before 1830

Beginning in the early 1850s, with the arrival of the Second French Empire, the Anglo-Norman became a popular breed in France, competing with the Thoroughbred. It was reputed to be a versatile horse, appropriate for riding and pulling light carriages. From 1840 to 1860, the breed was further influenced by part-Thoroughbred trotting horses from England. Local Norman mares were crossed with imported Thoroughbreds, Norfolk Trotters, Orlov Trotters and other crossbred horses, which themselves had Norfolk and Mecklenburger blood. By 1855, the quality of the resulting animals had ensured the breed's success, and the Anglo-Norman spread throughout France, especially supplanting another type of riding horse from the south, the Limousin horse. In 1864, the Société du cheval français de demi-sang (Society of French Half-Blood Horses) was founded, which later became the Société d'encouragement à l'élevage du cheval français (Society to Encourage French Horse Breeding). The breeders spread the description of Norman horses, particularly Anglo-Normans, as versatile horses that could be used for both riding and driving.

The French conquest of Algeria (1830-1847) brought the Anglo-Norman into competition with the Barb horse. In 1873, the Bocher law was passed, which established premiums for French horse breeders, while taxing imported horses. The protectionism was the result of the desire of native French breeders to protect their interests against imports from the French colonies. The law was named after Edward Bocher, a politician from Calvados, who argued that the law was supportive of French agriculture, and especially the Anglo-Norman breed. He called the Anglo-Norman a "horse of the time ... suitable for all services." He said that they were useful for both riding and driving, and sought after by both military and commercial interests. The law significantly increased national breeding standards and encouraged the production of half-blood horses, especially Anglo-Normans, for military use. The development of the Anglo-Norman saddle horse breed had long been delayed by a focus on the production of fashionable carriage horses. This resulted in the military imposing major breeding changes on breeders, who were often unaware of the jobs their horses performed for the military. However, conflict between breeders and the military often resulted from disagreements over breeding aims.

From the 1830s to the interwar period (1919–1939), the Anglo-Norman was one of the main horses used by the French cavalry. Although author Alfred Gallier stated that it was a good breed for this use, many opposing scholars argued that this was not the case. Military requirements conflicted with Norman breeders, as the carriage horses preferred by the breeders were very different from the style sought by the military, which required fast horses with stamina and agility. According to military equestrian Denis Bogros, the economic weight of the Norman horse breeders was such as they negatively influenced the effectiveness of the French army until the early 20th century, producing only large, overweight trotters that became fatigued more easily than Barbs or Arabians. Bogros states that breeders of Norman horses managed to deceive the French government, through powerful lobbying groups, by selling the military rejects from the breeding programs. The Anglo-Norman was a commercial success as carriage horses, but proved worthless for the cavalry. This led to the creation of the Société du cheval de guerre (Society of the War Horse), which in 1906 severely criticized the use of the Anglo-Norman. Bogros considered the Anglo-Arabians bred near Tarbes to be much more useful for the military.

=== 20th century ===
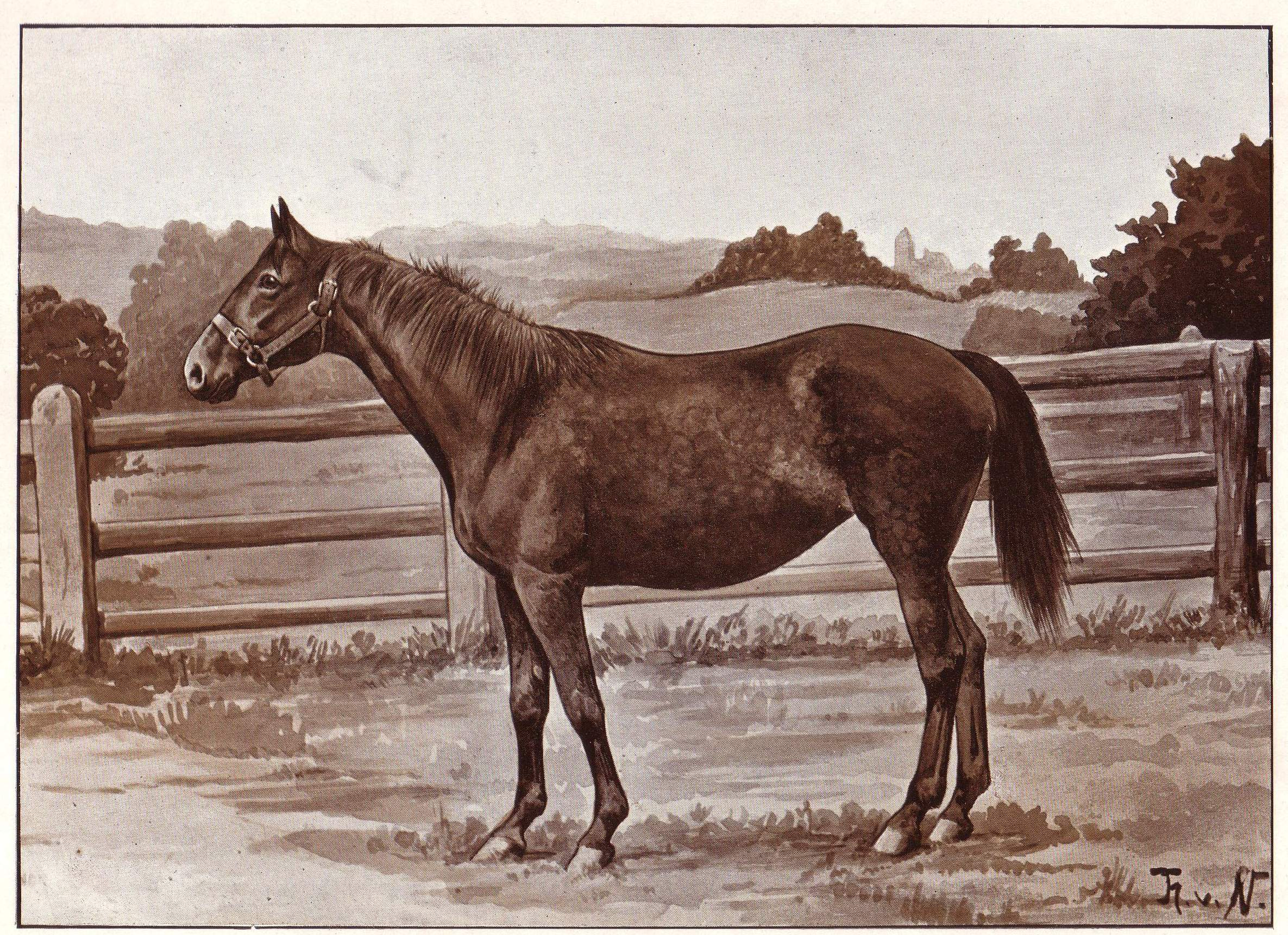
An Anglo-Norman mare, 1904 book illustration from a painting by Thomas von Nathusius

With the mechanization of transport and the military in the 20th century, the Anglo-Norman was no longer in demand as a carriage and military horse. In addition, World War II and the German occupation of France caused significant damage to the Norman homeland of the breed as fighting destroyed farms and killed half of the horses at the National Stud at Saint-Lô. Most of the surviving were of the Norman Cob breed, and horses lost their status as animals of luxury and leisure. Many farms were left in ruins, and breeders were left rethinking their breeding aims. Certain provisions of the Marshall Plan convinced them not to focus on breeding draft horses, and that type began to disappear. Instead, emphasis shifted toward producing horses for equestrian sports, and a stud book was created for the Anglo-Norman breed on December 7, 1950, at Saint-Lô. In the 1950s and 1960s, the Anglo-Norman became a major force in international equine competition. At the 1964 Summer Olympics, the Anglo-Norman Lutteur B won a gold medal in show jumping.

In 1958, the Anglo-Norman studbook was combined with other regional warmblood saddle horses such as the Demi-sang du Centre and the Vendéen in order to create a unified national warmblood studbook for the Selle Français or French saddle horse. The French government actively supported the merger of regional types and breeds with a large financial appropriation. In spite of this merger, for decades afterwards, horses from Anglo-Norman bloodlines were clearly identifiable within the Selle Français due to differences in conformation.

In August 1996, breeder Fernand Leredde, of the "Haras des Rouges" stud farm, developed the idea of the Cheval de Sport Anglo-Normand (CSAN, or Anglo-Norman Sport Horse), to preserve the genetic heritage of four generations of Anglo-Norman horses still extant within the Selle Français breed. The plan moved forward in August 2008 with the support of other professional breeders. Their argument was that the Selle Français had become increasingly crossed with other European breeds since the advent of artificial insemination in 1980 and the opening of the stud book to horses of foreign breeds in 2000; the theory of jus soli allowed horses of foreign bloodlines to be called Selle Français if they were born in France. The breeders allying themselves with Leredde prefer to return to the original French Anglo-Norman as a regional sport horse. However, when Anglo-Norman breeders as a whole were asked to vote, they rejected the idea of amending the studbook.

The idea for the new stud book was presented in December 2009 and November 2011 to the Commission des livres généalogiques (Stud Book Commission) and on May 24, 2013, to the Ministry of Agriculture. The president of the Association nationale du selle français (French Saddle Horse Association), Bernard Le Courtois, publicly spoke out against the idea on June 18, 2013, arguing that competition from other countries is already strong in the world of sport horse breeding, and that creating competition within France should be avoided. He described the proposed re-opening of an Anglo-Norman stud book as "criminal", saying it would be a step backwards led by a "small group of unscrupulous and fanciful breeders". In response, the Syndicat des Éleveurs et Cavaliers professionnels de chevaux et poneys de sport (Union of Breeders and Professional Riders of Horses and Sport Ponies) defended the project by stating that the breeder behind the Anglo-Norman stud book project is one of the top in his field in the world, while the Selle Français stud book is "the largest and the most in decline in Europe". In August 2014, this new stud book was approved by the French government, and made official on May 27, 2015, submitted for publication in the JORF edition of June 4, 2015. As of September 2015, this stud-book has no horses registered in it yet.

== Influence on other breeds ==
The Anglo-Norman was used to create several other breeds of horses throughout Europe and Asia. These included the Greek Andravida, which was created by crossing native Greek mares with Anglo-Norman stallions, and the Swiss Freiberger, a blend of Anglo-Norman lines with Thoroughbreds and native horses from the Jura Mountains. The Hungarian Nonius breed stems from an Anglo-Norman stallion named Nonius Senior, and Anglo-Norman blood was also used to add refinement to the German Oldenburg, through the stallions Condor (born 1950) and Furioso II, a Selle Français. The Anglo-Norman was used to create the Polish Sokolski horse and the Chinese Heihe breed.

== See also ==
- List of French horse breeds
