= Rump (animal) =

Part of an animal that is behind the loins and below the tail

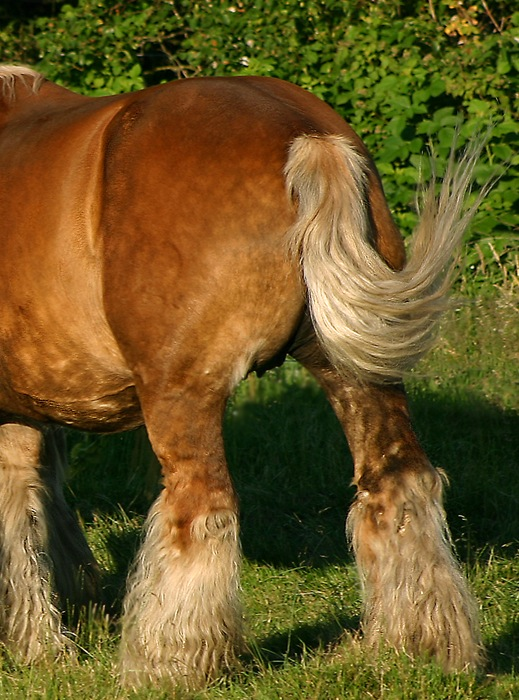
The rump is anterior to the animal's tail (here on a draft horse)

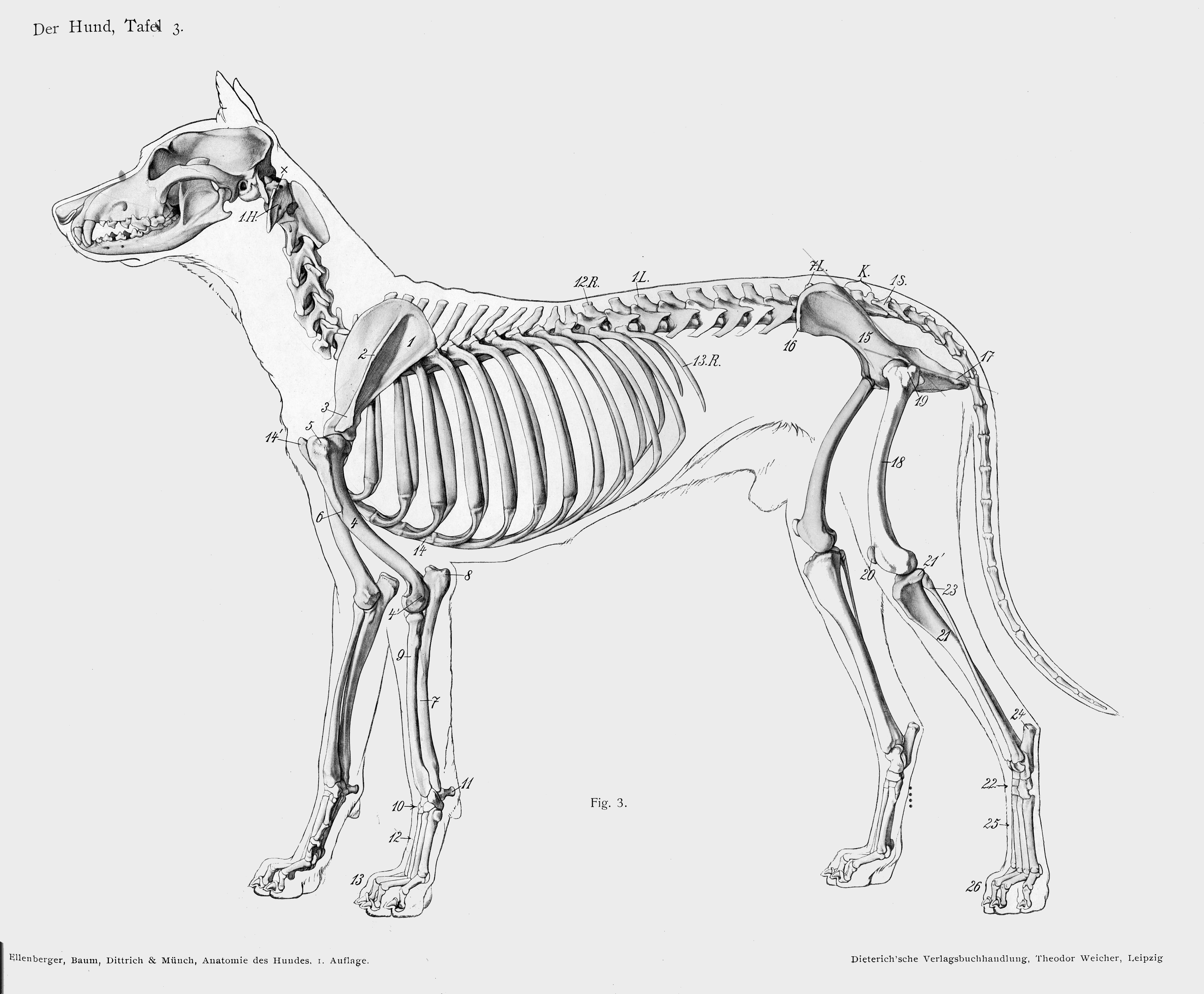
Parts of a dog, rump labeled 1L, dock labeled K

The rump or croup, in the external morphology of an animal, is the portion of the posterior dorsum – that is, posterior to the loins and anterior to the tail. Anatomically, the rump corresponds to the sacrum.

The tailhead or dock is the beginning of the tail, where the tail joins the rump. It is known also as the base or root of the tail, and corresponds to the human sacrococcygeal symphysis. In some mammals the tail may be said to consist of the tailbone (meaning the bony column, muscles, and skin) and the skirt (meaning the long hairs growing from the tailbone). In birds, similarly, the tail consists of tailbone and tailfan (tail fan).

Some animals are subjected to docking, the amputation of the tailbone at or near the dock. These include dogs, cats, sheep, pigs, and horses. Humans have a remnant tail, the coccyx, and the human equivalent of docking is coccygectomy.

Usage varies from animal to animal. Birds and cattle are said to have a rump and tailhead. Dogs are said to have a rump and dock. Horses are said to have a croup (sometimes rump), thigh or haunch, buttock, and dock.

== Dogs ==
In some breeds, such as terriers and boxers, it is traditional for tails to be cut off at the dock. This practice, called docking, is banned or restricted in many regions.

== Birds ==
Parts of a bird, rump labeled 10

In bird anatomy, the rump is the body immediately above the tail. The color of plumage on the rump is a characteristic widely used by ornithologists to distinguish between related species, and sometimes also between males and females of the same species. Similarly, the silhouette of the tailfan is a characteristic widely used for purposes of identification, particularly in the field.

Some birds have a food reservoir pouch in the esophagus that is known as a croup (or crop), which should not be confused with the croup (rump) of a horse.

== Horses ==
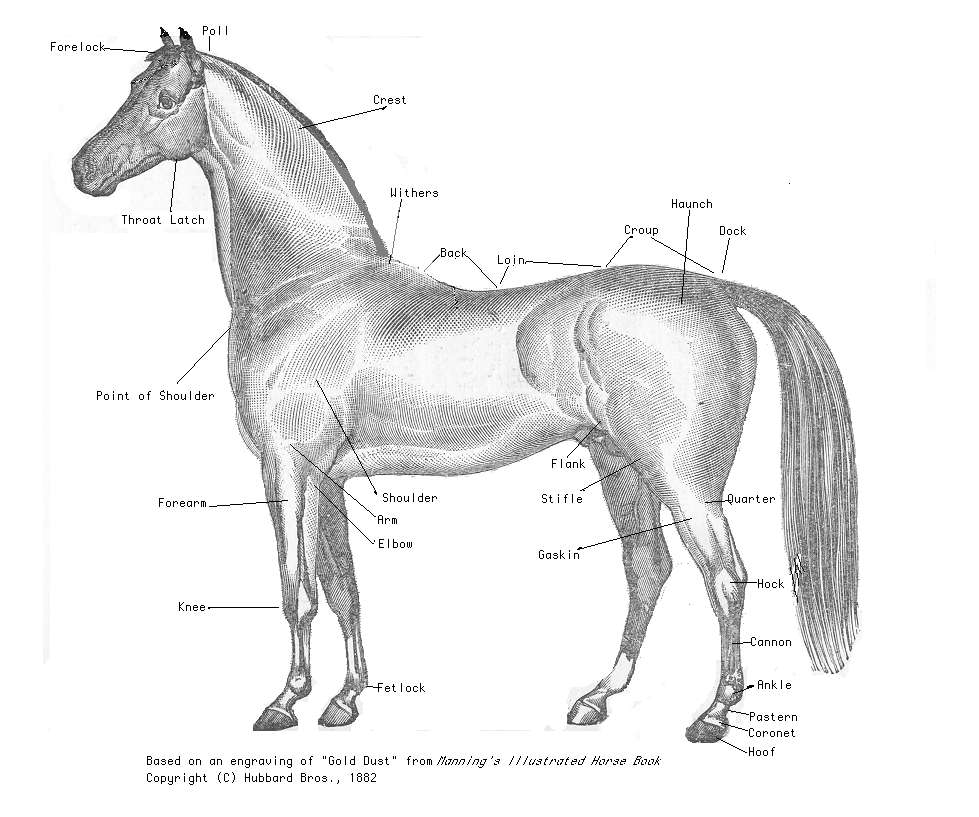
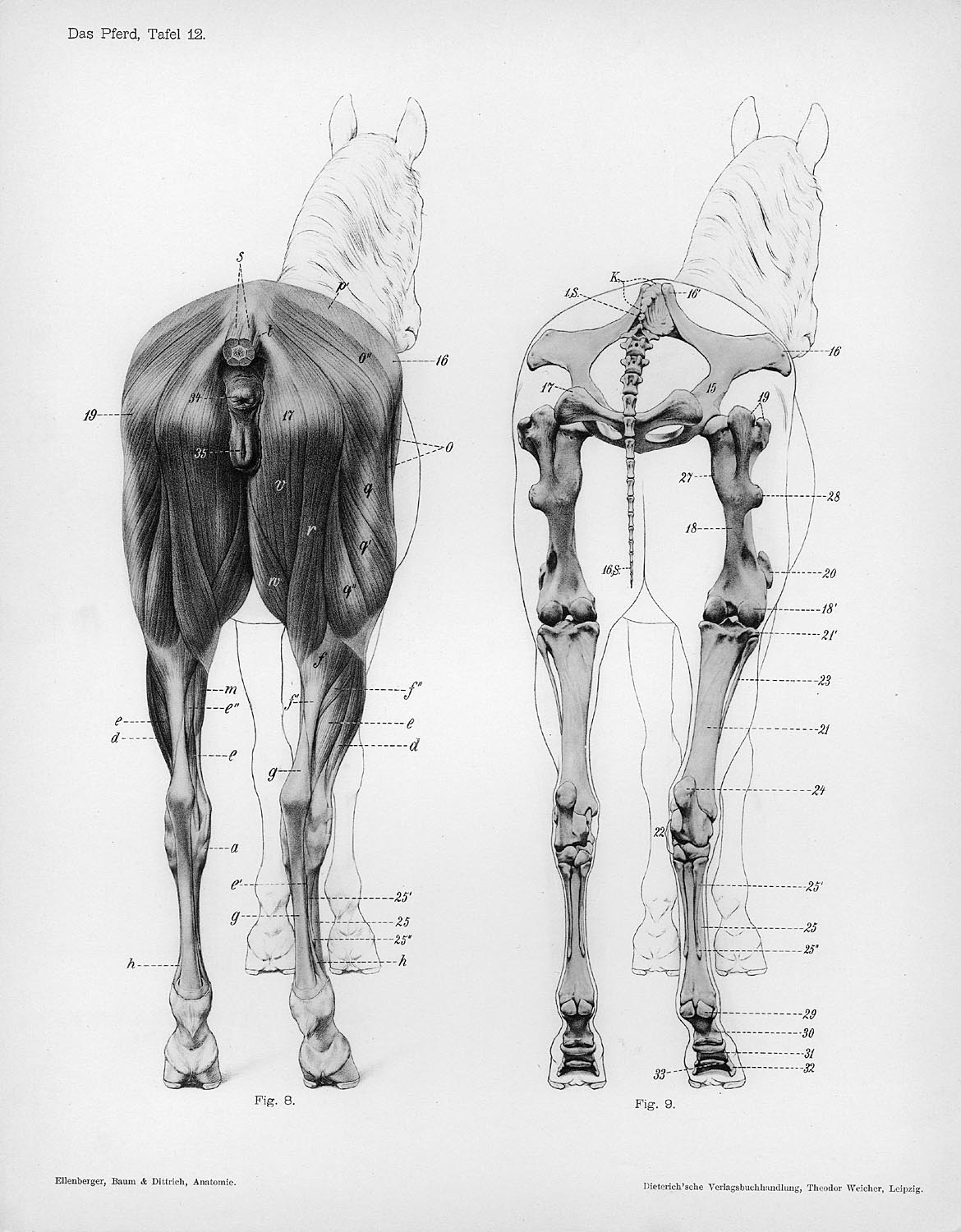
Parts of a horse and rear anatomy

In equine anatomy, the croup refers specifically to the topline of the horse's hindquarters and surrounding musculature, beginning at the hip, extending proximate to the sacral vertebrae and stopping at the dock of the tail (where the coccygeal vertebrae begin). Below the croup is the thigh or haunch. Behind the thigh is the buttock. On horses appearing in parades and other public ceremonies, the croup may be decorated with quarter marks, a grooming pattern made in the horse's hair by applying hair gel or spray, then brushing patches of hair in opposite directions.

Applied to horses, the term "dock" has two additional uses. Its meaning may be extended to either the entire tail minus the skirt (i.e., synonymous with tailbone) or the tailhead only. In other equids, it encompasses most of the tailbone, as most of that portion of the tail does not have long hairs. A lack of long hairs can be natural, as in zebras, donkeys, and the Przewalski horse, or artificial, the result of pulling, trimming, or shaving part of the skirt (see Horse grooming and Tail (horse)).

A sponge used to wash the hairless skin on the underside of the dock and other regions under the tail, protected by the dock, is called a dock sponge. Thus, the meaning of "dock" has been used to refer to the orifices beneath the dock, specifically the anus and vagina, creating a misapprehension that "dock" refers to the anus, as in, a horse's fundamental orifice is its dock.

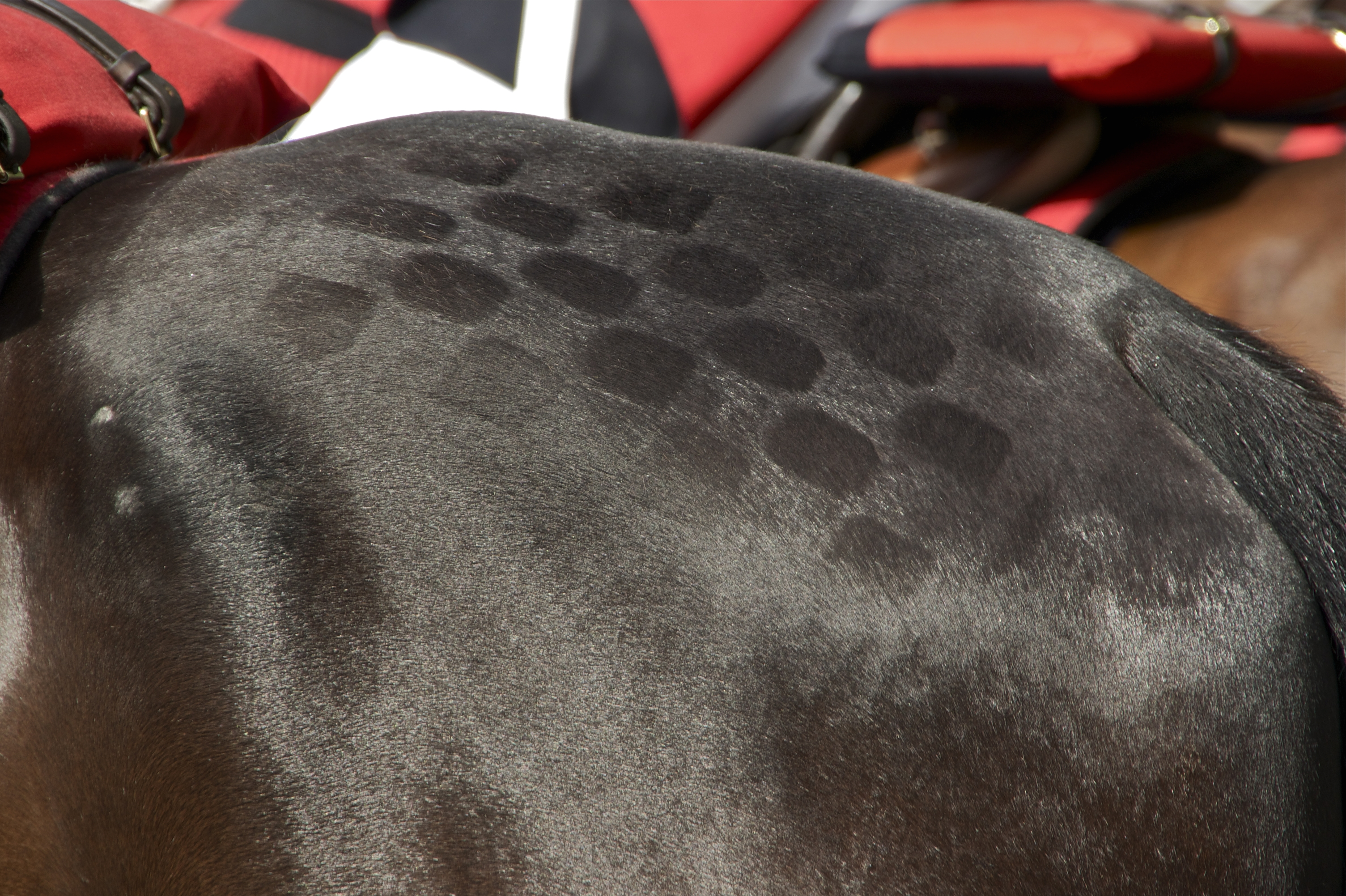
Quarter marks in checkerboard pattern on a horse's croup

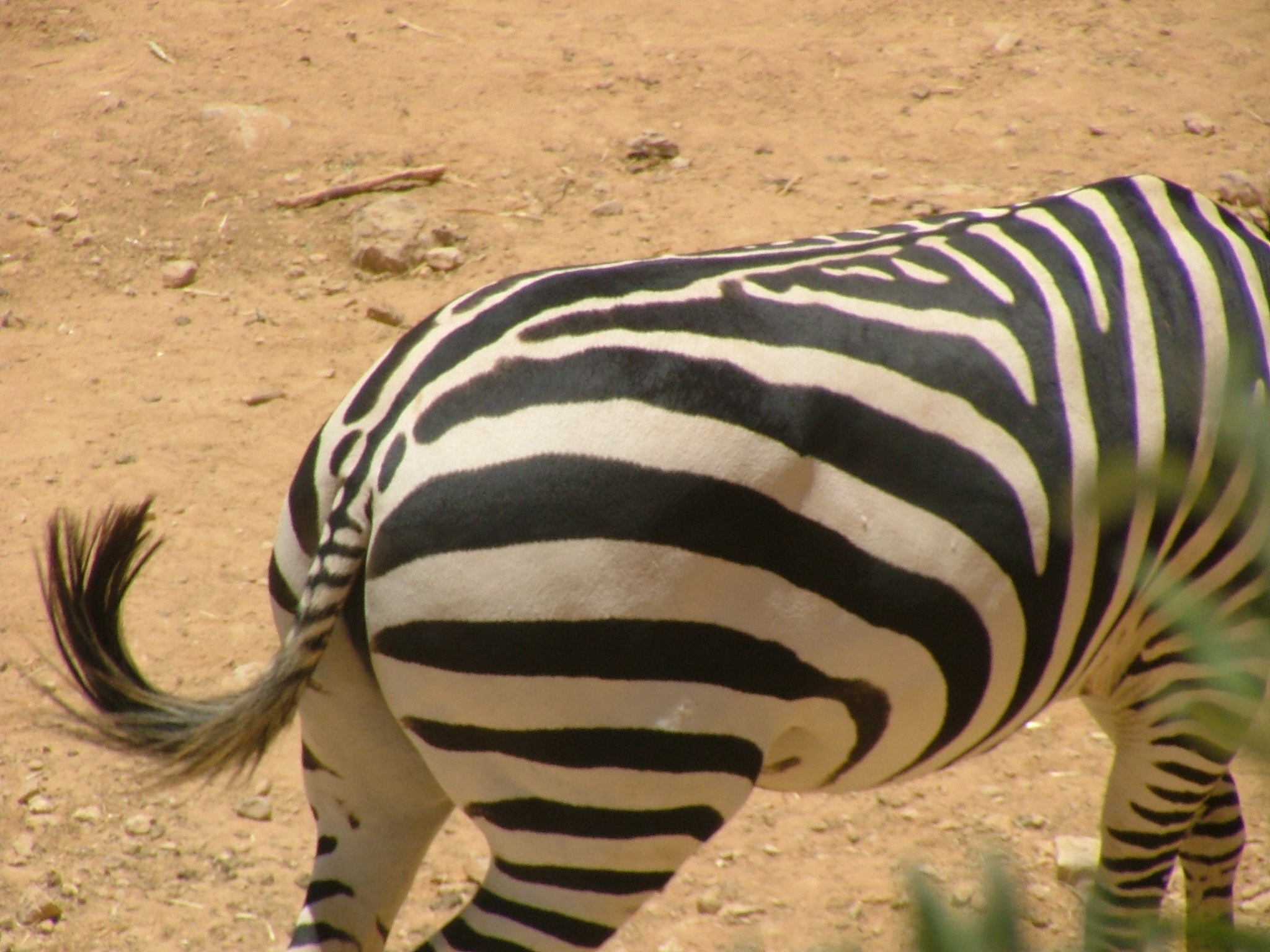
Zebra with "long dock" (short hair portion) with the skirt only near the end of the tail
