= Jean-Henri Magne =

French veterinarian

Jean-Henri Magne (15 July 1804 in Sauveterre-de-Rouergue – 27 August 1885) was a French veterinarian.

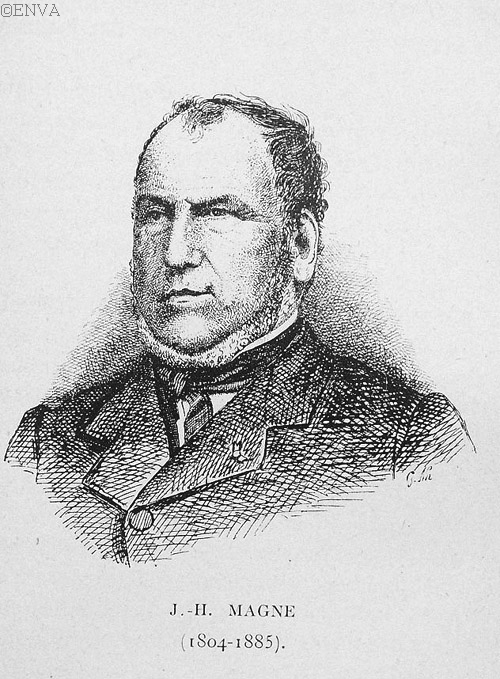
Portrait by Louis Georges Neumann

During his career, he worked as a professor at the École royale vétérinaire de Lyon and at the École nationale vétérinaire d'Alfort, where from 1846, he served as director.

In 1836 he became a member of the Société linnéenne de Lyon, serving as its president in 1841/42. He was also a member of the Académie d'agriculture de France and the Académie vétérinaire de France, being chosen as its president in 1855.

== Published works ==
From 1848 to 1853, he was director of the agricultural journal, Le Moniteur agricole. With mycologist Claude Casimir Gillet, he collaborated on Nouvelle flore française (1873), a botanical work that was issued over several editions. He was the author of the following writings:

- Principes d'agriculture et d'hygiène vétérinaire, 1843 – Principles of agriculture and veterinary health.
- Choix des vaches laitières, 1850 – Selection of dairy cows.
- Rapport sur les progrès de la médecine vétérinaire depuis vingt-cinq ans, 1867 – Report on the progress of veterinary medicine for the past twenty-five years.
- Hygiène vétérinaire appliquée (third edition in 1867) – Applied veterinary health.
