= List of African horse breeds =

This is a list of the horse breeds usually considered to have developed in the African continent. Some may have complex or obscure histories, so inclusion here does not necessarily imply that a breed is predominantly or exclusively African.

Other names printed in bold are native labels of the breed.

English name	Other names	Reported from	Notes	Image
Abyssinian		Ethiopia		
Bahr el-Ghazal	Kréda; Ganaston	Chad	regional variant of the Dongola	
Baladi Egyptian		Egypt		
Bale		Ethiopia		
Bandiagara		Mali, Niger	Dongola-Barb cross	
Barb	Berber: **ⴰⴳⵎⴰⵔ ⴰⵎⴰⵣⵉⵖ**, Arabic: حصان **بربري**, Barbary	Algeria, Mali, Mauritania, Morocco, Senegal, Tunisia		
Basotho Pony		Lesotho		
Beledougou	**Bélédougou**, Banamba	Mali		
Bhirum Pony	Nigerian Pony	Nigeria		
Bobo		Burkina Faso		
Boerperd		Botswana, South Africa		
Borana		Ethiopia		
Bornu		Nigeria	regional variant of the Dongola	
Calvinia		South Africa	extinct	
Cape Harness	Afrikaans: **Bolandse Waperd** or **Bolandse Tuigperd**	South Africa	extinct	
Cape Horse	Afrikaans: Boerperd	South Africa	extinct	
Cheval de Nioro		Mali		
Djerma	Aréwa, Bagazan, Ganja, Manga, Gobir, Ader	Niger	Dongola-Barb cross	
Dombi		Mali		
Dongola		Chad, Eritrea, Mali, Sudan		
English Halbblut Horse		South Africa		
European Warmblood		South Africa		
Fleuve	Wolof: **Naru Gor**	Senegal		
Foutanké	Fouta	Senegal		
Hamdani	Arabic: **االحمداني**	Tunisia		
Hausa	Haoussa	Mali, Niger, Nigeria	regional variant of the Dongola	
Hodh		Mali, Mauritania		
Horro		Ethiopia		
Kafa		Ethiopia		
Koto-Koli Pony		Benin, Togo		
Kundudo		Ethiopia	feral	
Poney des Mogods	Arabic: **خيل مقعد**	Tunisia		
M'Par	Mpar, Cheval de Cayor	Senegal		
M'Bayar		Senegal		
Mossi		Burkina Faso	Dongola-Barb cross	
Namaqua Pony		South Africa	extinct	
Namib Desert Horse	Afrikaans: **Namib Woestyn Perd**	Namibia	feral	
Namib Horse		South Africa		
Nefza Pony		Tunisia	extinct	
Nooitgedachter	Nooitgedachtperd, Nooitgedacht Pony, Nooitgedacht Horse	Botswana, South Africa		
Ogaden	Also called Wilwal	Ethiopia		
Poney du Logone		Chad		
Selale		Ethiopia		
South African Miniature Horse	Afrikaans: **Suid-afrikaanse Miniatuur Perd**	South Africa		
South African Sporting Horse		South Africa		
South African Warm Blood	Afrikaans: **Suid-afrikaanse Warmbloed**	South Africa		
Sahel		Mali		
Somali Pony	Somali: **Nugali**	Somalia		
Songhoï	Songhaq	Mali	Dongola-Barb cross	
Sudan Country-Bred	Sudanese Country-Bred	Sudan		
Sulebawa		Nigeria		
Tawleed		Sudan		
Torodi		Niger		
Tswana		Botswana		
Vlaamperd		South Africa		
West African Barb		Algeria, Chad, Ghana, Mauritania, Senegal, Tunisia		
West African Dongola		Central African Republic, Sudan		
West African Pony		Ghana		
Western Sudan Pony		Sudan		
Yagha		Burkina Faso	Dongola-Barb cross	
