= Horses in Sudan =

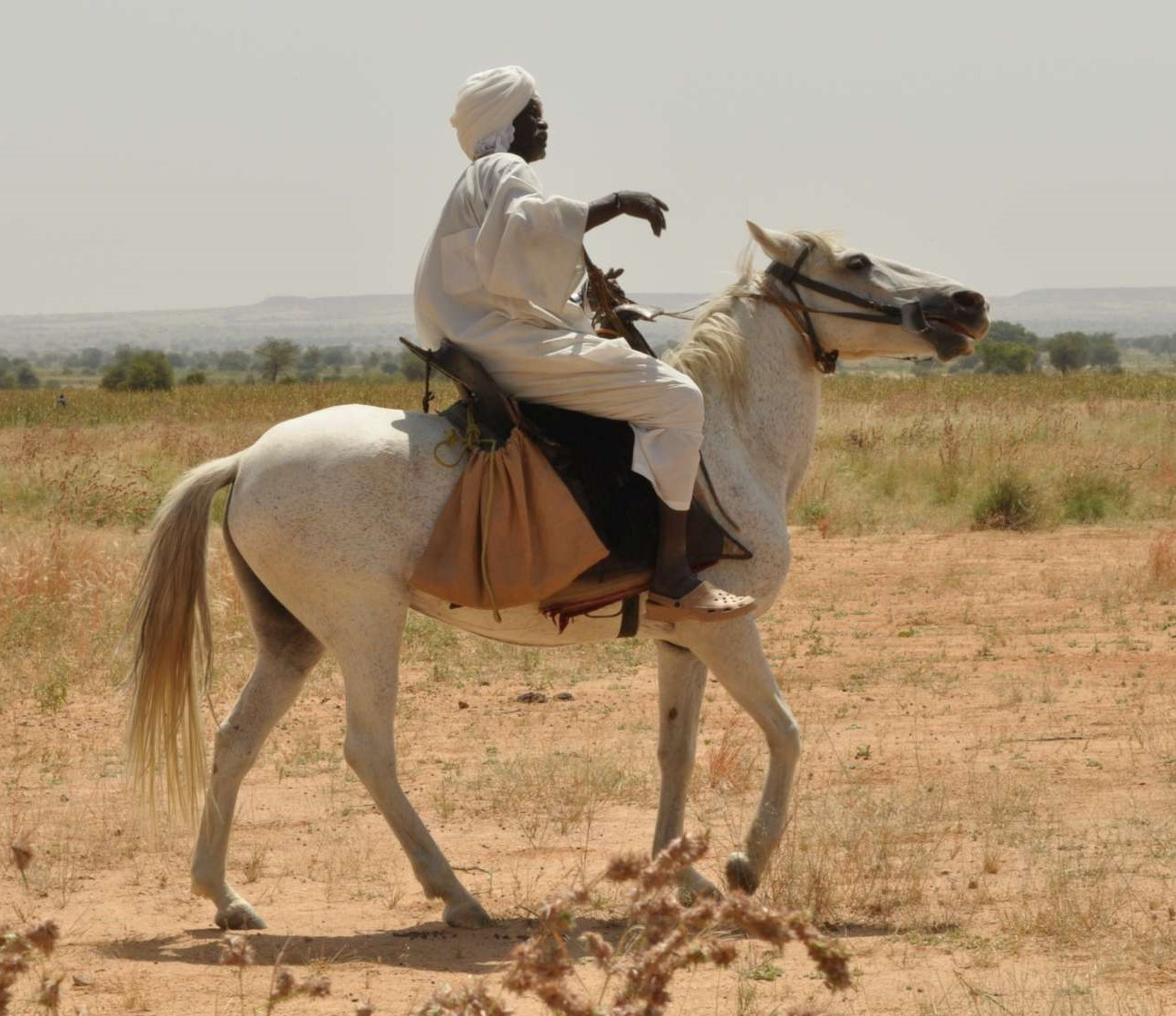
Sudanese horseman in Darfur, 2010

Sudan's equestrian history is deeply rooted, with evidence of horse use dating back to around 1000 BC. Contrary to common belief, horses were present in Sudan long before the arrival of nomadic Muslim tribes. They hold cultural significance, particularly among tribes in the Darfur region, where horse racing has been practiced since the 16th century. British colonial influence introduced horse racing, polo, and tent pegging in 1929, which persisted after Sudan gained independence in 1956. Efforts to improve horse breeding included importing Thoroughbreds from England in 1944, but this impacted local breeds that have adapted to the environment. Sudan faces equine diseases like African horse sickness and piroplasmosis.

The DAD-IS database lists four horse breeds reported by Sudan: the Dongola or Dongolawi, the Sudanese Country-Bred, the Tawleed and the Western Sudan Pony. The horse population of Sudan (including Sudan and present-day South Sudan) was probably around 700,000 individuals in 2009. Epidemics of horse sickness and drought represent obstacles to its expansion.

Horses are primarily used for transportation and traction in Sudan, with limited leisure applications. They play a historical role in warfare, prized for their agility and speed, though modern conflicts have altered their battlefield significance. Culturally, horses symbolise prestige and authority, celebrated in festivals and events, especially horse racing. Despite betting being prohibited by Islamic tradition, racing remains a popular sport, with Sudanese jockeys well-regarded for their courage.

== History ==
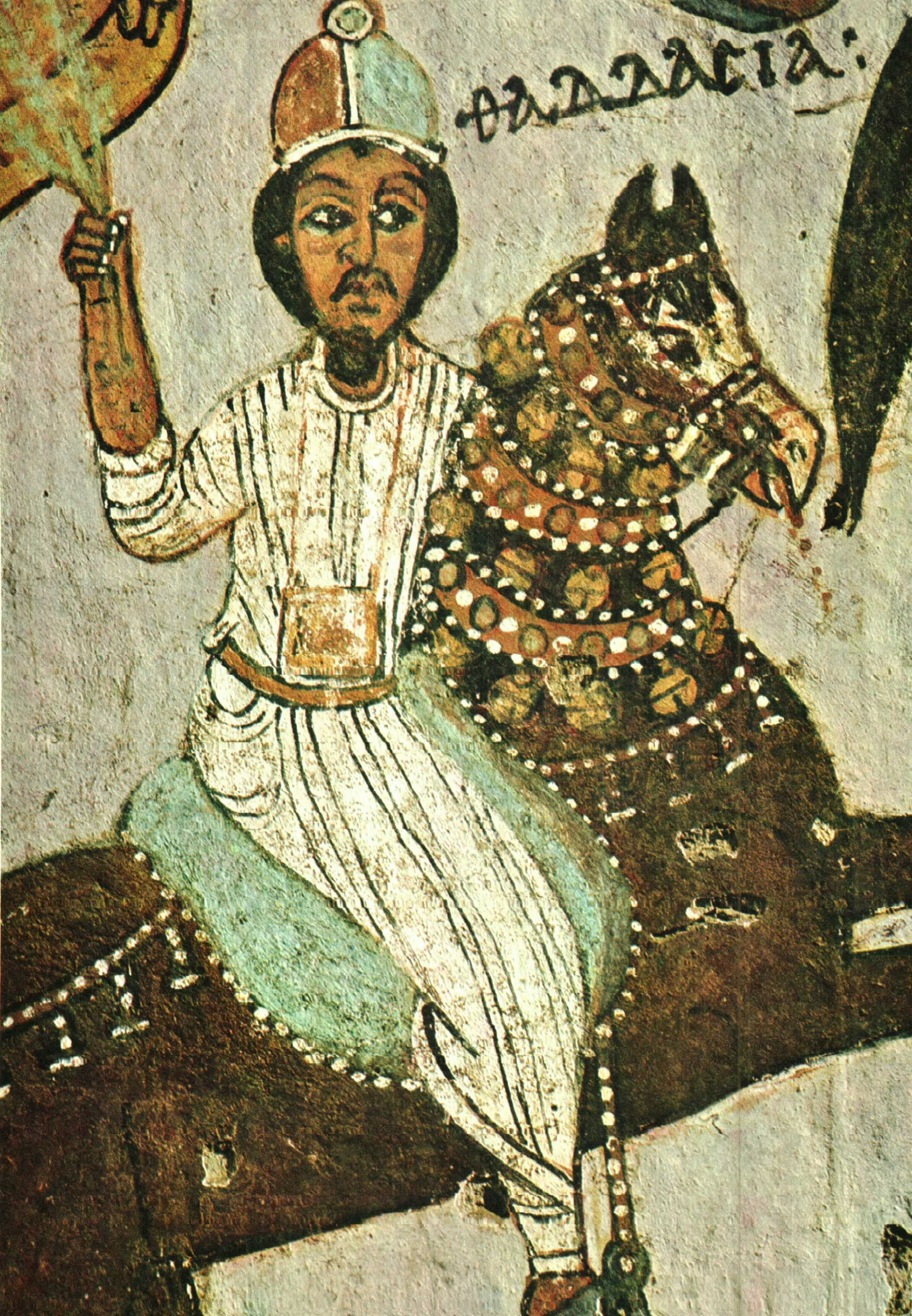
Magi from a nativity scene in Faras, Nubia. Note the elaborate horse harness.

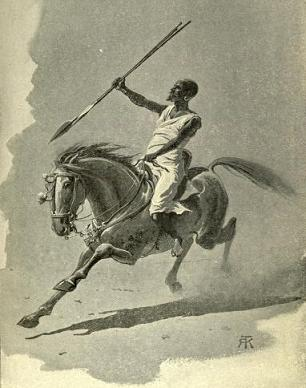
Rizeigat warrior

Equestrian practices are probably very old on Sudanese territory, as evidenced by the discovery of the remains of a Nubian chariot horse, dated to around 1000 BC. According to Mamoun A. Mekki, general secretary of the Sudanese Equestrian Federation in 1994, the horse was in fact introduced by the Nubians around 2000 BC. Contrary to widespread belief, it was certainly present on the territory of Sudan well before the arrival of nomadic Muslim tribes from the Sahara. The use of cavalry seems historically rare, camelry being preferred, until agility during the battle became critical.

The horse constitutes a cultural heritage, particularly in the Darfur region, among the Missairiyah and the Rizeigat tribes. It appears that horse racing has been practiced in Darfur since 16th century. During the 20th century, a policy of improving breeding was put in place with the support of local tribes, who participated in the establishment of Thoroughbreds, particularly in the Khartoum region. The English imported horse racing in 1929, and built a racecourse in Khartoum, at the confluence of the Blue Nile and the White Nile. They imported other equestrian practices then unknown to the Sudanese, such as polo and tent pegging. While they had no intention of teaching equestrian sport to the Sudanese, this practice survived the colonial period, equestrian sport being in full development during the country's independence in 1956. According to Ahmed Mekki Abdu, first Governor of Khartoum after independence, the English re-sold their horses to the Sudanese before their departure, allowing the maintenance of large stables sometimes numbering dozens of horses.

The veterinary authorities imported Thoroughbreds from England from 1944, with the idea of "improving" the local herd and making Sudan a country exporting horses to Iraq, Egypt, Jordan and Nigeria, whose officials enjoy seeing tribal horse shows. A breeding centre was created in Nyala, capable of receiving 10 to 90 mares every day. This centre became the main supplier of racehorses to Khartoum, and imported 400 to 500 of these animals annually until 1974. Arabian horses were also imported at this time. This breeding is established to the detriment of local breeds, although they are better adapted to their biotope.

The environmental and ecological crisis (desertification of Darfur) impacts domestic animals as much as human beings, reducing horse patrols, polo, and racing.

=== Warfare ===
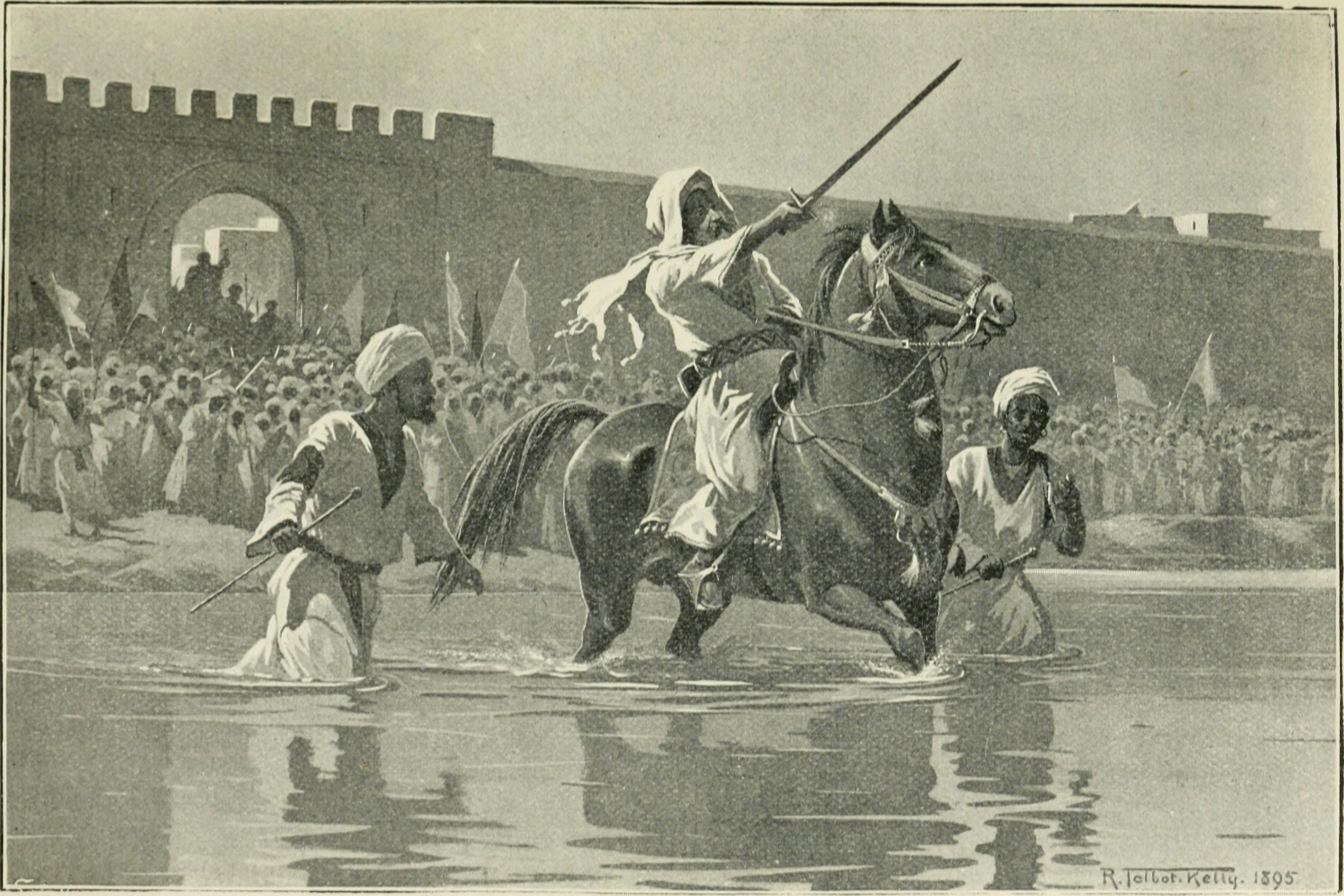
Fighting and serving the dervishes, 1879–1895

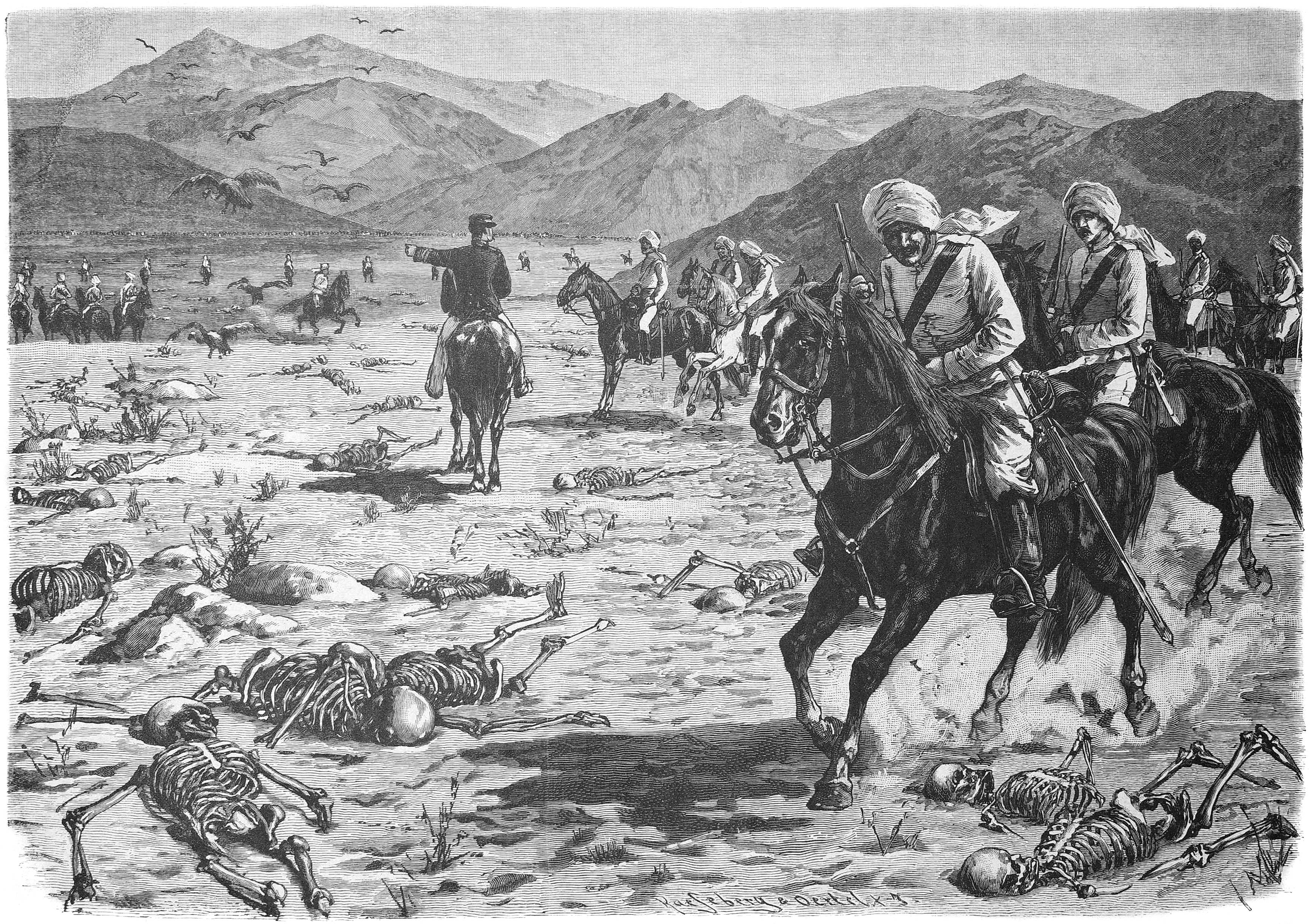
Battle of Omdurman drawing by Fritz Bergen

Horses were used for warfare in the central Sudan region since the 9th century, where they were considered "the most precious commodity following the slave." The first conclusive evidence of horses playing a major role in the warfare of West Africa dates to the 11th century when the region was controlled by the Almoravids, a Muslim Berber dynasty. During the 13th and 14th centuries, cavalry became an important factor in the area. This coincided with the introduction of larger breeds of horse and the widespread adoption of saddles and stirrups.

Mounted warfare was a prominent feature of Sudanese military strategies. Horses served as cavalry, offering not only mobility but also the ability to charge into enemy lines with force. Cavalry units were known for their speed and manoeuvrability, making them a formidable presence on the battlefield. They played a crucial role in various campaigns and conflicts, contributing to Sudan's military successes. Horses held symbolic significance in Sudanese warfare. They were not only tools of combat but also symbols of victory and prestige. Victorious leaders often paraded on horseback, showcasing their authority and triumph. Horses became a source of pride and a representation of power in Sudanese culture. The use of horses in Sudan's military history also extended to trade and exchange. Sudan imported horses from North Africa and the Western Sahara, often exchanging them for slaves. This trade had significant economic and military implications for the region, highlighting the multifaceted role of horses in Sudanese society.

During the 18th and 19th centuries, horses were extensively used in inter-tribal conflicts in Sudan. Their agility and speed made them invaluable assets on the battlefield, allowing for swift manoeuvres and rapid charges. Horses became a common sight in these battles, as various tribes vied for power and territory within the region.

While horses once dominated the battlefield in Sudan, modern conflicts have witnessed changes in military technology and tactics. The role of horses in warfare has evolved, with mechanised vehicles and modern weaponry largely replacing them. Still, organised armed fighters on horseback are occasionally seen. The best-known current examples are the Janjaweed, militia groups seen in the Darfur region of Sudan, who became notorious for their attacks upon unarmed civilian populations in the Darfur conflict. Many nations still maintain small numbers of mounted military units for certain types of patrol and reconnaissance duties in extremely rugged terrain, including the conflict in Afghanistan.

== Breeds ==
Sudan has the largest population of domestic livestock (cattle, goats, camels, donkeys, sheep, etc.) in all of Africa, with the domestic donkey being much more present than the horse. Based on figures provided by the Sudanese government in 2009, R. Trevor Wilson estimates, in his study of domestic livestock in Sudan (including present-day South Sudan), that there are 784,000 horses in the country in 2009. The Delachaux guide puts forward a figure of around 20,000 horses in Sudan in 2014.

The indigenous horses of Sudan were of Barb type, quite small, with a light frame. In the twenty-first century, four horse breeds are reported by Sudan: the Dongola, the Sudan Country-Bred, the Tawleed and the Western Sudan Pony or Gharbawi.

The Dongola, named for the Dongola province of Sudan, is an African riding breed of Barb type, possibly influenced by Arabs in the past. It is distributed in northern Sudan, in western Eritrea, and in many West African nations. It has many regional variants such as the West African Dongola and the Bahr-el-Ghazal of Chad. West African Dongolawi breeds include the Mossi, Yagha, Bandiagara, Songhaq, Djerma, and Nigerian. Known for its convex profile, the Dongola horse is hardy and is used for riding, traction, and pack work.

The Sudanese Country-Bred originated in the early twentieth century through a government programme aimed at improving the breed. Local Barb-type mares, mainly from Dongola and Gharbaui populations, were bred with Arab and Thoroughbred stallions, often at the Nyala stud farm in South Darfur. Although the resulting crossbred horses were larger, they lost some of the local qualities, such as hardiness and water endurance. By the 1950s or 1960s, most local horses were affected by this process. In 1994, their population was around 65,000. The breed's conservation status is currently considered "not at risk," according to FAO in 2007 and the DAD-IS database in 2023. These horses are primarily used for riding, with bay being the most common coat colour.

The Tawleed originated in the Khartoum region from crossbreeding of the Sudanese Country-Bred with imported blood horses, especially Thoroughbreds.

The Gharbaui was developed though a government-led "improvement" program in the twentieth century at the Nyala stud farm in South Darfur. Local mares of Barb type were cross-bred with Arab and Thoroughbred stallions, resulting in larger but less hardy horses. By the 1950s or 1960s, few remained unaffected by this cross-breeding process. In 1994, their population was estimated at 8000–10,000. It is a small horse, standing around 140–145 cm at the withers, resembling the Barb in many ways, particularly in its hardiness and endurance. The legs often have poor conformation. It has a convex profile; coat colour is commonly grey but can also be bay or chestnut.

== Diseases and parasitism ==
Like other countries in North Africa and the Middle East, the Khartoum region is hit by epidemics of African horse sickness, which causes high horse mortality. Majority of the Sudanese horses studied were, directly or indirectly, exposed to this virus. Piroplasmosis is also present, with 35.9% of horses and donkeys tested in 2013 being or having been parasitised. Parasitization by Babesia caballi and Theileria equi is common in 2008, including present-day South Sudan.

== Usage and culture ==
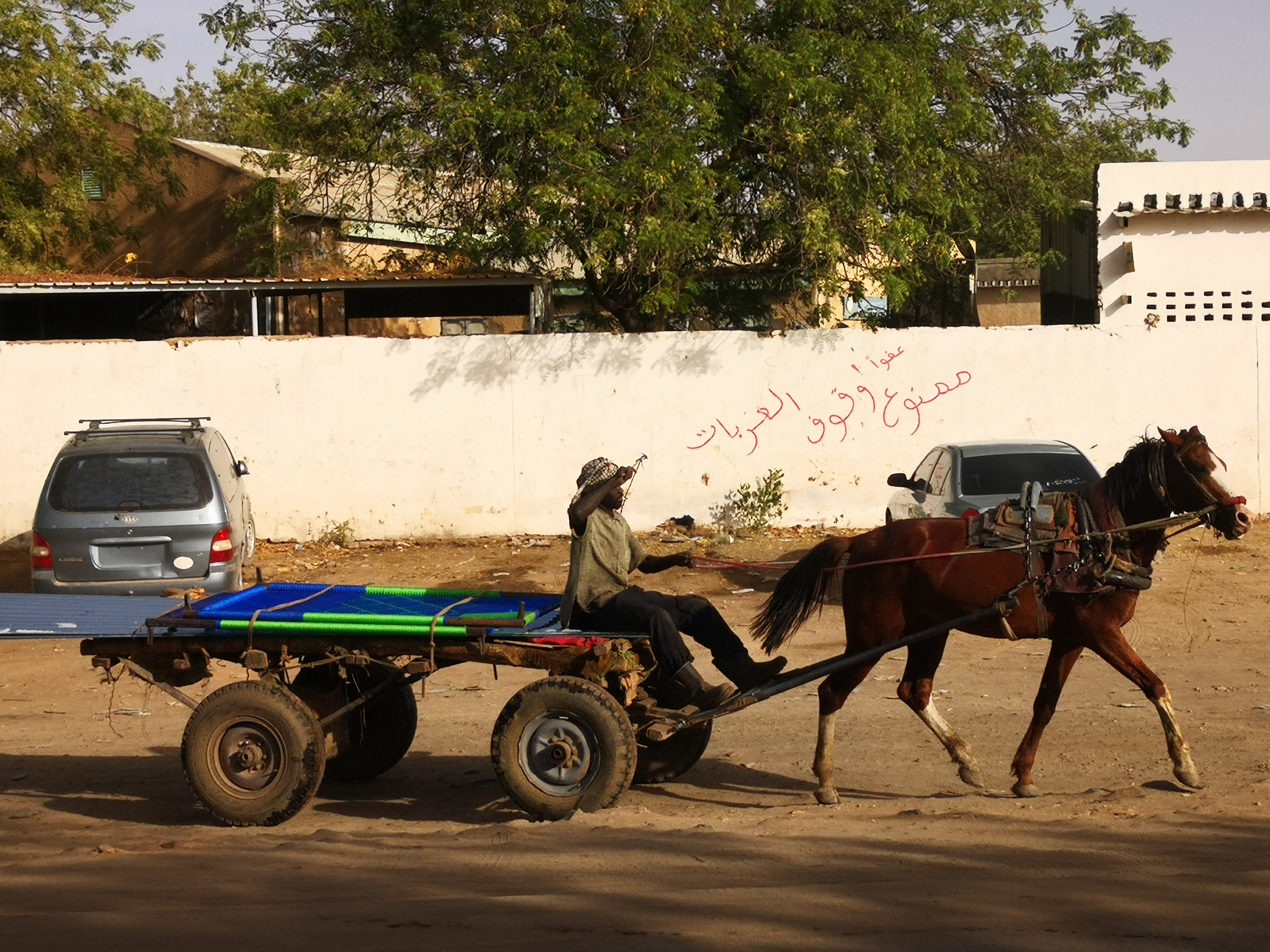
Working horse

The horse is mainly used as a means of transport, traction, and more rarely as a leisure animal. Horse riding is practiced in rural areas of Sudan for transportation purposes. On the other hand, horse was not used, or only very little, as an agricultural aid in Central Sudan. The vast majority of Sudanese horses are used as working animals, with the exception of a minority of sport horses. In addition to its horse racing, Sudan is known for its tent pegging competitions, imported by the British.

The use of mounted police to secure the streets at night, inspired by British traditions, continued throughout the 20th century, before disappearing at the start of the following century.

=== Horse racing ===
As of 2014, Horse races are still organised in the Khartoum region. Horse racing is a popular and vibrant tradition in Sudan. These events not only showcase the speed and agility of horses but also provide opportunities for social gatherings and cultural expression.

Betting is prohibited in horse racing, in accordance with Islamic laws. The racing season takes place from October to June, due to the heat. People suspected of betting despite the ban are regularly arrested. Sudanese jockeys, renowned for their courage and combativeness, are recruited by racing stables in Gulf countries. In 2012, the African Union proposed the organisation of horse races in Nyala, in South Darfur, as a factor of cohesion and peace between peoples. Maintaining the races also supports cohesion and morale among the Sudanese population of Khartoum since the secession of South Sudan.

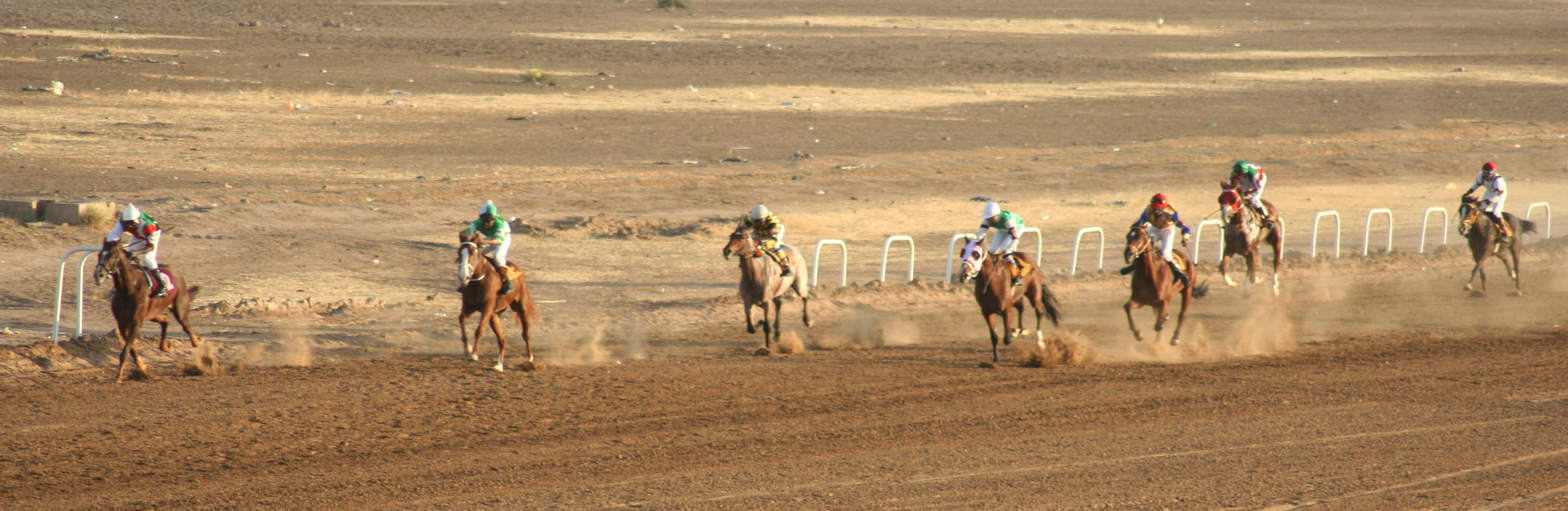
Horse racing in Khartoum, in 2007

=== Cultural significance ===
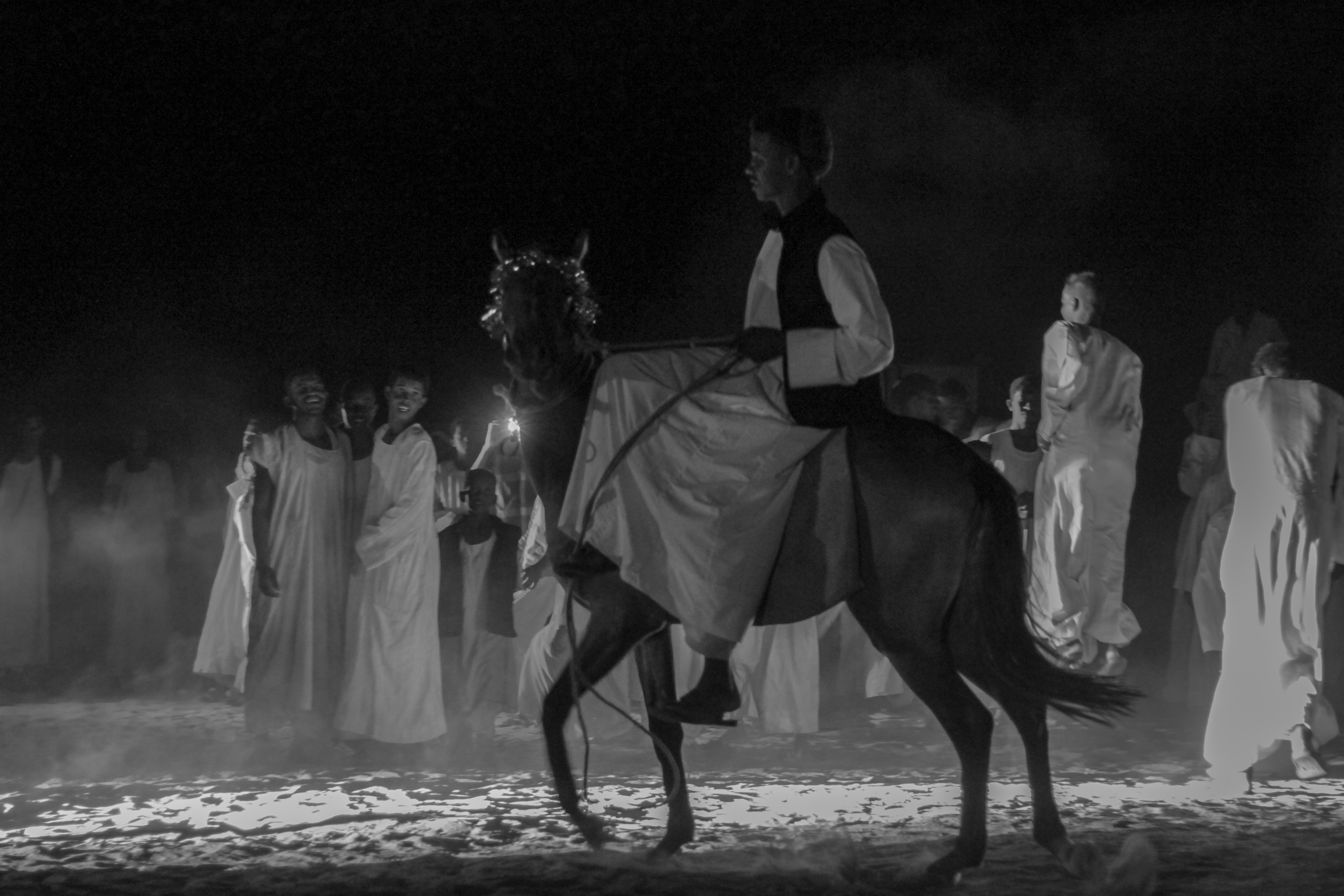
Dancing horses

Sudan's horse culture dates back centuries, with horses being highly prized and associated with wealth and power. Particularly, ethnic groups in the Darfur region, such as the Missairiyah and Rizeigat tribes, have preserved their historic connection with horses, considering them a part of their identity and heritage.

Horses are a symbol of power in Sudanese culture. Only the wealthy and powerful could own horses, and rulers like the Soso king Soumaoro Kanté showcased their authority through impressive cavalries.

According to researcher Humphrey J. Fisher, of the University of London (1974), traditional festivals and ceremonies seem to constitute the main use of the horse in Sudan, as well as the first vector of transmission of knowledge in terms of horsemanship and horse care. The major limit to equestrian practices seems to lie in the cost and availability of equestrian equipment. There is also a restriction due to a stream of radical Islam, which considers ownership of a horse unacceptable, and the practice of horse riding suspicious.

Sudanese culture celebrates horses through various festivals and events. The horse is often mentioned in traditional Sudanese poems and songs. On the occasion of festivals, particularly weddings, riders accompany the processions. The Sudanese also make numerous references to the important role of the horse in the Koran and Islamic conquests. The horse has always represented a prestigious gift or tribute.
