= Namib Desert Horse =

Breed of horse

Namib Desert horse
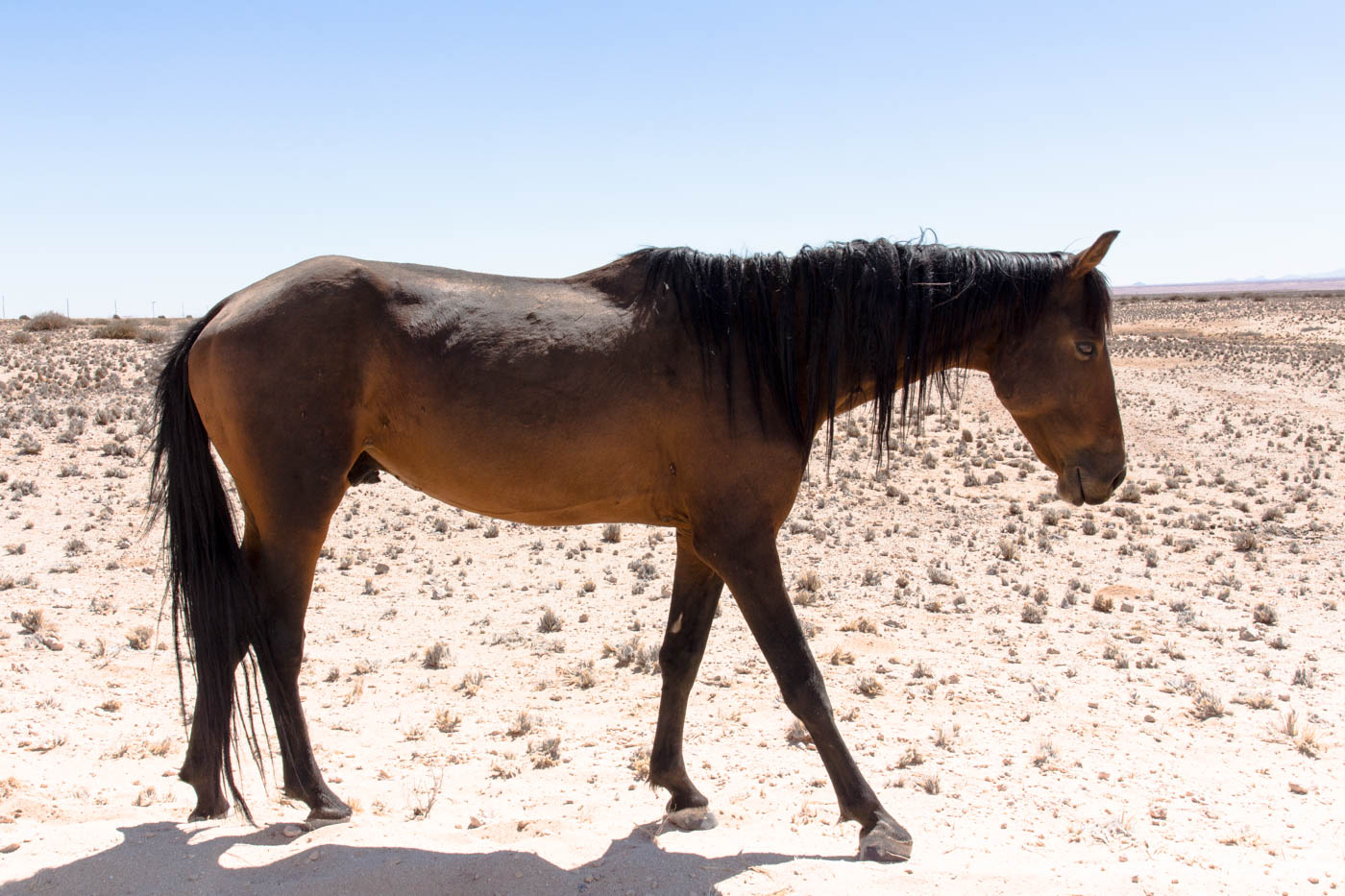

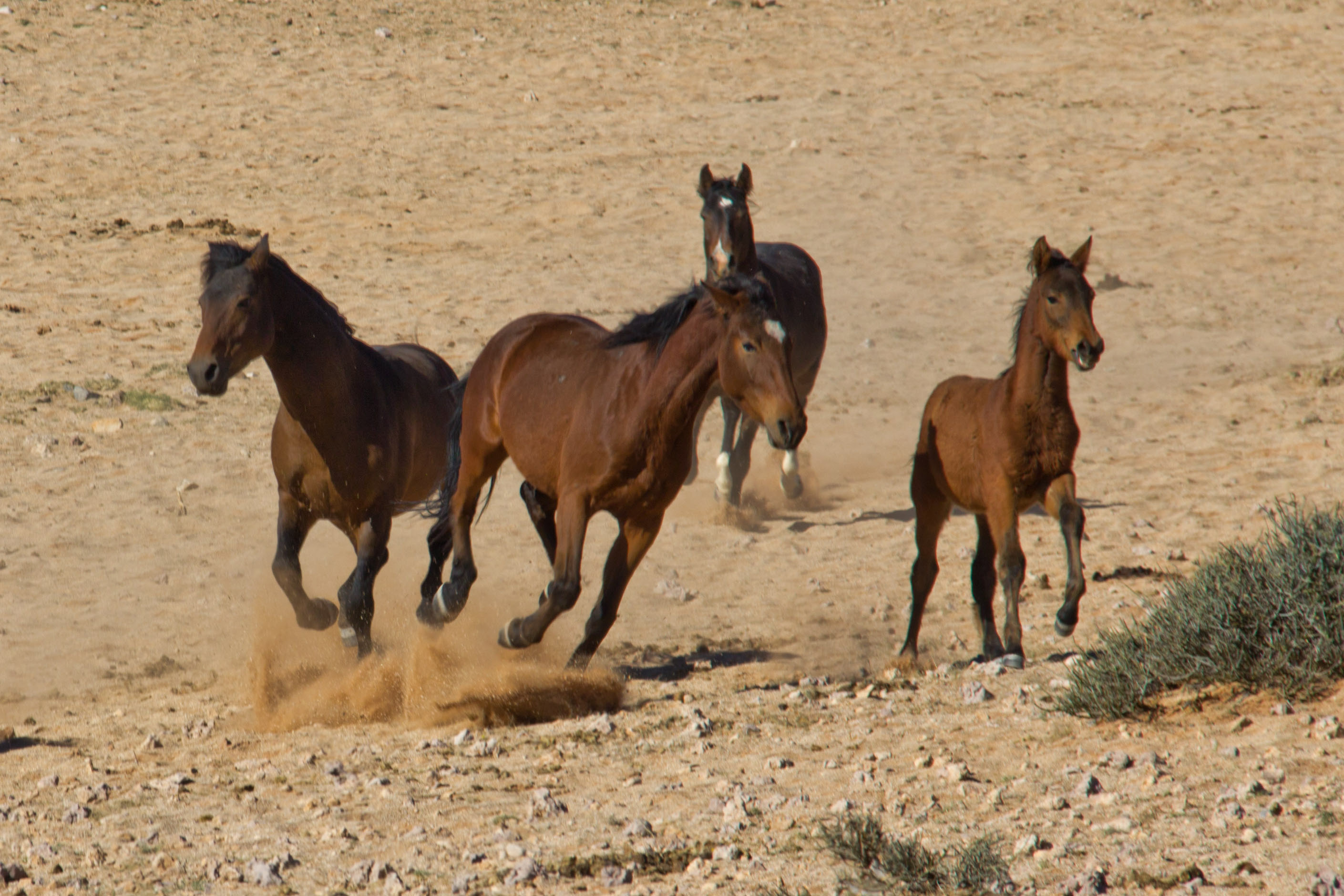
- Country of origin: Namibia

Traits
- Distinguishing features: Rare, feral horse; hardy and athletic

The Namib Desert horse (Afrikaans: Namib Woestyn Perd) is a feral horse found in the Namib Desert of Namibia. It is one of the two feral herd of horses ( the other being the Kundudo horses from Ethiopia) residing in Africa, with a population ranging between 90 and 150. The Namib Desert horse is athletic in appearance, resembling the European light riding horses from which it probably descends, and usually dark in color. Despite the harsh environment in which they live, the horses are generally in good condition, except during times of extreme drought. The horses have been the subject of several population studies, which have given significant insight into their population dynamics and ability to survive in desert conditions.

The origin of the Namib Desert horse is unclear, though several theories have been put forward. Genetic tests have been performed, although none to date have completely verified their origin. The most likely ancestors of the horses are a mix of riding horses and cavalry horses, many from German breeding programs, released from various farms and camps in the early 20th century, especially during World War I. Whatever their origin, the horses eventually congregated in the Garub Plains, near Aus, Namibia, the location of a man-made water source. They were generally ignored by humans, except for the periodic threat of eradication, due to the possibility that they were destroying native herbivore habitat, until the 1980s. In 1984, the first aerial survey of the population was made, and in 1986, their traditional grazing land was incorporated into the Namib-Naukluft Park. At several points, some horses have been removed from the herd, including the removal and sale of over one-third of the population in 1992. Since the early 1990s, close records of the population have been kept, and studies have been performed to determine the horses' effect on their environment. Despite being considered an exotic species within the park, they are allowed to remain due to their ties to the country's history and draw as a tourist attraction.

== Characteristics ==
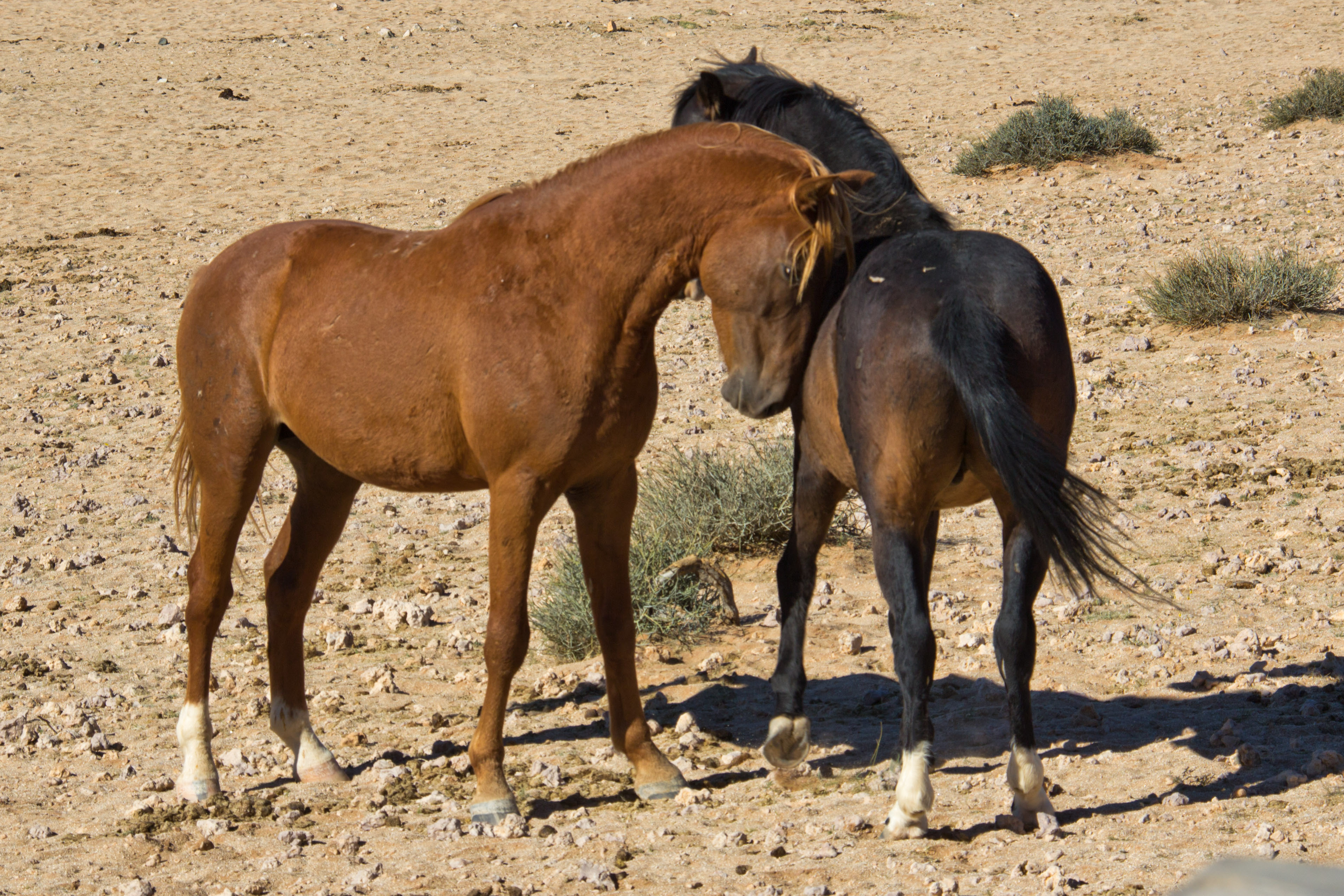
Two horses showing typical dark coloration

The most common color of the Namib Desert horse is bay, although there are a few chestnut and brown horses. There are even a smaller number of black horses but these are exceptional. The gene for gray does not occur in the breed. There are many individuals with dorsal striping but no zebra stripes. No other colors have been recorded. The Namib Desert horses are athletic, muscular, clean-limbed, and strong boned. They are short-backed with oblique shoulders and good withers. The horses have the appearance of well-bred riding horses in head, skin, and coat. Overall, they have good conformation, with few deformities. Club hooves are occasionally seen in foals, likely due to trauma to the hoof while traveling long distances.

Scientists studying the horses rate their body condition on a scale of one (excellent) to five (very poor), based mainly on estimated weight and muscle tone. The horses tend to remain in above average condition, despite the harsh environment in which they live, with stallions generally averaging better condition then mares. During severe droughts, the average body score decreases, but even then horses are found with moderate body scores and the entire population is never in very poor condition. The condition of the horses is directly correlated to rainfall, through a correlation to available forage, though temperature, distance between forage and water and individual energy expenditures also play a role. Studies during the 1990s found no evidence of equine disease among the population and few external parasites. Investigations of carcasses found four internal nematode parasites present (strongyles, small and large pinworms and ascarids), as well as the larvae of botflies.

=== Behavior and ecology ===
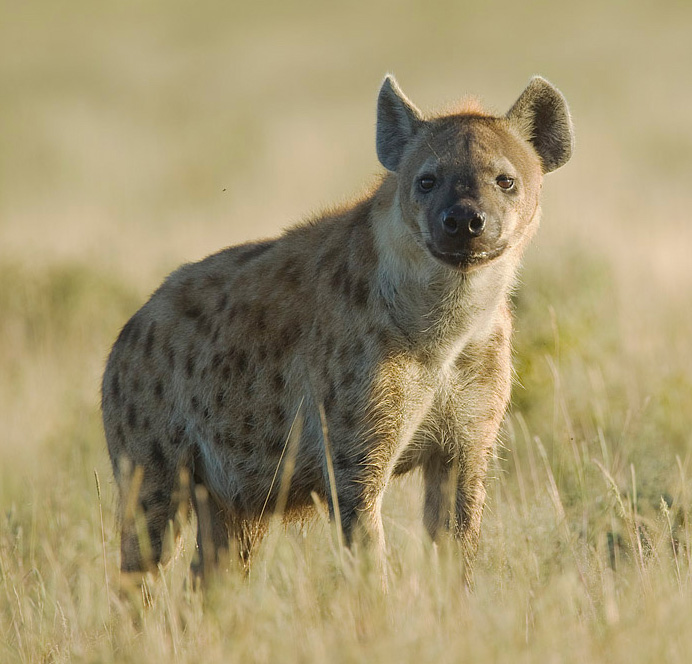
Spotted hyenas are known to prey on young Namib Desert horses

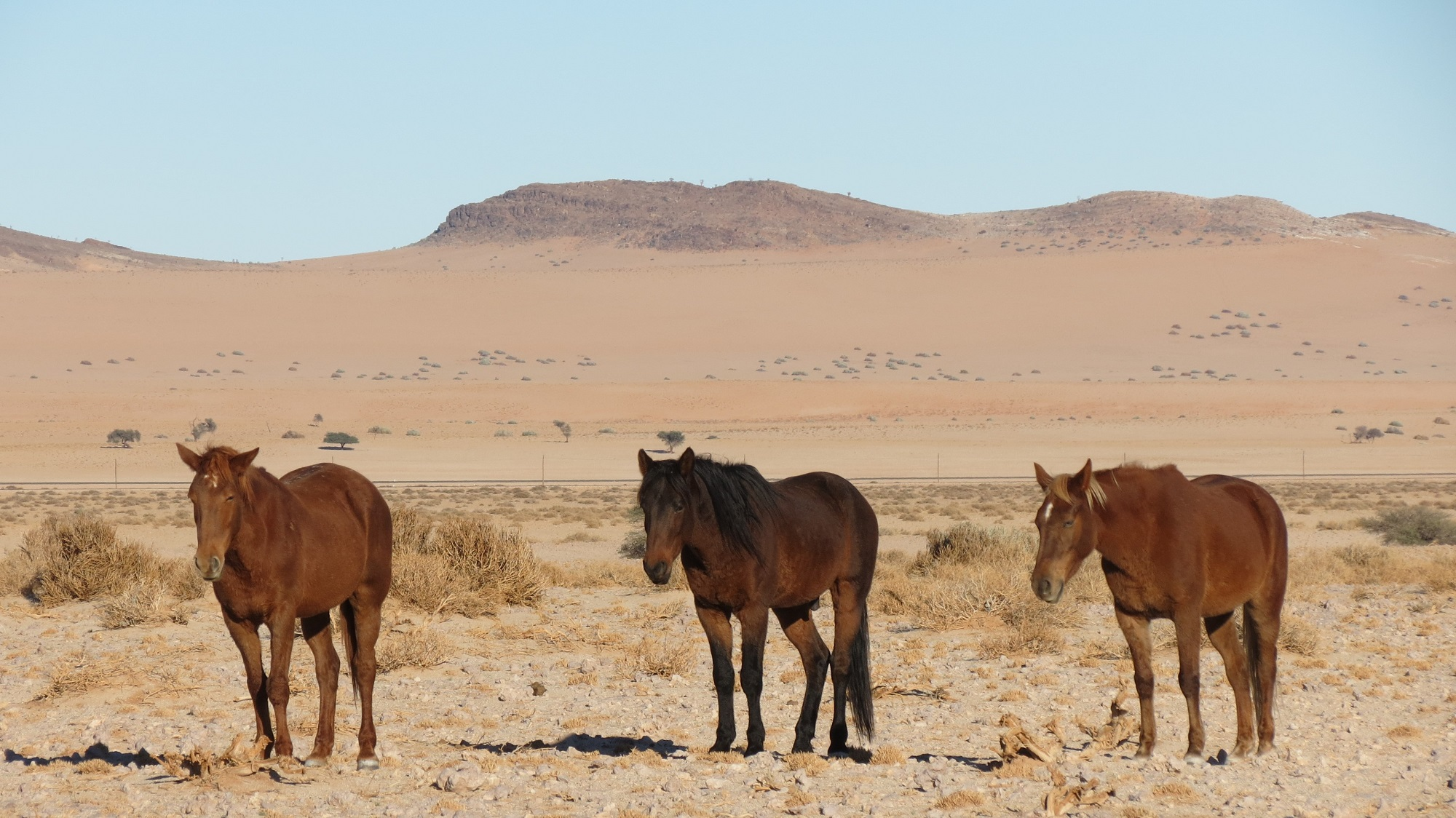
Namib Desert horses near Garub

The home range of the Namib Desert horse reaches north in the Namib Desert to the Koichab River, usually dry, and west to the Great Escarpment. Bands of horses range together, consisting of as few as two animals, although there are generally more. In observations between 1993 and 2003, between six and eleven bands were identified, including a mixture of bachelor herds, breeding groups and co-operating stallion groups (groups with more than one stallion that share breeding duties). The Namib Desert horse travels extensively, searching for food, water and shelter from the climate and insects. A 1994 study found that they have an average home range of 13 square miles (34 km^{2}), although not all of that is traversed each day. They must cover considerable distances, as much as 15 to 20 kilometres (9 to 12 mi) between the few existing water sources and the best grazing sources. This creates severe selection pressure and removes weak animals from the population.

Due to scarcity of water, the Namib Desert horse sometimes goes without water for as long as thirty hours in summer and has been known to go close to 72 hours without water during the winter, significantly longer than most horses, even other feral herds. A 1991 study suggested that in 75 years of genetic isolation and water scarcity the population had developed physiological mechanisms which improved their ability to conserve water. In 1993, a second study showed that the physiological water-conservation ability did not differ between Namib Desert horses and other populations when dehydrated for periods of up to 60 hours, but suggested that the Namib Desert horse would show improved conservation ability when dehydration periods were extended to upwards of 72 hours, a common occurrence in their feral state.

The horses, especially young foals and juveniles, provide a major food source in the southern Namib Desert for the spotted hyena, along with gemsbok and springbok. However, the availability of other food appears to have a significant influence on predation rates among the horses. Leopards and black-backed jackals also predate young horses, although this is more rare. The harsh environmental conditions in which they live are the main driver of mortality among the Namib Desert horse, as they cause dehydration, malnutrition, exhaustion and lameness. Other large plains animals, including the mountain zebra, may have once sporadically utilized the area for grazing during periods of excess rainfall, but human interference (including fencing off portions of land and hunting) have eliminated or significantly reduced the movement of these animals in the area. The endangered Hartmann's mountain zebra does exist in the Naukluft Mountain Zebra Park portion of the Namib-Naukluft Park, but their range does not intersect with that of the Namib Desert horse.

=== Genetics ===
Genetic testing results published in 2001 indicated that Namib Desert horses are one of the most isolated horse populations in the world, with the second-lowest genetic variation of all horse populations that have been studied to date. In part, this is due to their small founding population, and generally small modern population, made smaller during periods of drought. Despite the large domesticated breeding population from which the horses originally descended, at least one genetic bottleneck has occurred in the breed's history, resulting in a significant decline in genetic variation over a relatively short period of time. Although an ideal minimum population size for genetic variability would be around 200 horses, the current range cannot support this population given the average rainfall. Estimates for a necessary minimum population to maintain genetic effectiveness range between 100 and 150 animals.

The 2001 testing showed the Namib Desert horse to be part of the Oriental horse grouping, genetically closest to the Arabian horse, although even this association was distant. They were closer to the Arabian than to the three South African breeds tested, the Nooitgedacht pony, the Boer pony and the Basuto pony. As the genetic similarity to Arabian-type horses is distant, they do not closely resemble them in outward appearance, although they are both of the "hot blooded" type, resulting in both being athletic, lean-muscled animals. Further, in blood typing studies done in the 1990s, a new variant was noted. Its absence from the blood samples of all other horse breeds indicates the presence of a mutation that probably occurred after the horses became established in the desert.

== Breed history ==
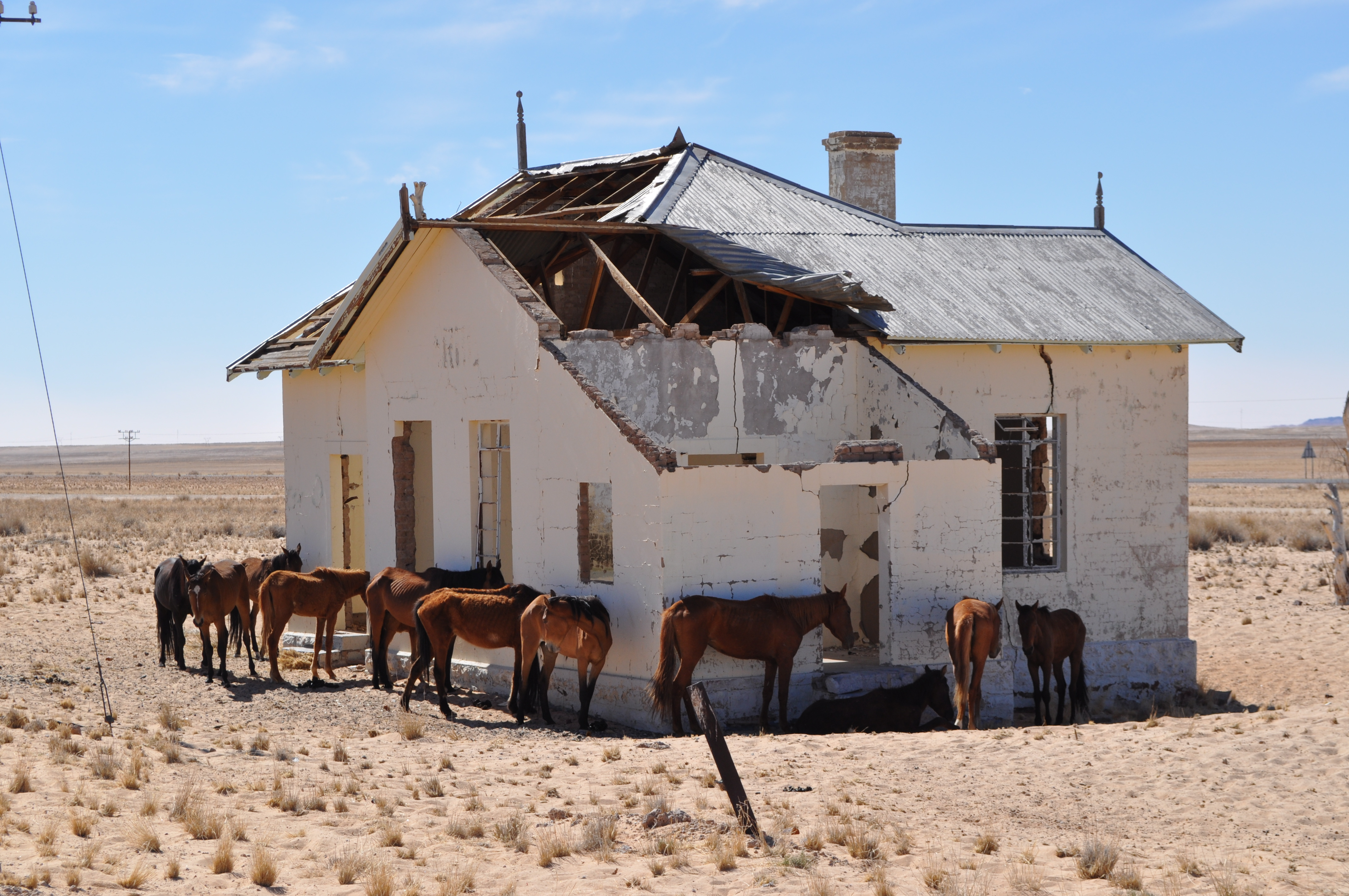
Resting in the shade next to an abandoned German train station

Southern Africa has no native horse populations, so the origins of the Namib Desert horse trace to imported herds of horses. There are several theories on the ancestors of the Namib Desert horse, and the true story may never be known. One theory says that a cargo ship carrying Thoroughbreds to Australia wrecked near the Orange River, and the strongest horses swam ashore and traveled to the Garub Plains, the home of the Namib Desert horse, near Aus, Namibia. Another theory states that they descend from Cape horse/Basuto pony crosses ridden by Khoikhoi raiders traveling from southern Africa to north of the Orange River. The most likely theory has the Namib Desert horse descending from a combination of escaped South African military horses and Namibian-bred German horses. During World War I, horses were used in campaigns in Namibia between the German Schutztruppe and South African troops, and some escaped or were released into the desert. Prior to this time, a German Baron von Wolf built Duwisib Castle on the edge of the Namib Desert, where he held a herd of approximately 300 horses. Von Wolf was killed in action in Europe during World War I, and his farm was abandoned, leaving his horses on unfenced land relatively close to the area where the Namib Desert horses now roam. The Namib Desert horse phenotypically more closely resembles the horses bred by von Wolf and ridden by the World War I-era troops than the horses ridden by Khoikhoi tribesmen, making the former story the more likely. The genetic evidence of the 2001 study gave less credence to the descent from von Wolf's horses. He used Thoroughbreds, Hackneys and Trakehners in his breeding program, rather than the Arabian horse to which the Namib Desert horses are the most genetically similar.

Research in the archives of pre-1914 horse breeding operations found at Windhoek, combined with blood typing studies, suggests that the animals descended from a gene pool of high-quality riding animals, as opposed to work horses. A study released in 2005 reinforces the theory of the Namib Desert horse descending from a combination of European-descended breeding stock and escaped military horses. One possible source of breeding stock was a stud farm near Kubub, leased by Emil Kreplin (previously mayor of Lüderitz) from 1911 to 1919. Photo albums from the stud show animals with conformation and markings similar to those seen in the modern Namib Desert horse. In addition, in early 1915, during the fighting of World War I, bombs were dropped by a German aircraft onto the South African camp near Garub. Some ordnance seems to have been specifically targeted to land among a herd of 1,700 grazing horses, for the purposes of scattering them. These escaped army animals may have joined stock animals lost from Kreplin's stud farm during the turmoil of the war. horses in the area would likely have congregated at the few existing watering places in the Aus Mountains and Garub.

=== 1970s to present ===
The Namib Desert horses were originally forced to compete with domesticated livestock turned loose by farmers onto the same ground where the horses grazed. Due in part to this competition for limited forage, the horses nearly became extinct. However, they were saved in part due to the efforts of Jan Coetzer, employee of Consolidated Diamond Mine (CDM or DBCM), mining in part of Sperrgebiet. Garub was a station for the re-filling of steam locomotives until 1977, when diesel locomotives took over the route. The horses, who had previously survived on water pumped for the locomotives, were placed in danger when the pumping stopped, with several horses dying of dehydration. Coetzer petitioned CDM to supply the horses with water, which they did in 1980, installing holding tanks and a water trough. Between 1964 and 1984, population estimates ranged between 50 and 200 horses, but generally averaged 140 to 160. In 1984, an aerial count was made that distinguished 168 horses, while ground-based observations in 1988 estimated between 150 and 200 animals.

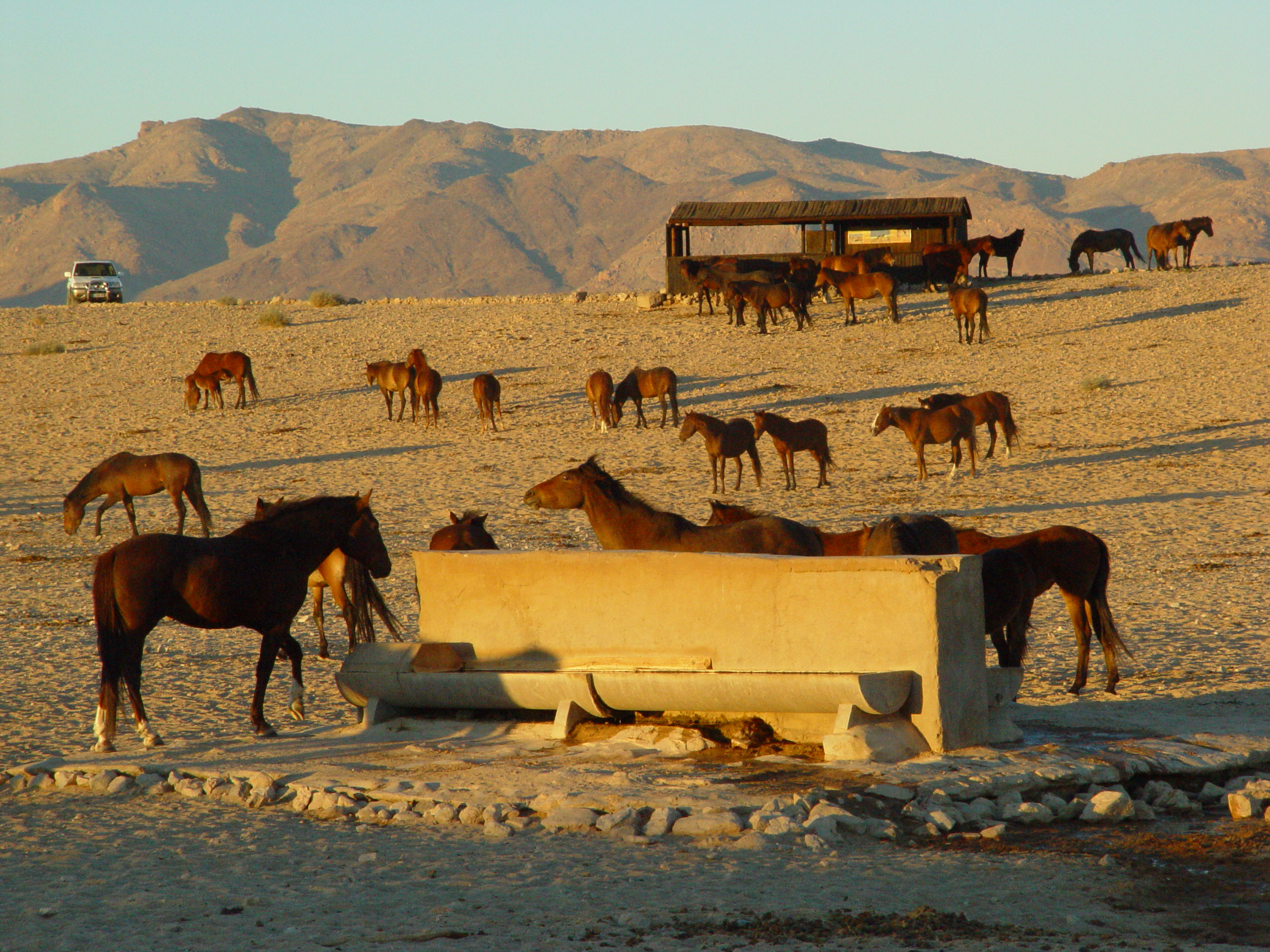
The watering hole at Garub, with a shelter for human visitors in the background.

In the mid-1980s, the horses' habitat was made part of Namib-Naukluft Park, the largest game reserve in Africa. In 1986, after the expansion to the park, a movement was made to remove all horses (which were considered an exotic species); public outcry prevented this from happening. The following year, 10 horses were removed from the park for research purposes and 8 others for use as patrol horses in Etosha National Park, although they were unsuccessful in the latter use. In 1992, as Namibia gained its independence and a drought enveloped southern Africa, a decision was made to reduce the population, then estimated at 276 animals. In June, 104 animals were captured unselectively and sold, but many did not adjust well to their new habitats and by 1997 at least half had died. In 1997, with the feral population at 149 horses, 35 horses, selected for age, gender and degree of genetic relationship, were removed, with the intent being to sell them at auction. The horses were kept in holding pens for six weeks, during which time the stallions became very aggressive and had to be separated; after this, the auction was cancelled and the horses released back to their range. Beginning in December 1993, semiannual population counts have been completed. Between 1993 and 2005, herd numbers ranged between 89 and 149 animals, with the 1999–2001 counts providing sub-100 population numbers. Although several attempts were originally made to exterminate the horses, due to a possible threat to oryx habitat, they are now protected by the South West Africa/Namibia Directorate of Nature Conservation. The Namib Desert horse is likely the only herd of feral horses in Africa.

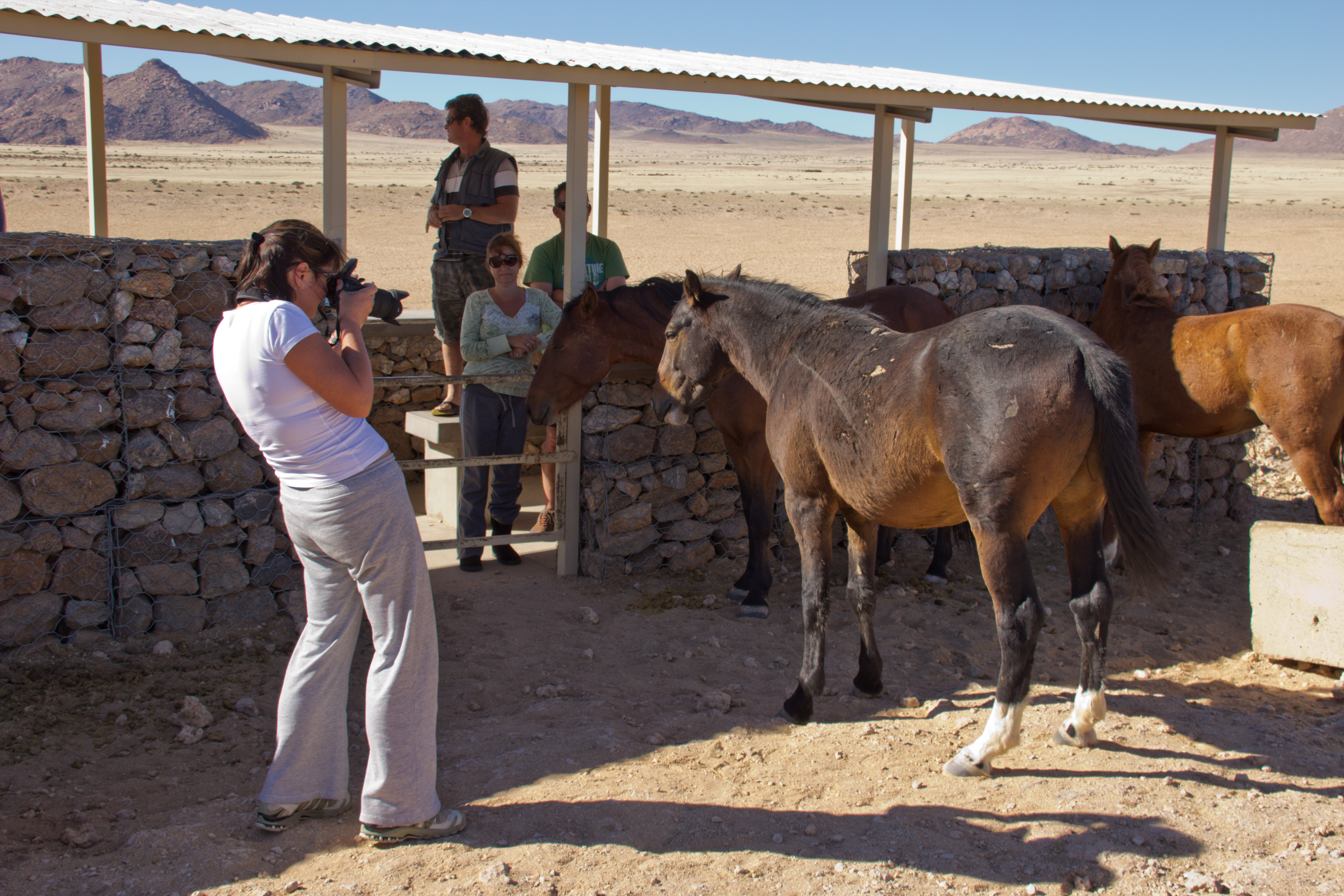
Feral Namib horses interacting closely with human visitors to the watering hole at Garub

There is concern in some quarters that the horses are a negative influence on their habitat, through overgrazing and competition with native species. While exotic species, such as the Namib Desert horse, are generally unwanted in the Namib-Naukluft Park, the horses are a special case, given their close ties with Namibian history, their popularity with visitors, and their appeal as subjects for case studies of feral horse bands. Studies during 2003 and 2004, however, found that while an area of approximately 100 metres (330 ft) around the watering area at Garub has been affected by the horses, there was no significant disturbance of the area outside this radius. The amount and species of vegetation found outside the watering area appear more affected by rainfall then by the horses, probably due to the low population density and natural rotational grazing. Due to the lack of effect on vegetation by horses, it is unlikely that they significantly influence small mammal populations. The horses also appear to have no measurable effect on any vulnerable or endangered plant or animal species, which in several cases are more threatened by human influence. As the horses are restricted to a certain grazing area and native large herbivores are not, the horses do not pose a danger to the latter species. The horses in the Namib Desert were originally known by the local population as "ghost horses", as they mostly stayed away from human habitations and were rarely seen. However, when their grazing grounds were made part of the game reserve, a policy of limited intervention was put in place that encouraged support to be given to the horses when necessary, bringing the horses into closer contact with humans. This also included closer contact with tourists to Namibia, who frequently see them at the watering area at Garub and near the main road that traverses their grazing grounds. While the horses are credited with bringing tourist dollars to Namibia, there are also concerns about negative horse-human interactions, including vehicle accidents, disruption to sensitive areas by people looking for the horses and disruption of herd dynamics due to becoming too used to or dependent upon humans.

== See also ==
- Running Free film
