= Boerperd =

South African breed of horse

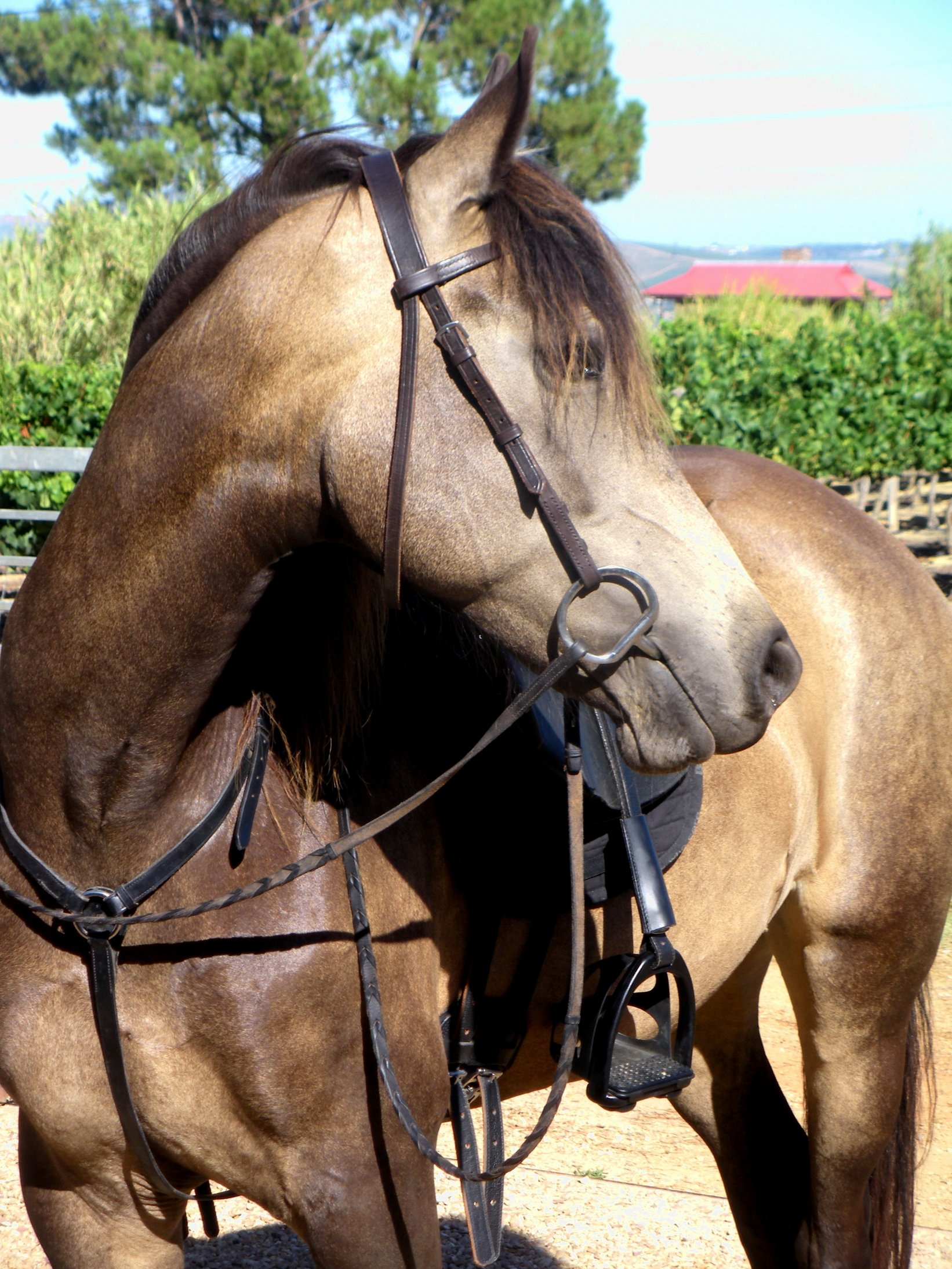
- Conservation status: FAO (2007): no data
- Other names: Boer; SA Boerperd; Historiese Boerperd; Kaapse Boerperd; Cape Boerperd; Boer Pony; Hantam
- Country of origin: South Africa; Botswana

The Boerperd is a modern South African breed of riding horse. It is a re-creation of the traditional Cape Horse or old-type Boer Horse, which is now extinct.

== History ==
The origins of the Cape Horse go back to the horses taken to southern Africa by the Dutch settlers who established the first European settlement in the area of the Cape of Storms in 1652 – there were no indigenous horses in the area. The first four of these were imported from Java by the Dutch East India Company in 1653; it is likely that they were of Arab or Barb type, but some may have been of Mongolian origin, as Mongolian horses had earlier been introduced to Java. A few Persian Arab stallions were later added to the horse population in the area when a ship sailing from Java to Persia ran aground on the South African coast. Some use was made from about 1820 of imported stallions of both Arab and Thoroughbred stock, and then – in the later nineteenth and early twentieth centuries – there were various additions of Cleveland Bay, Friesian, Hackney, Norfolk Trotter and Oldenburger blood; the Friesian could not legally be shipped from the Netherlands, so instead were shipped from Antwerp as "Flemish" or Vlaamperd. This mixed stock came to be known as the Cape Horse or Hantam.

During the Boer Wars between 1880 and 1902, many old-type Boer horses were killed: some died in the fighting, while others were shot on Boer farms. By the end of the wars, numbers were greatly reduced and conservation efforts began. From 1905 until about 1920 the horses could be registered with the horse-breeders' association of Transvaal.

A breeders' association, the Kaapse Boerperd Breeders' Society of South Africa, was formed in 1948. A separate association, the Boerperd Society of South Africa, formed in 1973. It became the Historiese Boerperd Breeders Society in 1977, and SA Boerperd in 1998. The Historiese Boerperd was officially recognised by the Department of Agriculture in 1996. Both associations are members of the SA Stud Book Association.

The first horses to be imported into Australia were of this breed, which thus contributed to the evolution of the Australian Waler. The extinct Basuto Pony, Calvinia, Cape Harness and Namaqua Pony all derived from the same original stock, as does the Nooitgedachter.

== Use ==
The Boerperd is used as a general riding horse and in agriculture; it is suitable for competitive endurance riding.
