= Sudanese Country-Bred =

Sudanese breed of horse

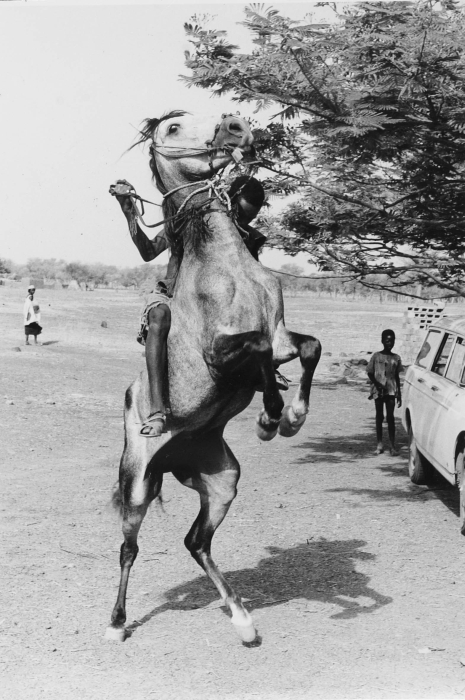
- Conservation status: FAO (2007): not at risk; DAD-IS (2023): not at risk
- Other names: Sudan Country-Bred
- Country of origin: Sudan
- Use: riding horse

Traits
- Colour: bay; brown; chestnut; roan; grey; black

The Sudanese Country-Bred is a Sudanese breed of light riding horse. It was bred in the twentieth century by cross-breeding local mares of Barb type with imported Arab or Thoroughbred stallions.

It is one of four recognised horse breeds in Sudan, the others being the Dongola or Dongolawi, the Tawleed and the Western Sudan Pony.

== History ==
The Sudanese Country-Bred was created in the early twentieth century, when a government programme of "improvement" was instituted, under which local mares of Barb type – of the traditional Dongola and Gharbaui (Western Sudan Pony) populations – were put to stallions of Arab and Thoroughbred stock. Some of this breeding was done at the stud farm of Nyala in South Darfur. While the cross-bred animals were larger, they had lost some of the qualities of the local animals, such as hardiness and the ability to go for long periods without water. By the 1950s or 1960s few local horses remained unaffected by this process.

In 1994 the total number of the horses was reported to be 65000. The conservation status of the breed was listed as "not at risk" by the Food and Agriculture Organization of the United Nations in 2007, and also by the DAD-IS database in 2023.

The Tawleed, a sport horse breed of Khartoum, was developed from the Country-Bred through further cross-breeding with imported stock, principally Thoroughbred.

== Characteristics ==
The coat colour most commonly seen is bay, followed by (in descending order) brown, chestnut, roan, grey and black.

== Use ==
The horses are used for riding.
