= Western Sudan Pony =

Sudanese breed of small horse

- Conservation status: FAO (2007): not at risk; DAD-IS (2023): not at risk
- Other names: Gharbaui; Darfur Pony; Kordofani; Mayray; Messeri; Reziegi Taaishi
- Country of origin: Sudan
- Distribution: southern Darfur; south-western Kordofan; southern Chad

Traits
- Weight: Male: 450 kg; Female: 400 kg
- Height: Male: 140 cm; Female: 140 cm
- Colour: bay; chestnut; grey

Western Sudan Pony is an exonym for a Sudanese breed or group of breeds or ecotypes of small horse or pony. These are distributed principally in southern Darfur and south-western Kordofan, extending into southern Chad, and are known generically as Gharbaui ("western") (Note: Gharbaui derives from the Arabic root غرب, "west"; the spelling Gharkawi appears to be a misprint.) or by a variety of regional names including Darfur Pony and Kordofani.

The Western Sudan Pony is one of four recognised horse breeds in Sudan, the others being the Dongola or Dongolawi, the Sudanese Country-Bred and the Tawleed.

== History ==
The Gharbaui is originally of Barb type. In the twentieth century a government programme of "improvement" was instituted at the stud farm of Nyala in South Darfur, and local mares were put to stallions of Arab and Thoroughbred stock, with consequent degradation of the local types; what the cross-bred animals gained in size they lost in hardiness and type. By the 1950s or 1960s few of the horses remained unaffected by this process.

In 1994 the total number of the horses was reported to be 8000–10000. The conservation status of the breed was listed as "not at risk" by the Food and Agriculture Organization of the United Nations in 2007, and also by the DAD-IS database in 2023.

== Characteristics ==
The Gharbaui is a small horse, with an average height at the withers of some 140 cm or 145 cm. It resembles the Barb and has many of its good qualities, particularly its hardiness and endurance. The neck and shoulders are strong and the back and croup well formed; the legs tend to be poorly conformed. The profile is convex. The coat is most commonly grey, but may also be bay or chestnut.

== Use ==
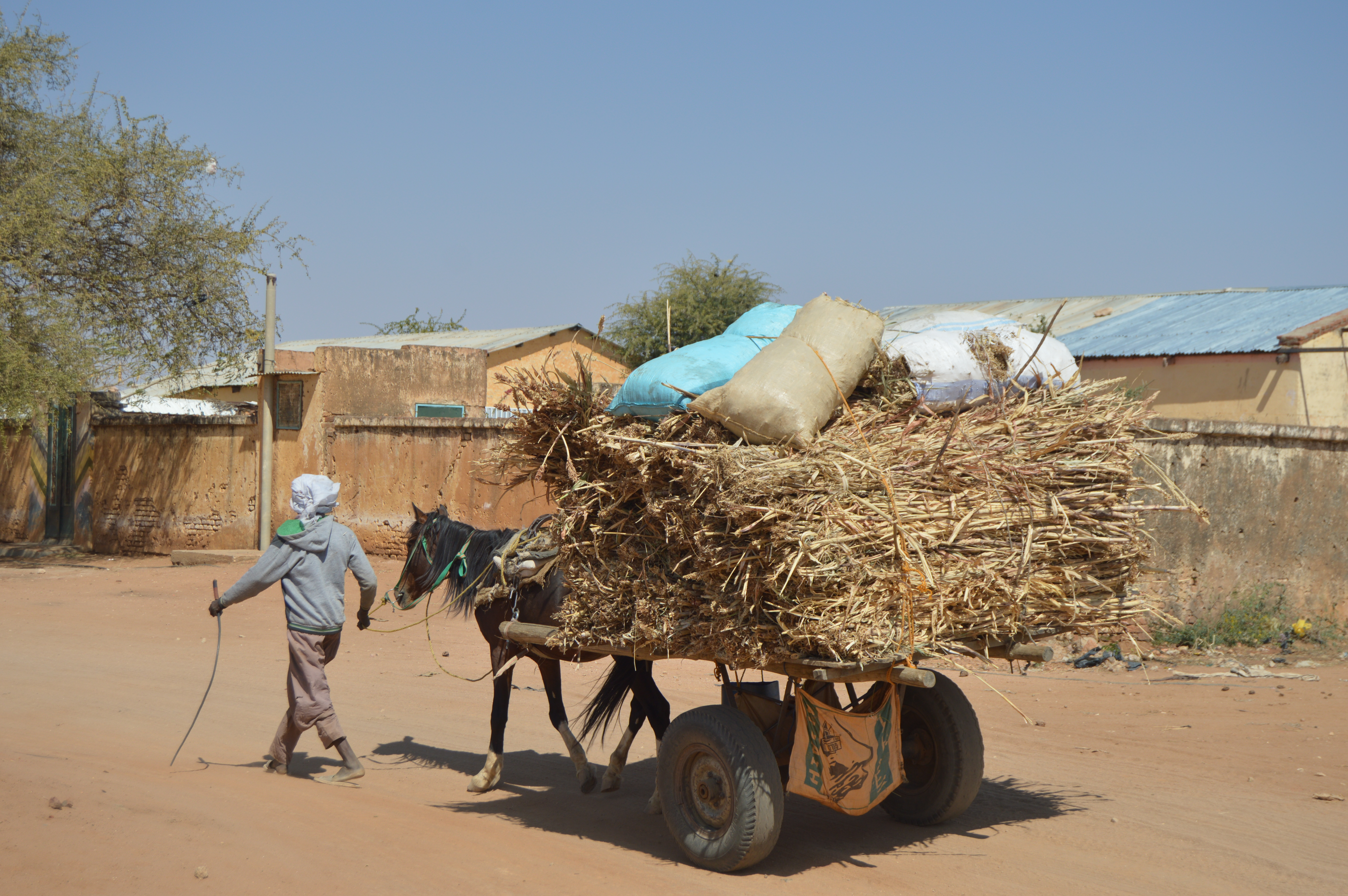
Sudanese vegetable cart drawn by a small horse or pony

The horses are used for riding and as draught animals.
