= Bhirum Pony =

Nigerian horse breed

- Conservation status: FAO (2007): no data
- Other names: Nigerian Pony
- Country of origin: Nigeria

Traits
- Height: 142–147 cm (56–58 in)

The Bhirum Pony or Nigerian Pony is a Nigerian breed of pony or small horse. It developed in Nigeria’s northern regions.

== Characteristics ==
The Bhirum Pony is said to be descended from either the Poney Mousseye of Cameroon, or the Barb horse. They are thought to have been crossed with Nigerian ponies. The species are about 14 hands tall, and have been considered as a very "handsome" pony breed.
