= Namaqua Pony =

Breed of horse

The Namaqua Pony is an extinct breed of horse from South Africa. It was similar to the Basuto pony and originated from the Cape Horse.
