= M'Par =

Senegalese breed of horse

- Other names: Mpar; Cayor; Cheval du Cayor
- Country of origin: Senegal

Traits
- Height: 1.25–1.35 m

The M'Par or Mpar is a Senegalese breed of small horse from the historic region of Cayor in northern and central Senegal. It may for that reason be called the French: Cheval de Cayor. It is the smallest of the four Senegalese horse breeds, the others being the M'Bayar, the Fleuve and the Foutanké.

== History ==
The origins of the horse in Senegal are not documented. It may be an autochthonous breed with ancient origins in the area, or may derive from Barb horses from the Maghreb countries to the north.

In 1996, Senegal had a horse population of about 400000 head, the largest of any West African country. This was a substantial increase from the 216000 reported in 1978, and a much greater increase from the population after the Second World War, estimated at barely 30000. Population numbers for the M'Par are not reported. In 2007 the Food and Agriculture Organization of the United Nations did not have data from which to estimate the conservation status of the M'Par breed.

The M'Par is gradually being assimilated into the much larger M'Bayar population, and is at risk of extinction.

== Characteristics ==
The M'Par is a small horse, standing some 1.25 to 1.35 m at the withers. It is generally of poor conformation – heavy-headed, too long in the back, thin-legged, flat-chested and often with defective conformation of the legs. In compensation for these defects, it has exceptional qualities of endurance and rusticity.

== Use ==
Horses play an important part in the social and economic life in Senegal. The M'Par is used as a light draught horse. Because of its small size it is able to pull only light carts and fiacres.
