= Fleuve =

Senegalese breed of horse

- Other names: Wolof: Naru Gor; Narugor; French: Cheval du Fleuve
- Country of origin: Senegal

Traits
- Weight: 325 kg
- Height: over 1.44 m

The Fleuve is a Senegalese breed of riding horse. Its name is the French word for "big river"; it is named for the Senegal River (French: Fleuve Sénégal). It is one of four Senegalese horse breeds, the others being the Foutanké, the M'Bayar and the M'Par.

== History ==
The origins of the horse in Senegal are not documented. The Fleuve derives from Sahel-type horses from the Hodh and Kayes regions of modern-day Mauretania and Mali, to the north of Senegal. Those in turn are descended from Barb horses from the Maghreb countries further to the north. The Fleuve has been described as a "degenerate Barb".

In 1996, Senegal had a horse population of about 400000 head, the largest of any West African country. This was a substantial increase from the 216000 reported in 1978, and a much greater increase from the population after the Second World War, estimated at barely 30000. Population numbers for the Fleuve are not reported. In 2007 the Food and Agriculture Organization of the United Nations did not have data from which to estimate the conservation status of the breed.

== Characteristics ==
The Fleuve is normally grey. It is a well-made horse, with a fine head and slender legs; it is energetic, with lively gaits. Poor examples may be too narrow in the chest, or have insufficient bone in the legs.

== Use ==
Horses play an important part in the social and economic life in Senegal. The Fleuve was once the horse of chieftains; it is now used as a saddle-horse and for horse-racing.

It is also used in cross-breeding: a cross between a Fleuve stallion and an M'Bayar mare gives rise to the type called Foutanké.
