= Tawleed =

Sudanese breed of horse

- Conservation status: FAO (2007): no data; DAD-IS (2023): at risk/endangered
- Country of origin: Sudan
- Distribution: Khartoum region
- Use: sport horse

The Tawleed is a Sudanese breed of sport horse. It derives from the Sudanese Country-Bred through cross-breeding with imported blood horses, principally of Thoroughbred stock. It is found mainly in the Khartoum region of Sudan.

It is one of four recognised horse breeds in Sudan, the others being the Dongola or Dongolawi, the Western Sudan Pony and the Sudanese Country-Bred, from which the Tawleed derives.

== History ==
The Sudanese Country-Bred was bred in the twentieth century by cross-breeding local mares of the traditional Dongola and Gharbaui (Western Sudan Pony) breeds with imported Arab or Thoroughbred stallions. The Tawleed was the result of further cross-breeding of this with imported blood horses, principally of Thoroughbred stock.

The Tawleed is found mainly in the area of Khartoum. The total population in 2018 was no greater than about 1500 head.

== Characteristics ==
The Tawleed may have a lower tolerance of heat and drought than local Sudanese horses, and a greater need for plentiful water, food and shade from the tropical sun.
