= M'Bayar =

Senegalese breed of horse

- Other names: Baol; Mbayar; Poney Mbayar
- Country of origin: Senegal

Traits
- Weight: 201–260 kg
- Height: 1.33–1.44 m

The M'Bayar is a Senegalese breed of small horse from the historic region of Baol in central Senegal. It is the most numerous of the four Senegalese horse breeds, the others being the Fleuve, the Foutanké and the M'Par.

== History ==
The origins of the horse in Senegal are not documented. The M'Bayar may either be an autochthonous breed with ancient origins in the area, or may be a descendant of Barb horses from the Maghreb countries to the north. In the twentieth century the breed was influenced by Barb horses imported from Mali, Mauretania and Morocco; the pure-blood Arab and Anglo-Arab stock at the Centre de Recherches Zootechniques of Dahra have also had an influence.

In 1996, Senegal had a horse population of about 400000 head, the largest of any West African country. This was a substantial increase from the 216000 reported in 1978, and a much greater increase from the population after the Second World War, estimated at barely 30000. The M'Bayar is the most numerous of the four Senegalese horse breeds.

In 2007 the Food and Agriculture Organization of the United Nations did not have data from which to estimate the conservation status of the M'Bayar breed.

The Foutanké or Fouta breed of Senegal derives from cross-breeding of M'Bayar mares with Fleuve stallions.

== Characteristics ==
The M'Bayar is a small stocky horse, broad in the chest and short in the neck. The legs are strong, but often suffer from cow hocks and other conformational defects. The predominant coat colour is bay, but grey, roan and chestnut are also commonly seen. The M'Bayar is calm and docile, rustic, strong and enduring. Height at the withers varies from 1.33 to 1.44 m; the average height of stallions and geldings is 137 cm.

== Use ==
Horses play an important part in the social and economic life in Senegal. The M'Bayar is used as a light draught horse, both for transport and for tillage. It is also used for horse-racing. Consumption of horse meat in Senegal is very low, for religious and cultural reasons, but some carcasses are sent to a specialised butcher's shop in Dakar.
