= Foutanké =

Senegalese breed of horse

- Other names: Fouta; Sine-Saloum
- Country of origin: Senegal

The Foutanké or Fouta is a Senegalese breed or type of light horse. It results from the cross-breeding of stallions of the Fleuve breed with M'Bayar mares; its conformation is similar to that of the Fleuve. It is one of the four recognised Senegalese horse breeds – the others being the M'Bayar, the Fleuve and the M'Par – and is highly valued for horse-racing.

== History ==
The origins of the horse in Senegal are not documented. In 1996, Senegal had a horse population of about 400000 head, the largest of any West African country. This was a substantial increase from the 216000 reported in 1978, and a much greater increase from the population after the Second World War, estimated at barely 30000. Population numbers for the Foutanké are not reported. In 2007 the Food and Agriculture Organization of the United Nations did not have data from which to estimate the conservation status of the breed.
