= Nooitgedachter =

South African breed of horse

- Conservation status: FAO (2007): endangered; DAD-IS (2021): unknown
- Other names: Nooitgedachtperd; Nooitgedacht Pony; Nooitgedacht Horse
- Country of origin: South Africa
- Standard: Nooitgedachter Perdetelers Genootskap
- Use: riding; driving

Traits
- Weight: Male: 440 kg; Female: 340 kg
- Height: 138–163 cm
- Colour: any solid colour

The Nooitgedachter is a South African breed of riding horse. It is the result of a selective breeding programme established in 1952 to preserve the Basutho Pony of Lesotho. It was later decided to give it a different name; it was at first called the Nooitgedacht Pony, named for the Proefplaas Nooitgedacht, the research station near Ermelo in Eastern Transvaal (now Mpumalanga) where it was bred; it was later called the Nooitgedacht Horse until the present name was chosen. It is a rare breed, with only about 400 purebreds in existence.

== History ==
The Nooitgedachter was created in the mid-twentieth century by the Department of Agriculture of the Union of South Africa, which established a programme of selective breeding at the Proefplaas Nooitgedacht, a research station near Ermelo in Eastern Transvaal (now Mpumalanga). The project was initially called the Basutho Pony Project, and had two aims: to preserve the Basutho Pony of Lesotho, which had been in decline since the time of the Anglo-Boer War of 1899–1902; and to create a breed of hardy riding horse for South Africa. The name was later changed, first to Nooitgedacht Pony, then to Nooitgedacht Horse, and finally to Nooitgedachter. Although the Afrikaans word nooitgedacht means roughly "never imagined", this is not the origin of the name of the breed, which derives from that of the research station.

== Characteristics ==
The Nooitgedachter was bred to be a sturdy and compact riding horse capable of carrying a heavy adult rider over difficult terrain for extended periods, with good stamina, a good temperament, and hooves so strong that it does not normally need to be shod. Height at the withers ranges from 138 to 163 cm (13.2 to 16.0 hands).

In the early years of the breeding programme grey – in all its shades – was the preferred coat colour. Under the 2015 breed standard, the horses may be of any solid colour; patterned coats – such as spotted, skewbald or piebald – are disallowed, as are blue eyes and de-pigmented skin.

The horses commonly have five gaits. In addition to the usual walk, trot and canter they may also have an ambling gait, known as strykstap, and a rack, which in South Africa is called "triple".

== Uses ==
The Nooitgedachter is a strong and hardy riding horse, well adapted to the environmental conditions of South Africa, and suitable for use as a working horse in the management of farm livestock. In modern times, Nooitgedachters are used for English riding disciplines including dressage, show jumping, equitation, showing, distance riding, and endurance riding.
