= Poney du Logone =

African breed of horse

- Conservation status: FAO (2007): not at risk; DAD-IS (2025): unknown
- Other names: Kirdi; Lakka; Mbaï; Pagan; Poney de la Kabia; Poney Hoho; Poney Mousseye; Poney Musey; Sara
- Country of origin: Cameroon; Chad
- Distribution: valley of the Logone River

Traits
- Weight: 175 kg
- Height: up to 125 cm; Male: 126 cm; Female: 124 cm

The Poney du Logone is a breed of small horse or pony from the area of the Logone River in Chad and Cameroon, in west central Africa. It is particularly associated with the Musey or Moussey people of that region, and may also be known as the Poney Musey or Poney Mousseye.

== History ==
There are many descriptions of the small horses of the Marba-Musey people of the flood-plain of the middle reaches of the Logone River in south-western Chad and northern Cameroon; among them are those of Dixon Denham in 1826 and Gustav Nachtigal in 1880. Horse-breeding in the area remained relatively unchanged until the 1980s; in 1985 the horse population there was estimated at 6000–6500 head.

In 2007 the Poney du Logone population in Chad was listed as "not at risk" by the Food and Agriculture Organization of the United Nations; No population data has been reported to DAD-IS since 2006, when a total of 7500 head was reported for the year 1987; in 2025 the conservation status of the breed in Chad was unknown. In Cameroon the breed is considered a relic of the past, and to be at risk of extinction.

== Characteristics ==
The head of the Poney du Logone is not heavy, as is sometimes reported, but is well proportioned, with a slightly convex profile and wide nostrils. The principal coat colour is bay, followed by bay roan, chestnut and chestnut roan. The average height at the withers is 124 cm for mares and 126 cm for stallions and geldings; average body weight is of the order of 175 kg.

The Poney du Logone is one of two horse breeds reported to show tolerance of – or resistance to – tsetse-borne trypanosomosis, or "sleeping sickness". The other horse breed reported to be tolerant or resistant is the Bandiagara of Mali and Niger.
