= Basuto Pony =

Breed of horse

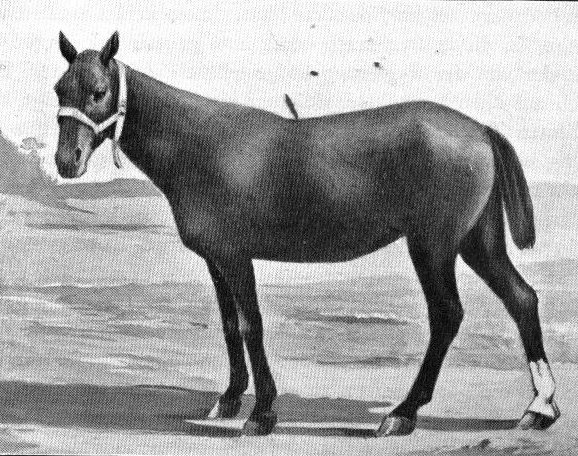
- Illustration from 1909
- Conservation status: FAO (2007): extinct; DAD-IS (2025): extinct
- Other names: Basotho Pony
- Country of origin: South Africa
- Distribution: Lesotho

Traits
- Height: up to 147 cm
- Colour: dark colours, grey

The Basuto or Basotho Pony was an African breed of small horse. It developed in the territory that is now South Africa, but is more closely associated with Lesotho (formerly Basutoland). In the twenty-first century it is reported to be extinct or close to extinction.

== History ==
The origins of the Basuto Pony go back to the horses taken to southern Africa by the Dutch settlers who established the first European settlement in the area of the Cape of Storms in 1652 – there were no indigenous horses in the area. The first four of these were imported from Java by the Dutch East India Company in 1653; it is likely that they were of Arab or Barb type, but some may have been of Mongolian origin, as Mongolian horses had earlier been introduced to Java. A few Persian Arab stallions were later added to the horse population in the area when a ship sailing from Java to Persia ran aground on the South African coast. From about 1820 European horses of many types – Cleveland Bay, Friesian, Hackney, Norfolk Trotter, Oldenburger and Thoroughbred – were imported and cross-bred with local stock with the aim of increasing its size and "quality"; the Basuto Pony derives from horses that escaped this inter-breeding, many of which were taken into Basutoland at about the time of king Moshoeshoe I, the 1820s.

In the early twentieth century the breed was close to extinction; an unsuccessful attempt to introduce Highland Pony blood was made in 1917. a conservation project involving cross-breeding with the Connemara Pony was initiated in the 1970s. It was listed as "extinct" by the Food and Agriculture Organization of the United Nations in 2007, and in 2025 was listed in DAD-IS with the same conservation status.

== Characteristics ==
The Basotho Pony is a small, sturdy horse; height at the withers does not exceed 147 cm.

It is well adapted to the mountain terrain in which it lives – it has good endurance, can withstand extreme temperatures, can graze on poor pasture and has strong thick-walled hooves that do not need to be shod. It has two gaits in addition to the usual walk, trot and gallop, one of them the stepped rack known in South Africa as the trippel.

The coat may be grey or any of the usual dark colours.

== Use ==
The horses were used by Sotho people for riding in the harsh mountain terrain of Lesotho, which lies entirely at over 1400 m above sea level.
