= Dongola horse =

African breed of horse

Dongola
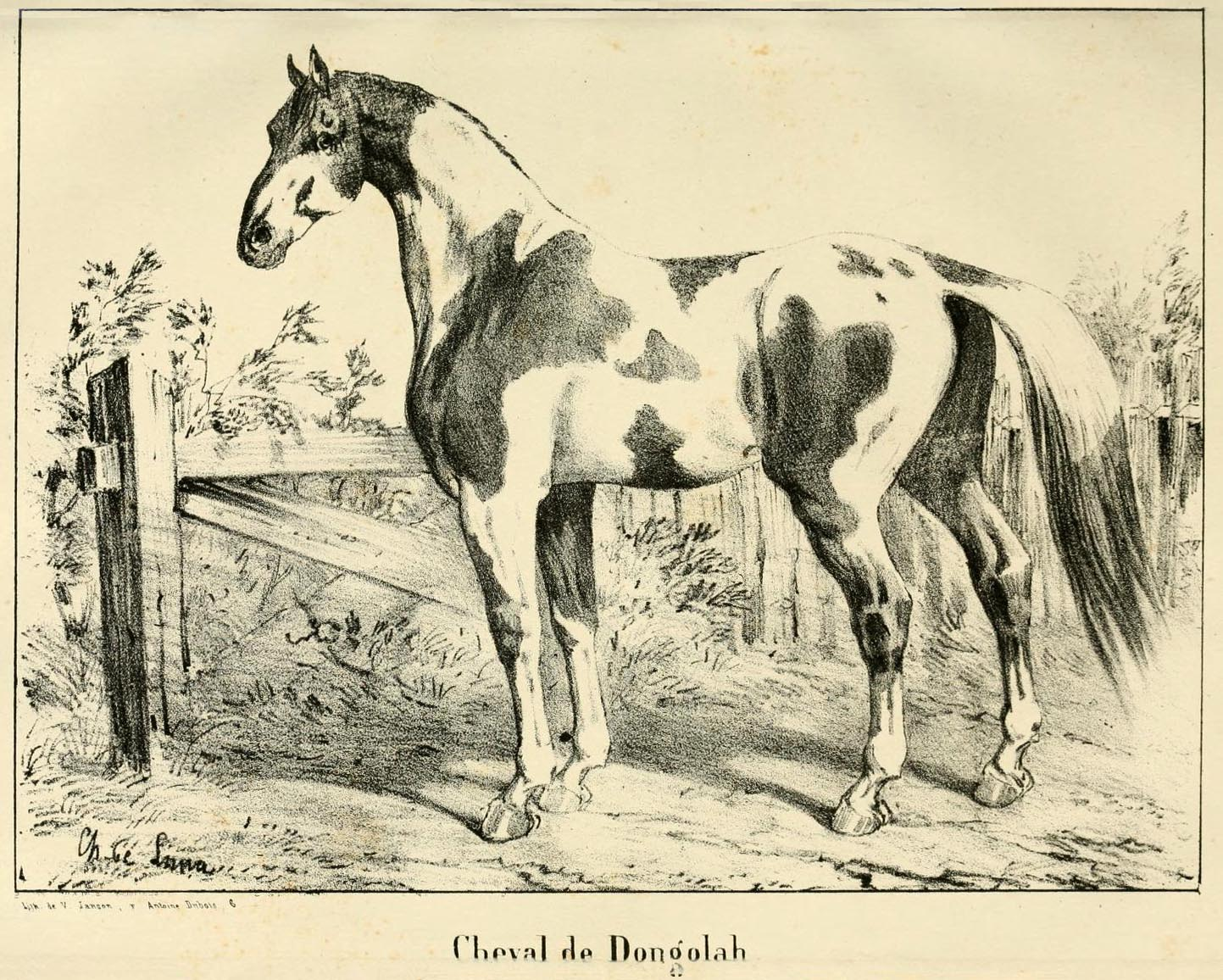
- Engraving from the Dictionnaire d'hippiatrique et d'équitation by François-Joseph-Zanobi-Gaëtan Cardini, 1848

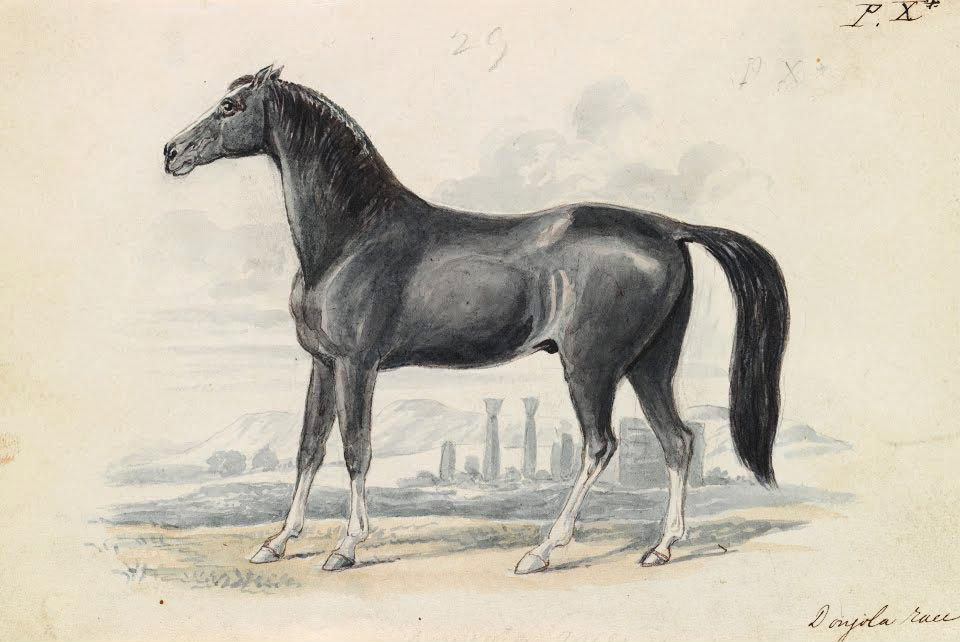
- Watercolour with pen and ink by Charles Hamilton Smith, 1837
- Conservation status: not at risk
- Other names: Dongolawi
- Country of origin: Sudan
- Distribution: Sudan; Eritrea; Somalia; Cameroon; Central African Republic; Chad
- Use: riding

Traits
- Height: 152–157 cm

The Dongola or Dongolawi is an African breed or group of breeds of riding horse. It is predominantly of Barb type, though there may have been some Arab influence in the past. It originated in the Dongola province of Sudan, for which it is named. In eastern Africa it is distributed in the northern part of Sudan and western Eritrea; it is also present in several West African countries including Cameroon, Chad and the Central African Republic. A number of local West African breeds or types derive from it; they may be regarded as sub-types, or may be reported as separate breeds.

== History ==
The Dongola originated in – and is named for – the former Kingdom of Dongola in northern Sudan, now in the wilayat of Northern Sudan. A description from the eighteenth century compares its strength to that of a coach horse, while in the nineteenth century it was described as quite unlike any Oriental horse, over 160 cm in height but short in the body.

It was valued as a war horse, and some were imported for this reason to various European countries; it was much used by the cavalry of the Ethiopian Army during the Italo-Abyssinian War of 1895–1896.

Regional variants or sub-breeds include:

- the West African Dongola in Cameroon and the Central African Republic, usually dark or black with extensive white markings to the legs and sometimes to the belly
- the Bahr-el-Ghazal or Dongola breed of the Bahr-el-Ghazal region of Chad, which stands about 148–152 cm, weighs some 350–400 kg, and is usually dark with extensive white markings to the legs and sometimes to the belly; it may also be called the Kréda or Ganaston
- the Bornu of north-eastern Nigeria
- and the Haoussa or Hausa in northern Nigeria and parts of Niger.

A number of local West African breeds or types derive from cross-breeding Dongola and Barb stock; they may be regarded as sub-types of the Barb or of the Dongola, or may be reported as separate breeds. They include:

- in Burkina Faso, the Mossi and, in the northern part of the country, the Yagha or Liptako
- in Mali, the Bandiagara or Gondo, a light horse of about 150–152 cm, normally either bay or grey, and the Songhaq or Songhoï
- in central Niger, the Djerma, a light horse seen in dark coat colours
- in Nigeria, the Nigerian, which stands about 142–147 cm and is used for riding, for light traction and for pack work.

== Characteristics ==
The Dongola usually has a convex profile.
