= Barb horse =

North African breed of horse

Barb
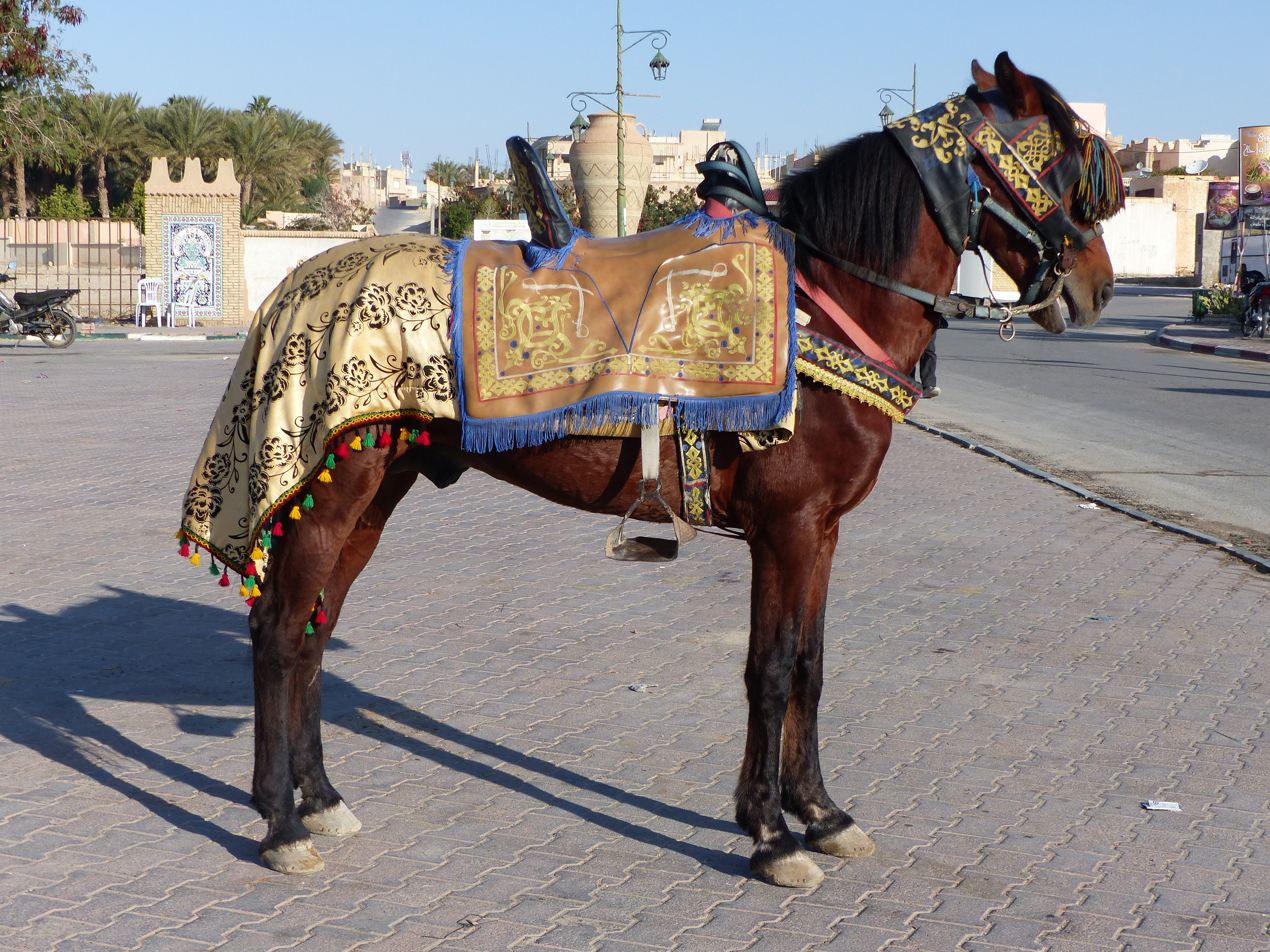
- Harnessed for a traditional fantasia performance in Tozeur, Tunisia

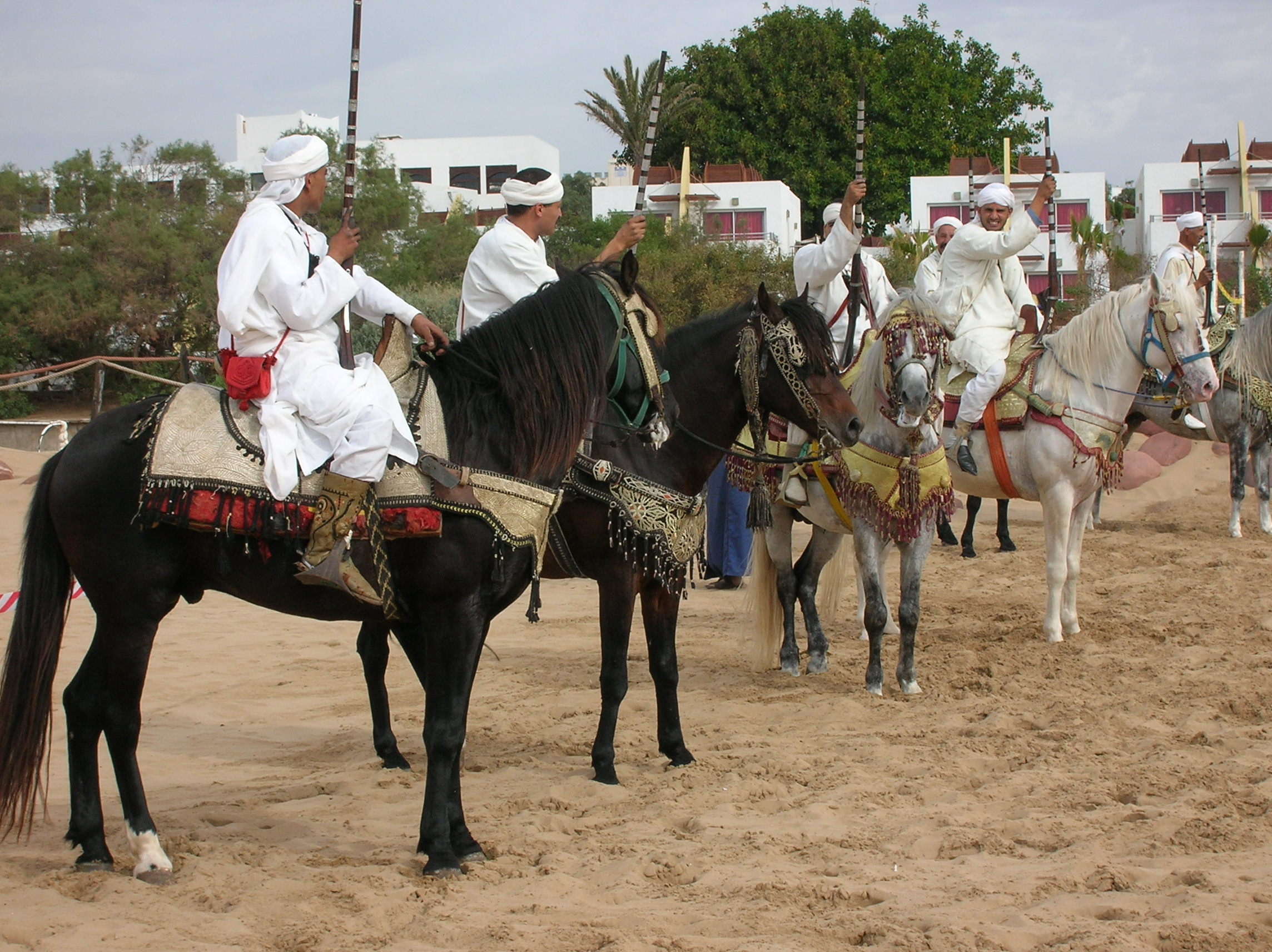
- Berber riders in Agadir, in Morocco
- Other names: Barbary; Berber
- Country of origin: Algeria; Mauritania; Morocco; Mali; Senegal; Tunisia
- Distribution: Africa, Europe

Traits
- Colour: bay; black; chestnut; grey

The Barb or Berber (Note: In Berber: ⴰⴳⵎⴰⵔ ⴰⵎⴰⵣⵉⵖ, romanized: agmar amaziɣ; in Arabic: حصان بربري) is a North African breed of riding horse with great hardiness and stamina. It is closely associated with the history of Berber or Amazigh peoples of the Maghreb. It has influenced a number of modern breeds, including many in northern and western Africa.

== Etymology ==
The first recorded use of the name "Barb" appears in the translation of the work Description of Africa by Hassan al-Wazzan (better known as Leo Africanus), which predates its adoption across Europe.. The Barb horse breed derives its name from the Barbary Coast states, according to French historian Jean-Marie Lassère, who attributes the name to the tradition of naming animals based on their geographical origin. Jean-Louis Gouraud, on the other hand, connects the Barb to the Berbers (the European name for the Imazighen), stating that "their histories and fates are inseparable". European sources also referred to this regional horse as "Berber," in reference to a region known under Roman rule as "Berberia" or "Barbaria". The term "Berber" is rooted in the ancient Greek word barbaros, a label the Romans used for non-Romans, especially the Numidians. Before this distinction, the term "Barb horse" was often synonymous with the Spanish Jennet or Zenata horse, referring to horses bred by the Moors (the European term for the conquerors of Al-Andalus) in the Iberian Peninsula.

== History ==
The Godolphin Arabian, one of the foundation sires of the Thoroughbred, was often referred to as the "Godolphin Barb" due to his origins in Tunisia, though his actual breed remains debated. Some sources argue that his conformation more closely resembled a high-quality Barb horse rather than an Arabian.

In 2014, the International Equestrian Federation recognized the Barb horse as its Horse of Honor at the World Equestrian Games in Normandy.

=== Influence on other breeds ===
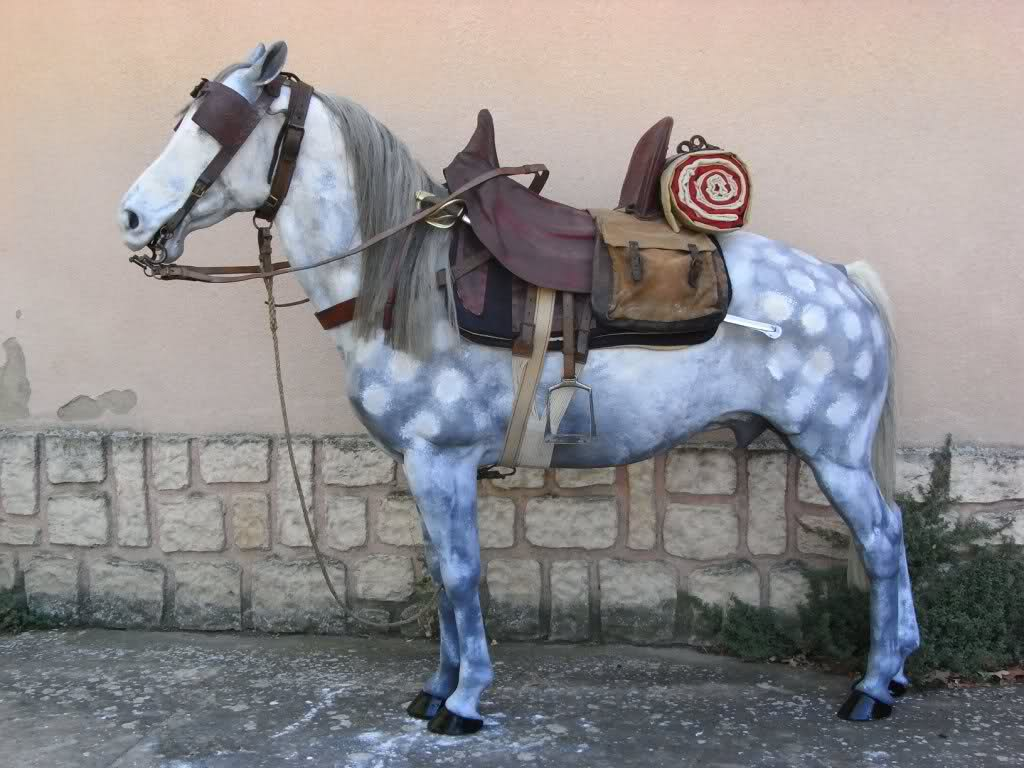
With a Spahi harness

The Barb may have had more influence on the racing breeds throughout the world than any other horse except the Arabian. Berber invaders from North Africa took their horses, the forerunners of today's Barbs, to Europe from the early eighth century onwards. Once established with settlers on the Iberian Peninsula, the Barb horse was bred with Spanish stock under 300 years of Umayyad patronage to develop the Andalusian (and the Lusitano).

The Barb horses were valued by other Europeans, including the Italians, whose noble families established large racing stables. During the sixteenth century, Henry VIII purchased a number of Barbary horses from Federico Gonzaga of Mantua, importing seven mares and a stallion. He continued to buy other Barbs and Andalusians. After the Royal Stables were sold off under Cromwell, private owners in England continued to value the Barbs and used them to develop the Thoroughbred.

The Barb also was valued for its "strong, short-coupled body, perfect for collection – the posture that makes weight-bearing easiest for the horse – its eagerness to learn and its gentle nature." Because of these characteristics, beginning in the sixteenth century, the horses were also trained for dressage, in Paris and other European capitals. Sixteenth-century and later portraits of royalty on horses frequently portrayed the latter in dressage positions.

The large West African Barb group of breeds derives from this horse. Among the breeds in the group are: the Bélédoughou, Hodh and Sahel of Mali; the Bhirum Pony and Sulebawa of Nigeria; the Bobo of Burkina Faso; the Fleuve, Foutanké, M'Bayar and M'Par of Senegal; the Koto-Koli of Benin and Togo; the Poney du Logone of Cameroon and Chad; and the Torodi of western Niger.

== See also ==
- Andalusian horse
- Arabian horse
- Equine coat color genetics
- Horses in Morocco
- Spanish-Norman horse
- Spanish Barb
