= List of German horse breeds =

This is a list of some of the breeds of horse considered in Germany to be wholly or partly of German origin. In 2014 there were 151 horse breeds reported to DAD-IS by Germany, many of them imported from other parts of the world. Only those breeds with some history of development within present-day Germany are listed below. Inclusion here does not necessarily imply that a breed is predominantly or exclusively German.

German name	English name if used	Image	Notes
Aegidienberger			
Arenberg-Nordkirchner	Arenberg-Nordkirchen		
Alt-Württemberger			
Bayerisches Warmblut	Bavarian Warmblood		
Brandenburger Warmblut	Brandenburger		
Deutsches Reitpferd	German Riding Horse		
Deutsches Classic Pony	German Classic Pony		
Deutsches Part-Bred Shetland Pony	German Part-Bred Shetland Pony		
Deutsches Pinto Barockpferd			
Deutsches Polopferd			
Deutsches Reitpony	German Riding Pony		
Deutsches Sportpferd	German Sport Horse		
Dülmener			
Edelbluthaflinger			German-bred Haflingers with 1.56% to 25% Arab blood
Hannoveraner Halbblut			
Hannoveraner Warmblut	Hanoverian		
Hannoversches Kaltblut Schleswiger Ursprungs			Since 2012 a sub-population of the Schleswig Coldblood
Hessisches Warmblut	Hessian Warmblood		Merged with Hanoverian in 2009
Holsteiner Warmblut	Holsteiner		
Internationales Oldenburger Springpferd			
Kleines Deutsches Pony			
Kleines Deutsches Reitpferd			
Lehmkuhlener			
Leonharder			
Leutstettener			
Lewitzer			
Mecklenburger Warmblut	Mecklenburger		
Oldenburger Warmblut	Oldenburger		
Ostpreußisches Warmblut Trakehner Abstammung	Trakehner		Breeding at the Trakehnen stud ended in October 1944; the present German-language name means roughly "East Prussian Warmblood of Trakehner origin"
Pfalz-Ardenner			
Rheinisch Deutsches Kaltblut	Rhenish German Coldblood		
Rheinisches Warmblut	Rhinelander		
Rottaler			
Sachsen-Anhaltiner Warmblut			
Sächsisches Warmblut			see Sächsisch-Thüringisches Schweres Warmblut
Sächsisch-Thüringisches Schweres Warmblut			
Schleswiger Kaltblut	Schleswig Coldblood		
Schwarzwälder Kaltblut	Black Forest Horse		
Schweres Warmblut	Heavy warmblood		
Schweres Warmblut / Ostfriesisch-Altoldenburgisch	Ostfriesen and Alt-Oldenburger		
Senner			
Süddeutsches Kaltblut	South German Coldblood		
Tarpan	Heck Horse		Was created at Berlin Zoo; it is not reported to DAD-IS, nor listed as endangered by the Gesellschaft zur Erhaltung alter und gefährdeter Haustierrassen
Thüringer Warmblut			see Sächsisch-Thüringisches Schweres Warmblut
Traber	Trotter		
Warmblut des Zuchtverbandes für deutsche Pferde			
Warmblutschecken			
Westfälisches Warmblut	Westphalian		
Württemberger Warmblut	Württemberger		
Zweibrücker Warmblut	Zweibrücker		
