= German warmblood =

Breed of horse

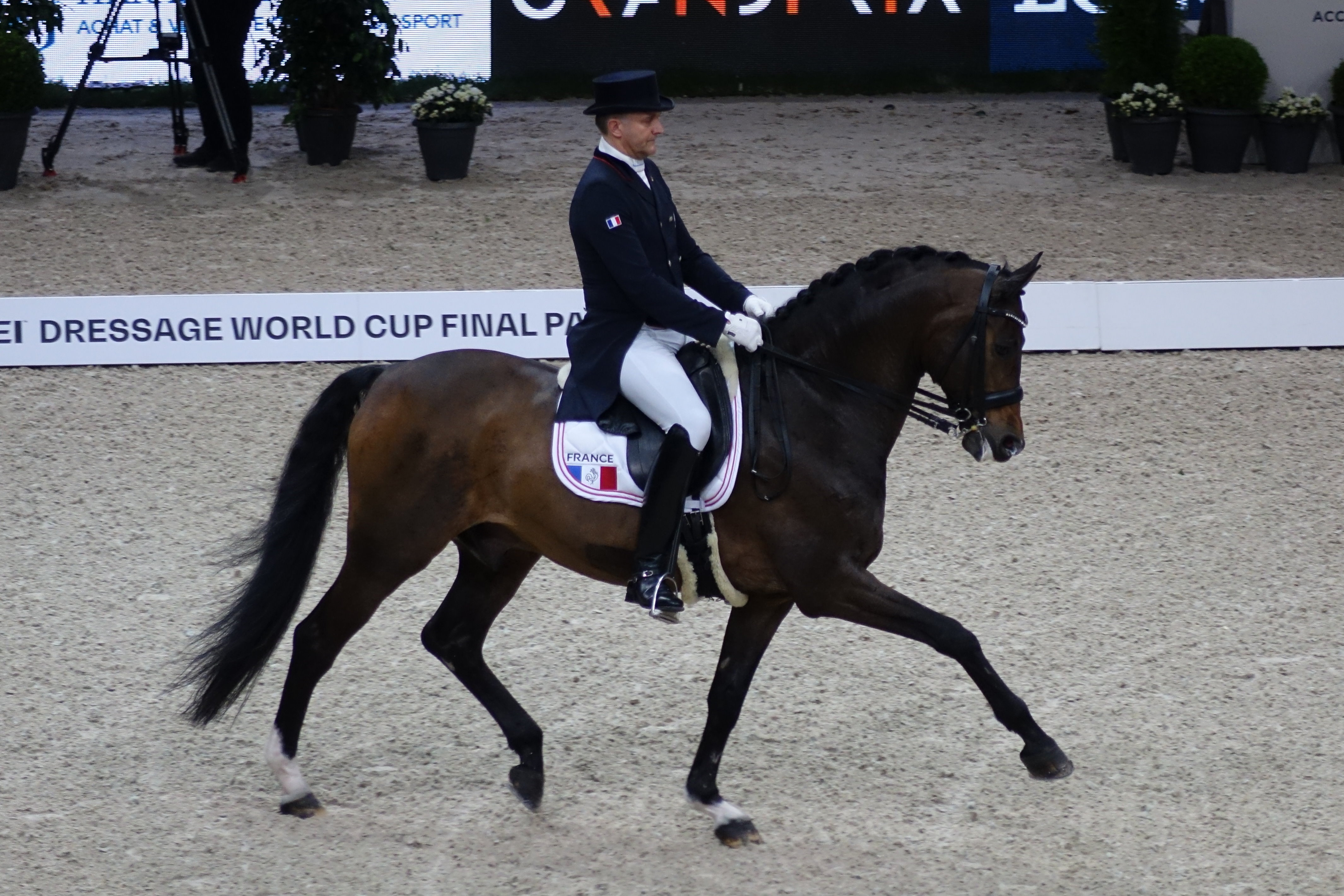
"After You", a Bavarian Warmblood

German warmblood may refer generally to any of the various warmblood horses of Germany, or more specifically to a warmblood registered with the nationwide German Horse Breeding Society. Beneath the umbrella term German warmblood are several regional variations on a singular standard; individual German warmblood types are not necessarily considered "breeds", because they have an open stud book and freely exchange genetic material between each other, with other warmblood types, with Anglo-Arabians, and with breeds like the Thoroughbred, Arabian, and Trakehner. (The Trakehner, while a warmblood horse from Germany, has a closed stud book and thus, like the Thoroughbred and Arabian, is considered a "true" breed.) All horses that are warmbloods and bred in Germany are named after the region in which they are born in. There is an exception to this and that is the Trakehner breed.

== Regions and types ==
Each of the States of Germany has its own local warmblood breeding society, or sometimes more than one. Lower Saxony is the domain of the Oldenburg and Hanoverian breeds, the latter being closely linked to the State Stud of Celle. Formerly, the East Frisian (Ostfriesen) was also bred in that part of Lower Saxony, however most of the breeding stock was absorbed into the Hanoverian gene pool after the Second World War. More recently, the Hessen horse was also made into an extension of the Hanoverian herdbook. The northernmost region of Schleswig-Holstein has the Holsteiner, while Mecklenburg-Vorpommern has the Mecklenburger. North Rhine-Westphalia traditionally breeds both the Westphalian and Rhinelander, which populate the State Stud of Warendorf and which work in close cooperation.

Historically, each of the southern states had a very distinct population: Rhineland-Palatinate was a center for the breeding of elegant Anglo-Arabian riding horses, Baden-Württemberg bred Arabians and Arab-influenced riding horses at the State Stud of Marbach, and Bavaria was home to the ancient heavy warmblood Rottaler. Of late, these three regions have combined their breeding and marketing efforts, so the modern Bavarian Warmblood, Württemberger, and Zweibrücker are increasingly indistinguishable. Similarly, the eastern states of Berlin-Brandenburg, Saxony-Anhalt, Saxony, and Thuringia have begun hosting a common stallion inspection. Each of these states has had its own flavor of warmblood, though perhaps the Brandenburger was best known.

== German warmbloods in their careers ==
In modern times, different breeds of German Warmbloods are becoming popular in the FEI, Olympic Games, World Equestrian Games, and USEF rated shows due to their athleticism. The popular breeds of Oldenburg, Hanoverian, Holsteiner, and Trakehner are being found in different riding areas in the equestrian world. Oldenburgs, with their jumping abilities, can be found in international and local show jumping rings. They are also beginning to pop up in upper-level dressage rings. Hanoverians are well known for their talents in the Olympics. Their breeding allows for them to place in upper-level dressage shows and show jumping shows. Holsteiners have talents that allow them to excel in show jumping, hunt seat, and dressage. Trakehners have certain breeding in them that allows for them to compete in Olympic-level dressage and jumping.

== Breeding ==
The four popular breeds of German Warmbloods are bred with a focus towards their intended discipline, such as hunters, jumpers, and dressage. These breeds experience policies of different breeding, whether it is pure-bred or cross-bred. Trakehners and Holsteiners over the past century have been bred pure. On the other hand, Oldenburgs and Hanoverians are bred with a similar clustering pattern in the PCA (principal component analysis) and iHS (integrated Haplotype Score) selection signatures, leading them to have shared breeding.

== Branding ==
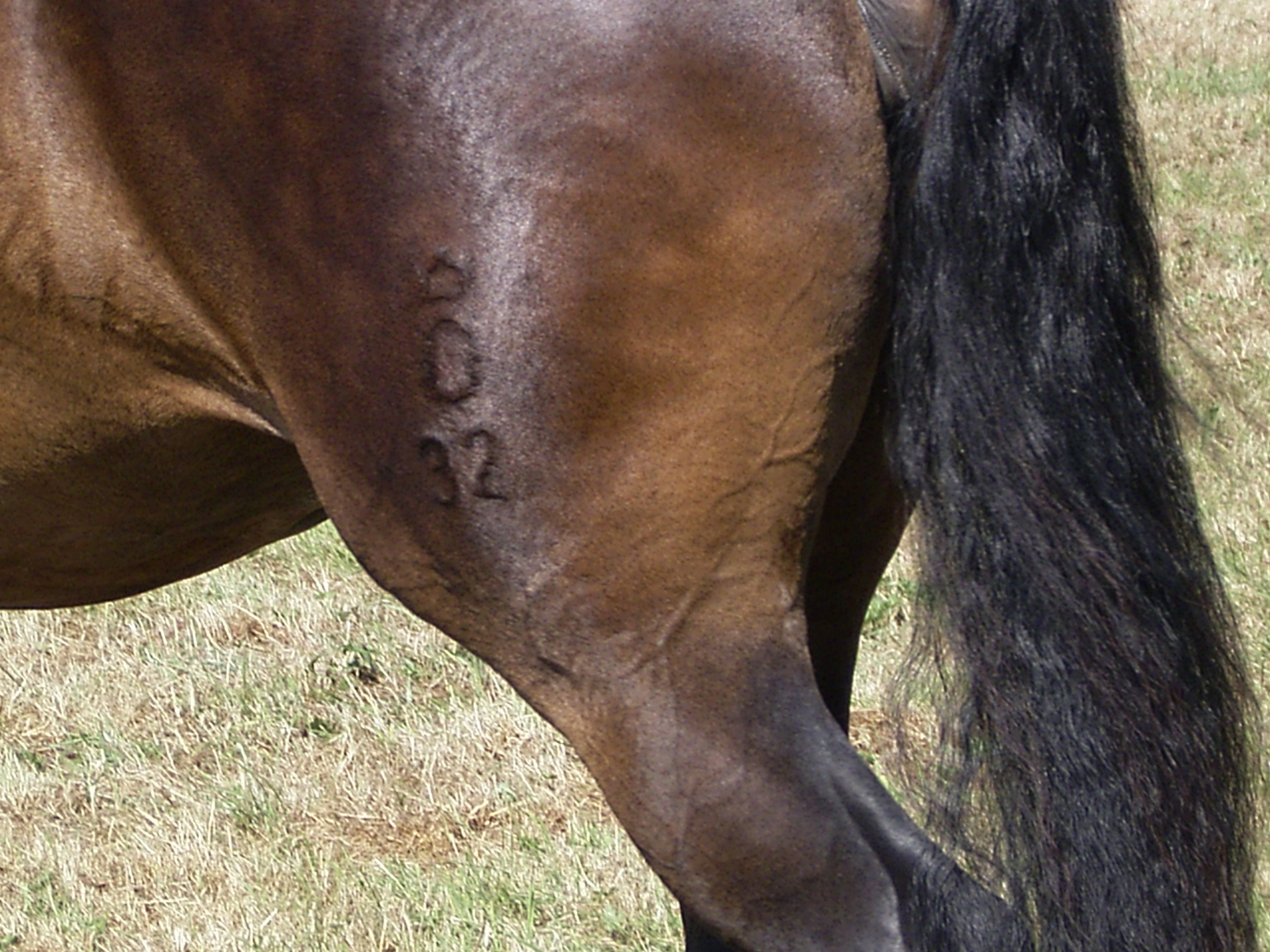
Oldenburger brand

The brands on German Warmbloods are a way for people to know what type of warmblood they are. It also tells people what quality of horse they are looking at and its lineage. To start, the Hanoverian has had several different types of brands, but the most common one used is the H brand. The H brand is made up of two horses necks and heads connected in the middle to form an H. Although this brand was the most popular, Hanoverians are no longer branded in Germany. The Oldenburg brand consists of an "O" that has a crown above it. The crown is a way for the breeder to signify the Oldenburg's royal origins. The next German Warmblood, the Holsteiner, has a similar brand to the Hanoverian but with variations. The brand consists of the H brand, which was once used on Hanoverians, inside a shield with a line above it. Finally the Trakehner, this horse breed has an interesting brand background. Its brand can be traced back to the world-famous farm in Trakehnen, East Prussia. This farm was established by King Friedrich Wilhelm l of Prussia as the Main Stud in 1732. The Trakehner brand consists of moose antlers. If the horse was born in Trakehnen it is branded with a single moose antler and if the horse is born outside Trakehnen it is branded with two moose antlers.

== See also ==
- Warmblood
- Breed registry
- Studbook selection
