= Stud farm =

Establishment for selective breeding of livestock

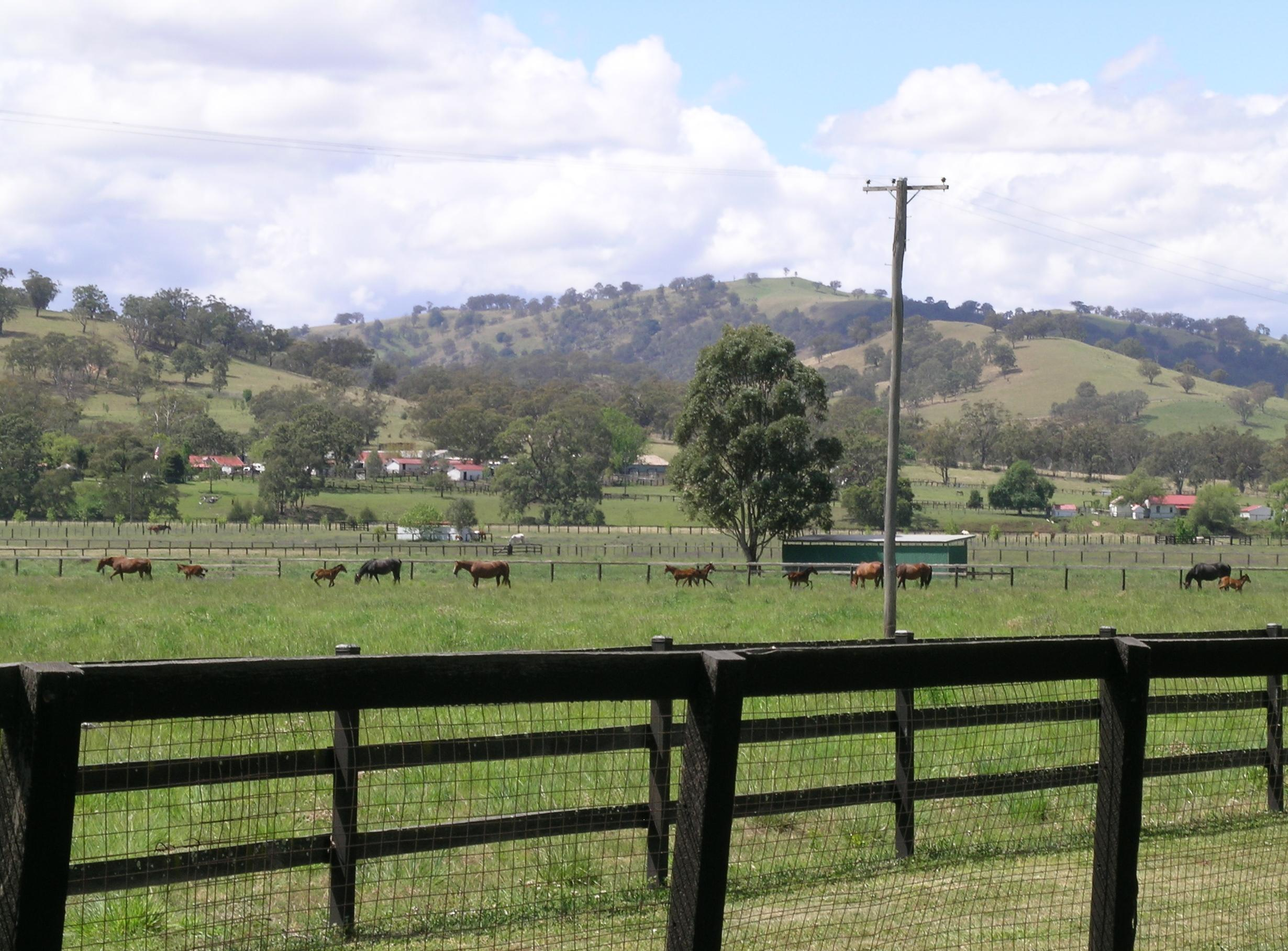
A Thoroughbred horse stud farm, Murrurundi, New South Wales

A stud farm or stud in animal husbandry is an establishment for selective breeding of livestock. The word "stud" comes from the Old English stod meaning "herd of horses, place where horses are kept for breeding". Historically, documentation of the breedings that occur on a stud farm leads to the development of a stud book. Male animals made available for breeding to outside female animals are said to be "standing at stud", or at "stud service".

The word stud is often restricted to larger domesticated (especially farm) animals, such as cattle and horses. A specialized vocabulary exists for the studs of other animals, such as kennel (dog), cattery (cat) and aviary (birds).

== Horse stud farms ==
=== Monastic stud farms ===
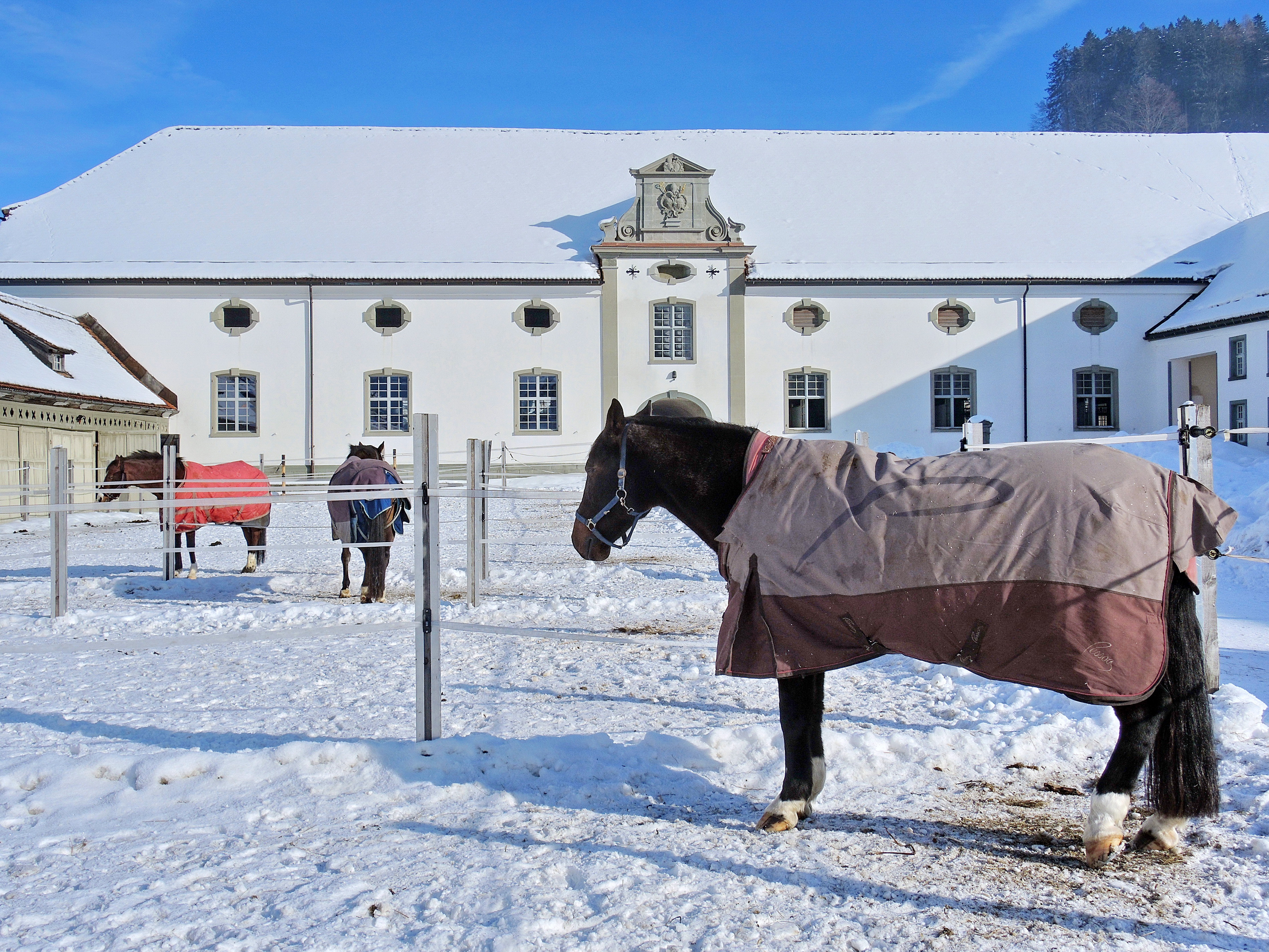
Einsiedeln Mews with Cavalli della Madonna horses

During the Middle Ages, stud farms were often managed as part of a monastery. At the time, few people apart from monks could read and write, and so they were charged with the responsibility of recording pedigrees. The Carthusian monks are famous for their role in breeding the Andalusian horse in Spain, while monasteries in Bavaria were responsible for the original Rottaler horse. The oldest stud farm in Europe still in existence today is the Mews of Einsiedeln Abbey (1064) in Switzerland where Einsiedler horses are bred.

=== State stud farms ===
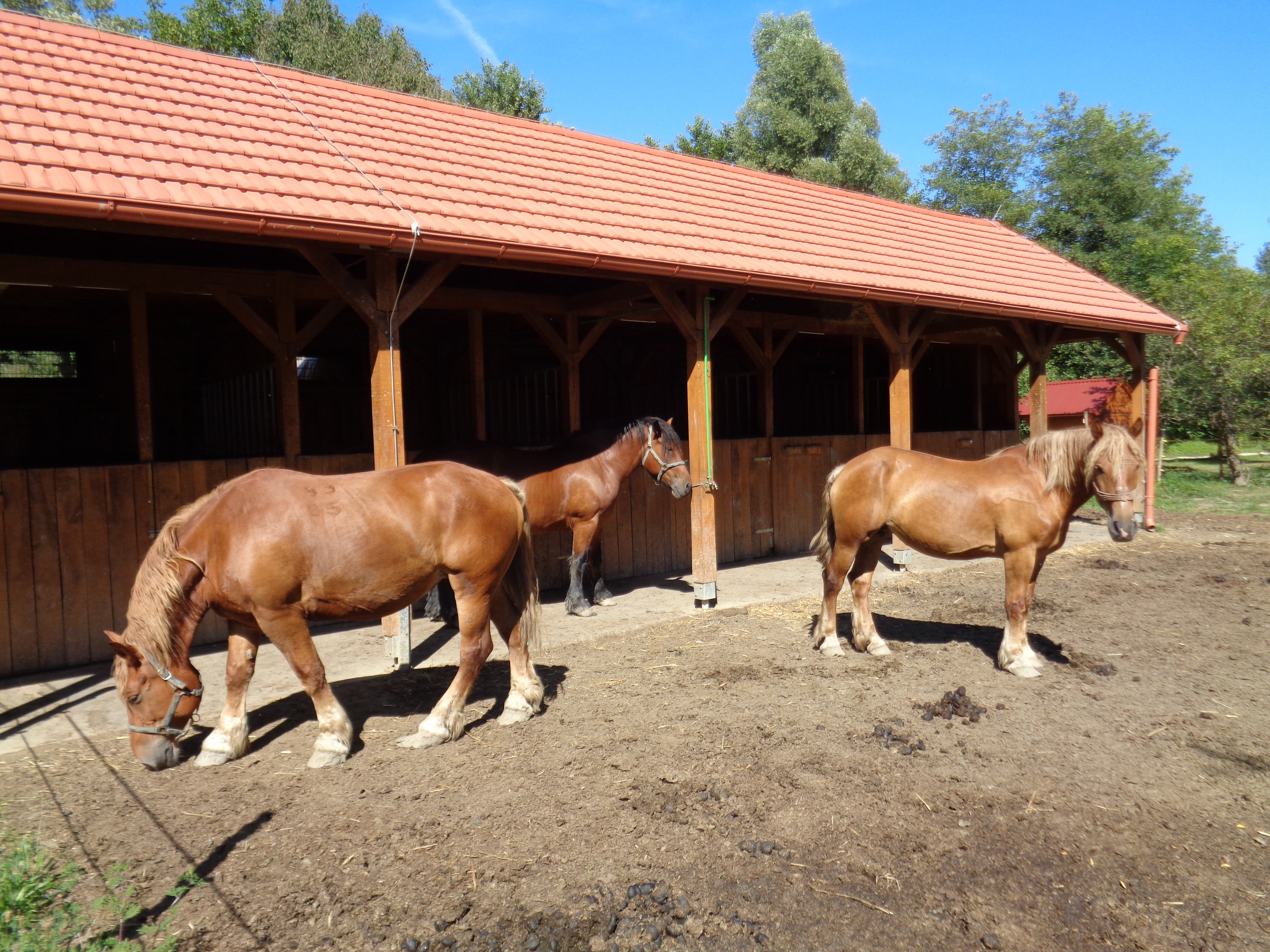
The Međimurje Horse Stud, Žabnik at Sveti Martin na Muri, in Croatia, is owned by the Međimurje nature public institution.

A state stud farm (German: Landgestüt, French: Haras) is one owned by the government. The first state studs were ordered by Louis XIV of France in 1665. The purpose of the state studs was to make high-quality horses available to local breeders and farmers to accelerate the evolution of local horses. Stud farms which kept a herd of mares in addition to stallions were dubbed "Principal" Studs. State-owned stallions were made accessible with low or no stud fees. Germany is most famous for its Principal and State Studs, which have been instrumental in the shaping of the German riding horses and several breeds of German cold bloods. The Hanoverian is associated with the State Stud of Celle, the Rhinelander and Westphalian with the State Stud of Warendorf, the Brandenburger with the Principal Stud of Neustadt an der Dosse, and so on.

Other European state studs include:

- Haras national du Pin, the first state stud created in France
- Lipizza (1580) of Inner Austria (now Lipica, Slovenia), known for the Lipizzaner horse
- Kladrub (1579), another state stud established by Austria at Kladruby nad Labem, in what is now the Czech Republic, which breeds the Kladruber
- Mezőhegyes (1784) of Hungary
- Bábolna (1789) of Hungary, which breeds the Arabian horse, the Shagya Arabian and others
- Radautz (1792) of Austria (present day Romania)
- Piber Federal Stud (1798) of Austria, began as a military depot, since 1920 known for breeding the Lipizzaner horse
- Janów Podlaski Stud Farm (1817) in Poland, best known for breeding purebred Arabians.
- Kisbér (1853) of Hungary
- The Irish National Stud (1946), which breeds Thoroughbreds
- Michałów (1953) of Poland, which breeds Arabians.
- Marbach stud, (1477) also known as Weil-Marbach, Württemberg (present day Germany). Produces Arabians, Black Forest Horses, Haflingers, and warmbloods
- Trakehnen, in East Prussia, now Russia, home of the Trakehner
- Yeguada Militar, Spain
- Coudelaria de Alter Real, in Central Portugal, which breeds Lusitano (Lusitano) Horses

The German city of "Stuttgart" gets its name from stud farms.

=== Private stud farms ===
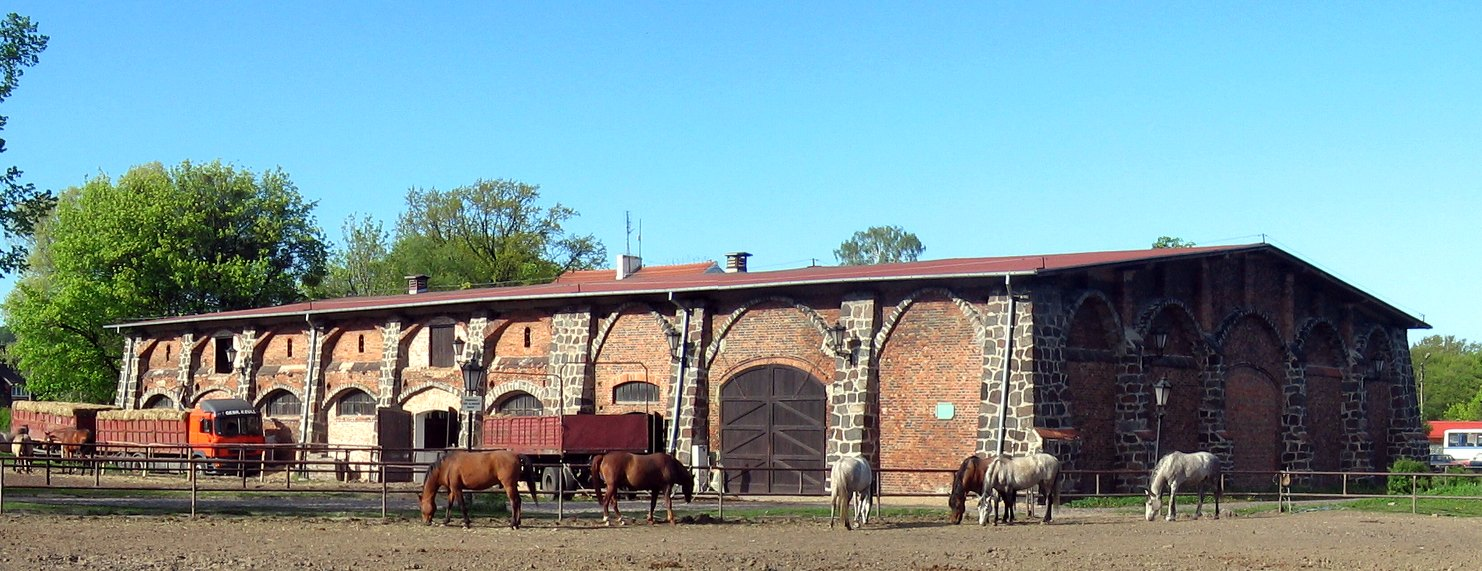
A large stud farm in Gdynia, Poland

Around the world, private individuals have farms dedicated to animal breeding, usually of purebred livestock. Some of the largest and most impressive are those dedicated to Thoroughbred horse breeding, such as the historic Claiborne Farm in Kentucky or the Darley Stud, owned by Dubai Sheikh Mohammed bin Rashid Al Maktoum, which stands over fifty stallions at stud in facilities located in seven countries.

== Stud service ==
Many stud farms make male animals available for breeding to outside female animals that are not owned by the stud farm. Doing so provides an outside source of revenue to a stud farm via the stud fees paid to obtain the services of the stud animal as well as contributing to the overall genetic diversity of the animal's offspring. At state stud farms, stud service is not only a source of income, but due to the high standards set for breeding animals, has an overall effect of improving the quality of animals throughout an area.

In most cases, the owner of the female brings the animal to the stud farm for breeding, sometimes leaving her there for over a month to be sure that pregnancy has occurred. However, with the invention of artificial insemination and the ability to ship semen, combined with the availability of DNA testing for parentage verification, many breed registries allow semen to be shipped from the stud farm to the location of the female animal, thus reducing or eliminating the need for animals to travel and stay away from their farm.

== Stud manager ==
A stud manager or "stud master" is an individual responsible for an employer's breeding stock. The term is usually used for individuals working with dogs or horses. It is usually applied regardless of gender.

The stud manager typically suggests desired matings to the owner, and arranges for the same, whether in-house or by contract with animals standing at stud elsewhere, approves and arranges matings to the owner's animals at stud requested by outsiders, and keeps all records, including notifying the appropriate animal registries.

In a European large or formal household the "Stud Master" or manager may be a permanent title and position; in this case this individual is often responsible for overseeing the maintenance of the stables and kennels as well. Most large stud farms have a full-time individual assigned to stallion management, but many stud managers have either a part-time or contractual arrangement or their duties as stud manager may be incorporated with those of the overall farm or stable manager.

== See also ==
- Horse breeding
