= Brandenburger =

German breed of horse

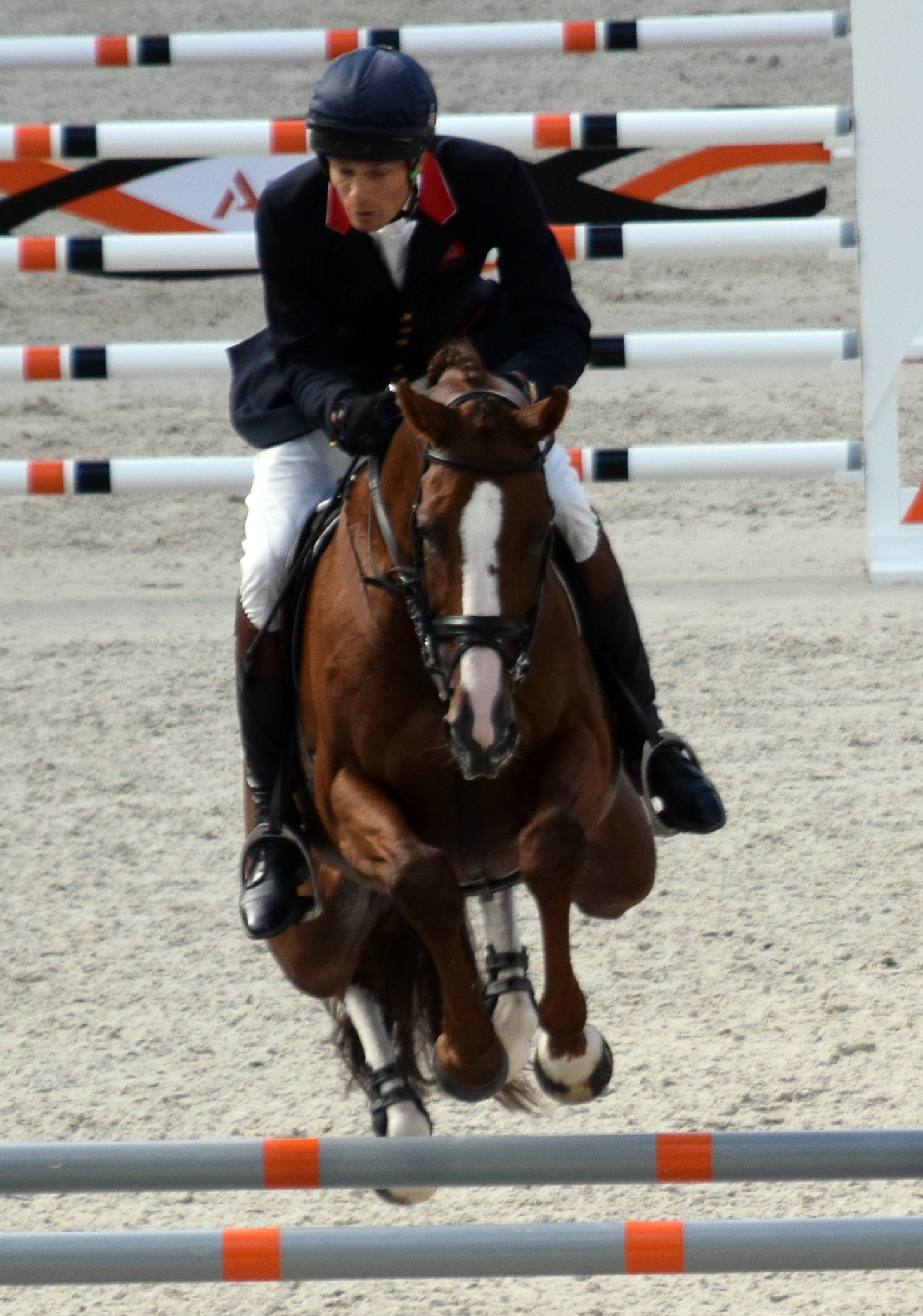
- Conservation status: FAO (2007): not at risk; DAD-IS (2024): unknown
- Other names: Brandenburger Warmblut; Brandenburg
- Country of origin: Germany
- Use: dressage; show-jumping; three-day event

Traits
- Height: 162–177 cm
- Colour: solid colours

The Brandenburger is a German breed of warmblood sport horse from the state of Brandenburg in north-eastern Germany. From the 1960s – when Brandenburg was in East Germany – it was included in the stud-book of the Edles Warmblut or 'light warmblood'. Following the re-unification of Germany it again had its own stud-book. In 2003 it was included in the stud-book of the Deutsches Reitpferd, which also included the Sachsen-Anhaltiner Warmblut, the Sächsisches Warmblut and the Thüringer Warmblut; the Bavarian Warmblood, the Württemberger and the Zweibrücker were added to it in 2014.

Like other German warmblood breeds, it is bred to compete in dressage, in show-jumping and in the three-day event. The successful dressage mare Poetin was a Brandenburger.

== History ==
The Brandenburger originates in the Margraviate of Brandenburg, where horse-breeding is documented from the fifteenth century. It is closely associated with the Hauptgestüt Neustadt, established in 1788 by the Prussian king Friedrich Wilhelm II in Neustadt, in the landkreis of Ostprignitz-Ruppin in north-western Brandenburg. It was bred principally as a military mount.

A breed association, the Verband Brandenburger Warmblutzüchter, was established in 1922, and a stud-book was started; the association was dissolved in 1949, after the end of the Second World War. From the 1960s, when Germany was divided and Brandenburg was in East Germany, the Brandenburger and the Mecklenburger were merged in the stud-book of the Edles Warmblut or 'light warmblood'; there was some cross-breeding with Hanoverian, Thoroughbred and Trakehner stock.

After the fall of the Berlin Wall and the re-unification of Germany, a new association – the Pferdezuchtverband Berlin-Brandenburg e.V. – was formed; in 2007 this merged with the Pferdezuchtverband Sachsen-Anhalt e.V. to form the Pferdezuchtverband Brandenburg-Anhalt e.V. From 2003 the Brandenburger was included in the stud-book of the Deutsches Reitpferd, which also included the Sachsen-Anhaltiner Warmblut, the Sächsisches Warmblut and the Thüringer Warmblut; to these the Bavarian Warmblood, the Württemberger and the Zweibrücker were added in 2014.

In the early twenty-first century there were approximately 70 stallions and 1600 mares registered.

== Characteristics ==
As with other European warmblood sport horses, the Brandenburger is bred for performance and not for specific physical characteristics. The horses usually stand between 162 and 177 cm at the withers and are solid-coloured apart from the usual white markings.

== Uses ==
Like other German warmblood breeds, the Brandenburger is bred to compete in dressage, in show-jumping and in the three-day event. The successful dressage mare Poetin was of this breed.

== See also ==
- List of German horse breeds
