= Rhinelander horse =

German horse breed

Rhinelander
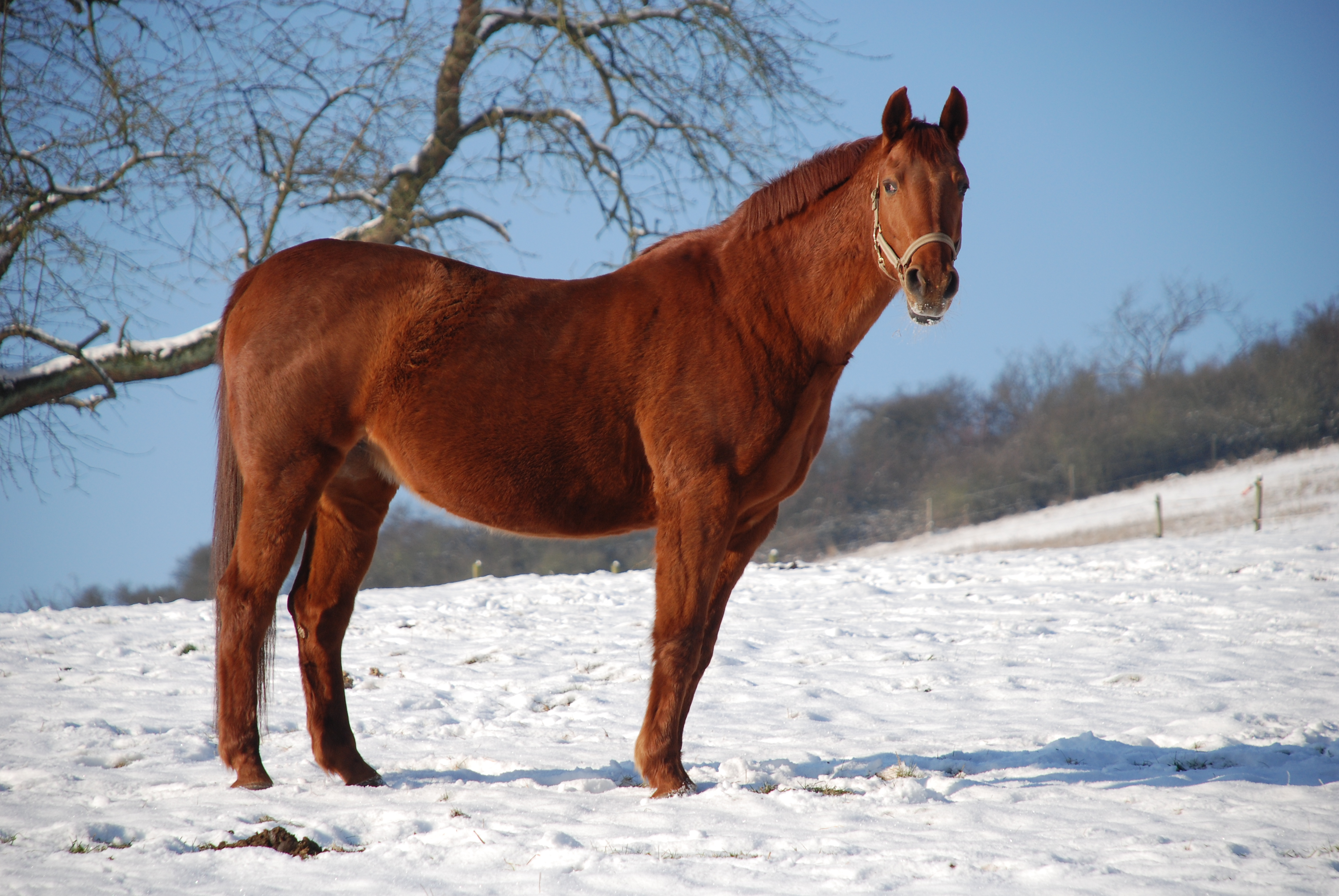

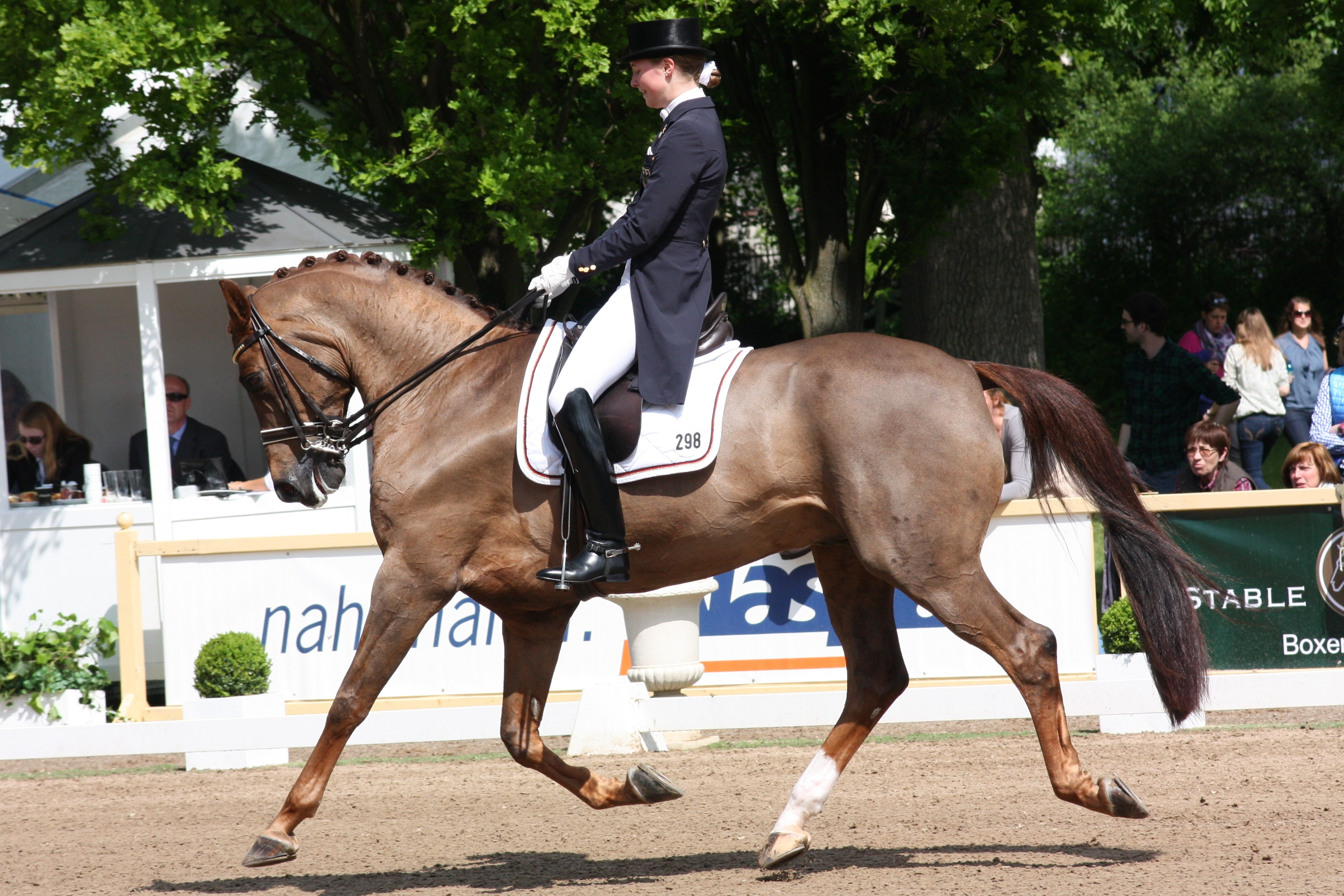
- Conservation status: FAO (2007): not at risk; DAD-IS (2024): unknown
- Other names: Rheinisches Reitpferd; Rheinisches Warmblut; Rhenish Warmblood; Rheinländer; Rhinelander; Rhineland Riding Horse
- Country of origin: Germany

Traits
- Height: at least 158 cm (15.2h)

Breed standards
- Rheinisches Reitpferd in Hannoveraner Verband (Germany); American Rhinelander in the American Hanoverian Society; British Rhinelander in the British Hanoverian Horse Society; Australian Rhinelander in the Hanoverian Horse Society of Australia; New Zealand Rhinelander in the New Zealand Hanoverian Society

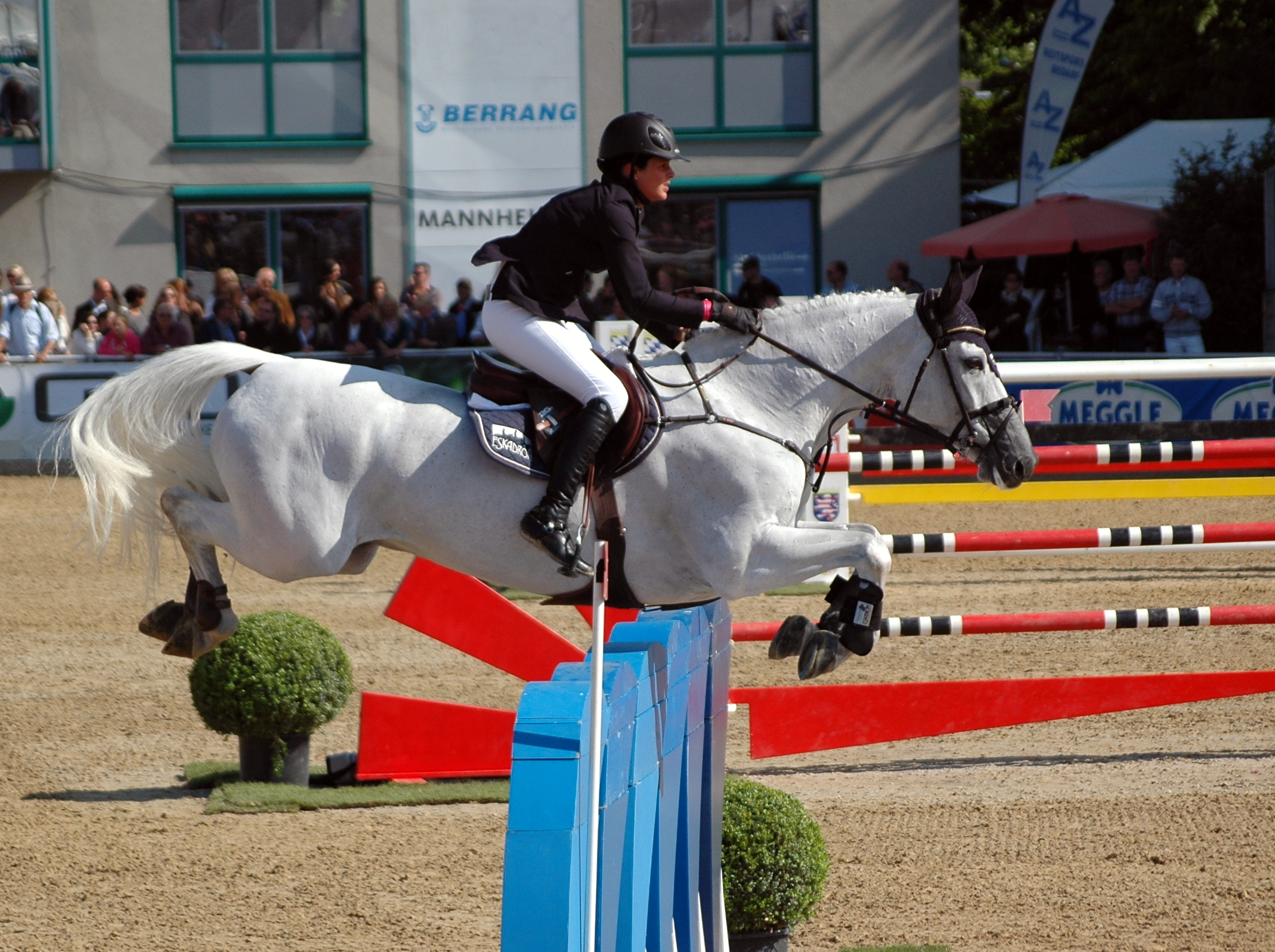
Show jumping

The Rhinelander, or Rheinisches Reitpferd, is a German warmblood breed of sport horse. It is traditionally bred at the Warendorf State Stud, which it shares with the Westphalian, and is bred to the same standard as the Westphalian and other German warmbloods, such as the Bavarian Warmblood, Mecklenburger, Brandenburger, and Württemberger.

== Characteristics ==
The breed averages 160-170 cm and is mainly bay with some chestnut, black and gray. It has a straight profile head, long slender neck, and prominent withers. It has an athletic physique, good gaits, and jumps well.

The breed standard calls for a horse of correct sport horse type that is long-lined, fitting into a rectangular outline rather than a square, and noble, a term that suggests aesthetic appeal that does not entail extreme refinement. In motion, the Rhinelander should portray boldness, a long stride, and an elastic quality at the walk, trot, and canter. The temperament, character and rideability of the Rhinelander make it suitable for any type of recreational or competitive riding. These horses are primarily bred for dressage and show jumping.

== Breed history ==
Until the mid-twentieth century, horse-breeding in the Rhineland was centred on the Rhenish German Coldblood, the heavy agricultural workhorse of the region. With the mechanisation of agriculture and after the Second World War, draft horses were no longer needed and numbers fell sharply. When the Wickrath State Stud at Schloss Wickrath closed in 1957, breeding riding horses had been gaining economic and cultural importance in Germany. From the 1970s Rhenish breeders and farmers began to develop a new warmblood breed based on Westphalian, Hanoverian and Trakehner stock.

The new breed was registered with the Rheinische Pferdestammbuch (established in 1892) until 2014, when the Hannoveraner Verband – the German breed association of the Hanoverian – took over management of the stud-book.

In 1997 there were just over 3,500 broodmares registered in the stud-book, with 178 stallions in service;. Gradually declining, by 2006 the number of broodmares was around 2,800, and by 2020 the breeding population consisted of 618 mares and 8 stallions.

== Uses ==
The Rhinelander is mainly bred for show jumping and dressage.
