= Zweibrücker =

Breed of horse

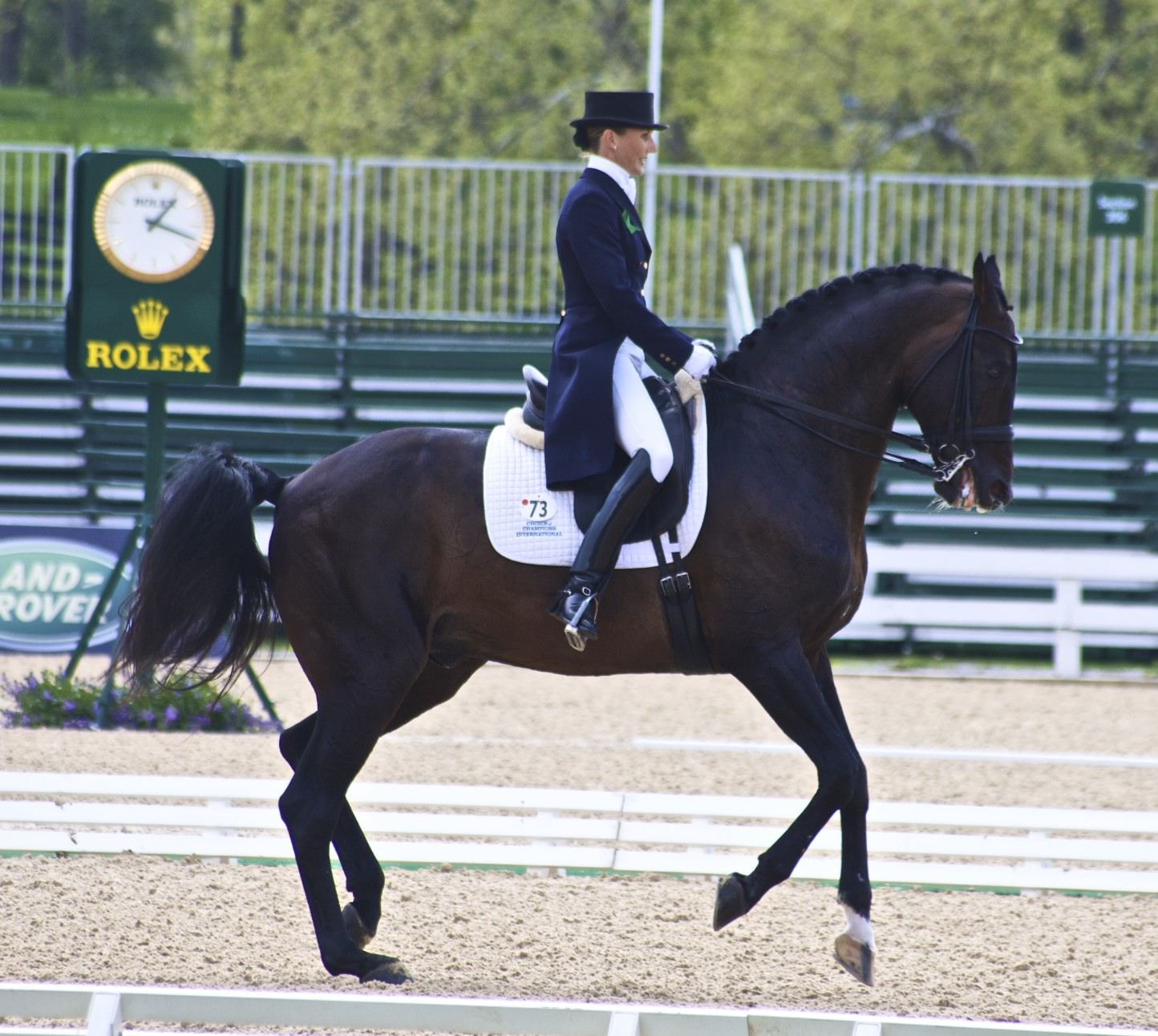

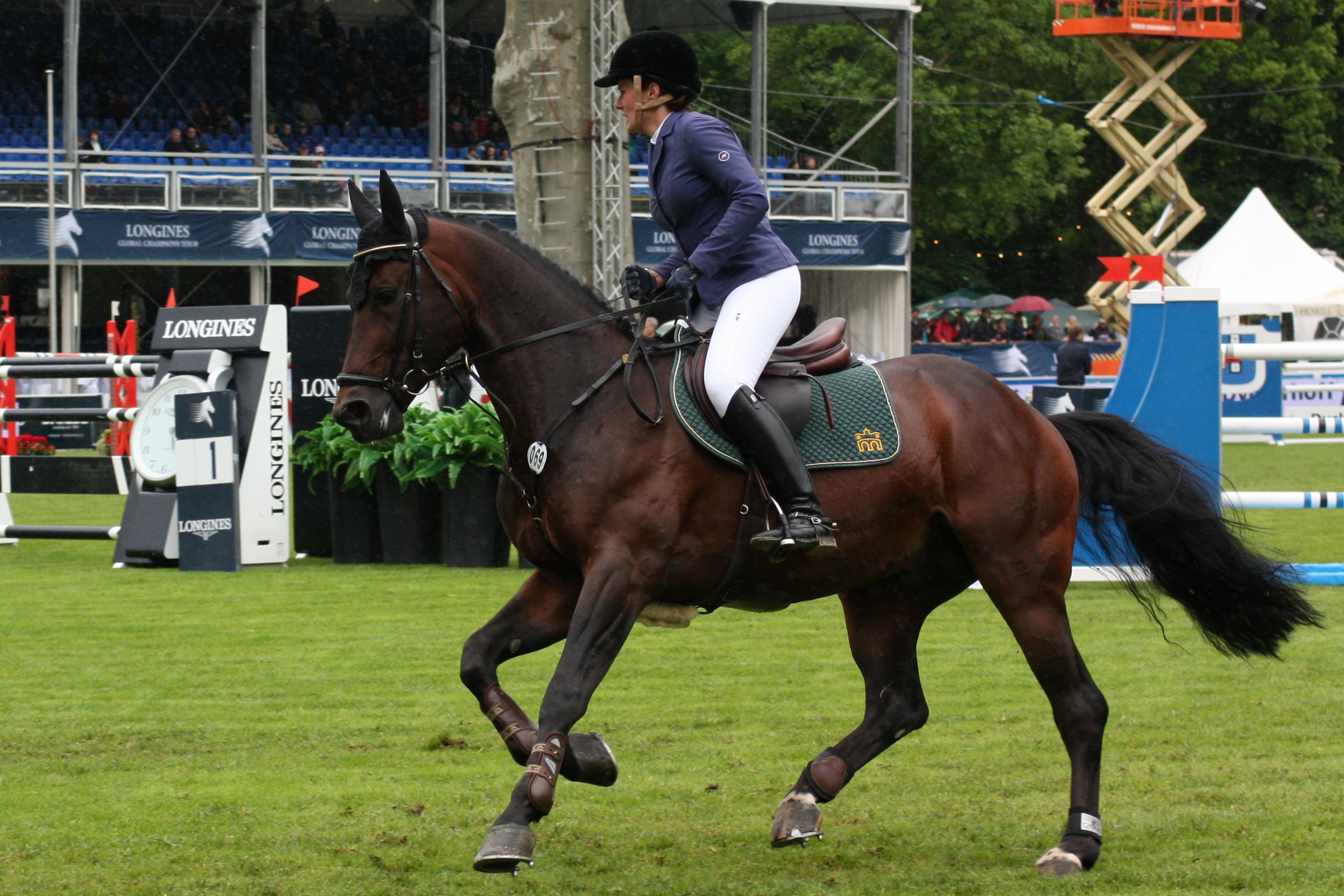
- Other names: Zweibruecker (pl. Zweibruecken); ZW, RPSI, PRPS
- Country of origin: Rhineland-Palatinate and Saarland, Germany

Traits
- Distinguishing features: German sport horse used for dressage, show jumping, eventing, show hunters, and combined driving.

Breed standards
- Horse Breeders' Association of Rhineland-Palatinate-Saar; Rheinland-Pfalz Saar International

Notes
- Brand is two joined bridges (German: zwei brücken) under the crown placed on left hind leg.

The Zweibrücker (pl. Zweibrücken) is a type of German warmblood horse bred in Rhineland-Palatinate and Saarland. Traditionally, the breeding of Zweibrücken was centered on the onetime Principal Stud of Zweibrücken but since 1977 has been under the jurisdiction of the Horse Breeders' Association of Rhineland-Palatinate-Saar (PRPS). The modern Zweibrücker is an elegant, large-framed, correct sport horse with powerful, elastic gaits suitable for dressage, show jumping, eventing and combined driving.

== Characteristics ==
The best way to identify a Zweibrücker is by the brand on the left hind leg. It features the two bridges of the city of Zweibrücken topped by a representation of the duke's crown. Otherwise, it is not possible to distinguish a Zweibrücker from a German Warmblood bred elsewhere based solely on appearance. All German Warmblood registries exchange genetic material in an effort to continuously improve their own horses.

Most Zweibrücken are middle-weight horses with "old style" examples heavier set than those deemed "modern" in type. The ideal height is 160 to 170 cm or 15.3 to 16.3hh at the age of 3, but deviations in either direction are not uncommon nor are they disqualifying. The most common colors are bay, chestnut, gray, and black, however several breeders of colored warmbloods have chosen to register their horses as Zweibrücken, so there are tobiano pintos and colors such as palomino, buckskin, and cremello.

The Anglo-Arabian ancestry of the Zweibrücker is found primarily in what remains of its old female families. Today, the Horse Breeders' Association of Rhineland-Palatinate-Saar is known for its liberal pedigree policies, accepting breeding stock from most other warmblood studbooks which are members of the World Breeding Federation for Sport Horses.

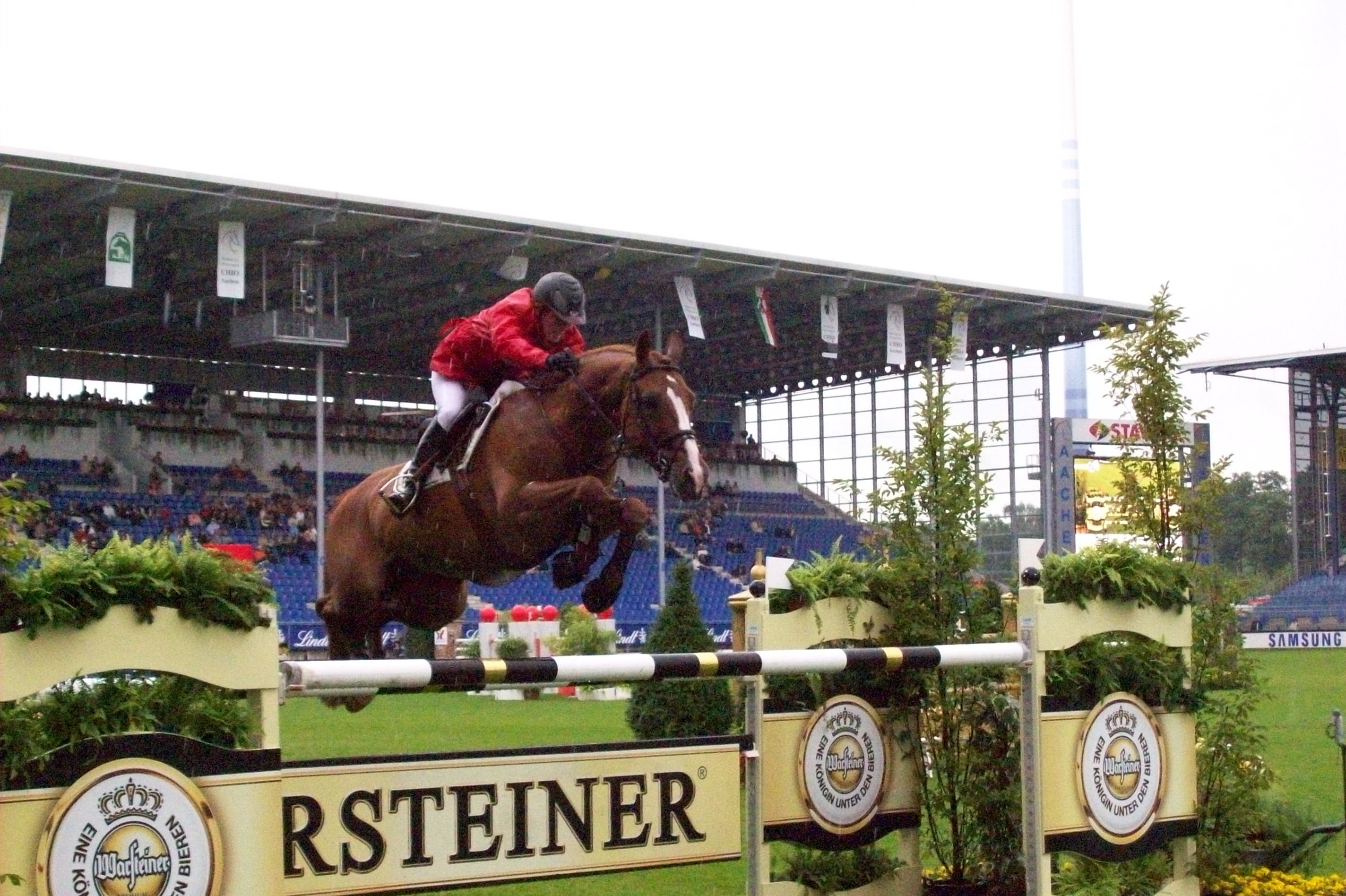
A Zweibrücker horse performing show jumping

The breeding objective, based on market demands, is currently a horse suitable for dressage, jumping, and eventing, though combined driving is also mentioned. In North America, the breeding objective includes suitability for show hunter competition, as well.

Zweibrücken share the standard of German Riding or Sport Horse with their parallels in other regions. Ideally, the horse is characterized by a noble expression, with long-lined and correct conformation. The head is dry, expressive, and aesthetically appealing though need not have out of the ordinary refinement. The topline is long, generous, and slightly curved featuring a medium-length neck set on rather high, a stark, laid-back wither and long sloping shoulder. The loin is well-muscled, the croup is long, slightly tilted, and muscular. The horse stands on a foundation of dry, large joints and correct limbs ending in correct, hard hooves of sufficient size.

In motion the gaits are correct - no deviations when viewed from the front or rear - and expansive with a pure rhythm and suggestive of great work ethic. The qualities of freedom, elasticity, and power are paramount. The walk swings through the neck and back, while the trot is cadenced and powerful. Suspension and elasticity are effects of the ability of the horse's joints to store energy and absorb shock, thus are influential in soundness. The canter is important as an indicator of jumping suitability, and should be cadenced, balanced and powerful.

Zweibrücken, especially stallions, are typically evaluated over fences through free jumping, where the horse is let loose in a chute with specifically measured obstacles. This allows judges to draw conclusions about the horse's jumping abilities without pushing them too fast under saddle. Judges look for a horse which is capable of jumping, having an appearance of ease and confidence as he jumps, without any carelessness. The rhythm of the canter should remain unchanged while the horse adjusts his stride length to leave the ground from the correct place. The fore and hind limbs should be drawn up close to the body, which should pass close to the obstacle, while the spine forms a convex arc over the jump called "bascule".

As part of the approval process, stallions and often mares are evaluated in controlled conditions on their personality traits or "interior qualities". This information allows breeders to choose mates properly. The horses with the best marks for interior qualities have kind, personable temperaments, are uncomplicated to ride, strong-nerved and reliable but alert and intelligent. Another quality, called "rideability", is a measure of how comfortable and simple the horse is to ride. High rideability is coveted by amateur riders in particular.

== Breed history ==
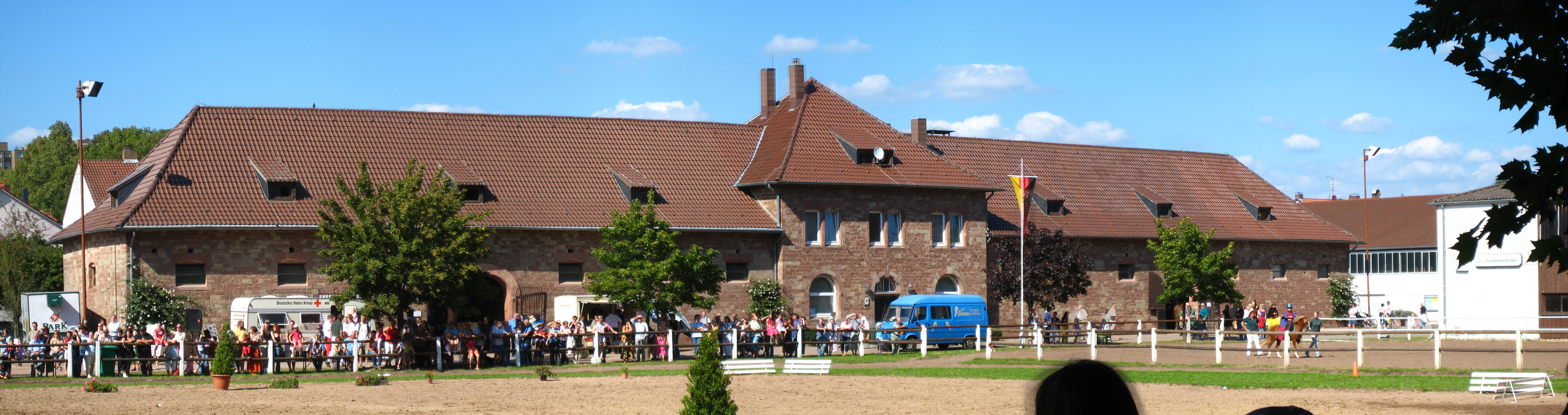
The State Stud of Zweibrücken

The Rhineland-Palatinate state-owned stud facilities of Zweibrücken house the smallest number of state stallions in Germany, but the region's horse-breeding history is rich. The modern city of Zweibrücken, meaning "two bridges", was a county throughout the Middle Ages and then later on became a duchy of the Holy Roman Empire. The state stud was founded in 1755 by Duke Christian IV following a visit to England. While abroad he admired the refined, spirited English Thoroughbreds, as a breed less than 100 years old at the time. When Christian IV returned to Zweibrücken, he financed the establishment of "royal facilities" throughout the region, populating them with noble stallions and mares.

Christian IV's successor, Charles II August, continued to improve horse-breeding in politically influential Zweibrücken by decreeing that the horses bred there ought to be "good, handsome and useful". This goal was achieved to the effect of gaining the admiration of the King of Prussia, who purchased over 150 Zweibrücken stallions. These sires were sent to the Principal Stud of Trakehnen where the Trakehner was bred for use by the Prussian nobles.

In 1801, Zweibrücken was annexed by France, and the noble horses were moved to Rosiers aux Salines. However, Napoleon saw the stallion and mare herds at Zweibrücken Principal Stud re-established in 1806. The central facility and its many outposts and stallion depots were populated with more than 250 stallions and a herd of over 100 mares purchased from notable German breeding outfits, as well as fashionable Spanish horses and products of the formidable Austro-Hungarian empire. Less than a decade later, Zweibrücken was given to Maximilian I Joseph of Bavaria, and Zweibrücken was retitled in 1890 as the Principal Royal Bavarian State Stud. During this period, large numbers of Anglo-Normans - Thoroughbred-influenced agricultural horses from France - and Arabians were stationed in Zweibrücken. The first organized breeding of Anglo-Arabian horses occurred at Zweibrücken during this time period. The region became widely known for its refined cavalry horses which combined the size and speed of the Thoroughbred with the more tractable temperament of the Arabian. By 1900, the Principal Stud of Zweibrücken comprised more than 250 head of breeding stock and young horses, 74 of which were state-owned stallions.

The first half of the 20th century was marked by increasing demands for a heavier all-purpose farm horse, which were used extensively in the first World War for pulling artillery wagons. Consequently, the refined riding horses were replaced by heavy warmbloods from Oldenburg. During World War II, the entire city was evacuated and the horses brought to Bavaria. Much of the city was destroyed, and the state stud facilities came under the jurisdiction of the newly formed German federal state of Rhineland-Palatinate. Nearly a quarter of the 58 stallions standing at Zweibrücken were draft horses.

Zweibrücken lost the status of Principal Stud - which keeps a herd of mares in addition to standing stallions - in 1960. As the demand for an athletic riding horse blossomed, the draft horse stallions were replaced by Trakehners. From 1966 to 1976, Trakehner stallions comprised half the stallion roster. Unlike most of the State Studs of Germany, the period for which Zweibrücken stood heavy warmblood stallions was brief; the chief focus of this region has been steadily focused on an elegant riding horse since its construction. Gradually, sires from Hanoverian and Holsteiner bloodlines joined the noble Trakehners, accelerating the local horse-breeding efforts towards the production of a warmblood riding horse.

Organized breeding through much of the history of Rhineland-Palatinate and Saarland was managed by the State Stud. The Horse Breeders' Association of Rhineland-Palatinate-Saar (PRPS) was formed in 1977 and directs the breeding of almost all horse breeds within the region. The breed with the largest population within the studbooks is the German Riding or Sport Horse, called the Zweibrücker. The PRPS cooperates with similar associations in Bavaria, Baden-Württemberg, Saxony and Thuringia, collectively licensing and approving breeding stock.

Like other German Warmbloods, the breeding of Zweibrücken is characterized by stringent inspection criteria. Foals do not receive their papers until they are presented at a local foal show, at which judges may exclude any foal if it is markedly off-type. Along with their papers, the foals receive a brand on the left hind leg, just behind the stifle. Foal inspections also give an early indication of the quality of the sire, as well as which mares match best with him. At the age of 3, fillies may be upgraded from the foal register to the herd book through a process called Stutbuchaufnahmen or "Marebook Recording". There are several levels of mare book based on the quality of the mare and the completeness of her pedigree, which allows mares of unorthodox breeding to eventually become part of the breeding program. To be written into the herd book and thereby have registered foals, the mare is evaluated on her conformation and gaits. Mares which fail to meet the criteria may be placed in a lower mare book, or be denied altogether. Only mares in the highest mare books can produce breeding stallion sons.

While mares can be entered into the studbook at local shows, the process of having a young stallion approved for breeding is lengthy. Stallion candidates are often identified as foals, and at the age of 2 and a half the best colts attend the licensing in Munich, Bavaria. There they are evaluated along with stallion hopefuls - köraspirants - branded Bavarian Warmblood, Württemberger and Saxony-Thuringian, along with some representatives from other regions. As all of these regions have a common goal in warmblood breeding, they are judged to the same standard. They are evaluated in terms of their conformational correctness, type, gaits and ability free-jumping. The best young stallions receive a temporary license which is accepted by all of the south-German breeding associations. The stallion has a period of a few years during which he must prove himself in performance, and in this way he earns full approval.

This process is common to all German Warmbloods, and is quite similar to the studbook selection process used for other Warmbloods, as well.

Today many of the stallion depots and outposts lie in France, while others were purchased by separate entities. Most notable among these was the facility at Birkhausen, which was bought by the Trakehner verband and from which Abiza, dam of the Canadian-born Trakehner Abdullah, was sold. The grounds of the state stud host stallion parades and the month-long stallion performance test for the regional breeding association.

== See also ==
- Warmblood
- List of horse breeds
