= Rottaler =

German breed of horse

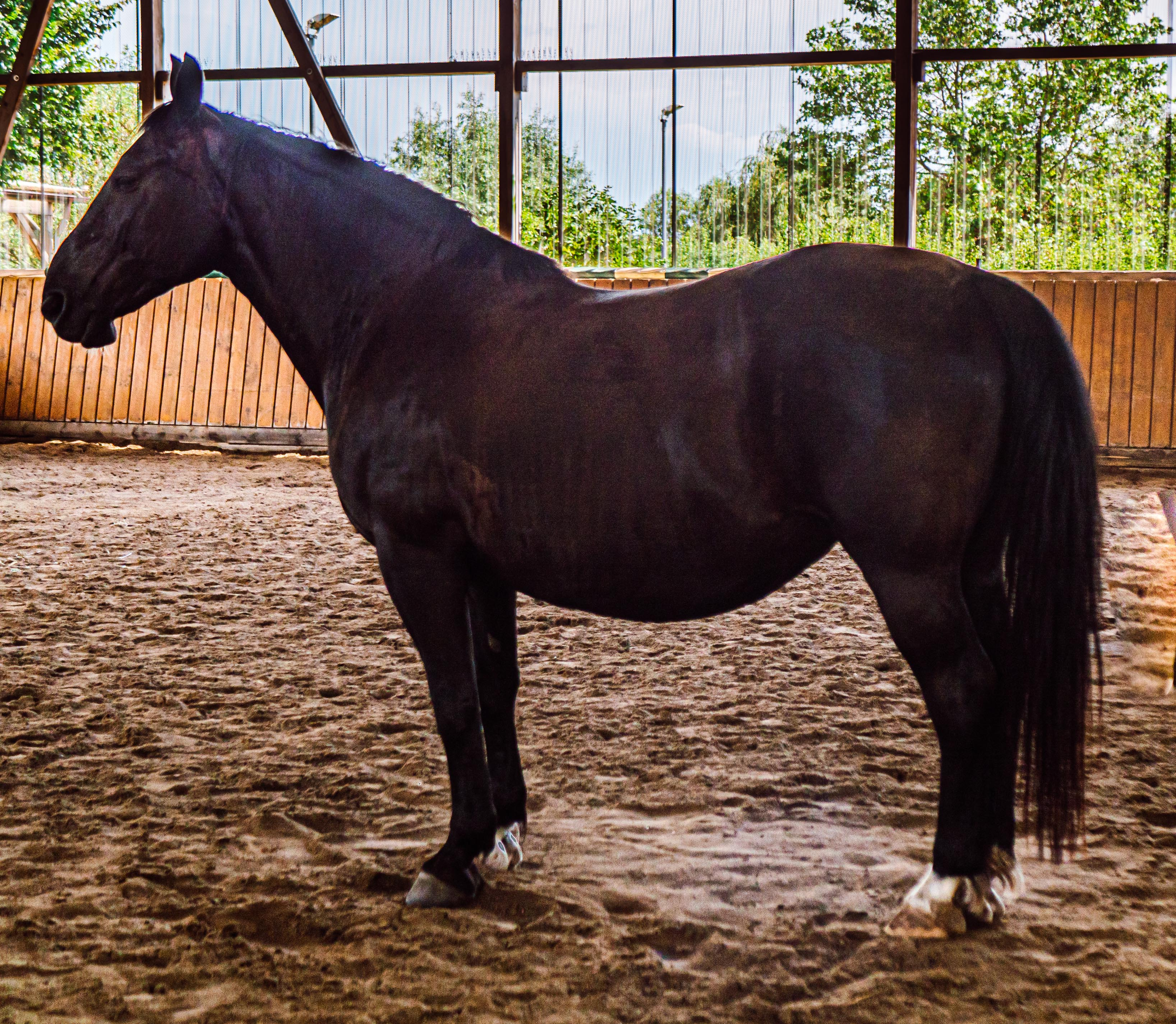
- Conservation status: FAO (2007): critical; DAD-IS (2021): critical; GEH (2021): category I: extrem gefährdet
- Other names: Rottaler Pferd; Rottaler Ross; Rottaler Warmblut
- Country of origin: Germany
- Distribution: Bavaria
- Use: carriage horse

Traits
- Weight: Female: 650 kg
- Height: Male: 165 cm; Female: 160 cm
- Colour: usually bay, also black or chestnut

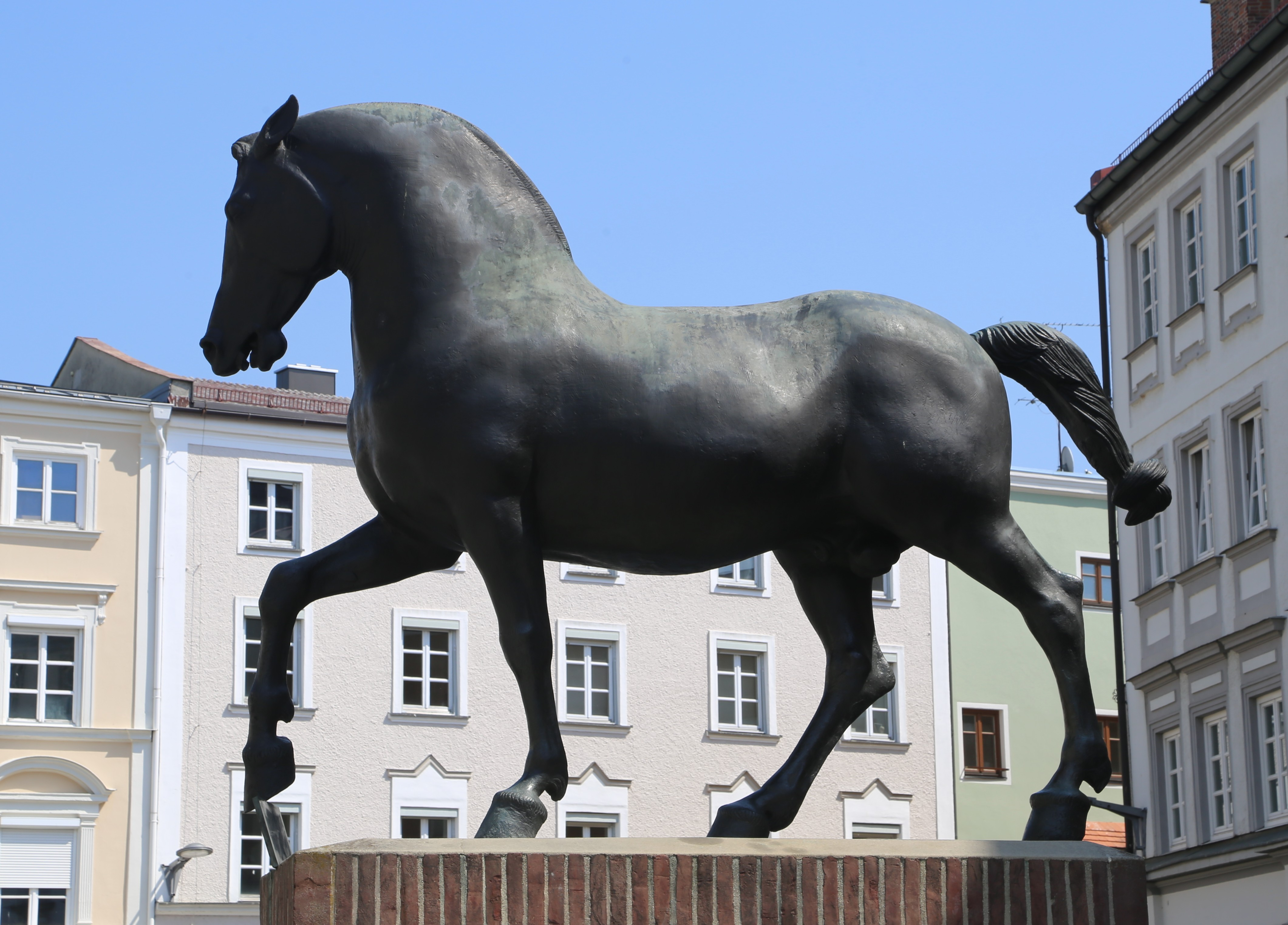
Bronze statue of the Rottaler Ross by Hans Wimmer, in the Stadtplatz of Pfarrkirchen

The Rottaler is a German breed of riding and carriage horse of heavy warmblood type. The name derives from that of the Rottal, the valley of the Rott in the Landkreis of Rottal-Inn in south-eastern Bavaria. It is critically endangered. The Bavarian Warmblood derives from it.

== History ==
The Rottaler originated in – and is named for – the Rottal, the valley of the Rott in the Landkreis of Rottal-Inn in south-eastern Bavaria, an area renowned for horse-breeding.

A breed society, the Rottaler Warmblutpferdezuchtverein, was formed in 1906. A breed standard was drawn up, calling for a strong and capable carriage horse with lively gaits, characterised by good temperament, fertility and longevity. After the end of the Second World War there seemed to be no demand for such an animal, and the breeding goal was fundamentally changed; selection was aimed exclusively at the creation of a warmblood sport horse – which would eventually become the Bavarian Warmblood. A programme of breed replacement was adopted: Rottaler mares (of which only about 250 remained) were put to Hanoverian or Westphalian stallions, while Rottaler stallions were excluded from registration. In 1963 the traditional "R" brand of the Rottaler was changed to a "B".

Only a small number of Rottaler mares survived this period. A census was taken in 1991, and eleven mares were found; two part-bred stallions from Rottaler dam lines were identified. From this nucleus, conservation breeding began. A new stud-book was started in 1994.

In the twenty years from 2000 to 2019, the number of recorded breeding mares varied between 14 and 29, and the number of stallions ranged from 2 to 11. The Rottaler is an endangered breed, and is listed in the highest-risk category (category I: extrem gefährdet, "extremely endangered") on the Rote Liste of the Gesellschaft zur Erhaltung alter und gefährdeter Haustierrassen. In 2000 it was the "endangered breed of the year" of that association.

In 1966 a large bronze sculpture of the Rottaler by Hans Wimmer was erected in the Stadtplatz or main square of Pfarrkirchen.
