= Free jumping =

Horse activity

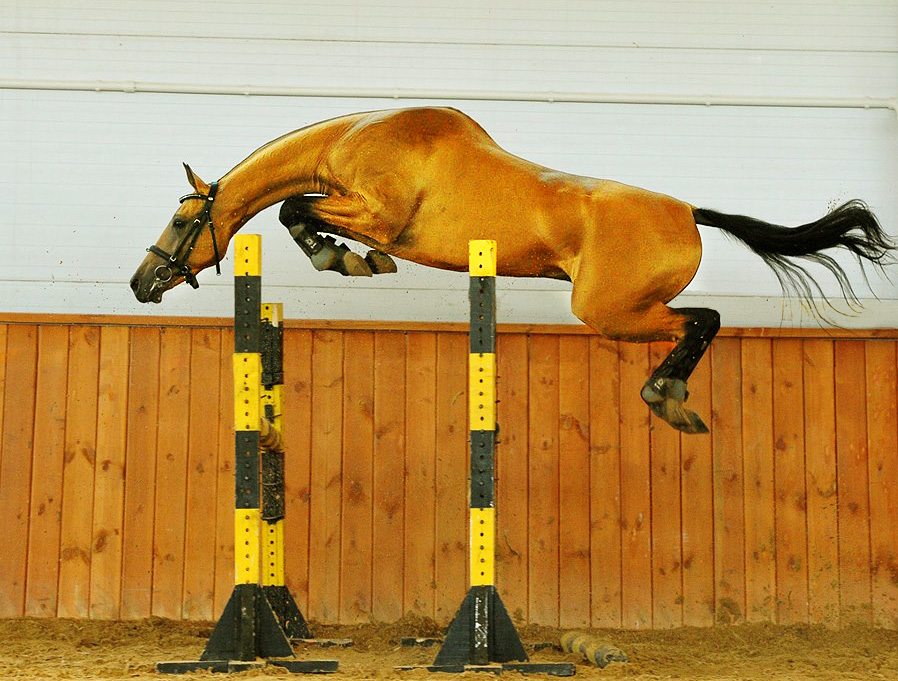
A horse free jumping.

Free jumping or loose jumping is the practice of jumping a horse without a rider. It is often conducted in a chute and is used most often to evaluate the jumping ability of horses too young to jump under saddle. The correlations between free jumping and eventual success in show jumping competition have been the subject of several studies. Free jumping is used as a diagnostic tool by most warmblood breeding societies to evaluate jumping prowess in breeding stock. This practice is used to build a horse's confidence over jumps without a rider's interference, to evaluate a horse's jumping ability, or to showcase a horse that is for sale. This training method is used in a variety of ways, both professionally and recreationally. Free jumping is also done competitively, primarily with younger horses that are not old enough for a rider or just beginning their jumping career.

== Setup ==
In free jumping, a chute is used to direct the horse over the jumps. The chute consists of all the jumps in the line as well as a small stretch for entry and exit so the horse approaches and leaves the jumps straight. The width of the chute is the width of the poles for the jumps. The “walls” of the chutes usually consist of jumping poles at a height above the highest jump with additional poles underneath if there is a chance the horse will try to go under the poles. This is to discourage any refusals and make the horse face the jumps head on without them seeing an easier way out. The series of jumps should increase in height down the line to allow the horse to get going before faced with a large jump. The striding between jumps can vary depending on what the trainer wants to achieve. When starting a horse in free jumping it is a good idea to start with fewer and lower jumps until a horse is comfortable and then increase the difficulty. A good practice is to lead the horse through the chute the first time and work towards either running the horse to the chute and letting it go, or sending the horse through the chute without having to touch it.

== Purpose ==
Free jumping is used for a variety of purposes, including starting a horse over jumps, reschooling a horse that has developed problems over jumps, evaluating a young horse's potential, or exhibiting a veteran jumper for sale. This method allows evaluation of a horse’s ability without any influence from the rider, good or bad. A trained eye can determine if the horse has natural jumping ability, a good mind, confidence, and athleticism.

== Starting ==
Free jumping is primarily used to start horses over jumps. The goal from this training method is to develop an honest jumper that has confidence over fences and to strengthen muscles used for jumping. Starting without a rider is viewed as beneficial because a rider can interfere with the horse’s natural way of going and create unnecessary problems. A poor rider will create nervousness or bad habits in the horse that will be difficult to reverse. Allowing a horse to jump on its own also develops better balance and strengthens the necessary muscles which will make it easier on their joints and back when it comes time to jump with the added weight of a rider. By starting a horse over jumps without a rider it makes the horse better prepared and easier to ride over fences.

== Training ==
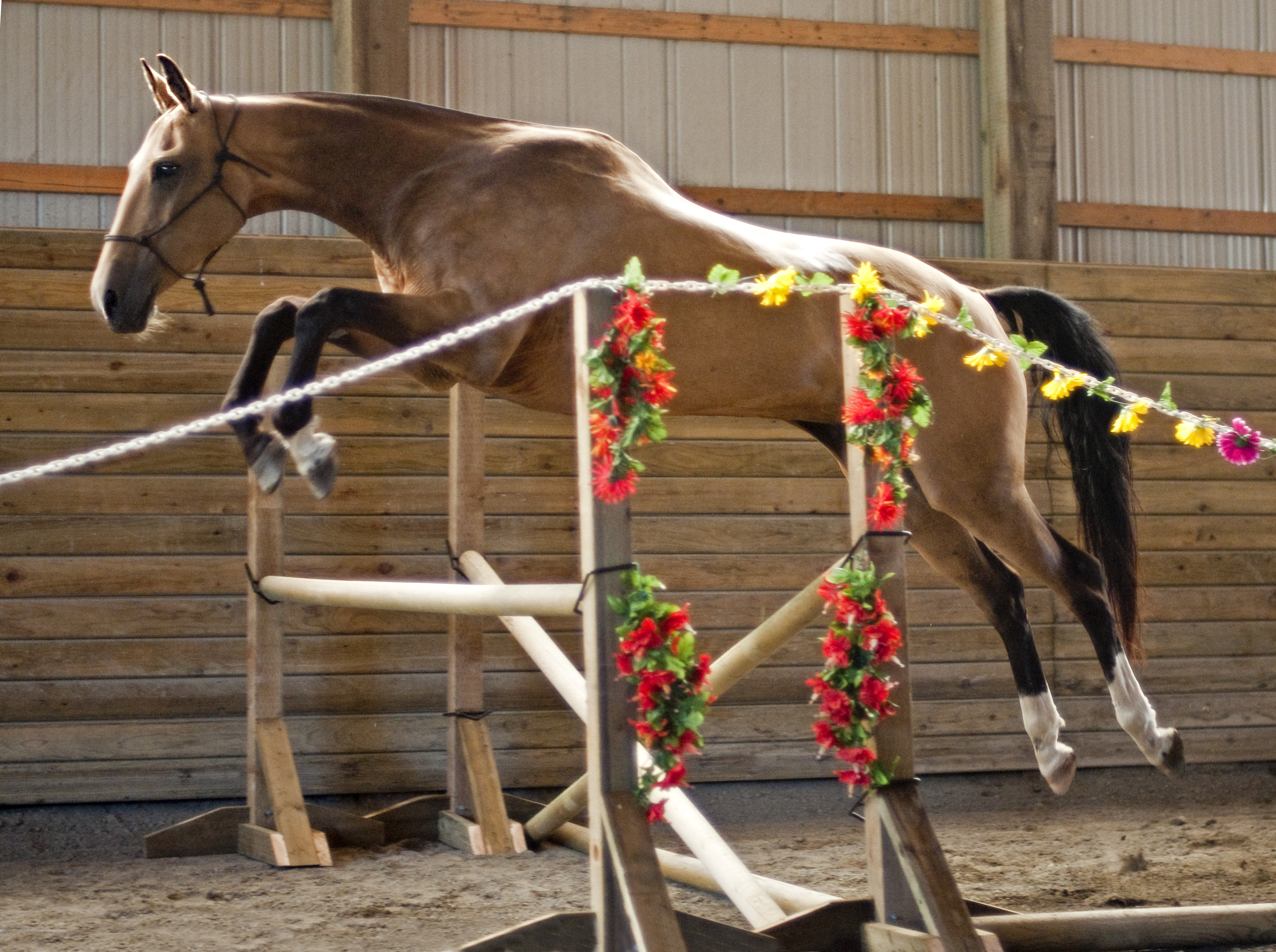
A horse free jumping.

Free jumping is also beneficial for horses that have been ridden over jumps. It is helpful to horses that have developed nervousness over jumps, tendencies to bolt over jumps, and problems with refusals. By starting the horse off small and gradually increasing size, a trainer can develop confidence in the horse. By subtracting the rider, the horse learns to jump on its own without interference. Over time, the method encourages the horse to relax and take its time through jumps, showing a more natural jump on its own. Free jumping reinforces forward movement over jumps and starting lower builds confidence. This can also be used to encourage a more playful attitude in horses, taking away the demands of the rider and making the simple act of just jumping more fun. Free jumping is also a good practice for exercising the horse, even one that is not used for jumping. It can produce a good mind while strengthening muscles and stretching the back and neck. It also provides variation in a horse's routine, which can be a break from a rigorous jumping schedule.

== Evaluation and selling ==
Free jumping is often used to determine a young horse's jumping potential before it can be ridden over jumps or to see the natural jump without a rider. In both cases a good free jump will increase the value of a horse. Jumping horses is a popular event in competitive and recreational riding, and in many case an owner will put a horse up for sale with a video of free jumping. This shows the horse’s movement, temperament and jumping potential, whether or not the horse was used for jumping.

== Drawbacks ==
While free jumping has many benefits it can also cause many problems if not done properly. A horse can learn to refuse if not kept in the chute, may compensate incorrectly for bad distances, and a bad experience overall will make a horse nervous or ill-tempered to jump once under saddle. A horse can also be harmed if it is pushed too hard when it is too young or not mentally or physically ready. Free jumping is a form of training that requires an experienced rider or trainer present.

== Competitions ==
Free jumping competitions are done for younger horses to prove their jumping ability and increase the value of the individual horse, as well as the bloodlines and breeder's reputation. For professional breeders and trainers these are serious events to improve their business. Free jumping competitions are most often put on by various warmblood associations, to support the development of jumping and good training practices.
