= Westphalian horse =

Breed of horse

Westphalian
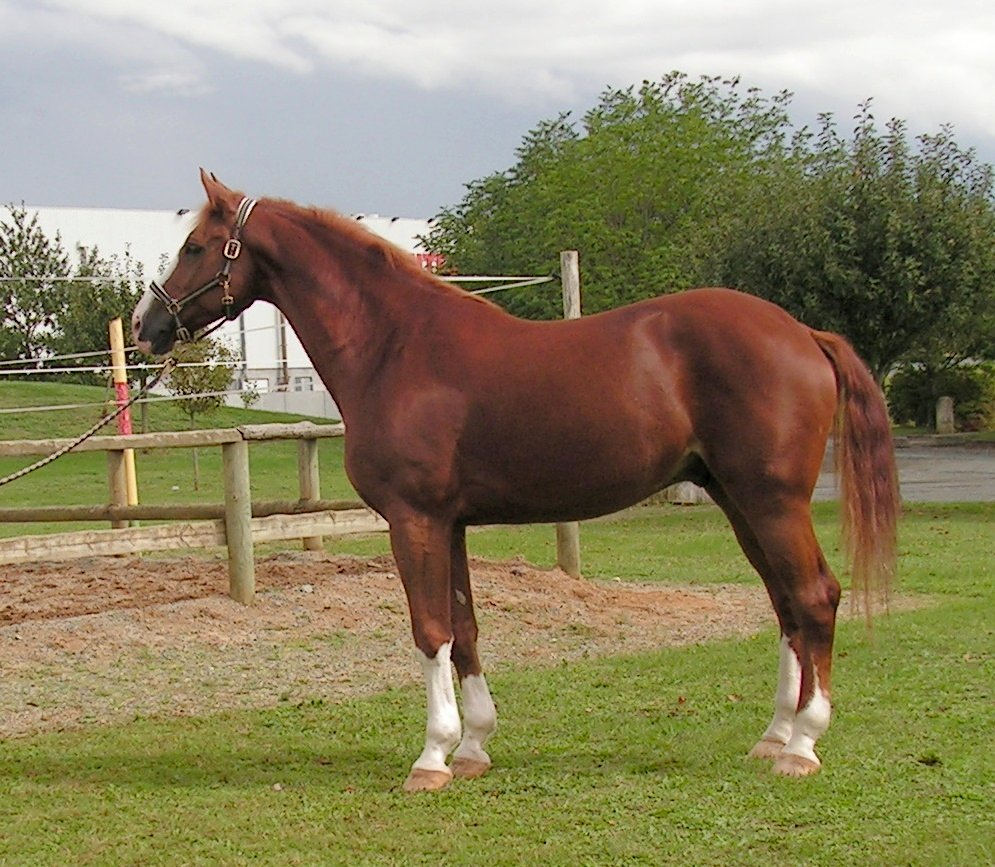

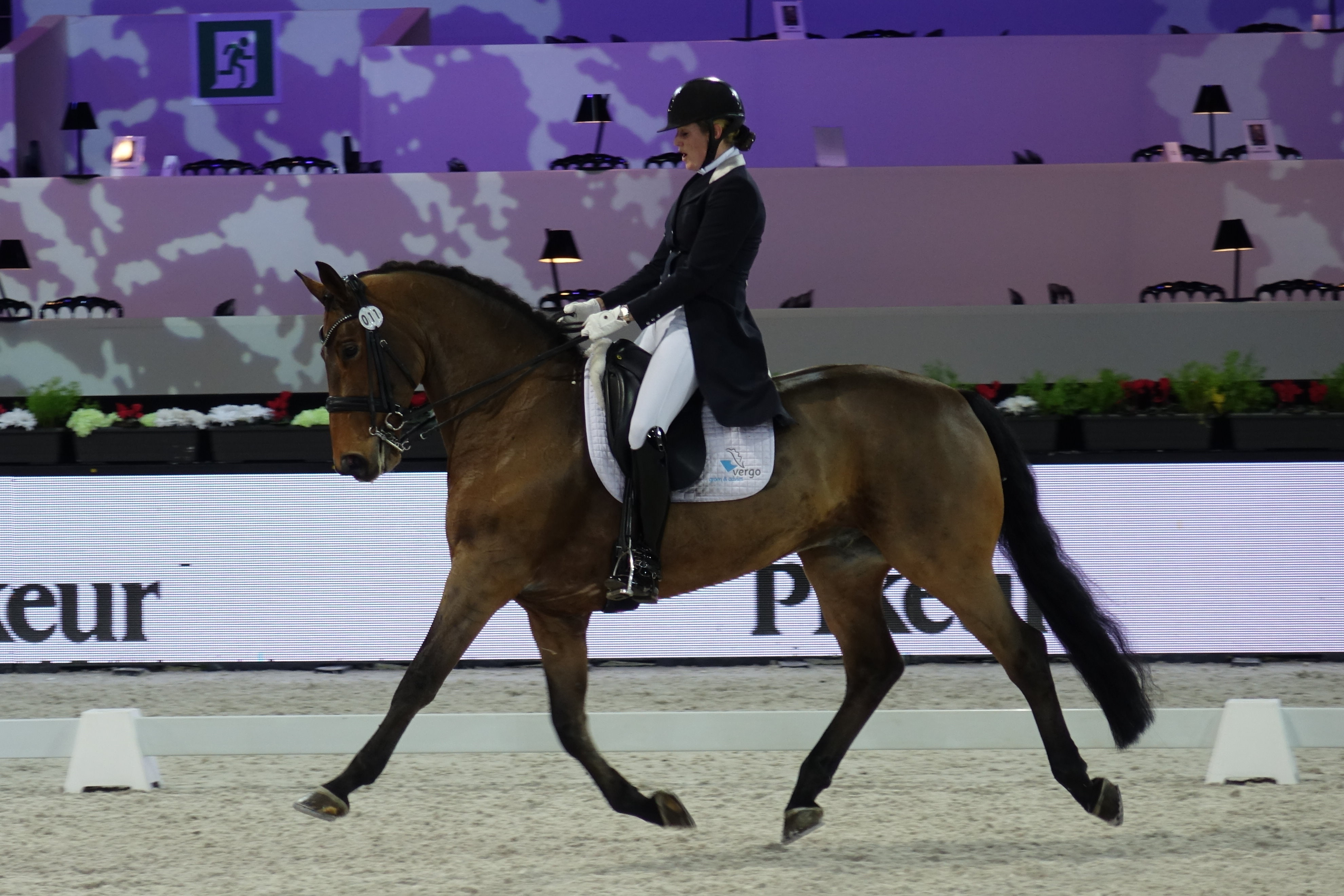
- Other names: Westfalen, Westfälisches Pferd
- Country of origin: Westphalia, Germany

Traits
- Distinguishing features: German warmblood bred for competitive and pleasure riding in dressage and show jumping.

Breed standards
- Westfälisches Pferdestammbuch e.V.

The Westphalian or Westfalen is a warmblood horse breed which originated in the Westphalia region of western Germany. The Westphalian is closely affiliated with the state-owned stud farm of Warendorf, which it shares with the Rhinelander. Since World War II, the Westphalian horse has been bred to the same standard as the other German warmbloods, and they are particularly famous as Olympic-level show jumpers and dressage horses. Next to the Hanoverian, the Westphalian studbook has the largest breeding population of any warmblood in Germany.

== History ==
=== Warendorf ===
The history of the Westphalian horse is linked with the State Stud of Warendorf, which was founded in 1826 to serve both the Prussian provinces of Westphalia and Rheinland. The stud was built under the Prussian Stud Administration, which was put together by King Frederick William I in 1713 to improve horse breeding efforts in the German-speaking region. Government-owned studs, identified as "State" or "Principal" studs depending on whether the facility keeps its own herd of mares, purchase stallions that fit the needs of the surrounding region. The stud fees of state-owned stallions are low, enabling local breeders to produce high-quality horses from heavy drafts to riding horses to ponies.

The first stallions to stand at Warendorf were from East Prussia, and so were similar to Trakehners of the time. These horses were riding horses with Thoroughbred blood, suitable for the courtiers to ride and use in cavalry. As the human population between the Rhine and Weser rivers grew, the demand shifted to a medium-heavy all-purpose farm horse to cope with the increase in agriculture. The noble East Prussian stallions were replaced with heavy warmbloods from Oldenburg and East Frisia.

The turn of the 20th century saw the heavy warmbloods outdone in the region by the more suitable Rhenish Cold Blood. These horses were better able to pull heavy plows and artillery, and so while they were principally bred around the Wickrath State Stud, warmblood sires at Warendorf were gradually replaced by cold bloods. The revolutions in automotive and agricultural technology that these heavy horses helped make possible made them obsolete in turn. In 1957 the Wickrath State Stud was dissolved as the heavy horses fell out of favor.The stock of warmblood horses was replenished with mares and stallions from nearby Hannover, on which the modern Westphalian is based.

The Federal Riding School was incorporated to the state stud in 1968. It is the site of the training and examination of nationally licensed professional riders and instructors, and is also home to the German Equestrian Olympic Committee. Warendorf also hosts stallion performance tests annually.

=== Westphalian studbook ===
The first studbook for horses in Westphalia was founded in 1888, and the following year the first evaluations of stallions and mares were carried out. These inspections became the defining characteristic of the Westphalian, as they had for other warmbloods. The breeders of the best fillies were awarded a prize or premium as an incentive to keep high-quality breeding stock in the region. Only the very best colts, the young male horses that most closely fit what the local breeders wanted in a horse, were allowed to become breeding stallions. The first performance tests were held in 1905. These performance tests meant that stallions had now to not only fit a conformational model to be used for breeding, but also had to prove their worth under saddle and in front of the plow.

World War II destroyed all the old pedigree records that had been kept so carefully. The next mare evaluation wasn't held until 1946, when a new breeding aim was implemented – a riding horse. Within 30 years, this new aim was coming to fruition: the 100-day test was implemented in 1982, and a Westphalian, Ahlerich, took gold in dressage at the Los Angeles Olympics of 1984.

During past decade, other registries have split their breeding stock into jumper-type and dressage-type, while Westphalian verband resists specialization. Instead, Westphalians are bred to be good movers with high rideability and jumping ability for markets of mostly amateurs who appreciate versatile, pleasant horses.

== Breed Characteristics ==
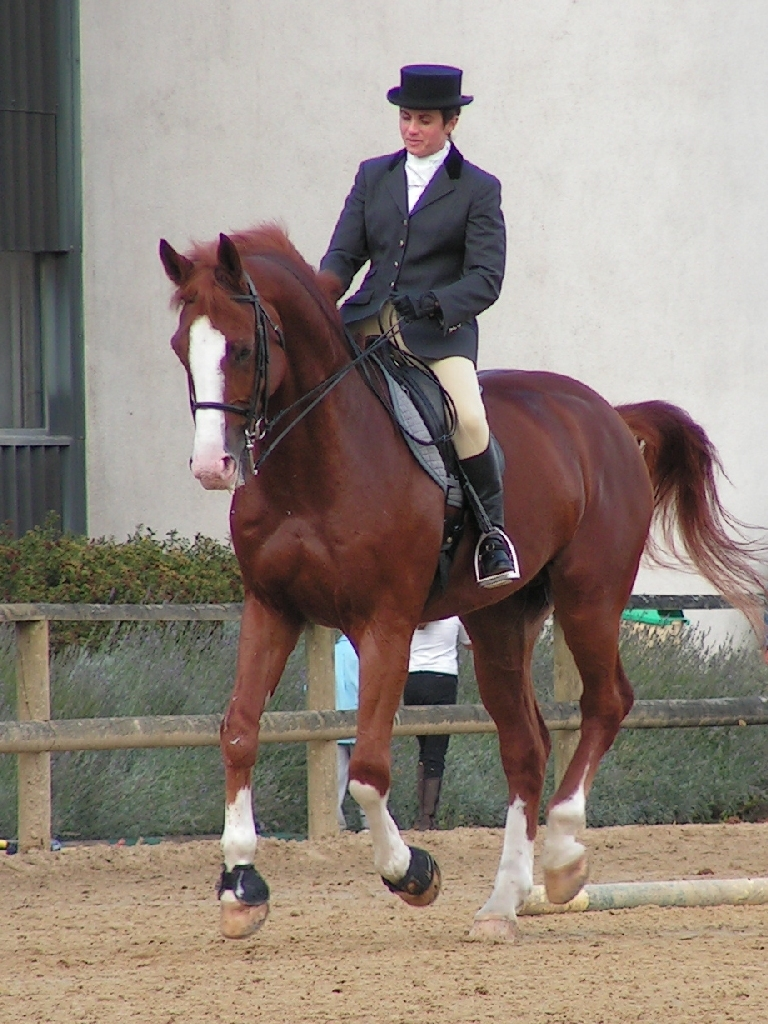
The Westphalian excels in dressage

Westphalians are bred to the same standard as the other German warmbloods and in particular exchange a great deal of genetic material with the nearby Rhinelander and Hanoverian. The standard for all German riding horses calls for an appealing, long-lined, correct riding horse with bold, expansive, elastic gaits, suitable for all types of riding due to its temperament, character, and rideability. The Westphalian's type is less refined than that of a Thoroughbred, but less coarse than that of a draft horse. Westphalians usually stand between 15.2 and 17.2 hands (62 and 70 inches, 157 and 178 cm) at the withers and weigh between 1000 and 1300 lbs.

The Westphalian registry, or verband, does not discriminate on color or markings, however, colors other than black, bay, chestnut, and grey are rare. The best way to identify a Westphalian is by the brand on the left hip: a crowned shield containing the letter "W" which Westphalians receive when they are awarded their papers at a foal show.

== Uses ==
Westphalians are bred to be suitable for pleasure riding and competitive in dressage and show jumping. As of September 2010, the studbook was ranked #6 worldwide in show jumping, #5 in dressage and #12 in eventing by the World Breeding Federation for Sport Horses.

Olympians bearing the Westphalian brand appeared during the 1980s. The first was Ahlerich (by Angelo xx) who took individual gold in dressage at the 1984 Los Angeles Olympics. At the 1988 Seoul Olympics, individual dressage gold was won by Rembrandt (by Romadour II), who with Ahlerich was on the gold-medal German dressage team, while Pikeur Pedro (by Pilot) was part of the gold-medal German jumping team that year. In 1992 Rembrandt took individual dressage gold again, while teammate Goldstern (by Weinberg) took bronze. The two horses were part of the gold-medal German dressage team in Barcelona. At the Atlanta Olympics in 1996, Goldstern and Durgo (by Degen) were both part of the gold-medal German dressage team. Most recently, Farbenfroh (by Freudentaenzer) was a member of the gold-medal German dressage team at the 2000 Sydney Olympics.

Westphalian breeding has produced a number of sires very influential to sport horse breeding, including Polydor and his half brother Pilot, and Rubinstein. These families are significant for jumping and dressage respectively.

Westphalians are also popular in North America in show hunter competition.

== Breeding ==
Young stallion prospects – koraspirants – are presented at a number of preselection events at Wickrath in Rhineland and Muenster-Handorf in Westphalia. The preselection is a general appraisal of the quality of the colt in terms of his movement and conformation. There are no scores, but those colts which appear to fit the standard and be of breeding quality are invited to the main stallion licensing – hauptkorung – at Warendorf. Of the over 500 koraspirants presented in 2007, only a fifth were invited to the main licensing.

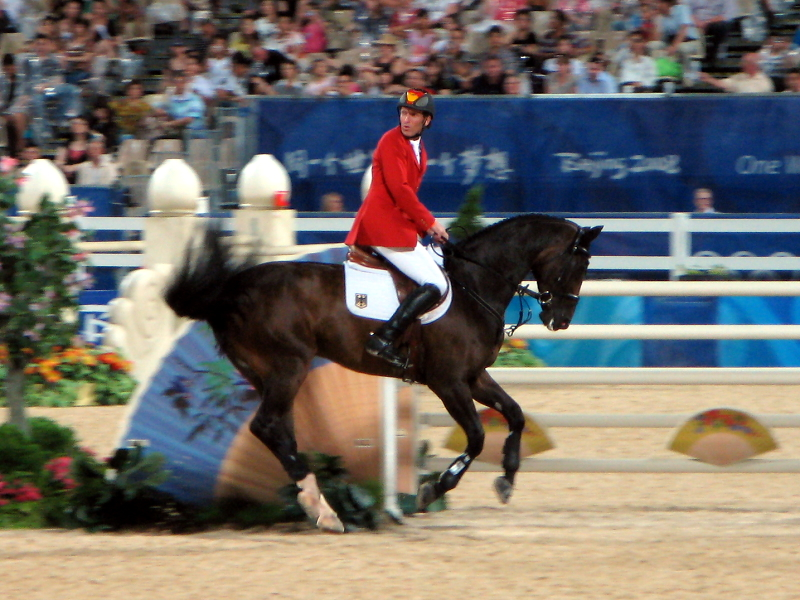
The Westfalen All Inclusive competing in show jumping with Ludger Beerbaum at the 2008 Olympic Games.

The licensing (korung) of both Rhinelander and Westphalian colts occurs at Warendorf State Stud in November. Each horse is scored on his conformation and on the straightness of his walk and trot. The breed judges look for a horse without deviations in the legs, correct angles in the hindlegs, and the overall appearance of a good riding horse. His height is measured to ensure that he meets a minimum standard, even though most warmbloods continue to grow beyond the age of 4. He is also evaluated on the expressiveness and elasticity of his walk, trot and canter, and his ability to jump while loose in a controlled, covered arena. The champion, vice-champion, and the best jumper are announced at the end of the licensing, as well as which stallions have earned the license. Many stallions change hands at the licensing during the auction that follows. About half of the colts that attended the korung were licensed in 2007.

The final step to becoming an approved Westphalian breeding stallion is the performance proof. A few exceptional horses may be able to prove themselves by open competition in sport, which can take years. Stallion performance tests were developed as a more efficient method of identifying the riding qualities of a young horse. Licensed stallions are sent to a testing station for a period of 30 or 70 days, where they receive training from affiliated professionals. Over the course of the training period, the trainers and riders become well-acquainted with the young stallion's virtues and shortcomings. The scores provide insight to their aptitude for dressage, aptitude for jumping, robustness, rideability, willingness, and temperament.

The 100-day test was held in Muenster-Handorf from 1982 to 2000, and has since been replaced by the 70-day version.

The strict selection procedure applied to breeding stock ensures that Westphalians are generally free of congenital diseases. They are usually sound and long-lived.

== Controversy ==
In the United States, Rhinelanders are sometimes represented as Westphalians to buyers. While the two studbooks have the same standard and same approval process, and share a state stud facility, they remain distinct studbooks. Sellers may be motivated by the lack of a North American counterpart to the Rhinelander verband, and potential confusion of "Rhinelander" with Zweibrücker, which are registered by the "Rheinland-Pfalz Saar International" organization.

== See also ==
- Horses in Germany
- Media related to Westfale (horse) at Wikimedia Commons
