= Mecklenburger =

Breed of horse

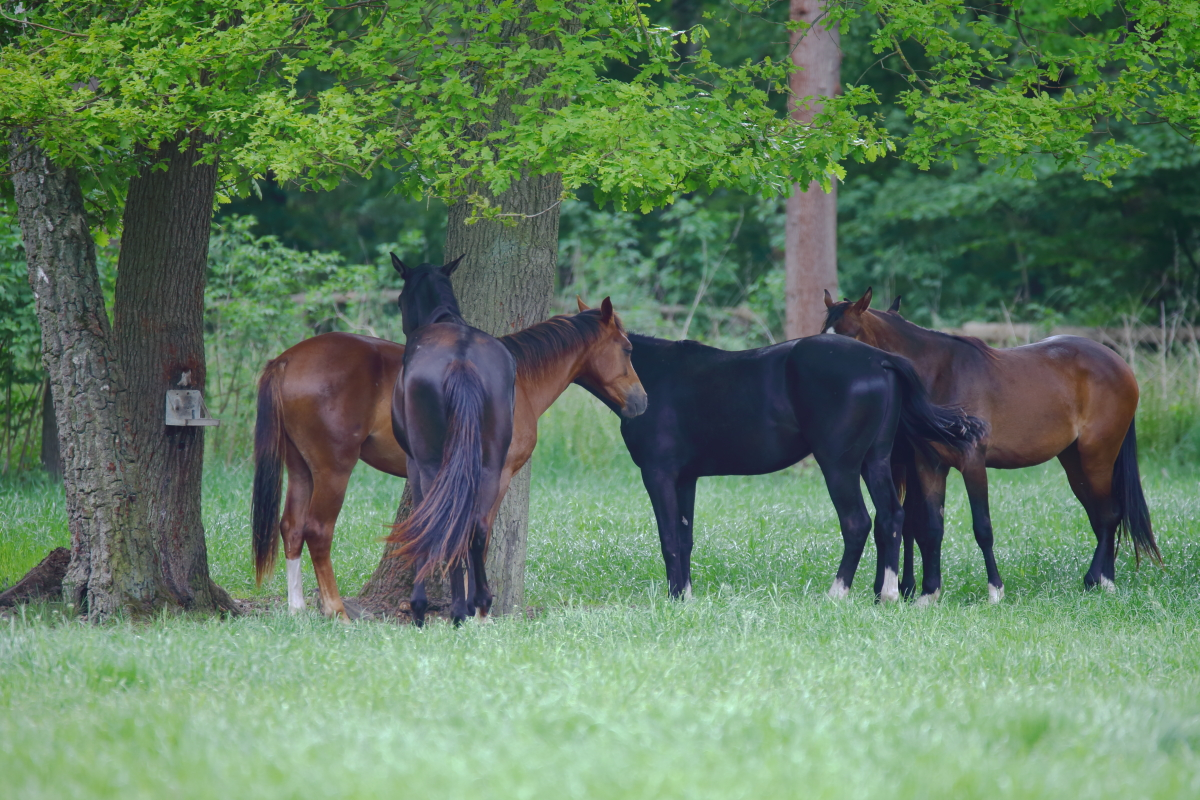

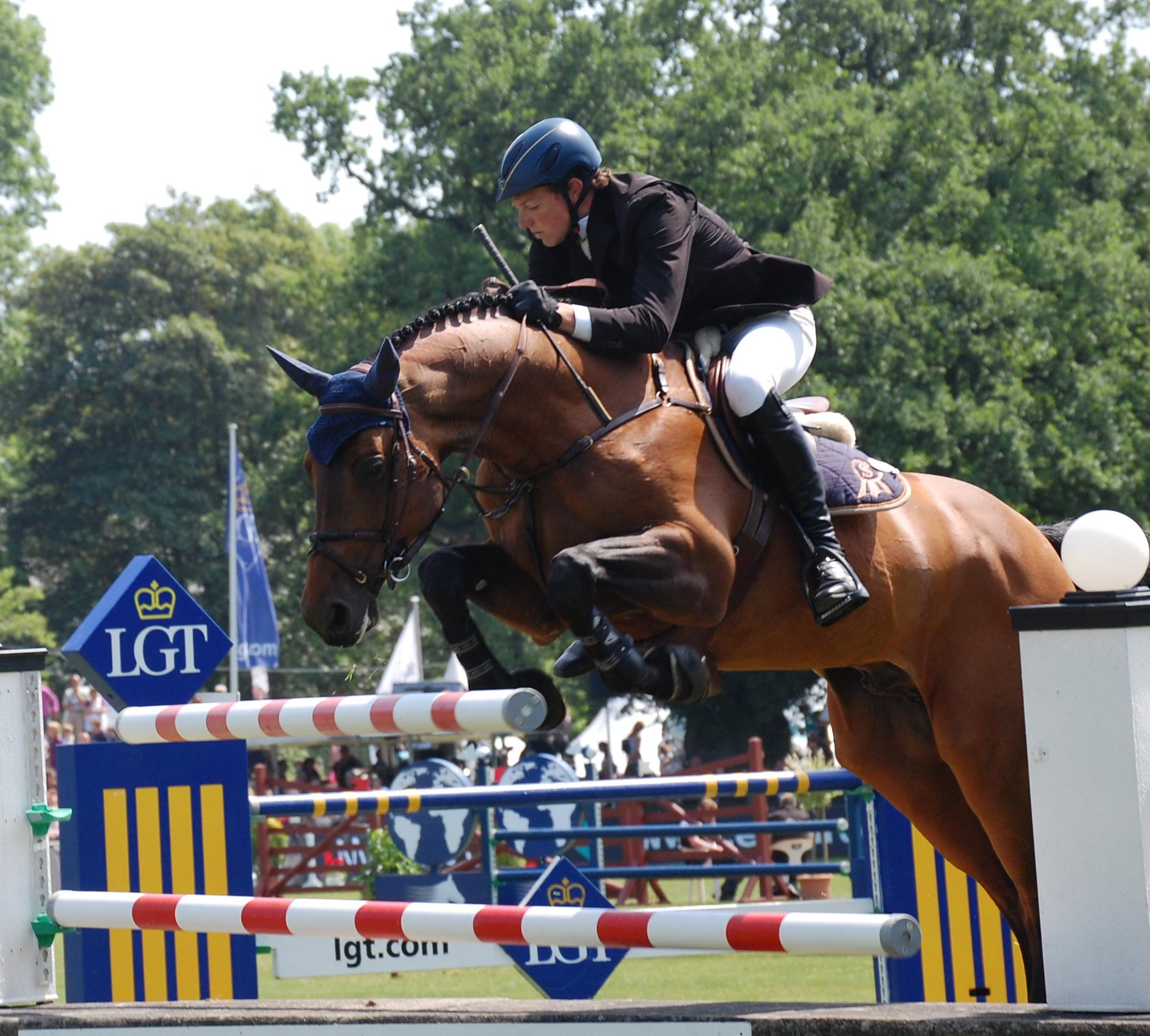
- Other names: Mecklenburg Warmblood; Mecklenburger Warmblut
- Country of origin: Germany

Breed standards
- Verband der Pferdezüchter Mecklenburg-Vorpommern

The Mecklenburger is a warmblood horse bred in the Mecklenburg-Vorpommern region of north-eastern Germany. The breeding of these horses has been closely linked to the Redefin State Stud.

Historically influenced by Arabian and Thoroughbred blood, today's Mecklenburger is an athletic riding and driving horse similar to the neighboring Hanoverian. They are bred to the same standards as the other German Warmbloods, and are especially suitable for dressage and show jumping, though they are used for combined driving, eventing and show hunter competition as well.

== Characteristics ==
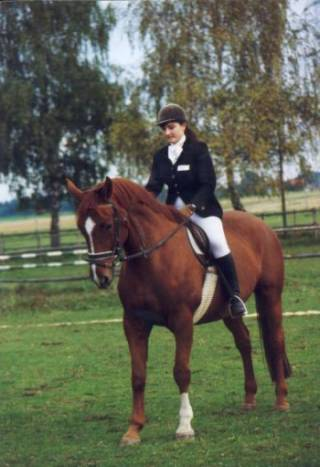
A Mecklenburger, 2005

The Mecklenburger has been bred as a riding and sport horse since 1970.

The modern Mecklenburg warmblood is best identified by the presence of the region's brand on the left hip, which is in the form of the letter "M" topped with a stylized crown. Coat color and pattern are not part of the standard, but most Mecklenburgers are modestly marked bays, chestnuts, blacks, or grays. Like other German Warmbloods, the ideal height for Mecklenburgers is between 15.3 and 17 hands (63 and 68 inches, 160 and 173 cm) at the withers. Breeding stock that deviate to the extreme may be excluded from the stud book.

Mecklenburgers, as warmbloods, are middle-weight, athletic animals rather heavier than Thoroughbreds. Since German reunification in 1990, breeders have pursued standards similar to those of the Hanoverian breeders. The modern Mecklenburger can be called a "noble" warmblood (edles warmblut), distinguished from the older Heavy warmbloods by the influence of Thoroughbred and Arabian blood and specialization for riding.

The breeding goal is a hardy, fertile horse with mental and physical stamina, a good character and lively, balanced temperament. Horses may be suited to any type of riding or driving sport due to expansive, regular paces, a flat-footed walk and vibrant trot and canter. The best heads are fine, dry, and expressive, with a tapering neck and strong topline, withers pronounced and well-laid back, the back strong but flexible, and the croup long, sloping and muscular. The chest and shoulder should have depth and length, respectively. The foundation should be dry on prominent, correct joints and well-shaped hooves.

With international jumpers like Antik (Azarro), Chacco-Blue (Chambertin), Luisa and Lady Like (Lord Kemm), Royal Beach Farao and Galan (Golden Miller), this small studbook is producing international competitors as well as leisure riding horses and driving horses.

== Breed history ==
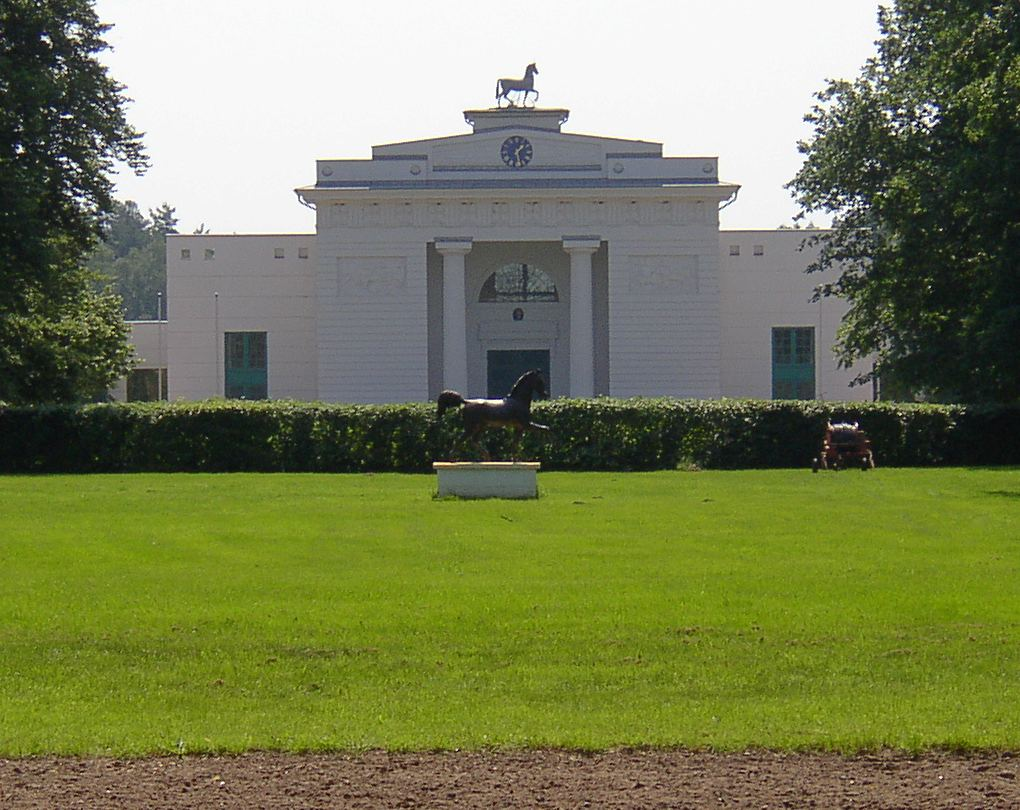
The facade at the Mecklenburg-Vorpommern State Stud of Redefin

The region today known as Mecklenburg-Vorpommern was, until 1934, composed of the duchies of Mecklenburg-Schwerin and Mecklenburg-Strelitz. However, the region was united by virtue of being under the rule of the House of Mecklenburg, so the histories of Schwerin, Strelitz and the other Mecklenburg duchies are intertwined. The history of warmblood horse breeding - that is, a horse that was neither draft horse nor Arabian nor Thoroughbred - in Mecklenburg is similar to that in the rest of Germany.

Mecklenburgers prior to World War II were all-purpose utility horses. Individual sires, families or breeders might specialize, but the most economically efficient horse was one that had many uses. Primarily, these uses were cavalry, transport, and agriculture.

The requirements for a cavalry horse were affected by three major changes: the decline of the Knight after the 16th century, the popularization of firearms in the late 19th century, and mechanization in the early 20th century. Between the Middle Ages and mechanization, the ideal cavalry horse was athletic, agile and highly obedient. Cavalry horses were typically bred for the nobility, but horses belonging to other residents were trained as "remounts." Following mechanization, the role of the cavalry horse in Europe was diminished to ceremonial use.

What was required of horses as part of transport was affected by similar advances: the advent of long-distance public stagecoach travel in the 16th century, the invention of the steam engine, and mechanization. Pulling stage coaches did not necessitate beauty, but endurance, efficiency and soundness. Large-scale train transport in Germany took hold late in the 19th century and significantly reduced the need for stage horses. More elegant carriage horses with high-stepping gaits became more popular for short-distance traveling, as did saddle horses. Once again, mechanization all but negated the horse's role in transport.

The agricultural niche filled by the horse was also affected by technological achievements. While plows became increasingly lighter and more efficient over time, the primary factor in determining the qualities of a region's plow horse was the soil. Throughout the ages, the demand for agricultural horses was also affected by the local populations, fluctuations in which altered the demand for food. Periods of high growth meant higher food demands, and more demand for plow horses. Yet again, mechanization following World War II ousted the horse from this role.

=== Early horse breeding in Mecklenburg ===
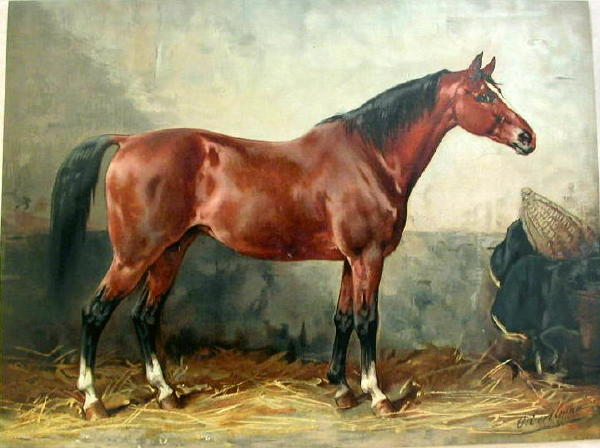
An 1898 lithograph of a Mecklenburger

During the 18th century when many of Germany's noble houses were establishing expansive stud farms to supply their courts with horses suitable for riding, driving, and cavalry purposes, horse-breeding in Mecklenburg was chiefly motivated by large, private stud farms. Residents had some access to stallions owned by their rulers, but a state breeding program did not yet exist.

Breeding efforts of renown were, however, taking place under the Counts of Plessen by the houses of Bassewitz and Hahn. Indeed, the versatile horses bred in the region were of distinctive eastern ("oriental") type and were well known as coach, saddle, and utility horses. In horse breeding, the term "oriental" suggests the influence of horses from the Middle East, including Arabian horses and Turkoman horses. Another characteristic of Mecklenburg breeding is the early involvement with the English Thoroughbred racehorse. The first-ever race track in Germany was created in 1822 at Bad Doberan, the summer retreat of the court of Schwerin.

The Royal Principal Stud, which kept a herd of mares in addition to standing stallions, was founded in 1810 and was followed in 1812 by the State Stud of Redefin. The breeding efforts of these two facilities were combined in 1819 by Joachim von Bülow, Senior State Equerry. In addition to the noble warmblood horses for which Mecklenburg was known, Joachim von Bülow populated the stud farms and their outposts with elegant Thoroughbred stallions. While the unusual affinity for part-Thoroughbred horses did not always suit the needs of farmers in the region, Redefin supplied the State Stud of Celle with stock year after year, including stallions like Jellachich and Norfolk that would become founders of the Hanoverian. Less than fifteen years after being founded, Redefin was composed of over 134 stallions at 26 outposts. In The Three Musketeers, written in the 1840s, d'Artagnan is given a "vigorous Mecklenburg horse" to ride.

By 1847, less than a fifth of the Redefin stallions were without at least one Thoroughbred grandparent, a trait that began to affect the soundness and longevity of their offspring. In an effort to correct this, draft horse stallions were put to use, but the result was merely a loss of the identifiable type. To regain the utilitarian warmblood type, which differed from the older coach horse type due to the advent of the steam locomotive, suitable horses were purchased from Hannover. As a result of the regular exchange of breeding stock, Mecklenburgers and Hanoverians remained similar to one another, and distinctly different from the heavier Oldenburgers and Holsteiners.

=== Mecklenburgers in the 20th century ===
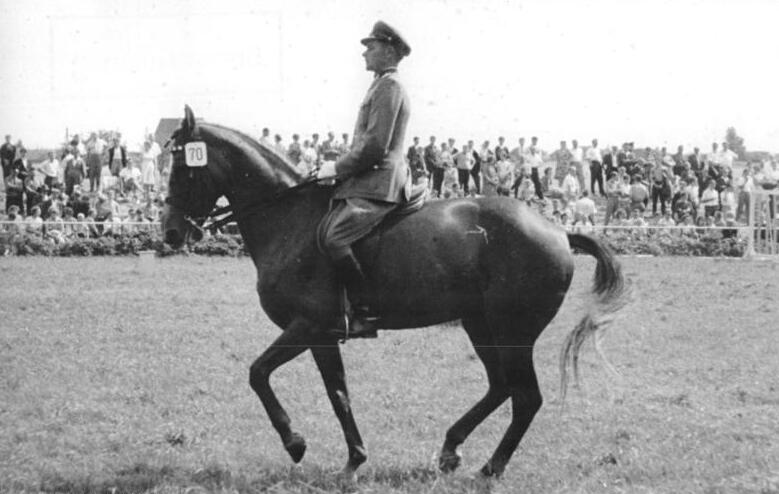
A Mecklenburger mare performing the piaffe at the 1963 German Dressage Championships

Mecklenburgers at the turn of the 20th century were bred much the same as their Hanoverian counterparts: stylish carriage and saddle horses, still suitable for plowing. As the locomotive replaced the stage coach for long-distance travel, less efficiency of movement was required of driving horses, resulting in higher action. During World War I, however, horses were used to pull artillery wagons and as remounts. In response, the horses were bred to be heavier and calmer. By 1920, Redefin's roster of 176 state-owned sires served over 10,000 mares at over 30 covering stations. But as the demand for horses faded, so too did their numbers: in 1930, only half that number remained. The stock of Redefin were influenced by a merger with Neustrelitz State Stud, reflecting the unification of Mecklenburg-Schwerin and Mecklenburg-Strelitz.

World War II produced a second upsurge in breeding of heavy horses suitable for pulling artillery wagons, so that in 1945, there were 151 Mecklenburg stallions at 44 covering stations. After the end of the war, during Russian occupation of the region, most of the Mecklenburger stallions were sent east.

Redefin continued to function as the region's state stud farm, with a herd of mares and over 100 warmblood stallions. The market began to turn towards the production of riding horses in the 1960s. This target was standardized in 1971 and by 1987, 100 state-owned stallions served the region. The mare herd was sold, and Redefin lost the title of "Principal" state stud in 1993, following German reunification. Today Redefin is composed of 8 covering stations and stands 64 stallions, not all of which are warmbloods. Behind the grand entryway of Redefin now stands an international-caliber riding facility.
