= Württemberger =

Breed of horse

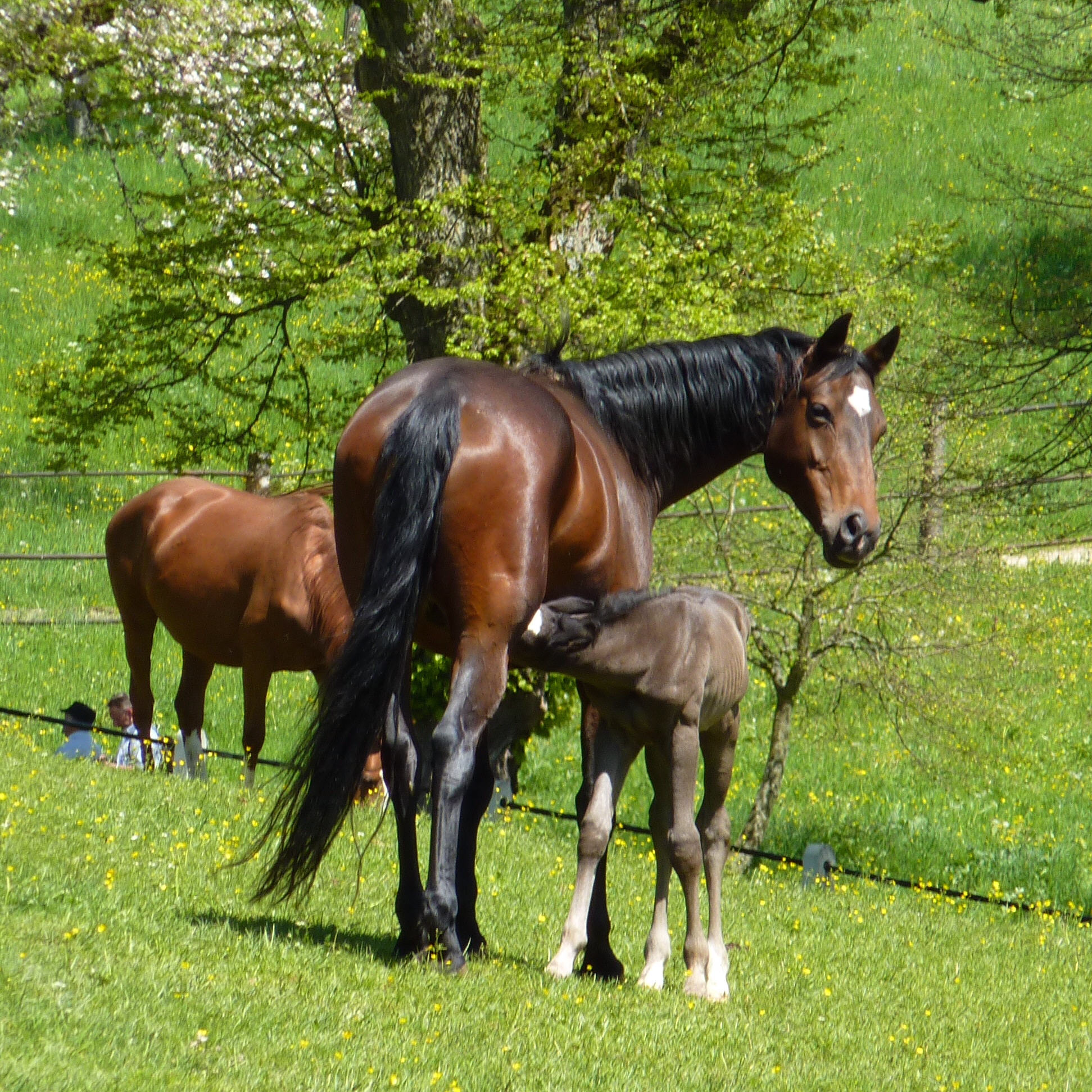
- Württembergers
- Other names: Baden-Württemberger; Württemberg
- Country of origin: Germany

Breed standards
- Horse Breeding Association of Baden-Württemberg

The Württemberger, Baden-Württemberger or Württemberg is a Warmblood horse breed originating in Germany. They are primarily riding horses, and are selectively bred for dressage and show jumping.

== Breed History ==
The breed registry studbook was founded in 1895, and around 1896, the Marbach stud began concentrating on the original Württemberger type, which was a multi-purpose horse used for both draft and under-saddle work. The original horses were produced by introducing Arabian, Trakehner, Anglo-Norman, Friesian, Spanish, Barb, and Suffolk Punch blood to local warmblood lines. An Anglo-Norman stallion named Faust was a significant early influence on the breed, and contributed to the original shape of the breed. This type lasted until the mid-1950s, when Marbach recognized, and began breeding a lighter, more athletic horse for modern competition.

The Trakehner stallion Julmond (1943–1965) was the foundation stud of new type, and helped to shape the modern Baden Württemberger. Additions of Hanoverian, Holsteiner, Oldenburg, Thoroughbred and additional Trakehner blood helped to further refine the breed into its current form.

== Breed characteristics ==
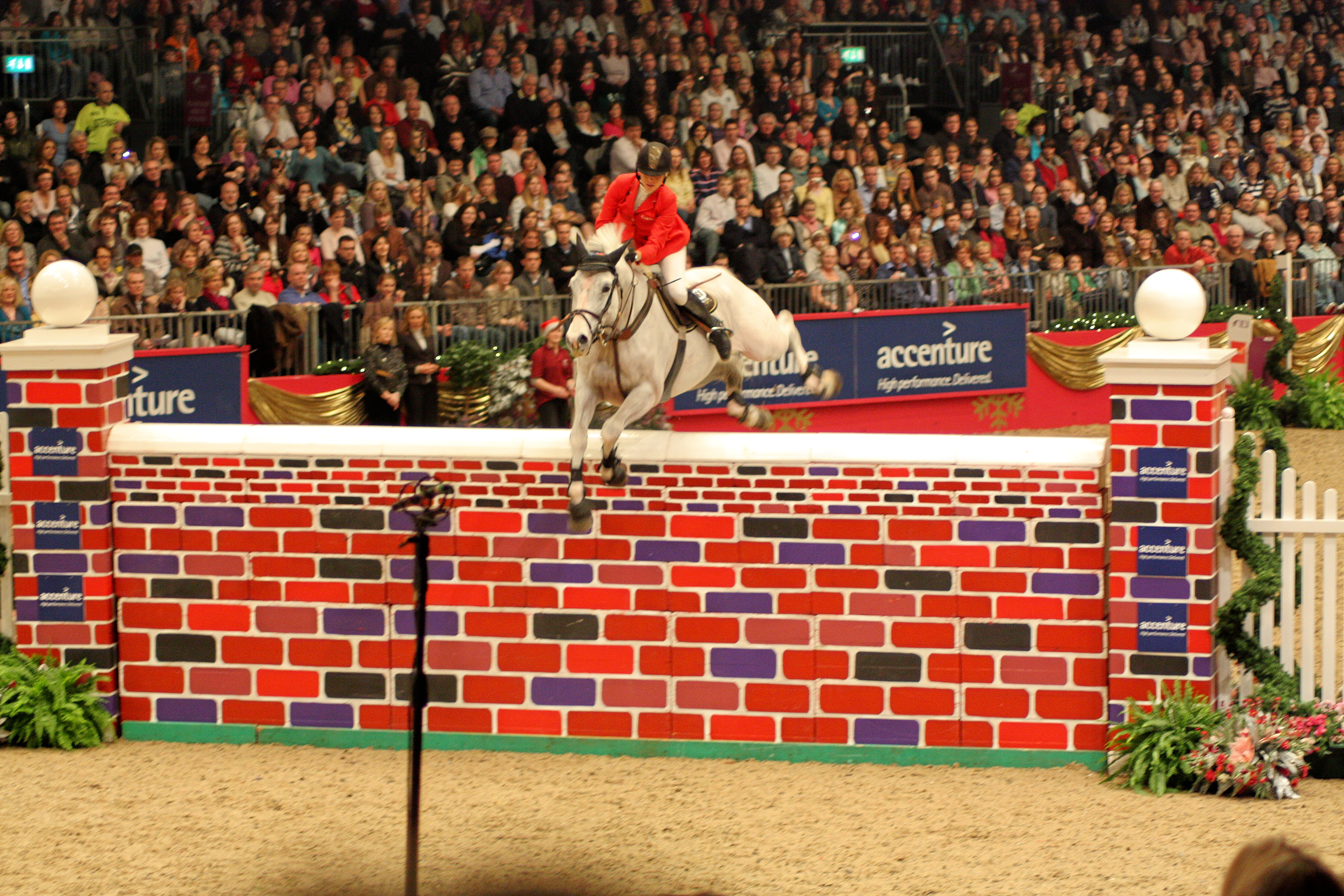
A grey Württemberger mare, Ladina B, competing in show jumping

The best Württemberger horses have excellent temperaments, combining a sensible attitude with lively and free action. These traits may have originally been installed by the use of draft horse and Arabian blood. They are tough and economical to feed when compared to Thoroughbreds.

The ideal Württemberger stands around 16.1 hands (65 inches, 165 cm) high, and is usually bay, chestnut, brown, or black in color. They have an average-sized head with a straight profile, a good neck, and prominent withers. Their chest is deep, the shoulders sloping and well-muscled, the back is long and straight and the croup sloping. They have muscular legs with hard, well-formed hooves.
