= British Warmblood =

British breed of horse

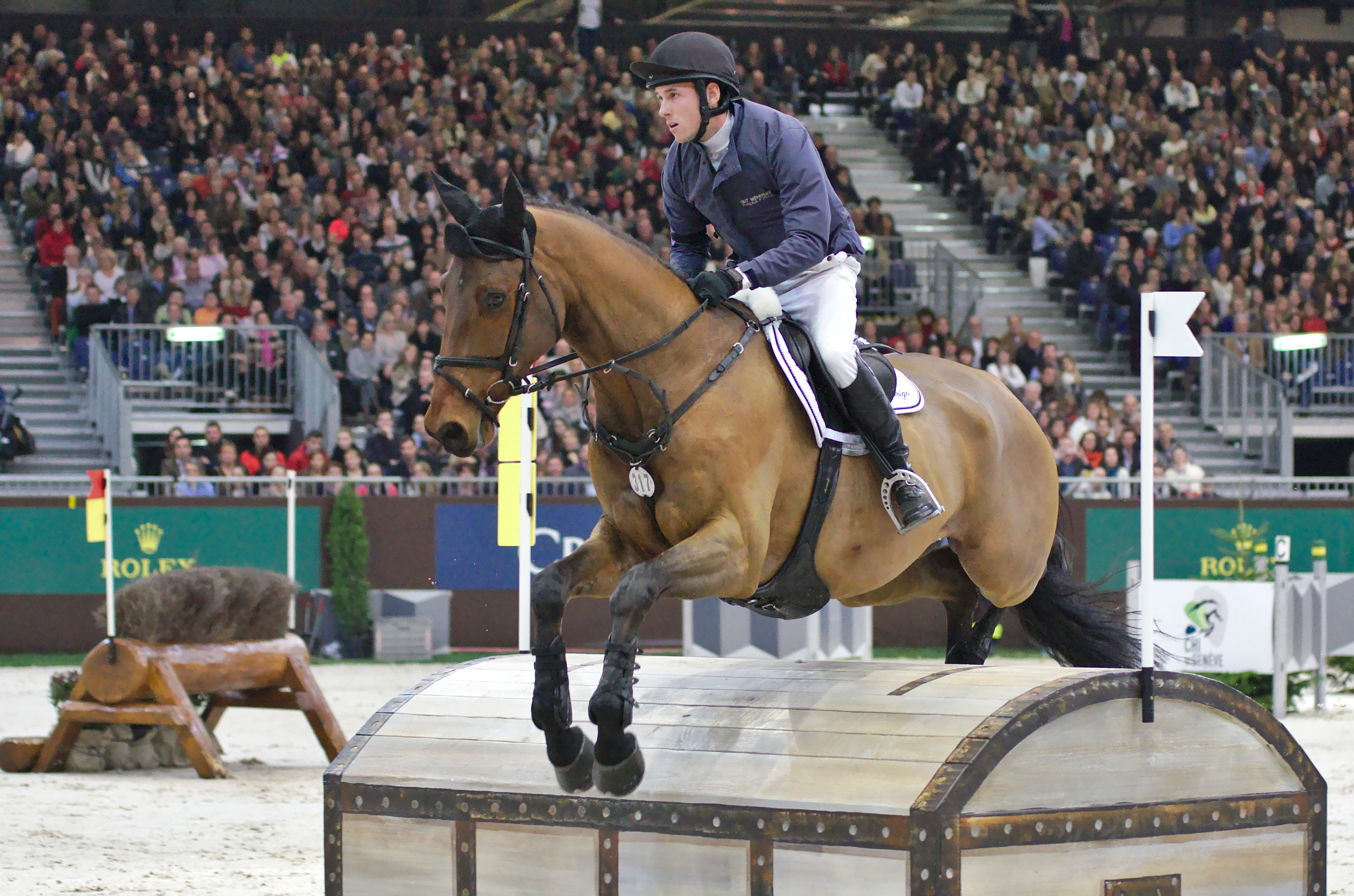
- Felix Vogg on Maverick Mcnamara at the Concours hippique international de Genève in 2014
- Country of origin: United Kingdom
- Use: dressage; show-jumping; working hunter trial

Traits
- Height: 1.55–1.78 m
- Colour: usually bay, chestnut or black

The British Warmblood is British inspection-based stud-book of sport horse. Like other warmblood stud-books it is commonly considered to be a breed. It derives from European sport horses including the Hanoverian, the Dutch Warmblood and the Danish Warmblood.

It is bred mainly for dressage, but also performs well in show jumping. Some have been exported to other countries.

== History ==
The British Warmblood Society was established in 1977 and opened a stud-book for sport horses; unlike most other European warmblood stud-books, registration was based not on progeny or performance testing but only on pedigree, conformation and veterinary inspection. Early registrations included imported European warmbloods including some Hanoverian, Dutch Warmblood and Danish Warmblood stock, as well as Thoroughbred crosses with various British horses. Separate sections of the stud-book were maintained for the Hanoverian and Trakehner. Approval criteria for mares date from 1982.

The society was registered as a private limited company in 1986, and in 1994 was approved by the Department for Environment, Food & Rural Affairs to issue horse passports. Since 2008 it has used the name Warmblood Breeders Studbook UK.

== Characteristics ==
Height at the withers is variously given as 1.55–1.70 m, as 1.58–1.78 m, and as 1.60–1.70 m. The legs are long, the neck medium-sized, the chest deep and the withers deep. The coat is solid-coloured, usually bay, chestnut or black. Horses may be branded with a crown surmounted by a cross.

== Uses ==
This horse was bred to compete in show jumping, dressage and the three-day event; it is particularly used for dressage.

In the stud-book rankings of the World Breeding Federation for Sport Horses in 2024, the British Warmblood was the 36th of 41 breeds listed in dressage, the 55th of 58 in show-jumping and the 36th of 58 in the three-day event.

On 5 October 2017, a British Warmblood horse won the British national hunter riding competition.
