= Warmblood =

Middle-weight horse types and breeds

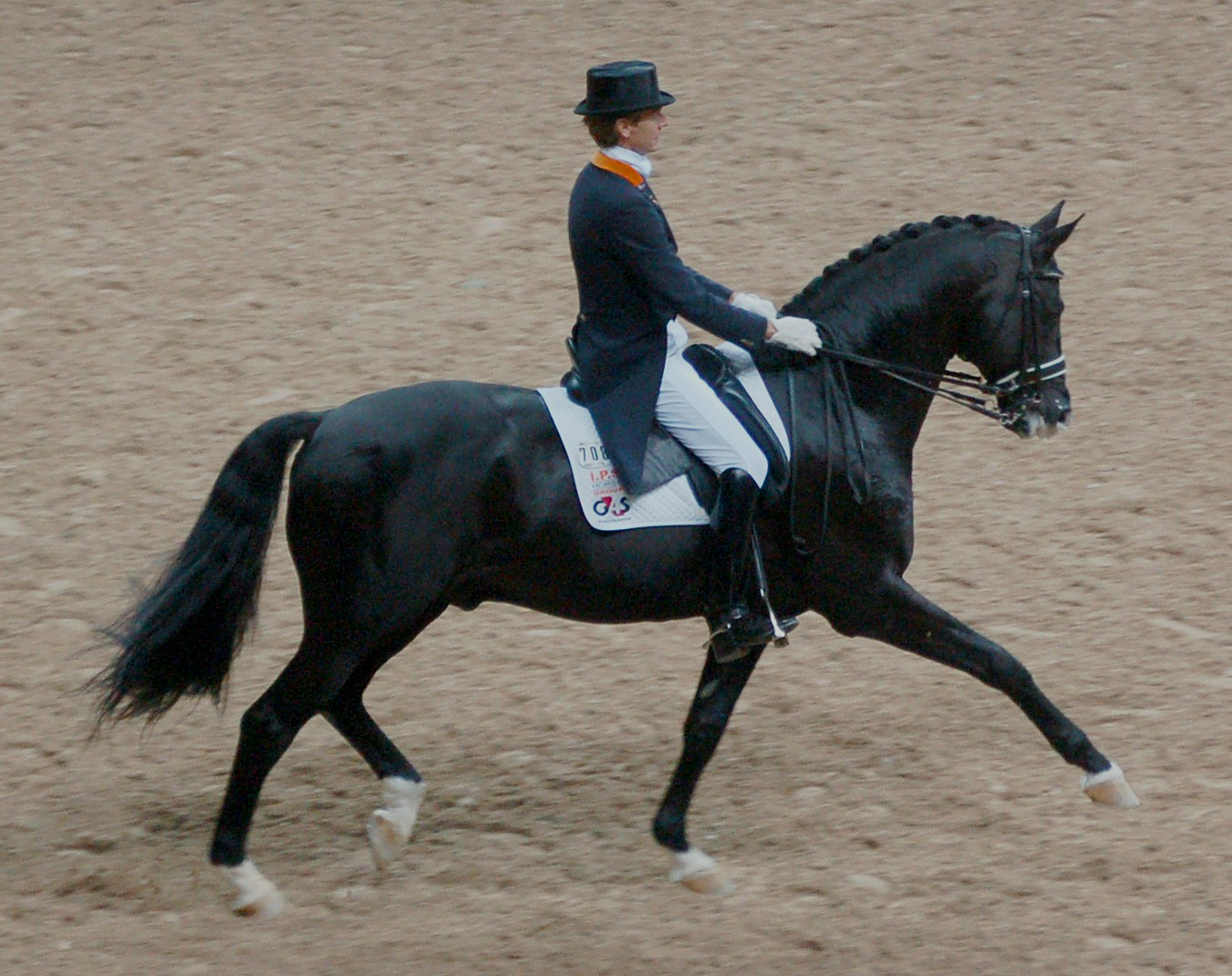
A Trakehner performing dressage

Warmbloods are a group of middle-weight horse types and breeds primarily originating in Europe and registered with organizations that are characterized by open studbook policy, studbook selection, and the aim of breeding for equestrian sport.

== Terminology ==
The term warmblood was coined to represent a mixing of cold blooded and hot blooded breeds.

- Cold blooded is a generic term meaning a heavy boned even-tempered horse breed from Northern Europe such as a Shire, Clydesdale or other draft horse breed. "Cold" is from the climate of their origin, and does not mean a cold-blooded animal.
- Hot blooded is a generic term meaning a high-spirited horse, generally of Arabian or Thoroughbred bloodlines. "Hot" refers to its temperament and the hot regions of the Middle East and North Africa from which they originated.

Although the term warmblood is occasionally used to indicate a horse which is a first generation cross between one hot- and one cold-blooded horse, the contemporary meaning refers to horses that have been bred over multiple generations to produce horses that perform well in various equestrian sports—predominantly show jumping, dressage, eventing, and combined driving.

Sport horse is a newer term for this type of horse. Older established breed registries retain the word "warmblood", and newer registries tend to use the word "sport horse" (also spelled "sporthorse").

== Breeding policies ==
Open studbook policies are different from "true breed" studbooks—such as those for Thoroughbreds, Arabians, Percherons, and Morgans—which have closed stud books and require two purebred parents to register an offspring. Instead, most warmblood registries accept breeding stock from other similar populations to continuously improve their own, and do not consider their own horses to be a discrete "breed". The Trakehner is an exception, as although some other breeds are used within the breeding population, this horse is considered a true breed. The Hanoverian, Holsteiner, and Selle Français studbooks are also considered slightly less open than others. Most warmblood registries recognize breeding stock from any other registry that is a member of the World Breeding Federation for Sport Horses which is affiliated with the Olympics-recognized International Federation for Equestrian Sports.

A defining characteristic of a warmblood registry is studbook selection, though even some purebred breeds in Europe use this practice. Studbook selection is the use of external evaluation to critique conformation and movement of potential breeding stock to cull unsuitable breeding horses and direct the evolution towards a particular goal. Today, studbook selection usually entails a performance proof in addition to external evaluation, particularly for stallions.

Standards of conformation and movement are not designed to perpetuate a particular ancestral type, but rather to meet a particular need. This concept is illustrated by the history of the Oldenburg horse through the past 150 years: in the late 19th century, the standard called for a heavy but elegant, high-stepping carriage horse, in the early 20th century for a heavier, stronger, economical farm and artillery horse, and since 1950 for a modern sport horse.

The most critical characteristic of a warmblood registry is that its breeding goal (or "breeding aim") is to breed sport horses. Each registry has a slightly different focus, but most breed primarily for show jumping and dressage. Many include combined driving and eventing as well. The breeding aim is reflective of the needs of the market. In eras and regions which called for cavalry mounts, warmbloods were bred to fit that need; when and where horses for light to moderate agricultural work were needed, warmbloods have also filled those roles. The purposeful evolution of the standard breeding aim is another characteristic of the warmbloods.

Warmbloods have become popular since the end of World War II when mechanization made agricultural horses obsolete, and recreational riding became more widespread in the western world. The ancestral warmblood types are referred to as the heavy warmbloods and are preserved through special organizations. The heavy warmbloods have found their niche as family horses and in combined driving.

== Warmblood registries ==
Most warmbloods were developed in continental Europe, especially Germany. It was once thought that the warmblood type, which originated in continental Europe, descended from wild, native proto-warmblood ancestors, called the Forest Horse, though modern DNA studies of early horses have disproven this hypothesis.

The best-known German warmbloods are the Hanoverian, Holsteiner, Oldenburg and the purebred Trakehner. Others include the Württemberger, Rhinelander, Westphalian, Zweibrücker, Brandenburger, Mecklenburger, and Bavarian Warmblood. Several of these breeds are also represented by ancestral types such as the Ostfriesen and Alt-Oldenburger, Alt-Württemberger, and Rottaler.

Central European warmbloods include the French Selle Français, Belgian Warmblood, Dutch Warmblood, Swiss Warmblood, Austrian Warmblood, Danish Warmblood, and Czech Warmblood. Scandinavian countries also produce high-quality warmbloods such as the Norwegian Warmblood, Finnish Warmblood, and Swedish Warmblood.

Warmblood registries which are not based in continental Europe include those that regulate the breeding of American Warmbloods, Brazilian Sport Horses and Irish Sport Horses.

== List of warmblood breeds and types ==
Not all breeds within the warmblood category are named "warmblood" as such in their studbooks—many have names based upon the geographical region where they were first developed. In some cases, where there is debate over whether a particular warmblood bloodline is a breed or a type, but the existence of either a studbook selection process in an open registry and/or a breed registry that is restricted or closed is utilized here.

- American Warmblood
- Austrian Warmblood
- Bavarian Warmblood
- Belgian Sport Horse
- Belgian Warmblood
- Brandenburger
- Brazilian Sport Horse
- British Warmblood
- Canadian Sport Horse
- Czech Warmblood
- Danish Warmblood
- Dutch Warmblood
- Einsiedler
- French Chaser
- Friesian Sporthorse
- German warmblood
- Hanoverian horse
- Holsteiner
- Hungarian Sport Horse
- Irish Sport Horse
- Luxembourg Warmblood
- Mecklenburger
- New Zealand warmblood
- Oldenburger
- Ostfriesen and Alt-Oldenburger
- Polish sport horse
- Rhinelander horse
- Romanian Sport Horse
- Selle Français
- Silesian horse
- Swedish Warmblood
- Swiss Warmblood
- Trakehner
- Westphalian horse
- Württemberger
- Zangersheide
- Zweibrücker

== See also ==
- Heavy warmblood
- List of horse breeds
- Sport horse
