= Austrian Warmblood =

Breed of horse

- Country of origin: Austria

Traits
- Distinguishing features: Warmblood type suitable for competitive dressage or show jumping, as well as recreational riding.

Breed standards
- Arbeitsgemeinschaft für Warmblutzucht in Österreich

An Austrian Warmblood is a warmblood type of horse registered with the Arbeitsgemeinschaft für Warmblutzucht in Österreich (Association of Warmblood Breeding in Austria (AWÖ)). Although the studbook is made up of jumping and dressage horses from many other countries, the mare base consists of native horses with a long history. The AWÖ keeps an open studbook, in which mares and stallions must pass rigorous inspections before becoming breeding stock.

== Characteristics ==
According to the written standard, the Austrian Warmblood is built on a mare base of old Austrian cavalry horses such as the Nonius, Furioso-North Star, Shagya and Gidran. Foreign warmblood sport horse bloodlines have been and will continue to be used to produce a horse more suitable for modern-day dressage and show jumping. Refinement comes from Thoroughbred, Shagya Arabian and Trakehner blood. The combination of the plain Nonius type and the Arabian-influenced Shagya and Gidran suggest a broad range of distinctive types, particularly about the head. Stock breeds such as Quarter Horses, Lipizzaners, Kladrubers, ponies, trotters, gaited horses and other specialty breeds are not permitted in the pedigrees of Austrian Warmbloods.

The Austrian Warmblood is bred for dressage and show jumping, but also for recreational riding by amateurs, following strict selection procedures that keep horses that do not fit the standard from breeding. The standard reads:

"Desirable is a noble, long-lined, correct and powerful Warmblood horse with good movement and jumping ability, suited to any type of recreational riding. The breeding aim shall be achieved through a comprehensive system of performance tests for mares and stallions, leading to improved selection for dressage or jumping qualities. Of great importance for the Austrian Warmblood breeders are rideability, good character, willingness, and balanced temperament."

While all breeding stock must measure at least 158 cm (15.2 hands high) at the withers, the ideal height is from 164 to 168 cm (16.0 to 16.2hh). Shagya Arabians are an exception, as they are permitted so long as they reach 150 cm (14.3hh). The ideal cannon bone circumference is 20 to 22 cm (7.9" to 8.7").

While the AWÖ does not disallow any colors or markings, the Old Austrian Warmbloods tended to be of uniform color, allowing them to be matched better in harness configurations. For instance, the Nonius is almost uniformly dark and unmarked, the Gidran is entirely chestnut, the Shagya largely grey, and so on. Therefore, coat colors apart from the usual black, brown, bay, chestnut, and grey would likely need to be introduced from an outside source. While there is a Pinto studbook under the ZAP, none of the stallions presently standing for Austria are of unusual coat colors.

In the past, Austrian horses had little variation in registered names. Most horses had their family's name (Furioso, for example) and a combination of Roman and Arabic numbers. Today, an Austrian Warmblood colt has a name beginning with the same letter as his sire's name (Belmondo by Belluno), and a filly has a name beginning with the same letter as her dam's name (Dragona out of Dravida).

The most reliable way to recognize an Austrian Warmblood is by the brand, which is given to foals on their left hip and is in the form of a stylized "A".

== History ==
=== Foundation ===
The Austro-Hungarian empire was known for its horse breeding programs which were based on a number of imperial stud farms. The role of these farms was to produce farm horses for the citizens, riding and carriage horses for the nobility, cavalry mounts and artillery horses for the military. Although the former empire is also famed for producing the Kladruber and Lipizzaner, prominent among these stud farms were those located at Mezőhegyes and Bábolna. The former was founded in 1785, the latter was purchased by the government in 1789, and both are located in modern-day Hungary. Mezőhegyes produced the Nonius, which was similar to the western Heavy Warmbloods, used for light agricultural work and for pulling artillery wagons. Beginning in the 1840s, Thoroughbred stallions - Furioso and North Star prominent among them - were bred to the Nonius mares to produce strains of more refined cavalry mounts and carriage horses. Bábolna was originally an extension of Mezőhegyes, but in 1816 the administration decided to use only Arabian and Arab-bred stallions to achieve their cavalry goals. Born in Syria in 1830, the part-Arabian horse Shagya became the most famous of these Arabian-bred stallions. He came to Bábolna in 1836 and founded a strain of light cavalry and carriage horses which were taller and heavier than purebred Arabians, but which retained distinct Arabian type. A chestnut Arabian named Gidran followed soon after, crossed on mares who were more Thoroughbred in type. Respectively, these two sires founded the Shagya Arabian and Gidran Anglo-Arabian breeds.

The Nonius, Furioso-North Star, Shagya, Gidran, and several other strains are often collectively referred to as the Altösterreichische Pferderassen ("Old-Austrian Horse Breeds"). These horses formed the native mare base on which the Austrian Warmblood was founded.

=== Registry ===
Mechanization set in on the heels of World War II, making the use of horses in agriculture and transportation largely obsolete. The notion of changing to the breeding of recreational riding horses germinated at the Federal Stud Farm of Piber. The Arbeitsgemeinschaft für Warmblutzucht in Österreich (AWÖ) or Association for Warmblood Breeding in Austria was founded in 1964. Today it operates under the Zentralen Arbeitsgemeinschaft Österreichischer Pferdezüchter (ZAP) or Central Association of Austrian Horse Breeders, and is composed of regional member associations.

The stallion licensing for Austrian Warmbloods occurs in Stadl-Paura during February. It follows closely the procedures used in Germany; exceptional young stallions are given the title Prämienhengst (Premium Stallion), a champion and reserve champion are awarded, and the announcement of results is followed by an auction. The performance test is also held in Stadl-Paura, commencing in June. Mare and foal shows are held by the regional member associations. Mares that exceed the standard in terms of pedigree, conformation, movement, and performance in Austria can also earn the Staatsprämienstute (States Premium Mare) title. The "premium" was formerly awarded to bribe breeders into keeping their top mares in the region.

Though the AWÖ is a young registry, their history of amending the criteria for breeding stock suggests a progressive attitude towards producing the best riding horse possible. The AWÖ is a member of the World Breeding Federation for Sport Horses (WBFSH).

The studbooks comprise about 2,500 mares and 80 stallions.

== Uses ==
The Austrian Warmblood is bred specifically as a recreational riding horse, and competitive dressage and show jumping horse. As yet, the AWÖ is unranked in the WBFSH standings for Jumping, Dressage, or Eventing, likely due to the small size of their breeding population. However, the 1995 grey mare Amanita and 1997 bay mare Westminster both compete on the international scene in show jumping (for Poland and Italy, respectively). Laredo, a 1994 chestnut gelding competes under a German rider in dressages' Big Tour.

The best place to see Austrian Warmbloods is in Austria. In addition to the auction of young stallion candidates and gelding prospects that follows the stallion licensing, there are a number of auctions for foals, riding horses, and elite horses throughout the year, usually in Stadl-Paura.

== Medical issues ==
Like other warmblood registries, the AWÖ does not give breeding licenses to stallions with congenital disorders including cryptorchidism, malocclusion, osteochondritis, or impaired breathing. As a result, Austrian Warmbloods are healthy and robust.

== See also ==
- Warmblood
