= Brazilian Sport Horse =

Brazilian breed of horse

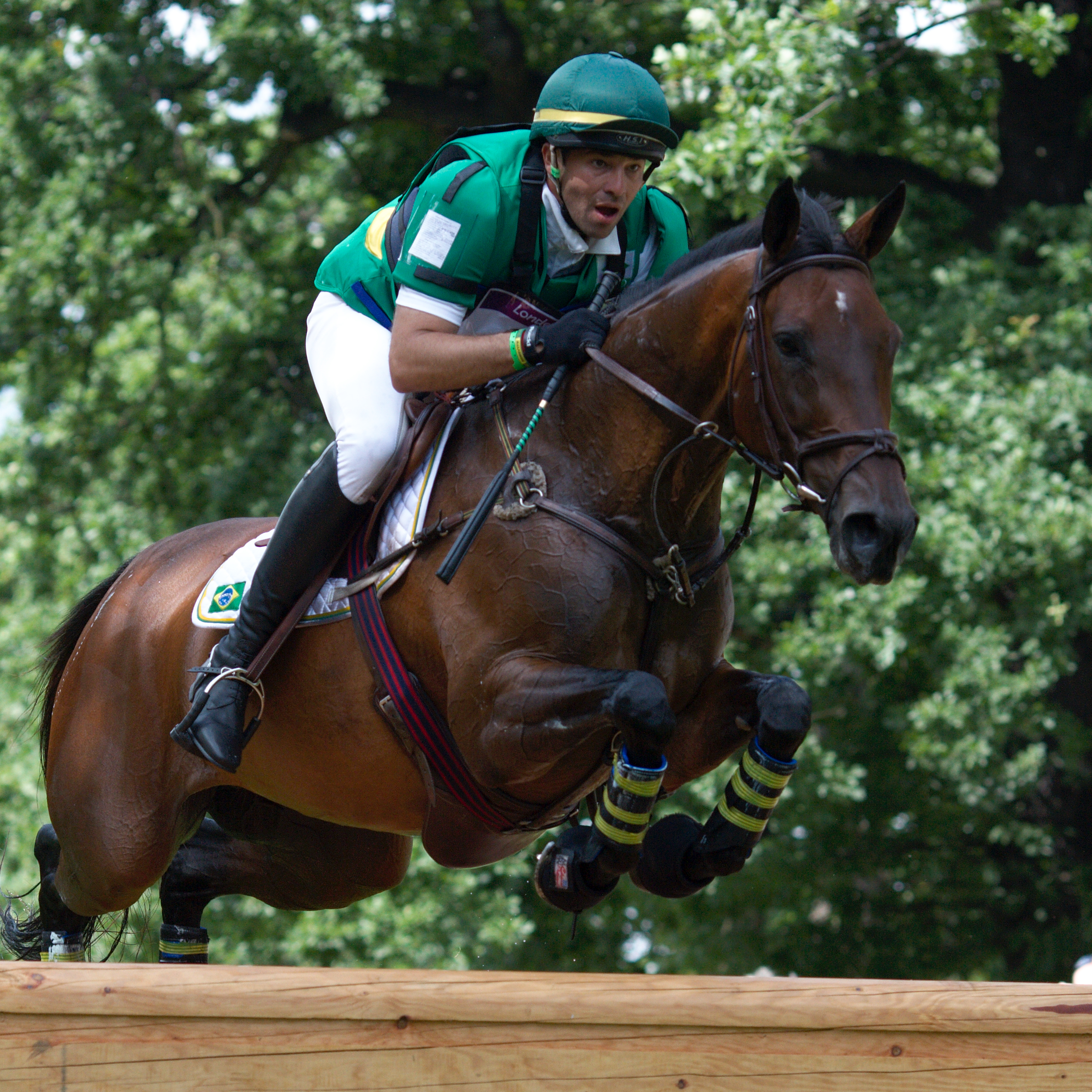
- Marcio Carvalho Jorge and Josephine at the Olympic Games in London in 2012
- Conservation status: FAO (2007): no data; DAD-IS (2023): not at risk
- Other names: Brasileiro de Hipismo
- Country of origin: Brazil
- Use: show jumping; dressage; three-day eventing

Traits
- Weight: Male: 600 kg; Female: 550 kg
- Height: Male: 168 cm; Female: 165 cm
- Colour: usually bay, dark bay or chestnut

The Brazilian Sport Horse or Brasileiro de Hipismo is a modern Brazilian breed of warmblood horse. It was bred as a sport riding horse for competitive equestrian sports, particularly show jumping, dressage and three-day eventing.

== History ==
Breeding of the Brazilian Sport Horse began in the 1970s. Local Crioulo mares were put to stallions from a wide variety of sporting breeds, among them Andalusian, Anglo-Argentine, Belgian Warmblood, Hanoverian, Holsteiner, Irish Hunter, Oldenburger, Selle Français, Thoroughbred, Trakehner and Westphalian stock. A breed society, the Associação Brasileira de Criadores do Cavalo de Hipismo, was established in 1977 and was recognised by the Ministério da Agricultura, the Brazilian ministry of agriculture, in the same year. In the 22 years from 1977 to 1998, the principal stallions used (whether by natural service or by artificial insemination) were, in descending order: 20.9% Thoroughbred, 16.1% Hanoverian, 10.5% Westphalian, 9.6% Holsteiner, 8.7% Brazilian Sport Horse and 8.2% Trakehner. The brood-mares covered in the same period were approximately 43% Brazilian stock of unknown descent, 36% Brazilian Sport Horse and 11% Thoroughbred.

== Characteristics ==
The Brazilian Sport Horse usually stands at least 162 cm at the withers; average heights are approximately 165 cm for mares and 168 cm for stallions and geldings, with average body weights of 550 kg and 600 kgrespectively. The coat is most often bay, dark bay or chestnut.

== Uses ==
Like other sport horse breeds, the Brazilian Sport Horse was bred and selected specifically for equestrian competition, particularly in show jumping, dressage and three-day eventing.
