= Swedish Warmblood =

Swedish breed of horse

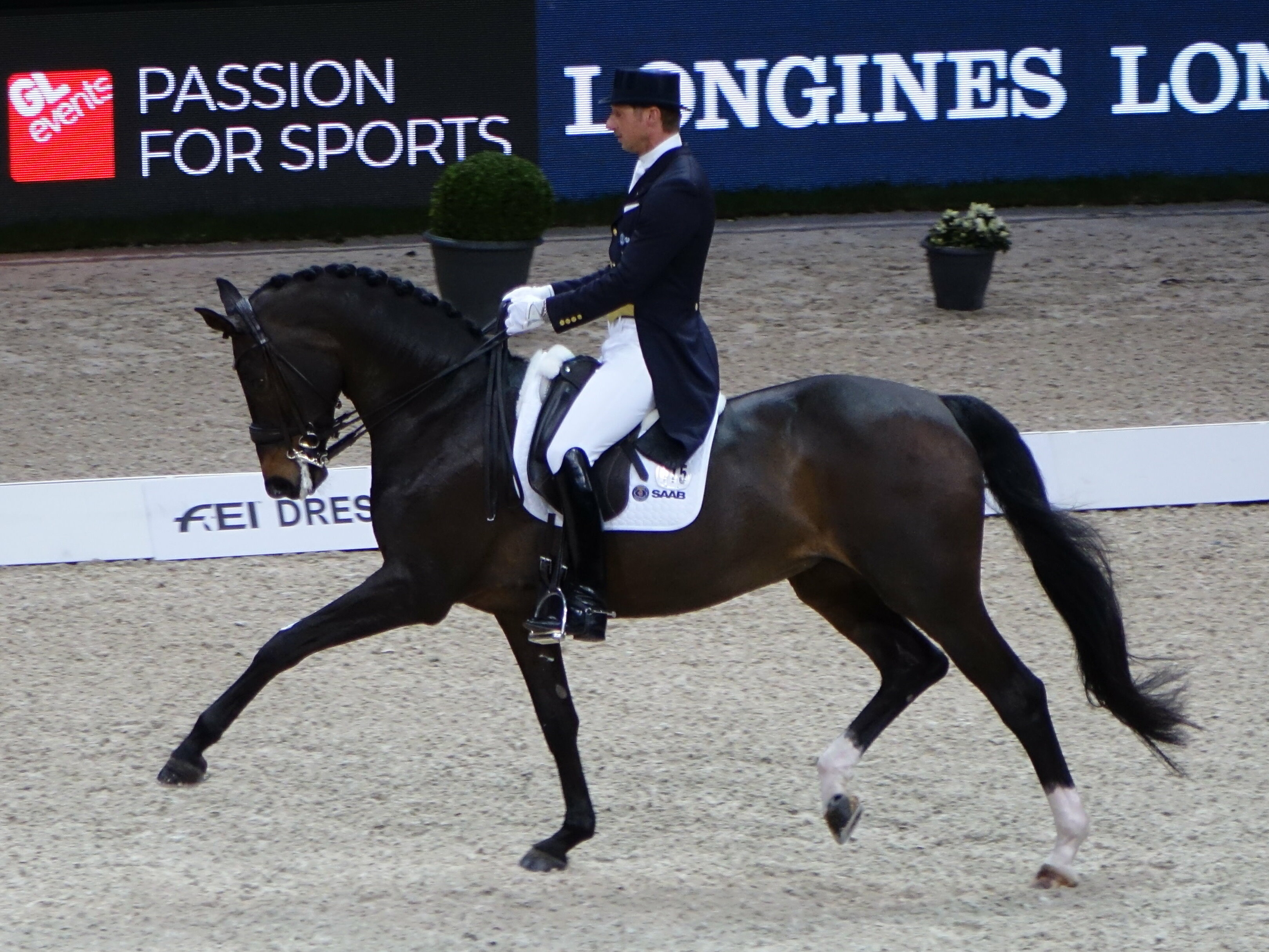
- Patrik Kittel and Deja at the Dressage World Cup in Paris in 2018
- Conservation status: FAO (2007): not at risk; DAD-IS (2022): not at risk
- Other names: Svenskt Halvblod; Svenskt Varmblod; Svensk Warmblodig Häst; Swedish Half-bred
- Country of origin: Sweden
- Distribution: European countries, United States
- Use: dressage; show-jumping; three-day event; driving; riding

Traits
- Weight: Male: 650 kg; Female: 600 kg
- Height: Male: 170 cm; Female: 165 cm
- Colour: any solid colour

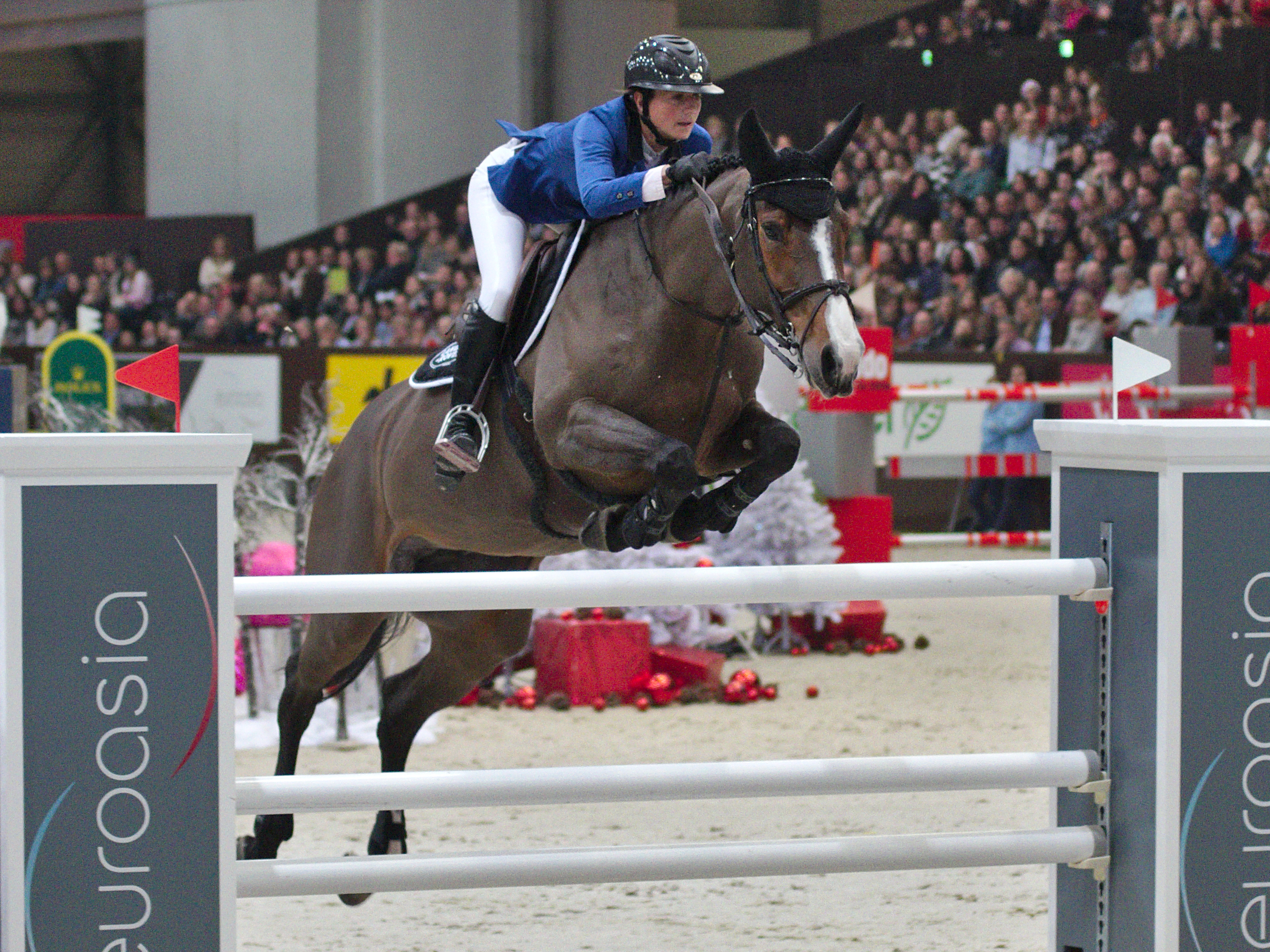
Pénélope Leprevost and Nice Stephanie in Geneva in 2013

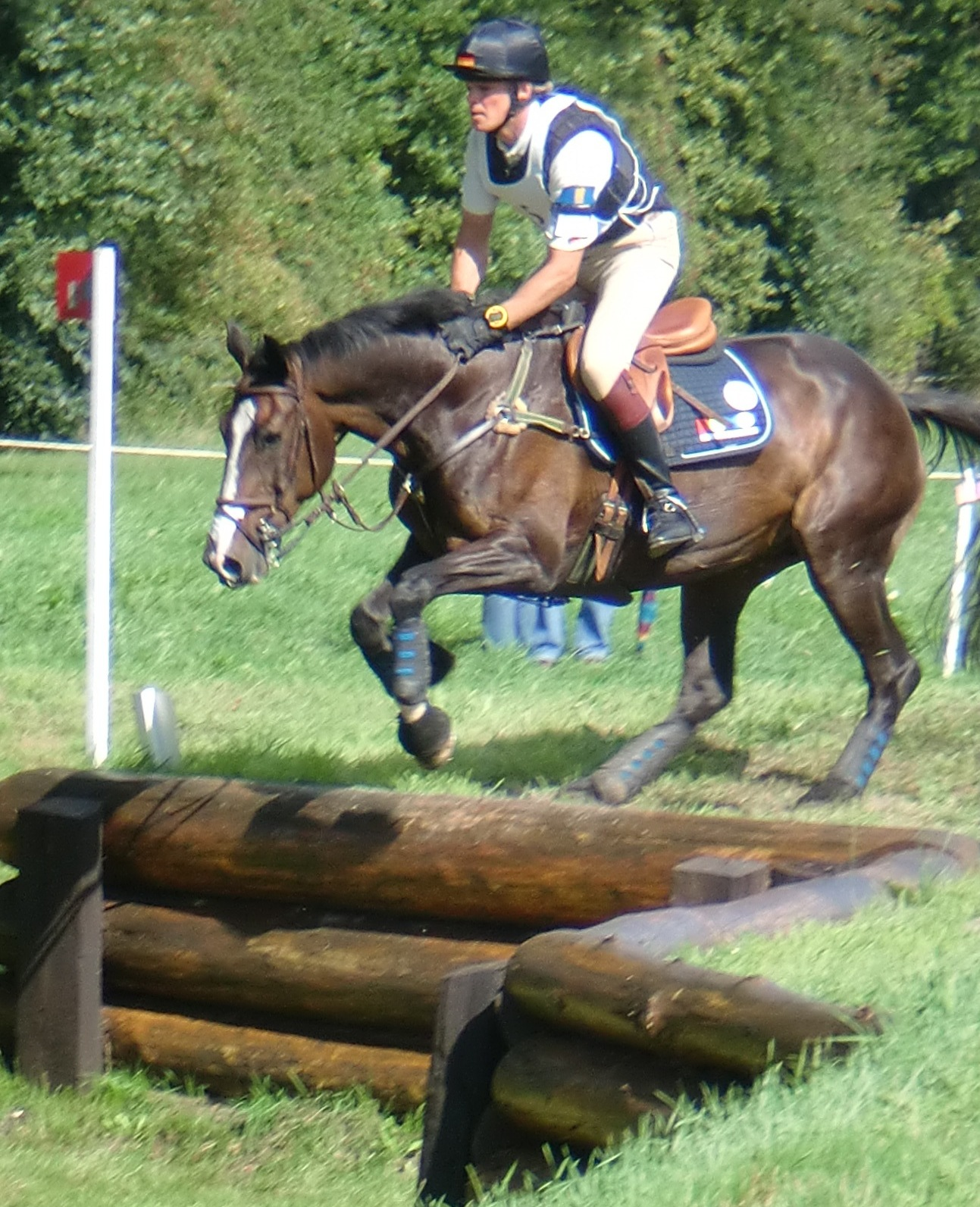
Frank Ostholt on Swedish Warmblood, eventing, 2010

The Swedish Warmblood is a Swedish breed of warmblood horse. It was originally bred as a cavalry horse at the Strömsholm, Ottenby and Flyinge studs. In the twentieth century it became a general-purpose riding and sport horse. It performs well in dressage, show-jumping and three-day eventing, and also as a harness horse.

== Characteristics ==
The Swedish Warmblood usually stands between 164 and 170 cm at the withers. The coat may be of any solid colour. As in other warmblood breeds, selection of stallions approved for breeding is based on a performance evaluation.

== Breed history ==
The origins of the Swedish Warmblood lie in the seventeenth century, when foreign horses were imported to Sweden from various countries, mostly in Europe, and were cross-bred with mares of local stock to produce horses suitable for military use. Of these imports, Spanish and Friesian animals were the most important; others came from Denmark, England, France, the German-speaking area, Hungary, the Ottoman Empire and Russia. Breeding took place at the stud-farm of Strömsholm in Västmanland, which was established in 1621; at the Ottenby Stud on the island of Öland; and at the Flyinge Royal Stud at Flyinge in Skåne, which dates from 1658.

In the late nineteenth and early twentieth centuries there were further imports, of sport horses of Arab, Thoroughbred, Hanoverian and particularly of Trakehner stock. These were used to increase the size and power of the breed and to make it more consistent in type. It became a general-purpose riding and sport horse.

A stud-book was begun in 1874. In 1928 a breed society, the Avelsförening för Svenska Varmblodiga Hästen or Swedish Warmblood Association, was formed. The stud-book is open to registration of horses already registered in an approved foreign warmblood stud-book.

== Use ==
It is a good general-purpose riding and sport horse. It performs well in dressage, show-jumping and three-day eventing, and also as a harness horse.
