= American Warmblood =

Type of horse

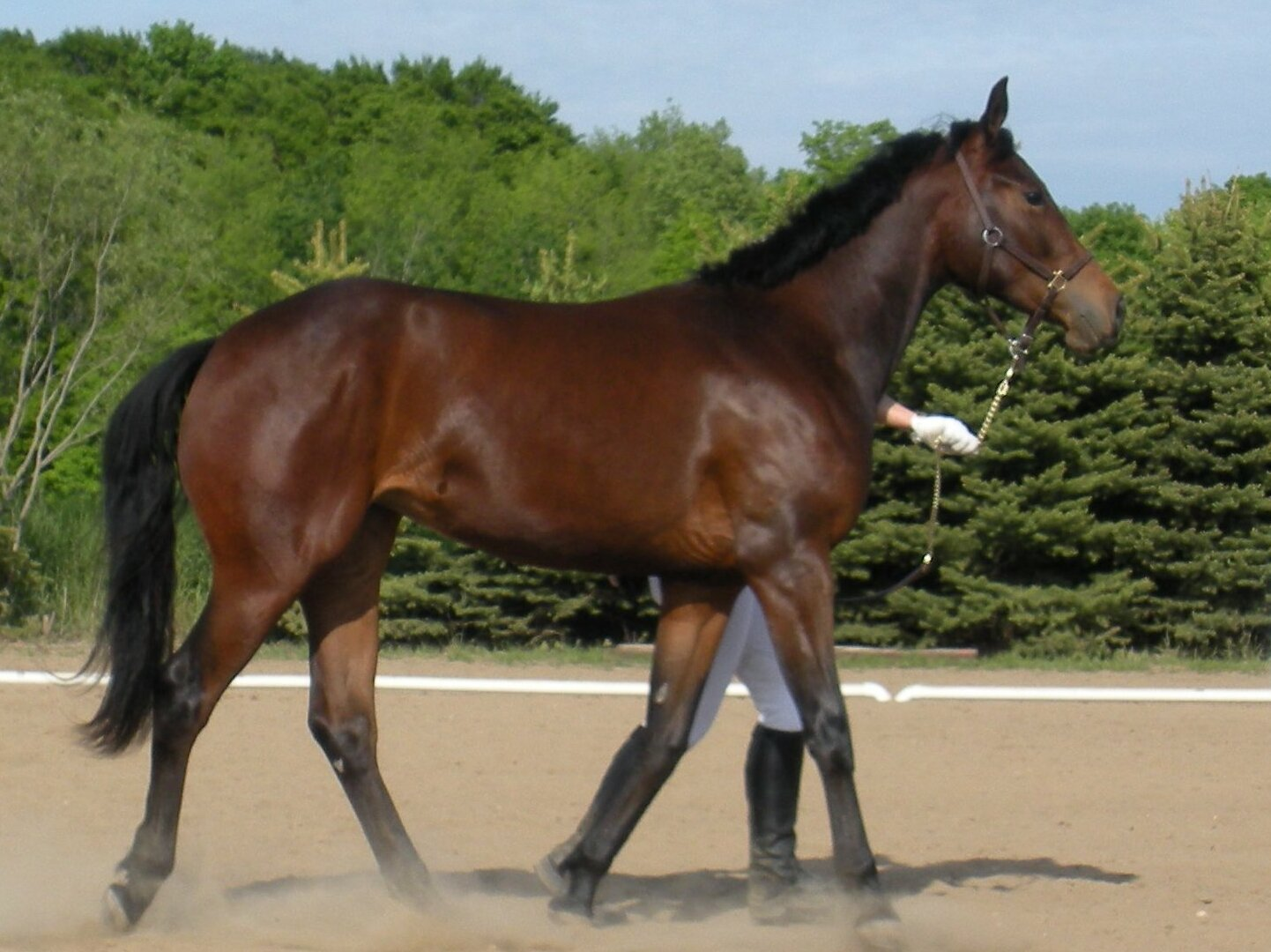

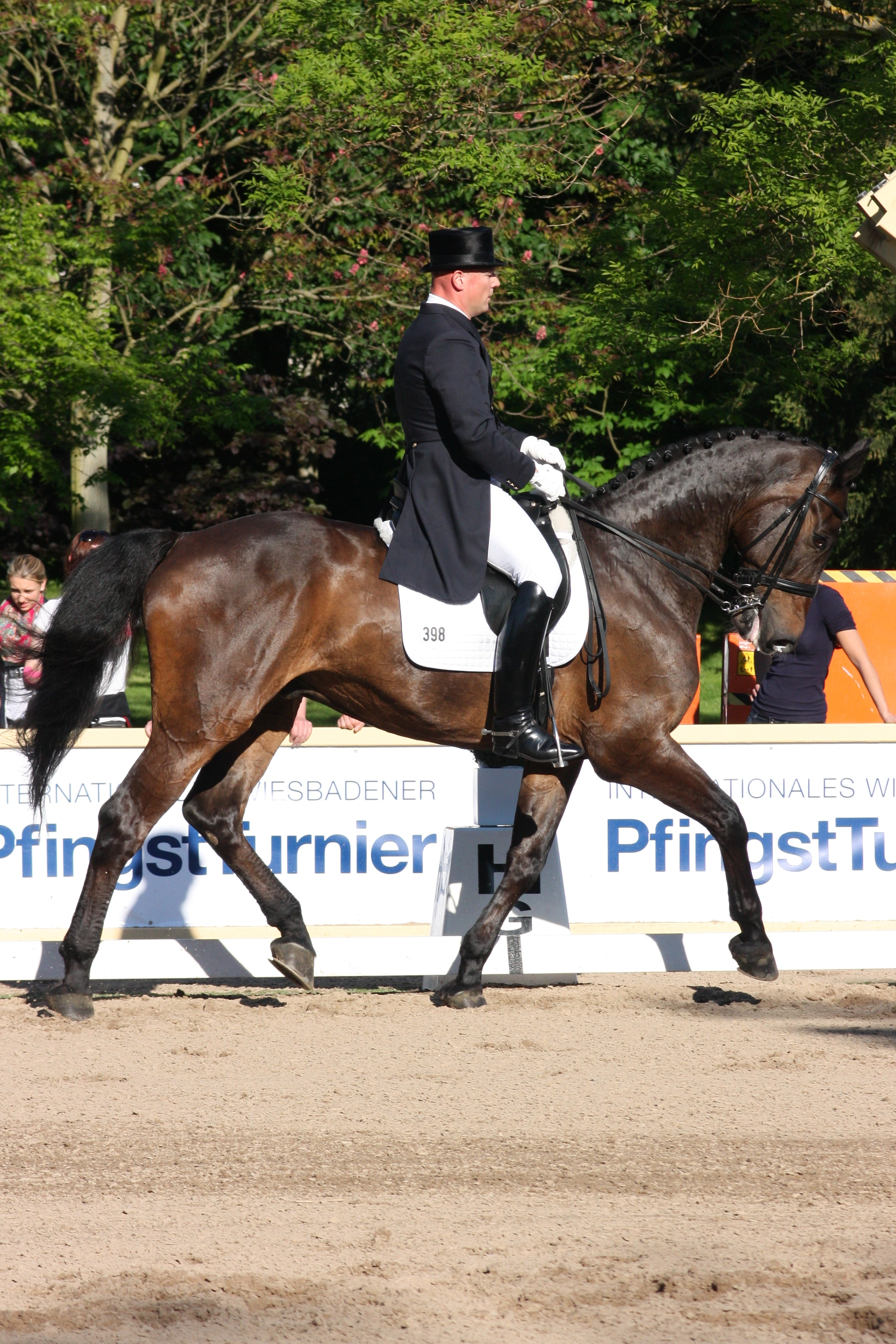
- Country of origin: United States

Traits
- Distinguishing features: Sport horse type, can be any size or color, but are primarily 15-17 hands and solid colored

Breed standards
- American Warmblood Registry; American Warmblood Society & Sporthorse Registry

The American Warmblood is a horse of warmblood type, intended primarily for the sport horse disciplines of dressage, show jumping, eventing and combined driving. As of 2007, the American Warmblood was still too genetically varied to be recognized as a breed, and is considered a type.

== Characteristics ==
The American Warmblood is usually between 15 and 17 hands (60 and 68 inches, 152 and 173 cm) high and may come in any color, though the solid colors are the most common. Horses of nearly all bloodlines are eligible for registration as American Warmbloods, as long as they are of a sport horse or warmblood type, and are able to meet the appropriate studbook selection or performance criteria. Breeding stock must pass even more stringent inspection and/or performance criteria.

The emphasis is on the quality of each individual horse, for both registration and breeding approval. While the ideal horse for registration is already a warmblood type, there are no breed restrictions, and horses which are hot or cold blooded, though not typical, can be registered if they can meet the registry's performance standards. Horses which fail to meet, or have yet to meet, these performance criteria may still be issued recording papers, but are not considered registered American Warmbloods until they satisfy performance or inspection standards.

== Breed history ==
The American Warmblood Registry was founded in 1981, and the American Warmblood Society in 1983. The AWR is a member of the World Breeding Federation for Sport Horses. Similar to many European warmblood registries, the American Warmblood has an open stud book with a focus on type, conformation, and performance. There is more emphasis on producing quality sport horses, rather than the preservation of any particular bloodlines, which allows for a high degree of genetic diversity in the bloodlines of American Warmbloods.

== See also ==
- Warmblood
- List of horse breeds
