= Luxembourg Warmblood =

Luxembourgeois breed of warmblood sport horse

- Conservation status: DAD-IS (2019): at risk
- Other names: Cheval de Selle Luxembourgeois
- Country of origin: Luxembourg

Traits
- Weight: Male: 600 kg; Female: 500 kg
- Height: 1.62–1.70 m; Male: 1.68 m; Female: 1.62 m
- Colour: bay, chestnut

The Luxembourg Warmblood or French: Cheval de Selle Luxembourgeois is a Luxembourgeois breed of warmblood sport horse. As with other European warmblood sport horses, admission to the stud-book is based on performance rather than parentage. Warmblood breeding within Luxembourg derives mostly from Holsteiner and Hanoverian stock imported from Germany.

From 1970 registration was through the Fédération des Stud-Books Luxembourgeois, a federation of stud-books. In 1999 it was dissolved and the Stud-Book du Cheval de Selle Luxembourgeois was established as an independent non-profit organisation.
