= New Zealand Warmblood Horse Association =

The New Zealand Warmblood Horse Association has the objective is to produce a warmblood horse that is noble, correctly built, with good rideability and superior performance.

Originally, the NZWHA started in 1978 as the Hanoverian Breeders Association, and the first stallions were imported with a Hanoverian background. A year later, the NZWHA was incorporated and the first stallions were of a Hanoverian or KWPN (Dutch Warmblood) background. Early stallions who had a major influence were Witzbold, Jaguar, Falkensee, Loewenherz and later Anamour and Dream Boy.

Today, there are a larger number of imported stallions available that are approved by the NZWHA.
