= Danish Warmblood =

Breed of horse

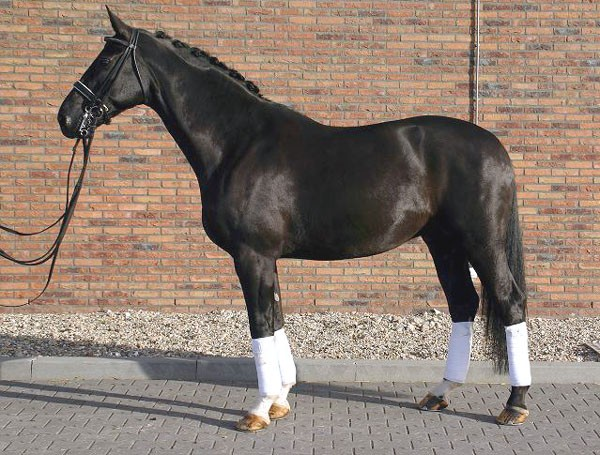
- Conservation status: FAO (2007): not at risk; DAD-IS (2021): unknown
- Other names: Dansk Varmblod
- Country of origin: Denmark

Traits
- Height: 160–173 cm
- Colour: dark colours

The Danish Warmblood or Dansk Varmblod is a Danish breed of modern sport horse, established in the mid-twentieth century and used mainly for dressage and show-jumping. Like other European warmblood breeds, it is a performance breed: any suitable horse of any origin may be admitted if it passes a strict performance test. Hanoverian, Holsteiner, Swedish Warmblood and Trakehner are among those that have contributed to the breed.

Frederiksborger mares were also used as foundation stock, as breeders found that crossing Frederiksborger mares with Thoroughbred stallions created a "qood quality, but slightly heavy-weight riding horse". F1 crosses were further refined with outcrossing to other European warmblood breeds, such as the Wielkopolski and Selle Français, as well as more Thoroughbred crossing.

== History ==
The Danish Warmblood came into existence in 1962 with the formation of a breed society, the Dansk Sportsheste Avlsforbund; in 1979 this merged with another association, the Danmarks Lette Hesteavl, to form the present association, Dansk Varmblod. The first volume of the stud-book was published in 1964, and listed 150 mares. Most were imported from outside Denmark – more than 100 were of German breeding – and of the 22 born in Denmark the majority were of Oldenburger origin.

== Characteristics ==
The horses usually stand some 160–173 cm at the withers. The coat may be of any solid colour; bay is the most common, but chestnut, grey and dark bay also occur. Limited white markings may be present.

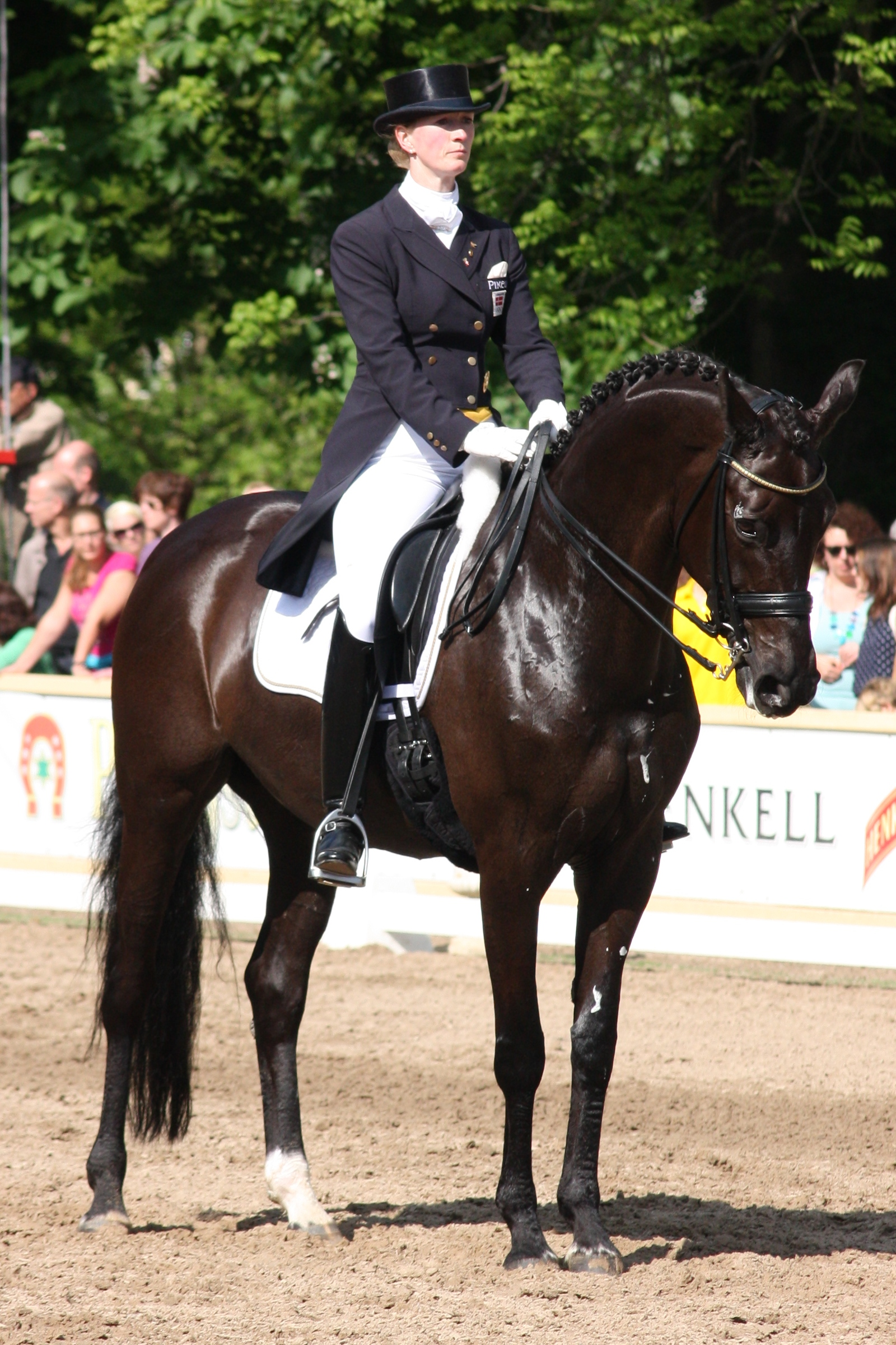
Nathalie zu Sayn-Wittgenstein on Fabienne at the Internationales Pfingstturnier Wiesbaden in 2013

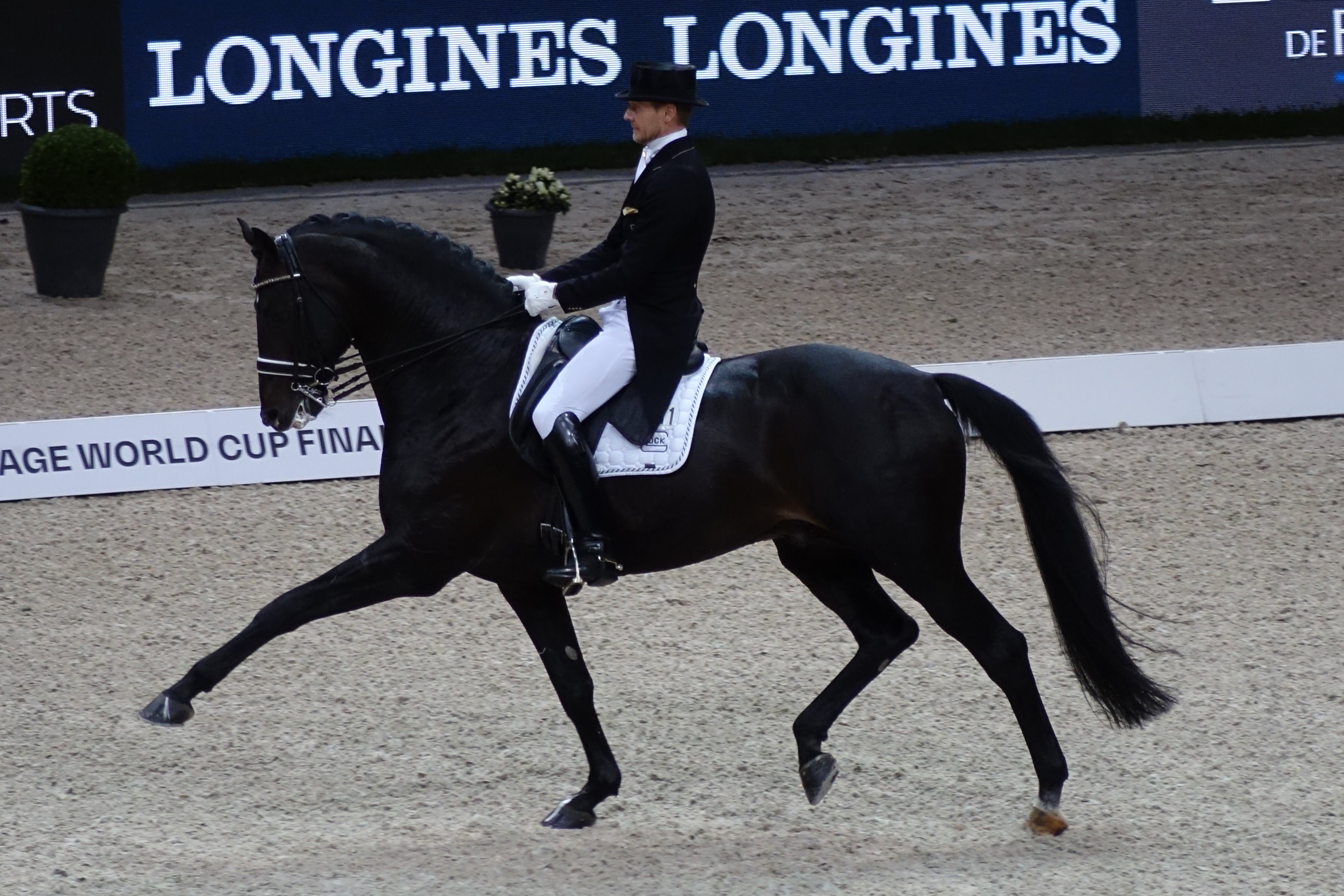
Edward Gal on Glock's Zonik N.O.P. at the FEI Dressage World Cup in 2018
