= Romanian Sport Horse =

Romanian breed of horse

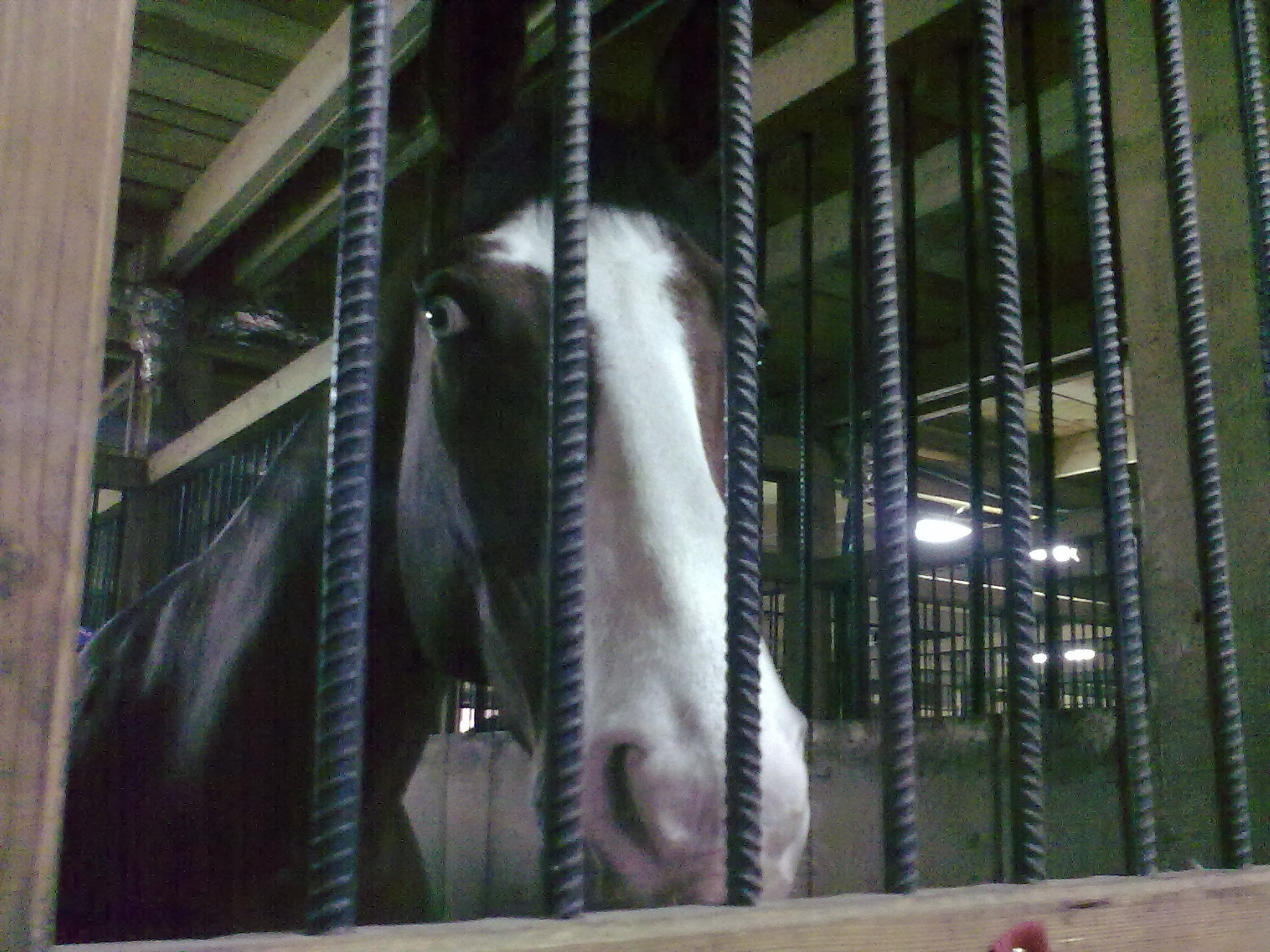
- Conservation status: FAO (2007): critical; DAD-IS (2025): unknown
- Other names: Romanian: Cal de sport romanesc; Romanian Saddle Horse; Romanian Warmblood
- Country of origin: Romania
- Use: riding horse; carriage horse; show horse; dressage; show-jumping; three-day event

Traits
- Height: 157–162 cm
- Colour: dark colours, roan

The Romanian Sport Horse or Romanian Saddle Horse, Romanian: Cal de sport romanesc, is a Romanian breed of light riding horse. It was bred from 1962 from a variety of other breeds including Arab, Furioso-North Star, Gidran, Romanian Trotter and Thoroughbred. It is used as a carriage horse, for riding, for showing and as a sport horse. In competition, it may be used in dressage, in show-jumping or in the three-day event.

A total population of 100 was reported for the breed in 2003; no data has been reported since. In 2025 the conservation status of the breed was unknown.
