= Yasnaya Polyana, Kaliningrad Oblast =

Rural settlement in Russia

Yasnaya Polyana Я́сная Поля́на
- Rural locality
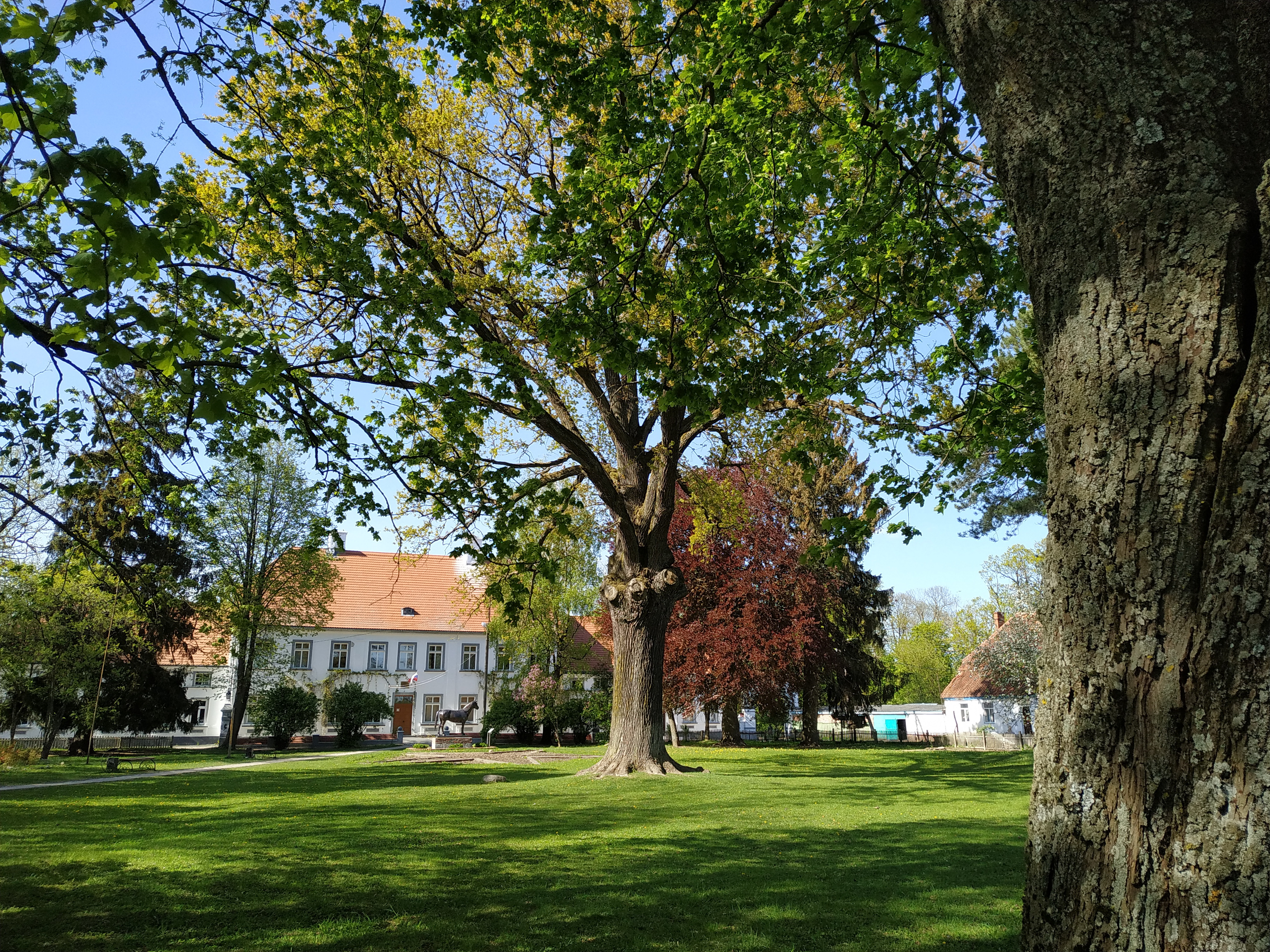
- Yasnaya Polyana park
- Interactive map of Yasnaya Polyana
- Location of Yasnaya Polyana Yasnaya Polyana (European Russia) Yasnaya Polyana (Russia)
- Coordinates: 54°34′07″N 22°26′46″E
- Country: Russia
- Federal subject: Kaliningrad Oblast
- Administrative district: Nesterovsky District
- Elevation: 77 m (253 ft)

Population (2010 Census)
  - Total: 997
  - Estimate (2010): 997 (0%)
- Time zone: UTC+2 (MSK–1)
- Postal code: 238012
- OKTMO ID: 27624402176

Yasnaya Polyana (Russian: Я́сная Поля́на; German: Trakehnen, from 1929 Groß Trakehnen; Lithuanian: Trakėnai; Polish: Trakeny) is a rural settlement (posyolok) in the Nesterovsky District of Kaliningrad Oblast, Russia. It is located in the southeast of the oblast, north of the Romincka Forest. Nearby Diwnoje Nowoje is a railway station on the former Prussian Eastern Railway from Kaliningrad to Kybartai in Lithuania.

== History ==
The settlement was originally named after the Old Prussian word trakis, meaning "great bog". It was known as Trakėnai in Lithuanian, Trakeny in Polish, and Trakehnen in German. In 1454, King Casimir IV Jagiellon incorporated the region to the Kingdom of Poland upon the request of the anti-Teutonic Prussian Confederation. After the subsequent Thirteen Years' War (1454–1466), it became a part of Poland as a fief held by the Teutonic Knights.

From the 18th century it formed part of the Kingdom of Prussia. In 1731 King Frederick William I of Prussia had the swampy territory of the Pissa River drained to establish the famous warmblood Trakehner horse breed stable (Königliches Stutamt Trakehnen) northwest of the municipality. The area was colonized by Protestant expellees from the Archbishopric of Salzburg.

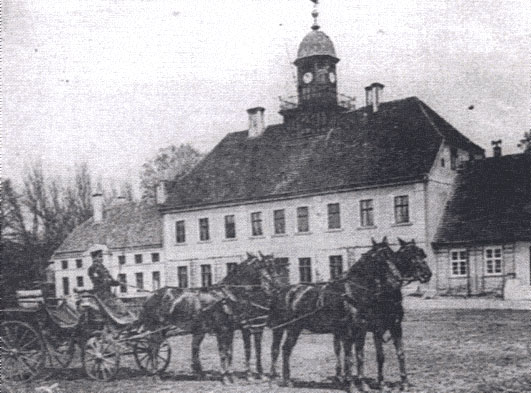
Stud house, late 19th century

Intended for the build-up of an own breeding supplying the Prussian Army cavalry, the stud farm at the time of its opening in 1732 had about 1,100 horses standing on an area of 25 km^{2} (9.7 sq mi). The "Soldier King" however soon became dissatisfied with the poor efficiency of the stud farm and in 1739 granted it to his son, crown prince Frederick II of Prussia. Upon Frederick's death in 1786, it was taken over by the Prussian state and renamed Königlich Preußisches Hauptgestüt Trakehnen. In professional hands, the stud and the village of Trakehnen prospered from that time on.

The Trakehnen stud farm had to be evacuated after the Prussian defeat at the 1806 Battle of Jena-Auerstedt, when the French Grande Armée approached to meet the Russian forces at the Eylau. From 1871, it was part of Germany, within which it was administratively located in the Stallupönen district in the Regierungsbezirk Gumbinnen in the province of East Prussia. From 1911 on it was the site of an annual cross-country race, named in the memory of Colmar von der Goltz in 1931.

After the Red Army had occupied the settlement at the end of World War II, it passed to the Soviet Union and was renamed to Yasnaya Polyana ("clear glade"). Although the settlement received a new name, the Russian name has a similar reference to the land, as Polje means "field" or "glade". The land was off-limits to all people outside of the Soviet Union for fifty years and information about it was almost non-existent. After the fall of the Iron Curtain, a few ethnic Germans from Russia and Kazakhstan were resettled to Yasnaya Polyana.

It was not maintained as a stable, although the grounds do have a museum for the breed. Russian and German initiatives have brought Trakehner horses to nearby Pravdinsk and Mayovka.

== Notable people ==
- Karl Wilhelm Ammon, German hippiatrist and author
- Gustav von Below (1791–1852), Prussian general
- Walther Funk (1890–1960), Nazi politician
- Wilhelm Kuebart (1913-1993), German officer and resistane fighter involved in the July 20, 1944 plot
- Heinz Ziegler (1894–1972), Wehrmacht general

== See also ==
- List of inhabited localities in Kaliningrad Oblast
