= Downlands Cancara =

Horse known for representing Lloyds bank

- Breed: Trakehner
- Discipline: Television advertising, personal appearances
- Sex: Stallion
- Foaled: 1 May 1975
- Died: June 2006 (aged 31)
- Country: England
- Color: Black
- Owner: Lloyds Bank

Other awards
- Royal Doulton centenary limited issue figurine

Honors
- Represented Lloyds Bank as the Black Horse for many years

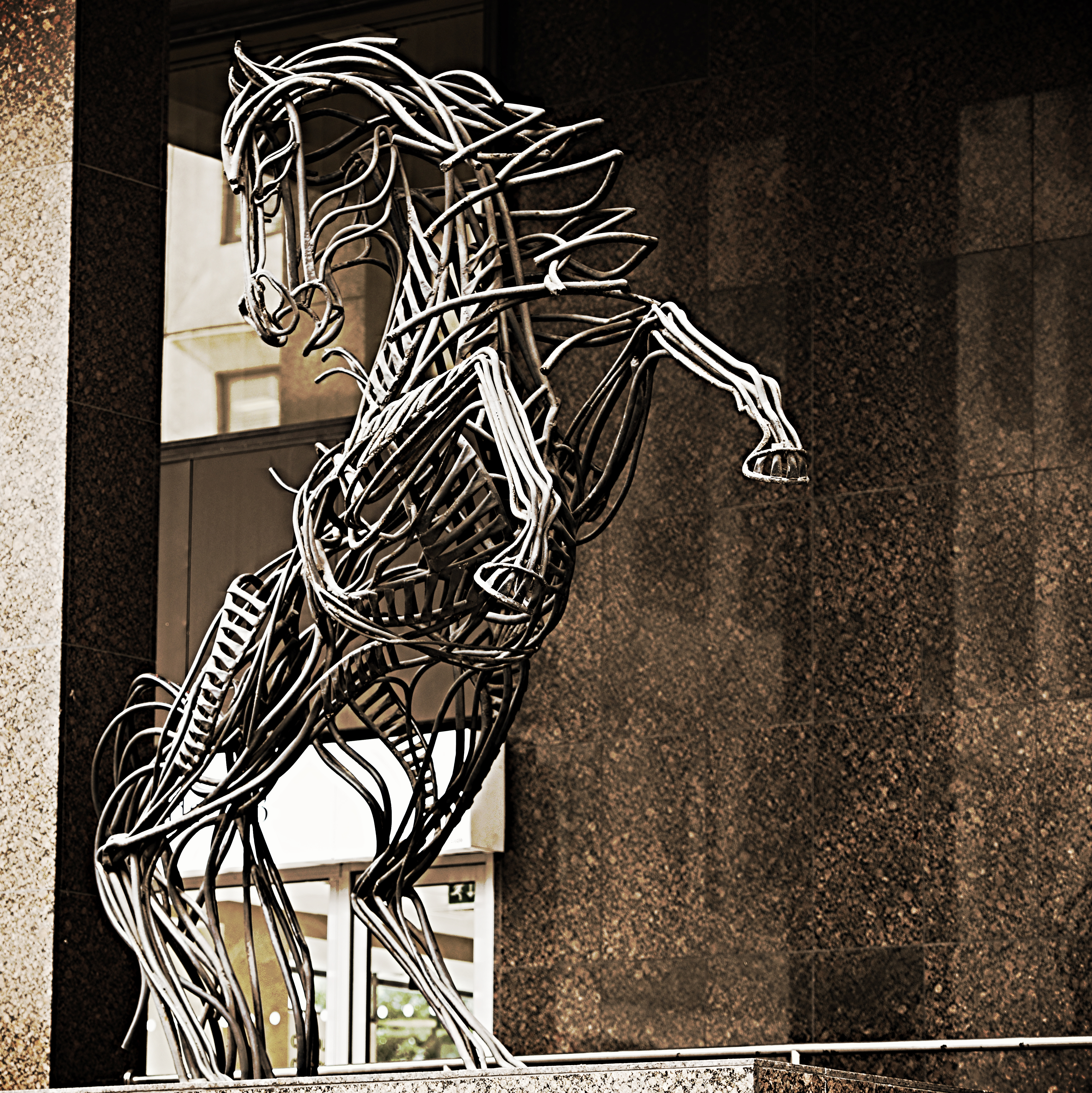
Park Row Leeds, West Yorkshire.

Downlands Cancara (1 May 1975 – June 2006) was an English graded Trakehner stallion famous for representing Lloyds Bank as the Black Horse in a long-running series of television adverts.

== Television work ==
Downlands Cancara was selected to become the horse used in the bank's TV adverts in 1988 and filming for the first took place in 1989. It was shot on the sands of Pentewan Bay in Cornwall and showed a black horse galloping through the surf along the wide deserted beach. The adverts featured Nigel Havers and Jan Francis. Cancara then went on to star in the Bank's "Legendary Service" campaign where he was seen rearing on top of a waterfall in a fantasy land of princesses, giants and goblins. In fact he was filmed, rearing, at his home near Petersfield, Hampshire, then superimposed onto a model of a sugar waterfall created and shot at Pinewood Studios, just for the commercials.

== Personal appearances ==
Cancara also represented Lloyds Bank, and subsequently Lloyds TSB, with numerous personal appearances. These included opening the Great Yorkshire Show and at the Royal Welsh Show and the New Forest Show. Some of the other highlights of Cancara's career included press calls for the Annual Fashion Awards where he was regularly surrounded by supermodels, launching Lloyds Bank's sponsorship of the BAFTA Awards with Richard Attenborough and David Puttnam, becoming Royal Doulton’s centenary limited issue figurine and thereafter having one presented to Steven Spielberg, Mel Gibson and "Mulder and Scully" at the BAFTA Awards as well as being present at the announcement concerning the merger of Lloyds and TSB Banks. He also had an official fan club in Horse and Pony Magazine.

== Charity work ==
Downlands Cancara assisted in raising many hundreds of thousands of pounds for charity, supporting such organisations as The Macmillan Nurse Appeal, Riding for the Disabled, his local Rowan's Hospice, The International League for the Protection of Horses, (now World Horse Welfare) Special Wishes for terminally ill young people and Children in Need, where he walked from Lloyds Bank in Cosham to Lloyds Bank Head Offices in the City of London, visiting Lloyds branches along the way.
