= Aramis (horse) =

- Breed: Hanoverian
- Sire: Argentan (Hanoverian)
- Grandsire: Absatz (Hanoverian)
- Dam: Elfenfee (Westphalian)
- Maternal grandsire: Exstream (Thoroughbred)
- Sex: Gelding
- Foaled: 1977; Germany
- Died: 1989 (aged 11–12); United States
- Country: Canada
- Colour: Bay, 4 white socks, blaze
- Trainer: Mario Deslauriers

Aramis (1977–1989) was a Hanoverian gelding, a showjumper ridden by Mario Deslauriers who competed for Canada at the 1984 Olympics in Los Angeles, where the Canadians took a team fourth place. Aramis also won the 1984 World Cup in showjumping.

== Pedigree ==
Pedigree of Aramis
Sire Argentan 1967 Hanoverian	Absatz; 1960; Hanoverian	Abglanz; 1943	Termit - 1933
Sire Argentan 1967 Hanoverian	Absatz; 1960; Hanoverian	Abglanz; 1943	Abendluft - 1933
Sire Argentan 1967 Hanoverian	Absatz; 1960; Hanoverian	Landmoor; 1947	Landeck - 1943
Sire Argentan 1967 Hanoverian	Absatz; 1960; Hanoverian	Landmoor; 1947	Schlinka - 1941
Sire Argentan 1967 Hanoverian	Worms; 1960; Hanoverian	Wohlan; 1955	Frustra II - 1943
Sire Argentan 1967 Hanoverian	Worms; 1960; Hanoverian	Wohlan; 1955	Friesenamsel - 1950
Sire Argentan 1967 Hanoverian	Worms; 1960; Hanoverian	Landschaft; 1950	Lateran - 1943
Sire Argentan 1967 Hanoverian	Worms; 1960; Hanoverian	Landschaft; 1950	Fuchslicht - 1945
Dam Elfenfee 1970 Westphalian	Exstream; 1967; Thoroughbred	Exbury; 1959	Le Haar - 1954
Dam Elfenfee 1970 Westphalian	Exstream; 1967; Thoroughbred	Exbury; 1959	Greensward - 1953
Dam Elfenfee 1970 Westphalian	Exstream; 1967; Thoroughbred	Reel In; 1952	Jock Scot - 1945
Dam Elfenfee 1970 Westphalian	Exstream; 1967; Thoroughbred	Reel In; 1952	Millstream - 1941
Dam Elfenfee 1970 Westphalian	Finett; 1963; Westphalian	Firn; 1951	Fesch - 1936
Dam Elfenfee 1970 Westphalian	Finett; 1963; Westphalian	Firn; 1951	Frieda - 1945
Dam Elfenfee 1970 Westphalian	Finett; 1963; Westphalian	Fee; 1953	Fernando - 1944
Dam Elfenfee 1970 Westphalian	Finett; 1963; Westphalian	Fee; 1953	Fischerin - 1947
