= Flyinge =

- Location within Skåne Location within Sweden
- Coordinates: 55°45′N 13°21′E
- Country: Sweden
- Province: Skåne
- County: Skåne County
- Municipality: Eslöv Municipality

Area
  - Total: 0.77 km^{2} (0.30 sq mi)

Population (31 December 2010)
  - Total: 994
  - Density: 1,284/km^{2} (3,330/sq mi)
- Time zone: UTC+1 (CET)
  - Summer (DST): UTC+2 (CEST)

Flyinge is a locality situated in Eslöv Municipality, Skåne County, Sweden with 994 inhabitants in 2010.
