= Trakehner =

Breed of horse

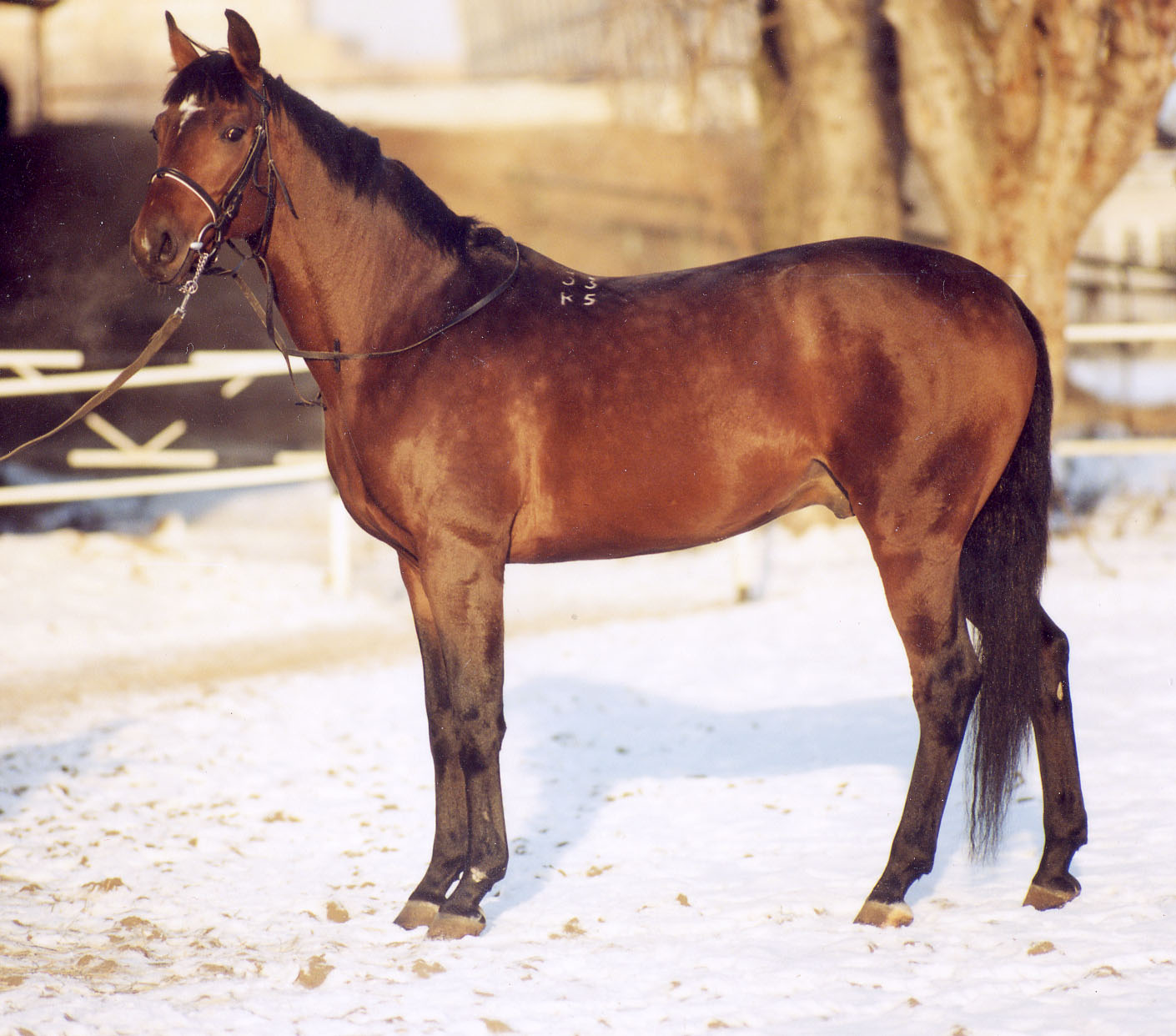

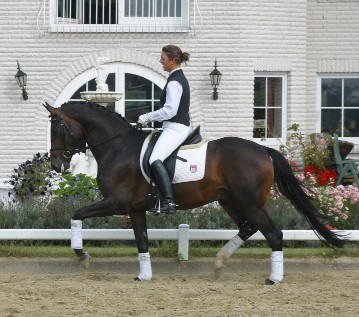
- Country of origin: Prussia

Breed standards
- Trakehner Verband

Trakehner (/trəˈkeɪnər/) is a warmblood breed of horse, originally developed at the East Prussian state stud farm in the town of Trakehnen from which the breed takes its name. The state stud was established in 1731 and operated until 1944, when the fighting of World War II led to the annexing of East Prussia by Russia, and the town containing the stud renamed as Yasnaya Polyana.

The Trakehner typically stands between 15.2 and 17 hands (62 and 68 inches, 157 and 173 cm). They can be any color, with bay, gray, chestnut and black being the most common, though the breed also includes few roan and tobiano pinto horses. It is considered to be the lightest and most refined of the warmbloods, due to its closed stud book which allows entry of only Trakehner, as well as few selected Thoroughbred, Anglo-Arabian, Shagya and Arabian bloodlines.

== Characteristics ==
Owing to its Thoroughbred ancestry, the Trakehner is of rectangular build, with a long sloping shoulder, good hindquarters, short cannons, and a medium-long, crested and well-set neck. The head is often finely chiseled, narrow at the muzzle, with a broad forehead. It is known for its "floating trot" – full of impulsion and suspension. The Trakehner possesses a strong, medium-length back and powerful hindquarters.

Trakehners are athletic and trainable, with good endurance, while some are more spirited than horses of other warmblood breeds. Trakehners breed true to type, due to the purity of the bloodlines, making it valuable for upgrading other warmbloods.

== Breed history ==
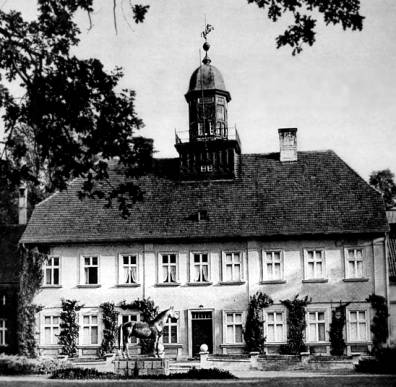
Landstallmeisterhaus in Trakehnen

Old Prussians and other Baltic people such as the Lithuanians were noted for their hardy horses and cavalry during the early Middle Ages. During their conquest of Old Prussians in the 13th century Prussian crusade, the conquering Teutonic Knights named the Old Prussian horse a Schwaikenpferd, a small primitive horse. Beginning in the 14th century, knights used it to breed their military horses, and descendants of the Schwaikenpferd were later used by Masovian and Ostsiedlung farmers for light utility work. During the 16th and 17th centuries, the people of Ducal Prussia, Brandenburg, and Royal Prussia used a wide variety of horses from the Polish–Lithuanian Commonwealth, Crimean Tatars, Ottoman Turkey, Wallachia, Moldavia and Transylvania, Holy Roman Empire for their cavalry and stud horses, crossed on local animals.

In 1732 King Frederick William I of Prussia used these horses and other imports to establish the Trakehnen Stud at the East Prussian town Trakehnen (now Yasnaya Polyana, Russia). Soldiers cleared the forest at the River Pissa between Stallupönen and Gumbinnen. In 1739 the king gave it to crown prince Frederick II of Prussia, who often sold stallions to make money. After his death in 1786 it became state property, named Königlich Preußisches Hauptgestüt Trakehnen.

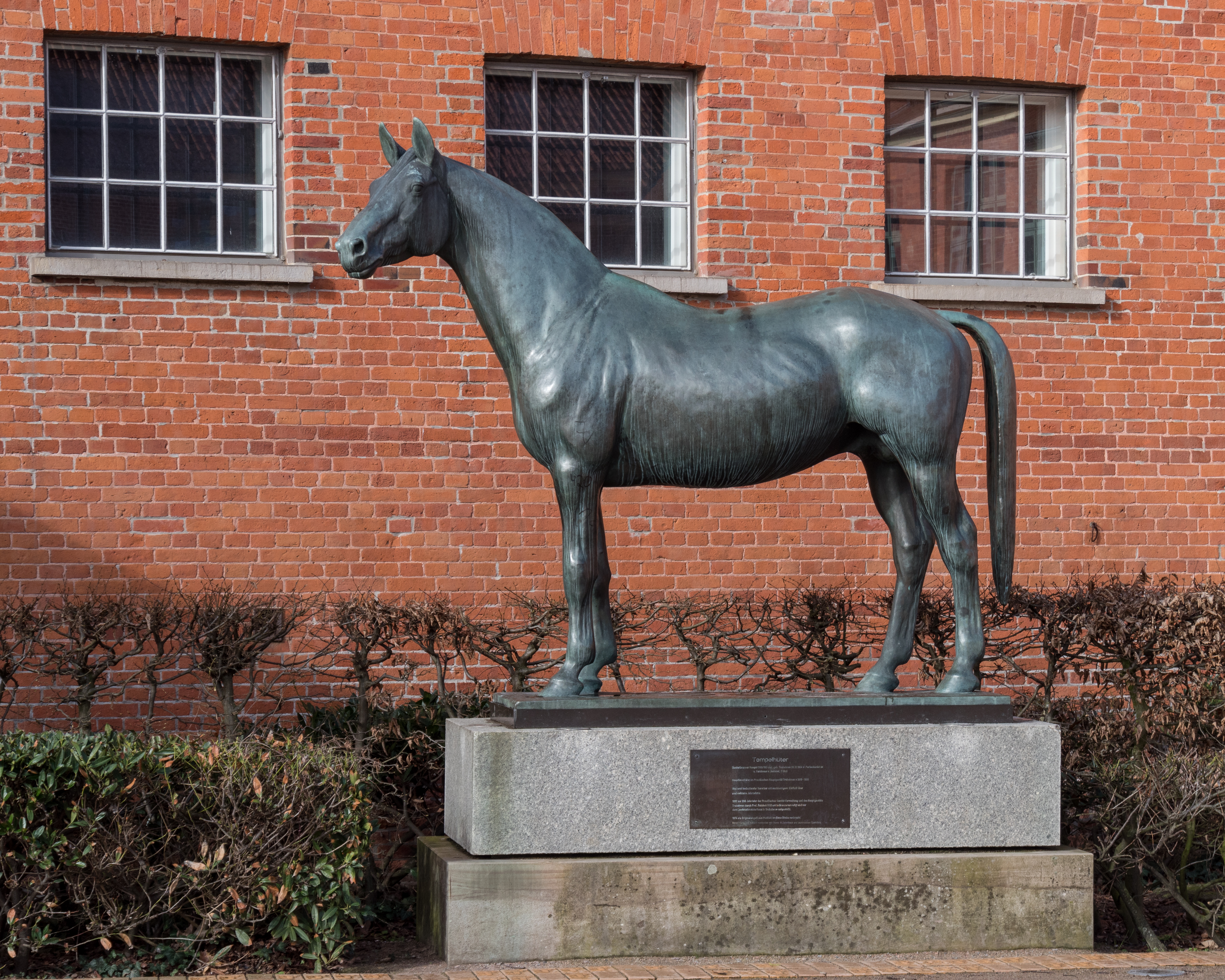
Statue of the stallion "Tempelhüter" in Verden/Aller

Between 1817 and 1837 the stud added Arabian, Thoroughbred, and Hanoverian horse blood to their stock. One especially influential Thoroughbred was Perfectionist, by Persimmon, who won The Derby and the St Leger in 1896. He was to be the sire of the great Trakehner stallion Tempelhüter, and most modern Trakehners can be traced to these two stallions. The Arabian blood was added to offset possible flaws of the Thoroughbred.

East Prussian farmers were encouraged to bring their mares, by then known for their hardiness and quality, to Trakehnen's stallions. This enabled the rapid transformation of the breed into much sought-after army remounts: sure-footed, intelligent and athletic. By 1918 60,000 mares per year were bred to East Prussian stallions.

In 1919 the Treaty of Versailles limited Germany's army to 100,000 troops and so the breed's focus was again turned to producing horses suitable to farm duties. For this purpose, sires of heavier conformation (build) were used, the most successful being Ararad, Dampfross, Hyperion, Pythagoras and Tempelhüter. These stallions, while refined, possessed much substance and bone. Their influence is still seen on the modern Trakehner.

It was during the 1920s and 1930s that the breed was recognized for its performance abilities in competitive disciplines. Trakehners won gold and silver medals in two Olympics, including six gold medals in Berlin in 1936, and won Czechoslovakia's notoriously challenging Velká pardubická steeplechase nine times. In the 1930s there were more than 10,000 breeders and 18,000 registered mares.

In the 1930s and early 1940s Hauptvorwerk Trakehnen and its 15 Vorwerke covered 6,033 hectares (14,910 acres), of which 3,845 hectares (9,500 acres) were fields, 2,427 hectares (6,000 acres) meadows, 175 hectares (430 acres) forest, 73 hectares (180 acres) garden and 351 hectares (870 acres) other. Horses such as the Trakehner were used in World War II which, at the end, nearly destroyed the breed as Soviet troops advanced from the East, causing flight and expulsion of Germans during and after WWII. The main Stud and local residents were forced to evacuate between 20 January 1945 and March 1945. Their journey West, known as Der Treck ("The Flight"), sent the horses on a dangerous journey in frigid conditions across the frozen Vistula lagoon without proper rations or shelter. It is considered one of the toughest tests to which an entire breed of horses has been submitted.

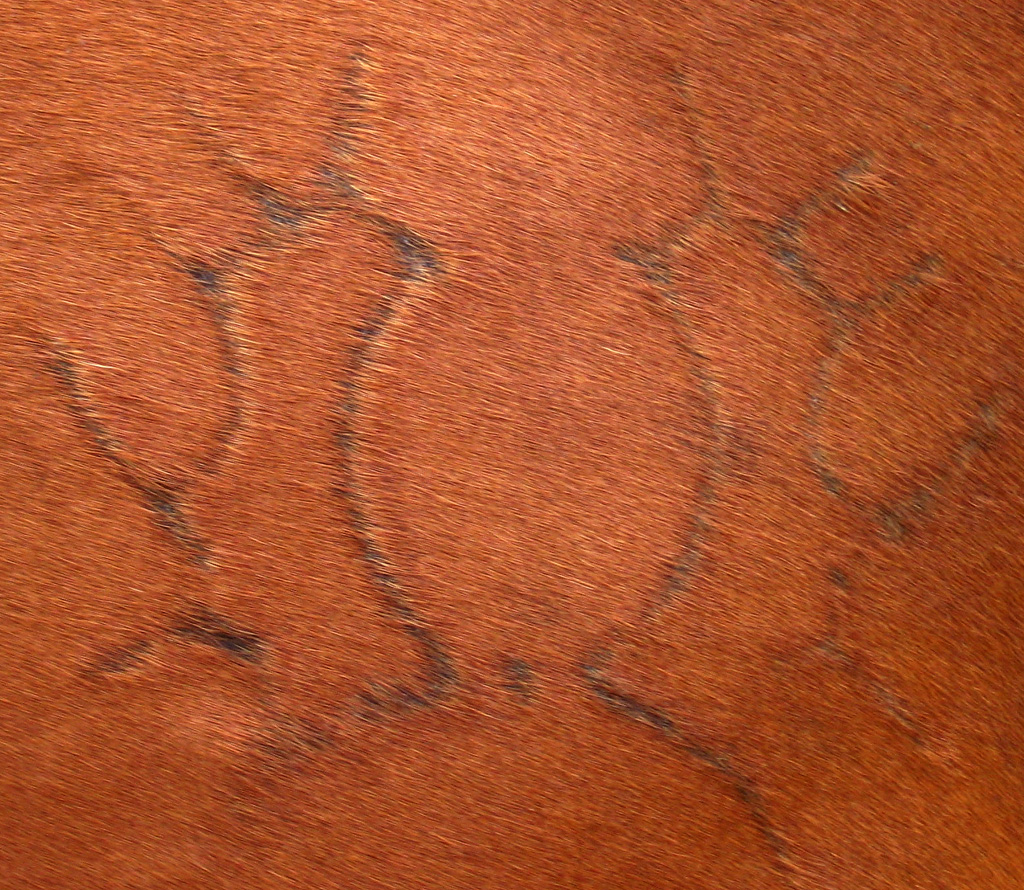
Ostpreußische Elchschaufel moose antlers, the Trakehner brand

Refugee convoys were bombed while on the ice by the Soviet airforce, so only a small number of horses made it to safety. 700 surviving horses were accounted for. The horses left behind in East Prussia became important in the breeding of Russian breeds such as the Kirov as well as the Polish Mazury (also known as the Masuren) and Pozan (or Poznan), which developed into the Wielkopolski. After the war, the breed, which once numbered tens of thousands was reduced to approximately 600 broodmares and 50 stallions in West Germany. The last original Trakehner was Keith, born there in 1941, who died in November 1976 in Gilten shortly before his 35th birthday. On 23 October 1947 the East Prussian Studbook Society was dissolved and the Association of Breeders and Friends of the Warmblood Horse of Trakehner Origin, known today as the Trakehner Verband, was created. Among the greatest obstacles the organization faced was that unlike other German breeds, the Trakehner had no mother state and could not depend on government funding. The re-establishment of the breed originally depended on the determination of its members and the largesse of others.

True pure-bred Trakehner show the Ostpreußische Elchschaufel (East Prussian moose horn) branding.

== The modern Trakehner ==
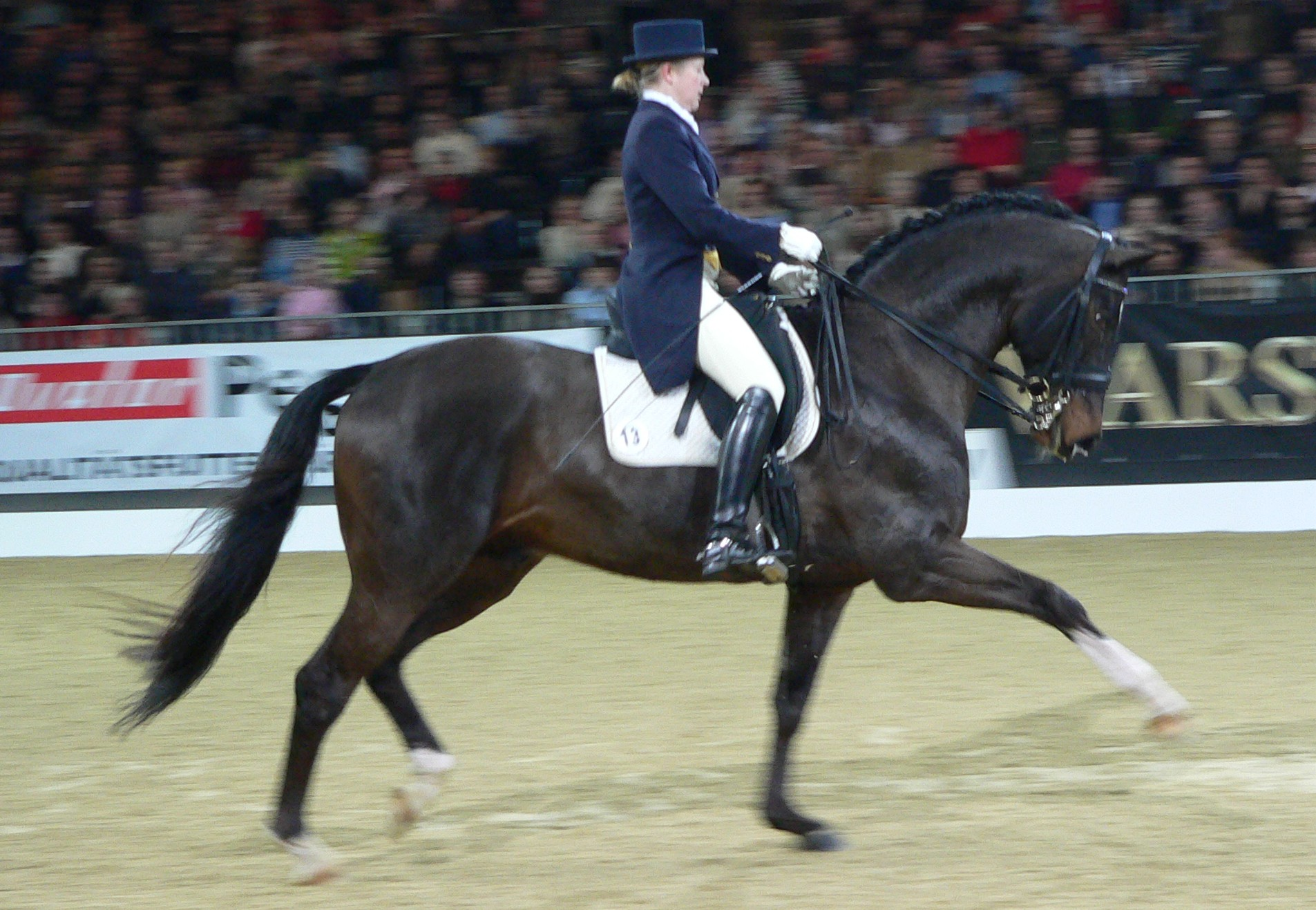
The modern Trakehner excels in dressage

Today in Germany the breed is considered a federal responsibility, with its governance falling under both the Trakehner Verband and the Trakehner Gesellschaft mbH; the latter handling all business operations.

Stallion inspections are held in Neumünster, Germany, each October and approved stallions are required to complete extended performance tests, which rate the horses' gaits, temperament, jumping ability, and suitability over a cross country course, before being given full breeding licenses.

The Trakehner is used as a "refiner" of other breeds, allowing an infusion of Thoroughbred and Arabian blood without the risks often involved in first generation outcrosses. Influential stallions include Abglanz for the Hanoverian, Herbststurm who influenced the Oldenburg, Marco Polo for the Dutch Warmblood, the stallions Ibikus and Donauwind for the Danish Warmblood, and Polarstern for the Swedish Warmblood.

While Trakehners compete in nearly all equestrian disciplines, they are particularly prized as dressage mounts, due to their sensitivity, intelligence and way of going. Peron anchored the United States team to an Olympic Bronze in 1996 at Atlanta. Abdullah, by Donauwind, is particularly famous for his show jumping team gold and individual silver medals at the 1984 Olympics and 1985 World Cup win. Heuriger was the 1994 show jumping team silver medalist at the 1994 World Equestrian Games. Trakehner mare TSF Dalera BB, ridden by Jessica von Bredow Werndl, is the no.1 ranked dressage horse in the world as of September 2023, and has won gold medals at the 2020 Tokyo Olympics for both team and individual. Dalera has also won individual gold medals at the 2022 and 2023 Dressage World Cup.

== Famous Trakehners ==
- Abdullah (horse) (1970–2000), on the USA's gold medal-winning show jumping team at the 1984 Olympics
- Downlands Cancara (1975–2006), featured in Lloyds TSB's iconic TV adverts in the UK
- Windfall II (1992– ), in the USA's bronze medal-winning team eventing team at the 2004 Olympics
- Larissa (1989-), 4-star event horse with many top placings both nationally and internationally. She won the team silver at the Pan-American games in 2003.
