= Hanoverian horse =

German breed of warmblood horse

Hanoverian
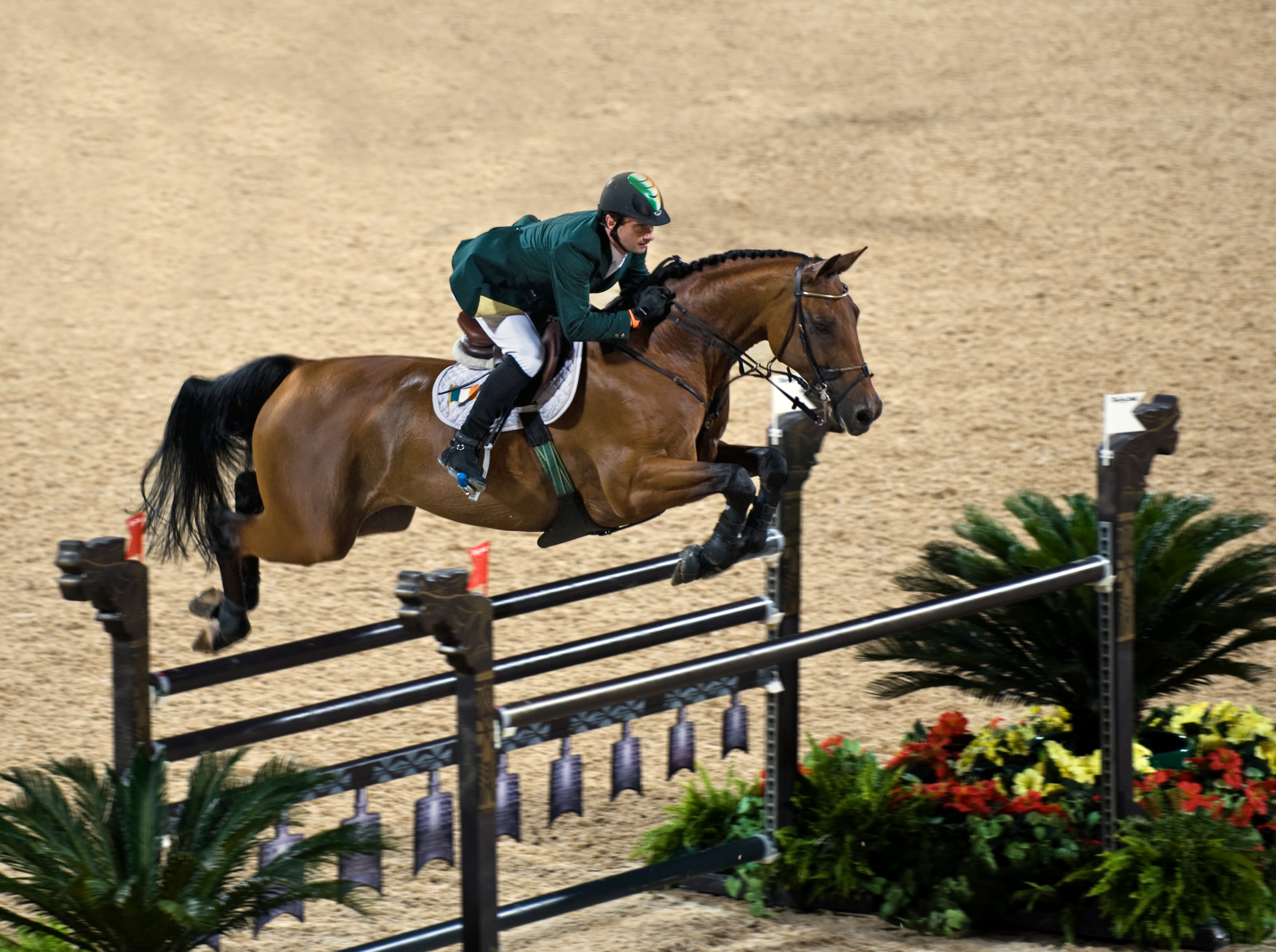
- Hanoverians, such as this gelding, are competitive mounts for the equestrian sport of show jumping.

- Hanoverian brand
- Other names: Hannoveraner; Hannoverian
- Country of origin: Germany

Traits
- Distinguishing features: Warmblood horse suitable for dressage, show jumping, eventing, show hunters, and leisure riding.

Breed standards
- Hannoveraner Verband; The American Hanoverian Society

The Hanoverian or Hannoveraner is a German breed or stud-book of warmblood sport horse. As with other German warmblood breeds, eligibility for registration depends on performance rather than ancestry.

== History ==
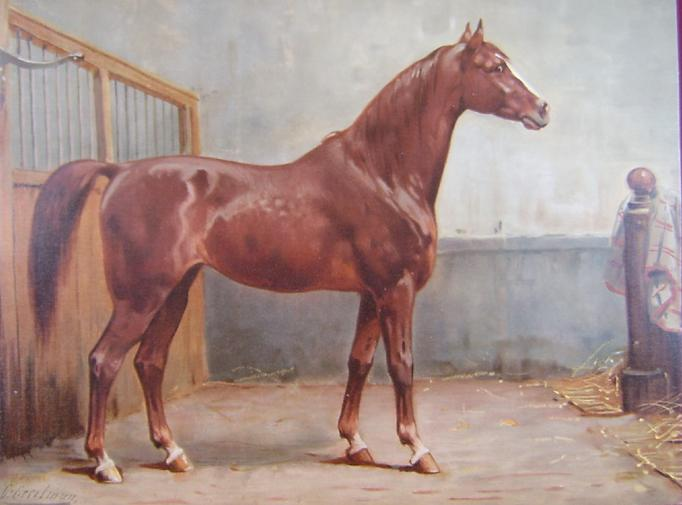
This print from 1898 depicts a sturdy, versatile Hanoverian.

In 1735, George II, the King of England and Elector of Hanover, founded the State Stud at Celle. He purchased stallions suitable for all-purpose work in agriculture and in harness, as well as for breeding cavalry mounts. The local mares were refined with Holsteiner, Thoroughbred and Cleveland Bay, Neapolitan, Andalusian, Prussian, and Mecklenburg stock. By the end of the 18th century, the Hanoverian had become a high-class coach horse.

In 1844, a law was passed that allowed only stallions approved by a commission to be used for the purpose of breeding. In 1867, breeders started a society aimed at producing a coach and military horse, with the first stud book being published in 1888. The Hanoverian became one of the most popular breeds in Europe for coach and army work.

When the demand for Hanoverians declined following World War I, the aim for breeding became a horse that could be used for farm work, but still had the blood and gaits to be used as a riding and carriage horse. After World War II, there was a growing demand for sport horses, as well as general riding horses, and the breeding yet again was adapted. Thoroughbreds were used to refine the breed; occasionally an Anglo-Arabian or Trakehner stallion was used.

== Characteristics ==
Hanoverians are elegant, strong, and robust. They are bred to be willing and trainable, and have a strong back, powerful body, athletic movement, and strong limbs. Chestnut, bay, black, and gray are found the most often. Regulations prohibit horses with too much white, and buckskin, palomino and cremello horses from being registered. There is no height requirement, but Hanoverian horses are generally 15.3–17.1 hands (63–69 inches, 160–175 cm) high.

In order to be incorporated into the studbook, stallions and mares must pass rigorous testing. The goal of this testing is to prevent horses with heritable defects from continuing to pass on their genes. As a result, horses with the Hanoverian brand often have excellent health. The Hanoverian verband, and other warmblood breeding societies, continue to promote research into the health of their horses.

Poor fertility in Hanoverian stallions and mares is not very common. However, research on Hanoverian stallions has helped lead to the identification of new genes that affect stallion fertility.

Some 7%–10% of Hanoverians have symptoms of osteochondrosis dissecans in the hock joint, and some 12%–24% in a fetlock joint.

== Use ==
Hanoverians are consistently rated high against other sport horse breeds in dressage, show jumping and eventing.

The World Breeding Federation for Sport Horses (WBFSH) uses results from FEI-recognized competitions to rank individual horses and breed registries for each discipline. In 2008, the Hanoverian stallion Weltmeyer was the world's #3 sire of WBFSH dressage horses, behind #2 Donnerhall, who was sired by the Hanoverian Donnerwetter. As of 2008, the Hanoverian Society had been consistently ranked in the top five most successful studbooks in international show jumping competition as ranked by the WBFSH and FEI since 2001. In 2008, the WBFSH ranked the Hanoverian studbook third for eventing horses, behind the Irish Sport Horse and Selle Français.

In 2016, the Hanoverian studbook took top position in the FEI/WBFSH studbook rankings for dressage.

The 2023 studbook rankings placed the Hanoverian studbook third in dressage, eighth in show jumping, and seventh in eventing.

In 2008, four Hanoverian sires were ranked in the top 10 show hunters: All the Gold (2), Rio Grande (4), Escudo I (5) and Espri (8).

Hanoverians in action

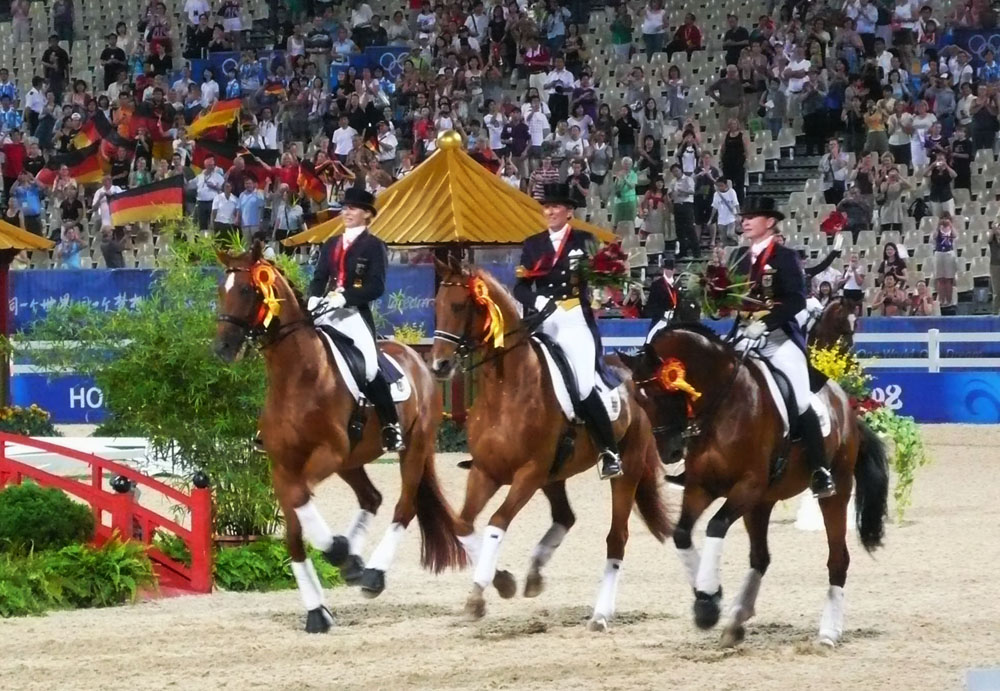
Geldings of the gold medal-winning dressage team at the 2008 Beijing Olympics

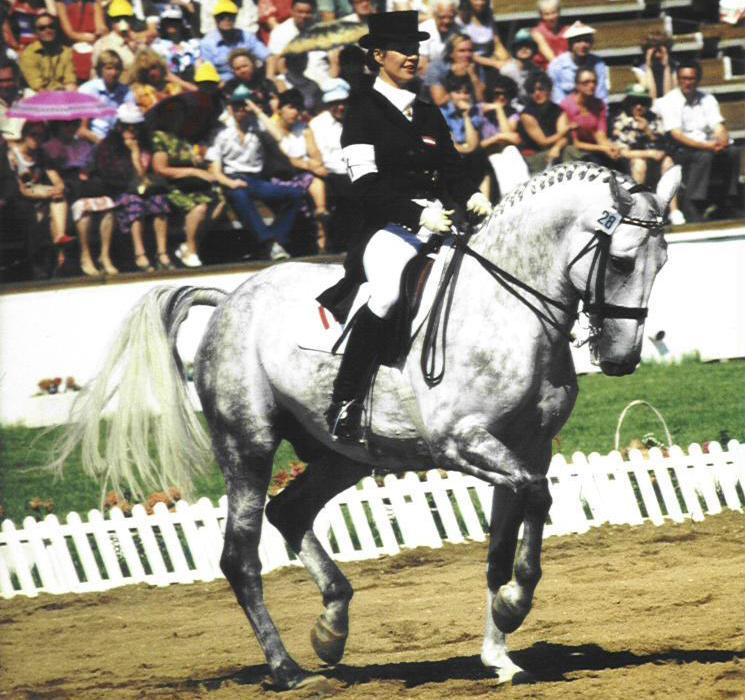
Mon Cherie during a gold-medal performance at the 1980 Olympics

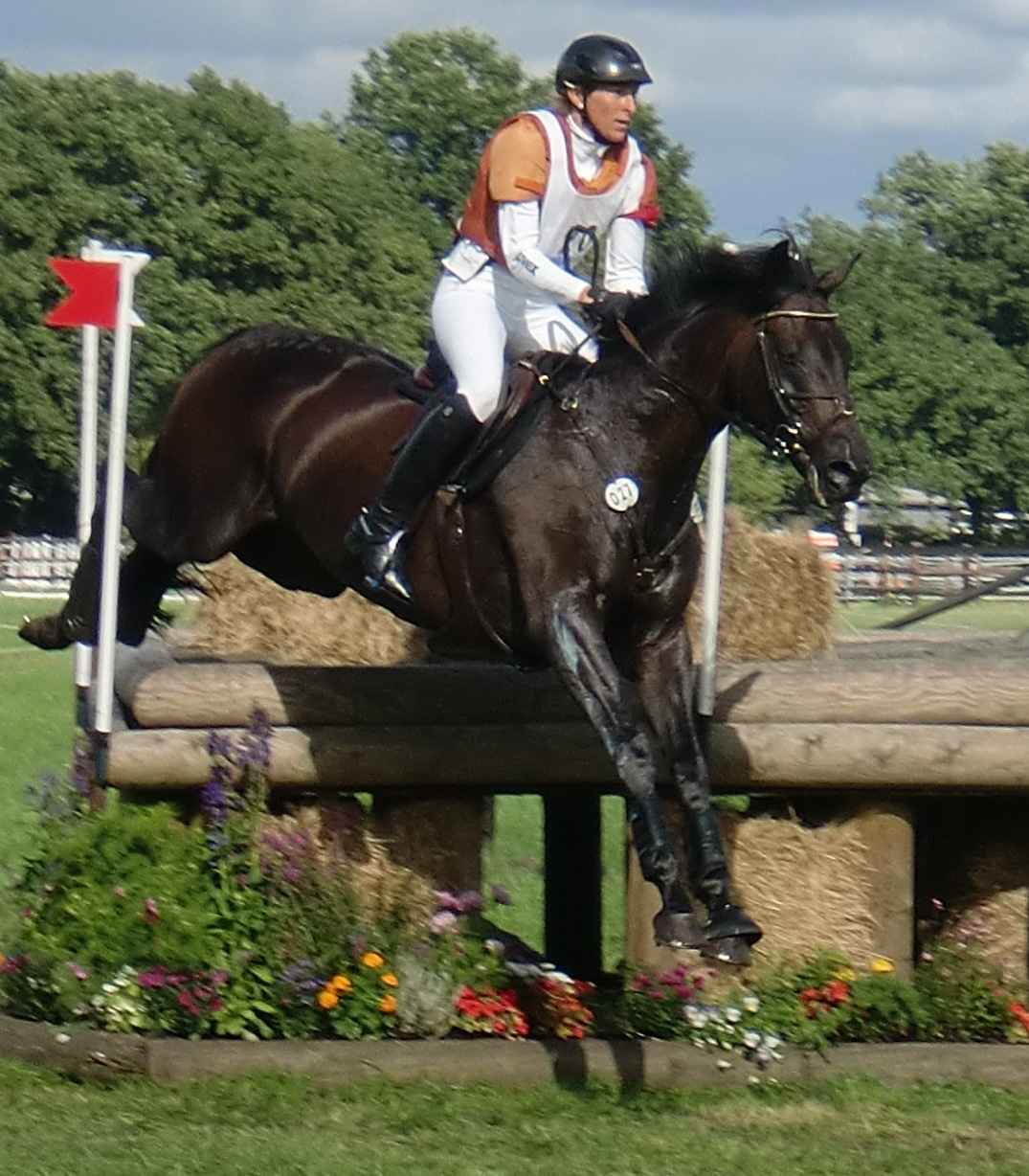
Eventing, Schenefeld 2010

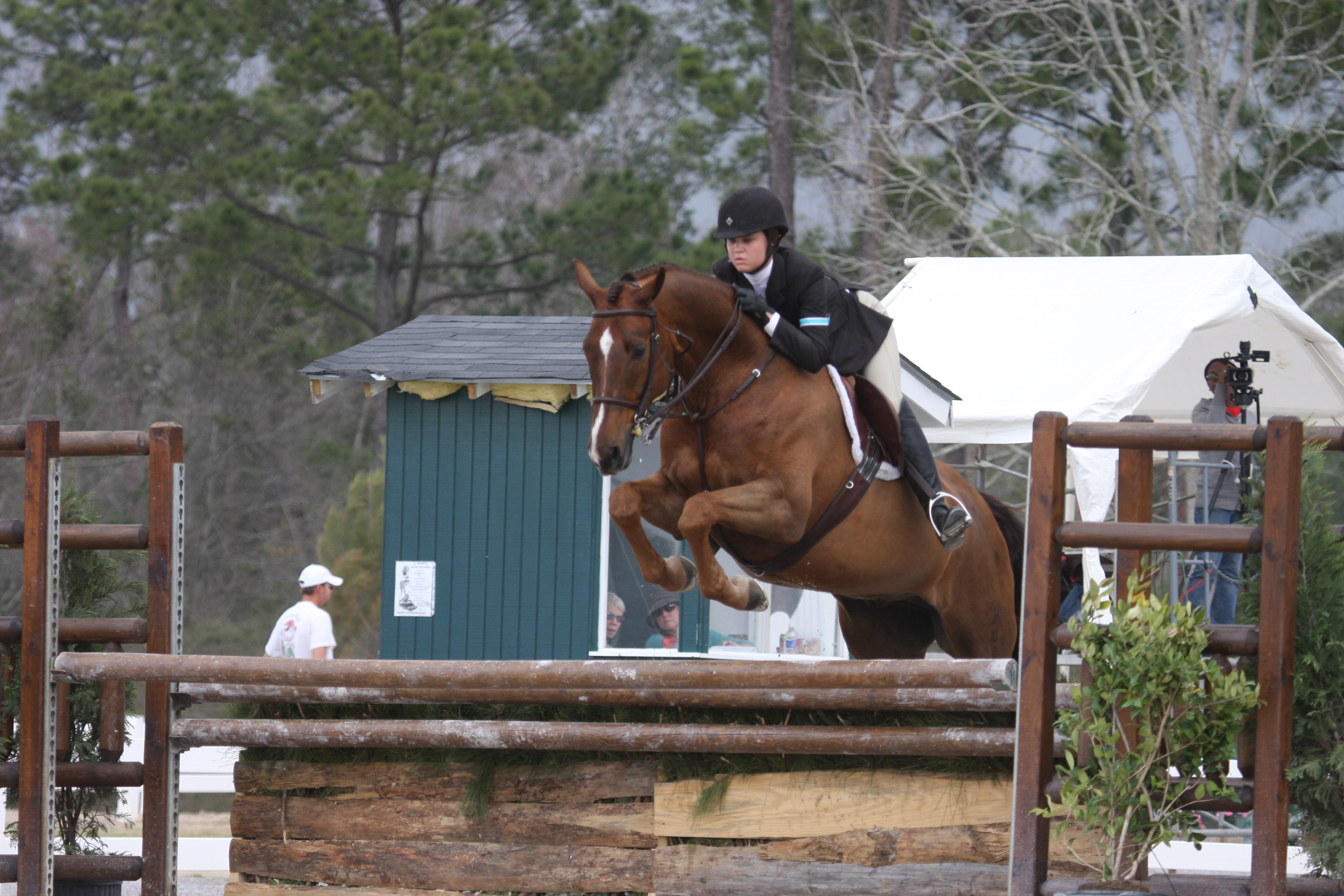
Show hunter

== Breed societies ==
The first studbook—official documentation of pedigrees, matings, and ensuing offspring—for Hanoverians was founded in 1888 by the Royal Agricultural Society. The "Hanoverian Warmblood studbook" was kept by the Chamber of Agriculture from 1899 until 1922, when the Society of Hanoverian Warmblood Breeders was founded, privatizing ownership of the studbook. This society unified over 50 local breeders' clubs with a total of over 10,000 members. Today, this society is known simply as the Hannoveraner verband, or Hanoverian Society. The verband maintains the studbooks, issues passports, and collects and publishes performance statistics, while educating members about and encouraging research into all aspects of breeding and keeping healthy Hanoverians.

The Association for the Promotion of Hanoverian horses in Equestrian Sport (Verein zur Förderung des Reitsports auf Hannoverschen Pferden) was founded in 1985 and operates under the verband. Its goal is to unite sponsors, corporate or otherwise, and talented riders with the most gifted Hanoverian horses. In this way, the FRH removes the most common obstacle to a horse's success: expense. Horses united with their riders in this fashion bear the initials FRH as a suffix or prefix, e.g. Gigolo FRH, FRH Butts Abraxxas, Forsyth FRH.

The popularity of the Hanoverian has brought about a number of affiliated societies as Hanoverian horses began to reach the Americas, Australia and New Zealand in the 1970s. The American Hanoverian Society was founded in 1978. A single society first served Australia and New Zealand in 1981; the two nations have had separate societies since 1993. There are two Hanoverian breeding clubs in Canada, in addition to groups in the United Kingdom, Denmark, Finland, France, and Russia.

== Verband activities ==
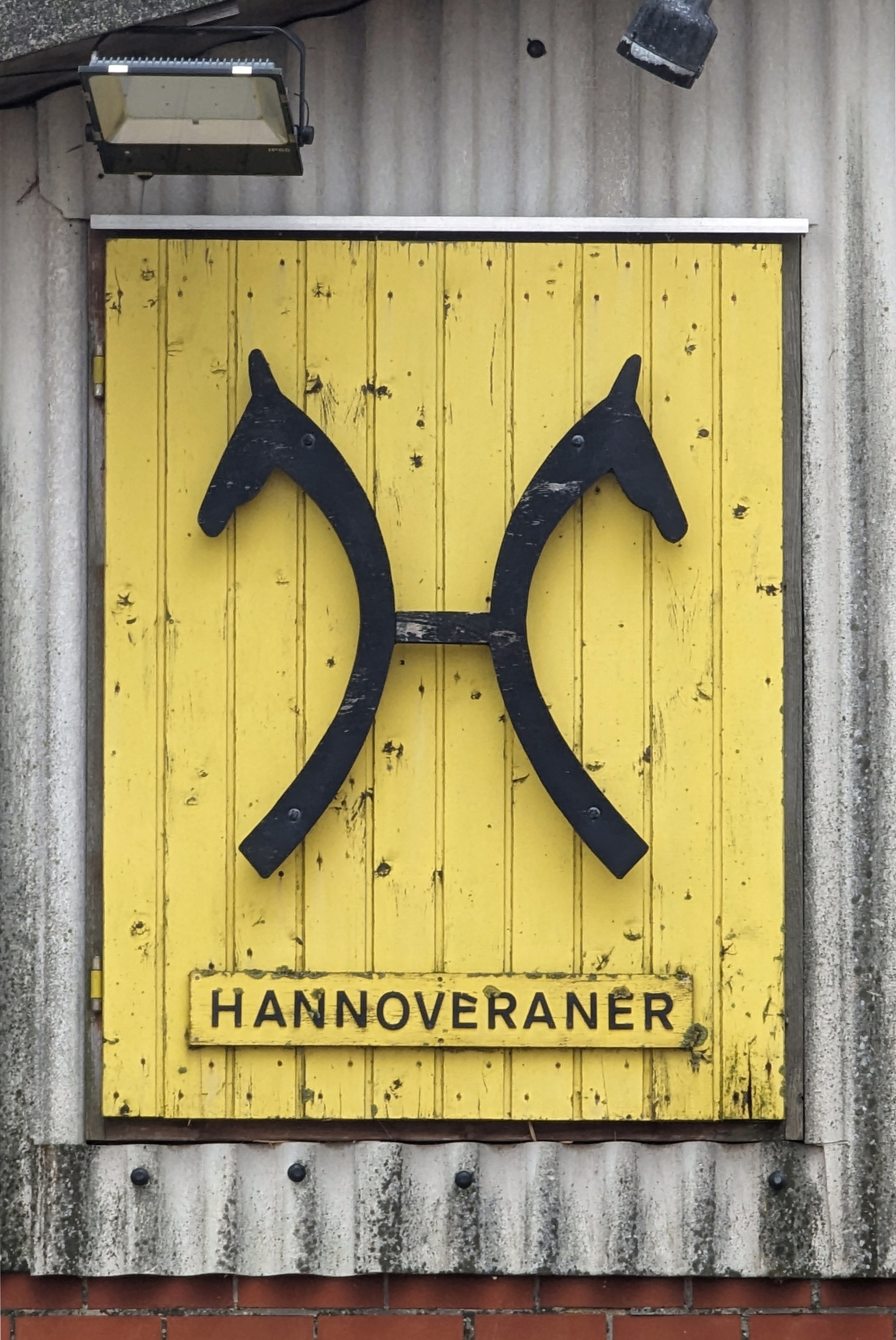
Hanoverian sign on a horse stable

The verband is responsible for many events and facilities related to the Hanoverian horse, including selection procedures for breeding stock and the famous Elite Auctions in Verden. The verband also owns the Hanoverian Riding and Driving School which trains riders, instructors, and horses.

=== Auctions ===
The auctions in Verden were first held in 1949, and have been held at the Niedersachsenhalle venue since 1972. There are at least ten auctions per year, each featuring top-quality riding horses, promising foals, proven broodmares, or licensed stallions. The most famous of these sales are the Elite Riding Horse Auctions held in April and October each year. World Cup winners such as Aramis, Mr. T and Walk on Top were Verden Elite Auction horses. Horses are delivered to the venue four weeks prior to the auction for training, promotion, and thorough screening for radiographic irregularities and vices. Price toppers routinely sell for well over €100,000 (Euros). The record price of €900,000—approximately equal to $1,125,000 at the time—was set in 2008 for the purchase of Lemony's Nicket.

=== Mare and foal shows ===
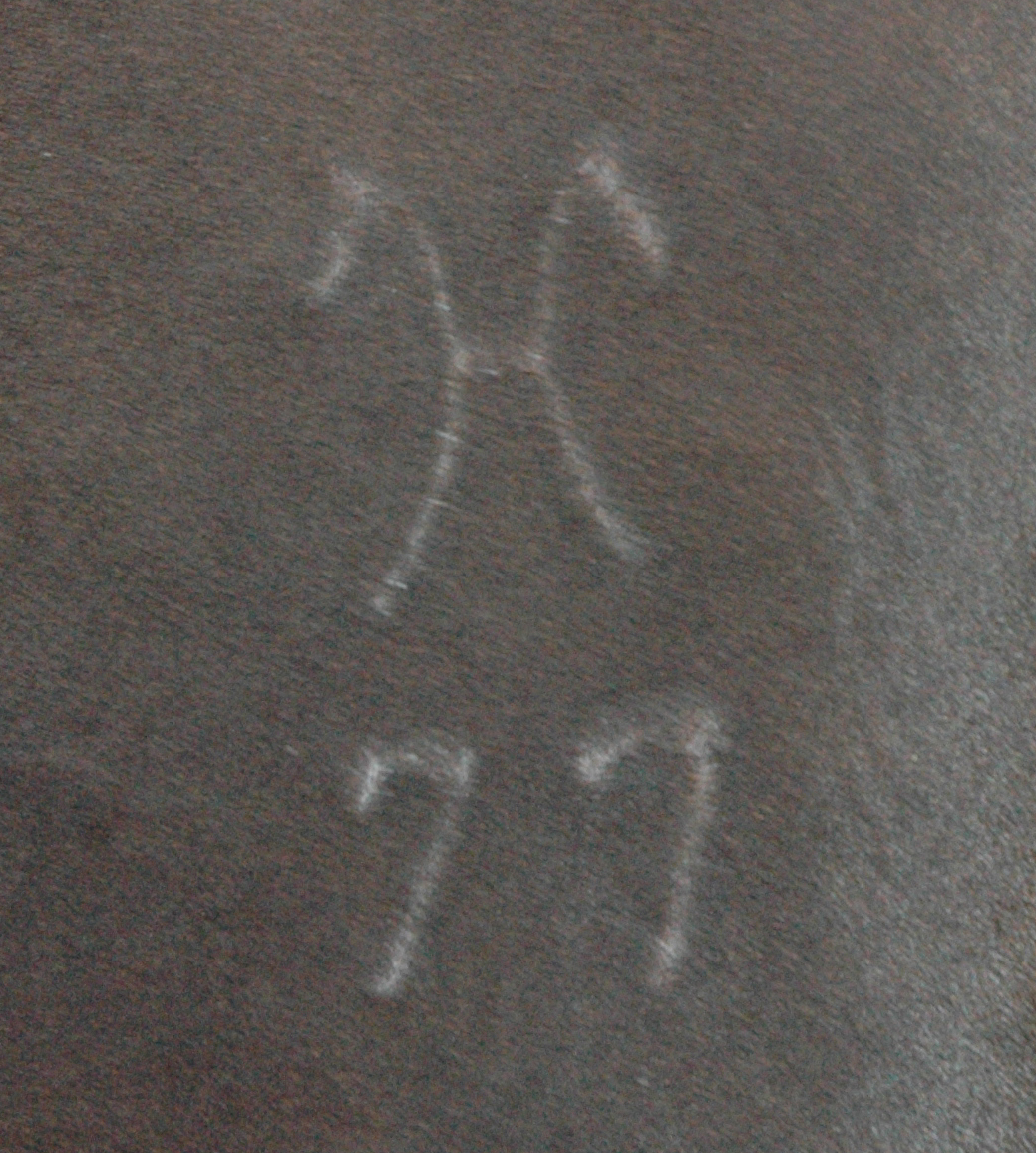
The Hanoverian brand is applied to the left hindquarter on foals accepted into the foal register. The last 2 digits of the horse's life number usually appear under the brand.

The many steps and careful evaluations of Hanoverian breeding stock are organized by the verband and district breeders' clubs (bezirkverband). The district clubs are primarily responsible for local mare and foal shows. Foals of that year are presented, usually at their dam's side, to a panel of licensed breed judges. Foals of acceptable quality are branded, their papers are signed, and they are entered into the foal registry. Judges also use this venue to recommend exceptional foals for stallion candidacy or auction participation. Mares return to the mare shows as three-year-olds to be evaluated for entry into the studbook; only such mares can have registered Hanoverian foals. The young mares are evaluated on their conformation and gaits to ensure that they are of sufficient quality. Another component of the mare shows is the field test, in which young mares are evaluated for their suitability for and age-appropriate competency in dressage and show jumping. The majority of young mares participate in the field test or station test for mares, as proof of performance is required for the mother of any stallion candidate, as well as for the State's Premium. The best mares are awarded the State's Premium (Staatspraemie), a monetary prize provided by the government of Lower Saxony aimed at keeping the finest mares in the local breeding population. Every other year, one of the seven district breeders' clubs hosts the Louis Wiegels show. The best three- and four-year-old mares from each district attend, and to win is a great honor. Alternating years with the Louis Wiegels Mare show, the verband hosts the Herwert von der Decken mare show in Verden.

=== Breeding stock selection events ===
Each year, the seven regional clubs nominate a total of 700 two-year-old colts as stallion candidates, of which only 100 attend the actual licensing (koerung) at Verden in October. A panel of verband-selected judges, experts in their fields, form the koerkommission, which evaluates each young stallion for his suitability as a sire of future Hanoverians. Through a veterinary exam, the colts must be deemed free of osteochondrosis lesions, vices, and other heritable conditions. They are then assessed on pavement to ensure that they have sound, straight, true gaits, as well as straight, sound legs. On the second day, the colts are judged on the suitability of their gaits for dressage, and their competency in jumping. On the third day, about half of the young stallions will have earned their temporary breeding license, while the other half are typically castrated and go on to become excellent riding horses. What follows the announcement of licensed stallions is the Stallion Sale, an auction which featured Hotline in 2005, who sold for a staggering €800,000.

The Hanoverian Society also organizes the Station Tests for mares. These four-week-long tests are a more in-depth evaluation of a mare's suitability for riding; in addition to her talents for dressage or show jumping, the judges can form an understanding of her character and temperament, including how easy she is to train. These tests are held at the Hanoverian Riding and Driving School in Verden and at the Hessen State Stud in Dillenburg. After young stallions have earned their temporary license, they have until they are four years old to prove themselves serviceable riding horses. The most common track is to send the stallion to a Stallion Performance Test (Hengstleistungsprüfung) at the test center in Adelheidsdorf. As an outpost of Celle State Stud, the test center, unlike the Riding and Driving School, is owned by the state. Management of the 11-month test for state-owned stallions and the 70-day test for privately owned stallions is shared between the government-owned State Stud and the privately owned Hanoverian Society.

== See also ==
- List of German horse breeds
