= World Breeding Federation for Sport Horses =

Umbrella organisation of sporthorse studbooks

The World Breeding Federation for Sport Horses (WBFSH) is an umbrella organisation of sport horse studbooks. It connects sport horse breeding organizations with the International Federation for Equestrian Sports (FEI). The FEI is the International Olympic Committee-recognized federation for Olympic equestrian sports. The WBFSH publishes official rankings of horses competing in international sport and also ranks the breeding organizations. Since 1992, the WBFSH has held the World Breeding Championships for Sport Horses, an international-level competition between the most promising young horses in the sports of dressage, show jumping, and eventing.

As of 2026, there were 87 breed organizations as members.
