= Sport horse =

Type of horse bred for equestrian events

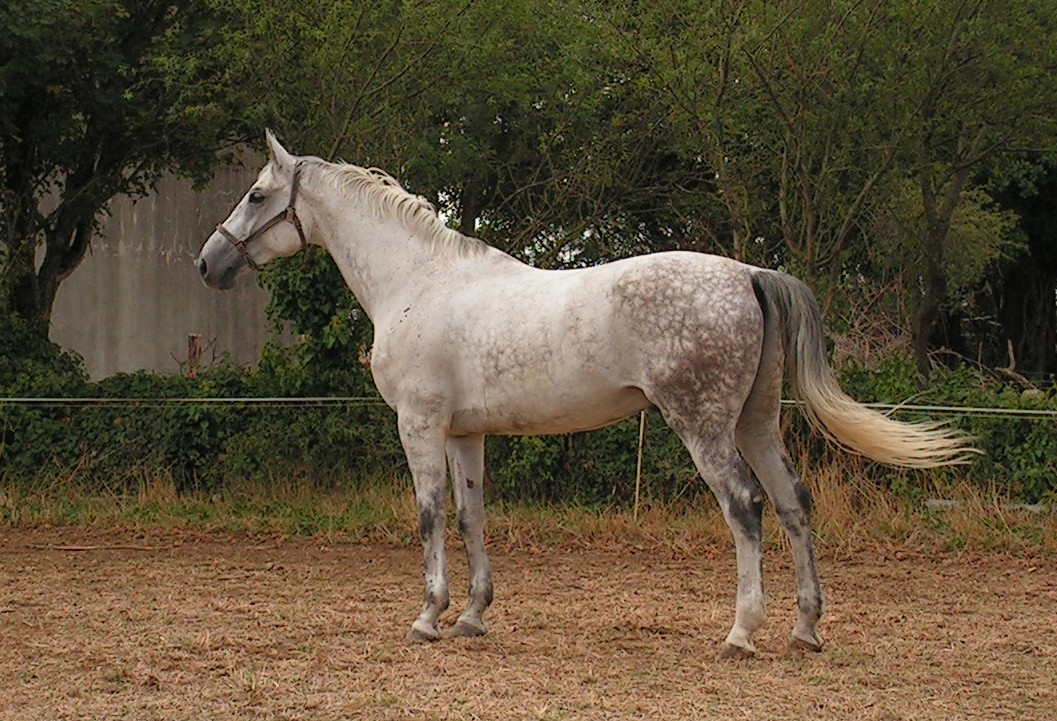
Good sport horse conformation: sloping shoulder, turned-over neck, uphill build, good musculature, and correct leg angles.

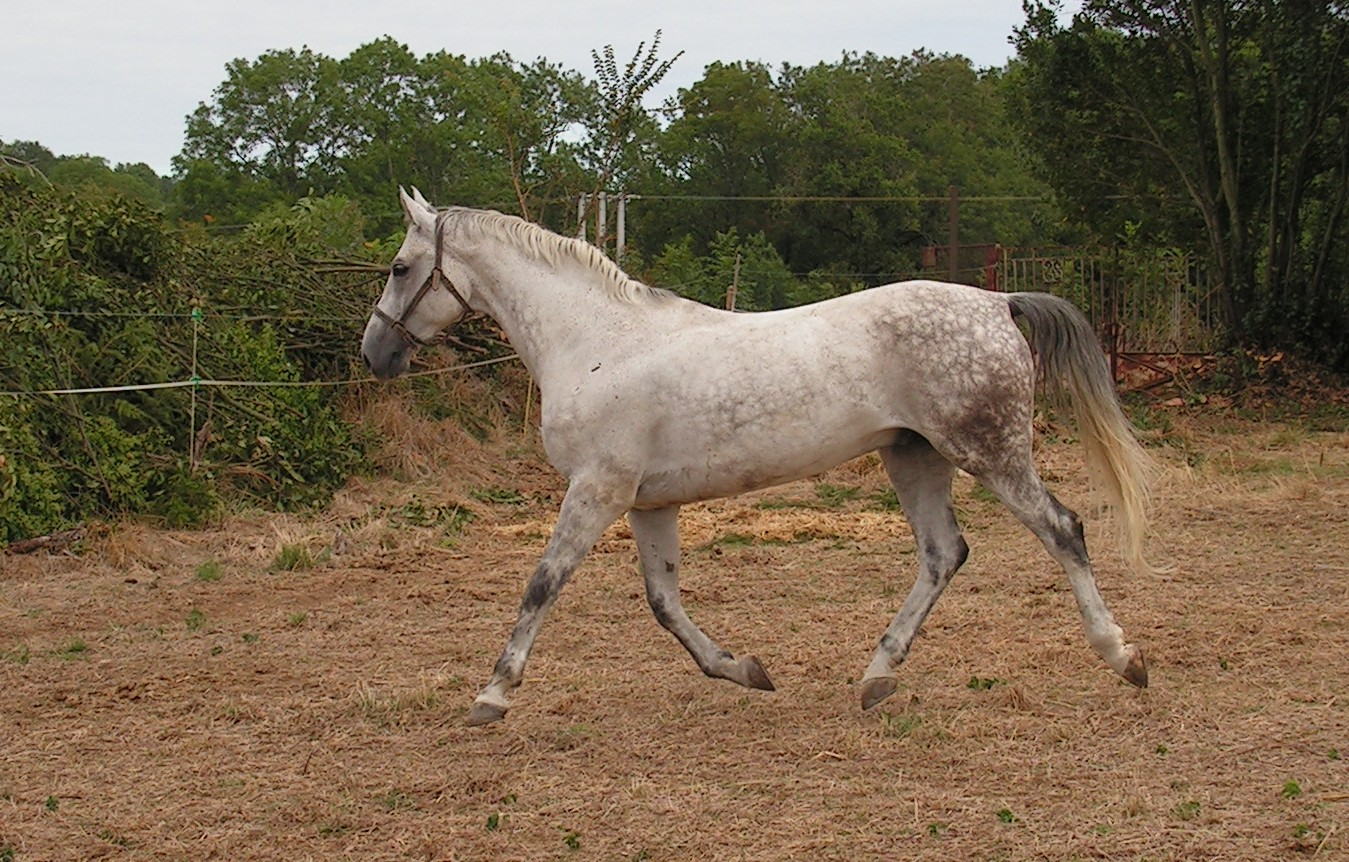
A trot showing natural suspension.

A sport horse or sporthorse is a type of horse, rather than any particular breed. The term is usually applied to horses bred for the traditional Olympic equestrian sporting events of dressage, eventing, show jumping, and combined driving, but the precise definition varies. In the United States, horses used in hunt seat and show hunter competition are often classed as sport horses, whereas the British show hunter is classified as a "show horse."

Horses used for western riding disciplines, Saddle seat, or any form of horse racing are generally not described as sport horses.

== Breeding ==
Sport horses are bred for specific qualities in their conformation, movement, and temperament. The purpose and breeding of sport horses across the world varies little, but the exact definition of a "sport horse" differs slightly from country to country. In the United Kingdom, the term "sport horse" refers to any horse suitable for dressage, eventing or show jumping. In the US, the definition is broader, sometimes encompassing horses used in any of the hunt seat disciplines.

Worldwide, the breeding of sport horses is overseen by the World Breeding Federation for Sport Horses. The WBFSH acts as a connection between sport horse breeding organizations and the International Federation for Equestrian Sports (FEI).

Characteristics common to quality sport horses include the following:

- Conformation: most sport horses have similarities in their conformation. These include a sloping shoulder, a well-shaped neck, and an uphill build. Conformation has direct effects on the animal's movement and jumping ability.
- Movement: although movement may vary between disciplines, most sport horses are bred for a long, athletic stride and movement that uses the whole body. The trot and canter should have good suspension, and the horse naturally reaches under his body with his hind legs. This movement makes it easier for the rider to teach the horse to engage, collect, and extend his stride, which are necessary qualities in all sport horse disciplines.
- Jumping ability: horses bred for the jumping disciplines also possess good jumping form, with tight lower legs and good bascule. They are also bred to have conformation that allows them to jump higher.
- Temperament: because of the great deal of training needed to produce a successful sport horse, they are generally bred for trainability and willingness to work. Horses intended for Olympic-level may be bred a bit "hotter", which can be controlled by their experienced riders and used to their advantage, while those intended for amateur use are generally bred to be quieter and more forgiving.

== Breeds ==
Many Warmblood breeds were specifically developed for use as sport horses, particularly for use in dressage and show jumping. Thoroughbreds are also commonly used as sport horses, particularly in eventing, and some have been bred specifically as sport horses, rather than as race horses. Such Thoroughbreds tend to have a heavier sport horse build, rather than the leaner conformation of a race horse. However, there have also been many instances of former race horses being retrained as successful sport horses. Thoroughbreds are often crossed with warmbloods and draft horses to create sport horses, and such crosses were also the historic foundation of most warmblood breeds. One example is the Irish Sport Horse, a cross between the Thoroughbred and Irish Draught breeds.

== See also ==
- Warmblood
- Equestrian at the Summer Olympics
- Polish sport horse
- Canadian sport horse
