= List of Swiss horse breeds =

This is a list of the Swiss breeds of horse, with various names used for them in that country:

International name	French	German	Italian	Notes	Image
	Ajoie			extinct, merged into the Swiss Warmblood in the 1970s	
		Burgdorfer		coldblood, from cross-breeding of Jura and Ardennes, became extinct in the twentieth century	
		Einsiedler; Einsiedeln	Cavallo della Madonna	warmblood, considered extinct since the mid-twentieth century; contributed to the development of the Swiss Warmblood, which is sometimes known as the New Einsiedeln; a small number remain	
		Entlebucher		light coldblood, became extinct in the twentieth century	
Erlenbach		Erlenbacher		derived from Danish mares and Mecklenburger stallions, original form lost by the mid-eighteenth century; warmblood, became extinct in the twentieth century, merged into the Swiss Warmblood	
	Franches-Montagnes; Franc-Montagnard; Cheval du Jura; Jura	Freiberger			
	Ormont			extinct	
		Schwyz		extinct	
Swiss Halfblood				extinct, merged into the Swiss Warmblood in the mid-twentieth century	
Swiss Warmblood; Swiss Saddle Horse	Demi-Sang CH; Demi-sang Suisse	Schweizer Warmblut; CH-Warmblut; Neue Einsiedler	Cavallo della Svizzera	formed in the early 1970s through merger of the Ajoie, Einsiedler and Erlenbach local breeds and the Swiss Halfblood; sometimes known as 'Neue Einsiedeln'.	

== Other extinct breeds ==
ProSpecieRara lists several other extinct Swiss breeds of horse:

- Bündner Oberländer Pferd
- Charrat-Pferd
- Delsberger Pferd
- Emmentaler Pferd
- Freiburger (Wifflisburger)
- Luzerner Pferd
- Mayenfelder Pferd
- Pruntruter Pferd
- Seeländer Pferd
- Simmentaler Pferd
- Solothurner Pferd
- St.Galler Oberländer Pferd
- St.Galler Rheintal Pferd
