= Swiss Warmblood =

Swiss breed of horse

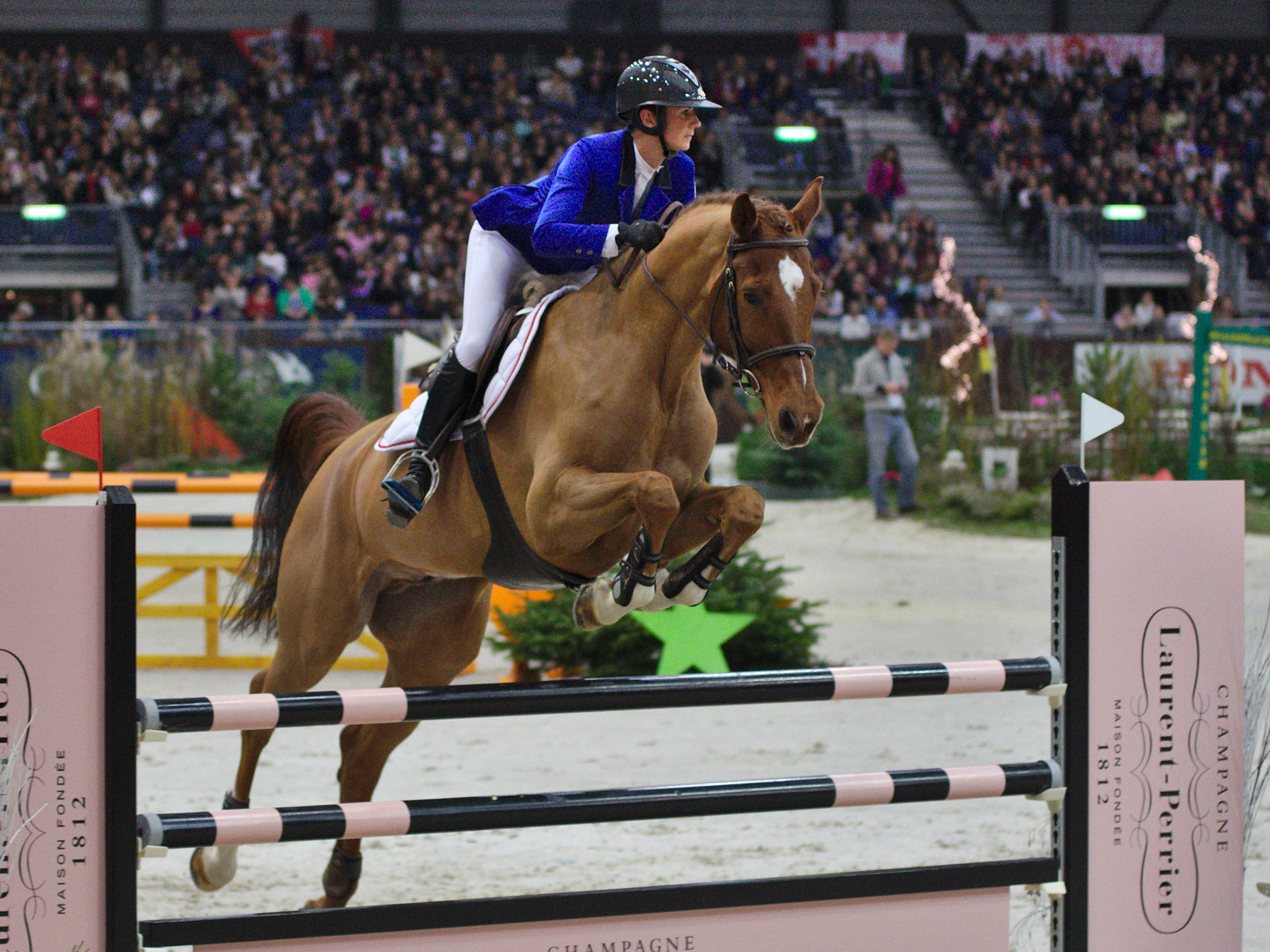
- Pénélope Leprevost on Cayman Athletic at the Concours hippique international de Genève in 2014
- Conservation status: FAO (2007): not at risk; DAD-IS (2023): at risk/endangered
- Other names: Swiss Saddle Horse; CH-Warmblut; Schweizer Warmblut; Neue Einsiedler; Demi-Sang CH; Demi-Sang Suisse; Cavallo della Svizzera
- Country of origin: Switzerland
- Use: jumping; dressage; driving

Traits
- Weight: Male: average 600 kg; Female: average 500 kg
- Height: Male: average 168 cm; Female: average 162 cm
- Colour: usually chestnut, less often bay; black and other colours also occur

The Swiss Warmblood or Schweizer Warmblut is a modern Swiss breed of warmblood sport horse. It was created in the mid-twentieth century by merger of the Einsiedler – which had been bred for centuries at the Benedictine Monastery of Einsiedeln in the Canton of Schwyz – with the Swiss Halfblood and with traditional local breeds including the Ajoie, the Erlenbacher and the Entlebucher. It is sometimes known as the Neue Einsiedler. The Swiss Warmblood is bred at the Swiss National Stud Farm at Avenches, in the Canton of Vaud.

== History ==
The Swiss Warmblood was created in the mid-twentieth century by merger of the Einsiedler – which had been bred for centuries at the Benedictine Monastery of Einsiedeln in the Canton of Schwyz – with the Swiss Halfblood and with traditional local breeds including the Ajoie, the Erlenbacher and the Entlebucher. Those individual breeds effectively ceased to exist and are now listed as extinct. A stud-book was started in 1950. In the 1960s use was made of a number of foreign stallions, among them three Anglo-Normans named Ivoire, Orinate de Messil and Que d'Espair, the Holsteiners Astral and Chevalier, and a Swedish Warmblood called Aladin; thereafter the stallions used were mostly Swiss.

From 2010 to 2012 the number of annual registrations in the stud-book was approximately 750. In 2017 the total population was estimated at 9000–10000, with 750 breeding mares and 77 stallions. In 2023 the conservation status of the breed was listed in the DAD-IS database of the FAO as 'at risk/endangered'.

== Characteristics ==
The Swiss Warmblood is usually chestnut, less often bay; black and other colours may also occur. Heights are usually in the range 155–164 cm.

== Uses ==
The Swiss Warmblood was bred as a sport horse. It is usually trained for show-jumping or for dressage; it may also be driven in harness.
