= Swiss National Stud Farm =

Institution for horse breeding and research

- Haras national suisse (French); Schweizer Nationalgestüt (German)
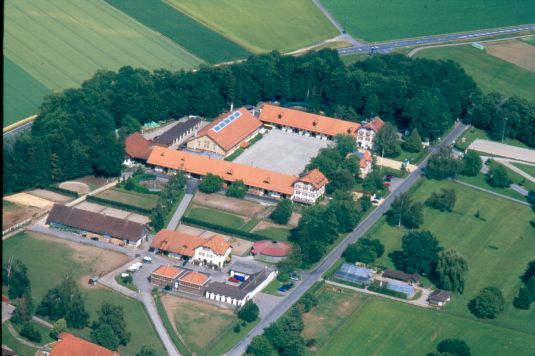
- Formation: 1899
- Type: Government institution
- Purpose: Conservation and improvement of Swiss horse breeds, equine research, and training
- Location: Avenches, Canton of Vaud, Switzerland
- Coordinates: 46°53′12″N 7°01′03″E
- Parent organization: Agroscope, Federal Office for Agriculture
- Website: www.harasnational.ch

The Swiss National Stud Farm (French: Haras national suisse (HNS), German: Schweizer Nationalgestüt (SNG)) is an institution dedicated to the conservation and improvement of Swiss horse breeds, established in 1899. It serves as a center of expertise for equine breeding and management in rural environments. Since January 2000, the stud farm has operated under a mandate from the Swiss Federal Council with a designated budget. It is part of Agroscope, which operates under the Federal Office for Agriculture (FOAG), within the Federal Department of Economic Affairs, Education and Research (EAER). The Swiss National Stud Farm is located in Avenches, Canton of Vaud.

== History ==
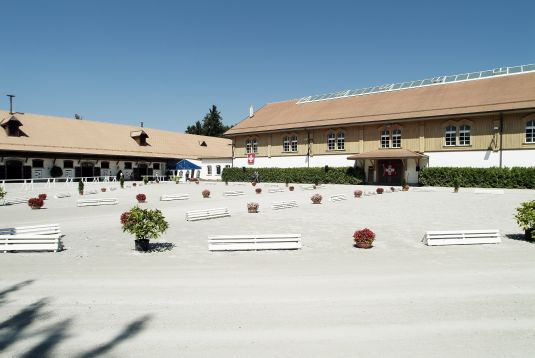
The courtyard

In the latter half of the 19th century, the Swiss Confederation implemented measures to promote horse breeding by establishing a stallion depot in Thun (Canton of Bern). This facility quickly became insufficient, leading to the 1898 decision to create a new stallion depot in Avenches. Approximately 150 hectares of land were acquired from 173 owners.

The new stud farm, initially named the Federal Stallion and Foal Depot, welcomed its first horses in 1901. Until 1927, it housed only stallions, workhorses, and male foals raised as stud prospects. In 1927, the depot acquired ten Franches-Montagnes broodmares, becoming the Federal Stud Farm. Under successive directors, the stud farm underwent architectural expansions, including a new mare facility in 1939, a veterinary clinic in 1959, and a reproduction center by the late 20th century. In 1942, it expanded further with the acquisition of an agricultural estate in the Jura region.

In 1997, part of the stud farm was privatized, leading to the creation of the Avenches National Equestrian Institute (IENA), a multidisciplinary equestrian center. The Swiss National Stud Farm remained a federally funded institution but was restructured. While the number of stallions remained stable, the broodmare herd was phased out. The stud farm shifted focus to core activities such as training, applied research, and maintaining high-quality stallions.

== Mission ==
The Swiss National Stud Farm supports sustainable equine agricultural production across Switzerland, aligning with national agricultural policy goals while prioritizing competitiveness and the species' natural needs. It serves as a center of expertise, providing producers, breeding organizations, and stakeholders with infrastructure, breeding stock, expertise, and knowledge to address current and future challenges. The stud farm has three primary missions: training, research, and promotion and support of the Franches-Montagnes breed. The stud farm also supplies donkeys for the Saint Nicholas Day procession in Fribourg, Switzerland.

The operations and responsibilities of the Swiss National Stud Farm are governed by the following federal laws and ordinances:

- Loi fédérale sur l'agriculture (LAgr) [Federal Law on Agriculture] (federal law 910.1, 141, 147).
- Ordonnance sur l'élevage [Ordinance on Breeding] (ordinance 916.310, 14).
- Ordonnance sur les émoluments perçus par l'Office fédéral de l'agriculture (OEmol OFAG) [Ordinance on Fees Collected by the Federal Office for Agriculture] (ordinance 910.11).

== Preservation of the Franches-Montagnes breed ==
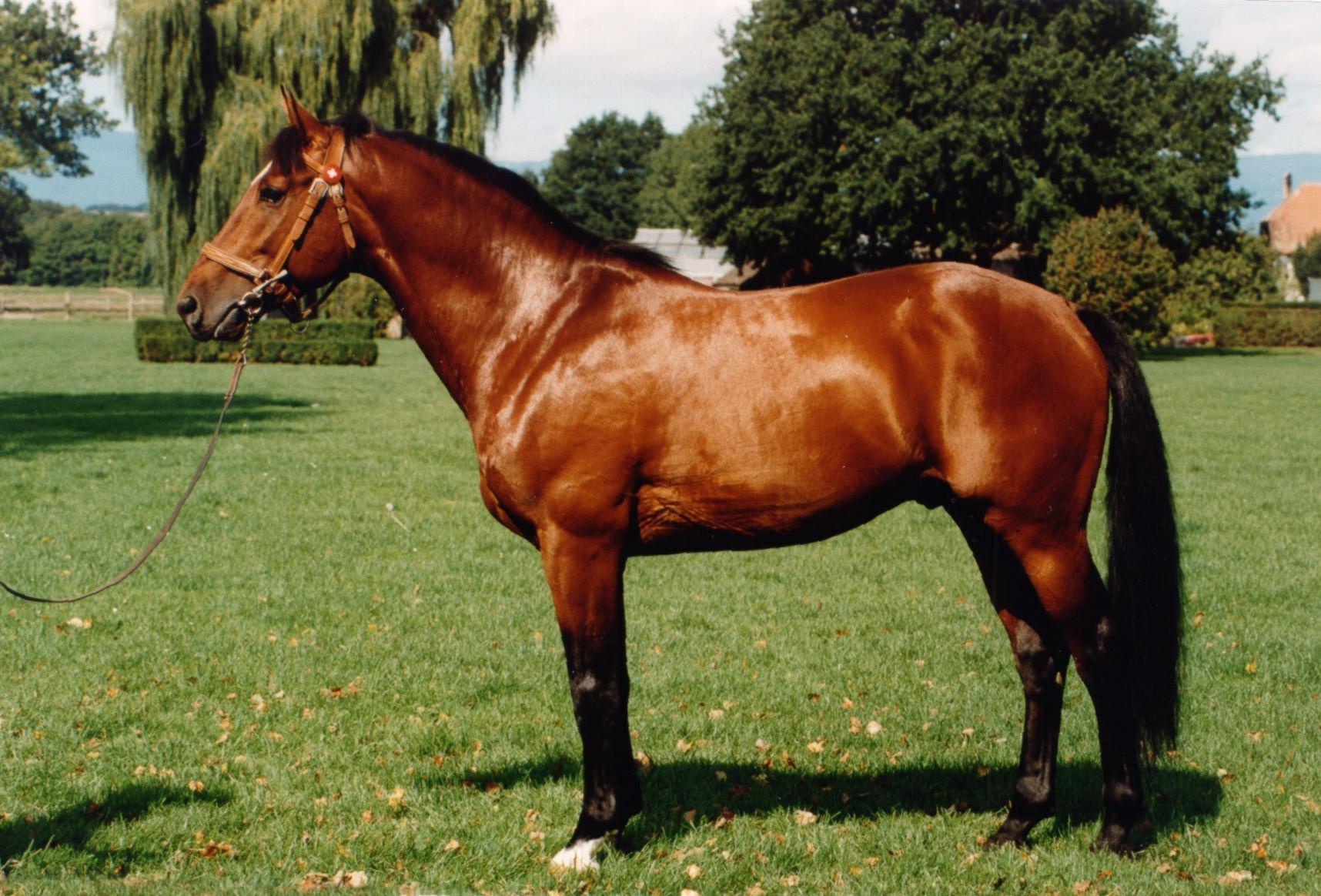
Nepal, one of the Franches-Montagnes breeding stallions at the stud

The Swiss National Stud Farm places special emphasis on the Freiberger, or Franches-Montagnes, horse breed, Switzerland's only remaining native horse breed, as other breeds have gradually disappeared. As the last light draft horse in Western Europe, the Franches-Montagnes is versatile, excelling in recreational riding, driving, agricultural and forestry work, and hippotherapy.

The stud farm maintains approximately 60 stallions and a semen bank representing all bloodlines, ensuring the breed's survival and genetic diversity. By showcasing the breed at national and international events in disciplines like driving and classical riding, the stud farm enhances its visibility and supports its development and commercialization.

== Training and education ==
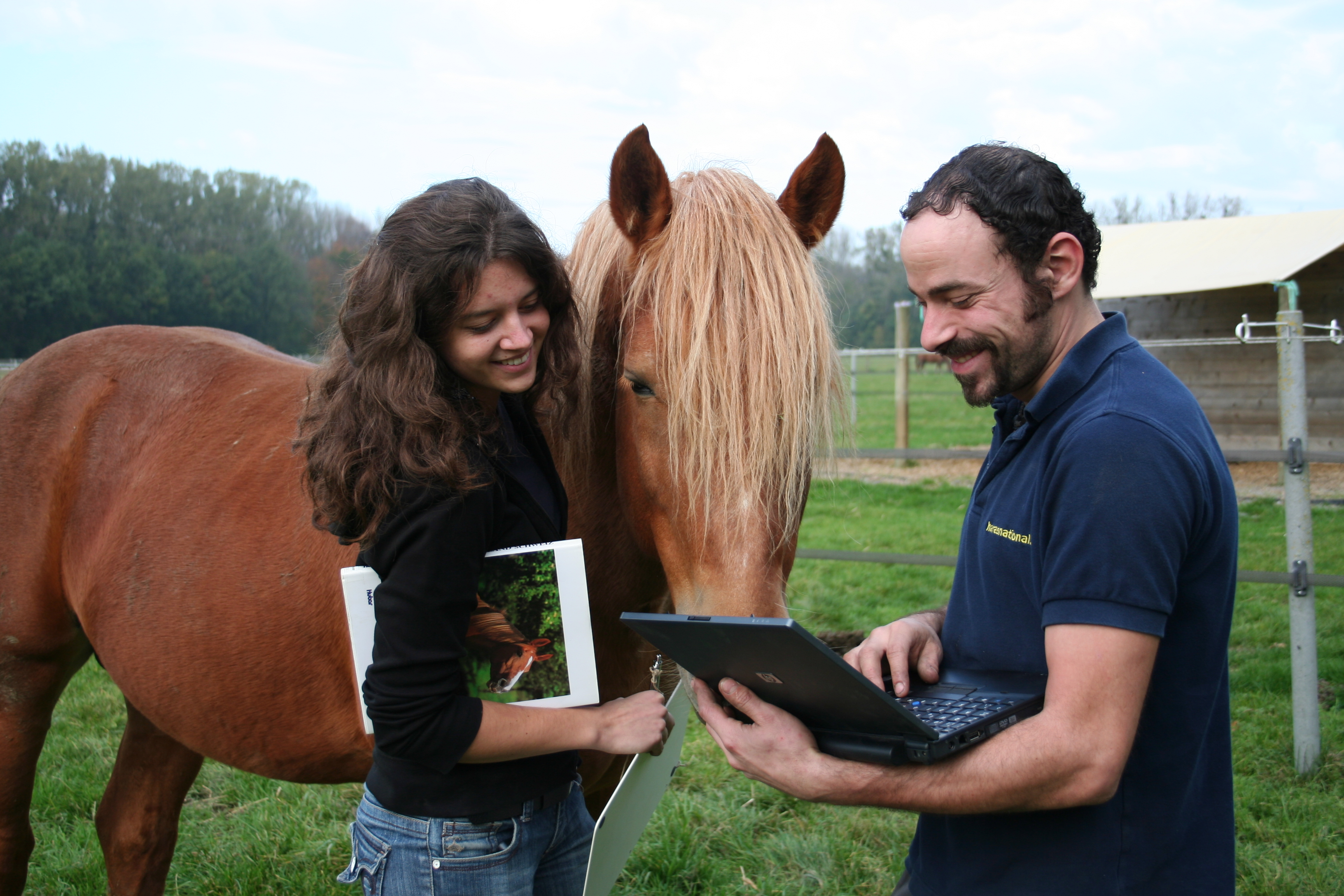
Training a student

With Switzerland's equine population steadily increasing, many horse owners lack the expertise for species-appropriate care. The Swiss National Stud Farm addresses this by offering its expertise and infrastructure to breeders and owners, ensuring high-quality services. The stud farm offers training for young horses in driving and riding, as well as preparation and presentation of young stallions for breeding evaluations. A customized training plan is developed with the owner, who may observe sessions. A training contract outlines the process.

The Swiss National Stud Farm provides expertise to horse breeders and owners through a wide range of practical and theoretical courses. These are delivered by in-house specialists (veterinarians, agronomists, ethologists, historians, riders, farriers, and artisans) and external experts for specialized topics, such as horse training programs. The stud farm offers access to extensive resources through its Horse Advisory Office and the Horse Documentation Center, serving specialists, students, and enthusiasts.

The stud farm offers continuing education courses in veterinary care, horse breeding, horse management, equine nutrition, driving, and farriery. Offerings range from introductory courses to comprehensive programs like Equigarde, a 22-day course covering breeding and horse care through theoretical lessons, practical exercises, demonstrations, and field trips. The stud farm partners with the Swiss University of Agronomy (HESA) for Bachelor of Science in Agronomy (equine specialization) and Equigarde Plus, a continuing education certificate for equine professionals.

As a public institution, the Swiss National Stud Farm supports youth training by offering apprenticeships and internships in roles such as rider, horse keeper, farrier, saddler, commercial employee, and veterinary assistant.

Established in 2000, the advisory office provides neutral, expert responses to inquiries from individuals and institutions. It offers guidance on breeding (genetics, mating, selection), management (behavior, legal requirements, housing systems, paddocks, pastures), nutrition, hygiene, diseases, accidents, fertility, reproduction methods, hoof care, broodmares, stallions, young horses, boarding, business economics, legal issues, insurance, and training for horses, riders, and drivers.

The documentation center provides access to a vast collection of documents and publications on equine management and breeding, including historical records, specialized literature, and image archives in print and digital formats. It plays a key role in knowledge transfer and improving horse welfare.

The stud farm's forge specializes in farriery, repair and restoration of driving carriages, wheel rimming, and metal construction for stables. It trains two to three farrier apprentices at a time. The carpentry workshop, led by a wheelwright, handles wooden constructions and wheel manufacturing. The saddlery, managed by a master saddler, produces and restores leather goods and offers saddler apprenticeships. Infrastructure maintenance and transportation are supported by a dedicated team of specialists.

== Veterinary research ==
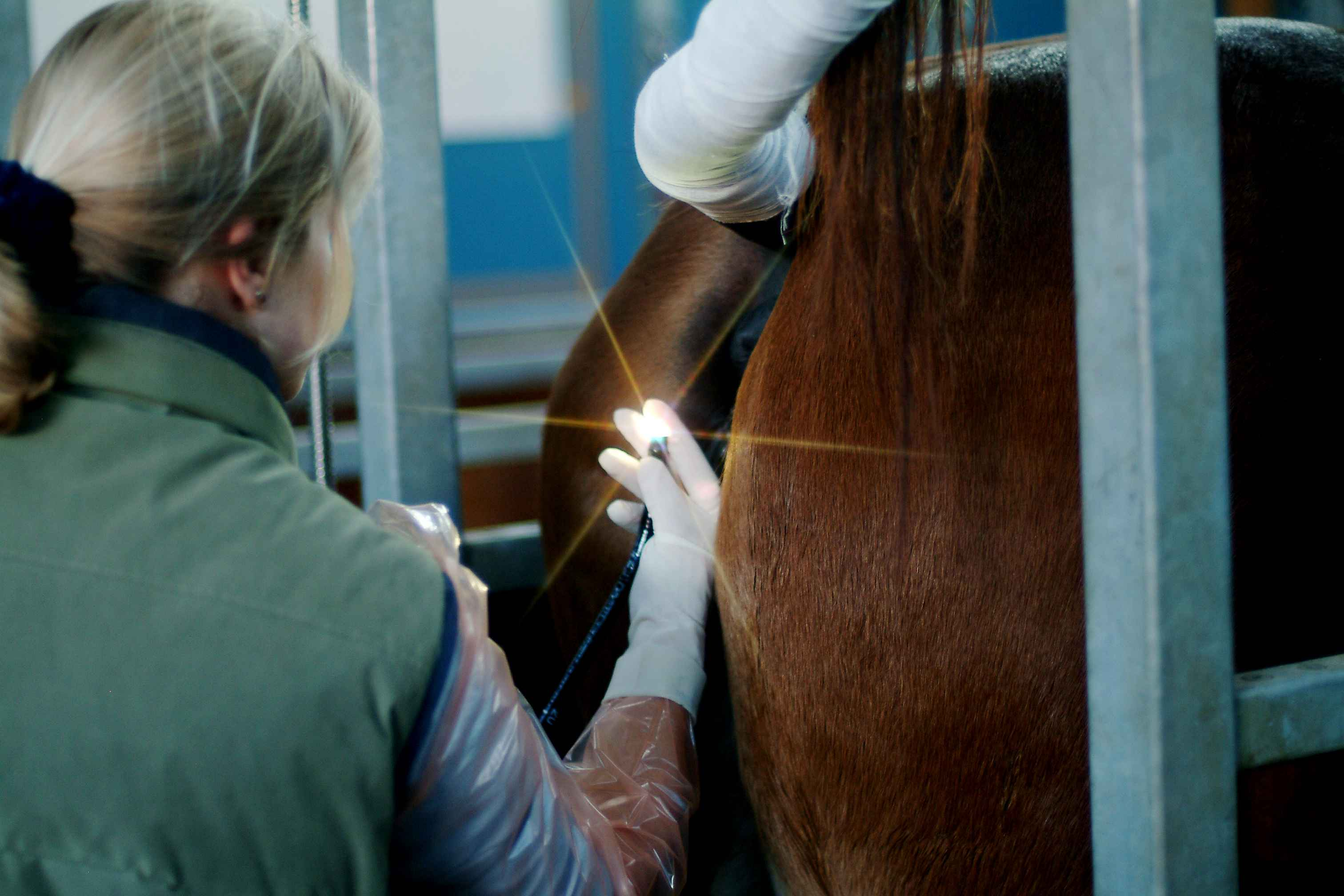
Artificial insemination of a mare

The Swiss National Stud Farm conducts applied research to enhance horse behavior, health, and fertility. Studies focus on genetics, infectious and hereditary diseases, animal husbandry, and advancements in natural breeding, insemination, and embryo transfer techniques. Research is conducted in collaboration with veterinary faculties, universities, and equine breeding organizations. Findings are applied at the stud farm and disseminated through publications and courses.

The veterinary service oversees the health of horses at the Avenches site and conducts research in health, behavior, and genetics. Findings are applied practically and shared with horse owners. The veterinary team also contributes to the training and professional development for equine professionals.

The reproduction center conducts research on equine fertility, applying findings to provide services to mare and stallion owners, particularly in fertility-related areas.

== Bibliography ==
- Poncet, Pierre-André (2009). Le Cheval des Franches-Montagnes à travers l'histoire [The Franches-Montagnes Horse Through History] (in French). Société jurassienne d'émulation. ISBN 978-2-940070-92-3.
