= Franches-Montagnes =

Franches-Montagnes may refer to:

- Franches-Montagnes District, one of the three districts of the canton of Jura, Switzerland
- Franches-Montagnes, a horse breed, also known as a Freiberger
