= Simone de Montmollin =

Swiss politician

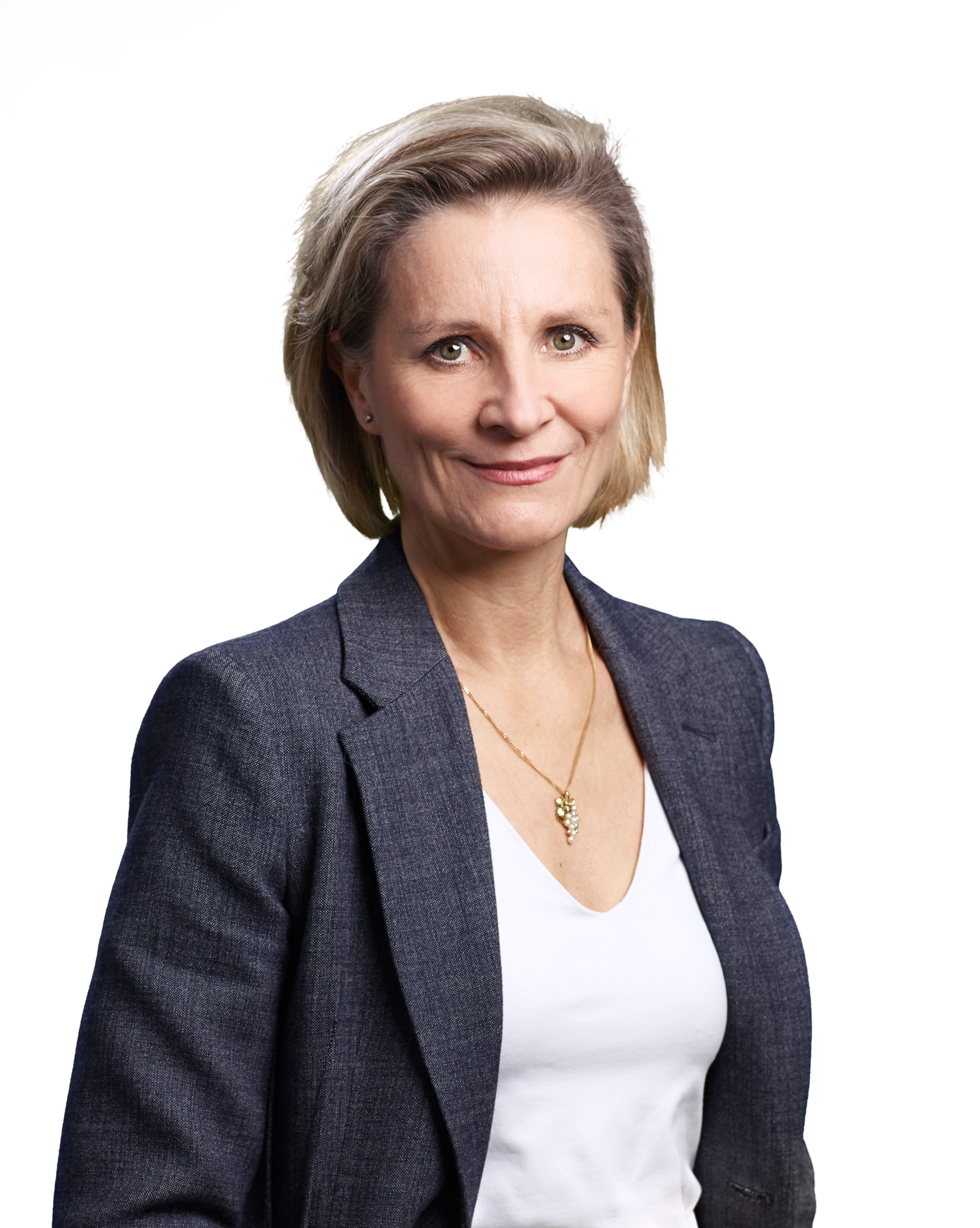
- de Montmollin in 2023.

Member of the National Council
- Incumbent
- Assumed office 2 December 2019

Member of the Grand Council of Geneva
- In office November 2013 – November 2019
- Succeeded by: Jacques Apothéloz

Member of the Constituent Assembly of Geneva
- In office 19 October 2008 – 31 May 2012

Personal details
- Born: Simone Götz; 20 July 1968 (age 58) Lausanne, Vaud, Switzerland
- Party: FDP.The Liberals
- Spouse: Alexandre de Montmollin
- Children: 2
- Education: École d'ingénieurs de Changins
- Occupation: politician, oenologist
- Website: simonedemontmollin.ch

Simone de Montmollin (née Götz; born 20 July 1968 in Lausanne) is a Swiss politician, businesswoman, and oenologist. She began her career in the medical field, working for the European Society of Cardiology before founding her own medical communications company, Götz & Cie Cardio Diffusion, in 1991. De Montmollin left the medical field to become an oenologist, and served as the director of the Swiss Union of Oenologists, worked as a communications specialist at Agroscope, and served as chairwoman for the 42nd World Congress of Vine and Wine in Geneva. In 2008 she was elected, as an Independent, to the Geneva Constituent Assembly. She later joined FDP.The Liberals and was elected to the Grand Council of Geneva, serving from 2013 to 2018. In her last year on the council, she was the president of the Committee for Environment, Agriculture, and Management. In 2019, de Montmollin was elected to the National Council, where she is a member of the Committee for Science, Education and Culture and the Delegation for Relations with the French Parliament.

== Early life and family ==
De Montmollin was born Simone Götz in Lausanne on 20 July 1968. Her father was from Neustadt an der Weinstraße in Germany and moved to Switzerland in the 1950s. De Montmollin's grandfather, a German soldier, was killed on the Eastern Front during World War II. Her mother, who is Swiss, is from Sigriswil. She is the youngest of four children and grew up in Mies. Her father died when she was twelve.

== Career ==
=== Medical field and oenology ===
De Montmollin started an apprenticeship at a pharmacy when she was 16 years old. She studied business management and management in the medical field in Lausanne. Upon completing her studies, she lived in England before finding employment with the European Society of Cardiology. In 1991, she founded a medical communication company called Götz & Cie Cardio Diffusion, which she managed until 1996. In 2001, she graduated with an oenology degree from the École d'ingénieurs de Changins. In 2003, she was appointed as chief of the editorial staff at Objectif, the Changins Alumni Journal. From 2003 to 2019, de Montmollin was the director of the Swiss Union of Oenologists and worked as a communications specialist at Agroscope from 2014 to 2017. In 2019, she was the chairwoman of the organizing committee for the 42nd World Congress of Vine and Wine in Geneva. As a freelance oenologist, de Montmollin works with private and public Swiss and international organizations on viniculture projects.

=== Politics ===
In 2008, de Montmollin was elected as an Independent to the Geneva Constituent Assembly, where she worked on introducing a constitutional article on agriculture.

In 2013, she was elected as, a member of FDP.The Liberals, to the Grand Council of Geneva. She was a committee member for Environment, Agriculture, and Management, serving as the committee's president from 2017 to 2018. She also was a member of the Social Commission. De Montmollin was re-elected to the council again in 2018 with 21,682 votes.

In 2019, de Montmollin was elected, receiving 32,402 votes, to the National Council. She was elected alongside Christian Lüscher. She is a member of the Committee for Science, Education and Culture and of the delegation for the relations with the French Parliament. She supported the abolition of the stamp duty tax, which is required by Swiss companies when they issue shares or bonds to increase equity.

== Personal life ==
She is married to Alexandre de Montmollin, an oenologist, and has two daughters. Her husband's family is part of the Swiss nobility originally from Auvernier in the Canton of Neuchâtel.
