= Silas C. Overpack =

American blacksmith, wheelwright, and businessman

Silas Chidester Overpack
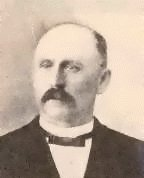
- Silas Chidester Overpack
- Born: March 20, 1841; Chemung county, Pennsylvania
- Died: March 2, 1927 (aged 85); Manistee, Michigan
- Education: public schooling
- Occupations: wagon making trade and inventor
- Spouse: Millie Magoon (1858–1932)
- Children: Roy M., Nellie May, Stella Rae
- Parent(s): George Overpack (1793–1865); Remercy (Chidester) Overpack (1804–1885)

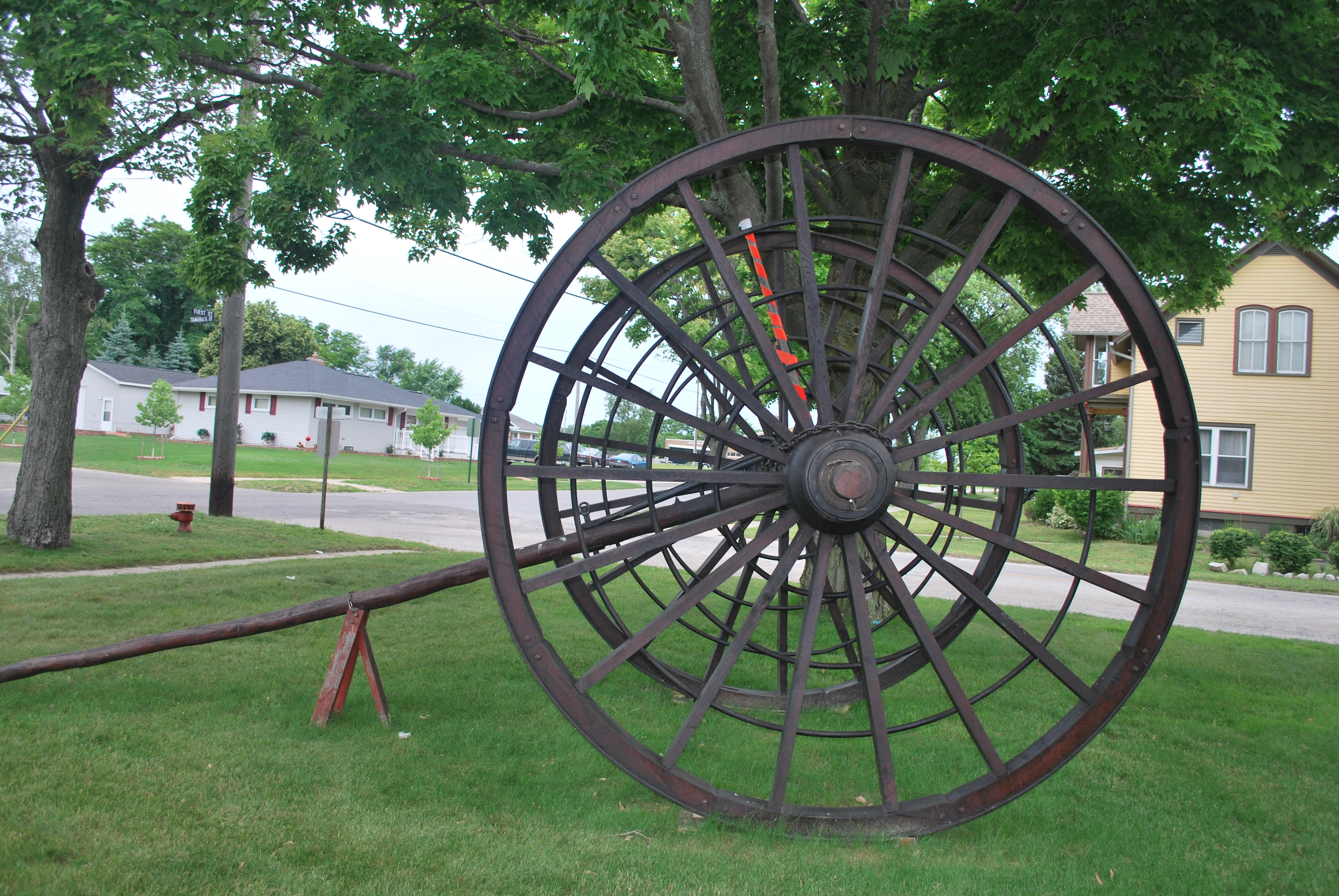
Genuine Overpack logging wheels

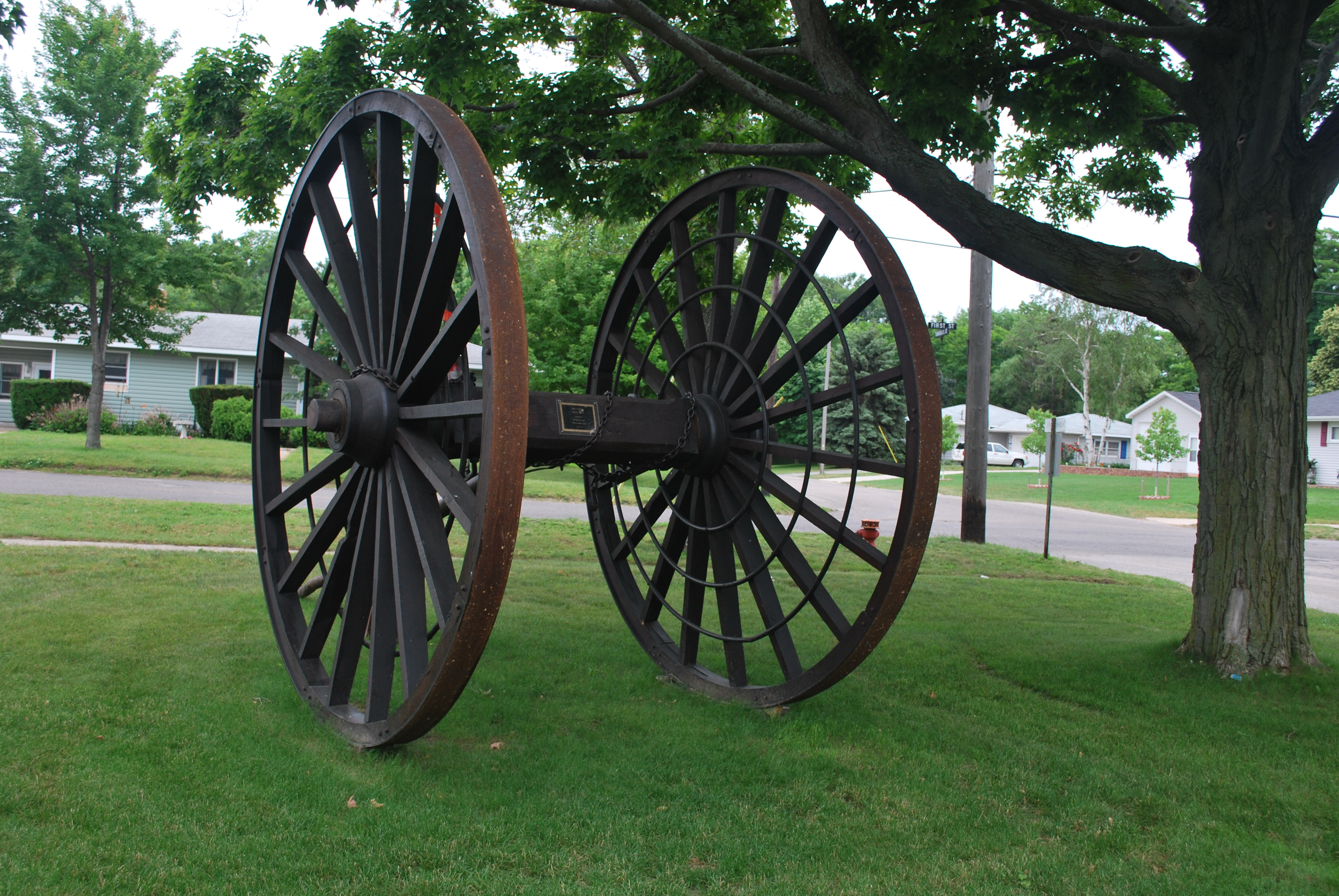
In front of museum at Manistee, Michigan

Silas Chidester Overpack (March 20, 1841 – March 2, 1927) was a blacksmith, wheelwright, and businessman. He owned a shop (around 1868) in downtown Manistee, Michigan, at 87 Pine Street, called S.C. Overpack Wagon, Carriage and Blacksmith Shop and is associated with the invention of Michigan logging wheels. These unusually large wagon wheels (10 feet in diameter) were used in the timber industry for hauling logs in difficult terrain.

== Early childhood ==
Silas Overpack was born in Chemung, Pennsylvania, on March 20, 1841. He was the sixth of ten children. He spent his childhood there where he received his public schooling. His parents were George and Remercy (Chidester) Overpack. They left Pennsylvania around 1850 and ultimately settled in Springfield Township, Oakland County, Michigan, where George rests in the Andersonville Cemetery, Andersonville, Michigan. Remercy and a number of her descendants are interred in the Oak Grove Cemetery, Manistee, Michigan.

== Career ==
Shortly after arriving in Michigan, Overpack entered into apprenticeship of learning the wagon-making trade. In 1868 he moved to Manistee and set up a blacksmith and wagon making business downtown. There he made wagons and sleighs for the thriving lumber industry of northern Michigan. He also sold salt, mill carts, blankets, harnesses, whips, and ropes. He usually employed anywhere from twelve to fifteen people at any one time.

In 1875, he began making special pairs of extra-large wagon wheels that were 10 feet (3.0 m) in diameter called logging wheels or big wheels. They were double the size of ordinary wooden wagon wheels and were for hauling logs from forests that had wet terrain in the summer and heavy snows in the winter. Where he lived fit those criteria as did the Upper Peninsula and other northern states. He sold and shipped his logging wheels all over the United States and Canada.

Overpack used an image of a wooden wagon wheel with spokes as a log mark as required by the 1842 Michigan law for anyone in the timber business.

== Marriage and children ==
In 1871 Overpack married Manistee native Millie Magoon (1858–1932). They had three children: Roy M. (1879–1964), Nellie May (1885– ), and Stella Rae (1891–1962). Roy M. graduated from University of Michigan of Ann Arbor in 1903 in Liberal Arts and received a law degree in 1905. He worked at his father's business. In 1940 Roy was the Secretary for Chamber of Commerce, in Manistee. Nellie May went to Benton Harbor College – she was a music vocal teacher and a singer. Stella Rae attended Oakwood School where Nellie May taught. They both became talented musicians.

== Other ==
Overpack was a member of the board of supervisors of Manistee and also served on the city council. He belonged to the Masonic order and York Rite Masonry as commandery No. 32 and associated with the Knights Templar. He was also affiliated with the Knights of Pythias. His religion was associated with the Unitarian church, although he attended Congregational services. Overpack was a Republican.
