= Agroscope =

Swiss centre for agricultural research

Coordinates: 46.77°N 7.11°E

Agency overview
- Jurisdiction: Federal administration of Switzerland
- Headquarters: Bern
- Parent agency: Federal Office for Agriculture
- Website: agroscope.admin.ch

Agroscope is the Swiss Confederation's center of excellence for agricultural research and is affiliated with the Federal Office for Agriculture, which is subordinate to the Federal Department of Economic Affairs, Education and Research. Agroscope attempts to contribute to a sustainable agriculture and food sector, and maintain an intact environment.

Agroscope consists of three competence divisions for Research Technology and Knowledge Exchange, seven strategic research divisions, and the Resources Unit. Sites are Avenches (Swiss National Stud Farm SNSF), Breitenhof, Cadenazzo, Changins, Conthey, Güttingen (Fruit Growing Pilot Plant), Liebefeld, Posieux, Pully, Reckenholz, Tänikon and Wädenswil.

Agroscope recently adopted a new site strategy that plans to construct a central research campus in Posieux (canton of Fribourg), a research centre in Changins (canton of Vaud), Reckenholz (canton of Zurich), and peripheral experimental stations.

== Organization ==
The Competence Divisions are:

- Animals, Products of Animal Origin, and Swiss National Stud
- Plants and Plant Products
- Methods Development and Analytics

The Strategic Research Divisions are:

- Plant Breeding
- Plant-Production Systems
- Plant Protection
- Animal Production Systems and Animal Health
- Food Microbial Systems
- Agroecology and Environment
- Sustainability Assessment and Agricultural Management

Agroscope's 2022–2025 Work Programme, encompassing over 100 projects, has six core themes or priorities. For each priority, there are strategic research fields (SRF).

- Priority – Agriculture in a Changing Climate
- Priority – Protecting Natural Resources
- Priority – Agroecological Production Systems
- Priority – Cost-Efficient and Species-Appropriate Animal Husbandry
- Priority – Sustainable and Healthy Food
- Priority – Competitive Food Production

== Goals ==
Agroscope researches the entire value chain of the agriculture and food sector. Its stated goals are a competitive and multifunctional agricultural sector, high-quality food for a healthy diet, and an intact environment. In pursuing these aims, the research institute aims to gear itself to the needs of its service recipients.

== History ==
History until 1850

Many regions of the Swiss Plateau were dominated for centuries by the three-field technique. This three-span rotation was divided as follows:

- 1st year: winter wheat
- 2nd year: summer grain (usually oats or barley)
- 3rd year: fallow

In each field, farmers possessed an individual acre. It was not a working association of farmers, but of a village community. The three-field did not permit intensive cultivation of livestock. The common grazing on the fallow, the unfertilized Allmend and the stubble fields, and the lack of winter feeding offered only a meager food supply. For centuries, forest trees were debranched for winter feed. Agriculture froze in the three-field.

In the eighteenth century, agriculture began to change. Young country gentlemen took the management of their estates into their own hands and sought agriculture, especially the raising and promotion of livestock. They stopped adhering rigidly to the three-field technique and began with stall-feeding, careful storage of manure, and planting potatoes and clover on the old fields. The common land was parceled out and divided among the peasants. A new goal came to the fore: to keep enough cattle to supply their own country with enough manure. Amid these developments, the French Revolution broke out. The world was open for innovations.

First stations for education and control (1850–1880)

During the second half of the 19th century, humans had to adapt to the requirements of an industrialized community. Completely new technologies changed their lives and natural sciences offered completely different explanations for life procedures and agricultural production than before.

In the 19th century, Switzerland, therefore, began to find local agricultural institutes. With the new Federal Constitution of 1848, the modern welfare state began to develop. In the 1850s the first, modest agricultural subsidies were paid to farmers.

Until the middle of the 19th century, people had to cultivate their bread grain themselves. For the authorities, the major task of agriculture was the self-sufficiency of states with grain. Until 1860, larger quantities of grain were imported from the Danube countries and overseas.

The birth of the research stations (1874–1914)

The federal government's first step towards agricultural research stations was the development of ETH Zurich, where the first two federal agricultural experimental stations were established in 1878: the Swiss Federal Seed Control Station and the Swiss Federal Agricultural Chemistry Experimental Station. Both stations grew quickly. The Seed Control Station in particular developed into a world-renowned institute. Its founder, Friedrich Gottlieb Stebler, led it for 42 years. The topics studied included fertilisers and feedstuffs, soils, milk, wines, and farm fertilisers. A focal point was the further development of analysis methods. This provided the starting point for the subsequent founding of the Reckenholz location of the present-day Agroscope Reckenholz-Tänikon Research Station (ART). However, the second location, Tänikon TG, was only opened in 1970, at that time as a research station for rural economics and agricultural engineering.

At the end of the 19th century, the vines of West Switzerland were devastated by disease. This marked the establishment of the Vaud Vine Research Station in 1886 and ultimately also the Swiss Federal Research Station in Changins, which resulted from the amalgamation of the Swiss Federal Research Station for Agricultural Chemistry (founded in 1886), the Swiss Federal Seed Control Laboratory (founded in 1898) and the Swiss Federal Vine Research Station (founded in 1915). The Experimental Station for Fruit Production, Viticulture, and Horticulture in Wädenswil had already existed since 1890. The Federal Government took over this station in 1902. These two locations, Changins and Wädenswil, were merged more than a hundred years later to form the Agroscope Changins-Wädenswil Research Station (ACW).

At the end of the 19th century, the federal government built a new experimental station, including a vegetation building and an experimental cheese dairy, in Liebefeld, Bern. The buildings became operational in 1901. Liebefeld thus became the location for the following three stations: the "Experimental Station for Agricultural Chemistry", the "Swiss Dairy Farming Experimental Station" and the estate farm for permits for the sale of agricultural supplies with head office. This head office of the Swiss agricultural experimental and test stations resulted in the Farm Animal Research Station. It moved its location to Posieux FR in 1974. The Liebefeld and Posieux locations merged exactly one hundred years after their foundation to form the Agroscope Liebefeld-Posieux Research Station (ALP).

In 1874 the Federal Government build the Federal Foal Centre in Thun for breeding Freiberger stallions. In 1927 ten mares were added, and the foal center became the Swiss Federal Stud. Since 1998 it has been called the Swiss National Stud. Since 2009 it has belonged to the ALP-Haras unit, together with Agroscope Liebefeld-Posieux (ALP).

This laid the foundation for Agroscope's present three agricultural research stations.

First World War (1914–1918)

During World War 1, Switzerland imported about 85% of the cereal demand.

These bottlenecks in the food supply, especially during the First World War, brought a change in agricultural research. Research prioritized agriculture over grassland and livestock.

Between the World Wars (1919–1938)

After the end of World War I, people wanted to quickly return to a free market. This had disastrous consequences for agriculture. During the First World War, the prices of agricultural commodities increased significantly, and later collapsed.

The importance of cereal crops for food security had been detected. Thus, the Federal Council tried shortly after the war to domestic cereal production through an import monopoly, combined with the acquisition of the domestic crop at a guaranteed price to support and protect against the fluctuations of the global market.

On 1 January 1920, the two research stations "Swiss Seed Investigation and Research" and "Swiss Agricultural Chemistry Research Institution" were combined. As of this date, it received the new name Swiss Federal Agricultural Research Institute Zurich – Oerlikon (ELVA).

Second World War (1939–1945)

As the political situation in Europe worsened, war prevention measures were initiated. At the beginning of World War II, all wartime measures were taken from case to case out of nothing and had to be put out, one was prepared when the war began in 1939 in various relationships significantly better.

With the outbreak of war, the Laboratory provided primarily the service of adaptation and reproduction of agricultural production. In September 1943, the federal government acquired the good Reckenholz on the northern border of Zurich-Affoltern.

Post-war years and the impact of the growing battle (1946–1960)

Thanks to the American Marshall Plan, enormous sums of money flowed into western Europe. This allowed the so-called "post-war economic miracle." The two to decades after the war are known as an increasing time of euphoria and increased modernization. Agriculture was also included in the structural change.

In 1947, world War II price controls lifted and free competition replaced the official price controls.

Period since 1960

The Farm Act of 1951 emphasized the idea that the overproduction of meat and milk can be avoided with a generous promotion of agriculture, which proved to be deceptive. The situation, particularly in the dairy industry, coined the debates and actions of the agricultural policy in those years. In the European Community (EC) overproduction was a known problem.

During this period, the focus of research attention was the development of friendly production methods and improving the quality of crops.

New concepts in agricultural politics (since 1996)

The problems with current agricultural policy and the changing values of society in terms of environmental awareness and quality of life called for new approaches. On 1 January 1999, the new farm bill with the main objectives of "more market, more ecology" was put into force. It aimed to be environmentally friendly, animal-friendly, and tolerant of the sustainability-oriented mode of production. The target was clear: a comprehensive, environmentally sound, and resource-efficient land management, which complies with the care and preservation of the cultural landscape.

A milestone is the so-called Integrated Production (IP). Based on different research and development projects at the Agroscope Changins-Wädenswil Research Station ACW in the sixties and seventies, Integrated Plant Protection – and further on the Integrated Production for Switzerland – was introduced, taking into account integrated pest control. Today, IP in Switzerland equals very often the production after the so-called ÖLN ("ecological performance record") or SUISSE GARANTIE.

With an increasing world population and accelerating climate change, agricultural research faces challenges.

== Famous people ==
Jakob Gujer (1716–1785)

A simple farmer who came from Kleinjogg from Kazereutihoff to fame. Jakob Gujer, also known as Chlyjogg, became famous through the Zurich city doctor Hans Caspar Hirzel, who published a small book in 1761 called The Economy of a Peasant Philosopher. Chlyjogg was born in 1716 in Wermatswil, where he inherited a farm that he managed with great success using new methods he devised. In 1769 he took over the domain Katzenrütti near the Reckenholz yards. The farm consisted of approximately 68 acres and meadows. Chlyjogg continued testing the methods invented in Wermatswil. He tested the application of gypsum and began to use stall-feeding, to produce more manure. Many personalities such as Goethe and Duke Karl August of Weimar visited the Katzenrüttihof. Other famous contemporaries such as Rousseau and Pestalozzi have acknowledged the success of his work.

Friedrich Gottlieb Stebler (1842–1935)

- Founder of the first Swiss seed and Laboratory Investigation

Friedrich Gottlieb Stebler was born on 11 August in Safnern, in the Bernese Seeland, as the son of a farmer. In 1870 he joined the agricultural school Rütti. In 1875, he graduated with a Doctor of Philosophy from the University of Leipzig. Later he founded a private seed control station in the Mattenhof in Bern. In 1876, he moved to Zurich to habilitated in the agricultural department of the Polytechnic. Under Stebler leadership, the seed control station was also developed for the international seed trade recognized as a leading institution. From 1889 to 1916, he headed the editorial board of the Swiss agricultural newspaper The Green. On 3 June 1903, he was made an honorary member of the Highland Agricultural Society of Scotland in Edinburgh.

Ernst August Grete (1848–1919)

- Member of the Board of Directors of the first Swiss agricultural chemistry research station

Ernst August Grete was born 29 September 1848 in Celle (Hannover). He devoted himself to the university in Göttingen to the study of classical philology and later moved into the educational seminar. After his philological studies, he joined the scientific side. In 1878 he was manager of the chemical test station at the agricultural department of the Federal Polytechnic in Zurich. There he worked for more than 40 years.

Hermann Müller-Thurgau (1850–1927)

Hermann Müller-Thurgau was the first director of Wädenswil and father of the world's first scientifically created vine breed.

Hermann Müller was born in Tägerwilen on Lake Constance. He studied natural sciences at ETH Zurich. In 1874 he was awarded a Ph.D. in Würzburg, Germany, and later became director of the Institute for Plant Physiology at the Geisenheim Research Station, Germany. In 1890 he became the first director of Wädenswil, the present-day Agroscope Changins-Wädenswil Research Station (ACW), and was a pioneer in the field of vine cultivation. He is considered the father of the Müller-Thurgau vine, which was crossed in 1882 and is the world's first scientifically created new vine breed. It displaced old varieties such as Elbling and Räuschling, and is the most successful specifically cultivated vine variety: More than 41,000 ha are cultivated worldwide, which corresponds to almost three times the total vine area of Switzerland. It is most widespread in Germany; in German-speaking Switzerland, it is still the most common white wine variety today. For a long time, this vine variety was thought to be a crossing between Riesling and Silvaner. In 1998 an Austrian research team discovered, based on molecular-genetic tests, that the crossing partners were not Riesling x Silvaner, but Riesling x Madeleine Royal. How this mix-up could have occurred has never been discovered. However, this fact has given new impetus to the vine variety's second name, Müller-Thurgau.

Albert Volkart (1873–1951)

- First Director of the Swiss agricultural experimental station Zurich-Oerlikon
- The great pioneer of Swiss agriculture Albert Volkart, was born in 1873 in Zurich. In 1891 he began his studies at the agricultural department of the Polytechnic in Zurich. After the final examination in 1894, he joined as an assistant to Friedrich Gottlieb Stebler in this institution, where he was later an assistant and the management board, where he worked for 35 years. Volkart dealt extensively with issues of plant protection. In 1917, Volkart replaced the retired CEO of Friedrich Gottlieb Stebler seeds Investigation and Research, and three years later, he became head of the Swiss agricultural experimental station Zurich-Oerlikon. In 1925 he became a professor of agronomy at the ETH.

Friedrich Traugott Wahlen (1899–1985)

- Director of the Federal Agricultural Research Institute Zurich-Oerlikon

Friedrich Traugott Wahlen was born in 1899 in Gmeis Mirchel in the Emmental. As a small child, he wanted to be a farmer. In 1917 he began his study of agriculture at the Polytechnic in Zurich. He acted in several roles:

- 1929–1943: Executive Board of the Swiss agricultural experimental station Zurich-Oerlikon
- 1938–1945: Member of the Federal War Food Office
- 1942–1949: Council of the Canton of Zurich
- 1943–1949: Professor of Agronomy at the agricultural department of the ETH

In 1949 he was appointed to the FAO (Food and Agricultural Organization), first to Washington and then in 1951, to Rome, where he presided as director of the Department of Agriculture from 1950 to 1952 and was chief of the technical assistance program. In 1958 he was appointed Deputy Director-General of the FAO. On 11 December 1958, the Federal Assembly elected him to the Federal Council, where he first was the Minister of Justice and Police, later he led the Ministry of the Department of Economics and then was the Foreign Minister of the Political Department. Until the 1965 elections, he was a Federal Council.

Rudolf Koblet (1904–1983)

Rudolf Koblet was a member of the Executive Board of the Swiss Federal Agricultural Research Institute Zurich-Oerlikon.

On 13 February 1904 Rudolf Koblet was born in Heiterthal, not far from Kollbrunn in Tösstal. He attended the Industrial School in Winterthur, and in 1923 began his studies at the Department of Agriculture of the ETH. In 1926 he graduated with a diploma as an engineer-agronomist. After a stay in France, he went to Canada where he acquired specialized knowledge in the field of control seeds as a volunteer in the Seed Branch in Ottawa. In 1929 he joined the line for seed control in Oerlikon. With his work "On the germination Pinus strobus with particular reference to the origin of the seed," he earned his doctorate in 1932 Dr.sc.techn. ETH. In 1949 he became head of the Department of Agronomy at the ETH.

Rudolf Salzmann (1912–1992)

Rudolf Salzmann was the director of the Swiss Federal Agricultural Research Station for Agronomy Zurich- Reckenholz, and the planner and builder of the Research Institute Reckenholz.

Rudolf Salzmann was born on 2 January 1912 in Bern. From 1930 to 1933, he completed his agriculture studies at the ETH. He oversaw the procurement of seed in the war food office under Frederick Traugott and then took a slightly later point in agricultural chemistry from the Swiss Federal Institute Liebefeld, where he worked on the agronomic aspects and problems of the institution. In 1944, he was transferred to the agricultural experimental station Oerlikon. His election as successor to Director Koblet took place on 1 November 1951, when he took responsibility for both academic work and organizational and administrative issues.

Simone de Montmollin (b. 1968)

Simone de Montmollin, a member of the National Council, works as an oenologist and was a communications specialist at Agroscope from 2014 to 2017.

== Full-time positions since 2007 ==
Raw data

Source: "Federal Finance Administration FFA: Data portal".

== See also ==
- Agriculture in Switzerland

== Bibliography ==
- Popp, Hans (2001): Entstehung und Entwicklung der landwirtschaftlichen Forschungsanstalten, Bern
- Sieber, Robert; Rüegg, Max (2002): 100 Jahre Eidgenössische Forschungsanstalt für Milchwirtschaft. FAM-Information 441, 48 pages.
- Lehmann, Josef (2003): Von der Kontrollstation zum nationalen Zentrum für Agrarökologie: Zur Geschichte der landwirtschaftlichen Forschungsanstalt Zürich-Reckenholz 1878-2003, Zürich.
- Website Agroscope: Gestüt, Vom Hengstendepot zum Schweizerischen Nationalgestüt
- Flyer Agroscope
- Bundesamt für Landwirtschaft, Agroscope (Hrsg.) (2009): Agroscope Jahresbericht 2009, Zürich.
