= Einsiedler =

Swiss breed of horse

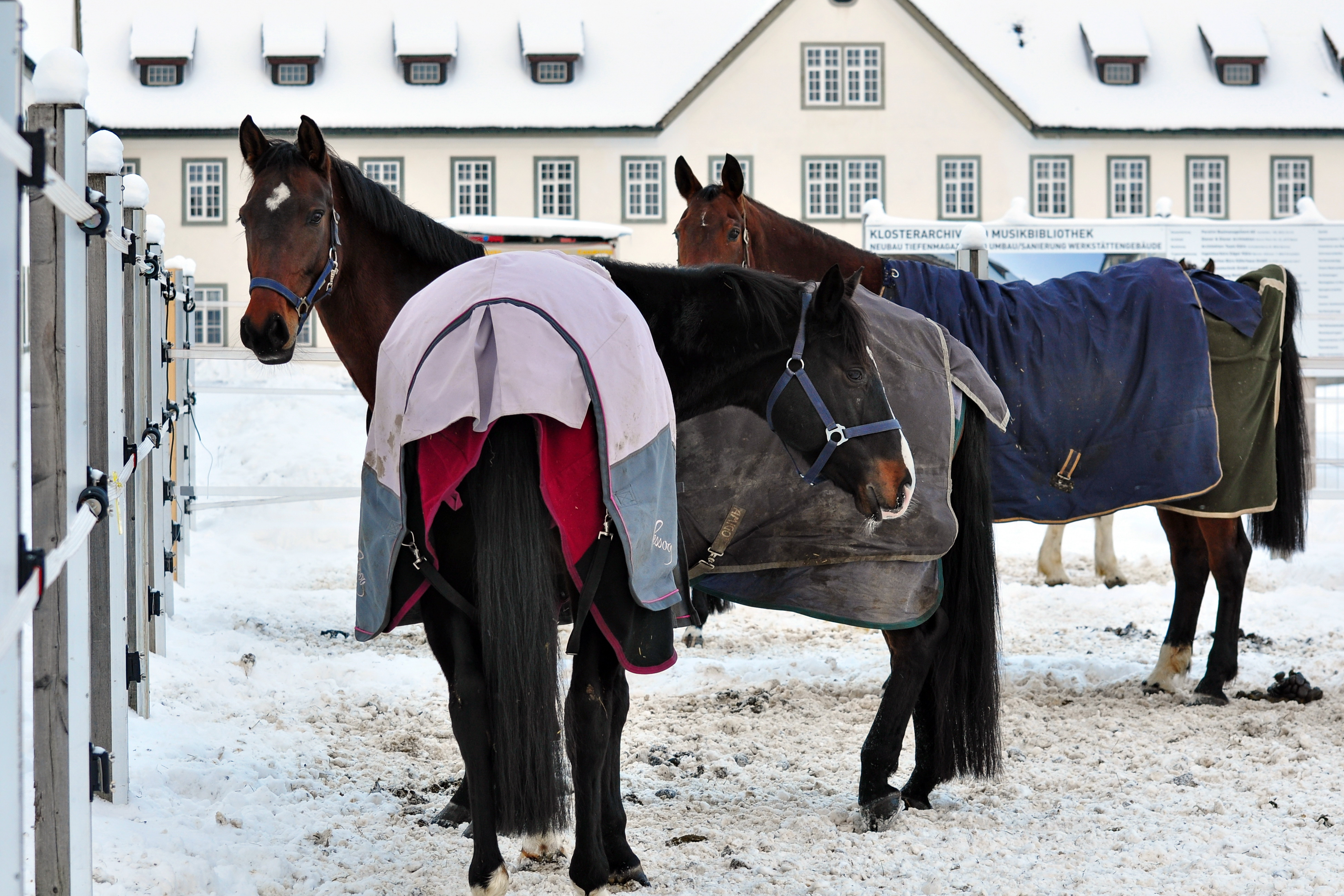
- In the Abbey of Einsiedeln
- Conservation status: FAO (2007): no data; DAD-IS (2023): extinct
- Other names: Einsiedeln; Cavallo della Madonna
- Country of origin: Switzerland

The Einsiedler or Einsiedeln is a historic Swiss population or breed of warmblood horse with roots going back to the eleventh century. It was – and still is – bred at the Benedictine Abbey of Einsiedeln in the Canton of Schwyz, and is sometimes known as the Cavallo della Madonna. In the mid-twentieth century the stud-book was discontinued and the Einsiedler was merged with the Swiss Halfblood and with traditional local breeds including the Ajoie, the Erlenbacher and the Entlebucher to create the Swiss Warmblood, a modern sport horse. Although it is reported to be extinct, the traditional type is still bred at the abbey; there are perhaps a hundred of them in all, with fewer than ten foals born each year.

Breeding records were kept at the abbey from 1655; a more detailed stud-book was begun in 1784.

== See also ==
- Erlenbach horse
