= Erlenbach horse =

Extinct horse breed in Switzerland

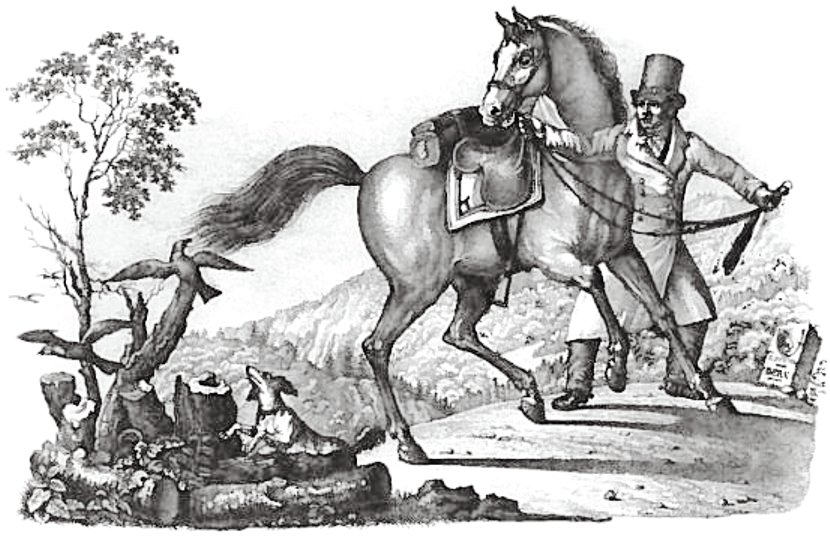
- Erlenbach horse on an 1827 lithograph
- Country of origin: Switzerland

Traits
- Height: From 1.52 m to 1.63 m
- Color: Always black

The Erlenbach horse, or Simmental horse, is an ancient light horse breed from the Erlenbach im Simmental region of Switzerland. Known since the 18th century, when the annual market sale of 10,000 horses brought in considerable revenue, the breed suffered a long decline in the following century, mainly due to the introduction of railroads. It probably disappeared during the 20th century, as breeders turned to cattle breeding.

This black-colored saddle horse, rather late in life and of medium size, is known to be conformed, with strong, muscular limbs. It is regarded by the Bernese cavalry, who use it for remounting, not least because its coat matches the soldiers' uniforms. It is also used as a saddle horse and as a luxurious carriage. Breeding takes place mainly in the Simmental region and near Saanen.

== History ==
The breed was well developed in the 18th century, when some twenty breeding stallions were active near Erlenbach. It was derived from a variety of stallions, notably Andalusians and Thoroughbreds. The black stallion Lord IV, born in 1871 to a Thoroughbred mare, exerted a strong influence. Three autonomous breeds were then distinguished in Switzerland: the Einsiedeln or Schwyz horse, and the Erlenbach or Simmental are so-called half-bred types, as opposed to the Freiberger, which is a working breed.

Numbers declined throughout the 19th century, despite support measures introduced by the Canton of Berne. In the 1850s, the progress of the railroads was detrimental to the breeding of Swiss carriage horses and half-bloods. They fell to a low point at the beginning of the 20th century, when the majority of Simmental breeders preferred to turn to cattle breeding and the more lucrative production of cheese. Sources differ, with the Erlenbach breed cited as lost by some specialists when, around 1901, a single 20-year-old breeding stallion was cited by the Bernese Horse Breeding Commission as the breed's ultimate representative. However, a small-scale breeding of small, lively, black-coated half-bloods seems to have continued until the end of the 20th century in certain remote areas of the upper Simmental and Ormont mountains.

== Description ==
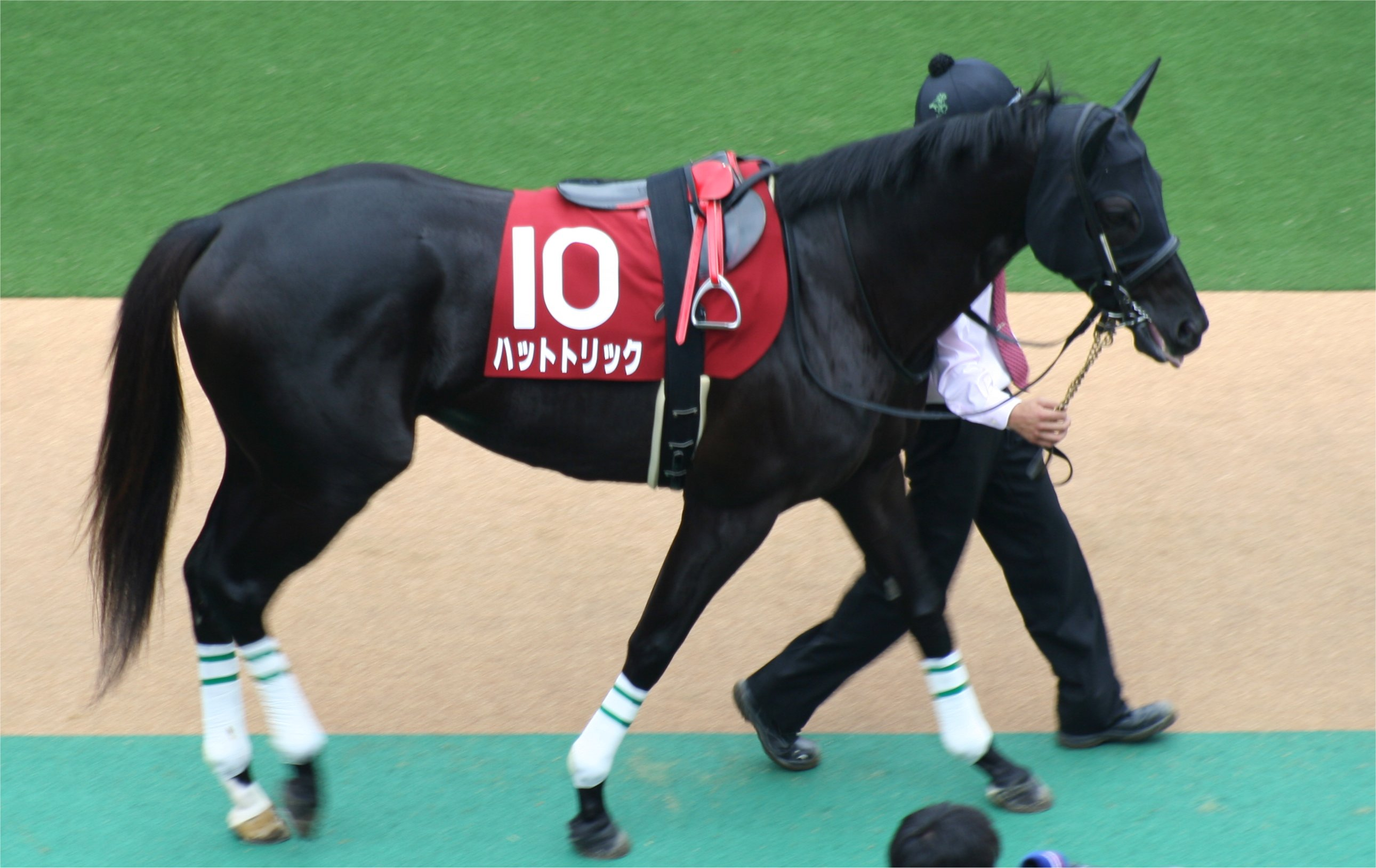
The coat is black, as with this Thoroughbred, and usually zain.

This is a particularly elegant, well-proportioned breed, described as excellent by Philippe de Golbéry. Height ranges from around 1.52 to 1.58 m, according to the Bernese Horse Breeding Commission for horse breeding in 1871 (according to another source in 1894, from 1.57 to 1.63 m). The head is fairly light, with large eyes. The neck is rounded, the withers well defined. The back is fairly straight and broad, the loins solid and wide. The rump is rounded and rather level, the trunk is of medium length and the chest is fairly broad. Legs are strong-boned and muscular, generally clean and well shaped. They end in black hooves. The manes are well furnished, and dewlap is generally sparse.

The coat is always black, generally zain, with only light markings permitted. The breed is rather late, and is not used before the age of five. On the other hand, it retains its working ability well into old age.

== Usage ==
The Erlenbach horse is essentially a cavalry horse, much appreciated in the Canton of Berne since its black coat, coordinated with the riders' red uniform and yellow saddlecloth, is reminiscent of the canton's banner. The Eastern Switzerland Cavalry Committee expressly calls for the crossing of Erlenbach and Schwyz mares with imported Thoroughbred stallions, to improve the quality of cavalry mounts.

It was also used as a luxury saddle and carriage horse. In the early 19th century, it was not uncommon to see them in the Bernese countryside, mounted or harnessed. In a way, they were part of the landscape.

== Breeding spread ==
The breed owes its name to the community of Erlenbach im Simmental, where a famous horse market was held in the 18th and early 19th centuries. In 1770, according to a chronicle from the canton of Berne, 10,000 of these horses were sold annually, bringing in an income of 500,000 to 600,000 thalers. In 1776, horses sold at fairs in Erlenbach and Reutigen, in the Lower Simmental, brought in over two million pounds.

The town then organized two annual fairs to sell the local breed of horse, reputed to be "superb". The Erlenbach horse is mainly found in the Simmental and Saanen regions. In other Swiss cantons, they may be crossed with Freiberger.

== See also ==
- Erlenbach im Simmental
- Simmental
- Einsiedler
- Canton of Schwyz

== Bibliography ==
- Poncet, Pierre-André (2009). Le Cheval des Franches-Montagnes à travers l'histoire (in French). Société jurassienne d'émulation. ISBN 978-2940043408.
