= Horse logging =

Forestry practice

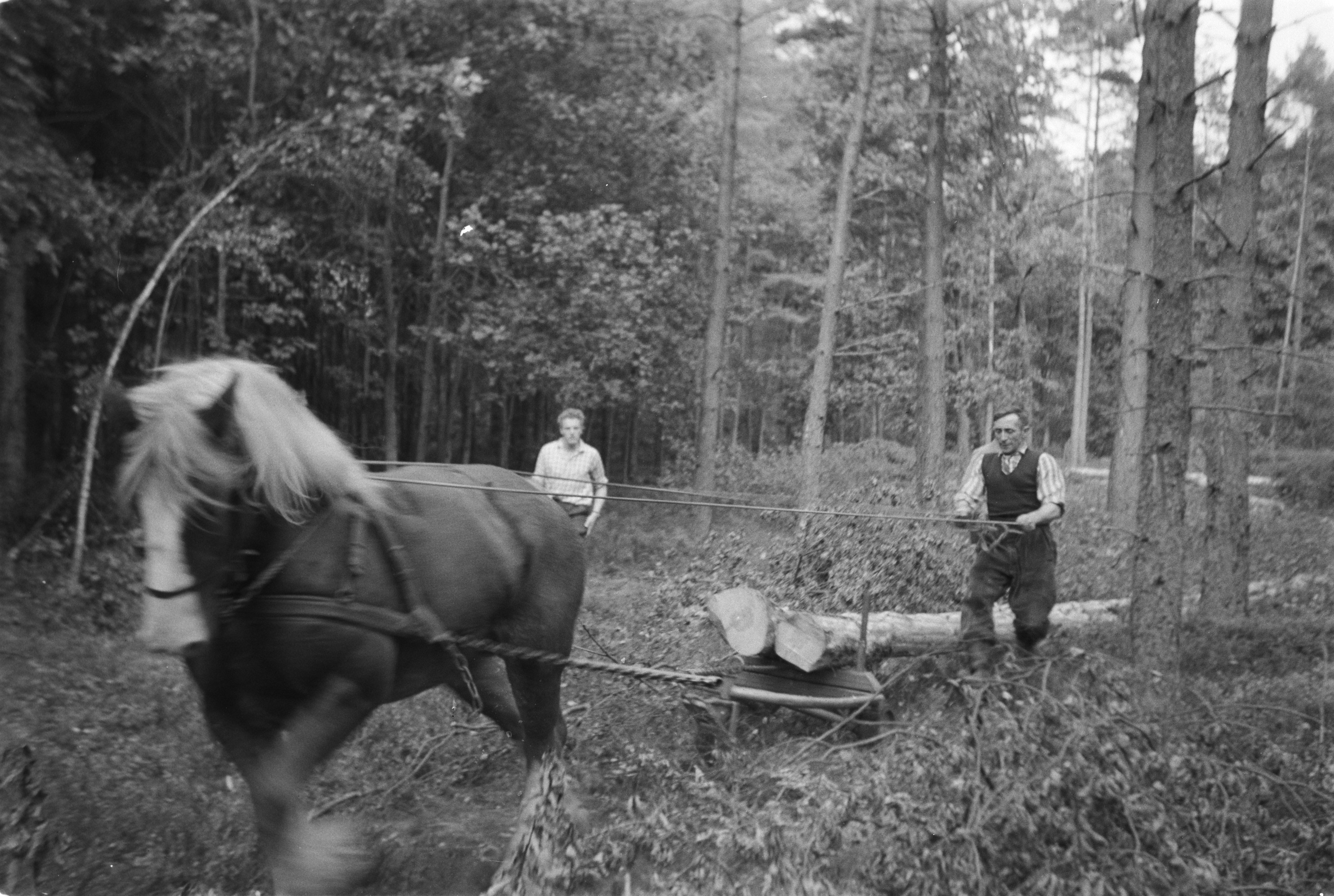
Pulling logs out of the forest

Horse logging is the use of horses or mules in forestry. Horses may be used for skidding and other tasks. Because of their maneuverability, horses can efficiently extract select trees from a forest without damaging nearby young growth or the usual roadbuilding required to accommodate powered vehicles. Even today, using horses for small-scale logging can be more efficient, especially on smaller privately held forest parcels.

== Skidding ==
Moving logs from the cutting site to the loading site—called skidding—is most simply done by dragging the logs on the ground with a chain. However, it is more difficult to ground-skid with heavier logs and rough or soft ground. Much logging was done in the wintertime when the ground was frozen hard and roads iced over. Several methods were invented to assist with the movement of large logs including sliding logs using sledges. Using heavy four, six, or eight wheeled wagons required lifting logs completely onto the wagons. The inventions of two-wheeled devices allowed logging to occur year-round, mostly by lifting the front end of the log above the ground while allowing the tail end of the log to drag.

The first bummers were low cart-like devices with small wheels where the front end of the log would be placed on top. But the concept of hanging the log under the axle by a chain provided the next boost in technology. Simple ones were called logging arches. In the 1870s, the high-wheel or big-wheel was invented in Michigan. High-wheels had 6-foot to 10-foot diameter wheels, and a special cam for the liftchain. Horses would back the wheels to straddle the front end of the log, and would be unhitched. The device would tip, lifting the horse team's drive pole into the air while lowering the cams toward the log. The chains would be wrapped around the log, and when the pole was drawn back down to rehitch the horses, the chains would tighten on the cams and the front of the log would be lifted off the ground. As the use of the high-wheel spread, wheel diameters were increased, and brakes were added to reduce accidents. One such brake design lifted the logs only when the horses were pulling. On downhills, if the logs crept close to the horses, the log would automatically start to lower and slow or stop forward motion—an automated braking system. The former high-wheel is called a stiff-tongue and the latter a slip-tongue.

Larger wheels made for easier pulling by the horses, and could accommodate larger tree trunk sizes. High-wheels made it possible for a team of horses to pull 12 to 100 foot long logs and enough logs to total 1,000 to 2,000 board feet of lumber in a single load. In the US, by 1920 mechanical skidders had replaced horses for pulling high-wheels.

Skidding methods and equipment

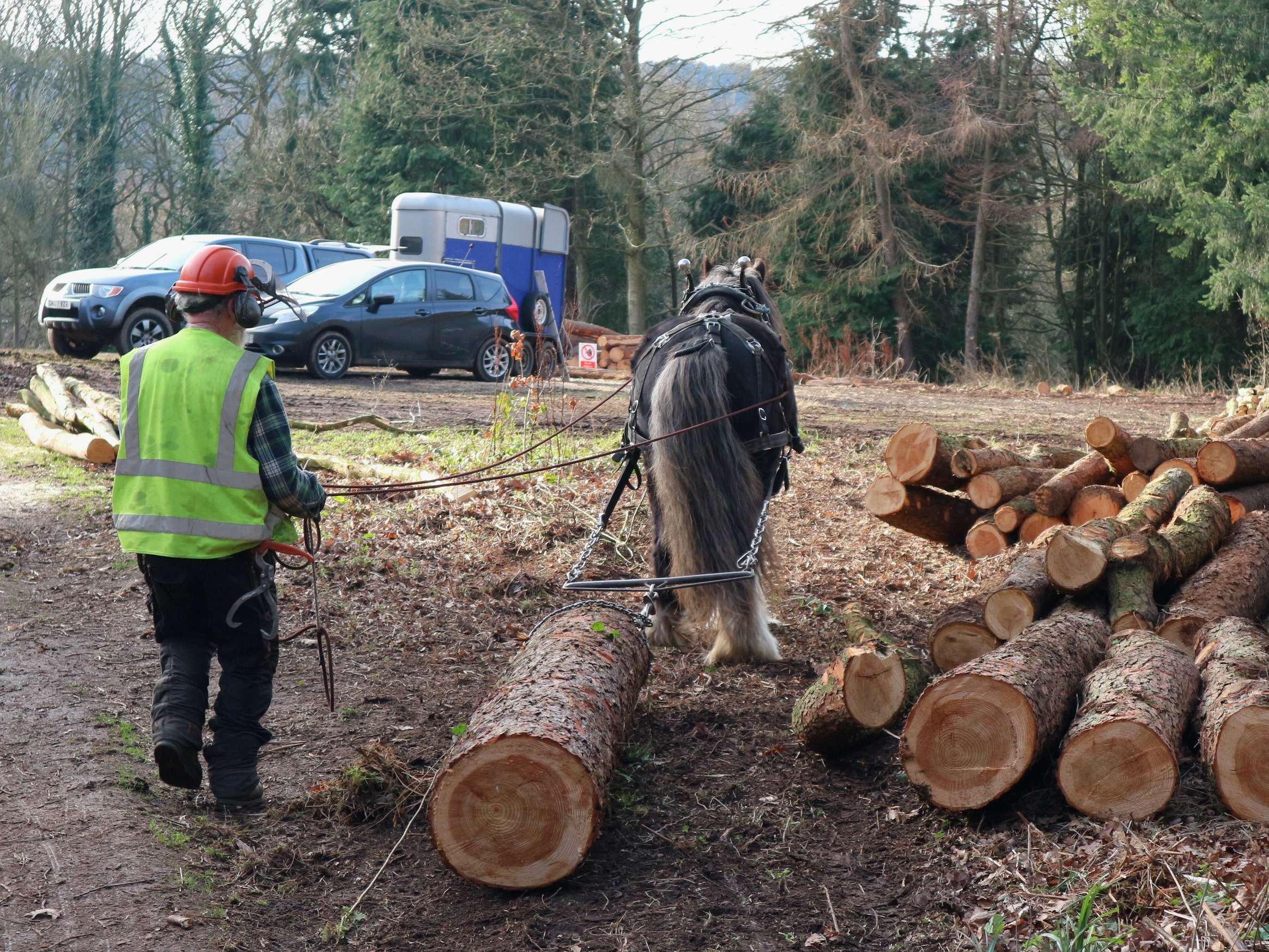
Ground dragging

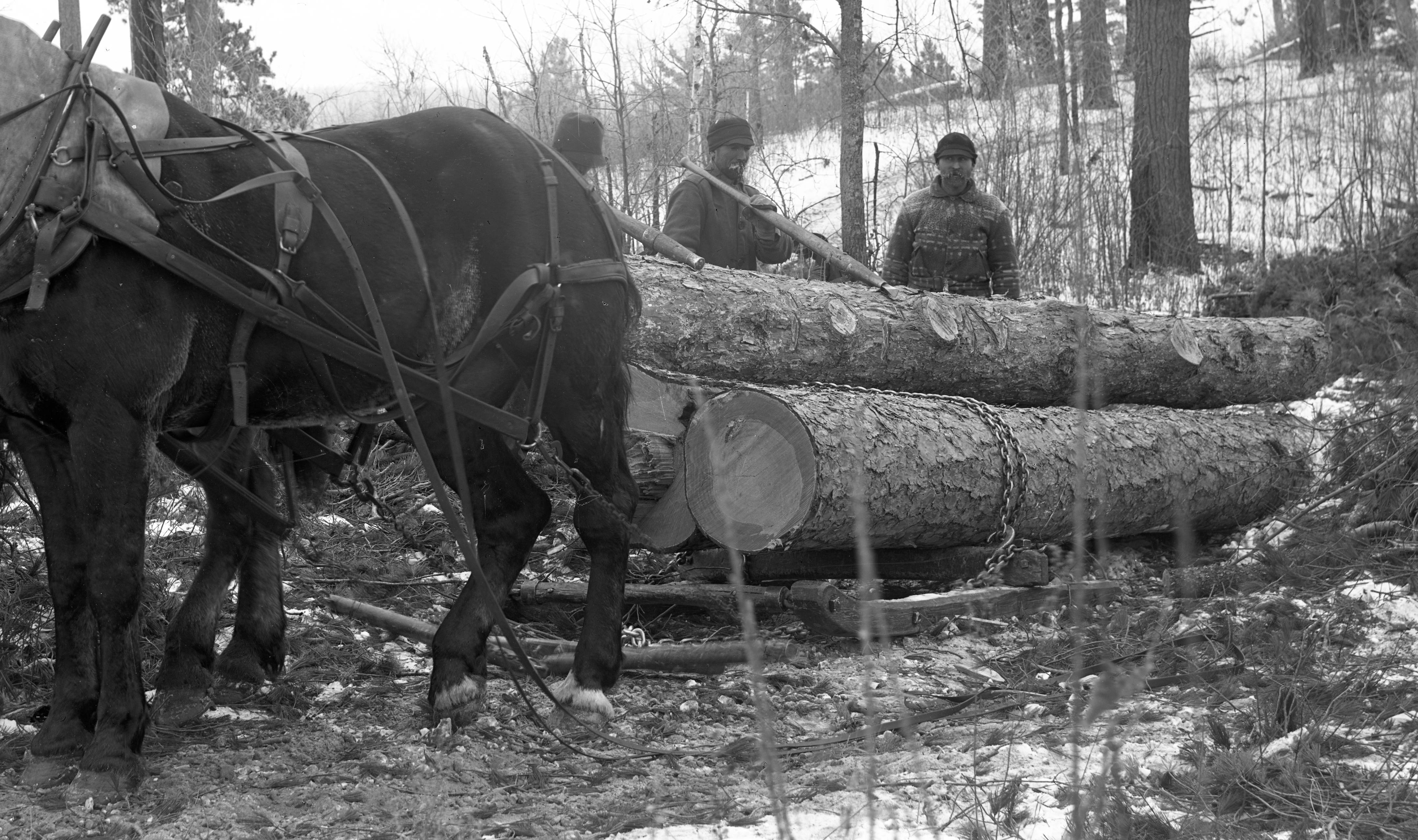
Ground sled

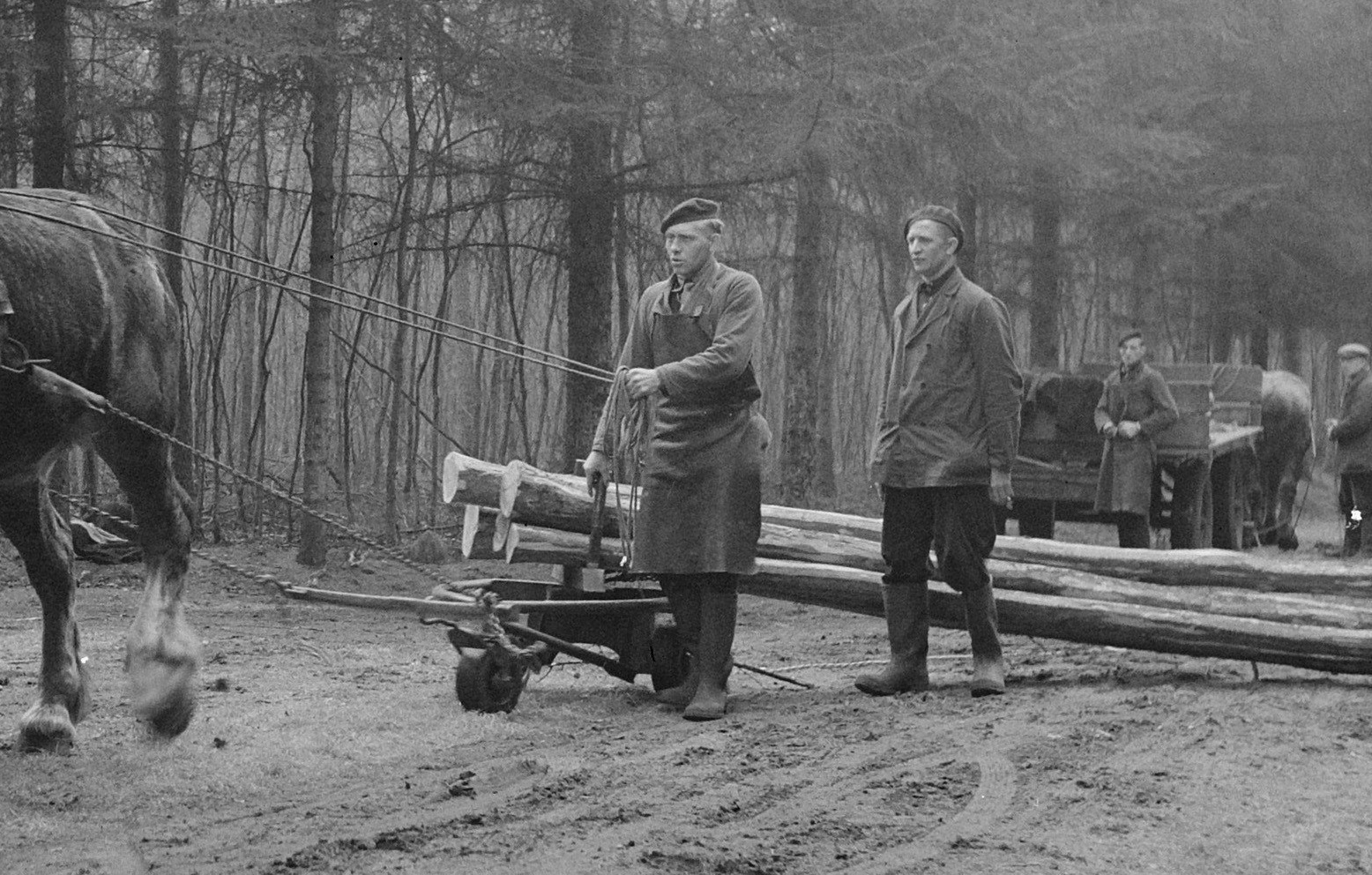
A bummer

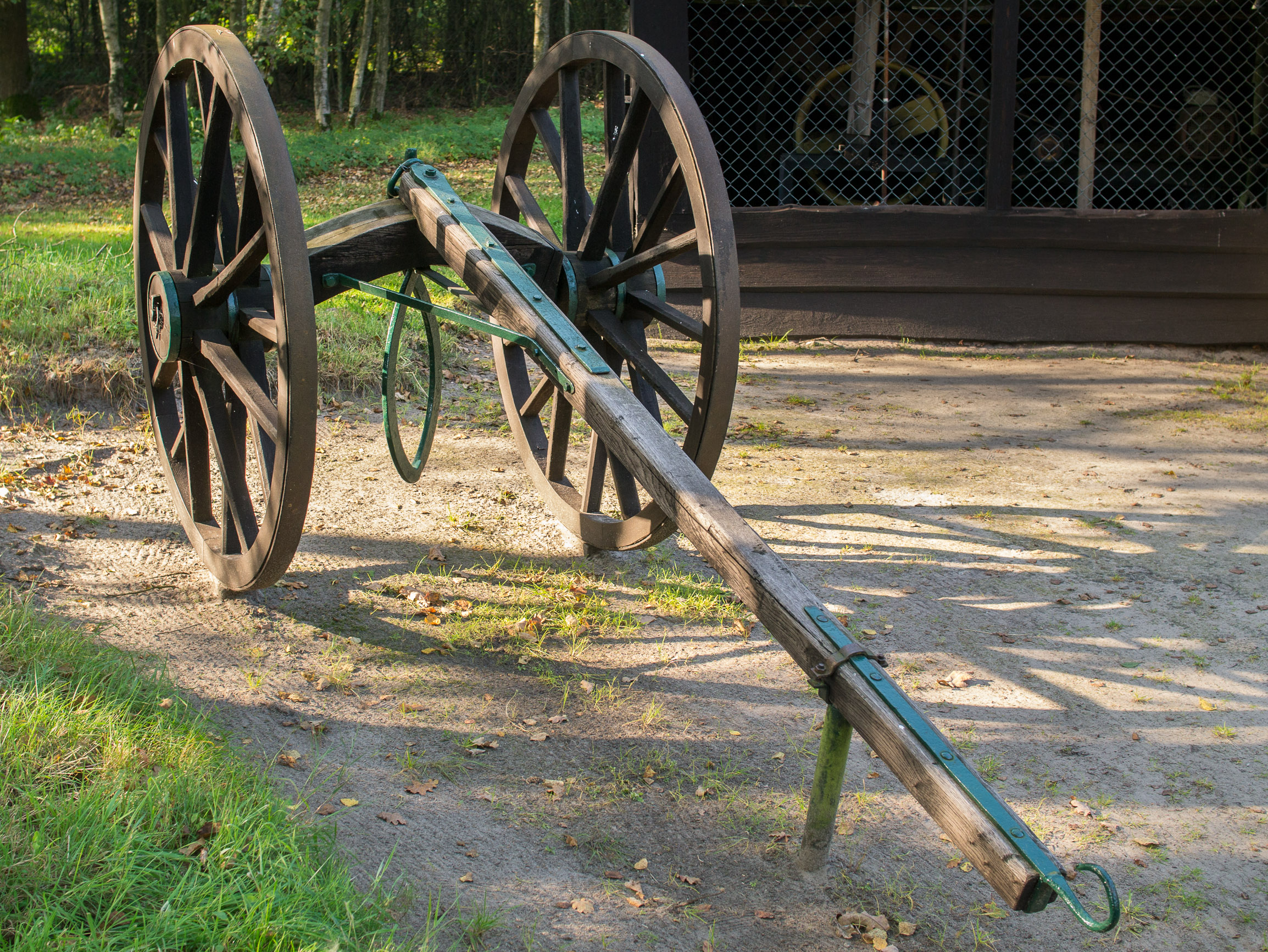
Simple lever-based logging arch

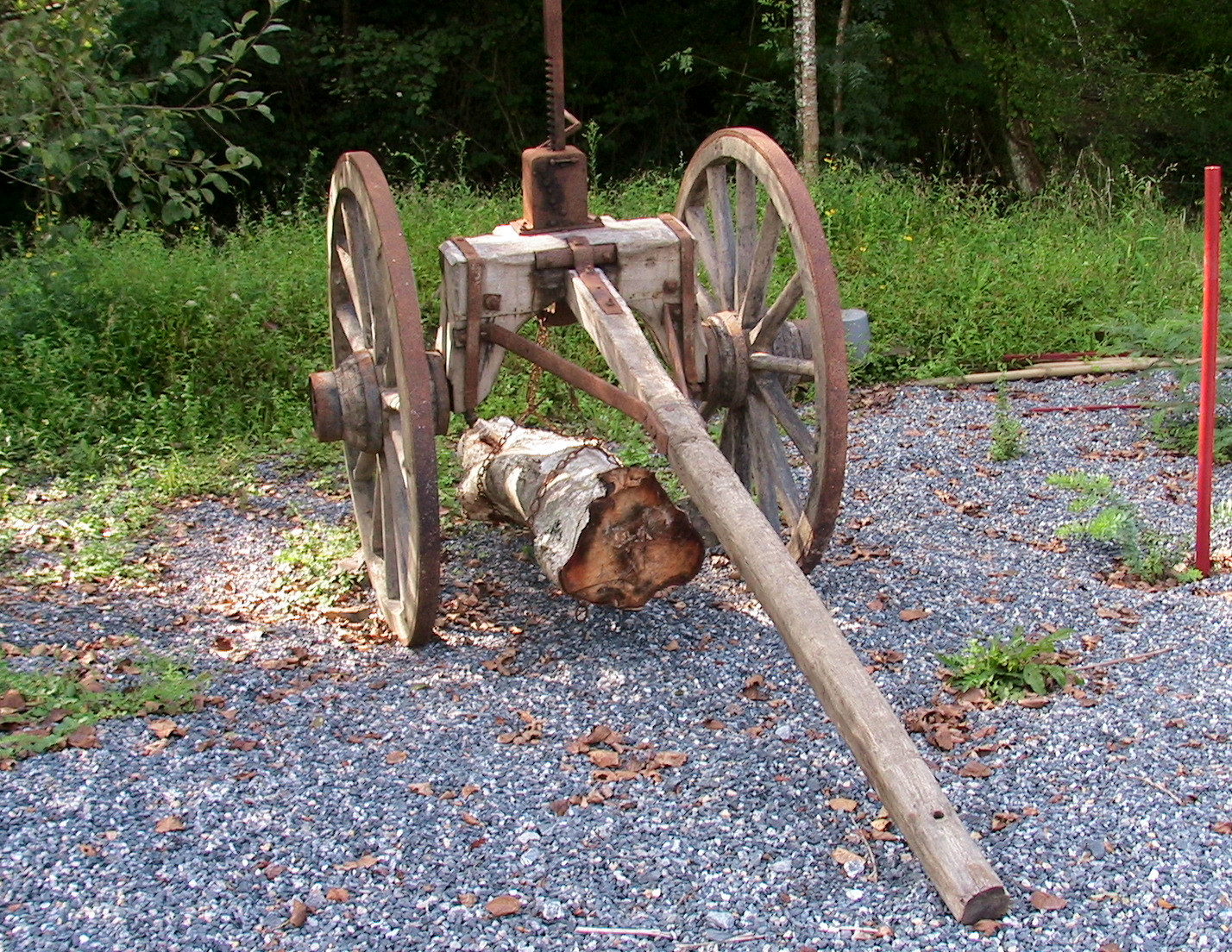
Logging arch with crank for lift

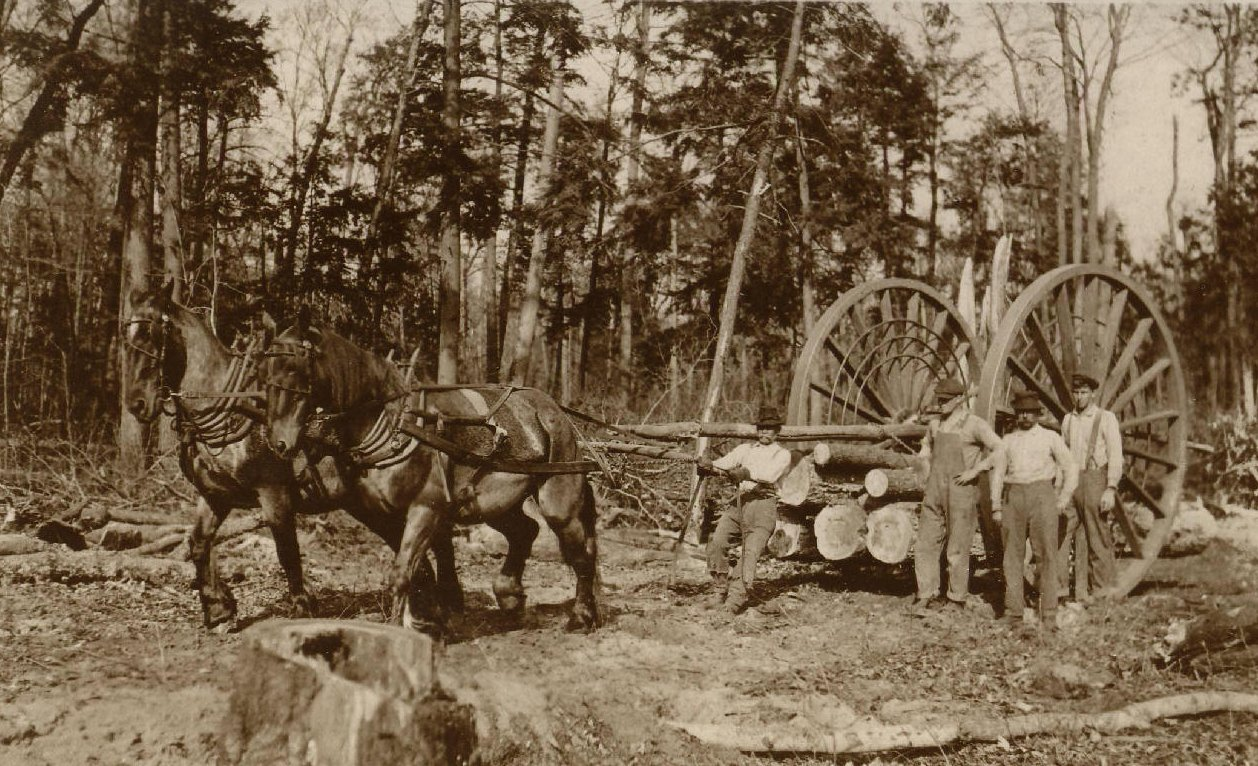
A high-wheel

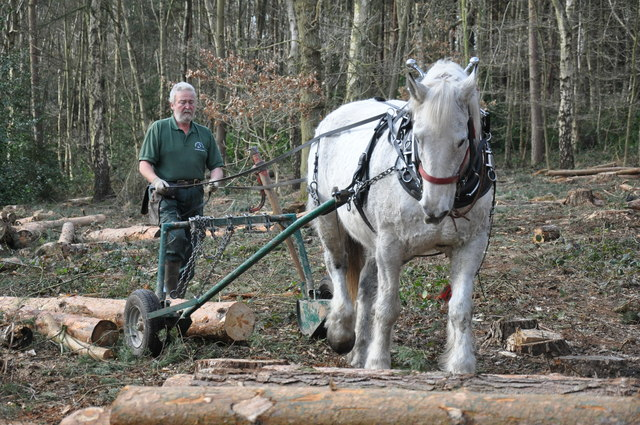
Modern lightweight logging wheels

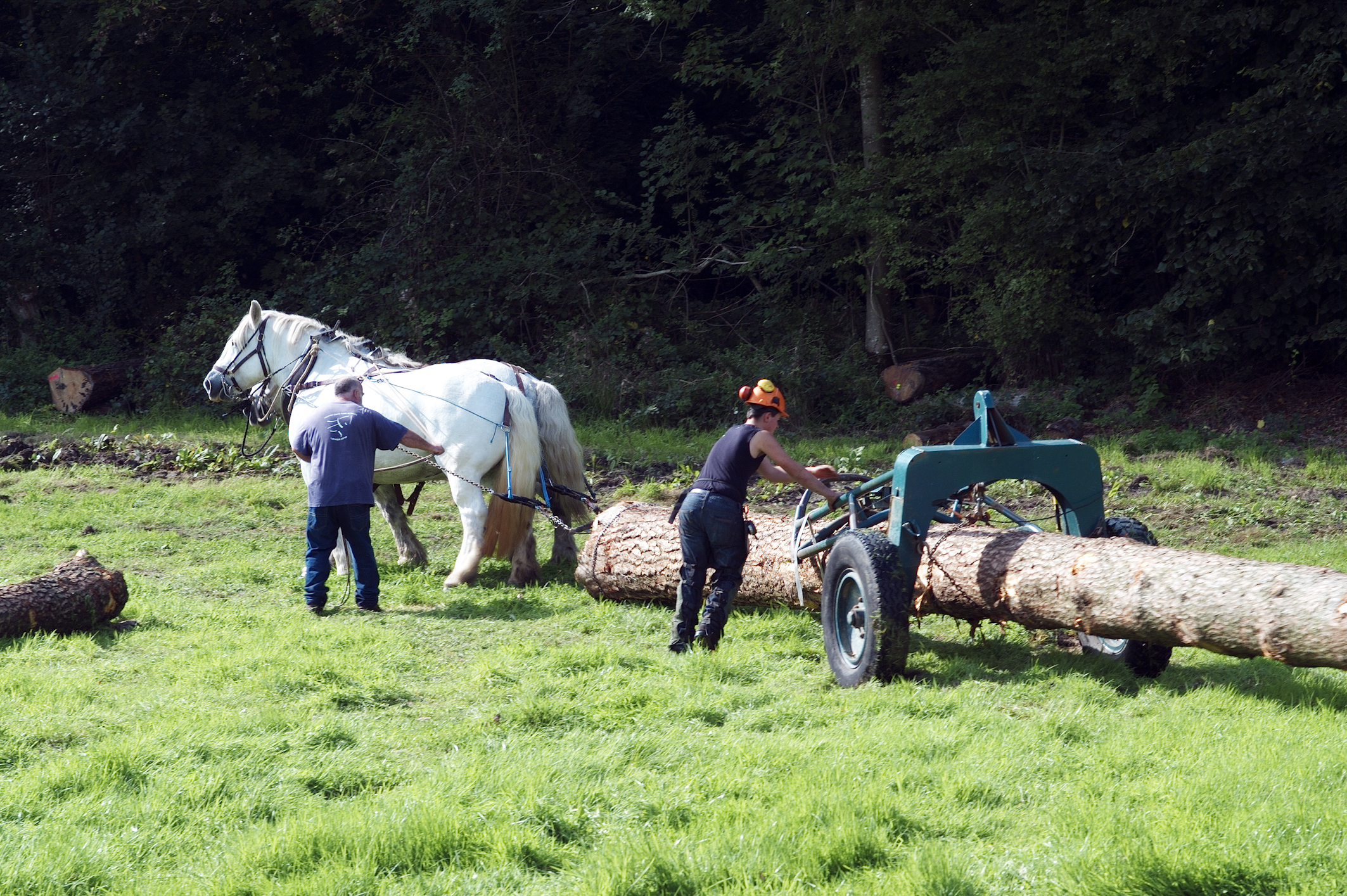
Modern heavyweight logging wheels

== Equipment terms ==
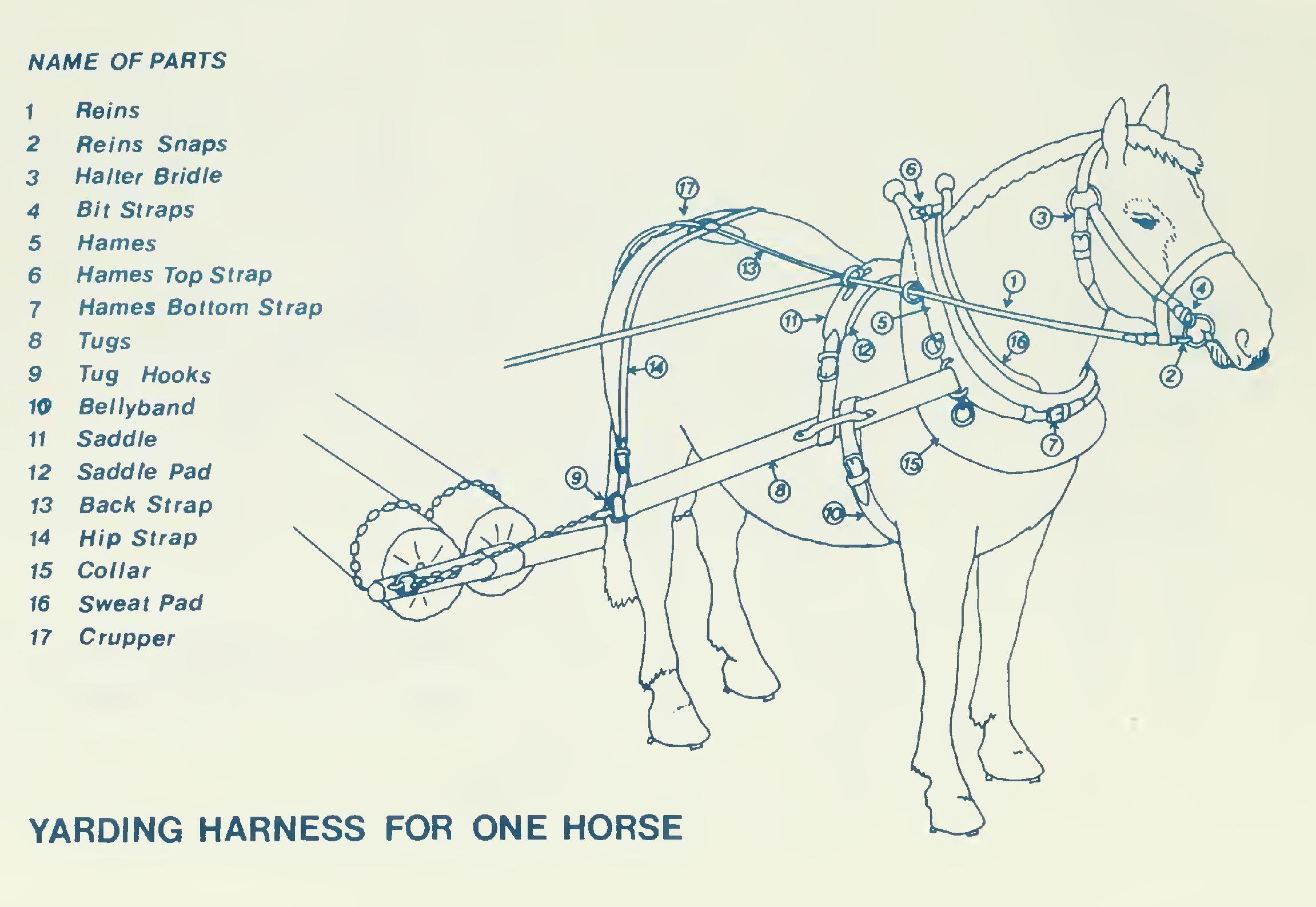
Yarding harness for one horse

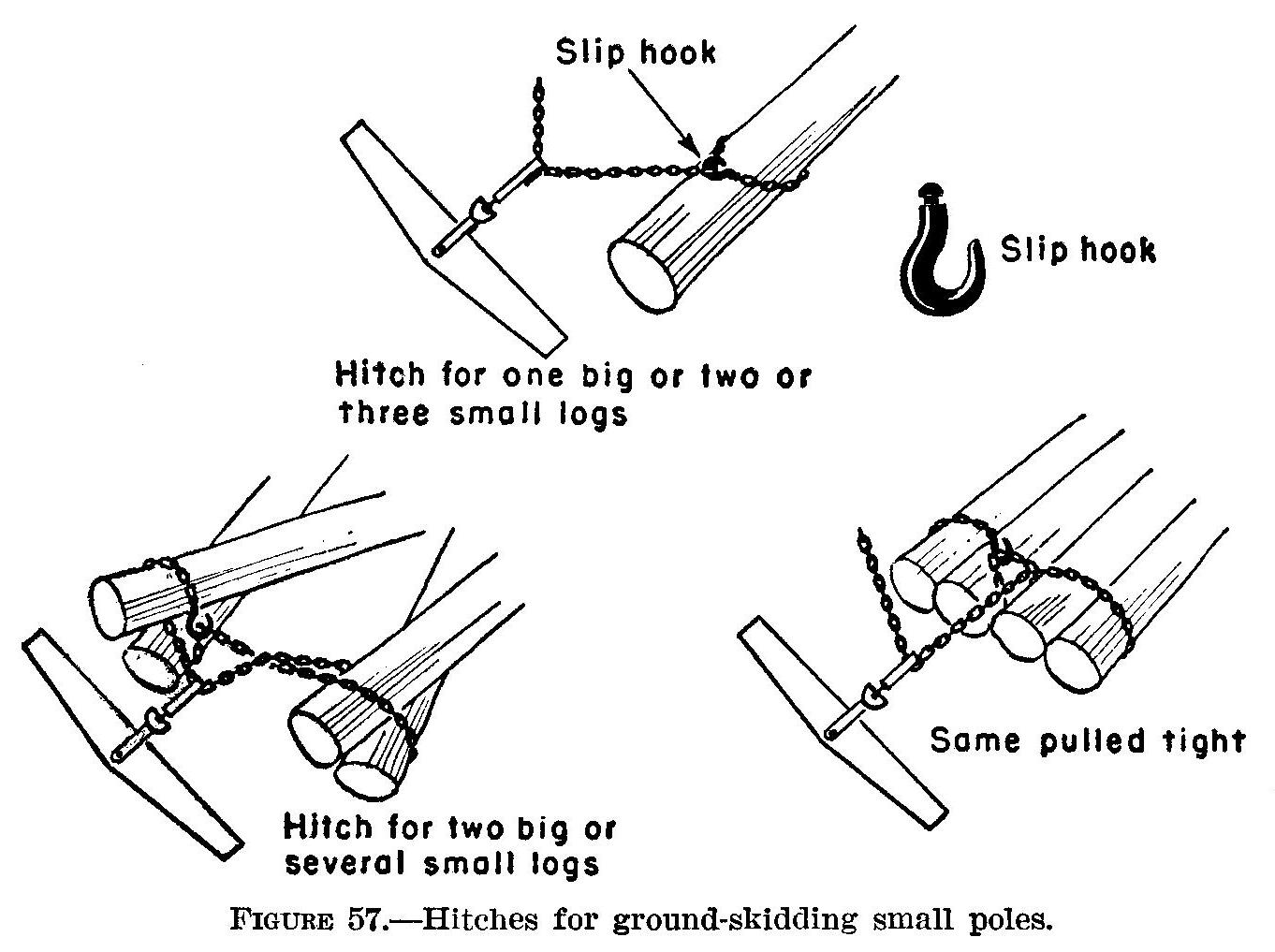
Hitches for ground-skidding small poles

- Skidding harness: a specialized harness to allow the horse to drag logs
- Whiffletree: bar placed between the horse and the load, acting as a pivot point; attached at the front to the traces/tugs (leather straps or chains from the horse), and at the rear to the chain wrapped around the logs.
- Go-devil: a simple, loosely articulated sled without thills (shafts) or a tongue generally used for skidding long logs behind a horse
- Scoot: a heavy sled on which logs or bolts are carried completely off the ground in several different sizes, depending on the pulling power to be used, ranging from a horse to a heavy tractor

== See also ==
- Silas C. Overpack — associated with the invention of Michigan logging wheels
- Skidder
- Skidding (forestry)
- Driving (horse)
- Horse-drawn vehicles
