= Federal Office for Agriculture =

Swiss government agency

- (in German) Bundesamt für Landwirtschaft (in French) Office fédéral de l’agriculture (in Italian) Ufficio federale dell'agricoltura

Agency overview
- Jurisdiction: Federal administration of Switzerland
- Headquarters: Bern
- Minister responsible: Guy Parmelin, Federal Councillor
- Parent agency: Federal Department of Economic Affairs, Education and Research
- Child agency: Agroscope
- Website: blw.admin.ch

The Federal Office for Agriculture (FOAG) (Note: German: Bundesamt für Landwirtschaft, BLW, French: Office fédéral de l’agriculture, OFAG, Italian: Ufficio federale dell'agricoltura, UFAG) is Switzerland's competence centre for agricultural issues, responsible for agricultural policy and for direct payments to Swiss farmers. It is also responsible for Agroscope, the Swiss Confederation's center of excellence for agricultural research.

The FOAG is subordinated to the Federal Department of Economic Affairs, Education and Research.

== Full-time positions since 2001 ==
Raw data

"Federal Finance Administration FFA: State financial statements".
"Federal Finance Administration FFA: Data portal".
