= Freiberger =

Swiss breed of horse

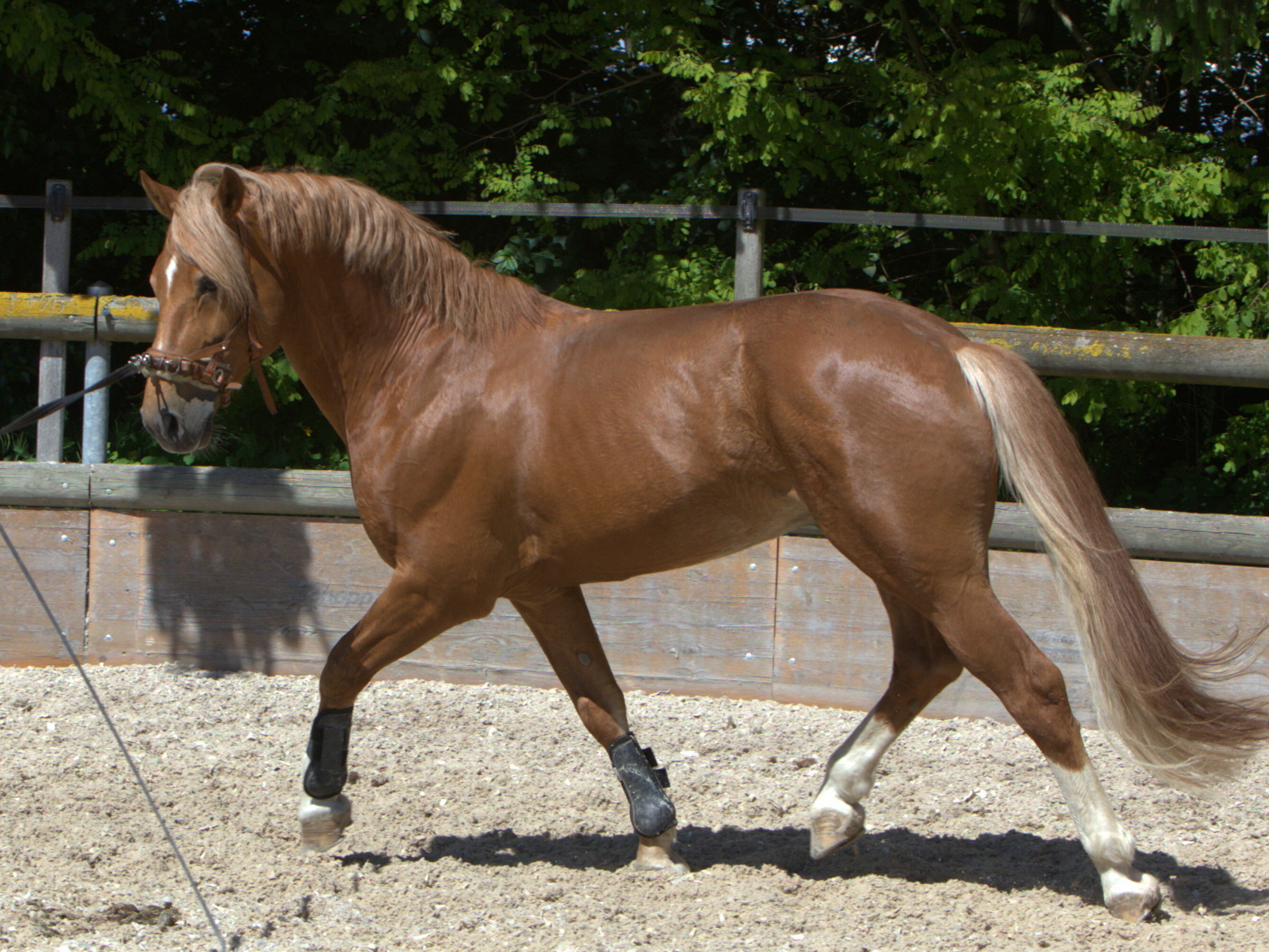

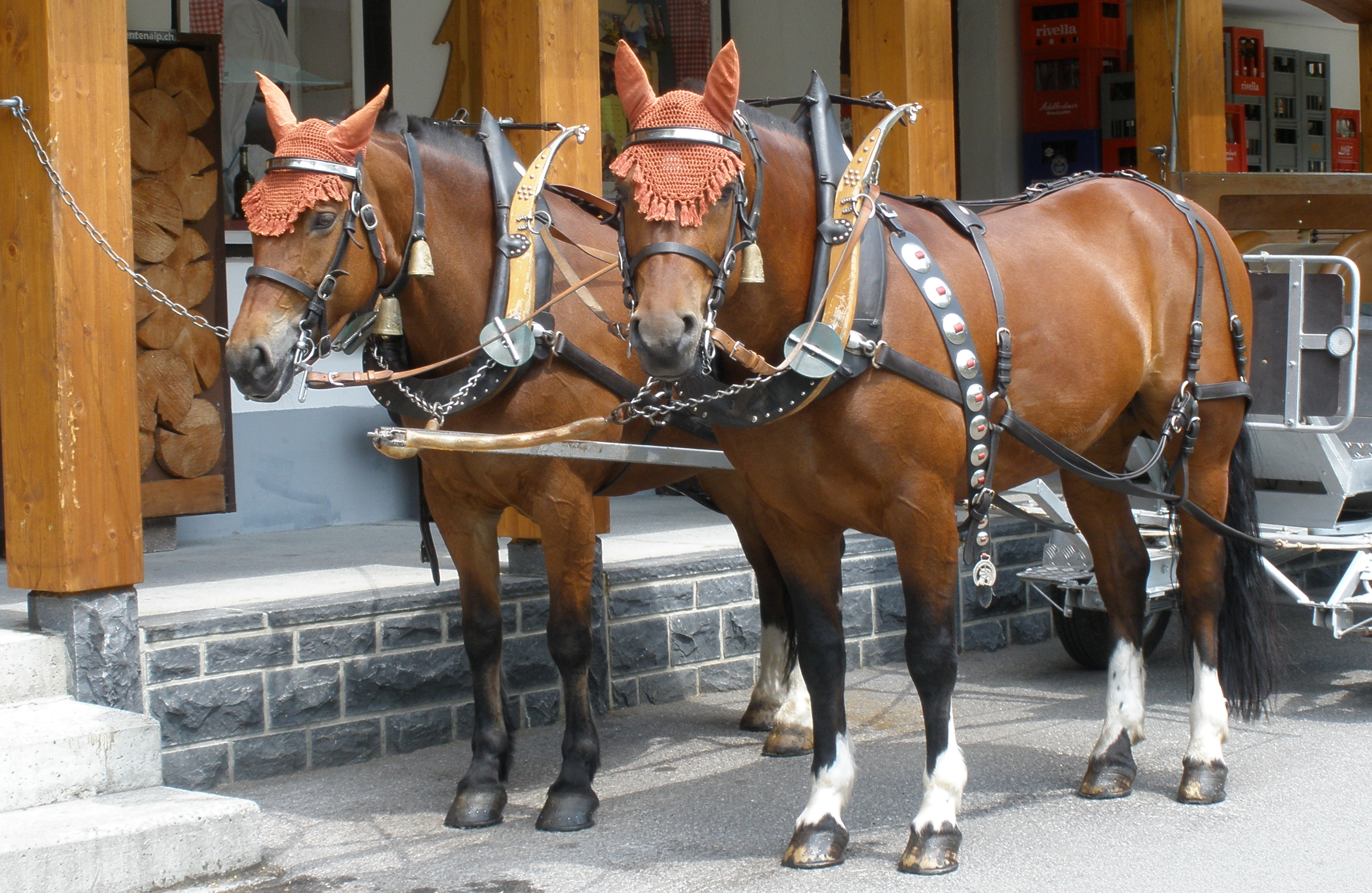
- Conservation status: FAO (2007): not at risk; DAD-IS (2023): at risk/endangered-maintained
- Other names: Franches-Montagnes; Franc-Montagnard; Cheval du Jura; Jura
- Country of origin: Switzerland
- Distribution: Switzerland; Belgium; France
- Use: driving; riding

Traits
- Weight: 550–650 kg
- Height: 147–155 cm
- Colour: usually bay, less often chestnut; rarely other colours

Breed standards
- Schweizerischer Freibergerverband (in German)

The Freiberger or Franches-Montagnes is a Swiss breed of horse of light draught type. It originates in the Canton of Jura in north-western Switzerland, and is named for the Freiberge or Franches-Montagnes District in the south of that canton. It is widely distributed in Switzerland, and is also present in France and Belgium.

It was formerly used principally as a farm horse or by the Swiss army; it is now used mainly for driving and riding. The Marché Concours is an annual fair for the breed held in Saignelégier, capital of the Franches-Montagnes District.

== Characteristics ==
The Freiberger is variable in type, from a riding horse to a light draught horse conformation. Mares average 550 kg in weight and 147 cm in height at the withers; the average height and weight for stallions and geldings are 155 cm and 650 kg. The usual coat colours are bay and chestnut, with only minimal white markings.

== History ==
Farand, a stallion at the Marché-Concours des Chevaux in Saignelégier (1910s)

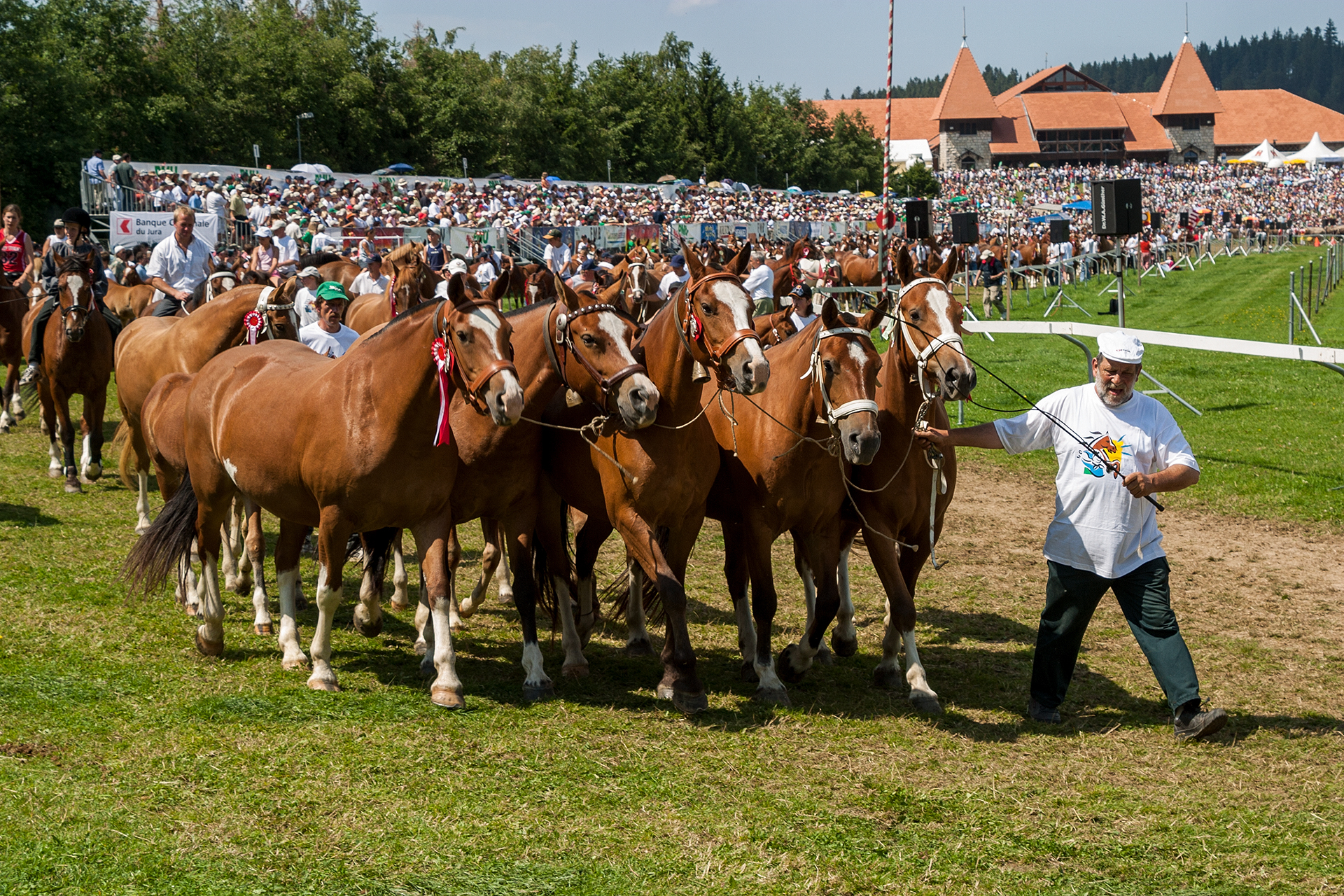
Stallions at the Marché-Concours des Chevaux of Saignelégier, 2004

The Freiberger originates in the historic Jura region of Switzerland; use of horses in agricultural work and as post-horses is documented there from about 1620.

By the early nineteenth century, there were active breeders in the district of Franches-Montagnes. In 1817, there were 4000 breeding mares. The horses were bred for use in agriculture and by the army as pack animals and artillery horses. There were imports of Anglo-Normans in 1821, and of Hanoverian, Oldenburger and other horses from England and France in 1830, all with the aim of correcting the perceived faults of the native breed – a heavy head, a short neck and a sloping croup – although its overall build was considered good.

The name Freiberger appeared in the late nineteenth century, used for the three types of horse previously named after the districts of Franches-Montagnes, Porrentruy, and Delémont. These types were called "cheval de Jura" and later "Franches-Montagnes" regardless of the district from which they originated. They had also been known as the race welsche.

Until the early twentieth century there were named sub-types, such as the Anglo-Jura – with Thoroughbred blood - and the Normand-Jura, with some Anglo-Norman ancestry. It was only in the late twentieth century that the name (Cheval des) Franches-Montagnes became official. The Marché-Concours des Chevaux in Saignelégier, a combined show, race and market dedicated to the breed, has been held annually since 1897.

Some cross-breeding with imported Swedish Warmblood stock took place in the 1960s.

A stud-book was established in 1960. It was closed to any external admixture in 1997. In the same year a breed association, the Schweizerischer Freibergerverband or Fédération suisse d’élevage du cheval de la race des Franches-Montagnes, was established.

Although the Freiberger breed is not at risk, with an estimated total population in 2017 of about 30000, of which approximately 25000 were in Switzerland, the original type – those with 2% or less of foreign blood – is endangered. An interest group for the preservation of this stock was formed in 1996 as the Interessengemeinschaft zur Erhaltung des Original Freiberger Pferdes or Communauté d’intérêt pour le maintien du cheval originel des Franches-Montagnes. In 1999 the total number of such horses was decreasing rapidly, with a remaining stock of about 300 mares and 30 stallions. In 2003 a conservation programme for the original type was established by the interest group, in collaboration with ProSpecieRara and with the Swiss National Stud Farm at Avenches.

== Use ==
The traditional uses were as a draught horse for agricultural work, or as a military horse, either as a saddle horse or as a pack animal. In the twenty-first century it is used both as a riding mount and for driving.
