= List of horse breeds in DAD-IS =

This is a list of all the horse breeds in the DAD-IS, the Domestic Animal Diversity Information System, a database of the Food and Agriculture Organization of the United Nations. In 2024 there were approximately 1600 horse breed entries, reported by about 130 countries. The breed names are those held in the database, and thus reflect the diversity between the various reporting countries; although for some breeds, there is a transboundary name available on record. Intentionally, no further attempt has been made to link, unify, rationalise or translate them. One spelling error has been corrected.

The list can be sorted alphabetically by breed, which allows the geographical range of a breed such as the Morgan to be seen. It is also text-searchable, which may help find all entries for, say, the Mérens.

== Breeds ==
The fourth version of the DAD-IS was launched on 21 November 2017 and the horse breeds listed in it were:

Reporting Country	Breed Name	Transboundary Name
Afghanistan	Buzkashi	
Afghanistan	Dawand	
Afghanistan	Herati	
Afghanistan	Kohband	
Afghanistan	Mazari	
Afghanistan	Qatgani	
Afghanistan	Qazal	
Afghanistan	Samand	
Afghanistan	Tooraq	
Afghanistan	Waziri	Waziri
Afghanistan	Yabu	Yabu
Afghanistan	Yargha	
Albania	Arab	Arab
Albania	Comune	
Albania	Haflinger	Haflinger
Albania	Nonius	Nonius
Algeria	Arabe Barbe	West African Barb
Algeria	Barbe	Barb
Argentina	Bagual	
Argentina	Crioulo	Argentine Criollo
Argentina	Falabella Pony	Falabella Pony
Australia	American Saddlebred	American Saddlebred
Australia	Andalusian	Andalusian
Australia	Appaloosa	Appaloosa
Australia	Australian Brumby	
Australia	Australian Draught Horse	
Australia	Australian Pony	
Australia	Australian Stock Horse	
Australia	Australian Walker	
Australia	Belgian Draught	Belgian Draft
Australia	Belgian Warmblood	Belgian Warmblood
Australia	Brumbie	
Australia	Caspian	Caspian
Australia	Cleveland Bay	Cleveland Bay
Australia	Clydesdale	Clydesdale
Australia	Coffin Bay Pony	
Australia	Connemara	Connemara Pony
Australia	Dales	Dales Pony
Australia	Danish Warmblood	Danish Warmblood
Australia	Dartmoor	Dartmoor Pony
Australia	Egyptian Arabian	Arab
Australia	English Arabian	Arab
Australia	English Riding Pony	
Australia	English Spotted Pony	
Australia	Exmoor	Exmoor Pony
Australia	Falabella	Falabella Pony
Australia	Fjord	Norwegian Fjord
Australia	French Warmblood	
Australia	Friesian	Friesian
Australia	German Warmblood	
Australia	Greenbank Army	
Australia	Guy Fawkes River National Park Brumby	
Australia	Hackney	Hackney
Australia	Hackney Pony	Hackney Pony
Australia	Hafflinger	Haflinger
Australia	Hannovarian	Hanoverian
Australia	Highland	Highland Pony
Australia	Icelandic	Iceland Pony
Australia	Irish Draught	Irish Draught
Australia	Irish Sporthorse	
Australia	Kosciusko Brumby	
Australia	Lippizaner	Lippizaner
Australia	Lusitano	Lusitao
Australia	Miniature Horse	
Australia	Miniature Pony	
Australia	Morgan	
Australia	Namagdi National Park Brumby	
Australia	New Forest	New Forest Pony
Australia	Oldenburger	Oldenburg
Australia	Palamino	Palomino
Australia	Palouse	
Australia	Percheron	Percheron
Australia	Polish Arabian	Arab
Australia	Quarterhorse	Quarter Horse
Australia	Shetland	Shetland Pony
Australia	Shire	Shire
Australia	Standardbred	American Trotter
Australia	Suffolk Punch	Suffolk
Australia	Swedish Warmblood	Swedish Warmblood
Australia	Tennessee Walking Horse	Tennessee Walking Horse
Australia	Thoroughbred	Thoroughbred
Australia	Timor Pony	
Australia	Waler	
Australia	Warmblood	
Australia	Welsh Mountain Pony	Welsh Pony
Austria	Altösterreichisches Warmblut	Furioso-Northstar
Austria	Haflinger	Haflinger
Austria	Huzule	Hutsul
Austria	Lipizzaner	Lipitsa
Austria	Noriker	Noriker
Austria	Pinkafeld	Pinkafö
Austria	Quarter Horse	Quarter Horse
Austria	Shagya-Araber	Shagya Arab
Austria	Vollblutaraber	Arab
Austria	Österreichisches Warmblut	
Azerbaijan	Dilbaz	
Azerbaijan	Garabakh	Karabakh
Azerbaijan	Guba	
Azerbaijan	Lower Caucasus	Lower Caucasus
Azerbaijan	Shirvan	
Bangladesh	Bangladesh native horse	
Bangladesh	Rajshahi Pony	
Belarus	Belorusskaya	
Belarus	Latvian Draught	
Belarus	Lithuanian Cart	
Belarus	Polesskaya	
Belarus	Russian Trotter	Russian Trotter
Belarus	Tory	
Belarus	Trakenen	Trakehner
Belgium	Appaloosa	Appaloosa
Belgium	Arabe	Arab
Belgium	Arabo Friese Paard	
Belgium	Baudet de Poitou	Breton
Belgium	Belgisch Warmbloedpaard	Belgian Warmblood
Belgium	Belgische Rijpony	
Belgium	Boulonnais	Boulonnais
Belgium	Bretoens trekpaard	Breton
Belgium	Cheval Barbe	Barb
Belgium	Cheval Camarque	
Belgium	Cheval de Sport Belge	Belgian Sport Horse
Belgium	Cheval de Trait Ardennais	Belgian Draft
Belgium	Cheval de Trait Belge	Belgian Draft
Belgium	Cheval selle français	French Saddlebred
Belgium	Cob Normand	Norman Cob
Belgium	Connemara Pony	Connemara Pony
Belgium	Dartmoor Pony	Dartmoor Pony
Belgium	Fjord	Fjord
Belgium	Franches-Montagnes	Freiberger
Belgium	Friese Paard	Friesian
Belgium	Haflinger	Haflinger
Belgium	Iceland Pony	Iceland Pony
Belgium	Irish Cob	
Belgium	Lipizzan	Lipitsa
Belgium	Lusitanien	Lusitanian
Belgium	Miniature	
Belgium	Miniatuurpaard	Caspian
Belgium	New-Forest Pony	New Forest Pony
Belgium	PR Espagnol	Pura Raza Espanola
Belgium	Palomino	Palomino
Belgium	Poney Highland	Breton
Belgium	Poney mérens	Merens Pony
Belgium	Pur-Sang Anglais	Thoroughbred
Belgium	Quarter Horse	Quarter Horse
Belgium	Shetland Pony	Shetland Pony
Belgium	Tinker	Tinker
Belgium	Trotteur Belge	
Belgium	Tuigpaard	Tuigpaard
Belgium	Vlaamse Paard	Flamand
Belgium	Welsh Pony	Welsh Pony
Belgium	Zangersheide	
Benin	Koto-Koli Pony	Koto-Koli Pony
Bhutan	Boeta	
Bhutan	Haflinger	Haflinger
Bhutan	Merak Saktenpata	
Bhutan	Sharta	Bhotia Pony
Bhutan	Yuta	
Bolivia	Criollo Altiplánico	
Bolivia	Criollo Oriental	
Bolivia	Pantanero	Pantanero
Bolivia	Sunicho	
Bolivia	cuarto de milla	Quarter Horse
Bosnia and Herzegovina	Barut	
Bosnia and Herzegovina	Bosnian Mountain	Bosnian Pony
Bosnia and Herzegovina	Busa Pony	
Bosnia and Herzegovina	Gazal	
Bosnia and Herzegovina	Glasinacki	
Bosnia and Herzegovina	Lenkoran	
Bosnia and Herzegovina	Lipizzaner	Lipitsa
Bosnia and Herzegovina	Misko	
Bosnia and Herzegovina	Podveleski	
Bosnia and Herzegovina	Sabih	
Bosnia and Herzegovina	Siglavi	
Botswana	Arabian	Arab
Botswana	Boerperd	Boer
Botswana	Hanoverian	Hanoverian
Botswana	Nooitgedachter	Nooitgedacht Pony
Botswana	Quarter Horse	Quarter Horse
Botswana	Thoroughbred	Thoroughbred
Botswana	Tswana	
Botswana	Welsh Pony	Welsh Pony
Brazil	Appaloosa	Appaloosa
Brazil	Arabian	Arab
Brazil	Baixadeiro	
Brazil	Brasileiro de Hipismo	
Brazil	Breton	Breton
Brazil	Campeiro	
Brazil	Campolina	
Brazil	Crioulo	
Brazil	Lavradeiro	
Brazil	Lusitano	Lusitanian
Brazil	Mangalarga	Mangalarga
Brazil	Mangalarga Marchador	
Brazil	Marajoara	
Brazil	Morgan	Morgan
Brazil	Nordestino	
Brazil	Paint	American Paint
Brazil	Pantaneiro	
Brazil	Percheron	Percheron
Brazil	Piquira Pônei	Pony
Brazil	Purebred Spanish	Purebred Spanish
Brazil	Puruca	
Brazil	Quarter Horse	Quarter Horse
Brazil	Thoroughbred	Thoroughbred
Brazil	Trotter	
Bulgaria	Bulgarian Heavy Draught	
Bulgaria	Bulgarian sport horse	
Bulgaria	Danubian horse	
Bulgaria	Deli-Orman	
Bulgaria	Eastbulgarian Horse	
Bulgaria	Gidran	Gidran
Bulgaria	Haflinger	Haflinger
Bulgaria	Karakachan horse	
Bulgaria	Pleven Horse	
Bulgaria	Purebred Arabian horse	Arab
Bulgaria	Rila Mountain	
Bulgaria	Shagya-Arabian Horse	Shagya Arab
Bulgaria	Shetland pony	Shetland Pony
Bulgaria	Stara Planina	
Bulgaria	Thoroughbred	Thoroughbred
Bulgaria	Trakehner	
Bulgaria	Trotter horse	
Burkina Faso	Bobo	
Burkina Faso	Mossi	
Burkina Faso	Percheron	Percheron
Burkina Faso	Yagha	
Cambodia	Cambodian	
Canada	Alberta Wild Horse	
Canada	American Saddlebred	American Saddle Horse
Canada	Anglo-Normand	Norman Cob
Canada	Appaloosa	Appaloosa
Canada	Arabian	Arab
Canada	Belgian	Belgian Draft
Canada	Canadian	Canadian
Canada	Canadian Warmblood	
Canada	Cleveland Bay	Cleveland Bay
Canada	Clydesdale	Clydesdale
Canada	Connemara Pony	Connemara Pony
Canada	Dales Pony	Dales
Canada	Dartmoor Pony	Dartmoor Pony
Canada	Exmoor Pony	Exmoor Pony
Canada	Fell Pony	Fell Pony
Canada	Fjord	Fjord
Canada	Hackney	Hackney
Canada	Hackney Pony	Hackney Pony
Canada	Halflinger	Haflinger
Canada	Highland Pony	Highland Pony
Canada	Icelandic	Iceland Pony
Canada	Irish Draught	Irish Draught
Canada	Lac La Croix Indian Pony	
Canada	Lipizzanner	Lipitsa
Canada	Miniature Horse	
Canada	Morgan	Morgan
Canada	New Forest	New Forest Pony
Canada	Newfoundland Pony	
Canada	Noriker	Noric
Canada	Paint	American Paint
Canada	Paso Fino	Paso Fino
Canada	Percheron	Percheron
Canada	Peruvian	
Canada	Quarter Horse	Quarter Horse
Canada	Sable Island Horse	
Canada	Shetland Pony	Shetland Pony
Canada	Shire	Shire
Canada	Canadian Sport Horse	
Canada	Standardbred	
Canada	Suffolk Punch	Suffolk
Canada	Tennessee Walking	Tennessee Walking Horse
Canada	Thoroughbred	Thoroughbred
Canada	Trakehner	Trakehner
Canada	Viking	
Canada	Welsh Cob Pony	Welsh Pony
Central African Republic	West African Dongola	West African Dongola
Chad	Bahr-El-Ghazal	
Chad	Barbe-Arabe	West African Barb
Chad	Dongola	West African Dongola
Chad	Poney du Logone	
Chile	Ardenés	Belgian Draft
Chile	Belga	Belgian Draft
Chile	Caballo de Pura Raza Chilena	
Chile	Criollo chilote	
Chile	Cuarto de Milla	Quarter Horse
Chile	Fina sangre francés	
Chile	Fina sangre inglés	
Chile	Hackney	Hackney
Chile	Hanoverano	Hanoverian
Chile	Holsteiner	Holstein
Chile	Oldenburger	Oldenburg
Chile	Percherón	Percheron
Chile	Puno Pony	
Chile	Árabe	Arab
China	Achal-Teke	Akhal-Teke
China	Ardennes	Belgian Draft
China	Barkol	
China	Bohai	
China	Bose	
China	Bose - Baise Pony	
China	Chaidamu	
China	Chakouyi	
China	Datong	
China	Don	Don
China	Erlunchun	
China	Ganzi	
China	Guanzhong	
China	Guizhou	
China	Heihe	
China	Heilongjiang	
China	Henan Light Draught	
China	Hequ	
China	Iyi	
China	Jianchang	
China	Jilin	
China	Jinjiang	
China	Jinzhou	
China	Kabardin	Kabarda
China	Kazakh	Kazakh
China	Kerqin	
China	Lichuan	
China	Mongolian	Mongolian
China	Mongolian - Ujumqin	
China	New Lijiang	
China	Ningqiang	
China	Orlov Trotter	Orlov Trotter
China	Sanhe	
China	Shandan	
China	Soviet Heavy Draught	Soviet Heavy Draft
China	Thoroughbred	Thoroughbred
China	Tibetan	Tibetan Pony
China	Tibetan - Sikang Pony	
China	Tieling Draught	
China	Wenshan	
China	Xiangfen	
China	Xilinguole	
China	Xinihe	
China	Yanqi	
China	Yiwu	
China	Yongning	
China	Yunnan - Lijiang	
China	Yunnan pony	
China	Yushu	
China	Zhangbei	
China	Zhongdian	
Colombia	Asno	
Colombia	Criollo Colombiano	
Colombia	Paso Fino Colombiano	Paso Fino
Colombia	Trocha Pura Colombiana	
Colombia	Trocha y Galope Reunido Colombiano	
Cook Islands	local horse	Local horse
Costa Rica	Caballo Costarricense de Paso	Costarricense de Paso
Croatia	Akhal-Teke	Akhal-Teke
Croatia	American quarter horse	
Croatia	Araber	
Croatia	Arabian horse	Arab
Croatia	Arabian purebreed	
Croatia	Bosnian horse	
Croatia	Croatian Coldblood	Croatian Coldblood horse
Croatia	Croatian Posavina horse	
Croatia	Croatian trotter	
Croatia	Frisian	Friesian
Croatia	Gidran	Gidran
Croatia	Haflinger	Haflinger
Croatia	Hanoveran	Andalusian
Croatia	Hanoverian	Hanoverian
Croatia	Holstein	Holstein
Croatia	Konik	Kabarda
Croatia	Krk Island pony	
Croatia	Lippizan	
Croatia	Međimurje horse	Altai
Croatia	Murinsulaner horse	Murinsulaner horse
Croatia	Nonius	Nonius
Croatia	Oldenburg	Oldenburg
Croatia	Paint horse	Palomino
Croatia	Shagya-Arab	Shagya Arab
Croatia	Thoroughbred	Thoroughbred
Croatia	Trakehner	Trakehner
Cuba	Appaloosa	Appaloosa
Cuba	Belga	Belgian Draft
Cuba	Caballo Cubano de Paso	
Cuba	Criollo de trote	
Cuba	Español	Purebred Spanish
Cuba	Morgan	Morgan
Cuba	Patibarcino	
Cuba	Percheron	Percheron
Cuba	Pinto cubano	American Paint
Cuba	Ponny Shetland	Shetland Pony
Cuba	Ponny Welch	
Cuba	Pura Sangre Inglés	Thoroughbred
Cuba	Quarter horse	Quarter Horse
Cuba	Árabe	Arab
Cyprus	Alogo kypriakis ektrofis	
Cyprus	Katharoemo Alogo	Thoroughbred
Czech Republic	Achal-Teke	Akhal-Teke
Czech Republic	Anglicky plnokrevnik	English Thoroughbred
Czech Republic	Arabsky kun	Arab
Czech Republic	Ceskomoravsky belgicky kun	
Czech Republic	Cesky sportovni pony	Czech Riding Pony
Czech Republic	Cesky teplokrevnik	Czech Warmblood
Czech Republic	Hafling	Haflinger
Czech Republic	Huculsky kun	Hutsul
Czech Republic	Irský cob	Irish Cob
Czech Republic	Klusak	Trotter Horse
Czech Republic	Kun Kinsky	
Czech Republic	Lipicky kun	Lipitsa
Czech Republic	Moravsky teplokrevnik	
Czech Republic	Norik	Noric
Czech Republic	Shagya Arab	Shagya Arab
Czech Republic	Shetland Pony	Shetland Pony
Czech Republic	Slezsky norik	Silesian Norik
Czech Republic	Slovensky teplokrevnik	Slovak Warmblood Horse
Czech Republic	Starokladrubsky kun	Old Kladruby Horse
Czech Republic	Traken	Trakehner
Czech Republic	Velsska plemena pony	Welsh Pony
Denmark	Belgier	Belgian Draft
Denmark	Dansk Varmblod	Danish Warmblood
Denmark	Den Islandske Hest	Islandic Horse
Denmark	Den Jydske Hest	Jutland Horse
Denmark	Fjordhest	Fjord
Denmark	Frederiksborgheste	Frederiksborg Horse
Denmark	Fuldblod	Thoroughbred
Denmark	Knabstrupper	Knabstrupper
Denmark	New Forest	New Forest Pony
Denmark	Oldenborger	Oldenburg
Denmark	Ox-Araber	
Denmark	Shetland Pony	Shetland Pony
Denmark	Trakehner	Trakehner
Denmark	Travere	
Denmark	Welsh	Welsh Pony
Dominican Republic	Criollo	
Dominican Republic	Media sangre	
Dominican Republic	Paso Fino	Paso Fino
Dominican Republic	Quarto de Milla	Quarter Horse
Egypt	Arabian	Arab
Egypt	Baladi Egyptian	
El Salvador	Apaloosa	Appaloosa
El Salvador	Arabe	Arab
El Salvador	Azteca	Azteca
El Salvador	Criollo	
El Salvador	Cuarto de Milla	Quarter Horse
El Salvador	Española	Purebred Spanish
El Salvador	Inglés	Thoroughbred
El Salvador	Lusitano	Lusitanian
El Salvador	Peruano de paso	Costeño
El Salvador	Pony	
Eritrea	Dongola	Dongola
Estonia	Eesti hobune	Estonian Native Horse
Estonia	Eesti raskeveohobune	Estonian Heavy Draught
Estonia	Tori hobune	Tori Horse (Toric)
Estonia	Trakener	Trakehner
Ethiopia	Abyssinian	
Ethiopia	Bale	
Ethiopia	Borana	
Ethiopia	Horro	
Ethiopia	Kafa	
Ethiopia	Kundido feral	
Ethiopia	Selale	
Ethiopia	Wilwal	
Faeroe Islands	Færøsk hest	
Finland	Angloarabialainen täysiverihevonen	Anglo-Arab
Finland	Arabialainen täysverihevonen	Arab
Finland	Connemara Pony	Connemara Pony
Finland	Englantilainen täysverinen	Thoroughbred
Finland	Finnish Riding Pony	
Finland	Islannin Hevonen	Iceland Pony
Finland	Lämminverinen Ravihevonen	
Finland	New Forest Pony	New Forest Pony
Finland	Riding Horse	
Finland	Russponi	Gotland Pony
Finland	Shetlannin poni	Shetland Pony
Finland	Small horse	
Finland	Suomalainen puoliverihevonen	Finnish warmblood
Finland	Suomenhevonen	Finnhorse
Finland	Welsh	Welsh Pony
Finland	Workhorse	
Finland	vuonohevonen	Fjord
France	AQPS	French Chaser
France	Akhal-Teke	Akhal-Teke
France	Anglo-Arabe	Anglo-Arab
France	Appaloosa	Appaloosa
France	Arabe	Arab
France	Ardennais	Belgian Draft
France	Augeron	
France	Auxois	Auxois
France	Barbe	Barb
France	Berrichon	
France	Boulonnais	Boulonnais
France	Bourbonnais	Boulonnais
France	Breton	Breton
France	Camargue	Camargue
France	Castillonnais	
France	Cheval Corse	
France	Cheval de race Auvergne	
France	Cheval de sport Anglo-normand	
France	Cob normand	Norman Cob
France	Comtois	Comtois
France	Connemara	Connemara Pony
France	Crème	
France	Dartmoor	Dartmoor Pony
France	Fjord	Fjord
France	Franches-Montagnes	
France	Frison	Friesian
France	Haflinger	Haflinger
France	Henson	
France	Highland	Highland Pony
France	Islandais	Iceland Pony
France	Landais	Landais
France	Lipizzan	Lipitsa
France	Loire	
France	Lusitanien	Lusitanian
France	Maine	
France	Mulassier du Poitou	
France	Mérens	Merens Pony
France	New Forest	New Forest Pony
France	Nivernais	
France	Paint Horse	American Paint
France	Percheron	Percheron
France	Poitevin	
France	Poney français de selle	
France	Pottok	Pottok
France	Pur sang	Thoroughbred
France	Quarter Horse	Quarter Horse
France	Saône-et-Loire	
France	Selle français	French Saddlebred
France	Shagya	Shagya Arab
France	Shetland	Shetland Pony
France	Trait du nord	Northern Ardennes
France	Trakehner	Trakehner
France	Trotteur français	French Trotter
France	Welsh	Welsh Pony
Georgia	Anglo-Kabarda	Anglo-Kabarda
Georgia	Dagestan Pony	Dagestan Pony
Georgia	Javakhuri Harness Horse	
Georgia	Kabarda	Kabarda
Georgia	Karachai	Karachai
Georgia	Megruli Horse	
Georgia	Tersk	Tersk
Georgia	Tushuri Horse	
Germany	Achal-Tekkiner	Akhal-Teke
Germany	Aegidienberger	
Germany	Alt-Württemberger	
Germany	American Curly Horse	Curly Horse
Germany	American Miniature Horse	American Miniatur Horse
Germany	American Paint Horse	
Germany	American Quarter Horse	Quarter Horse
Germany	American Shetland Pony	
Germany	Andalusier	Andalusian
Germany	Anglo-Kabardiner	
Germany	Appaloosa	Appaloosa
Germany	Araber	Arab
Germany	Araber (Shagyy- / Anglo- / Araber)	Shagya Arab
Germany	Araber-Berber	Arab
Germany	Arabisches Halbblut	
Germany	Ardenner	Ardennes
Germany	Arravani	
Germany	Bardigiano	
Germany	Barock-Reitpferd	
Germany	Bayerisches Warmblut	Bavarian Warmblood
Germany	Belgian Draft Horse	
Germany	Belgisches Kaltblut	Anglo-Kabarda
Germany	Berber	Barb
Germany	Black and White Frisian	
Germany	Bosniake	Bosnian
Germany	Boulonnais	Boulonnais
Germany	Brabanter	
Germany	Brandenburger Warmblut	Brandenburg
Germany	Bretone	Breton
Germany	British Spotted Pony	
Germany	Budjonny	Budyonny
Germany	Caballo Falabella	Falabella Pony
Germany	Camargue	Camargue
Germany	Cob Normand	Norman Cob
Germany	Comtois	Comtois
Germany	Connemara Pony	Connemara Pony
Germany	Criollo	Criollo
Germany	Cruzado	
Germany	Cruzado Iberico	
Germany	Cruzado Portugues	
Germany	Curly Horse	
Germany	Dales Pony	Dales
Germany	Dartmoor Pony	Dartmoor Pony
Germany	Deutscher Falbe	
Germany	Deutscher Tigerschecke	
Germany	Deutsches Classic Pony	
Germany	Deutsches Partbred Shetland Pony	
Germany	Deutsches Pferd	
Germany	Deutsches Pinto Barockpferd	
Germany	Deutsches Polopferd	
Germany	Deutsches Reitpony	German Riding Pony
Germany	Deutsches Sportpferd	
Germany	Drumhorse	
Germany	Dülmener	
Germany	Edelbluthaflinger	
Germany	Europäischer Tigerschecke	
Germany	Europäisches Appaloosa-Pony	
Germany	Europäisches Westernpferd	
Germany	Exmoor Pony	Exmoor Pony
Germany	Fell Pony	Fell Pony
Germany	Finnpferd	Finnhorse
Germany	Fjordpferd	Fjord
Germany	Frederiksborger	
Germany	Freiberger	
Germany	Friesenpferd	Friesian
Germany	Hackney	Hackney
Germany	Haflinger	Haflinger
Germany	Hannoveraner Halbblut	
Germany	Hannoveraner Warmblut	Hanoverian
Germany	Hannoversches Kaltblut Schleswiger Ursprungs	
Germany	Hessisches Warmblut	Hessen
Germany	Highland Pony	Highland Pony
Germany	Hispano-Araber	Hispano-Arabe
Germany	Holsteiner Warmblut	Holstein
Germany	Huzule	Hutsul
Germany	Internationales Oldenburger Springpferd	
Germany	Irish Cob	
Germany	Irish Cob Crossbred	
Germany	Islandpferd	Iceland Pony
Germany	Kabardiner	Kabarda
Germany	Karabagh	Karabakh
Germany	Karatschaewer	
Germany	Kiger Mustang	
Germany	Kinsky Pferd	
Germany	Kladruber	Kladruby
Germany	Kleines Deutsches Pony	
Germany	Kleines Deutsches Reitpferd	
Germany	Knabstrupper	Knabstrupper
Germany	Konik	Polish Konik
Germany	Leonharder	
Germany	Leutstettener Pferd	Leutstettener
Germany	Lewitzer	
Germany	Lipizzaner	Lipitsa
Germany	Lusitano	Lusitanian
Germany	Mangalarga Marchador	Mangalarga
Germany	Maremmano	
Germany	Mecklenburger Warmblut	Mecklenburg
Germany	Merens	Merens Pony
Germany	Missouri Fox Trotter	
Germany	Morgan Horse	Morgan
Germany	Nederlands Appaloosa Pony	
Germany	Nederlands Mini Paarden	
Germany	New Forest Pony	New Forest Pony
Germany	Niederländisches Kaltblut	
Germany	Noriker	Noric
Germany	Oldenburger Warmblut	Oldenburg
Germany	Orlow	Orlov Trotter
Germany	Ostfriesisch-altoldenburgisches Schweres Warmblut	
Germany	Ostpreußisches Warmblut Trakehner Abstammung	
Germany	Palomino	Palomino
Germany	Paso Fino	Paso Fino
Germany	Paso Iberoamerikano	
Germany	Paso Peruano	
Germany	Paso Pferd	
Germany	Percheron	Percheron
Germany	Pfalz Ardenner Kaltblut	
Germany	Pinto	
Germany	Polo Argentino	
Germany	Pony of the Americas	
Germany	Pura Raza Espanola	
Germany	Quarab Horse	
Germany	Quarter Pony	
Germany	Rassegruppe Schweres Warmblut	
Germany	Rassegruppe der Deutschen Reitpferde	
Germany	Raza Iberica - Portugiesisches Sportpferd	
Germany	Raza Menorquina	
Germany	Rheinisch Deutsches Kaltblut	Rheinish Westphalian Draught Horse
Germany	Rheinisches Reitpferd	Rhenish Warmblood
Germany	Rottaler	Rottal
Germany	Sachsen-Anhaltiner Warmblut	
Germany	Saddlebred	American Saddle Horse
Germany	Schleswiger Kaltblut	Schleswig Coldblood
Germany	Schwarzwälder Kaltblut	
Germany	Schweres Warmblut Dänemark	
Germany	Senner	Senne
Germany	Shetland Pony	Shetland Pony
Germany	Shire Horse	Shire
Germany	Silver Dapple	
Germany	Sächsisch-Thüringisches Schweres Warmblut	
Germany	Sächsisches Warmblut	
Germany	Süddeutsches Kaltblut	
Germany	Tarpan	Tarpan
Germany	Tennessee Walking Horse	Tennessee Walking Horse
Germany	Tersker	Tersk
Germany	Thüringer Warmblut	
Germany	Tinker	Tinker
Germany	Traber	
Germany	Trait du Nord	
Germany	Tuigparden	Tuigpaard
Germany	Tölter	
Germany	Ungarisches Kaltblut	
Germany	Vollblut	
Germany	Vollblutaraber	
Germany	Warlander	
Germany	Warmblutschecken	
Germany	Welsh Pony und Cob	Welsh Pony
Germany	Westfälisches Reitpferd	Westphalian Warmblood
Germany	Württemberger Warmblut	
Germany	Zweibrücker Warmblut	
Germany	Österreichisches Kaltblut	
Ghana	Arab Barb	West African Barb
Ghana	Chadian	
Ghana	West African Pony	
Greece	Aglikos Katharohaemos	Thoroughbred
Greece	Andravida	
Greece	Crete	
Greece	Pindos	
Greece	Pineia	Pineia, Geogalidiko, Georgaludiko
Greece	Skyros Pony	Skyros Pony
Greece	Thessalia	
Guatemala	Americano de Silla	American Saddle Horse
Guatemala	Apaloosa	Appaloosa
Guatemala	Costarricense de Paso	Costarricense de Paso
Guatemala	Criollo	
Guatemala	Cuarto de Milla	Quarter Horse
Guatemala	Española	Purebred Spanish
Guatemala	Frisona	Friesian
Guatemala	Frizona	Friesian
Guatemala	Iberoamericana	Iberoamericana
Guatemala	Inglés Pura Sangre	Thoroughbred
Guatemala	Paso Fino	Paso Fino
Guatemala	Peruano de paso	
Guatemala	Pinto	American Paint
Guatemala	Pony	
Guatemala	Árabe	Arab
Guyana	American Thoroughbred	Thoroughbred
Guyana	Creole	Creole
Guyana	Quarter	Quarter Horse
Haiti	Chwal	Cheval
Haiti	Créole	Creole
Honduras	Americano de silla	American Saddle Horse
Honduras	Angloárabe	Anglo-Arab
Honduras	Apaloosa	Appaloosa
Honduras	Atheland	
Honduras	Caballo de paso	Costeño
Honduras	Caballo de trote	
Honduras	Colombiano	
Honduras	Costarricense de Paso	Costarricense de Paso
Honduras	Criollo Hondureño	
Honduras	Criollo de paso	
Honduras	Cuarto de Milla	Quarter Horse
Honduras	Española	Purebred Spanish
Honduras	Hackney	Hackney
Honduras	Hispano árabe	Hispano-Arabe
Honduras	Iberoamericano	Iberoamericano
Honduras	Ingles pura raza	Thoroughbred
Honduras	Morgan	Morgan
Honduras	OISK	
Honduras	Palamino	Palomino
Honduras	Percheron	Percheron
Honduras	Peruano de paso	Costeño
Honduras	Pinto	American Paint
Honduras	Pony	
Honduras	Shetland	Shetland Pony
Honduras	Trote de andar	
Honduras	Warmbloed	
Honduras	Welsh	Welsh Pony
Honduras	Árabe	Arab
Hungary	Akhal teke	Akhal-Teke
Hungary	Appaloosa	
Hungary	Arabian Thorough Bred	Arab
Hungary	Bardigiano pony	
Hungary	Connemara	Connemara Pony
Hungary	English Thorough Bred	Thoroughbred
Hungary	Fjord	Fjord
Hungary	Fríz	Friesian
Hungary	Furisoso-North Star	Furioso-Northstar
Hungary	Gidrán	Gidran
Hungary	Hafling	Haflinger
Hungary	Hucul	Hutsul
Hungary	Hungarian Sport Horse	
Hungary	Izlandi	Iceland Pony
Hungary	Kisbéri-Félvér	Kisber Halfbred
Hungary	Lipicai	Lipitsa
Hungary	Magyar Hidegvéru	
Hungary	Nóniusz	Nonius
Hungary	Quarter	Quarter Horse
Hungary	Shagya Arab	Shagya Arab
Hungary	Shetland Pony	Shetland Pony
Hungary	Trotter	
Hungary	Welsh Pony	Welsh Pony
Iceland	Islenski Hesturinn	Icelandic Horse
India	Arab	Arab
India	Bhotia Pony	Bhotia Pony
India	Chummarti	Chummarti
India	Deccani	
India	Kathiawari	
India	Manipuri Pony	
India	Marwari	
India	Spiti Pony	
India	Zaniskari Pony	
Indonesia	Bali	
Indonesia	Batak	
Indonesia	Bima	
Indonesia	Flores	
Indonesia	Gayo	
Indonesia	Horse	
Indonesia	Jawa	
Indonesia	Kuningan	
Indonesia	Lombok	
Indonesia	Makasar	
Indonesia	Minahasa	
Indonesia	Sandelwood	
Indonesia	Sumbar-Sandel-Arab	
Indonesia	Sumbawa	
Indonesia	Thoroughbred racing horse	Thoroughbred
Indonesia	kuda-Pacu Indonesia	
Iran (Islamic Republic of)	Bakhtiari	
Iran (Islamic Republic of)	Basseri	
Iran (Islamic Republic of)	Caspian	Caspian
Iran (Islamic Republic of)	Dareshuri	
Iran (Islamic Republic of)	Ebian	
Iran (Islamic Republic of)	Haddian	
Iran (Islamic Republic of)	Hamdani	Arab
Iran (Islamic Republic of)	Iranian Arab	Arab
Iran (Islamic Republic of)	Jaf	
Iran (Islamic Republic of)	Kahilan	
Iran (Islamic Republic of)	Kurdi	Kurdi
Iran (Islamic Republic of)	Persian Arab	Arab
Iran (Islamic Republic of)	Qarabagh	Karabakh
Iran (Islamic Republic of)	Qashqai	
Iran (Islamic Republic of)	Saglawi	Arab
Iran (Islamic Republic of)	Shirazi	
Iran (Islamic Republic of)	Sistani	
Iran (Islamic Republic of)	Taleshi	
Iran (Islamic Republic of)	Taropud	
Iran (Islamic Republic of)	Turkemin	
Iran (Islamic Republic of)	Yabu	Yabu
Iraq	Arab	Arab
Iraq	Kurdi	Kurdi
Ireland	Appaloosa	Appaloosa
Ireland	Arab	Arab
Ireland	Connemara Pony	Connemara Pony
Ireland	Irish Cob	Cob
Ireland	Irish Cob Part Bred	Part Bred Cob
Ireland	Irish Draught	Irish Draught
Ireland	Irish Miniature	
Ireland	Irish Piebald and Skewbald	Piebald and Skewbald
Ireland	Irish Pony	Irish Pony
Ireland	Irish Sport Horse	Irish Sport Horse
Ireland	Irish Warmblood	Irish Warmblood
Ireland	Kerry Bog Pony	Kerry Bog Pony
Ireland	Thoroughbred	Thoroughbred
Italy	Asino Baio Lucano	
Italy	Avelignese	Haflinger
Italy	Avelignese Tradizionale	
Italy	Calabrese	
Italy	Cavallino di Monterufoli	Monterufoli Pony
Italy	Cavallo Agricolo Italiano	Rapid Heavy Draft
Italy	Cavallo Bardigiano	Bardigiana
Italy	Cavallo Del Catria	
Italy	Cavallo Del Ventasso	
Italy	Cavallo Maremmano	Maremmano
Italy	Cavallo Murgese	Murgese
Italy	Cavallo Norico	Noric
Italy	Cavallo Pentro	
Italy	Cavallo Romano della Maremma Laziale	
Italy	Cavallo Sardo	Sardinian
Italy	Cavallo Siciliano	Sicilian
Italy	Cavallo anglo-arabo-sardo	Anglo-Arabo-Sarda
Italy	Cavallo della Giara	Giara Pony
Italy	Cremonese	
Italy	Delta	Delta
Italy	Italiano da Sella	
Italy	Knabstrupper	Knabstrupper
Italy	Lipizzano	Lipitsa
Italy	Maremmano tradizionale	Maremmano
Italy	Napoletano	
Italy	Persano- Salernitano	Persano
Italy	Pony dell'Esperia	Esperia Pony
Italy	Pugliese	
Italy	Puro Sangue Orientale	Thoroughbred
Italy	Quarter Horse	Quarter Horse
Italy	Salernitano	Salernitano
Italy	Samolaco	Samolaca
Italy	Sanfratellano	Sanfratellano
Italy	Sarcidano	Sarcidano
Italy	Tolfetano	Tolfetano
Italy	Trottatore Italiano	
Italy	cavallo Appenninico	cavallo Appenninico
Italy	cavallo di Merens	cavallo di Merens
Italy	romagnolo	romagnolo
Japan	Arab	Arab
Japan	Breton	Breton
Japan	Dosanko	
Japan	Kiso	
Japan	Misaki	
Japan	Miyako	
Japan	Nanbu	
Japan	Noma	
Japan	Percheron	Percheron
Japan	Thoroughbred	Thoroughbred
Japan	Tokara Pony	
Japan	Tsushima	
Japan	Yonaguni	
Jordan	Arabian	Arab
Kazakhstan	Adaev	Adaev
Kazakhstan	Akhal-Teke	Akhal-Teke
Kazakhstan	Jabe	
Kazakhstan	Karabair	Karabair
Kazakhstan	Kazakh	Kazakh
Kazakhstan	Kushum	
Kazakhstan	Kustanai	
Kazakhstan	Mugalzhar	
Korea, Republic of	Jeju Horse	
Korea, Republic of	Taejung	
Korea, Republic of	Thoroughbred	Thoroughbred
Kyrgyzstan	Don	Don
Kyrgyzstan	Kirgiz	
Kyrgyzstan	New Kirgiz	
Kyrgyzstan	Oryol	Orlov Saddle Horse
Kyrgyzstan	Russian Trotter	Russian Trotter
Kyrgyzstan	Thoroughbred riding	Thoroughbred
Lao People's Democratic Republic	Ma	
Latvia	American Trotter	American Trotter
Latvia	Arabic	Arab
Latvia	Danish Warmblood	Danish Warmblood
Latvia	Hanoverian	Hanoverian
Latvia	Holsteiner	Holsteiner
Latvia	Latvijas šķirne	Larvian breed
Latvia	Netherlands Warmblood	Dutch Warmblood
Latvia	Oldenburg	Oldenburg
Latvia	Orlov Trotter	Orlov Trotter
Latvia	Polish conics	Polish Konik
Latvia	Russian Trotter	Russian Trotter
Latvia	Thoroughbred	
Latvia	Trakehner	Trakehner
Latvia	Westfalia	Westphalian Warmblood
Lesotho	Basotho Pony	
Lesotho	Thoroughbred	Thoroughbred
Lithuania	American Trotter	American Trotter
Lithuania	Arab	Arab
Lithuania	Budiono	Budyonny
Lithuania	Hanover	Hanoverian
Lithuania	Holstein	Holstein
Lithuania	Lithuanian Heavy Draft	
Lithuania	Poni	
Lithuania	Russian Trotter	Russian Trotter
Lithuania	Thoroughbred Mounts	Thoroughbred
Lithuania	Trakenai	Trakehner
Lithuania	Zemaitukai (Modern Type)	
Lithuania	Žemaitukai	Žemaitukai
Luxembourg	American Paint	American Paint
Luxembourg	Appaloosa	Appaloosa
Luxembourg	Cheval de Trait Ardennais	Belgian Draft
Luxembourg	Cheval de selle luxembourgeois	French Saddlebred
Luxembourg	Deutsches Reitpony	
Luxembourg	Fjord	Fjord
Luxembourg	Haflinger	Haflinger
Luxembourg	Iceland Pony	Iceland Pony
Luxembourg	Irish Cob	
Luxembourg	Mini Shetland Pony	
Luxembourg	Quarter Horse	Quarter Horse
Luxembourg	Shetland Pony	Shetland Pony
Malaysia	Bajau	
Malaysia	Kuda Padi	
Mali	Arabe	Arab
Mali	Bandiagara	Bandiagara
Mali	Barbe	Barb
Mali	Beledougou	
Mali	Cheval de Nioro	
Mali	Dombi	
Mali	Dongalow	Dongola
Mali	Haoussa	Hausa
Mali	Hodh	Hodh
Mali	Poney	
Mali	Sahel	
Mali	Songhoï	
Mauritania	Arab-Barb	West African Barb
Mauritania	Arabe	Arab
Mauritania	Barbe	Barb
Mauritania	Hodh	Hodh
Mexico	Appaloosa	Appaloosa
Mexico	Azteca	Azteca
Mexico	Criollo Militar	
Mexico	Cuarto de Milla	Quarter Horse
Mexico	Español	Purebred Spanish
Mexico	Galiceno	
Mexico	Inglés	Thoroughbred
Mexico	Lusitano	Lusitanian
Mexico	Mexican Pony	
Mexico	Warmblood	
Mexico	Árabe	Arab
Moldova, Republic of	Local Moldavian	
Moldova, Republic of	Soviet Heavy Draft	Soviet Heavy Draft
Mongolia	Darkhad	
Mongolia	Galshar	
Mongolia	Jargalant	
Mongolia	Mongol Aduu	Mongolian
Mongolia	Przewalski Horse	Przewalski Horse
Mongolia	Tes	
Montenegro	Arapski konj	Arab
Montenegro	Domaci brdski konj	Mountain pony
Morocco	Barbe	Barb
Morocco	L'anglo-arabe	Anglo-Arab
Morocco	L'arabe-barbe	
Morocco	Pur-sang anglais	Thoroughbred
Morocco	Pur-sang arabe	Arab
Myanmar	Burmese	
Myanmar	Shan Pony	
Namibia	Appaloosa	Appaloosa
Namibia	Arab	Arab
Namibia	Friesian	Friesian
Namibia	Haflinger	Haflinger
Namibia	Hanoverian	Hanoverian
Namibia	Miniatures	
Namibia	Quarter Horse	Quarter Horse
Namibia	Saddlebred	
Namibia	Thoroughbred	Thoroughbred
Namibia	Welsh Pony	Welsh Pony
Nepal	Bhotia Pony	Bhotia Pony
Nepal	Chyanta	
Nepal	Jumli	
Nepal	Tanghan	Tanghan
Nepal	Tarai Pony	
Nepal	Tattu	
Nepal	Tibetan Pony	Tibetan Pony
Netherlands	Appaloosa	Appaloosa
Netherlands	Arabisch volbloed	Arab
Netherlands	Connemara Pony	Connemara Pony
Netherlands	Dartmoor Pony	Dartmoor Pony
Netherlands	Draver	Thoroughbred
Netherlands	Engelse volbloed	Thoroughbred
Netherlands	Exmoor	Exmoor Pony
Netherlands	Falabella miniatuurpaard	Falabella Pony
Netherlands	Fell pony	Fell Pony
Netherlands	Fjordenpaard	Fjord
Netherlands	Fries Paard	Friesian
Netherlands	Gelders Paard	Gelder horse / Gelderland horse
Netherlands	Groninger Paard	Groningen
Netherlands	Hackney	Hackney
Netherlands	Haflinger	Haflinger
Netherlands	Het Nederlandse Trekpaard	Belgian Draft
Netherlands	Ijslander	Iceland Pony
Netherlands	KWPN rijpaard	Dutch Warmblood
Netherlands	Kaspisch paard	Caspian
Netherlands	Konik	Polish Konik
Netherlands	Lipizzaner	Lipitsa
Netherlands	Lusitano	Lusitanian
Netherlands	Minipaard	Falabella Pony
Netherlands	Mérens paarden	Merens Pony
Netherlands	NRPS paard en NRPS pony	Anglo-Arab
Netherlands	New Forest	New Forest Pony
Netherlands	Painted Horse	American Paint
Netherlands	Przewalski	Przewalski Horse
Netherlands	Pura Raza Espanola	Purebred Spanish
Netherlands	Quarter Horse	Quarter Horse
Netherlands	Shagya	Shagya Arab
Netherlands	Shetland pony	Shetland Pony
Netherlands	Shire	Shire
Netherlands	Tinker of Ierse Cob	Tinker
Netherlands	Tuigpaard	Tuigpaard
Netherlands	Welsh and COB pony	Welsh Pony
Netherlands	Zwaar Warmbloed paard	Oldenburg
New Zealand	Arab	Arab
New Zealand	Caspian	Caspian
New Zealand	Kaimanawa ' Wild' Horse	
Nicaragua	Criollo	
Nicaragua	Cuarto de Milla	Quarter Horse
Nicaragua	Cubano de Paso	Costeño
Nicaragua	Española	Purebred Spanish
Nicaragua	Ibero	Iberoamericano
Nicaragua	Peruana	
Nicaragua	Árabe	Arab
Niger	Arewa 2	
Niger	Aréwa 1	
Niger	Soudan (G0)	
Niger	Talon (G1)	
Nigeria	Bhirum Pony	
Nigeria	Bornu	
Nigeria	Hausa	Hausa
Nigeria	Sulebawa	
Norway	Doelahest	
Norway	Fjordhest	Fjord Horse
Norway	Nordlandshest/lyngshest	
Norway	Norsk kaldblodstraver	Nordsvensk travare
Norway	Norsk varmblod	
Pakistan	Baluchi	
Pakistan	Hirzai	
Pakistan	Makra	
Pakistan	Waziri	Waziri
Papua New Guinea	Horse	
Paraguay	Appaloosa	Appaloosa
Paraguay	Arabe	Arab
Paraguay	Campolina	
Paraguay	Criollo Argentina	Argentine Criollo
Paraguay	Criollo Paraguaya	
Paraguay	Criollo Uruguaya	
Paraguay	Cuarto de Milla	Quarter Horse
Paraguay	Manga Larga	
Paraguay	Morgan	Morgan
Paraguay	Paint Horse	American Paint
Paraguay	Percheron	Percheron
Paraguay	Peruano Argentino	
Paraguay	Pony	
Paraguay	Pura sangre de Carrera	Thoroughbred
Peru	Andaluz	Andalusian
Peru	Arabe	Arab
Peru	Cimarron	
Peru	Morochuca	
Peru	Morochuco Chumbivilcano	
Peru	Percheron	Percheron
Peru	Peruano de Paso	Costeño
Peru	Ponys	
Peru	Puro Sangre de Carrera	Thoroughbred
Peru	Serrana	
Peru	Shetland	Shetland Pony
Philippines	Arabian	Arab
Philippines	Baguio light horse	
Philippines	Baguio pony	
Philippines	Miniature Horse	
Philippines	Native Racehorse	
Philippines	Philippine Pony	
Philippines	Quarter	Quarter Horse
Philippines	Tagaytay light horse	
Philippines	Tagaytay pony	
Philippines	Thoroughbred	Thoroughbred
Poland	Arden	Ardennes
Poland	Czysta Krew Arabska (oo)	Arab
Poland	Hucuł	Hutsul
Poland	Konik polski	Polish Konik
Poland	Kuc szetlandzki	Shetland Pony
Poland	Kłusak	Polish Trotter
Poland	Małopolski	
Poland	Pelna krew angielska (xx)	Thoroughbred
Poland	Polski koń szlachetny półkrwi	
Poland	Polski koń zimnokrwisty	Polish Coldblood
Poland	Sokólski	Sokolski
Poland	Sztumski	Sztumski
Poland	Tarpan	Tarpan
Poland	Traken	Polish Trakehner
Poland	Wielkopolski	
Poland	Śląski	Silesian Horse
Portugal	Garrano	
Portugal	Lusitano	Lusitanian
Portugal	Ponei da Terceira	Ponei da Terceira
Portugal	Sorraia	
Romania	Arabian	Arab
Romania	Banat	
Romania	Dobrogeana	
Romania	Furioso-North-Star	Furioso-Northstar
Romania	Gidran	Gidran
Romania	Hutsul	Hutsul
Romania	Ialomita	
Romania	Lipitsa	Lipitsa
Romania	Moldovenesca	
Romania	Nonius	Nonius
Romania	Romanian Draft	
Romania	Romanian Mountain	
Romania	Romanian Sport horse	
Romania	Romanian Trotter	
Romania	Shagya-Arabian	Shagya Arab
Romania	Transylvaneana	
Russian Federation	Akhaltekinskaya	
Russian Federation	Altaiskaya	Altai
Russian Federation	American Saddle Horse	American Saddle Horse
Russian Federation	Amurskaya	
Russian Federation	Anglo-Kabarda	Anglo-Kabarda
Russian Federation	Arabian pure bred	Arab
Russian Federation	Avarskaya	
Russian Federation	Balkar	
Russian Federation	Bashkirskaya	
Russian Federation	Bityug	
Russian Federation	Boudennovskaya	Budyonny
Russian Federation	Buryatskaya	
Russian Federation	Byryatskaya	
Russian Federation	Charysh	
Russian Federation	Chernomorskaya	
Russian Federation	Chilkovskaya	
Russian Federation	Chistokrovnaya Arabskaya	Arab
Russian Federation	Chumyshskaya Porodnaya Gruppa	
Russian Federation	Chuvashskaya	
Russian Federation	Cossack	
Russian Federation	Dagestanskii Poni	Dagestan Pony
Russian Federation	Donskaya	Don
Russian Federation	Estonskii Tyazhelovoz	Estonian Draft
Russian Federation	Hannover	Hanoverian
Russian Federation	Kabardinskaya	Kabarda
Russian Federation	Kalmutskaya	
Russian Federation	Karachaevskaya	Karachai
Russian Federation	Karel'skaya	
Russian Federation	Kumykskaya	
Russian Federation	Kushumskaya	
Russian Federation	Kuznetskaya Porodnaya Gruppa	
Russian Federation	Lezginskaya	
Russian Federation	Lovetskaya	
Russian Federation	Mezenskaya	
Russian Federation	Minusinsk	
Russian Federation	Narym	
Russian Federation	Novoaltaiskaya	
Russian Federation	Obva	
Russian Federation	Onega	
Russian Federation	Orlovskaya Courser	Orlov Trotter
Russian Federation	Orlovskaya verkhovaya	Orlov Saddle Horse
Russian Federation	Orlovskii Rysak	Orlov Trotter
Russian Federation	Pechorskaya	
Russian Federation	Priobskaya	
Russian Federation	Przewalski Horse	Przewalski Horse
Russian Federation	Rostopchin	
Russian Federation	Russian Courser	
Russian Federation	Russian Draft	
Russian Federation	Russkaya krovnaya verkhovaya	
Russian Federation	Russkii Rysak	Russian Trotter
Russian Federation	Russkii Tyazhelovoz	
Russian Federation	Sovetskii Tyazhelovoz	Soviet Heavy Draft
Russian Federation	Soviet Saddle	
Russian Federation	Srednekolymskaya	
Russian Federation	Tavdinskaya	
Russian Federation	Terskaya	Tersk
Russian Federation	Thoroughbred Saddle	Thoroughbred
Russian Federation	Tomskaya	
Russian Federation	Toriyskaya	
Russian Federation	Trakeninskaya	Trakehner
Russian Federation	Tuvinskaya	
Russian Federation	Tuvinskaya upryazhnaya	
Russian Federation	Verkhne-Eniseiskaya	
Russian Federation	Vladimirskaya	
Russian Federation	Vladimirskaya Tyazhelovoznaya	
Russian Federation	Voronezhskaya upryazhnaya	
Russian Federation	Vyatskaya	
Russian Federation	Yakutskaya	
Russian Federation	Zabaykalskaya	
Saint Kitts and Nevis	Horse	
Saudi Arabia	Keheilan	
Saudi Arabia	Maneghi	
Saudi Arabia	Saklawi	Arab
Senegal	Anglo-Arabe	Anglo-Arab
Senegal	Arab	Arab
Senegal	Barbe	Barb
Senegal	Fleuve	
Senegal	Fouta	
Senegal	Locale	
Senegal	M' Par	
Senegal	M'bayar	
Senegal	West African Barb	West African Barb
Serbia	Arab	Arab Horse
Serbia	Domestic-Mountain Pony	Bosnian Pony
Serbia	Haflinger	Haflinger
Serbia	Hanover	Hanoverian
Serbia	Holstein	
Serbia	KWPN	
Serbia	Lipizzaner	Lipitsa
Serbia	Nonius	Nonius
Serbia	Pinto	
Serbia	Quarter	Quarter Horse
Serbia	Styrian Horse	
Serbia	Thoroughbred	Thoroughbred
Serbia	Trakener	Trakehner
Serbia	Trotter	American Trotter
Slovakia	Anglický plnokrvník	Thoroughbred
Slovakia	Arabský kôň	Shagya Arab
Slovakia	Arabský plnokrvník	Arab
Slovakia	Furioso	Furioso-Northstar
Slovakia	Hafling	Haflinger
Slovakia	Hucul	Hutsul
Slovakia	Lipican	Lipitsa
Slovakia	Nonius	Nonius
Slovakia	Norik muránskeho typu	Noric
Slovakia	Slovenský teplokrvník	
Slovakia	Slovenský športový pony	
Slovenia	Ljutomerski kasac	
Slovenia	angleški polnokrvni konj	Thoroughbred
Slovenia	arabski konj	Arab
Slovenia	arabski polnokrvni konj	Arab
Slovenia	bosanski planinski konj	Bosnian Mountain Horse
Slovenia	haflinški konj	Haflinger
Slovenia	hannoverian	Hanoverian
Slovenia	islandski konj	Iceland Pony
Slovenia	kasaški konj	
Slovenia	lipicanski konj	Lipizzan horse
Slovenia	medzimurski konj	
Slovenia	noric	Noric
Slovenia	posavski konj	Posavina
Slovenia	slovenski hladnokrvni konj	*
Slovenia	slovenski toplokrvni konj	
Slovenia	thoroughbred	Thoroughbred
Somalia	Somali Pony	
South Africa	American Quarter Horse	Quarter Horse
South Africa	American Saddle Horse	American Saddle Horse
South Africa	Andalusian	Andalusian
South Africa	Appaloosa	Appaloosa
South Africa	Arab Horse	Arab
South Africa	Boer	Boer
South Africa	Calvinia	
South Africa	Cape Harness	
South Africa	Cape Horse	
South Africa	Clydesdale	Clydesdale
South Africa	Connemara Pony	Connemara Pony
South Africa	English Halbblut Horse	
South Africa	European Warmblood	
South Africa	Friesian Horse	Friesian
South Africa	Hackney	Hackney
South Africa	Hackney Pony	Hackney Pony
South Africa	Hafflinger	Haflinger
South Africa	Highland Pony	Highland Pony
South Africa	Highland sporting	Highland Pony
South Africa	Lippizzaner	Lipitsa
South Africa	Lusitano	Lusitanian
South Africa	Morgan	Morgan
South Africa	Namaqua Pony	
South Africa	Namib Horse	
South Africa	Nooitgedacht Pony	Nooitgedacht Pony
South Africa	Paint	American Paint
South Africa	Percheron	Percheron
South Africa	Rancher	
South Africa	SA Miniature Horse	
South Africa	SA Sporting horse	
South Africa	SA Warm Blood	
South Africa	Saddler	American Saddle Horse
South Africa	Shetland Pony	Shetland Pony
South Africa	Shire	Shire
South Africa	Thoroughbred	Thoroughbred
South Africa	Vlaamperd	Flamand
South Africa	Welsh Pony	Welsh Pony
Spain	Anglo-Árabe	
Spain	Asturcón	
Spain	Burguete	
Spain	Caballo de Deporte Español	
Spain	Caballo de Monte de País Vasco	
Spain	Caballo de las Retuertas	
Spain	Cabalo de Pura Raza Galega	
Spain	Cavall Mallorquí	
Spain	Cavall Menorquí	
Spain	Cavall Pirinenc Català	
Spain	Española	Andalusian
Spain	Hispano-Bretón	
Spain	Hispano-Árabe	Hispano-Arabe
Spain	Jaca Navarra	
Spain	Losina	
Spain	Marismeña	
Spain	Monchina	
Spain	Pottoka	Pottok
Spain	Pura Sangre Inglés	Thoroughbred
Spain	Trotador Español	
Spain	Árabe	Arab
Sri Lanka	Sri Lankan Pony	
Sudan	Dongola	Dongola
Sudan	Sudan Country-Bred	
Sudan	Tawleed	
Sudan	West African Dongola	West African Dongola
Sudan	Western Sudan Pony	
Suriname	Dutch warmblood	Dutch Warmblood
Suriname	Mangalarga	Mangalarga
Suriname	Pinto	American Paint
Suriname	Quarter	Quarter Horse
Suriname	Tennessee Walking Horse	Tennessee Walking Horse
Suriname	Thoroughbred	Thoroughbred
Sweden	Arab Thoroughbred	Anglo-Arab
Sweden	Arabhäst	Arab
Sweden	Connemaraponny	Connemara Pony
Sweden	Dartmoor ponny	Dartmoor Pony
Sweden	English Thoroughbred	Thoroughbred
Sweden	Exmoor ponny	Exmoor Pony
Sweden	Fjordhäst	Fjord
Sweden	Gotlandruss	Gotland Pony
Sweden	Haflingerhäst	Haflinger
Sweden	Islandshäst	Iceland Pony
Sweden	Kallblodstravare	
Sweden	Knabstrupperhäst	Knabstrupper
Sweden	Lipizzanerhäst	Lipitsa
Sweden	Morgan	Morgan
Sweden	Newforest	New Forest Pony
Sweden	Nordsvensk Brukshäst	
Sweden	Painthorse	American Paint
Sweden	Quarterhäst	Quarter Horse
Sweden	Shagya Arabian Horse	Shagya Arab
Sweden	Shetlandsponny	Shetland Pony
Sweden	Svensk ardennerhäst	
Sweden	Svensk ridponny	Swedish Riding Pony
Sweden	Svensk varmblodig travare	
Sweden	Svenskt fullblod	Thoroughbred
Sweden	Svenskt halvblod	Swedish Warmblood
Sweden	Welsh ponny	Welsh Pony
Switzerland	Burgdorfer	
Switzerland	CH-Warmblut	
Switzerland	Einsiedler	
Switzerland	Franches-Montagnes	Freiberger
Switzerland	Haflinger	Haflinger
Syrian Arab Republic	Arab	Arab
Syrian Arab Republic	Syrian	
Tajikistan	Karabairskaya	Karabair
Tajikistan	Lokaiskaya	
Tajikistan	Tadzhikskaya Verkhovaya	
Tanzania, United Republic of	Horse	
Thailand	Thai Pony	
Togo	Koto-Koli Pony	Koto-Koli Pony
Tonga	Local Horse	
Tunisia	Arabe	Arab
Tunisia	Arabe Barbe	West African Barb
Tunisia	Barbe	Barb
Tunisia	Hamdani	Arab
Tunisia	Le poney des Mogods	
Tunisia	Nefza Pony	
Tunisia	pur-sang anglais	Thoroughbred
Turkey	Anatolian	
Turkey	Arab	Arab
Turkey	Canik	
Turkey	English	Thoroughbred
Turkey	Gemlik	
Turkey	Haflinger	Haflinger
Turkey	Hinis	
Turkey	Karacabey Halfbred Arab	
Turkey	Karacabey-Nonius	
Turkey	Kurdi	Kurdi
Turkey	Malakan	
Turkey	Mytilene Pony	
Turkey	Rumelian Pony	
Turkey	Turkish Arab	
Turkey	Uzunyayla	
Turkey	Çukurova	
Turkmenistan	Adaevskaya	Adaev
Turkmenistan	Akhal-Tekinskaya	Akhal-Teke
Turkmenistan	yomood	
Uganda	Horse	
Ukraine	American Standardbred Trotter	American Trotter
Ukraine	Arabic	Arab
Ukraine	Budyonnivska	Budyonny
Ukraine	French Trotter	
Ukraine	German Bessarabian	
Ukraine	Gutsul	Hutsul
Ukraine	Hafflinger	Haflinger
Ukraine	Hanover	Hanoverian
Ukraine	Latvian Harness	
Ukraine	Newolexandrian heavy draft	
Ukraine	Nogai	
Ukraine	Orlov Trotter	Orlov Trotter
Ukraine	Russian Heavy Draft	
Ukraine	Russian Trotter	Russian Trotter
Ukraine	Shetland Pony	Shetland Pony
Ukraine	Streletska (shooter's)	
Ukraine	Tarpan	Tarpan
Ukraine	Thoroughbred	Thoroughbred
Ukraine	Torian	
Ukraine	Trakenian	Trakehner
Ukraine	Ukrainian Saddle	
Ukraine	Westphalian	Westphalian Warmblood
United Kingdom	Akhal Teke	Akhal-Teke
United Kingdom	Alpine	
United Kingdom	American Miniature Horse	
United Kingdom	American Quarter Horse	Quarter Horse
United Kingdom	American Saddle	American Saddle Horse
United Kingdom	Andalucian	Andalusian
United Kingdom	Anglo European	
United Kingdom	Anglo-Arab	
United Kingdom	Appaloosa	Appaloosa
United Kingdom	Arab	Arab
United Kingdom	Ardennes	Belgian Draft
United Kingdom	Barra Pony	
United Kingdom	Bavarian	Bavarian Warmblood
United Kingdom	Bavarian Warmblood	
United Kingdom	British Falabella	
United Kingdom	British Piebald	
United Kingdom	British Riding Pony	
United Kingdom	British Show Horse	
United Kingdom	British Skewbald	
United Kingdom	British Spotted Pony, Spotted Pony	
United Kingdom	Camargue	Camargue
United Kingdom	Caspian	Caspian
United Kingdom	Cleveland Bay	Cleveland Bay
United Kingdom	Clydesdale	Clydesdale
United Kingdom	Coloured Horse & Pony	
United Kingdom	Connemara	Connemara Pony
United Kingdom	Cushendale	
United Kingdom	Dales	Dales
United Kingdom	Dales Pony	
United Kingdom	Dartmoor Hill Pony	
United Kingdom	Dartmoor Pony	Dartmoor Pony
United Kingdom	Devon Pack Horse	
United Kingdom	Donkey	
United Kingdom	Eriskay	
United Kingdom	Exmoor Pony	Exmoor Pony
United Kingdom	Falabella	Falabella Pony
United Kingdom	Fell Pony	Fell Pony
United Kingdom	Fjord	Fjord
United Kingdom	Friesian	Friesian
United Kingdom	Galloway Pony	
United Kingdom	Gocan	
United Kingdom	Goonhilly	
United Kingdom	Great Horse	
United Kingdom	Hackney	Hackney
United Kingdom	Hackney Pony	
United Kingdom	Haflinger	Haflinger
United Kingdom	Hanoverian	Hanoverian
United Kingdom	Hebridean Pony	
United Kingdom	Highland Pony	Highland Pony
United Kingdom	Hispano-Arabe	
United Kingdom	Icelandic	Iceland Pony
United Kingdom	Irish Draught	Irish Draught
United Kingdom	Kerry Bog Pony	
United Kingdom	Knabstrupper Horse	
United Kingdom	Konik Pony	
United Kingdom	Lipizzaner	Lipitsa
United Kingdom	Long Mynd	
United Kingdom	Lundy	
United Kingdom	Lusitano	Lusitanian
United Kingdom	Manx	
United Kingdom	Miniature Horse	
United Kingdom	Miniature Mediterranean Donkey	
United Kingdom	Morgan	Morgan
United Kingdom	New Forest	New Forest Pony
United Kingdom	New Forest Pony	
United Kingdom	Palomino	Palomino
United Kingdom	Percheron	Percheron
United Kingdom	Poitou Donkey	
United Kingdom	Russian	
United Kingdom	Selle Francais Horse	
United Kingdom	Shetland	Shetland Pony
United Kingdom	Shire	Shire
United Kingdom	Skewbald/Piebald	
United Kingdom	Spanish Horse	
United Kingdom	Sport Horse	
United Kingdom	Sport Pony	
United Kingdom	Spotted	
United Kingdom	Standard Bred Trotting Horse	
United Kingdom	Suffolk	Suffolk
United Kingdom	Tennessee	Tennessee Walking Horse
United Kingdom	Tersk	Tersk
United Kingdom	Thoroughbred	
United Kingdom	Tiree	
United Kingdom	Traditional Gypsy Cob	
United Kingdom	Trakehner	Trakehner
United Kingdom	Vardy	
United Kingdom	Warmblood/British Warmblood	
United Kingdom	Wels	
United Kingdom	Welsh	
United Kingdom	Welsh (Feral Section)	Welsh Pony
United Kingdom	Welsh Cob	
United Kingdom	Welsh Mountain (Semi-Feral)	
United Kingdom	Welsh Mountain Pony	
United Kingdom	Welsh Pony	
United Kingdom	Welsh Pony of Cob Type	
United Kingdom	Yorkshire Coach Horse	
United States of America	Akhal-Teke	Akhal-Teke
United States of America	American Cream Draft	
United States of America	American Miniature	
United States of America	American Saddle Horse	American Saddle Horse
United States of America	American Shetland Pony	Shetland Pony
United States of America	American Trotter	American Trotter
United States of America	American Walking Pony	
United States of America	Appaloosa	Appaloosa
United States of America	Appaloosa Pony	
United States of America	Assateague Pony	
United States of America	Broomtail	
United States of America	Buckskin	
United States of America	Canadian	Canadian
United States of America	Caspian	Caspian
United States of America	Cayuse	
United States of America	Chickasaw	
United States of America	ChinCôteague Pony	
United States of America	Cleveland Bay	Cleveland Bay
United States of America	Clydesdale	Clydesdale
United States of America	Colorado Ranger	
United States of America	Conestoga	
United States of America	Cow Pony	
United States of America	Cracker	
United States of America	Exmoor	Exmoor Pony
United States of America	French Coach	
United States of America	German Coach	
United States of America	Indian	
United States of America	Kanata Pony	Kanata Pony
United States of America	Missouri Fox Trotting Horse	
United States of America	Morgan	Morgan
United States of America	Morocco Spotted	
United States of America	Narragansett Pacer	
United States of America	Palomino	Palomino
United States of America	Paso Fino	Paso Fino
United States of America	Quarter Horse	Quarter Horse
United States of America	Quarter Pony	
United States of America	Rocky Mountain	
United States of America	Sable Island Pony	Sable Island Pony
United States of America	Spanish Barb	
United States of America	Spanish Mustang	Mustang
United States of America	Suffolk	Suffolk
United States of America	Tennessee Walking Horse	Tennessee Walking Horse
United States of America	Welara Pony	
United States of America	Wild Mustang	Mustang
Uruguay	Akhal-Teke	Akhal-Teke
Uruguay	Anglo Arabe	Anglo-Arab
Uruguay	Anglo Normando	Anglo Normad
Uruguay	Appaloosa	Appaloosa
Uruguay	Belga	Belgian Warmblood
Uruguay	Breton	Breton
Uruguay	Caballo Deportivo Uruguayo	
Uruguay	Canelón (Desaparecido)	
Uruguay	Criollo Uruguayo	
Uruguay	Cuarto de Milla	Quarter Horse
Uruguay	Hackney	Hackney
Uruguay	Hannoveriano	Hanoverian
Uruguay	Holsteiner	
Uruguay	Iberoamericano	Iberoamericano
Uruguay	Lusitano	Lusitanian
Uruguay	Mangalarga Marchador	Mangalarga
Uruguay	Paint	American Paint
Uruguay	Percheron	Percheron
Uruguay	Peruano de Paso	Costeño
Uruguay	Polo Argentino	
Uruguay	Sangre Pura de Carrera	Thoroughbred
Uruguay	Shetland Pony	Shetland Pony
Uruguay	Silla Uruguayo	
Uruguay	Árabe	Arab
Uzbekistan	Adaevskaya	Adaev
Uzbekistan	Karabairskaya	Karabair
Venezuela	Appaloosa	Appaloosa
Venezuela	Arabe	Arab
Venezuela	Colombiano	
Venezuela	Cuarto de milla	Quarter Horse
Venezuela	Llanero	
Venezuela	Pura raza española	
Venezuela	Pura sangre de carrera	Thoroughbred
Venezuela	Shagya Arabe	Shagya Arab
Viet Nam	Cabadin	
Viet Nam	Ngua Noi	
Yemen	Abeia	
Yemen	Dahmaa	
Yemen	Giawf	
Yemen	Jofi	
Yemen	Omarqoub	
Yemen	Saqallwiya	
Yemen	Shweimaa	
Zambia	Belgian	Belgian Draft
Zambia	Percheron	Percheron
Zambia	Shire	Shire
Zambia	Suffolk	Suffolk
