= Age determination in Thoroughbred racing =

- Northern Hemisphere: January 1
- Southern Hemisphere: August 1
- Subject: Thoroughbred racing

Age determination in Thoroughbred racing is the system used to determine the official racing age of Thoroughbred horses. Under the system, horses are assigned a common date on which their racing age increases, rather than having their racing age determined individually from their actual dates of birth. In the Northern Hemisphere, this date is January 1, while in the Southern Hemisphere it is generally August 1.

The convention is sometimes informally described as a universal horse birthday or a horse's official birthday. The term refers to the standardized date used for racing-age purposes rather than the horse's actual date of birth.

== Convention ==
=== Northern Hemisphere ===
In the Northern Hemisphere, Thoroughbred racing organizations generally use January 1 as the date on which a horse's official racing age increases. The Jockey Club's rules state that, for the purpose of determining the age of a Thoroughbred, its date of birth is deemed to be January 1 of the year in which it was foaled.

The British Horseracing Authority similarly states that racehorses are considered to become a year older on January 1 each year.

Consequently, Thoroughbreds born at different points during the same foaling year are assigned the same official age for racing purposes when January 1 is reached.

=== Southern Hemisphere ===
In the Southern Hemisphere, the corresponding date is generally August 1. In Australia, for example, Thoroughbred horses officially increase in age on August 1 regardless of their actual date of birth.

The difference between January 1 and August 1 reflects the different racing and breeding calendars used in the two hemispheres.

== Purpose ==
The standardized system provides a consistent method for classifying Thoroughbreds by age. This is important because many races are restricted to horses within specified age groups.

Without a common age-change date, horses born only a few months apart could fall into different official age classifications depending on their individual birth dates. A standardized date allows race conditions to apply the same age classifications to horses within a racing jurisdiction.

Academic research on Thoroughbred racing performance also uses these standardized age classifications when studying performance across different age cohorts.

=== Age-restricted races ===
Thoroughbred racing includes races restricted to particular age groups. Examples include races for two-year-olds and three-year-olds. The standardized age system is therefore used when determining whether a horse is eligible for races whose conditions specify an age range.

The system is also relevant to racing records and the administration of Thoroughbred pedigrees.

=== Weight-for-age ===
Age determination is also relevant to weight-for-age conditions in horse racing. Weight-for-age scales provide different weight allowances according to the age of competing horses and the time of year.

== History ==
=== Britain ===
The convention developed in British Thoroughbred racing during the 19th century. Before the adoption of January 1, May 1 was used as the common date for determining the age of racehorses.

On April 25, 1833, members of the Jockey Club agreed at Newmarket that horses there would use January 1 rather than May 1 as their common birth date for racing purposes. The change was subsequently extended throughout Britain, with January 1 becoming the nationwide convention in 1858.

=== United States ===
The January 1 convention was also adopted in the United States. Racing practices differed between northern and southern parts of the country during the 19th century. Following the American Civil War, racing in the United States became increasingly centered on northern racing jurisdictions, contributing to the standardization of the January 1 system.

The Jockey Club's registry rules subsequently defined a Thoroughbred's date of birth as January 1 of the year in which it was foaled for the purpose of determining its age.

== Terminology ==
The phrase universal horse birthday is an informal description of the standardized racing-age convention. The phrase has appeared in sports journalism, including a 1961 article in The New York Times discussing the difference between the January 1 and August 1 conventions.

Official racing organizations generally describe the system in terms of age determination, official birth dates, or the date on which a horse's racing age increases rather than using "universal horse birthday" as a formal regulatory term.

== See also ==
- Thoroughbred
- Horse racing
- Horse breeding
- Weight for Age
