= Canadian Warmblood =

Canadian breed of warmblood sport horse

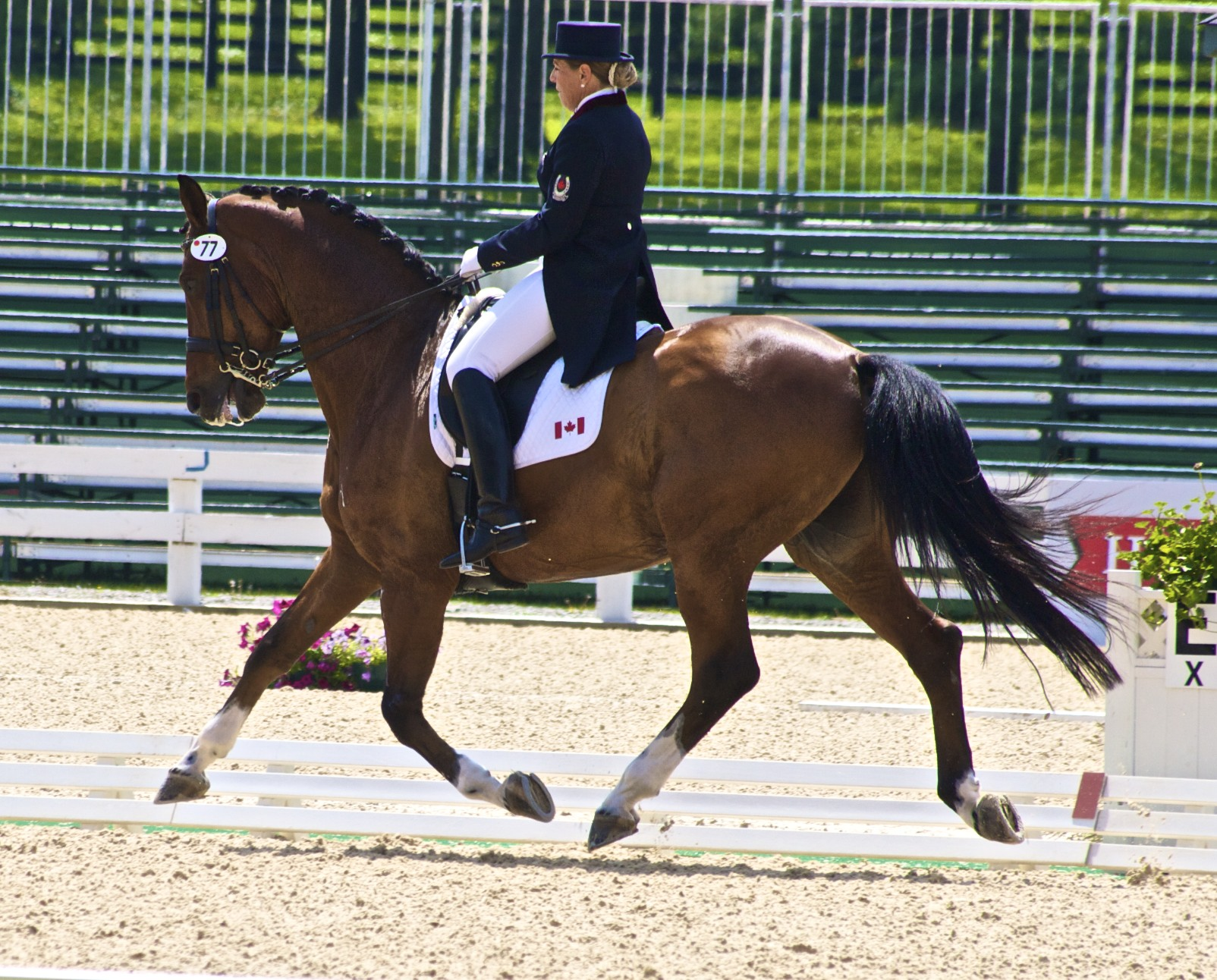
- Pikardi and Bonny Bonnello at the Kentucky Cup in 2010
- Conservation status: FAO (2007): not listed; DAD-IS (2023): at risk/critical
- Country of origin: Canada

Traits
- Weight: average: 600 kg
- Height: range 152–173 cm; average: 165 cm
- Colour: any but leopard-spotted

The Canadian Warmblood is a Canadian breed or registry of warmblood sport horses with European warmblood ancestry. Admission to the stud-book is based on both performance and parentage: a horse must have in its pedigree at least one from a list of twenty-five influential European warmblood stallions foaled between 1840 and 1926, and must also pass a Keuring or performance inspection.

A breed association, the Canadian Warmblood Horse Breeders Association, was established in 1991; it is a member of the World Breeding Federation for Sport Horses.

It is a distinct and separate breed from the Canadian Sport Horse.
