= Canadian Sport Horse =

Canadian breed of warmblood horse

- Country of origin: Canada
- Use: Sport horse

Traits
- Weight: Around 600 kg
- Height: From 1.62 m to 1.65 m

The Canadian Sport Horse is a studbook of sport horses managed in Canada. These horses are crossbred between Thoroughbred stallions and local, Canadian-bred mares. It was formerly known as the Canadian Hunter; a breed society was formed in 1926. The breed name was changed in 1984.

The Canadian Sport Horse is intended for equestrian sport competitions, especially show jumping and dressage. It is a distinct and separate breed from both the Canadian and the Canadian Warmblood.

== History ==
The English lieutenant Dan Lysons mentioning the jumping ability of Canadian horses in 1893.

The Canadian Hunter was the result of half-blood crosses between local Canadian mares and Thoroughbred stallions, including 16 imported from England to Ontario by the Canadian Racing Association. In 1926, the Canadian Hunter, Saddle and Light Horse Improvement Society was founded. A studbook was opened in 1928 to register the founding mares. In 1933, the Canadian Hunter Society was amalgamated, and the Canadian Hunter studbook was maintained.

At the beginning of the twentieth century many of these horses were sold to the United States, where they were used for show jumping and hunter seat. Others were sent to Europe as part of the World War II. In 1920, the Canadian federal government became involved in horse breeding, with the aim of obtaining a uniform type of horse weighing around 550 kg.

The studbook was renamed in 1984 to include the designation 'Sport Horse'. The name change was registered the following year in the Official Trademark Journal. The breed was renamed Canadian Sport Horse in 1987.

Many of the horses are in Ontario. Numbers were growing in 2014.

== Characteristics ==
Height at the withers must be no less than 1.62 m for registered in the studbook.

This horse is close to English and Irish Hunters, showing a clear Thoroughbred influence, with a solid build and fluid movements. The eyes are large, the neck length proportional to the body. The chest is broad and the shoulder sloping.

Its nutritional requirements are greater than those of the Canadian horse.

The coat is plain, generally bay (including bay-brown), chestnut, black or gray. pinto and cream are possible, as are palomino and cremello.

=== Selection ===
Selection is managed by the Canadian Sport Horse Association, which describes the Canadian Sport Horse as an "evolving" breed, whose existence is closely linked to selection objectives. Horses are registered by inspection. Young horses are shown at model and gait competitions, including the prestigious Royal Horse Show, where an expert (e.g., a veterinarian) is appointed to evaluate them. The association looks for powerful horses with good jumping ability, suitable for all three Olympic equestrian sports. Particular attention is paid to gaits, which must show balance and drive. Stallion selection is particularly rigorous.

The studbook association, Canadian National Live Stock Records, is based in Ottawa, Ontario. Mares that do not belong to the Canadian Sport Horse registry can be registered on an appendix list.

== Use ==
This is a sport horse, used under saddle and in equestrian sports. It is ridden in show jumping, dressage, eventing and hunter competitions; it is also used for foxhunting and carriage driving.

== Bibliography ==
- Bennett, K.; Davidson, John (2015). Canadian "The Little Iron Horse" For Kids. Mendon Cottage Books. ISBN 9781311563675.
- Cabrera, Ángel (2004). Chevaux d'Amérique (in French). Translated by Bellec, Christine. Éditions du Rocher. ISBN 2-268-05129-3.
- Dutson, Judith (2005). "Canadian Sport Horse". Storey's Illustrated Guide to 96 Horse Breeds of North America. Storey publishing. ISBN 1-58017-613-5.
- Dutson, Judith (2012). Storey's Illustrated Guide to 96 Horse Breeds of North America (2nd ed.). Storey Publishing. ISBN 978-1-60342-918-4.
- Dutson, Judith (2012b). Horse Breeds of North America The Pocket Guide to 96 Essential Breeds. Storey Publishing. ISBN 978-1-61212-210-6. OCLC 820723081.
- Hendricks, Bonnie (2007). "Canadian Sport Horse". International Encyclopedia of Horse Breeds (2nd ed.). University of Oklahoma Press. ISBN 978-0-8061-3884-8.
- O'Dea, Joseph (1996). Olympic Vet: A Didactic Memoir. Castlerea Press.
- Porter, Valerie; Alderson, Lawrence; Hall, Stephen; Sponenberg, Dan (2016). "Canadian Sport Horse". Mason's World Encyclopedia of Livestock Breeds and Breeding (6th ed.). CAB International. ISBN 978-1-84593-466-8.
- Porter, Valerie (2002). Mason's World Dictionary of Livestock Breeds, Types and Varieties. CABI. ISBN 978-0-85199-430-7.
- Porter, Valerie (2020). Mason's World Dictionary of Livestock Breeds, Types and Varieties (6th ed.). CAB International. ISBN 978-1-78924-153-2.
- Rousseau, Élise Rousseau (2014). "Cheval de sport canadien". Tous les chevaux du monde. Delachaux et Niestlé. ISBN 978-2-603-01865-1.
