= Pedigree =

== Breeding ==
- Pedigree chart, a document to record ancestry, used by genealogists in study of human family lines, and in selective breeding of other animals
  - Pedigree, a human genealogy (ancestry chart)
  - Pedigree (animal), a breed registry
    - Purebred, or "pedigreed" animal with a recorded lineage

== Brands and companies ==
- Pedigree Dolls & Toys, British toy company that produced Sindy dolls
- Pedigree Petfoods, a company that manufactures pet food
- Marston's Pedigree, an English ale

== Other uses ==
- Pedigree (novel), an autobiographical novel by Georges Simenon
- The Pedigree (professional wrestling), a finishing maneuver in professional wrestling made famous by Triple H
- Pedigree, a memoir by Patrick Modiano
- Provenance of (for example) an idea
