= List of Russian horse breeds =

This is a list of the horse breeds considered in Russia to be wholly or partly of Russian origin, including breeds from the Russian Federation and from the former Soviet Union. Some may have complex or obscure histories, so inclusion here does not necessarily imply that a breed is predominantly or exclusively Russian.

English name	Other names	Notes	Image
Akhal-Teke	Ахалтекинская; Akhaltekinskaya^{[1]}		
Altai	Altaiskaya^{[1]}^{[2]}		
Amur	Amurskaya^{[1]}	extinct	
Anglo-Kabarda^{[1]}			
Avar	Avarskaya^{[1]}	variant of Dagestani^{[3]}	
Balkar^{[1]}		mountain variant of Kabardin^{[3]}	
Bashkir	Башкирская; Bashkirskaya^{[1]}^{[2]}		
Bityug^{[1]}		extinct	
Budyonny	Будённовская; Boudennovskaya^{[1]}; Budennovskaya^{[2]}		
Buryat	Buryatskaya^{[1]}; Baikal^{[3]}; Zabaikal; Zabaykalskaya^{[1]}		
Byelorussian Harness Horse	Belorusskaya Uprazhnaya^{[2]}		
	Byryatskaya^{[1]}		
Chara^{[3]}		draught derivative of Altai^{[3]}	
Charysh^{[1]}		derived from Altai^{[3]}	
Chernomor	Chernomorskaya^{[1]}	extinct	
Chilkov	Chilkovskaya^{[1]}	extinct	
Chumysh	Chumyshskaya^{[1]}	derived from Altai^{[3]}	
Chuvash	Chuvashskaya^{[1]}	extinct	
Cossack^{[1]}		extinct	
Dagestani	Dagestanskii Poni^{[1]}		
Deliboz	Delibozskaya^{[1]}		
Don	Donskaya^{[1]}^{[2]}		
Estonian Heavy Draught	Estonskii Tyazhelovoz^{[1]}		
Estonian Native	Mestnaya Estonskaya^{[2]}		
Hutsul^{[2]}			
Iomud	Iomudskaya^{[2]}		
Kabarda	Kabardinskaya^{[1]}^{[2]}		
Kalmyk	Kalmutskaya^{[1]}		
Karabair	Karabairskaya^{[2]}		
Karabakh	Karabakhskaya^{[2]}		
Karachay	Karachaevskaya^{[1]}		
Karelian	Karel'skaya^{[1]}	North Russian group, extinct^{[3]}	
Kazakh	Kazakhskaya^{[2]}		
Kumyk	Kumykskaya^{[1]}	variant of Dagestani^{[3]}	
Kushum	Kushumskaya^{[1]}^{[2]}		
Kustanai	Kustanaiskaya^{[2]}		
Kuznetsk^{[2]}	Кузнецкая; Kuznetskaya^{[1]}		
Latvian horse	Latviiskaya^{[2]}		
Lezgian	Lezginskaya^{[1]}	variant of Dagestani^{[3]}	
Lithuanian Heavy Draught	Litovskaya Tyazhelovoznaya^{[2]}		
Lokai	Lokaiskaya^{[2]}		
Lovets	Lovetskaya^{[1]}	extinct	
Mezen	Mezenskaya^{[1]}	North Russian group^{[3]}	
	Minusinsk^{[1]}	extinct	
Narym^{[1]}	Нарымская; Narymskaya		
	Novoaltaiskaya^{[1]}		
Novokirghiz	Novokirgizskaya^{[2]}		
Obva^{[1]}		extinct	
Onega^{[1]}		North Russian group, extinct^{[3]}	
Orlov Trotter	Russian: Орловский Рысак; Orlovskii Rysak^{[1]}; Russian: Орловская Рысистая; Orlovskaya Rysistaya^{[2]}; Orlovskaya Courser^{[1]}		
	Orlovskaya Verkhovaya^{[1]}	extinct	
Pechora	Pechorskaya^{[1]}	North Russian group^{[3]}	
Priob	Priobskaya^{[1]}		
Rostopchin^{[1]}		extinct	
Russian Draught^{[1]}			
Russian Heavy Draught	Russkii Tyazhelovoz^{[1]}		
	Russkaya Krovnaya Verkhovaya^{[1]}	extinct	
Russian Trotter^{[1]}	Russian: Русский Рысак; Russkii Rysak^{[1]}; Russian: Ру́сская Рыси́стая; Russkaya Rysistaya^{[2]}; Orlov-American Trotter		
Soviet Heavy Draught	Sovetskii Tyazhelovoz^{[1]}		
Soviet Saddle Horse^{[1]}			
Srednekolymsk	Srednekolymskaya^{[1]}		
Tavda	Tavdinskaya^{[1]}	North Russian group^{[3]}	
Tersk	Terskaya^{[1]}^{[2]}		
Tomsk	Tomskaya^{[1]}	extinct	
Tori	Toriyskaya^{[1]}; Toriiskaya^{[2]}		
Tuva	Tuvinskaya^{[1]}		
	Tuvinskaya Upryazhnaya^{[1]}	extinct	
Ukrainian Saddle Horse	Ukrainskaya Verkhovaya Porodnaya^{[1]}		
Upper Yenisei Horse^{[3]}	Verkhne-Eniseiskaya^{[1]}		
Vladimir	Vladimirskaya^{[1]}		
Vladimir Heavy Draught	Vladimirskaya Tyazhelovoznaya^{[1]}		
Voronezh Coach Horse^{[3]}	Voronezhskaya Upryazhnaya^{[1]}	extinct	
Vyatka	Vyatskaya^{[1]}^{[2]}		
Yakut	Yakutskaya^{[1]}^{[2]}		
Žemaitukas	Жемайтская; Zhemaichu; Zhmudskaya^{[2]}		
