= List of Central Asian horse breeds =

This is a list of the horse breeds considered to originate wholly or partly in six Central Asian countries: Afghanistan, Kazakhstan, Kyrgyzstan, Tajikistan, Turkmenistan and Uzbekistan. Some may have complex or obscure histories, so inclusion here does not necessarily imply that a breed is predominantly or exclusively from those countries.

English name	Other names	Notes	Image
Akhal-Teke	Ахалтекинская; Akhaltekinskaya	Kazakhstan; Turkmenistan	
Adaev	Adaevskaya	Kazakhstan; Turkmenistan; Uzbekistan	
Betpakdalin		Zhezkazgan, Kazakhstan; variant of Jabe	
Borta		Afghanistan	
Buzkashi		Afghanistan	
Dawand		Afghanistan	
Don	Donskaya^{[1]}^{[2]}	Kyrgyzstan	
Habash		Afghanistan	
Herati		Afghanistan	
Iomud	Yomood, Iomudskaya	Turkmenistan	
Jabe		Kazakhstan	
Karabair	Karabairskaya	Kazakhstan; Tajikistan; Uzbekistan	
Kazakh	Kazakhskaya	Kazakhstan	
Kohband		Afghanistan	
Kushum	Kushumskaya	Kazakhstan	
Kustanai	Kustanaiskaya^{[2]}	Kazakhstan	
Kyrgyz	Kirgiz	Kyrgyzstan	
Lokai	Lokaiskaya	Tajikistan	
Mazari		Afghanistan	
Mugalzhar		Kazakhstan	
Novokirghiz	Novokirgizskaya	Kyrgyzstan	
Oryol	Orlov Saddle Horse; Orlovskaya	Kyrgyzstan	
Qatgani	Qataghani	Afghanistan	
Qazal		Afghanistan	
Russian Trotter		Kyrgyzstan	
Samand		Afghanistan	
Tadzhikskaya Verkhovaya		Tajikistan	
Tatar		Afghanistan	
Tooraq		Afghanistan	
Waziri		Afghanistan	
Yabu		Afghanistan	
Yargha		Afghanistan	
