= Adaev (horse) =

Horse native to south-west of Kazakhstan

Adai
- Country of origin: Kazakhstan
- Use: Riding, draft, meat, milk

Traits
- Weight: from 360 kg to 370 kg
- Height: From 1.32m to 1.44m
- Color: Bay, black, chestnut, gray, roan and cream gene

The Adai (Kazakh: "Адай жылқысы", Russian: Адаевская лошадь) is a horse breed utilized for riding and light draft work. It is indigenous to the desert regions of south-western Kazakhstan and constitutes one of the two principal types of the Kazakh breed, along with the Jabe. The Adai is generally finer in build and less hardy than the Jabe and is classified within the “Oriental Turk” type. The breed is mainly employed in traditional herding practices and local equestrian sports. Mares are also used for milk production, which remains an important aspect of its utilitarian role. Although Adai horses may be slaughtered for meat, this use is secondary. The breed is little known outside its native range but has spread to neighboring Turkmenistan and Uzbekistan. A population of approximately 29,000 Adai horses was reported in 1990.

== Name ==
The Adai, also known as Adaev and in Russian as Adaevskaya lochad, derives its name from the Adaï (Адай) military tribe, which has significance in Central Asian history.

== History ==
The Adai may have been influenced by the Turkoman horse and has more recently experienced the influence of the Don horse, the Thoroughbred, and the Orlov trotter. Uncontrolled crossbreeding led to a decline in breed uniformity and population size. In response, a selective breeding program was initiated in the late 20th century with the aim of improving overall quality, particularly by increasing body size and fertility. This program included improved feeding practices and the establishment of pedigree records. The use of so-called “improver” breeding methods became established in the Guryev region.

In 2011, state performance tests of Adai horses were conducted at the Akbastau border in the Mañğıstaw Region. From several thousand horses, thirty-six individuals considered representative of the breed were selected to participate. The trial required the horses to cover a distance of 90 km in a single day. Veterinary and jury teams monitored the animals’ condition throughout the test, recording indicators such as heart rate, blood pressure, and perspiration at 15 km intervals.

== Description ==
The Adai is classified as a steppe horse and is locally regarded as a type of the Kazakh horse rather than as a distinct breed. It is primarily adapted for riding. Compared with the Jabe, the Adai is more distantly related to the original Kazakh horse and is zootechnically classified within the Turkoman horse group. It is described as an “Eastern Turk” type, reflecting historical crossbreeding with Turkoman horses.

There are three types of Adai: massive, medium, and light. Overall, the model is rather light, with a dry constitution. Height ranges from 1.32 m to 1.44 m. Average weight is 360 kg for females and 370 kg for males, according to the DAD-IS database. Foals weigh between 39 and 50 kg at birth. Growth typically continues for about five years, with the most rapid development occurring during the first six months of life.

The head is often Roman-nosed, slender and light, with bright, wide-set eyes. Ears are straight and agile. The neck is long and fine, straight and set fairly high. The withers are well defined and prominent, the back generally straight. The topline is of good quality, the body deep and the ribs rounded. The croup is often swollen, but well muscled. The hindquarters are of good quality, with well-developed joints and clearly defined tendons. The skin is dense, and the coat grows thickly in winter. Some poorly bred or deficient horses have narrow chests and few bones.

Coat colors are highly variable and include bay, chestnut, black, gray, roan, and palomino.

Adai horses are traditionally raised in large free-ranging herds, known as taboons, and are well adapted to the arid and desert environments of southern Kazakhstan. They are noted for their endurance and ability to tolerate harsh breeding conditions, although they are considered less resilient than the Kazakh and Jabe horses. Seasonal fattening capacity has been documented: average daily weight gain in one-year-old foals ranges from 916 g in May–June to 667 g in October–November; in two-year-old horses, from 870 to 711 g; and in adult mares, from 750 to 600 g.

The Adai is characterized by high fertility rates, exceeding 90%. Mares start breeding at the age of two, and foals are usually born in April and May.

Some Adais have additional gaits. The best Adais are agile and have light gaits. The stride is rather short, with some elevation of the forelegs. Additionally, Adai horses are known for their gentle temperament and quick attachment to their riders.

== Uses ==
The Adai is primarily used in local equestrian sports and is considered better suited to riding than the Jabe, although it may also be harnessed for light draft work. Its pulling capacity is limited but remains notable relative to its size and body weight.

These horses are also used to work cattle and guard sheep herds.

They are also slaughtered for their meat, a purpose that mainly concerns the massive type of the breed, as the meat yield of Adais is generally low.

Mares, on the other hand, are recognized for their milk production, which is processed into kumis, with an estimated yield of 11 to 14 liters of milk per day. The Adai has been used in crossbreeding with the neighboring Jabe breed.

== Distribution ==
The Adai is classified as a regional Asian breed, with its habitat situated between the Caspian Sea and the Aral Sea, historically corresponding to desert plains within the Mañğıstaw oblys administrative region. In 1985, the population was estimated at 27,000 horses. A comprehensive population census conducted in 1990 recorded 28,949 Adai horses in Kazakhstan, indicating a stable demographic trend. In the same year, 772 Adai stallions were in use for breeding, alongside 12,772 broodmares, of which 44 were recorded as purebred. By 2006, the Adai was considered one of the two most widely distributed horse types in Kazakhstan, together with the Jabe.

It is little known outside its native area.

== See also ==
- List of Central Asian horse breeds

== Bibliography ==
- Hendricks, Bonnie Lou (2007). International Encyclopedia of Horse Breeds: Adai. Norman: University of Oklahoma Press. pp. 3–4. ISBN 978-0806138848. OCLC 154690199.
- Kosharov, A. N.; Pern, E. M.; Rozhdestvenskaya, G. A. (1989). Animal Genetic Resources of the USSR. Animal Production and Health Paper Publ: Horses. Rome: FAO.
- Pickeral, Tamsin (2003). Encyclopedia of horses and ponies. Barnes & Noble Books. p. 220. ISBN 0760734577..
- Porter, Valerie; Alderson, Lawrence; Hall, Stephen J. G.; Sponenberg, D. Phillip (9 March 2016). Mason's World Encyclopedia of Livestock Breeds and Breeding (6th ed.). CAB International. ISBN 978-1-84593-466-8. OCLC 948839453. OL 29071452M.
- Rousseau, Elise (September 2014). Tous les chevaux du monde (in French). Illustrator: Yann Le Bris. Delachaux et Niestlé. ISBN 978-2-603-01865-1. OL 26720039M.
- "Адаевская лошадь" (in Russian). Great Soviet Encyclopedia.
