= Amourski =

Breed of horses from Russia and China

Amourski or Manchurian pony
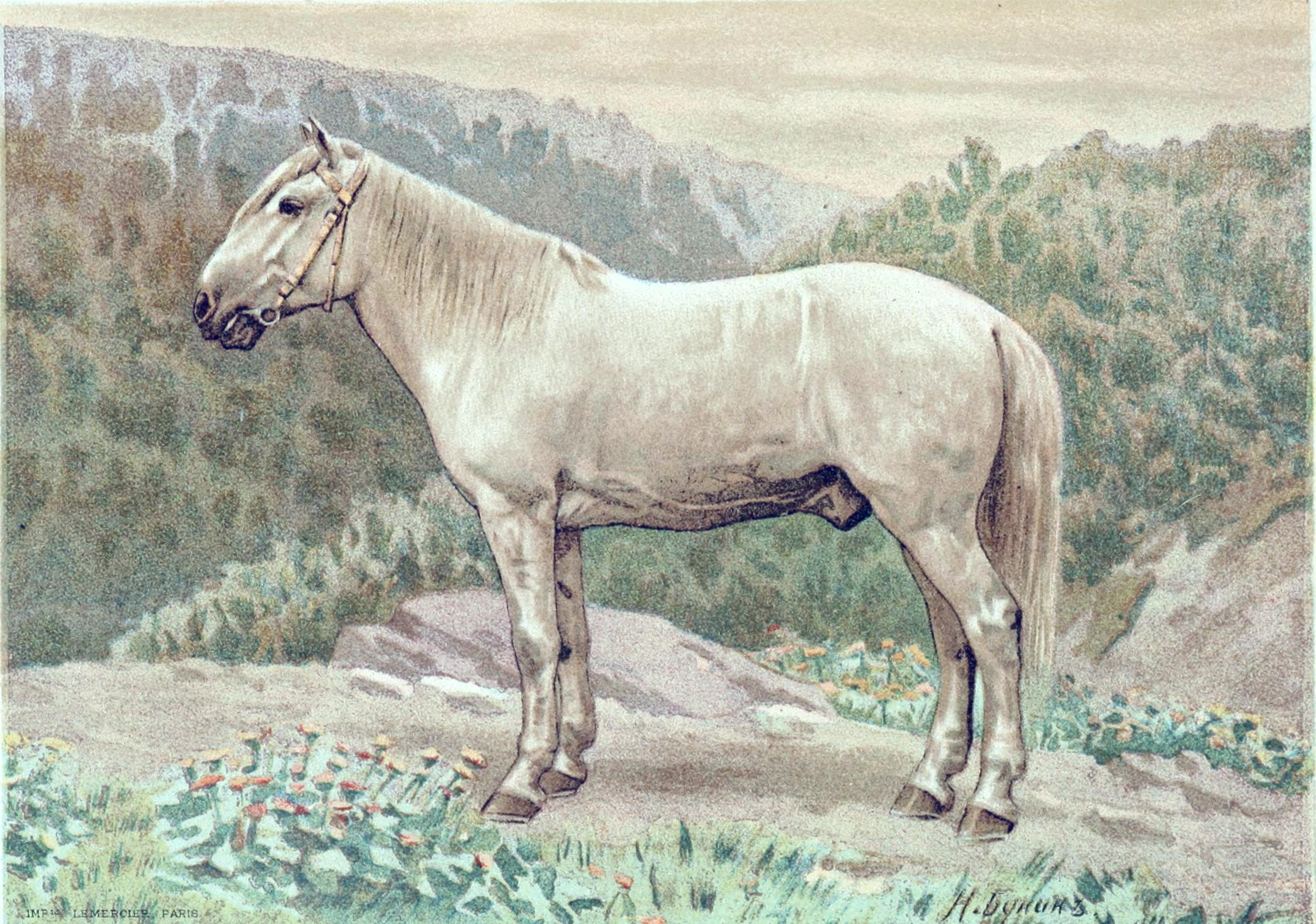
- Serko, a 1.37 m gray gelding, at the age of 14.
- Country of origin: Russia and China
- Use: Selle français and horse-drawn vehicle

Traits
- Height: From 1.30 m to 1.40 m
- Color: Bay and chestnut

The Amourski (Russian: Амурская лошадь, Amourskaïa lochad), also known as Amur horse or Manchurian pony, is an extinct breed of small Siberian and Manchurian horses. Formed in the early 19th century, it originated from the area around the Amur River in northeast Asia, in Russia and China. These small horses, more refined than other Siberian breeds, were usually ridden or driven, and were known for their hardiness.

The Amourski is best known for their endurance and cold hardiness. A horse named Serko successfully crossed Russia from east to west in 1889 with his rider Dimitri Pechkov. This breed was chosen for Ernest Shackleton's Nimrod expedition. Such events have inspired a number of romanticized accounts.

== Naming and sources ==
In Russian, the name attributed to these horses is Amourskaïa lochad (Амурская лошадь); they are also named, more simply, Amourskaïa or Amour. In China, the "Manchurian pony" seems very close: Jean-Louis Gouraud points out that this kinship between Manchurian and Amur ponies is mentioned in works from the late 19th century and by other authors. He also asserted that the horses of these regions "have no well-established breed", and are described as being "of Manchurian origin".

According to Jean-Louis Gouraud, who has researched the breed, documentation is "practically non-existent".

== History ==
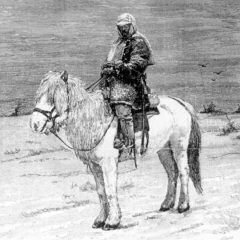
Serko and Dimitri Pechkov after the Journal des voyages, 1890.

According to the FAO and CAB International, which classify it as a pony, in Siberia, it is the result of a mix between Transbaikal and Tomsk horses, a specific breed formed in the early 19th century. These horses were the traditional mounts of the local Russian Cossacks: Leonid de Simonoff and Jean de Moerder (1894) referred to them as "a breed of horse bred by the Cossacks of the Amur".

In 1889, Cossack Dimitri Pechkov achieved what is considered the greatest equestrian feat of all time on an Amourski horse named Serko. He covered over 9,000 kilometers from Blagovechtchensk to the Tsar's court in St. Petersburg in less than 200 days on the same horse.

At the beginning of the 20th century, ten Manchurian ponies were chosen for Ernest Shackleton's Nimrod Expedition to the South Pole, because of their reputed resistance to the cold.

My knowledge of this glacier suggested that I should use Siberian or Manchurian ponies as draught animals. In these Asian countries, I had been told, there is a breed of small, very vigorous and hardy horses, which the natives harness to sledges and make work in very low temperatures. – Ernest Shackleton, Carnets de voyage.

The breed disappeared during the 20th century, probably through cross-breeding. On the Russian side, it was absorbed by the Orlov Trotter, the Russian Trotter, the Russian Don and the Budyonny. On the Chinese side, in 1986, the Heilongjiang stud farms only housed medium-heavy horses, as local zootechnicians intervened to increase the size and weight of the animals.

== Description ==
The morphology was light with a saddle pony type, being stocky and hardy. Externally, they were similar to Bashkir horses.

On the Russian side, this horse had been selected to produce a more refined saddle animal than other Siberian horses. Height at the withers ranges from 1.30 m to 1.40 m, according to Gouraud.

According to Jean-Louis Gouraud's description, the horses had a slightly arched muzzle, a short, thick neck and heavy gaskets. The back was long and straight, the loins powerful, and the rump massive, with a high set tail. The legs were well built. Abundant mane.

The coat was generally bay, gray or chestnut.

According to Shackleton's description of ponies, they were "accustomed to endure the greatest cold and to walk on ice as well as snow, these ponies [being] perhaps the hardiest animals in creation". Moreover, the Manchurian pony has been described in period documents as omnivorous.

Amourski, on the Russian side, were bred in herds of 10 to 20 head. In general, the horses did not bear any particular name, but were referred to solely by their physical characteristics.

== Usage ==
Video of the start of the Nimrod expedition: the "Manchurian ponies" are visible from 1 min 46.

According to CAB International, the Amourski is specifically bred to be ridden, Gouraud adding that it was probably a draft horse. Shackleton writes in his notebooks that these ponies were harnessed to sledges, and capable of pulling a 550 kg load 35 to 45 km a day. Moreover, a 1932 report by the South Manchurian Railway Company asserts that "overland traffic was mainly carried out by the vigorous Manchurian pony or by carriage, as in the past".

== Range ==
Amourski / Manchurian ponies originated along the Amur River, which separates China from Russia, on both sides of the river. They therefore originate from a vast cross-border territory in northeast Asia.

The Amourski is listed as a local breed specific to Siberia and now extinct, in the FAO's DAD-IS database.

== See also ==
- Horses in Russia

== Bibliography ==
- Gouraud, Jean-Louis (1996). Serko. Caracole (in French). Paris: Favre. ISBN 2-7441-0950-9.
- de Simonoff, Leonid; de Moerder, Jean (1894). Les races chevalines : Avec une étude spéciale sur les chevaux russes (in French). Paris: Librairie agricole de la maison rustique.
- Porter, Valerie; Alderson, Lawrence; Hall, Stephen; Sponenberg, Dan Phillip (2016). Mason's World Encyclopedia of Livestock Breeds and Breeding (6th ed.). CAB International.
