= Kalmyk horse =

Breed of horse

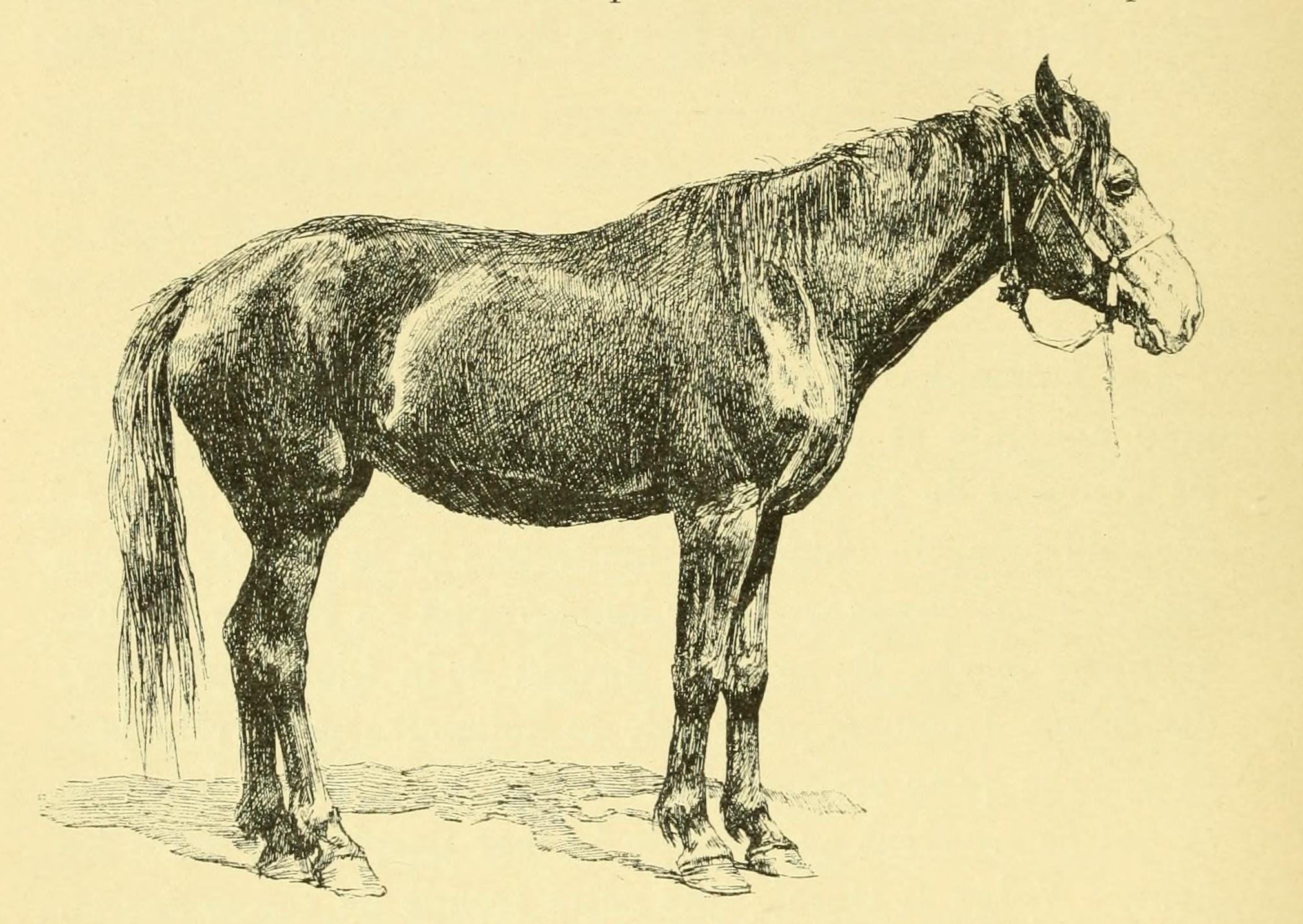
- Other names: Kalmykia horse
- Country of origin: Russia

The Kalmyk horse, also called the Kalmykia horse, is a rare horse breed descended from horses first brought to Russia by the Kalmyk people from Dzungaria during the 17th century.

== Characteristics ==
The Kalmyk is said to resemble the Kirgiz horse, though taller, with a longer neck, steeper shoulder, and a less steep croup. Their height averages 14.2 to 15 hands (58 to 60 inches, 147 to 152 cm), and some individuals may pace. They are sturdy with good endurance and able to withstand extremes of temperature.

== Breed history ==
The Kalmyk is considered part of the group of breeds that includes the Mongolian horse. The original foundation bloodstock brought to Russia by the Kalmyks was crossed with other breeds of saddle horse, including the Bashkort, Kazakh horse, Kabardin, Don horse, Anglo-Arab, and Orel horse. The Kalmyk people became the major supplier of horses to the Russian cavalry from about the mid-1600s until about 1740. In 1688, the Kalmyks drove 6,400 horses to Moscow for sale, and thereafter, Russian officers traveled to the Volga region to purchase Kalmyk horses. Records from the 1730s indicate that Russian merchants spent over 7000 rubles a year on Kalmyk horses for Russian dragoon regiments.

At its peak, the breed may have reached one million horses, but today is nearly extinct. A census in 1803 found over 238,000. However, no known selective breeding had been done since at least 1943, and by 1986, the breed was considered extinct other than through crossbreds. To resurrect the breed, 522 horses were located that still had characteristics of the original breed, mostly in isolated regions, and four breeding farms were set up in Russia to resurrect and preserve the breed.

== Uses ==
The Kalmyk today is used for both riding and driving. It was crossbred with the Kirgiz horse to create the foundation bloodstock for the Siberian horse.

== See also ==
- Horses in East Asian warfare
