= Tuva horse =

Russian horse breed

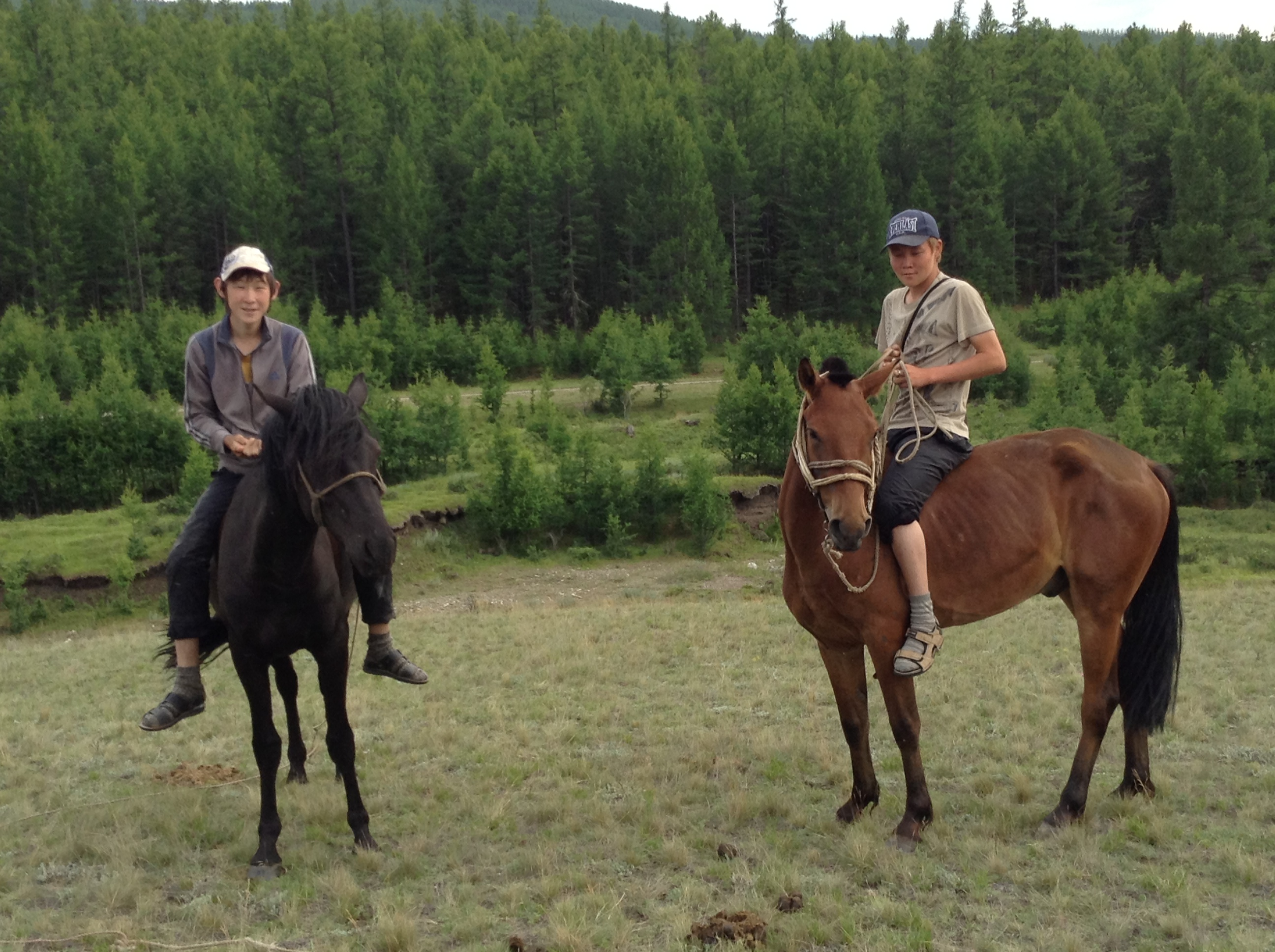
- Horse riders in Dzun-Khemchiksky District banner
- Country of origin: Tuva
- Use: Saddle horse

Traits
- Height: 1.27–1.37 m.
- Color: Bay, black, chestnut, and gray

The Tuva (Russian: Тувинская, Touvinskaïa) is a breed of small saddle horses native to the Tuva region of Russia. Classified among the "Siberian pony" family, it proves to be much closer to the Mongolian horse, having lived relatively isolated from other Asian and Eastern European horses. It has long been ridden by the nomadic horse riders of its region, for breeding and hunting. At the end of the 19th century, mineral extraction led to the import of draft horses and saddles, giving rise through crossbreeding to the Upper Yenisei horse (Russian: Verkhne-ienisseïskaïa), now very rare, and the Tuva carriage horse (Russian: Touvinskaïa oupriajnaïa), now extinct.

The Tuva horse has an elongated body and thick manes, and most often wears classic coats such as bay and chestnut. Particularly robust and hardy, they are bred for saddle, meat and mare milk. It is practically unknown outside its native region.

== History ==
The breed owes its name to its breeding region: Tuva. The presence of domestic horses in this region is attested as early as the 6th century BC, thanks to the discovery of over two hundred horses buried in the Scythian necropolis of Arjan. The animals found in ancient times were quite small and similar to the Mongolian horse. The breed is therefore probably of Mongolian origin, as this country borders Scythe. A comparative genetic analysis of Russian horse breeds suggests that the Tuva has long lived in great isolation, more so than other horses of Eastern Europe and Asia.

In the 19th and 20th centuries

Until the 19th century, Tuva's inhabitants were nomads, relying on livestock breeding and hunting. Around 1860, migrants from Altai and Minusinsk brought with them Kuznet draft horses and heavy-model trotters. Ore mining in Tuva required powerful horses. At the end of the 19th century and the beginning of the next, this led to the creation of farms with up to several thousand horses in a herd. These work horses are still used in the region in the 20th century for a variety of tasks. During World War II, Tuva's inhabitants contributed to the Russian war effort, supplying around 50 000 horses to the army.

From 1980 to 1990, a Soviet intervention program made it possible to study the remaining animals with the aim of preserving the notable genetic heritage in order select horses useful for agricultural work.

Tuva carriage horse and Upper Yenisei horse

With the re-establishment of agriculture in Tuva in 1944, the various outdoor horses were mixed together. The animal that emerged from these crossbreeds was called the "Tuva carriage horse" (Russian: Tuvinskaya upryajnava), and was granted a standard and studbook in 1951. The breed declined rapidly with the increasing use of tractors. The main stud was closed in 1957, just six years after it opened. Local horses are also crossed with light Thoroughbreds and Russian Don horses, leading to the emergence of a second, different type in the center of the region, the Upper Yenisei horse (Russian: Verkhne-eniseiskaya), named after the Upper Yenisei river. The Guide Delachaux indicates that the Upper-Yenisei horse is also called the "Tuva trait", while the DAD-IS website distinguishes the Tuvinskaya upryajnava from the Verkhne-eniseiskaya, as does the CAB International book, published in the same year, 2016.

== Description ==
The FAO (Food and Agriculture Organization of the United Nations) classifies the Tuva horse as a Siberian pony, despite it being closer to the Mongolian horse. According to studies by Bonnie Lou Hendricks from the University of Oklahoma and CAB International, its average height ranges from 1.30 m to 1.37 m. The Guide Delachaux cites a much smaller size, from 1.27 m to 1.29 m. The Upper Yenisei horse is larger, around 1.57 m according to Hendricks, 1.45 m to 1.52 m according to the Guide Delachaux, and has a more massive trotter-trait pattern.

The Tuva horse's body is elongated, and its manes are very dense. This small horse can cope with an extremely harsh biotope and wide temperature ranges, giving it stamina and robustness.

The most common colors are bay in all its shades, black, chestnut and gray, but many other colors are also represented.

== Usage ==
Tuva horses are mainly ridden, as the Tuvan people are horse riders. They ride horses to raise livestock, especially sheep. Mares are used for their milk, and their meat is consumed locally. The Upper Yenisei horse is also bred for its meat, but it is mainly used to draw vehicles and used for harness farming. The Tuvan people practice hippophagy, the consumption of horses, which is ritualized and associated with a symbolic meaning that leads to the consumption of the animal considered most valuable.

== The spread of breeding ==
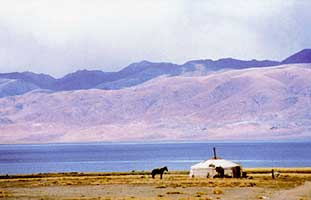
Horse and yurt in Uvs nuur.

The Tuva horse is almost unknown outside its native region, the Republic of Tuva, and is considered rare, although by the end of the 20th century, the region had 30,000 horses, and breeding was common in all 12 districts. In 1995, the breed was listed as "rare" by the FAO, but no count was available. The one published in 2003 counted a population of just 1 560 head. The number of horses free from crossbreeding with the Russian Don and the Budyonny horses is undoubtedly low, but there are still uncrossed Tuva horses in certain areas with particularly harsh biotopes, due to the lack of adaptation of the crossbred horses.

== See also ==
- List of horse breeds

== Bibliography ==
- Hendricks, Bonnie Lou (2007). International Encyclopedia of Horse Breeds (2nd ed.). Norman: University of Oklahoma Press. ISBN 978-0-8061-3884-8.
- Porter, Valerie; Alderson, Lawrence; Hall, J. G.; Sponenberg, Dan Phillip (2016). Mason's World Encyclopedia of Livestock Breeds and Breeding (6th ed.). CAB International. ISBN 978-1-84593-466-8.
- Rousseau, Élise (2016). Guide des chevaux d'Europe (in French). Delachaux et Niestlé. ISBN 978-2-603-02437-9.
