= Kalmyk =

Kalmyk (Kalmyk: Хальмг, romanized: Xaľmg), "Kalmuck", "Kalmuk", or "Kalmyki"' may refer to:

- Kalmyk people or Kalmyks, a group of western Mongolic people
- Kalmyk language, the language of the Kalmyk people
- Kalmykia, a Russian republic
- Kalmyk Khanate, a historic state
- Kalmyk cattle, beef cattle breed originating with Kalmyk people
- Kalmyk horse, horse breed originating with the Kalmyk people

== See also ==
- Operation Kalmyk, a 2012 British police operation
