= Chernomor (disambiguation) =

The Chernomor (Russian: черномор) is a Russian breed of saddle horse.

Chernomor (Russian: Черномор) may also refer to:

- The evil wizard in Pushkin's Ruslan and Ludmila and works based on it
- The leader of sea bogatyrs in Pushkin's The Tale of Tsar Saltan
- Chernomor dirigible the Russian name of the series of 4 blimps of Coastal class bought by Russia from the Great Britain
- Chornomor in the 2018 Ukrainian 3D animated fantasy film The Stolen Princess based on Ruslan and Ludmila
