= Karabakh horse =

Horse breed

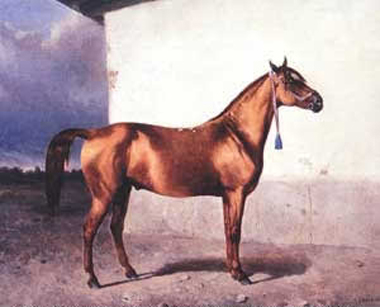

Traits
- Height: 14.1 to 15.2 hands

The Karabakh (Azerbaijani: Qarabağ atı) is a mountain-steppe racing and riding horse breed. It is named after the Karabakh region, from which the breed originates. The breed is noted for its good temperament and speed; in 2004, a Karabakh horse named Kishmish from an Aghdam stud farm covered 1,000 metres (3,300 ft) in 1.09 minutes and 1,600 metres (5,200 ft) in 1.52 minutes.

The Karabakh is thought to be influenced by Persian horses and the Akhal-Teke, Kabarda, Turkoman and Arabian breeds, and it influenced the development of the Russian Don during the 19th century. It is bred primarily in Azerbaijan's Shaki region. The breed numbers below 1,000, and it is threatened with extinction.

== History ==
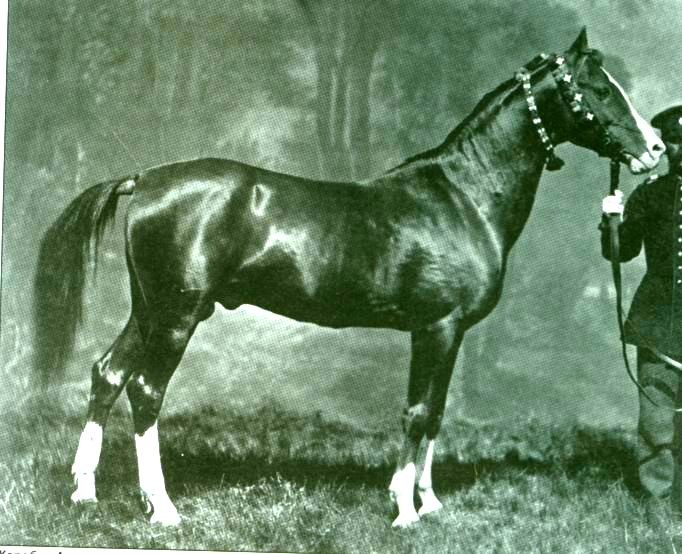
Alyetmez, from the stud of Khurshidbanu Natavan, at the second All-Russian Exhibition in 1867

The Karabakh region was known for the quality of its horses; the classical historian Strabo describes the Armenian province of “Orchistene" as supplying the kingdom with the "most cavalry."

The breed acquired its present characteristics during the 18th and 19th centuries. In Transcaucasia, Karabakh Khanate was known as a place for breeding of horses. Factory of the khanate was the main farm of purebred horses, which were not held for sale, but were only presented as gifts. According to Diterikhs, in 1797, right after the death of Agha Mohammad, Ibrahim Khalil Khan got his stable.

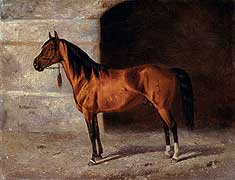
1865 Nikolai Sverchkov painting of the Karabakh stallion Khan

Karabakh numbers sharply decreased again during the early 20th century. The breed experienced another setback during the First Nagorno-Karabakh War. Before the 1993 capture of Agdam by Armenian forces, most of the Karabakh horses were moved from the Agdam stud. They are currently bred in winter pastures on the lowland Karabakh plains between Barda and Agjabadi.

=== During the years of Russian Empire ===
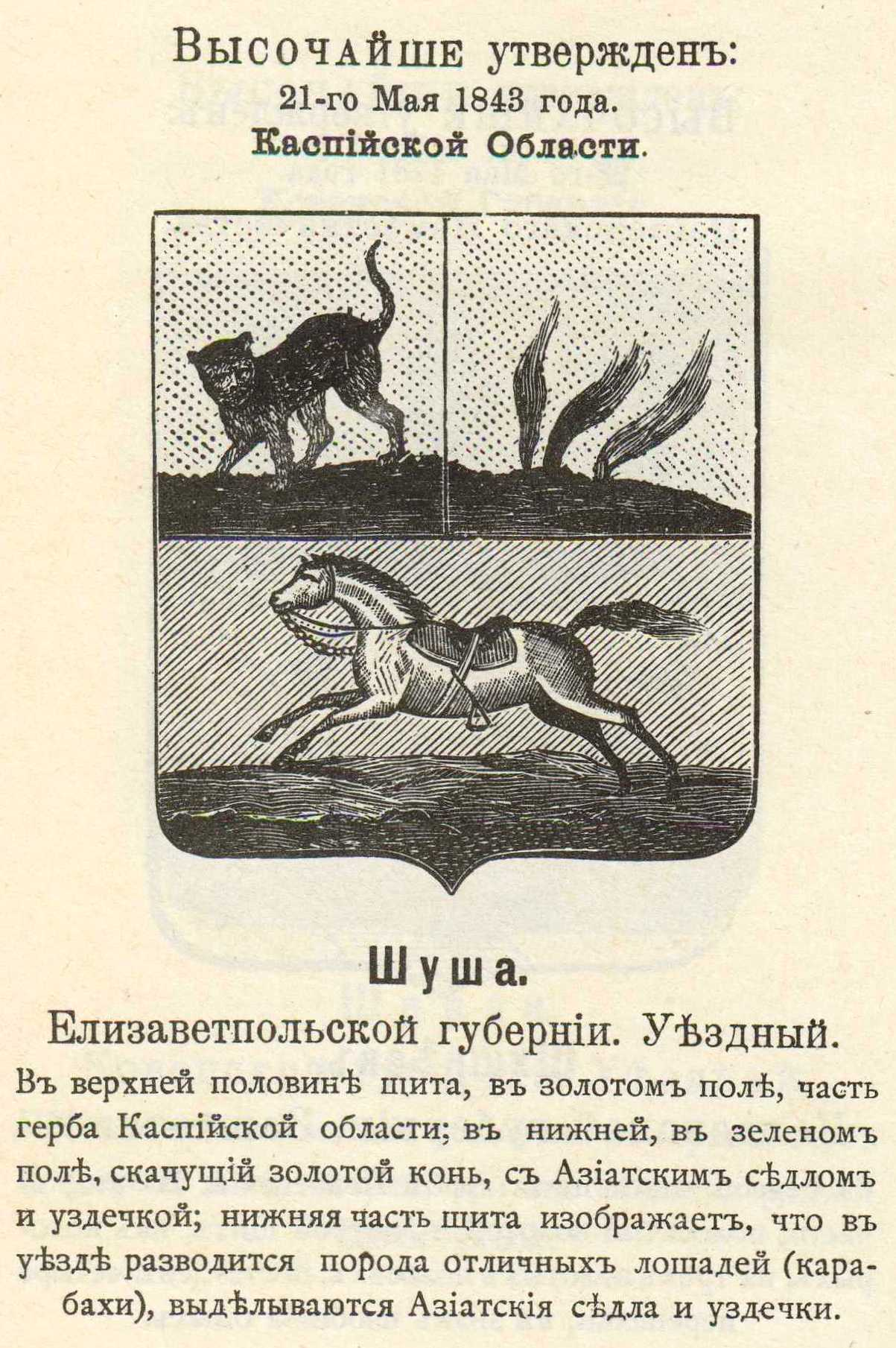
Coat of arms of Shusha with Karabakh horse depicted on it.

In 1805 Karabakh became part of Russia. Mehdigulu Khan, who ruled after Ibragim Khan, was not interested in the development of stud farms. As a consequence the quantity of khan horses was decreasing. In 1822, Mehdigulu Khan ran away to Persia, and his best horses were presented as gifts to his close people. Unlike Mehdigulu Khan, his daughter Khurshidbanu Natavan was actively engaged in the development of stud farms. Natavan's Karabakh horses took part in the Exposition Universelle (1867), agricultural exhibition in Moscow (1869), in Tbilisi (1882) and were awarded golden medals and certificates of honour. Karabakh horses were also awarded at the Second All-Russian Exhibition in 1869: Meymun – silver medal, Tokmak – bronze medal. At the Exposition Universelle (1867) in Paris, Khan got a silver medal.

According to modern Azerbaijani sources, not only Khan's daughter, but also many Karabakh bays owned stud farms. Among them were Ugurlu Bay, Jafargulu Khan, Rustam Bay Behbudov, Kerim-aga Javanshir, Shamil bay and others. Overall in the middle of the 19th century, there were 11 stud farms, with 250 stallions and 1450 fillies.

Karabakh horses were used by Russian officers who served in the Caucasus. Russian poet Aleksandr Pushkin, who traveled to Arzurum in 1829, wrote in his travel notes that young Russian officers were riding Azerbaijani horses. On 21 May 1843, the coat of arms of Shusha was approved and Karabkh horse was depicted on it.

=== In the Soviet Union ===
In 1948, the Soviets began a breeding program which included the use of nine Arabian stallions, as no pure Karabakh stallions were available at the time.

=== During the years of Azerbaijan Republic ===
Karabakh horses are bred at two stud farms: in the village of Lambaran of the Barda region, and in Agstafa. Private stud farms exist in line with state enterprises. Because of the First Nagorno-Karabakh War, the number of horses significantly decreased. This happened because horses were often moved from one place to another and pregnant fillies experienced miscarriages. Moreover, horses were bred in unsatisfactory conditions.

The traditional Karabakh horse-riding game of chovqan was included in the UNESCO Intangible Cultural Heritage List in 2013. The export of Karabakh horses has been banned since 2015 and the Azerbaijani Ministry of Agriculture focuses on the breeding of the small number of remaining horses.

On 13 February 2017, the Organisational Committee of the Islamic Solidarity Games introduced as mascots the Karabakh horses Inca and Casur.

=== Modern times ===
The Karabakh horse is the national animal of Azerbaijan and the official symbol of the Agdam and Shaki districts. The horse, of great cultural importance to the people of Azerbaijan, appears in literature and on postage stamps. Qarabağ FK's logo contains two rearing horses, based on the Karabakh horse.

According to Kurban Said's novel Ali and Nino, "I looked at the horse and was struck numb. There stood the red-golden miracle of Karabakh ... one of the twelve golden horses in the whole world ..." A horse in Karabakh is described in Mikhail Lermontov's poem, "Demon".

In 2012, the breed appeared at the Royal Windsor Horse Show to perform at the Diamond Jubilee of Elizabeth II. A monument to the Karabakh horse was unveiled in Belgium in March 2017, and the Karabakh was the mascot of the 2017 Islamic Solidarity Games.

On May 16, 2022, Queen Elizabeth II was presented with a Karabakh horse named Shohrat (Glory) as gift from President Ilham Aliyev of Azerbaijan.

== Characteristics ==
The Karabakh is hardy, strong, tough and sure-footed, standing 138–140 cm (13.2–13.3 hands) high. It has a small, well-defined head, a straight profile with a broad forehead, and large nostrils. The neck is set high, average in length, muscular and elegant. It has a compact body, with well-defined and well-developed muscles. The shoulder is often upright. The horse has a sloping croup and long, fine, strong legs with small joints. Its chest is narrow and it is not very deep through the girth, due to the Akhal-Teke influence.

The skin is thin and soft, with a shiny coat. The main colors are chestnut and bay, with a characteristic golden tint; some are gray, and palominos and buckskins are rare. White markings are permitted. As well as being fast and agile, the Karabakh is known for its endurance and loyalty.

They are known for their endurance as the 19th century French Geographer Reclus Elisée describes in his book L'Homme et la terre (The Earth and its Inhabitants) their strength as: "The Karabakh horses, however, which climb the cliffs like goats, are said to be the finest in Transcaucasia"

== See also ==
- Azerbaijan horse
- Chernomor (horse)
