= Chernomor horse =

Russian horse breed description

Chernomor
- Country of origin: Russia
- Use: riding horse

Traits
- Height: 1.52–1.57 m
- Color: generally bay, black or chestnut

The Chernomor (Russian: черномор) is a Russian breed of saddle horse originating from the Krasnodar Krai and Rostov Oblast, near the Black Sea in Russia. The Chernomor was originally bred from crosses between the mounts of Zaporozhian Cossacks and Kazakh nomads in the late 18th century. The breed was then influenced by crosses with various saddle horses, such as the Russian Don and the Karabakh. After the World War I, Chernomor breeding was weakened and merged with that of the Budyonny breed.

The Chernomor is a calm, sturdy, medium-sized saddle horse that exists in three types more or less influenced by crossbreeding. The breed is now considered very rare, if not extinct in its original form due to too many crosses.

== Designation ==
Several names are used to designate the breed. The Russian name is Chernomorskaya (literally: "from the Black Sea"), transcribed as "Chernomor" in English, and "Tchernomor" in French. It is sometimes referred to as the "Black Sea Horse" (terminology chosen by the 2016 edition of the CAB International dictionary to replace "Chernomor").

== History ==
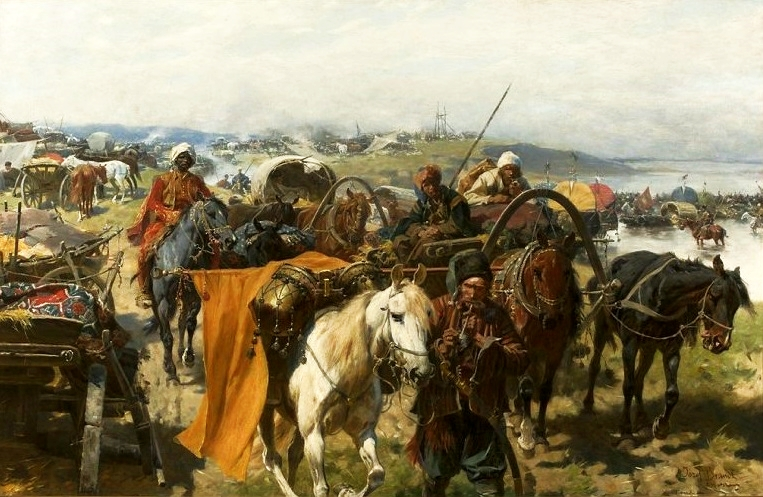
16th- or 17th-century Zaporozhian Cossacks by Józef Brandt (1841–1915)

The Chernomor originated in the late 18th century, when Kazakh nomads moved to Kuban in 1792. There they discovered a local saddle horse, the Nogai, or old Kuban horse, now extinct, as well as mountain saddle horses, which they crossed with their own stock of Arabian-influenced saddle horses and Turkish and Persian horses. The Chernomor is thus partly derived from the mounts of the Zaporozhian Cossacks. In the 19th and 20th centuries, the breed was influenced by the Thoroughbred, the Russian Don and the Karabakh. The Chernomor became a larger saddle horse, more renowned than its ancestors.

The development of agriculture and sheep breeding in the second half of the 19th century led to the arrival of draft horses in the region. At the same time, numerous stud farms were set up to supply the Russian army with saddle horses. They used Russian Don stallions, Thoroughbreds and Orlov-Rostopchins, more rarely the Orlov Trotter, which they crossed with Chernomor and Karabakh mares. The Chernomor, smaller and hardier, lives on in taboos. A massive export of horses to Romania before the World War I weakened breeding. Only a handful of horses remained in private stud farms. From 1921 to 1923, the surviving Chernomors were brought together in a stud farm (named "Primor-Achtar" according to Hendricks of the University of Oklahoma, "Kuban-Chernomorski" and then "Voskhod" according to a study carried out for the FAO), but the closure of this stud farm led to the dispersal of the remaining stock among various breeding farms for the army.

The breed disappeared through crossbreeding with the Budyonny, the Russian Don and the Ukrainian Saddle. It is considered to be one of the ancestors of the Budyonny, resulting from crosses between Russian Don and Chernomor mares and Thoroughbred stallions from the 1920s onwards. The original stock of the Budyonny breed comprises 657 mares, 261 of which are Anglo-Russian Don-Chernomor crosses, and 37 Anglo-Chernomor crosses.

== Description ==
This saddle horse is renowned for its good looks. According to the Guide Delachaux, its height ranges from 1.52 m to 1.54 m, while the 2016 edition of the CAB International encyclopedia cites a height of 1.52 m to 1.57 m. Its appearance is reminiscent of the Russian Don, but smaller, lighter and livelier. The breed is divided into three types: a light draft, a light saddle horse showing the influence of the Arab, the Russian Don and the Thoroughbred, and the local mountain type. The head is medium-sized, with a straight or slightly convex profile. The neck is straight and of medium length, the withers not very well defined. The back and rump form an almost straight line, and the body is well muscled.

The most common coats are dark bay and black, more rarely chestnut with golden highlights. The latter is typical of certain Russian and Central Asian horse breeds, such as the Russian Don, the Budyonny and the Chernomor.

The Chernomor is renowned for its calm demeanor and good stamina.

== Usage ==
It is mainly used for work as a saddle horse, being reputedly capable of covering 60 miles in a day while carrying a rider. The breed has also been used for farm work and harnessed transport.

== Breeding spread ==
The original cradle of this breed is in the North Caucasus, around Krasnodar. The Chernomor was listed as extinct by the FAO in 2000.

However, Bonnie Lou Hendricks (University of Oklahoma, 1995 and 2007) reports that the breed survives in small numbers in Krasnodar Krai and Rostov Oblast. The 2002 edition of CAB International's encyclopedia listed the breed as "almost extinct"; the 2016 edition lists it as "rare", noting that the Black Sea horse has been largely absorbed by crossbreeding.

== Bibliography ==
- Hendricks, Bonnie Lou (2007). International Encyclopedia of Horse Breeds (2nd ed.). Norman: University of Oklahoma Press. ISBN 978-0-8061-3884-8.
- Porter, Valerie; Alderson, Lawrence; Hall, Stephen; Sponenberg, Dan (2016). Mason's World Encyclopedia of Livestock Breeds and Breeding (6th ed.). CAB International. ISBN 978-1-84593-466-8.
- Rousseau, Élise (2016). Guide des chevaux d'Europe (in French). Delachaux et Niestlé. ISBN 978-2-603-02437-9.
