= Anglo-Kabarda =

Breed of horse

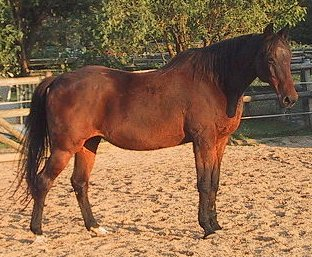
- Anglo-Kabarda mare
- Country of origin: Russia

The Anglo-Kabarda or Anglo-Kabardin (also known as the Anglo-Kabardinskaya porodnaya gruppa) is a breed of horse that is a cross between the Kabarda and the Thoroughbred.

== Characteristics ==
Representatives of the breed may have between 25 percent and 75 percent Thoroughbred blood. The Anglo-Kabarda is divided into three different types: "basic," "oriental" and "massive." Horses belonging to the basic type are of medium size with a well-shaped head and are well muscled; those of the oriental type are smaller and lighter, they have smaller heads with large expressive eyes and smaller ears and clean legs; the massive type are heavier and taller with a build similar to carriage horses. These horses usually stand between 15.2 and 16 hands (62 and 64 inches, 157 and 163 cm) tall. They have legs which are long and strong with well-developed joints giving them the speed of the Thoroughbred and the resistance of the Kabarda. The breed's temperament is considered spirited and energetic but very reliable. This breed is generally hardy, although due to the Thoroughbred blood, they may not necessarily be easy keepers and may require some supplemental nutrition.

== History ==
The cross was developed beginning in the 1920s and 1930s to produce a horse that was larger and faster than the native Kabarda, but adapted to the climate of the northern Caucasus region of Russia and able to maneuver in mountainous terrain.

== Use ==
This breed has been used as saddle horses both locally in the Caucasus Mountains and to compete in international Olympic events.
