= Qatgani =

Breed of horse

- Other names: Qataghani
- Country of origin: Afghanistan

The Qatgani or Qataghani is a horse breed from the former Qataghan province of Afghanistan. It is one of twelve Afghan horse breeds reported to the DAD-IS database of livestock breeds.

The Uzbek mounted raiders of the warlord Abdul Rashid Dostum, who in early 2001 harried the Taliban forces in the Darya Suf valley of north-east Afghanistan, rode Qatgani horses.
