= Lokai =

Breed of horse

The Lokai, a mountain horse bred in Tajikistan, is used as a riding horse, a packhorse, or even sometimes a light draft horse. Although small, the breed is agile and hardy. The breed was developed by crossing native mountain horses with a mixture of Central Asian and European bloodlines.

== History ==
The Lokai was developed in the mountainous areas of central and southern Tajikistan, where it was developed to be an agile, hardy pack and riding horse. The breed has been in development since the 16th century, when Uzbek Lokai tribesmen began improving the local horses with a mixture of Central Asian breeds, including contributions from the Iomud, Karabair, Turkmene and Akhal-Teke breeds. Later, Arabian stallions from Bukhara and Thoroughbred and Tersk horses were used to improve the breed.

== Breed characteristics ==
The Lokai have well-proportioned heads with straight or slightly convex profiles, set on a long, well-formed neck and sloping, muscular shoulders. The withers are prominent, running into a straight, short back and sloping croup. The legs are solid, clean, and well-muscled. The Lokai generally stands between 14 and 14.2 hands (56 and 58 inches, 142 and 147 cm), and is usually chestnut (often with golden highlights), bay, or gray, although they are occasionally black or dun. Some of the horses have a curly coat. The breed tends to mature late, especially when raised in their native habitats. When bred and reared in good stable conditions, with improved feed and management, they mature faster and grow larger than their more native counterparts.

Currently, the Lokai is being crossed with Arabian and Thoroughbred horses to create a new type of saddle horse in Tajikistan.

== Uses and purposes ==
Lokais have been used for a variety of purposes throughout the years. These horses provide transport over precipitous mountain country, they are raced, they are used in the game of kokpar, and they are often employed as a pack animal. The Lokai horse is even sometimes used as a draft horse.
