= Adaev =

Administrative division of the Kazakh Autonomous Socialist Soviet Republic

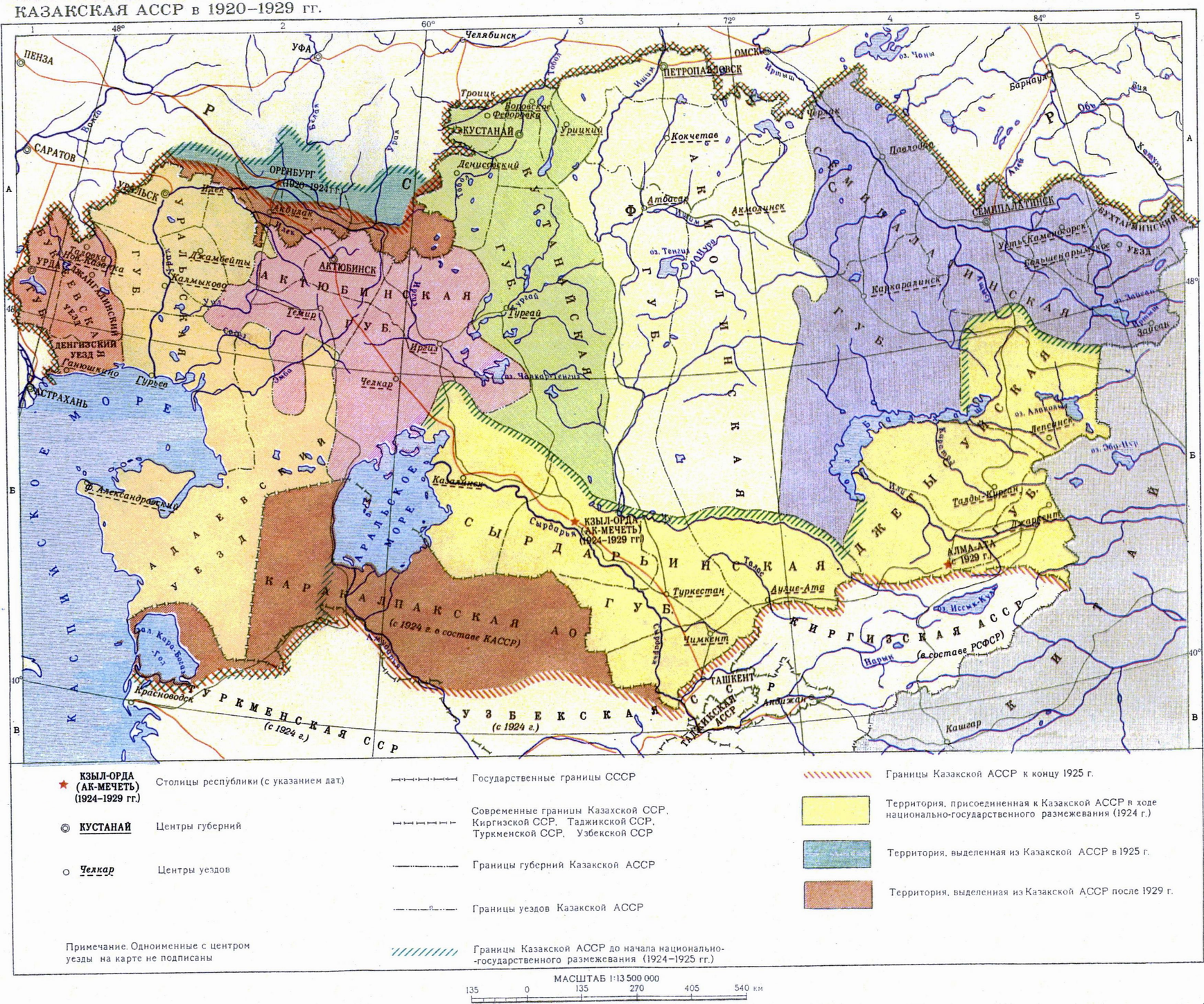
Subdivisions of the Kazakh ASSR, 1920–1929; Adaev on the eastern shore of the Caspian Sea

Adaev was an administrative division (uyezd) of the Kazakh Autonomous Socialist Soviet Republic, corresponding in part to the Kazakh portion of the former Transcaspian Oblast, and to the present-day Mangystau Region of the Republic of Kazakhstan. In 1926, it comprised 27 volosts, with 174 villages, overwhelmingly Kazakh in ethnic composition. The administrative capital of the province was Fort Alexandrovsk, on the Mangyshlak Peninsula. In 1928 the territory of the republic was reorganized into 13 okrugs, of which Adaev was one; it was abolished in a further reorganization in 1929.
