= Kabarda horse =

Russian breed of horse

Kabarda
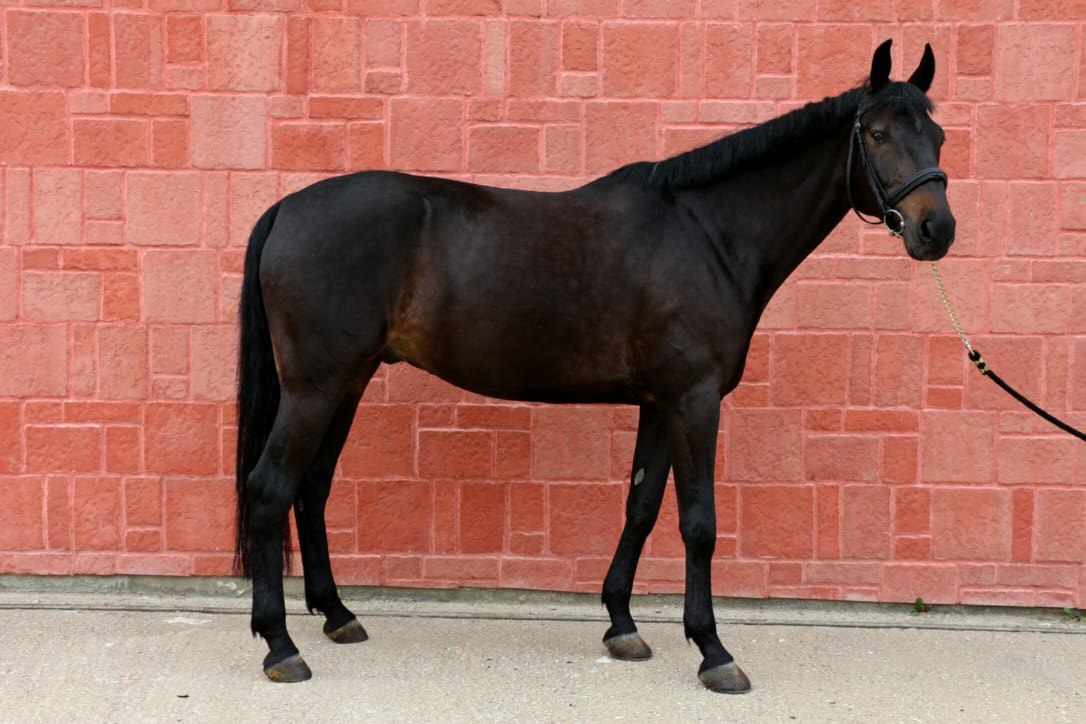
- Other names: Kabardin, Circassian
- Country of origin: Circassia: Kabardia (located in modern-day Russia)

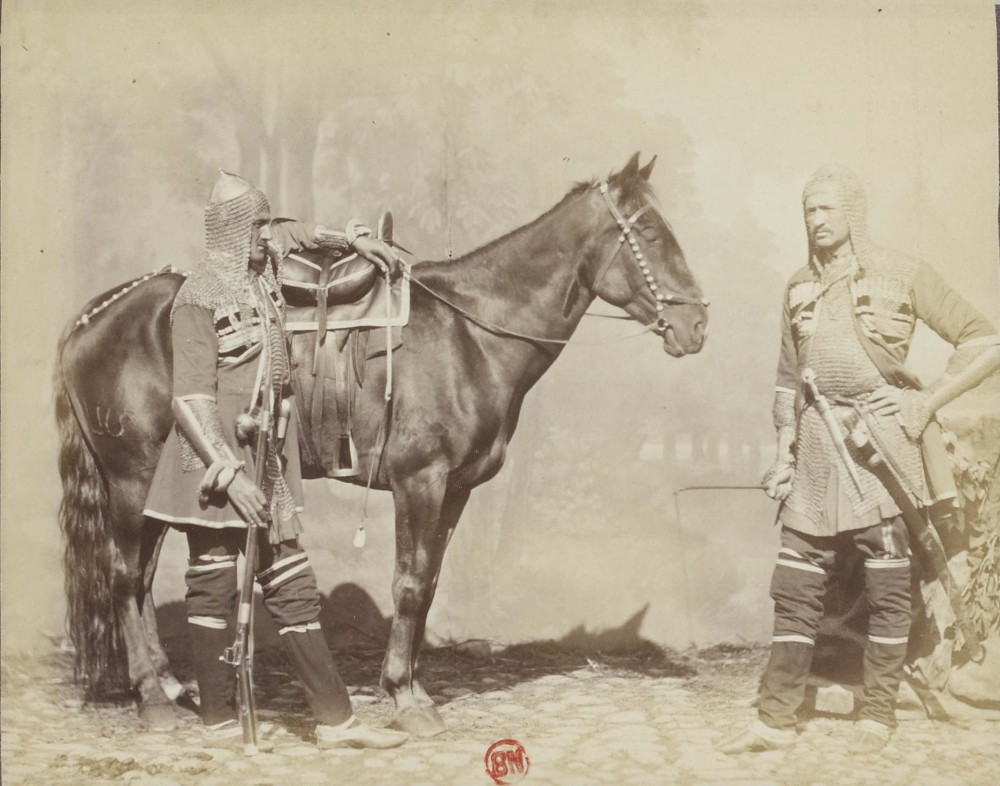
Circassian nobles and a Kabarda horse

The Kabardian horse, known in Kabardian as the Circassian horse (Kabardian: Адыгэш, lit. 'Circassian Horse'; also known as Shagdy, Adyghe: Шагъди), is a horse breed originating from Circassia. Historically, the breed has been known for at least 400 years. They are noted for their endurance and ease of adapting to harsh environments, particularly being well-adapted to mountainous conditions. It gets its name from the Kabardian subgroup of the Circassians. The Uzunyayla horse bred by Circassians in Turkey was formed as a crossbreed between this horse and Hungarian horses.

== History ==
The Kabarda horse has been bred by Circassian societies (especially the Kabardians) since the 16th century and is the product of centuries of selective breeding to survive in harsh conditions. The Kabarda breed was formed by a combination of steppe horses, Karabakh, Arabian, and Turkoman horses. The breed is usually kept in herds and moved between mountain pastures in the summer and foothills in the winter.

Due to wars such as the Russo-Circassian War and especially the 1917 Russian Revolution, the number of Kabarda horses drastically decreased, and the breed came to the brink of extinction in the 1920s. Between 1935 and 1953, the purebred population averaged 446 stallions and 3272 mares. In the early twentieth century, a new breed called the Anglo-Kabarda was created by crossing Kabardas with Thoroughbreds, and the new breed was recognized in 1966. By the late 1980s, the number of purebred Kabarda mares dropped to between 400 and 450; these were mainly concentrated in the Malokarachaevski and Malkinski stud farms and other breeding farms in the Kabardino-Balkar region, including the Krasny Partizan collective farm in the Stavropol territory.

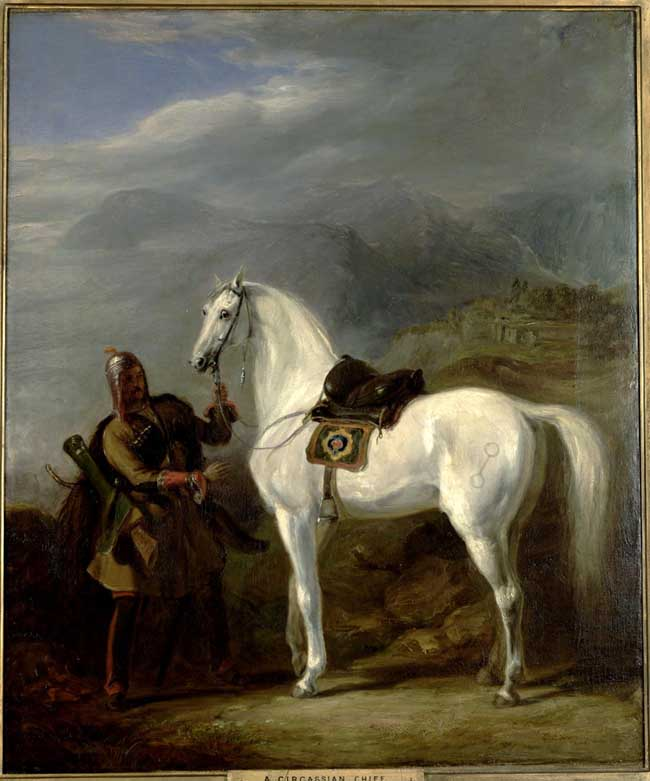
Sir William Allan "A Circassian Chief preparing his stallion" (1843)

== Breed characteristics ==
The Kabarda horse stands 14.1 hands high and has a bay, black, or gray coat. It is a solid, clean-built horse with a clean head, a well-muscled neck, medium-high withers, a deep chest, long, sloping shoulders, a short, solid back, and a muscular, slightly sloping croup. Its legs are clean and have well-developed joints and hard hooves.

The Kabarda horse's blood has a high oxygenation capacity, making it useful for work high in the mountains. The breed also has a tendency to accumulate fat quickly, which helps the horses when they are regularly exposed to extreme conditions, but can create difficulties for owners when the horses are kept stabled.

=== Subtypes ===
There are three main subtypes of the Kabarda breed:

- Basic type – This is the predominant type, a typical mountain riding horse that is tall but muscular.
- Oriental type – This type shows more Arabian influence with smaller heads, very clean legs, thinner skin, and hotter temperaments.
- Massive type – This type is larger and has a more robust bone structure similar to a typical carriage horse.

== Uses ==
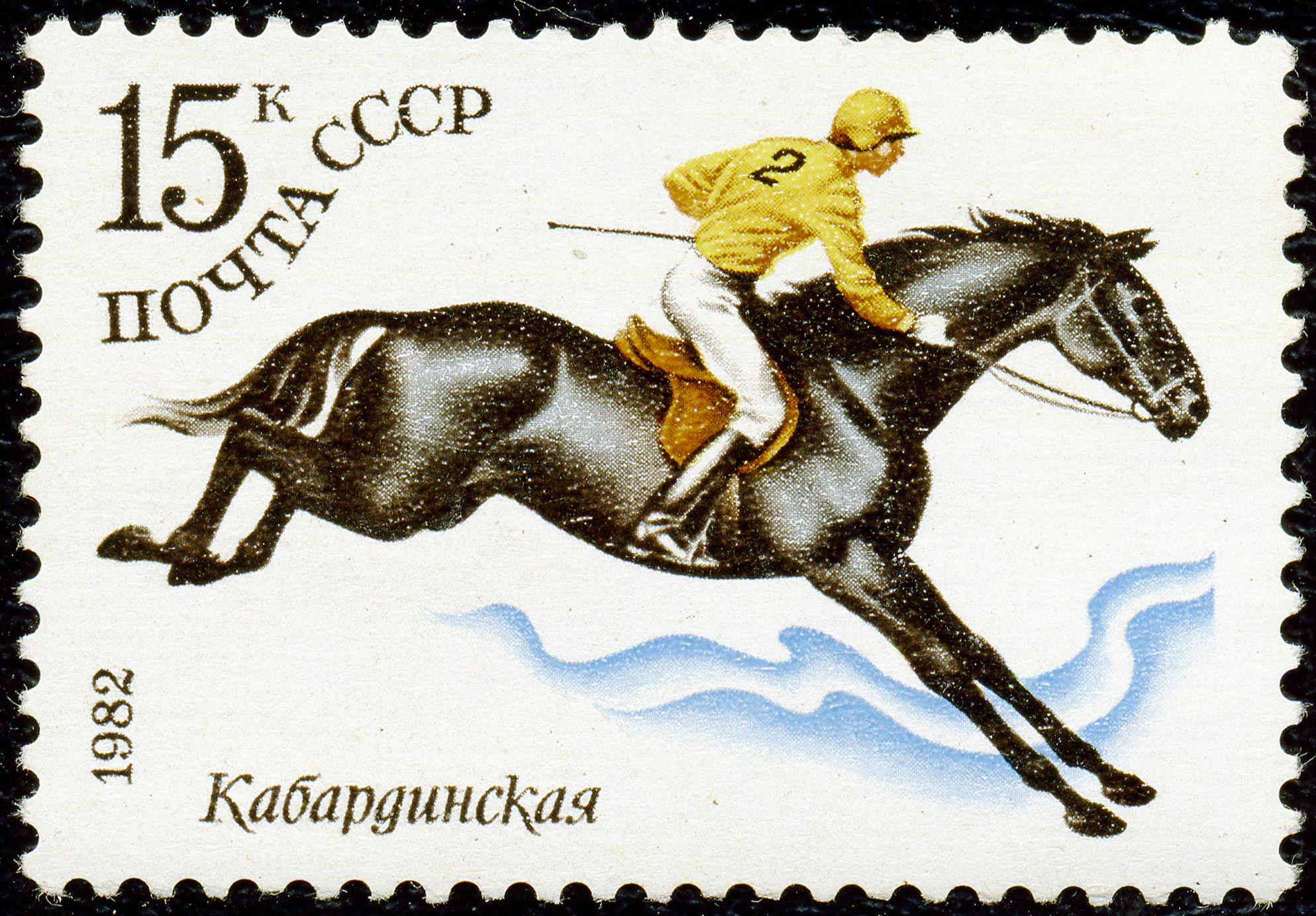
A USSR postage stamp featuring a Kabarda horse (1982, Kabardinskaya).

The Kabarda horse was bred for stony and mountainous terrain. The breed is usually fast and has good endurance. They are often used outside of Russia as sport horses and for the creation and improvement of other breeds such as the Anglo-Kabarda, Tersky, and native horses in Armenia, Azerbaijan, and Georgia. Although primarily used as a saddle horse, they also do well as harness and pack horses. The mountaineers of the Caucasus make hay on steep slopes by hitching Kabardas to horse-drawn mowers.
