= Bashkir horse =

Horse breed of Bashkortostan

Bashkir
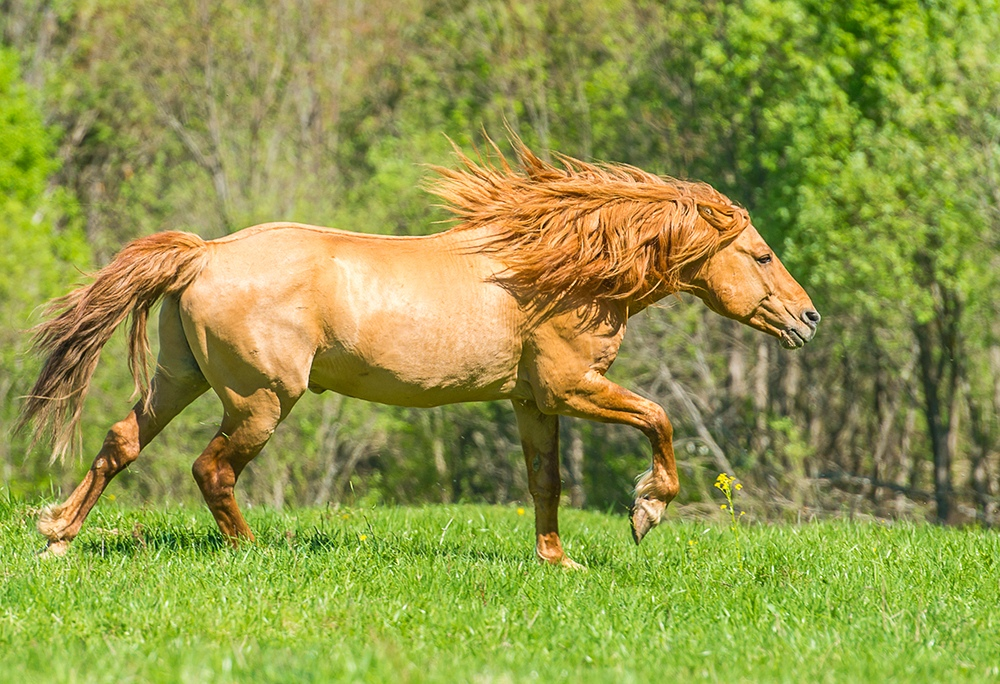
- Conservation status: FAO (2007): not at risk; DAD-IS (2022): unknown
- Other names: Bashkir: Башҡорт аты, romanized: Başqurt atı, Russian: Bashkirskaya
- Country of origin: Russian Federation
- Distribution: Bashkortostan
- Use: meat; milk; riding; draught, harness and pack work

Traits
- Height: Male: average: 143 cm; Female: average: 142 cm

The Bashkir or Bashkurt (Bashkir: Башҡорт аты, romanized: Başqort atı) is the horse breed of the Bashkir people. It is raised mainly within Bashkortostan, formerly known as Bashkiria, a republic within the Russian Federation which lies to the west of the southern Ural Mountains and extends to the Volga River. The principal centre of breeding is the capital, Ufa.

== History ==
The origins of the Bashkir horse are not known. In the nineteenth century its economic value was recognised, and steps were taken to increase both its working abilities and its traditional qualities as a producer of milk and meat. Breeding centres were set up in 1845.

The Bashkir horse has been crossed with other breeds of the former USSR such as the Russian Heavy Draught; experimental crosses with Kazakh and Yakut horses have also been made.

Bashkortostan has the third-highest horse population of the federal subjects of Russia, after the Altai Krai and the Sakha Republic. In 2003 the population of Bashkir horses was reported as 94470; by early 2011 it had risen to almost 137000.

== Characteristics ==
The Bashkir is a small horse, standing about 142 cm (14 h) at the withers. It is wide in the body and deep-chested, with a thoracic circumference (chest girth) averaging about 180 cm (70 in); it has a large head and a short neck, low withers and a flat back. The legs are short with heavy bone; cannon bone measurement may reach 20 cm (8 in). The most common coat colours are bay, chestnut, mouse grey and roan; striped dun also occurs. The mane and tail are thick and the coat is also thick and often curly. A two-year study published in 1990 found it unlikely that the American Bashkir Curly, which also has a curly coat, descends from the Bashkir breed.

There are two distinct types: a smaller, lighter mountain type used mainly for riding, and a somewhat heavier steppe type.

The horses are remarkably hardy. Herds may be managed extensively, and remain in the open in winter in snow and blizzard conditions where temperatures may reach −40 °C.

== Use ==
The Bashkir is used for riding and for pack, harness, draught and farm work. It shows remarkable endurance; there are reports of these horses drawing troikas, three-horse sleighs, over distances of 120–140 km (70–90 mi) per day.

Mares are abundant producers of milk. Average yield per year is 1500 or 2100 kg (4600 lb) in a lactation of 240 days, with the best mares reaching 2700 kg (6000 lb). Much of the milk is made into kumis; kumis-making is a national activity of the Bashkiri people.

Hair combed from the thick winter coat can be woven into cloth.

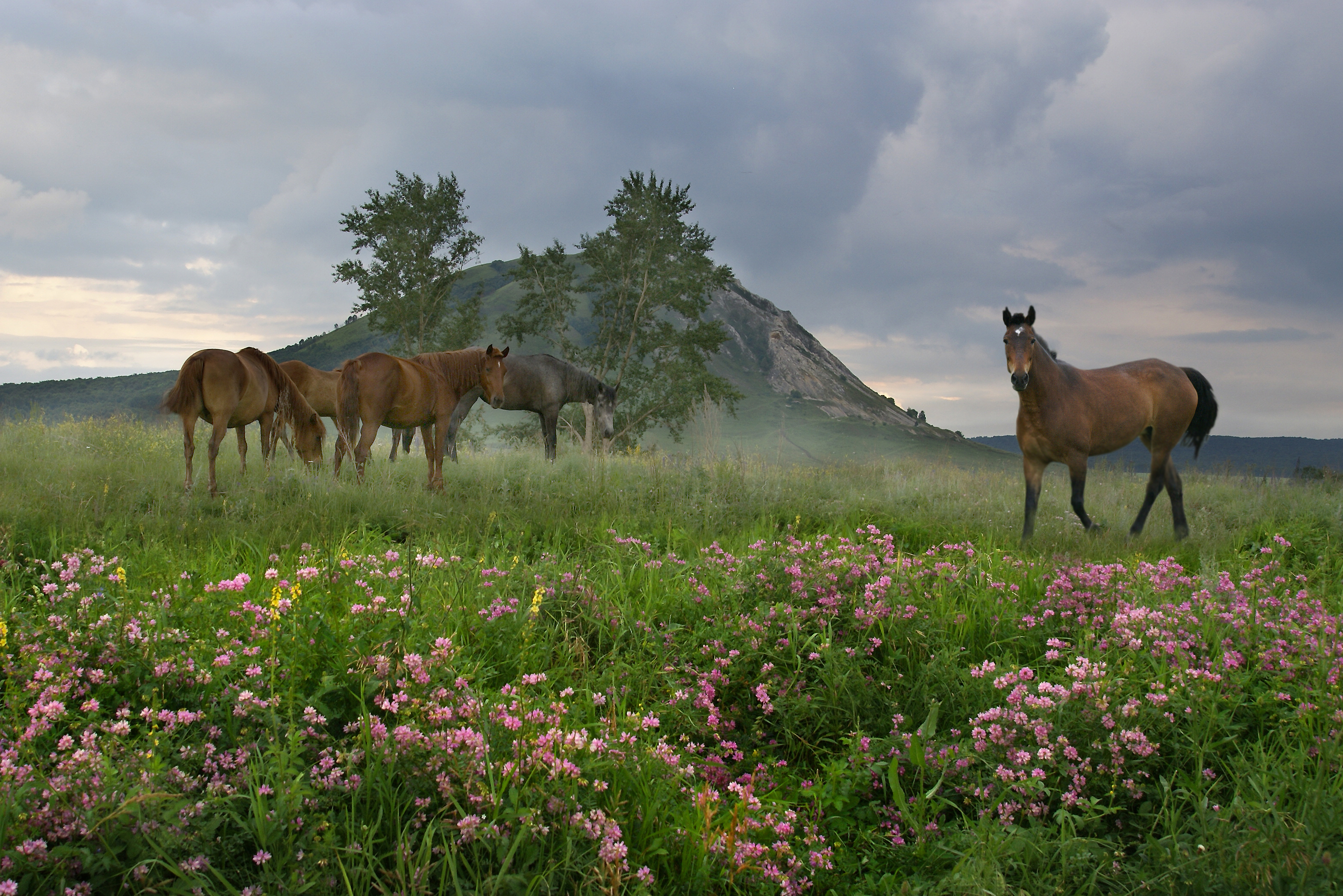
Horses at Tra-Tau Mountain in Ishimbaysky District

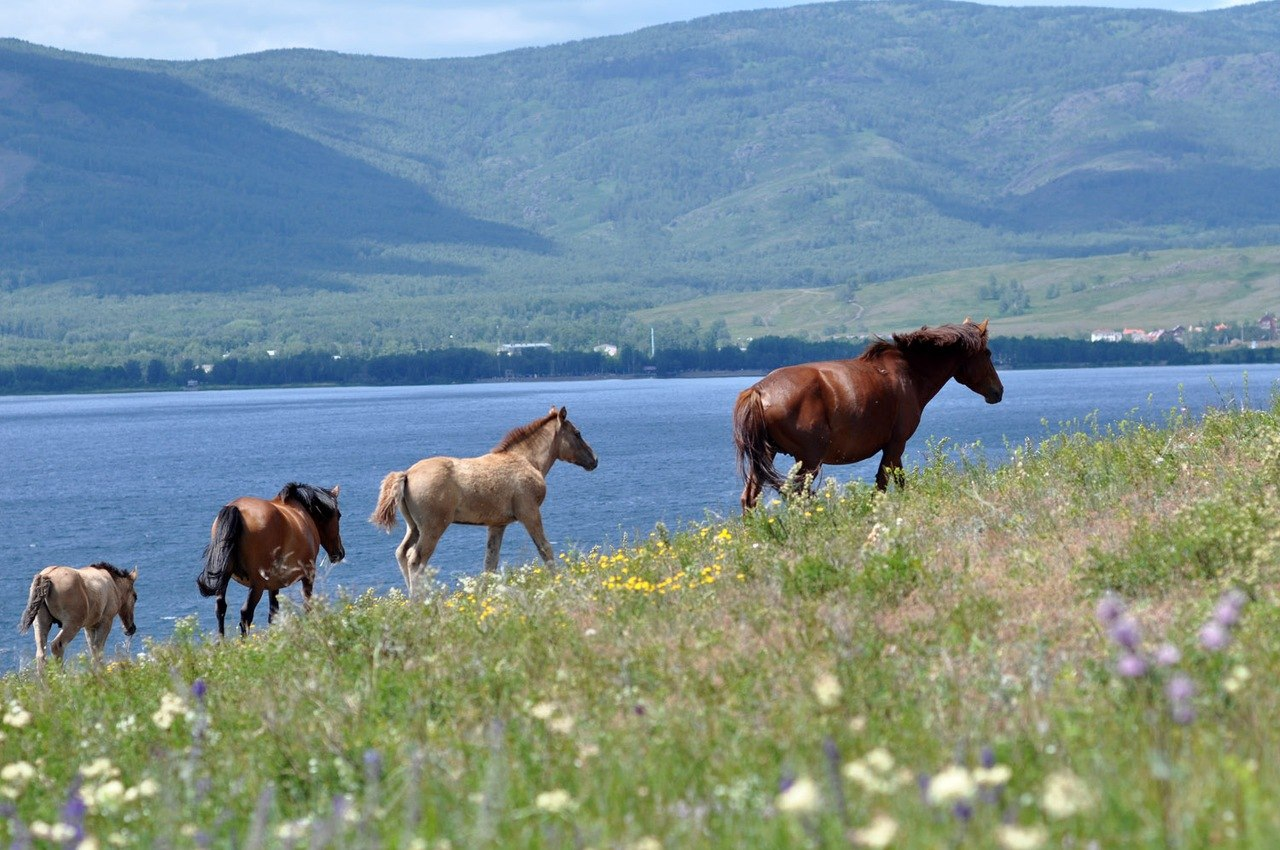
Horses in Abzelilovsky District

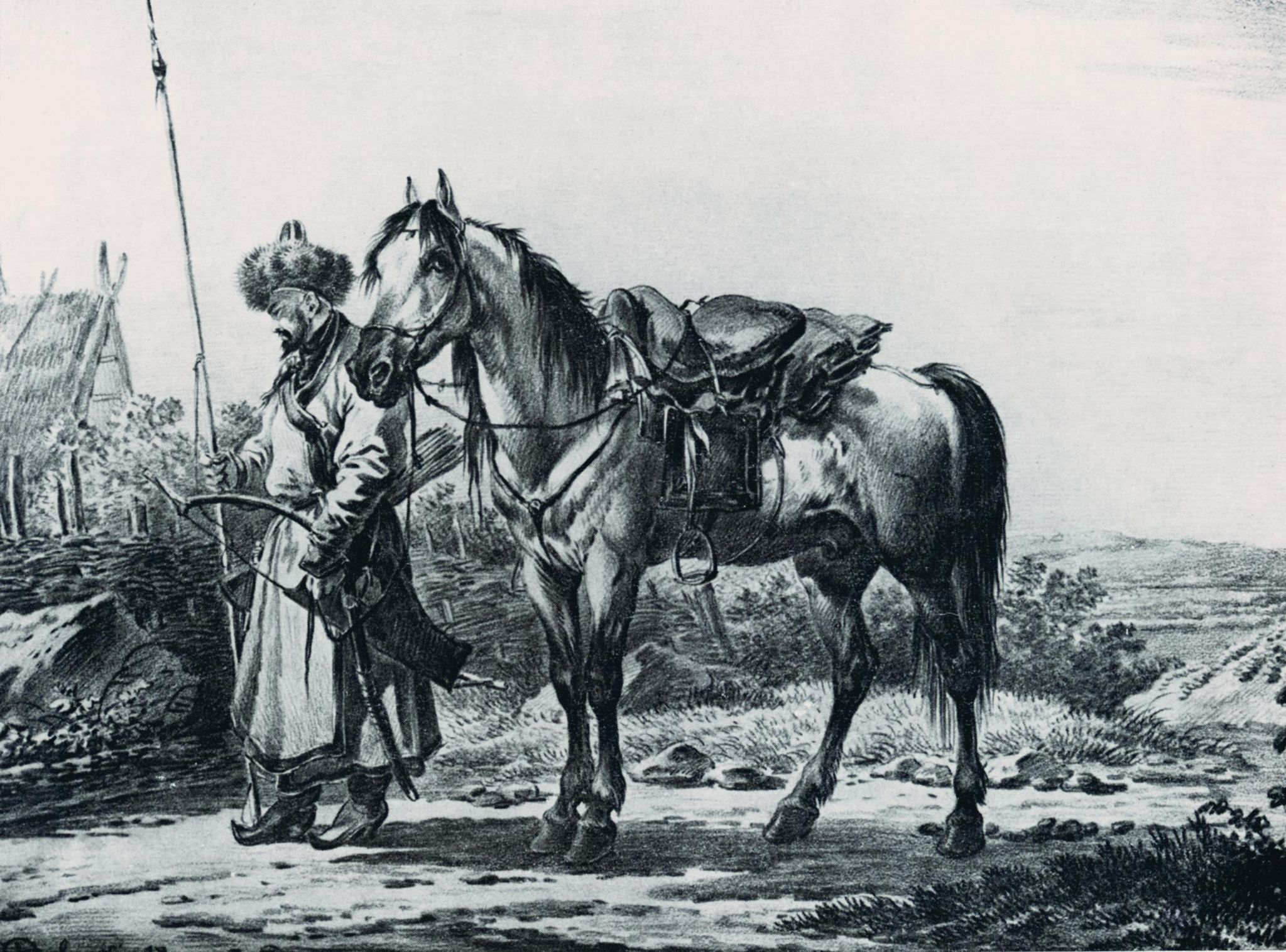
Bashkir horseman, by Aleksander Orłowski

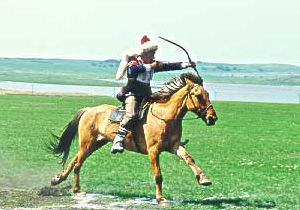
Bashkir horseman
