= Iomud =

Horse breed from Turkmenistan

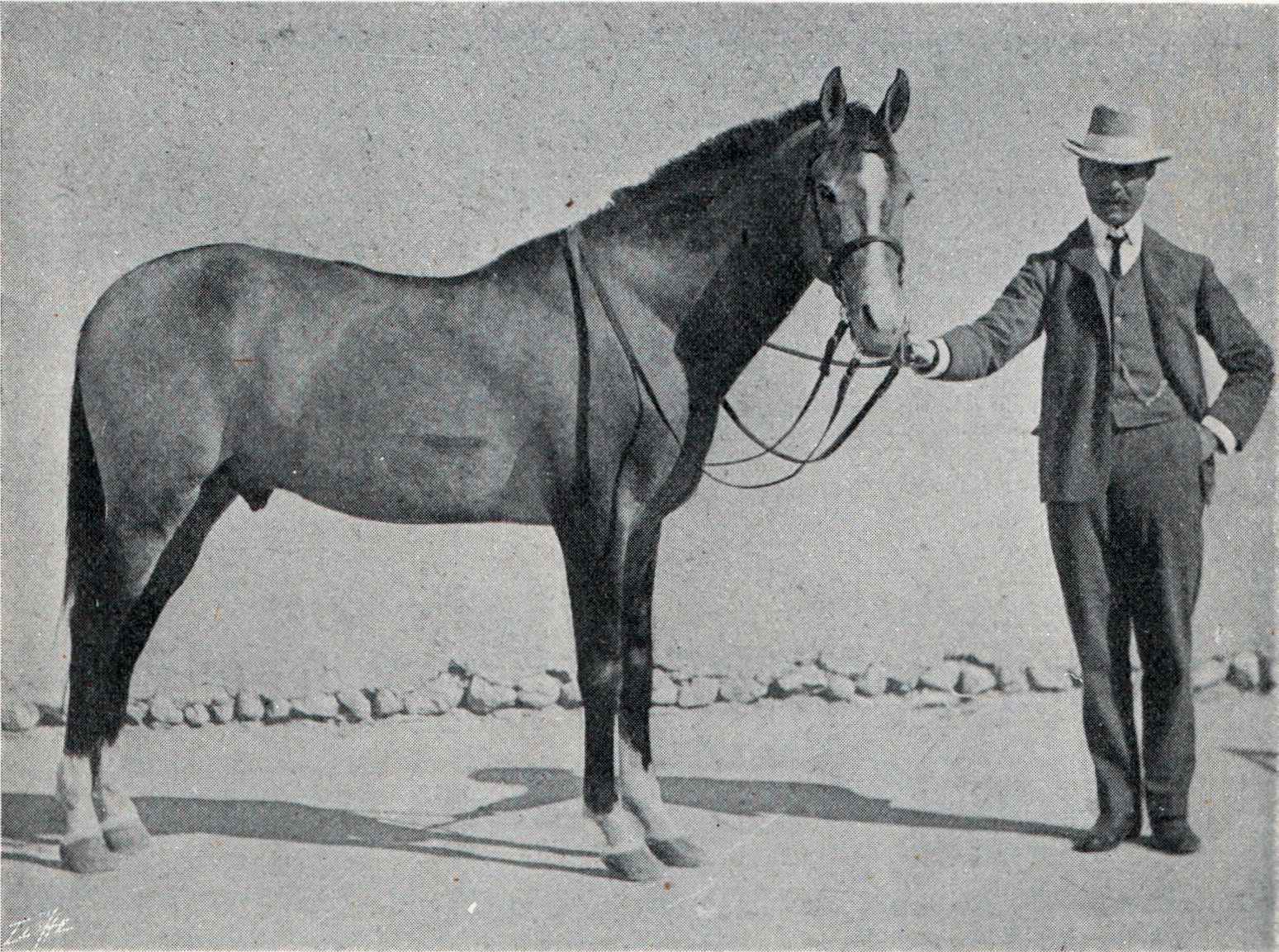
- Photograph from 1904
- Other names: Yomood; Jomud; Yomud; Yamut; Yamud; Russian: Iomudskaya
- Country of origin: Turkmenistan

Traits
- Height: Male: 152 cm; Female: 149 cm

Notes
- Conservation status: FAO (2007): not at risk

The Iomud is a breed of light horse from Turkmenistan. Like other breeds of Turkmen horse, it is named for the Turkmen tribe that bred it, the Iomud. Both the name of the horse and the name of the Turkmen clan may be spelt in many ways, including Iomud, Yomud, Yamud and Yomut. The Iomud horse is raised in Turkmenistan, particularly in the velayat of Daşoguz; in Uzbekistan; in Karakalpakstan (now part of Uzbekistan), particularly in the Khwarezm region; and in Iraq, Iran and Turkey. Unlike the Akhal-Teke, it usually kept in herds in desert or semi-desert areas.

== History ==
Like other breeds of Turkmen horse – including the Akhal-Teke, the Ersari, the Goklan, the Salor and the Sarik – the Iomud breed is named for the Turkmen tribe that formed it, the Yomut. The Yomut people occupy the northern part of modern Turkmenistan, from the eastern shores of the Caspian Sea in the west to the area of Daşoguz, on the northern edge of the Karakum Desert, in the north-east. They are principally concentrated in the regions of Balkan and Daşoguz, which are considered the area of origin of the Iomud.

The early history of the Iomud breed, like that of Turkmen horses in general, is not clear. The qualities of Turkmen horses, and the differences between the various breeds, were recognised by western travellers in the area in the eighteenth and nineteenth centuries. Clement Augustus de Bode wrote in 1848 that the Tekke horses had the best endurance, and were preferred to pure-bred Arabs, while the Iomud and the Goklan were faster and more lightly built.

In the twentieth century, numbers of the Iomud breed declined. In 1980, in the Soviet era, the total number was recorded as 964, of which 616 were considered pure-bred. In 1983 stud farms were set up with the aim of increasing the number of breeding mares from 140 to about 250. A conservation farm was also established in the Gyzyletrek district, in south-west Turkmenistan.

The Iomud contributed significantly to the development of the Lokai breed in Tajikistan.

== Characteristics ==
Iomud horses have remarkable endurance. According to local information collected in 1937, they could cover the 800 km from Daşoguz to Etrek in seven days. They can carry 120 kg without difficulty in mountain or desert terrain.

Iomud horses are usually grey or chestnut; golden chestnut and black can occur. Stallions stand about 152 cm (15 hands), mares a little less. Thoracic circumference (girth) is about 168 cm, cannon bone measurement about 19 cm. The profile is straight or slightly convex, the legs fine and often bowed; the mane and tail are sparse, and the skin is delicate.
