= Russian Trotter =

Russian breed of trotting horse

Russian Trotter Русский рысак
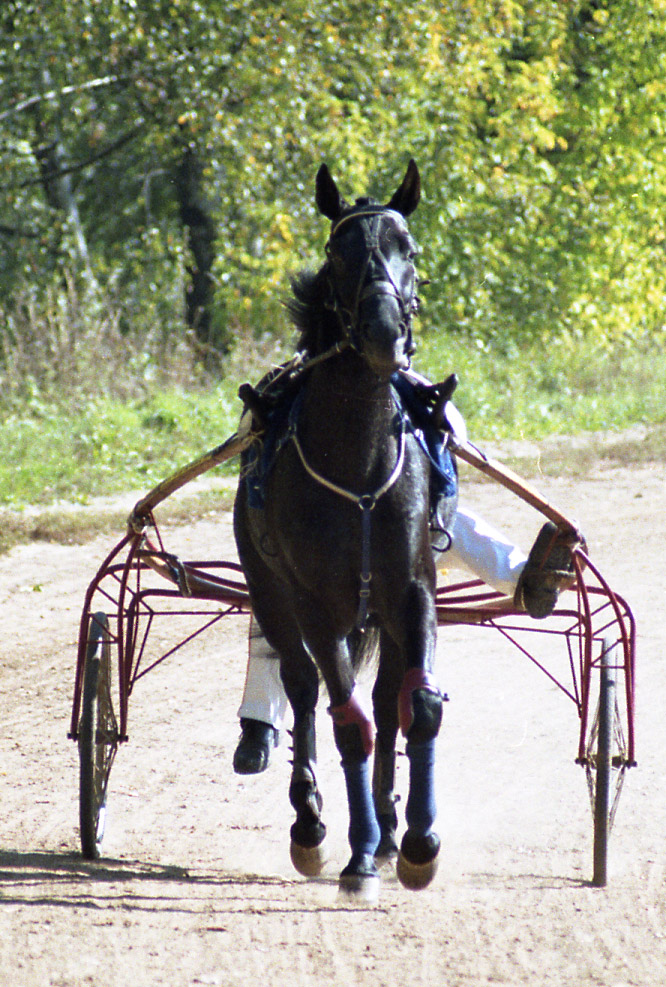
- Russian Trotter with racing sulky
- Other names: Russian: Русский Рысак; (Russkii Rysak); Russian: Ру́сская Рыси́стая; (Russkaya Rysistaya); Orlov-American Trotter
- Country of origin: Russian Federation

Traits
- Distinguishing features: Male height: 161 cm; Female height: 159 cm

The Russian Trotter is a breed of trotting horse from the Russian Federation. It originated from cross-breeding of native Orlov Trotter horses with imported American Standardbred stock from about 1890; by about 1950 the Russian Trotter breed was considered established, although some cross-breeding with American stallions continued. A stud-book was established in 1927; in 1989 it ran to 23 volumes.

The Russian Trotter is widely distributed, from the Baltic to Siberia. In 1989 there were approximately 290,000 in the USSR, of which some 27,000 were considered purebred.
