= Kazakh horse =

Horse breed developed by the Kazakh peoples of Asia

Kazakh Horse
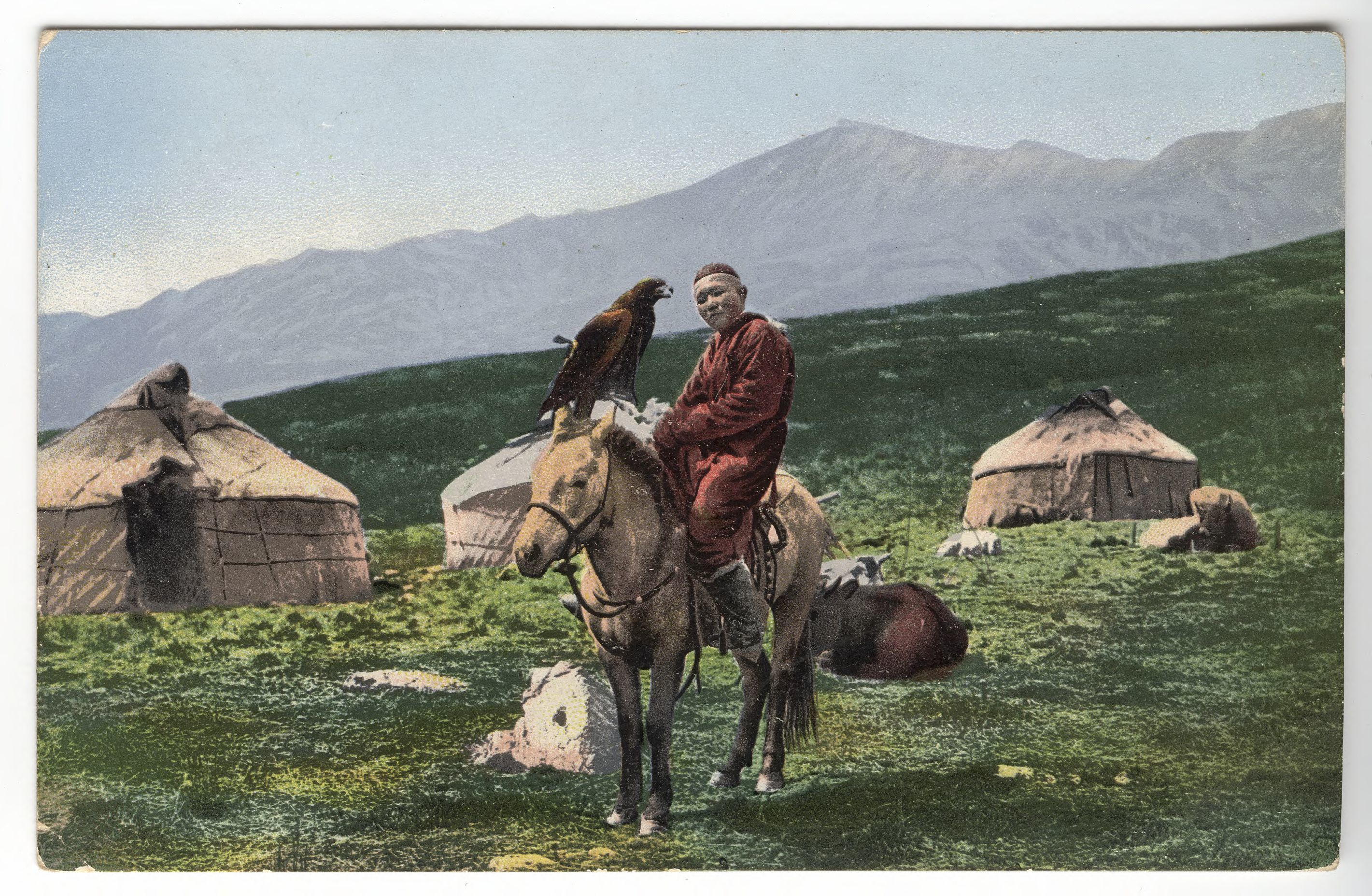
- Other names: Kazakh
- Country of origin: Kazakhstan

Traits
- Distinguishing features: Easy keeper, great endurance and stamina

The Kazakh Horse (Kazakh: Қазақ жылқысы) is a horse breed of the Kazakh people, who live mainly in Kazakhstan, but also in parts of China, Mongolia, Russia and Uzbekistan. It is used mainly as a riding horse, and is known for its hardiness and stamina.

== Characteristics ==
The Kazakh horse averages 144 centimetres (14.0 1/2 hands; 56 1/2 in) for stallions and mares average 142 centimetres (14.0 hands; 56 in). They weigh between 400 and 500 kilograms (880 and 1,100 lb). The breed is criticized for a short stride and a jolting trot. However, they are also very hardy and able to cover long distances.

The breed has two subtypes, the Dzhabe and Adaev .

=== Dzhabe ===
The Dzhabe (also written as Zhabe or Jabe) developed in the southern districts of Aktubinsk. In general, the Dzabe has a heavy head, thick, short neck, and deep chest. They have a straight back, strong legs and a well-muscled croup. They are usually bay, dark bay, chestnut or gray. The Zhabe type saw its formation in 1931, increasing in effort in the same decade. In the 1980s, specific breeding efforts have been made to improve the phenotype of the breed, especially in the Zhanaarka District, at the Senim breeding farm and Aktau, a former state farm. They shifted from selection groups of horses, as seen in the early days of the breeding type, and moved to selecting individual horses for selective breeding. For example, at the Senim breeding farm, where this resulted in the Zymyrana breeding. In 2015 this breeding line included mares and stallions with averages of a height of 143 to 146 cm, and a weight of 457 to 481 kg, with prominent wider chests and circumference. With offspring showing on average an even higher height and weight, compared to breeding line mares and stallions.

=== Adaev ===
The Adaev (also written as Adev) are more refined with lighter heads, longer necks, and well-defined withers. Due to the primitive conditions in which they live, this strain is more susceptible to developing narrow chests and light bone structure.

== History ==
Kazakh shepherd with his horse and tobets (dog breed)

Horses in the region of Kazakhstan date to the 5th century B.C. Early influences on what today is the Kazakh horse include the Akhal-Teke, Arabian, Karabair, and Mongolian horse. Beginning in the 20th century, the breed had additional infusions of blood from the Russian Don, Orlov Trotter and the Thoroughbred.

The Kazakh today resembles a more elegant version of the Mongolian horse. The breed is still bred by once-nomadic Kazakh tribesmen, although cross-breeding has somewhat diluted the traditional bloodlines.

== Uses ==
Today, the Kazakh horses are seen mostly in western Kazakhstan, where there are over 300,000. The main use of the Kazakh is for riding, although they are also bred for horsemeat.
