= Budyonny horse =

Breed of horse

Budyonny
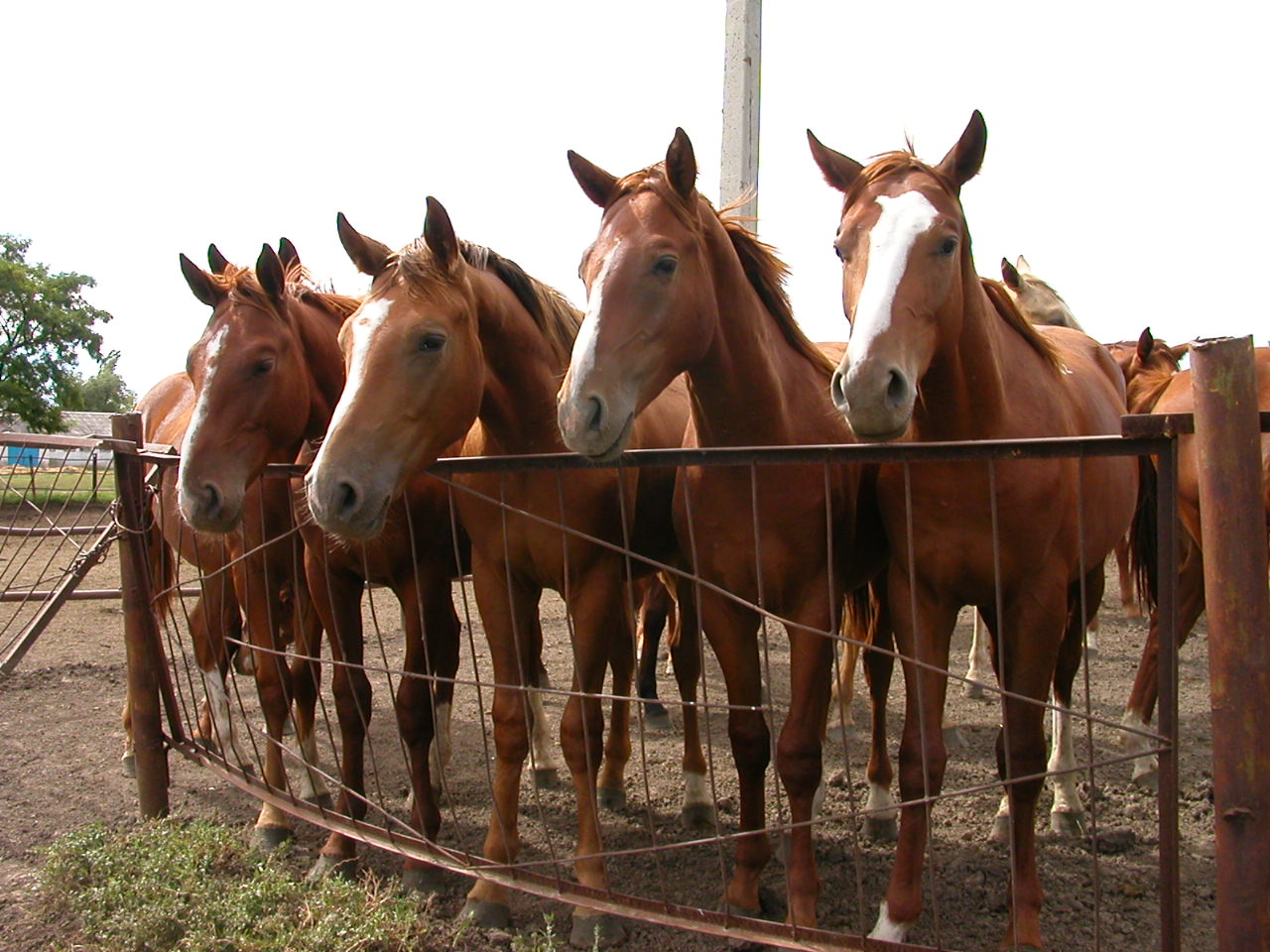
- Young Budyonny stallions in Russia
- Other names: Budenny; Budjonny; Budonny; Budennovsky
- Country of origin: Southern Russia

The Budyonny is a horse breed from Russia. It was bred as a military horse after the Russian Revolution of 1917; in the twenty-first century it is used as an all-purpose competition horse and for driving.

== Characteristics ==
Budyonny stallions stand on average 165 cm (16.1 h), mares 163 cm (16 h). The coat is generally chestnut with a golden sheen, although they may also be bay, gray or black. They have a well-proportioned head with a straight profile, a long neck, pronounced withers, sloping shoulders, a wide, deep chest, a long, straight back, and a slightly sloping croup. Their legs are long and strong with good joints and well-formed hooves. The modern horse has a strong build, good bone, and are quite similar to the Thoroughbred. Conformation problems include occasional offset cannon bones in the forelegs and overly straight hind legs.

In the beginning, “Massive,” “Eastern,” and “Middle” types of the breed were recognized.

- The Massive type was large and somewhat rough. They were sturdy, with a well-developed bone structure, and those with an oriental typiness were especially prized. Their robust constitution made them specially suitable for herd keeping. They were used mainly for carriage driving.
- The Oriental type was lighter and more elegant. Generally chestnut with a gold sheen or bay, they were more demanding in the feed and management conditions they required.
- The Medium type was fairly large and well-muscled, but also rangy and athletic. They were faster than the other two types, and looked more like the Thoroughbred type.

Later, demand for competition horses led to the creation of a single type with a larger proportion of Thoroughbred blood. This breed is of interest because it is the result of the complex state-sponsored cross-breeding programs that were implemented after the Russian Revolution and are still in place today. The Budyonny is bred today in Ukraine and in the Kazakh and Kirghiz republics in the southern part of the former USSR.

== Breed history ==
The Budyonny was named after Marshal Semyon Budyonny, a Bolshevik cavalry commander who became famous during the Russian Revolution. The breed was created by Budyonny, a well-known horse breeder himself, in the early 1920s in the Rostov region of Russia with the intent of producing cavalry horses to replace those lost during and after World War I. The resulting horses were used in Russian cavalry divisions during World War II and after.

Budyonnys were bred from a cross of local Don and Chernomor mares and Thoroughbred stallions. The Chernomor (also known as the Tchernomor or the Cherkassky) is a type of Cossack horse similar to the Don, although smaller. They are descendants of the horses raised by Zaporozhian Cossacks, and were first bred around Krasnodar, north of the Caucasus Mountains. During the first round of breeding for the Budyonny horse, blood from Kirghiz and Kazakh horses was also used, but the progeny was found to be not as hardy or conformationally sound, and later the Budyonny was used to improve these two breeds.

The first Budyonny horses were known as Anglo-Dons, and the best were inter-bred, with the foundation stock for the Budyonny selected from their offspring. The foundation stock consisted of 657 mares of Anglo-Don, Anglo-Chernomor, and Anglo-Don/Chernomor crosses. These mares were crossed with Anglo-Don and Thoroughbred stallions. The broodmares were given the best of care with feed and management. The young stock, when between two and four years old, were tested for performance on the racecourse and in cavalry equitation courses. In 1949 the breed was officially recognized.

In the 1950s an experiment was performed to gauge the ability of the Budyonny breed to adapt to harsh conditions without human help. A number of horses were turned loose on a large island in Manych Lake in the Rostov district. The horses have since survived and thrived, proving that they are capable of living in the wild for extended periods without human assistance.

== Uses ==
The Budyonny is used as an all-round competition horse, competing in dressage, steeplechasing, three-day eventing and endurance. It is also used as a light carriage horse.
