= Russian Don =

Breed of horse

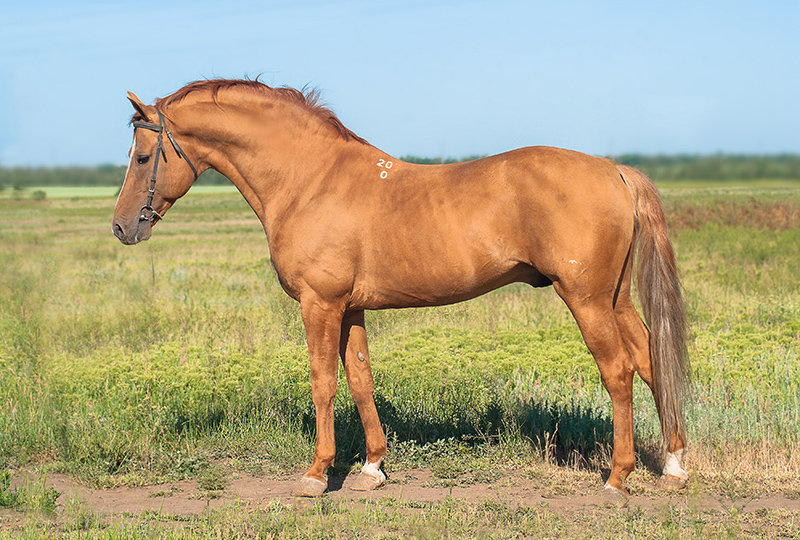

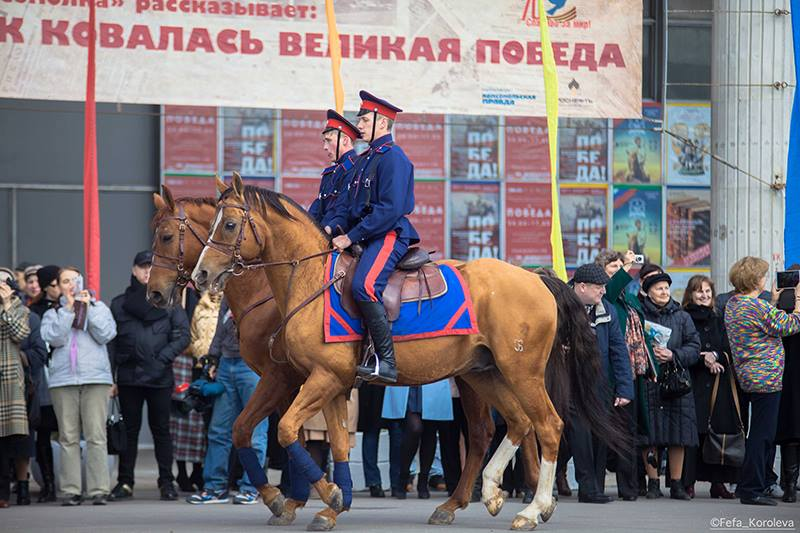
- Other names: Don horse
- Country of origin: Russia

The Russian Don is a breed of horse developed in and named after the steppes region of Russia where the Don River flows. Utilized originally as cavalry horses for the Cossacks, they are currently used for under-saddle work and driving.

== Characteristics ==
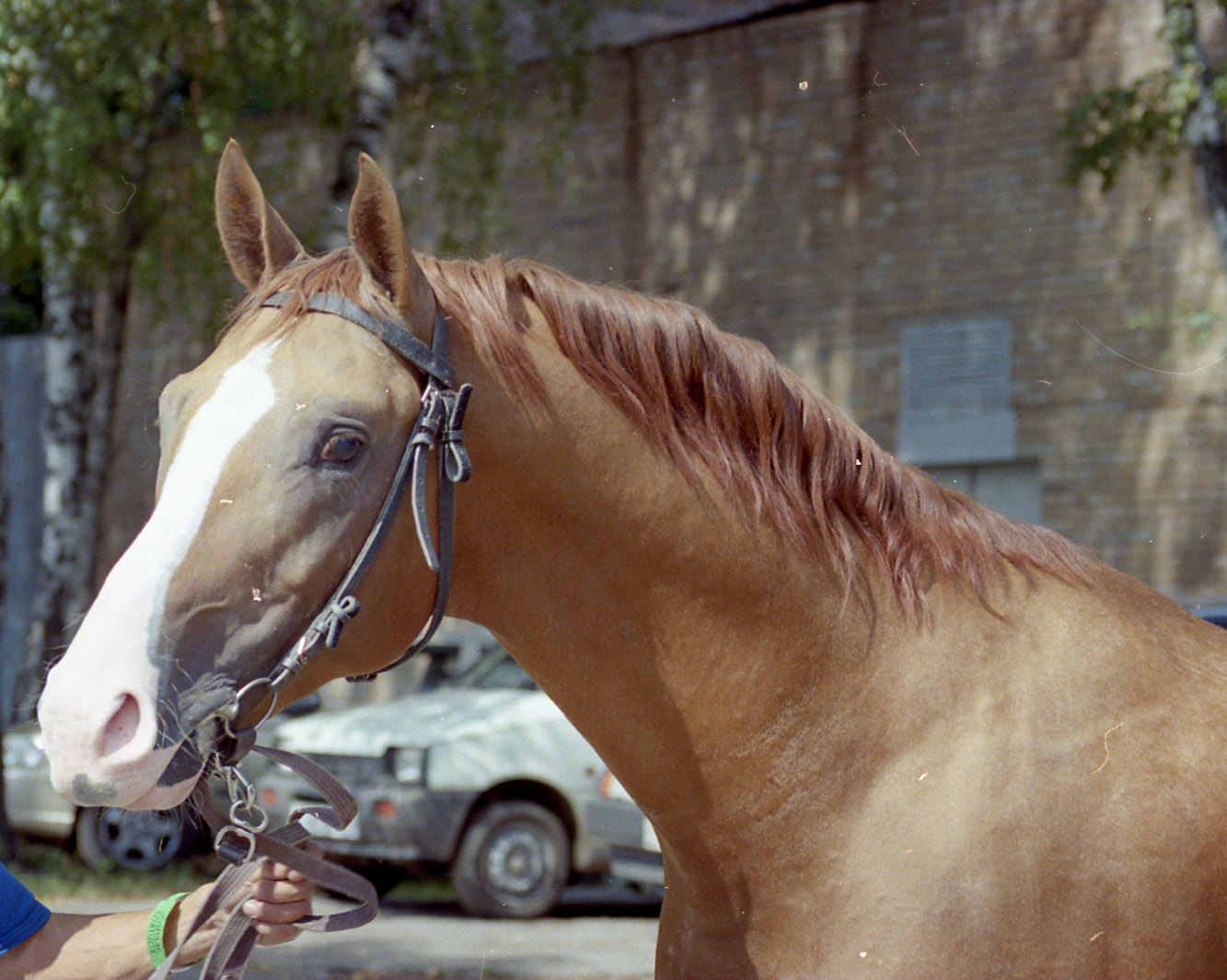
Head of a Don

The Don usually stands 15.1 to 15.3 hands (61 to 63 inches, 155 to 160 cm), and may be bay, black, gray or chestnut. They have a clean head with a straight or dished profile, well set onto a well-formed neck, high withers, and a wide, deep chest. Their shoulders can be straight, limiting the length of their stride, but are often well-formed. The back is long and straight, flowing into a croup that is long and sloping. The legs are long, well-muscled, and clean with broad joints, strong tendons, and tough hooves.

== Breed history ==
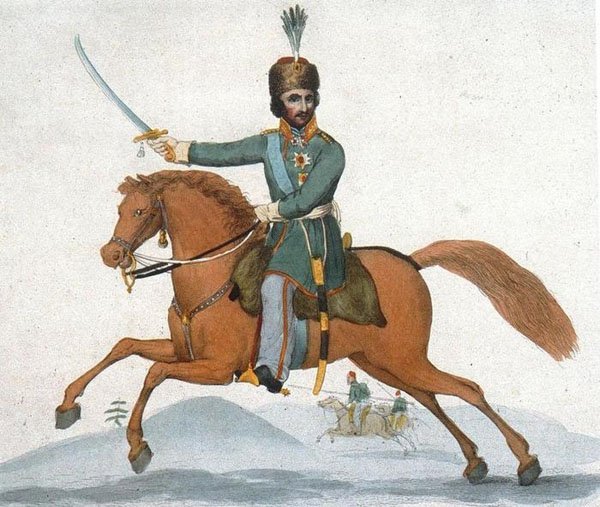
Count Platov on a Don horse

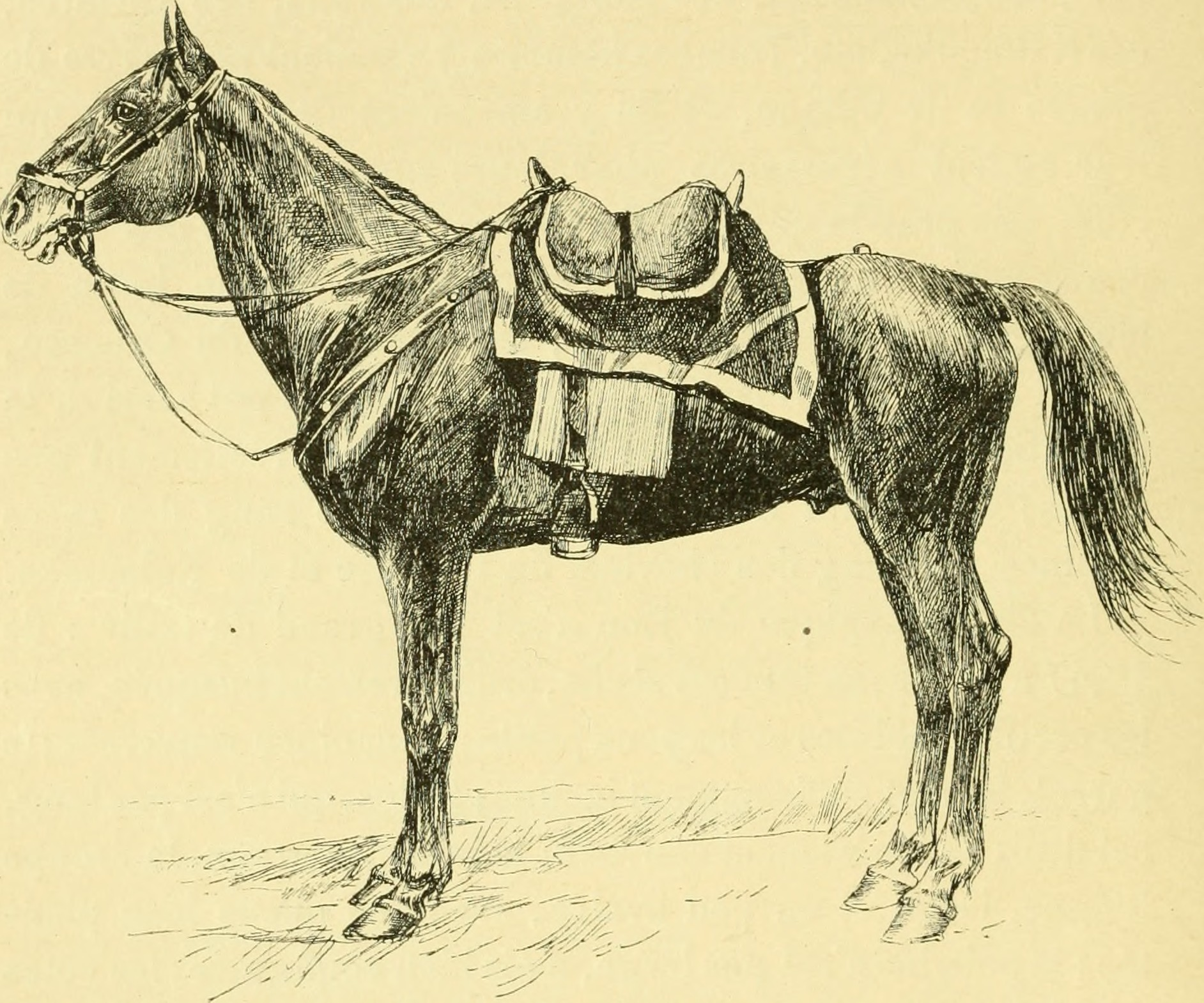
Russian Don (1890s)

The first type of Don horse, generally called the "Old Don," evolved from semi-feral Russian steppe horses and Oriental horse breeds such as the Karabakh horse, Turkmenian, and Arabian that were brought to Russia as a product of Cossack raids. The Old Don was a medium-sized, agile horse with immense endurance; a result of the survival-of-the-fittest selection methods that guided the development of many Russian breeds. This hardy horse was used as the foundation for the current Russian Don, and was also used to improve the Orlov, Orlov-Rostopchin, and Thoroughbred breeds. Cossack cavalry mounted on the Old Don horses were instrumental in the destruction of Napoleon's Russian campaign, and the horses were important in proving the supremacy of Cossack cavalry over their European counterparts.

During the early 19th century, the breed was improved into the newer type through the addition of Orlov Trotter, Arabian, Thoroughbred, and Karabakh blood. During the second half of the 19th century, the Don breed was in high demand as cavalry horses. Private breeders began to focus on the Dons, and bred for conformation, endurance, height, and the characteristic color of chestnut with a gold sheen. Dons were also gaining popularity outside of Russia, and many were exported. During the 1920s, after much of the Don stock had been wiped out in World War I and the Russian Revolution, the remaining horses were reassembled at several military studs, as well as within the Cossack population, and with concentrated breeding the stock was fairly quickly restored.

== Uses ==
The main use of the Russian Don breed in past times was as the mount of the Cossack cavalry. Known for their endurance and stamina, these horses could cover long distances in short amounts of time, with reserves of energy left for battle. Today, the Don is widely used as a saddle horse, and is also used in harness, often in the traditional Russian tachanka, where four horses are hitched side-by-side.

The Don played an important role in the development of many other USSR-developed breeds, including the Budyonny.

== See also ==
- Horses in Russia
- Chernomor (Russian horse)
- Amourski (Russian horse breed origin)
