= Turkoman horse =

Oriental horse breed from the steppes of Central Asia

The Turkoman horse, or Turkmene, is an Oriental horse breed from the steppes of Central Asia. It influenced many modern horse breeds, including the Thoroughbred horse. Modern descendants include the Akhal-Teke, the Iomud, the Goklan and Nokhorli. The Turkmen is only bred in north-east Iran, with only around 3000 left, leaving the population at risk.

== Characteristics ==
The Turkoman horse has a slender body, a straight profile, long neck, and sloping shoulders. They have long and muscular legs. The horses range from 15–16 hands. The Turkoman is noted for its endurance and good resistance to diseases. They are used for racing.

== Turkmen influence on European horse breeds ==
The Turkoman horse has influenced the English Thoroughbred, most probably via the Byerley Turk. Turkomans were brought to England by soldiers stationed in various parts of the East. The best known was a stallion named Merv, who was brought to England by Baker Pasha in the 19th century. A very high stud fee was charged for Merv's services, £85, which was considered excessive for any stallion at that time. Unfortunately, other Englishmen did not esteem Merv the way Baker Pacha did. Sidney quotes a correspondent who had seen Merv and stated: "He looked to me about 16 hands high, fine shoulders, good head and neck, fine skin, good wearing legs, bad feet and leggy. I thought him unsuited to breed hunters ... he looked to me about an 11 stone horse, and did not like going through dirt." In this context, "11 stone" referenced rider weight, thus such a horse would be one expected to be able to carry about 150 pounds (68 kg). Merv covered no mares in England, and in 1877, he was sold to the Earl of Claremont's stud in Ireland.

Turkoman horses, aside from being occasional gifts of state, were often brought into Western Europe by various individuals, mostly connected with the military in some way. Some of these horses have profoundly impacted various European warmblood breeds.

Gervase Markham, Master of Horse to James I of England, preferred the English Thoroughbred first among all breeds of horses; the Neapolitan second, and the steppe-bred Turk third. He had seen Turks racing on English race courses circa 1566–1625. He also noted that the Turks he had seen were: "Naturally in they desire to amble, and, which is most strange, their trot is full of pride and gracefulness."
