= Orlov Trotter =

Russian breed of horse

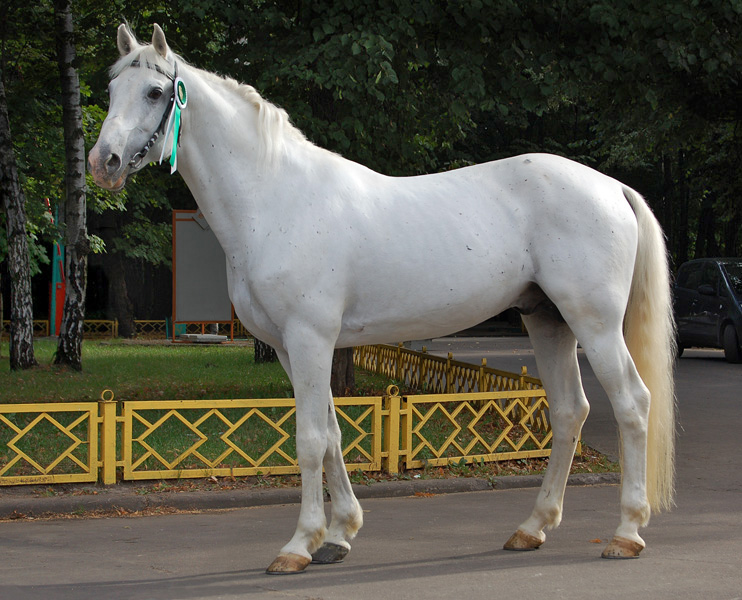
- An Orlov Trotter
- Other names: Orloff Trotter
- Country of origin: Russian Empire, Voronezh Governorate

Traits
- Distinguishing features: Predominantly gray, harness-racing type

The Orlov Trotter (also known as Orlov; Russian: орловский рысак) is a horse breed with a hereditary fast trot, noted for its outstanding speed and stamina. It is the most famous Russian horse. The breed was developed in Russia in the late 18th century by Count Alexei Orlov at his Khrenovskoy stud farm near the town of Bobrov (Voronezh Guberniya). The Orlovs emerged as the result of crossing various European mares (primarily of English, Dutch, Mecklenburg, and Danish breeding) with Arabian stallions.

During the 19th century, Orlov Trotters were used mainly for riding and harness racing by the Russian nobility and the House of Romanov. They were valued for their beauty and elegance combined with the ability to work hard. They were also used for the improvement of other Russian horses. When harness racing became widespread at the end of the century, the Orlovs faced intense competition from American-developed Standardbreds, who are generally recognized as less refined but faster than Orlov Trotters.

In the 20th century, Standardbred stallions were crossed with Orlov Trotter mares; and a new breed, the Russian Trotter, appeared. The possibility of the extinction of the Orlov Trotter was a concern in the 20th century due to too much crossbreeding, and the Soviet disregard of horse-raising. However, the breed survived, and today, 15 stud farms in Russia and Ukraine raise purebred Orlov Trotters.

== History ==
=== Development of the breed ===
The land that became Orlov's Khrenovsky stud farm was gifted by Empress Catherine II of Russia as a reward for his participation in the coup d'etat which brought her to the throne. The buildings were constructed by Giovanni Giliardi. The original estate was very large; the modern Khrenovsky stud area is smaller than it was prior to the Bolshevik Revolution.

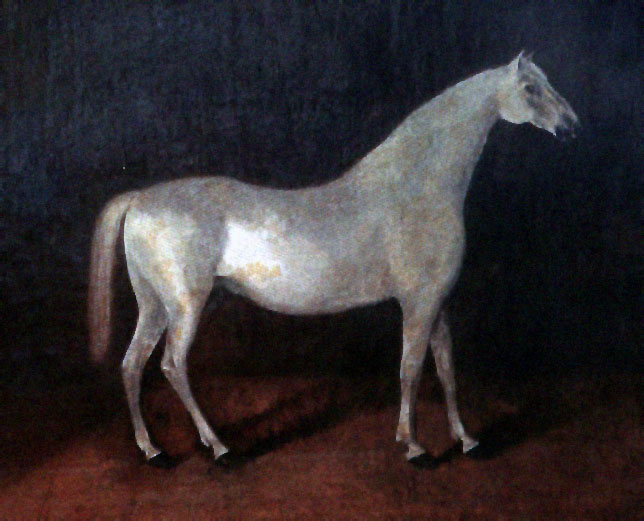
Smetanka

The ancestor of all Orlov Trotters was the purebred grey Arabian stallion Smetanka (Russian: Сметанка). Orlov bought him in the Ottoman Empire for the enormous sum of 60,000 rubles. Although he died the next year, he lived to sire five offspring. Among others he was crossed with Isabelline, a Frederiksborger mare, who foaled a stallion named Polkan (1778–1793).

Polkan was crossed with a Dutch mare which, in 1784, produced the grey stallion Bars I (1784–1808), considered the first "Orlov Trotter". He was 16 hands (64 inches, 163 cm) high at the withers, which made him taller than most contemporary trotters; possessed a fast trotting gait; and featured the beauty and noble bearing which would later distinguish the newly created breed.

For 17 years, Bars I was crossed with a variety of imported broodmares - and sired 11 stallions that carried his distinguishing characteristics. The emergence of the breed was the result of a thorough and elaborate selection process, called konnozavodstvo. About 3,000 horses kept at the stud were involved. Unlike many other Russian nobles, who were not fond of raising horses, Orlov was a professional horse breeder who was also credited for creating some 70 different animal breeds, including the Russian Wolfhound.

Orlov was very protective of his foundation stock, and would sell only geldings (castrated stallions). Even when Tsar Alexander I of Russia asked Orlov to sell him several stallions, Orlov only agreed to sell geldings. This rule was maintained for 20 years after Orlov's death in 1808. Later, when the Khrenovsky stud farm belonged to the Russian Crown and the House of Romanov, only then were Orlov Trotters openly sold to private stud owners.

=== 19th century ===
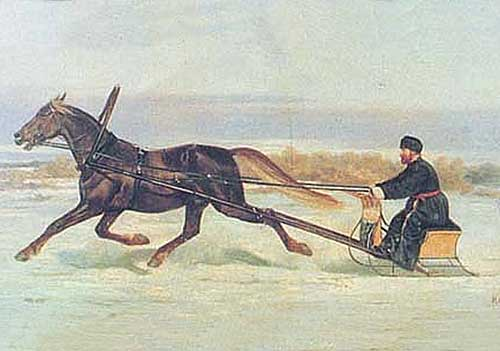
Orlov Trotter in racing sleigh

In 1809, the Khrenovsky stud farm was inherited by Orlov's daughter, Anna. Until 1831, Orlov's disciple, the former serf Vasily Shishkin, continued to develop the breed. However, in 1831, he left the Khrenovsky stud farm, and founded his own. Orlov's daughter lacked her father's competence in horse breeding, and the Khrenovsky stud farm went downhill. Trotters were intensively crossed with various European breeds in order to increase their dimensions, and their quality fell. In 1845, the stud farm passed into the hands of the Russian Crown; but for some time, this only made matters worse. It was able to regain its fame only some decades later. In 1881, the Khrenovsky stud farm stopped raising all breeds, except for Orlov Trotters. The best Orlov Trotters were now raised in private stud farms, such as the Shishkin's.

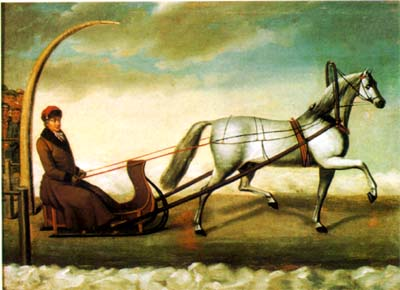
Count Alexey Orlov driving Bars the First, by N. Sverhckov

In 1834, a Trotting Society was established in Moscow, and regular races began. Orlov Trotters had already proved to be the best racing horses in Russia, and soon, they proved to be the best in Europe. In 1867, the Orlov Trotter horse Beduin made headlines when, at World's Fair in Paris, he covered 3,500 feet in 1 minute 32 seconds – 4 seconds ahead the fastest Standardbred mare at that time, Flora Temple. Since then, many Orlovs have been sold abroad, where they greatly contributed to the creation of local trotting breeds. Meanwhile, in the United States, the Standardbred was gradually improved, until Standardbreds were able to outrace Orlov Trotters. In 1877, harness racing totalisator emerged in Russia and this led to crucial changes in breeding Orlovs. Many stud farmers turned to raising racing horses, who were not as large and hard-working, or as beautiful and elegant, as traditional Orlov Trotters.

Since Standardbreds were, in general, faster than Orlov Trotters, these breeds were intensively crossed in Russia. The resulting breed was called Russian Trotter, and these horses lacked many distinctive features of the classic Orlov Trotter. They were smaller and lighter, and were not capable of doing as much work as Orlov Trotters were. In order to prevent purebred Orlov Trotters from disappearing through crossbreeding with Standardbreds, the Russian government introduced separate races for Orlov Trotters and Standardbreds.

Eventually, Russian stud farmers managed to improve the racing performance of Orlov Trotters. The stallion Krepysh (b. 1904) won 55 races, and covered 1 mile for 2 minutes 8.5 seconds. He was the fastest trotter in pre-revolutionary Russia, but Krepysh and most of his issue died during the Russian Civil War (1917 — 1923).

=== 20th century ===
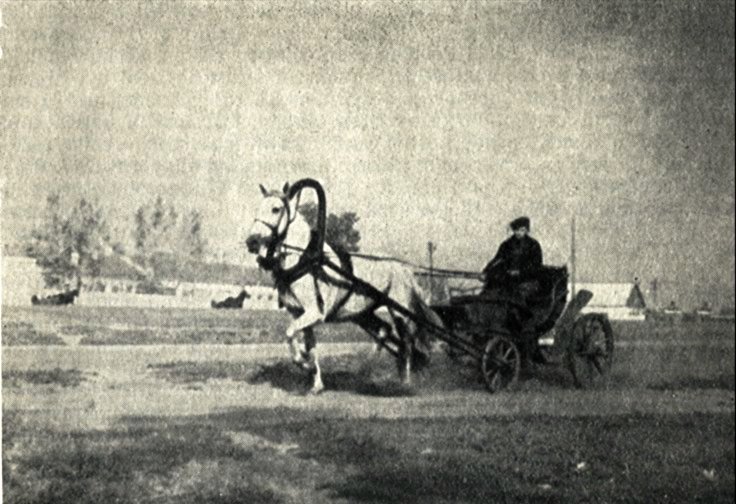
An Orlov Trotter as used in a Soviet kolkhoz.

World War I (1914 — 1918) and the Russian Civil War (1917 — 1923) caused a major disaster for horse breeding in Russia. Many horses died in battle, yet more were eaten for food, and there was a general collapse of the economy, making horse breeding a luxury few could afford. However, after 1920, the raising of Orlov Trotters resumed and crossbreeding was forbidden. At that time, Orlov Trotters were used primarily for farming and transport due to their physical strength and outstanding working abilities. By the 1930s, race breeding had also been reestablished and pre-revolutionary racing records were being broken. Arguably, the Orlovs reached their second heyday in the 1930s.

During World War II, also known as the Soviet-German war, the number of Orlov Trotters again decreased. After the war, the state acutely needed horses in order to restore agricultural production. Due to their working ability and high productivity, Orlovs were again widely used to improve local horses. However, by 1953, the Soviet authorities decided that, in part due to increased use of the tractor, horse-raising was not important for the economy. This resulted in reduction of the number of stud farms, and less governmental support of those that remained.

=== Today ===
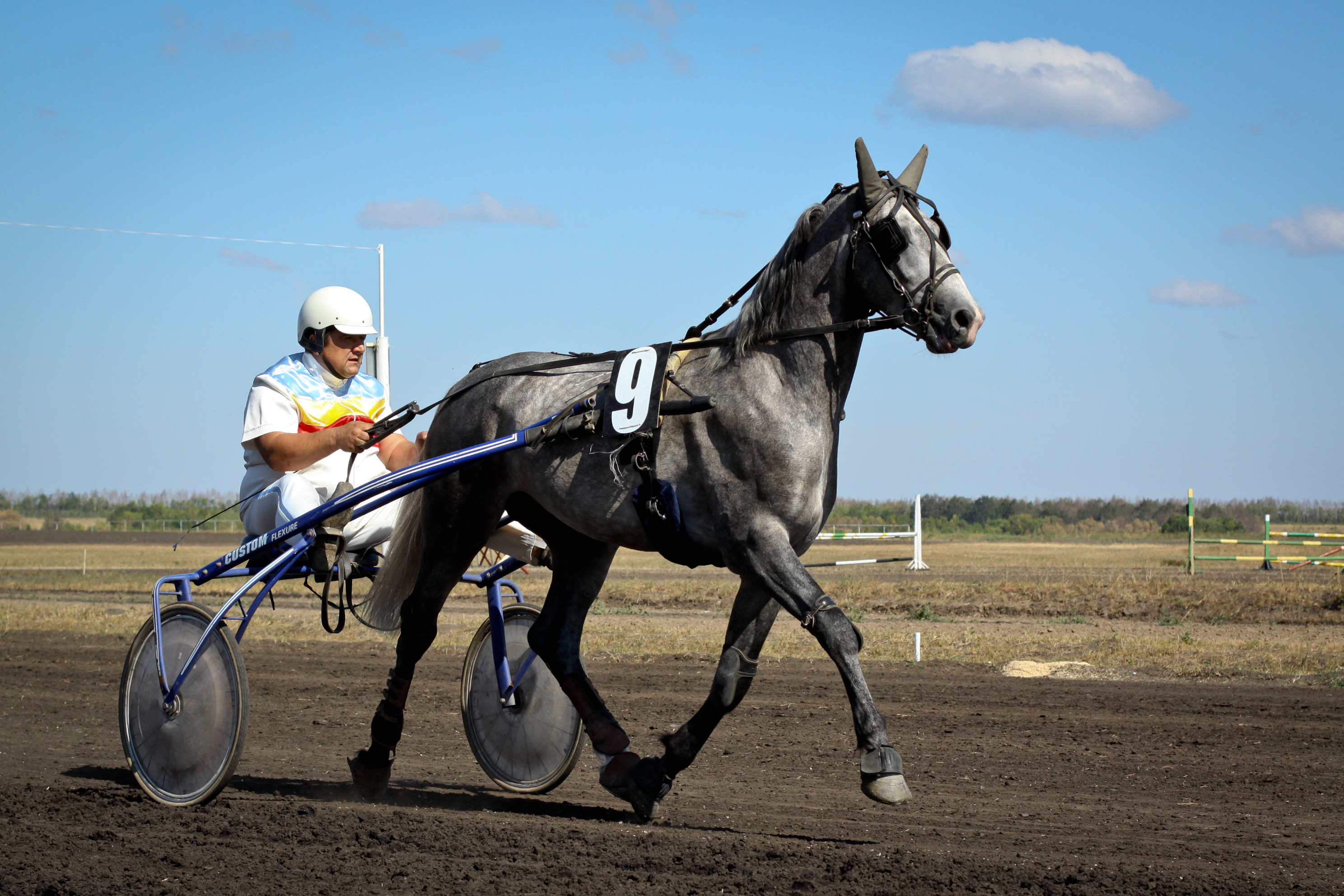
Present-day Orlov Trotter

After the dissolution of the Soviet Union on 25 December 1991, the future of the breed seemed unclear, as rich Russians interested in harness racing preferred the faster Russian Trotter and American Standardbred horse breeds. Therefore, in 1997, the International Committee for the Protection of the Orlov Trotter was established.

Purebred Orlov Trotters are now raised on 12 stud farms in Russia, and 3 in Ukraine. The studs in Russia have a total of about 800 mares, which raises some concern; it is a general rule that a horse breed with fewer than 1000 female individuals is in danger.

== Characteristics ==
The Orlov Trotters are generally taller and more robust than Standardbreds.

Due to the breed's Arabian origins, many Orlov Trotters are grey, at maturity, though all are born a darker colour at birth. Grey horses are born dark, and slowly lighten as they age, until their hair coat is completely white. At maturity, the colors of Orlovs are: grey, black, bay or chestnut.
