= Liberty Park =

Public park in Manhattan, New York

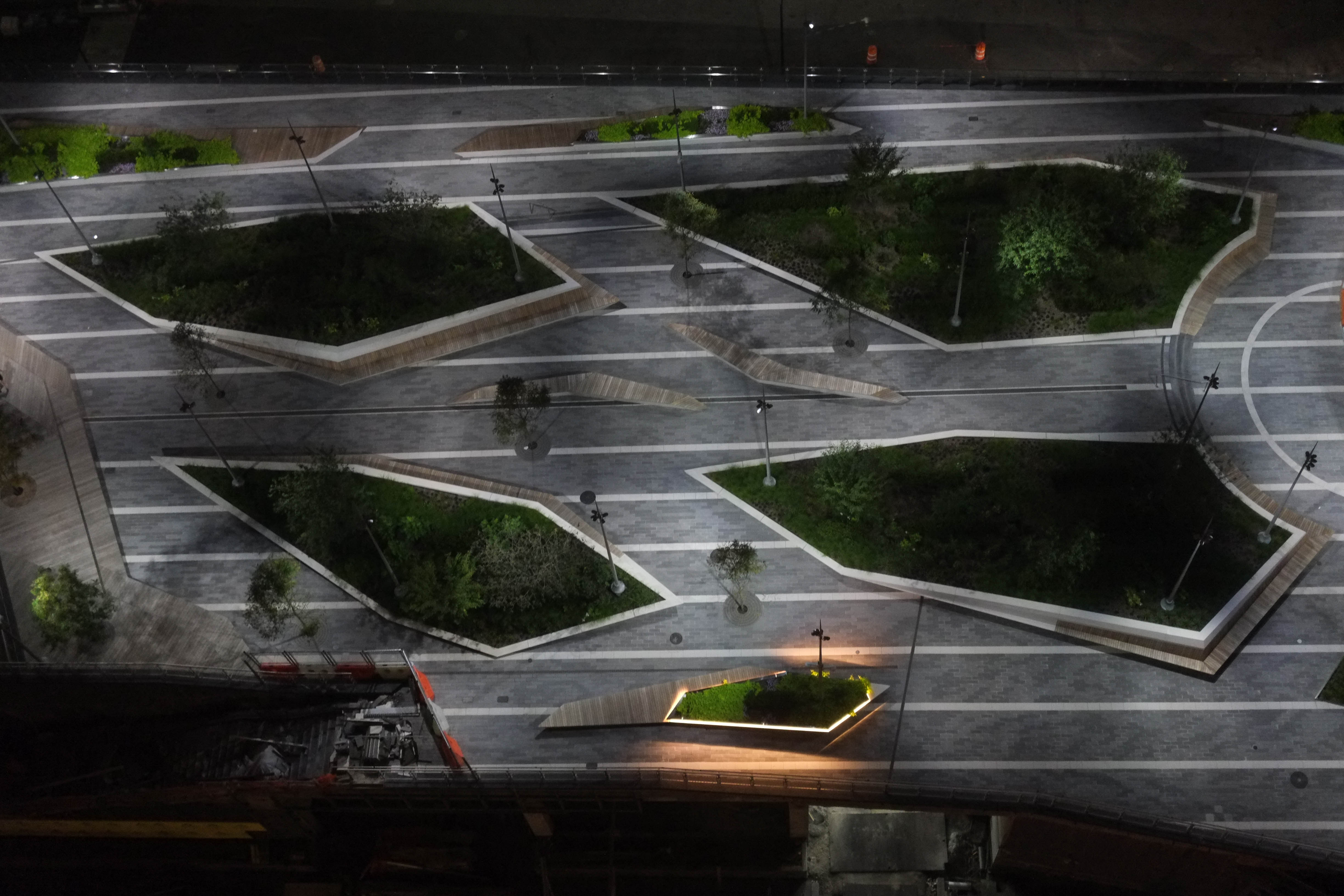
- Liberty Park at night while it was under construction in 2016
- Interactive map of Liberty Park
- Location: Lower Manhattan
- Nearest city: New York City
- Coordinates: 40.7104172°N 74.0139256°W
- Area: 1 acre (0.40 ha)
- Created: June 29, 2016
- Operator: Department of Parks and Recreation
- Open: June 29, 2016
- Status: Open
- Website: officialworldtradecenter.com/LibertyPark

Liberty Park is a one-acre (0.40 ha) elevated public park at the World Trade Center in Manhattan, New York City, overlooking the National September 11 Memorial & Museum in Lower Manhattan. The park, which opened on June 29, 2016, is located above the World Trade Center's Vehicular Security Center. The St. Nicholas National Shrine is located within the park, as well as Fritz Koenig's The Sphere, the iconic sculpture salvaged from the World Trade Center site. Another statue, America's Response Monument, is also located in the park.

== History ==
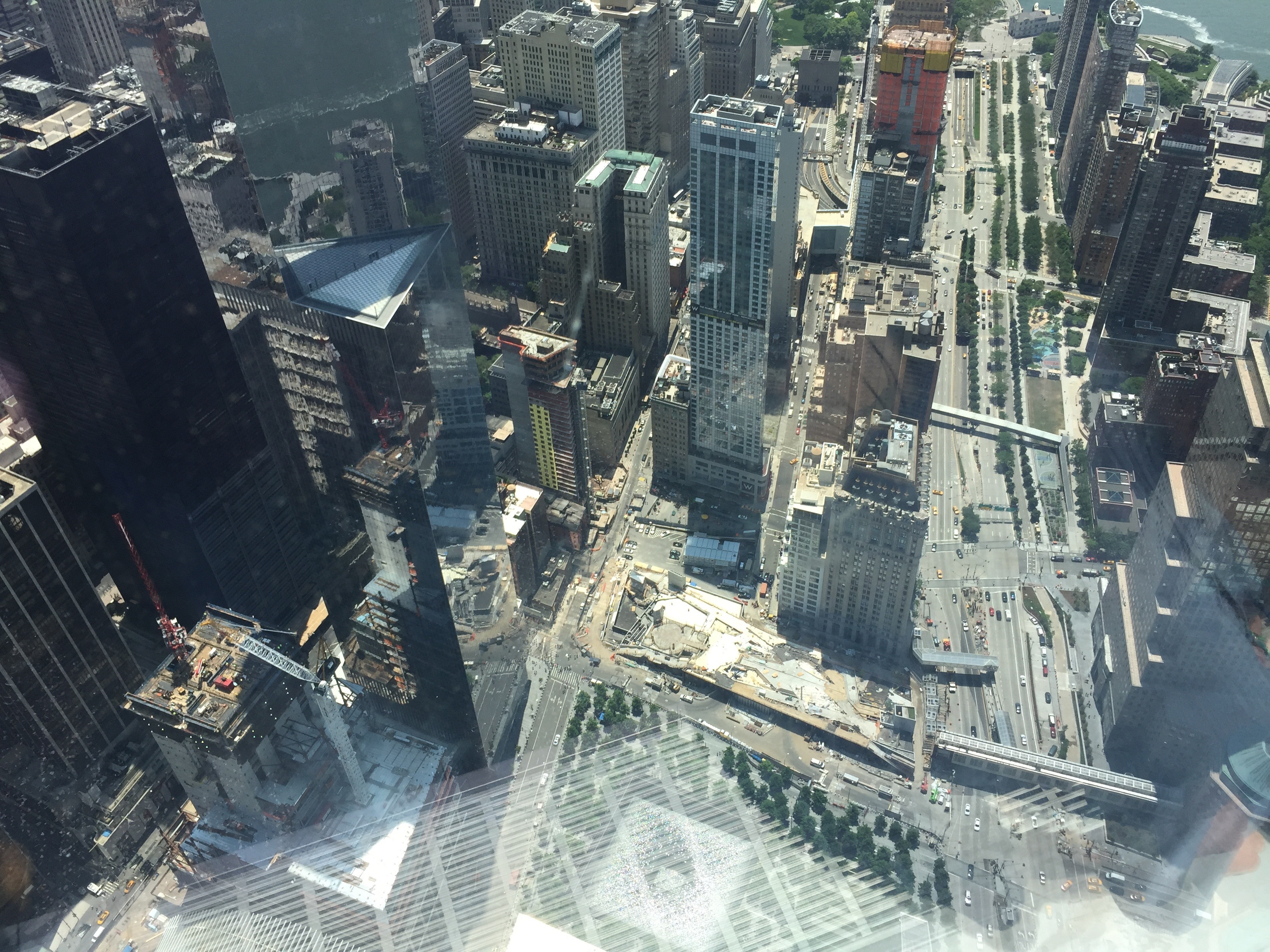
Liberty Park seen from One World Observatory in One World Trade Center during construction

Construction began in 2013 when the Vehicular Security Center was completed. Liberty Park is located on top of the Vehicular Security Center, the latter of which protects the site against unauthorized vehicles. The parking facility is linked to the concourse area, which feeds the entire 16-acre World Trade Center site. About $50 million was allocated to the park's construction by the Port Authority of New York and New Jersey in December 2013. The park opened on June 29, 2016. On August 16, 2017, the Port Authority installed The Sphere within the park, overlooking its original location.

== Description ==
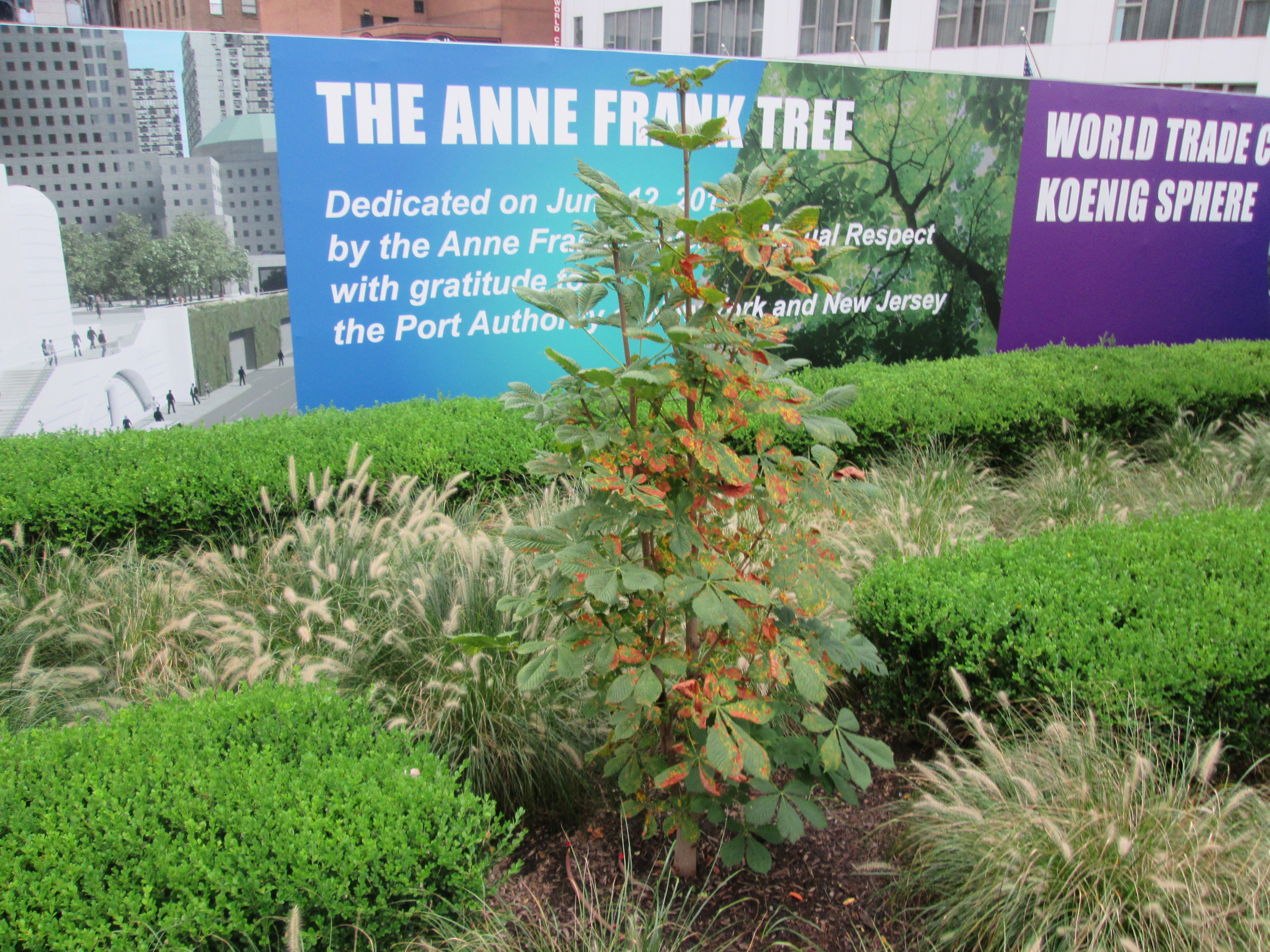
The sapling from the Anne Frank tree

The park has a capacity of 750 people and is the roof of the Vehicular Security Center. A "living wall", measuring 336 feet (102 m) long and 20 feet (6.1 m) tall, is located on the park's northern facade adjoining Liberty Street. It contains 826 panels, upon which are attached "periwinkle, Japanese spurge, winter creeper, sedge and Baltic ivy", A walkway from the pedestrian bridge curves along the park. Egresses include three stairways, the pedestrian bridge, and a straight ramp down to Greenwich Street. One of these stairs, a wide staircase is located on the east side of the park, between Greenwich Street to the east and the back of the church to the west. There are wood benches and a small amphitheater-like elevated space at the western end of the park, facing West Street. Finally, there is a "continuous overlook" along much of Liberty Street in addition to "a gently curving balcony" at the church's foot. A sapling from the Anne Frank tree is located alongside the ramp at the southeastern corner of Liberty Park.

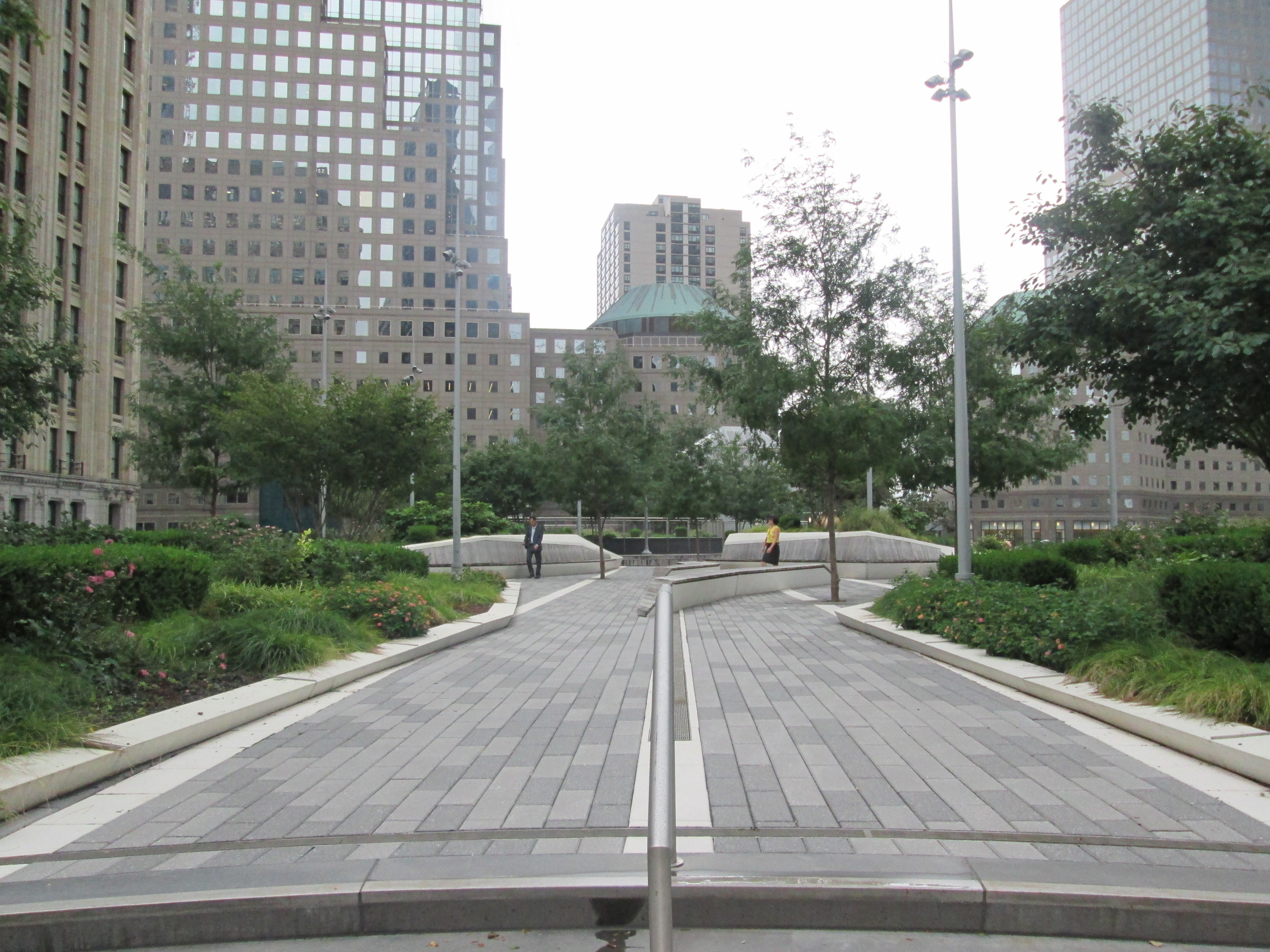
View of the park from in front of the St. Nicholas Greek Orthodox Church

5 World Trade Center is being built in the empty lot adjacent to the park. It is the former site of the Deutsche Bank Building.

The park overlooks the National September 11 Memorial & Museum and has a connection to the Liberty Street Bridge. The St. Nicholas Church, destroyed in the September 11 attacks, is being rebuilt in the park, with a new design by Santiago Calatrava, who also designed the Transportation Hub. The park, located 25 feet (7.6 m) above Liberty Street, is just a little more than one acre (4,000 m^{2}) in area.

=== Location of The Sphere ===
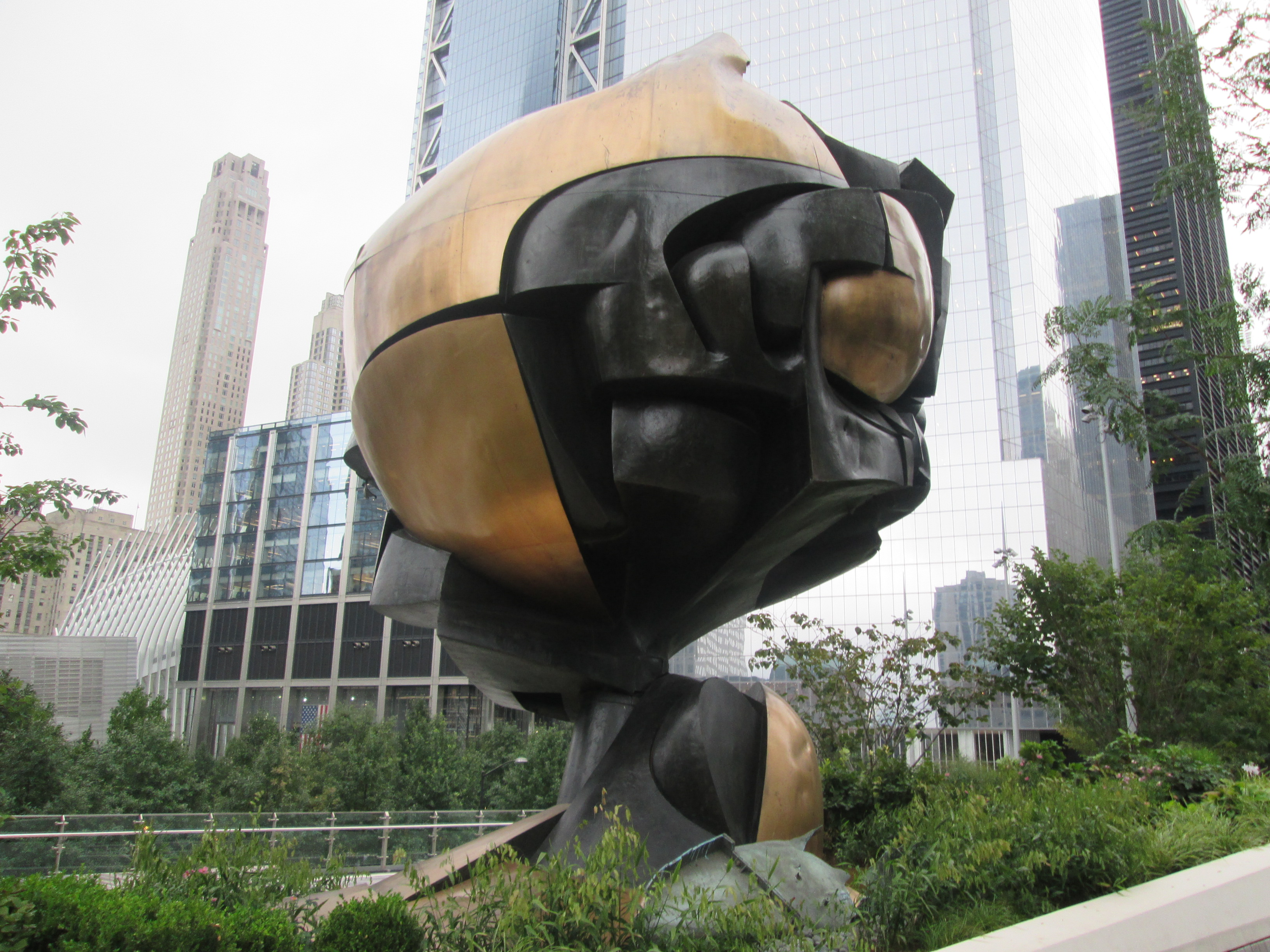
The Sphere, September 2018

The Sphere, a large cast bronze sculpture by German artist Fritz Koenig, had stood in Austin J. Tobin Plaza between the World Trade Center towers in Manhattan. Recovered from the rubble after the September 11 attacks in 2001, whole but visibly damaged, The Sphere was re-erected in Battery Park, near the Hope Garden. When construction began to restore Battery Park's Lawn, the Port Authority of New York and New Jersey (PANYNJ), which owns The Sphere, considered placing the sculpture in Liberty Park, which will be located between the 90 West Street building and the World Trade Center Memorial site. Construction on Liberty Park did not start until 2013, so a location was needed to place The Sphere until Liberty Park was completed. As of February 2011, PANYNJ had not made an official final decision on where to place the sculpture once Battery Park construction commences, forcing the sculpture to move. Until Liberty Park opened, The Sphere was to go into storage.

When Liberty Park opened in June 2016, the question had not been resolved. On July 22, 2016, the Port Authority voted to move the sculpture to Liberty Park, and in August 2017, PANYNJ relocated the sculpture to Liberty Park. On September 6, 2017, the Sphere was unveiled in its permanent home in Liberty Park, overlooking the World Trade Center site.

=== America's Response Monument sculpture ===
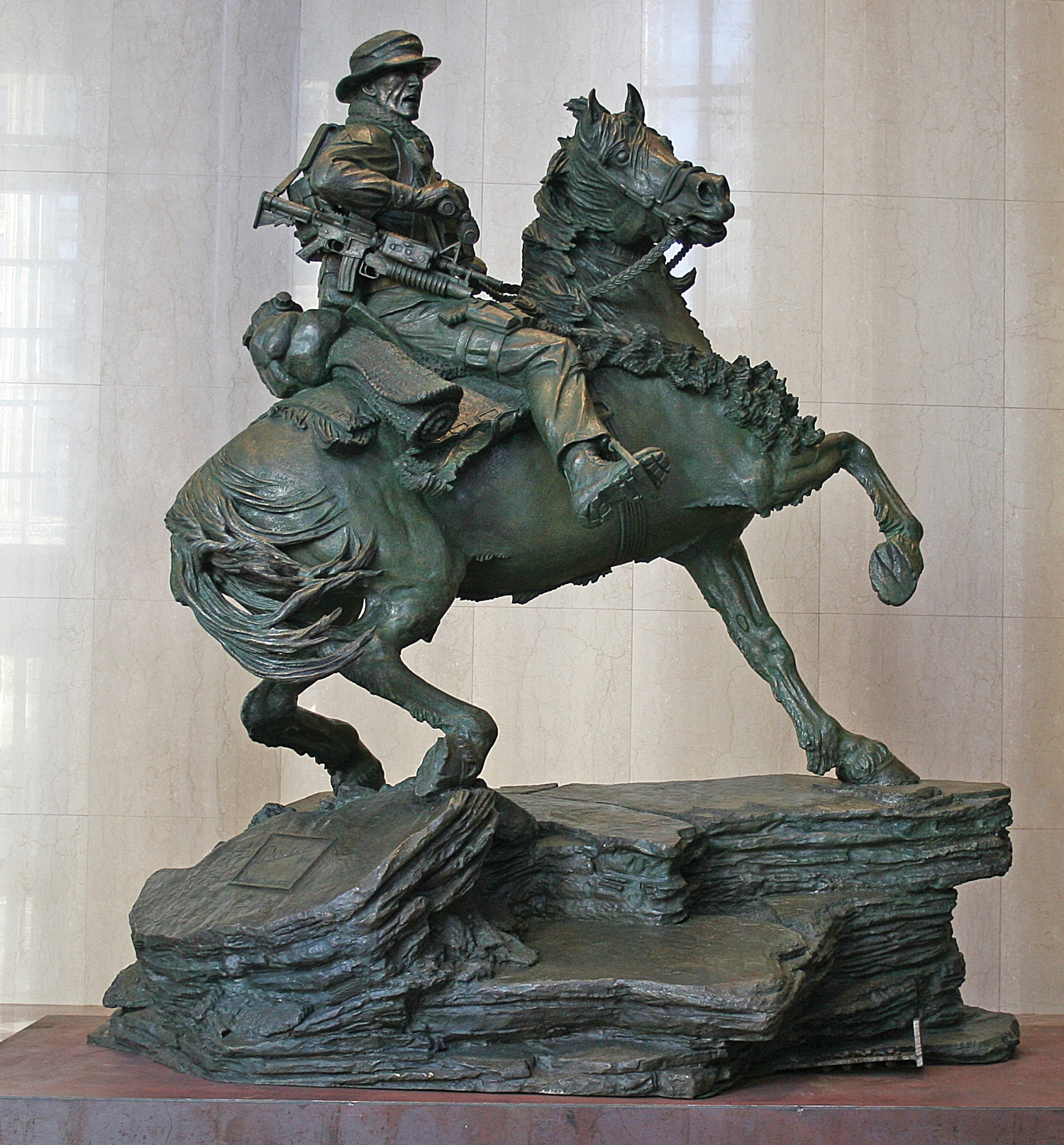
America's Response Monument

The America's Response Monument, a life-and-a-half scale bronze statue commemorating the actions of U.S. Special Operations Forces in the first few weeks of the War in Afghanistan, was unveiled to the public during the Veteran's Day Parade in New York City on November 11, 2011. The statue was dedicated in a ceremony led by Vice President Joe Biden and Lieutenant-General John Mulholland, commander of U.S. Army Special Operations Command and formerly commander of Task Force Dagger during the initial days of the War in Afghanistan. Soldiers representing the United States Army Special Operations Command attended the dedication ceremony.

The inscription at base of the sculpture bears its name, America's Response Monument, and the Latin subtitle De Oppresso Liber. The subtitle, traditionally translated as "to free the oppressed", is the motto of the Green Berets, who inspired the monument. A piece of steel from the original World Trade Center is embedded in the base. It is the first public monument to honor the United States Army Special Forces.

The $750,000 cost of statue was donated by hundreds of private citizens, including some survivors of the September 11 attacks. The statue was temporarily located in the West Street Lobby inside One World Financial Center in New York City opposite Ground Zero. On September 13, 2016, the statue was rededicated once again on an elevated space on the south side of Ground Zero within Liberty Park.

=== St. Nicholas Greek Orthodox Church ===
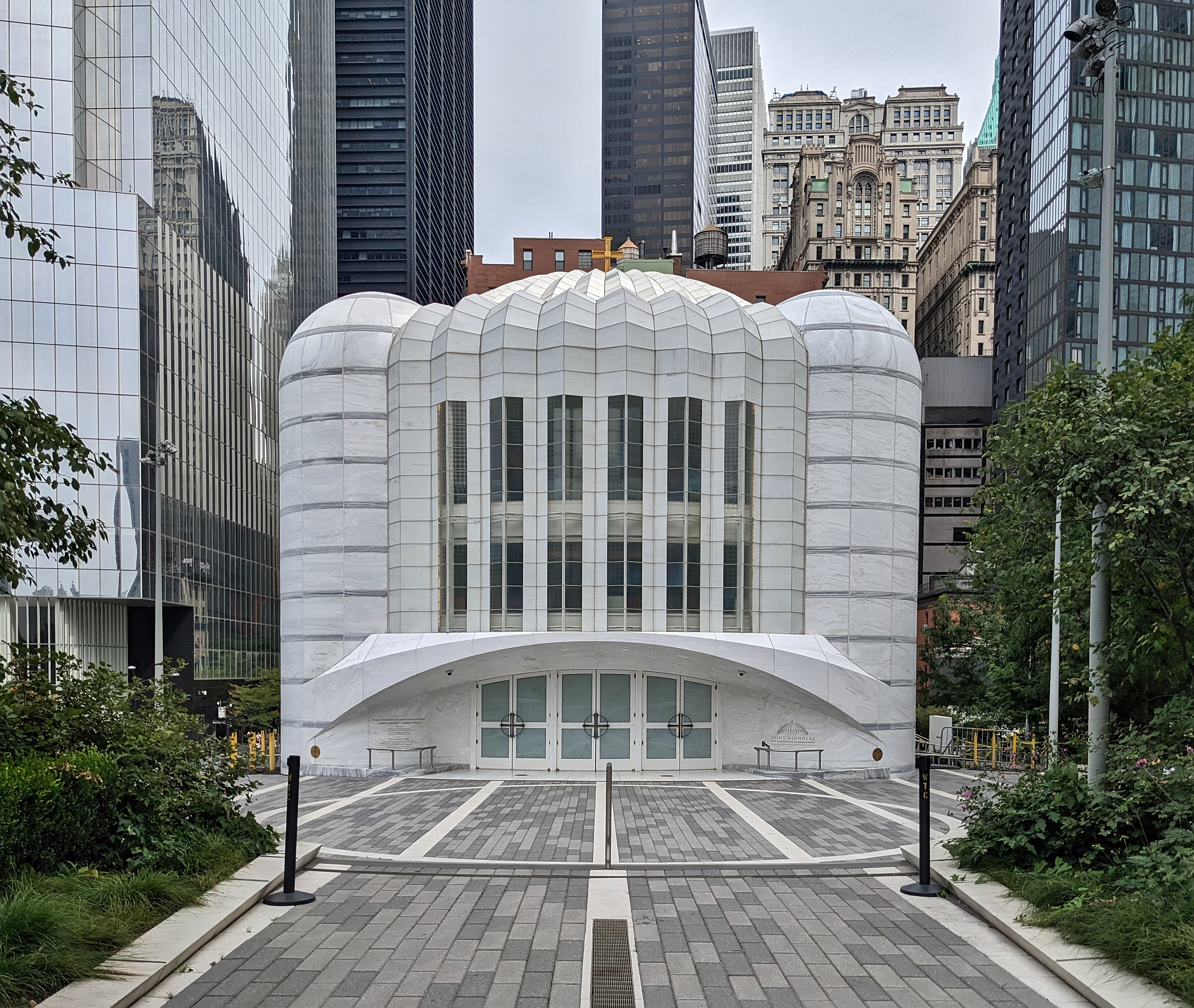
The St. Nicholas Greek Orthodox Church seen in August 2023

On July 23, 2008, the Port Authority of New York and New Jersey reached a deal with the leaders of the St. Nicholas Greek Orthodox Church for the Port Authority to acquire the 1,200-square-foot (110 m^{2}) lot that the church had occupied, for $20 million, $10 million of which is coming from the Port Authority and the other $10 million of which is coming from JPMorgan Chase.

In addition, the Port Authority was willing to pay up to $40 million to construct a bomb-proof platform underneath. In March 2009, the Port Authority stated it quit talking with the church and canceled building St. Nicholas altogether. The Port Authority claimed that the church was asking for too much, and that they might delay the whole World Trade Center project. The Archdioceses says that they just wanted the church back, and a third of the building would be a memorial for 9/11, and a place where people of all faiths could pray and remember those who died in the attacks.

Architect Santiago Calatrava was awarded the task of designing the new St. Nicholas. His plans drew inspiration from the great Byzantine churches of Hagia Sophia and the Church of the Holy Savior in Chora, both in Istanbul. The church will be constructed in Liberty Park; the site for the new church is east of the original site at 155 Cedar Street. As of 2013, construction of the new church was scheduled to begin in early 2014, and to end in late 2017. The new church was created from steel and concrete but the exterior is clad in stone. Construction of the new church began in early 2014, and after numerous delays, was completed in 2022.

=== Port Authority Employee Memorial ===
On September 8, 2026, a Port Authority Employee Memorial for the 1993 bombing and 9/11 attacks was installed at Liberty Park. The memorial contains 2 small replicas of the Twin Towers with the American flag on them and a black marble name of all the agency employees killed on 9/11. The memorial also includes a replica of the red marble ring and inscriptions from the 1993 World Trade Center Bombing Memorial, destroyed on 9/11.
