= Horse soldiers =

Horse soldiers may refer to:

- Horses in warfare
- Cavalry, soldiers who fight mounted on horseback
- Horse Soldiers, a 2009 non-fiction book by Doug Stanton
- The Horse Soldiers, a 1959 American film
- America's Response Monument (unofficially known as the Horse Soldier Statue) in New York City, New York, United States
