= Anne Frank Human Rights Memorial =

Park in Boise, Idaho, USA

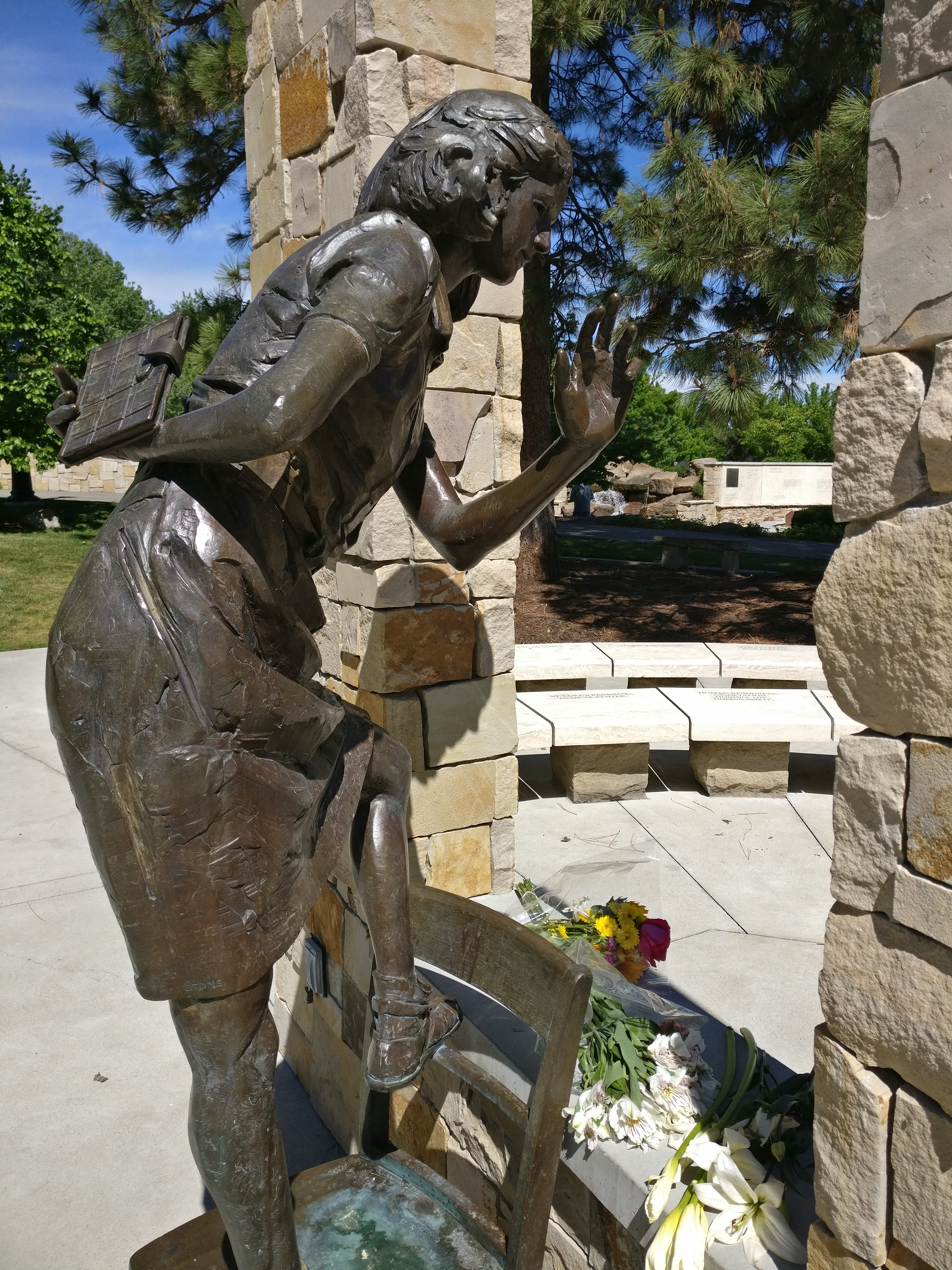
- Anne Frank is depicted looking out of her family's hiding place, famous diary in hand, having drawn an invisible curtain. The flowers were left in homage after the vandalism of May 2017.

- Location within Idaho
- Type: Cenotaph complex and educational park
- Location: Near the Boise Public Library
- Nearest city: Boise, Idaho
- Coordinates: 43°36′35″N 116°12′31″W
- Area: .81 acres (0.33 ha)

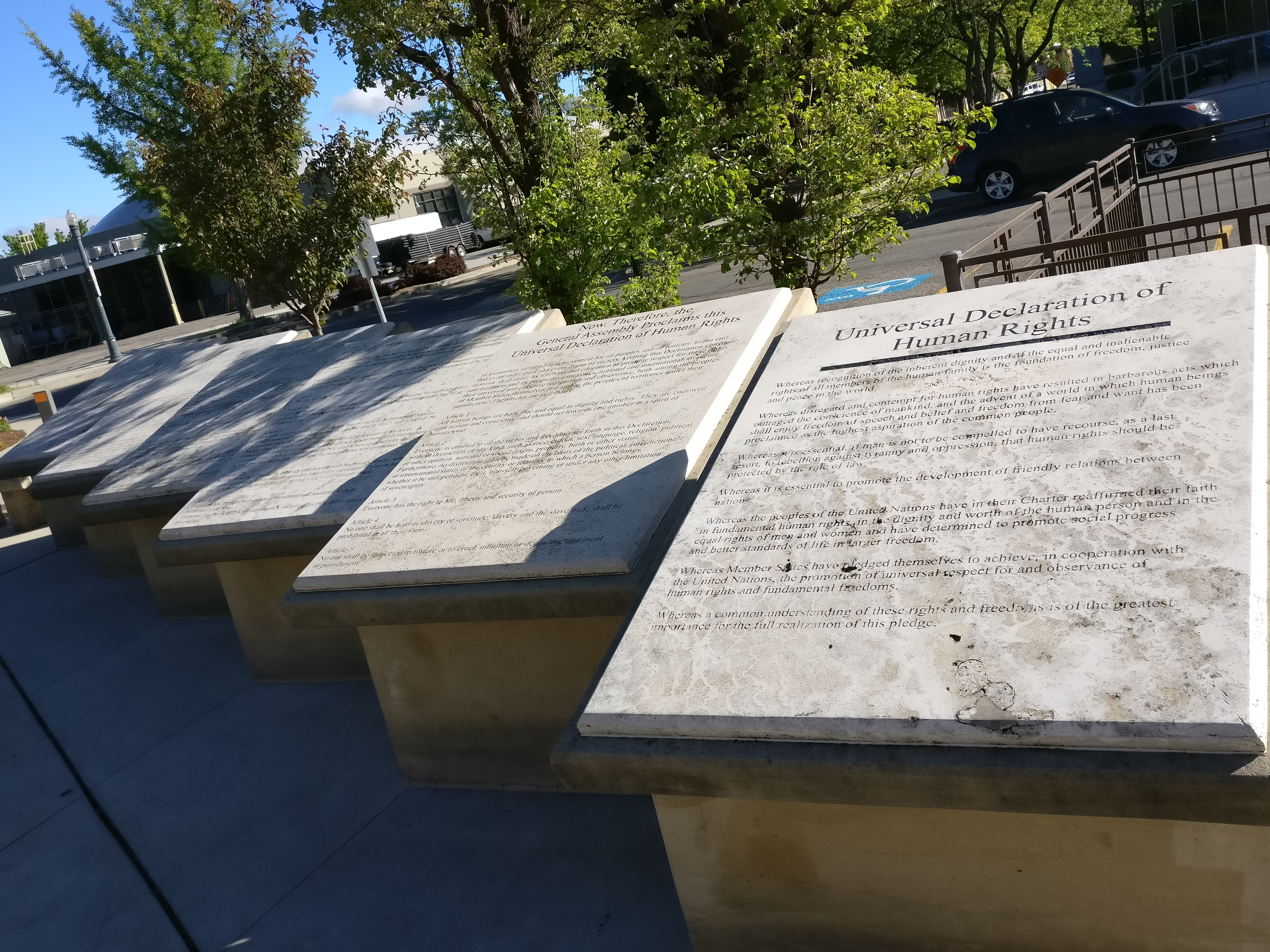
The first plaque of the Universal Declaration of Human Rights in monumental form was the first item subjected to vandalism

The Anne Frank Human Rights Memorial is a .81-acre (0.33 ha) cenotaph complex and educational park in Boise, Idaho near the Boise Public Library and the Greenbelt, the centerpiece of which is a statue of Anne Frank. The complex is jointly maintained by the Wassmuth Center for Human Rights and the Boise Department of Parks and Recreation, and is the only Anne Frank memorial in the U.S. Designed by Idaho Falls architect Kurt Karst, a sapling of the Anne Frank Tree and quotations from some sixty notables and unknowns (including poets, activists, politicians and diplomats, those who survived the Holocaust, and those who did not) are prominent installations. It also features one of the few installations where the full text of the Universal Declaration of Human Rights is on permanent public display. The park has been recognized and accepted by the International Coalition of Sites of Conscience. It was thoroughly renovated in September 2018, with an outdoor classroom and a new sculpture, "The Spiral of Injustice."

Museum researcher Brigitte Sion has written that in seeking to use Anne Frank as a symbol for various universal and parochial issues, the memorial offers a sanitized version of Anne Frank that denies the reality of her history. Sion writes "Nothing in the Boise memorial's mission statement, its official literature, or at the site itself directly identifies Anne Frank as a Jewish victim of the Holocaust or explains the reason for her hiding, let alone for her arrest, deportation, and death in a Nazi concentration camp".

The site not only serves as a convenient staging area for rallies, marches, and protests (and more generally as a contemplative spot), it is where the Boise Police Department take their newly commissioned officers before field training.

== Vandalism ==
In early May 2017 the plaque featuring the beginning of the complete Universal Declaration of Human Rights was vandalized with antisemitic graffiti in red marker; more generally two different areas of the site were also defaced over the next few days with racist slurs against black people and Jews causing $20,000 in damage, due in part to the botched initial attempts at repair. The vandalism, the first since the memorial's dedication in 2002, is being investigated as a potential hate crime, and numerous donations for repair have poured in.

In December 2020, the memorial was defamed with pieces of paper reading "we are everywhere" and depiction of a swastika. This prompted Mayor Lauren McLean to say, "Bad actors who use racist and violent rhetoric are not welcome in this community."

== Gallery ==
A brief video clip of the memorial's Quote Walls

A brief video clip at the memorial's centerpiece

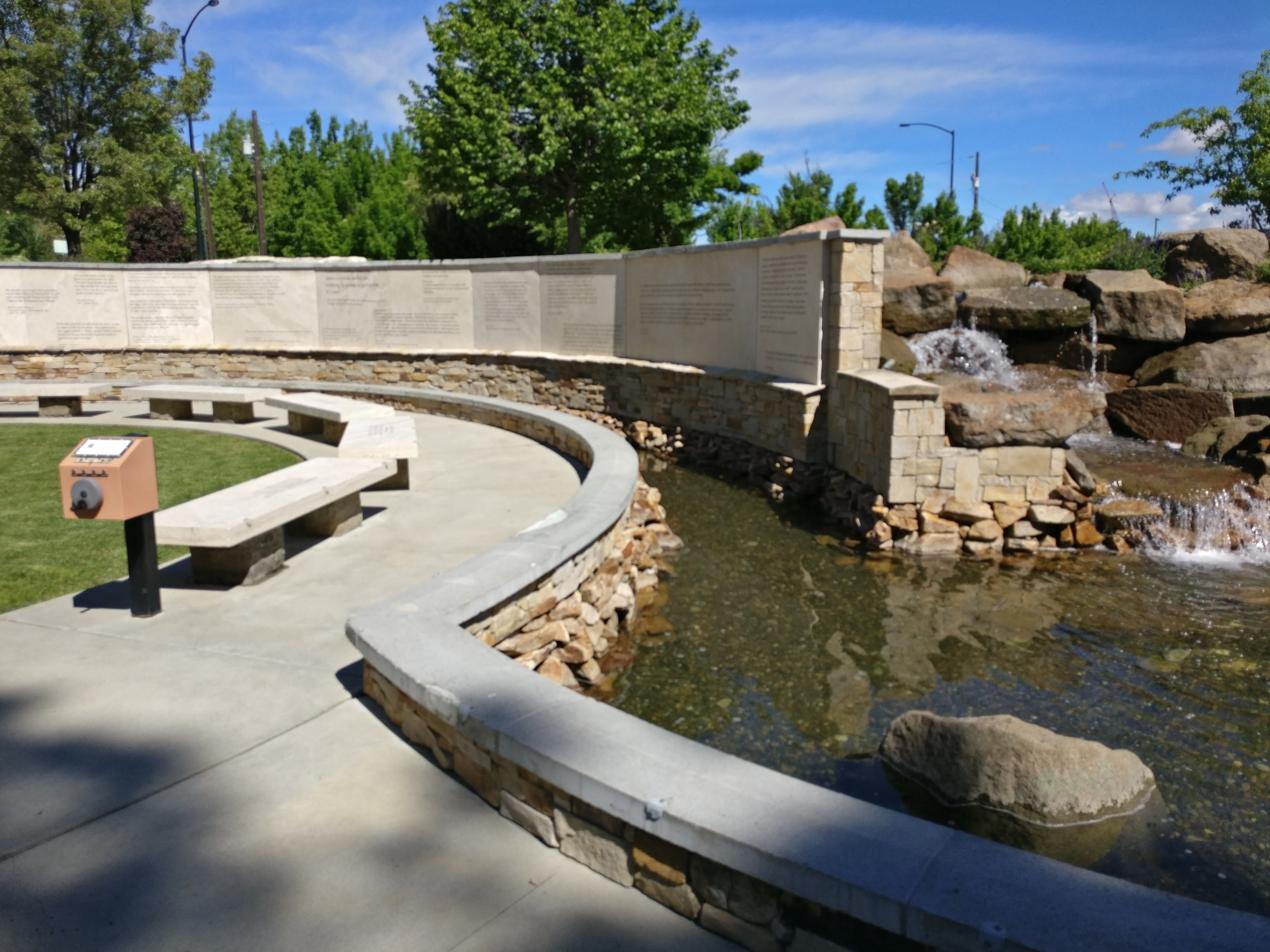
Running water

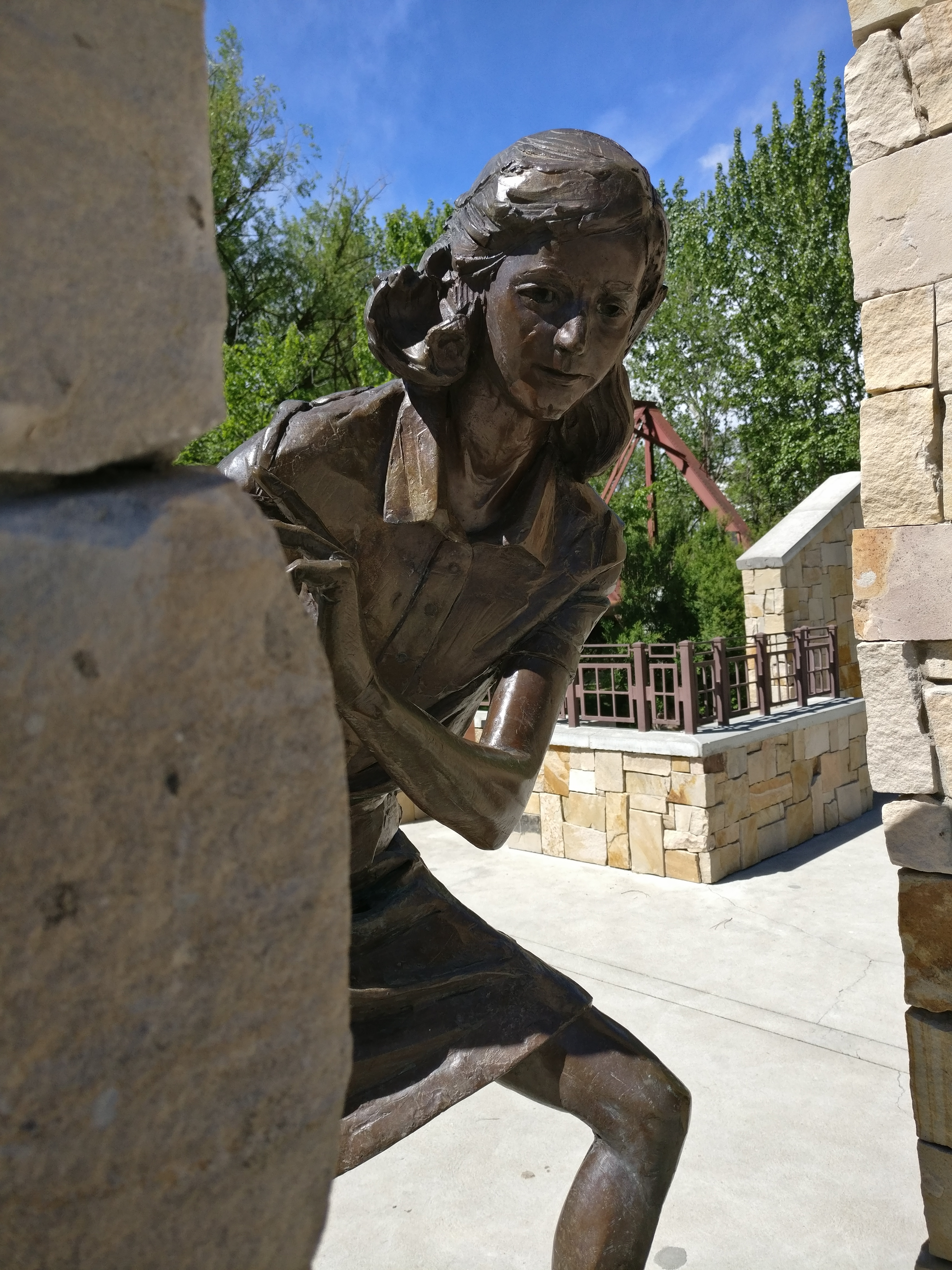
Cenotaph detail

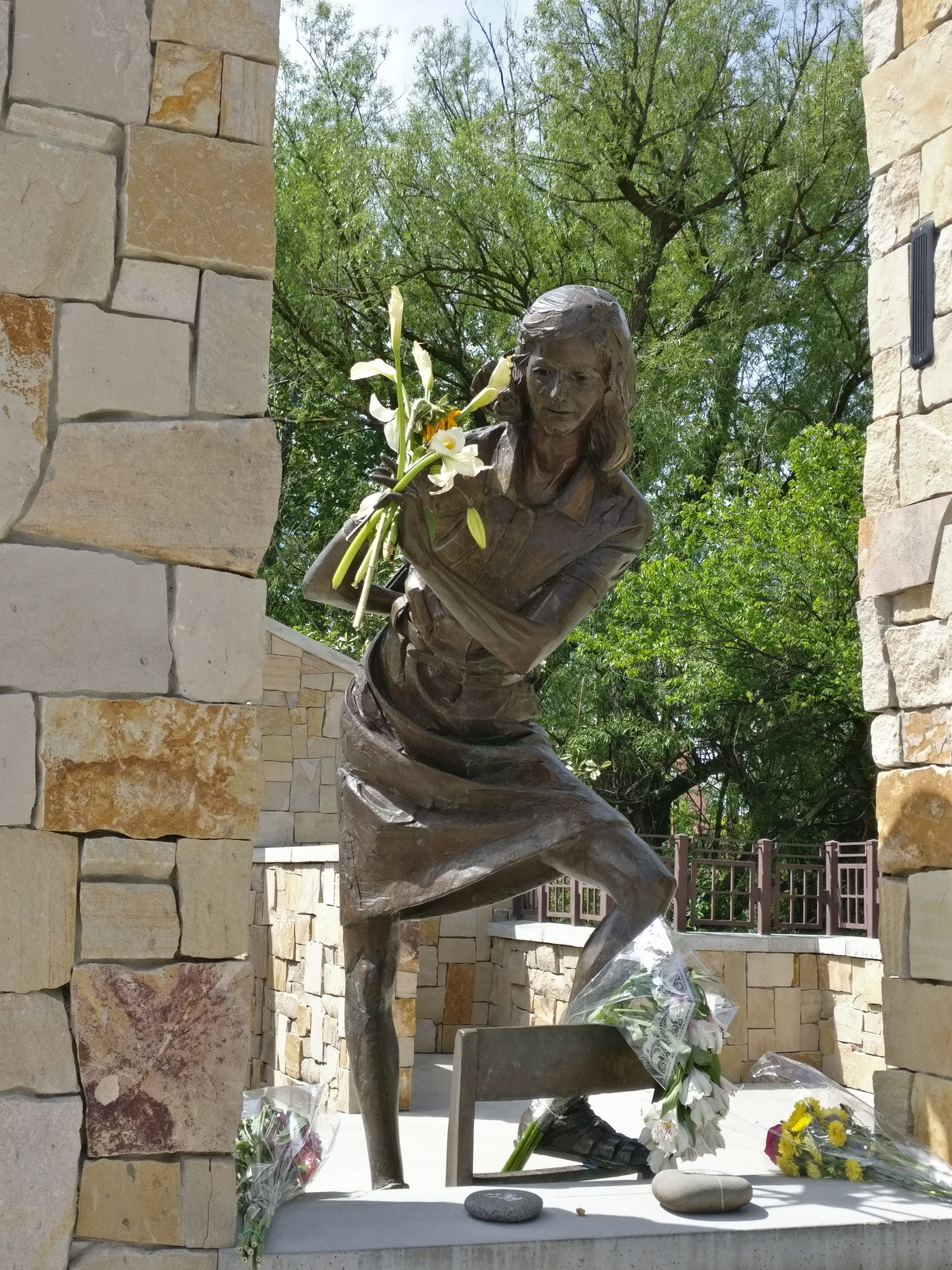
Orchids left in homage

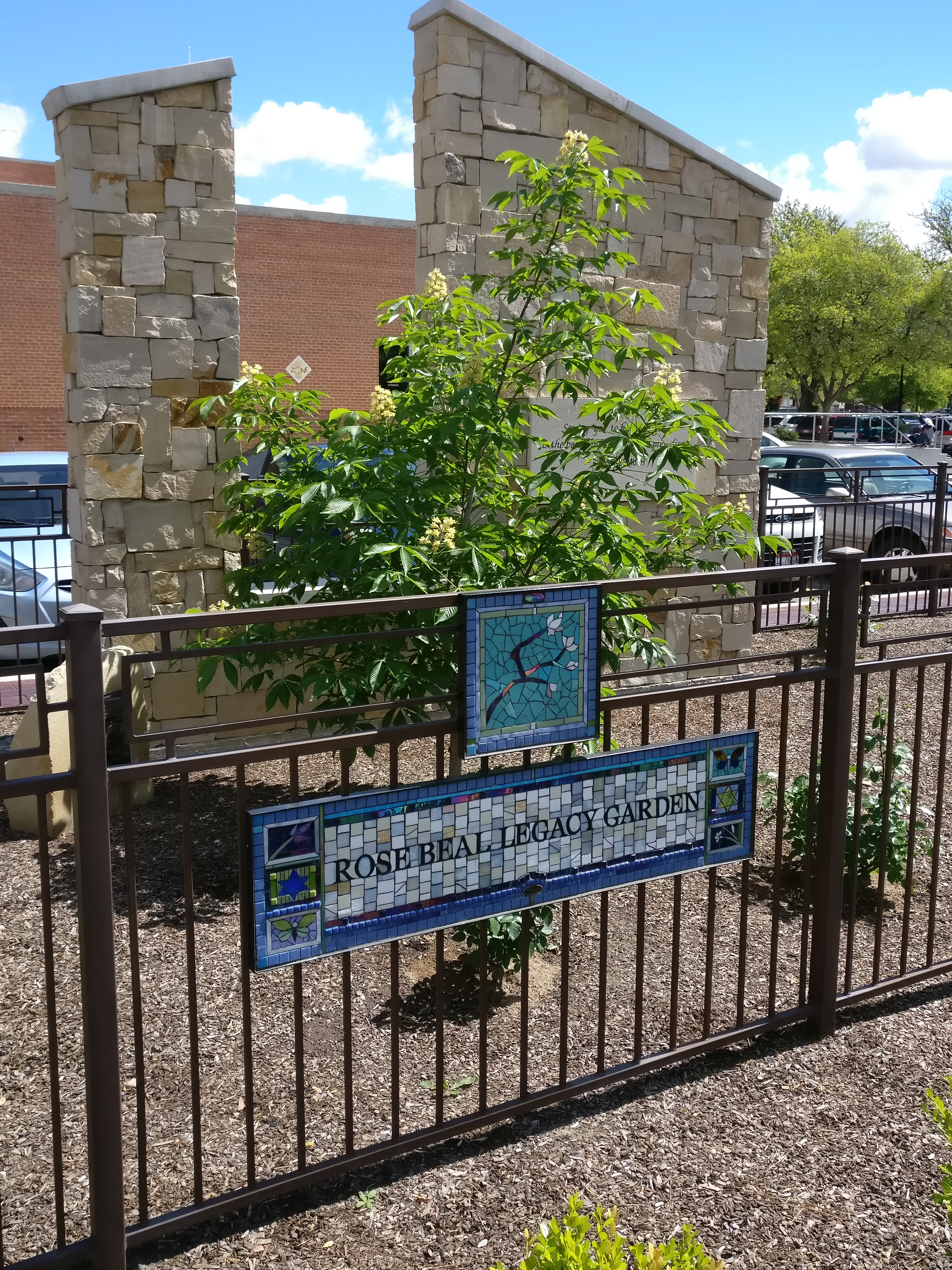
One of the only 11 Anne Frank saplings in the United States

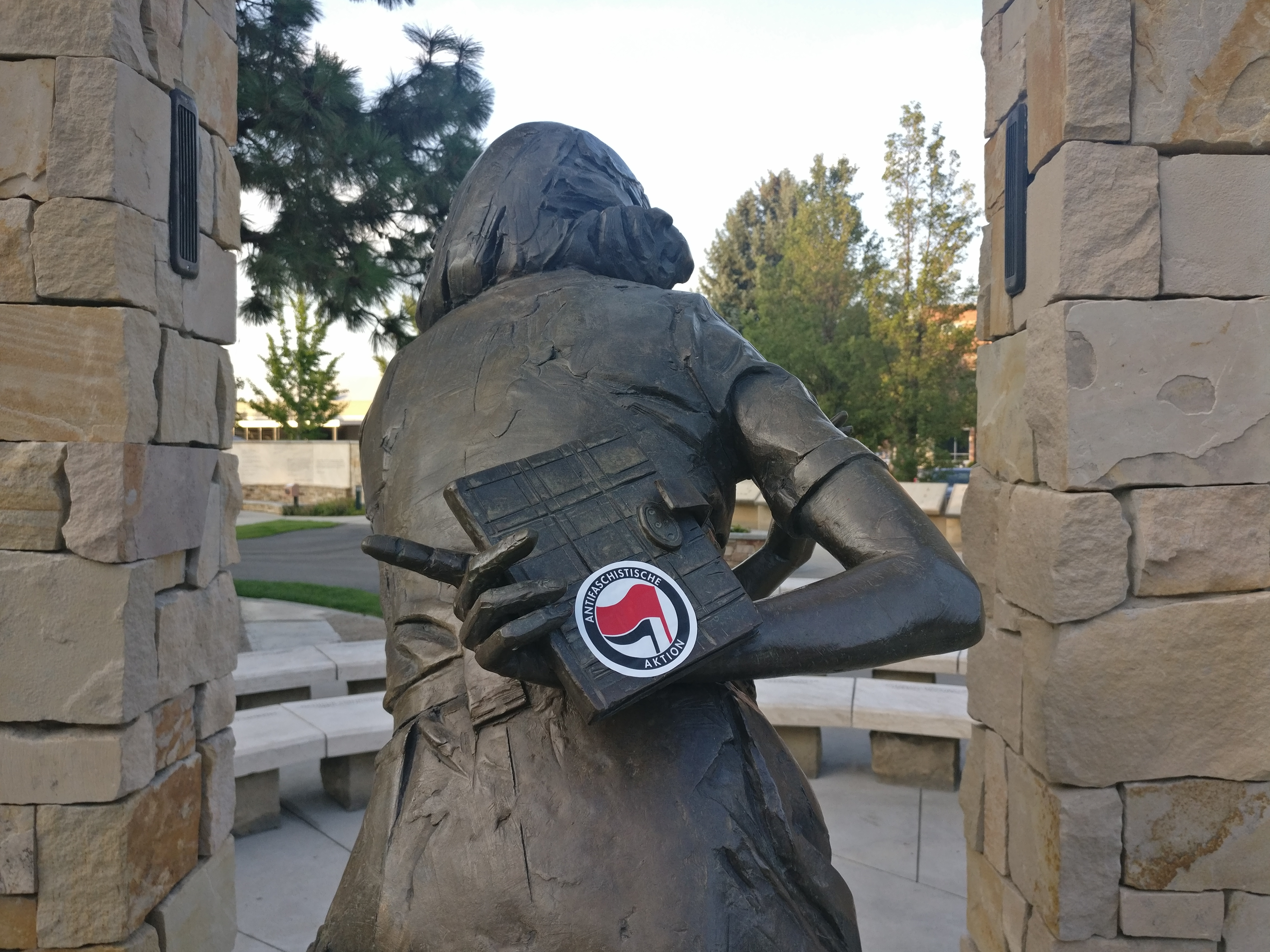
An Antifa sticker placed on the representation of Anne Frank's diary

== See also ==
- Ten stages of genocide
- List of parks in Boise
