= Anne Frank tree =

Tree in Amsterdam, Netherlands

Coordinates: 52°22′30.7″N 4°53′4.7″E

The Anne Frank tree (Dutch: Anne Frankboom or, incorrectly, Anne Frank boom) was a horse-chestnut tree (Aesculus hippocastanum) in the city center of Amsterdam that was featured in Anne Frank's The Diary of a Young Girl. Anne Frank described the tree from The Annex, the building where she and her family were hiding from the Nazis during World War II.

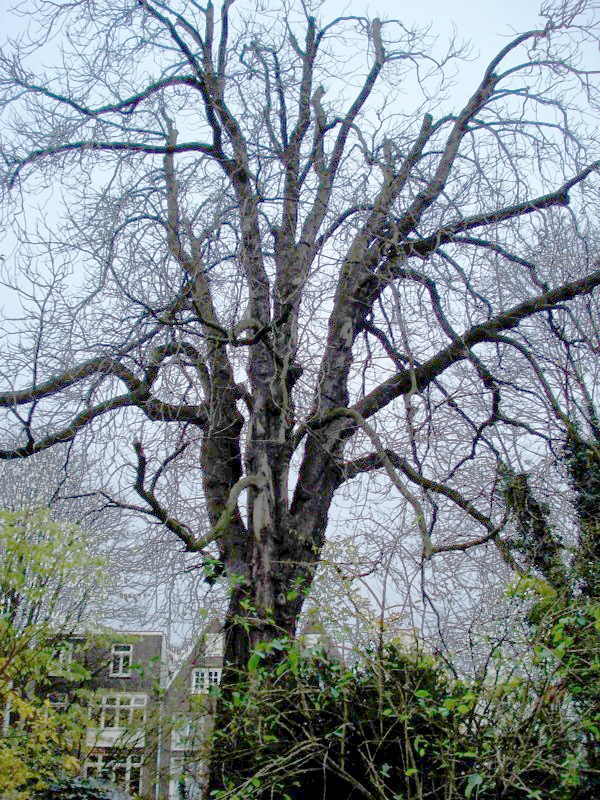
The Anne Frank Tree in 2006

Over the years, the tree deteriorated significantly due to both a fungus and a moth infestation. The Borough Amsterdam Centrum declared that the tree had to be cut down on 20 November 2007 due to the risk that it could otherwise fall down. However, on 21 November 2007, a judge issued a temporary injunction stopping the removal. The Foundation and the neighbours developed an alternative plan to save the tree. The neighbours and supporters formed the Foundation Support Anne Frank Tree which carried out the suggested supporting construction and took over the maintenance of the tree.

On 23 August 2010, the tree was blown down by high winds during a storm, breaking off approximately 1 metre (3 feet) above ground. It fell across a garden wall and damaged garden sheds but did not damage anything else. The tree was estimated to be more than 170 years old, meaning that it sprouted c. 1840 – c. 1860.

== Anne Frank ==
The tree is mentioned three times in Anne Frank's diary The Diary of a Young Girl. On 23 February 1944, she writes about the tree:

Ik ga haast elke ochtend naar de zolder waar Peter werkt om de bedompte kamerlucht uit mijn longen te laten waaien. Vanuit mijn lievelingsplekje op de grond kijk ik naar de blauwe hemel, naar de kale kastanjeboom aan wiens takken kleine druppeltjes schitteren, naar de meeuwen en de andere vogels, die in hun scheervlucht wel van zilver lijken. [...] 'Zolang dit nog bestaat', dacht ik 'en ik het mag beleven, deze zonneschijn, die hemel waaraan geen wolk is, zolang kan ik niet treurig zijn'.
Nearly every morning I go to the attic where Peter works to blow the stuffy air out of my lungs, from my favorite spot on the floor I look up at the blue sky and the bare chestnut tree, on whose branches droplets shine, and at the seagulls and other birds as they glide like silver. [...] As long as this exists, I thought, and I may live to see it, this sunshine, the cloudless skies, while this lasts I cannot be sad.

Otto Frank, Anne's father, described his thoughts upon reading the diary for the first time in a 1968 speech. He described his surprise at learning of the tree's importance to Anne as follows:

How could I have suspected that it meant so much to Anne to see a patch of blue sky, to observe the gulls during their flight and how important the chestnut tree was to her, as I recall that she never took an interest in nature. But she longed for it during that time when she felt like a caged bird. She only found consolation in thinking about nature. But she had kept such feelings completely to herself.

== Interactive project ==
The Anne Frank Tree is also the name of an interactive project started by the Anne Frank House in 2006, when it was opened by Emma Thompson. Visitors to the museum are able to leave their name and location on a "leaf" of the tree, showing their affinity with Anne Frank. Part of the intended audience of the on-line project are students of the more than 200 schools in the world named after Anne Frank.

== Decline ==
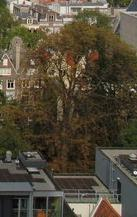
The tree in 2003

Concerns about the tree's health date back to at least 1993, when a soil analysis revealed that leakage from a nearby underground domestic fuel tank was endangering the tree's root system. The city of Amsterdam spent €160,000 on an environmental remediation program to save the tree. During the last several years of its life, the tree was attacked by a particularly aggressive fungus (initially misidentified as Ganoderma applanatum, but later confirmed to be Ganoderma adspersum through DNA analysis), which rotted the wood and undermined the tree's stability. Additionally, horse-chestnut leaf miner moth caterpillars (Cameraria ohridella) ate the tree's leaves, causing them to turn brown prematurely and fall off.

On 26 May 2005, the tree's crown was drastically trimmed after a six-month study by botanists concluded that this was the best way to ensure the tree's stability. However, the fungal disease continued to thrive, and a 2006 study estimated that 42% of the wood was rotten. Some botanists concluded that the tree's death was unavoidable and the owner of the property decided to ask for a permit to cut the tree down in order to eliminate the risk of the huge tree collapsing.

In September 2007, an appeals panel made two decisions: one upholding the right of the tree's owner to have it cut down any time in the next two years, and one granting a request by the country's Trees Institute to investigate the possibility of saving it. Property owner Henric Pomes of Keizersgracht 188, adjacent to the building that is now the Anne Frank Museum, agreed to wait for the institute's proposal, due before 1 January 2008.

On 2 October 2007, and later the Dutch Tree Foundation (Dutch: Bomenstichting), was involved in the discussions. On 15 November 2007, it claimed the tree was healthy enough to cause no danger, based upon second opinion analysis by Neville Fay (a famous English expert of ancient trees) and by Frits Gielissen (a Dutch expert from O.B.T.A. De Linde).

On 13 November 2007, the Borough Amsterdam-Centrum declared that it would cut down the tree on 21 November 2007. The next day, a pulling test was banned, but four days after that, this assessment of the strength of the tree was conducted. Boom-KCB, an engineering firm specialized in trees, determined that the tree was "storm-proof", and able to sustain itself, eliminating the need for outside interference as it did not pose a danger for the public. A court hearing involving the Tree Foundation was held the day before the scheduled removal. On 21 November 2007, it was decided to stop the removal. On the same day, the Borough and the Anne Frank Foundation held a press conference during which they repeated their claim that there existed an "acute danger". They urged the Mayor of Amsterdam, Job Cohen, to proceed with emergency cutting.

On 17 December 2007, the working committee Support Anne Frank Tree presented its alternative plan to preserve the tree (the report has English abstracts & conclusions) which included a construction to prevent the trunk from breaking down. Some weeks later, tree experts from both sides presented a joint evaluation of the tree. Their judgment was that the tree had a life expectancy of at least 5–15 years. To ensure safety, the supporting construction should be built.

In May 2008 the supporting structure was finished: it was designed to help the tree to survive at least five more years.

On 23 August 2010, the tree was blown over in a rain-and-gale storm, breaking off about a meter (3 feet) above the ground. It fell across a garden wall and damaged garden sheds but did not damage anything else. The next day, it was reported that a small side shoot was growing out of the stump below where it broke, and it is hoped that it will grow into a new tree. There are plans to keep large pieces of the fallen trunk and its large branches. The fallen tree is estimated to weigh about 27 metric tons. Some of the images in the Reuters report show, for most of the cross-section of the trunk, the characteristic fracture pattern of decayed wood across all the trunk cross-section except a thin rim of sapwood. The fallen wood has now been removed.

== Saplings ==
In 2007, a sapling was planted in Jardin Anne-Frank (Paris, France).

Thirteen saplings from the tree have been distributed in the United States to museums, schools, parks and Holocaust remembrance centers through a project led by The Anne Frank Center USA. The first sapling was planted in April 2013 at The Children's Museum of Indianapolis. Other saplings were sent to Liberty Park in New York City, honoring victims of September 11 attacks; Central High School in Little Rock, Arkansas which was the center of a desegregation battle; the Clinton Presidential Center, also in Little Rock, in partnership with the city's Congregation B'nai Israel Sisterhood; and sites in California, Idaho, Iowa, Massachusetts, Michigan, Washington, D.C., and Washington state.

In the summer of 2010, a sapling was planted in Batsford Arboretum near Moreton-in-Marsh, Gloucestershire. On 25 February 2015, a sapling was planted in Lister Park, Bradford. Another of the tree's saplings grows in front of the Holocaust Education Center in Fukuyama, Japan; it was planted in January 2011.

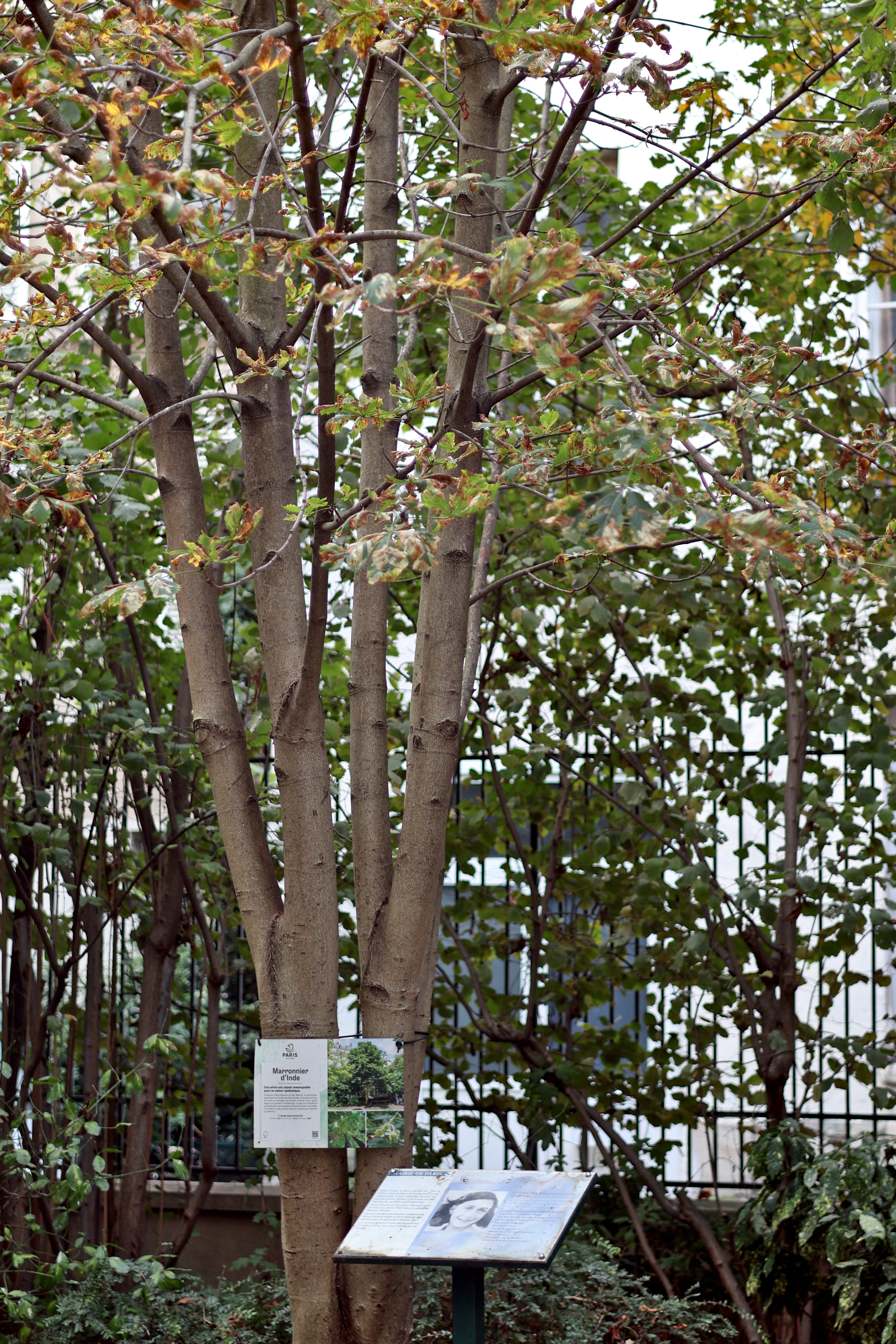
A sapling of Anne Frank's tree in Paris

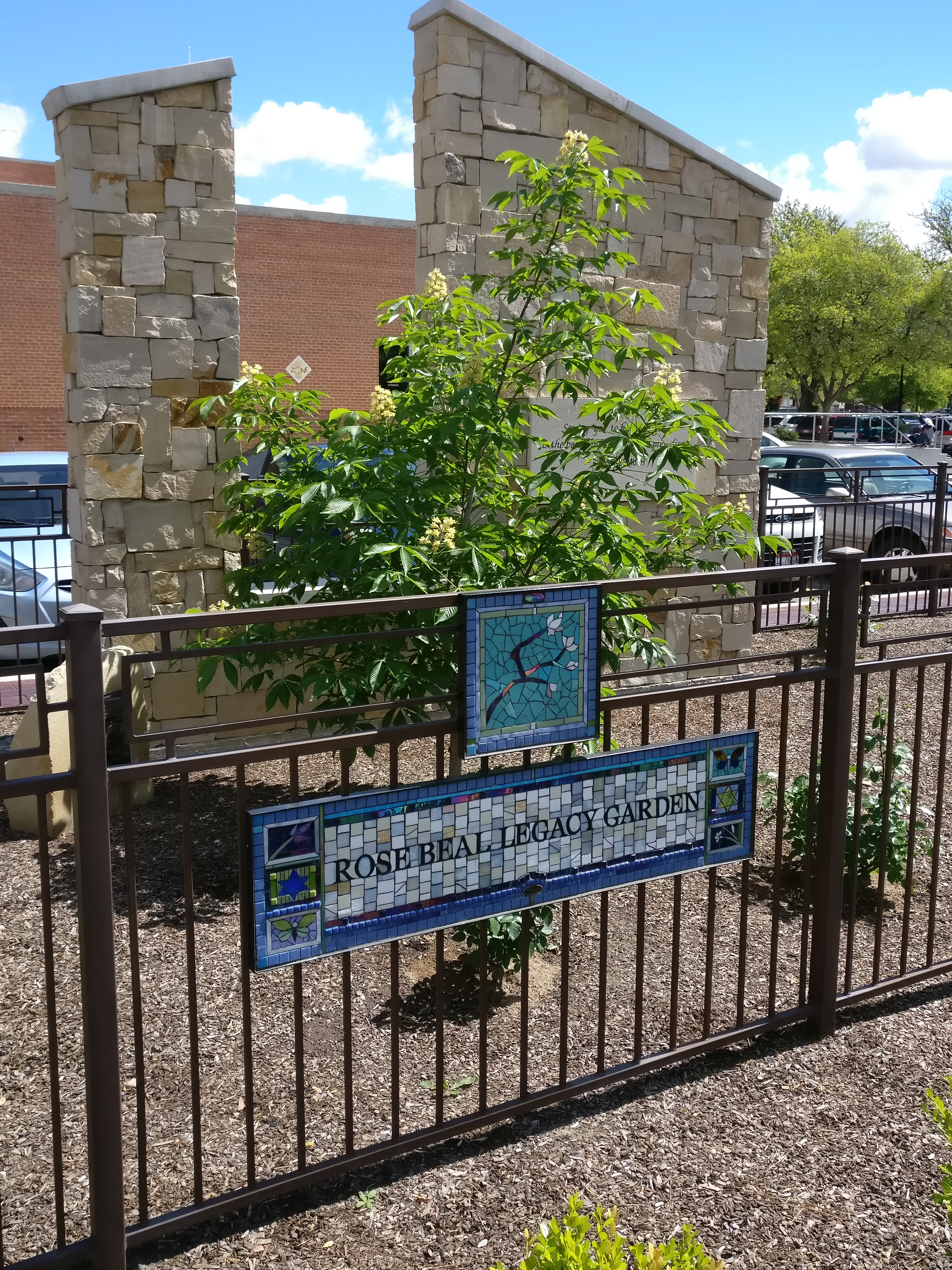
One of the thirteen saplings in the U.S. is at the Anne Frank Human Rights Memorial in Boise, Idaho

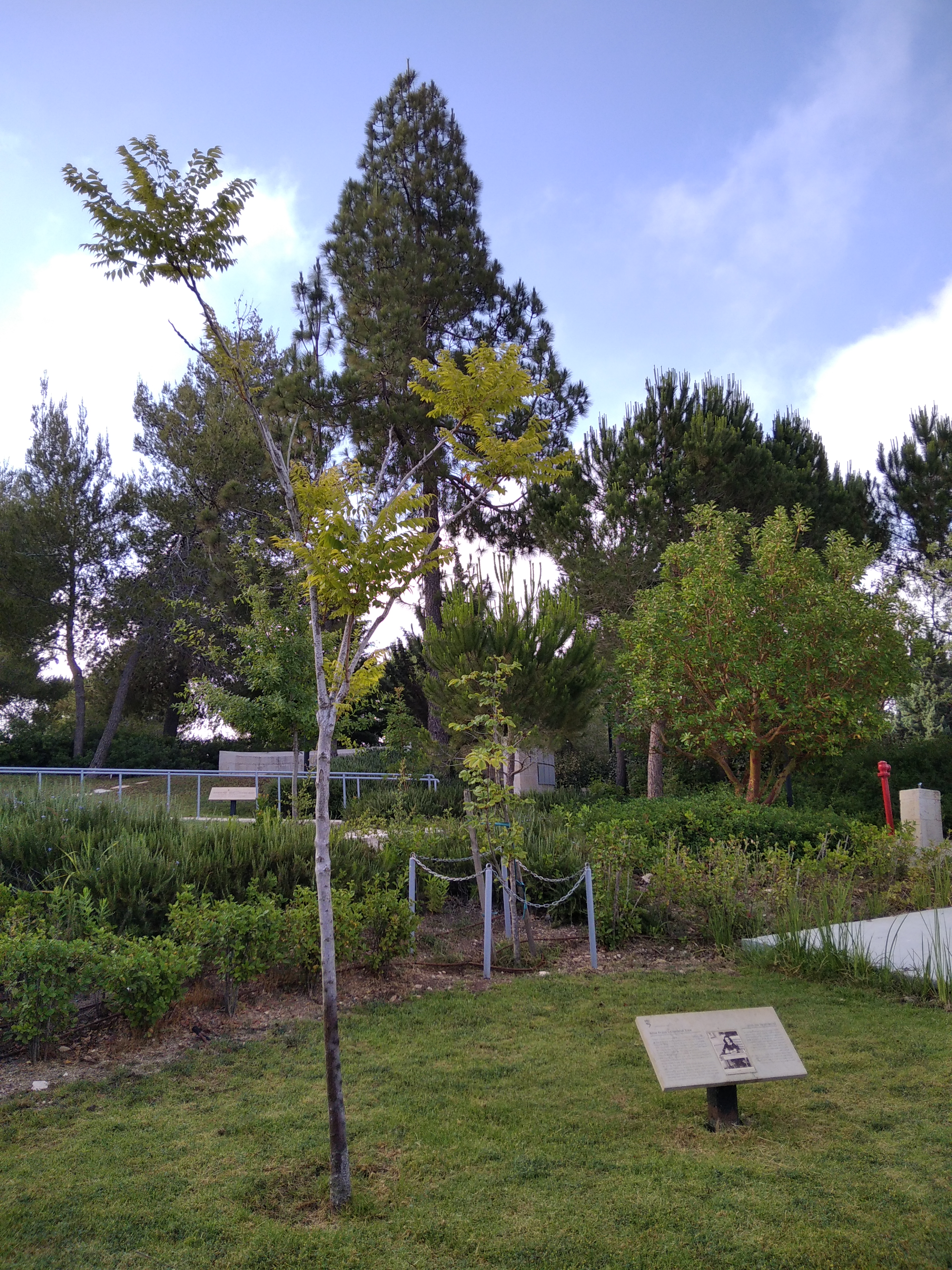
A sapling of Anne Frank's tree in Yad Vashem, Jerusalem

== See also ==
- List of individual trees
