= De oppresso liber =

Motto of the United States Army Special Forces

United States Army Special Forces distinctive unit insignia; the World War II V-42 stiletto fighting knife in the middle of the unit insignia and 2 crossed arrows is facing point upwards.

De oppresso liber is the motto of the United States Army Special Forces.

== Meaning ==
=== United States Army Special Forces tradition ===
In the United States Army Special Forces, the motto is traditionally believed to mean "to free from oppression" or "to liberate the oppressed" in Latin.

=== Actual translation ===
A correct translation of the Latin phrase de oppresso liber would be "from (being) an oppressed man, (to being) a free one".

==== Grammatical structure ====
The preposition de here means "from" in the sense of a change from one status to another, not intending separation from the oppressed, but moving from a source in the oppressed. Compare Ovid Fasti 5, 616: inque deum de bove versus erat, "he had been changed from an ox into a god", or Juvenal 7, 197: fies de rhetore consul, "from an orator you will become a consul". Oppresso is the past participle of opprimere ("to oppress") in the ablative case as governed by de, meaning "an oppressed person". The adjective Liber is in the nominative case, "a free person".

==== Similar phrases ====
The motto resembles a quote from St. Augustine: corripiendi sunt inquieti, [...] oppressi liberandi, "the turbulent have to be corrected, [...] the oppressed to be liberated". See also Isaiah 1:17: subvenite oppresso, "relieve the oppressed".

== Lineage ==
The motto is associated with the distinctive unit insignia of the United States Army Special Forces. The lineage-and-honors history for the 10th Special Forces Group describes the insignia as combining the crossed-arrow collar insignia of the World War II First Special Service Force with the fighting knife issued to that force, and translates the motto as "From Oppression We Will Liberate Them". The insignia was approved on 8 July 1960. The U.S. Army translates De oppresso liber as "To Liberate the Oppressed" and states that the phrase refers to one of Special Forces' primary missions: training and combat-advising foreign indigenous forces.

Special Forces' roots date to World War II organizations including the Office of Strategic Services and the First Special Service Force, which specialized in behind-the-lines guerrilla warfare and commando operations. Army Special Operations Forces history likewise identifies the OSS as a legacy organization of U.S. Army special operations. Several OSS veterans, including Aaron Bank, brought unconventional warfare tactics and techniques to Special Forces in the early 1950s.

During World War II, OSS Special Operations participated in Project Jedburgh, a joint Allied program involving the OSS, the British Special Operations Executive, and the French Bureau Central de Renseignements et d'Action. The Jedburgh mission supplemented existing resistance circuits, helping organize and arm resistance groups, arranging supply drops, gathering intelligence, providing liaison between the Allies and the Resistance, and participating in sabotage operations; 93 Jedburgh teams parachuted into France. Separately, 29 OSS Secret Intelligence teams under the SUSSEX program were sent into occupied France.

Bank, popularly known as the "Father of Special Forces", served in the OSS Special Operations branch and led Jedburgh Team Packard behind German lines in occupied France after D-Day. His team supported French Resistance factions and trained partisan groups in guerrilla warfare. After the war, Bank helped formulate the doctrine and principles that became the foundation of modern Special Forces, prepared the training plan and developed the Table of Organization and Equipment for the new Special Forces unit, and became the first commander of the 10th Special Forces Group in 1952. Bank was the Jedburgh veteran with the closest connection to Army Special Forces and many Jedburgh tactics and techniques were adopted in early Special Forces training in the 1950s. Modern U.S. special operations doctrine defines unconventional warfare as activities conducted to enable a resistance movement or insurgency to coerce, disrupt, or overthrow a government or occupying power by operating through or with an underground, auxiliary, and guerrilla force in a denied area.

== Sculpture ==
The sculpture America's Response Monument is subtitled De Oppresso Liber. It is a life-and-a-half scale bronze statue located in the West Street lobby of One World Financial Center opposite Ground Zero in New York City. Unofficially known as the Horse Soldier Statue, it is the first public monument dedicated to the United States Special Forces and commemorates the servicemen and women of America's Special Operations response to 9/11, including those who fought in the early days of Operation Enduring Freedom, which led to the initial defeat of the Taliban in Afghanistan. It was conceived by a private citizen, sculptor Douwe Blumberg, and commissioned by an anonymous group of Wall Street bankers who lost friends in the 9/11 attacks.

The statue was dedicated on November 11, 2011, in a ceremony led by Vice President Joe Biden and Lt. Gen. John Mulholland, commander of Special Operations Command.
