= America's Response Monument =

Statue memorializing the September 11 attacks and US invasion of Afghanistan

- 'De Oppresso Liber', Horse Soldier Statue
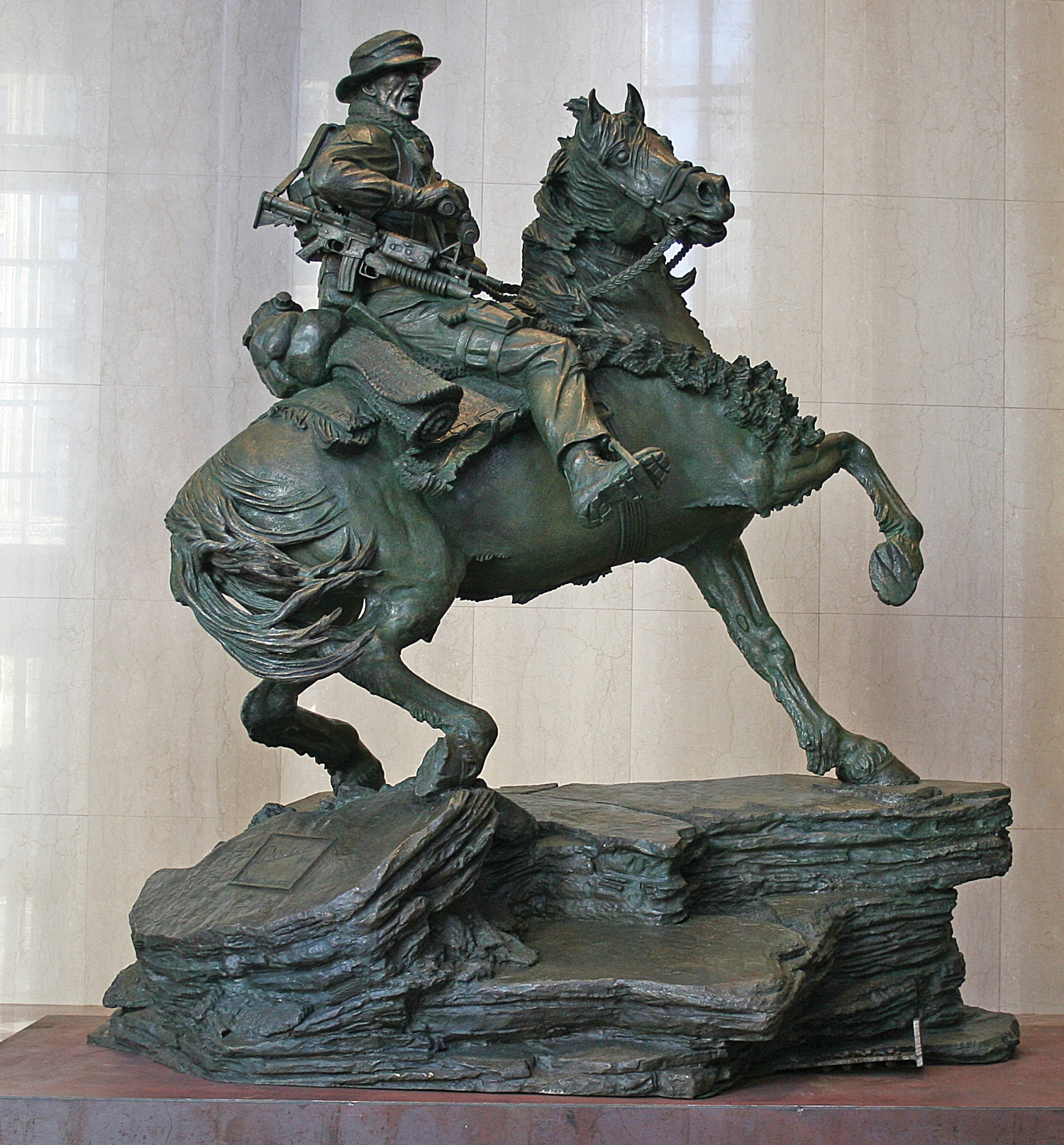
- America's Response Monument
- Artist: Douwe Blumberg
- Year: 2011
- Medium: Bronze sculpture
- Dimensions: 490 cm × 210 cm × 400 cm (16 ft × 7 ft × 13 ft)
- Weight: 5,000 pounds (2,300 kg)
- Location: Liberty Park, World Trade Center, New York City; 40°42′37.4826″N 74°0′50.6982″W

America's Response Monument, subtitled De Oppresso Liber, is a life-and-a-half scale bronze statue in Liberty Park overlooking the National September 11 Memorial & Museum in New York City. Unofficially known as the Horse Soldier Statue, it is the first publicly accessible monument dedicated to the United States Army Special Forces. It was also the first monument near Ground Zero to recognize heroes of the September 11 terrorist attacks.

The statue was conceived by sculptor Douwe Blumberg and first sold in 2003 as a small-scale, 18 inches (460 mm) version. In April 2011, an anonymous group of Wall Street bankers who lost friends in the attacks commissioned a large, 16-foot (4.9 m) tall version. It was dedicated on Veterans Day, November 11, 2011, in a ceremony led by Vice President Joe Biden and Lt. Gen. John Mulholland, commander of Task Force Dagger and U.S. Army Special Operations Command during Operation Enduring Freedom.

The statue commemorates the service members of America's Special Operations forces and their response to the attacks, including those who fought during the first stages of the Afghanistan war. This operation led to the initial defeat of the Taliban in Afghanistan, although the Taliban would ultimately regain power following their 20-year-long war with the United States.

== Background ==
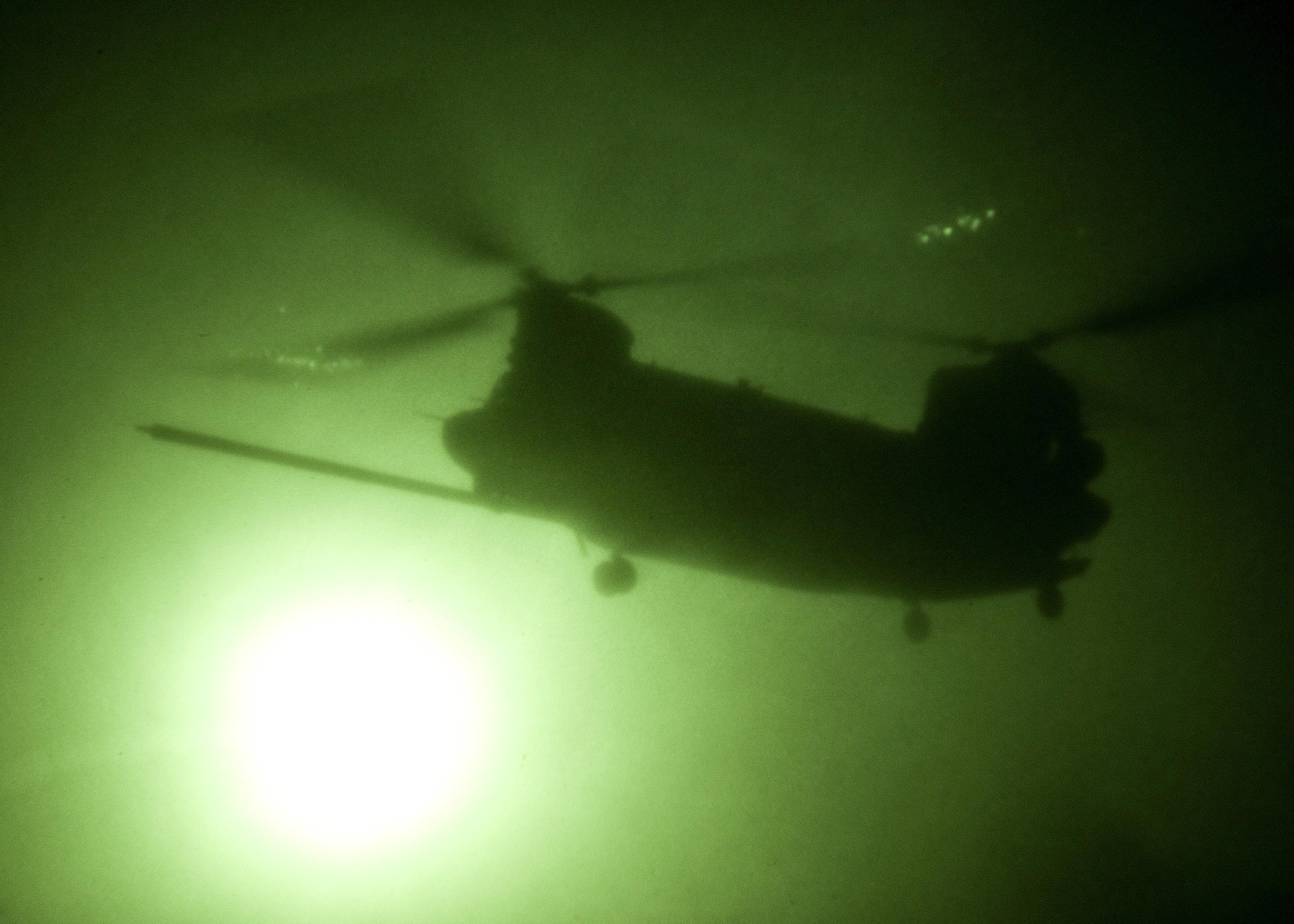
The Special Operations team was inserted into Afghanistan at night aboard two MH-47 Chinook helicopters.

The artist, Douwe Blumberg, had been a horse trainer for 18 years and is a military history buff. He was inspired to begin the sculpture by a photo that Defense Secretary Donald Rumsfeld displayed at a press conference at the Naval Training Center Great Lakes, Illinois, on November 16, 2001, shortly after U.S. forces entered Afghanistan.

As part of Operation Enduring Freedom, President George W. Bush sent covert forces into Afghanistan to help the Northern Alliance defeat the Taliban. The group, named Task Force Dagger, was a joint Special Operations team consisting of Green Berets from the 5th Special Forces Group, aircrew members from the 160th Special Operations Aviation Regiment ("Nightstalkers"), and Air Force Combat Controllers.

=== Flight into Afghanistan ===
The 12-man Operational Detachment Alpha 595 (ODA 595) team, along with two Air Force combat controllers, were the second group of Task Force Dagger to enter Afghanistan. In the first operation of its kind, they were flown from a former Soviet airbase, now named the Karshi-Khanabad Air Base, in Uzbekistan. More than 300 kilometers (190 mi) were flown across the 16,000-foot (4,900 m) Hindu Kush mountains in zero-visibility conditions by a SOAR MH-47E Chinook helicopter. They were dropped onto a farmer's field at 02:00 on October 19, 2001, about 80 km (50 mi) south of Mazar-i-Sharif in the Dari-a-Souf Valley. The team arrived only 39 days after the Al-Qaeda attack on the World Trade Center for what they thought would be a year-long stay. They linked up with the Northern Alliance, led by General Dostum.

=== Horseback transportation ===
Once they arrived in-country, they needed transportation suitable for the difficult mountainous terrain of Northern Afghanistan. The Afghan tribes offered the men the only transportation available: small Afghan horses. Only two men had any experience on horseback. Capt. Mark Nutsch, commander of ODA-595, who grew up on a ranch riding horses, gave quick lessons to the others.

Capt. Will Summers, Special Forces team leader, said, "It was as if The Jetsons had met The Flintstones." The mostly inexperienced riders soon requested replacements for the traditional small, hard, wooden saddles used by the Afghan soldiers. A supply of lightweight, Australian-style saddles was airdropped in mid-November. The last U.S. Army unit to fight on horseback was the U.S. Army's 26th Cavalry Regiment. On January 16, 1942, Troop G encountered Japanese forces at the village of Morong, and Lieutenant Edwin P. Ramsey ordered a cavalry charge. The last troops to receive training on horseback were the 28th Cavalry in 1943.

=== Initial attack against the Taliban ===
On October 21, the Northern Alliance led by General Dostum prepared to attack the fortified village of Bishqab, defended by the Taliban and equipped with several T-54/55 tanks, a number of BMPs (armored personnel carriers) armed with cannons and machine guns, and several ZSU-23 anti-aircraft artillery pieces. The Northern Alliance totaled about 1,500 cavalry and 1,500 light infantry. They were assisted by the 12-member U.S. Special Forces team and American air power. To reach the enemy, they crossed a mile-wide open plain cut by seven ridges that would leave them completely exposed to enemy fire. To the U.S. Special Forces, it looked like the Charge of the Light Brigade, Battle of Fredericksburg, and Pickett's Charge at Gettysburg, all at the same time. Supported by American air power and precision-guided munitions, they successfully attacked the Taliban, many of whom threw away their weapons and ran.

The next day, the Northern Alliance prepared to attack Cōbaki, in Balkh Province, 121 kilometres (75 mi) south of Mazar-i-Sharif. The U.S. Special Ops teams used SOFLAM Laser Target Designators to identify targets for air strikes on the enemy armor and artillery. The Northern Alliance followed this with a cavalry charge. When it looked like Dostum's cavalry charge would fail, several members of ODA 595 rode into action and helped win the battle. "It was like out of the Old Testament," commented Lt. Col. Max Bowers, former commander of three Special Forces horseback teams. "You expected Cecil B. DeMille to be filming and Charlton Heston to walk out."

=== Soldier photo ===
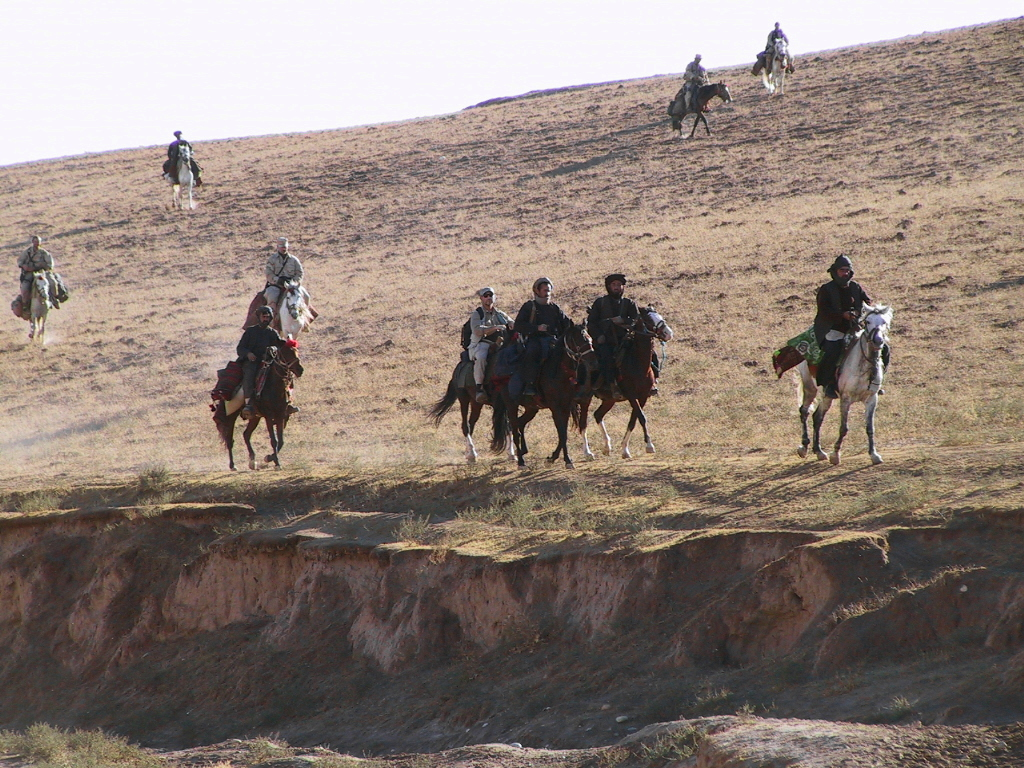
U.S. Special Operations, members of ODA 595 and Force Dagger, and Afghan forces on horseback in northern Afghanistan during October 2001. This photo inspired Blumberg to create the sculpture.

During a news conference on November 15, 2001, Defense Secretary Donald Rumsfeld displayed a photo of ODA 595 riding across a field on Afghan horses. When sculptor Blumberg saw that image, he said he was "riveted" and felt impressed that he had to do something.

Being a military history nut, an ex-horseman and a patriot, I was just blown away by the image of this 21st-century high-tech soldier on what could have been a 15th-century Afghan horse. It was iconic and ironic at the same time, on so many levels. First, the adaptability of these guys – they weren't trained on horseback. They just climbed up and went ... the first Americans to ride into combat on horses in over 50 years. So I see this picture and said, 'I have to do this.'

"The visual irony of a 21st-century, high-tech trooper mounted on a ragged Afghan mountain horse, unchanged for centuries, fascinated me." Despite the array of high-tech military gear they carried into battle, it was the trusty Afghan stallions that were essential to the campaign's success. The mounted US troops became known as the "horse soldiers".

== Production ==
=== Initial design ===
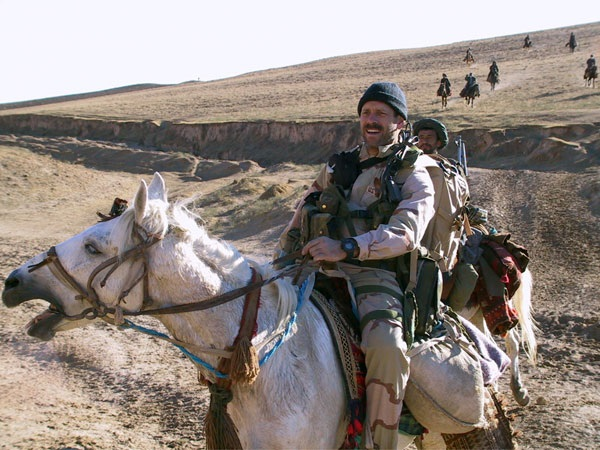
This picture of Air Force combat controller Staff Sgt. Bart Decker on an Afghan horse was a model for Blumberg when he began to design the statue. Decker rode with the U.S. Special Operations teams and Northern Alliance forces during the opening days of Operation Enduring Freedom.

After seeing the photo of the modern soldiers on horseback, Blumberg decided to create a statue to commemorate the actions of the service members of America's Special Operations who responded to the September 11 attacks, including the Special Operations forces who fought in the early stages of Operation Enduring Freedom. On his own initiative and expense, Blumberg took three months to complete a 1:6 scale, 18 inches (460 mm) tall bronze sculpture of a Green Beret riding an Afghan horse. In 2002, while at a show in Louisville, Kentucky, he brought the work in progress with him. A Vietnam-era Green Beret saw the work and told Lt. Col. Frank Hudson from the 5th Special Forces Group at Fort Campbell about the statue, who called Blumberg. Blumberg sent him pictures of the work. Hudson saw a number of inconsistencies between the statue and the reality of what happened in the field.

=== First version produced ===
Blumberg was invited to Fort Campbell, where he met members of the team who had only recently returned from Afghanistan. Capt. Mark Nutsch, commander of ODA-595, who grew up on a ranch riding horses, helped critique the statue for Blumberg. Blumberg learned that the statue needed considerable additional work. The soldiers showed Blumberg the indigenous horse tack made out of dried sinew that they had brought back from the war. Blumberg got the men's phone numbers and began collaborating with them to produce a highly accurate representation of a member of their team on horseback. Blumberg invited some of them to his studio, where they worked closely with him.

=== Small version made ===
Blumberg took another three months to re-sculpt the piece until he got the horse and soldier precisely correct. "This job is something I'm emotional about," Blumberg said. "This allows me to honor soldiers, capture a unique aspect of their service, and then have the opportunity to put it in New York. I couldn't have scripted it better. This is super powerful for me."

Blumberg cast 120 18-inch (460 mm) pieces for sale to the public and another 120 for sale to members of the special forces. On March 5, 2004, he presented a copy of his completed work to the John F. Kennedy Special Warfare Museum, the regimental museum for the U.S. Army Special Forces at Fort Bragg. In 2003, the non-profit Foundation for US Historical Monuments was formed to help build a monumental version, but their efforts came to nothing.

=== Wall Street backers ===
Eight years later, in March 2011, he received a call from a group of New York City Wall Street bankers who had lost friends and co-workers in the 9/11 attacks. Two of the individual Wall Street supporters said they were asked by families and friends if there was a place that individuals could go to remember the U.S. troops overseas who daily combat potential terrorist threats. "We wanted to do something for the special operations community and all military service branches because every day since 9/11, we've had to look at that hole in the ground," one of the private backers says. "What everyone needs to know is: There are people out there like this team, like the Green Berets, that are willing to sacrifice at all costs for them."

=== Large-scale version cast ===
The bankers commissioned a large-scale version to lead the Veterans Day parade only six months later. They

Later in 2011, the bankers commissioned Blumberg to build a monument to be placed near Ground Zero, coinciding with the Veterans Day parade on November 11. They paid him $500,000 for the work. The Gary Sinise Foundation and the Green Beret Foundation supported the effort to build the monument. No public funds were used.

Blumberg lives in DeMossville, Kentucky. However, much of the work on the bronze monument was done by the Crucible Foundry in Norman, Oklahoma, a full-service foundry specializing in monumental bronze. Blumberg spent many weeks on-site at the foundry to complete the work in time for the parade.

=== Description ===
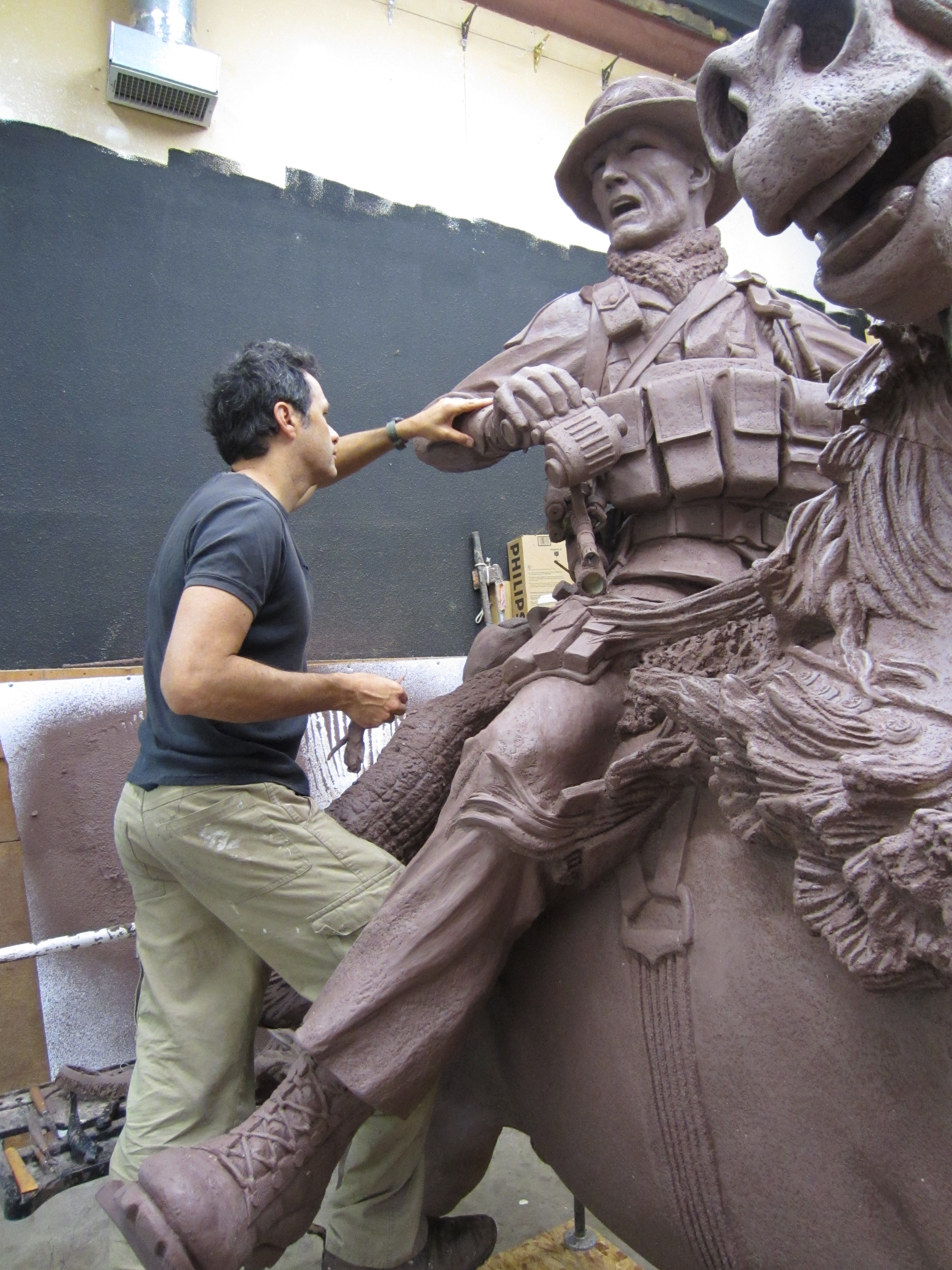
Blumberg puts the finishing touches on the full-size clay model of the horse soldier sculpture before the bronze work is begun.

On a life-and-a-half scale, the 5,000-pound (2,300 kg) bronze statue is 16 feet (4.9 m) tall, including a three-foot (0.91 m) tall granite plinth. The base bears the sculpture's title, "America's Response Monument." The statue is subtitled De Oppresso Liber, which is Latin for 'to liberate the oppressed', the motto of the US Army Special Forces.

It depicts a male Green Beret operator wearing a boonie hat on horseback leading the invasion into Afghanistan. His right hand is holding field glasses. An M4A1 carbine equipped with picatinny rails around the gun barrel with the upper receiver, an ACOG at the upper receiver, an AN/PEQ-2 laser sight at the right side of the barrel, a 30 round STANAG magazine, an attached M203 grenade launcher under the barrel, and attached to a sling is slung under his right shoulder. An outline of a wedding band is visible under the glove of the soldier's left hand. Blumberg said, "That's my way of tipping my hat to wives, marriages, and the strain on families. It's to acknowledge the stresses caused by multiple deployments." Blumberg created the sculpture's face without using a model or photos. It does not represent the face of a specific individual.

The small, Afghan "Lokai" horse shows "Tersk" breeding, indicating a horse of Eastern European heritage descended from horses brought in by the Soviets in the 1980s. In the Afghan culture, the soldiers only ride stallions into battle. The horses could be difficult to control, and the statue depicts the horse rearing back. The horse tack depicted by Blumberg is traditional to the Afghani people. A tasseled breast collar helps keep the flies off the chest and legs. The statue's base reflects the steep, precipitous slopes that the soldiers often traveled on horseback.

=== World Trade Center steel ===
During the battle against the Taliban, each Green Beret ODA team carried a piece of steel recovered from the rubble of the World Trade Center in honor of the 9/11 victims. Later in the war, they each buried their piece of steel at a significant point in the battle. Bowers chose Mazar-i-Sharif as the location to bury his piece of the World Trade Center. This was the location of one of their toughest battles and where CIA officer Mike Spann became the first American killed in action in Afghanistan.

Like the soldiers it honors, the statue carries a piece of steel from the World Trade Center. It is visible under the plinth, embedded in the base. The monument's inscription states that the steel "symbolizes the connection between the events of 9/11 and the actions of the special operations heroes this monument honors."

== Dedication ==
The statue was introduced to the public during the Veteran's Day Parade in New York City on November 11, 2011. The statue was displayed on a float, which led the parade along Fifth Avenue from 23rd Street north to 56th Street. It was dedicated the same day in a ceremony led by Vice President Joe Biden and Lt. Gen. John Mulholland, commander of Special Operations Command and formerly commander of Task Force Dagger during the initial days of the War in Afghanistan. New York City ironworkers who had helped build the World Trade Center were among those who helped transport, move, and install the statue temporarily in the West Street Lobby inside One World Financial Center in New York City opposite Ground Zero.

It is the first publicly accessible monument to the United States special forces. The Special Warfare Memorial Statue, commemorating the actions of Green Beret forces in the Vietnam War, was placed on Meadows Memorial Field at Fort Bragg, North Carolina, on November 19, 1969, but all visitors must pass through base security. The land at One World Trade Center for the monument was donated by a private Wall Street firm.

=== Rededication at One World Trade Center ===
The statue was rededicated on October 19, 2012, by General John Mulholland. He dedicated the statue in its new location in front of One World Trade Center, across from Ground Zero and the 9/11 Memorial. The bronze statue was positioned so the soldier atop the horse is keeping a watchful eye over the World Trade Center and its tenants. Soldiers representing the United States Army Special Operations Command attended the ceremony. At its rededication, the statue's entire cost of over $750,000 had been paid by hundreds of private citizens.

=== Moved to Liberty Park ===
On September 11, 2016, the statue was rededicated once again at a permanent site on an elevated space on the south side of Ground Zero in Liberty Park, a 1 acre (0.40 ha) park in Lower Manhattan. The park was built on top of the World Trade Center's Vehicular Security Center and overlooks the National September 11 Memorial & Museum.

== In popular culture ==
In 2009, Disney bought the movie rights to Doug Stanton's book Horse Soldiers, and Jerry Bruckheimer began seeking financing in December 2011. The 2018 war drama film 12 Strong, directed by Nicolai Fuglsig and written by Ted Tally and Peter Craig, was released on January 19, 2018. The statue makes a brief appearance in the final scene of the film, just before the credits roll.
