= Douwe Blumberg =

American sculptor

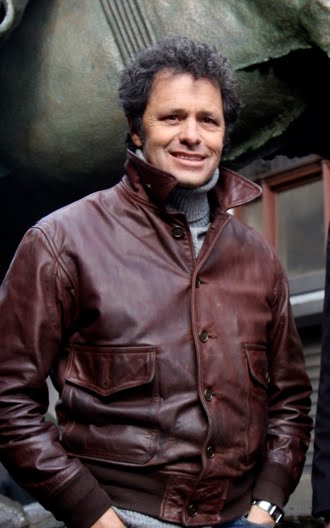
- Born: January 30, 1965 (age 61); Los Angeles, California, U.S.
- Education: University of Southern California, Idyllwild School of Music and the Arts
- Known for: Sculpture
- Notable work: America's Response Monument, Flight 5191 Memorial
- Spouse: Marci Blumberg
- Awards: ADEX design award; Leonard J. Meiselman Sculpture award
- Website: Douwe Studios

Douwe Blumberg (pronounced "Dow", born January 30, 1965) is a bronze sculptor who is most well known for his statue of a special forces soldier on horseback commemorating Special Forces operations in Afghanistan during the opening days of Operation Enduring Freedom. He has received more than 200 commissions and a number of awards since becoming a sculptor in 2000. He attended the University of Southern California and studied at the Idyllwild School of Music and the Arts. He was a horse trainer for 18 years before he became a sculptor.

== Personal life ==
Blumberg was born in Los Angeles, California. His grandparents hid a Jewish family in their home in Arnhem, Netherlands, during the Nazi occupation. When the Germans discovered their hiding place, Blumberg's grandfather was sent to Dachau, where he was murdered. His father and his brothers served in World War II. His family's experiences were the foundation of a history in military history. Both of his parents were talented amateur artists. They raised their children in a home without television and focused on history, education, and formal and informal art education. At Beverly Hills High School, he took metal shop taught by a former machinist's mate where he learned to weld, cast, make molds. He grew up riding horses and became an assistant trainer at age 15.

His family hired woodcarver James Conrad Dallas as a private tutor, which turned into a 35 year long relationship. Blumberg spent several years in Europe as a youth where he learned about Western artistic traditions.

He studied four years of sculpture, metal working, and jewelry while studying at Idyllwild School of Music and the Arts, attending the University of Southern California at the same time. He then became an apprentice at an art foundry where he learned how to cast bronze sculptures. After graduating from college, he bought a stable in Los Angeles and became a professional horse trainer. When he decided to become a sculptor full time, he moved to Northern Kentucky in 2001 where he has a studio. He is married to Marci Blumberg and between them they have four daughters.

== Professional career ==
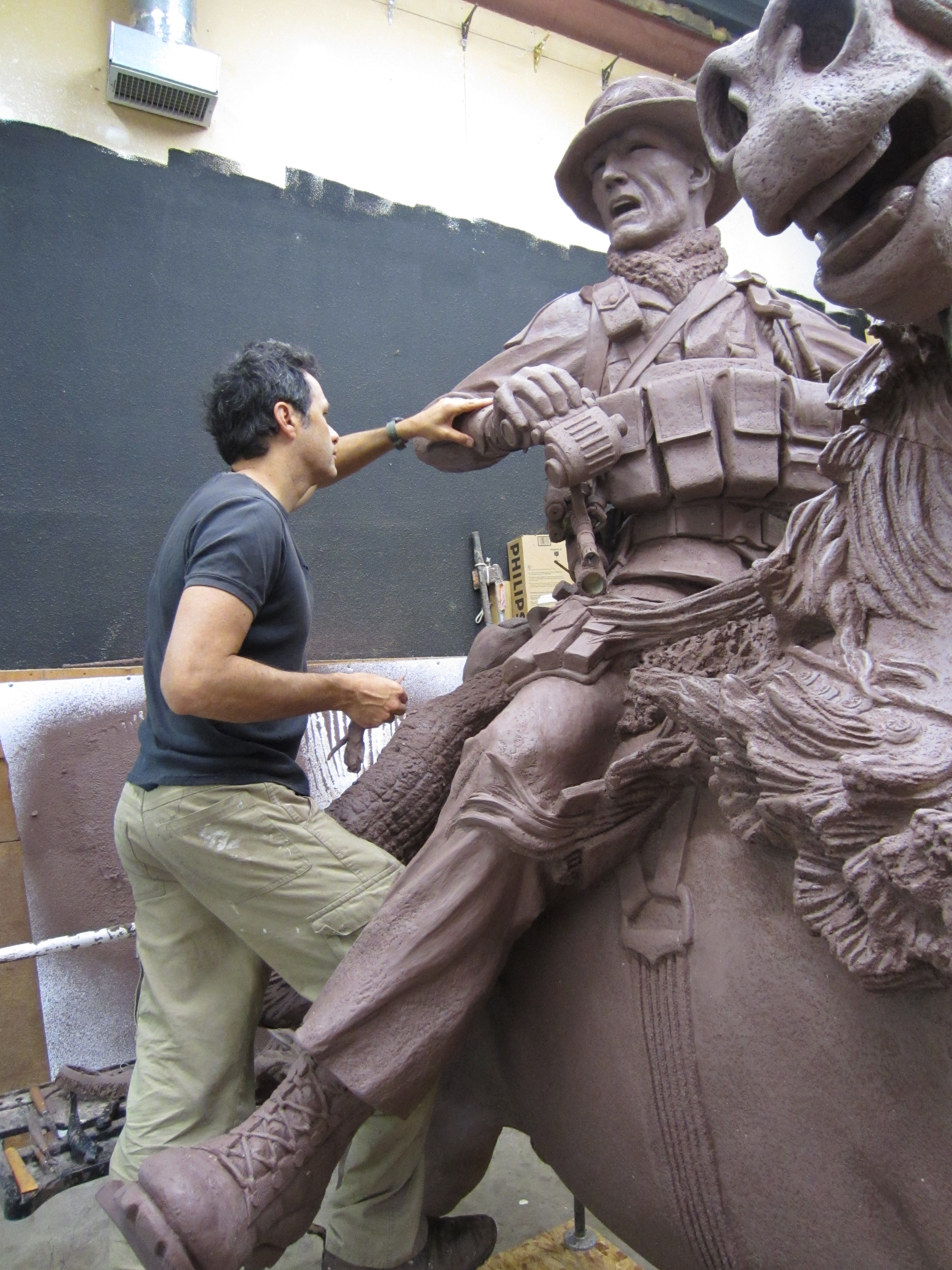
Blumberg puts the finishing touches on the clay model of the Horse Soldier Sculpture before the bronze work is begun.

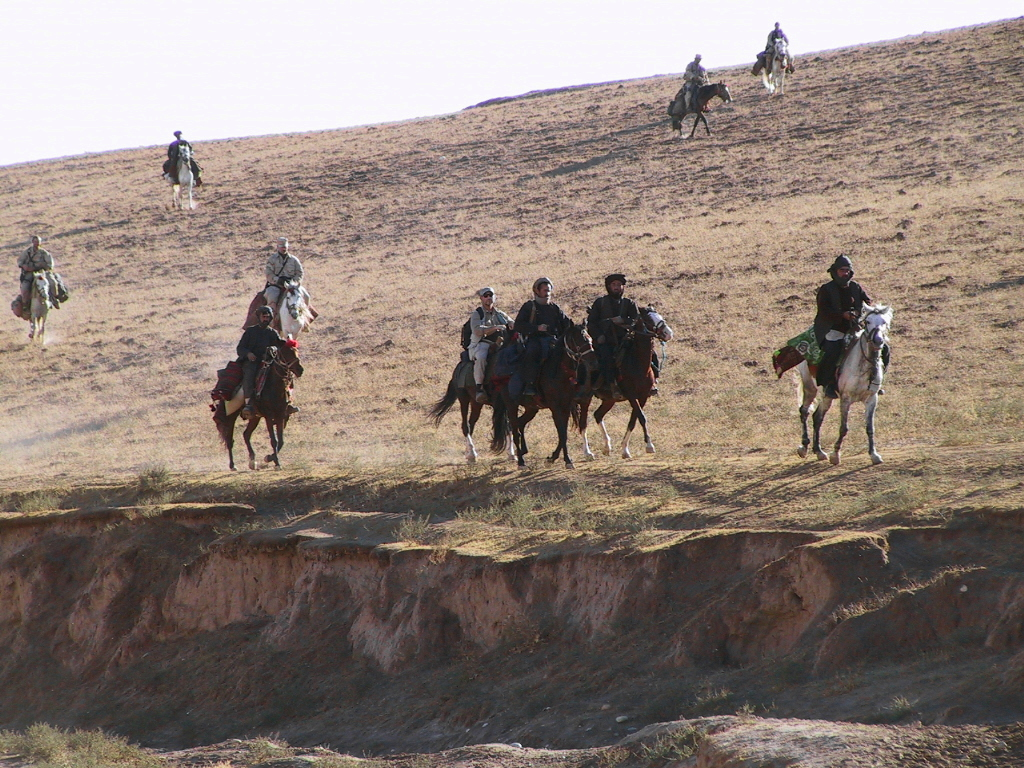
Blumberg was inspired by photos of Task Force Dagger on horseback in the Dari-a-Souf Valley, Afghanistan in October 2001.

Hailed as “America’s finest sculptor” by then-Vice President Joe Biden during his dedication speech for New York City’s “America’s Response Monument”, Blumberg did not originally envision an artistic career for himself. For thirteen years after graduation, he pursued a career as a professional horse-trainer at his ranch in Los Angeles. After finishing his education he became a professional horse trainer. He purchased a barn outside Los Angeles and built up a successful business training show horses and started a family. After several years he slowly began to sculpt again part-time. He began accepting commissions and after 18 years training horses, on one weekend he collected a check for $600 for horse training and another check for $6000 for a sculpture. At that point he decided to pursue sculpting. He closed his barn in 2000 and pursued sculpture work full-time.

His background and interest in horses and a personal interest in military history gave him a unique expertise. In late 2001, he was moved when saw a photo of the U.S. Special Operations forces horseback riding into battle in the early stages of Operation Enduring Freedom.

I was just blown away by the image of this 21st-century high-tech soldier on what could have been a 15th-century Afghan horse. It was iconic and ironic at the same time, on so many levels. First, the adaptability of these guys–they weren’t trained on horseback. They just climbed up and went–the first Americans to ride into combat on horses in over 50 years. So I see this picture and said, 'I have to do this.'

Blumberg decided to create a statue marking the singular event. Over nine months at his own expense he completed a 18 inches (460 mm) tall bronze sculpture of a Green Beret riding an Afghan horse. The idea gathered attention and support.

A group of Wall Street bankers who lost friends and co-workers in the 9/11 attacks funded the monumental bronze statue. America's Response Monument was dedicated on October 19, 2012, to the memory of the special forces by General John Mulholland, Deputy Commanding General of U.S. Army Special Forces Command. It was placed in front of One World Trade Center across from Ground Zero and 9/11 Memorial.

=== Commissions ===
In 2011, Blomberg was selected from among over 200 other artists and won the commission for the Nevada State Veterans Memorial. It includes 18 large bronze figures. He was chosen from among 49 other applicants to construct a memorial to the victims of the crash of Flight 5191 at Blue Grass Airport on August 27, 2006. He was selected by the Special Forces Association, the Foundation for U.S. Historical Monuments, and Special Operations Association to sculpt the new a life-and-a-half scale U.S. Army Special Forces Monument to be placed at Ft. Bragg, North Carolina and Washington D.C. Other commissions he has received include "The Birds of Valencia," a 17-foot tall flock of birds for the Intertex Companies in Los Angeles, which was placed at the Bridgeport Marketplace shopping center in Valencia, California.

He has received commissions to create a life-size herd of wild horses for the city of Aurora, Colorado, a large outdoor musical piece for the performing arts center in Lebanon, Kentucky, a new monument at the entrance to the Vance Brand Airport in Longmont, Colorado, a life-size monument for the Kentucky State Fair and Exposition Center, the New Jersey Fallen Soldiers Monument to be placed at Picatinny Arsenal, a large commission for the American Saddlebred Museum, and the Bahrainian embassy in D.C. Other monument commissions include: Reflections, William Shatner residence 2006; Way of Horse and Bow, William Shatner residence 2014; Safekeeping, Royal residence in Dubai, UAE 2005; Ode to Joy, San Francisco 2013; Ascension, Charleston 2015.

=== Recognition ===
Blumberg has completed more than 200 private and public commissions and received a number of awards since he opened his studio full-time in 2000. He was recognized with the 2002 Leonard J. Meiselman award in Sculpture from the American Academy of Equine Artists, the 2003 Loveland sculpture invitational, the 2003 ADEX design award.

In 2003 he received a commission from William Shatner for a statue that became the "Way of Horse and Bow", featuring a Samurai warrior on horseback. The original is displayed in front of Shatner's personal residence along with two other works by Blomberg. Shatner donated a second, 200-pound bronze replica of the "Way of Horse and Bow" to the Frazier History Museum in Louisville, Kentucky. Blomberg was also commissioned to create a life-size monument for the United Professional Horseman's Association. A smaller version of America’s Response Monument was put on display at the John F. Kennedy Special Warfare Museum.
