= Horses in Kyrgyzstan =

Equines in Central Asia

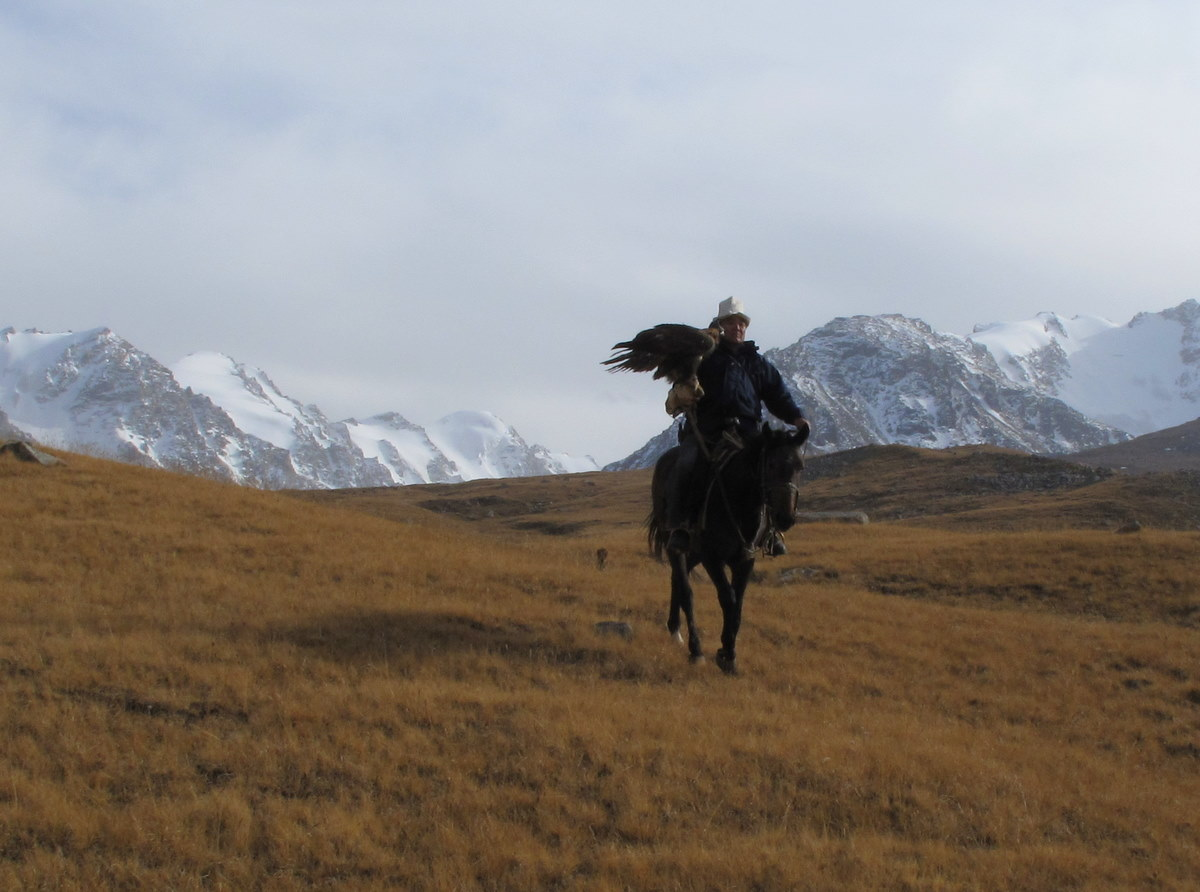
Kyrgyz horse rider hunting with an eagle

In Kyrgyzstan, as in all countries with a Turko-Mongol nomadic culture, horses are an important part of the local economy and identity. Originally a status symbol, the possession of numerous horses enables Kyrgyz nomads to carry out military operations, hunt and move around their mountainous country. Ownership of large herds was banned during the Soviet era, causing many difficulties for the Kyrgyz. The Russians tried to replace the traditional breed with a crossbred horse, the NovoKyrgyz, but the local horse has survived to the present day. After a period of crisis in the 1990s, horse breeding and the consumption of mare milk are enjoying a revival, as are traditional equestrian games and festivals.

Kyrgyzstan is home to six breeds of horse, including the heritage breed that symbolizes the country, the Kyrgyz horse. The horse is celebrated in literature and oral traditions as a double of the human being. They are commonly sacrificed at ritual festivals, which have been revived since the end of communism.

== History ==
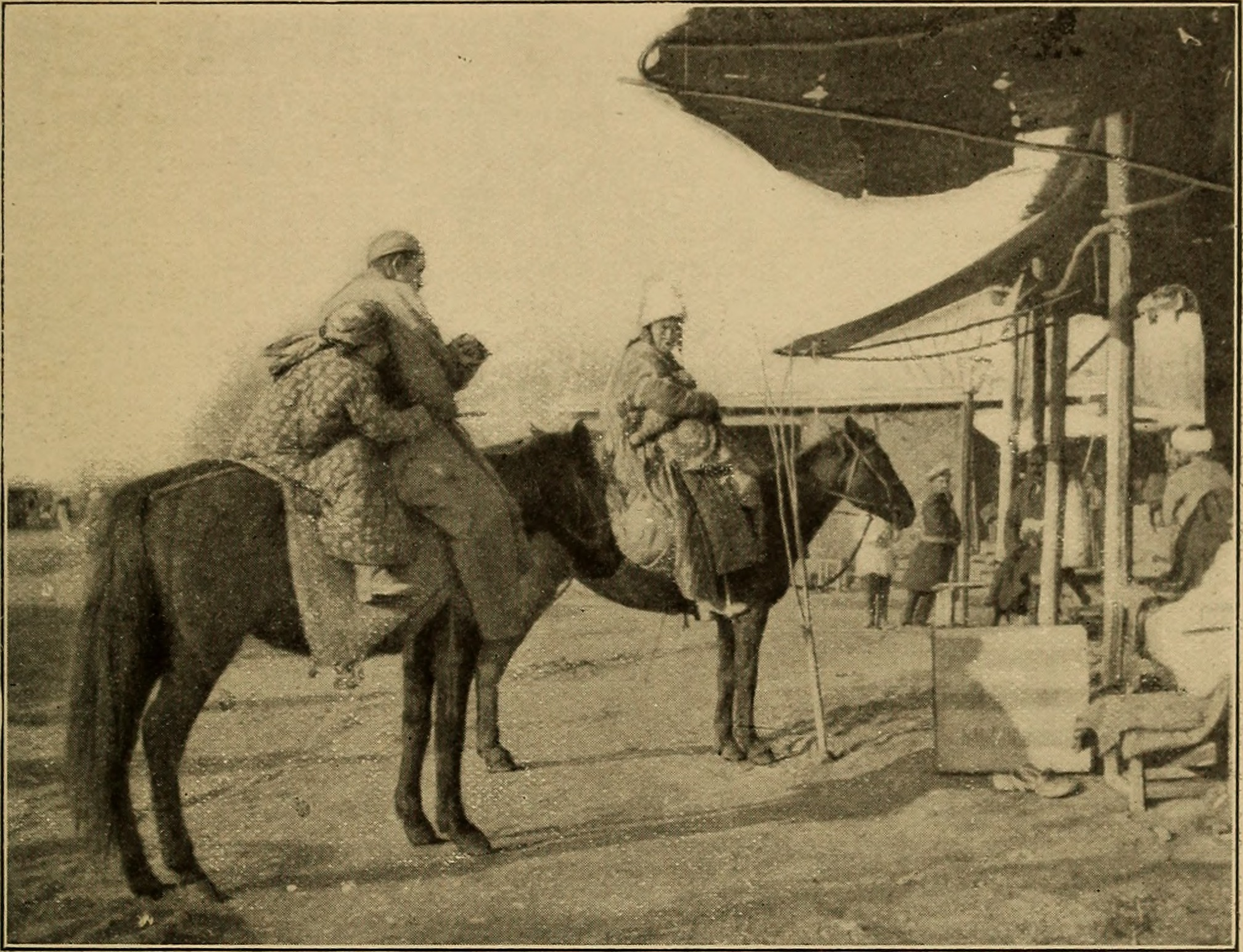
Kyrgyz family buying food in Osh, 1902.

Kyrgyzstan has long been crossed by horse riders, as the country lies on the Silk Road. Before the Soviet era, the number of horses owned determined a Kyrgyz's social status. Horses were used by these nomadic people for travel, and also for agricultural work by means of a travois. The arrival of wheeled horse-drawn vehicles in Kyrgyzstan came very late, only in the second half of the 19th century. Until the end of that century, all Kyrgyz military operations were carried out on horseback. The country's entire economy is based on animal husbandry: horses and sheep are used as currency in all fields. Children are taught to ride from an early age. Riding skills are therefore highly respected.

=== Communist period ===
==== Collectivization and sedentism ====
Like other countries integrated into the Soviet Union, Kyrgyzstan saw its equestrian traditions decline with the creation of kolkhoz and sovkhoz, due in part to the importation of motor vehicles. The Kyrgyz resisted sedentism for quite some time, most of them preferring to remain nomads. This led to violent clashes between nomadic herders and communist supporters, some of whom preferred to slaughter their entire herds before fleeing the country, rather than donate them to the community. The seizure of these herds, which included other domestic animals as well as horses, led to the first collectivized state farms in Kyrgyzstan. From 1931 onwards, the Kyrgyz became increasingly sedentary, particularly among the poorer sections of the population. The collective farms provided horses to guard and look after the herds. While nomadic herders could own herds of up to 80 horses, the number of animals they are allowed to keep for their own use is strictly limited. In the 1970s, in the Tong district of Issyk-Kul, people were allowed to have only one mare and one foal, with any additional animals confiscated for the community. However, breeders frequently conceal horses from the authorities.

==== Creation of the Novokirghiz ====
When the Russians conquered Central Asia, they deplored the small size of Kazakh and Kyrgyz horses, and failed to consider the possibility that these small, ugly animals might be best suited to their environment. A stud farm was set up in Prževalsk (Karakol) in 1907, and became a public institution in 1912. Kyrgyz horses were crossed with draft horses and trotters. The socialist regime created two other stud farms in Issyk Kul and Naryn, in 1926 and 1927 respectively. Many horses were imported: 17% of the equine livestock in Kyrgyz kolkhoz and sovkhoz was of foreign or mixed origin in 1949. The creation of a new breed, named NovoKirghiz (Russian for "new Kyrgyz"), became official in 1954, with the creation of the studbook. Crossbreeding was mainly with Thoroughbreds and Russian Don horses. The success was considerable: by 1979, 53% of Kyrgyzstan's equine livestock was of the NovoKirghiz breed, the Kyrgyz horse having disappeared from official statistics.

=== Anecdote ===
In early 2016, a British citizen working for a gold mine was arrested for referring to a traditional Kyrgyz sausage as a "horse penis".

==== Rebuilding horse breeding ====
After the dissolution of the USSR, some Kyrgyz breeders managed to rebuild large herds of horses, numbering around forty head. Paradoxically, the early 1990s saw a sharp drop in the number of horses, due to the large popular festivals that became possible again after the end of communism, and for which many horses were slaughtered and eaten. The breeding crisis that accompanied the gradual dismantling of Soviet institutions led to a devaluation of the breeding profession, although the horse retained its prestigious status. Horse-drawn vehicles were widely used in the 1990s, as the crisis led to fuel shortages. The situation only began to improve in the 2000s.

From 2003 to 2010, the Kyrgyz government adopted measures to promote horse breeding. Approved by a government decree on 22 May 2003, the aim of this program is to increase the quality and quantity of the herd, in order to obtain enough horses for the various outlets (meat, milk, work and sport). The development of ecotourism on horseback since the 2000s is also noteworthy.

==== Adding value to the Kyrgyz horse ====
At the same time, a number of private individuals are attempting to reconstitute herds of pre-Soviet Kyrgyz horses, by collecting animals from remote regions. When Jean-Louis Gouraud visited the country's main stud farms in 1992, he noted the near-disappearance of the Kyrgyz horse and informed a minister. He wrote a long letter, preserved by the country's government, calling for the protection and safeguarding of this "heritage of humanity". The Minister of Agriculture at the time, Karipbek Arcanov, promised him the "regeneration of the Kyrgyz horse". According to Gouraud, however, it wasn't until the investment of another Frenchwoman, Jacqueline Ripart, in the 2000s, that real initiatives were launched to promote this heritage breed. She set up the Kyrgyz Aty project, with the aim of safeguarding and developing the Kyrgyz horse, as well as promoting the breed among rural inhabitants to make them aware of the animal's usefulness in their mountain biotope. With the support of its contacts in the country, several horse-related festivals have been organized since 2005, notably on the south bank of the Issyk Kul. These festivals include races, equestrian games and concerts. Carole Ferret has also observed a "re-nationalization" of the NovoKyrgyz breed, with some specialists in the country believing that "the genes of the Kyrgyz horse are so strong" that they dominate in mixed-breed horses, which is obviously contrary to the laws of zootechnics.

== Breeding ==
In 1948, the horse density in Kyrgyzstan was 41 per 100 inhabitants, i.e. almost one horse for every two people. However, the 2005 census shows that horse breeding is about half the size of cattle breeding.

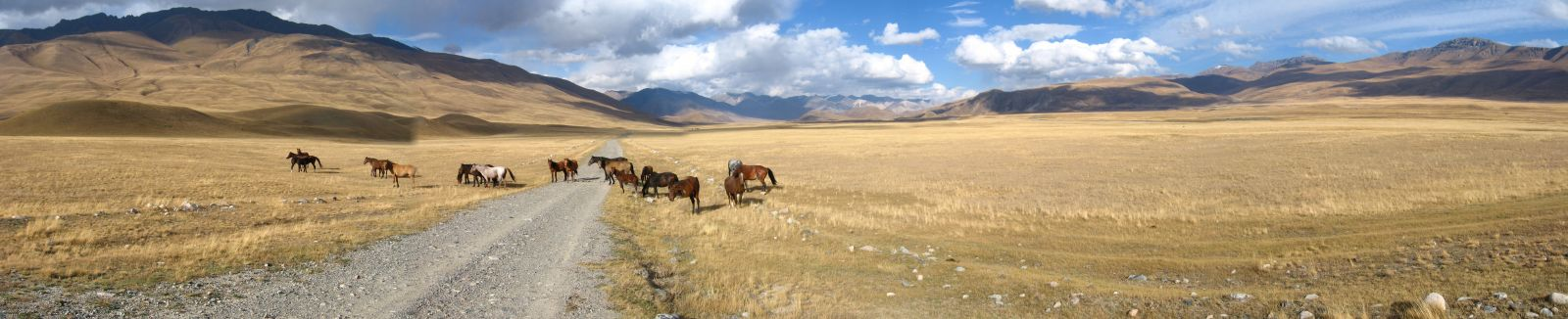
Traditional horse habitat in Kyrgyzstan.

Horses are bred for transport, meat, milk, skin and hair. They are also used extensively for hunting and herding, whether cattle, sheep or horses. The number of horses has increased steadily since the 2000s:

Year	1996	2002	2006
Number of horses registered in the Kyrgyz Republic	308 100	354 400	384 000

At the end of the 2000s, the price of an adult horse was relatively high, between $1 000 and $1 500. The quality of Kyrgyz breeding is renowned, with buyers making the trip from neighboring Kazakhstan.

=== Breeds ===
The Food and Agriculture Organization (FAO) notes the presence of six different breeds bred currently or in the past in this country: the Russian Don horse, the Kyrgyz, the NovoKirghiz, the Oryol, the Russian Trotter and the Thoroughbred. The Ajkol stud farm, in the Tonskij district of the Issyk-Kul Region, is seeking to develop "improved" Kyrgyz horses by crossing with Thoroughbreds for participation in horse racing, and with the aim of developing equestrian sport and games.

=== Breeding and usage ===
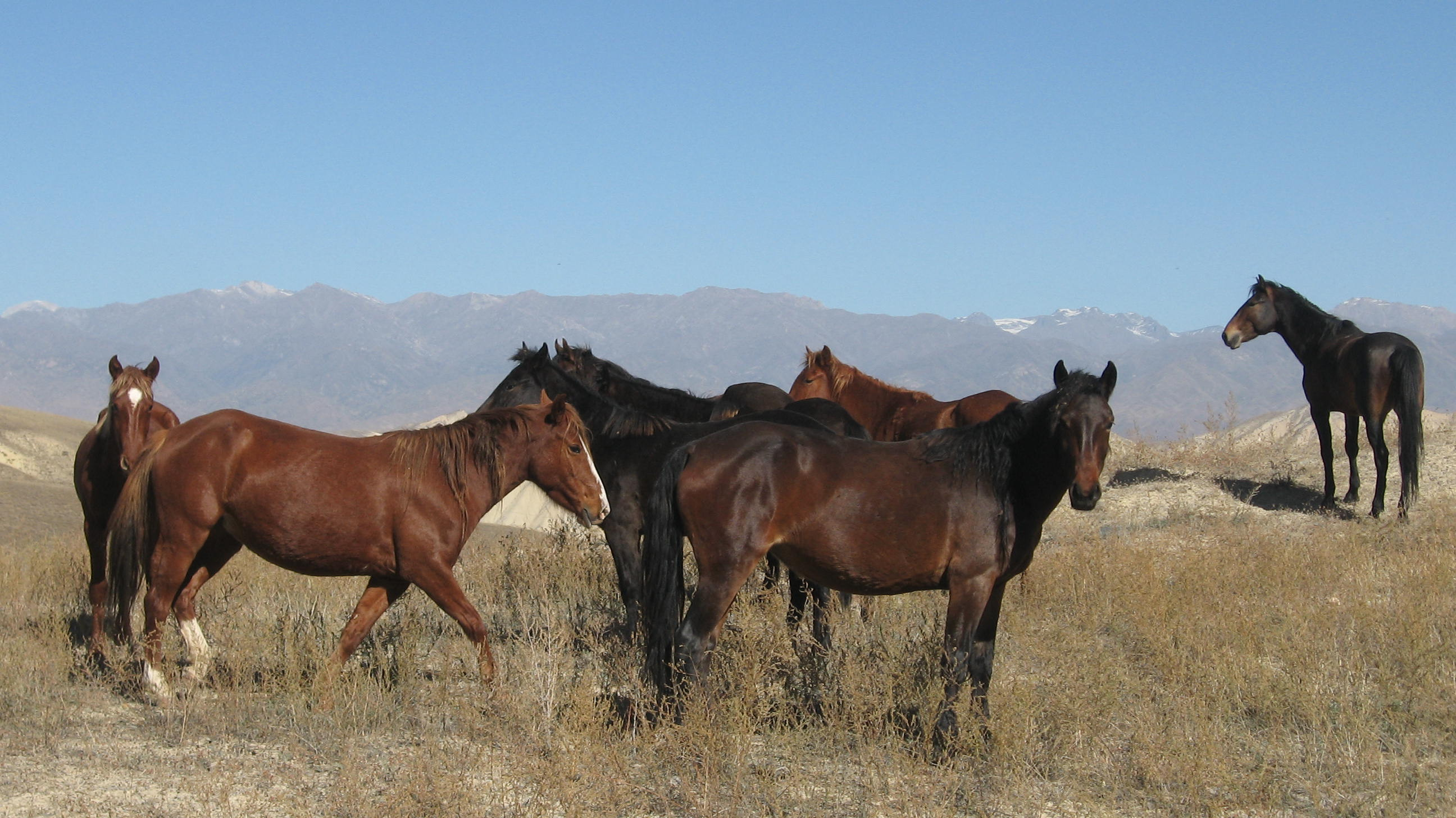
A group of Kyrgyz horses bred for meat.

Breeding is essentially extensive. Horse management has improved overall, but still varies greatly from one farm to another, depending on the animal's purpose. A racehorse is generally well cared for because of its financial value. A stock horse, on the other hand, has little value. According to Amantur Žaparov, these animals are generally well cared for. Anyone who hits their horse on the head or works it to exhaustion is frowned upon. Traditional remedies are still used, but the Kyrgyz have adopted vaccinations and veterinary medicine, which they discovered during the Communist era.

During the hot season, working animals are shackled or tied to a stake outside when not in use, to prevent them from straying too far. Once a horse has been put through its paces, it is always tethered, and usually covered with a rug to prevent it getting cold. The horse is tethered for a few hours to rest, then released.

During their free grazing, the mares (usually 10 to 15) are herded with a single stallion, and tethered five to six times a day for milking. At night, the whole herd is released. They have to be fetched on horseback and rounded up in the morning for the first milking, which is generally carried out by the women and children. Herds that are not milked are generally much larger, and are kept in total freedom in the summer, with farmers checking for wolf attacks and theft every other day. Horse theft is a major cultural problem in Kyrgyzstan. As herds can travel quite far, herders help each other to spot animals belonging to local people. During the cold season, depending on the intensity of the weather, horses are kept in open pasture or brought in and fed hay, or cereals for those who work hardest.

== Riding practices ==
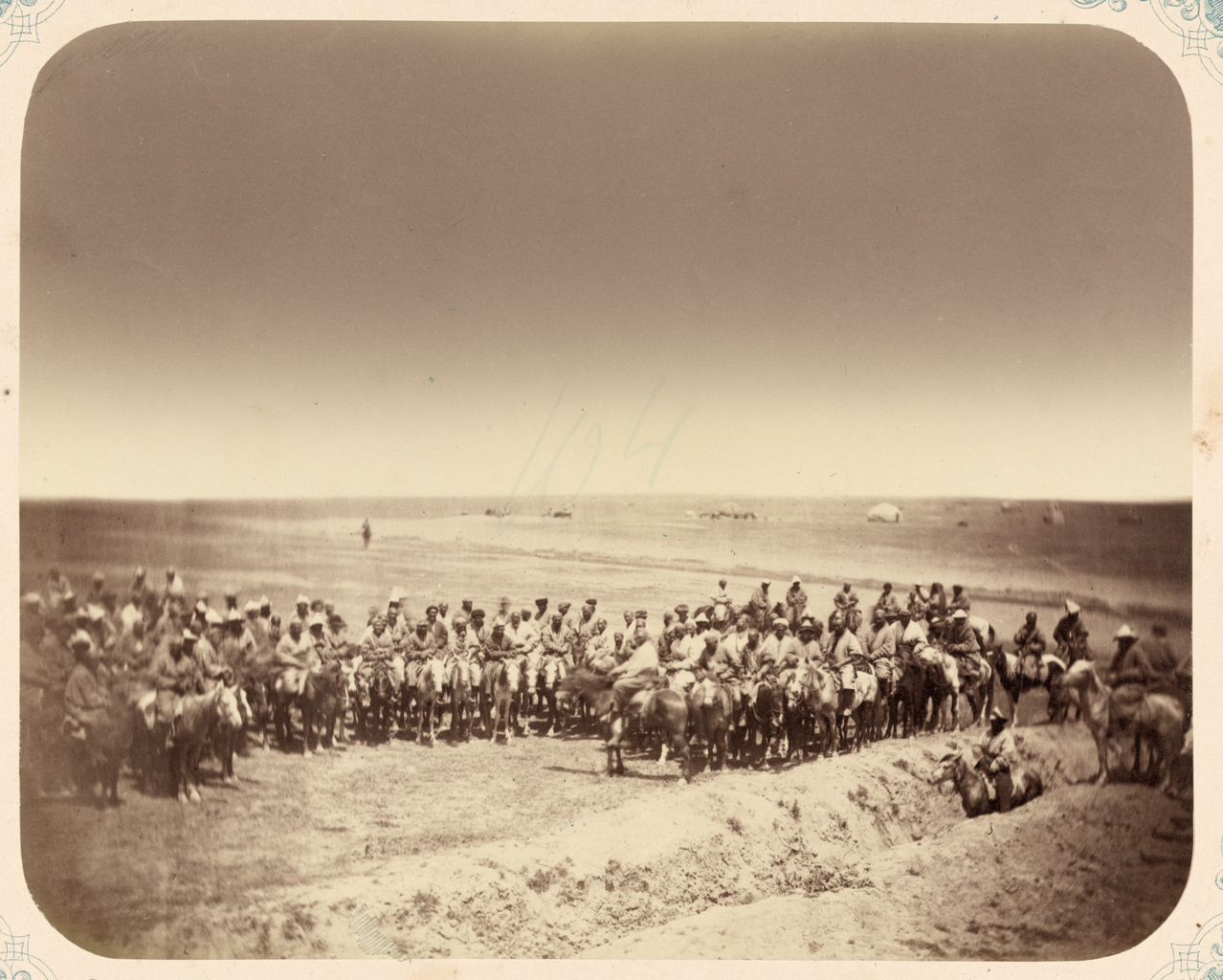
Game of Kok-Boru (Buzkashi), between 1865 and 1872.

Equestrian activities in Kyrgyzstan are essentially racing, games and entertainment. The ulak tartyš or kok-boru (local names for Buzkashi game) was maintained during the communist period and is enjoying a revival. Kyz kuu, locally known as Kyz kumaï, is also a popular (and romantic) equestrian game, in which a male and female horse riders compete over a distance of 300 m, the stakes being for the man the right to steal a kiss from the woman, who can then pursue him by lashing out. Horse wrestling, Er Enish or Oodarysh, is one of the disciplines of the World Nomad Games. It is considered a national Kyrgyz sport, having been practiced for centuries in nomadic camps. The aim is for each rider to throw their opponent to the ground. Tiyin ainmey is a competition of skill: a coin (now replaced by a cloth pennant in the modern form) is placed on the ground, and riders must bend down to pick it up as quickly as possible.

Eagle hunting is still practised by nomadic horse male riders in Kyrgyzstan, particularly the Berkutchi, and is a feature of traditional salburun events. Local hunters regard the falcon as a pastime for children, and only use the golden eagle. The hunting season takes place during the four winter months, when it is customary for the hunter to kill dozens of foxes and badgers, and even lynx and wolves.

Traditional Kyrgyz equestrian harness and implements include the kamtcha (whip or riding crop), bridle and spurs of various shapes and sizes, which are not recommended for beginners. Horses are often covered with an embroidered caparison and blanket. The saddle is considered a very precious item, as it is often expensive to buy.

=== Jamby atysh ===
During the second half of the first millennium, the Kyrgyz, like other peoples of southern Siberia, sought to develop shooting techniques, both on foot and on horseback. The Kyrgyz horse rider's main weapon was his bow, although light sabers could be used in close combat. The basic Kyrgyz tactic was to harass the enemy with their mounted archers, avoiding close contact; their equestrian skill was unsurpassed.

This equestrian skill of the mounted archer was perpetuated by the jamby atysh (Kyrgyz: Жамбы атыш), a sporting competition in which riders and archers on foot must hit a silver disc suspended from a rope with their arrow. Horse riders must gallop a distance of 300 m; over the last 100 meters, horse hoof-sized targets (called jamba) are suspended from posts 3 to 4 m high. Riders pass at a distance of 35 to 45 m from the targets and must try to hit them while remaining at full gallop.

Today, the rules have been codified; jamby atysh schools train riders in Central Asia, and championships are organized. Atysh jamby can also be practised with other weapons, such as spears.

=== Baïge ===
Long-distance horse racing, known as baigue (or bäjge), has been growing in popularity since the 1990s. Those organized as part of the At čabyš festivals set up under the impetus of Jacqueline Ripart, are relatively influenced in their rules by Western endurance races: only adult riders are allowed to take part, veterinary checks are provided for and prizes awarded for horses in the best physical condition, to avoid the death of mounts during the competitions. The death of a horse is unacceptable from a Western point of view, whereas it is tolerated in Central Asia.

=== Equestrian tourism ===
Since 2007-2010, Kyrgyzstan has opened up to equestrian tourism, a practice that enables herding families to earn additional income from their livestock. Breeders rent horses to foreign tourists to enable them to ride. The development of this practice has led to an improvement in the welfare of the horses, as the Kyrgyz who rent out equidae strive to provide them with good care and proper harnessing. A number of tour operators offer treks with guides who know the region well, and donate the profits generated to the local population.

Kyrgyzstan has a major advantage when it comes to ecotourism: its mountainous landscapes. Tours offer horseback riding in the wilderness and overnight stays in yurts, but some tourists are disappointed by the lack of authenticity of nomadism and the Kyrgyz people's lack of respect for the environment.

== Consumption ==
Like other horse cultures, the Kyrgyz are characterized by their consumption of horsemeat and products made from it.

=== Horse meat ===
Horsemeat is considered prestigious, and the consumption of a foal is typical of people with high social status. Traditionally, horses are massively slaughtered as soon as the cold weather sets in, to build up reserves for the winter. Hypophagy has traditionally been more widespread in the north of the country than in the south, where the influence of Islam, which discourages horse-eating, is more strongly felt. Although the consumption of horses is on the increase overall (including in the south near Kara-Suu and Aravan, notably as part of festivals), it remains a secondary purpose for the animal.

=== Mare milk ===
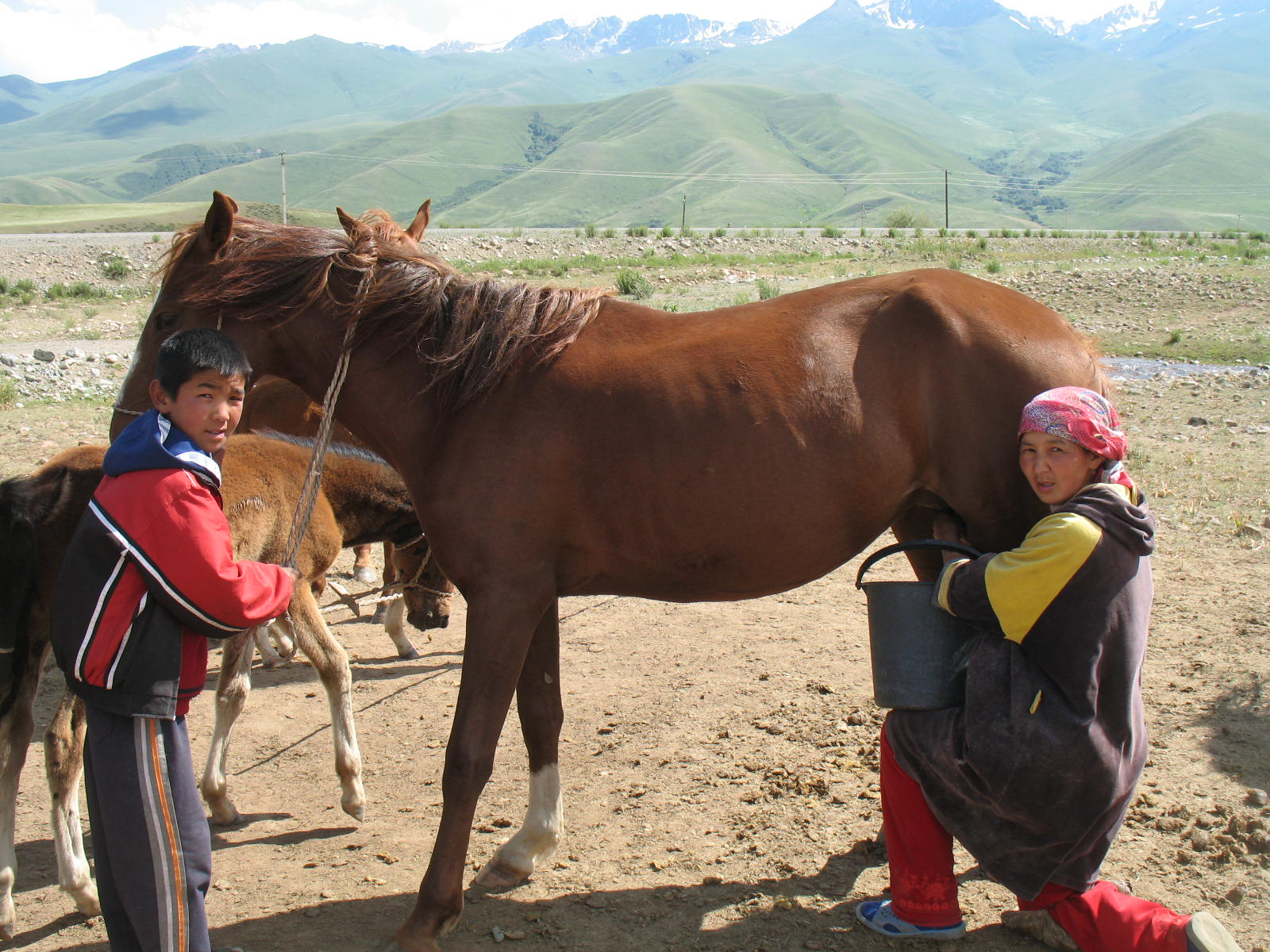
Milking a mare in Suusamyr valley.

As in most Turko-Mongol countries, mare milk is traditionally consumed in Kyrgyzstan. Its popularity has risen sharply since the end of communism. The Kyrgyz consume this milk either fresh (bèènin sütü) or fermented (kumis or saamal), but there is a popular belief that it should be swallowed while still hot, just after milking, to retain all its properties. The popularity of mare milk has led to an increase in its selling price, now (in 2011) around 50 soms a liter, or the equivalent of three euros. In the past, trading in mare milk was not an accepted practice, as breeders felt it "didn't sell". These reservations have now been overcome, and it is now possible to buy mare milk in shops, as local companies have specialized in collecting and packaging this product. These companies obtain their supplies directly from transhumant breeders.

== In culture ==
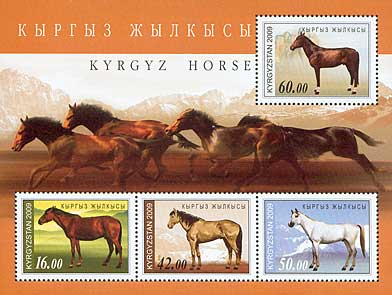
Stamp booklet celebrating Kyrgyz horses, 2009.

The nomadic culture of Kyrgyzstan lends itself naturally to the use of horses, which is highly valued in epics, poems and explorers' tales. It is described as a double of the human being, and as a particularly romantic animal. The Epic of Manas, for example, states that for a warrior to give up their horse is the worst humiliation and a death sentence. Kyrgyz epics and folklore abound with tales of horses transmitting "invincible strength" to its master, as in the case of Tchal-Kouyrouk.

Kyrgyz proverbs also place great importance on the animal. Some people say that "with your father you know the people, with your horse you know the territory", another that horses are man's wings. In his travel notes (1960), Víctor Itkovich quotes others: "If you only have a day to live, spend half of it in the saddle", and "Only a horse and pleasant conversation can shorten a long journey". In the case of matrimonial compensation (kalyn), it is common to give a horse to the in-laws, and customary to provide them with horsemeat and offal during the wedding ceremony. Horses are also used for rites of passage and parties, ancient traditions that have been revived since the end of communism. The Kyrgyz are very attached to their horses. If one of them dies, they often take it very hard.

The town of Karakol has the distinction of being the place where explorer Nikolay Przhevalsky, discoverer of the horse that bears his name, died in 1888. In his notes, he mentions that these wild horses are known to the Kyrgyz as kertag. It was also a Kyrgyz hunter who killed the first specimen studied in Dzungaria. Josef Schovanec refers to Kyrgyzstan in his chronicle as a kingdom defined by its horses, where they are never confined but live free and proud. What's more, in the epics, man can at best only benefit from the horses' help.

=== Sacrifices and burials ===
Like the Mongols, Turkish people practice horse sacrifice, but unlike the Mongols, this rite is best known from written sources among the Kyrgyz. The Yenisey are accustomed to burying the horse with its owner, the animal being reputed to guide its master into the afterlife. The aim is to keep the dead man and their possessions away from the living, so the horse is usually sacrificed or, more rarely, set free. Funeral rituals are always practiced in the context of a "return to the past", i.e. to pre-Soviet traditions (particularly from the late 19th century). The Kyrgyz practice veneration of the dead, blaming angry arbak (ancestral spirits) for most of the problems that can befall them. To appease them, it is customary to sacrifice one or more animals. Similarly, a forty-day rite must be observed after a death to appease the spirit of the deceased, including animal sacrifices and the reading of the Koran. In 1886, for the funeral ceremony accompanying the death of their manap Baytik, the Solto received 40,000 people and sacrificed almost 7,000 horses. In 1912, just before the Soviet era, the Northern Kyrgyz organized a feast for 50,000 people on the death of their manap Shabdan, slaughtering 2,000 horses in the process. These ceremonies are often accompanied by races. Although many different animals can be sacrificed and eaten (cattle and sheep, in particular), horsemeat is the obligatory ingredient of these funeral feasts (ash), the ceremony being recognized only if at least one horse has been slaughtered. It seems that, in the past, only the deceased's own animals were sacrificed. The ceremony has evolved, with each guest bringing one or more animals to be sacrificed. Stallions are forbidden to be sacrificed, for religious reasons and to maintain a sufficient breeding base for the renewal of generations. Young horses, as well as infertile or unfertilized mares, are generally slaughtered. The animal's throat is usually ritually slit, with invocations, the reading of the Koran by the Mullah and the utterance of the basmala ("in the name of Allah"). The meal that follows is carefully ritualized, with the horse's bones cut up and broken with an axe into several pieces, which are then served.

Testimonies gathered from the Sayaks of Jumgal Too and the Kyrgyz of Xinjiang give very precise details of these rituals. The horse's manes are cut off, and it is sometimes covered with a saddle on which all the other pieces of harness are piled. The animal is forbidden to ride, until it is sacrificed. Sometimes, it is not sacrificed, but given to the Mullah in exchange for the redemption of the deceased's sins. Afterwards, a symbolic transformation of horses into a vehicle for the afterlife takes place, but the details of this ritual are not known among the Kyrgyz. According to local beliefs, the spirit of the deceased has an influence on the outcome of these games.

=== Horses as a symbol of national identity ===
According to Carole Ferret, the Kyrgyz authorities, like the Russians, Yakuts and Turkmens, have used horse breeds as instruments of identity. The Russians have attempted to reappropriate the local Kyrgyz breed through the creation of the Novokirghiz: she sees in this process the desire to produce a "new horse for a new man". The existence of a national horse breed became a criterion for defining the human community of Kyrgyzstan, on a par with language and territory. Since then, the return to the original, smaller Kyrgyz horse has been widely encouraged. However, Kyrgyz practitioners and riders "don't care much about the breed or size of their horses". For the Kyrgyz government, recovering the national horse breed is an "expression of an allogeneic desire for authenticity".

== See also ==
- Culture of Kyrgyzstan
- Kyrgyz Horse
- Novokirghiz
- Kumis

== Bibliography ==
- Cassidy, Rebecca (2009). "The horse, the Kyrgyz horse and the "Kyrgyz horse". Anthropology Today. 25 (1): 12–15. doi:10.1111/j.1467-8322.2009.00641.x.
- Ferret, Carole (2009). Une civilisation du cheval : Les usages de l'équidé de la steppe à la taïga (in French). Paris: Belin. ISBN 978-2-7011-4819-9.
- Ferret, Carole (2011). "À chacun son cheval ! Identités nationales et races équines en ex-URSS (à partir des exemples turkmène, kirghize et iakoute)". Cahiers d'Asie centrale (in French) (19–20): 405–458.
- Gouraud, Jean-Louis (2005). "Prjevalski, c'est qui ? (et Taki c'est quoi ?". L'Asie centrale, centre du monde (du cheval) (in French). Belin. ISBN 2-7011-4185-0.
- Jacquesson, Svetlana (2007). Le cheval dans le rituel funéraire kïrgïz. Variations sur le thème du sacrifice (in French). Vol. 295. Journal asiatique. doi:10.2143/JA.295.2.2033243. ISSN 0021-762X.
- Levine, Emma (2000). A Game of Polo with a Headless Goat: In Search of the Ancient Sports of Asia. André Deutsch. ISBN 0233994165.
- Ripart, Jacqueline (2004). Terre des chevaux célestes: Kirghizistan (in French). Flammarion. ISBN 2082601501.
- Žaparov, Amantur (2010). "L'élevage du cheval au Kirghizstan" (PDF). Études mongoles et sibériennes, centrasiatiques et tibétaines (in French) (41). Translated by Ferret, Carole. doi:10.4000/emscat.1575.
