= Kyrgyz Horse =

Kyrgyz breed of horse

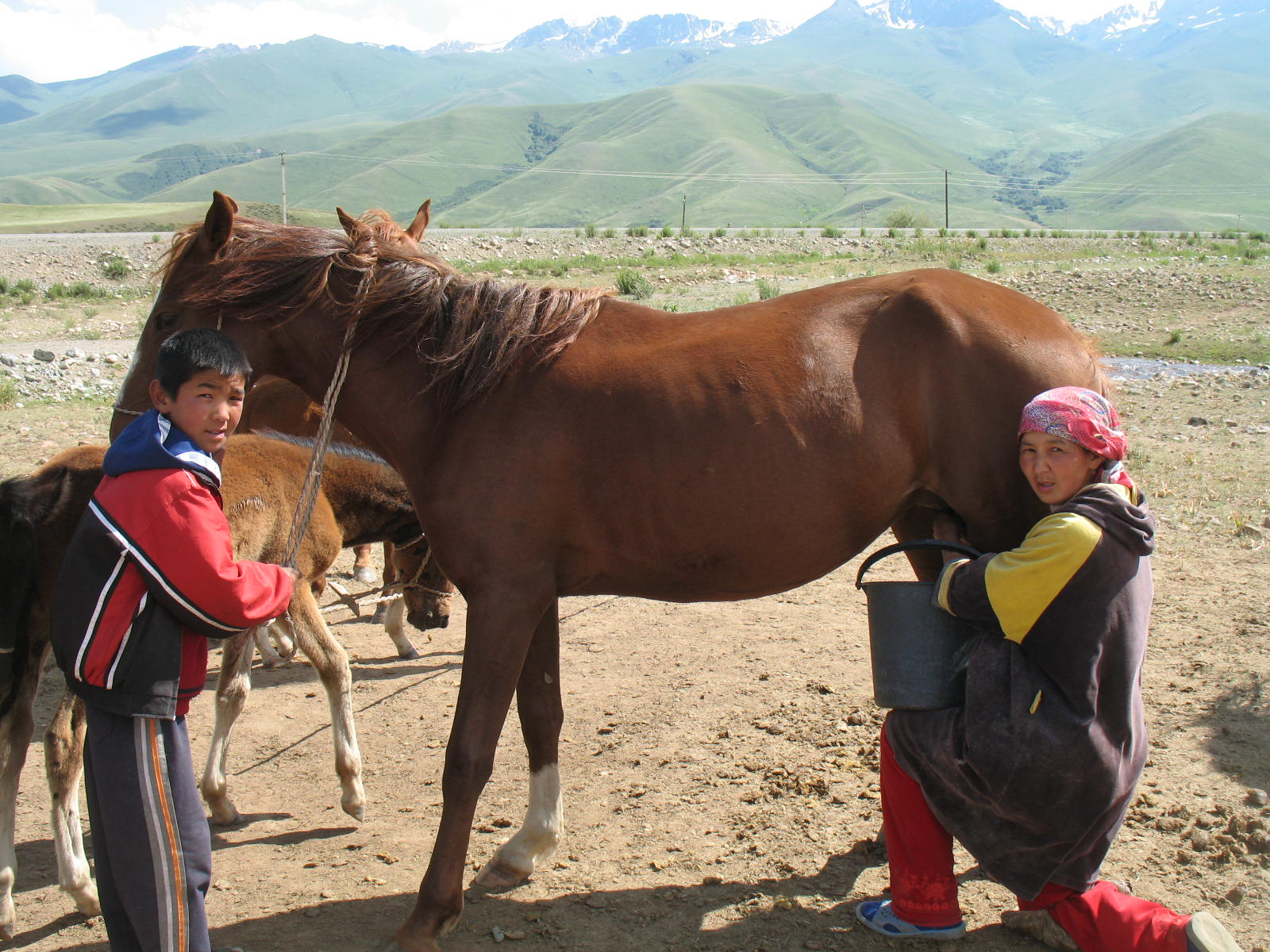
- A mare being milked in Suusamyr, Kyrgyzstan
- Conservation status: FAO (2007): not at risk
- Other names: Kirgiz; Kirgizskaya
- Country of origin: Kyrgyz Republic
- Standard: Fondation Kyrgyz Ate
- Use: riding horse; harness horse; meat; milk

Traits
- Height: 130–142 cm
- Colour: dark colours; grey

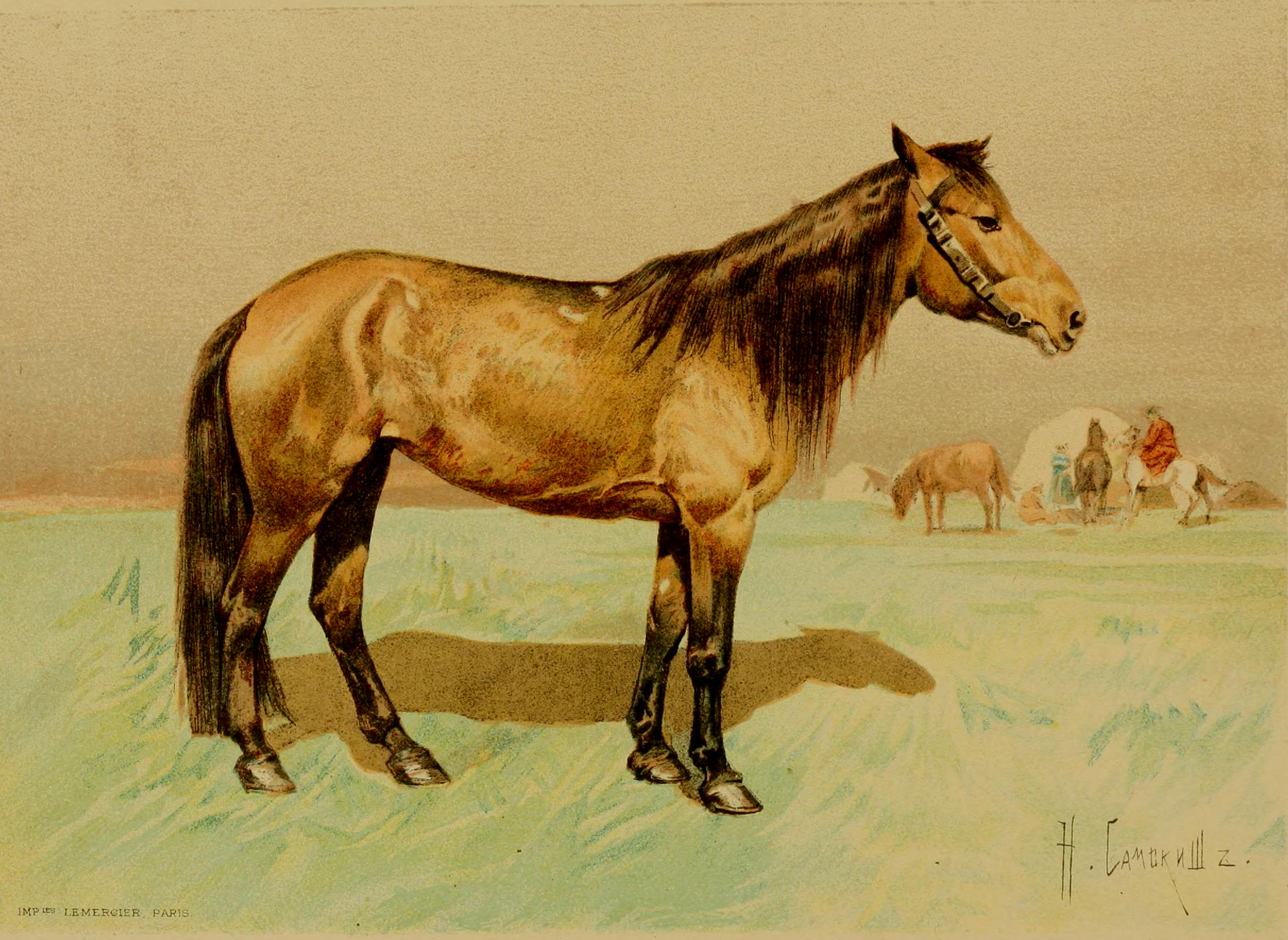
Kyrgyz Horse in 1894, illustration from Les races chevalines - avec une étude spéciale sur les chevaux russes

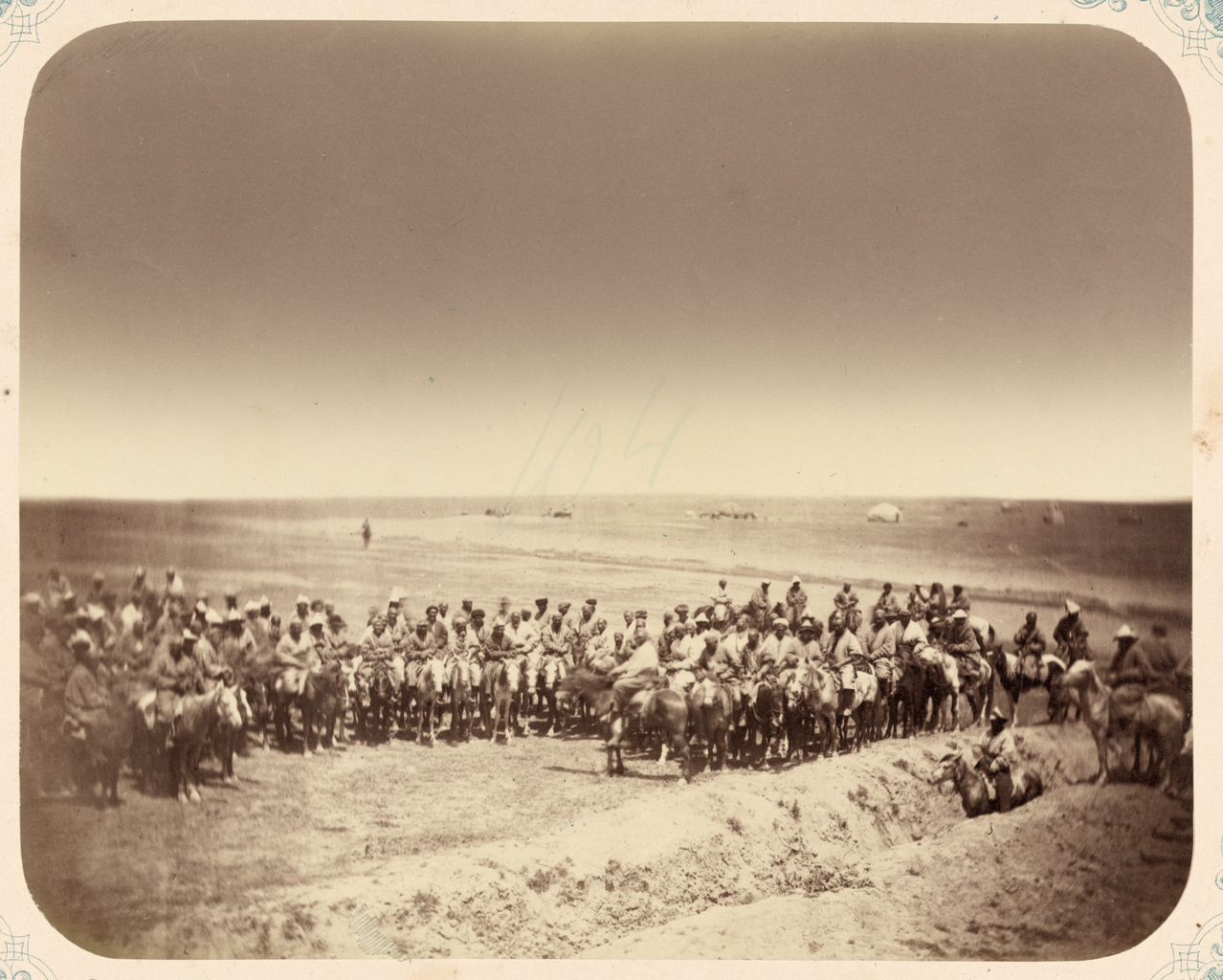
Kok-boru in Kyrgyzstan, circa 1872

The Kyrgyz Horse or Kirgiz Horse is a traditional breed of small horse from the Kyrgyz Republic (Kyrgyzstan). Kyrgyz people associate it with their nomadic past. During the Soviet era of Kyrgyz history, the Kyrgyz Horse was cross-bred with imported foreign breeds, including Don and Thoroughbred strains, to create a new and larger breed, the Novokirgiz or New Kirgiz. They are the only indigenous horse breeds of Kyrgyzstan.

== History ==
In the late nineteenth century there were some two million Kyrgyz horses in the area that is now Kyrgyzstan. During the Soviet era, the traditional Kyrgyz horse was cross-bred with larger but weaker imported foreign breeds, including Don and Thoroughbred strains, to create a new breed, the Novokirgiz or New Kirgiz. Numbers of the traditional native breed were greatly reduced, but have since shown some recovery. The population of the Kyrgyz breed was last reported to DAD-IS in 2002, when the total population was 78 300 head. In 2007 its conservation status was recorded by the FAO as "not at risk".

An association for the protection of the Kyrgyz Horse, the Fondation Kyrgyz Ate, was set up in Bishkek in the early twenty-first century. A breed standard was drawn up, based partly on a description found in archives in Saint Petersburg, and was approved by the national ministry of agriculture.

== Characteristics ==
The Kyrgyz Horse is a small mountain horse. It is sure-footed and agile, with the necessary stamina and endurance for the mountain environment. The coat may be dark or grey.

== Use ==
The Kyrgyz Horse is used as a riding horse, for horse-racing, and as a light harness horse. It is important for production of meat and milk. Horsemeat production in Kyrgyzstan in 2002 was 24 800 tonnes, about one eighth of the total meat produced in that year. The mare's milk is often fermented to make kumis.

With traditional mounted games such as kok-boru (also known in Kyrgyzstan as ulak-tartysh), oodarysh (mounted wrestling) and kyz-kuumai (meaning roughly "chase the girl"), the Kyrgyz Horse may be perceived as a symbol of the pre-Soviet nomadic past of Kyrgyz people, and thus as an element of post-Soviet Kyrgyz culture and national identity.
