= Kazakh ornaments =

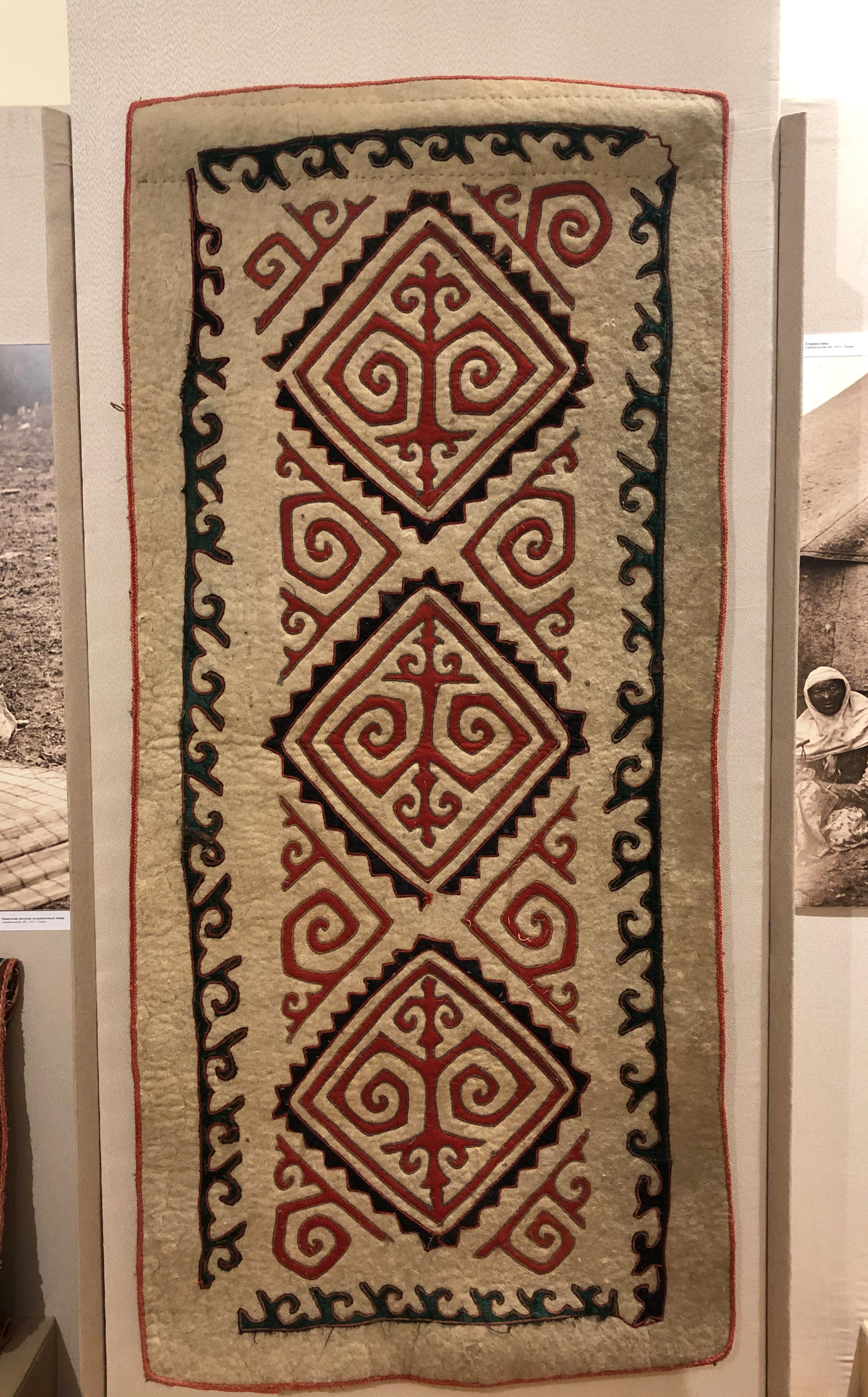
A Kazakh felt rug from the collection of the Russian Museum of Ethnography, St. Petersburg

Kazakh ornaments are decorative objects, especially rugs and dishes, employing patterns from Kazakh folk art. They are characterized by a diversity of designs, compositions and colors.

== History ==
- The first written mentions of Kazakh patterns and ornaments date back to the beginning of the 16th century. In ancient times, an ornament could be used to distinguish its owner's jüz, or clan. To the nomadic people of the Kazakh steppe, ornaments were imbued with protective power, similar to an amulet.
- In the aesthetic culture of the Kazakh people, the ornament reached a great variety of forms and took a dominant place at the end of the 19th century. The patterns reflected the surrounding reality: thus, if in the 19th century, plant ornaments predominated in clothing, most often tulips, then after Gagarin's flight into space, craftswomen embroidered rockets and stars.
- S. M. Dudin identifies four features of Kazakh ornamentation: equality of background and pattern, diversity of motifs of both pattern and background, limited color range of the ornament, and the presence of top and bottom in ornamental compositions.

== Types of ornaments ==
There are several main categories of ornaments, distinguished by their pattern, composition, and symmetry: zoomorphic, geometric, plant, and cosmogonic:

- The most common is the zoomorphic ornament. Zoomorphic patterns, such as koshkar muiz (ram's horn), kos muiz (connected horns), and tuye taban (camel track), were found in felt products (tekemet, syrmak), in weaving (baskur, alasha (rug), and other rugs), as well as in objects made of leather, bone, wood, and metal. In some ornaments, the pattern is made with the appliqué technique. Red, green, brown, white, and black tones are used.
- Geometric ornamental motifs are widespread in weaving, architectural decor (triangle, rhombus, cross, prehistoric swastika). It is found in the borders of carpet products, in the frame of the center, fields of tekemets — felt carpets. It is dyed in black, blue, burgundy, brown tones.
- Plant patterns are found in embroidery and weaving (flower, leaf, shoot). Freely filling the surface, such patterns do not leave a background, give the product an elegant and festive look. It is dyed in yellow, orange, red, pink, burgundy tones.
- Cosmogonic signs (sun, star, crescent) are used in carpet weaving to fill the central part of the composition, for example, the pattern "Kainar - spring" was born in a cattle farm that needed pastures and watering places. Light blue, blue, purple colors are used.

== Color and technique ==
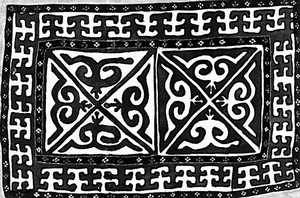
A patterned Kazakh felt carpet (Syrmaq).

Each color in the ornament has its own symbolism. For example, blue is a symbol of the sky, white is a symbol of joy and happiness, yellow is a symbol of knowledge and wisdom, red is a symbol of fire and sun, green is a symbol of youth and spring, and black is a symbol of the earth. In Kazakh decorative art, the eternal motif of the struggle between good and evil is represented by the unity of irreconcilable opposites. Each ornamental composition gives a picture of space, society, and personality in their unity. The triangle and the elements contained within it occupy a special place. The triangle signifies the unification of three worlds into one. According to traditional concepts, it depicts a fish, an arrow, and a bird, representing the three elements — water, earth, and air, while the motif of ram’s horns in the triangle represents the fourth element — fire.

The ornament is made using various techniques: it can be carved on wood, engraved or soldered on metal, rolled or sewn into felt, embroidered on fabric or woven on a pile carpet. The same motifs can be found on a wooden entrance door, the domed circle of the shanyrak, and on jewelry. In the yurt, all elements are fastened with patterned stripes: wall bars with poles, shashak bau (braided patterned cords with tassels) hanging from the shanyrak. In clothing, the edges of the hem, sleeves, collar, headdresses (skullcaps) and shoes are also ornamented, in tableware - the edges of wooden dishes, bowls, the circumference of ladles (ozhau) and dish covers (ayak-kap). In the Kazakh language, ornamentation is called “oyu”, which means “deepening, knocking out”, and the word dates back to ancient times, when the design was knocked out in stone.

Many applied art objects can claim the status of a symbol of nomadic art. Striking examples include: torsyk, a vessel for kymyz, sewn from matte embossed leather with horn curls on both sides, syrmak, a mosaic felt carpet, the main motif of which is ram's horns. The art of bone carvers, suyekshi, reached a high level. Wooden items were decorated with carved bone ornaments: bed backs, wooden headrests (zhastyk agash), stands (zhukayak) for storing rolled carpets, felts and blankets, finials ("tops") of kerege and uyks in a yurt, as well as musical instruments. The warmest of the materials is felt, samples of which have been found during excavations of burial sites of early nomads.

== See also ==
- Ornament
