= Culture of Kyrgyzstan =

The culture of Kyrgyzstan has a wide mix of ethnic groups and cultures, with the Kyrgyz being the majority group. It is generally considered that there are 40 Kyrgyz clans, symbolized by the 40-rayed yellow sun in the center of the flag. The red lines inside the sun visualise the crown of a yurt, the traditional dwelling of nomadic farmers, once the main population of the Central Asian area. The dominant religion of Kyrgyzstan is Sunni Islam (91%). The Russian population is Russian Orthodox.

== Languages ==
Kyrgyzstan is the only former Soviet Central Asian republic to start out with two official languages, in this case Russian and Kyrgyz. An aggressive post-Soviet campaign was established to make the latter the official national language in all commercial and government uses by 1997; Russian is still used extensively, and the non-Kyrgyz population, most not Kyrgyz speakers, are hostile to forcible Kyrgyzification.

Kyrgyzstan has a high literacy rate (99%), and a strong tradition of educating all citizens. However, its ambitious program to restructure the Soviet educational system is hampered by insufficient resources. School attendance is mandatory through grade nine. Kyrgyz is increasingly used for instruction; the transition from Russian to Kyrgyz has been hampered by lack of textbooks. It remains to be seen whether Russian will continue as the second language of choice, or whether English will supersede it as a lingua franca.

== Demographics ==
In 1992, the population of Kyrgyzstan was estimated as being 53% ethnic Kyrgyz, 22% Russian, 14.5% Uzbek, 1.9% Tatar, 0.5% Ukrainian, a population of Chinese Muslims known as the Dungan (1%), and a small community of Germans. Of some potential political significance are the Uyghurs. That group numbered only about 36,000 in Kyrgyzstan, but about 185,000 lived in neighboring Kazakhstan. The Uyghurs are also the majority population in the Xinjiang Uyghur Autonomous Region of China, whose population is about 24 million, located to the northeast of Kyrgyzstan.

== Literary works ==
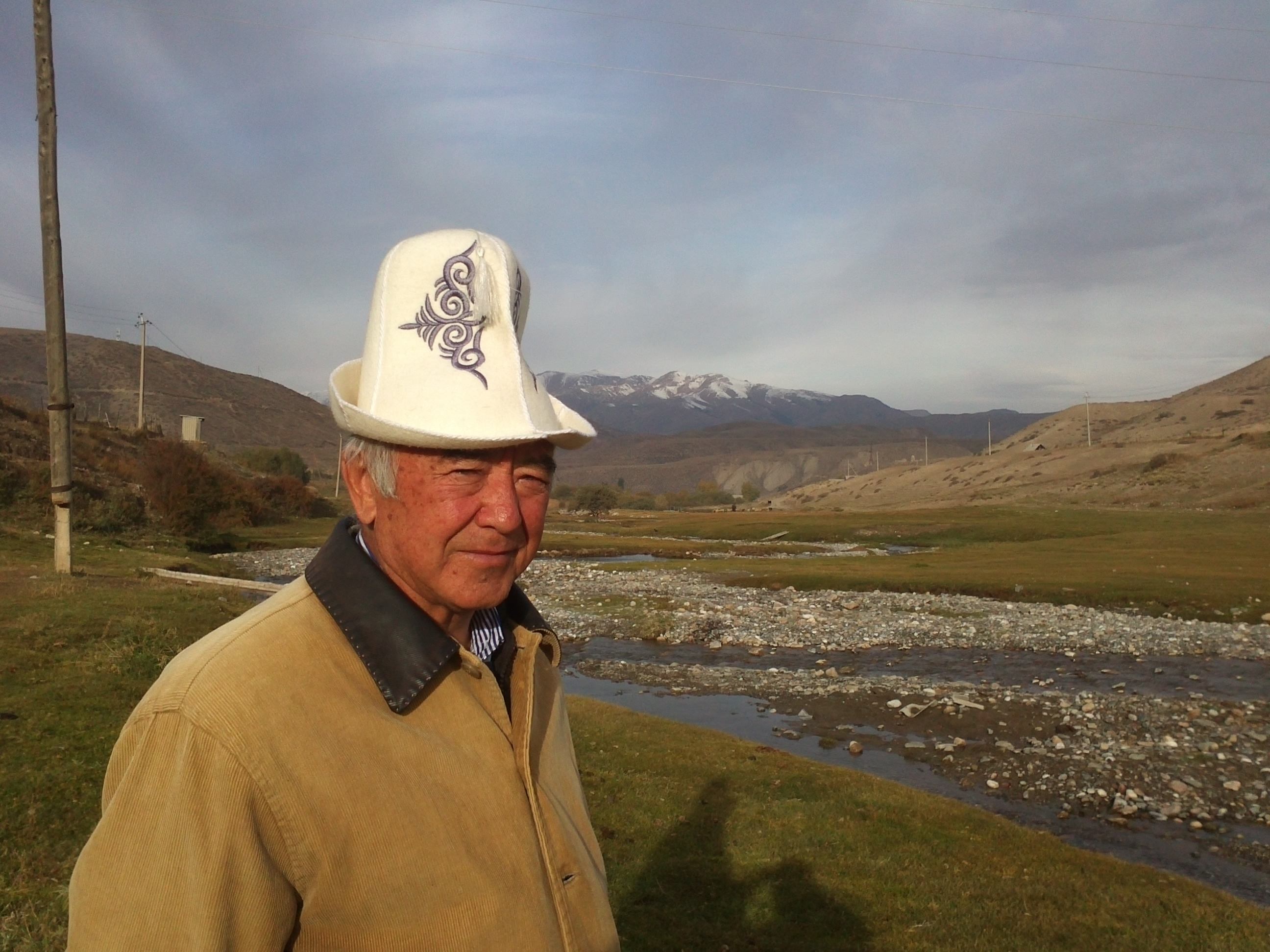
Kenesh Jusupov, a prominent Kyrgyz writer, in his home village of Echki-Bashy, Naryn district, 2012.

Manas is an orally transmitted epic poem told by manaschis, and the name of the epic's eponymous hero. The poem, with close to half a million lines, is twenty times longer than Homer's Odyssey, and one of the longest epics in the world. It is a patriotic work recounting the exploits of Manas and his descendants and followers, who, according to tradition, fought against the Chinese and Kalmyks in the 9th century to preserve Kyrgyz independence.

Chingiz Aytmatov is often referred to as a national writer of Kyrgyzstan. Kenesh Jusupov and Kasymaly Jantöshev are also prominent Kyrgyz writers. Jantöshev's novel Kanybek is regarded as one of the most popular novels in Kyrgyzstan.

== Textiles ==
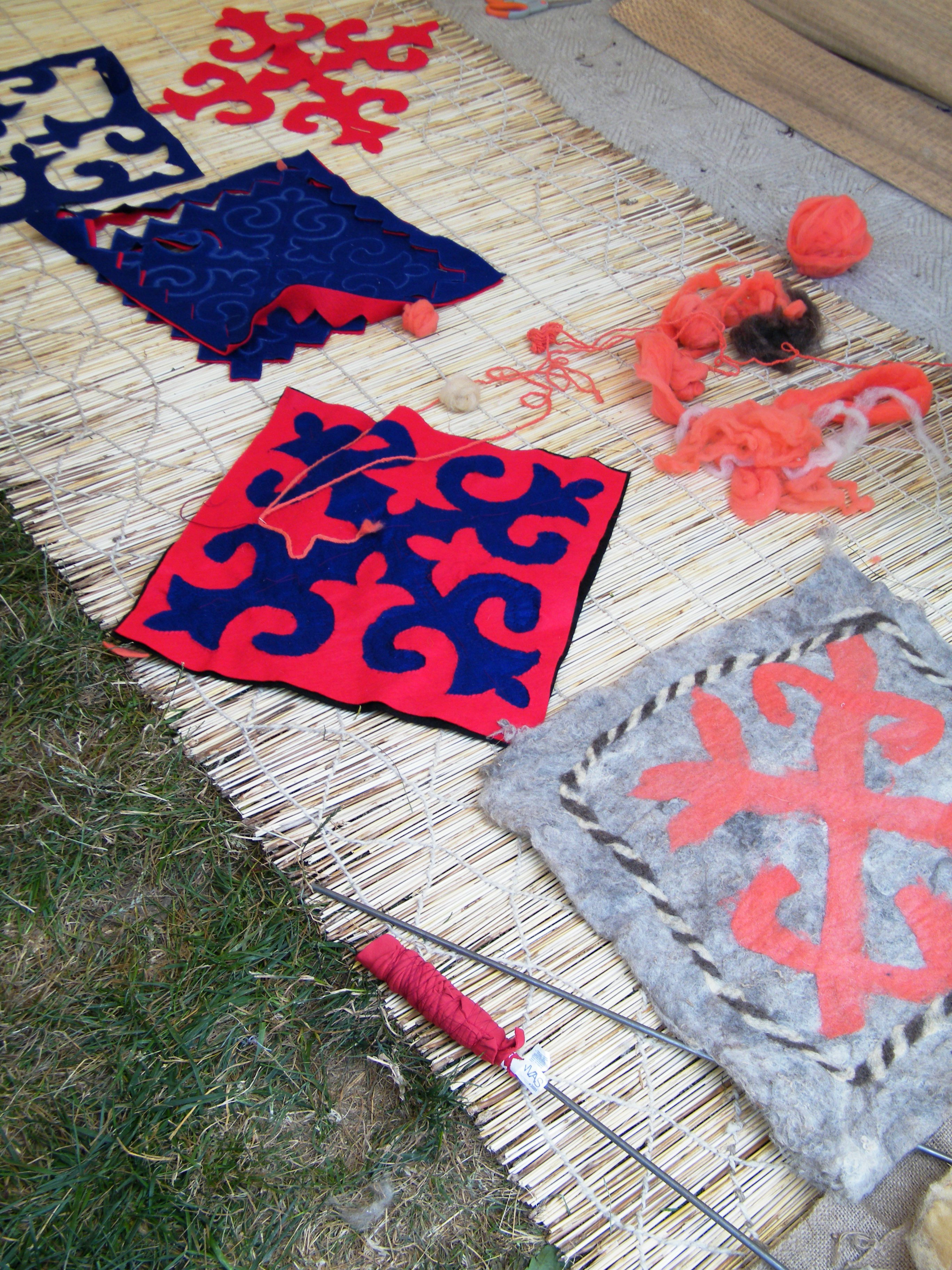
Kyrgyz shyrdak felt rugs

Traditionally manufactured felt carpets are one of the foremost arts of the Kyrgyz people and an integral part of their cultural heritage. Originally made by nomadic farming tribes to be used as building material for, and decoration of, their movable dwellings, the yurt, Kyrgyz women still produce a wide range of textiles, mostly from the wool of local sheep. Ancient patterns are nowadays adapted to the tourist and export market, but it is still a living tradition, in that most houses contain hand-made carpets or felt rugs, most widely known are the shyrdak and the ala kiyiz manufacturing style, also giving the carpets their name. Felt shyrdak cushions are usually made in shadow-pairs, these are seen on every chair, padding the seat. In present days the felt carpets are made by hand in two provinces of Kyrgyzstan: Naryn and Issyk-kul.

Tush kiyiz are large, elaborately embroidered wall hangings, traditionally made in Kyrgyzstan and Kazakhstan, by elder women to commemorate the marriage of a son or daughter.

Kalpaks are the Kyrgyz national hat, also almost always made of felt.

Colors and designs are chosen to symbolize Kyrgyz traditions and rural life. Flowers, plants, animals, stylized horns, national designs, and emblems of Kyrgyz life are often found in these ornate and colorful embroideries. Designs are sometimes dated and signed by the artist upon completion of the work, which may take years to finish. The tush kiyiz is hung in the yurt, over the marriage bed of the couple, and symbolize their pride in their Kyrgyz tradition.

== Cuisine ==
The cuisine of Kyrgyzstan is similar in many respects to that of its neighbors. Traditional Kyrgyz food revolves around mutton and horse meat, as well as various dairy products. The cooking techniques and major ingredients have been strongly influenced by the nation's nomadic way of life. Thus, most cooking techniques are conducive to the long-term preservation of food. Mutton (lamb) is the favorite meat, although many Kyrgyz are unable to afford it regularly.

Kyrgyzstan is home to many nationalities and their various cuisines. In larger cities, such as Bishkek, Osh, Jalal-Abad, and Karakol, various national and international cuisines can be found. On the road and in the villages, the cuisine tends to be standard Kyrgyz dishes, liberally flavored with oil or sheep fat, which are considered both delicious and healthy by the local population.

Pilaf (paloo) is the national dish in Kyrgyzstan. Green tea is considered the national beverage.

== Traditions ==
Illegal, but still practiced, is the tradition of bride kidnapping.

== See also ==
- Media of Kyrgyzstan
- Music of Kyrgyzstan
- LGBT rights in Kyrgyzstan (Gay rights)
- Islam in Kyrgyzstan
- Christianity in Kyrgyzstan
- Scouting in Kyrgyzstan
- Bergtal
- Tourism in Kyrgyzstan
- Horses in Kyrgyzstan
- "Эл адабияты" сериясы (collection of Kyrgyz epics and folk culture)
