= Where the Sky Meets the Land =

- Written by: Frank Müller
- Produced by: Frank Müller & Bernd Helthaler
- Distributed by: Salzgeber & Company Medien GmbH (GER)
- Release date: 2000
- Running time: 85 minutes
- Country: Germany
- Languages: English, Kyrgyz

Where the Sky Meets the Land (German: Wo der Himmel die Erde berührt) is a 2000 documentary film written and produced by Frank Müller. The film features Kyrgyzstan, the home of poet Tschingis Aitmatov and his characters, encounters with nomads, Kyrgyz traditions and the impressive scenery.

== Awards ==
- 1999
  - Pare Lorentz Award (International Documentary Association) - Won
  - IDA Award for Feature Documentary - Nominated
- 2000
  - Golden Spire Award for Film & Video - Society & Culture International (San Francisco International Film Festival) - Won
