= Novokirghiz =

Kyrgyz breed of horse

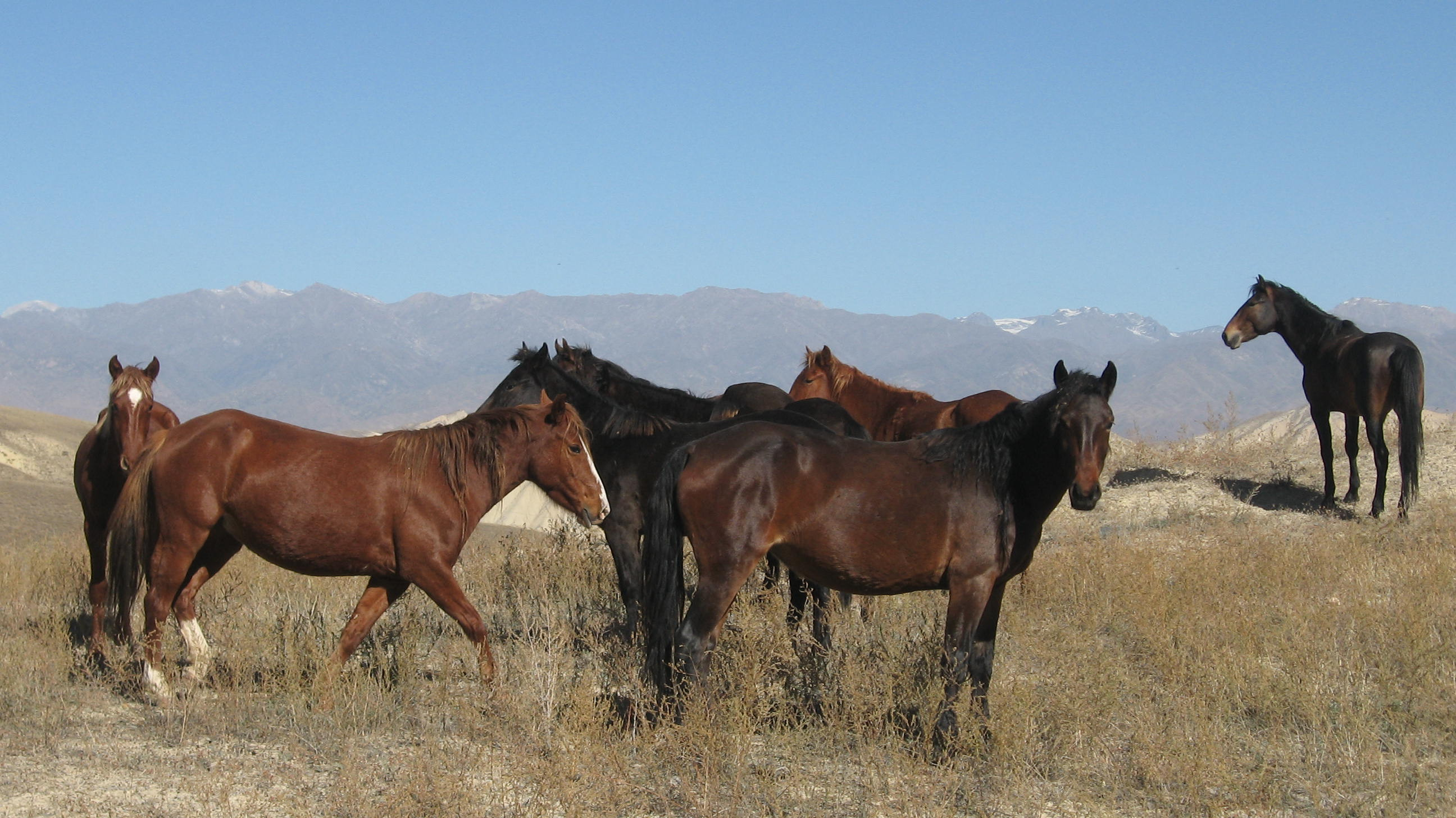
- Conservation status: FAO (2007): not at risk; DAD-IS (2022): unknown
- Other names: New Kirghiz; Novokirgizskaya
- Country of origin: Soviet Union; Kyrgyzstan
- Distribution: Kyrgyzstan

Traits
- Weight: Male: 455 kg; Female: 445 kg
- Height: Male: 155 cm; Female: 151 cm

Notes
- three types: original, saddle, heavy

The Novokirghiz or New Kirghiz is a modern Kyrgyz breed of horse. It was developed in the Kirghiz Soviet Socialist Republic in the mid-twentieth century through cross-breeding of the traditional Kyrgyz Horse of the region with introduced horses of Thoroughbred, Don and Anglo-Don stock.

== History ==
The Novokirghiz was bred in the mid-twentieth century in collective farms of the Kirghiz Soviet Socialist Republic, a constituent Union Republic of the Soviet Union. Horses of the traditional Kyrgyz Horse of the region were cross-bred with horses of a variety of other breeds, principally Thoroughbred, Don and Anglo-Don stock; some Turcoman and Kabarda stock may also have been used. The resulting horses closely resembled the Don. They were larger, faster, heavier and more powerful than the traditional Kyrgyz horses, but did not have the same rusticity or the same level of adaptation to the mountainous terrain of Kyrgyzstan. Three principal types developed within the new breed: the original or standard, the saddle and the heavy.

A stallion named Banket, foaled in 1946, won a five-day cross-country endurance contest over five hundred kilometres of mountainous terrain; he completed the distance in fifty-four hours with a rider and equipment weighing a hundred kilograms, outrunning a Don horse. A group of the horses from the Naryn state collective, carrying 150 kg between rider and gear, took 11 hours to complete a distance of 110 kilometres on paths through the mountains.

The Novokirghiz was officially recognised in 1954, and a stud-book was started. In 1980 a census of the population found some 114000 head, representing over half the horses in the Kirghiz SSR; a population of 56500 is also reported for the same year. In 2002 a population of 285000 head was reported; no population data has been reported since.. The conservation status of the breed was listed by the Food and Agriculture Organization of the United Nations in 2007 as 'not at risk'; in 2022 it was listed in DAD-IS as 'unknown'.

== Characteristics ==
The Novokirghiz is a small horse. In its early years heights at the withers were in the range 143–151 cm; this later increased to an average of about 155 cm. In 1989 the average height for stallions was reported to be 156 cm, and that for mares 151 cm. The coat is usually either bay or chestnut.

It is larger, heavier, faster and more powerful than the original Kirghiz horse, but has a less rustic constitution and is less well adapted to the harsh mountainous terrain of Kyrgyzstan. Three principal types are identified within the breed: the original or standard type, the saddle type and the heavy or massive type.

== Uses ==
Unlike many purposely-created breeds, the Novokirghiz was not bred for excellence in any one attribute, but to fill the same needs as the indigenous Kirghiz horse – as a riding horse, a draught horse, for horsemeat and for mare's milk – but more successfully. Mares of the heavy type can give up to 20 kg of milk per day.
