= Tush kyiz =

Kyrgyz and Kazakh wall hangings

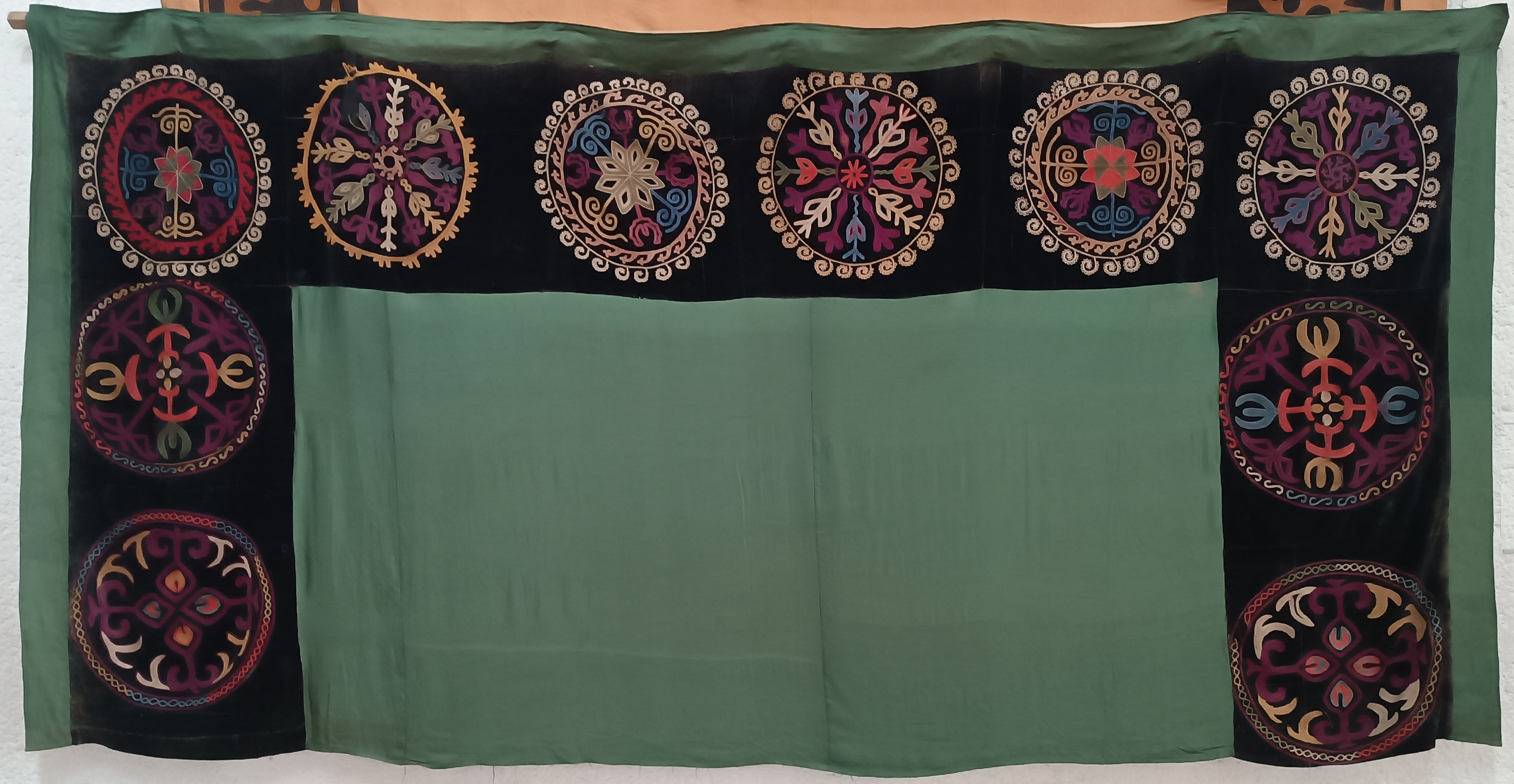
Tush kyiz.

Tush kyiz (Kyrgyz: туш кийиз [tuʃ kijíz], туш — side, the edge, кийиз — felt; Kazakh: тұс киіз) are large, elaborately embroidered wall hangings, traditionally made in Kyrgyzstan and Kazakhstan by women to commemorate the marriage of a son or daughter. Colors and designs are chosen to symbolize Kyrgyz traditions and rural life. Flowers, plants, animals, stylized horns, national designs, and emblems of Kyrgyz life are often found in these ornate and colorful embroideries. Designs are sometimes dated and signed by the artist upon completion of the work, which may take years to finish. The tush kyiz is hung in the yurt over the marriage bed of the couple, and symbolizes their pride in their Kyrgyz tradition.

The tush kyiz embroideries have been a family tradition among Kyrgyz people for centuries, but among the last two generations, the tradition has been confined to rural women. Shyrdaks (felt rugs) are still being made because these have always been an item for sale to the public. Tush kyiz, on the other hand, have always been created as a deeply personal family heirloom, symbolizing a newly married couple's union with family, regional, and national tradition.

== See also ==
- Shyrdak carpet
- Ala-kiyiz carpet
- Yomut carpet
- Afghan carpet
- Suzani
