= Shyrdak =

Traditional Central Asian rug of felted wool

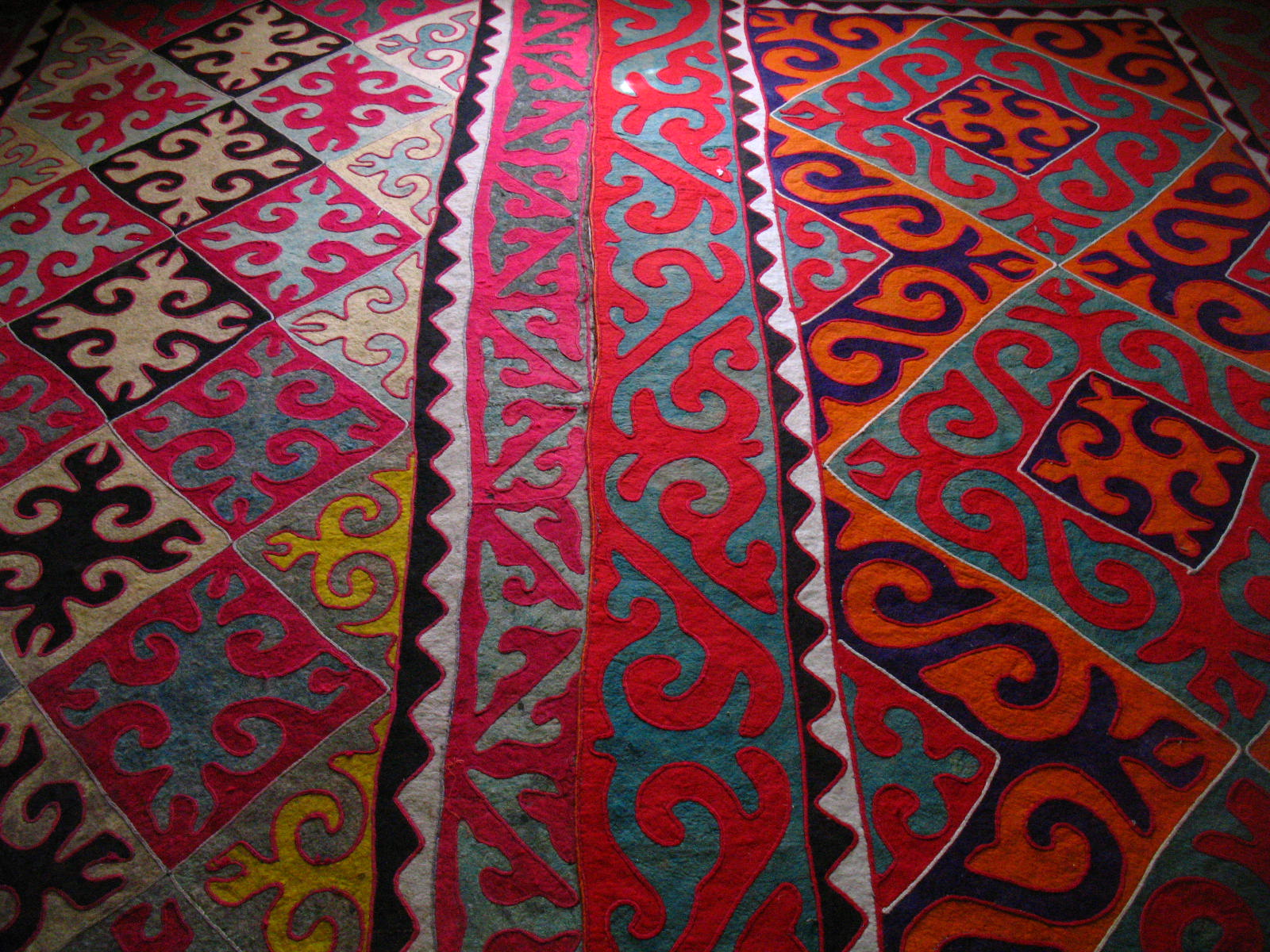
A shyrdak on the floor of a home in Aksy District, Kyrgyzstan

A shyrdak (Kyrgyz: шырдак, pronounced [ʃɯrˈdɑq]) or syrmak (Kazakh: сырмақ, romanized: syrmaq, pronounced [səɾˈmɑq]) is a stitched, and often colourful felt floor and wallcovering, usually handmade in Central Asia. Kazakhs and Kyrgyz people alike traditionally make shyrdaks, and most especially in Kyrgyzstan the tradition is kept alive, with products also sold to tourists.

In 2012, Kyrgyz felt carpets ala-kiyiz and shyrdak were inscribed into the UNESCO List of Intangible Cultural Heritage of Humanity in need of urgent protection.

== History ==
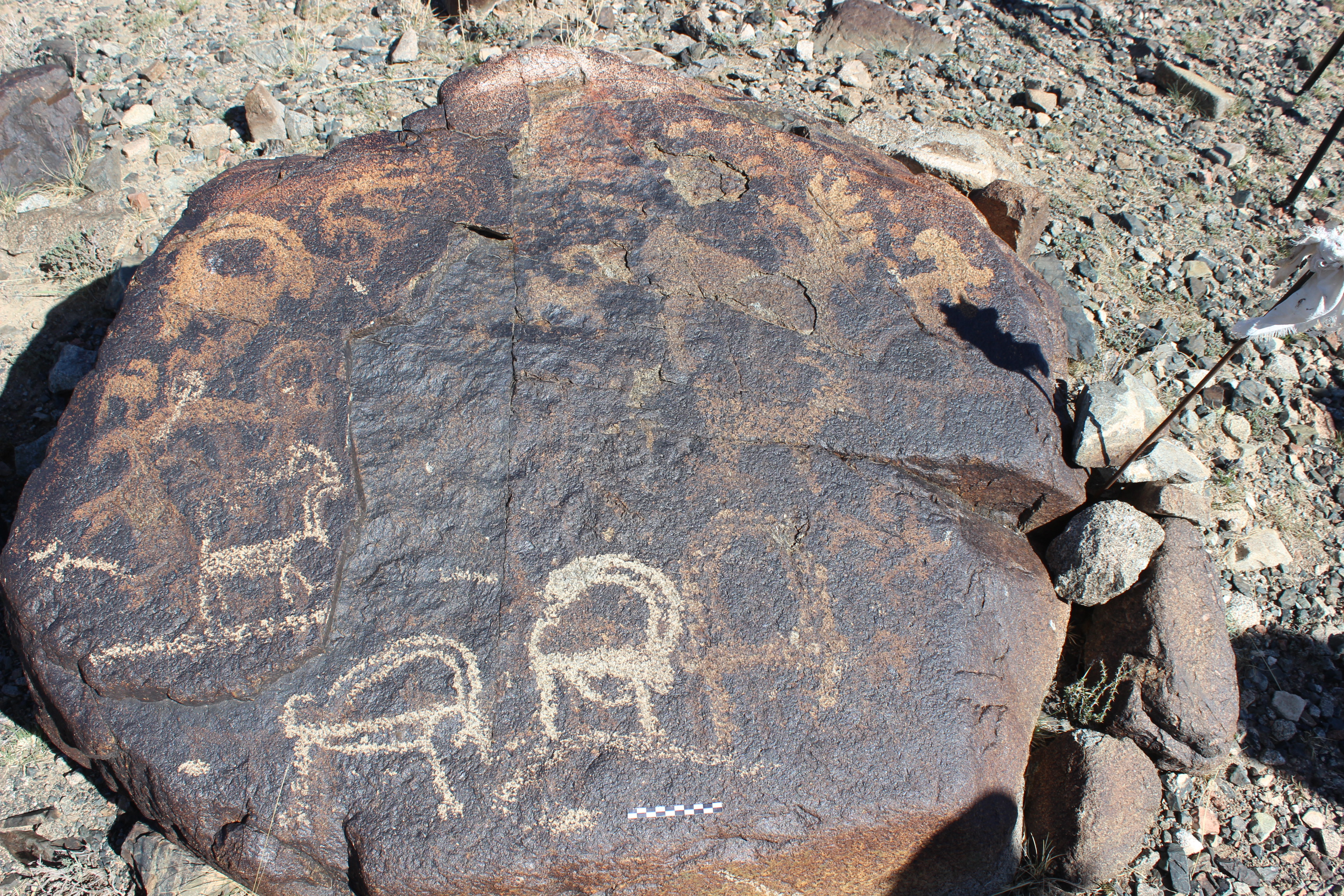
Petroglyphs of sheep, Sary-Kamysh, Kyrgyzstan

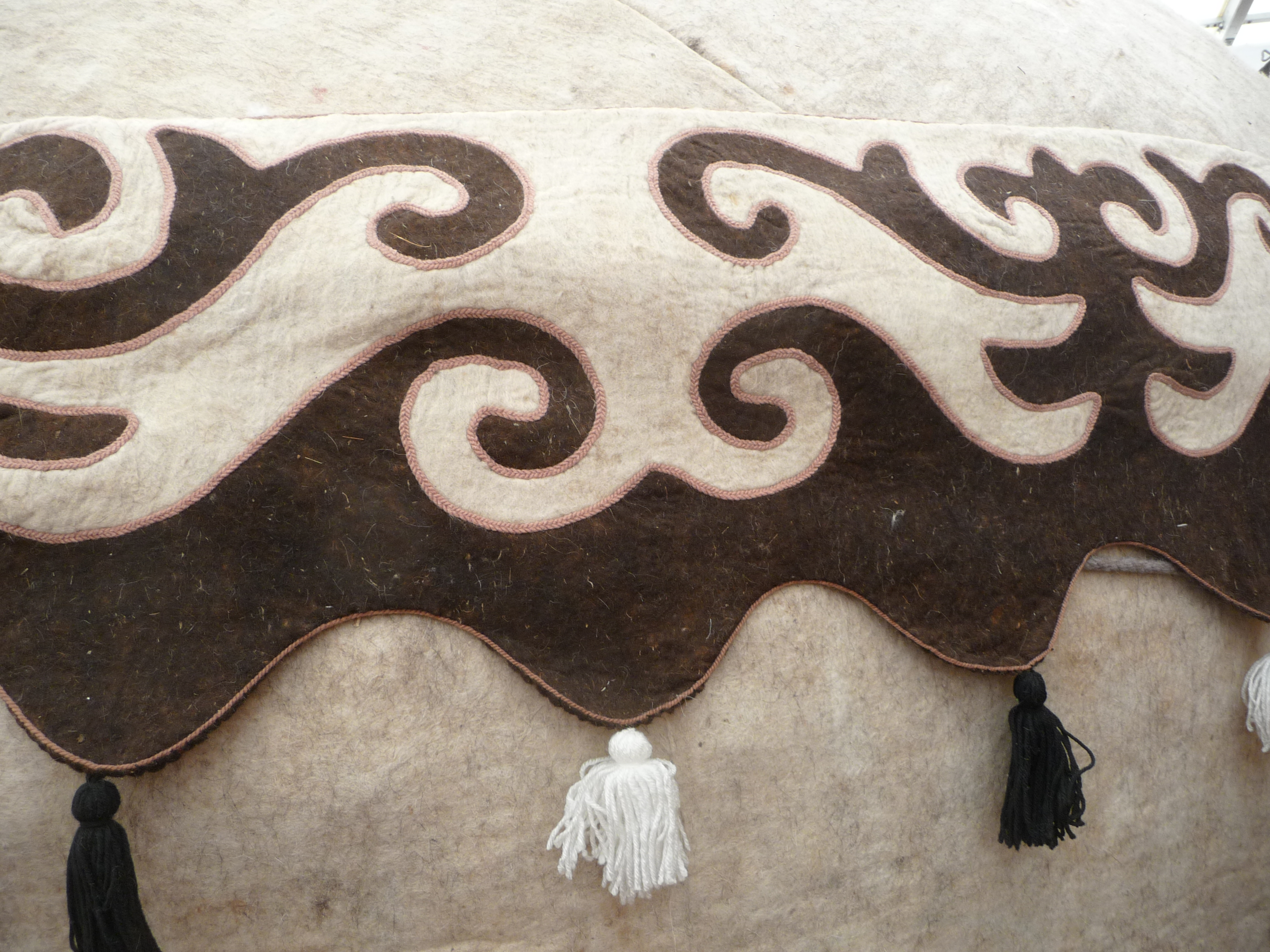
Shyrdak with pattern of sheephorns at the outside of a yurt

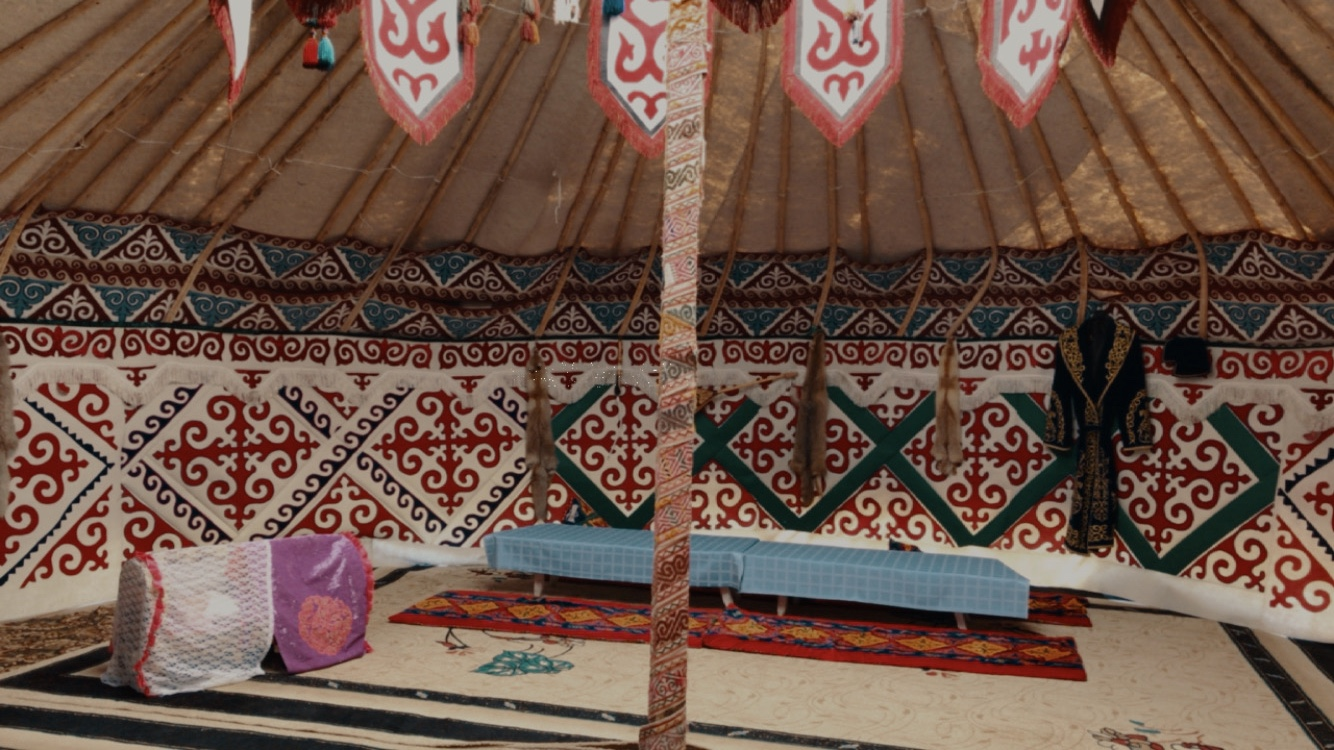
Kazakh yurt with Shyrdak carpet insulation and decoration, Kurmangazy Museum in Altynzhar, 2020

The history of felt production in Eurasia can be traced to the end of Bronze Age when sheep, goat, and horse herding were common activities of nomadic farmers of the region. During the early Iron Age nomadic culture acquired its specific character, producing mobile tents covered with felt, weaponry, horse harnesses, specific clothing, and items made of felt, hide, and wood.

In the burial mounds of the mountainous Altai region, Eastern Kazakhstan and Mongolia, many households, farming, and warfare items were discovered, including felt carpets that utilized mosaic, appliqué and quilting techniques, demonstrating a rich aesthetic and high level of skill.

== Manufacturing ==
It takes the wool from approximately five sheep to make one shyrdak rug. There is a considerable variation in the softness, durability, and amount of wool that local sheep produce. The autumn shearing provides the best wool because the sheep have been fed all spring and summer with nutritious fresh mountain vegetables. Done the traditional way, the process of felting and creating the rug takes time, all is done by hand. Traditionally, shyrdak rugs have been made by women. The fleece is dried and then beaten, to make the wool fluffy and divide good wool from unusable matted wool and dirt. Then, the wool is picked, clean washed, dried, and dyed, followed by the felting process.

=== Design ===
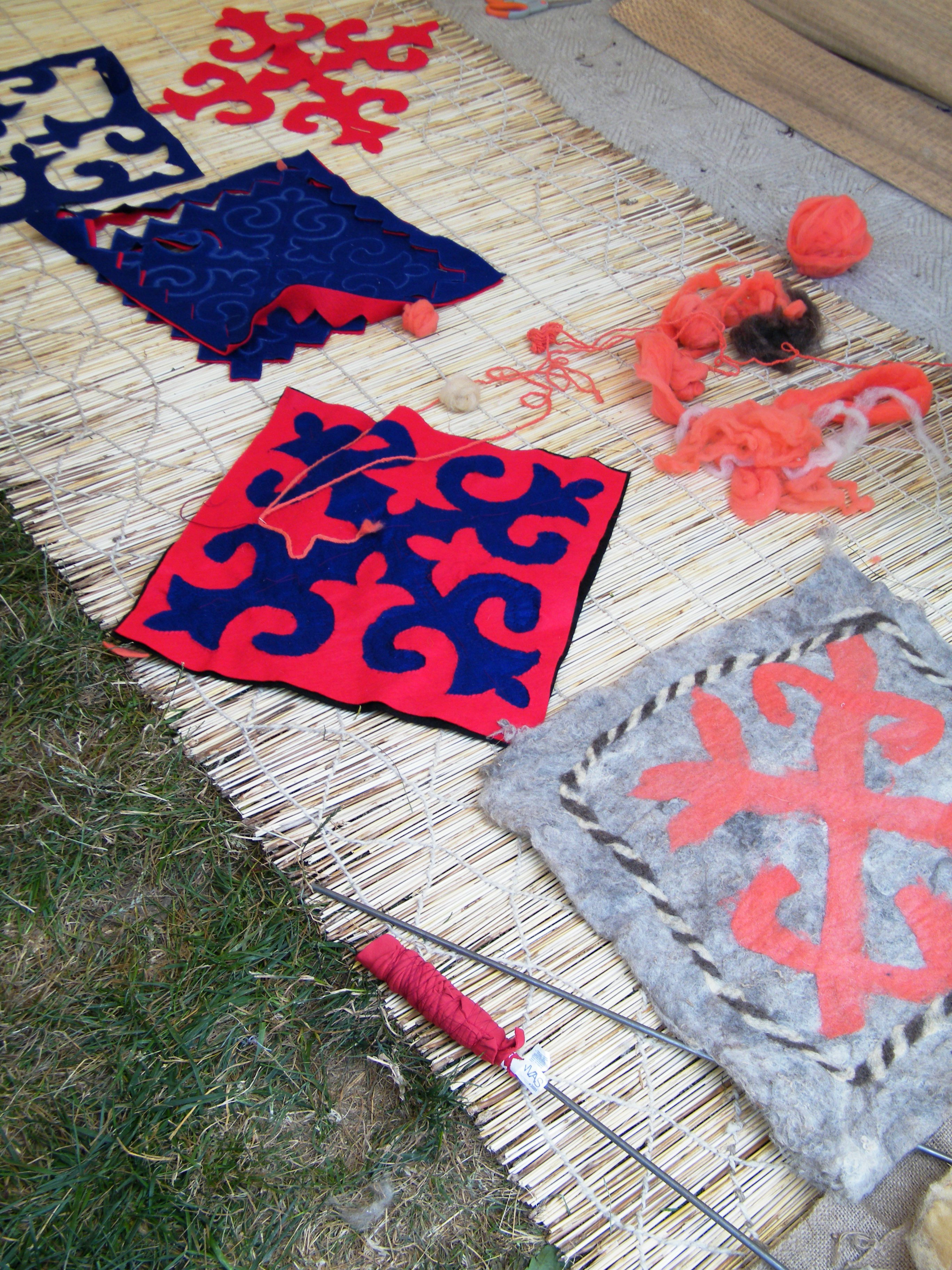
Steps in the process of making a shyrdak ornament

Pattern plays a key role in the shyrdak, they hold information and magical features. Widely used ornamental motifs are the triangle (tumar), as well as the black and white water (suu) border motif, considered to be a talisman that protects from evil. The ornaments also visualise blessings and wishes for the wellbeing of the receivers by the makers.

The Shyrdak is usually designed in an inlaid patchwork of highly contrasting colours such as red and green, yellow and black, brown and white. Once the wool is dried, a brightly coloured pattern is laid on to a plain background; this is then soaked with soap and water, rolled up, and literally pressed. This process is repeated.

Once the pattern starts to hold, the rug is reversed, soaked, and rolled again, after some hours the shyrdak rug is left to dry. Two contrasting layers of felt are then laid on top of one another and a pattern is then marked on the top layer in chalk. This is painstakingly and laboriously cut out with the felt maker frequently sharpening the knife, which will blunt quickly.

This creates a stunning positive/negative style visual image usually full of symbolic motif images that represent things around them i.e. the water, goat horns, a yurt etc. Representations of sheep and shepherds are particularly common in Kazakhstan. The felt that is cut from the top layer is not wasted and is used to create another mirror image shyrdak with the reverse colours of the original shyrdak.

== See also ==
- Tush kyiz
- Ala kiyiz
