= Ala kiyiz =

Traditional felted textile of Kyrgyzstan and Kazakhstan

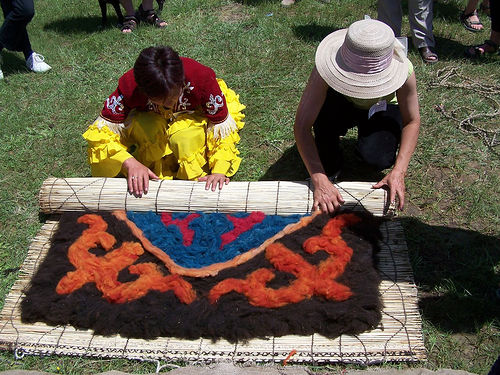
Ala-kiyiz in making. After wool has been formed in patterns, the cloth is being rolled together for the fulling process.

Ala kiyiz (Kyrgyz: ала кийиз, IPA: [ɑɫɑ kʰijíz]) or tekemet (Kazakh: текемет, IPA: [tʰʲekʰʲemʲét]) is an ornamenting style for textile floor- or wallcovering made by pressing wet, soaped wool of various colours together to make it felt. The chemical process of felting transforms the loose woolen fibers into a thick cloth. The felt carpet-making technique is a traditional folk art among the nomadic farming Kazakh, Kyrgyz and Mongolian peoples of the Tien Shan mountains and the steppes in Central Asia for over two and a half thousand years. From the various methods of ornamenting, ala kiyiz is among the widest spread, with shyrdak.

The motley felts traditionally were made from local sheep’s wool of autumn shearing. The carpets are a component of the insulation and decoration of the yurt or ger, a movable round tent that is the nomadic dwelling throughout Central Asia.

In 2012, Kyrgyz felt carpets ala-kiyiz and shyrdak were inscribed into the UNESCO List of Intangible Cultural Heritage of Humanity in need of urgent protection.

== History ==
The history of felt production in Eurasia can be traced to the end of Bronze Age when sheep, goat and horse herding were common activities of nomadic farmers of the region. During the early Iron Age nomadic culture acquired its specific character, producing mobile tents covered with felt, weaponry, horse harnesses, specific clothing and items made of felt, hide and wood. In burial mounds of the Altai Mountains, Eastern Kazakhstan and Mongolia, many items were discovered, from farming tools to weaponry and household items. including felt carpets that utilized mosaic, applique and quilting techniques, demonstrating a rich aesthetic and high level of skill.

== Manufacturing ==
The first step is shearing the sheep, than the raw fleeces have to be washed, sorted by quality and color and dyed. The loose wool fiber is placed on a sedge mat chij or chiy and whipped for several hours with a stick to make it fluffy. Than the patterns are being laid out, the resulting wool mat can be several inches thick. After that the wool is rinsed with hot water and soap, tapped by hand, rolled in the chij, stringed around it and taken to an open space to be rolled, kicked and trodden for several hours. Another technique is to have the rolled up reed mat being towed by a horse, heating and meshing the wool inside. This melds the wool together into a friable carpet. The mat is then unwound and the resulting felt left to dry. After this usually no stitching or other work is done.

A rug that has been worn out, can be used as the back of a new rug.

=== Patterns ===
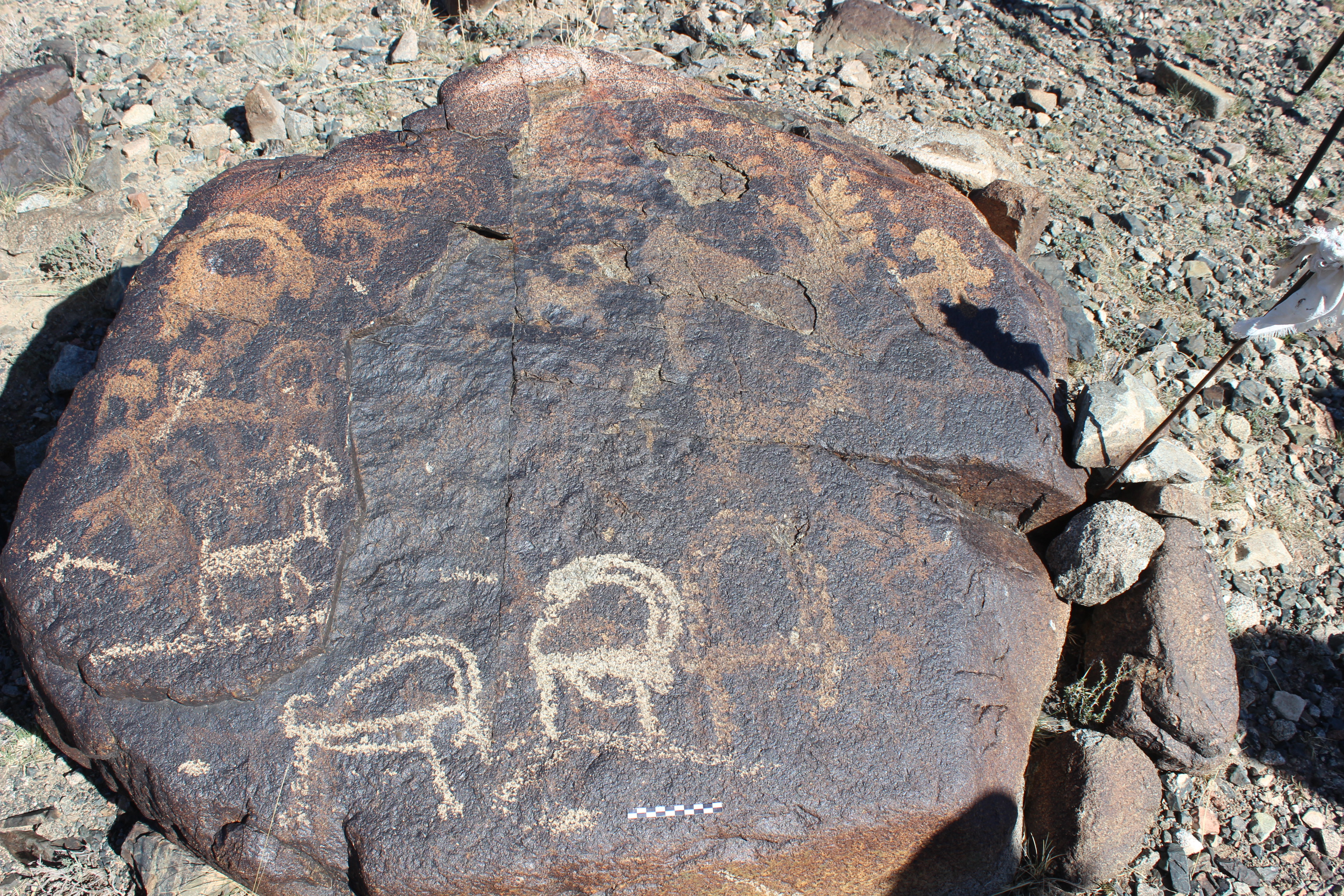
Prehistoric petroglyphs of sheep, Sary, Kamysh, Kyrgyz Republic. The horns are famous symbols used in felted rugs.

Ala kiyiz patterns are made by the technique of tipping coloured wool into a one-colour background, mostly grey, brown or black. Ornaments consist of geometrical, botanical and zoomorphic motifs, visualising good wishes or blessing of the makers to a daughter who gets married, to children or grandchildren. Geometrical motifs consist of ovals or diamonds (tabak oyuu), straight, zigzag and wavy lines, these are among the most ancient. Zoomorphic motifs are, among others, the muyuz (horn), syngan muyuz (broken horn), karga tyrmak (crow’s claw) and it kuiruk (dog’s tail). They signify prosperity, wealth and are considered to be protection symbols. There is one master, Ormokchu, or the good hand at felt, who creates the message the ornaments of the ala kiyiz will tell, outlines the pattern and oversees the process.

== See also ==
- Tush kyiz
- Shyrdak
