= Kyz kuu =

Turkic traditional sport

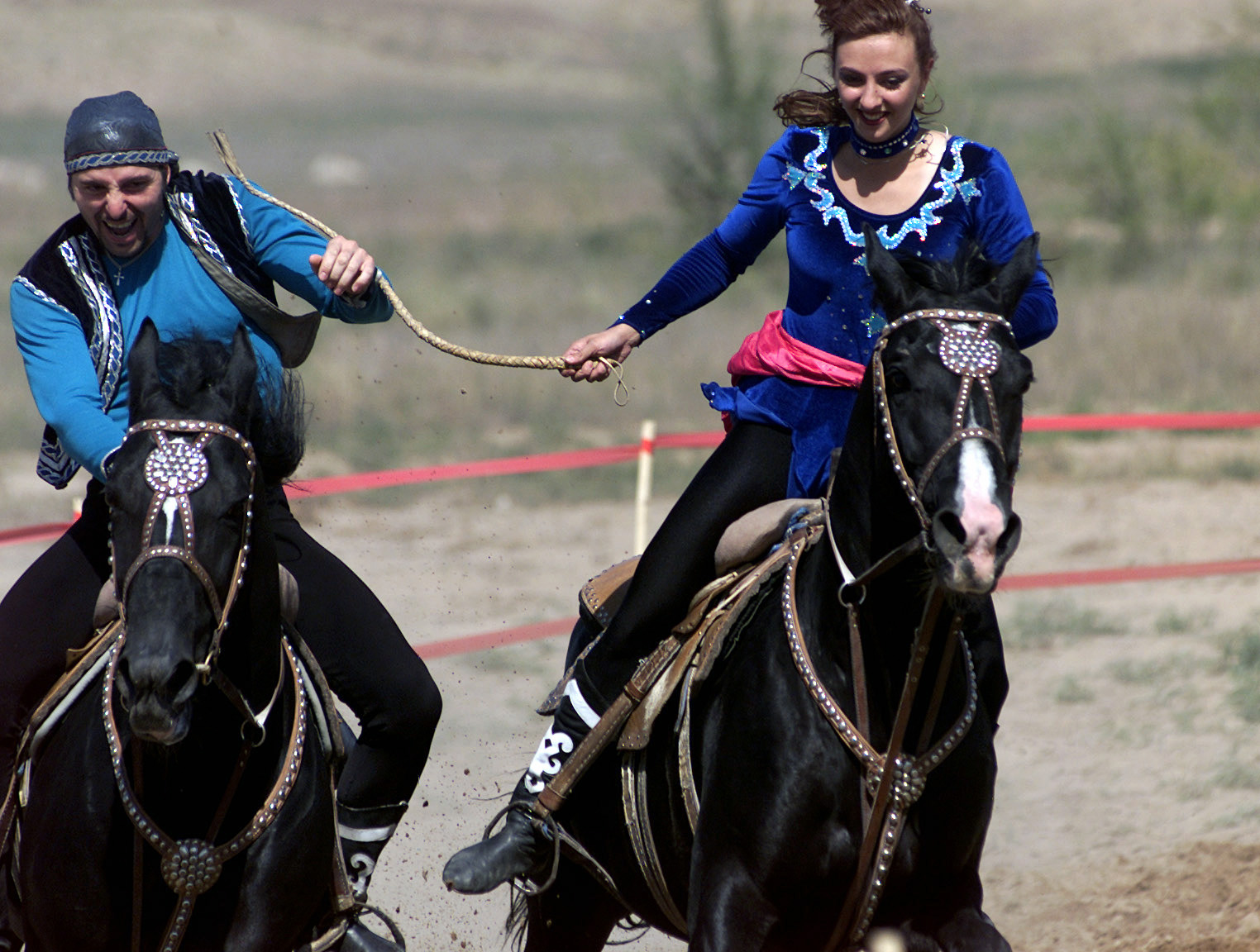
Riders in traditional Kazakh dress play Kyz kuar. In the depiction, the young woman is winning by whipping the young man.

Kyz kuu (Azerbaijani: qız-qov; Kazakh: qyz quu; Kyrgyz: kyz kuumai; lit. 'girl-chasing') is an equestrian traditional sport among Turkic peoples such as Azerbaijanis, Kazakhs and Kyrgyz. It exhibits elements of horse racing but is often referred to as a "kissing game".

A young man on horseback waits at a starting line. A young woman, also mounted, starts her horse galloping from a given distance behind the young man. When the young woman passes the young man, he may start his horse galloping. The two race towards a finish line some distance ahead. If the young man is able to catch up to the young woman before they reach the finish line, he may reach out to her and steal a kiss, which constitutes victory. However, if the young man has not caught up to the young woman by the time they reach the finish line, the young woman turns around and chases the young man back to the starting line. If she is in range of the young man, she may use her whip to beat him, which signifies a victory for her.

== See also ==
- World Nomad Games

== Bibliography ==
- King, David C. (2006). Kyrgyzstan. Marshall Cavendish. p. 111. ISBN 978-0-7614-2013-2.
