= Mare milk =

Milk produced by female horses

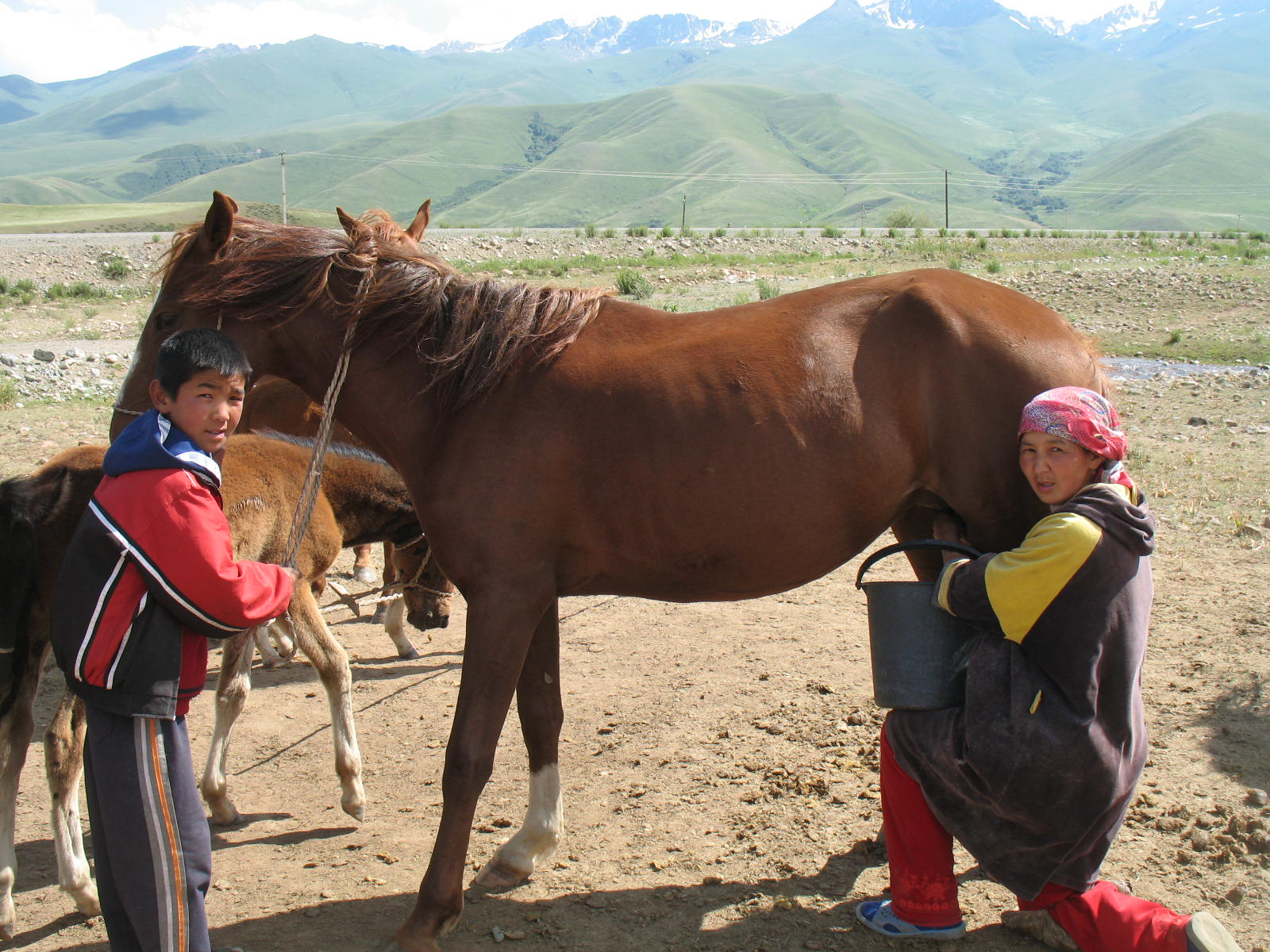
Milking of a mare in Kyrgyzstan

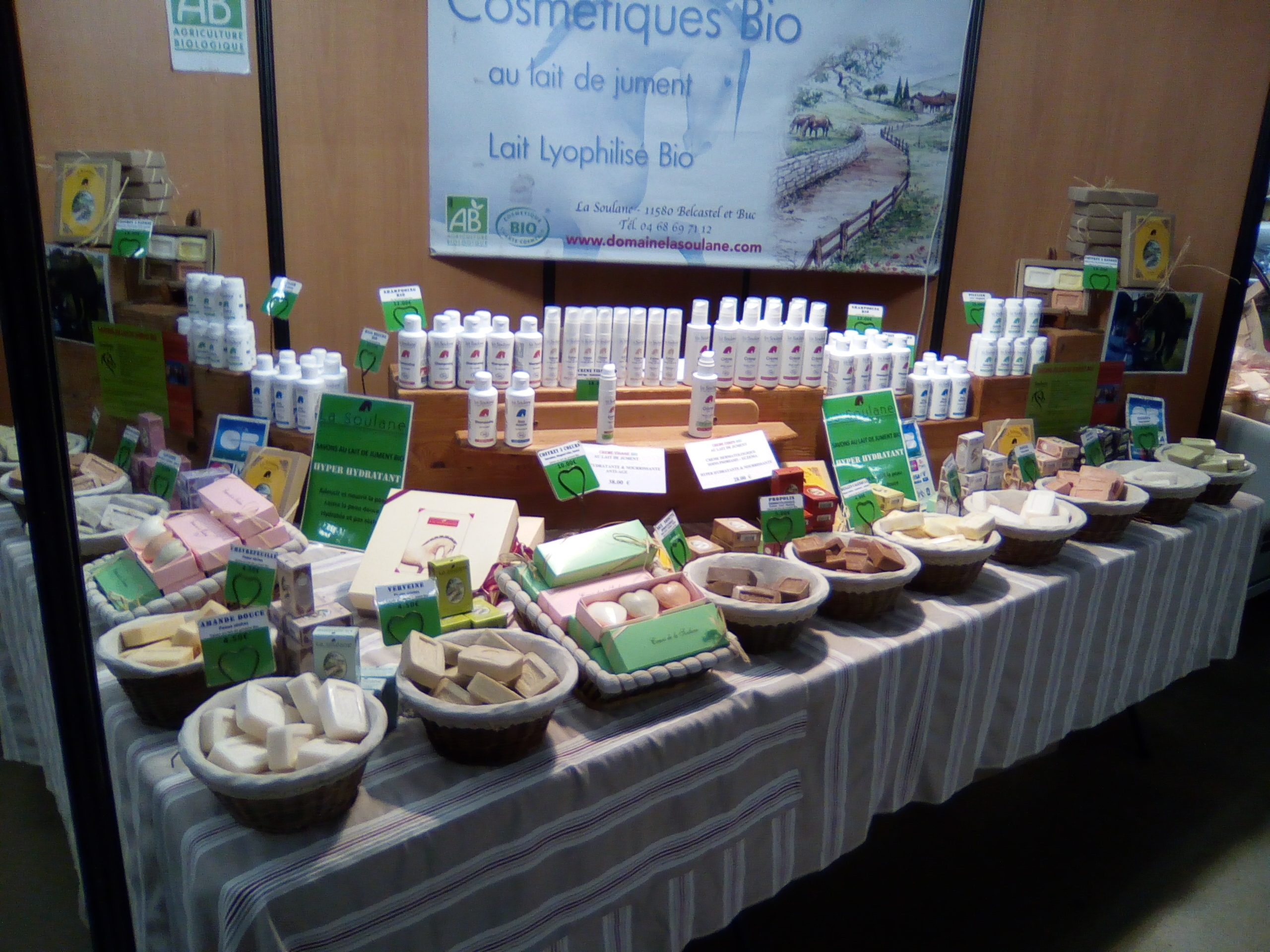
Cosmetics made of mare milk in Paris, France

Mare milk is milk lactated by female horses, known as mares, to feed their foals. It is rich in whey protein, polyunsaturated fatty acids and vitamin C, and is a key ingredient in kumis. In several European countries, including Germany, it is sold powdered.

Mare milk is sometimes chosen over cow milk for its purported health benefits. A niche market considers it a remedy for skin or digestive problems. Peer-reviewed papers suggest it can reduce atopic dermatitis or eczema. It is used to make cosmetics and can form cheese with camel rennet, but not bovine.

== See also ==
- Horse meat
- Donkey milk
- Goat milk
- Moose milk
- Sheep milk
- Camel milk
