= Laurence Bougault =

French writer, long-distance horse rider

- Born: 25 August 1970; Toulouse, France
- Died: 26 October 2018 (aged 48); Rennes, France
- Education: University of Sorbonne Nouvelle
- Occupations: Academic; Writer; Horseback adventurer
- Known for: Multi-country horse treks

Laurence Bougault (25 August 1970 – 26 October 2018) was a French writer and academic. She was also well known as a long-distance adventurer on horseback.

== Biography ==
Bougault studied literature in Lyon in preparation for university studies in Paris. Certified in Modern Letters in 1992, she defended her Ph.D. dissertation in French literature at the University of Sorbonne Nouvelle Paris 3 under the supervision of Philippe Hamon, which was titled Cosmos and Logos in Modern Poetry. Appointed Assistant Professor at the University of Rennes in 1998, she moved to Brittany. In 2005, she began directing research at the Sorbonne University, under the direction of linguist Olivier Soutet. She supervised the dissertation of Stéphane Gallon at the University of Rennes, in 2013.

Bougault regularly published poems and essays on literary criticism and French stylistics as well as educational works. Her research was centered on two themes: the relationship between aesthetics and ethics in literary work, and the question of the effects of meaning produced by the syntactic choices in modern and contemporary poetry. At the same time, Bougault wrote and published newsletters, poetry, essays and short stories.

She received the Discovery grant in 2002 from the country's Centre National du Livre (National Center for Books) to continue her research. Whether in poetry or in prose, Bougault's writing sought to address the intensity of the “body-mind” states and the way in which these states work together.

In 2004, she founded the International Stylistic Association (AIS), to bring together linguistic researchers to make their work better known. According to an obituary, "she has greatly contributed to giving this discipline the consistency of a field of research."

=== Long-distance adventurer ===
As a very young girl, Bougault became passionate about the equestrian world and engaged in long distances travels on horseback. It began in 1997 with a trip to Mongolia. For her first long-distance endurance trip in 2001, she crossed southeast Africa from Lesotho, through South Africa, and northward to Malawi, a distance of 3,300 kilometres (2,100 mi), in eight months. That trip, with two Basuto ponies known for great stamina and courage, resulted in a written account of the adventure: Under the Eye of African Horses, published in French by Belin in 2003.

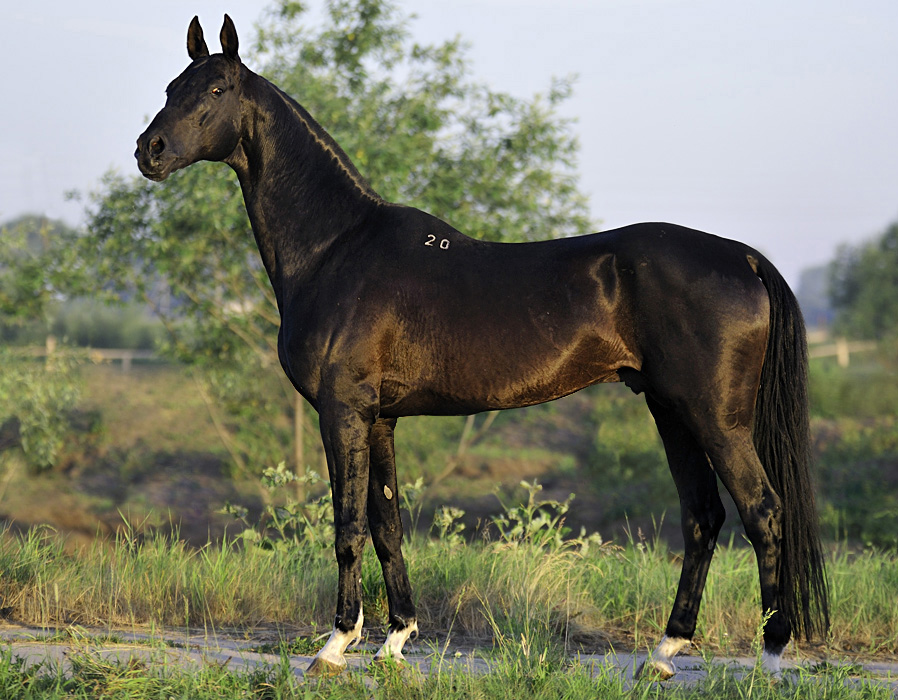
An Akhal-Teke stallion.

Bougault then began breeding a refined and rare equine, the Akhal-Teke, a Turkmen race horse and prized for its endurance, intelligence, and the distinctive sheen of its coat. In 2009, she made a second long-distance trip on an Akhal-Teke from Isfahan, Iran westward to Turkey, Greece, Italy and finally to Paris, a trip of 6,500 kilometres (4,000 mi) in less than six months.

She was interviewed near the conclusion of that trek, after she reached Fontainebleau, near Paris.

I think I fulfilled my mission as an “Amazon of peace” especially in Iran and Turkey where the people I met were surprised to see a Westerner who accepted their rules and who conveyed values that were theirs. All this has created strong links between these countries and me.

=== Last years ===
Bougault died from an illness at the age of 48 on 26 October 2018 in Rennes, and was survived by her son and parents.

== Selected publications ==
=== Essays ===
- Poésie et réalité (Poetry and reality), essay based on her dissertation: Cosmos et logos dans la poésie moderne, L’Harmattan, 2005. (ISBN 274-7-58295-7)
- Guillevic et la langue, actes du colloque éponyme, Rennes, éditions Calliopées, 2009. (ISBN 978-2-916-60818-1)
- Stylistiques?, actes du colloque éponyme (co-direction), Rennes, PUR, 2010. (ISBN 978-2-753-51054-8)
- Lorand Gaspar et la langue (co-direction), éditions styl-m de l’AIS, 2011.
- Le style, découpeur du réel (co-direction), PUR, 2014.

=== Poems ===
- Le Grand Jouir, recueil poétique, Le Rewidiage, 1998.
- Éclats, recueil de poèmes publiés avec le concours du CNL, éditions du Sandre, 2003. (ISBN 2-914958-01-3) . Extracts published in Poésie Terrestre, no. 8, December 1996 et La femelle du requin no. 7, February–March 1997.
- Espoir, poème, dans Poésie Terrestre no. 7, 1996.
- Le Grand Jouir, extrait, dans Phréatique no. 83, Autumn 1997.
- Ode famélique de Toi, poème, dans L’igloo dans la dune no. 92, June 1999.
- Irradiance, poème, dans L’igloo dans la dune no. 94, December 1999.
- Poétiques, poèmes, dans Hématomes Crochus HC9, March 2001.
- L’attente et le chemin, dans Hématomes Crochus HC13, 2003.

=== Works about horses ===
- Chevauchons ensemble, Histoires d’amour et de chevaux (avec Jean-Louis Gouraud), éditions du Rocher, 2005.
- Éclats de chevauchées & Poèmes d’Amour-Cheval, éd. Cheval-Culture, 2012.
- Sous l’œil des chevaux d’Afrique (Under the Eye of African Horses) coll. Les cavalières de l'aventure, Belin, 2003, (ISBN 978-2-701-13681-3)
- Chevaux entiers et étalons, mieux les connaître, mieux les comprendre, éd. du Rocher, 2009. (ISBN 978-2-268-06704-9)
- La Liberté du Centaure, petit traité sur le voyage à cheval, Transboréal, 2010, (ISBN 978-2-361-57011-8)
- Amazone de la Paix, tome 1 et 2, éd. Cheval-Culture, 2013, (ISBN 978-2-953-79523-3)
- La liberta del cavalcare, piccolo trattato sul viaggio a cavallo, Ediciclo, (ISBN 978-8-865-49100-3)
- Approches linguistiques du vocabulaire équestre, coédition Cheval-Culture/Presses Universitaires de Rennes/Cadre noir de Saumur, 2015, (ISBN 978-2-953-79525-7)
- Le Cheval et l’amour (avec J.-L. Gouraud), Les Cahiers Arts Equestres, coll. Actes équestres, Actes Sud, 2016. (ISBN 978-2-330-05049-8)
- Égo-Dictionnaire du cheval, Pietraserena, éd. Dumane, 2017. (ISBN 978-2-915-94317-7)
