= Geldi Kärizow =

Akhal Teke breeder and former Minister

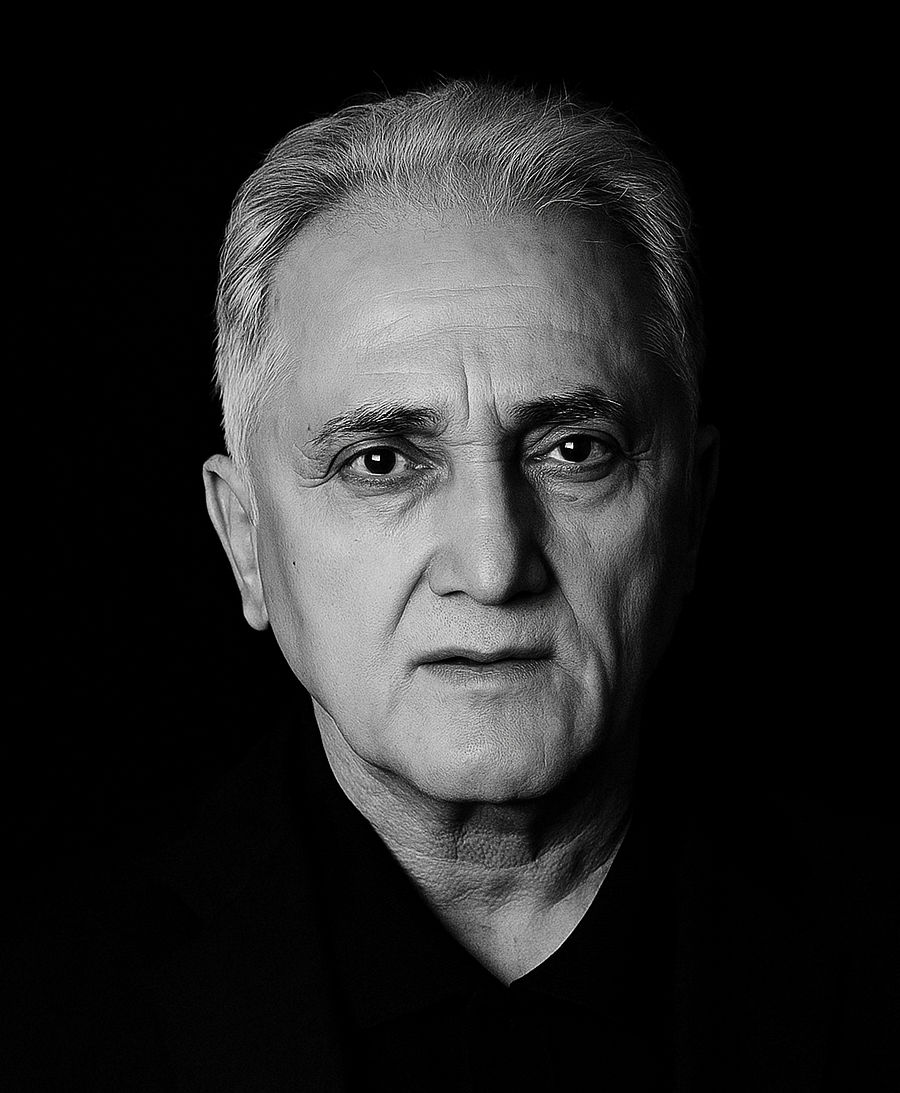
- Born: 18 January 1951 (age 75)
- Occupations: Horse breeder and former Minister
- Awards: Fellow, Royal Geographical Society
- Website: www.geldykyarizov.com

Geldi Kärizow, also spelled Geldy Kyarizov, FRGS (born January 18, 1951 ~ Turkmen Soviet Socialist Republic) is an internationally renowned breeder of Akhal-Teke horses and former Horse Minister for the Government of Turkmenistan (Government Association Turkmen Atlary).

In 2002, Kärizow was arrested by the administration of Saparmyrat Nyýazow on charges including abuse of office and negligence; a trial recognised by the international community as groundless and politically motivated. Kärizow was sentenced to six years imprisonment. Released in 2007, Kärizow left Turkmenistan in 2015 and now resides in exile, in Prague, Czech Republic.

In 2024, after years of legal battles with Turkmenistan, the United Nations Human Rights Committee issued a landmark decision in July 2024, recognising the severe violations of his rights by the Turkmenistan state.

== Biography ==
A longtime champion of the Akhal-Teke, Kärizow was instrumental in reviving their fortunes after the 1991 breakup of the Soviet Union and Turkmenistan's independence. Recognised for his role, then Turkmenistan President Saparmyrat Nyýazow, invited Kärizow to join his government as Horse Minister (1997–2002); subsequently transformed into the Turkmen Atlary State Agency.

Tasked with establishing an Akhal-Teke studbook using DNA analysis, Kärizow discovered that Thoroughbred blood had been introduced into the Akhal-Teke breed, particularly for racing purposes. Kärizow's decision to make this information public was seen as a threat to the horse-breeding establishment, which profited from the crossbreeding and led to his falling out of favour with the Nyýazow government.

In January 2002, Kärizow was arrested by the Ministry of National Security (MNS). Sentenced to six years imprisonment in April 2002, in August 2006, Kärizow was transferred to a strict regime prison (Owadan-depe). Kärizow's complaints concerning his imprisonment and unlawful transfer were not answered. The prison director told Kärizow that he had no right to complain, no name and no last name, and from that point, he was known as “No. 3”. Kärizow was released in 2007 by Nyýazow's successor Gurbanguly Berdimuhamedow.

Following his release, Kärizow and his family members were under constant surveillance, his phone was tapped and his correspondence was censored. Kärizow's properties were confiscated and his horses taken to the presidential stud farm. Barred from leaving Turkmenistan and shut out of the horse-breeding community, Kärizow has spent the following years battling the Turkmen state for restitution.

Kärizow remained in very poor health after his release and needed urgent specialist care, but was prohibited from leaving the country. Finally granted permission to travel on September 14, 2015, his daughter Sofia and sister-in-law were denied permission to leave. Due to international pressure, the authorities relented six days later and on September 20, 2015, his daughter and sister-in-law joined their family in Moscow.

Kärizow and his family moved to the Russian Federation in 2015 and the Czech Republic in April 2016, where they were granted refugee status.

In 2017, Kärizow, his wife Yulia Serebryannik and sister-in-law Diana Serebryannik, established Rights and Freedoms of Turkmenistans Citizens. RFTC's goal is to achieve the observance of the rights and freedoms of the citizens of Turkmenistan. RFTC is a member of Boost, a regional acceleration program for social impact innovators in Europe and Central Asia. Boost is a United Nations Development Programme.

On July 9, 2024, the United Nations Human Rights Committee issued their decision re- 'Geldy Kyarizov vs the State of Turkmenistan' (CCPR/C/141/D/3097/2018). A complaint was submitted in response to egregious violations of Kärizow's human rights, including unlawful detention, torture, and the confiscation of his property. After a thorough examination the Committee concluded that Turkmenistan is obligated to fully compensate Kärizow. Kärizow was awarded US$7,547,000,000. Turkmenistan have yet to make restitution.

== Ashgabat to Moscow ==
In 1988, Kärizow rode an Akhal-Teke from Ashgabat to Moscow, a distance of over 4,000 kilometers (including 370 km of the arid Karakum desert) in two months, 24 days less than the previous record, set in 1935. In both circumstances, the aim was to alert the Soviet authorities to the breed's decline and demonstrate its exceptional endurance.

== Yanardag ==
Ýanardag (Turkmen: Ýanardag/Янардаг "Fiery Mountain") is an Akhal-Teke stallion foaled at Kärizow's stud farm in 1991, the year of Turkmenistan's independence from the Soviet Union. Ýanardag is featured in the center of Turkmenistan's coat of arms. Named world champion Akhal-Teke in 1999, Ýanardag was gifted to Saparmyrat Nyýazow by Kärizow. In October 2013, Turkmenistan announced their intention to create a monument in honour of Nyýazow's favourite horse. Ýanardag's golden monument was unveiled in 2014 in Ashgabat.

== Akhal-Teke and Mitochondrial Genomes ==
Research published in June, 2024 in the MDPI journal Genes supports previous studies suggesting a genealogy potentially spanning back 3,000 years.

The study analyzed DNA from the remains of horses unearthed from the Shihuyao tombs (44.09° N, 86.05° E). These were found to date from the Han and Tang Dynasties in Xinjiang, China (approximately 2200 to 1100 years ago). Two high-quality mitochondrial genomes were acquired and analyzed using next-generation sequencing.

A close genetic affinity was observed between the horse of the Tang Dynasty and Akhal-Teke horses according to the primitive horse haplotype G1. Historical evidence suggests that the ancient Silk Road had a vital role in their dissemination. Additionally, the matrilineal history of the Akhal-Teke horse was accessed and suggested that the early domestication of the breed was for military purposes.

The study represents the first identification of the original nucleotide position of the Akhal-Teke in ancient horses from China. A possible dispersal route of Akhal-Teke maternal lineages was also discovered, supported by the history of extensive trade and cultural exchanges along the Silk Road. This suggests that the demand for military horses played an important role in the early domestication of the Akhal-Teke in this particular historical context.

== Personal life ==
Kärizow is married to Yulia Serebryannik and has two children, Daud and Sofia. In 2015, Kärizow was made a Fellow of The Royal Geographical Society .

== The Finnish Ambassador’s Parrot ==
In 1993, Nyýazow gifted then UK Prime Minister John Major with an Akhal-Teke called Maksat. A British diplomat from the Moscow embassy was despatched to arrange quarantine. After many hours delay, the diplomat pleaded with the receptionist on behalf of the “poor Turkmen horses”, who had been “standing up in a railway carriage for four and a half days”, eliciting in response... “the sad tale of the Finnish ambassador’s parrot”, whose fate was never revealed.

== See also ==
- Clade
- Horse breeding
- Turkoman horse
- Ferghana horse
- Nisean horse
- Radio Free Europe/Radio Liberty
