= Absinthe (stallion) =

Dressage horse in the Soviet Union

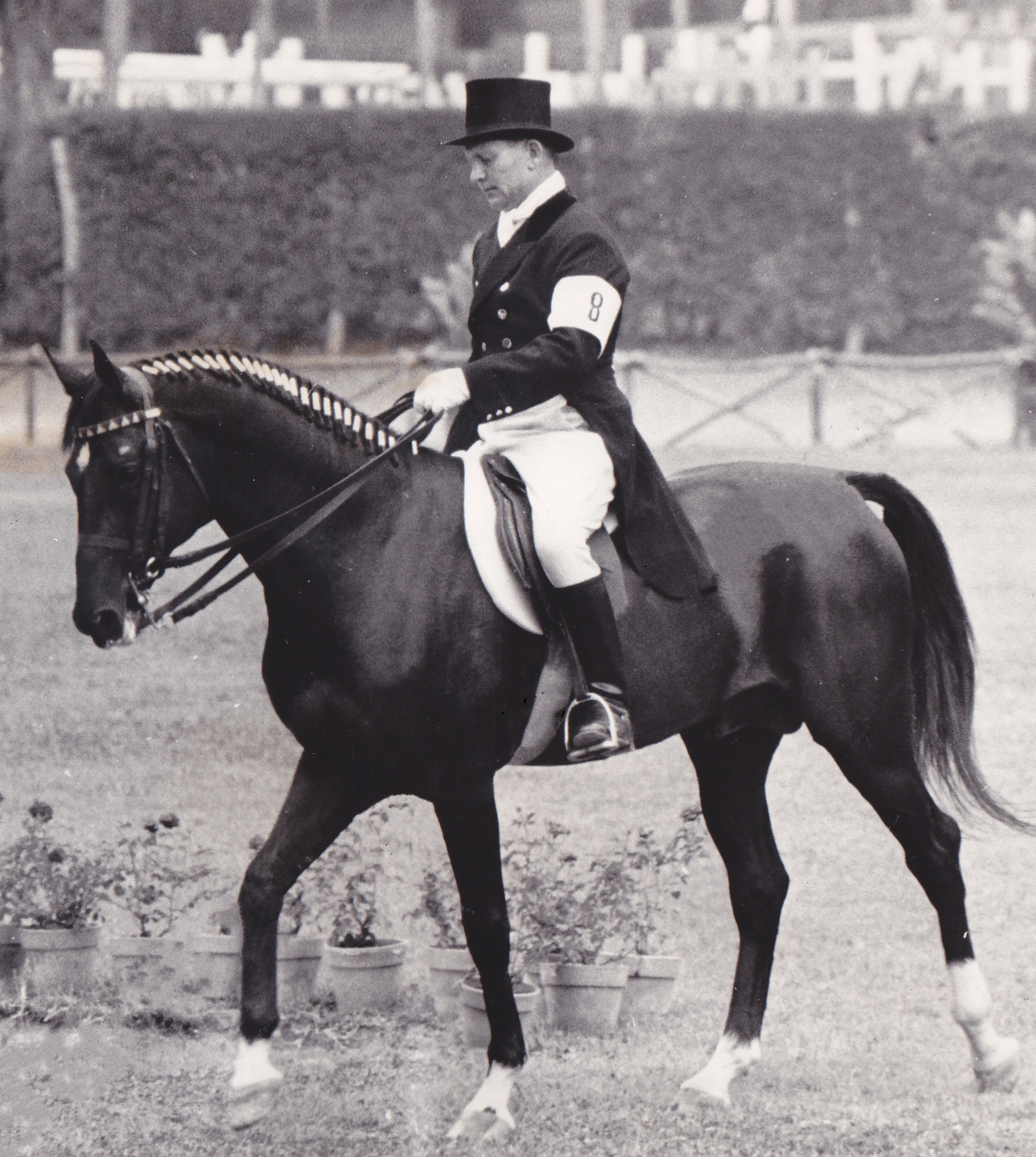
- Sergei Filatov riding Absinthe (Абсент), 1960
- Breed: Akhal-Teke
- Sire: Arab
- Dam: Baccarat
- Sex: Male
- Foaled: 1952
- Died: 1975
- Country: Soviet Union
- Colour: Bay
- Owner: Soviet Army
- Trainer: Viktor Ugryumov
- Rider: Sergei Filatov

Honours
- Olympic Gold Medal (1960)

Absinthe (Russian: Абсент, named "Absent" in some Russian transcriptions) was a black stallion of the Akhal-Teke breed, born in 1952 in Kazakhstan under the Union of Soviet Socialist Republics. Spotted by Marshal Semyon Budyonny, this son of the stallion Arab obtained the first world record for the number of Olympic titles in the dressage discipline, with Soviet horseriders Sergei Filatov and Yvan Kalita.

His performance at the 1960 Summer Olympics in Rome, where he and Filatov won the individual gold medal in dressage, was highly regarded and has since become a benchmark in the discipline. Absinthe's achievements significantly raised the profile of the Akhal-Teke breed and Russian equestrianism.

Regarded as one of the best Olympic horses of the 1960s, Absinthe is also recognized as one of the most famous horses in the USSR. After retiring from competition, he was returned to stud in Kazakhstan by Budyonny and sired more than sixty foals, several of whom went on to join the Soviet dressage team in the 1970s and 1980s.

== Name ==
According to Jean-Louis Gouraud, the horse's original name is "Absinthe" (Абсент), but he is often named "Absent" in Western sources due to a transcription error of the Cyrillic characters from Russian. The Cyrillic characters "Абсент" resemble the Latin characters of the word "Absent." Consequently, the International Federation for Equestrian Sports reference work, Anthology of Equestrian Sports (among other sources), transcribes this horse's name as "Absent" in Latin characters.

The translator of Igor Bobilev's Le grand livre du cheval en Russie (1977), on the other hand, translated the Russian name of this horse as "Absinthe" in French.

== Background ==
Absinthe was born in 1952 at stud N°49 in Taraz (Джамбул). In 1955, the Akhal-Teke herd of horses from the Djamboul stud was transferred to Lugovskoy (village of Lugovoe, now named Kulan).

According to the Kazakh media outlet Vox Populi, Absinthe began a dressage apprenticeship in 1955 at the Almaty riding school, where he was trained by Karim Assenov. At the 1956 Spartakiade of the Peoples of the USSR, Karim Assenov took part in the Petit Prix, finishing 4th with Absinthe. The young stallion performed at the Moscow racecourse that same year. After that, he returned to Kazakhstan.

In 1958, Absinthe was presented at the All-Russian Exhibition of Achievements of National Economy in Moscow, where he was crowned champion of his breed. There, he came to the attention of the trainers of top Soviet horserider Sergei Filatov, as part of a search for an international competition mount. Absinthe, previously trained for show jumping, was transferred to Moscow, where he was trained exclusively for dressage.

Filatov utilized a long pole with a bar angle from the saddle while training Absinthe on the passage, substituting it for the horse's forelimbs to teach the movement.

In the summer of 1959, Filatov and Absinthe travelled to Leipzig for an agricultural exhibition of socialist countries. They then came second in the pre-Olympic qualifying competitions in St. Gallen, one point behind the winner. The pair took part in the European Dressage Championships in Aachen, where they won the gold medal. They caused a sensation at the 1960 Summer Olympics in Rome, where they outperformed all their European and American rivals. Filatov received numerous offers from wealthy Western buyers for Absinthe, all of which he declined. Absinthe took part in a second Olympiad with Filatov but changed horserider for his third Olympiad, during which he was entrusted to Yvan Katila. The official reason was Filatov's addiction to alcohol. However, Sergei Filatov's son, Eugene, suggests political reasons.

Absinthe was retired from competition on Semyon Budyonny's orders in 1969, at the age of 17. He was transferred to the Lugovskoy stud in Kazakhstan to become a full-time sire. According to Russian sources, he remained there until 1974, mainly breeding the Akhal-Teke breed. Journalist Boris Valiev reported that Absinthe died in December 1974 at the age of 23. while the Bulgarian magazine Anteni claimed he died in 1971.

== Description ==
Absinthe was a tall, black-coated Akhal-Teke stallion. He was described as physically very harmonious. His black head is as fine as a Thoroughbred's, and he has a white mark on his forehead. His neckline is arched in the shape of a swan's neck. He also wears four white markings on his lower legs.

>Мягкие длинные линии, лебединая шея, необычайная легкость и грация движений были свойственны [...]. – R. Nasyrov. Long smooth lines, swan neck, extraordinary lightness, and grace of movement were characteristic [...].

However, Absinthe is criticized for having a conformation closer to the Thoroughbred and Trakehner than to that of a typical Akhal-Teke. The Akhal-Teke breed is not usually specialized in dressage, but rather in endurance riding and show jumping. The Arab line, to which Absinthe belongs, is the most famous for dressage.

The stallion is known for a stubborn character and difficult temperament, which was mentioned in the memoirs kept at the Central State Archives of the Republic of Kazakhstan, by K. Sh. Asenov. Filatov's training methods were discovered by the Olympic Games organizers on site, due to communication difficulties. Sergei Filatov discussed his experiences working with Absinthe in his 1962 book, Рим рукоплещет (Rome Applauds):

В работе Абсент был послушен, как ребёнок. После моих трудных занятий с Ингасом тренировать Абсента казалось особенно легко. Правда, он был очень нервный, крайне щепетильный. Наказать его шпорами нечего было и думать. Он очень бы бурно реагировал на такое наказание и долго бы его помнил. И я никогда за всю свою работу с ним не наказал его строго. – С. И. Филатов, Sergei Filatov

Absinthe was as docile as a child in his work. After my difficult sessions with Ingus, training Absinthe seemed particularly easy. It's true, he was very nervous, extremely delicate. Punishing him with spurs was out of the question. He would react very violently to such punishment and remember it for a long time. And I had never, in all my work with him, punished him severely. – Sergei Filatov

== Achievements ==
During his competitive career, Absinthe was regarded by Olympic Games commentators as one of the best sport horses in the world, earning the title "horse of the century" in the official Soviet newspaper Pravda. Olympic equestrian sports, particularly dressage, were dominated at the time by rather heavy European horses, the result of crosses between Thoroughbreds and warmbloods. Russian authors O. Kostikova and M. Ivanov noted that Absinthe was nicknamed the "Black Swan of the East" due to his remarkable lightness.

Absinthe and his rider, Sergei Filatov, achieved significant victories during a period when the Soviet Union's Olympic equestrian dressage team was making considerable progress. In 1952, the team was ranked among the last in the discipline, before progressing to the 1956 edition, and then seeing a Soviet rider-horse pair take the supreme title in 1960. In her thesis on Russian history, Alana Demers places the performances of Absinthe and Filatov in the context of the transformation of horses into ambassadors of Soviet culture, after an era of war and collectivization that saw thousands of horses killed.

=== Rome 1960 Summer Olympics ===
Together with Soviet horse rider Sergei Filatov, Absinthe won the individual dressage gold medal at the 1960 Summer Olympics in Rome. The Marquis de Saint-Cyr, a Swedish rider, was the favorite, having won the dressage gold medal since 1952. Filatov, unbeaten since 1957 in his home country, was the best Soviet horserider present, the other Soviet horserider in the competition being Yvan Kalita. Absinthe is considered the "perfect horse" in his discipline.

The competition consisted of two phases: a qualifying round followed by a final round to determine the winner. Saint Cyr, who went through first, put in a mediocre performance given his abilities. The performance of Absinthe and Filatov, characterized by light riding, elicited many comments from the spectators, who are usually silent during dressage competitions. The pair's performance was praised for its harmony, particularly in maintaining consistent impulsion.

Мой верный друг и партнер ходил безукоризненно, полностью подчиняясь моей воле, и ни разу не позволил себе сделать нечеткого рисунка фигуры или самовольничать. Все было настолько четко, красиво, изящно и грациозно, что и самым придирчивым судьям мы не дали повода снизить нам балл – С. И. Филатов, Sergei Filatov

My faithful friend and partner walked perfectly, obeying my will completely, and not once did he allow himself to make an indistinct figure or to be inaccurate. Everything was so clear, beautiful, elegant, and graceful that we didn't even give the most fastidious judges a reason to lower our score. – Sergei Filatov

Absinthe's passage, piaffe, and change of foot were particularly appreciated by the judges and commentators. His only fault is a tendency to lower his head and open his mouth. The aesthetics of the pair are also commented on: the competition costume being black and white, and Absinthe wearing a black dress with white decorations in his mane and tail, horserider and horse are compared to a work of art in action.

Both horserider and horse were widely applauded as they left the track. Absinthe became the USSR's first Olympic champion horse. In the Russian media, this achievement for equestrian sports in the USSR was compared to the flight of the first man into space.

=== Other Olympic editions ===
The pair went on to win an individual bronze medal at the 1964 Summer Olympics, as well as a team medal. In 1968, Absinthe won a team silver medal at the 1968 Summer Olympics with Yvan Kalita, becoming the record-holding horse in dressage. He finished 4th in the individual competition.

== Pedigree ==
Absinthe's coat is black, which is unusual because his sire and dam are not the same color.

Absinthe's sire is Arab, a gray Akhal-Teke stallion born in 1930. Arab (nicknamed Kazbek in the army) took part in the famous horse raid between Ashgabat and Moscow in 1935, after which he was presented to Semyon Budyonny. For 12 years, he repeatedly won competitions throughout the Soviet Union.

Absinthe's dam is Baccarat, a bay or bay dun Akhal-Teke mare born in 1944.

Pedigree of Absinthe
Sire Arab (1930)	Ag Ishan (1919)	Mele Chep (1901)	Boynow (1885)
Sire Arab (1930)	Ag Ishan (1919)	Mele Chep (1901)	No info
Sire Arab (1930)	Ag Ishan (1919)	Sha Durdy (1915)	Bayram Kor (1910)
Sire Arab (1930)	Ag Ishan (1919)	Sha Durdy (1915)	Ishan
Sire Arab (1930)	Ata Gul (1920)	No info	No info
Sire Arab (1930)	Ata Gul (1920)	No info	No info
Sire Arab (1930)	Ata Gul (1920)	No info	No info
Sire Arab (1930)	Ata Gul (1920)	No info	No info
Dam Baccarat (1944)	Kerkenje (1938)	Kizyl (1930)	Everdy Teleke (1914)
Dam Baccarat (1944)	Kerkenje (1938)	Kizyl (1930)	Bénéfique (1925)
Dam Baccarat (1944)	Kerkenje (1938)	Beauté du Turkménistan	Ata Khojanok
Dam Baccarat (1944)	Kerkenje (1938)	Beauté du Turkménistan	Anna Verdy
Dam Baccarat (1944)	Bayan Dama	Dor Bayram	Kurt bai
Dam Baccarat (1944)	Bayan Dama	Dor Bayram	Cours anglais
Dam Baccarat (1944)	Bayan Dama	Baroque	Bayram Kose
Dam Baccarat (1944)	Bayan Dama	Baroque	Ere

== Legacy ==
During his 23 years of life, Absinthe produced around 68 foals according to Valiev. Most became sport or show horses. His offspring, including Dombai, Abakan, and Arguva, successfully returned to the Soviet dressage team. Abakan was ridden by Yelena Petushkova. With him, she won the 1978 Dressage World Cup and the European Championship the same year; she was preparing for the Olympic Games, but the stallion died in 1980.

Ak-Bulak (or Akbulak, depending on transcriptions), a son of Absinthe born in Kazakhstan and closely resembling him, won the red rosette (the highest title) at the 1978 Soviet National Championship, ridden by the young Latvian horserider Gune Loja.

According to the study by Victor and Jennifer Louis, Absinthe and Filatov's Olympic performance in 1960 remained a sporting landmark throughout the USSR for at least two decades. In 1975, a documentary film directed by Oraz Abishev and entitled Absinthe – the son of Arab and Bakara, was released by Kazakhfilm. The film was shot after Filatov's farewell tour. Absinthe has also inspired various artistic works, including paintings and books, and has become one of the Akhal-Teke breed's ambassadors globally. Absinthe is also considered the most famous horse in the USSR. The 1960 Olympic Games were the first summer Olympics to be televised throughout Europe.

In 1977, a commemorative plaque was placed at the site of Absinthe's burial, near the stables of the Lugovsk stud farm. A few months later, a monument—a copper sculpture forged by E. N. Gilyarov—was erected in the center of the same stud farm. The press of the time commented on the fact that no horse in the world had yet received such an honor, which Boris Valiev analyzed in hindsight as an offense against the horserider Sergei Filatov. According to several commentators, including Tatyana Livanova, author of numerous publications on horses, "the Absinthe represented by this monument is not at all like him".

There are also two bronze sculptures made immediately after the Rome Games by I. I. Kozlovsky, this time depicting Absinthe under Filatov's saddle: one of Absinthe doing the piaffe, and the other of Absinthe in a static position.

== Bibliography ==
- Bobilev, Igor (1977). Le grand livre du cheval en Russie (in French). Translated by De Spengler, Nina. La bibliothèque des Arts.
- Филатов, С. И. (1962). Рим рукоплещет [Rome is applauding] (in Russian). Moscow: Физкультура и спорт.
- Ливанова, Татьяна (2000). Лошадь трёх Олимпиад (in Russian). Конный мир.
- Pellegars-Malhortie, Marie; Capdebarthes, Benoît (2019). Anthologie des sports équestres : Depuis les Jeux Olympiques de 1912 jusqu'à nos jours (in French). Flammarion et FEI. ISBN 978-2-08-146878-8.
- Phillips, Ellen (2015). XVII Olympiad. eBook Partnership. ISBN 978-1-987944-14-3.
