= Akhal-Teke =

Turkmen horse breed

Akhal-Teke Ахал-Теке
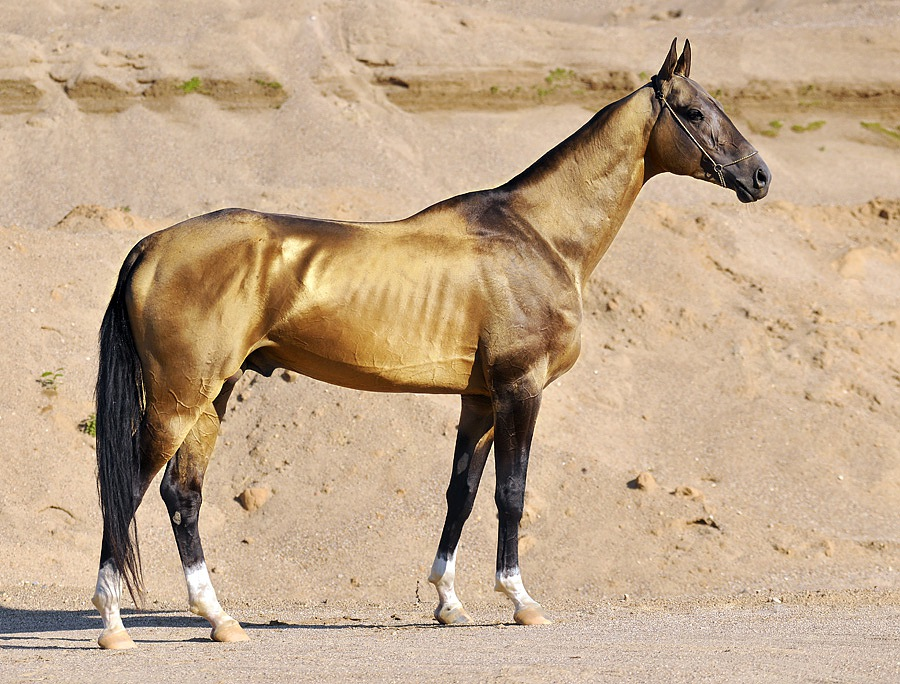
- Country of origin: Turkmenistan
- Standard: Akhal-Teke Association of America; International Association of Akhal-Teke Breeding

Traits
- Weight: 430–500 kg (950–1100 lb)
- Height: 144–160 cm (14.1–15.3 h)
- Distinguishing features: Riding horse bred for endurance; noted for 'metallic' coat of some individuals

The Akhal-Teke (/ˌækəlˈtɛk/ or /ˌækəlˈtɛki/; from Turkmen Ahalteke, [axalˈteke]) is a Turkmen horse breed. They have a reputation for speed and endurance, intelligence, thin manes and a distinctive metallic sheen which led to their nickname, "Golden Horses". These horses are adapted to survive in severe climatic conditions and are thought to be one of the oldest existing horse breeds. There are currently about 6,600 Akhal-Tekes in the world, mostly in Turkmenistan, although they are also found throughout Europe and North America. The first part of their name, "Akhal," is the name of the line of oases along the north slope of the Köpetdag mountains in Turkmenistan, inhabited by the Teke tribe of Turkmens.

There are several theories regarding the original ancestry of the Akhal-Teke, some dating back thousands of years. The Akhal-Teke is probably a descendant of an older breed known as the Turkoman horse, which some claim is the same breed. The tribes of Turkmenistan selectively bred these horses, recording their pedigrees orally. The breed was used in raiding, and in the losing fight against the Russian Empire where it was subsumed into the Empire along with its country. The Turkoman has influenced many other breeds, including modern warmbloods, and recent research confirms that Turkoman stallions made significant contributions to the development of the Thoroughbred. However, there also exists the possibility that all Akhal-Tekes today have a Thoroughbred sire line. The studbook was closed in 1932. The Soviet Union printed the first breed registry in 1941, including over 700 horses.

== History ==
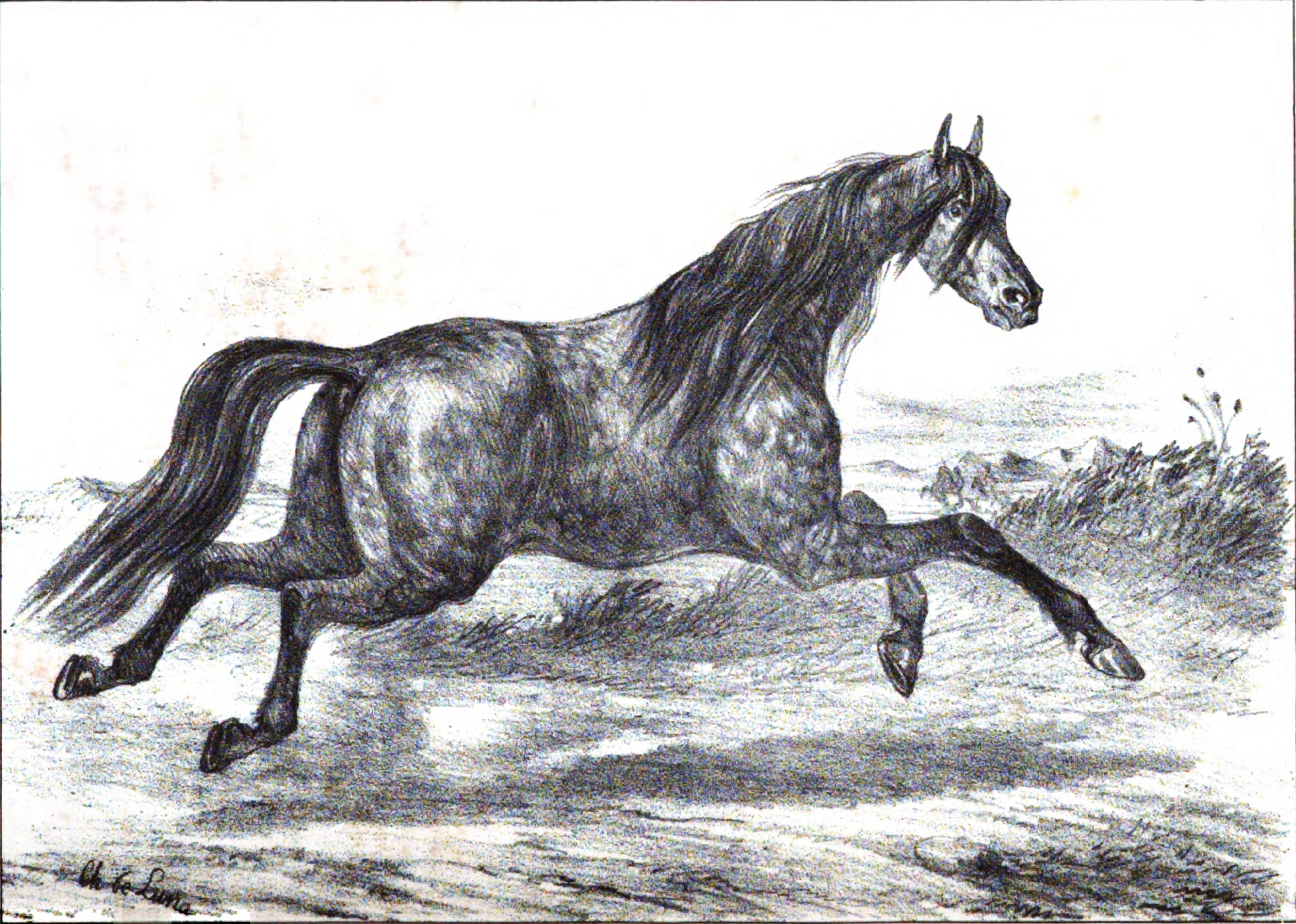
1848 French image of a "Turkmene" horse

The ancestors of the breed may date back to animals living 3,000 years ago, who were known by a number of names. The precise ancestry is difficult to trace, however, because prior to about 1600 AD, horse breeds in the modern sense did not exist; rather, horses were identified by local strain or type.

The breed is very similar to—and possibly the direct descendant of—the Turkoman horse, a breed believed to be extinct, though a related strain may be bred today in Iran. Other breeds or strains with Turkoman roots also include the Yomud, the Goklan, and the Nokhorli. Some historians believe that these are different strains of the same breed. Other ancient strains that may have contributed to the breed, including those named the Massaget and Parthian. There are also claims that Akhal-Teke horse is the descendant of the original Fergana horse which was breed in Fergana valley in 104 BC.

It remains a disputed question whether the Arabian was the ancestor of the Turkoman or was developed out of that breed, but current DNA evidence points to a possible common ancestor for both. A substantial number of Arabian mares were reportedly used to improve the breed in the 14th and 19th century. It is also possible that the so-called "hot blooded" breeds such as the Arabian, Turkoman, Akhal-Teke, and the Barb all developed from a single "oriental horse" predecessor.

Tribal people in what today is Turkmenistan first used the Akhal-Teke for raiding. The horses were their most treasured possession since they were crucial for income and survival. They selectively bred their horses, keeping records of the pedigrees via an oral tradition. Horses were managed and trained in very specific ways. Stallions were tethered next to the tent while mares and foals were free to seek forage. The stallions were covered from head to tail with up to seven layers of felt, which kept their coat short and shiny. Before raids they were put on a sparse diet to prepare them for the long ride through the desert with no water and hardly any feed. The horses were called Argamaks (divine or Sacred Horses) by the Russians and heavenly horses by ancient China, and were cherished by those who valued their speed and stamina in the desert and loyalty to their owner. Han emperors from China waged two expeditions to secure the "heavenly horses". Access to these horse breeds fueled the success in China's future campaign against their nomadic neighbors.

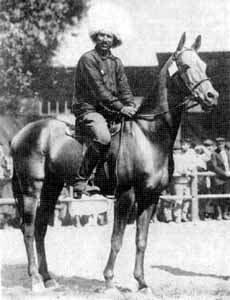
Akhal-Teke stallion Mele Koush, foaled 1909

In 1881, Turkmenistan became part of the Russian Empire. The tribes fought with the tsar, eventually losing. In the process, however, the Russian general Kuropatkin developed a fondness for the horses he had seen while fighting the tribesmen. He founded a breeding farm after the war and renamed the horses, "Akhal-Tekes", after the Teke Turkmen tribe that lived around the Akhal oasis (near Geok Tepe). The Russians closed the studbook in 1932 which included 287 stallions and 468 mares. Stallions are not gelded in Central Asia. The studbook was printed in 1941.

The ancestral Akhal-Teke has had influence on many breeds, possibly including the Thoroughbred; the Byerly Turk, which may have been an Arabian, or a Turkoman Horse, was one of the three major foundation stallions of the breed. Three other stallions thought to be of Turkoman origin, known as the "Lister Turk", the "White Turk", and the "Yellow Turk" were among a number of minor stallions from the orient who contributed to the foundation bloodstock of the Thoroughbred breed. The Trakehner has also been influenced by the Akhal-Teke, most notably by the stallion, Turkmen-Atti, as have the Russian breeds Don, Budyonny, Karabair, and Karabakh.

The breed suffered greatly when the Soviet Union required horses to be slaughtered for meat, even though local Turkmen refused to eat them. At one point only 1,250 horses remained and export from the Soviet Union was banned. The government of Turkmenistan now uses the horses as diplomatic presents as well as auctioning a few to raise money for improved horse breeding programs.

In the early 20th century, crossbreeding between the Thoroughbred and the Akhal-Teke took place, aiming to create a faster long-distance racehorse. The Anglo Akhal-Tekes were not so resilient however, as their Akhal-Teke ancestors, and many died due to the harsh conditions of Central Asia. After the 4,200-kilometre (2,600 mi) endurance race from Ashkabad to Moscow in 1935, when the purebreds finished in much better condition than the part-breds, the studbook management decided to consider all crossbred horses born after 1936 as not purebred. Horses with English Thoroughbred ancestors born prior to that date were allowed to remain inside the studbook (e.g. 044 Tillyakush, grandson of Thoroughbred Burlak; 831 Makh, granddaughter of Thoroughbred Blondelli of the St. Simon line and great-great-granddaughter of Thoroughbred Junak; and line founder 9 Ak Belek, a direct descendant in the male line of the Thoroughbred stallion Fortingbrass, by Fogabal of the Sir Hercules line). Due to this fact, there does not exist any Akhal-Teke today whose ancestry does not contain a Thoroughbred. Since 1973, all foals must be blood typed to be accepted in the stud book in order to protect the integrity of the breed. From 2014 on, a DNA test based on hair follicles is sufficient if the DNA of the parents is on file. A stallion not producing the right type of horse may be removed. Nowadays, artificial insemination is allowed as well as embryo transfer. The surrogate mother, however, needs to be a pureblood Akhal-Teke mare for the foal to be registered in the General Studbook as a pureblood Akhal-Teke. Akhal-Teke horses are bred all over the world. In addition to Turkmenistan there are breeders in Russia and Central Asia, Europe, the US, Uruguay, and Australia.

=== Turkmenistan ===
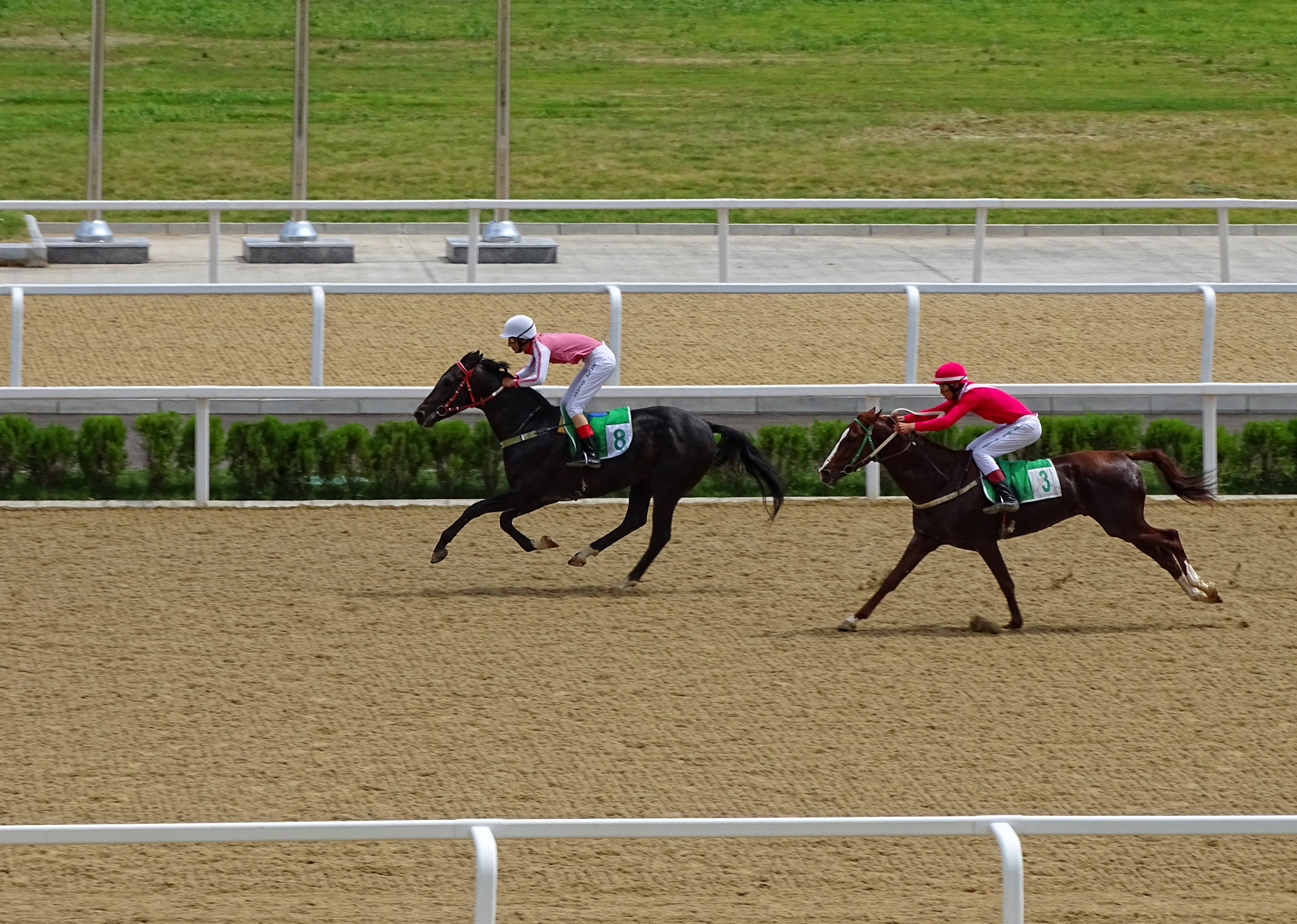
From a race at the national horse-racing stadium in Ashgabat, Turkmenistan. Normally all horses competing here are Akhal-Teke horses.

Turkmenistan has a separate agency, Turkmen Atlary, responsible for the breeding, training and maintenance of Akhal-Teke horses. However, the agency's work has been the focus of criticism from the President of the country, who holds the agency responsible for decreasing numbers of horses and inadequate facilities for their breeding, training and management. At present, Akhal-Teke horses in Turkmenistan are not registered with any other studbook. The main reason for this are allegations of a heavy infusion of Thoroughbred blood into the breed to create faster horses for racing in Turkmenistan. There are estimates that as many as 30% of the horses in the Ashgabat hippodrome were not purebred.

When the first horse minister of newly independent Turkmenistan, Geldi Kärizow, a lifelong advocate for the Akhal-Teke and former chair of the International Association of Akhal-Teke Breeders, began utilizing DNA to establish an Akhal-Teke studbook, he uncovered the pattern of adding in Thoroughbred blood. His decision to go public with this information was viewed as a threat to the profits of the horse-breeding establishment and he fell out of favor with the Turkmenistan government, and in particular, then-President Saparmyrat Nyýazow. He was charged with abuse of office and negligence in 2002, convicted and sentenced to six years in prison. He was ultimately pardoned in October 2007, when Nyýazow died and his successor, Gurbanguly Berdimuhamedow, took control of the country. By 2012, Kärizow's health, which had been poor since his arrest and subsequent imprisonment, had deteriorated to the point he needed to go abroad for medical care, but was initially prevented from leaving the country. By 2015, he was allowed to travel to Moscow for medical care, but family members, including his 14-year-old daughter, were forced to remain behind to "guarantee" his return. In September 2015, the entire family was allowed to leave.

Turkmen Atlary, in its capacity as the administrative arm of the International Akhal-Teke Horse Association, hosts a meeting of the association once or twice a year upon invitation in Ashgabat. Most of the bigger breeding farms and national Akhal Teke associations as well as Akhal Teke owners and representatives of the horse industry from around the world attend. There is a horse racing organization called "Galkynyş". In Ashgabat, the "Akhal-Teke equestrian complex", one of the largest in Central Asia, is a horse-breeding center. A holiday celebrated on the last Sunday in April was renamed from "Akhal-Teke Horse Holiday," to "Turkmen Horse Day."

== Characteristics ==
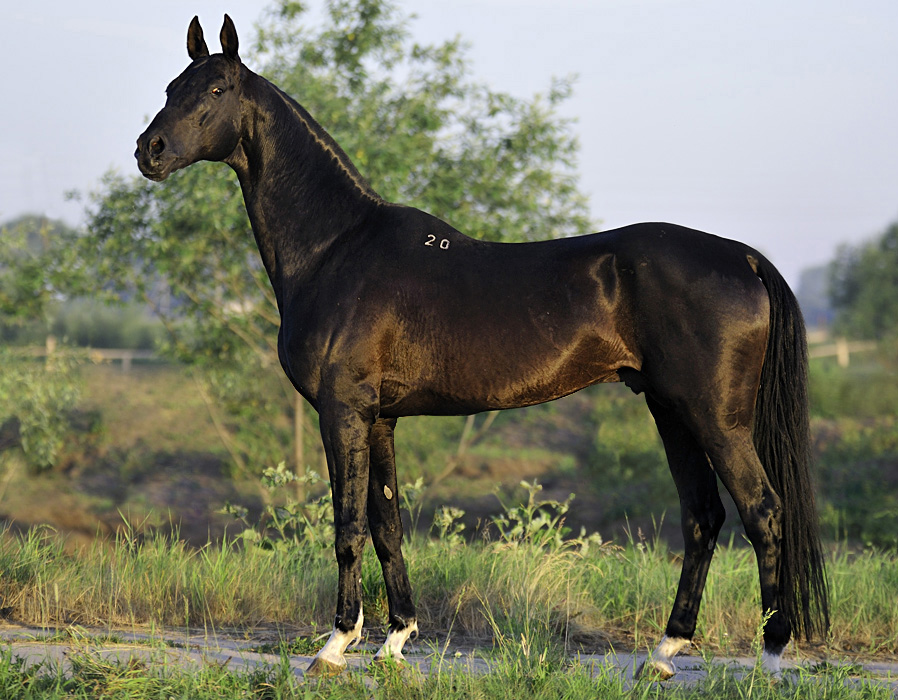
An Akhal-Teke stallion

The Akhal-Teke is of medium size, usually standing some 144 to 160 cm (14 to 16 hands) at the withers, with a weight between 430 and 500 kg (950 and 1,100 lb). Coat colors vary widely: the most frequent are bays (about 40%), duns (about 22%), blacks (about 12%) and chestnuts (about 11%); other colors include grey, cream and yellow. The coat often has a characteristic metallic sheen, which in duns may produce an unusual golden effect; it is sometimes claimed that this provided camouflage in the desert.

The Akhal-Teke has a refined head with predominantly a straight or slightly convex profile, and long ears. It can also have almond-shaped or "hooded" eyes. The mane and tail are usually sparse. The long back is lightly muscled, and is coupled to a flat croup and long, upright neck. The Akhal-Teke possess sloping shoulders and thin skin. The breed is tough and resilient, having adapted to the harshness of Turkmenistan lands, where horses must live without much food or water. This has also made the horses good for sport. The breed is known for its endurance, as shown in 1935 when a group of Turkmen riders rode the 4,000 km (2,500 miles) from Ashgabat to Moscow in 84 days, including a three-day crossing of 378 km (235 mi) of desert without water. The Akhal-Teke is also known for its form and grace as a show jumper.

The quality of the Akhal-Teke horses are determined by the studbook manager. Depending on type, conformation, pedigree, quality of offspring and achievement in sport, the horses are designated as either Elite or Class I or Class II. There are usually 2 annual grading events in Moscow, Russia called the "International Sport Meeting and World Championship", "Heavenly Argamak", and "Golden Akhal-Teke Cup Shael", where breeders present their best horses to a group of judges. At the World Championship, a group of judges evaluates the horses in age and gender categories as well as in various sport disciplines and a halter class.

== Uses ==
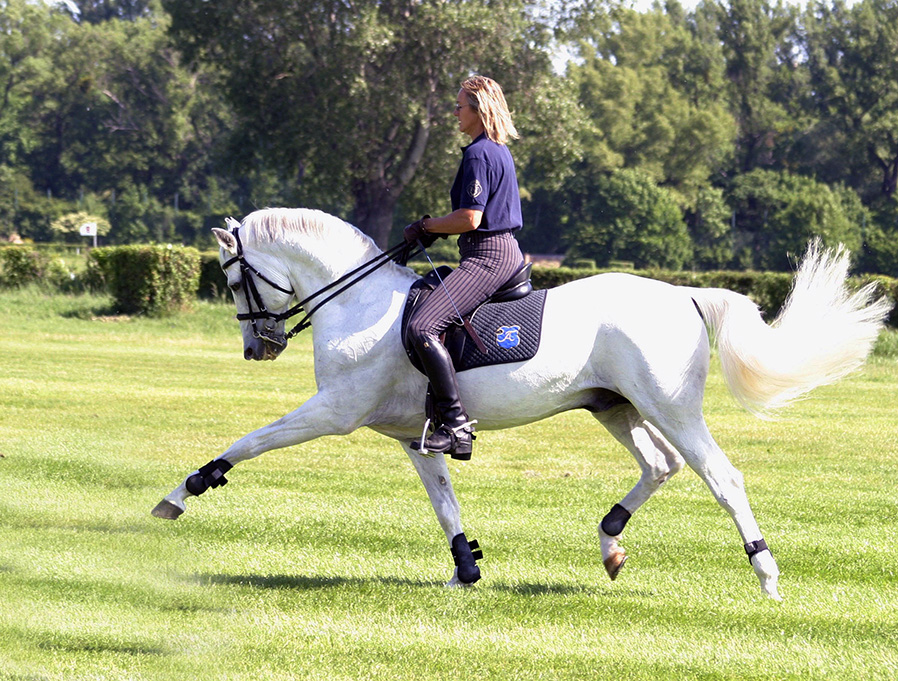
Akhal-Teke under saddle

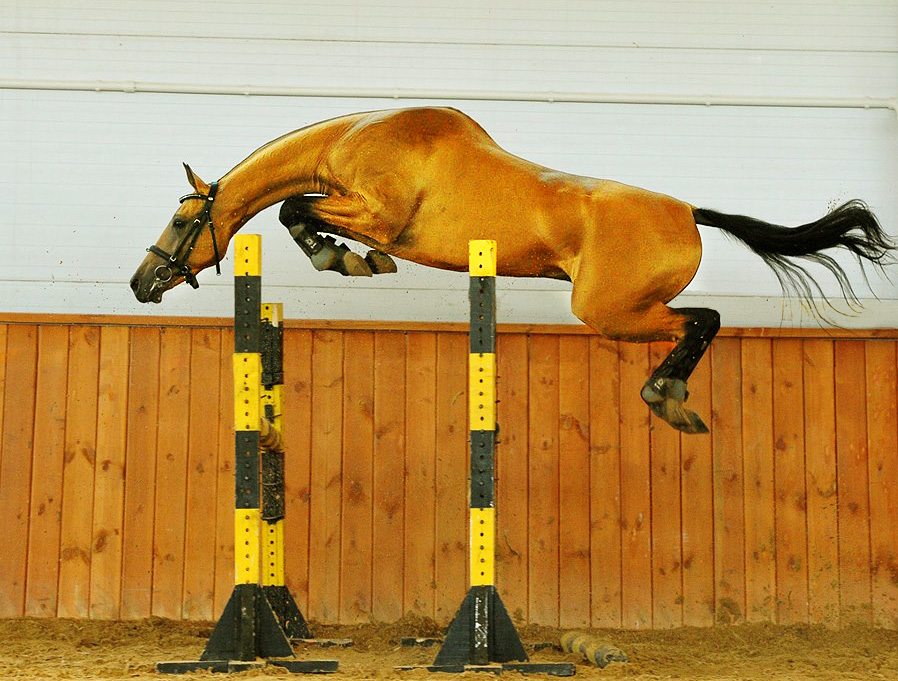
Free jumping Akhal-Teke

The Akhal-Teke, due to its natural athleticism, can be an excellent sport horse. They are good at dressage, show jumping, eventing, racing, and endurance riding. A noted example was the Akhal-Teke stallion Absinthe, who won the Grand Prix de Dressage at the 1960 Summer Olympics in Rome, while being ridden by Sergei Filatov. He went again with Filatov to win the bronze individual medal in Tokyo in the 1964 Summer Olympics, and won the Soviet team gold medal under Ivan Kalita at the 1968 Summer Olympics in Mexico City. However, by today's studbook standards he wouldn't be admitted as Akhal-Teke, owing to the Thoroughbred ancestry of his dam Bakkara.

In 2009, an Akhal-Teke named Almila carried the French poet Laurence Bougault on a trek alone from Isfahan in Iran to Paris by way of Turkey, Greece and Italy. Her trip covered 6,500 kilometres (4,000 mi) in less than six months.

== Genetic diseases ==
There are several genetic diseases of concern to Akhal-Teke breeders. The genetic diversity of the breed is relatively low with an AVK (Ancestor Loss Coefficient) of 30–50%, which raises concerns for dealing with an increase in carriers of these conditions, and even some risk of inbreeding depression. To date, there are no DNA tests for these conditions.

- Naked Foal Syndrome or Hairless Foal Syndrome is believed to be a monogenic autosomal, lethal recessive gene in the Akhal-Teke breed. Foals with this condition have been reported since 1938. Research at the University of Bern in Switzerland is ongoing to develop a DNA test for the condition. It appears to be similar in clinical signs, though not identical to, junctional epidermolysis bullosa (JEB) found in the Belgian horse and another condition of a similar nature identified in the American Saddlebred. The defect causes foals to be born without any hair coat, mane or tail. In some cases, the front teeth are in at birth or molars grow abnormally from normal jaws. Other symptoms include persistent diarrhea, frequent digestive disorders, and laminitis-like, treatment-resistant rotation of the coffin bones in the hooves. Due to the lack of normal skin protection, secondary symptoms include scaly, dry, and inflamed skin, as well as severe cases of sunburn in summer, and frequent pulmonary infections during winter. NFS is always fatal; most foals die within weeks of birth, although some horses have survived up to the age of two years. Early demise is usually caused by digestive problems, whereas older horses need to be humanely euthanized because of severe laminitis-induced pain. Some carriers have been identified, including 943 Arslan, 736 Keymir, 2001 Mariula, or 1054 Gilkuyruk, but the estimated number of unknown cases is likely higher, as several Russian and Turkmenian breeders have acknowledged that NFS foals are often just reported as stillborn or aborted.
- Hereditary cryptorchidism exists within the Akhal-Teke breed and affected stallions can be traced through multiple generations. The influential foundation sire, 2a Boinou was a cryptorchid according to experts of the breed. Other verified cryptorchids include 779 Peren, 1248 Orlan, 971 Khalif, Sayvan, Saburbek, and Garayusup. 1069 Kortik produced a cryptorchid. Unlike many European and North American breed organisations, neither Russia nor Turkmenistan bar cryptorchids from breeding. Cryptorchidism is said to be related to health and behavior problems. Affected horses are more expensive to castrate. There are no studbook regulations related to the use of cryptorchid stallions. Breeders balance the risk of cryptorchidism against propagating other desirable qualities. Some national Akhal Teke associations, however, ban Cryptorchidism from breeding.
- The Akhal-Teke is one of many light riding horse breeds that may be prone to cervical vertebral malformation (CVM), commonly called Wobbler syndrome, and to Degenerative suspensory ligament desmitis (DSLD). These conditions are seen in a number of other breeds, including the Thoroughbred. There is likely a genetic component to Wobbler's, but the mechanism has not been clearly identified. There also is a possible connection to Osteochondritis dissecans (OCD).

== Commemorations ==
There are monuments to the Akhal-Teke breed in many Turkmenistan cities. The largest number of sculptures is located in Ashgabat. Akhal-Tekes are represented in the official emblem and banknotes of Turkmenistan, as well as on stamps of Turkmenistan and other countries.

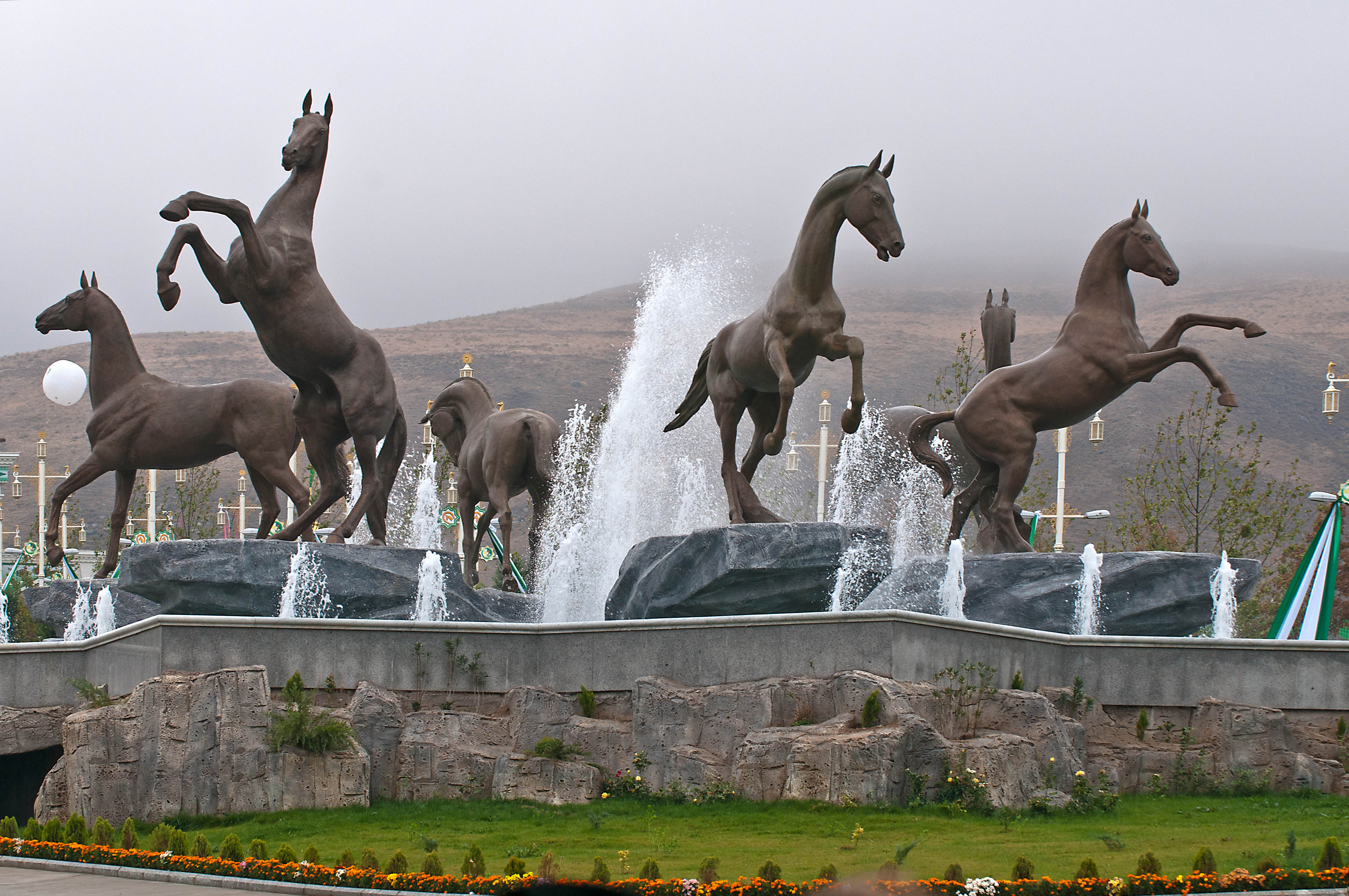
Monument in International Equestrian Sports Complex

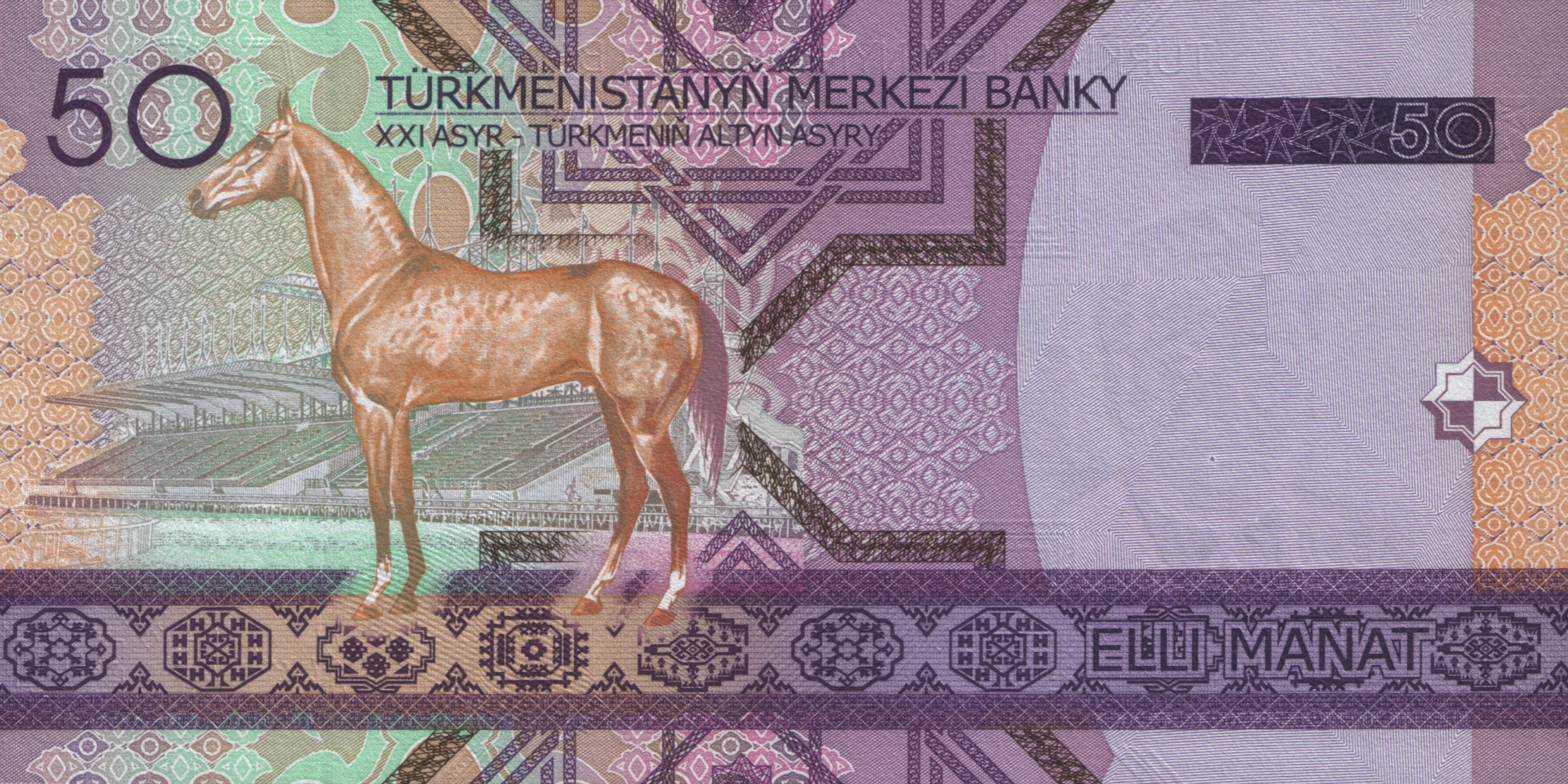
Bank note: Turkmen manat

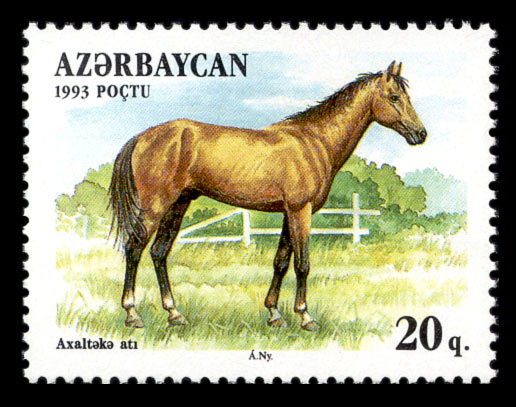
Azerbaijan (1993)

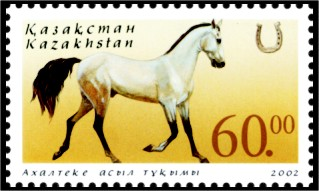
Kazakhstan (2002)

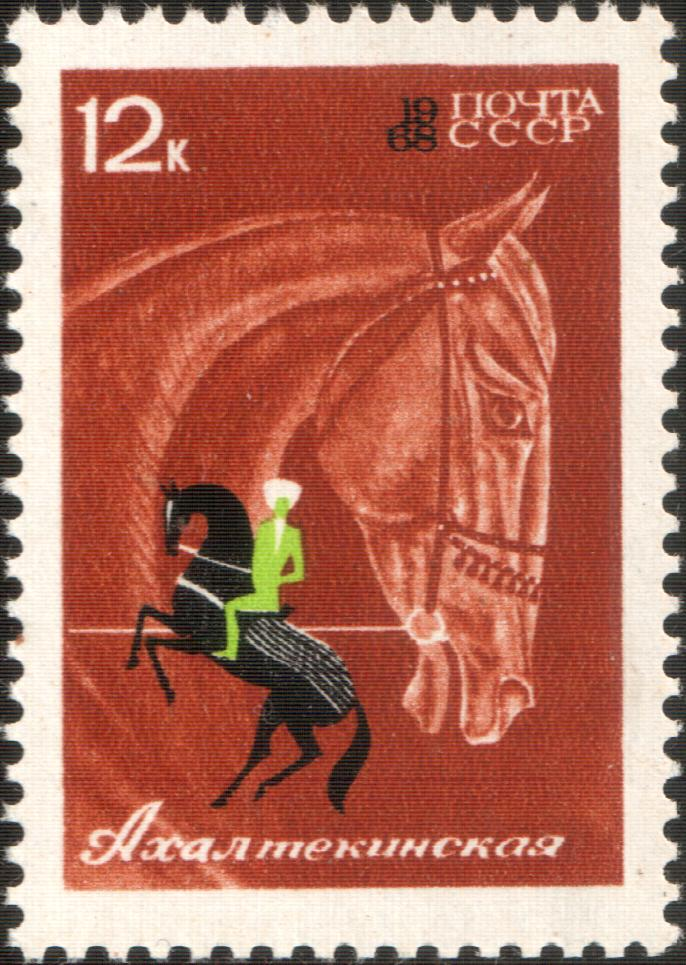
USSR (1968)

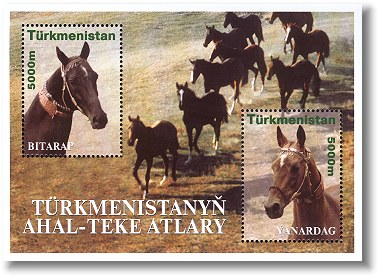
Turkmenistan (2001): Miniature sheet

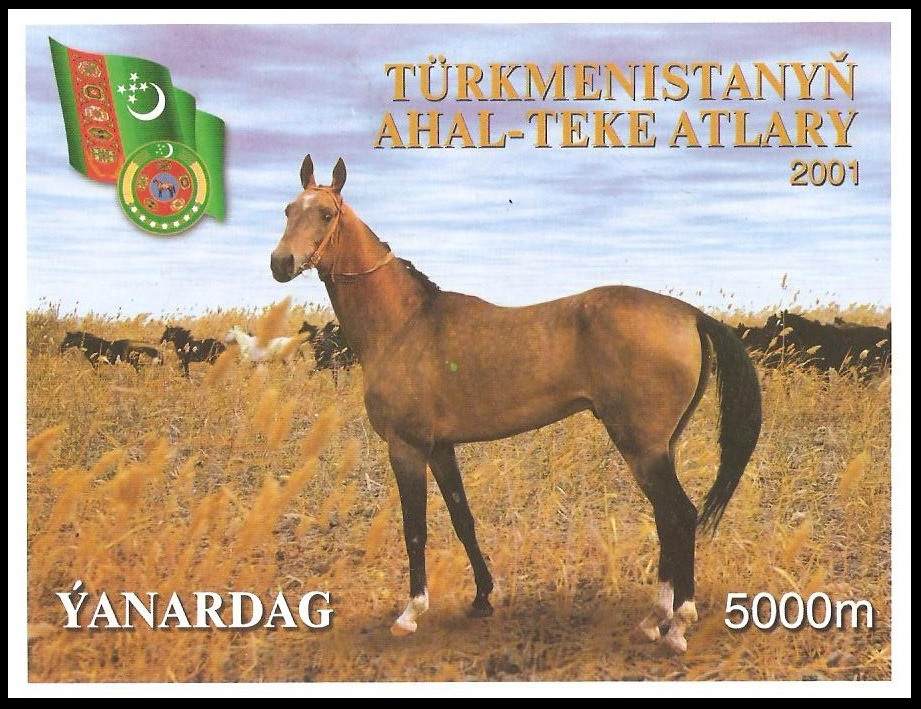
Turkmenistan (2001): Miniature sheet (Yanardag)

Emblem of Turkmenistan with Yanardag

Art of Akhal-Teke horse breeding and traditions of horses' decoration were recognized as part of the Intangible Cultural Heritage of Humanity by UNESCO. This recognition occurred during the 18th session of the Intergovernmental Committee for the Safeguarding of Intangible Cultural Heritage in 2023. The nomination celebrates the unique cultural significance of these practices, deeply rooted in Turkmenistan's heritage.

== See also ==
- Turkoman horse
- Absinthe (stallion)
