= Naked foal syndrome =

Genetic disorder in Akhal-Teke horses

Naked foal syndrome (NFS) is a genetic disorder specific to the Akhal-Teke horse breed. A rare genodermatosis, it is characterized by almost complete hairlessness and mild ichthyosis. The condition is inherited as a monogenic autosomal recessive trait, and affected horses typically die between a few weeks and three years of age. The exact cause of death in NFS-affected horses is not clear.

== Description ==
Naked foal syndrome is a rare, genetic disorder specific to the Akhal-Teke breed and recognized among breeders. It is characterized by foals being born without hair and often dying within days to months after birth. While the exact cause of these early deaths is unknown, some hairless foals have survived up to 2.5 years. Records of hairless Akhal-Teke foals date back to 1938, and since then, the number of cases has steadily increased.

The first scientific description of NFS was provided by researchers who identified a specific genetic variant associated with the syndrome. Through positional mapping and whole genome sequencing, the researchers mapped the disease-causing variant to two segments on chromosomes 7 and 27 in the equine genome. Further analysis revealed a single nonsynonymous genetic variant on the chromosome 7 segment that was perfectly associated with NFS.

This variant, known as ST14:c.388G>T, leads to a truncation of over 80% of the open reading frame of the ST14 gene (p.Glu130*), resulting in partial nonsense-mediated decay of the mutant transcript. Genetic variants in the human ST14 gene are responsible for autosomal recessive congenital ichthyosis 11, a similar condition in humans. The ST14 gene, which encodes a type II serine protease known as matriptase, is implicated in epithelial and epidermal development. In humans and mice, ST14 variants can cause autosomal recessive congenital ichthyosis, leading to abnormalities in hair, teeth, and skin. The phenotype of NFS-affected horses resembles these human and mouse conditions, with severe alopecia and skin abnormalities. However, NFS foals have a more severe alopecia compared to human patients, and the ichthyosis is less pronounced. The exact reason for the short life expectancy of NFS-affected foals is unclear. The identification of the ST14:c.388G>T variant in NFS-affected horses suggests that these animals could serve as a valuable large animal model for studying this known human genodermatosis. The discovery of this variant also enables genetic testing to prevent the unintentional breeding of NFS-affected foals.

=== Clinical and pathological phenotype ===
Naked foal syndrome in Akhal-Teke horses is characterized by hairlessness and other dermatological abnormalities. Affected foals typically exhibit sparse, thin body hairs, alopecia in the limbs with increased hair density towards the distal ends, and may lack mane and tail hairs. Whiskers are sparse, curly, and short, while eyelashes are often missing. Skin abnormalities include dryness, scaliness (xerosis cutis), and the presence of scars and erosive lesions due to the lack of a protective hair coat. NFS-affected horses may also experience increased tear flow (epiphora). Case studies have shown growth delays and size differences compared to non-affected horses. Histopathological examinations reveal abnormalities in the hair follicles, with shortened anagen follicles and distorted infundibula filled with excessive keratin and sebum, indicating a follicular dysplasia. Some NFS cases present with other abnormalities, such as hydrocephalus, heart defects, and altered lymphoid organs, suggesting a broader impact on development and immunity.

== Prevalence ==
The prevalence of the variant c.388G>T associated with naked foal syndrome was observed in a study involving 191 Akhal-Teke horses. Among these, 5 affected horses were found to be homozygous for the variant, while 10 obligate carriers were heterozygous. Testing revealed that 165 horses were homozygous for the reference sequence, and 26 were heterozygous for c.388G>T. The variant was not detected in a sample of 400 horses from other breeds.

== See also ==
- Junctional epidermolysis bullosa
- Canine follicular dysplasia
- Inbreeding depression
