= Sergei Filatov =

Soviet equestrian (1926–1997)

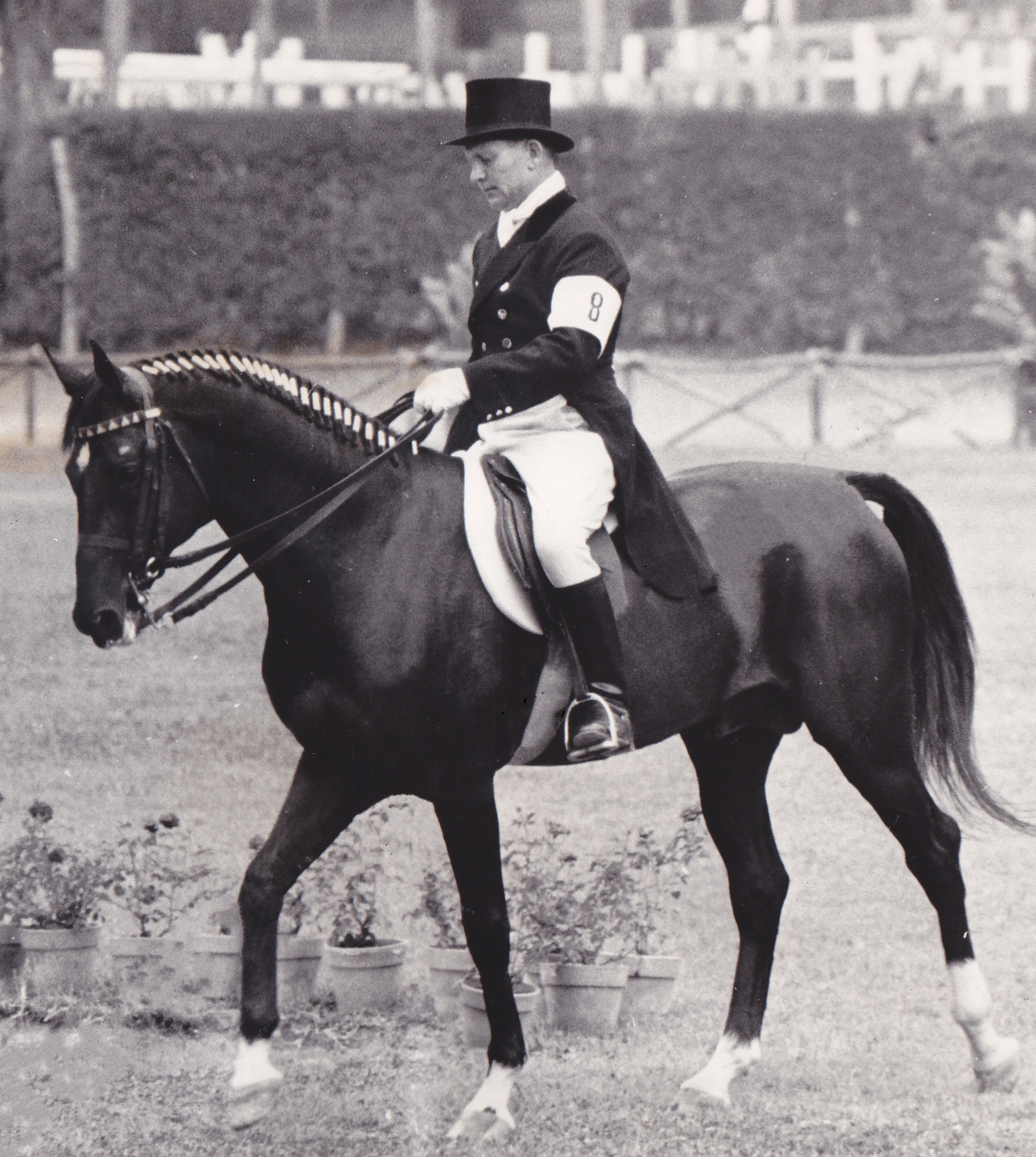
- Sergei Filatov on Absent at the 1960 Olympics

Personal information
- Born: Sergei Ivanovich Filatov; 25 September 1926 Lysyye Gory, Tambov Governorate, RSFSR, USSR
- Died: 3 April 1997 (aged 70) Moscow, Russia
- Height: 1.72 m (5 ft 8 in)
- Weight: 81 kg (179 lb)

Sport
- Sport: Horse riding
- Club: Soviet Army, Moscow
Medal record
Representing the Soviet Union
Olympic Games
| Gold medal – first place | 1960 Rome | Individual dressage |
| Bronze medal – third place | 1964 Tokyo | Individual dressage |
| Bronze medal – third place | 1964 Tokyo | Team dressage |

Sergei Ivanovich Filatov (Russian: Серге́й Иванович Филатов, 25 September 1926 – 3 April 1997) was a Soviet equestrian who competed in the mixed dressage at the 1956, 1960 and 1964 Olympics. He won individual gold in 1960 and two bronze medals in 1964, individual and with the Soviet team. His 1960 gold was the first achievement of this rank for a Soviet rider.

Filatov started training in competitive horse riding at the age of 27, while serving in the Soviet Army. His commander, marshal Semyon Budyonny was a keen horse rider and breeder. He was ashamed by the performance of the Soviet team at the 1952 Olympics and established his own riding school, which consisted of soldiers that he personally selected from his regiments, such as Filatov. He won his first national title in 1954, after less than a year of training, which followed by seven consecutive victories in 1957–1963. At the 1956 Olympics he was 11th individually and fourth with the Soviet team. In 1958, he changed his horse to the black Akhal-Teke stallion Absent, which resulted in a series of domestic and international victories. Filatov retired after failing to qualify for the 1968 Olympics and later opened his personal riding school in Moscow.

== See also ==
- Absinthe (stallion)
