= Ýanardag =

Akhal-Teke stallion

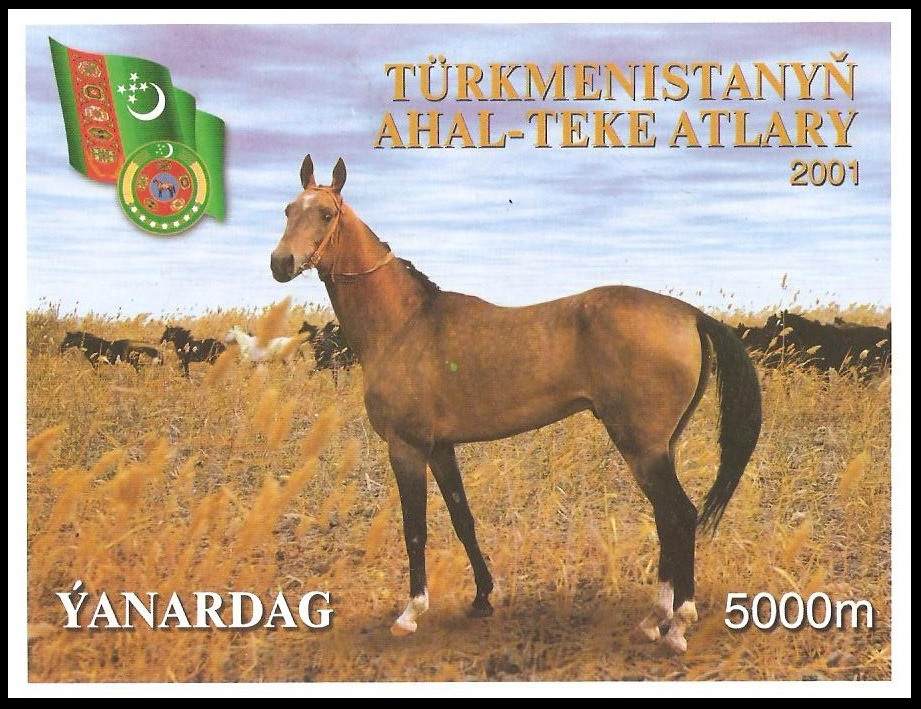
- Breed: Akhal-Teke
- Sire: 1084 Yalkymly
- Dam: 2158 Dobaraly
- Sex: Stallion
- Foaled: 1991
- Country: Turkmenistan
- Owner: Saparmyrat Nyýazow

Record
- 31:26-?-?

Ýanardag is depicted on the coat of arms of Turkmenistan

Ýanardag (Turkmen: Ýanardag/Янардаг "Fiery Mountain", born 1991) is an Akhal-Teke stallion owned by the former President of Turkmenistan, Saparmyrat Nyýazow. The stallion is depicted on the coat of arms of Turkmenistan, on a 2001 miniature sheet Turkmenistan postage stamp, and in other Turkmen national representations, and he is also often featured in newspaper and magazine articles.

== Biography and representations ==
Ýanardag is an Akhal-Teke horse bred by Geldi Kärizow, and foaled in Turkmenistan in 1991, the year of Turkmenistan's independence from the Soviet Union. Ýanardag was named world champion of the breed in 1999 in Moscow, and was subsequently acquired by Saparmyrat Nyýazow, who was President of Turkmenistan 1990–2006.

He is described on the official Turkmenistan webpage on Akhalteke horses as having a "unique golden-dun colour, characteristic for all Akhalteke horses". According to the Akhal-Teke Association of America, "golden dun", called Bulanaya, is the color buckskin, produced by the cream gene, sometimes overlaid with sooty shading. While bulanaya is the Russian word for the color called buckskin in the USA, bulanaya is sometimes translated "dun" when using an outdated British English term for diluted colors. There are no Akhal-Tekes registered as savrasaya (the Russian word for the dun color) in the Russian stud books.

A lifelike image of Ýanardag, in a sphere of blue, has been the central figure of the coat of arms of Turkmenistan since 2003. His image is also on a 2001 Turkmenistan postage stamp, and on the reverse of the 2005 50-manat note. In 2014 a monument to Ýanardag was completed and unveiled in Turkmenistan's capital city of Ashgabat.
