= Olivier Soutet =

French linguist

Olivier Soutet (born 1 November 1951 in Paris) is a French linguist. A specialist of historical grammar of the French language, he was a professor at the université Paris-Sorbonne and dean of the Faculty of Letters of the Institut catholique de Paris.

== Publications ==
- 1977: La littérature française du XVI. Paris: PUF.
- 1980: La littérature française de la Renaissance. Paris: PUF. (reprinted in 1987 and 1994)
- 1989: La syntaxe du français. Paris: PUF. (reprinted in 1993, 1998, 2005 and 2009)
- 1990: La concession en français des origines au XVI. Problèmes généraux. Les tours prépositionnels. Genève: Droz.
- 1992: La concession dans la phrase complexe en français des origines au XVI. Genève: Librairie Droz.
- 1992: Etudes d'ancien et de moyen français. Paris: PUF.
- 1995: Linguistique. Quadrige. Paris: PUF. (reprinted in 1997, 2001 and 2005)
- 1998: (in Italian) Manuele di linguistica, Bologna: il Mulino
- 2000: Le subjonctif français. Paris: Ophrys.
- 2004: Fransk litteratur under Renässanssen. Stockholm: Alhambra Förlag.
