= Genes (journal) =

- Discipline: Genetics
- Language: English
- Edited by: J. Peter W. Young

Publication details
- History: 2010-present
- Publisher: MDPI
- Frequency: Monthly
- Open access: Yes
- License: CC-BY
- Impact factor: 4.141 (2021)

Standard abbreviations
- ISO 4: Genes

Indexing
- CODEN: GENEG9
- ISSN: 2073-4425

Links
- Journal homepage

Genes is a quarterly peer-reviewed open access scientific journal that is published by MDPI. The editor-in-chief is J. Peter W. Young (University of York). It covers all topics related to genes, genetics, and genomics.

== Abstracting and indexing ==
The journal is abstracted and indexed in:

- Chemical Abstracts
- EBSCOhost
- EMBASE
- Science Citation Index Expanded
- Scopus
