= Pfalz-Ardenner =

German breed of horse

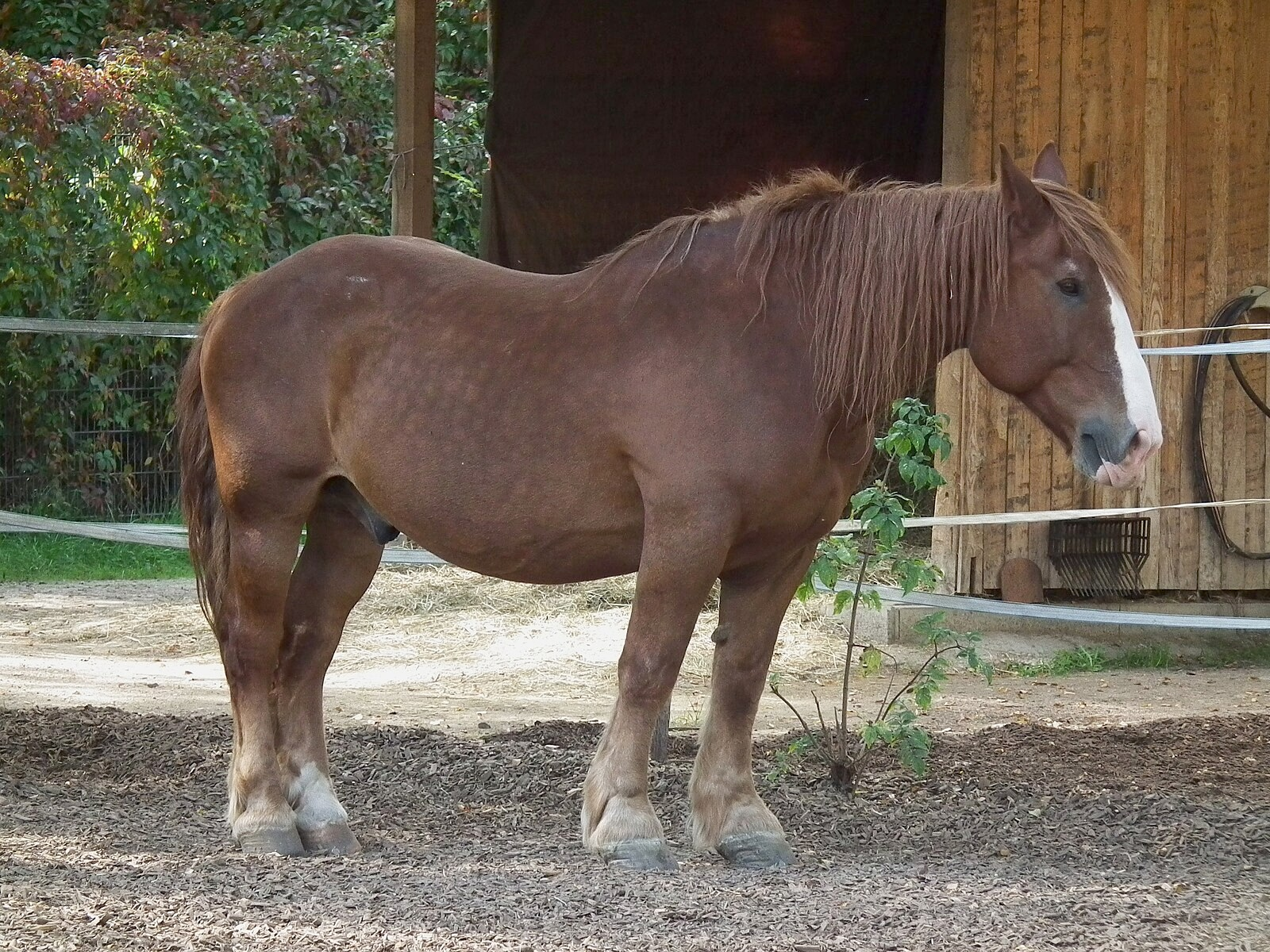
- In the Tiergarten Worms, in Worms
- Conservation status: GEH (2000): a few individuals only; FAO (2007): critical; DAD-IS (2024): at risk/critical
- Other names: Pfalz Ardenner; Pfalz Ardenner Kaltblut; Pfalz-Ardenner Kaltblut; Pfälzer Ardenner
- Country of origin: Germany
- Distribution: Rhineland-Palatinate
- Use: agriculture, forestry

Traits
- Height: 152–162 cm; Male: average 160 cm; Female: average 157 cm
- Colour: any

The Pfalz-Ardenner or Pfalz Ardenner Kaltblut is a German breed of heavy draught horse. As the name suggests, it originates in the Pfalz or Rhineland-Palatinate, and derives from the Ardennais horses of Belgium, France and Luxembourg. A stud-book was started in 1906.

In the twenty-first century it is an endangered breed. In 2022 the breeding stock consisted of 27 brood-mares and 8 stallions.

== History ==
The Pfalz-Ardenner is a relatively young breed, derived from the Ardennais, as its name suggests.

While the origins of the Ardennais can be traced back to the 17th century, the German breed is more specifically derived from various crosses between French and Belgian draft horses, undertaken at the beginning of the 20th century in southwest Germany.

French Ardennais horses were the most important influence, but some Comtois were also crossed with Rhineland and Bavarian draft horses. Then, in 1896, a breeding cooperative was formed and ten years later, in 1906, a stud-book was established based on imports of Ardennais horses from Alsace and Lorraine in France, with a small contribution of Bavarian horses.

The Pfalz-Ardenner studbook has always been very open, accepting a large number of horses in crossbreeding. With the motorization of farming, the breed was threatened with extinction in the 1970s.

Until the 2010s, the Pfalz-Ardenner was never considered a breed in its own right. Since then, a handful of breeders in the Rhineland-Palatinate-Saarland region have dedicated themselves to its preservation.

In 2022 the breeding stock consisted of 27 brood-mares and 8 stallions. Five foals were registered in that year.

The breed is listed as endangered by DAD-IS (2018) and it is on the Red List of endangered indigenous breeds in Germany (Rote Liste der bedrohten einheimischen Nutztierrassen). Locally it is classified as an "endangered population" (Phänotypische Erhaltungspopulation: vom Aussterben bedroht) because there are less than 50 individuals.

Despite these very low numbers, the situation of the Pfalz-Ardenner is actively monitored in Germany, with H. Haring stating in 2005 that "the conservation of this breed group (German draft horses) can be considered secured".

Taking into account crossbreeds, the Pfalz-Ardenner breeding population in the cradle of breeding in 2015 was about 60 mares and 8 stallions. This breed is also eligible for financial aid for the preservation of endangered breeds (2015).

== Characteristics ==
CAB International and the Delachaux guide indicate an average height of 1.52 m to 1.62 m, which is according to the breed's studbook regulations. DAD-IS gives an average height of 1.57 m for females and 1.60 m for males. The weight is between 700 and 800 kg, making it a medium draught horse.

The head is rather small, with a broad forehead and short ears. The chest is broad and the croup is muscular. The body should be of medium thickness for a draft horse, with a deep girth. The feet should be sturdy.

All colors are permitted, but the most common, according to the Delachaux guide, are bay, chestnut, black, gray, and roan. However, roan is not listed among the coats found in the breed's studbook (2015).

=== Selection ===
Since 2008, the studbook has officially accepted Ardennais, Breton, Comtois, South German, Rhineland, and Swedish Ardennais horses for crossbreeding, provided the other parent is a registered Pfalz-Ardenner.

If the crossbreed horse meets the breeding objectives, then it is registered in the studbook of its breed. The goal is to maintain the selection of a versatile, medium-weight draft horse. Subjects must be able to work in all three gaits and are tested for pulling ability, among other things.

Selection is based on character, favoring horses that are gentle, versatile, well-balanced, and suitable for recreational activities.

Stallions can be approved for breeding at the age of three, subject to evaluation. The same applies to mares. Horses belonging to the breed have a suffix to their name that is specific to the breeding farm of origin.

== Use ==
In the past, the breed was valued for its versatility. The breed was originally intended for use in agriculture and as a skidding horse, but motorization has greatly reduced these activities.

Combined driving, skidding (and other agricultural and forestry work), and pleasure riding are the uses of the Pfalz-Ardenner today. It can still be used in heavy traction work, but it is also bred for meat production.
