= Estonian horse =

Estonian horse may refer to:

- The Estonian Draft, an Estonian breed of draught horse
- The Estonian Native, an Estonian breed of small horse
- The Tori horse, an Estonian breed of harness horse
