= Arved Toots =

Estonian agronomist

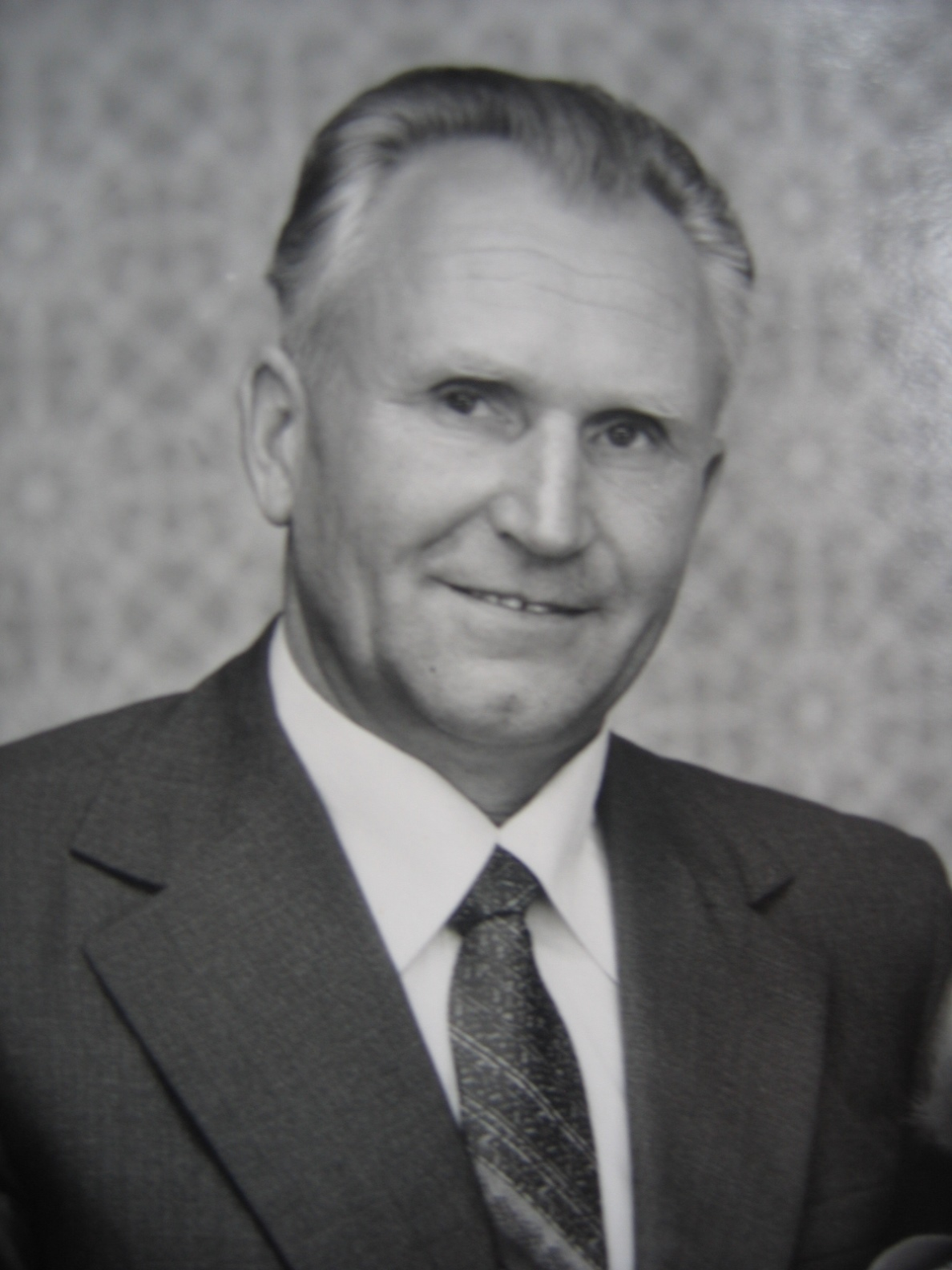
- Born: 17 September 1930; Aravete, Estonia
- Died: 18 January 1992 (aged 61); Kuressaare, Estonia
- Education: Jäneda State Farm Technical School; Jõgeva Plant Breeding Institute
- Occupations: Agronomist, horse breeder
- Years active: 1950–1992

Arved Toots (17 September 1930 – 18 January 1992) was an Estonian agronomist and breeder of Tori horses.

== Early life and career ==
Arved Toots was born near Aravete in Kantküla, Albu Parish, into a farming family. He received his basic education at the Aravete school. From 1946 to 1949 he studied at the Jäneda Agricultural School, graduating as an agronomist. He began his career in 1949 as an agronomist at the machine-tractor station in Ambla. In 1955 he moved to be an agronomist at the collective farm "Murrang" (renamed in 1958 as the Aravete collective farm). In February 1970 he became the department head at the Aravete collective farm, a position he held until his retirement on 1 January 1992. He was also head of the Aravete Tori horse farm from 1955 to 1992 as well as being a long-term member of the board of the Horse Breeding Council in Estonia.

== Tori horse breeder ==
Horse breeding began in Aravete during the first years after the war and on 20 October 1949, the farm was recognized as an Estonian Draft breeding farm. Arved Toots took over the management of the farm in 1955 and soon changed the breeding direction: from this point on Aravete bred Tori horses, "dark chestnut horses of the Sammur line with a beautiful round croup". Tootsi's goal was to make the Tori horse "more slender, stronger-boned, taller and stronger, so that it would also be suitable for many sports". In other words, "Aravete wanted to breed the Tori as a very elegant high level horse, without any external or internal flaws and shortcomings."

As a result of his long-term intensive work Toots succeeded in making Aravete a Tori horse breeding center: in the mid-1970s, Aravete farm was declared the best in Estonia. "In the last four years, the Aravete breeding farm has received the highest score in the inter horse breeding farm competition and achieved the fame of the best horse breeding farm in the republic."

Aravete was named the best Tori horse breeding farm in 1979 and subsequent years with a score of 99 points (33 mares were mated, 23 foals were born, 13 horses were sold). At that time there were six stables in the Aravete breeding farm. "The yards of the stables are paved, the surroundings are clean and tidy. Sheds for vehicles, horse fixing stands and paddocks for stallions and young horses have been built next to the stables. The stables are regularly disinfected and whitened every year. Stables are always kept clean and tidy."

The best horses on the Aravete breeding farm were chestnut and dark chestnut, their white blaze was long and narrow and their white socks short. One of the farm's top horses was the elite class stallion Heik 11607 T (mother Horvi and father Hiko), born on February 7, 1983, whose photo adorns the cover of the November 1986 "Socialist Agriculture".

The horses brought significant revenue to the Aravete collective farm, as there was no shortage of buyers. "The two-year-old stallion Ullar was sold at auction for 7600 rubles. This year, 18 horses have been sold, which brought in almost 100,000 rubles," according to a description of Aravete in a newspaper in the autumn of 1984. "There is certainly a market for our horses, it's a matter of supplying enough horses to meet the high demand." said Toots. This was not an exceptional year, as this high level of sales success had been achieved continuously since the 1970s. "Due to the sale of breeding horses, Aravete has a much higher profitability from horse breeding than many other farms. In 1977, the profitability of breeding young horses was 119.8%."

Aravete horses were sold to various regions of the Soviet Union as well as to foreign countries: "Horses have also been taken from here for export to the West Germany, Italy, etc. Aravete horses have been purchased for several circuses and racecourses in our country, and they have been and will be presented at international auctions in the future." In 1975, for example, the Aravete horses were sold at the Moscow International Horse Auction. Sales success was ensured by high quality: Aravete's sales horses were mainly in the elite class I category. Buyers especially appreciated that the horses were well trained and impeccably cared for. Good training also allowed horses to be used in agriculture, as well as for weddings and rides on Shrove Tuesdays.

In the early 1990s, Arved Toots kept the Aravete horse farm performing at the highest level despite his deteriorating health. According to the results of the evaluation of breeding farms in 1990, Aravete was in sixth place, owing to the farm's non-participation in competitions and exhibitions. In other respects, it was equal to the leading horse farm in Tori. After Toots' death in January 1992, the Aravete breeding farm began to fade and closed down some years later.

== In culture ==
In the summer of 1982, young actors of the XI graduating class of the Drama School, including Angelina Semjonova, Märt Visnapuu, Margus Tabor, Toomas Urb and others, borrowed horses from Aravete and undertook a three-week tour of almost 600 kilometers in Central and Southern Estonia with horse-drawn carriages. During this old traveling theater-style journey, an original parody of a variety show was performed by the group for the amusement of many in several towns.

Aravete's horses were also used by Tallinnfilm because they were so well-trained.

Kadri Mälk, an internationally renowned Estonian jewelry artist and professor of the Estonian Academy of Arts, has used dark chestnut horsehair from Aravete horses in several of her jewelry pieces, such as the necklace "Everything forgiven" (2016), the brooches "Presence" (2017) and "Mountains recognize one another" (2017) and the ring "Ave Maria" (2018).

== Recognition and honours ==
Arved Toots received honorary diplomas and awards in recognition of his achievements in the field of horse breeding as well as for performance by Aravete horses in horse shows and competitions.

Beginning in 1960 he entered his Aravete horses in competition many times in the Exhibition of Achievements of National Economy in Moscow (abbreviation ВДНХ СССР), winning 2 gold, 1 silver and 2 bronze medals.

== Literature ==
- Arved Toots – Aravete kolhoosi agronoom. Võitlev Sõna, 30.09.1969
- Rein Kaur. Hobusekasvatus tootmisharuna. Sotsialistlik Põllumajandus, no. 24, 1978
- Rein Kaur. Püsiva tööga teenitud tunnustus. Võitlev Sõna, 30.01.1979
- Peeter Sauter. Hiilgav Vedelteater püsis sadulas. Teater. Muusika. Kino, no. 8, 1982
- Anne Rosenberg. Kuidas elavad hobused? Võitlev Sõna, 3.11.1984
- Kui ilus hobune! Sotsialistlik Põllumajandus, no. 22, 1986
- Eesti põllumajandus XX sajandil. Part II, Tallinn 2007
- Eesti põllumajanduse edendajaid. Biograafiline leksikon. Tallinn, 2008
- Tori hobusekasvandus 160. Eesti Põllumajandusmuuseum, 2017
- Bonnie Lou Hendricks. International Encyclopedia of Horse Breeds. University of Oklahoma Press, 1995.
