= Dutch Draft =

Breed of horse

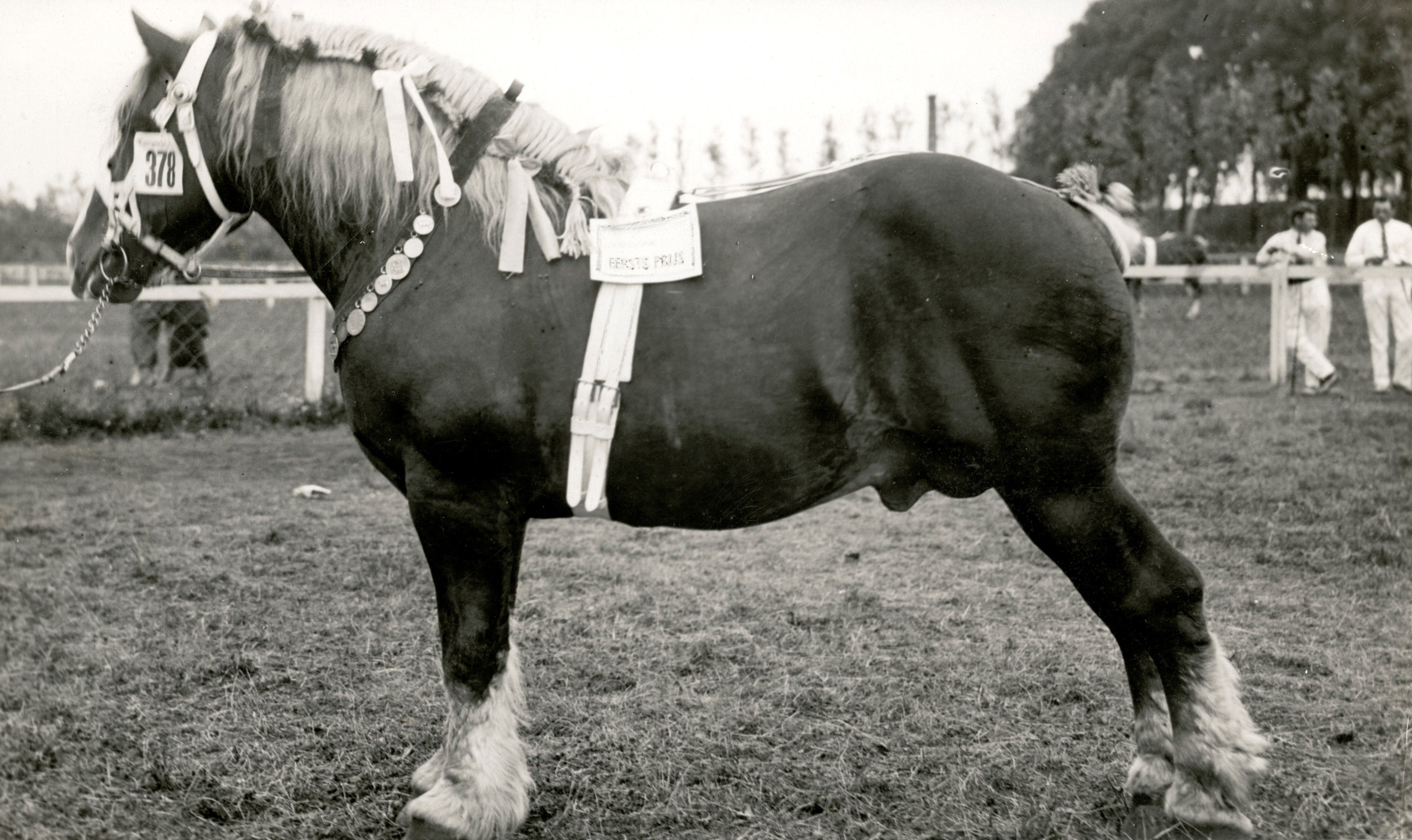

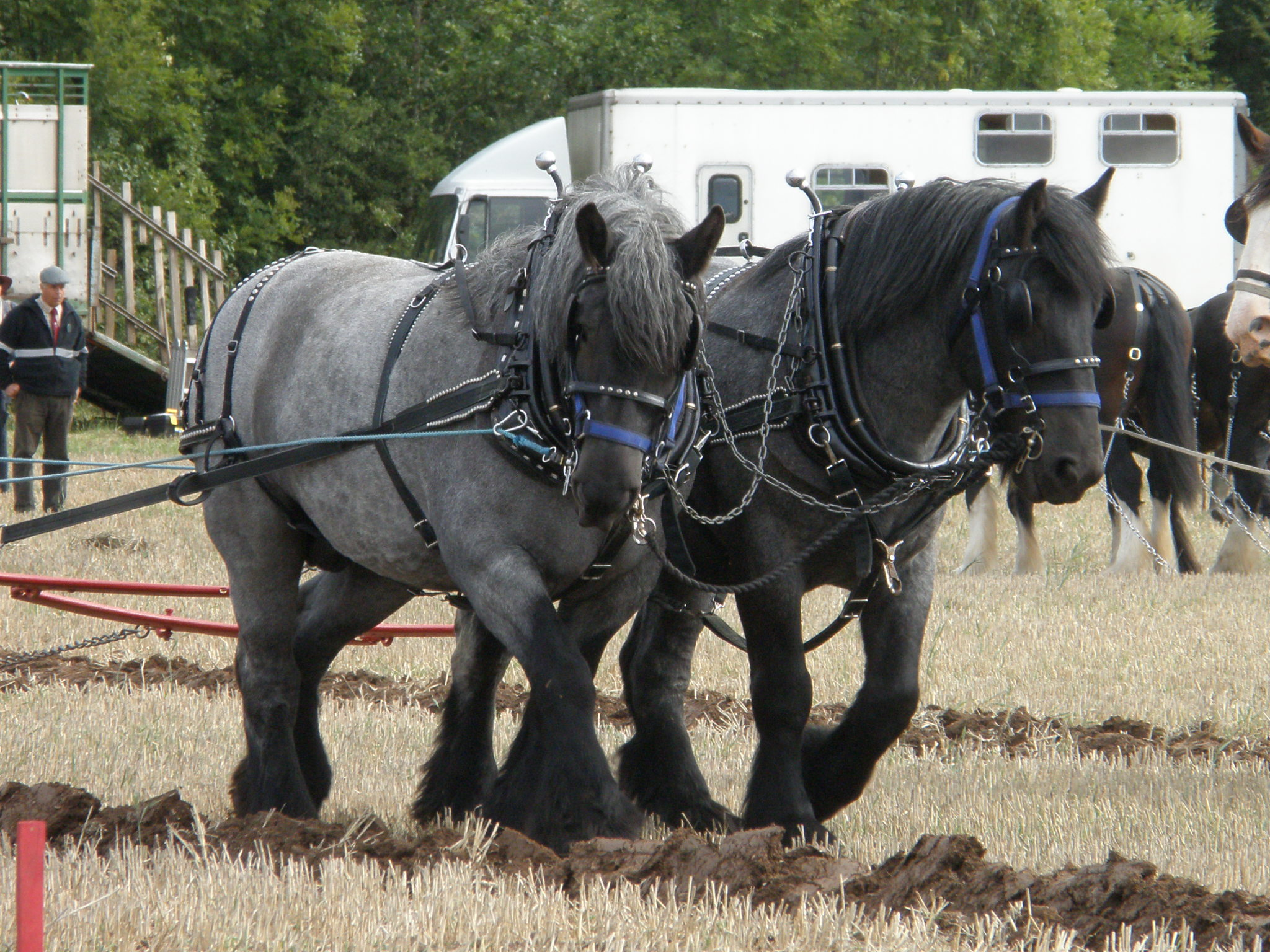
- Conservation status: FAO (2007): not at risk
- Other names: Dutch Draught; Dutch Horse; Netherlands Draft; Netherlands Draught; Zeeland Horse; Dutch: Nederlands Trekpaard; Dutch: Het Nederlandse Trekpaard; Dutch: Zeuwse Paard
- Country of origin: The Netherlands
- Distribution: central and southern Netherlands
- Use: draught work

Traits
- Weight: Male: 750 kg; Female: 700 kg
- Height: Male: 160 cm; Female: 155 cm

Breed standards
- Koninklijke Vereniging

The Dutch Draft or Nederlands Trekpaard is a Dutch breed of heavy draft horse. It is of cold-blood type, massively built and calm in temperament; it has good stamina. It was bred in the early twentieth century in the province of Zeeland, and may for that reason be known as the Zeeland Horse or Zeeuws Paard. It derives from cross-breeding of local Zeeland mares with the Belgian Ardennes and Brabant breeds, to which it is very similar.

== Characteristics ==
The Dutch Draft is a massive heavy-boned and muscular draft horse standing up to 16.3 hands, with free movements, a calm temperament and good stamina. It can be coloured bay, black, chestnut, roan, or gray, and the legs are heavily feathered.

According to the Royal Association breed standard, mares should be between 1.63m and 1.68m in height, stallions 1.66m to 1.72m. Minimum heights for registration are 1.62m to stallions, 1.55m for mares. Heights should not exceed 1.80m.

== Breed history ==
The Dutch Draft was created to work sand and clay agricultural lands in the years after the First World War by cross-breeding the heavy draft mares of the province of Zeeland with Ardennes and Brabant stock from neighbouring Belgium. Until after the Second World War, it was the most important Dutch horse breed, but with the mechanisation of agriculture, it declined rapidly. In 2009 the breed population was reported to be 1424.

There are two breeders' associations for the horse: the Koninklijke Vereniging Het Nederlandse Trekpaard en de Haflinger ("royal association for the Nederlands Trekpaard and the Haflinger") and the Stichting het Werkend Trekpaard Zeeland ("foundation for the working draught horse of Zeeland"); the former was founded in 1914, and received a royal charter in 1948.
