= Novoolexandrian Draught =

Ukrainian breed of draught horse

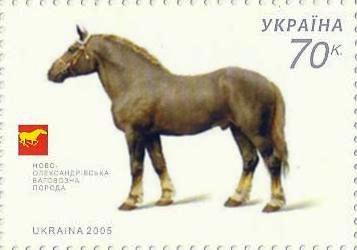
- On a Ukrainian postage stamp, 2005
- Conservation status: FAO (2007): no data; DAD-IS (2019): at risk
- Other names: Ukrainian: новоолександрівська ваговозна; Novooleksandrivska Vagovozna; Novooleksandrivskii Vagovoz; Newolexandrian Heavy Draught; Novoalexandrivska Cart
- Country of origin: Ukraine
- Distribution: Ukraine; Crimea
- Use: draught power; cross-breeding; horsemeat; milk

Traits
- Weight: Male: average: 590 kg; Female: average: 550 kg
- Height: Male: average: 155 cm; Female: average: 150 cm
- Colour: dark colours

The Novoolexandrian Draught (Ukrainian: новоолександрівська ваговозна, Novooleksandrivska Vahovozna) is a Ukrainian breed of draught horse. It is named for the state stud farm of Novo-Oleksandrivka in Bilovodsk Raion of Luhansk Oblast in the easternmost part of Ukraine, where it was bred. It shares its early history with the Russian Heavy Draught bred in Imperial Russia in the second half of the nineteenth century, and until after the Russian Revolution known as the Russian Ardennes; later development took place in Ukraine, where it received official recognition in 1999. It was bred for draught work, but it is also reared for meat and particularly for mare's milk, of which it is a high-yielding producer.

== History ==
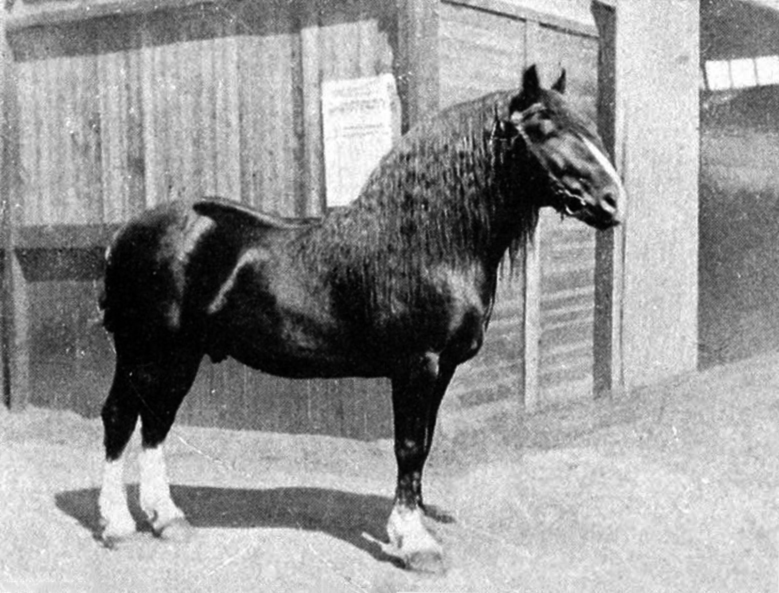
Russian Ardennes stallion at the Exposition Universelle, Paris, 1900

The Novoolexandrian Draught initially developed as a sub-type of the Russian Ardennes (later named Russian Heavy Draught), and so shares its early history. Selective breeding of what would become the Russian Ardennes began in the 1860s at the Petrovsky Agricultural and Forestry Academy in Moscow and at various stud farms including the historic Derkulsky Stud at Danilivka, in Bilovodsk Raion of Luhansk Oblast in the easternmost part of Ukraine. From about this time, stallions of the Franco-Belgian Ardennais heavy horse were imported to the Russian Empire from Sweden in increasing numbers; between 1875 and 1915, their number grew from nine to almost six hundred. These were put to local mares; some Brabançon, Percheron and Orlov Trotter blood was also introduced. The aim was to produce a compact draught animal suitable for farm work. The Russian Ardennes was presented at the Exposition Universelle in Paris in 1900. As with other Russian horse breeds, the events of the First World War and the Russian Revolution caused a severe decline in numbers; in 1924, fewer than a hundred Russian Ardennes stallions remained.

Several breed lines had developed within the Russian Ardennes, of which the smallest was the Dibrivsky, from the stud farm of the same name at Dibrivka in Myrhorod Raion of Poltava Oblast in Ukraine. In 1923 breeding stock of this line was moved to the stud farm of Novo-Oleksandrivka, which like the Derkulski Stud was in Bilovodsk Raion of Luhansk Oblast in eastern Ukraine. Other horses of the same type were moved there from a collective at Mariupol, in Donetsk Oblast, in 1929, and selective breeding for a compact but powerful draught horse began. In 1970 the Ukrainian or Novoolexandrian type was officially recognised by the Soviet ministry of agriculture. Following the break-up of the Soviet Union and the independence of Ukraine, the Novoolexandrian Draught received official recognition from the Ministry of Agrarian Policy in November 1999.
