= Estonian Native horse =

Estonian breed of horse

Estonian Native
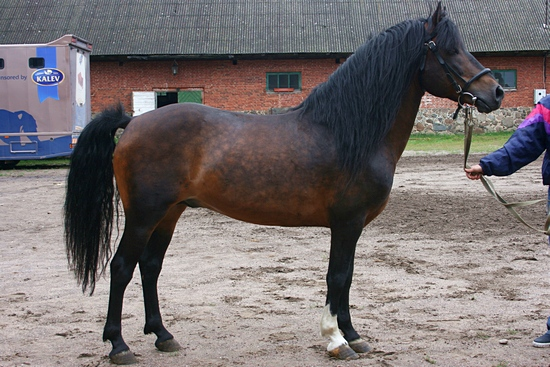

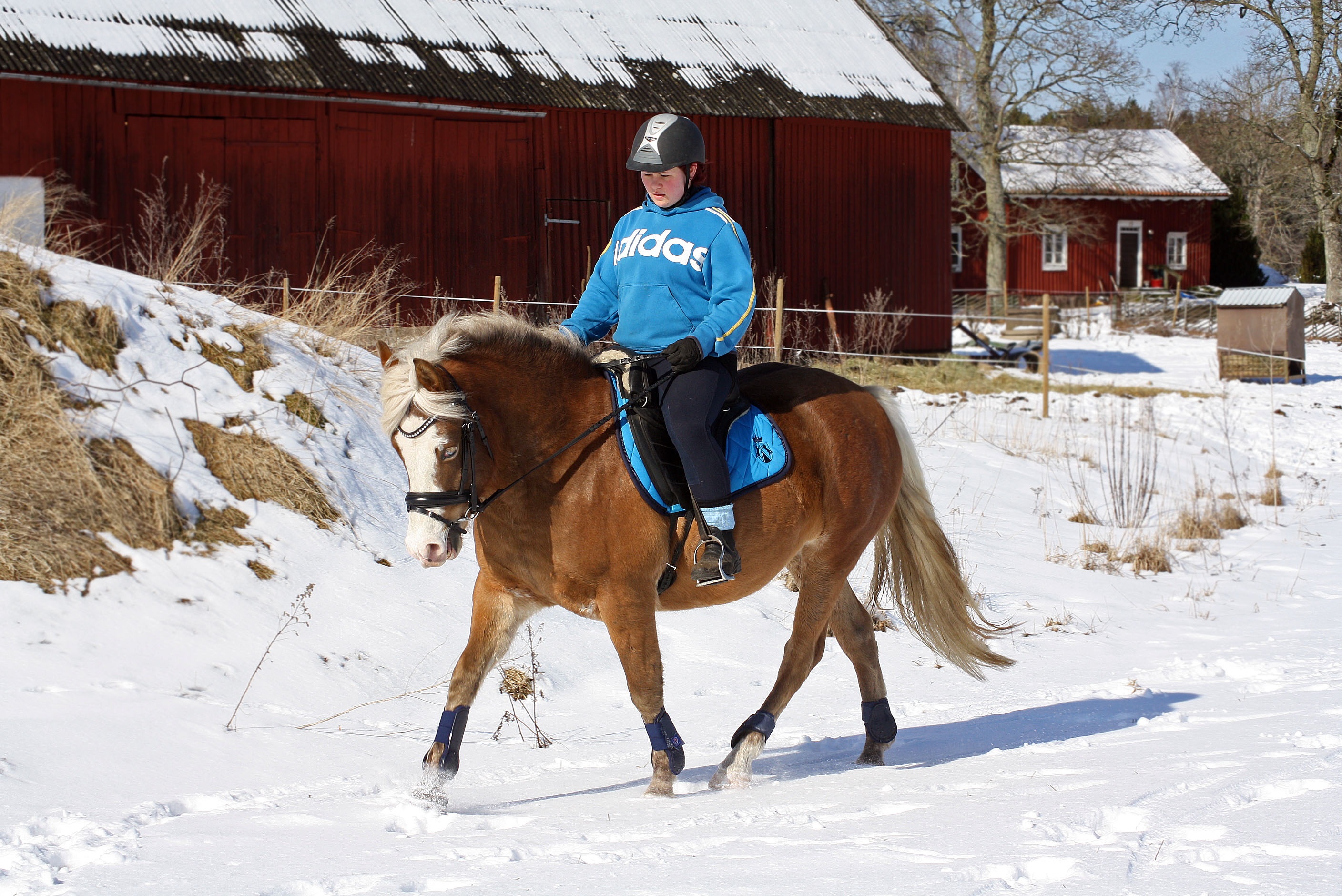
- Conservation status: FAO (2007): endangered-maintained; DAD-IS (2020): unknown
- Other names: Estonian Native Horse; Estonian: Eesti hobune; Klepper; Estonian Klepper
- Country of origin: Estonia
- Distribution: western coast, islands such as Saaremaa

Traits
- Weight: Male: average 450 kg; Female: average 420 kg
- Height: Male: average 147 cm; Female: average 145 cm
- Colour: usually bay, black, chestnut, grey

The Estonian Native or Estonian Klepper (Estonian: Eesti hobune) is an Estonian breed of small horse. It is one of three recognised horse breeds in Estonia, the others being the Tori and the Estonian Draft, both of which derive from it. It has also influenced other Northern European breeds such as the Latvian Warmblood, the Vyatka, and the extinct Obva in Russia. It is an endangered breed; the population fell from about 16000 in the 1950s to approximately 500 in 2004.

== History ==
During the eleventh century, the chronicler Adam of Bremen considered the Estonians to be rich in gold and good horses.

Estonian horses were exported to Russia through Novgorod in the fourteenth and fifteenth centuries.

The first documented attempts to improve the Estonian Native date from after the foundation in 1856 of the Tori stud farm in Tori, in Pärnu County in south-western Estonia, where the original native stock was selectively bred. It was also cross-bred with light draught and riding horse breeds, which led to the creation of the Tori.

After the First World War, when breed numbers were much reduced, measures were taken to re-establish the breed: a breed society was established in 1920, and in 1921 a stud-book was started. In the 1930s some limited use was made of Finnish and Arab stallions, with the aim of reducing inbreeding. During the Soviet occupation, large heavy horses were needed for farm work; the Klepper was cross-bred with other breeds and the original stock came close to extinction. In the second half of the twentieth century the population fell from about 16000 to approximately 500 head. It survived principally in the Baltic islands, of which Saaremaa and Hiiumaa are the two largest.

A new breed society, the Estonian Native Horse Conservation Society or Eesti Hobuse Kaitse Ühing, was established in 2000. The breed remains endangered, with a total population estimated at 1000 head. No numbers have been reported to DAD-IS since 2007, when the total was estimated at 600–950, with 522 broodmares and 57 stallions; no conservation status is assigned to it. The Laidevahe Nature Reserve on Saaremaa functions as a conservation area for the horses.

It is believed that the breed became mixed with the now extinct Öland Horse, as large numbers of Öland Horses were exported to Estonia at one point. Tests authorised by associations dedicated to the Öland Horse have revealed that these two breeds have a genetically similar background. In 2005, 25 animals of the breed were imported to Sweden to recreate the genetically closely related, extinct Öland Horse. The new Öland horse is not called that, however, but the "Estonian Bush Pony".

== Characteristics ==
It is small horse, standing 135 to 147 cm (13.1 to 14.2 h) at the withers. The most common colourations are black, bay, chestnut and grey; dun, mouse-dun and roan also occur. The head is small and broad, the neck thick, the chest broad, the croup rounded and the hooves hard.

Most breeders let their herds live under natural pasture conditions except during wintertime, and the breed lives well on forage alone.

== Use ==
The Klepper was traditionally used for transport and for agricultural work. In the twenty-first century it is used as a riding horse or for light harness work; some are used in the tourist industry to transport visitors to sites of interest.
