= South German Coldblood =

German breed of horse

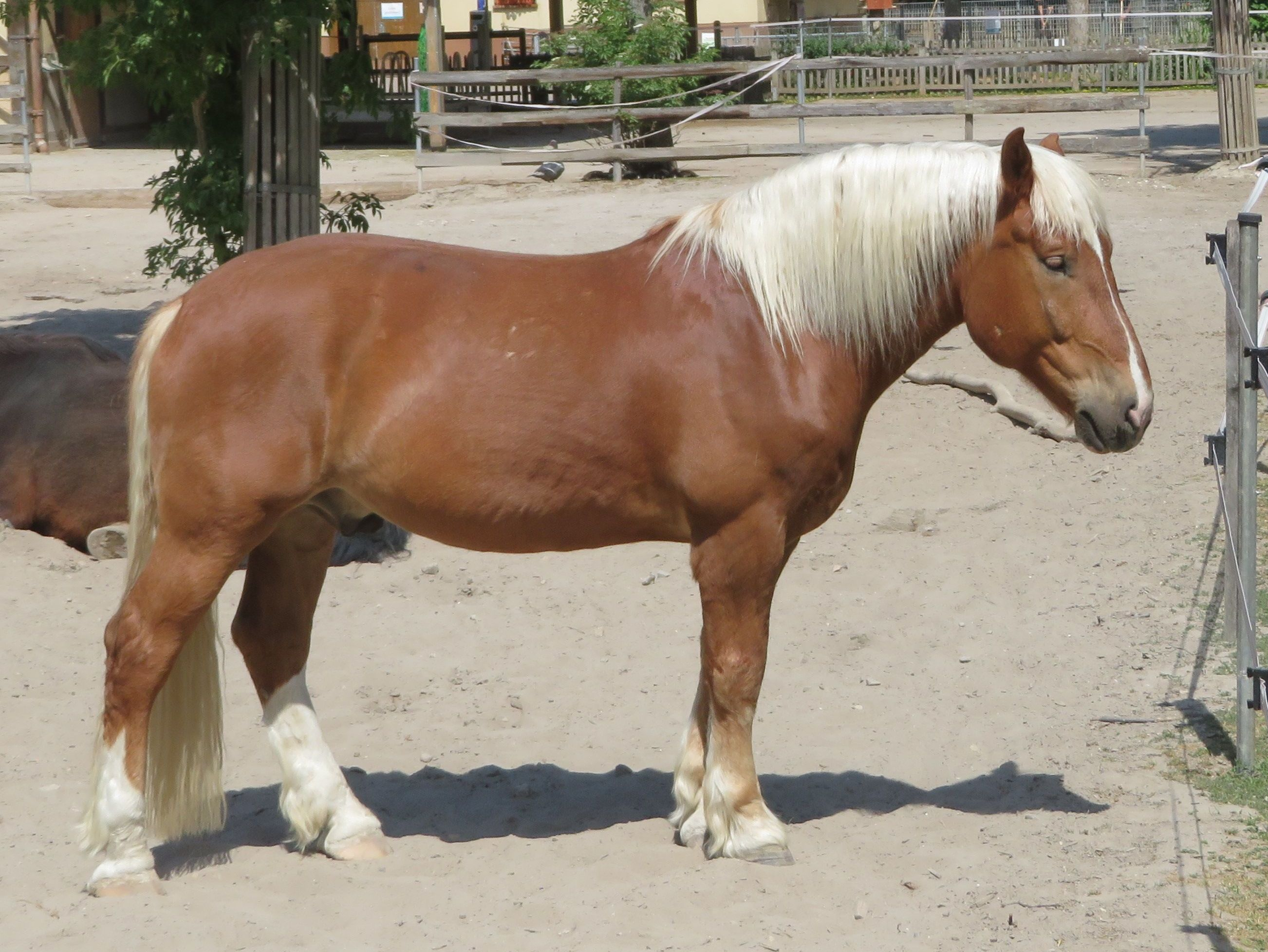

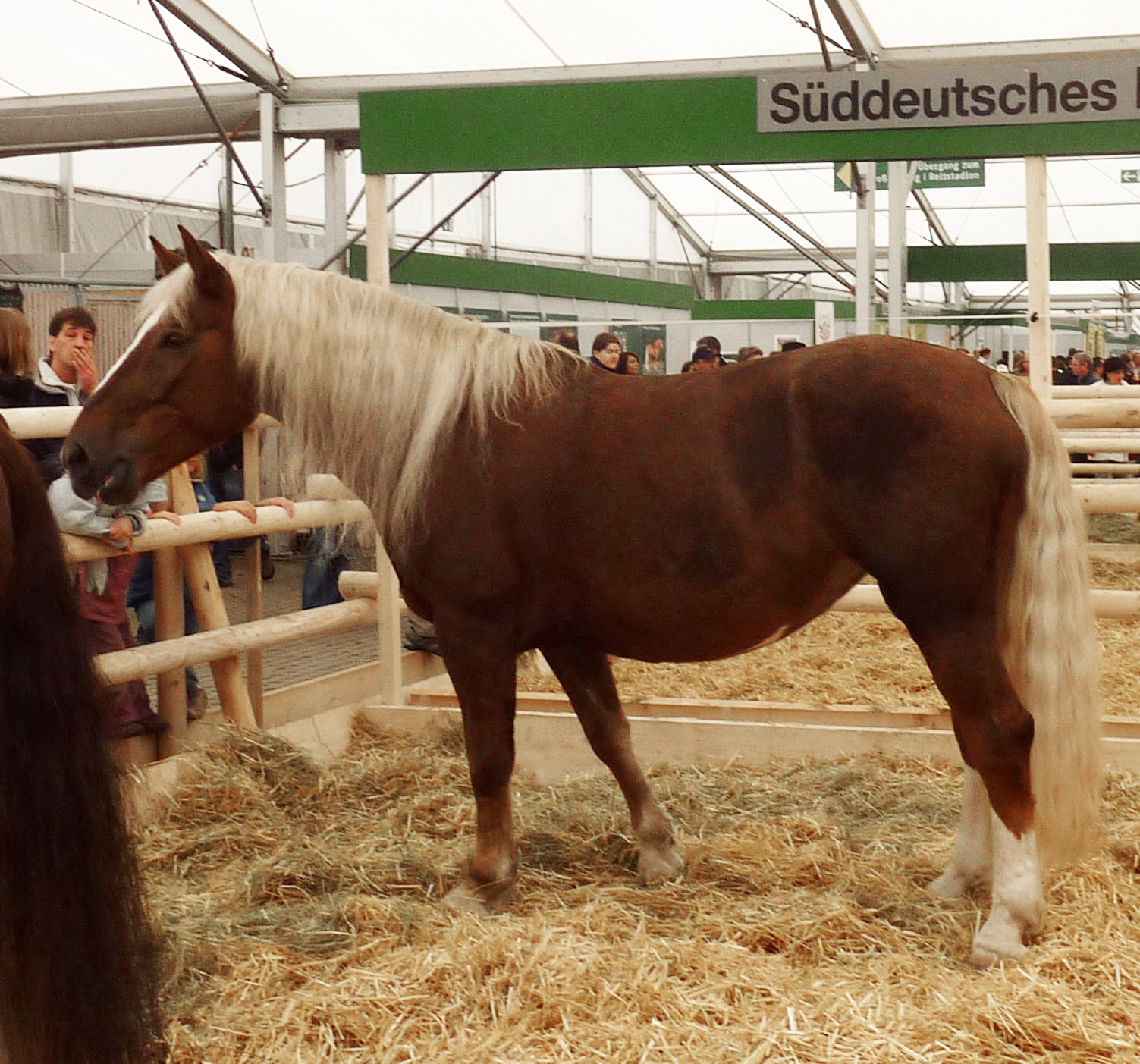
- Conservation status: FAO (2007): not at risk; DAD-IS (2025): at risk/endangered
- Other names: German: Süddeutsches Kaltblut; Noriker (obsolete); Pinzgauer (obsolete); Oberländer (obsolete)
- Country of origin: Germany

Traits
- Weight: Female: average 500 kg
- Height: Male: average 164 cm; Female: average 160 cm
- Colour: usually flaxen chestnut; also bay, black, grey or Leopard-spotted

Breed standards
- Pferdezuchtverband Baden-Württemberg e.V.

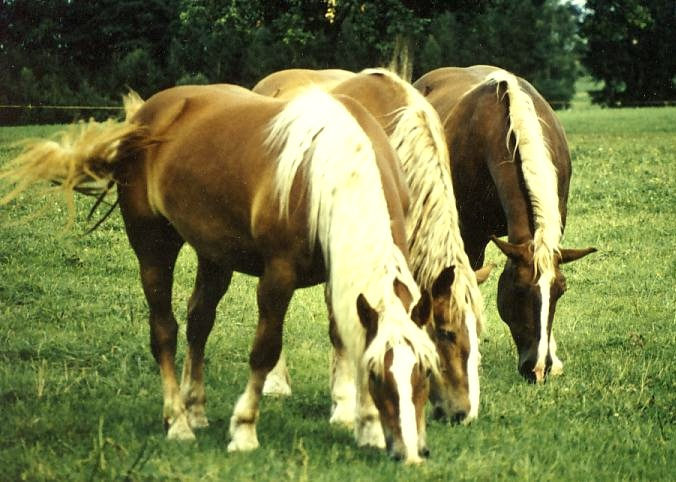
At pasture

The South German Coldblood, German: Süddeutsches Kaltblut, is a breed of draught horse from southern Germany. It is distributed mainly in Bavaria. It is the most numerous of the four principal German draught horse breeds – the others being the Black Forest Horse, the Rhenish German Coldblood and the Schleswig Coldblood – and is the only one not listed as endangered by the Food and Agriculture Organization of the United Nations or by the Gesellschaft zur Erhaltung alter und gefährdeter Haustierrassen, the German national association for the conservation of historic and endangered domestic animal breeds.

== Characteristics ==
About four out of five of the horses are flaxen chestnut ('fuchs'); others may be bay, black or grey. Like the Noriker, the South German Coldblood is one of the few horse breeds to sometimes display leopard- or "tiger"-spotting.

The South German Coldblood is particularly susceptible to the bone diseases osteochondrosis and osteochondritis dissecans. A study of 167 young horses averaging 14 months old found osteochondritic lesions in the fetlock or hock joints of 61.7% of the sample, and osseous fragments in 28.9%. The incidence in fillies was double that in colts, and symptoms were more often seen in horses a year or more old. Three single nucleotide polymorphisms associated with osteochondritis dissecans in fetlock joints have been identified.

== History ==
The South German Coldblood shares common origins with the Noriker breed of Austria, and the two breeds are sometimes considered an entity. However, genetic analysis has shown it to be not only quite distant from the other German draught breeds, but also to be clearly distinguishable from the Salzburg and Carinthian Noriker populations. The differences may be attributable to Thoroughbred and warmblood influences on the South German Coldblood.

In 1906 a stud-book was established for horses of Noriker type in the Bavarian Oberland, the upland region of central southern Bavaria that borders with modern Austria. From 1920 breeding came under Bavarian state control at the former State Stud of Schwaiganger at Ohlstadt; the stud-book was closed, and an edelweiss symbol was adopted as a brand. At this time the lighter type of Noriker horse was known in Bavaria as the Oberländer, and the heavier type was called, as in Austria, the Pinzgauer; this distinction was dropped in 1939, and the name Noriker applied to all. In 1948 the present name, Süddeutsches Kaltblut, was adopted.

The breeding population has remained relatively stable since 1997, when it was 2113. In 2013 it was reported as 1921 mares and 129 stallions, totalling 2050.
