= Estonian Draft =

Breed of horse

- Other names: Eesti raskeveohobune, Eston-Arden, Estonian Ardennes
- Country of origin: Estonia

The Estonian Draft or Eston-Arden (Estonian: Eesti raskeveohobune) is a breed of draft horse developed in Estonia. They were developed from a cross of Estonian Native horses, and Swedish Ardennes, and were officially recognized by the Estonian government in 1953. Population numbers have decreased since the early 1990s and today inbreeding is of significant concern. The breed is considered to be endangered by the Estonian government. Although originally used for heavy draft work, they are now used mainly for small-scale gardening.

== Breed characteristics ==
Estonian Drafts are generally bay or chestnut in color. Through selective breeding, they have become well adapted to the soil in northern Estonia.

== History ==
Estonian Native horses were crossed with Swedish Ardennes stallions to create a draft horse that was an easy keeper that was powerful yet fast. A stud book was established in 1921, and the breed was officially recognized by the Estonian government in 1953. At the same time the Estonian Draft was developed, the Lithuanian Heavy Draft and the Soviet Heavy Draft also came into being in order to serve a demand for heavy draft horses in the Soviet Union. As of 1994, there were approximately 400 Estonian Drafts in existence, including about 15 breeding stallions and 120 breeding mares. At that time, population numbers were reported to be decreasing. Another type developed in the 1990s for use as a harness horse. Although there were originally eight main blood lines, by 2004 the breed had been reduced to four stallion lines, and only 14 purebred foals were born.

As of 1 January 2009, there were 233 registered Estonian Draft horses, including 84 brood mares and 6 breeding stallions. At that point, concerns were raised about increasing amounts of inbreeding leading to decreased health and reproductive efficiency and increasing amounts of undesirable traits. All six of the breeding stallions were considered inbred, and three were closely related to each other. Because of these low population numbers and limited breeding stock, further inbreeding is almost inevitable. As of 2011, the breed is considered to be endangered and is found mainly in the Lääne-Viru and Ida-Viru counties. The Estonian Draft is one of three recognized horse breeds in Estonia, the others being the Tori and the Estonian Native horse. The Estonian Horse Breeders' Society is responsible for the monitoring and conservation of the breed. Although originally bred for agricultural uses, in the 21st century they are mainly used for small-scale gardening. A few are employed in forestry, while others appear in horse shows and pulling beer wagons. The breed is the least populous of the three Estonian breeds.
