= Rhenish German Coldblood =

German breed of horse

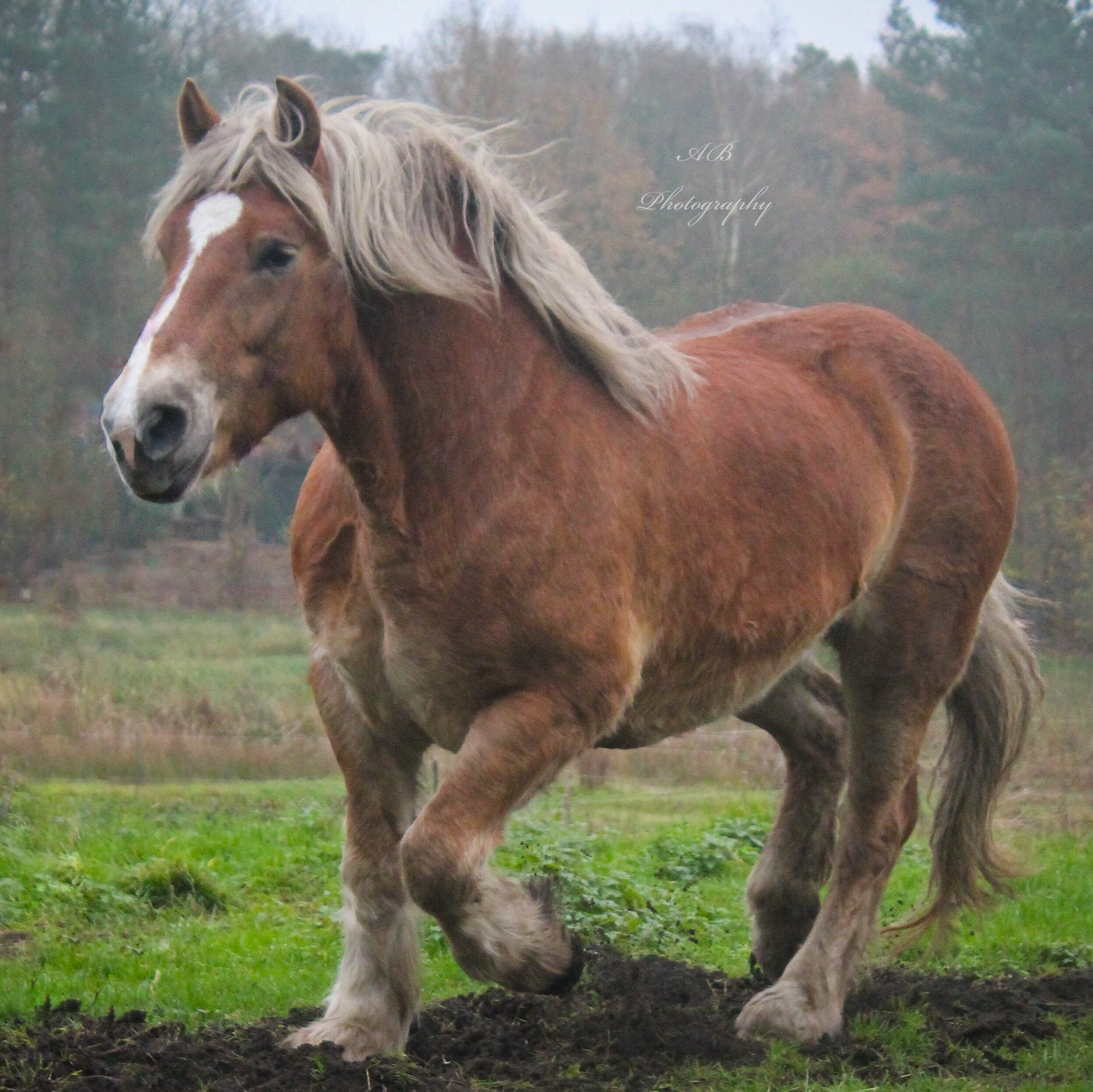

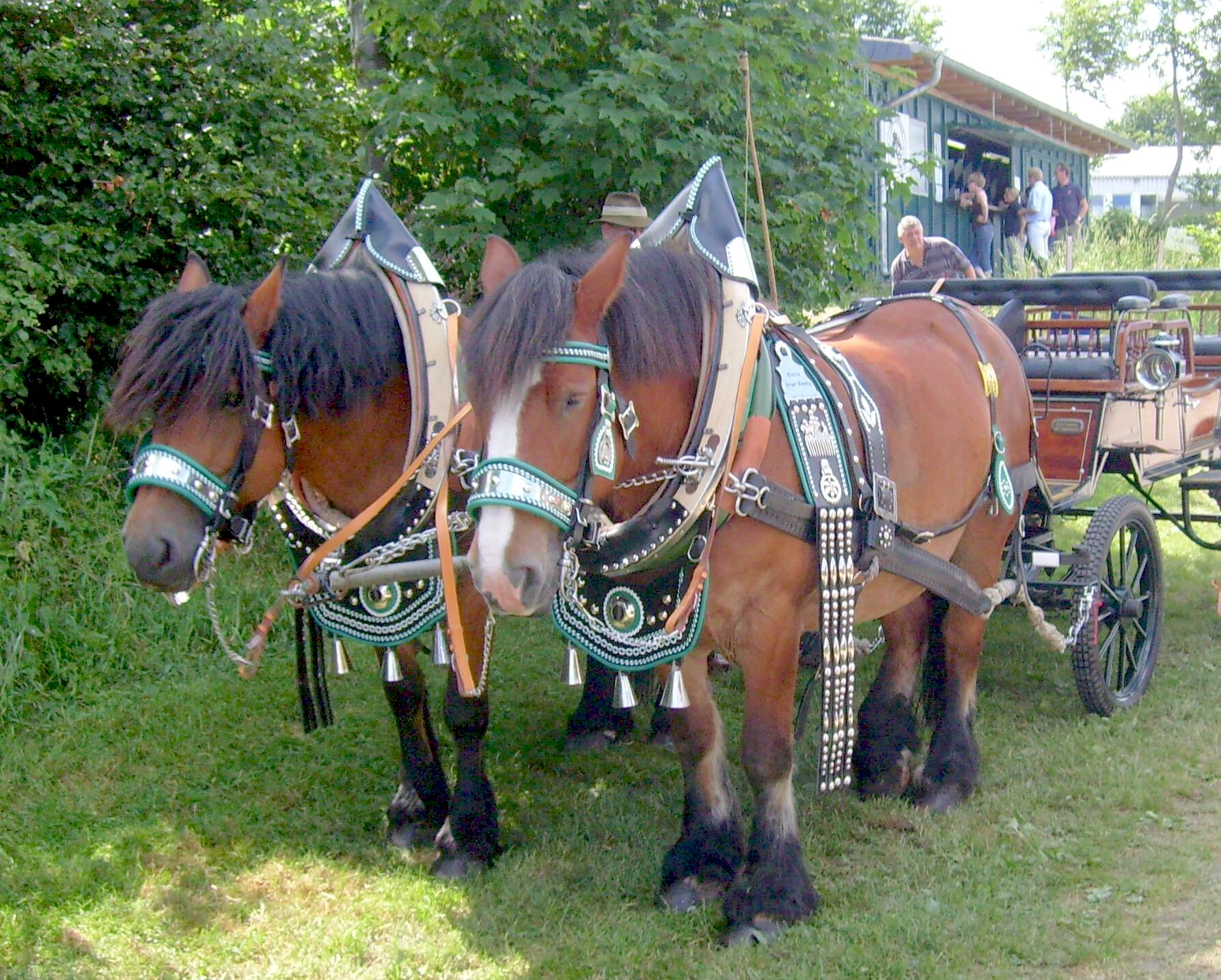
- Conservation status: FAO (2007): endangered; GEH: Category III, endangered
- Other names: German Coldblood; Rhenish; Rhenish-Belgian; Rhenish Coldblood; Rhenish German Draught Horse; Rhenish-Westphalian; Rheinisch-Deutsches Kaltblut; Rheinisches Kaltblut; Rheinisch-Westfälisches Kaltblut; Rhineland Heavy Draught
- Country of origin: Germany
- Distribution: Nordrhein-Westfalen
- Standard: Deutsche Reiterliche Vereinigung e.V.

Traits
- Height: minimum 158 cm; usually 162–172 cm

The Rhenish German Coldblood, German: Rheinisch-Deutsches Kaltblut, is a German breed of heavy draught horse from the Rhineland area of western Germany. It was bred in second part of the nineteenth century, principally at the Prussian state stud at Schloss Wickrath in Wickrathberg, now part of Mönchengladbach in North Rhine-Westphalia.

== History ==
The farmers of the Rhineland needed powerful horses to work the heavy loess soil of the area. In the nineteenth century various heavy horses were imported from neighbouring countries – Belgium, Denmark, France and the Netherlands – as were Clydesdale, Shire and Suffolk Punch animals from England; these led to little improvement of the local stock, partly because of acclimatisation problems, partly because of lack of a clear direction. In the 1870s the decision was taken at the Prussian state stud at Schloss Wickrath, at that time in the Rhine Province of the Kingdom of Prussia, to concentrate breeding on the Belgian type. The first Belgian stallions stood at Wickrath in 1876, and by 1880 there were fifty. A stud-book was opened in 1892; there were 148 mares registered in that year. Numbers of the breed grew rapidly in the first half of the twentieth century, and by 1946 there were 26990 registered mares. In some years 700 young stallions were presented for approval for breeding.

The Second World War caused a drastic decline in the Rhenish German Coldblood. While there was a brief revival in agricultural use of horses in the post-War years, the progressive mechanisation of agriculture led to a further decline. The Wickrath stud was closed in 1957, and merged into the stud of Warendorf, in Westphalia. By 1975 there were eleven mares and two stallions registered in the stud-book. Numbers slowly recovered, to about 1500 in total in the late 2010s; in 2023 a total of 1137 head was reported, with 1010 brood-mares and 127 active stallions.

The Rhenish German Coldblood was listed as "endangered" by the Food and Agriculture Organization of the United Nations in 2007; in 2025 it was listed in Category III, gefährdet, 'endangered', on the red list of the Gesellschaft zur Erhaltung alter und gefährdeter Haustierrassen, and as "at risk/endangered" in the DAD-IS database of the FAO.

Because of the political division of Germany in the aftermath of the Second World War, which lasted until the Fall of the Berlin Wall in 1989, there was for more than fifty years no possibility of interbreeding between populations of the Rhenish German Coldblood in West Germany and those in the East. Three regional sub-populations of the breed developed in East Germany during this time: the Altmärkisches Kaltblut in the historical Altmark region, the Mecklenburger Kaltblut in the historical Mecklenburg region, and the Sächsisch-Thüringisches Kaltblut in Thuringia and the former province of Saxony. As a result of their long reproductive isolation, the Mecklenburger and Sächsisch-Thüringische sub-populations, while genetically indistinguishable, were formerly considered genetically distinct from the Rhenish German Coldblood of the western part of the country. The three sub-populations were merged into the stud-book of the Rhenish German Coldblood in 2004.

== Characteristics ==
It is a large heavy horse, with an average body weight of about 1000 kg and a height at the withers usually in the range 162–172 cm. (Note: The Zentrale Dokumentation Tiergenetischer Ressourcen in Deutschland gives a lower range of 149–159 cm for the height at the withers of mares.) The breed standard specifies a minimum height of 158 cm and a minimum cannon-bone measurement of 24 cm for mares and 25 cm for stallions and geldings. The coat may be of any of the usual colours: bay, black, chestnut or grey in various shades.

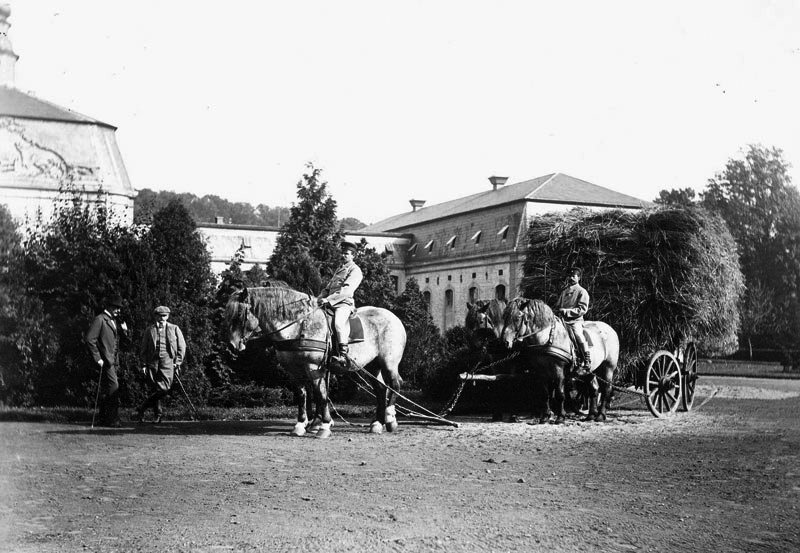
Pulling a hay wain at Schloss Wickrath, about 1900

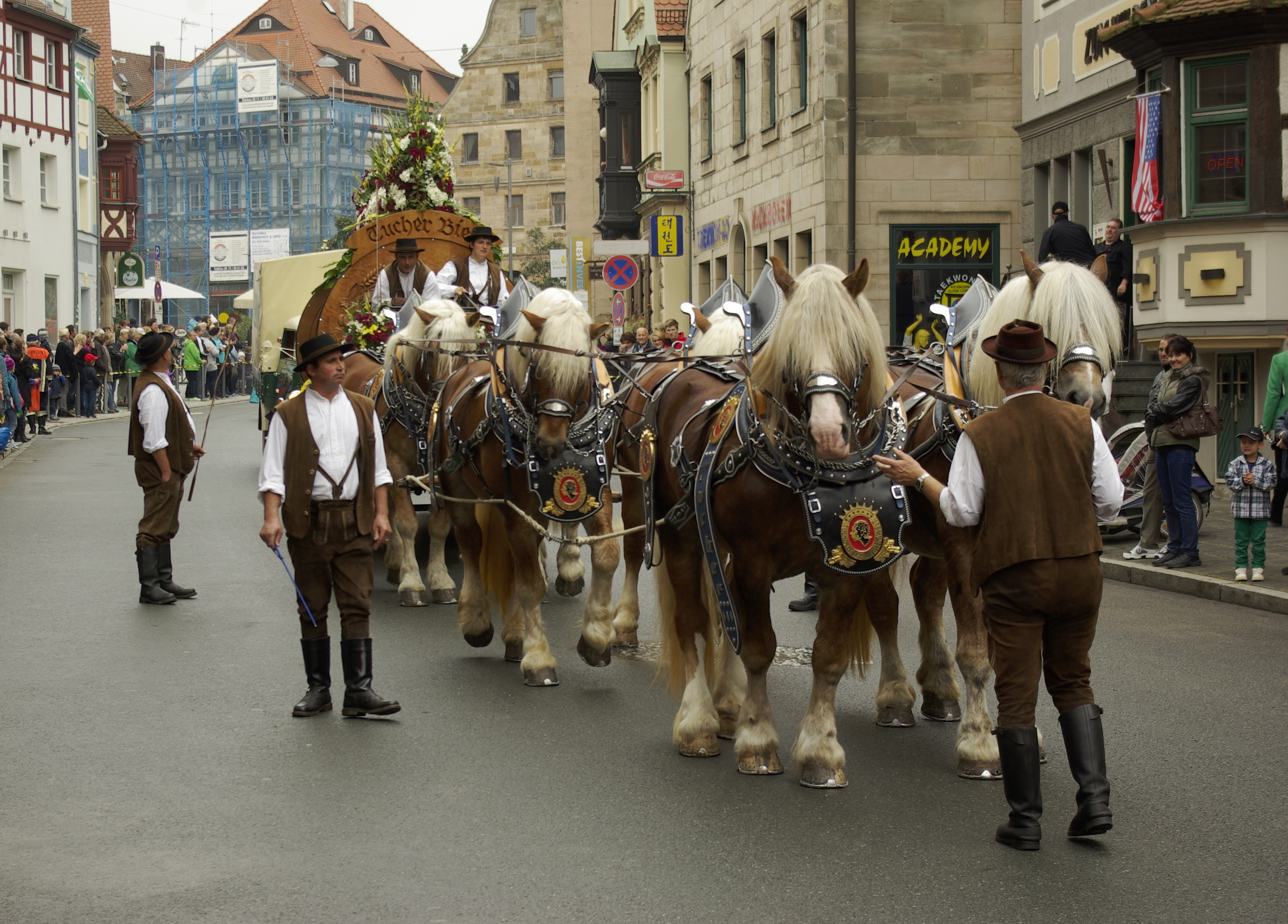
Team of six drawing a brewer's dray

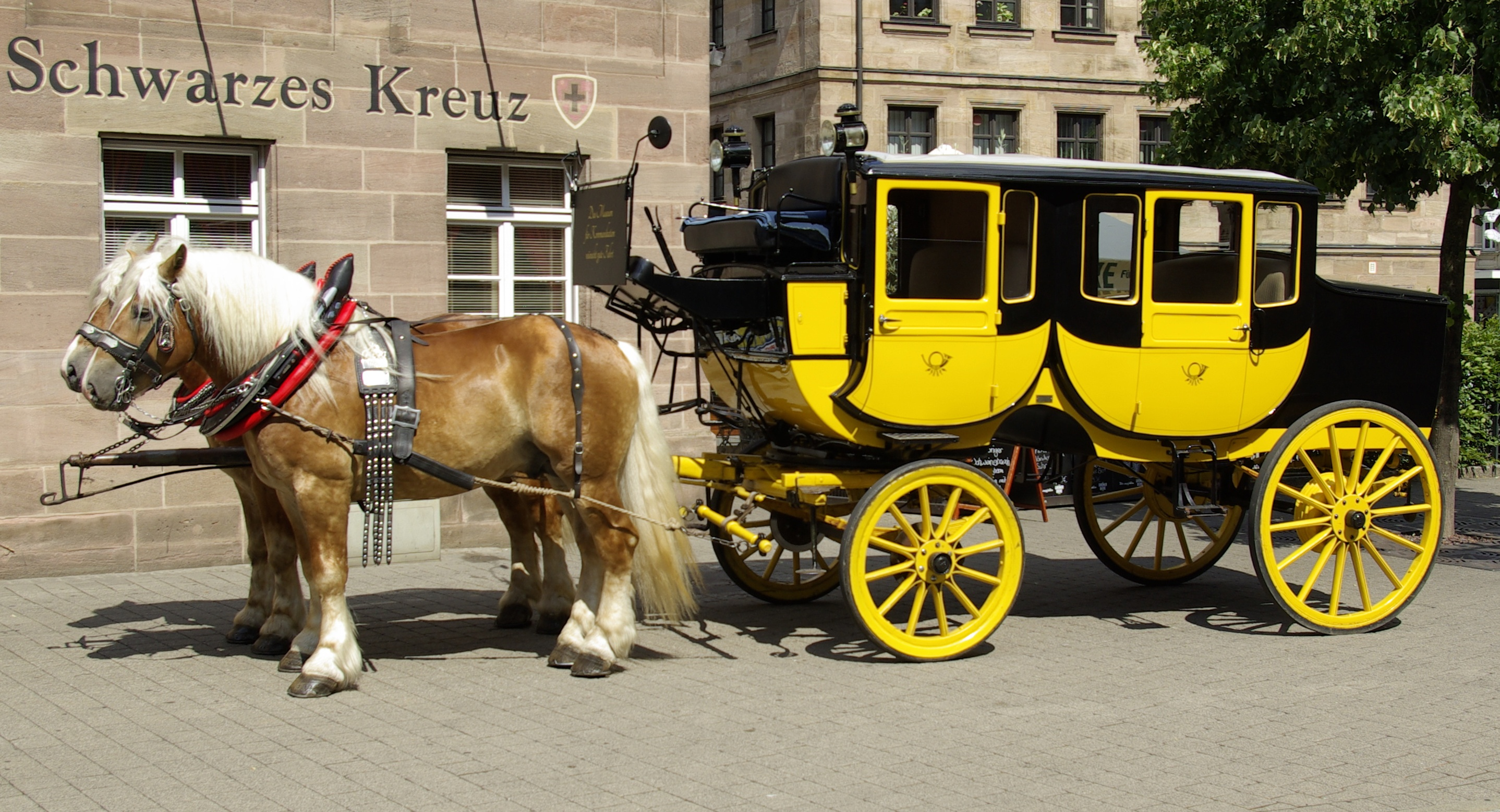
Pair hitched to a post coach
