= Draft horse =

Large horse bred for heavy work

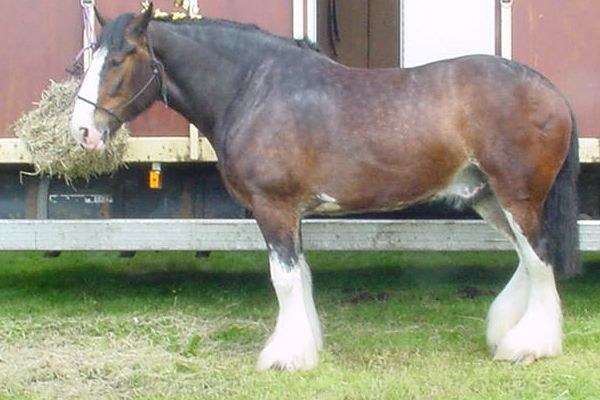
A draft horse is generally a large, heavy horse suitable for farm labor, like this Shire horse.

A draft horse (US) or draught horse (UK), also known as dray horse, carthorse, work horse, or heavy horse, is a large horse bred to pull heavy loads and work agricultural tasks such as plowing. A number of breeds with varying characteristics are of this type, but all share common traits of strength, patience, and a docile temperament. While indispensable to generations of pre-industrial farmers, draft horses have since been used for many purposes, such as driving, logging, and farming, as well as recreation and showing. Draft horses have been crossed with light riding breeds, such as the Thoroughbred, to create sport horse and warmblood breeds.

== Characteristics ==
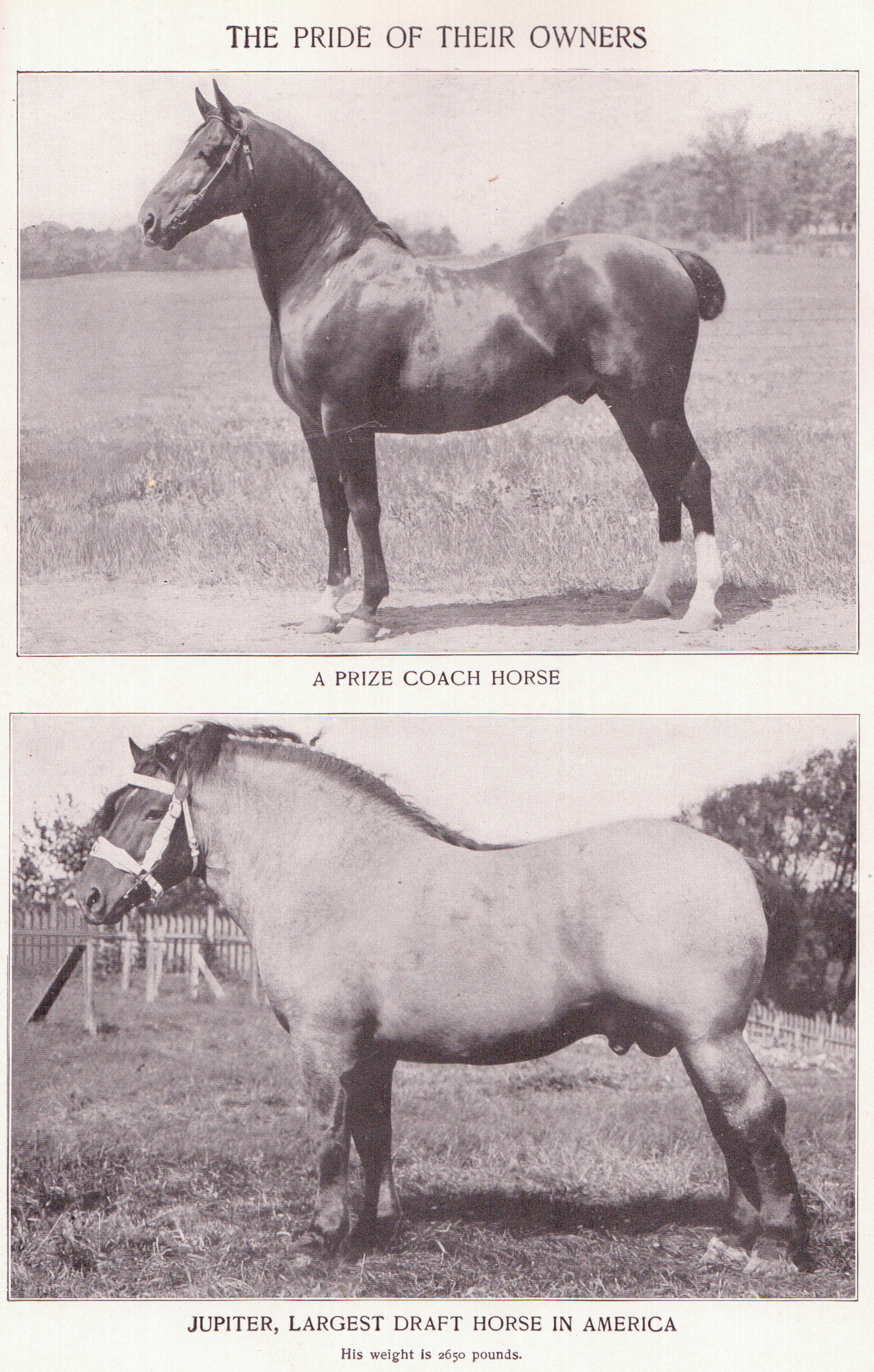
Comparison of a typical-sized carriage horse (top) to a heavy draft horse (bottom)

Draft horses are recognizable by their extremely muscular build. They tend to have broad, short backs with powerful hindquarters. In general, they are taller and tend to have heavier bone and a more upright shoulder than riding horses, producing conformation that is well suited for pulling. Many draft breeds have heavier hair, called feathering, on their lower legs. Draft breeds range from about 163 to 193 cm (16 to 19 hands) in height and from 640 to 910 kg (1,400 to 2,000 lb) in weight. Draft horses are much larger than riding horses, and have a more muscular build than coach horses, which were large and strong enough to pull large driving vehicles.

== Background and history ==
Humans domesticated horses and used them to perform a variety of duties, including hauling heavy loads, plowing fields, and other tasks that required pulling ability. A heavy, calm, patient, and well-muscled animal was desired for this work. Conversely, a light, more energetic horse was needed for riding and rapid transport. Thus, to the extent possible, a certain amount of selective breeding was used to develop different types of horse for different types of work.

A common misunderstanding is that the Destrier that carried the armoured knight of the Middle Ages had the size and conformation of a modern draft horse, and some of these medieval war horses may have provided some bloodlines for some of the modern draft breeds. The reality was that the high-spirited, quick-moving Destrier was closer to the size, build, and temperament of a modern Andalusian or Baroque-type horse. Also, horses of more phlegmatic temperaments were used for pulling military wagons or performing ordinary farm work, which provided bloodlines of the modern draft horse. Records indicate that even medieval drafts were not as large as those today. Of the modern draft breeds, the Percheron probably has the closest ties to the medieval war horse.

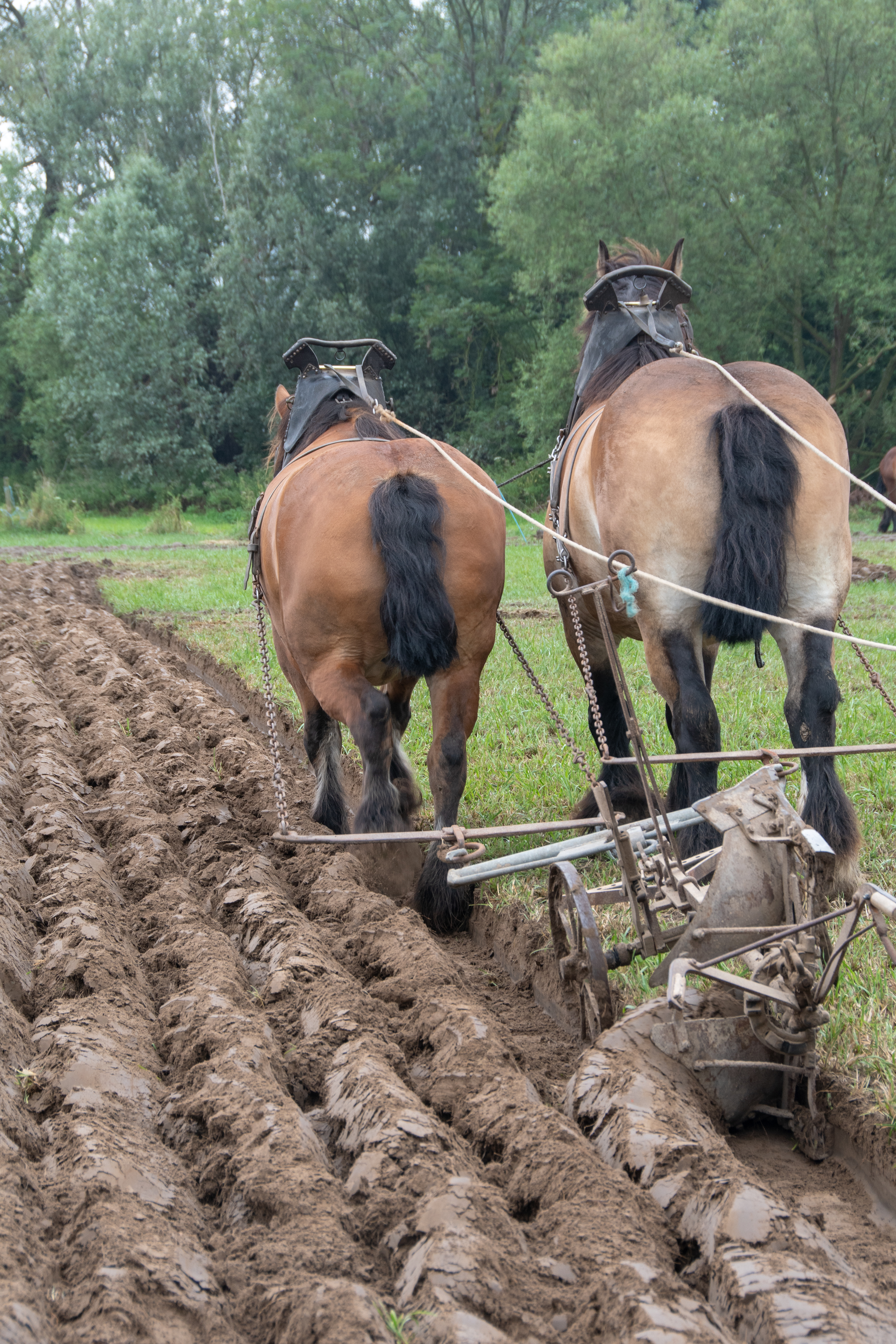
Draft horses plowing

By the 19th century, horses weighing more than 1,600 pounds (730 kg) that also moved at a quick pace were in demand. Tall stature, muscular backs, and powerful hindquarters made the draft horse a source of horsepower for farming, hauling freight, and moving passengers. The advent of railroads actually increased demand for working horses, as materials and products of a growing economy still needed to be transported to and from the goods yard or rail stations.

In the late 19th and early 20th centuries, thousands of draft horses were imported from Western Europe into the United States: Percherons came from France, Brabants from Belgium, Shires from England, and Clydesdales from Scotland, and breed registries were established in the US for the imported breeds. The Percheron, with 40,000 broodmares registered as of 1915, was America's most numerous draft breed at the turn of the 20th century. Two draft breeds developed in the US include the American Cream Draft, with a stud book established in 1944, and the Spotted Draft, which originated in the 1970s by crossing a "Morocco Spotted" stallion (pinto Hackney horse) with a black Percheron mare. The North American Spotted Draft Horse Association (NASDHA) was founded in 1995.

Over half a million draft horses were used during World War I. The British were importing American draft horses to supplement their dwindling stock even before America joined the war, preferring Percheron crosses that they felt had "great endurance, fine physique, soundness, activity, willingness to work, and almost unfailing good temper". British buyers were buying 10,000 to 25,000 American horses and mules a month, eventually making up about two-thirds of British Army war horses.

However, beginning in the late 19th century, and with increasing mechanization of agriculture in the 20th century, especially following World War I in the US and after World War II in Europe, the popularity of the internal combustion engine, and particularly the tractor, reduced the need for the draft horse. Many were sold to slaughter, and several breeds went into significant decline.

=== Vehicles ===
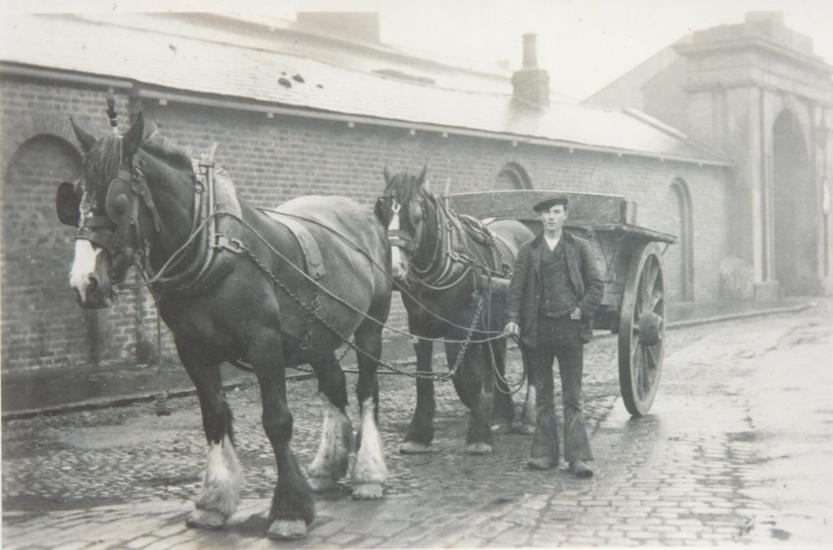
A carter and his two draft horses, c. 1910

Draft horses have been used to pull heavy wheeled vehicles such as:

- horsecars (trams on rails)
- horse-drawn omnibuses
- Gypsy vardos
- lorries and trolleys (delivery and haulage)
- heavy freight wagons like the Conestoga wagon and all manner of wagons
- large haulage carts

== Modern uses ==
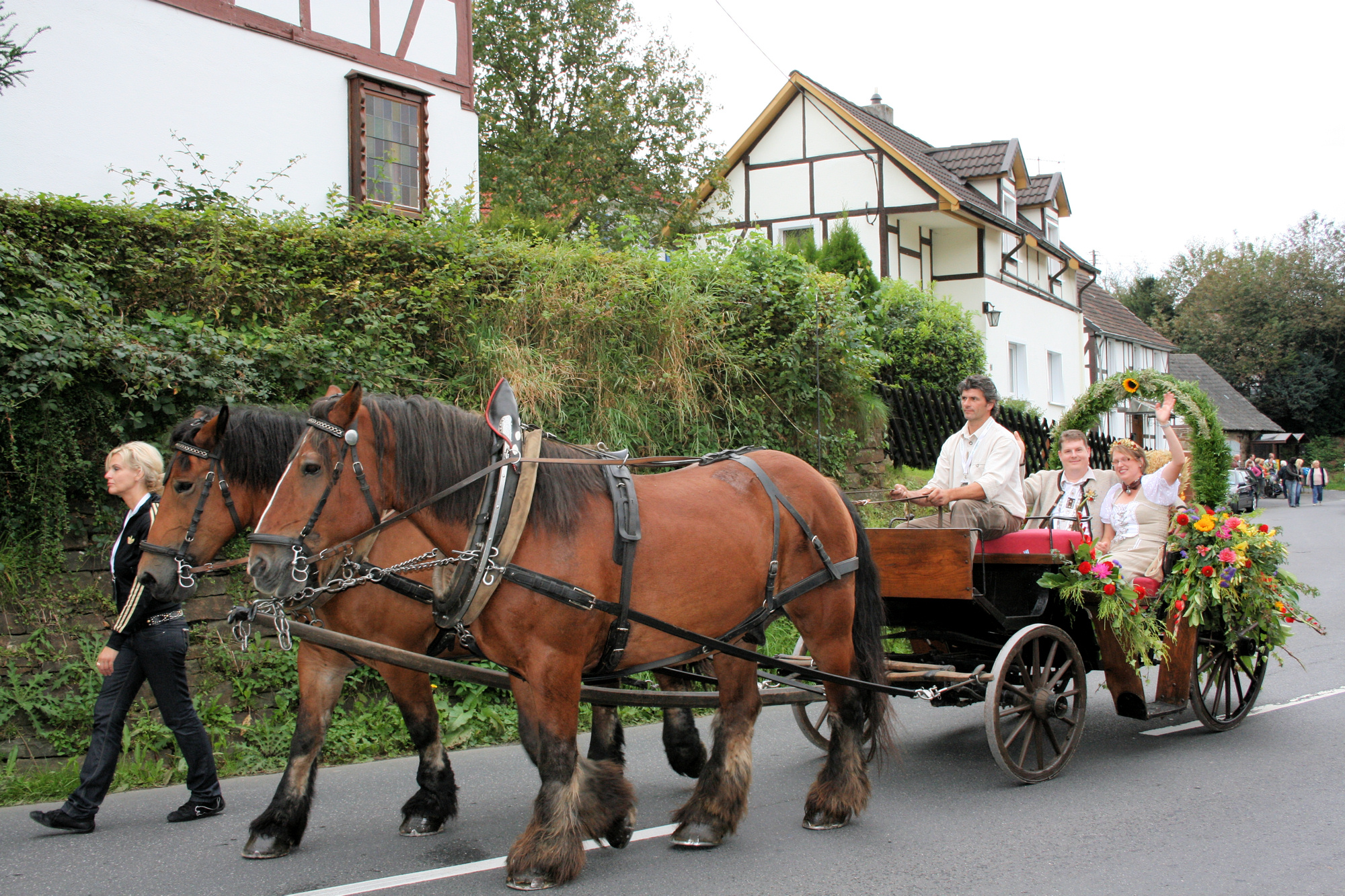
Modern draft horses

Today, draft horses can be seen in horse shows, pulling competitions, heavy horse trials, parades pulling large wagons, and pulling tourist carriages, and they are still seen on some smaller farms in the US and Europe. They are still used by agrarian groups such as the Amish and Mennonites. Draft horses are used for logging in dense woodland where space for mechanized vehicles is insufficient or for other fire or conservation considerations. Draft horses are still used to tow some canal boats in England.

Draft horse breeds have played a significant role in the development of many warmblood breeds, popular today in advanced-level equine sports.

Small areas still exist where draft horses are widely used as transportation due to legislation preventing automotive traffic, such as on Mackinac Island in the United States.

== Care ==
Management of a large draft horse can be costly, including feed, shoeing, and veterinary care. Although many draft horses can work without a need for shoes, if they are required, farriers may charge twice the price to shoe a draft horse as a light riding horse because of the extra labor and specialized equipment required. Historically, draft horses were shod with horseshoes that were significantly wider and heavier than those for other types of horses, custom-made, often with caulkins.

The draft horse's metabolism is a bit slower than lighter horse breeds, more akin to that of ponies, requiring less feed per pound of body weight. This is possibly due to their calmer nature. Nonetheless, because of their sheer size, most require a significant amount of feed per day. Generally, a supplement to balance nutrients is preferred over a large quantity of grain. They consume hay or other forage from 1.5% to 3% of their body weight per day, depending on work level. They also can drink up to 95 litres; 21 imperial gallons (25 US gal) of water a day. Overfeeding can lead to obesity, and risk of laminitis can be a concern.

== World records ==
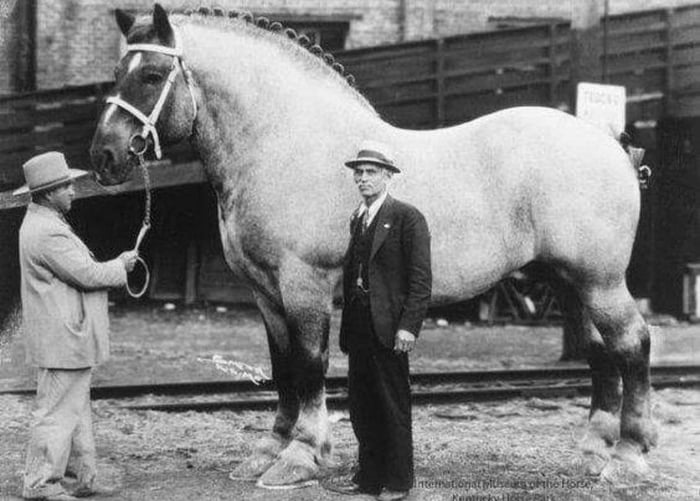
Brooklyn Supreme

The largest horse in recorded history was probably a Shire born in 1846 named Sampson (renamed Mammoth). He stood 21.2 h (218 centimetres) high, and his peak weight was estimated at 1,524 kilograms (3,360 lb). Brooklyn Supreme (1928–1948) was a Belgian draft horse, 19.2 h (198 centimetres) high and weighed 3,200 lb (1,451 kg). At over 19 h (193 centimetres), a Shire gelding named Goliath (1977–2001) was the Guinness Book of World Records record holder for the world's tallest living horse (until his death). Big Jake (2001–2021), an American Belgian standing 20.275 h (210.2 centimetres), held the record for tallest living horse from 2010 until his death in 2021. As of 2024, there is no living record holder.

== Draft breeds ==
The following breeds of horse are considered draft breeds:

- American Belgian Draft
- American Cream Draft
- Ardennais
- Auxois
- Belgian Draught/Brabant
- Boulonnais
- Breton
- Clydesdale
- Comtois
- Dølehest
- Dutch Draft
- Estonian Draft
- Finnhorse
- Fjord
- Freiberger (Franches-Montagnes)
- Friesian
- Haflinger
- Irish Draught
- Italian Heavy Draft
- Jutland
- Latvian
- Lithuanian Heavy Draught
- Malopolski
- Međimurje (Murakoz)
- Noriker
- North Swedish Horse
- Novoolexandrian Draught
- Percheron
- Pfalz-Ardenner
- Rhenish German Coldblood (Rhineland Heavy Draught)
- Russian Heavy Draft
- Schleswig Coldblood
- Shire
- Sokolski
- South German Coldblood
- Soviet Heavy Draft
- Suffolk Punch
- Swedish Ardennes
- Trait du Maine (extinct)
- Trait du Nord
- Vladimir Heavy Draft

== See also ==
- Driving (horse)
- Heavy warmblood
- Working animal § Draft animals
- Ox § Uses and comparison to horses
- Meat horse – Horses bred specifically for horse meat
- Equus giganteus
