= Schloss Wickrath =

Coordinates: 51°07′44″N 6°24′58″E

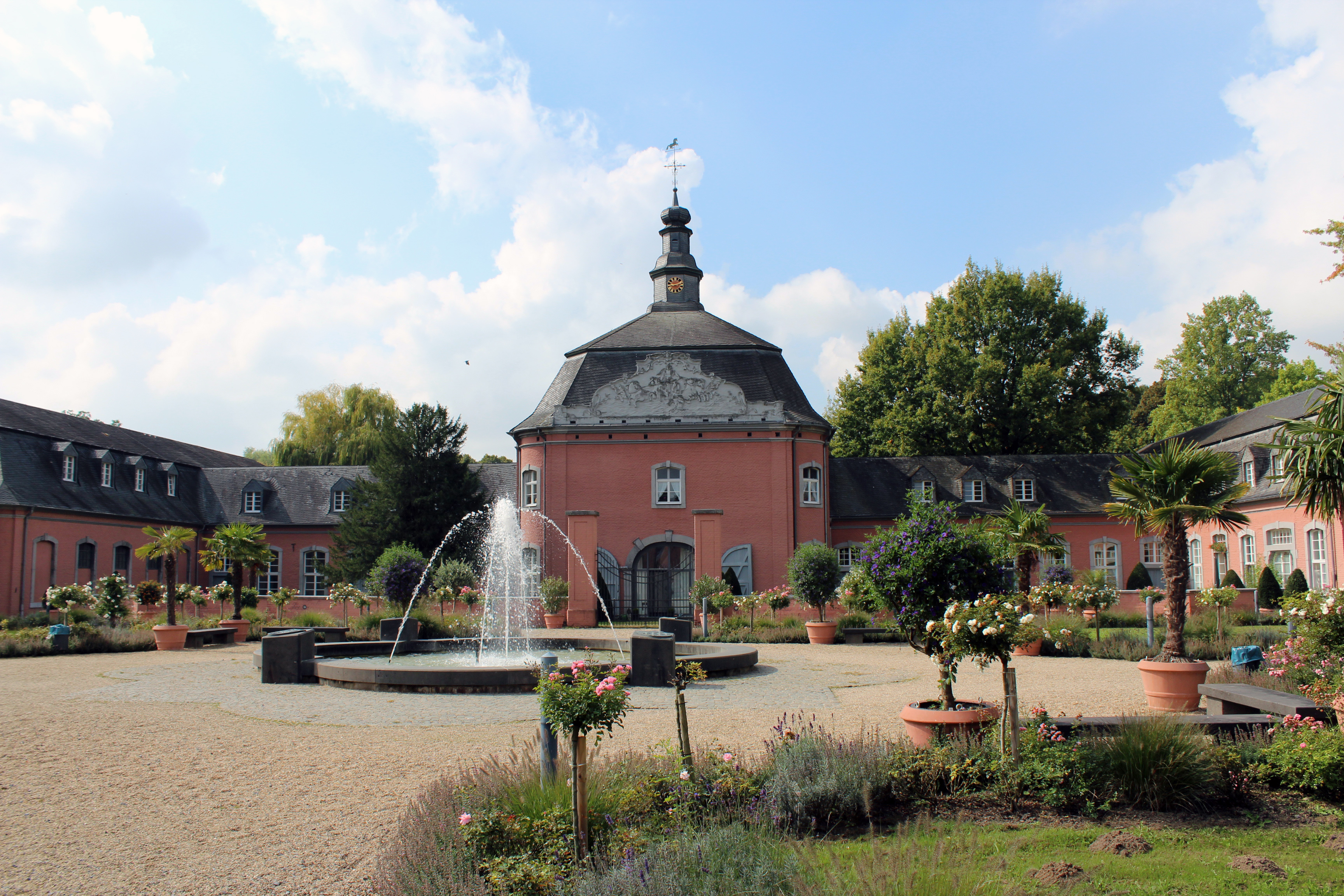
Western Wing of Schloss Wickrath

Schloss Wickrath is a moated castle complex in Wickrath. The castle is located on the river Niers. The original castle, the so-called Chateau de Wyckradt, was demolished in 1859 by the Prussian administration. The ensemble of buildings in the park, the baroque west and east wing and the so-called Landstallmeisterhaus, the residence of the former stud master, which was built in 1875, is nowadays called "Schloss Wickrath". It was built between 1746 and 1772 by count Wilhelm Otto Friedrich von Quadt. The park has the shape of a coronet of a count of the Holy Roman Empire. In 2002 the castle was part of Euroga2002.
