= Comtois =

Breed of horse

Comtois horse
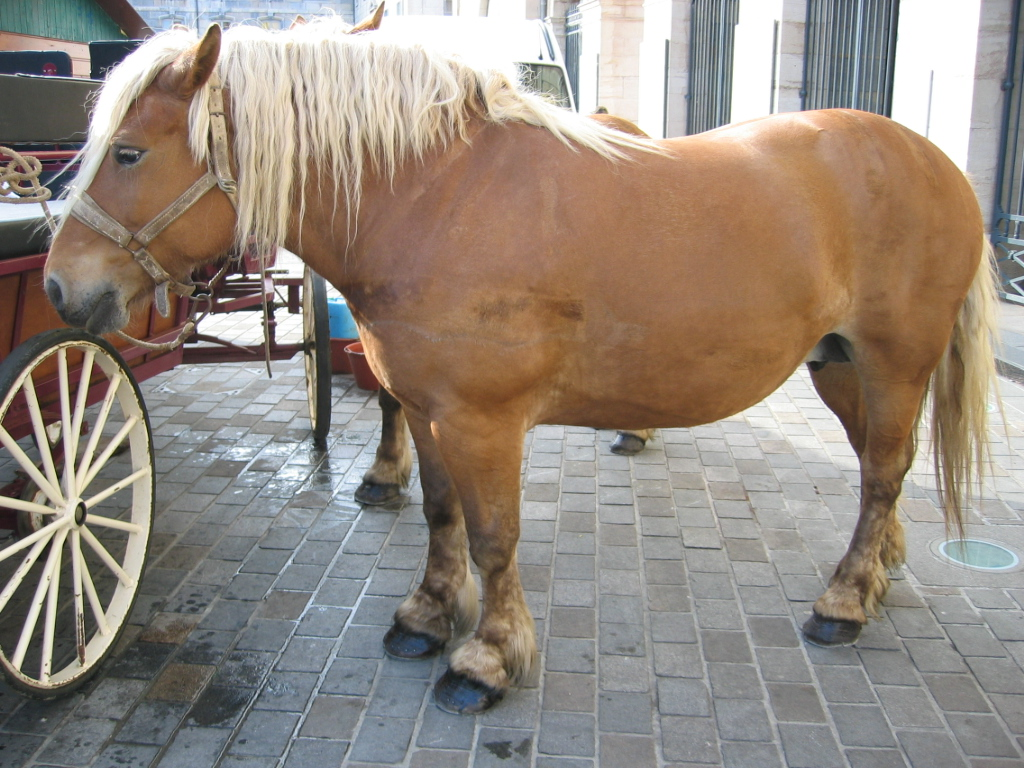

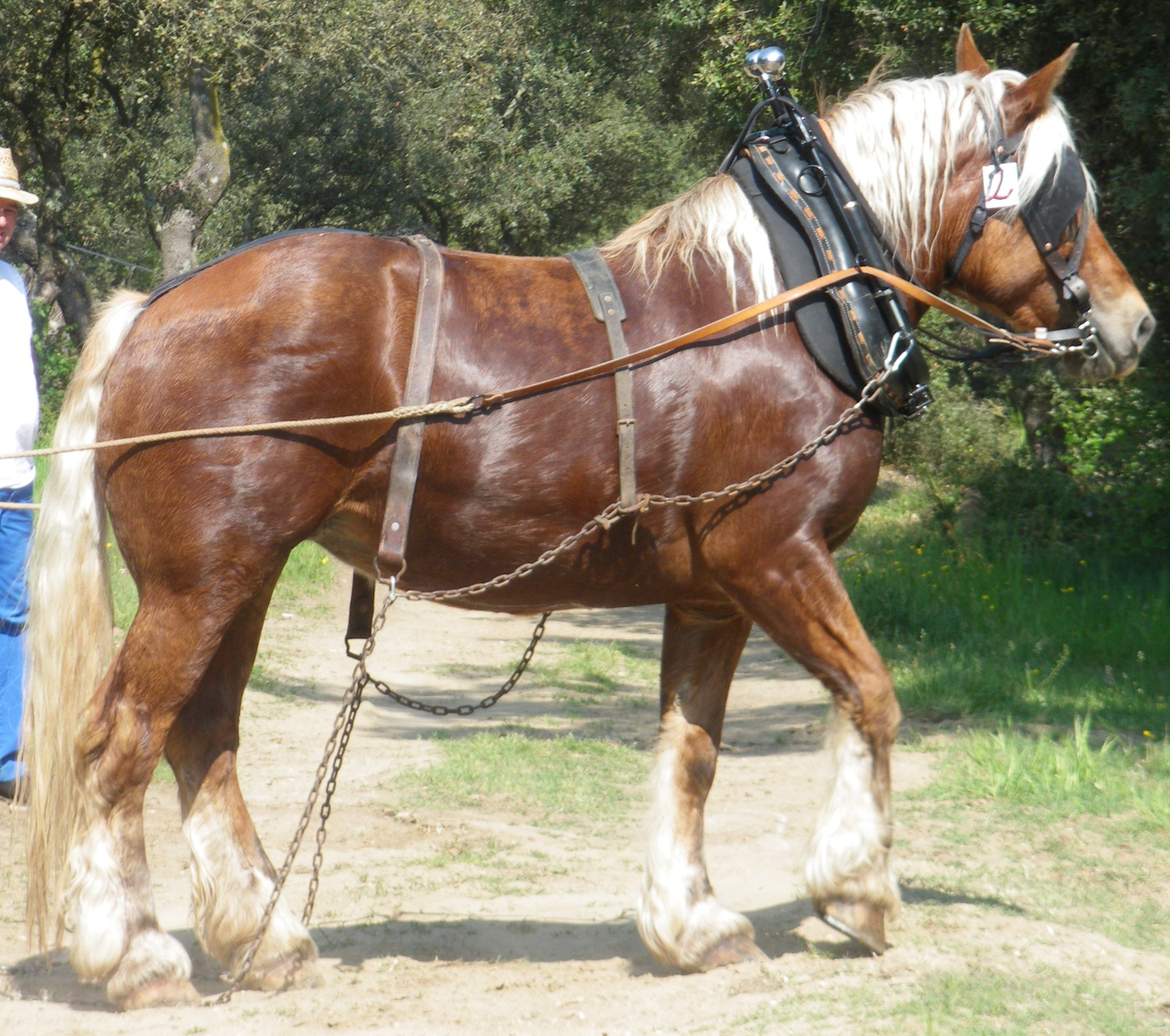
- Country of origin: France

Traits
- Distinguishing features: Light draft horse build, little feathering, chestnut with flaxen mane and tail

Breed standards
- Association Nationale du Cheval de Trait Comtois

The Comtois (French pronunciation: [kɔ̃twa]) is a draft horse that originated in the Jura Mountains on the border between France and Switzerland.

== Characteristics ==
The Comtois is a light draft horse, with a large head, straight neck, stocky and powerful body and deep girth. They have long, straight backs and short, strong legs with a little feathering and muscular hindquarters. The Comtois sometimes shows a tendency towards sickle hocks. These horses are generally bay silver, but they can also be black silver, bay, black, and chestnut. They usually stand 1.50–1.65 metres (14.3–16.1 hands) high and weigh 650–800 kg (1,430–1,760 lb).

== History ==
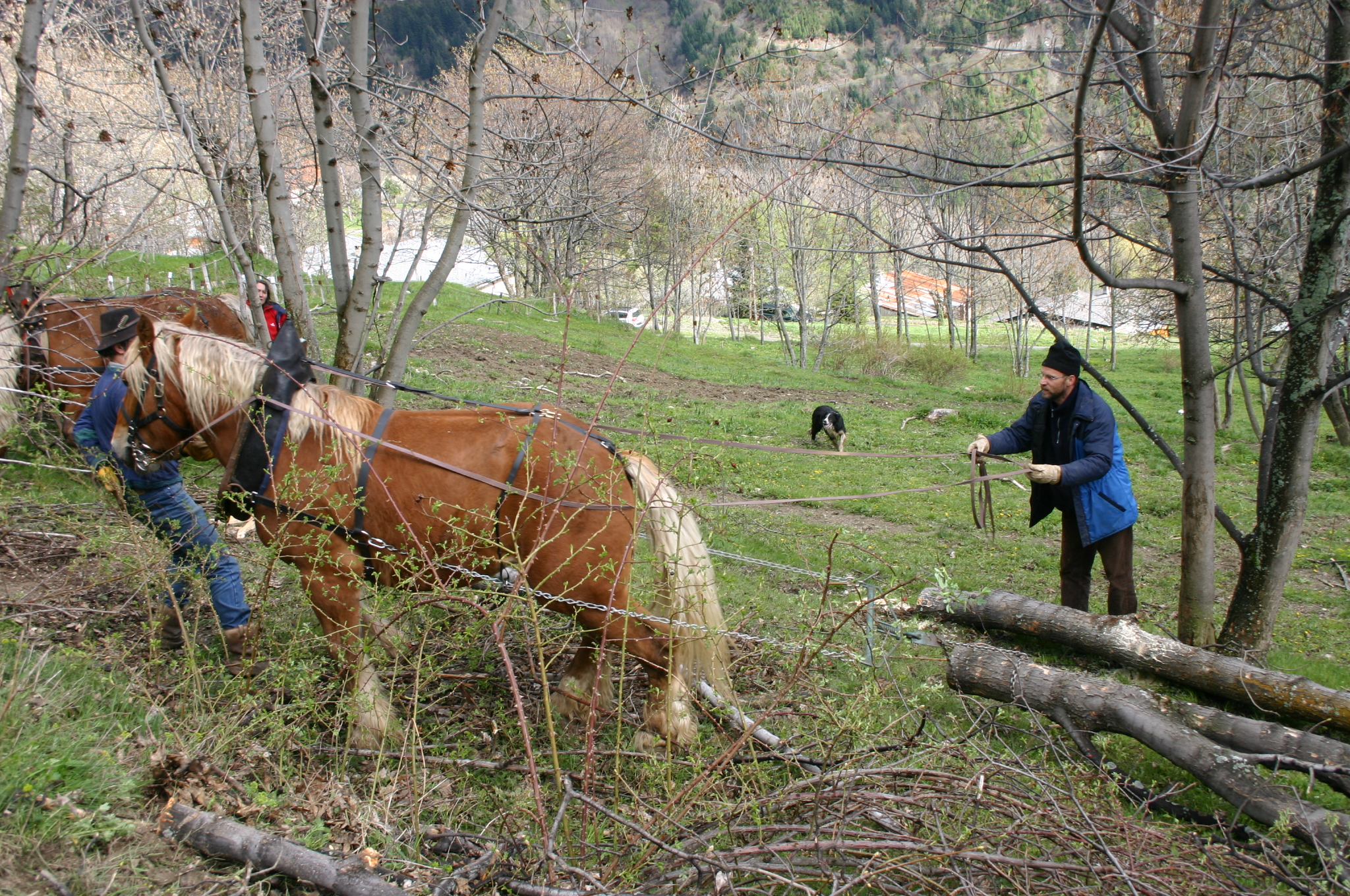
Comtois horses being used for logging

The Comtois horse breed is an old breed of horse that is believed to have descended from horses brought by the Burgundians of northern Germany to France during the fourth century. It is believed that they have been bred in Franche-Comté and in the Jura Mountains since the sixth century. In the Middle Ages they were used as war horses. They were bred in Franche-Comté and in the Jura Mountains In the 19th century, other draft horses such as the Norman, Boulonnais, and Percheron were bred into the Comtois, and more recently the Ardennes was used to produce a stronger horse with better legs. Today, they are second only to the Belgian Draught in number in France.

== Uses ==
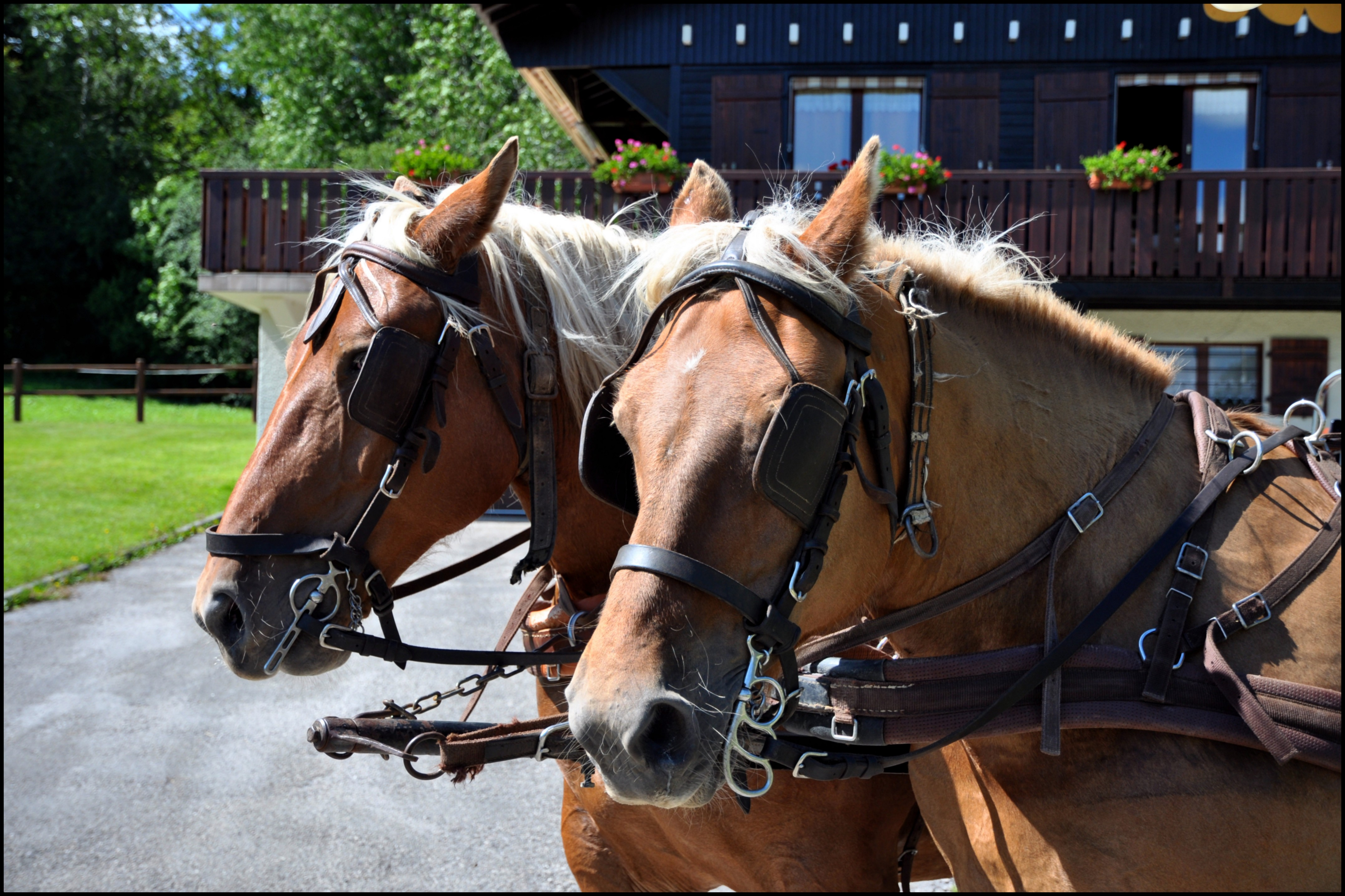
Comtois horse in harness

In the sixteenth century, these horses were used as a cavalry and artillery horse, and were present in the armies of Louis XIV and later Napoleon Bonaparte. The Comtois is used today for hauling wood in the pine forests of the Jura in the mountainous regions of the Massif Central, and for working in the vineyards in the Arbois area. They are also bred for the French horsemeat industry.

== See also ==
- List of French horse breeds
