= Ardennais =

Breed of draught horse from Belgium, France and Luxembourg

Ardennes horse
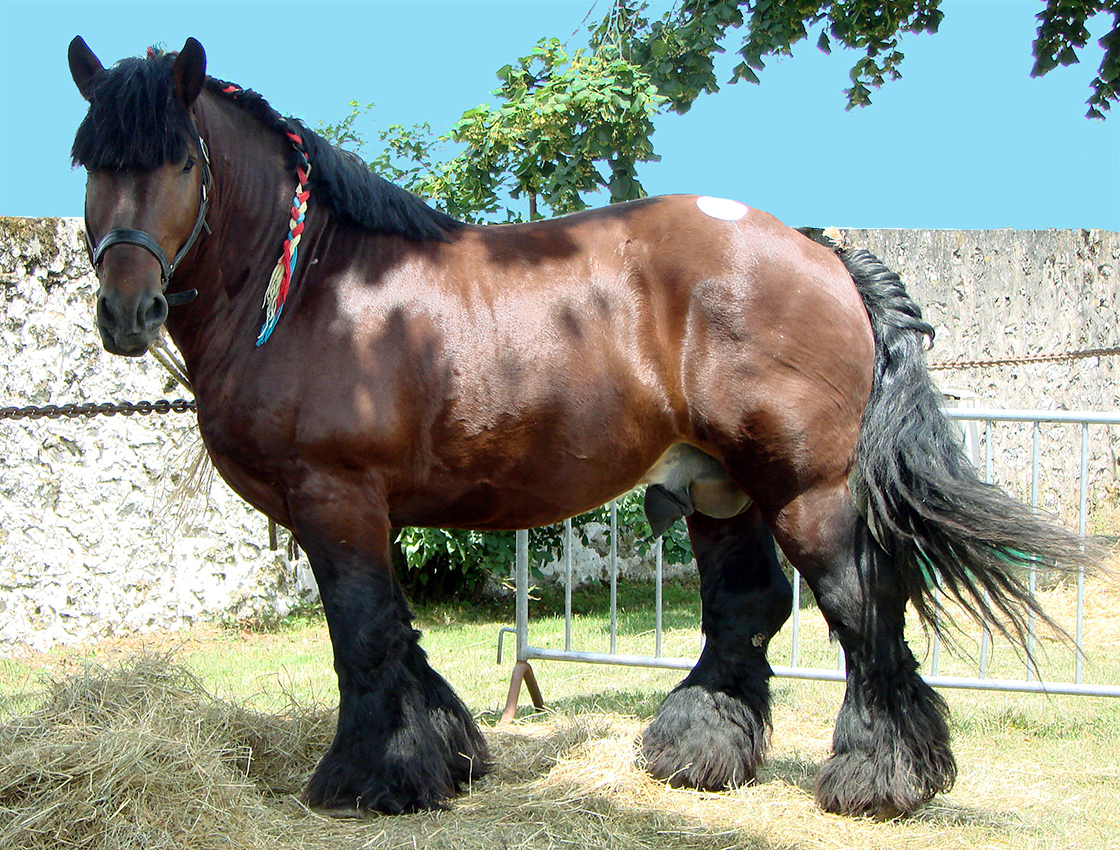

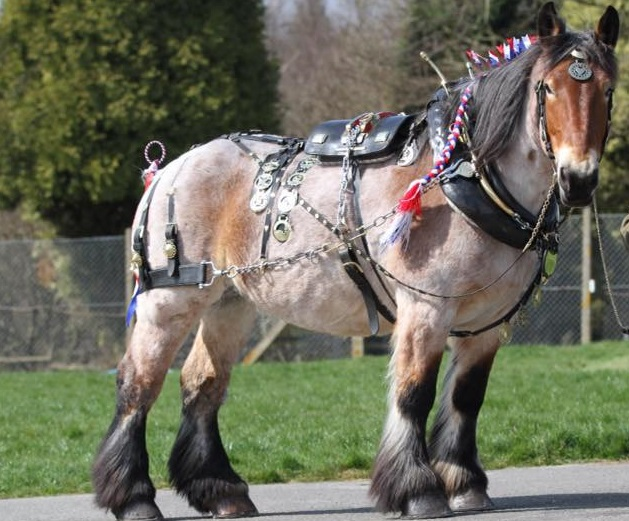
- Other names: Ardennes; French Ardennais; Belgian Ardennes; Cheval de Trait Ardennais
- Country of origin: Belgium; France; Luxembourg

Traits
- Distinguishing features: Draft horse breed

Breed standards
- Ardennes Draft Horse Studbook (Belgium); Union of Breeders of Ardennes Horses (France); Haras Nationaux (France)

The Ardennais or Ardennes is one of the oldest breeds of draft horse, and originates from the Ardennes area in Belgium, Luxembourg, and France. They are heavy-boned with thick legs and are used for draft work.

Their history reaches back to Ancient Rome, and throughout the years blood from several other breeds has been added to the Ardennes, although only the Belgian breed had any significant impact. The first Ardennes were imported to the United States in the early 20th century, and the first breed registry was established in Europe in 1929. The horses have been used throughout history as war horses, both as cavalry mounts and to draw artillery, and are used today mainly for heavy draft and farm work, meat production and competitive driving events. They have also been used to influence or create several other horse breeds throughout Europe and Asia.

== History ==
Their history reaches back to Ancient Rome. The Ardennes breed could be a direct descendant of the prehistoric Solutré horse, and is claimed to be descended from the type of horse described by Julius Caesar in his Commentarii de Bello Gallico. Caesar described these horses of Belgium as "rustic, hard and tireless", and recommended them for use in heavy cavalry units. The early type was used by many later Roman emperors for military applications. The breed's ancestors are thought to have been bred for 2,000 years on the Ardennes plains, and it is one of the oldest documented European heavy draft breeds. In the Roman era, the breed stood only around 14 hands (56 inches, 142 cm) high. Later, Napoleon added Arabian blood to increase stamina and endurance and used the breed in his Russian campaign. In 1780, the breed still stood only 1.42 to 1.52 metres (14.0 to 15.0 hands) and weighed around 500 kilograms (1,100 lb).

Percheron, Boulonnais and Thoroughbred blood were also added, although they had little impact. In the nineteenth century, Belgian draft blood was added to give the breed the heavier conformation it has today. The extra weight and size was desired to turn the breed into a very heavy draft breed, after their role as an artillery horse had diminished through the advent of mechanization, as well as a desire for a meat animal. The breed increased in size from an average of 550 kilograms (1,210 lb) to their current weight, which at the same time had the consequence of reducing their vigor and endurance. The first breed registry was established in Europe in 1929. Today there are 3 separate studbooks in France, Belgium and Luxembourg, although there is extensive interbreeding between all three. The Ardennes Horse Society of Great Britain was also formed in the late 20th century to preserve and promote Ardennes horses in Great Britain, but today is not recognized as a studbook or passport issuing organization by the British government and may not exist in any form.

The first Ardennes were imported to the United States in the early 20th century, but it is still not known precisely when. Originally, when imported to the United States, Ardennes horses were eligible for registration with the now-defunct National French Draft Horse Association of America or French Draft Horse Society. This organization published a stud book and registered six individual French draft breeds as belonging to a single breed, combining the information so that no totals of individual breeds are known. Many of these horses were imported to the United States with their breed being considered simply "French draft" and no individual type being specified. Some Ardennes horses imported to the United States before 1917 were called Belgians when they were imported and subsequently registered as Belgians. Ardennes horses have continued to be imported into the United States from Belgium, with imports occurring as late as 2004.

== Characteristics ==
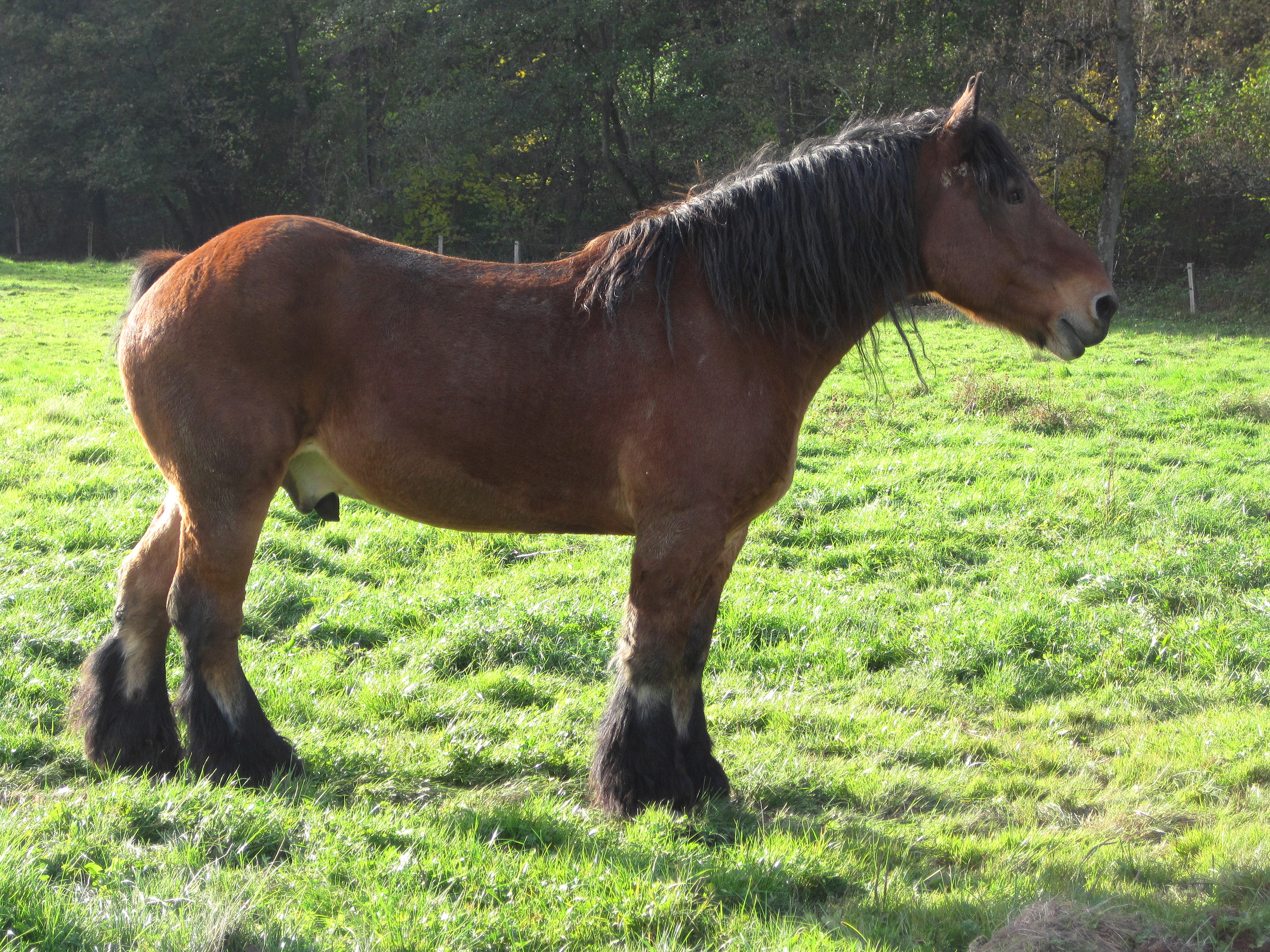

In France, Ardennes stallions stand about 1.62 metres (16 hands) high, and mares about 1.60 metres (15.3 hands), while in Belgium these are the maximum allowable heights. They weigh 700 to 1,000 kilograms (1,500 to 2,200 lb). Their heads are heavy, with a broad face and a straight or slightly convex profile. Their conformation is broad and muscular, with a compact body, short back, and short, sturdy legs with strong joints. Their fetlocks are feathered. Their coats may be bay, roan, chestnut, gray, or palomino. Bay and roan are the two most common colors. Black is very rare and is excluded from registration. White markings are small, usually restricted to a star or blaze. The breed matures early, and they are said to be easy keepers, economical to feed despite their size. The Ardennes is a free-moving, long-striding breed, despite their compact body structure.

== Uses ==
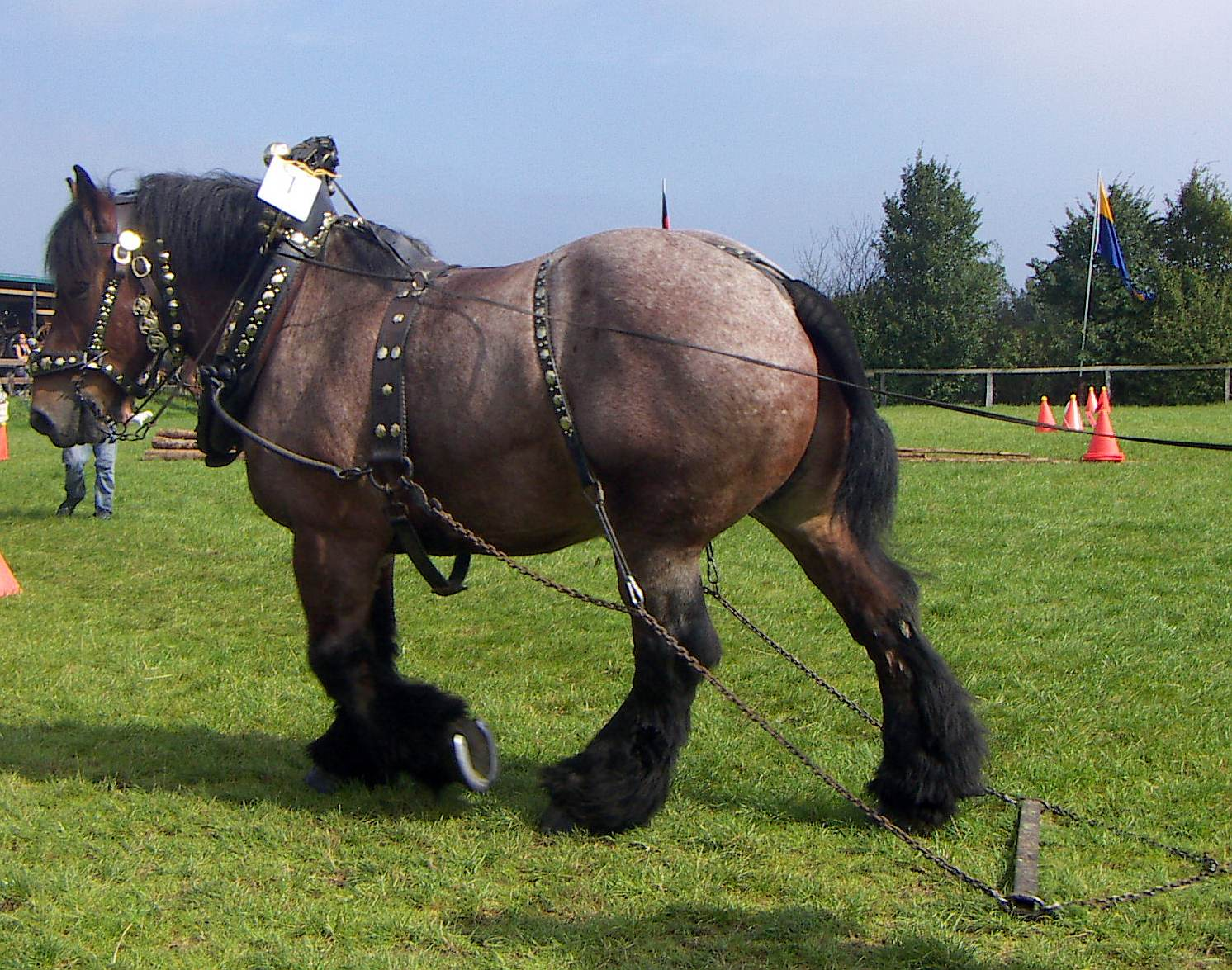
An Ardennes horse in harness

Horses from the Ardennes region were used as war horses in the Crusades in the 11th century by knights led by Godfrey of Bouillon. They were used during the 17th century by Marshal Turenne as remounts for his cavalry. In the French Revolution, they were considered to be the best artillery horse available, due to their temperament, stamina and strength. Napoleon used large numbers of Ardennes horses to pull artillery and transport supplies during his 1812 Russian campaign. They were said to be the only breed used by Napoleon that was hardy enough to withstand the winter retreat from Moscow, which they did while pulling a large amount of the army's wagon train. They were also used to pull artillery in World War I, when they were depended upon by the French and Belgian armies. Their calm, tolerant disposition, combined with their active and flexible nature, made them an ideal artillery horse. The breed was considered so useful and valuable that when the Germans established the Commission for the Purchase of Horses in October 1914 to capture Belgian horses, the Ardennes was one of two breeds specified as important, the other being the Brabant.

Today, the breed is used mainly for meat, due to its extensive musculature. Horse meat is a dietary staple in many European countries, including France, Belgium, Germany and Switzerland. However, they are increasingly used for farm, forest and leisure work. Their nimble action, stamina and good temper make them increasingly used for competitive driving across Europe, and they have also been used as mounts for therapeutic horseback riding. The breed is known for its ability to work in rough, hilly terrain.

Ardennes horses have been used as foundation bloodstock to develop several other draft horse breeds and subgroups. These include the Baltic Ardennes and Russian Heavy Draft. The Swedish Ardennes is well established in that country, where it is in demand for use in forestry. It was first recognized as a separate sub-group in the 19th century, but today is considered a separate breed, even though its ancestry is entirely from the Ardennes horses of Belgium and France. Another closely related breed is the Auxois. Ardennes horses were also used in the 1920s to improve the Comtois by adding size. Along with the Breton and the Anglo-Norman, the Ardennes horse was used to create the Sokolski horse. Similarly, the Trait Du Nord was created through a mixture of Ardennes and Belgian blood.

== See also ==
- Pfalz-Ardenner
- List of French horse breeds
