= Tori horse =

Breed of horse

Tori
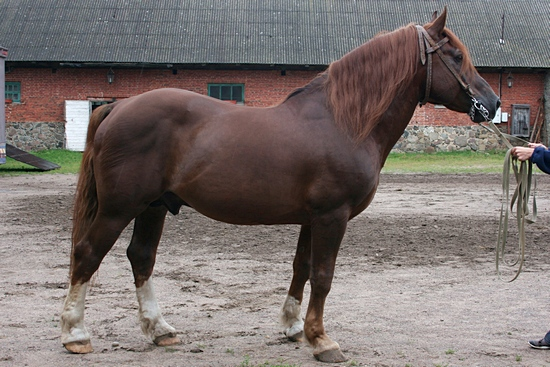
- The old-type Tori
- Country of origin: Estonia

The Tori (Estonian: tori hobune) is a horse originating in continental Estonia.

== Characteristics ==
The Tori comes mainly in the colors black, bay, palomino, chestnut and liver chestnut. Today's Tori is a harness horse that has a clean and solid build. It has a large to medium-sized head, a shortened poll, a neck that is medium in length and fleshy, withers that are average in height, a back that is long and flat, a loin that is broad as well as a croup that is broad, and the horse is well muscled. The Tori has a very broad and deep chest, and limbs that are clean and properly set. Tori stallions at the studs are usually 162 cm high at the withers. This breed has a high fertility ratio, with 86 foals per 100 mares.

== History ==
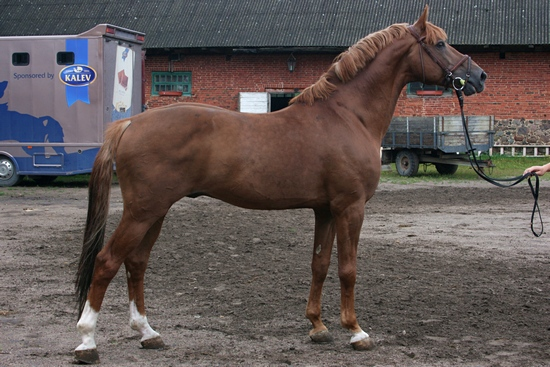
The sport horse type, which is lighter in build.

From 1890 to 1950, this breed was developed in Estonia at the stud in Tori, Pärnumaa. It was developed by crossing native Estonian mares with European crossbred stallions. This breed was mainly founded by a stallion named Hetman, whose sire was Stewart, a crossbreed of a Norfolk Trotter and an Anglo-Norman mare. The Tori breed was formed by breeding Hetman and his sons. Thus, a valuable breeding nucleus rapidly formed, that slowed as signs of inbreeding depression were found in the 1930s. This deteriorated performance and robustness. To eliminate this inbreeding depression, Toris were crossed with Breton Post-horse stallions, and as a result, the massive type of Tori became widespread while the quality of the gaits declined. The need for a combination of utility and sporting qualities in horse led to crossings with Hanoverian, Holstein and Trakehner stallions. Recent horse breeders have been trying mainly to get a very light sport horse-type of horse, resulting in a rapid loss of purebred Tori.

Mihkel Ilmjärv, who worked as the head of the Tori Horse Farm in 1926–1947, and Arved Toots, who was founder and head of the Aravete Tori Horse Farm in 1955–1992, have great merits in breeding the Tori horse breed. In 1990, there were 55 farms in Estonia where Tori horses were bred, 15 of these were first class breeding farms.

Since 04.06.2012 exists a separate studbook for the purebred and so called Old-Tori horses to stabilize and confirm the small number of these horses. In spring 2014 are fewer than 100 purebred Old-Tori horses left in Estonia.

== Associations ==
- Tori Horse Society
- Estonian Horse Breeders Society

Old-Tori Horse Society
