= Swedish Ardennes =

Swedish horse breed

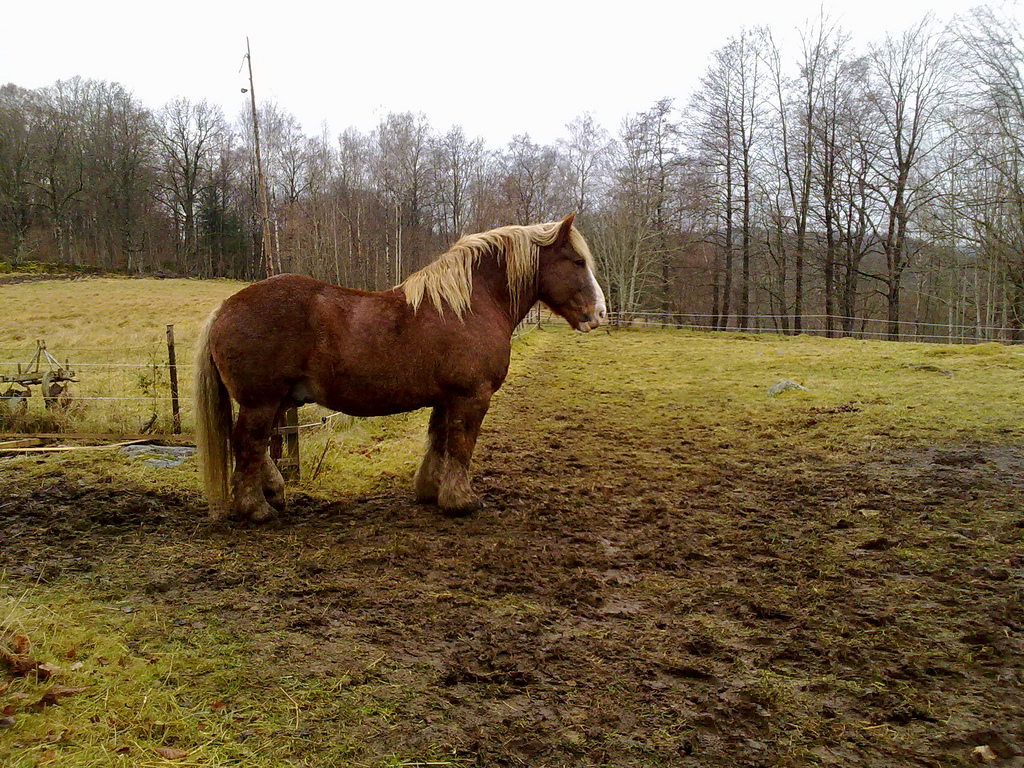

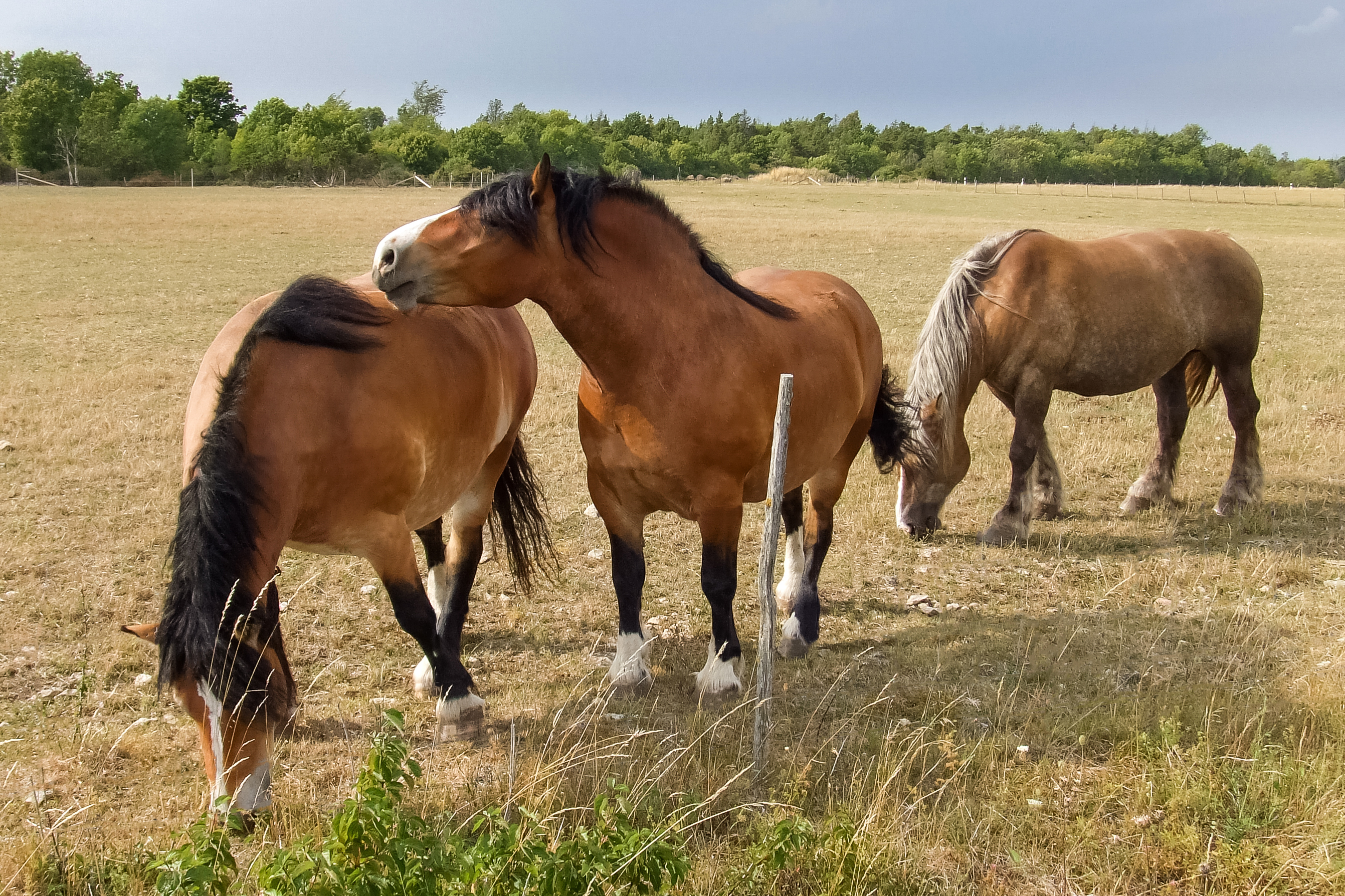
- Conservation status: Endangered
- Other names: Svensk Ardenner
- Country of origin: Sweden

Traits
- Weight: 500-800 kg or more
- Height: 152-165cm (15.2-16 hands)
- Color: Brown, bay, black, chestnut, silver brown/black and variants of grey, tan or roan
- Distinguishing features: Medium-sized draft horse breed

Breed standards
- Avelsföreningen Svenska Ardennerhästen

The Swedish Ardennes or Svensk Ardenner is a medium-size, heavyweight draft horse. It was established in Sweden during the late 19th century to satisfy farmers' demand for horses suitable for agriculture, and continues to be bred today.

== Characteristics ==
The Swedish Ardennes is 15.2 to 16 hands (62 to 64 inches, 157 to 163 cm) and weighs 1,200 to 1,600 pounds (540 to 730 kg). It has a heavy head with a straight profile; a short, thick neck; a short back with a wide chest, and well-muscled shoulders. The Swedish Ardennes has a muscular, compact body with stout legs, and some feathering on its legs. The predominant colors are black, bay, and chestnut. It is hardy and can withstand extremes in weather. Swedish Ardennes horses are very strong and willing workers and easy keepers. They are also known for their longevity, having an even but not sluggish temperament, and good overall health.

== Breed history ==
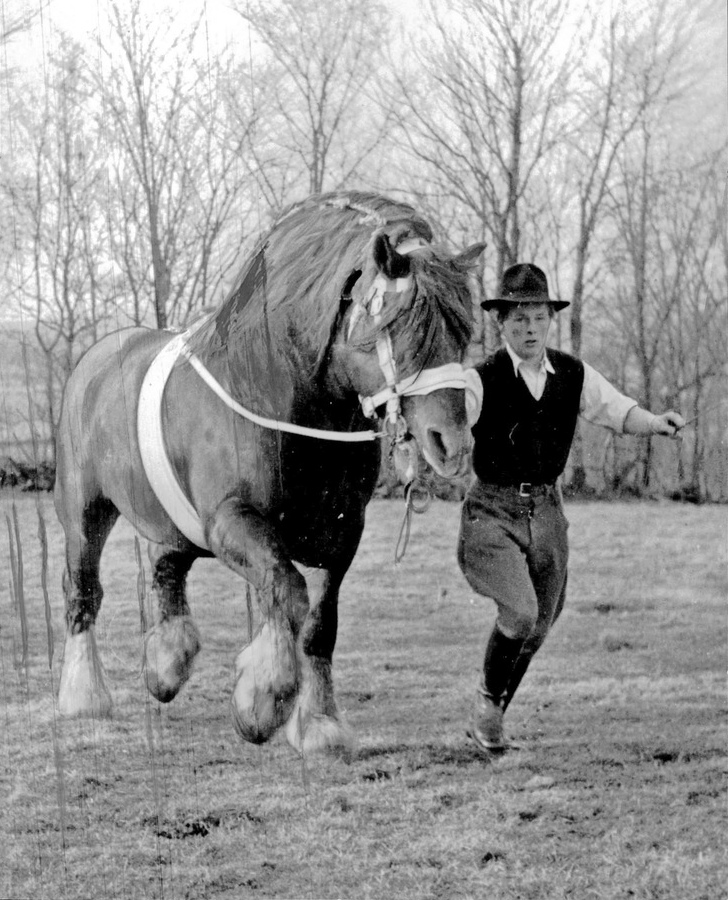
Swedish Ardennes, 1945

Swedish Ardennes horses were developed by crossing imported Ardennes horses (a heavy draft breed from Belgium and northern France) with the North Swedish Horse. In 1872, Count C.G. Wrangel began importing Ardennes horses and by 1880, Ardennes imports and crossbreds had made inroads across south and central Sweden. The goal was to improve on the size and strength of native Swedish horses; to this end, a studbook was established in 1901.

The population declined in the early 1900s as agriculture was modernized with machinery. In the 1970s, the Swedish Ardennes still makes up the largest proportion of Sweden's registered purebred stallions.

Serious conservation efforts started to take place in the 1970s and 1980s, and as of 2025 the responsibility of preservation is managed by the Swedish Board of Agriculture. The breed registry is managed by Avelsföreningen Svenska Ardennerhästen (Swedish Ardennes Horse Breeding Association), and horses must pass strict evaluations and DNA tests to qualify for registration. In 2018 there were about 700 registered mares in Sweden, and in 2020 159 foals were born.

== Uses ==
Although farming is now done with machinery (except on remote hill farms), the Swedish Ardennes is still popular as a cart horse; it is also used for hauling timber in mountain areas inaccessible by machinery.
