= New Altai =

Russian breed of meat horse in the Altai region

Charysh Altai
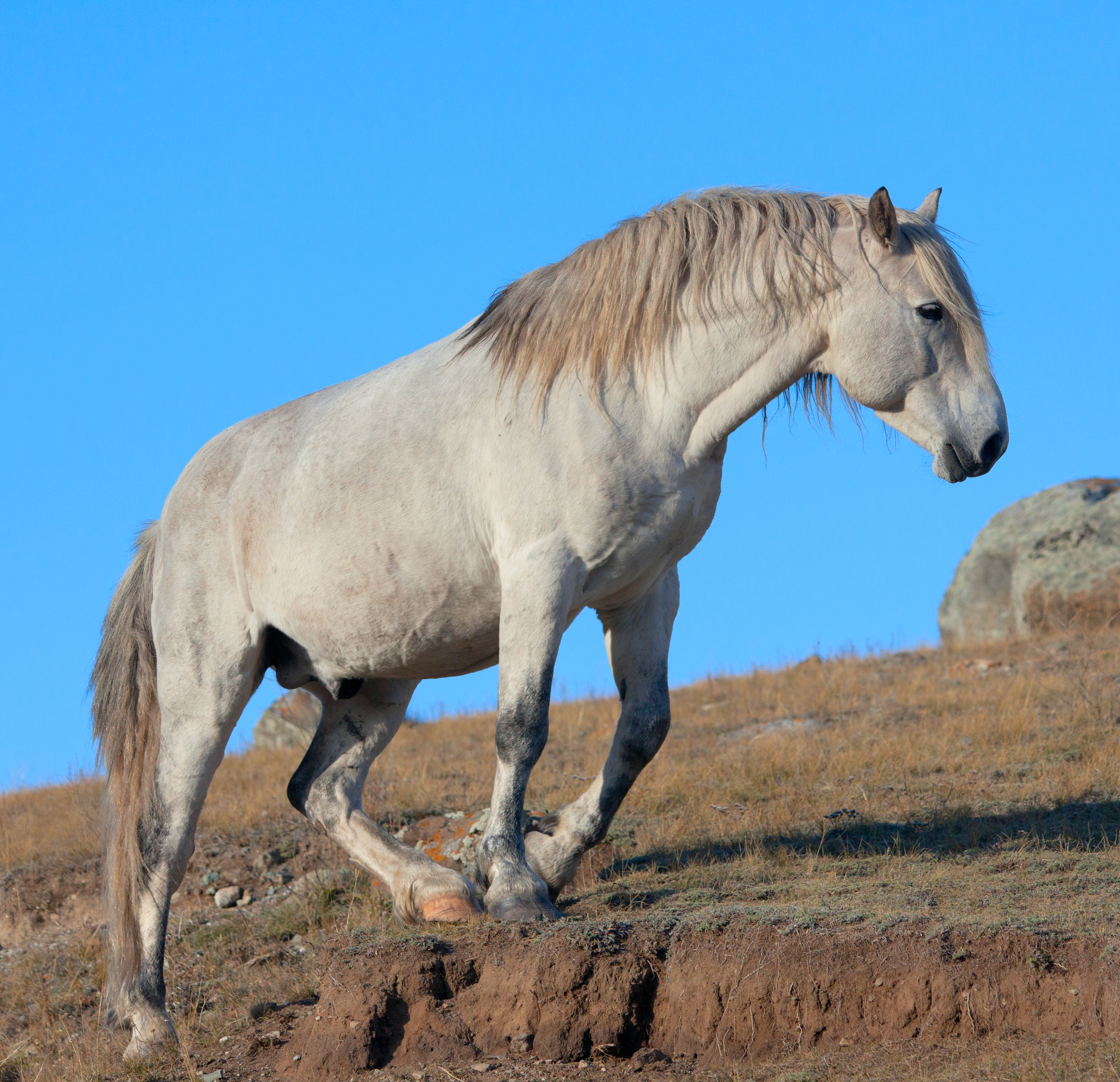
- Gray Charysh Altai in the Chuya steppe, Altai Mountains.
- Country of origin: Russia
- Type: Meat horse
- Use: Meat, saddle and traction

Traits
- Size: From 1.50 m to 1.57 m
- Weight: Up to 670 kg
- Hooves: Sometimes flimsy

The New Altai (Russian: Новоалтайская), also known as Charysh Altai and Chara Altai, is a Russian breed of meat horse. Created by Soviet zootechnicians for breeding in Russia's Altai region, it is more or less closely related to the draft horse, its selection focusing on increasing its meat weight without losing hardiness. Although its origins date back to the 1920s, the breed was truly selected from 1978 onwards, before becoming official in 2000.

A muscular horse with an imposing head, the New Altai is also bred for its milk, and can be used for equitation and light traction. Although its breeding has spread to Kazakhstan, it is considered a rare breed, with around 2,000 individuals recorded in 2016.

== Name ==
Various names are used for this breed. In Russian, it is named Новоалтайская / Novoaltaiskaya, translated into English as "New Altai". The breed was formalized in 2000. Russian zootechnicians notably used this name in a scientific publication in 2002. The Delachaux guide lists the names "Charysh", "Chara" (both erroneous transcriptions, the correct ones being "Tcharysh" and "Tchara") and " Producer of Altai" as synonymous with "New Altai". However, the 2016 edition of CAB International's English-language dictionary distinguishes Charysh from Chara, citing them as two meat varieties of the Altai breed. The DAD-IS database dissociates Novoaltaiskaya from Charysh / Chara. The latter name comes from the river of the same name.

== History ==
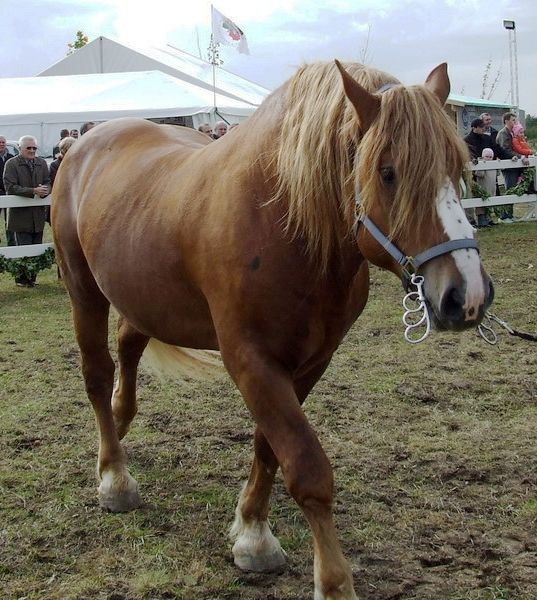
A Lithuanian Heavy Draught, one of the original breeds of the New Altai.

The New Altai is a recent creation of Russian zootechnicians, the result of complex crossbreeding. Its aim is to provide a source of food, while retaining the hardy qualities that allow it to be bred in the open air. Selection began in the 1920s. To this end, six kolkhoz in the region selected animals suitable for the breeding program. Initial trials were unsuccessful, as the intensive use of stallions from breeding farms on the local herd reduced the fertility of broodmares, as well as the natural resistance of the local breed to the climate, necessary for its extensive breeding in tabuns. To solve the problem, Russian zootechnicians selected animals from these crossbreeds, but which were adaptable to their breeding methods.

In 1978, considered to be the year in which the breed's selection really got underway, the evaluation of 3,100 horses resulted in the selection of 845 mares of all origins meeting these criteria. These were generally half-draft crosses. 140 stallions were also selected, of which only 15 belonged to a well-identified draught breed (ten Russian, two Soviet and three Lithuanian), with the Lithuanians giving the best results. There were also three Estonian trait crosses. The results of these crosses were in turn crossed with Žemaitukas stallions and trotters. Some Don and Budyonny horses influenced the Chara breed, but only to a minor extent, to lighten the skeleton and improve the quality of the feet. The Kuznetsk influence was more significant.

In 1986, the breed had 1,716 mares and 33 stallions. At the beginning of 1989, this figure had risen to 1,620 mares.

In 2002, the creation of the breed was officially announced as complete.

== Description ==
Height ranges from 1.50 m to 1.57 m, (up to 1.56 m according to the Delachaux Guide). Weight can reach 670 kg.

The New Altai has an imposing head, strong muscles, a strong back and limbs, a very muscular croup, and a deep chest, generally broad but sometimes narrower. Its hooves can be fragile, but they have become stronger thanks to crossbreeding. There are three types: the desired (closest to the draught horse), the universal and the aboriginal (lightest). To establish the breed, aboriginal types are generally crossed with the desired type.

These horses are traditionally bred in tabuns. They are a hardy, sober breed, selected for their ability to overwinter without human supplementation. The fertility rate is between 70 and 77%.

The composition of New Altai meat has been studied.

== Uses ==
This breed was originally selected to supply horse meat, and is therefore specialized for this purpose, meeting strong economic demand both within Russia and from outside.

However, the breed has also been selected for use in equitation and for draught power. The New Altai is of major economic interest to breeders in the Altai region, as Russian zootechnicians have focused on making the breed as profitable as possible. The mares also provide milk for processing into kumis. This horse can also be used for equestrian tourism.

The New Altai has been used in crossbreeding with the Kazakh Jabe breed since 2006, in the Pavlodar region in Kazakhstan, to improve the productivity of local meat horses. This cross has produced Jabe-New Altai hybrids, with increased milk and beef productivity. In general, crossbreeding with New Altai results in a liveweight gain in foals ranging from 40 to 110 kg.

== Spread of breeding ==
The cradle of the breed is the mountainous Altai Krai region in southern Siberia. In 2008, it was decided to extend the breed to other regions of Siberia. Breeding has also spread to Kazakhstan.

The breed's numbers are not precisely known, but the 1988 census put the herd at between 100 and 1,000 head; that same year, the New Altai was listed as rare and in danger of extinction ("D" status) by the FAO. In 2002, the CAB International dictionary listed the Charysh as a rare local Siberian horse. In 2003, the census of Russian Novoaltaiskaya numbers, published on DAD-IS, was 2,110 head. In 2016, this figure was probably around 2,000.

Bonnie Lou Hendricks' study reported it as a rare and new breed.

== See also ==
- List of horse breeds
- Horses in Russia
- Altai Mountains
- Horse meat

== Bibliography ==
- Golubev, Konstantin; Golubeva, Marina (2017). Лошади. Породы, питание, содержание. Практическое руководство [Horses. Breeds, feeding, uses. Practical guide] (in Russian). Litres. ISBN 978-5-04-004096-4.
- Hendricks, Bonnie L. (2007). International Encyclopedia of Horse Breeds. University of Oklahoma Press. ISBN 978-0-8061-3884-8.
- Kosarev, A. P.; Bordunov, A. A.; Vostrikov, V. F.; Karyagin, A. D. (2002). Новая продуктивная порода лошадей « Новоалтайская » [The productive new breed of "New Altai" horses] (in Russian). Министерство с/х РФ, ГУСХ Алтайского края: Барнаул / Barnaul.
- Mason, Ian Lauder (2016). Mason's world encyclopedia of livestock breeds and breeding (6th ed.). Wallingford: CABI. ISBN 978-1-84593-466-8.
- Rousseau, Élise; Le Bris, Yann (2016). Guide des chevaux d'Europe. Paris: Delachaux et Niestlé. ISBN 978-2-603-02437-9.
