= Altai horse =

Breed of horse

Altai
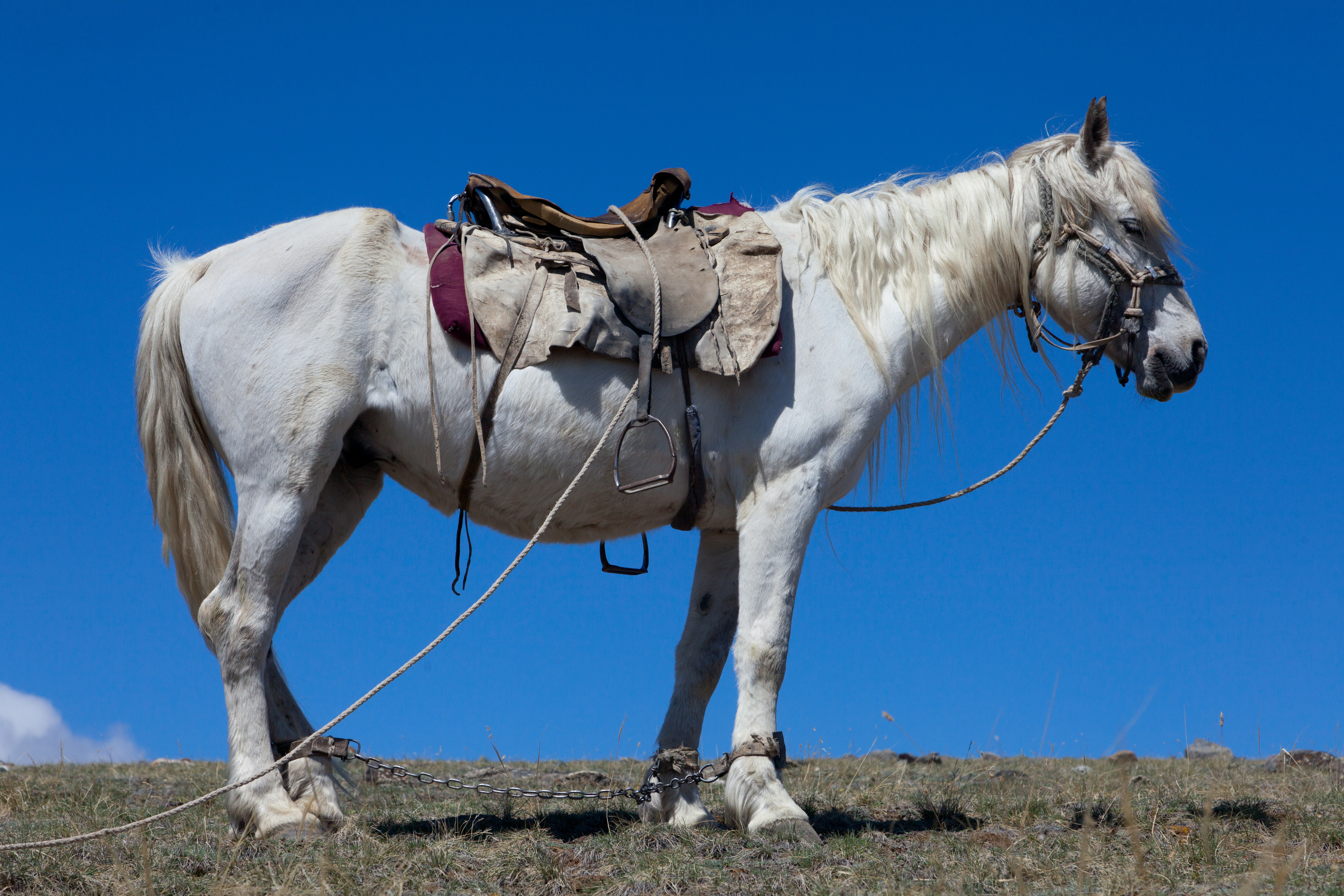
- Altai horse in the Chuya Steppe, in the Altai Mountains
- Country of origin: Central Asia

Traits
- Weight: 350-430 kg
- Height: 130 cm (12.3 h)
- Colour: Mainly chestnut, bay, and black
- Distinguishing features: Large coarse head, fleshy medium neck, long back, deep barrel, muscular croup, short straight legs

The Altai is a horse breed developed in the Altai Mountains of Central Asia. It is considered one of the oldest horse breeds in Siberia and has a rich history tied to the nomadic cultures of the region.

Altai horses are well-adapted to the harsh and rugged terrain of the Altai Mountains. They have developed sturdy and compact builds, allowing them to navigate through difficult landscapes. These horses are known for their endurance, agility, and sure-footedness, which make them suitable for various tasks, including herding, transportation, and riding.

== Characteristics ==
The Altai has a head with a slightly dished profile, set on a relatively short neck. They have a strong back, a well-developed croup, and short cannon bones. They stand an average of 13.2–13.3 hands high, and their coat colors are chestnut, bay, black, gray, and sometimes leopard spotted. In his The Book of The Horse Vesey-Fitzgerald gives the following traits of the Altai: height of 129.8 cm, body length of 104.2 cm, chest circumference of 154.0 cm, and pastern circumference of 16.8 cm. A Standard Guide to Horse and Pony Breeds provides the following characteristics of an average mare: 13 hands high, length of barrel of 140 cm, girth of 160 cm, and pastern of 17.2 cm.

Horses similar in measurement to the Altai were found in the Pazyryk burials, dating back to 3rd century BCE.

== Breed history ==
The Altai is one of the breeds of Mongol origin and was bred as a utility animal to provide transportation as well as meat, milk, fat and horsehair. Their breeding has been influenced significantly by the harsh climate in which it was developed and the need for survival on only year-round pasture grazing. They were bred for the characteristics most needed by the mountain tribesmen and nomads, including strong cardiovascular, respiratory, muscular and skeletal systems. They are also sure-footed over steep mountain trails.

Crossing Altais with other breeds usually results in larger, stronger horses that retain the healthiness and easy management of the Altai. In the past, the Altai has been crossed with Lithuanian, Russian, and Soviet Heavy Draft horses.

== See also ==
- New Altai
