= Sevastopol Zoo =

- Interactive map of Sevastopol Zoo
- Date opened: 2012
- Location: Biryuleva St, 34, Sevastopol, Ukraine

Sevastopol zoo was a private mini-zoo, the first zoo ever opened in Sevastopol, Crimea.

The zoo was founded in 2012 by Remigiyus Vrady (Russian: Ремигиюс Врадий), (Note: Remigijus is a masculine Lithuanian given name; Врадий is a surname) enthusiast in selection and breeding of animals, incumbent director of the zoo. The zoo collection was constantly growing, replenished by exchange with other zoos and purchase of animals from the kennels.

The zoo was located nearby "Kolya Pishchenko Street" station of the bus routes 109 and 20, just a few stops away from the Black Sea branch of the Moscow State University, the "Sevastopol" stadium, "Lukomorie" ecological park and the memorial complex "Malakhov Kurgan".

Since the zoo was located in the residential area, in 2021 it was demanded to be closed by the decision of the Nakhimov District Court of Sevastopol.

== Pictures ==
Zoo inhabitants

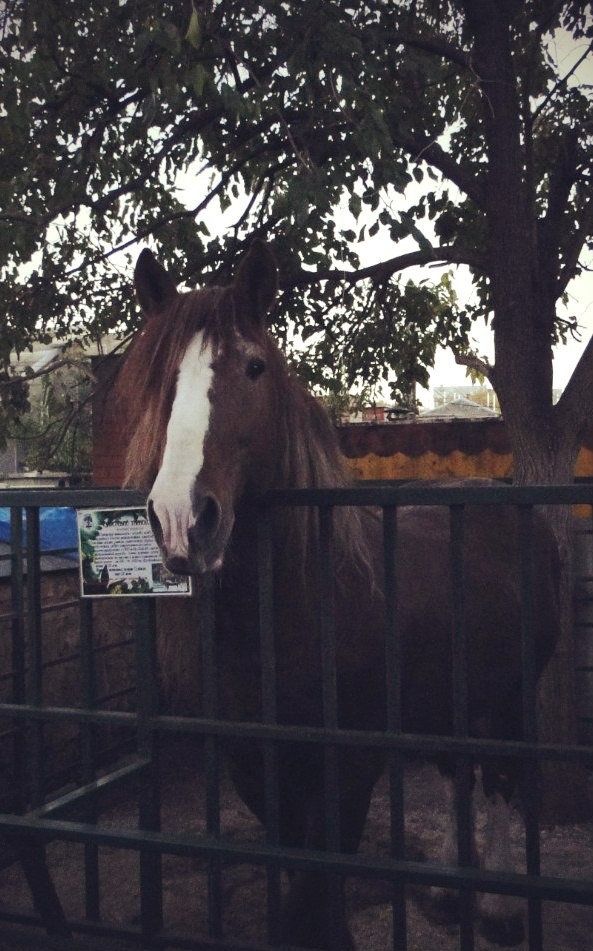
Soviet Heavy Draft, Saigak

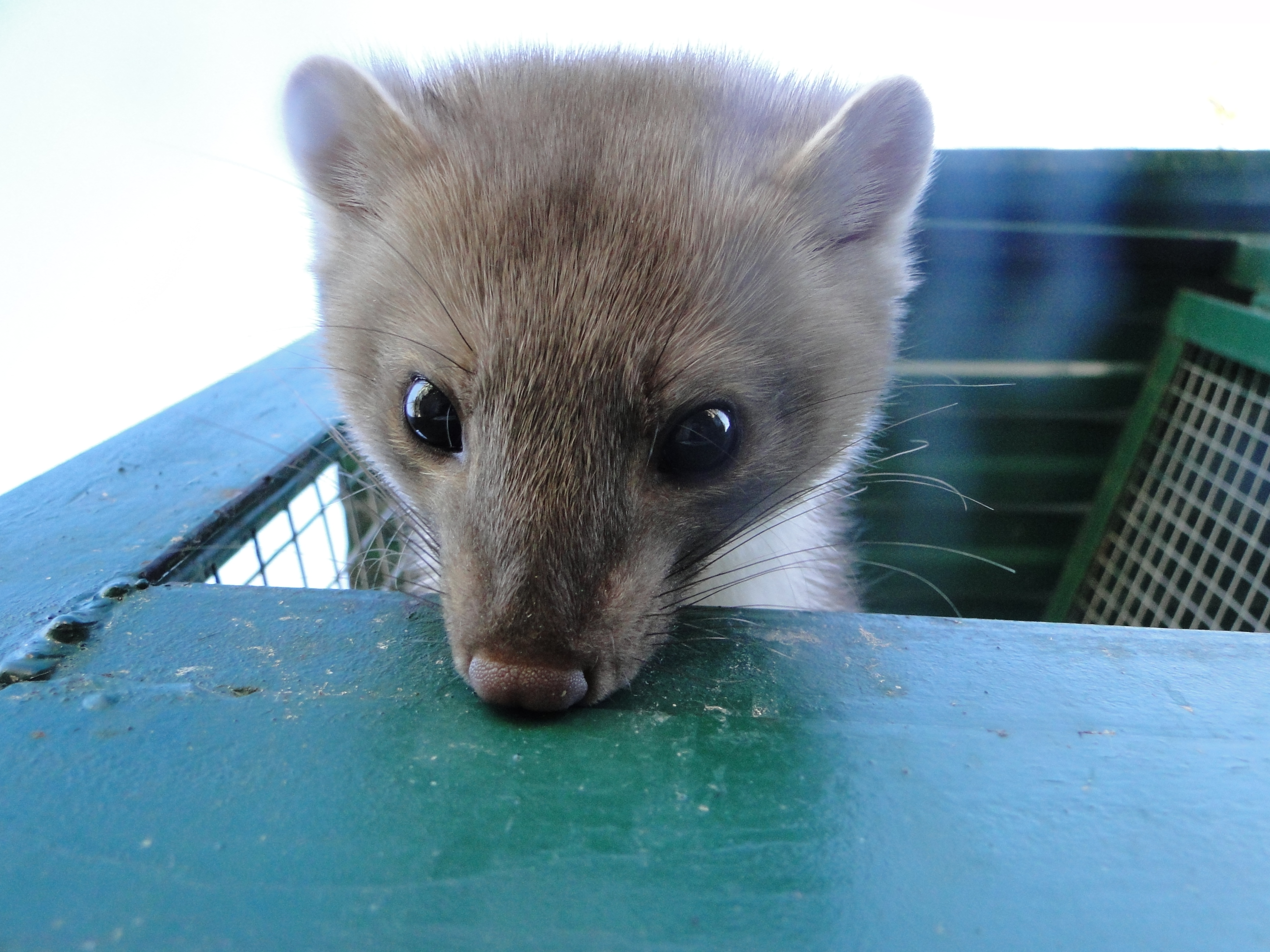
Beech marten, Martin

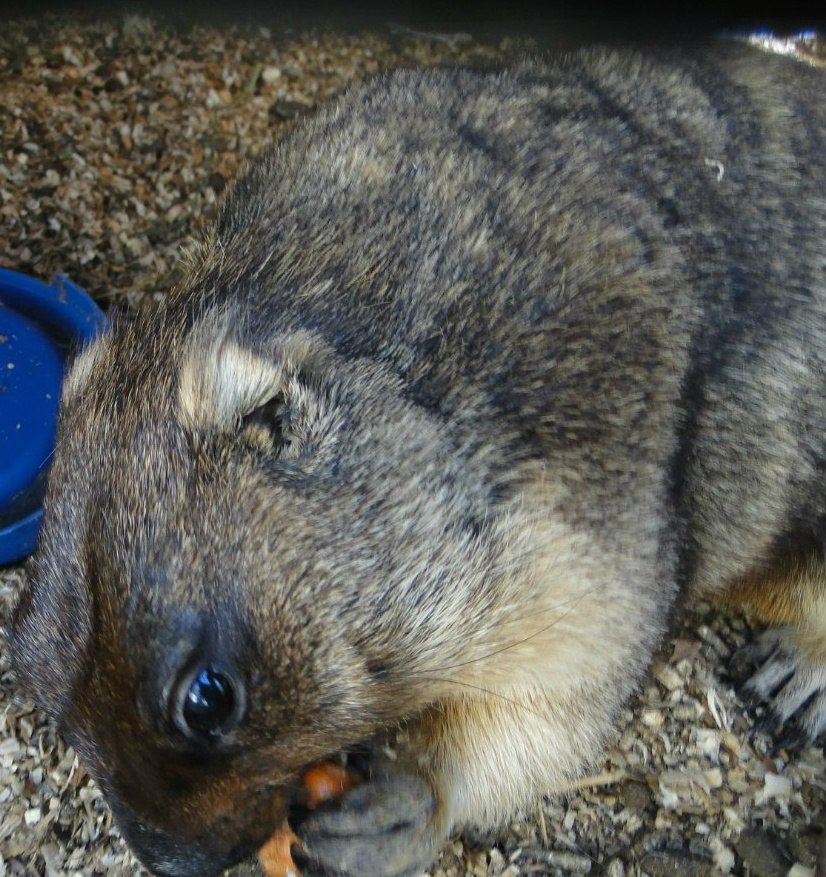
Bobak marmot, Baibak

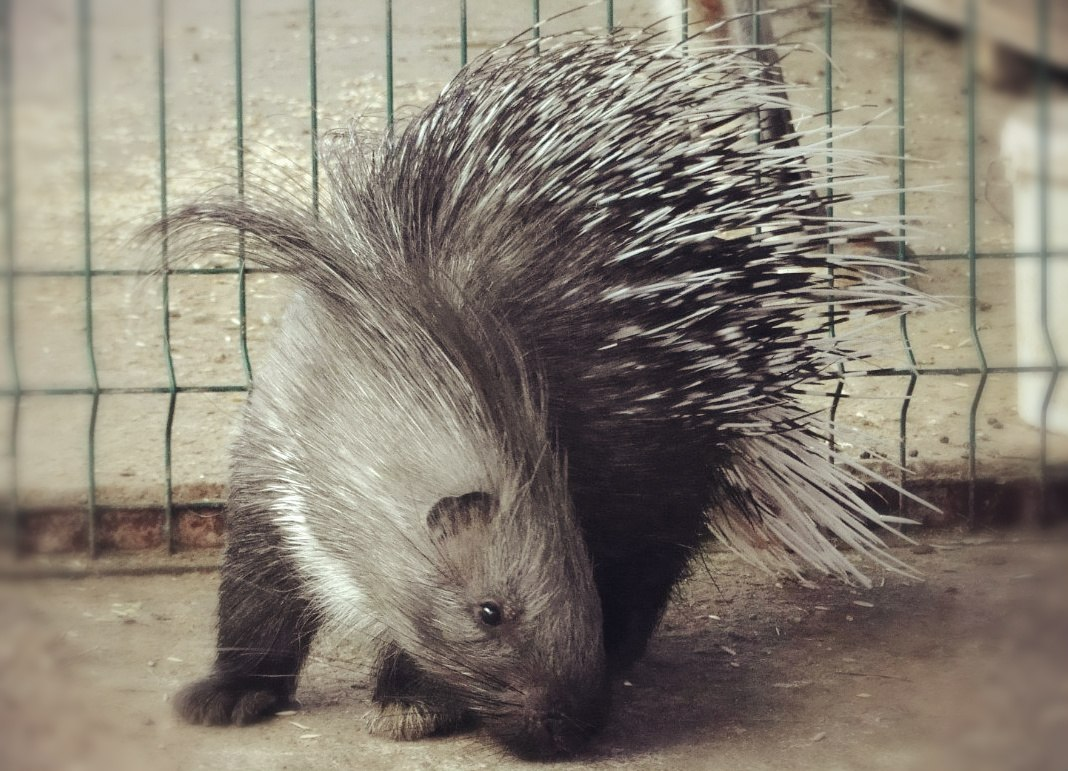
Indian porcupine

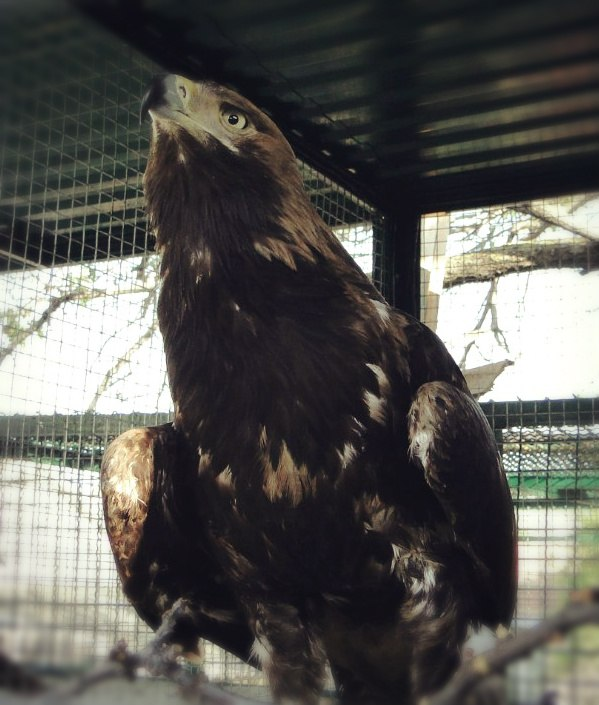
Eastern imperial eagle

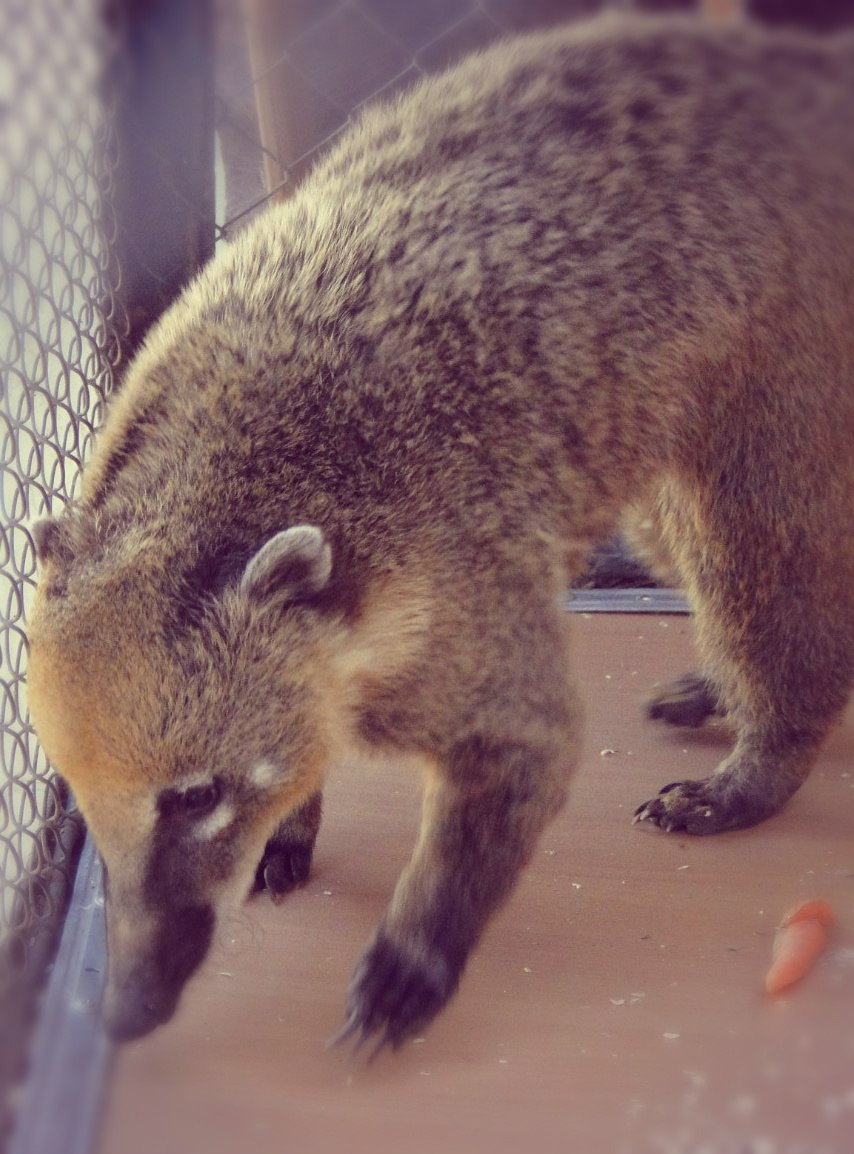
Liolik, South American coati

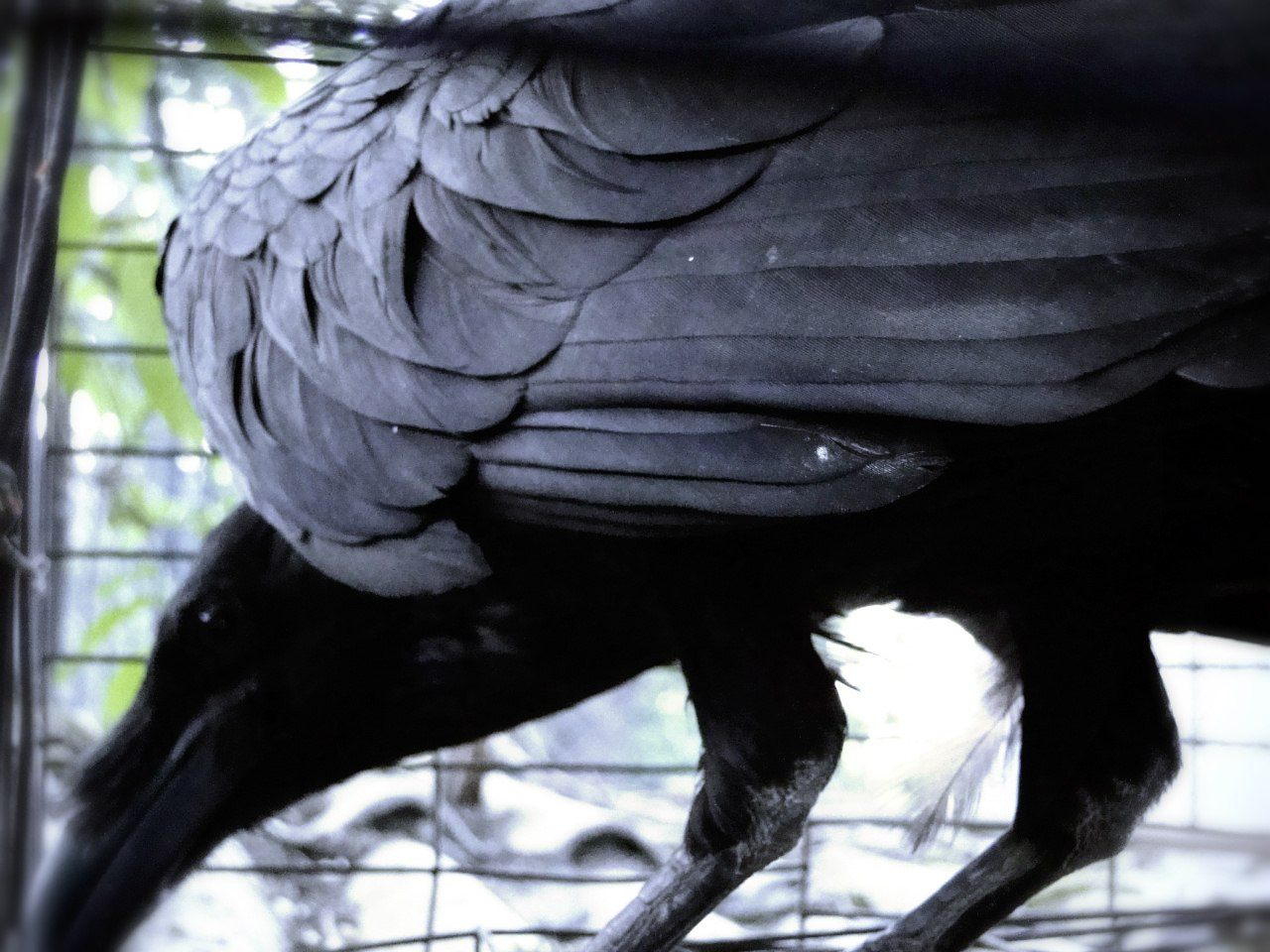
Common raven, Racen

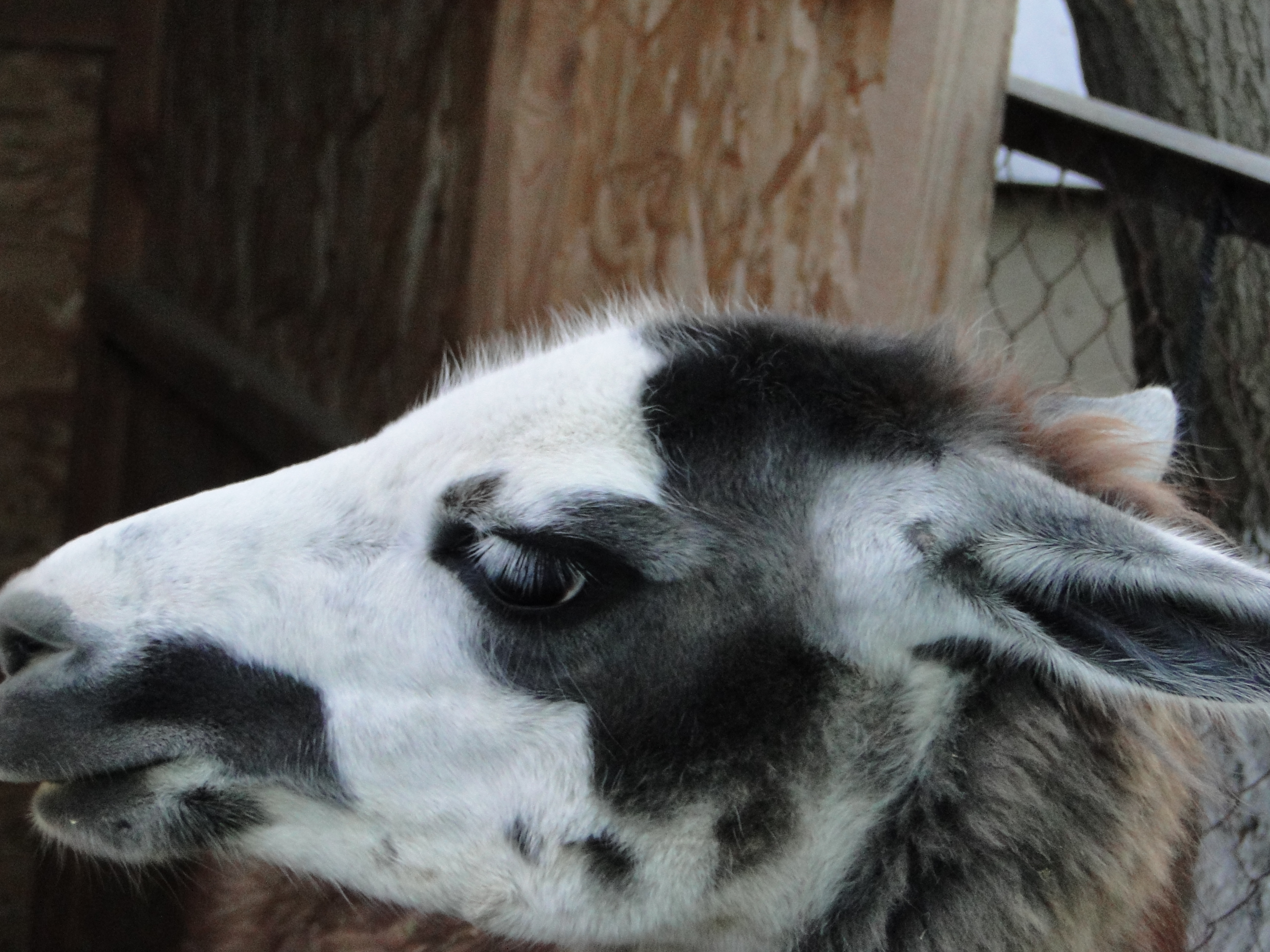
Llama, Nazar

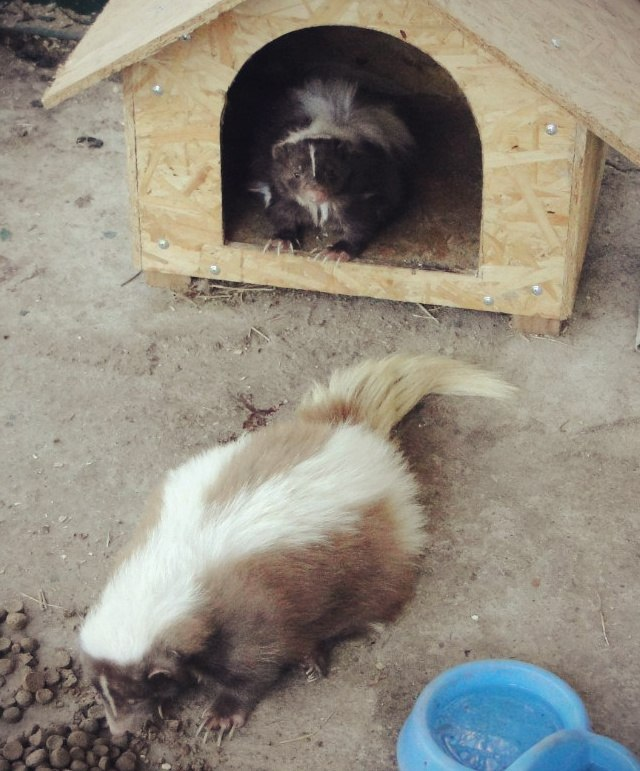
Chocolate skunks from Germany

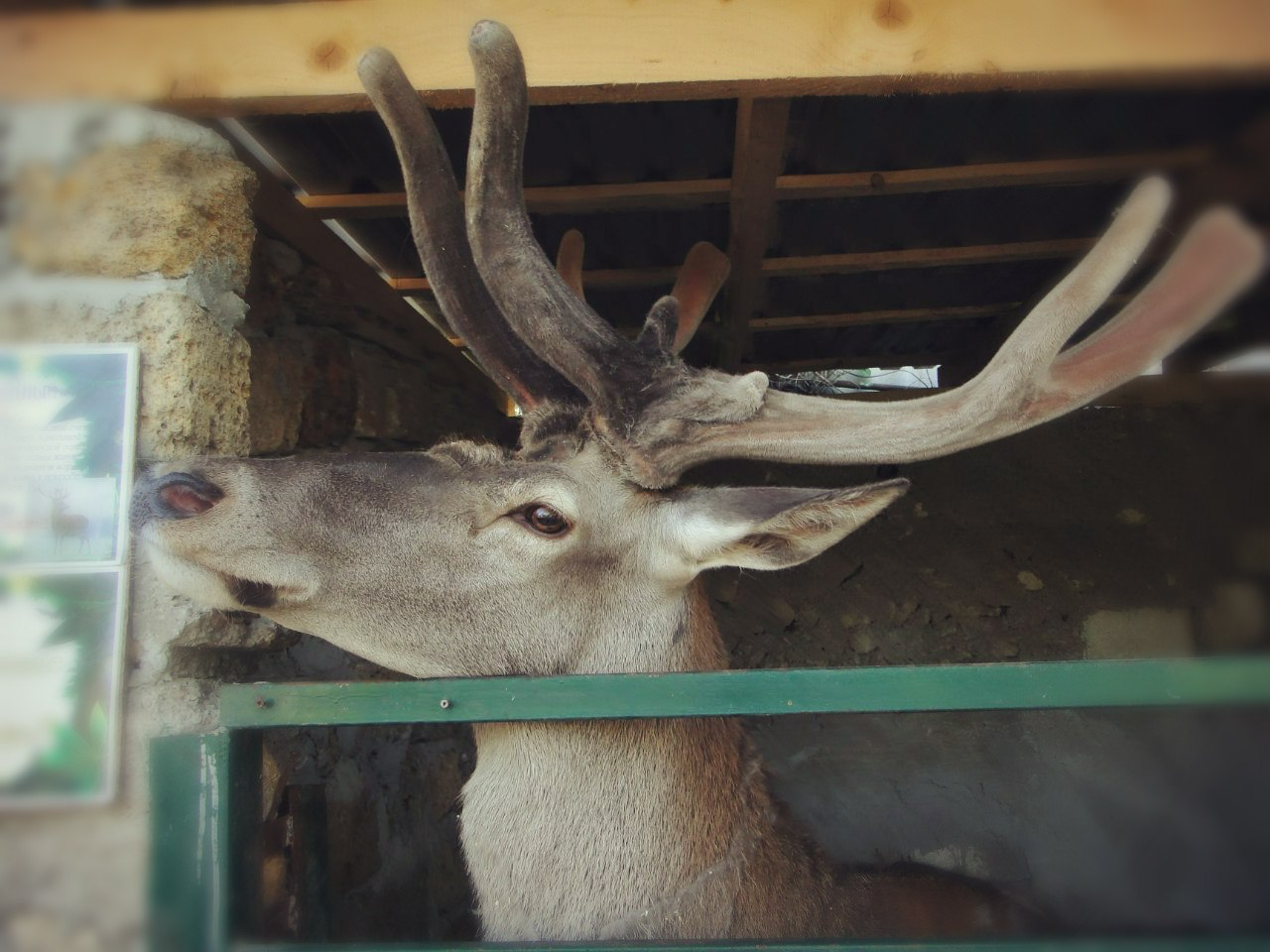
Red deer

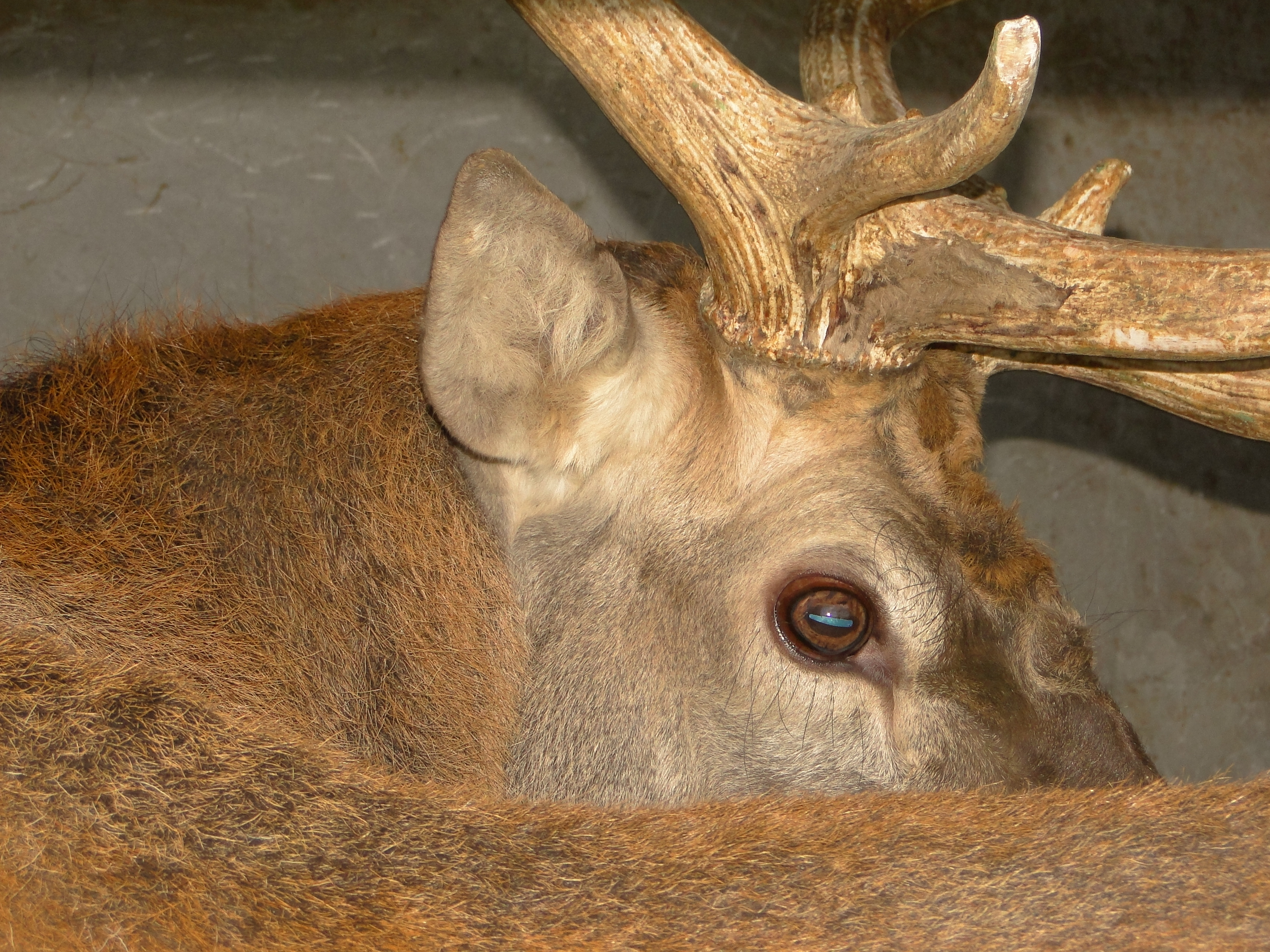
Red deer, Lyolik

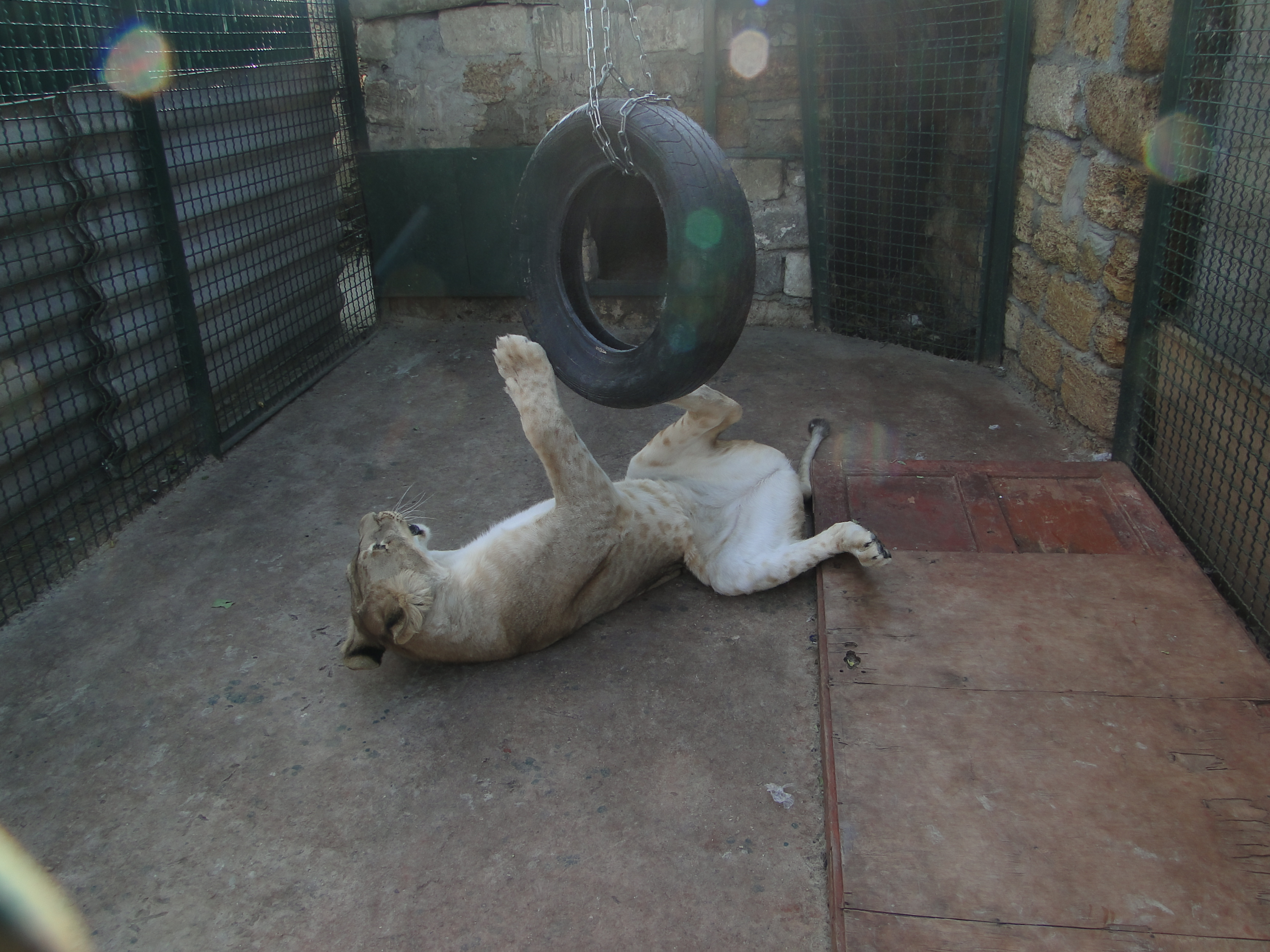
Lioness, Marquise

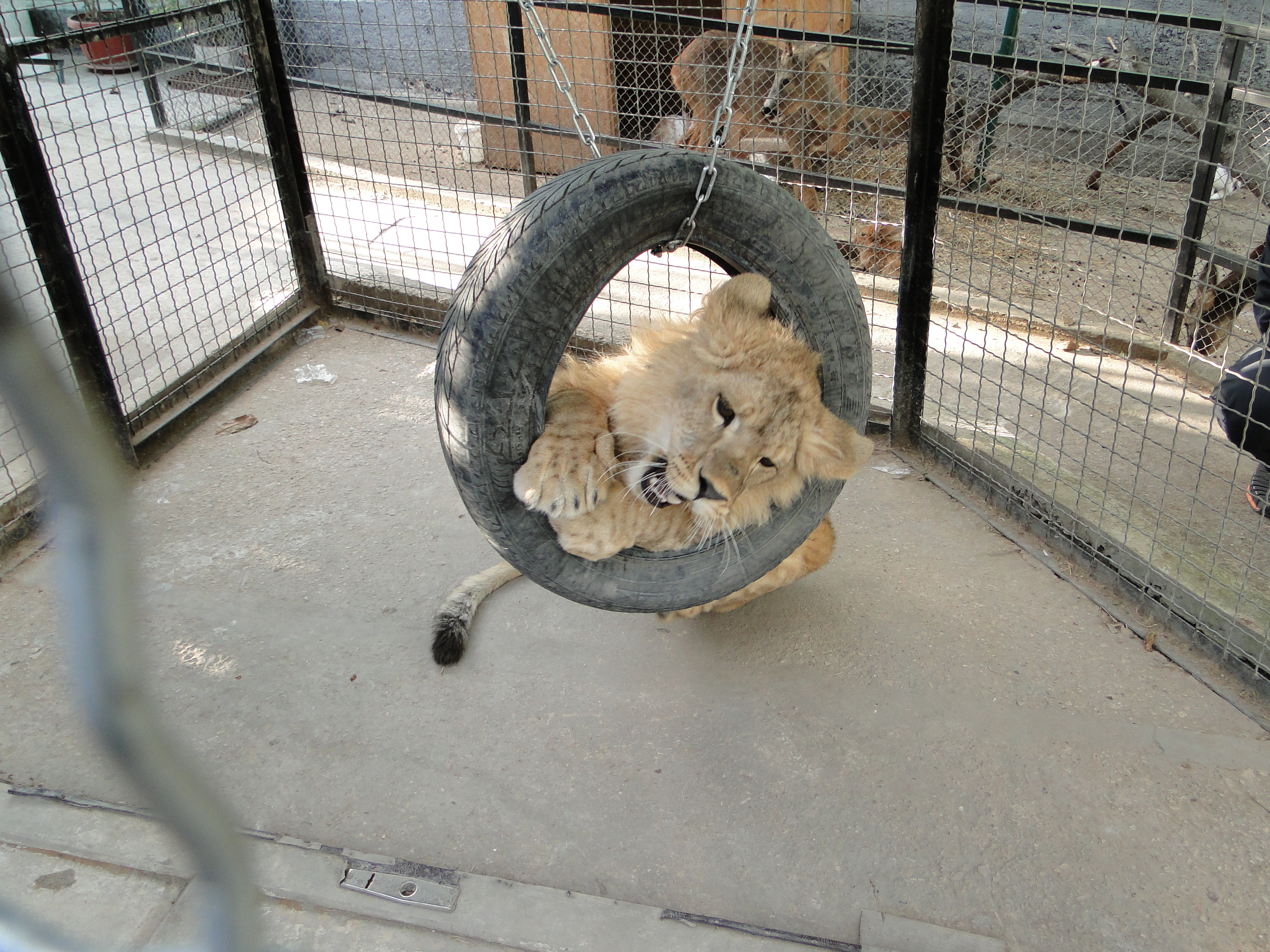
Nicholas the younger lion

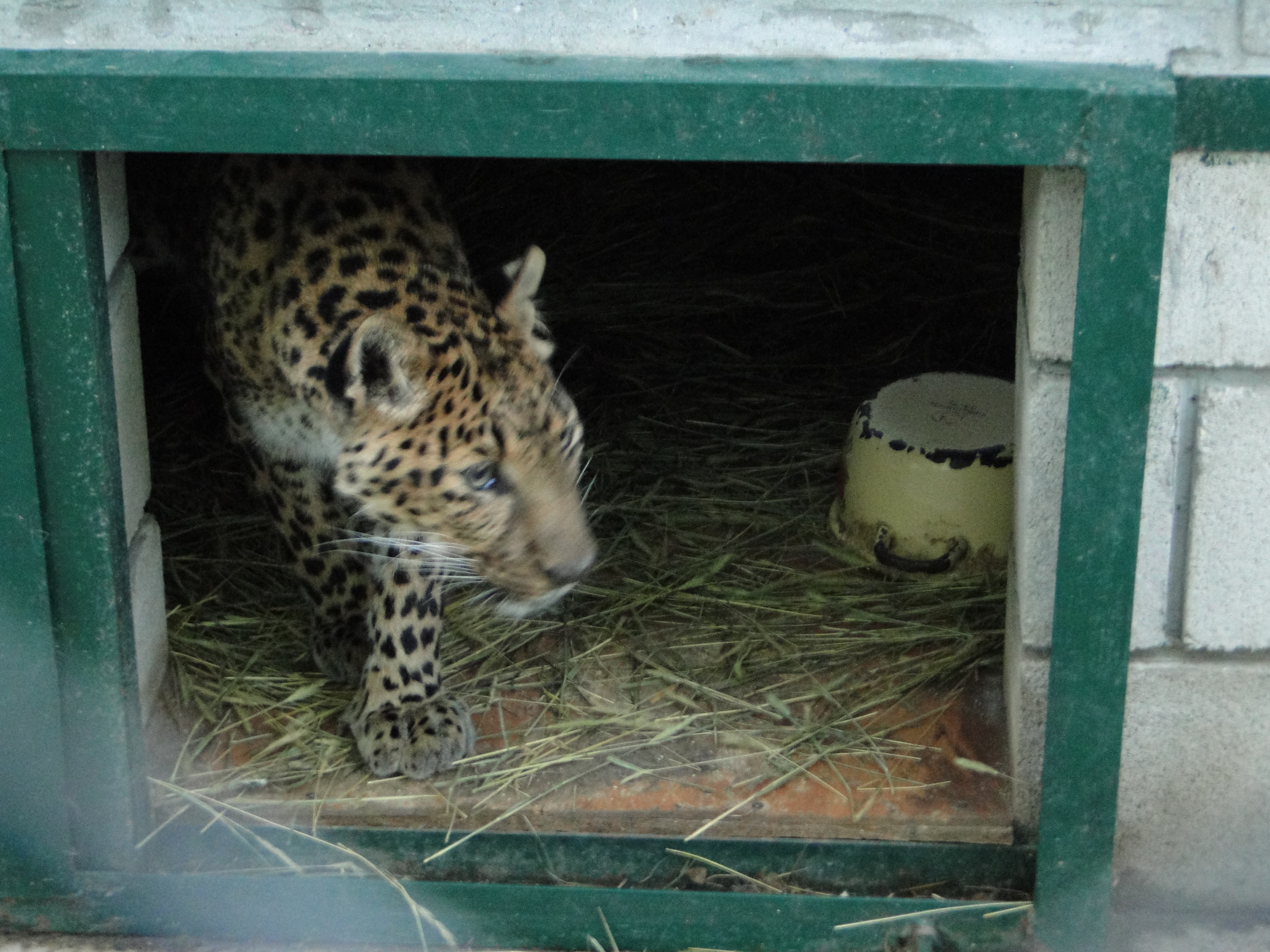
Leopard, Hera

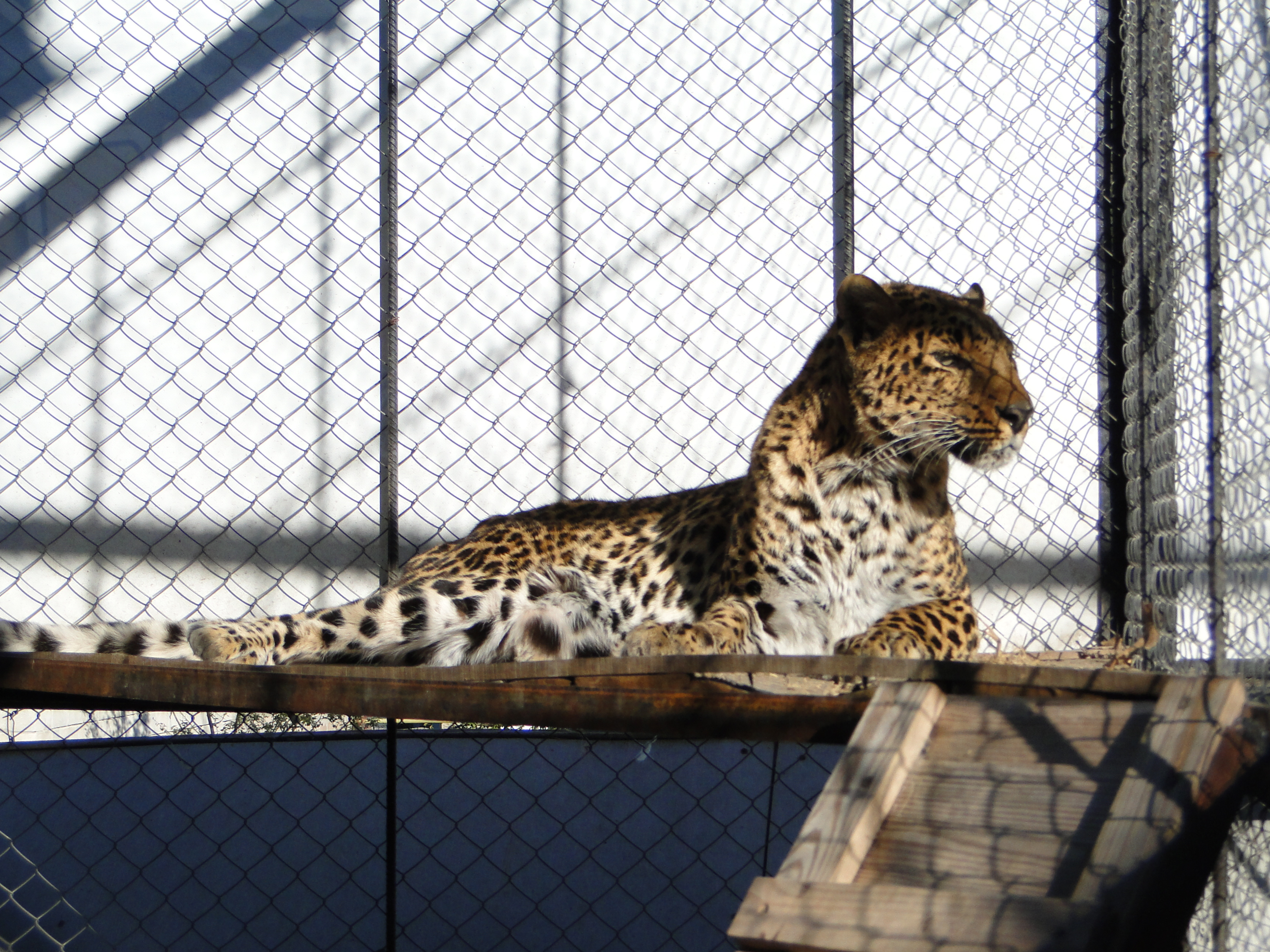
Hera takes a sunbath

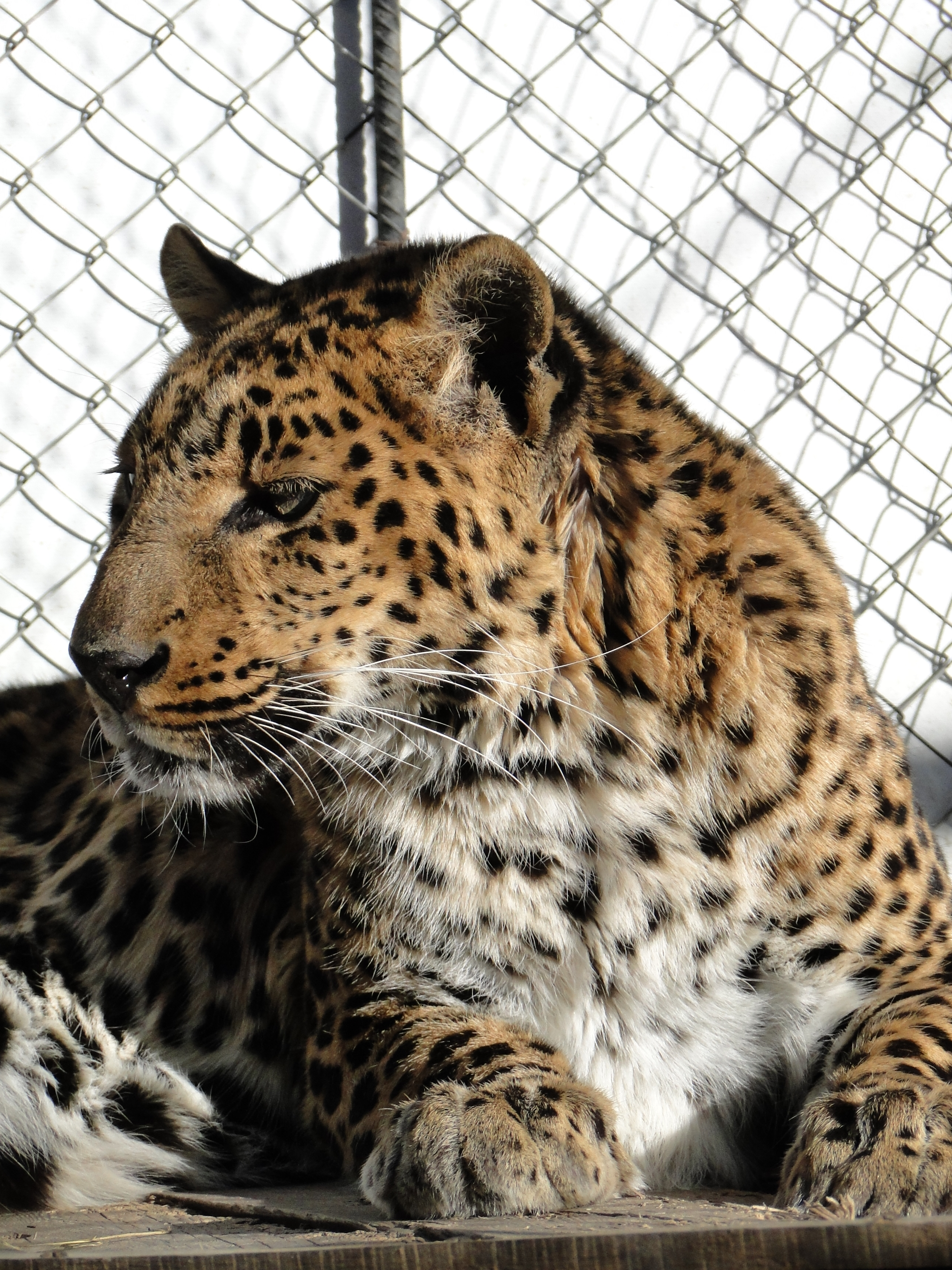
Hera

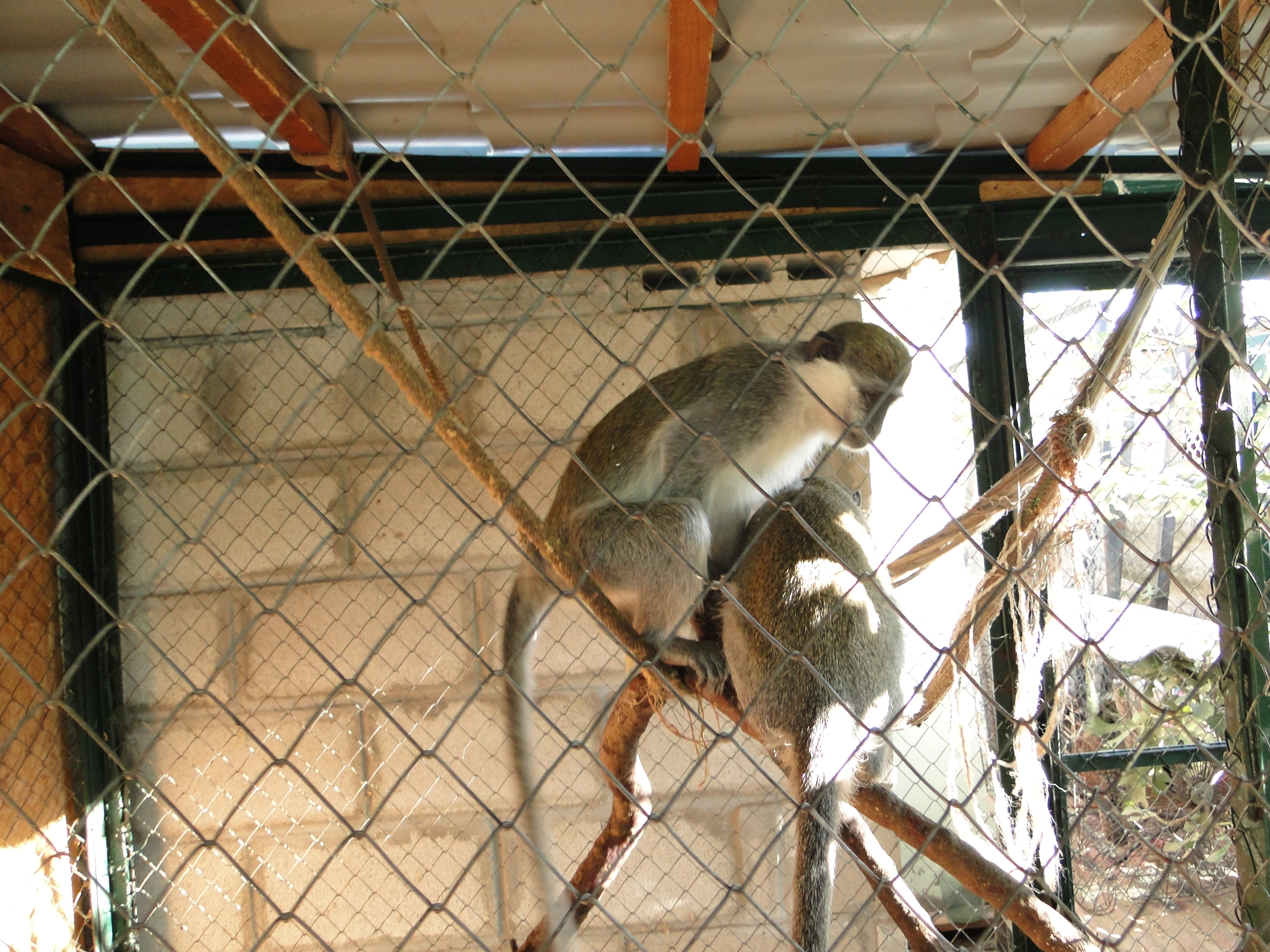
Vervet monkeys

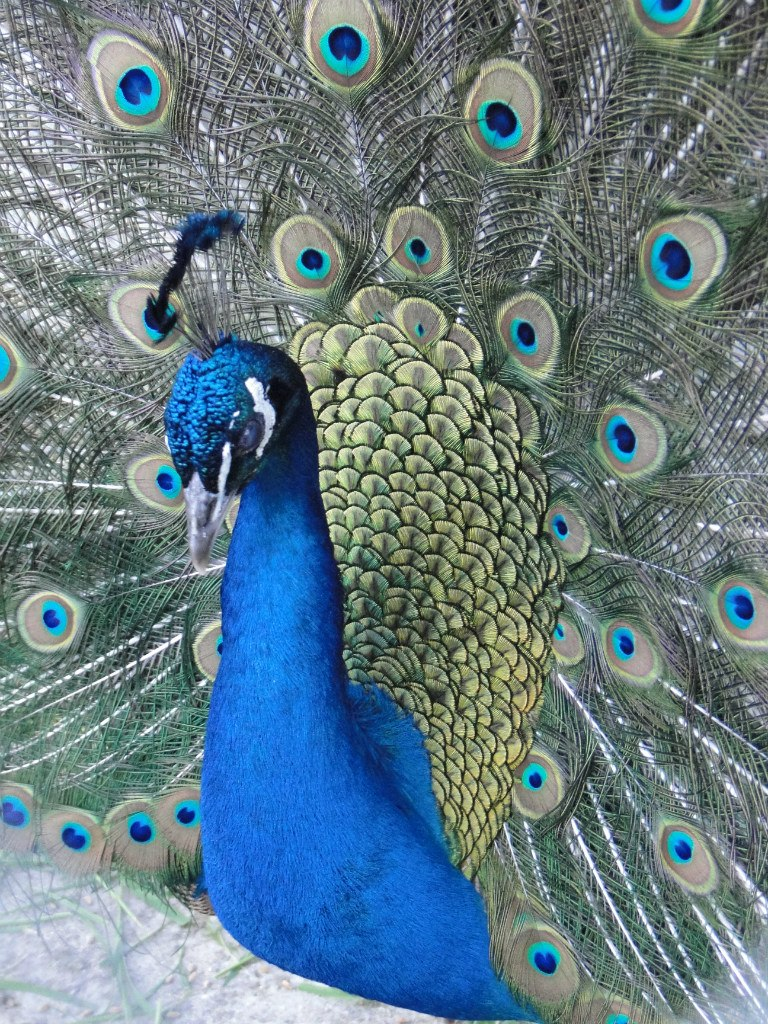
Indian peacock

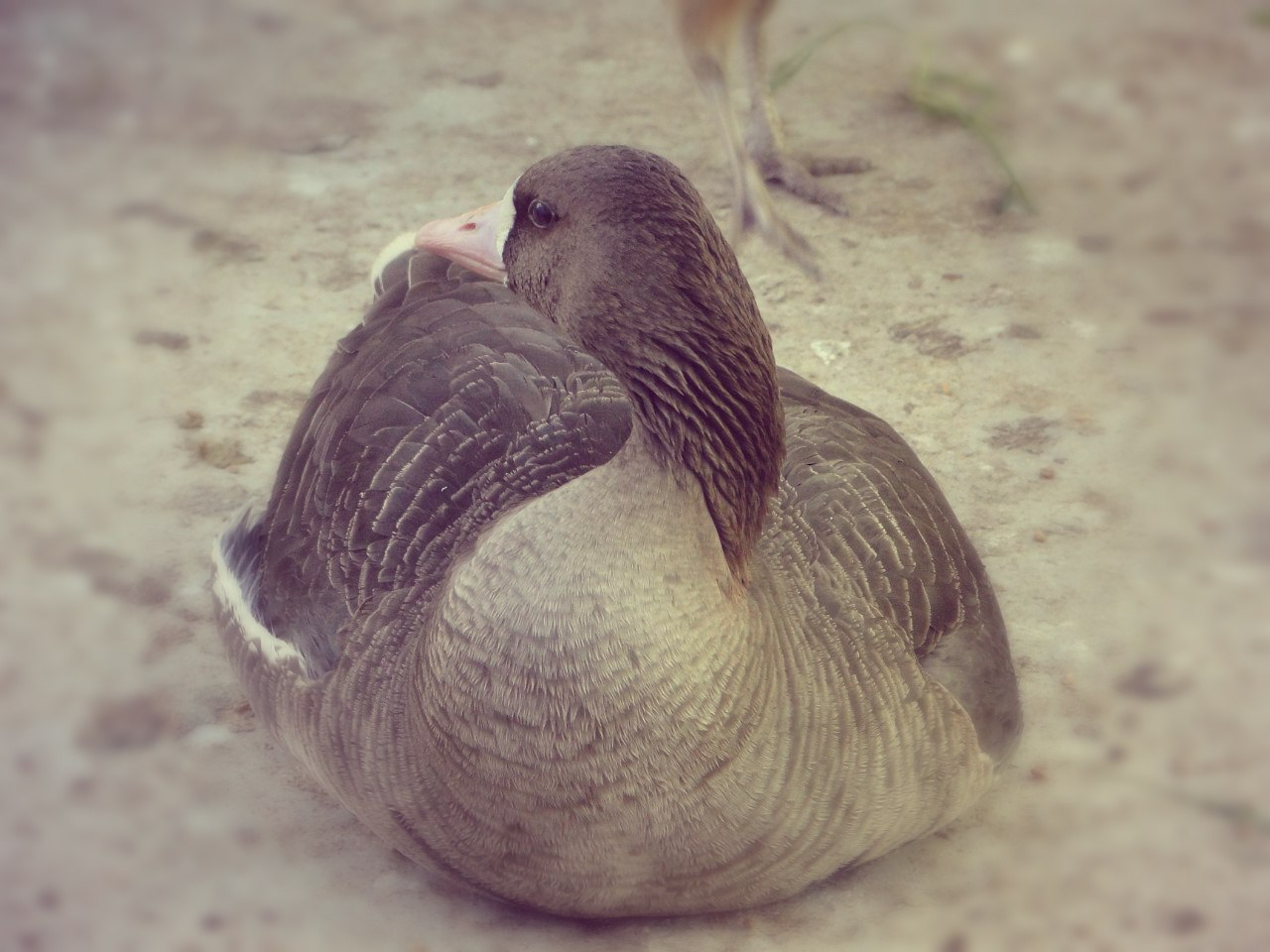
White-fronted goose

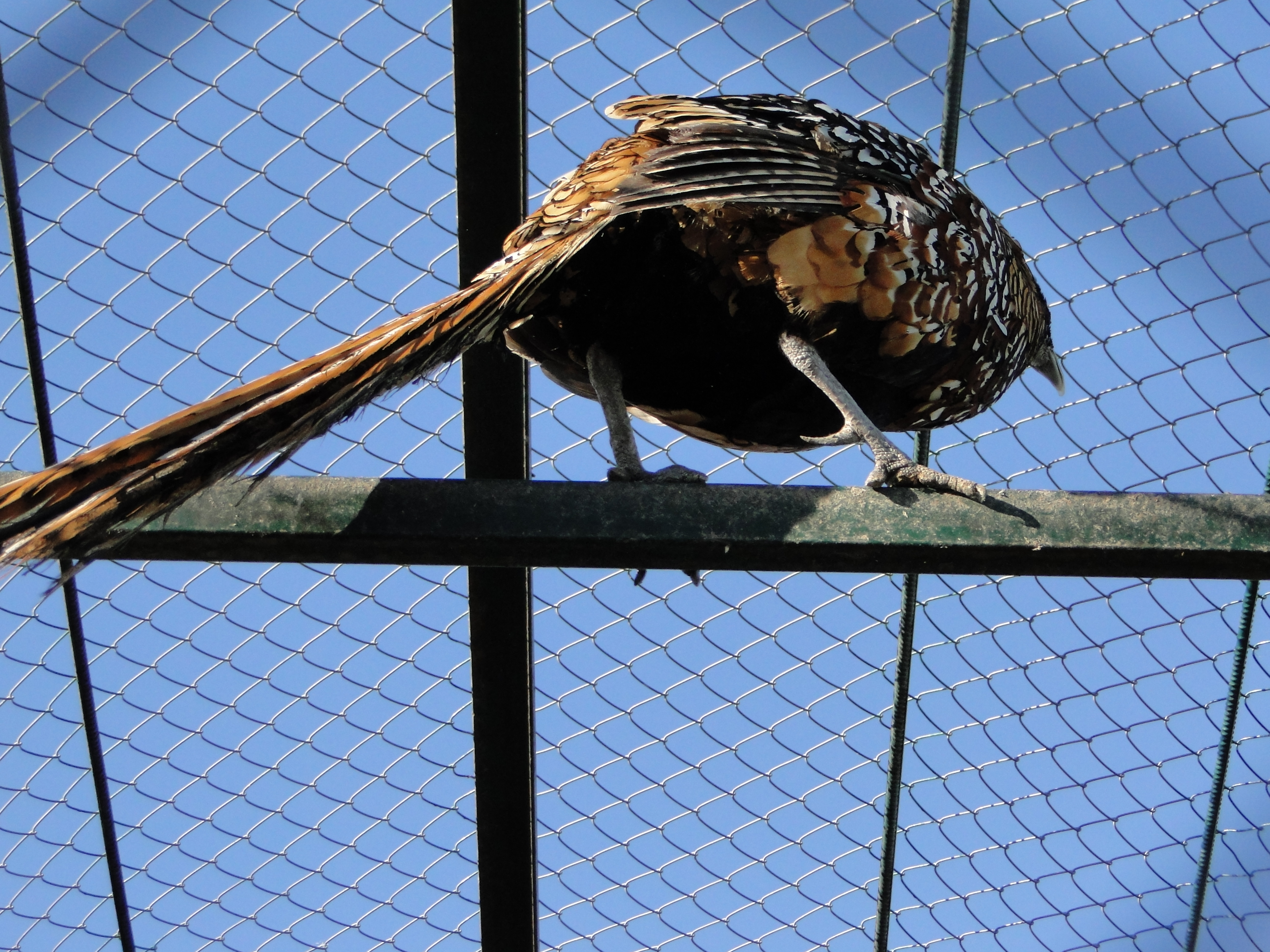
Royal pheasant

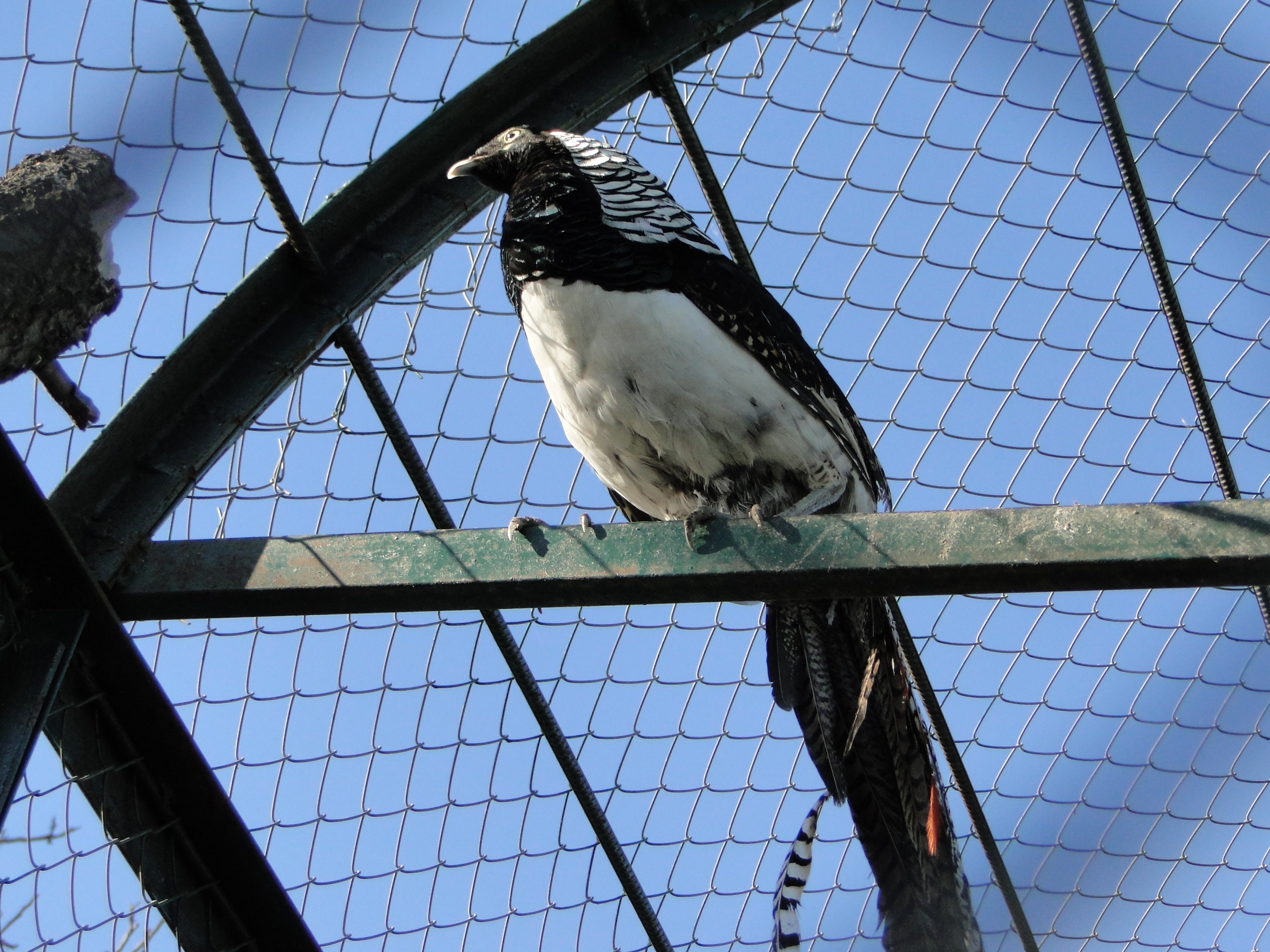
Common pheasant

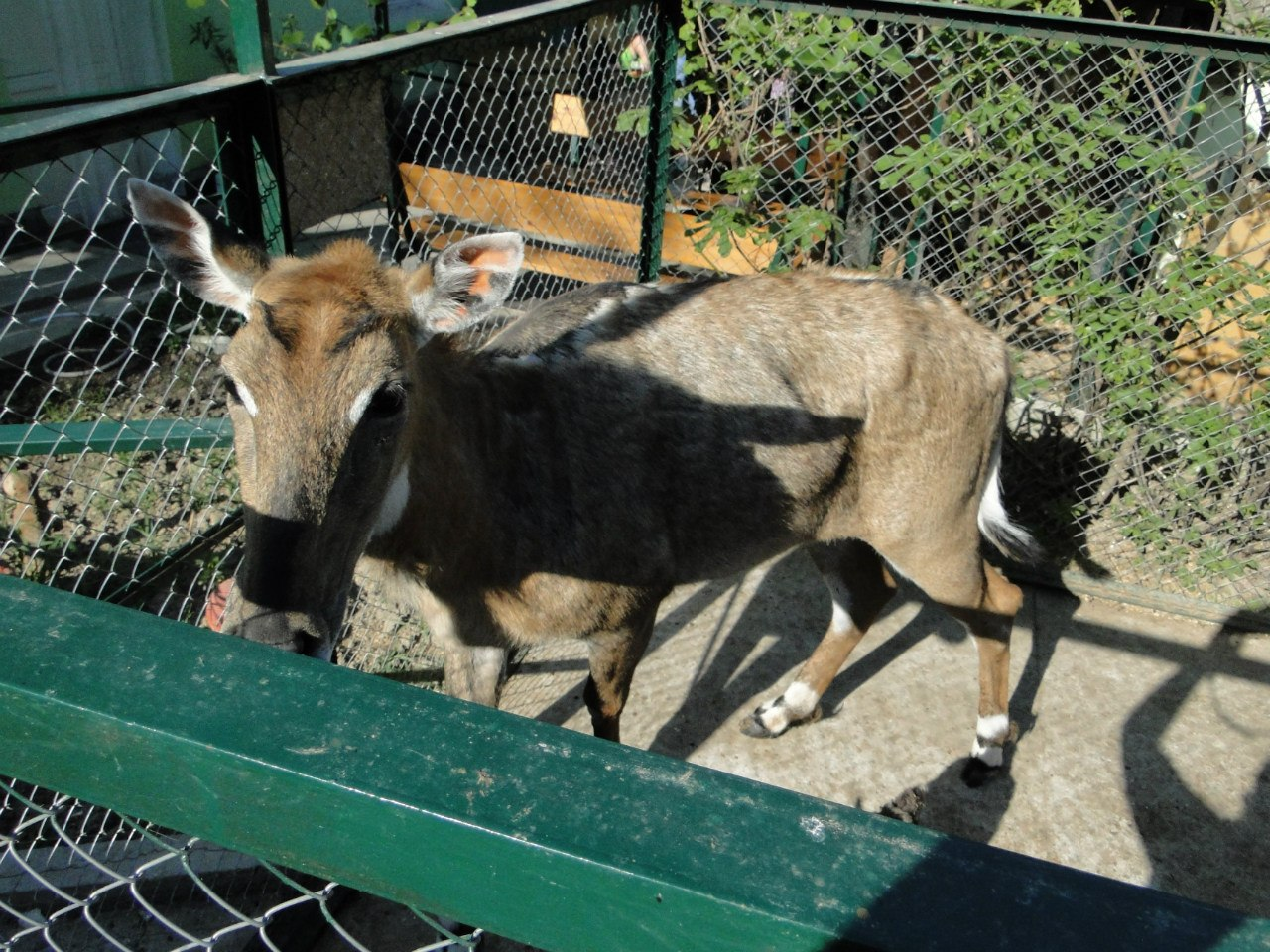
Miriam the nilgai
