= Soviet Heavy Draft =

Draught horse breed of the former Soviet Union

Soviet Heavy Draft Советский тяжеловоз
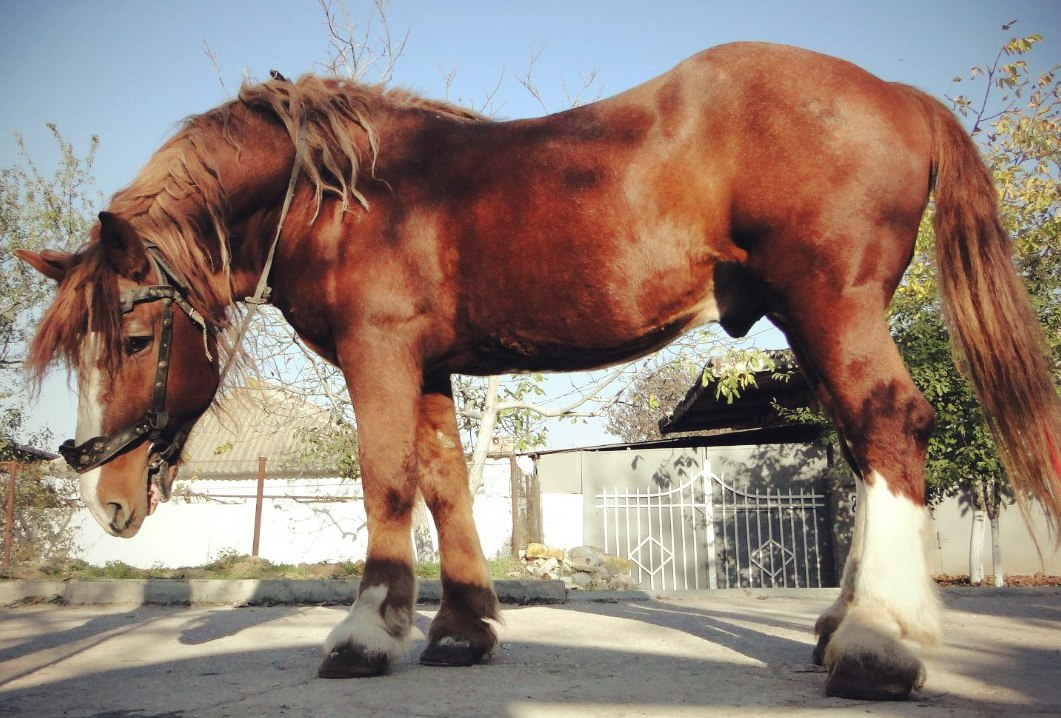
- Conservation status: FAO (2007): not listed
- Other names: Russian: Советский тяжеловоз; Sovetskii Tyazhelovoz; Sovetskaya Tyazhelovozskaya; Soviet Heavy Draught
- Country of origin: Former Soviet Union; Russian Federation
- Use: Working animal

Traits
- Weight: Male: average 850 kg maximum 1,000 kg; Female: 700 kg
- Height: Male: 163 cm; Female: 160 cm
- Colour: bay, brown, chestnut

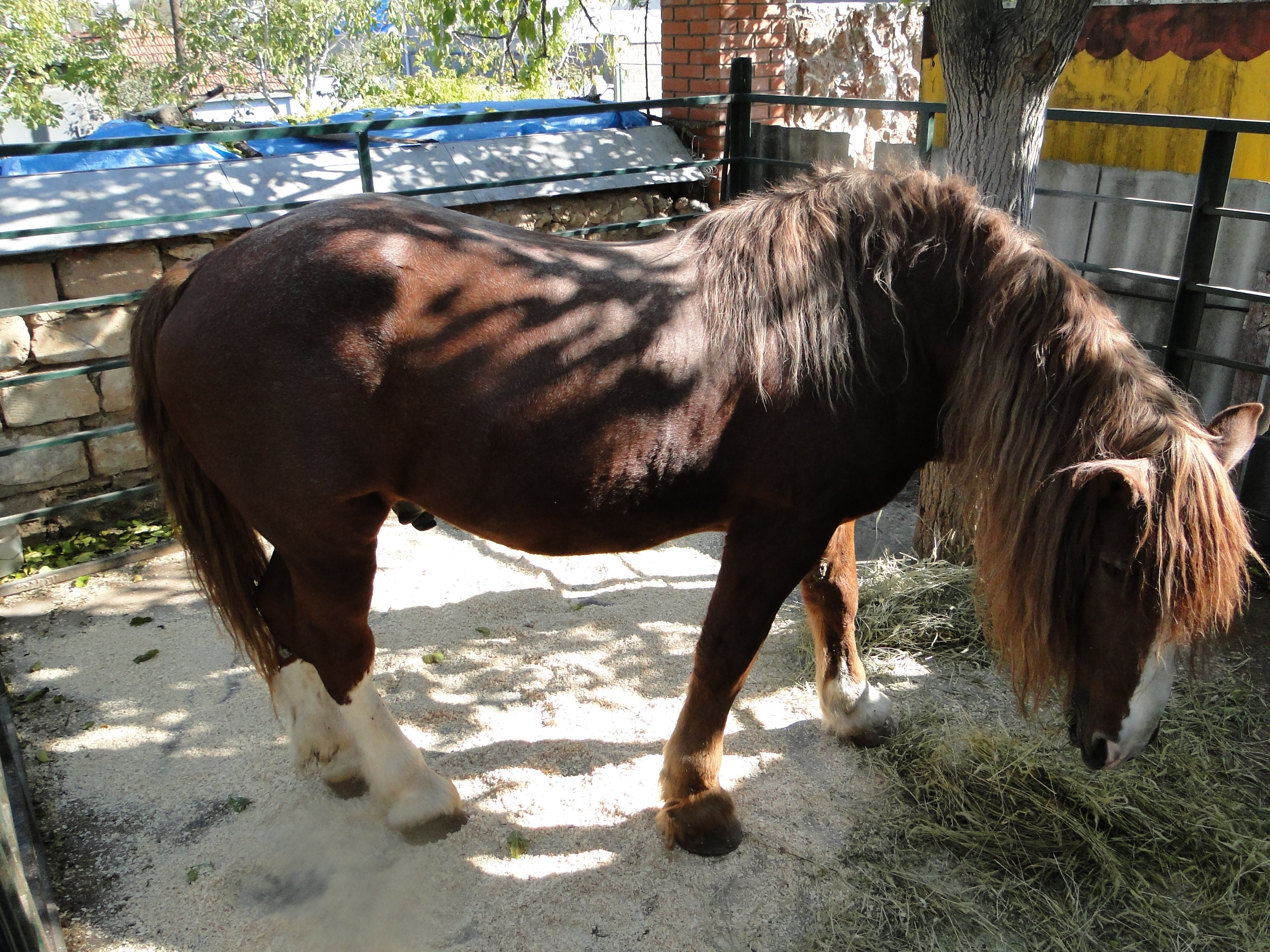
In the Sevastopol Zoo (May 2011)

The Soviet Heavy Draft is a Russian breed of heavy draft horse. It derives from the Belgian Brabant heavy draft breed. It was developed in the former Soviet Union for agricultural draft work, and was recognized as a breed in 1952. It is one of several heavy draft breeds developed in the Soviet Union in the twentieth century, others being the Russian Heavy Draft – which derived mainly from the Ardennais – and the Vladimir Heavy Draft, which was derived principally from the Clydesdale.

== History ==
The Russian Empire had no indigenous breeds of heavy draft horse. The origins of the Soviet Heavy Draft date to the late nineteenth century, at the Khrenovski stud farm in Voronezh Oblast. Imported Brabant draft stallions from Belgium were cross-bred with mares of various types: some were of Ardennais, Jutland, Percheron or Suffolk Punch draft type, others were riding horses. Breeding was later transferred to the Pochinki Stud Farm in Pochinki, in Nizhny Novgorod Oblast, with another center at the stud farm of Gavrilov Posad, in Ivanovo Oblast, and another in Mordovia.

The breeding range covered a broad area in central-southern Russia. In 1885 there were three Brabant stallions in that area; in 1895 there were fifty-eight, by 1950 almost four hundred, and nearly nine hundred in 1945. There was strong demand for powerful agricultural horses, and the area of influence of the Brabant stallions spread. They were used in the creation of the Estonian and Lithuanian Heavy Draft breeds.

The Soviet Heavy Draft was named and officially recognized in 1952. In 1980 the total population was about 35,000, of which almost 4,000 were pure-bred.

== Characteristics ==
The selective breeding that created the Soviet Heavy Draft resulted in a massively-built horse with free-moving gaits.

It has a straight or convex profile, and a short neck. The torso is wide and muscular, with a wide strong back and a muscular sloping croup. The abdomen is rounded. The legs are short and sturdy with solid joints and broad rounded hooves.

== Use ==
The Soviet Heavy Draft was created for draft work in agriculture and industry. It is also used in the production of meat and milk. Mares are moderately fertile (65–75%), and foals are fast-growing, reaching 350–400 kg when weaned. The highest recorded milk yield per lactation is 6,320 kg.

It was among the breeds used in the development of the Bulgarian Heavy Draft in the later twentieth century.

== Sources ==
- Книга о лошади / сост. С. М. Буденный. том 1. М., 1952.
- Советская тяжеловозная порода // Большая Советская Энциклопедия. / редколл., гл. ред. Б. А. Введенский. 2-е изд. том 39. М., Государственное научное издательство «Большая Советская энциклопедия», 1956. стр.484
