= Tabun =

Tabun may refer to:

- Tabun (nerve agent), the first nerve-agent chemical weapon to be discovered
- "Tabun" (song), a 2020 single by Japanese music duo Yoasobi
- Tabun Cave, part of a World Heritage Site related to human evolution at Mount Carmel in Israel
- Basmat Tab'un, a town in Israel
- Tabun oven, a clay oven used in the Middle East to make bread
- Tabun-Khara-Obo crater, a meteor impact crater in Mongolia
- Andres Tabun (born 1954), Estonian actor
- Tabun, a barangay of Angeles City in the Philippines
- Tabun, a barangay of Mabalacat in the Philippines
- Tabun (horse breeding), a group of horses
