= Russian Heavy Draft =

Russian breed of draught horse

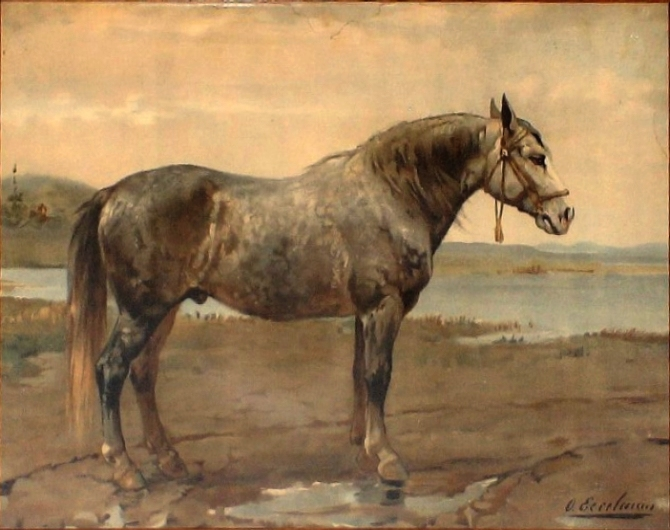
- Painting by Otto Eerelman of a Russian draft horse; Paardenrassen Kunstalbum, 1898
- Conservation status: FAO (2007): not at risk; DAD-IS (2025): unknown
- Other names: Russian: Русский тяжеловоз; Russkii Tyazhelovoz; Russkaya Tyazhelovoznaya; Russian Draft; Russian Ardennes
- Country of origin: Imperial Russia
- Distribution: Belarus; Russian Federation; Ukraine
- Use: draft; meat; milk

Traits
- Weight: 580–700 kg; Male: average: 650 kg; Female: average: 575 kg
- Height: 144–152 cm; Male: average: 152 cm; Female: average: 149 cm
- Colour: bay; chestnut; strawberry roan

The Russian Draft or Russian Heavy Draft (Russian: Русский тяжеловоз, Russkii Tyazhelovoz) is a Russian breed of draft horse. It was bred in Imperial Russia in the second half of the nineteenth century, and until after the Russian Revolution was known as the Russian Ardennes. It is one of a number of draft breeds developed there at approximately the same time, others being the Lithuanian Heavy Draft, the Soviet Heavy Draft and the Vladimir Heavy Draft; it is both the oldest and the smallest of them. The present name dates from the Soviet era, and was used from 1952.

== History ==
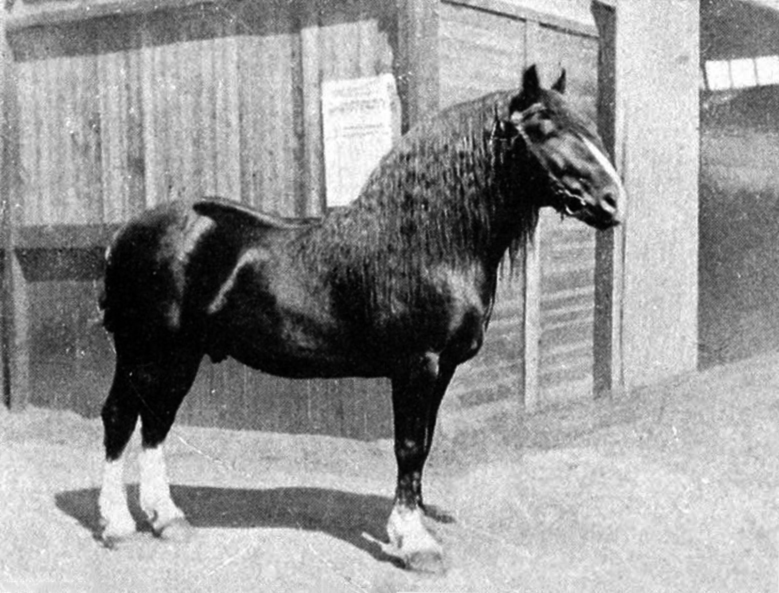
Russian Ardennes stallion at the Exposition Universelle, Paris, 1900

Selective breeding of what would become the Russian Ardennes began in the 1860s at the Petrovsky Agricultural and Forestry Academy in Moscow and at various stud farms including the Khrenov Stud in Voronezh Oblast, and the Derkul Stud in Ukraine. From about this time, stallions of the Franco-Belgian Ardennais heavy horse were imported to the Russian Empire from Sweden in increasing numbers; between 1875 and 1915, their number grew from nine to almost six hundred. These were put to local mares; some Brabançon, Percheron and Orlov Trotter blood was also introduced. The aim was to produce a compact draft animal suitable for farm work. The Russian Ardennes was presented at the Exposition Universelle in Paris in 1900.

As with other Russian horse breeds, the events of the First World War and the Russian Revolution caused a severe decline in numbers; in 1924, fewer than a hundred stallions remained. By 1937 the breed was re-established; the name was changed in 1952 to "Russkii Tyazhelovoz" or "Russian Heavy Draft". In the 1980s a population of almost fifty thousand was recorded, distributed in many parts of the Soviet Union – in Byelorussia, the North Caucasus, Udmurtia and Ukraine, in Western Siberia, and in the oblasts of Archangel, Kirov, Perm, Sverdlovsk and Vologda.

== Characteristics ==
The Russian Heavy Draft is a small powerful horse of heavy cob conformation, with lively gaits. The legs are short in comparison to the length of the body, and have little or no feathering; cannon-bone circumference is approximately 22 cm. Perhaps as a result of the Orlov Trotter influence, the head is not heavy. The horses are usually either chestnut or strawberry roan, but may also be bay. Among common defects are sickle hocks and weakness of the back.

The horses are fast-growing, fertile and long-lived. Stallions have a fertility rate in the range of 80%–85%, and may continue to stand at stud after the age of twenty. Foals weigh about 250 kg when weaned, and reach approximately 75% of full adult weight and 97% of full adult height in their first eighteen months of life.

== Use ==
The Russian Heavy Draft was originally bred for draft work in agriculture. In modern times, it is kept for its high milk yield. Mares may give approximately 2500 kg of milk in a normal lactation lasting six or seven months; the highest yield recorded for one lactation is 5540 kg. The milk is much used in the production of kumis. The Russian Heavy Draft is also raised for slaughter to supply meat. It has been used in cross-breeding in attempts to improve other breeds such as the Bashkir.
