= Suffolk Punch =

English breed of draught horse

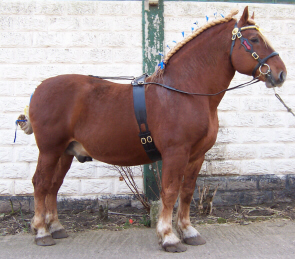

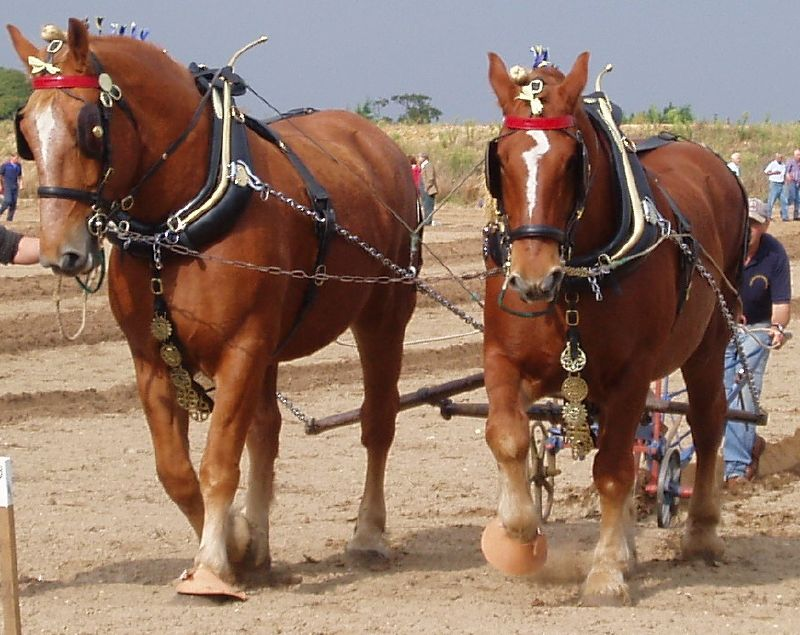
- Conservation status: Critical
- Other names: Suffolk
- Country of origin: England

Traits
- Distinguishing features: Heavy draught horse, always chestnut in colour

Breed standards
- Suffolk Horse Society (England); Suffolk Punch Trust; North American Suffolk Horse Association

The Suffolk Horse, also historically known as the Suffolk Punch or Suffolk Sorrel, is an English breed of draught horse. The first part of the name derives from the county of Suffolk in East Anglia, and the word "punch" is an old English word for a short stout person. It is a heavy draught horse which is always chestnut in colour. Suffolk Punches are known as good doers, and tend to have energetic gaits.

The breed was developed in the early 16th century, and remains similar in phenotype to its founding stock. The Suffolk Punch was developed for farm work, and gained popularity during the early 20th century. However, as agriculture became increasingly mechanised, the breed fell out of favour, particularly from the middle part of the century, and almost disappeared completely. The breed's status is listed as critical by the UK Rare Breeds Survival Trust and The Livestock Conservancy. The breed pulled artillery and non-motorised commercial vans and buses, as well as being used for farm work. It was also exported to other countries to upgrade local equine stock. Today, they are used for draught work, logging and advertising.

== Characteristics ==
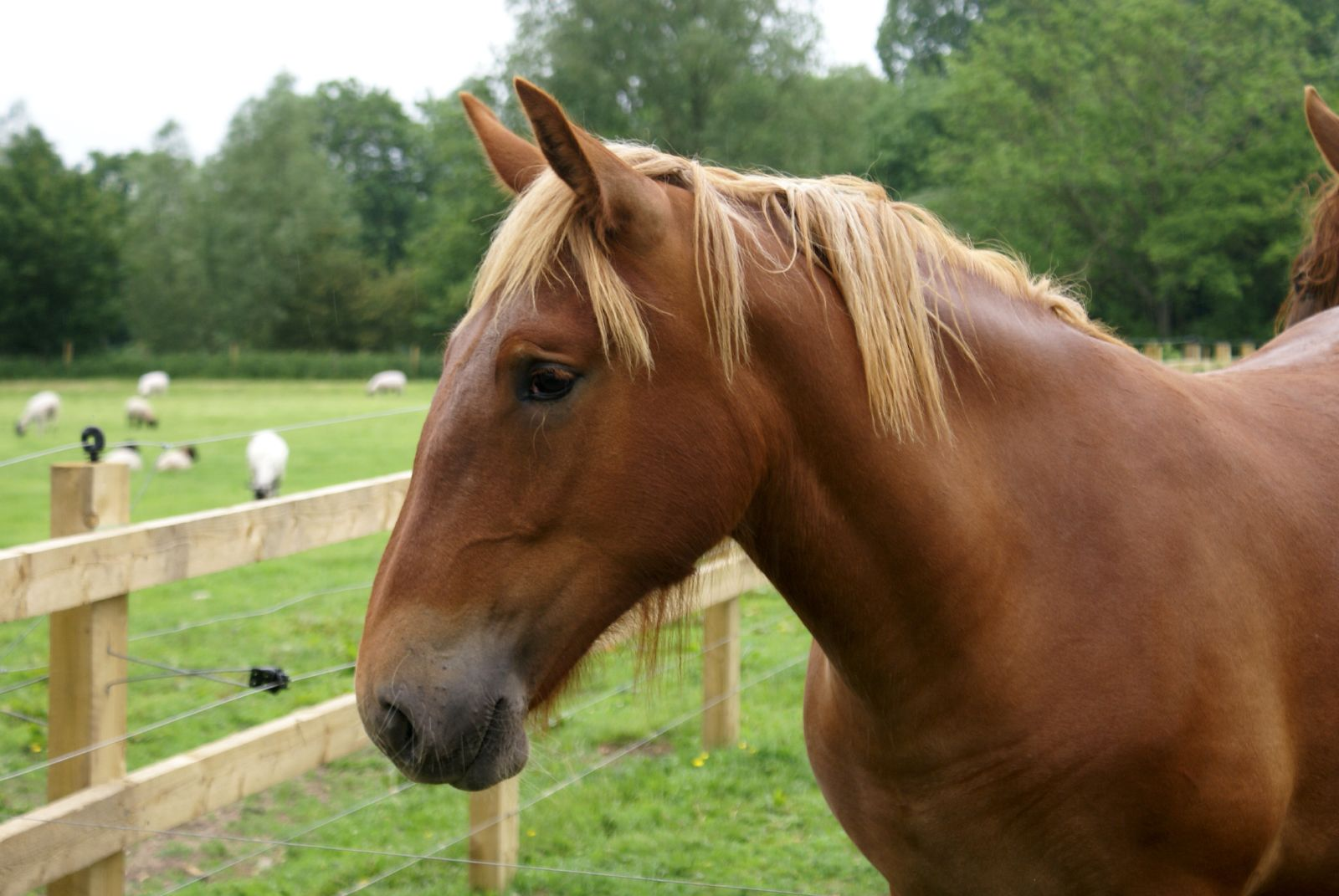
Suffolk Punch head

Suffolk Punches generally stand 165 to 178 centimetres (16.1 to 17.2 h), weigh 900 to 1000 kilograms (2000 to 2200 lb), and are always chestnut in colour. The traditional spelling, still used by the Suffolk Horse Society, is "chesnut" (with no "t" in the middle of the word). Horses of the breed come in many different shades of chestnut, ranging from dark to red to light. Suffolk horse breeders in the UK use several different colour terms specific to the breed, including dark liver, dull dark, red, and bright. White markings are rare and generally limited to small areas on the face and lower legs. Equestrian author Marguerite Henry described the breed by saying, "His color is bright chestnut – like a tongue of fire against black field furrows, against green corn blades, against yellow wheat, against blue horizons. Never is he any other color."

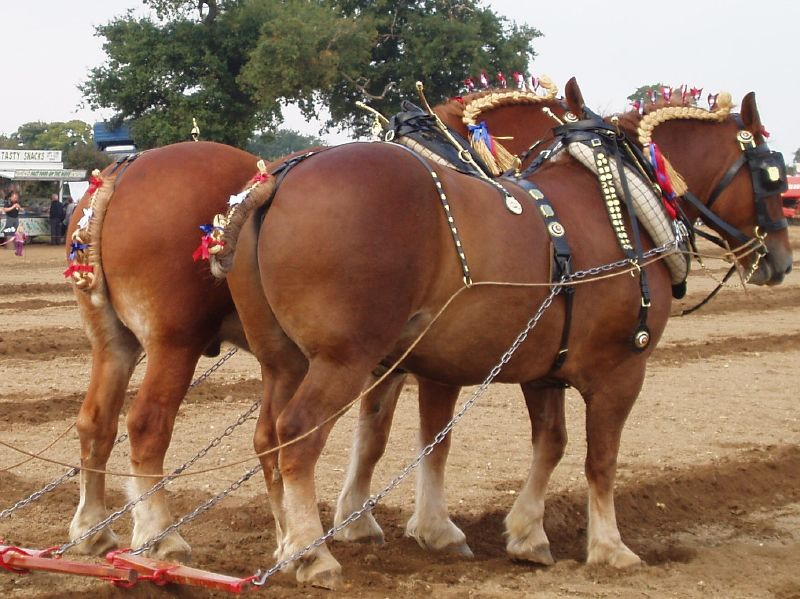
Body shape of the Suffolk Punch

The Suffolk Punch tends to be shorter but more massively built than other British heavy draught breeds, such as the Clydesdale or the Shire, as a result of having been developed for agricultural work rather than road haulage. The breed has a powerful, arching neck; well-muscled, sloping shoulders; a short, wide back; and a muscular, broad croup. Legs are short and strong, with broad joints; sound, well-formed hooves; and little or no feathering on the fetlocks. The movement of the Suffolk Punch is said to be energetic, especially at the trot. The breed tends to mature early and be long-lived, and is economical to keep, needing less feed than other horses of similar type and size. They are hard workers, said to be willing to "pull a heavily laden wagon till [they] dropped."

In the past, the Suffolk was criticised for its poor feet, having hooves that were too small for its body mass. This was corrected by the introduction of classes at major shows in which hoof conformation and structure were judged. This practice, unique among horse breeds, resulted in such an improvement that the Suffolk Punch is now considered to have excellent foot conformation.

== History ==
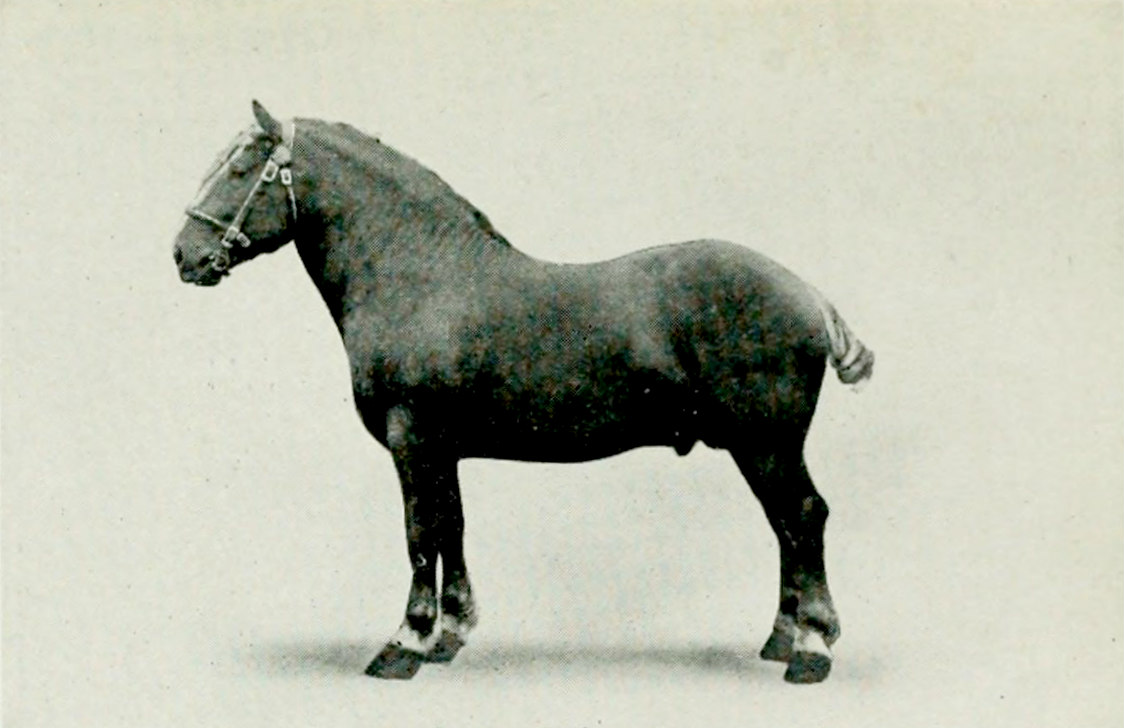
Suffolk stallion 1911

The Suffolk Punch registry is the oldest English breed society. The first known mention of the Suffolk Punch is in William Camden's Britannia, published in 1586, in which he describes a working horse of the eastern counties of England that is easily recognisable as the Suffolk Punch. This description makes them the oldest breed of horse that is recognisable in the same form today. A detailed genetic study shows that the Suffolk Punch is closely genetically grouped not only with the Fell and Dales British ponies, but also with the European Haflinger. They were developed in Norfolk and Suffolk in the east of England, a relatively isolated area. The local farmers developed the Suffolk Punch for farm work, for which they needed a horse with power, stamina, health, longevity, and docility, and they bred the Suffolk to comply with these needs. Because the farmers used these horses on their land, they seldom had any to sell, which helped to keep the bloodlines pure and unchanged.

The foundation sire of the modern Suffolk Punch breed was a 157 centimetres (15.2 h) stallion foaled near Woodbridge in 1768 and owned by Thomas Crisp of Ufford. At this time, the breed was known as the Suffolk Sorrel. This horse was never named, and is simply known as "Crisp's horse". Although it is commonly (and mistakenly) thought that this was the first horse of the breed, by the 1760s, all other male lines of the breed had died out, resulting in a genetic bottleneck. Another bottleneck occurred in the late 18th century.

In his History and Antiquities of Hawsted, in the County of Suffolk of 1784, Sir John Cullum describes the Suffolk Punch as "... generally about 15 hands high, of a remarkably short and compact make; their legs bony; and their shoulders loaded with flesh. Their colour is often of a light sorrel". During its development, the breed was influenced by the Norfolk Trotter, Norfolk Cob, and later the Thoroughbred. The uniform colouring derives in part from a small trotting stallion named Blakes Farmer, foaled in 1760. Other breeds were crossbred in an attempt to increase the size and stature of the Suffolk Punch, as well as to improve the shoulders, but they had little lasting influence, and the breed remains much as it was before any crossbreeding took place. The Suffolk Horse Society, formed in Britain in 1877 to promote the Suffolk Punch, published its first stud book in 1880. The first official exports of Suffolks to Canada took place in 1865. In 1880, the first Suffolks were imported into the United States, with more following in 1888 and 1903 to begin the breeding of Suffolk Punches in the US. The American Suffolk Horse Association was established and published its first stud book in 1907. By 1908, the Suffolk had also been exported from England to Spain, France, Germany, Austria, Russia, Sweden, various parts of Africa, New Zealand, Australia, Argentina and other countries.

By the time of the First World War, the Suffolk Punch had become a popular workhorse on large farms in East Anglia due to its good temperament and excellent work ethic. It remained popular until the Second World War, when a combination of the need for increased wartime food production (which resulted in many horses being sent to the slaughterhouse), and increased farm mechanisation which followed the war-decimated population numbers. Only nine foals were registered with the Suffolk Horse Society in 1966, but a revival of interest in the breed has occurred since the late 1960s, and numbers have risen continuously. The breed did remain rare, and in 1998, only 80 breeding mares were in Britain, producing around 40 foals per year. In the United States, the American Suffolk Horse Association became inactive after the war and remained so for 15 years, but restarted in May 1961 as the draught-horse market began to recover. In the 1970s and early 1980s, the American registry allowed some Belgians to be bred to Suffolk Punches, but only the fillies from these crosses were permitted registry with the American Suffolk Horse Association.

As of 2001, horses bred with American bloodlines were not allowed to be registered with the British Association, and the breed was considered the rarest horse breed in the United Kingdom. Although the Suffolk Punch population has continued to increase, the Rare Breeds Survival Trust of the UK considers their survival status critical, in 2011, between 800 and 1,200 horses were in the United States and around 150 were in England. The Livestock Conservancy also lists the breed as critical. The Suffolk Horse Society recorded the births of 36 purebred foals in 2007, and a further 33 foals as of March 2008. By 2016, about 300 Suffolk Punches were in the UK with 30 to 40 purebred foals being born annually.

== Uses ==
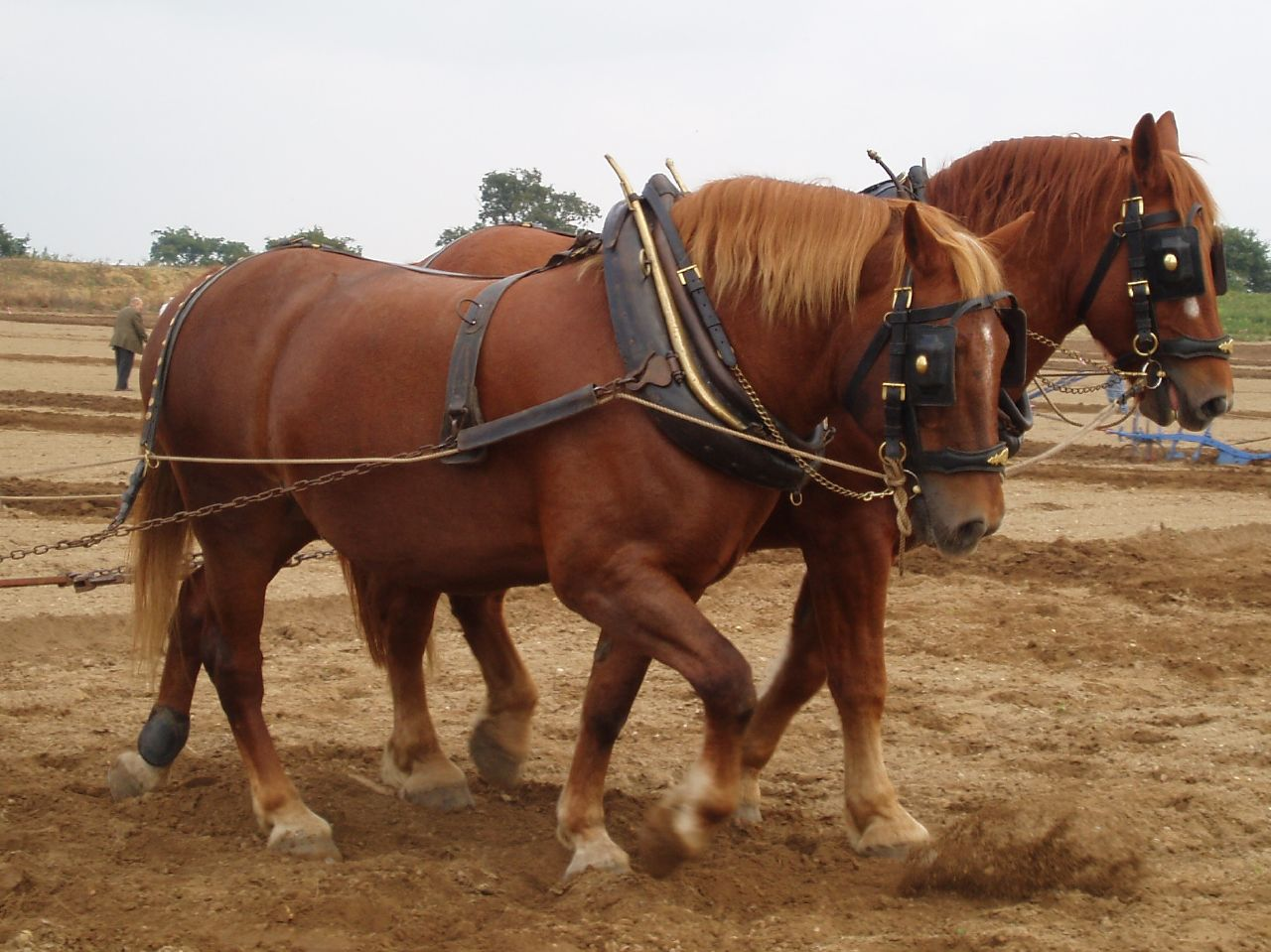
Suffolk Punch horses ploughing

The Suffolk Punch was used mainly for draught work on farms but was also often used to pull heavy artillery in wartime. Like other heavy horses, they were also used to pull non-motorised vans and other commercial vehicles. Today, they are used for commercial forestry operations, for other draught work, and in advertising. They are also used for crossbreeding, to produce heavy sport horses for use in hunter and show jumping competition. As a symbol of the county in which they are based, Ipswich Town F.C. incorporate a Suffolk Punch as a dominant part of their team crest.

== Breed influence ==
The Suffolk Punch contributed significantly to the creation of the Jutland breed in Denmark. Oppenheimer LXII, a Suffolk Punch imported to Denmark in the 1860s by noted Suffolk dealer Oppenheimer of Hamburg, was one of the founding stallions of the Jutland. Oppenheimer specialised in selling Suffolk Punches, importing them to the Mecklenburg Stud in Germany. The stallion Oppenheimer founded the Jutland breed's most important bloodline, through his descendant Oldrup Munkedal. Suffolks were also exported to Pakistan in the 20th century, to be used in upgrading native breeds, and they have been crossed with Pakistani horses and donkeys to create army remounts and mules. Suffolks have adapted well to the Pakistani climate, despite their large size, and the programme has been successful. The Vladimir Heavy Draft, a draught breed from the former USSR, is another which has been influenced by the Suffolk.
