= Remigijus =

Remigijus is a masculine Lithuanian given name. Notable people with the name include:

- Remigijus Kančys (born 1987), Lithuanian marathon runner
- Remigijus Kriukas (born 1961), Lithuanian painter
- Remigijus Lupeikis (born 1964), Lithuanian cyclist
- Remigijus Morkevičius (1982–2016), Lithuanian mixed martial artist and kickboxer
- Remigijus Pocius (born 1968), Lithuanian footballer
- Remigijus Šimašius (born 1974), Lithuanian jurist
- Remigijus Valiulis (born 1958), Lithuanian sprinter
- Remigijus Vilkaitis (born 1950), Lithuanian actor
- Remigijus Žemaitaitis (born 1982), Lithuanian politician
