= Vladimir Heavy Draft =

Russian breed of draught horse

Vladimir Heavy Draft Владимирский тяжеловоз
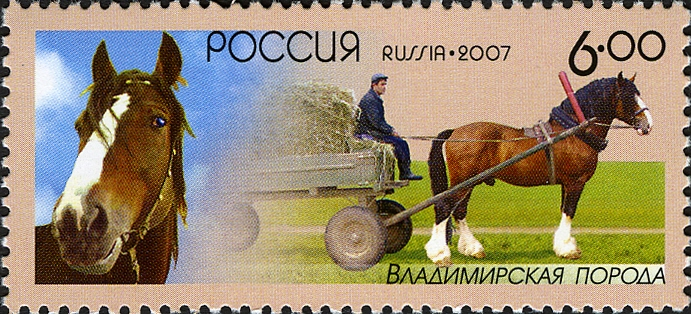
- On a Russian stamp
- Conservation status: FAO (2007): not at risk
- Other names: Russian: Владимирский тяжеловоз; Vladimirskiy Tyazhelovoz; Ivanovo; Russian Clydesdale; Vladimir Clydesdale
- Country of origin: USSR
- Use: draught, meat

Traits
- Weight: Male: 750–800 kg
- Height: Male: 160 cm; Female: 157 cm

The Vladimir Heavy Draft is a Russian breed of heavy draught horse. It was bred in the early twentieth century in farms and collectives in Ivanovo Oblast and Vladimir Oblast, to the east of Moscow. The most important influence on the development of the breed was from three Clydesdale stallions foaled between 1910 and 1923. The Vladimir was officially recognised in 1946.

== History ==
The Russian Empire had no indigenous breeds of heavy draught horse. The Vladimir was created at about the same time as the development of the Russian Heavy Draught in Ukraine.

The foundations of the Vladimir breed were laid between 1886 and 1924. Initial breeding began at the stud farm of Gavrilov Posad, in Ivanovo Oblast, where local horses were cross-bred with imported Clydesdale stock, with some limited influence from Cleveland Bay, Percheron and Suffolk Punch. Some use was made of Shire mares between 1919 and 1929. The three foundation stallions of the breed were all Clydesdales. Two of these – Border Brand and Lord James – were foaled in 1910, while Glen Albin was born in 1923.

The amount of cross-breeding was progressively reduced during the 1920s, and over the next twenty years the character and type of the breed were fixed. Official recognition came in 1946.

== Characteristics ==
The Vladimir is a draught horse of medium power, with energetic and active gaits. It is more solidly built than the Clydesdale, and unusually deep in the girth – thoracic circumference may reach 2.07 m. It is usually clean-legged, though feathering can occur. Bay is the most usual colour, with white markings to the face and legs.

== Use ==
The Vladimir was bred for agricultural draught work. It may be reared for meat. It is fast-growing: at six months, foals may reach a weight of 200 kg. Because of its lively trot movement, it is found suitable for pulling the three-horse troika of the region.
