= Žemaitukas =

Breed of horse

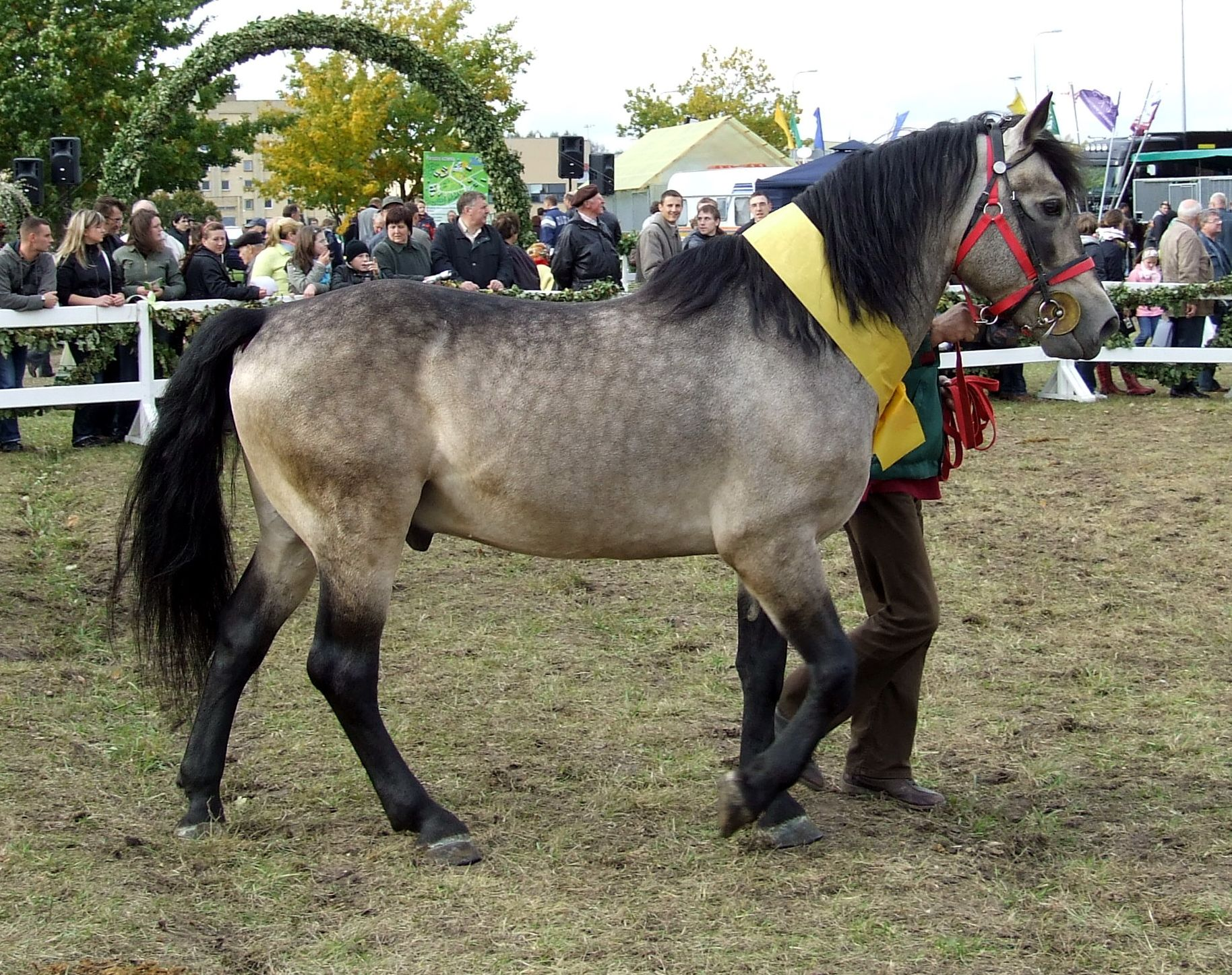
- Žemaitukas
- Conservation status: DOM
- Other names: Zhmud, Zhemaichu
- Country of origin: Lithuania

The Žemaitukas (plural: Žemaitukai, literally: little Samogitian) is a historic horse breed from Lithuania. It may be classified as a pony, due to its relatively short stature (between 131–141 centimeters at the withers). Known from the 6–7th centuries, it was used as a war horse by the Lithuanians during the Northern Crusades and is hailed in Lithuania as part of the state's historic heritage. Its origin is uncertain; it is related to the Estonian Native and the Konik. The breed contributed to the foundation of the Trakehner. Once popular, the breed was brought to the brink of extinction by changing agricultural demands and World War II. As of 2010, the total population is estimated at 400 individuals.

== History ==
Known in written sources since the 6–7th centuries, the Žemaitukas became famous as an excellent war horse during the Northern Crusades. During the centuries, the breed was influenced by Tatar, Russian, light Polish, and other horses. Once widespread, the breed went almost extinct three times.

=== 19th century ===
In the 19th century, new agricultural machinery required taller and stronger horses. Therefore the horses were crossed with the Trakehners, Arabians, and draft horses, threatening survival of purebred Žemaitukas. The breed was saved by the Ogiński family, who established Žemaitukas breeding societies in Raseiniai, Plungė, and Rietavas between 1881 and 1890. The Ogińskis popularized the breed and exhibited it at the Paris International Agricultural Show in 1900 where the horses won two gold medals and one silver medal.

=== 20th century ===
At the end of World War II, the Germans took all Žemaitukas horses from the Gruzdžiai stud farm. A single stud was found in 1958 in Užventis. The stud was transferred to the Vilnius State Stud Farm, where a new generation of Žemaitukas horses was bred.

=== After USSR's dissolution ===
A new challenge was presented by the dissolution of the Soviet Union and rapid de-collectivization in 1990. Horses that belonged to the kolkhozes (collective farms) were distributed to private owners, who often showed little interest in the survival of the breed. In 1994, only 30 adult individuals remained. However, the Vilnius State Stud Farm preserved its horses and remains the major breeding center. As of 2010, it had 98 Žemaitukas horses.

== Breed characteristics ==
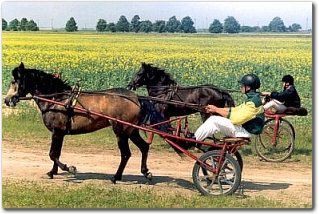
Žemaitukai in harness

Arabian blood was added during the 19th century, giving the horse an Arab-type head, including the characteristic dish-shaped Arabian profile. The infusion of Arabian blood created two subtypes of the Žemaitukas: those with Arabian ancestry were considered suitable for riding, while the other, more closely related to the indigenous horses, was better adapted to farm work. After World War II, the distinction was muted. With limited crossbreeding with North Swedish Horse, a deliberate effort was made to increase the size and bulk of the animals so that they could be used for both riding and draft work.

The ponies are said to be hardy, possessing excellent stamina, disease resistant, and displaying a willing temperament. It is now a multi-purpose breed; it is ridden, used in farm work, and crossed with lighter and larger breeds to produce sport horses. The horses are usually a dun color and often display the primeval dorsal stripe, but they may also be brown, bay, black, or palomino. The Žemaitukas generally stands 1.28–1.42 m (4 ft 2 in – 4 ft 8 in) high, placing it among the taller pony breeds.

As with other domestic animals around the world, studies have been carried out on this horse's genetic heritage, since it may possess unique characteristics. Maternal DNA sequencing indicated that one of its haplotypes is similar to an old haplotype present in horse breeds of the North East European area. In 2004 study, scientists discovered allele T, common among the Žemaitukas and observed only a few times among all other tested horse breeds. The FAO Mission Conference for Central and Eastern European countries recognized the Žemaitukas as an internationally watched breed, and included it into the FAO World Watch List for Domestic Animal Diversity.
