= Tabun (horse breeding) =

Extensive horse breeding system in Eastern Europe and Central Asia

A tabun, or taboon (in Belarusian, Russian, and Ukrainian: Табун, herd), is an extensive breeding system for horses, under the supervision of herder horsemen, known as tabuntshik. (Russian: табунщик, composed of Табун with a suffix derived from Turkic languages -щик). Tabuns can be extremely large, comprising up to 200 horses.

The tabun may refer to a herd of wild horses. By extension, the term tabun also applies to the enclosure where the horses are kept.

The size of the herd has several meanings: it can refer to a large herd of horses, sometimes reaching up to 40,000, but the term is also used by the Kazakhs to describe a group of 8 to 10 horses managed in a semi-wild state

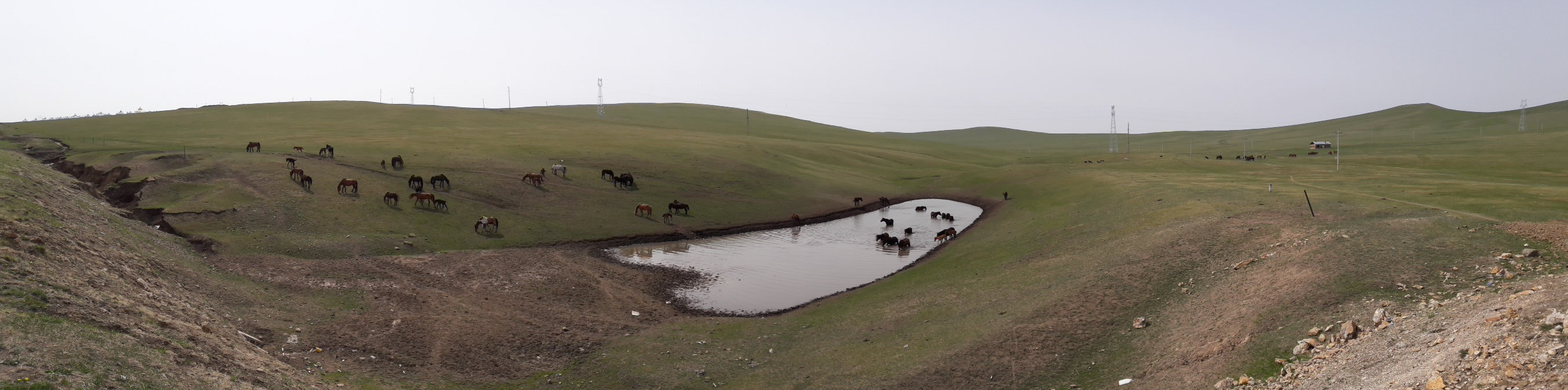
A tabun in Hulunbuir, Inner Mongolia.

== See also ==
- Manade
- Stud farm
- Herd
