= Lithuanian Heavy Draught =

Lithuanian breed of horse

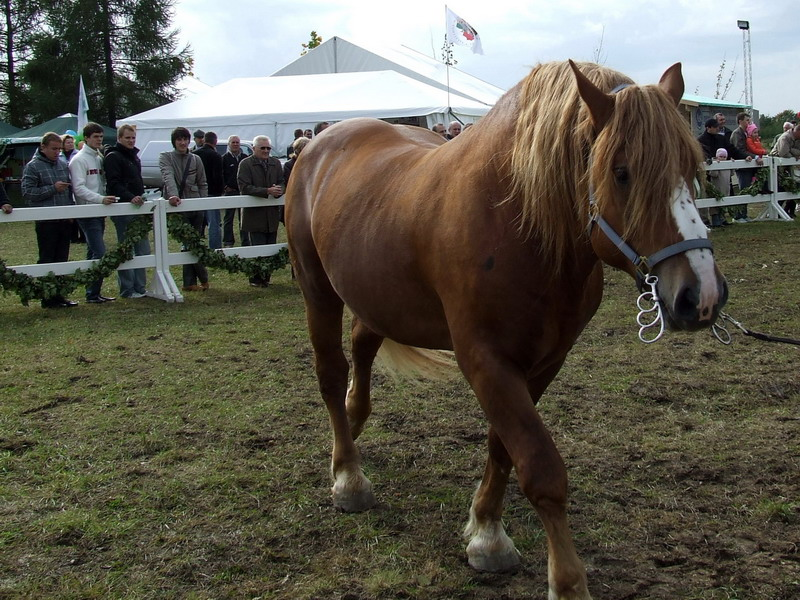
- Lithuanian Heavy Draught horse
- Other names: Lithuanian Heavy Draft
- Country of origin: Lithuania

The Lithuanian Heavy Draught is a draught horse breed created in Lithuania during the 19th and 20th centuries. They are used mainly for heavy draught and farm work, as well as meat production and the improvement of other breeds. The breed is currently near extinction..

== History ==
The Lithuanian Heavy Draught was created during the late 19th century by crossing local Zhmud mares with Ardennes, Percheron, Brabant, and other heavy breeds. The breeding was overseen by the Lithuanian Society for Breeding Work and Driving Horses beginning in 1894. In 1923 additional heavy horses were imported from the Netherlands to re-establish the breed following World War I, and in 1925, 2000, and 2001 additional Ardennes horses were imported from Sweden.

Initially, Lithuanian Heavy Draughts were included into herd books as Ardennes crossbreds. A breed-specific herd book was issued from 1951 to 1996. The herd books for Lithuanian Heavy Draughts are now issued by the Lithuanian Horse Breeders Association, with purebred Lithuanian Draughts identified by their colour, conformation, and markings. In 1964 there were 62,000 Lithuanian Heavy Draughts in Lithuania. Recently, there has been a dramatic decrease in the breed population, with stallion numbers declining and breeding and working conditions deteriorating. Currently, the breed is close to extinction, with less than 1000 horses thought to exist as of 2003.

== Characteristics ==
The Lithuanian Heavy Draught generally stands 15 to 16 hands high, and may be bay, chestnut, black, grey or roan. Overall the breed is large and solid. The head is well-proportioned with a straight profile and heavy jaw. The neck is short, muscular, and arched, the withers broad and moderately pronounced and the chest wide, deep and muscular. The back is long, and generally straight, although it can be slightly dipped, and the croup rounded, long and muscled. The legs are short, solid, and muscular with broad, strong joints and well-formed hooves. Defects occasionally shown include a coarse head and an excessively dipped back.

== Uses ==
The Lithuanian Heavy Draught is used mainly for heavy draught and farm work. In Lithuania draught capacity testing began in 1857, and since 2002 the Lithuanian Horse Breeders Association has taken over the responsibility of heavy horse testing. Recently, more have begun to be exported for meat. They are also used to improve other breeds. When crossed with native Altai horses, they improved the meat and milk yield and also increased the weight, growth rate, and ability to withstand year-round grazing conditions.
