= Reipas =

Finnhorse trotter

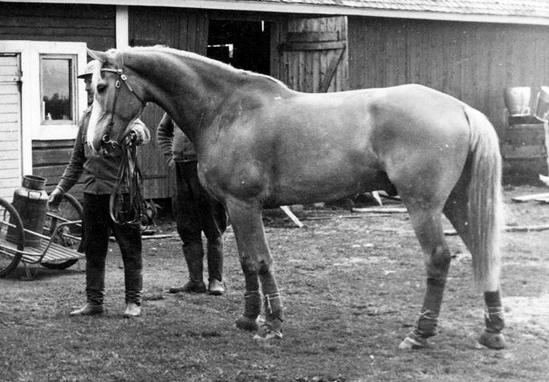
- 11-year-old Reipas at home in Kortesjärvi
- Breed: Finnhorse
- Sire: Murtimo 3642
- Grandsire: Murto 2306
- Dam: Buge 56574
- Maternal grandsire: Noron-Hessu 3105
- Sex: gelding
- Foaled: July 14, 1948
- Country: Finland
- Colour: light chestnut
- Breeder: Lauri Ylikoski
- Owner: Aapeli Miettinen
- Trainer: Aapeli Miettinen

Record
- ca. 1300: 348-115-57-43 best time 1:24.4 (per kilometre)

Earnings
- over FIM 1,000,000 in 1958–1960 (ca. EUR 20,000)

Major wins
- Finnhorse Grand Championship 1960, 1963

Awards
- first Finnish horse to earn over FIM 1,000,000 in one season

Honours
- Restaurant Reippaantalli, statue in the town centre of Varpaisjärvi

Reipas (July 14, 1948 – September 20, 1971) was a successful Finnish trotter. He was a Finnhorse gelding, and the first Finnish horse to earn over one million marks in one season.

Reipas was the best earning trotter in Finland through 1958–1960, and his earnings each season exceeded one million Marks, corresponding roughly to EUR 20,000. He was owned and mostly driven by Aapeli Miettinen. Reipas competed in 1952–1965, winning 348 of his approximately 1300 heats. His greatest win count in one season was 62.

Being a gelding, Reipas never had offspring. His statue has been erected in the town centre of his home, Varpaisjärvi.

== Early life ==
Reipas was foaled in 1948 in Kortesjärvi, bred by Lauri Ylikoski. He was originally named Poju. Poju was intended to become a working horse, and was accordingly gelded. Soon afterwards, he was sold to Paavo Kontiainen from Evijärvi for 20,000 Marks, and Kontiainen then sold him in the Kokkola market. Poju was resold a few times more, always for a higher price, until he was bought by smallholder Aapeli Miettinen's son Väinö for 38,000 Marks. By then, Poju was three years old, and very thin and weak. The father wondered aloud why Väinö had bothered to bring such a "fur purse" all the way from the city. However, on good pasture, the barely walking Poju's condition soon improved, and Aapeli Miettinen traded him from his son for a five-year-old mare and 10,000 Marks. The now lively gelding was renamed Reipas ("Brisk").

== Racing career ==
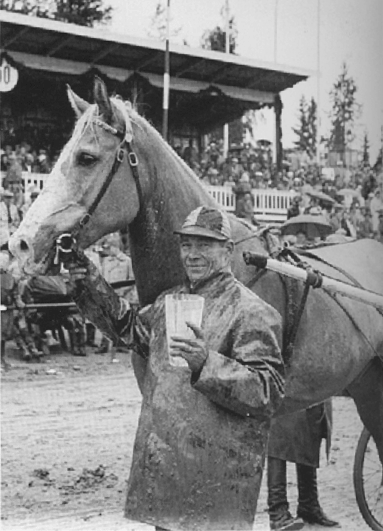
Reipas in the 1958 Kuninkuusravit race in Lahti

Reipas was first raced as a four-year-old in Korpinen, Varpaisjärvi on March 23, 1952, and won. During his first season, he only took part in three heats, and in the beginning of his second season, he was still entered in minor, local competitions. When Reipas was enrolled for the highest level heats of Kuopio in the autumn of 1953, the talents of the young and unknown gelding were greatly in doubt. However, Reipas won three of his four heats and came second in the fourth. In January 1954 Reipas won all four Kuopio heats he took part in. In July of the same year he set a new track record in Kuopio with his 2:59.2 for a 2 kilometre distance (1:29.6 per kilometre). This record made the six-year-old Reipas the third tähtijuoksija, "Star Runner" in Finland, and along with the stallion Akapeetus, the youngest horse to ever attain this title. The record was set in one of the four heats Reipas took part in during just two days.

The origins of Reipas were the subject of many rumours: he was suspected to be a market horse of unknown pedigree, or even a horse from the spoils of war from Russia. The rumours were cut short when Reipas' lines were investigated and his breeding traced from the start of the purchase chain. His sire turned out to be Murtimo 3642 (by Murto 2306), a racing stallion known for his good offspring, and his dam the never raced Buge 56574 (by Noron-Hessu 3105), whose movement had been reproached as "ineffective" in her studbook evaluation.

Reipas competed for a full season every year, from the ice track heats of January to the end of the season in September, sometimes taking part in four heats in a weekend. He never showed signs of being tired or discouraged. His trot remained fast and clean, and he rarely broke into a gallop. During the twelve years of his racing career Reipas took part in about 1300 heats, winning 348 them. In his six-year-old season in 1952, he won 62 heats. During his career, Reipas set a number of Finnish records and numerous track records. His personal best was 1:25.4, in a 1609-metre heat, or 1:24.4 calculated per kilometre.

In 1958, Reipas became the first Finnish horse to earn over one million Marks in one season. He broke the limit twice more, in 1959 and 1960. During these years he was the best earning horse in Finland. Reipas' winnings do not include, for instance, the large purses of the Kuninkuusravit Finnhorse championships, because as a gelding he was not qualified to take part. However, he twice won the Suurmestaruusajo championship, in 1960 and 1963.

In addition to regular racing, Reipas also took part in a few international mixed breed handicap races in 1958, competing against light trotters. In Käpylä, he finished seventh as the best Finnhorse, besting the renowned Russian mare Pichta. In the Moscow international heats, Reipas was fourth at his best.

== Retirement ==
After a career of thirteen years, Reipas' last season was in 1965. By April he had won four times and his season's best time was 1:33.4. Aapeli Miettinen kept Reipas after his active career ended, and turned down many offers to buy him. One of the best known offers, five trotters and a horse transport car, was made by Kalle Hagert, known as the "Gypsy King" to his contemporaries. Even after having retired, Reipas remained brisk, true to his name, and at the age of 20 years still brought home winnings from a race. Turned out on pasture, he once heard a neighbour playing the accordion, and thinking a heat was about to commence, trotted in a circle on his own. Pentti Miettinen, groom to Reipas for 15 years, described him as "extremely ardent, sensitive, and gentle-mouthed".

Reipas lived in Varpaisjärvi until being put down in 1971 at the age of 23. By then the restaurant Reippaantalli, "Reipas' Stable", had already been founded. In 1985, the local branch of Lions Club started planning to have a bronze statue made. The statue was sculpted by Herman joutsen and it was revealed in Varpaisjärvi on March 21, 1987.
