= Eri-Aaroni =

Finnhorse harness racer

Eri-Aaroni 3423 Valio
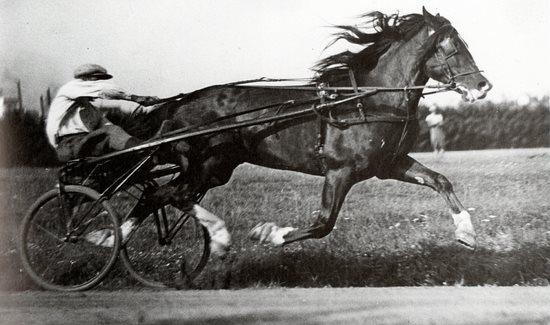
- 7-year-old Eri-Aaroni competing at the 1939 Kuninkuusravit
- Breed: Finnhorse
- Sire: Murto 2306
- Grandsire: Toimi 1102
- Dam: Upeva 1679-V
- Damsire: Sauli 1985
- Sex: Stallion
- Foaled: July 12, 1932
- Country: Finland
- Colour: Liver chestnut
- Breeder: Rintala Sulo, Seinäjoki
- Owner: Fritz Buttenhoff
- Trainer: Arvi Räikkönen
- Record: 27,8

Major wins
- Ravikuningas 1943

Awards
- made Valio (breeding champion) in 1952

Eri-Aaroni 3423 Valio (July 12, 1932 – September 1, 1953) was liver chestnut stallion who was a Ravikuningas title winner in harness racing and a very influential Finnhorse sire.

During his racing career, Eri-Aaroni became the holder of the Finnish harness racing speed record, a tähtijuoksija (Note: Tähtijuoksija, "star runner", record better than 30.0 per one kilometre; huippujuoksija, "top runner", record better than 35.0; suurjuoksija, "grand runner", record better than 40.0.) Being both a race horse and more noble and refined in appearance than most Finnhorses of the time, he did not conform to the contemporary working horse ideals, and never gained great success at horse shows. Nonetheless, in 1946, the horse breeding association of Laihia purchased Eri-Aaroni to stand at stud for the unpreceded price of two million Finnish marks. In Laihia, he sired hundreds of foals, of whom 22 were tähtijuoksija and five Kuninkuusravit title winners. Today, Eri-Aaroni is found in the pedigree of the majority of modern Finnhorses.

== Early life and racing career ==
Eri-Aaroni was foaled on July 12, 1932. He was bred by Sulo Rintala in Seinäjoki. He was by a stallion who was a Ravikuningas title winner and tähtijuoksija named Murto 2306, and out of the mare Upeva 1640-V, a 50.0-timed, well-conformed broodmare. The colt was brought as a weanling to Turku, and then purchased by, Albin Ahlqvist, who took him to Åland. Eri-Aaroni grew to be a handsome and noble-looking horse who differed from the contemporary ideals of Finnhorse breeding, which favored a stockier, work horse look. Ahlqvist raced Eri-Aaroni occasionally at Turku. Eri-Aaroni was noticed there, and horse dealer Matti Takanen bought him from Ahlqvist for 75,000 Finnish marks. Then, in 1937, the well-known horseman Fritz Buttenhoff bought the now 5-year-old Eri-Aaroni from Takanen for 100,000 marks, corresponding to c. 34,000 Euros, and took the stallion to his estate in Vyborg.

In Vyborg Eri-Aaroni was groomed, trained and raced by Arvi Räikkönen. In 1939 Eri-Aaroni, now 7 years old, broke the tähtijuoksija ghost limit of three minutes per two kilometres as he finished a heat held at Seinäjoki in 2 minutes and 59.9 seconds. By the end of the season he had improved his record to 2:28.2, or 29.1 calculated per one kilometre. His racing career came to a halt with the beginning of the Winter War, as Eri-Aaroni and his owner were evacuated to Suomenniemi and then Kirkkonummi. In August 1940 the stallion made a Finnish record with his 2:55.6 time for two kilometres (27.8). The record remained unbroken for nearly a decade. Before the war Eri-Aaroni had won dozens of full silver keepsake prizes and challenge cups, which were brought along with him. After the Continuation War began, Eri-Aaroni was raced very little: he participated in seven heats in 1941 and two heats the following year. The only war-time Kuninkuusravit championships were held in 1943. The event happened to take place during uneventful trench war, and Räikkönen, who served in the Finnish ranks, was given furlough to drive Eri-Aaroni in the competition. Eri-Aaroni had finished third in 1939, and now won.

== Breeding career and influence ==
During Eri-Aaroni's life, the official goal of Finnish horse breeding was to produce work horses. Eri-Aaroni's looks were "foreign", and although he did well in the obligatory pulling tests, he was not given any mentionable success in horse shows. In 1936, Eri-Aaroni was evaluated in a studbook inspection and accepted with the working section registration number 3423. The evaluation points awarded for him did not qualify him for even the lowest level prize. In 1939 he was re-evaluated and awarded with a third level prize. The best show success Eri-Aaroni gained as an individual was a second prize in 1946, when he had already proven his talent both as a record-breaking racehorse and a sire.

After the Continuation War ended in 1944, parts of Kirkkonummi were rented by the Soviet Union to host a military base, and Eri-Aaroni was evacuated again. He ended up in Porvoo, and finally in Nastola. From his time in Åland, he had sired about 300 foals. In 1946 the horse breeding association of Laihia made an offer to purchase him from Buttenhoff, despite the fact that the horse population in Laihia was already widely influenced by his sire, Murto. Buttenhoff agreed to sell as he had become disabled by rheumatoid arthritis, and Räikkönen, the groom and trainer of Eri-Aaroni, was planning to become a farmer. Multiple horse breeding associations had expressed interest to purchase the stallion, but Buttenhoff chose to sell to Laihia because he heard the mare population of Laihia was of high quality. Eri-Aaroni was sold for 2,000,000 Finnish marks, corresponding to c. 680,000 Euros. It was the highest price ever paid for a horse in Finland.

Eri-Aaroni proved to be successful at stud. During his first breeding season in Laihia, his pregnancy rate was 75.2 percent. He was accurate in detecting whether a mare was in oestrus or not, and did not attempt to serve pregnant mares. However, he also was uninterested in serving nursing mares, which was problematic. During the busiest peaks of breeding seasons Eri-Aaroni had to serve mares as often as every three hours, but as he ate well, he did not grow weak.

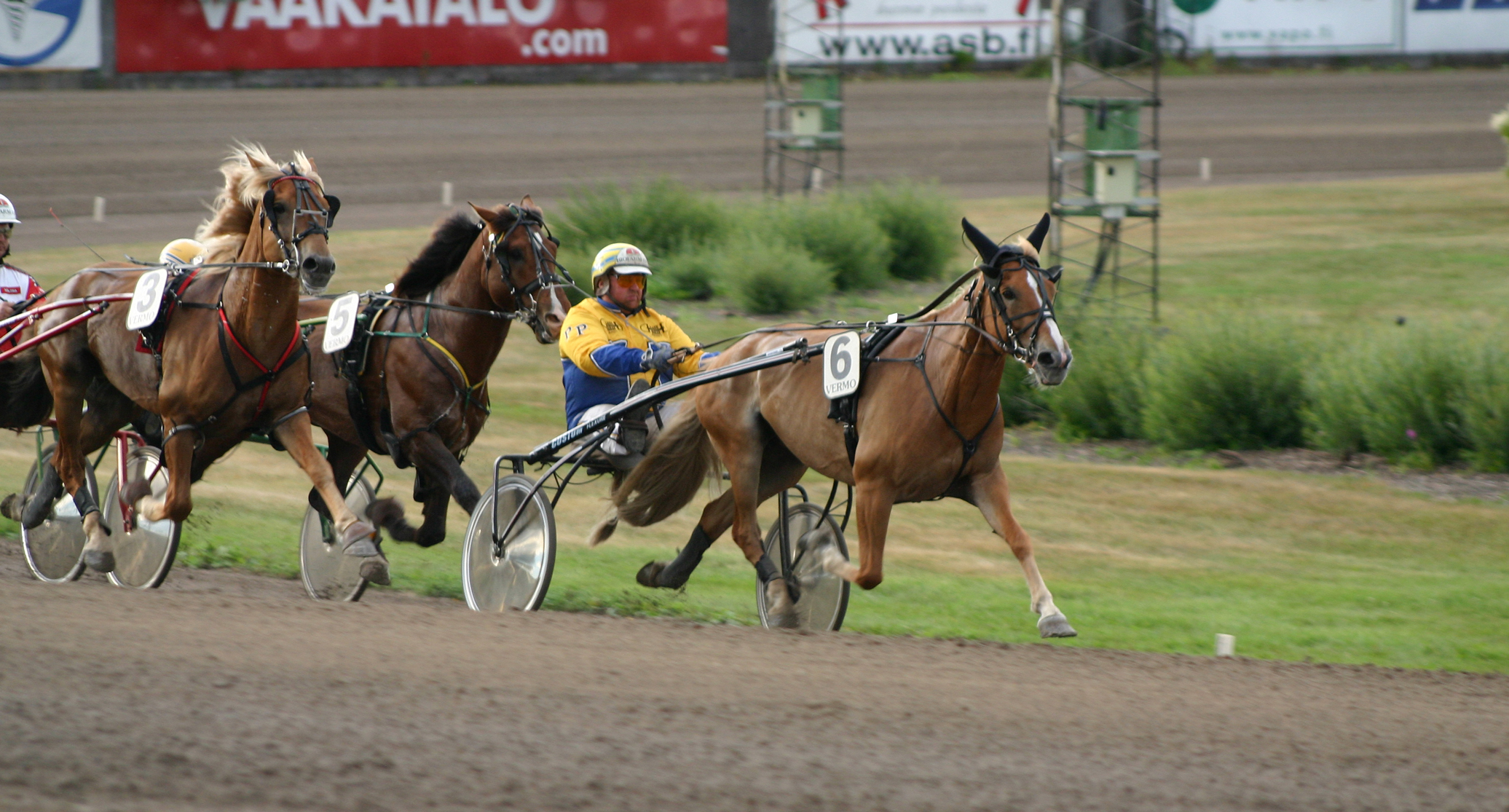
I.P. Vipotiina (pictured leading) is a seventh-generation paternal line descendant of Eri-Aaroni and one of the many Kuninkuusravit title winners descending from him

In Laihia, Eri-Aaroni sired dozen of foals each year, and more than 200 during the best years. His stud fee was exceptionally high, 15,000 marks, corresponding to about 5000 Euros. He sired more than 1100 offspring, of which 73 became suur-, 24 huippu-, and 22 tähtijuoksija. Of his first generation offspring, 4 stallions and 1 mare became winners of Kuninkuusravit titles; 6 stallions and 11 mares were made breeding champions; 167 stallions and 381 mares were accepted for the Finnhorse studbook. In state horse shows, Eri-Aaroni was finally rewarded when three times he was granted the first prize for his offspring. In 1952 he was one of the first horses to ever receive the title of a breeding champion. His influence in the Finnhorse breed remained significant, and by the 1990s, more than 90 percent of Finnhorses were descended from him via one or more lines.

In 1952 the previously healthy and strong Eri-Aaroni suffered from colic a few times, although with good treatment he recovered well. However, in August 1953 he came down with a particularly dramatic case, which was further complicated by laminitis. Eri-Aaroni died on September 1.

== Pedigree ==
Eri-Aaroni had unusually noble looks and in certain circles was suspected of not being purebred. As late as in 1992, Suomen kuvalehti published a story where a veterinarian named Gösta Broberg claimed it "commonly known today" that Eri-Aaroni had been foaled in Sweden by a warmblood trotter named David's Boy, and that he had been brought to Finland for slaughter value as a two-year-old. Nonetheless, the prevailing view held that Eri-Aaroni, with his dark chestnut color and prominent markings, strongly resembled Murto, who was properly credited to be his sire. Earlier Murto had been the target of similar suspicion.

Pedigree of Eri-Aaroni
Sire Murto 2306 29.4ke	Toimi 1102 50.0ke	Sopusointu 207; 37.2	Poke ro Ylihärmä 50.0
Sire Murto 2306 29.4ke	Toimi 1102 50.0ke	Sopusointu 207; 37.2	Sorja 25a-SÖ
Sire Murto 2306 29.4ke	Toimi 1102 50.0ke	Peuha 856-EP	Tuisku ro Kortesjärvi
Sire Murto 2306 29.4ke	Toimi 1102 50.0ke	Peuha 856-EP	Vappu (of Ojala)
Sire Murto 2306 29.4ke	Hilppa (of Erkkilä) -	Ilkka (of Erkkilä)	Nöyrä 201 2:16.2
Sire Murto 2306 29.4ke	Hilppa (of Erkkilä) -	Ilkka (of Erkkilä)	Kirppa (Piku)
Sire Murto 2306 29.4ke	Hilppa (of Erkkilä) -	Vilppu 800-EP	Polli (in Vähäkyrö, f. 1895)
Sire Murto 2306 29.4ke	Hilppa (of Erkkilä) -	Vilppu 800-EP	Minna (in Vähäkyrö)
Dam Upeva 1679-V 50.0	Sauli 1985; 55.0	Sopusointu 207; 37.2	Poke ro Ylihärmä 50.0
Dam Upeva 1679-V 50.0	Sauli 1985; 55.0	Sopusointu 207; 37.2	Sorja 25a-SÖ
Dam Upeva 1679-V 50.0	Sauli 1985; 55.0	Vakaantyttö 2383-EP	Eino-Vakaa 25 33.9
Dam Upeva 1679-V 50.0	Sauli 1985; 55.0	Vakaantyttö 2383-EP	Vappu (by Urpi Tt 2755)
Dam Upeva 1679-V 50.0	Kreeta 832-EP -	Poke ro Ylihärmä; 50.0	Poke ro Urjala
Dam Upeva 1679-V 50.0	Kreeta 832-EP -	Poke ro Ylihärmä; 50.0	unknown
Dam Upeva 1679-V 50.0	Kreeta 832-EP -	Vappu (of Luoma)	unknown
Dam Upeva 1679-V 50.0	Kreeta 832-EP -	Vappu (of Luoma)	unknown

== Sources ==
- Aalto, Jouni (1995). "Eri-Aaroni, Merkitykseltään kestävä" [Eri-Aaroni, of lasting influence]. Tammen Suuri Hevoskirja 3. Tammi. ISBN 951-31-0515-6.
- Raevuori, Antero; et al., eds. (1982). "Eri-Aaroni - hevosten Tauno Palo" [Eri-Aaroni 0 the Tauno Palo of horses]. Suuri Suomalainen Ravikirja. WSOY: 42–45. ISBN 951-0-11192-9.
- Toivonen, Veijo, ed. (2008). "Matti Torkko löysi Eri-Aaronin uudestaan ja haki sen takaisin synnyinmaakuntaansa" [Matti Torkko refound Eri-Aaroni and brought him back to the province where he was foaled]. Hevoset Etukaarteessa. Arkmedia: 26–38. ISBN 978-952-67028-1-0.
