= Crown stallion system =

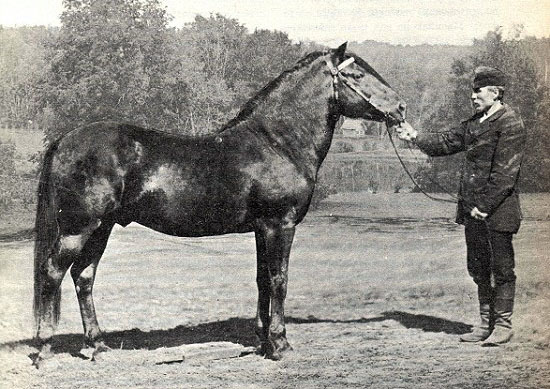
Jaakko tt 118 is one of the founding sires of the Finnhorse. He served as a crown stallion in Längelmäki through 1873-1874.

The crown stallion system (Finnish: ruununorijärjestelmä) was an early state-initiated horse breeding programme in Finland. Its aim was to improve the Finnish horse population by providing state-owned stallions for public use. It was later replaced with the Finnhorse studbook, founded in 1907.

== Motive and development ==
The great famine of 1866-1868 had a devastating effect on the Finnish horse population. Many breeders were compelled to sell their best stallions to Russia for money as a desperate measure, and large numbers of horses were slaughtered for food.

To make up for the loss of valuable breeding animals, and to aid the rebuilding of the horse population, the Senate of Finland sent orders in 1869 to the provinces of Vaasa, Häme and Kuopio, ordering them to obtain suitable stallions to be publicly owned and made available to local residents for breeding to privately owned mares. Later, funding was appropriated for this purpose, and with it came generalized instructions for eight provinces to each obtain four stallions. Still later, Finland was subdivided into one hundred breeding districts (Finnish: ruununoripiiri), and each district was to have one state stallion. However, most years, some breeding districts lacked a stallion due to the scarcity of good quality horses. The stallions purchased and used in this programme were called "crown stallions" (Finnish: ruununori, ruununoriit), at first informally, but eventually as an official designation. The abbreviation "ro" became part of the name of each crown stallion; animals were further distinguished by their breeding districts; for example, the stallion Poke who stood at Urjala was officially "Poke ro Urjala", and his son, also named Poke, but who stood in a different district, was "Poke ro Ylihärmä".

== Selection ==
Official instructions were never given about the size, workability, or even bloodlines of crown stallions, and the only common aim in horse breeding was to increase height and weight. Before the turn of the 20th century, public discussion had not reached consensus on what was wanted from the breeding of Finnish horses. Only one thing was agreed on: Finland needed working horses. This led to great diversity in phenotype prior to the establishment of the Finnhorse stud book. Originally, stallions were selected by committees consisting of both local people and state officials such as agronomists, veterinarians, military officers, or farm owners. In 1893, the job switched over to the newly created civil service position of the horse husbandry director Finnish: hevoshoidonneuvoja). The first to hold this post was the agronomist and farm owner Ernst Fabritius.

== Leasing ==
Crown stallions were leased to private individuals for caretaking, often determined by holding a public auction where the winner was the person who agreed to take the stallion for the smallest amount of compensation. Care of a crown stallion was to some degree a burden: the caretaker had a heavy responsibility because the horse was the state's property. Caretakers had to accept an obligation to have at least one person available to care for the horse and keep the stallion available to the public for servicing mares during the breeding season, even though it was also the time when every available hand was needed for spring fieldwork. However, the task was also highly desired in spite of the burdens because the caretaker was allowed to keep all stud fees, and, after the stallion sired 60 live foals, the caretaker could obtain ownership of the animal itself. In the case of less popular stallions who sired few foals, a caretaker could keep the animal after six years of service. Problems arose from the fact that the terms and conditions of the caretaking system often allowed the change in ownership far too soon—a number of the most popular stallions managed to achieve the required 60 foals in a year. While the government could attempt to renew the contract, by the time a stallion's value in breeding had been proved, the horse often had already been taken into private ownership and was no longer available to the public. However, in spite of its shortcomings, the crown stallion system allowed enlightened farmers to have control of the direction needed for the breeding of good working horses.

The crown stallion system was made obsolete and discontinued by the time the Finnhorse studbook was founded in 1907, and official regulations for accepting breeding animals were set.
