= Finnhorse =

Breed of horse

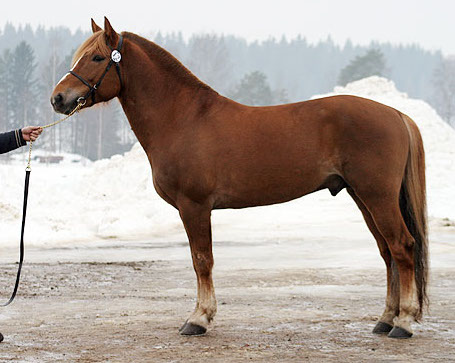
- Finnhorse stallion, trotter section
- Other names: Finnish Horse, Finnish Universal
- Country of origin: Finland

Traits
- Distinguishing features: Dry and strongly muscled, with strong bone and good hooves. Most often of chestnut colour.

Breed standards
- Hippos

The Finnhorse or Finnish Horse (Finnish: suomenhevonen [ˈsuo̯menˌheʋonen], literally "horse of Finland"; Swedish: finskt kallblod, literally "finnish cold-blood") is a horse breed with both riding horse and draught horse influences and characteristics, and is the only breed developed fully in Finland. In English it is sometimes called the Finnish Universal, as the Finns consider the breed capable of fulfilling all of Finland's horse needs, including agricultural and forestry work, harness racing, and riding. In 2007, the breed was declared the official national horse breed of Finland.

The Finnhorse is claimed to be among the fastest and most versatile "coldblood" breeds in the world. In Finland, the term "universal horse" is used to describe the Finnhorse and breeds such as the Fjord horse that are relatively small with a body type that is heavy for a riding horse but light for a draught. There are four separate sections within the Finnhorse stud book, each with different goals: to develop a heavier working horse, a lighter trotter type, a versatile riding horse, and a pony-sized animal. The combined breed standard for all four sections defines the breed as a strong, versatile horse with pleasant disposition. The average height of the breed is 15.1 hands (61 inches, 155 cm), and the most typical colour is chestnut, often with white markings and a flaxen mane and tail.

The exact origins of the early Finnish horse are currently not known. Because the Finnhorse breed and its progenitors were the only horses in Finland for centuries, the history of horses in Finland parallels the history of the Finnhorse itself. The documented history of the distinct breed begins at the turn of the 13th century. Outside influences by many light and warmblood breeds were recorded beginning in the 16th century, making the breed larger and more usable. An official Finnhorse studbook was founded in 1907, producing purebred animals in significant numbers for many years. Due to mechanisation of agriculture and the dismantling of Finnish horse cavalry in the late 20th century, the Finnhorse population plummeted from a high of just over 400,000 animals in the 1950s to a low of 14,100 in 1987. However, the breed managed to survive thanks to its popularity for harness racing and its versatility as a mount.

== Breed characteristics ==
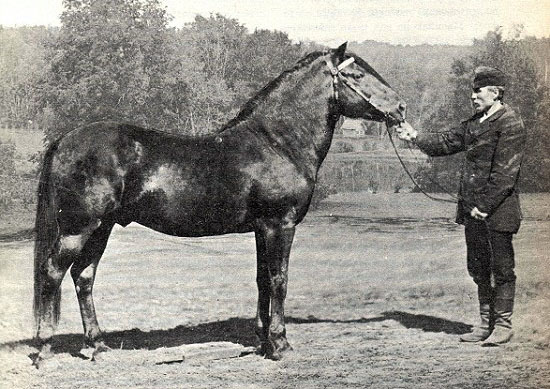
A founding sire, Jaakko (Tt 118), photographed in 1882

The breed standard defines the Finnhorse as a multi-purpose horse of average height and sturdy conformation. The ideal Finnhorse is easy-to-handle, versatile, and combines strength, agility, speed and endurance. Finnhorses are lively, with both a reliable and alert temperament. The breed standard encourages a horse that is "honest and sincere": eager to cooperate with humans, obedient, and willing to work. They are hardy with good endurance, robust health, and are generally long-lived. The breed standard describes the head of a Finnhorse as dry and the profile straight, not long or convex, with well-spaced, short ears. The neck should be well-shaped and not underslung or ewe-necked; the body should be on the long side, but rounded and proportionate; and the croup should neither be level nor with a too-high connection to the tail. Finnhorses are strongly muscled, with good bone, sturdy "dry" legs, and strong hooves.

Finnhorses typically have thick manes and tails, and the legs have light feathering. The average height is 15.1 hands (61 inches, 155 cm). Pony-sized Finnhorses—under 14.2 hands (58 inches, 147 cm)—exist and are licensed for breeding in a separate section of the stud book. Finnhorses have good gaits that are regular with elasticity, and relatively low, steady action. They are fast for a coldblooded breed, known as good trotting horses and used for harness racing.

There are four separate breed sections in the Finnhorse studbook, and a Finnhorse's overall conformation should be typical of the section in which it is recorded, though some horses are registered in multiple sections.

=== Colours ===
Over 90 percent of Finnhorses today are chestnut. Flaxen manes and tails as well as white markings on the face and legs are common. As of 2007, 6 percent are bay and 1.2 percent black. Roans, palominos, buckskins and silver dapples exist in smaller numbers. The genes for other cream dilutions and rabicano are present in the gene pool. A distinctive sabino, non-SB1 pattern is moderately common, but is usually minimally expressed due to the selective colour breeding of the 20th century. A single white horse, registered as pinto and deemed "sabino-white," has been recorded in the modern history of the breed. The number of non-chestnuts is increasing due to dedicated breeding for other colours, and as of 2009, a few dozen black and grey Finnhorses exist. SW1, one of the genes responsible for the splashed white markings, has been found in individuals by genetic testing.

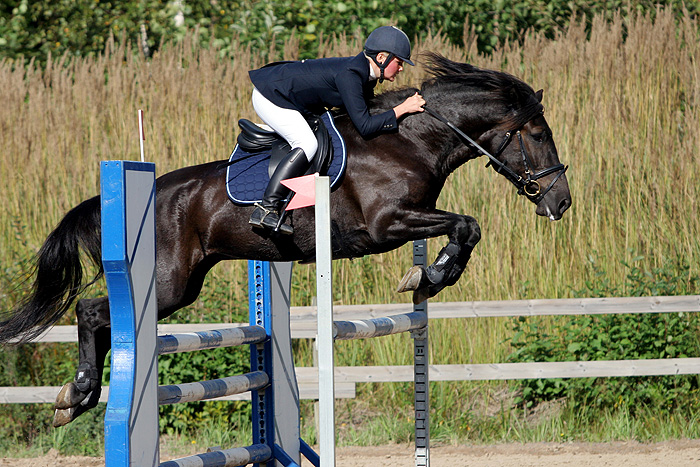
Black is one of the rarest Finnhorse colours

Through the 18th and 19th centuries, chestnut in various shades was the prevailing colour of Finnish horses, making up about 40–50 percent of the breed, and bays, blacks and greys existed in much greater numbers than today: 34 percent were bay, 16 percent black, and the remaining 3 percent were grey, palomino or spotted. Wide blazes and high leg markings were rare, unlike today; bold markings became common only in the 20th century.

The change came about through selective breeding. At the turn of the 20th century, when a nationalistic spirit was high, the Finnhorse began to be considered a symbol of Finland, and purebreeding became very popular. In addition, chestnut colour was officially chosen as an official aim for breeding as the "utmost original" colour of the Finnhorse, and named the "Hippos colour" after Hevoskasvatusyhditys Hippos, the name of the recently founded Finnish national horse breeding association (now Suomen Hippos). Any colours other than chestnut were considered evidence of "foreign" blood, and the goal was to make the Finnhorse an all-chestnut breed. The breeding regulation of 1909 stated that no stallion "with coat of white, grey, palomino or spotted" could be accepted into the stud book. The popularity of bay and black Finnhorses dropped as well, and at least one mare was removed from the stud book solely because of her bay colour. Selective breeding combined with the export of horses in colours popular in neighbouring countries, especially bays into Sweden, and made chestnut the prevailing colour. In the earliest section of the first Finnhorse studbook, 105 of the stallions listed were chestnut and only 8 were bay. There were stallions of other colours as well, but they were not included in the first book. At one point, chestnuts made up more than 96 percent of the breed.

Because of the vigorous colour breeding for chestnut in the early 20th century, combined with a genetic bottleneck resulting from the low number of Finnhorses that existed in the 1980s, colours such as grey and cream dilutions were preserved only by a few minor breeders. In the 1980s there were fewer than ten grey and palomino Finnhorses combined. All Finnhorse carriers of the cream gene today descend from a single maternal line, founded by the palomino mare Voikko (literally, "Palomino") who lived in the 1920s. While both cream dilution and black are rare, there are some known smoky blacks in the breed, the first of which was a filly foaled in 2009, identified as smoky black and confirmed as such by a DNA test in 2010. The filly is considered "if not the first ever, at least the first in a long long time." In April 2010, a filly appearing to be a double cream dilute was born, sired by a buckskin and out of a palomino. She was blue-eyed and had "pink skin and very pale coat", and was officially recognised as a double cream dilute.

The roan colour is rare, and today is passed on via a single dam line that descends from the strawberry roan mare Sonja, foaled in 1936. As of 2010, only six confirmed roan Finnhorses exist, all descendants of a 1987 mare, Taika-Tyttö, great-great-granddaughter of Sonja. The second-to-last roan line died out with the passing of the 1981 stallion Jesper Jr, who had no offspring. Grey exists in one dam line, descending from mare Pelelaikka, especially through her maternal grandson E.V. Johtotähti 1726-93Ta, an award-winning stallion. The second-last grey line died in 2010 with the 1988 mare Iiris 2275-88R, who had no grey offspring.

The silver dapple gene survived for two reasons. First, it only affects black colour and therefore is "masked" in chestnuts. Second, when it does act on black and bay base coats, it produces a chestnut-like phenotype. Silver dapple bays were long registered as "cinnamon chestnuts", and silver dapple blacks as "flaxen-maned dark chestnuts".

== Breed sections ==
The Finnhorse stud book was created in 1907. Today it has four sections: the Working section (T; draught type), Trotter section (J), Riding section (R) and Pony-sized section (P) In 1924, the first split in the stud book was created, with the working or draught type (Finnish: työlinja) horses in one section, and the "all-around" or "universal" lighter trotting horses in another. In 1965, this all-around section was renamed the trotter section. In 1971, this lighter horse section was divided into three parts: the trotter (Finnish: juoksijalinja), riding (Finnish: ratsulinja) and pony-sized (Finnish: pienhevoslinja) types. Today, the majority of Finnhorses are of trotter type.

=== Draught type ===
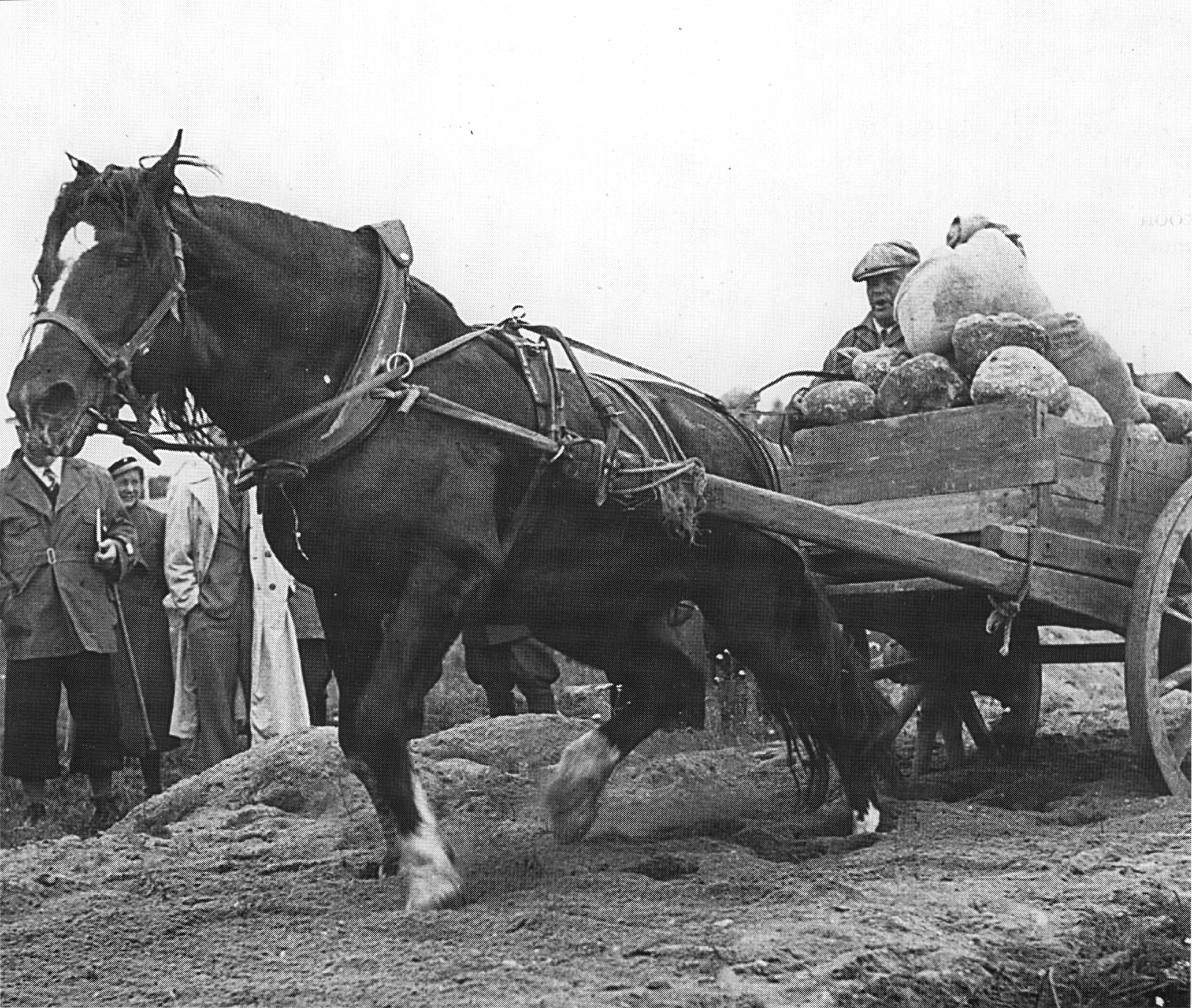
Draught-type stallion Murron-Ryhti 3531 pulling a stone cart at a pulling competition in the 1930s, exhibiting the typical low, effective pulling stature of the breed.

The working or draught type is the oldest of the Finnhorse types, and has had its own separate breeding section since the studbook was first split in 1924. Though the oldest of the Finnhorse types, it is rare today, with a total of only about 1,000 horses registered in the working section as of 2004. Draught-type Finnhorses are heavier and have a longer body than horses of the trotter and riding types. Though relatively small compared to other draught breeds, Finnhorses have considerable pulling power and can pull very heavy loads because of the breed's good pulling technique, with powerful take-off and a low, efficient body stature during the actual pulling. The Finnish Draught type is, pound for pound, stronger than many larger draught breeds. An average horse in draught work is capable of pulling about 80 percent of its own weight, while a Finnhorse can pull as much as 110 percent. In work horse competitions, the best Finnhorses can achieve even higher results, pulling more than 200 percent of their own body weight.

A draught-type horse must pass two tests in the studbook evaluation: a walking test and either a pulling or a general drivability test. The points given for the horse's performance in these tests are added to those given for its temperament and gaits, resulting in the final workability score. The horse is also given a score for its conformation. In addition to achieving the minimum scores for both workability and conformation, stallions accepted for the working-horse section of the stud book are required to trot 1,000 metres (1,100 yd) in less than 2 minutes and 30 seconds.

=== Trotter type ===
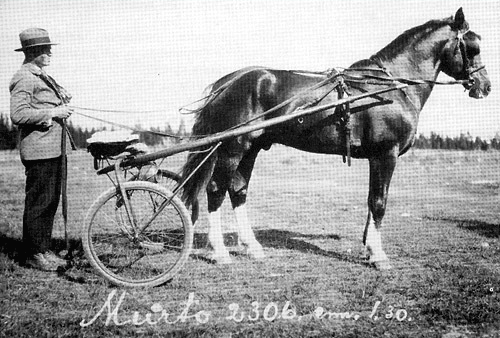
Murto 2306 (b. 1917) was ahead of his time both in speed and type. His light, "foreign" looks combined with flashy markings almost kept him out of the studbook, but once at stud he proved highly successful, and became exceedingly influential in the breed, especially through his son Eri-Aaroni.

The trotter type is the lightest Finnhorse. A trotter section horse should be of light conformation yet muscular, with a relatively long body and long legs. At the studbook evaluation, a trotter-type horse must meet the standards in racing results and/or in breeding value index as decreed by Suomen Hippos. A trotter's disposition is evaluated during the drivability test. However, type is not part of the studbook evaluation standard for trotters.

The trotter type has existed as a separate breeding section since 1965, when the "universal horse" section of the Finnhorse studbook was renamed and replaced by the trotter section. While the total number of Finnhorses dropped during the 20th century, the popularity of harness racing turned Finnhorse birthrates around from the historical lows of the 1970s and 1980s. Today, approximately 2,000 Finnhorses are in training and 3,000 compete in harness racing. The official Finnhorse racing championship Kuninkuusravit began in 1924 and has been held annually ever since, attracting tens of thousands of spectators.

The Finnhorse is slower to mature than lighter breeds, and thus usually enters harness racing competition at the age of four. However, its build withstands competition better than light trotters, and the breed's effective competition career can be very long. The Finnish harness racing bylaws allow Finnhorses to be raced from ages 3 to 16.

For a "coldblood" breed, the Finnhorse is quite fast. The official Finnish coldblood record from 2010 is 19,9aly, was long held by the quintuple Finnhorse racing champion stallion Viesker, but was finally broken by Jokivarren Kunkku in 2015 (19,5x) The coldblood horse world record in harness racing was long held by Finnhorses, until in 2005 the record was broken by Järvsöfaks, a Scandinavian coldblood trotter from Sweden. As of 2010, the official Finnish record for mares, and the world record for coldblood mares, is 20.2aly, held by the double Finnhorse racing female champion I.P. Vipotiina. The absolute Finnhorse speed record is 19.4aly, held by the stallion Sipori. As the result was not achieved from a win, the time is not an official Finnish record. Finnhorses have been so successful against other coldblood trotter breeds of Scandinavia, that by the 21st century, they have been admitted to Swedish and Norwegian races only by invitation.

Some conformation flaws common in the breed that may hinder a trotter's success include a heavy forehand and overangulated hind legs. Another problem that affects some Finnhorses is a tendency to trot with the front and hind legs directly in line with other, which creates a high probability of forging, where the hind hooves hit the front pasterns, which can cause breaking gait. This can be helped to a degree with careful shoeing. There is also a tendency toward ossification of the hoof cartilages of the front feet, which tends to increase with age, and appears to be heritable. This condition, called sidebone when it affects the lateral and medial cartilages of the foot, is common in draught breeds. However, a study of affected Finnhorses also noted that horses with long toes and low heels were common and ossification correlated with the length of the heels.

=== Riding horse type ===
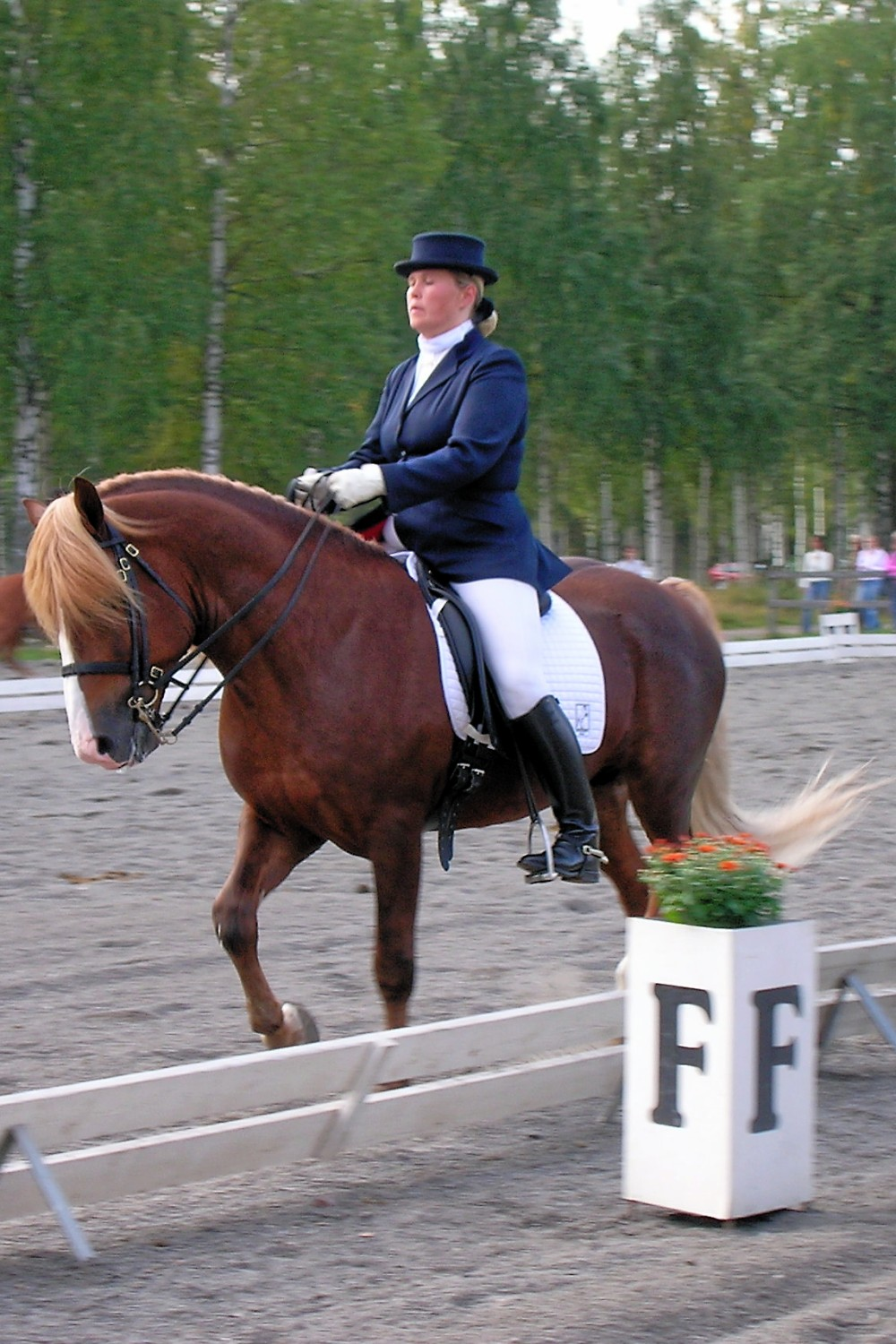
Finnhorse stallion competing in dressage

The riding horse section Finnhorse is a capable and reliable mount. It lacks some traits required for competing at the highest levels of international riding sports, but its combination of size and good temperament makes it suitable for both adults and children. To qualify for the riding section, a horse must carry itself well, and have a long neck, small head, sloping shoulder and well-defined withers. The body must not be too long. The universal Finnhorse breeding goals have made the breed of a lighter build, with longer neck, better gaits and fewer faults in conformation, allowing modern riding-type Finnhorses to work more easily on the bit. Even the temperament of the riding section animals appears to have become more lively. To pass the studbook evaluation, a riding type horse must either have placed in a Grade IV dressage or combined driving competition, or pass a dressage test; must pass a jumping evaluation and a ridability test, and possess clean gaits. Mares may be qualified solely on grounds of a ridability test and a movement evaluation.

Despite the Finnhorse's image as a working farm horse, the breed was used as a cavalry mount from the 17th century until the end of World War II. After the mechanisation of Finnish agriculture in the 1960s and the 1970s, however, it was not clear if the Finnhorse would make the transition into a riding horse, even though the long use of the breed by the Finnish cavalry had proven it well-suited for the job. The Finnhorse had a strong image as a harnessed working horse, associated with rural life and old times. When riding as a hobby emerged and became more established in Finnish cities during the 1960s, imported horses and ponies were preferred as mounts; warmblooded horses represented modern times, leisure time and wealth, while the Finnhorse was viewed as rugged and unsophisticated. The riding section studbook, created in 1971, grew slowly and gained only a few dozen horses during its first decade, as the idea of a Finnhorse used for riding was considered near-ridiculous at the time.

The Suomenratsut ry (SuoRa, or "Finnmounts") organisation was founded in 1974 to promote the use of the Finnhorse under saddle, and with the growing popularity of riding and the support of SuoRa, Finnhorses of riding type gained a foothold, though by the late 1970s, even SuoRa estimated that only about 300 Finnhorses were being used for riding. However, the popularity of harness racing and the breeding of trotter type Finnhorses made the breed lighter and faster overall, which also benefitted the riding section. In addition, the Finnish state horse breeding institute of Ypäjä was founded in the 1970s, and was the first stud farm to breed and train Finnhorses for riding on a larger scale. Well-trained Finnhorse mounts from Ypäjä, seen in growing numbers in competition, added to the popularity and credibility of the breed for under-saddle use. After the slow beginning, the Finnhorse was increasingly appreciated as a riding horse. Today, over 5,000 are used for riding. Riding section horses currently are sought after while the trotting section suffers from oversupply.

=== Pony-sized type ===
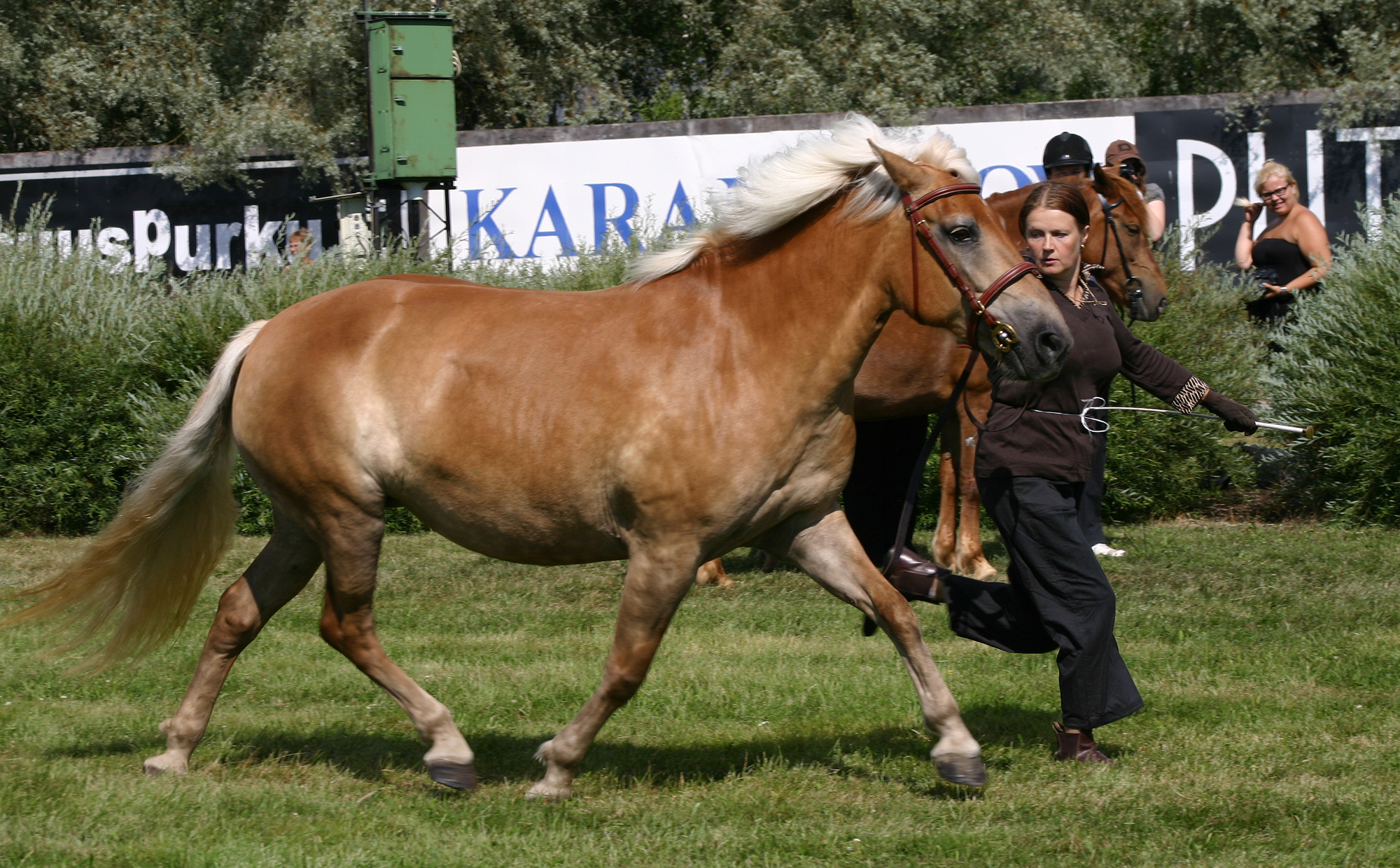
Despite its small size, the pony-sized Finnhorse is not a pony, and possesses the same body proportion and movement as the larger sections.

A pony-sized Finnhorse must measure no more than 148 cm (14.2-1/2 hands, 58-1/2 inches) at the withers or the croup. Both sexes are also required to pass either a drivability or a ridability test. The horse's pedigree is also evaluated, and uncharacteristically small individuals descending from larger-sized lines are not accepted. The horse should be proportionately small all over, and express all the qualities of a full-size Finnhorse. Especially thorough attention is paid to the pony-sized horse's character, obedience and cooperation. The pony-sized Finnhorse is suited to practically any use the larger Finnhorse is, with the exception of heavy draught work because of its smaller size and proportionally reduced strength. However, some individuals have been able to compete with and even win against full-size Finnhorses in work horse competitions. Many pony-sized individuals are cross-registered for trotter section breeding, as small Finnhorses can be equal competitors in harness against larger ones. In combined driving, the pony-sized Finnhorse's size is an advantage, allowing for greater agility. The section is popular for therapy and riding school use.

Although its breeding section was created at the same time as the trotter and riding types, the pony-sized Finnhorse is technically the newest of the sections, as trotters and riding horses were bred as "universal horses" in a combined section beginning in 1924. The Finnhorse had been bred for larger size for centuries, and when the pony-sized breeding section was established, few pony-sized lines existed. The section remains the rarest type of Finnhorse, with only about 80 stallions and 420 mares accepted in the studbook as of 2010.

== Studbook evaluation ==
To be registered as a Finnhorse, a horse must either have parents registered as Finnhorses, or be verified to be descended from at least three generations of Finnhorses. To qualify for the Finnhorse stud book as a breeding animal, a horse must prove itself by meeting or exceeding the breed standard set for various qualities: performance ability, conformation, disposition, and in some cases, quality of offspring. Any horse offered for the Finnhorse studbook must be at least 4 years old, a stallion or a mare, and registered a Finnhorse. The stud book evaluation board considers the performance of horses in their desired discipline: riding, driving, harness racing, or workhorse events. Horses to be registered in the stud book are tested for performance at the stud book registration inspection. With the exception of the trotter section, they are also evaluated on "type"; the suitability of the horse's overall build for the section for which it is offered. Individuals that do not qualify for the studbook on their own merits during the stud book evaluation process may be accepted later, based on the quality and accomplishments of their offspring. For this to occur, a horse's offspring are evaluated by their competitive history or their stud book evaluation, and if of high enough quality, their parent then is also granted acceptance into the stud book. Conversely, a horse may be removed from the studbook if its offspring are found to have any inherited flaw or condition. A stallion may also be removed if his offspring are clearly below the average level in competitive success or stud book evaluations.

=== Walking test ===
The walking test is given only to draught type Finnhorses and measures the horse's endurance while pulling a load. The horse tested pulls a 500 kilograms (79 st; 1,100 lb) load for 500 metres (550 yd), walking. The calculated time per kilometre must be no more than ten minutes to qualify as accepted. A horse qualifying with this time will be given four points. Extra points are given for faster times at the interval of 30 seconds, and the maximum points given is 10, for a time no longer than eight minutes and 30 seconds.

=== Pulling test ===
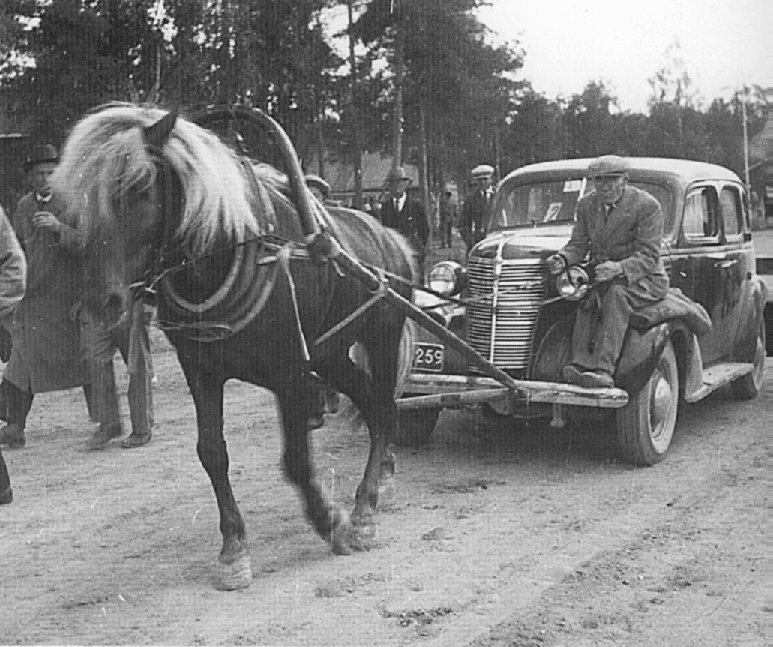
Finnhorse stallion performing in the pulling test with a measuring car. His breeder is allowed to sit on the car, an exception to the rules. Car pulling was part of stallions' studbook evaluation from 1936 to 1970.

The pulling, or tensile resistance, test is also a test only for the draught type horses, and it measures pulling capacity in relation to size. The test is performed in several progressive stages, called "steps", with the load increased each time. The horse tested will pull a weighed sled on semi-rough sand. The friction between the sled and the sand is taken into account and is measured before the test. The sled is loaded according to the horse's weight; on the first attempt, the load equals 36 percent of the estimated weight of the horse; with each subsequent stage of the test, the load is increased by 6 percent of the horse's weight. The horse must pull the sled for 10 metres (33 ft) at each weight. If the horse stops during a test and does not resume within one minute, or stops four times before reaching the required distance, the test is discontinued. Two points are awarded for every testing stage completed successfully, with a maximum total score of 20. The pulling style is also evaluated, and given 4 to 10 points. To pass the test, the horse must successfully complete pulls for at least five "steps". This corresponds to a pulling capacity of 60 percent of the horse's weight. An award of 20 points corresponds to 90 percent of the horse's weight being pulled.

=== Drivability test ===
The general drivability test is performed by trotter stallions. It is optional for draught type horses in lieu of the pulling test, and for pony-sized horses in lieu of the rideability test. The horse is driven by two different members of the studbook evaluation committee during this test, and asked to perform at a walk and trot. Its cooperation and disposition are evaluated on a scale of 4 to 10 points.

The draught section drivability test, which evaluates disposition: adaptability, reliability, and calmness, consists of four parts, and 0–5 points are given for each. To pass the test, the horse must score at least one point for each part of the test, and its combined score for the test must be at least 10 points. The first part examines the behaviour of the horse while it is being harnessed and loaded, then unloaded and unharnessed, and the remaining three parts evaluate the way the horse behaves when being driven. These parts often include regulation of the speed of the horse's walk, halts, turns around obstacles, and backing with a load around a corner.

=== Rideability test ===
In the rideability test, the horse is evaluated by a member of the studbook evaluation committee by being ridden at a walk, trot and canter. The horse's movement, balance and disposition are evaluated and given 4 to 10 points. The horse should express cooperation, gentleness, attentiveness, sensitivity to cues, and active effort. This test is required for riding-type horses, and optional for pony-sized horses in lieu of the driveability test.

== History ==
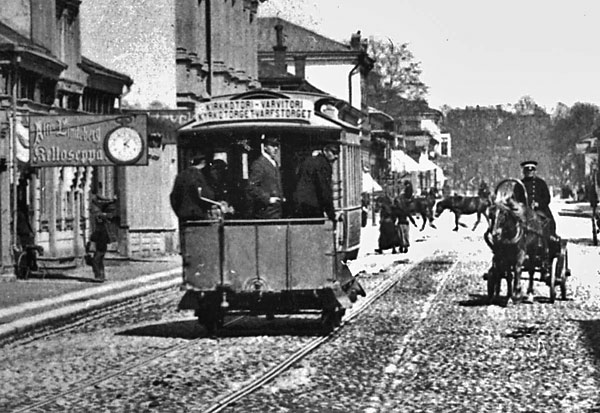
Finnish horses and a horse-drawn tram in Turku, 1890

The ancestors of the modern Finnhorse were important throughout Finnish history, used as work horses and beasts of burden in every aspect of life from antiquity well into the 20th century. The modern breed's precise line of descent is unclear, but numerous outside influences have been recorded throughout the history of Finland. Linguistic analysis suggest that horse was in use in Finland in the bronze age, but the earliest archaeological evidence of horses existing in what today is Finland dates to the Finnish Middle Iron Age (400–800 CE). The Finnhorse and its progenitors later became an indispensable asset for military forces from the region of Finland during the times of Swedish and Russian rule, and since independence as well. In addition to functionality as military and working horses, the Finnhorse has also been bred for speed in harness racing, and it can be argued that this sport was the main factor in the survival of the breed after its numbers crashed during the later half of the 20th century, from approximately 400,000 animals in the 1950s to 14,000 in the 1980s. In the 21st century, the numbers of the breed have stabilised at approximately 20,000 animals.

=== Early history ===
Although multiple hypotheses exist on the origins of the horse in Finland, an indigenous wild horse origin is thought improbable, as significant numbers of domesticated horses were imported from earliest times. The Finnhorse is most likely descended from a northern European domestic horse. One theory suggests that horses arrived from the west, brought to what today is western Finland by the Vikings during the Viking Age, circa 800–1050 CE. These Viking horses would have been of northern European ancestry. The other main theory suggests that non-Viking peoples, who migrated into Finland from the southeast and south, brought with them horses of Mongolian origin that had been further developed in the Urals and Volga River regions. Both theories have merit, as there were two distinct horse types in the eastern and western regions of Finland that remained distinct from one another until at least the middle of the 19th century.

The eastern origin of the breed was first proposed by archaeologist Johannes Reinhold Aspelin, who published Suomalaisen hevosen kotoperäisyydestä ("On the Nativity of the Finnish horse") in 1886–1887. Aspelin proposed that Finnish horses descended from an animal that had accompanied the migration of Finnic peoples from the Volga region and middle Russia to the shores of the Gulf of Finland. A similar idea was suggested over a hundred years earlier by natural historian Pehr Adrian Gadd, and this theory has continued to receive support into modern times. Ludvig Fabritius considered the proposed prototype a side branch of a "Tartarian" breed, and considered it possible that the same prototype also influenced Estonian, Swedish and Norwegian horse populations. A genetic study in 2014 concluded that closest relatives to the Finnhorse were the Estonian horse, Mezen horse, Yakutian horse and Mongolian horse.

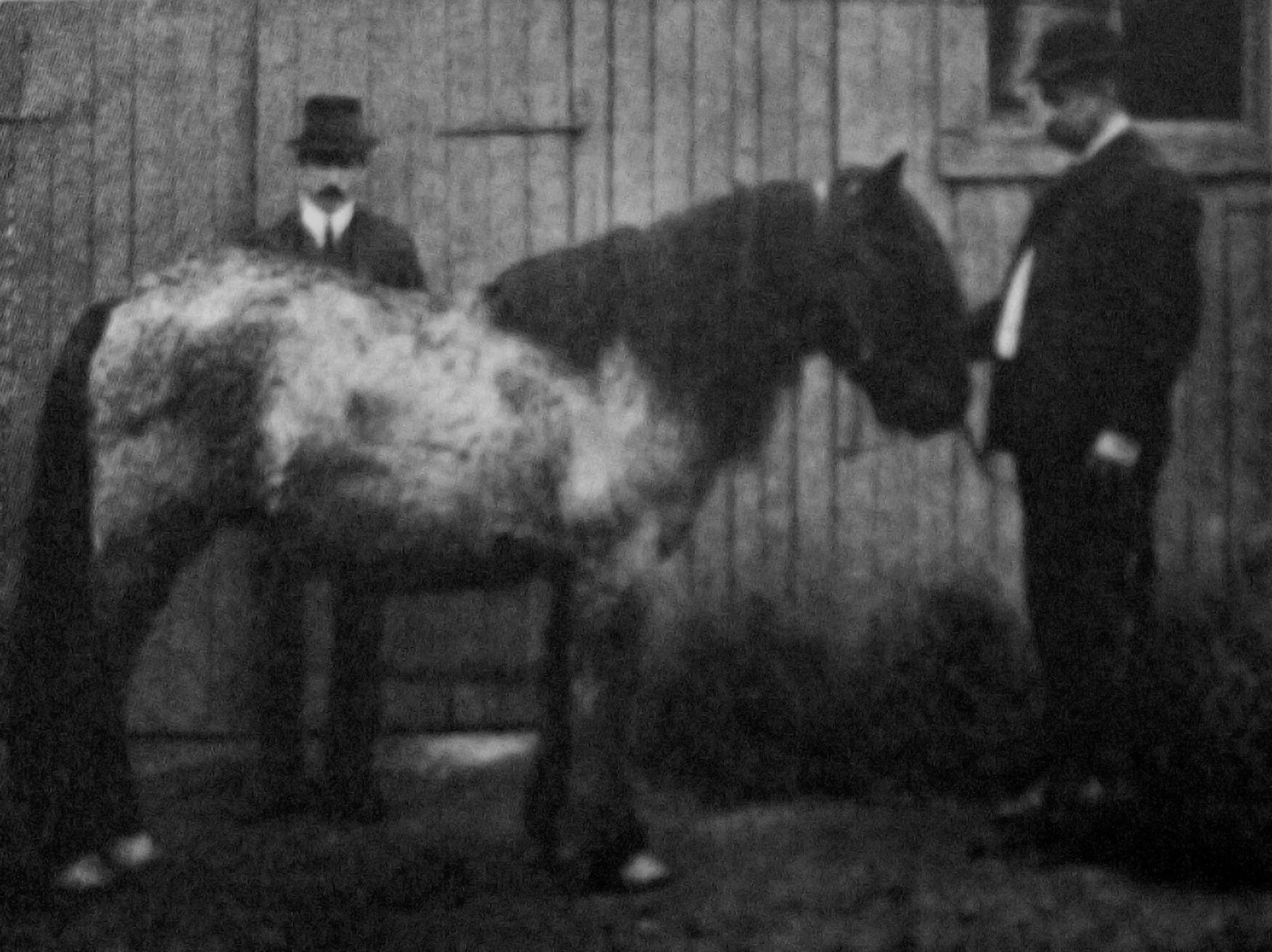
Contrasting early types: A small, stocky roan Finnish horse from Karelian Isthmus, photographed in 1909. 12.3 hands (51 inches, 130 cm) high.

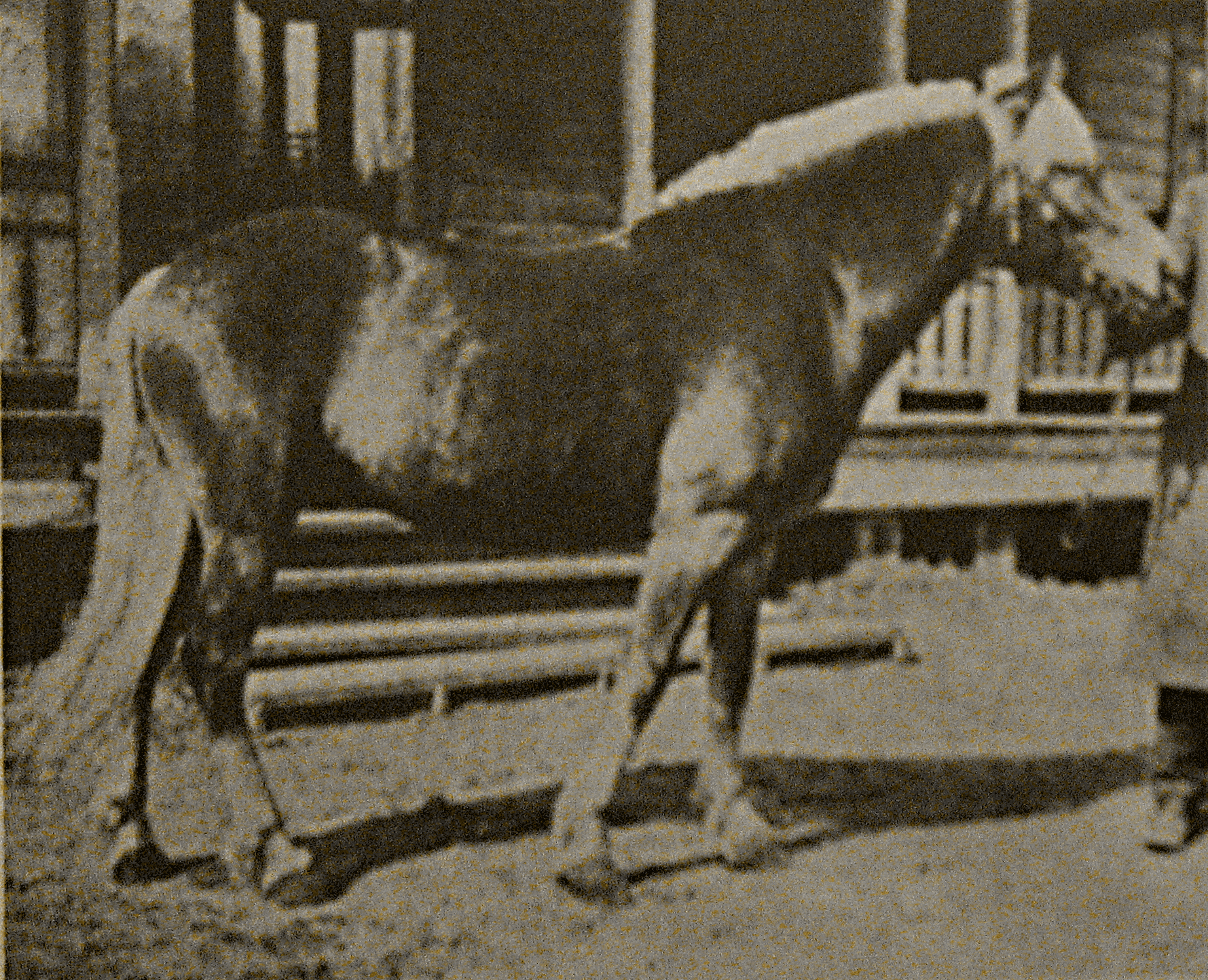
Contrasting early types: A more refined flaxen-maned chestnut Finnhorse from Central Finland, photographed in 1910. 14 hands (56 inches, 142 cm) high.

Later, agronomist Axel Alfthan (1862–1934) and veterinarian Kaarlo Gummerus (1840–1898) expanded Aspelin's hypothesis, proposing that the horse population later diverged into Eastern Finnish and Mid-Finnish types, which had remained distinguishable as late as the turn of the 20th century. Photographs support these claims: the small Karelian horse was blocky and stout, with pronounced withers, a short neck and large head. The small horse from central Finland, on the other hand, was "more noble", with a longer body, lighter neck and more refined head. The Swedish professor Eric Åkerblom even suggested that the Finnish horse spread along river valleys to Troms, Norway, and was the ancestor of the Nordlandshest/Lyngshest, found around the Lyngenfjord. The Norwegians continue to utilise Finnhorse bloodlines, having purchased the Finnish pony-type stallion Viri 632-72P for stud use in 1980. However, Åkerblom dismissed the possibility that the eastern Finnhorse came from same prototype as the western pony breeds.

In 1927, veterinarian and professor Veikko Rislakki (then Svanberg) proposed a different theory in his doctoral thesis. He argued that three types of wild horses existed in Europe, one of which he believed to be the Przewalski's Horse. Rislakki believed this unrefined and notably large-headed type was the horse the early Finns encountered about 1000 BCE. He suggested that the Finns later encountered other peoples and horses south of the Gulf of Finland, and that these peoples had better proportioned horses with a shorter muzzle and wider forehead, descended from the Tarpan. In addition, Rislakki suggested that the Finns came across European horses of Spanish and French origin during the first few centuries CE, larger in size and with narrow foreheads. Rislakki believed that his craniometric examinations, carried out in the 1920s, proved the influence of all these three horse types. Almost 20 years later, during the Continuation War, Rislakki also measured Karelian horses, and proposed they also came from an original Northern European animal descended from the Tarpan. Modern studies have discredited theories suggesting modern domesticated horse breeds descending from the Tarpan or the Przewalski's horse. The modern Konik horse resembles the extinct Tarpan however.

In the early 20th century, English J. C. Edward and Norwegian S. Petersen, proposed that Finland and the other countries surrounding the Gulf of Finland were the home region for the so-called "yellow pony". A later ethnologist, Kustaa Vilkuna (1902–1980) supported this view, proposing that an "Estonian-Finno-Karelian pony" descended from a small forest horse previously widespread in the lands surrounding the Gulf of Finland.

Earliest horse equipment (bits) found in Finnish graves date from the Finnish Middle Iron Age, beginning from circa 400 CE. Breeds considered to descend from the same early types as the Finnhorse include the Estonian Native horse, the Norwegian Nordlandshest/Lyngshest, the Swedish Gotland Russ, the Mezen horse from the region of Arkhangelsk, Russia, and the Lithuanian Žemaitukas.

At some point in their history, not clearly documented, horses bred in the western regions crossbred with horses that originated south of the Gulf of Finland. This made the western Finnish horse type larger and better suited to farming and forestry work. The characteristics of the original western Finnish type prevailed, however, even though influenced by outside blood and traces of outside influence could be detected for a long time. Later, this mixed type was further crossbred with larger horses from Central Europe during the Middle Ages. Foreign horses were also brought to Finland during military campaigns, and additional animals were imported to manor houses for driving. The crossbreed offspring of Central European and Finnish horses were larger than their Finnish parents, and even more suited for agricultural work.

The earliest known documentation of Finnish trade in horses, both as imports and exports, dates to 1299, when Pope Gregory IX sent a letter of reprimand to the merchants of Gotland, who were selling horses to the non-Christianized Finns. Apparently the Finns succeeded in improving their horse population, as the predominant form of Finnish trade in horses eventually shifted from imports to exports. A Russian chronicle from 1338 mentions "Tamma-Karjala" ("Karelia of the Mares"), presumably denoting a place of good horse breeding. As early as in 1347, King Magnus IV saw it necessary to put limits to the horse exports from Karelia to Russia.

Later, the 16th century writer Olaus Magnus mentioned the high quality of the horses used by the early Finns; in the 1520s, Gustav Vasa found the Finns exporting horses by the shipload to Lübeck, and strictly prohibited such trading, banning the sale of horses under the age of 7 years.

=== Organised breeding ===
The earliest document noting the importation of outside horses to Finland is a papal letter in 1229. During the Swedish rule of Finland that followed, foreign horses obtained by the Finnish cavalry, whether purchased for replenishment or seized as spoils of war, probably influenced the Finnish horse population. The first significant, planned efforts to improve the quality of horses through selective breeding in Finland occurred in the 16th century, when Gustav Vasa, known for his interest in horse breeding, founded mare manors (Finnish: tammakartano), stud farms, on his properties in Western Finland. He ordered the importation of larger horses from Central Europe, mainly from the region of Friesland. These horse were brought to Sweden and probably into Finland as well. The imports were kept at regional royal farms (Swedish: kungsgård, literally, "King's estate") to service local mares. In a letter from 1556, Gustav Vasa mentions that there were 231 breeding horses of this kind in Finland. It is not known whether these horses were imported directly from Central Europe to Finland, or descended from imports brought first to Sweden. Friesian stallions were used in Finland early in the 16th century to increase the size of the Finnish horse, and were employed for breeding in the royal farms up until the 1650s.

Gustav Vasa also carried out major reforms of his cavalry. After the decline of heavy cavalry in the Late Middle Ages, light cavalry was gaining importance, and with it a new approach to horse breeding. In 1550, he gave orders that "stud manors" (Finnish: siittolakartano) be founded on royal farms (Sw: kungsgård), not only in Sweden but also in every municipality of Finland. These studs were to each hold 20 mares and a smaller number of stallions, both Finnish horses and horses imported from Sweden. Gustav Vasa also imported mares from the lands bordering the North Sea; most likely of a Friesian type. His goal was to increase the size and weight of the Finnish horse population. His successor, Eric XIV prohibited the exporting of Finnish horses, which demonstrated the success of these efforts as well as the importance of the horses of the region of Finland. The horse breeding farms lasted only for about 100 years under later rulers of the Vasa line before the programs deteriorated. The last of the stud manors, that of Pori, was closed in 1651, and the crown-owned stallions and mares of the Pori stud were transported to Gotland.

Outside of these breeding efforts, Finnish horses were widely kept in semi-feral conditions through the mid-19th century. Ethnologist Kustaa Vilkuna describes how all horses regardless of sex and age were let out on forest pastures for the summer after the spring fieldwork was finished. The pasture was scarce and the terrain challenging, with both rocky ground and wetlands. Vilkuna considers this practice an important factor in making the Finnhorse an easy-keeping, hardy breed.

=== Military use ===
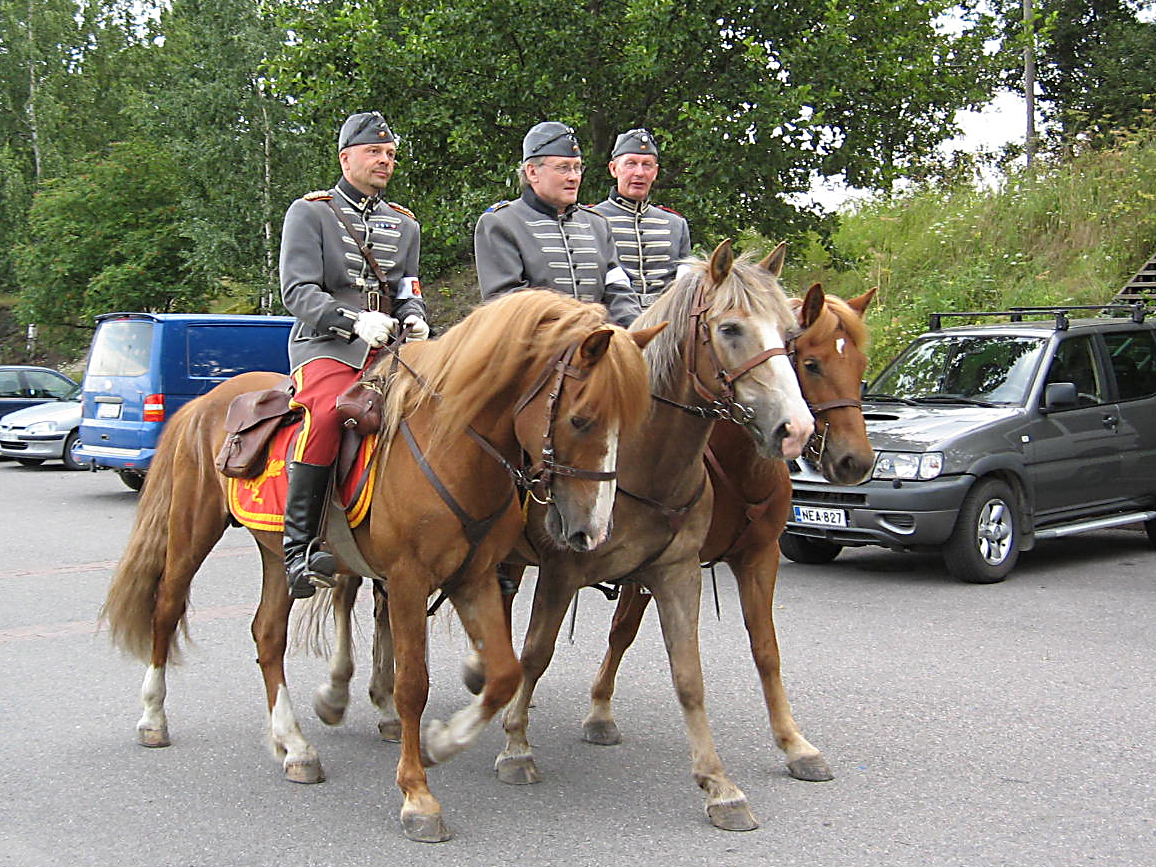
Historical re-enactment of early 20th century cavalry use of the Finnhorse. Model of uniforms is Finnish Cavalry m/22.

The goal of Gustav Vasa and others had been to increase the height of the Finnish horse. However, the Finnish cavalry survey records (katselmuspöytäkirjat) from the 1620s indicate this goal was not achieved. The heights of horses surveyed in 1623, measured not at the withers but at the highest point of the croup, which provides a height measurement significantly different from standard measures, ranged between 105 and 130 centimetres (41 and 51 in), the taller animals being the horses of officers. Only the horses owned by Colonel Herman Fleming were taller, with a croup measurement of 135 to 140 centimetres (53 to 55 in). It is not known if these horses were domestic crossbreeds or imported. The average height of the horses of the troops of Hollola, Pori and Raseborg was only 115 centimetres (45 in) one year, but those in the next year's survey were 125 centimetres (49 in). Overall, there were no pony-sized horses below a croup measurement of 110 centimetres (43 in), and the all-around average height of the horses used by the cavalry was about 120 centimetres (47 in).

During the Thirty Years' War in 1618–1648, the horses used by Finnish cavalry were small and unrepresentative, considered inferior even to the cargo horses used by the Swedish Royal Army. However, these animals had great stamina, a crucial quality during long, exhausting campaigns. The humble-looking Finnish horses were presumably exchanged when possible for other horses obtained as spoils of war. It was probably rare for a cavalryman to return with the same horse with which he left, and it is likely that the horses brought back to Finland were crossbreeds or of purely Central European lines. Reinforcements to replace the considerable horse casualties were obtained from the Baltic States, but during the reign of Charles XI almost all of the cavalry horses were imported from south of the Gulf of Finland, due to their larger size.

Before World War II, the Finnhorse was the breed that made up almost all of the horses that were part of the Finnish army and mounted police forces. While officers mostly rode various foreign light horse breeds, the so-called "light type" of Finnhorse was used for the enlisted members of the cavalry. Many of the most talented Finnhorses had competitive success during their service. After the war, the Finnish cavalry was converted to infantry, and the use of the Finnhorse for riding purposes nearly ended.

=== Crossbreeding ===
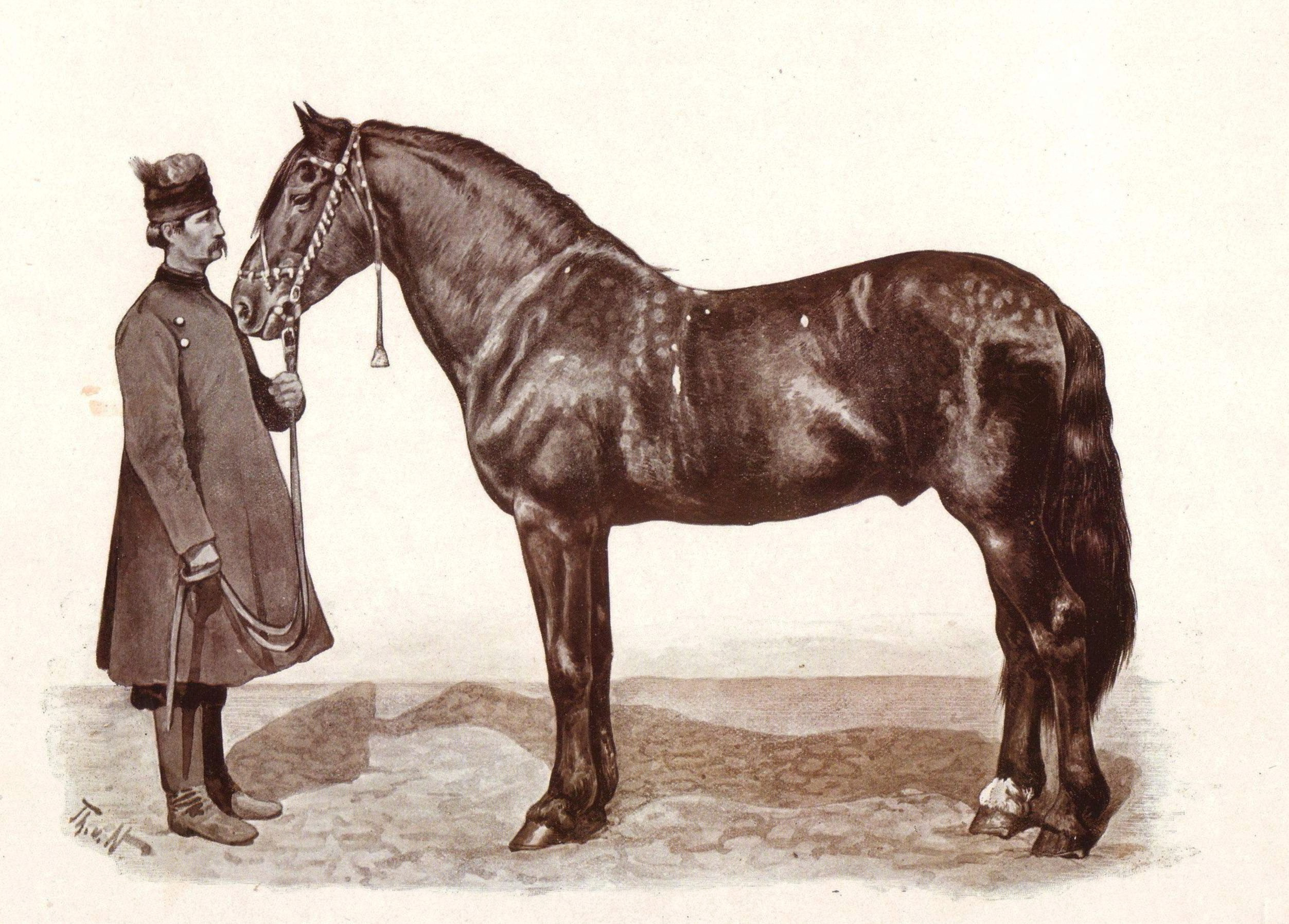
The Orlov trotter was one of the breeds widely used for crossbreeding the Finnish horse. Late 19th century drawing.

The Finnish horse had been intentionally crossbred from as early as the 16th century. Friesians and Oldenburgs were among the first known influences in the breed, having been used in the early 17th century to add size. Friesian horses were used systematically until the 1650s. During the 18th century, new warmblood breeds were created throughout Europe by crossing local native horse populations with light, hotblooded riding horses. Finnish military officers developed an interest in similar breeding while on study secondments (assignments) in foreign military forces. In 1781, Colonel Yrjö Maunu Sprengtporten founded a state stud farm in conjunction with the Haapaniemi military school. The stud had a few stallions described as "Arabian" and "Andalusian". For about 30 years, these stallions influenced the local horse population outside the military school as well, and a number of writings from the 19th century mention a "Haapaniemi breed". Similar if smaller crossbreeding programs developed elsewhere; at Tavinsalmen kartano, the royal estate (kungsgård) of Tavinsalmi, at least one of the mares had been imported from Sweden.

Russian Orlov trotters and Don horses also influenced the Finnhorse population in the first half the 19th century, improving its size, ridability and refinement. The horse type originating in Northern Savonia known as the "Fürstenbergian breed," bred by the engineer Fürstenberg at the beginning of the 19th century, was a crossbreed between the Finnish horses and Orlov trotters. The influence of Don horses was seen as late as in the 1920s and 1930s among the black and bay horses used by the Finnish cavalry – the dragoons of Nyland had two full squadrons of these colours.

In addition to the needs of the military, crossbreeding was used to improve the common working horse; improved roads and advances in agriculture had replaced the previously predominant oxen with the horse, and more horses of better quality were needed for transport and agricultural work. Attempts to create better working horses used many breeds, including Percherons and a heavy Norwegian breed; Ardennes horses were favoured in Southern Ostrobothnia and Southern Finland. In Southern Savonia a multitude of breeds were used. The amount and diversity of crossbreeding led to difficulties in creating a consistent type up until the beginning of the 20th century and the creation of the Finnhorse studbook; some of the first stallions accepted in the studbook were criticised for having a "Norwegian" look.

Other intentional crossbreeding experiments included the bloodstock of Sarkkila and Hali in Northern Karelia, descended from crosses with Russian military horses. The breeding programme of Sarkkila stated one of the stallions to be of "Fürstenbergian breed", and one of the mares of "oriental" descent. The "Hali breed", descending from the stallions of Sarkkila, was an important influence in the pedigree of a few notable Finnhorse trotter sires such as Eino 680 and his son Eino-Vakaa 25.

Some estates, especially in southern regions of Finland, were known to have used stallions of several light and hot-blooded breeds; for example, an officer in Pernå bred Arabians. These crossbreeds were probably an attempt to create showy driving horses. A notable failing of a crossbreeding attempt happened in 1875, when a stud was founded in Porvoo to import and export Norfolk Trotters, a breed that has had important influence in several driving horse breeds, including the Standardbred. The crossbred offspring were praised for their looks, but turned out to have poor temperaments and no talent for speed. Due to a combination of the large population of horses in Finland (over 200,000 animals) and the later enthusiasm for purebreeding, these estate-based crossbreeding attempts never had significant influence on the modern Finnish horse.

An especially detailed description of the best Finnish horses of the mid-19th century is available due to the development of the Tori horse in Estonia. Three experts were consulted about the Finnish horse in order to ascertain its value for the project. According to the stud farm inspector of the Russian Empire, Mayendorff, Finnish horses were found in four types: the "Haapaniemi type", the "Fürstenbergian type", an "Orlov type", and a "Karelian type". A Finnish academic master, A. Elving, considered Finnish horses most purebred in Karelia, and mixed elsewhere, especially in Southwest Finland, where Swedish, North-German and even English horses had been crossed with Finnish ones, while in Karelia and Savonia the outside influence had been mainly Russian. Swedish count Carl Gustav Wrangler, a respected hippologist of the time, mentioned in his report that Finns were then importing Norfolk Trotters for crossbreeding purposes.

Documents created some years after a number of Finnish horses had been imported to the Tori stud describe the Finnish mares obtained. Their average height was 14 hands (56 inches, 142 cm), and the colour was typically dark with a star. Their heads were large and necks short but well-carried; their bodies sturdy and proportionate with muscular withers, deep chest and muscular back; the loins were on the long side, and the haunches muscular if sloping. The leg joints were well-defined, the pasterns short and the feet tough. However, records also noted that the legs had "serious faults of position," not further defined. The Finnish horses also were considered calm and good workers, and swift walkers and runners.

=== Decline ===
In the 18th century, the horse population of Finland vastly diminished in both numbers and quality. At the beginning of the century, during the Great Northern War campaigns of Charles XII, the Finnish cavalry was larger than at any other time in history, and almost every usable horse of Finland was needed. Horses were used by the cavalry, infantry, and for transporting supplies. Horses serving in the Swedish military never returned to Finland; even the animals provided to the last remaining Swedish reinforcement regiments were taken to Sweden in 1714, and to Norway in 1718.

The Russian invasion and occupation caused additional hardships. By the end of Russian occupation in 1721, a third of the Finnish human populace as well as large numbers of horses were lost to war and epidemic diseases. Furthermore, a great number of horses were exported to Russia during the invasion at the command of Peter I. Horses removed from Finland ended up mainly in the area of Vyatka government, and some Russian researchers such as Simanov and Moerder have suggested that the Vyatka horse was developed mainly from Estonian and Finnish bloodlines. In addition to the hardships of war and occupation, the treaties of Nystad in 1721 and Åbo in 1743 ceded Finnish territory to Russia, which resulted in much of the Finnish horse population being left behind the new borders. The Finnish horses in these now-Russian areas were crossbred with the Russian horses in significant numbers.

With the Russians having taken the best animals, combined with the old custom of pastures shared by municipalities or larger areas, rebuilding the horse population took decades. To increase numbers, horses were often bred too young, and inbreeding also occurred. By 1761, one of the first researchers in the agricultural chemistry in Finland described the Finnish horse population of the time:

The Savonian-Karelian horse is its own breed, descended from [the horses of] Tartary. It is rarely taller than 9 korttelis [133 centimetres (52 in)], and it is of good conformation, and a good puller, chestnut or bay of coat. [The same breed is also found in Western Finland, where it is] mixed and bigger by the influence of Scanian horses.

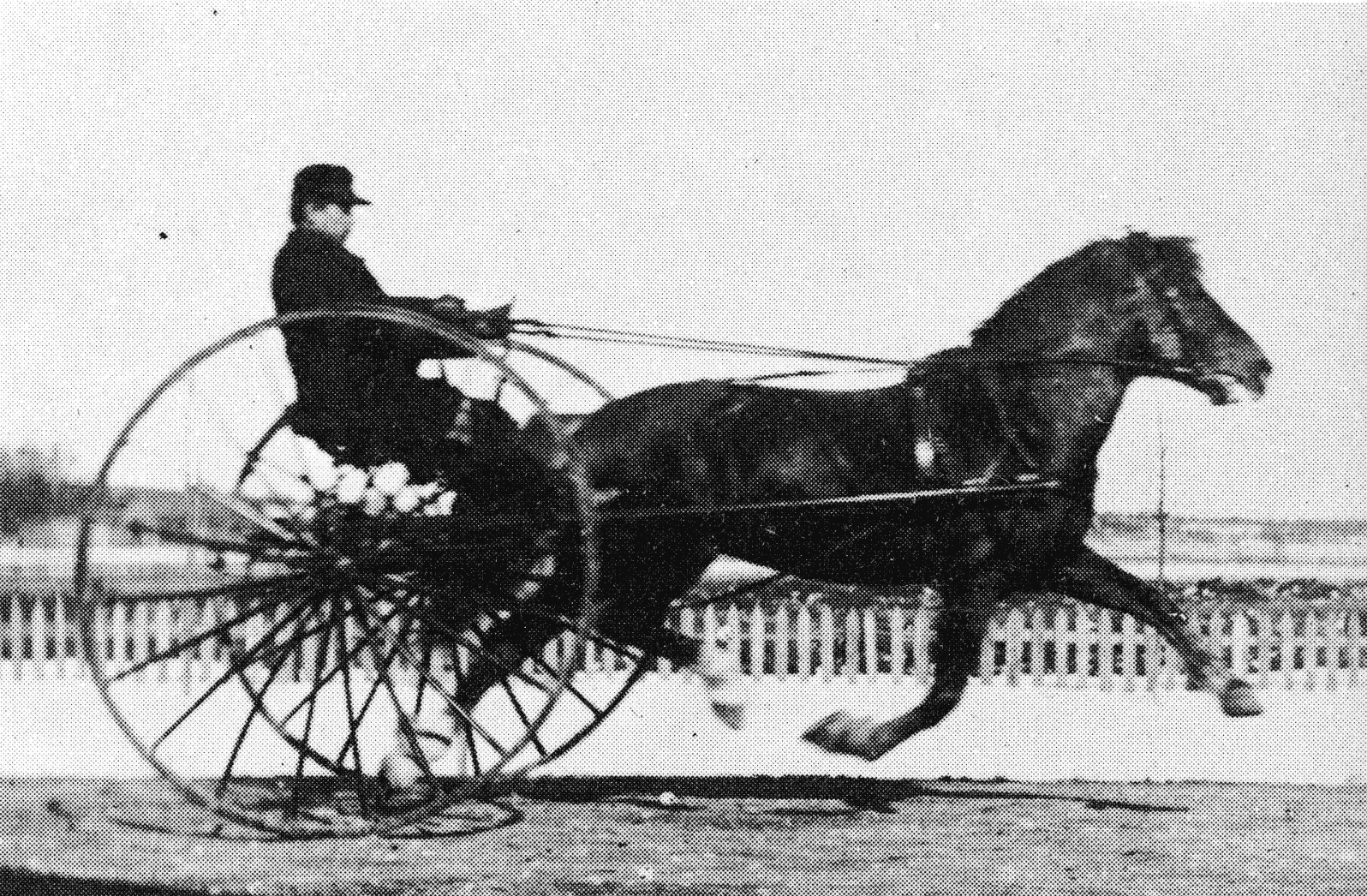
One of the Finnhorse founding sires, Kirppu tt 710, pulling an early sulky at full speed, c. 1890

According to ethnologist Kustaa Vilkuna's estimations, calculated from measurements of horse collars used in Finland in the early 18th century, the average peasant's horse was about 12.3 hands (51 inches, 130 cm) tall, while some horses employed by manors were larger, sometimes more than 13.3 hands (55 inches, 140 cm) tall. Vilkuna also discovered that the horses of the southern and western regions of Finland were larger than those of the northern and eastern regions. This was probably due to the influence of imported horses. By the mid-18th century, a typical Finnish horse was probably about 13.2 hands (54 inches, 137 cm), about the same size as a small contemporary Finnhorse yearling, and weighed about 300 kilograms (660 lb), roughly half the weight of a contemporary 15.2 hands (62 inches, 157 cm) working section horse. A civilian horse of good quality had good action and was swift. However, leg faults were common.

In response to the decline of the Finnish horse population and especially the great loss of good quality breeding animals experienced during the great famine of 1866–1868, the Senate of Finland gave orders for three provinces to obtain quality stallions for public use. The scope of the programme was later expanded to include eight provinces, and Finland was divided into breeding districts, which were all to have a state-owned stallion available to service local mares. The horses in this programme became known as "crown stallions" (Finnish: ruununori, ruununoriit). Official guidelines for the selection of stallions were never given, but one common aim throughout Finland was to increase the size and bulk of the horse population to create a type better suited for agricultural work.

=== Purebreeding and revival ===
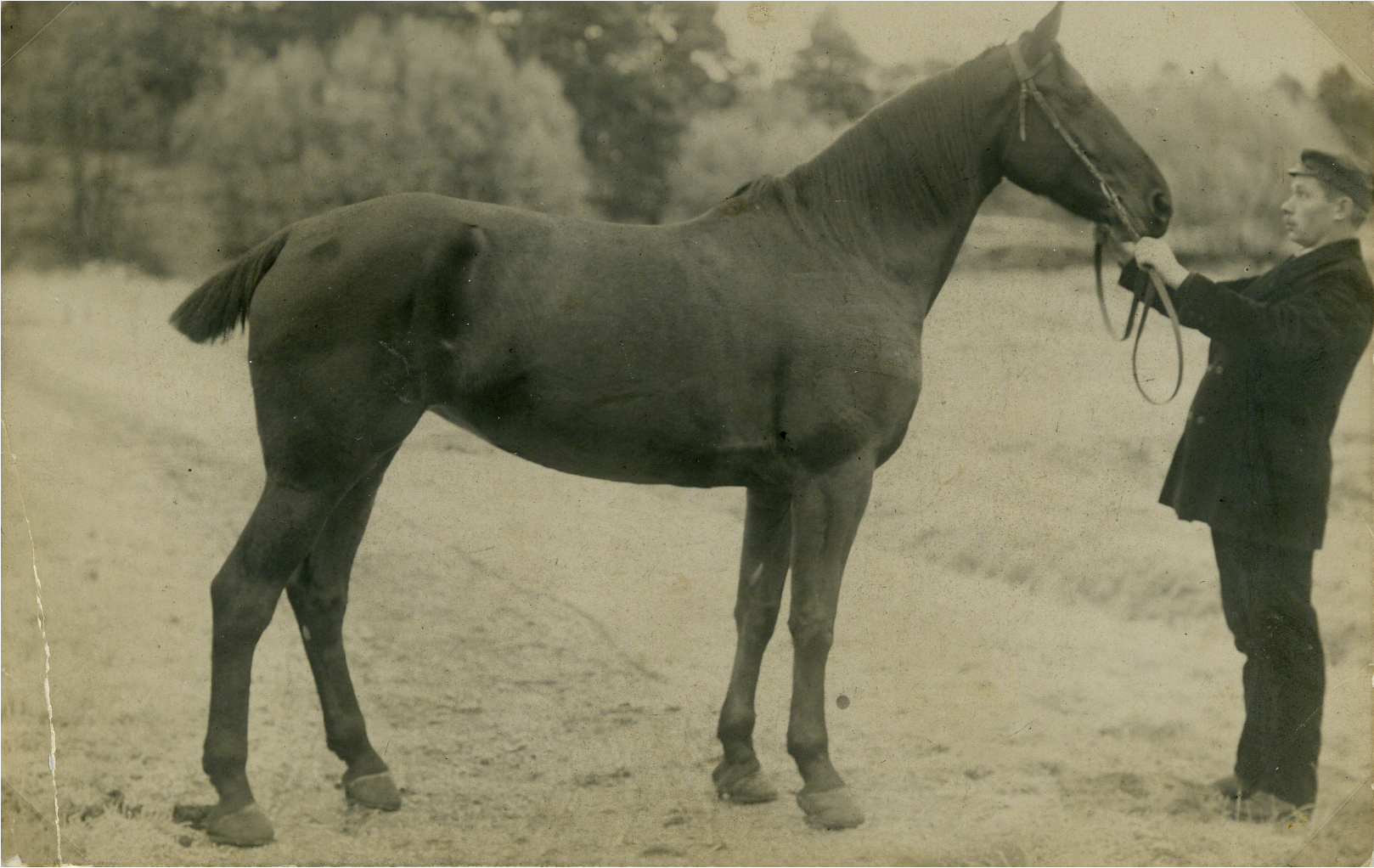
A late experiment of crossbreeding: an estate's carriage horse in the early 20th century, presumably of a Thoroughbred mix.

By the end of the 18th century, crossbreeding of Finnish horses began to be described, especially by military leaders, as "detrimental crossbreeding"—damaging to the quality of the Finnish horse, particularly for military use. In the beginning of the 19th century, German historian Friedrich Rühs especially blamed the west coast estates for damaging the Finnish horse by crossbreeding. Nonetheless, outside stallions were still imported to Finland. At the end of the century, stallions "of oriental, Arabian blood" still served at state farms. The influence of the Russian-imported "oriental" Turkish and Caucasian horses, as well as "Fürstenbergian" horses was also noted. Orlov Trotters were used in Savonia and Karelia, and Norwegian stallions were brought to northern Ostrobothnia. Light riding horses were imported from Russian and Central Europe. Conversely, heavier horses such as the Norfolk Trotter and Ardennes were imported to southern Finland as late as 1870.

As Finnish nationalism arose and increased in the late 19th and early 20th centuries, crossbreeding of the Finnish horse essentially ended and a new direction was taken by Finnish horse breeders. The breed was considered a symbol of the nation, and thus it was desired that it be as purebred as possible. On 20 November 1894, Finland's first horse breeding association Hevoskasvatusyhdistys Hippos (now Suomen Hippos) was founded to breed and improve the Finnish horse by the means of purebreeding, and in 1905, a governmental decree was issued for horse breeding associations to be founded throughout the country, leading to the establishment of the Finnhorse stud book in 1907.

At first the only notable objectives of the Finnhorse breeding programme concerned appearance, especially the colour, of the breed. The aim was to remove "foreign" characteristics. Later, in the 1920s, trials of performance were introduced, and since then, the main objectives of the Finnhorse breeding programme have continued to encourage improvements in the capacity, movement, conformation and character of the breed.

Since the establishment of the Finnhorse stud book it has been closed and the breed has been bred pure. While accidental and even intentional Finnhorse crossbreds exist, they are not accepted for the Finnhorse registry and have not been used to develop new breeds within Finland. The Finnhorse stud book remains in the control of Suomen Hippos.

=== Impact of World War II ===
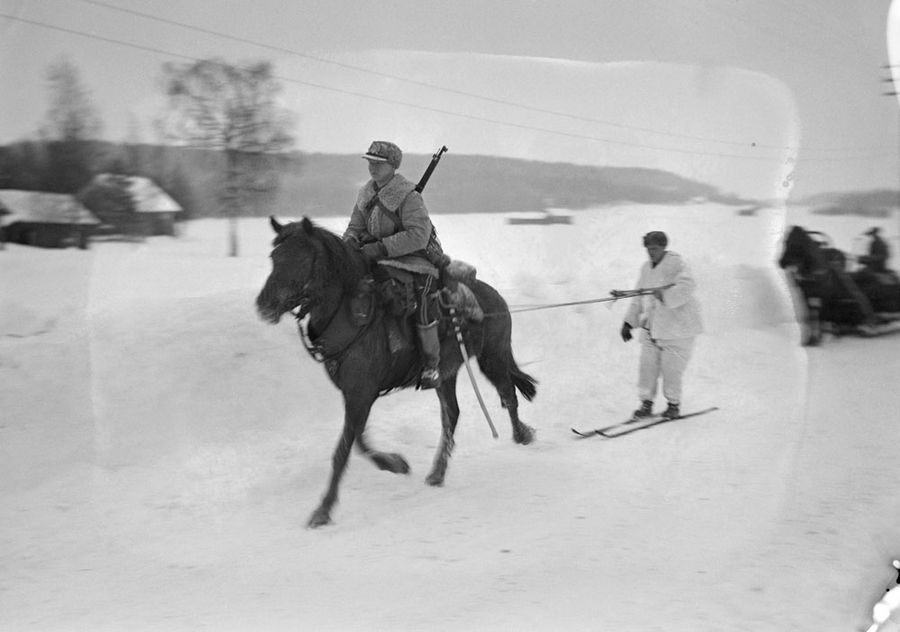
Horseman towing a ski messenger returning from the front

Horses were a central asset to Finnish military forces during the Winter War (1939–1940) and Continuation War (1941–1944), when tens of thousands of horses were the main locomotive power of the army due to the shortage of automobiles. Animals were procured from private owners in a systematic procedure, but to ensure the continuity of Finnhorse breeding, neither stallions nor any nursing, pregnant or studbook-approved mares were enrolled to be eligible for military procurement. All procured horses officially remained their private owners' property, were marked for identification and as necessary, were returned or reported dead. The program was successful in preserving the breed, as the horse population rebounded to its pre-war count of over 380,000 animals as soon as 1945.

The great number of Russian horses captured as matériel during wartime became a threat to the Finnhorse's purebreeding: many Russian animals were stallions, and there was no way to ensure new owners would not crossbreed them with Finnhorses. For practical and political reasons, Soviet Russia would not accept these horses back as a part of Finland's massive war indemnity. Finnhorses however, were accepted as payment, and a total of 18,000 animals were sold to Soviet Russia at low rates in 1947 and 1948. The best Finnhorses were not offered to the Soviets, however, and according to contemporary witnesses, many showy but otherwise useless horses ended up in Russia.

=== Post-war decline ===
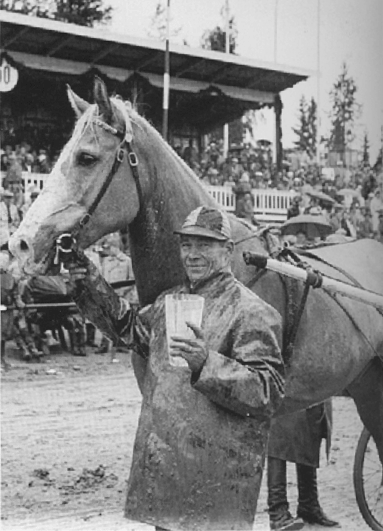
Gelding Reipas, first horse in Finland to earn over one million Marks, was one of the harness racing stars that became a popular hero during the hard decline of the Finnhorse.

Approximately 300,000 horses existed in Finland when the Finnhorse studbook was established in the beginning of the 20th century. The horse population, consisting almost entirely of Finnhorses, remained stable for 50 years. The rebuilding of the country after two wars had increased demand for horse power, and by the 1950s, the breed reached its all-time peak, with an estimated 409,000 animals, with a great majority of the horses being of the draught type. However, with the increased mechanisation of agriculture and forestry in the 1960s, the number of Finnhorses dropped precipitously. Horses, having been bred in large numbers only a few years earlier, were taken to slaughter by the thousands; a change in forestry tax policy made previously state-supported horse-powered forestry unprofitable and further discouraged keeping horses. Many working horse bloodlines ended, while lines more suitable for sports and recreation survived. By the 1970s, the breed's numbers had declined to 90,000 animals, and 10 years later as few as 20,000 Finnhorses existed. The breed's all-time lowest point was 1987, with only 14,100 horses. By this time, however, the overall horse population in Finland had been increasing for almost a decade, with lighter harness racing horse breeds establishing their position, counting 12,800 animals the same year.

Although other breeds were being increasingly imported and bred, the numbers of the Finnhorse population also slowly began to recover; in 1997, 19,000 Finnhorses existed. Harness racing and associated parimutuel betting, and to some degree also the relatively new hobby of riding, became the most important factors ensuring the survival of the breed.

=== 21st century ===
Nearly all Finnish horses foaled since 1971 have been registered. During the first decade of the 21st century, the breed's numbers in Finland stabilised at roughly 20,000, and approximately 1,000 foals are born annually. The breed makes up roughly one third of Finland's total horse population. The objective for ensuring the breed's continuity is to have at least 200 stallions and 2,000 mares used for breeding every year, 3,000 horses used for harness racing, and 6,000 horses for riding and other uses. In the 21st century, most Finnhorses are bred to be trotters, but the breed is also popular at riding schools and for recreational riding.

The Finnhorse is a relatively unknown horse breed outside of Finland, with no organised efforts to promote it internationally. The word "Finnhorse" was only recently coined, and only became the standard name after 1990. However, a few Finnhorses exist outside Finland, having been exported in small numbers to nations such as Germany and Sweden. As part of an equestrian exchange project carried out in the 1980s, a number of Finnhorses were sold to Austria and Germany in 1985 and 1987. In Germany, the horses were used as foundation bloodstock for the Freund stud, which went on to breed dozens of Finnhorses, selling them in Germany and Austria. A number of horses were also exported to the Netherlands. The German Finnhorse population remains the most notable one outside Finland, with 150 animals.

Apart from the exchange project of the late 1980s, activity to export the Finnhorse has been minimal. However, a 2008 study stated that increased international interest and demand for the Finnhorse was advisable to ensure the survival of the breed. To this end, the objectives of the national breeding program, as of 2008, include increasing international recognition of the Finnhorse and generating demand for the breed for recreation and lower-level equestrian education; to make it the standard breed used in Finland for equestrian tourism; and to improve the opportunities for Finnhorse trotters to participate in Swedish and Norwegian heats.

Within Finland, the Finnhorse is valued as the national horse breed with cultural ties and strong support from a variety of Finnhorse organisations. On the other hand, progress in popularizing the breed internationally is complicated by its low population and lack of international recognition. The strengths of the breed in international disciplines are considered to be its good health and working qualities, its versatility, and its novelty value outside of Finland. The versatility of the breed's "universal" horse type, a Finnish concept, has plusses and minuses: It creates a challenge in marketing because buyers tend to seek conventional horse types, and as a result it lacks a strong advantage over specialized breeds. Yet, the versatility of the Finnhorse can also be an advantage; more specialised breeds may be limited to a smaller range of activities.

== Influence on other horse breeds ==
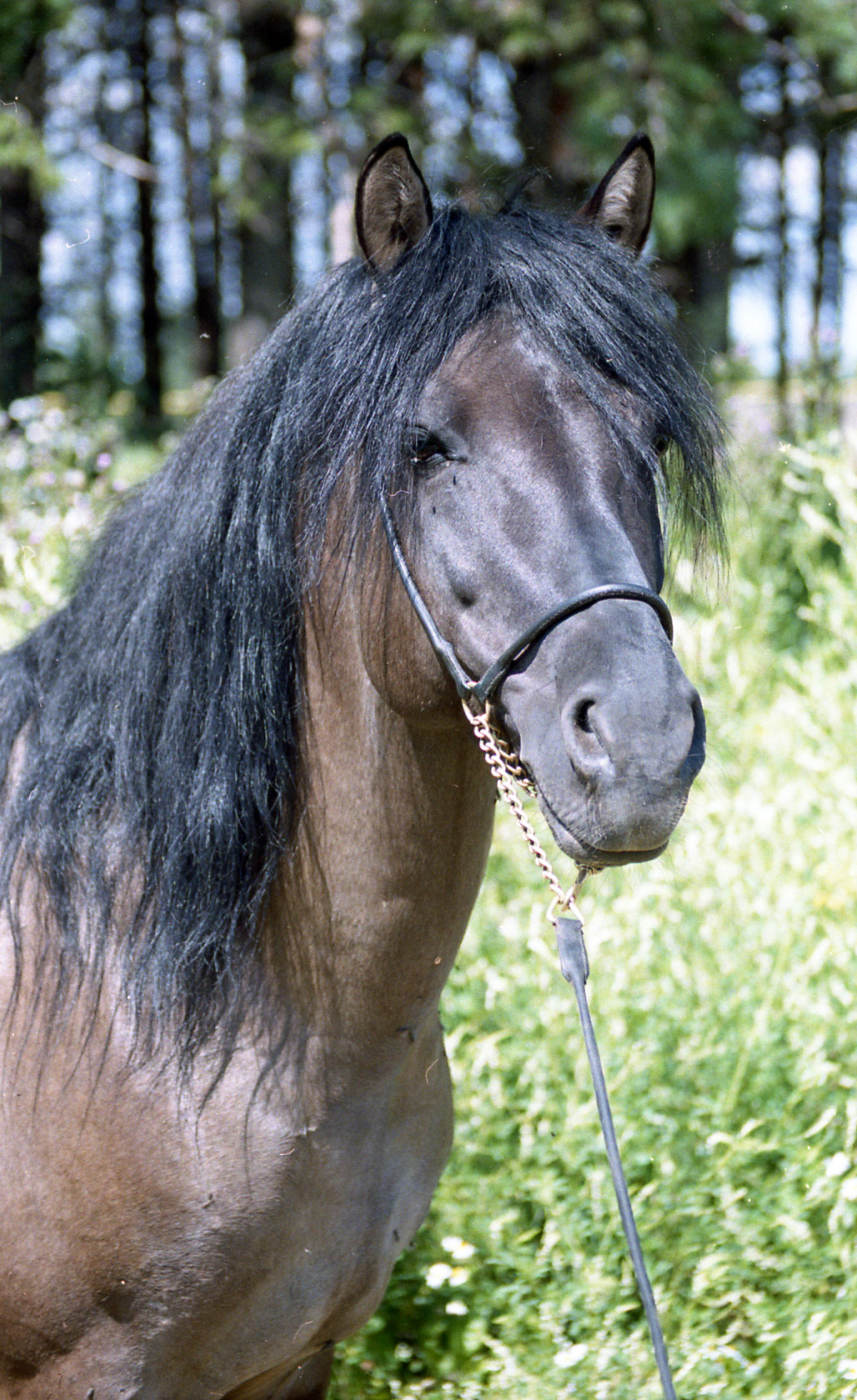
A Vyatka horse exhibiting an overall expression similar to the Finnhorse

From the 14th to the 16th century, Finnish horses were exported to Russian and Germany in such quantities that eventually restrictions on exports were set. The Finnish horses exported to Russia in early 19th century influenced the development of the Vyatka horse. In the 19th century and early 20th century, horses of Finnish origin were used in creating many Baltic and Russian agricultural draught breeds, such as the Tori and the Lithuanian Draught. In most cases, these breeds were developed by crossbreeding Finnish horses on small local horses, thus increasing size. In the 1920s and 1930s, the Finnhorse was also used in the breeding of the Estonian horse. The heavy Mezen horse was bred with both the Finnhorse and the Estonian Horse, until its stud book was closed in the 1950s. Traces of Finnhorse influence is found in other Soviet and Russian work horse breeds. In the mid-20th century, Finland exported 15,000 horses to Soviet Russia as part of its war indemnity. In the 1960s and 1970s, pony-sized Finnhorses were also used to improve quality and broaden the gene pool of the Norwegian Nordlandshest, which had become highly inbred by the 1960s.

=== Tori horse ===
In the mid-19th century, manor owners in Estonia found the native Estonian Horse too small for their agricultural needs, and concluded that the population would benefit from crossbreeding. Finnish horses were among the breeds considered for the job. The state stud farm of Tori was founded as the central base for the new Estonian breed in 1856, and ten Finnish mares and three stallions were bought for its needs. Though some purebred Finnish horses were produced, they were used mainly for crossbreeding; the later offspring of part-Finnish crossbreds did not prove as good as expected, and the Tori stud gradually stopped using Finnish horses. One Finnish-Arabian stallion, Orro, has had noteworthy influence on the modern-day Tori horse, through his widely used great-grandson Harun 42 T.

== Uses ==
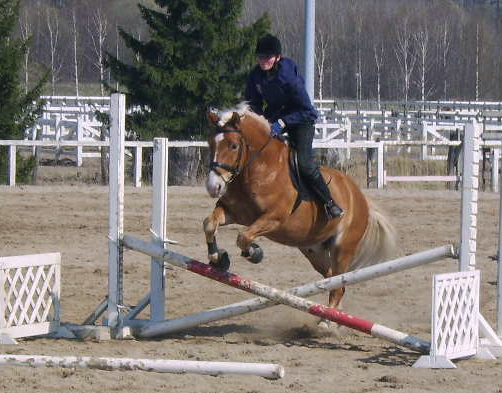
Jumping a basic cross-rail

Approximately 75 percent of Finnhorses are used at some point in their lives for harness racing, with riding being the second most popular use. Many Finnhorses have multiple uses, such as starting their career in harness racing and later moving on to riding. Finnhorses perform both at their own competitions and in open, all-breed classes in dressage, show jumping, and eventing. They are also used for endurance riding, western riding and combined driving. Approximately 1,000 Finnhorses are used in riding schools and in riding therapy, as they are usually easy going and pleasant to ride. They are also popular as pleasure horses.

=== Draft work ===
Agricultural and forestry work were the traditional uses of the Finnhorse. The Finnhorse was never bred to be a particularly large or heavy draught horse, as it was the only horse breed of the country, and versatility was desired as the Finnhorse was also used as the primary steed of the cavalry. The climate and conditions of Finland necessitated that the breed be durable and hardy. As a result, the Finnhorse remained small but tough, and could pull heavy loads in difficult terrain and even in chest-deep snow. Relative to its size, the Finnhorse is among the most powerful workhorses in the world with the best animals able to pull as much as 200 percent of their own weight.

There are few draft-type Finnhorse family lines left, and only an estimated two or three hundred animals are known to still be used as actual workhorses. However, interest in traditional uses and methods has been increasing, and workhorse competitions are regularly held which usually include horse pulling or ploughing contests.

=== Harness ===
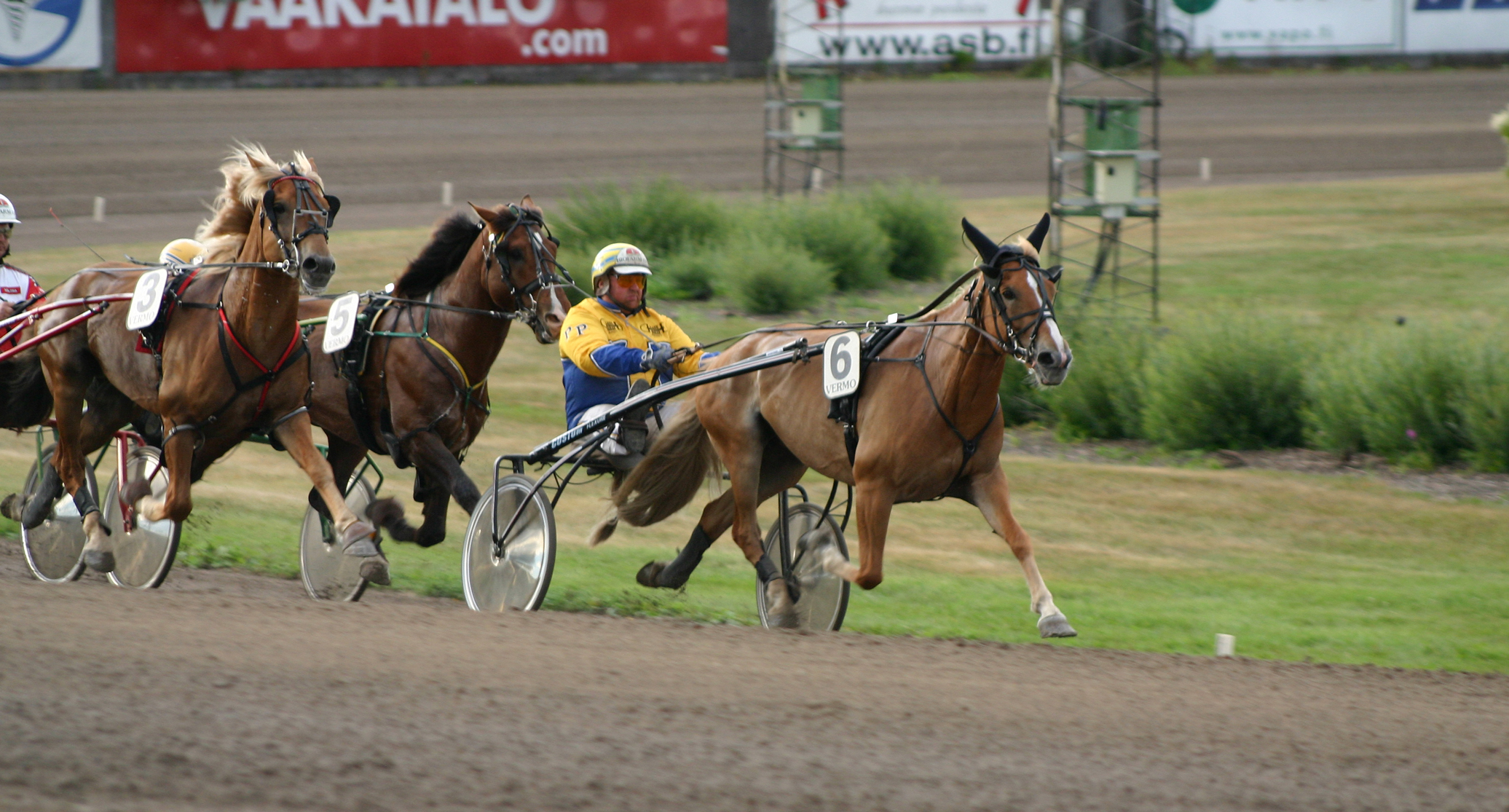
Harness racing has been the main use of the Finnhorse since the 1960s. In the lead is two-time winner of the Ravikuningatar title, I.P. Vipotiina, during her August 2010 Finnish record run.

Finnhorses have historically been used for harness racing, with organised harness races having been held since 1817. Prior to that, racing from church to home had been a traditional recreation among farmers, and harness racing remained a farmer's hobby to the end of the 1950s. By that time, the number of horses kept in Finland was plummeting and racing lost popularity. After 1959 the Finnhorse was no longer the only horse breed that was allowed to race in Finland; the importing of faster, light trotter breeds and the introduction of Parimutuel betting brought professionalism and new life to the harness racing sport. Increased interest in betting led to growth in racing, which in turn helped establish harness racing as the main use for the Finnhorse during the next decades.

Finnhorses also successfully compete in combined driving, and are the breed most often used for the sport in Finland, especially at regional and national levels; the Finnhorse Jehun Viima, driven by Heidi Sinda, was a member of the Finnish singles driving team that finished second at the 2002 World Singles Championships in Conty, France. According to Sinda, the Finnhorse is ideally suited for combined driving, being well-mannered, focused, hard working, obedient, and possessing "cool nerves."

=== Riding ===
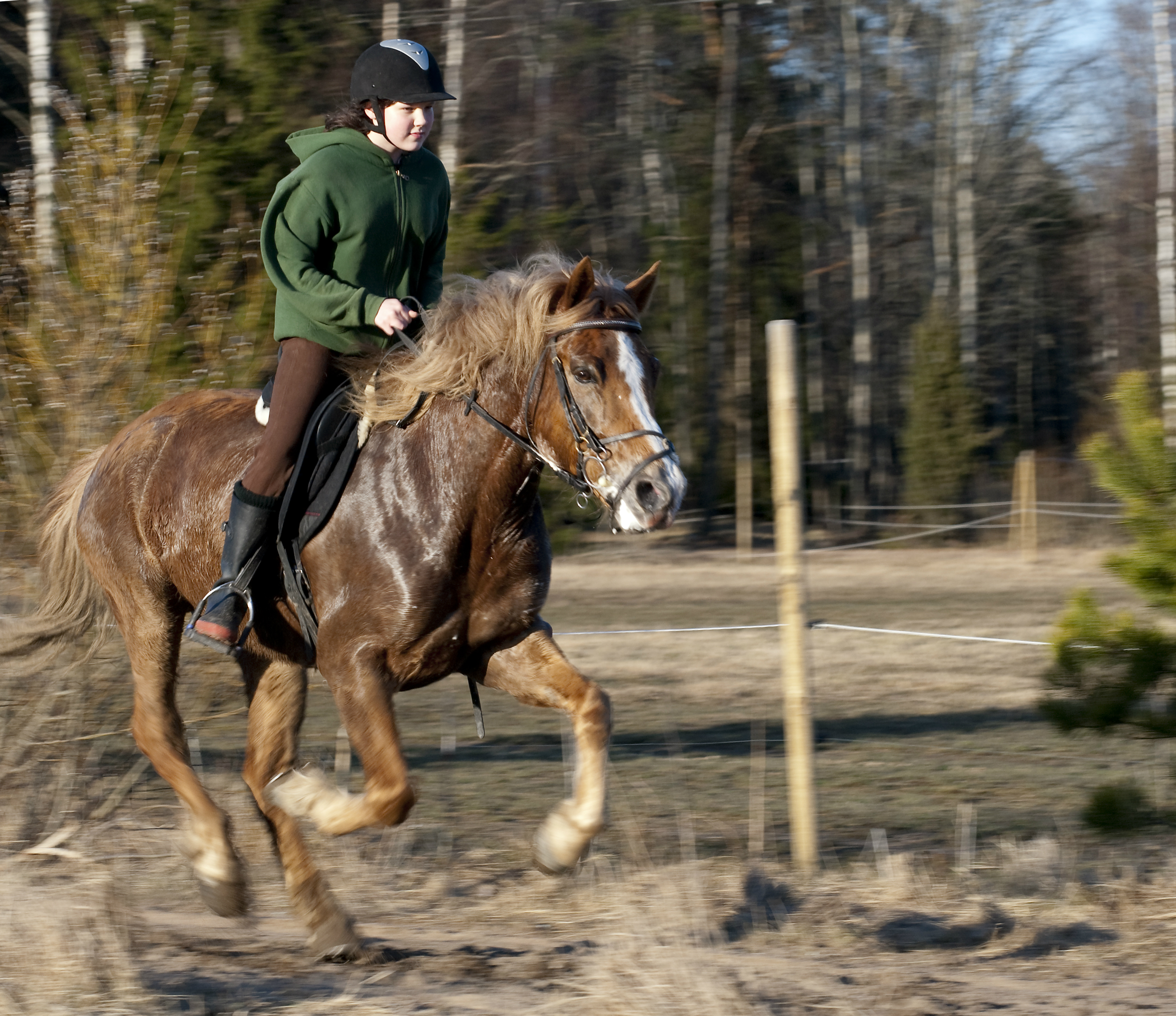
The Finnhorse's popularity as a breed for recreational riding in Finland has been increasing since the late 20th century.

Finnhorses are popular as recreational riding horses, and well-suited for use at riding schools, trekking, and riding therapy. Of the ten horses employed by the mounted police of Helsinki as of 2007, two are Finnhorses, though they are considered small for the job. They are also competitive in many disciplines, and in the 1970s separate competition classes for Finnhorses were established at horse shows, which helped to increase the popularity of the breed. While in eventing and horse racing, Finnhorses are too slow to compete directly against Thoroughbreds and the sport horse breeds, they are a highly reliable mount for cross-country riding, particularly over difficult terrain; during the Continuation War, the breed successfully crossed any wetland with which it was confronted. In endurance riding. Uusi-Helinä, ridden by Ritva Lampinen, successfully finished the endurance riding world championship competition in Stockholm, Sweden in 1990, finishing 28th.

The Finnhorse is considered a reliable and fairly good jumper, and is regularly seen in 130 centimetres (51 in) show jumping classes. Finnhorses have been quite successful at lower levels because they are clean and efficient jumpers, but their shorter stride at the canter and gallop keeps them from competing at more advanced levels. Olympic rider Werner Walldén described the Finnhorse as enduring and resilient, mentally focused, and an easy keeper. He considered jumping to be the breed's best asset as a riding animal, but noted that its scope does not reach the level required for modern international competition.

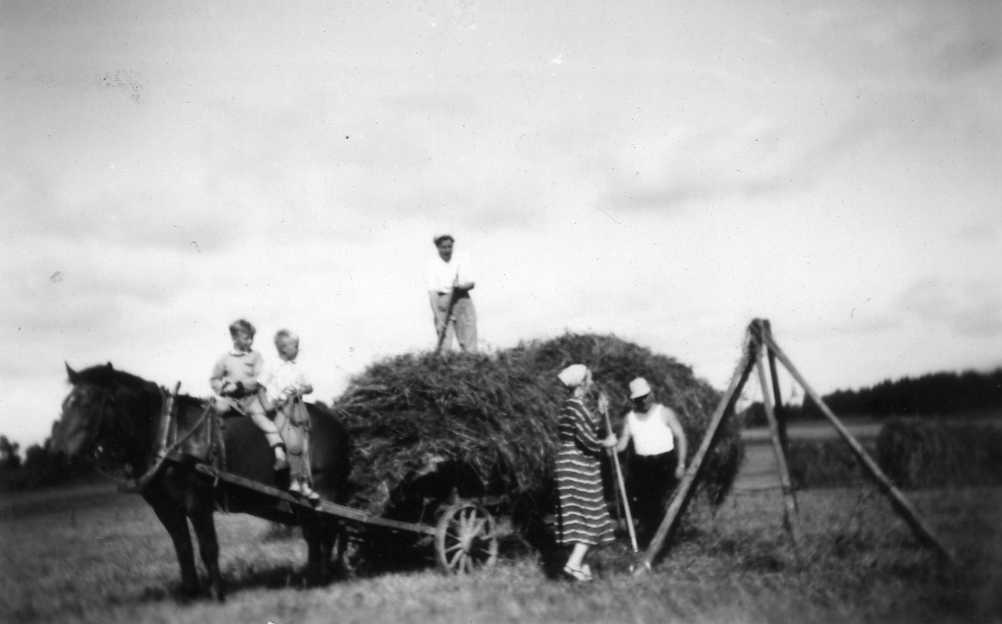
A Finnish family making hay in 1954. The Finnhorse's mild nature makes the breed a valuable companion in agricultural work as well as a therapy mount.

In dressage, the Finnhorse is able to compete with warmbloods up to national levels, and in lower levels it has the advantage because it can easily perform the required movements, and has smoother gaits that allow for ease of riding. In 2010, a Finnhorse medaled in international paraequestrian dressage competition. In higher-level dressage, the breed is hindered by its less-flashy movement, restricted by a somewhat upright shoulder. Despite this there are successful dressage horses, and a number of Finnhorses even earn their keep with their dressage winnings, a notable achievement as competing in Finland is expensive and prize money low. Most Finnhorses used in dressage compete at the national 4th level (US) or Grade IV (GB), though some individuals have competed at the Prix de St. Georges level.

The Finnhorse is also well-suited to riding therapy, being calm, hard-working, and obedient. They are small enough to allow the patient to be assisted easily, yet large enough to have gaits that stimulate the muscles and balance of the rider. Many Finnhorses have also been trained for driving, and therefore are familiar with unusual noises and can be controlled from behind, and ex-trotters are inexpensive. Many Finns also find the appearance of the Finnhorse comforting.
