= Varpaisjärvi =

- Former municipality
- Varpaisjärven kunta Varpaisjärvi kommun
- Coat of arms

- Location of Varpaisjärvi in Finland
- Coordinates: 63°21.5′N 027°45.5′E
- Country: Finland
- Region: North Savo
- Sub-region: Upper Savo sub-region
- Charter: 1911
- Consolidated: 2011

Government
  - Municipal manager: Heikki Airaksinen

Area
  - Total: 533.20 km^{2} (205.87 sq mi)
  - Land: 483.02 km^{2} (186.50 sq mi)
  - Water: 50.18 km^{2} (19.37 sq mi)
- Elevation: 109 m (358 ft)

Population (2010-10-31)
  - Total: 2,899
  - Density: 6.002/km^{2} (15.54/sq mi)

Population by native language
  - Finnish: 98.9% (official)
  - Swedish: 0.2%
  - Others: 0.9%
- Time zone: UTC+2 (EET)
  - Summer (DST): UTC+3 (EEST)
- Website: www.varpaisjarvi.fi

Varpaisjärvi is a former municipality of Finland. It was consolidated with the municipality of Lapinlahti on January 1, 2011.

The municipality was located in the North Savo region in the former province of Eastern Finland. It had a population of 2,899 (31 October 2010) and covered a land area of 483.02 square kilometres (186.50 sq mi). The population density was 6.00 inhabitants per square kilometre (15.5/sq mi).

The municipality was unilingually Finnish.
