= Kuninkuusravit =

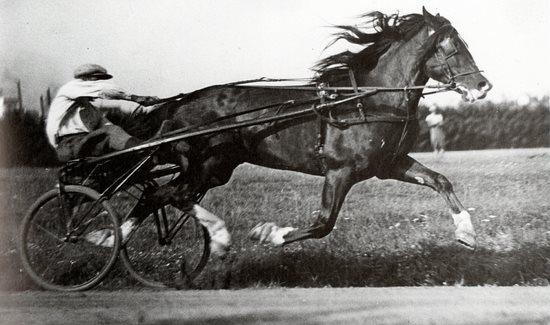
- Stallion Eri-Aaroni running in the 1939 race, Turku
- Location: Finland
- Inaugurated: 1924
- Race type: Harness race for Finnhorse mares and stallions
- Website: kuninkuusravit.fi (in Finnish)

Race information
- Distance: 2,100 m (1.305 mi); 1,609 m (1.000 mi); 3,100 m (1.926 mi)
- Track: Left-handed 1,000-metre (0.621 mi) track
- Qualification: Finnhorse stallion or mare, registered in the Finnhorse studbook. At least 4 years old.

The Kuninkuusravit ("royal races") championship is an annual harness racing championship contest in Finland. It is the official Finnish national championship contest for Finnhorse stallions and mares. It has been held annually since 1924, except during 1934–1937 and the war years 1940–1942 and 1944. Originally stallions and mares competed together for the title of Ravikuningas ("Racing King"), but in 1948 a separate title, Ravikuningatar ("Racing Queen"), was established for mares. Geldings may not participate.

The Kuninkuusravit championship races take two days, with three starts run each day. The first start, 2.100 kilometers (1.30 mi), is run on the first day, and the 1.609 kilometers (1.00 mi) and 3.100 kilometers (1.93 mi) starts on the second day. The stallion and mare with the best combined times from all three starts win. Thus, to win the title, a horse does not necessarily need to win a single run, and for instance, in 2006, the stallion Saran Salama won the championship after placing 2nd, 2nd and 3rd in the respective starts. Both divisions include 12 animals. Horses taking part in the contest must be registered in the Finnhorse studbook.

Suomen Hippos organizes the Kuninkuusravit contest annually, in co-operation with one of its affiliated organisations. The contest is held in July or August. The first eight Kuninkuusravi contests were held in Lahti, but since 1931, the principle has been to hold the contest in a different place every year, all around Finland.

== History ==
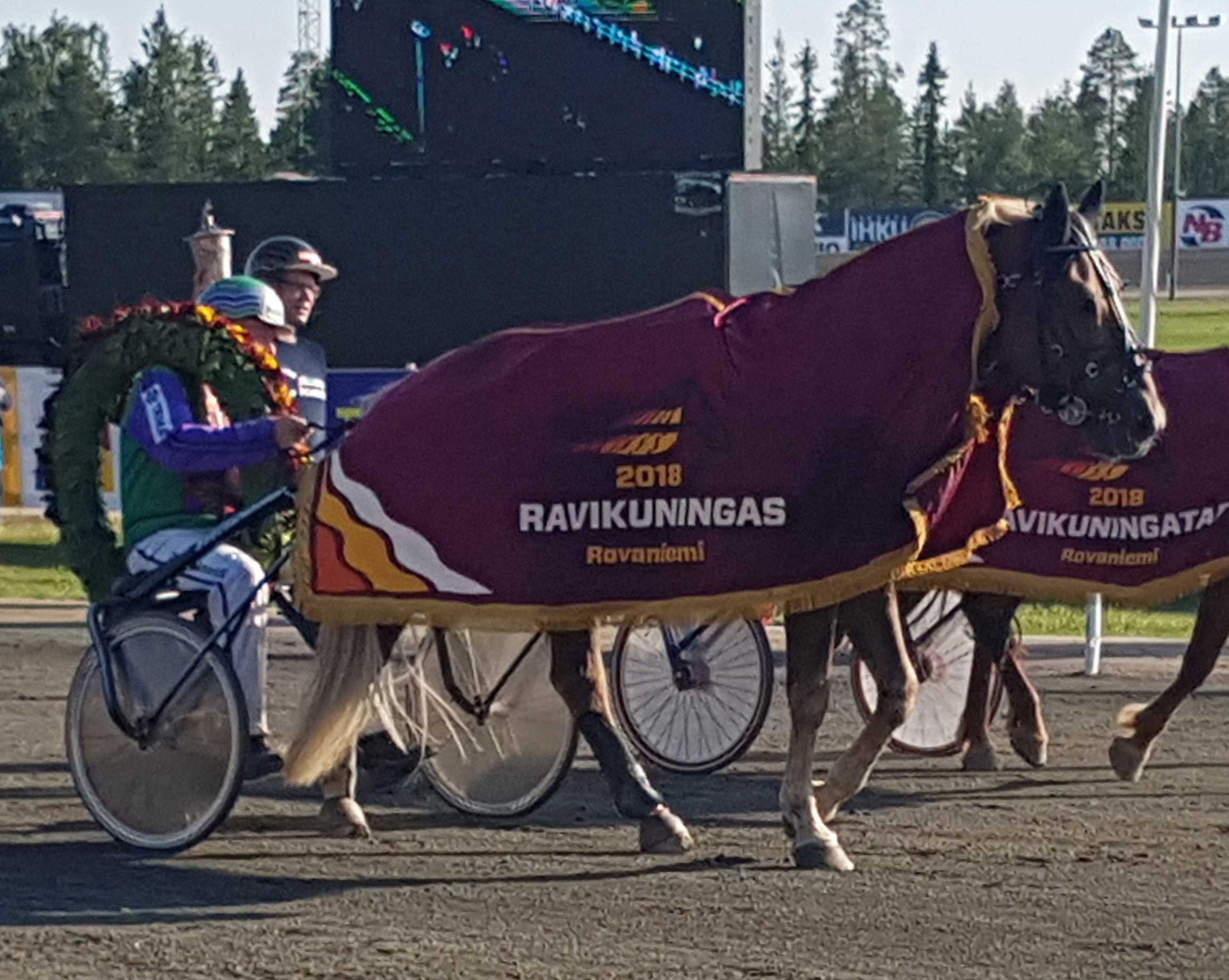
2018 Kuninkuusravi Winner "Costello" in Rovaniemi

Finnhorse Costello. Before the foundation of Kuninkuusravit in 1924, the annual Finnish Finnhorse harness racing championships had been run as state-held races, valtionajot ("state races"). Some single races had been called "kuninkuusajot" before 1924, for instance in Tampere on September 28, 1913, but the race was probably at provincial rather than national level. Similar contests were held also in Southern Ostrobothnia.

The Kuninkuusravit contest replaced the state races as the official national harness racing championship contest for Finnhorses. The state races, however, were still held until 1939. The first Kuninkuusravit contest was held in Lahti in 1924, and it consisted of three starts: 1.609 kilometers (1.000 mi), 2.000 kilometers (1.24 mi) and 3.000 kilometers (1.86 mi). At first the starts were run one horse at a time, but it was later changed so that the starts are run normally, all horses at the same time.

During the war years of 1940–1946, the Finnish harness racing sport was in depression: only few horses were trained, and races were held rarely as most of the horses and men were serving in the military forces. The Kuninkuusravit contest was held only three times, in 1943, 1945 and 1946.

Until 1948, the title of Ravikuningas was open for both stallions and mares, which competed in the same division. The title was won by mares five times: in 1925, by Reippaan-Liisu, and in 1930–1933 by Tomu.

In 1948, the contest was split in two divisions, for stallions and for mares, but the rules allowed a mare to take the Ravikuningas title in case her combined time was better than that of the best stallion. By the 1948 rules, a mare only won the Ravikuningas title once (Suhina in 1956). The rule that allowed a mare to "overtake" the Ravikuningas title was later abolished.

== Multiple winners ==
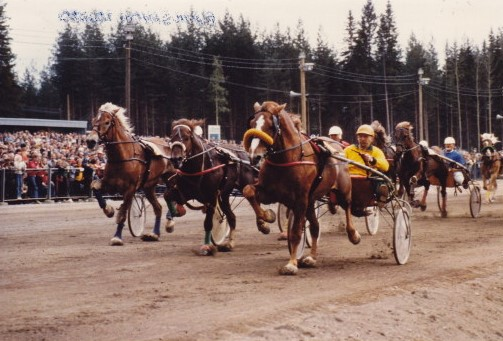
Finnhorse stallion Vieteri and driver Kaarlo Partanen (yellow suit)

A number of Finnhorses taking part in the contest have won multiple times. This reflects the durability of the Finnhorse, and the length of its effective racing career. Of stallions, Vieteri, Vekseli, and Viesker won the title of Ravikuningas five times. Before the separate divisions, the mare Tomu yh 745 won the Ravikuningas title four times (in 1930–1933). The mare Valomerkki won the title of Ravikuningatar four times. The mare Suhina won the title of Ravikuningas once (in 1956, by the 1948 rules), and the title of Ravikuningatar three times (in 1955, 1957 and 1958).
