= List of historical horses =

This list includes actual horses that exist in the historical record.

== Acting and performing horses ==
- Bamboo Harvester, (and his public double, Pumpkin) portrayed a talking horse in the title role of the television series Mister Ed
- Buttermilk, Dale Evans' horse used in films
- Champion the Wonder Horse, portrayed on film with Gene Autry
- Clever Hans, horse that performed math tricks
- Marocco or Bankes's Horse, a late 16th and early 17th-century English performing horse
- Misty of Chincoteague
- Muhamed, German horse allegedly capable of reading and performing arithmetic
- Popcorn Deelites, the horse actor in the film Seabiscuit
- Rex, Morgan stallion who starred in films and film serials in the 1920s and 1930s
- Trigger, palomino trick horse for films with Roy Rogers

== Famous bloodlines ==
- Byerley Turk, a foundation sire of the Thoroughbred breed
- D'Arcy Yellow Turk, early foundation sire of the Thoroughbred breed
- Darley Arabian, a foundation sire of the Thoroughbred breed
- El Shahbaa, ancestress of the Bint Magidaa and Hanan damlines
- Figure, the foundation sire of the Morgan horse breed
- Godolphin Arabian, a foundation sire of the Thoroughbred breed
- Hollywood Dun It, all-time leading reining sire and American Quarter Horse
- King, a foundation sire of the American Quarter Horse breed
- Zippo Pine Bar, leading Western Pleasure sire of Quarter Horses, inducted into American Quarter Horse Hall of Fame and National Snaffle Bit Association Hall of Fame

== Famous owners ==
- Burmese, favourite mount of Queen Elizabeth II; a gift from the Royal Canadian Mounted Police
- Incitatus, favorite horse of Roman Emperor Caligula
- Matsukaze, personal horse of Maeda Keiji (Note: Attested by Miura Jōshin (d. 1644) in Kenmonshū.)
- Old Bob, a driving horse of Abraham Lincoln
- Ýanardag, (born 1991) Akhal-Teke horse owned by Saparmurat Niyazov

== Military horses ==
- Babieca, warhorse of El Cid
- Bill the Bastard, legendary Australian warhorse in World War I
- Black Jack, the last Quartermaster-issued U.S. Army horse, died February 6, 1976
- Blueskin, one of Washington's two primary mounts during the American Revolutionary War
- Bucephalus, favorite horse of Alexander the Great; one of the most famous horses of antiquity; following his death after the Battle of Hydaspes in 326 BCE, Alexander promptly founded the city of Bucephala in his memory
- Chetak, war horse of Maharana Pratap of Mewar in India; died defending its master in 1576 during the Battle of Haldighati
- Cincinnati, one of Ulysses S. Grant's horses during the American Civil War
- Comanche, only documented survivor of General Custer's 7th Cavalry detachment at the Battle of Little Big Horn
- Copenhagen, the Duke of Wellington's favourite horse, which he rode at the Battle of Waterloo
- Çankaya, one of the two personal horses of Mustafa Kemal Atatürk, founder of modern Turkey
- Favorito, the personal horse of Charles Albert of Savoy, King of Sardinia, ridden during the campaigns of 1848
- Gulrang, Golrang ("rose-red charger"), Faridun's horse as he rode out to strike the serpent-king Zahhak.
- Ikezuki, ridden by Sasaki Takatsuna throughout the Genpei War
- Kasztanka, mare that belonged to interwar Poland's leader, Marshal Józef Piłsudski, that he used during World War I
- Käthy, mare that belonged to Finland's military leader, Marshal C. G. E. Mannerheim, that he used during World War II as his last horse
- Laili, stallion warhorse belonging to Maharaja Ranjit Singh, 1st monarch of the Sikh Empire.
- Little Sorrel, Stonewall Jackson's horse in the American Civil War
- Marengo, Napoleon's warhorse which was captured by the British, and outlived Napoleon by eight years
- Nelson, one of Washington's two primary mounts during the American Revolutionary War
- Old Whitey, Zachary Taylor's horse during the Mexican–American War
- Palomo, main horse of Simón Bolívar during his campaigns of national liberation
- Red Hare (Chitu) horse owned by the warlord Lü Bu, who lived during the late Eastern Han dynasty of China (Note: This man's biography: "Lü Bu dian 呂布傳", "Book of Wei", Records of the Three Kingdoms)
- Sakarya, personal horse of Mustafa Kemal Atatürk, founder of modern Turkey, named for the Battle of the Sakarya
- Saluzi, warhorse owned by Emperor Taizong of Tang
- Sefton, British Army horse that survived the Hyde Park and Regent's Park bombings in 1982
- Reckless, became a decorated U.S. Marine for carrying supplies and ammunition into battle during the Korean War
- Shadowless (Jue ying) of Cao Cao, attested by an annotator to the Book of Wei (5th cent.) (Note: Book of Wei, quoted in the annotation by Pei Songzhi to the "Annals of Emperor Wu", "Book of Wei", Records of the Three Kingdoms (3rd cent.).)
- Streiff, horse of Gustavus Adolphus of Sweden at the Battle of Lützen (1632)
- Surusumi ("Ink-stick") of Yoritomo was bestowed to Kajiwara Kagesue (Note: A third horse, Waka shirage/Waka shiraga/Waka shiroge (若白毛; "young white-coat") aka Machigimi (町君) is named alongside in Genpei Seisuiki.)
- Tencendur, warhorse of King Charlemagne (Note: Pseudo-historical. The horse Tencendur, like the king's sword Joyeuse appears in 12th century Song of Roland which is not a historical record attestation.)
- Traveller, Robert E. Lee's horse during the American Civil War and beyond
- Veillantif, horse of Roland (d. 778), a Frankish military leader under Charlemagne (Note: Pseudo-historical. The horse Veillantif, like the sword Durendal appears in 12th century Song of Roland which is not a historical record attestation.)
- Warrior or Old Warrior, the mount of General Jack Seely in World War I; awarded the Dickin Medal in 2014
- Wexy, the war horse of the then Prince of Orange, Prince Willem Frederik of Orange, the later King William II of the Netherlands which he rode during the Battle of Waterloo. After its death, the horse was mounted and is preserved at the Royal Stables in The Hague.
- Rakhsh, horse of Rostam, the great Iranian champion
- Shabdiz, horse of Khosrow Parvi, shah of Iran

== Non-racing competition horses ==
For racehorses, such as Secretariat and Man o' War, see List of racehorses.

- Big Ben (1976–1999), Canadian international and Olympic-level show jumper
- Brentina (1991–2021), American international and Olympic-level dressage horse
- Halla (1945–1979), German show jumper that carried her injured rider to gold medals in the 1956 Summer Olympics
- Hickstead (1996–2011), Canadian international show jumper and Olympic individual show jumping gold medal winner
- Huaso (1933–1961), Chilean show jumper which set the high jump world record in 1949, one of the world's longest unbroken sport records (Note: As of 2025, this 76-year-old record has not been surpassed)
- Midnight (1916–1936), a bucking horse inducted into several halls of fame
- Milton (1977–1999), British showjumping gelding ridden by John Whitaker, won several world championships
- Noble Flaire (1984–2006), Morgan horse who was the first to win three park harness world championships at the American Morgan Horse World Championship Horse Show
- Rugged Lark, a very successful show competition quarter horse inducted into the American Quarter Horse Hall of Fame
- Scamper (1977–2012), a champion barrel racer that won the Women's Pro Rodeo world championship ten years in a row, and many other top competitions. Scamper, a gelding, was cloned and his offspring stood at stud.
- Seldom Seen (1970–1996), a small Thoroughbred-Connemara honored by the United States Dressage Federation in 2005 for its competition achievements, talent, and being an ambassador for the sport.
- Snowman (1948–1974), won the 1958 National Horse Show Open Jumper championship; twice named the American Horse Shows Association Horse of the Year; enormously popular with audiences, making television appearances and inspiring books
- Totilas (2000–2020), Dutch Warmblood stallion, first horse to score above a 90 in dressage (90.75 in 2009 and 92.3 in 2009)
- Touch of Class (1973–2001), Thoroughbred show jumper, won two gold medals in the 1984 Olympics
- Valegro (2002–2025), Dutch Warmblood gelding with four Olympic medals in dressage; broke Totilas' world records with a score of 93.975 in 2013, then 94.3 in 2014

== Racehorses ==
See List of racehorses and List of leading Thoroughbred racehorses.

== Record setting horses ==
- Big Jake, former world's tallest living horse
- Brooklyn Supreme, said to be the largest horse in history
- Old Billy, longest-living horse verified ever
- Sampson, tallest horse, a Shire horse standing 21.25 hands (86.5 inches; 220 cm) high

== Science and medicine ==
- First Flight, a horse which was the world's first source of botulin antitoxin for human use. Born in 1960s, died in 1999.
- Jim, a horse used to produce diphtheria antitoxin but which contracted tetanus, causing contamination of some of the samples and resulting in several human deaths, leading to the Biologics Control Act of 1902
- Occident, the trotting horse in the early motion photography study of 1878
- Prometea, the first cloned horse (2003) and the first to be carried to term by its genetic donor

== See also ==
- American Horse of the Year
- Equine recipients of the Dickin Medal
- List of horses in mythology and folklore
- List of fictional horses
- Old Friends Equine § Notable residents
