= Marocco =

Marocco may refer to:

- the Italian name for Morocco
- Marrakesh, a major city in Morocco
  - Marocco (see), its former Roman Catholic diocese and present Latin Catholic titular see
- Bankes's Horse (c. 1586 – c. 1606), an English performing horse
- Marocco (surname)

== See also ==
- Morocco (disambiguation)
