= Laili =

Laili or Leili may refer to:

- Laili (cave), a cave in East Timor
- Laili (horse), a warhorse belonging to Maharaja Ranjit Singh of the Sikh Empire
- MS Leili or MS Hildasay

== People with the name ==
- Laili Helms, Taliban advocate
- Leili Rashidi, Iranian theater and film actress

== See also ==
- Leila (disambiguation)
- Leyli Khaneh or Laili Kand, a village in Bakrabad Rural District, Iran
