= Palomo (disambiguation) =

Palomo is a Chilean stratovolcano.

Palomo may also refer to:

- Palomo (surname)
- Palomo (horse), Simón Bolívar's horse
- Palomo (band), a Mexican band with Universal Music Latin Entertainment
