= Brooklyn Supreme =

Horse famed for his massive size

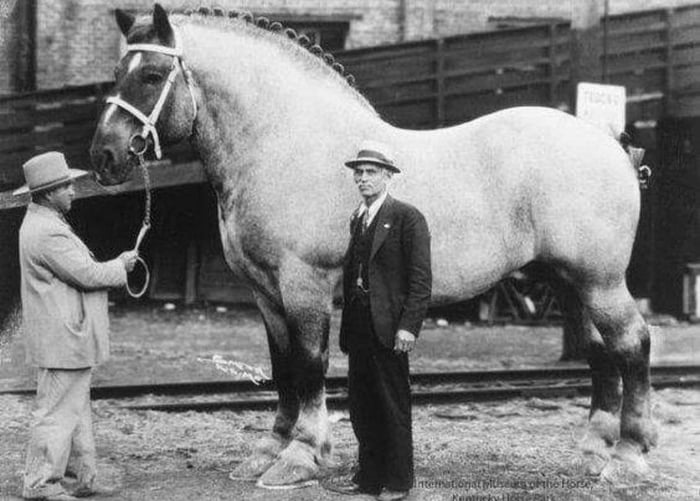
Brooklyn Supreme c. 1930

Brooklyn "Brookie" Supreme (April 12, 1928 – September 6, 1948) (Note: Guinness Book of World Records states April 12, 1928 – September 6, 1948. Many sources list no exact birthdate but state the years 1928–1948. Strangely, the source with the most specific information (including an ancestor, foaling location, dates, and original ownership) indicates June 6, 1930 – 1950, but another source states that the horse placed "First in Yearling Stallion class and Reserve Junior Champion at the 1929 Iowa State Fair.") was a red roan Belgian stallion noted for his extreme size. Although disputed, the horse may be the world record holder for largest (but not tallest) horse and was for a while designated the world's heaviest horse before Sampson was found to have been heavier. He stood 19.2 hands (198 cm (6 ft 6 in)) tall and weighed 3,200 lb (1,451.5 kg) with a girth of 10 ft 2 in (3.10 m). Each of his horseshoes required 30 in (76 cm) of iron.

The horse was foaled on the Brooklyn Center, Minnesota, farm of Earle Brown, who first exhibited him. Before becoming oversized, the stallion "had been Grand Champion of his breed in many state fairs". One of his great-grandfathers was another famous horse, Farceur 7332.

For much of his fame, Brooklyn Supreme was owned by Charles Grant Good of Ogden, Iowa; Ralph M. Fogleman of Callender, Iowa, partnered with Good and exhibited the horse around the US, charging spectators 10 cents to view the animal.

== See also ==
- List of historical horses
- Strawberry roan (horse color)
