= American Belgian Draft =

American breed of draft horse

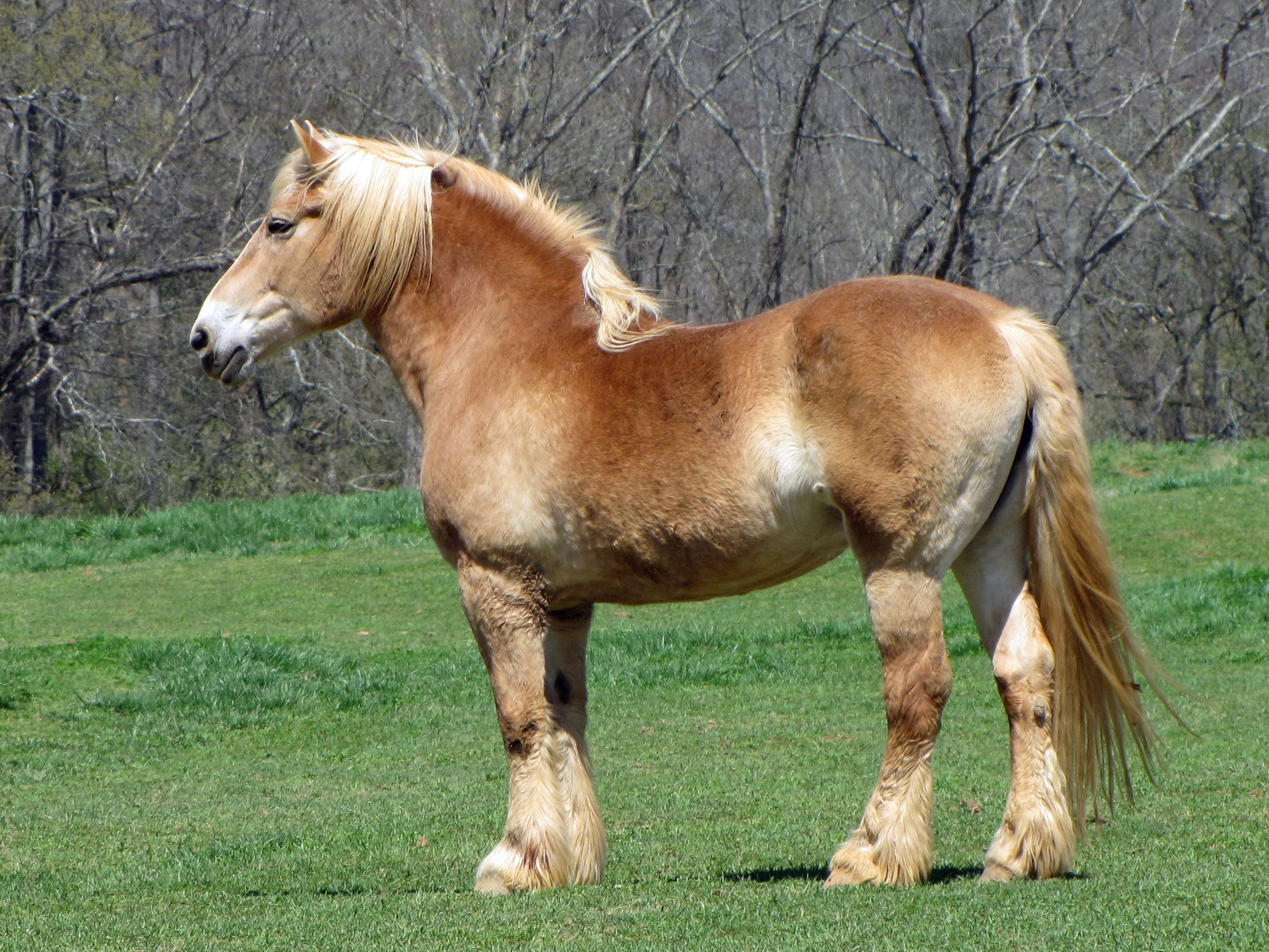
- Belgian draft with chestnut and flaxen coloring
- Conservation status: FAO (2007): not at risk; Livestock Conservancy (2022): recovering; DAD-IS (2022): not listed
- Other names: American Belgian; Belgian; Belgian Heavy Draft
- Country of origin: United States
- Distribution: United States; Canada
- Use: draft work; pulling competitions; showing

Traits
- Color: usually sorrel (light flaxen chestnut); also bay, black, gray, red bay or roan

The American Belgian Draft is an American breed of draft horse. It derives from the draft horses of Belgium but, as a result of isolation and different selective breeding, became genetically distinct from them in the early part of the twentieth century. It is generally taller and less heavily built, and has a very different distribution of coat colors.

== History ==
The American Belgian derives from heavy draft horses of Ardennais, Brabant and Flemish stock imported from Belgium in the latter part of the nineteenth century and in the early years of the twentieth. A breed association, the American Association of Importers and Breeders of Belgian Draft Horses, was founded in 1887 in Wabash, Indiana. Imports ceased during the First World War, resumed in the 1930s, and ceased again when the Second World War broke out; Erwin F. Dygert of Iowa bought a horse from the last shipment made from Europe as the war was beginning.

From the 1920s the American Belgian was bred to be somewhat taller and lighter-bodied than the original European stock.

With the mechanization of agriculture in the post-war years, demand for draft horses fell sharply, and annual registrations of the American Belgian fell to a few hundred per year. Both numbers and demand gradually recovered, and it is now the most numerous breed of draft horse in the United States.

== Characteristics ==
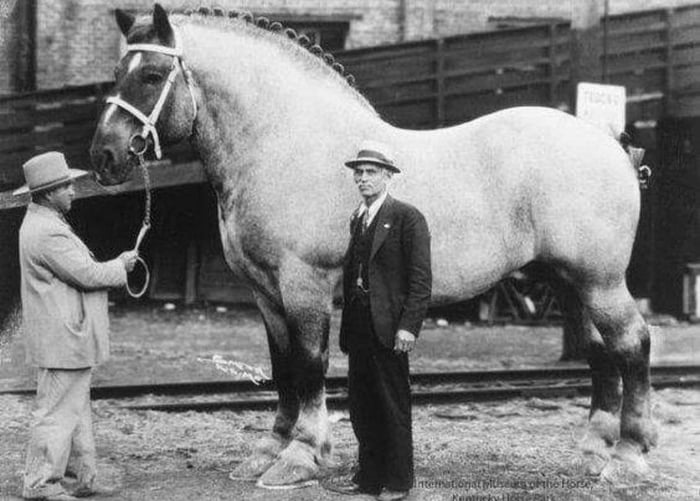
Brooklyn Supreme, an exceptionally massive American Belgian Draft stallion

The American Belgian is a large heavy horse; it is rather taller and more lightly built than the Belgian Brabant, more similar to the Flemish Horse. Some are very large: a stallion named Brooklyn Supreme is among the largest horses on record, and was of this breed, as was Big Jake, a gelding born in 2001, who while alive was listed by the Guinness World Records as the tallest living horse.

The most usual color is light chestnut with a flaxen mane and tail, sometimes called "sorrel"; other possible coat colors are bay, black, gray, red bay and roan. The head is relatively small and well-shaped in comparison to that of other draft breeds.

The American Belgian Draft has a high incidence of junctional epidermolysis bullosa, an inherited genetic disorder that affects newborn foals, often resulting in death. A study conducted in 2001–2003 found 17.1% of Belgians tested in the US and Canada to be carriers. A polymerase chain reaction test for the disease became available in 2002; the Belgian Draft Horse Corp requires testing. Belgians are also at risk of chronic progressive lymphedema, which causes swelling in the lower legs.

== Uses ==
American Belgians are used as working animals and in pulling contests. They may also be shown or ridden.

Belgians in use

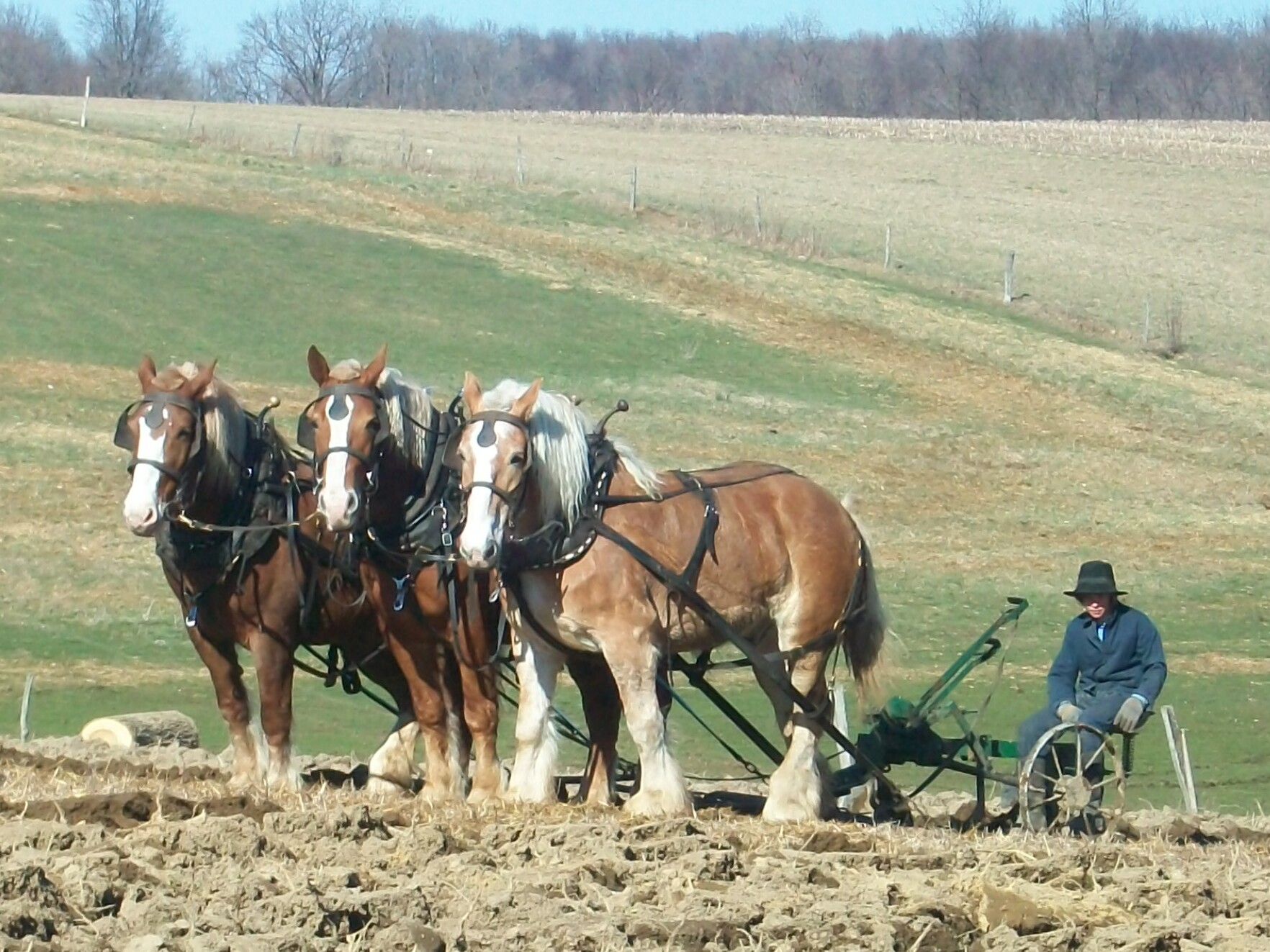
Plowing

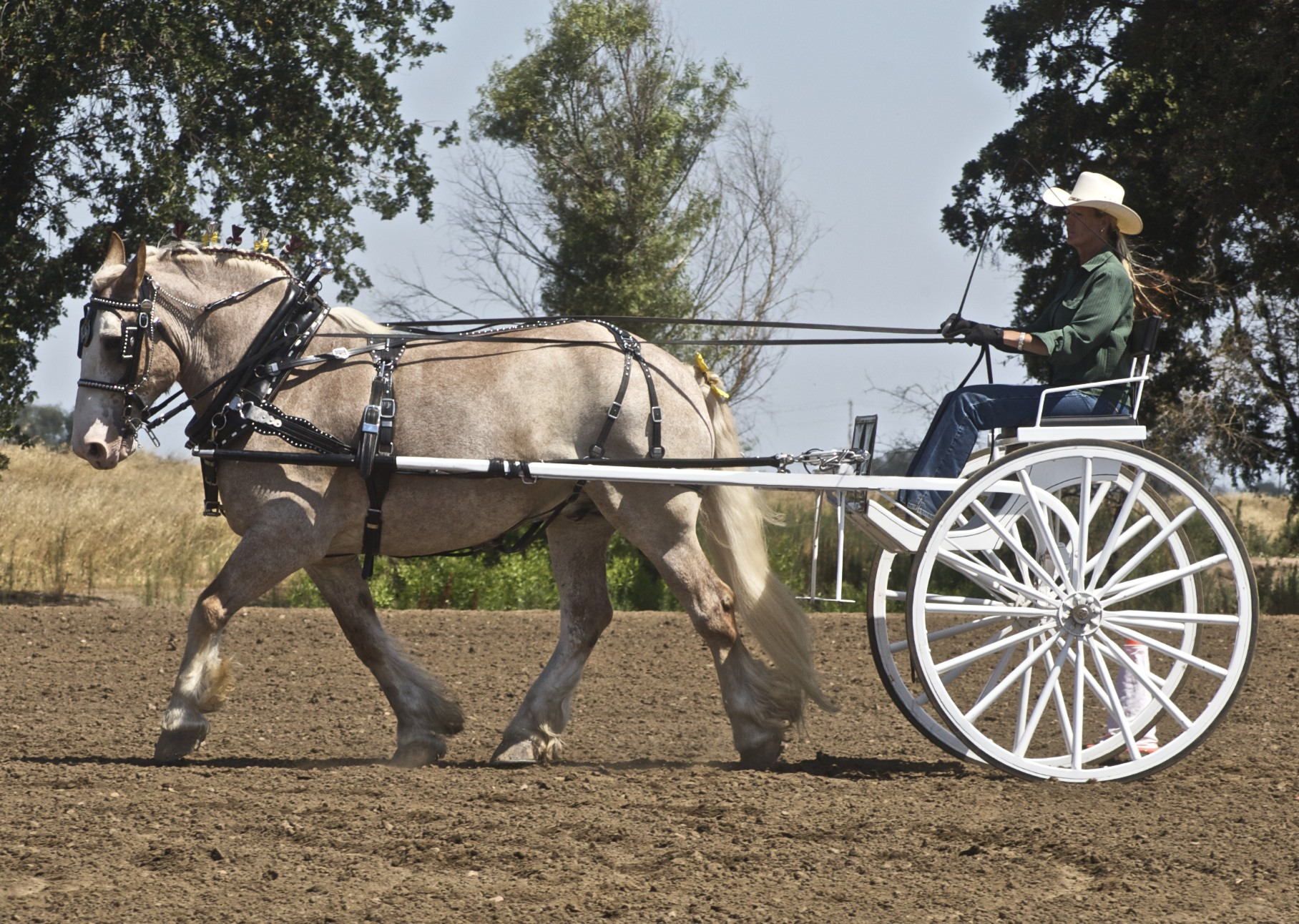
Driving

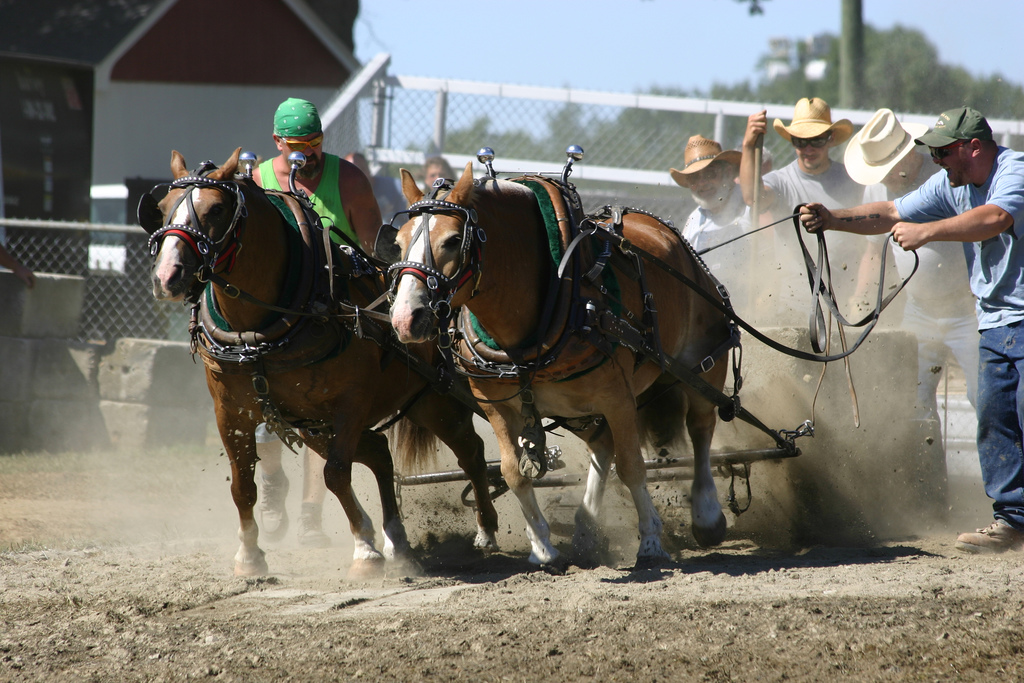
Pulling

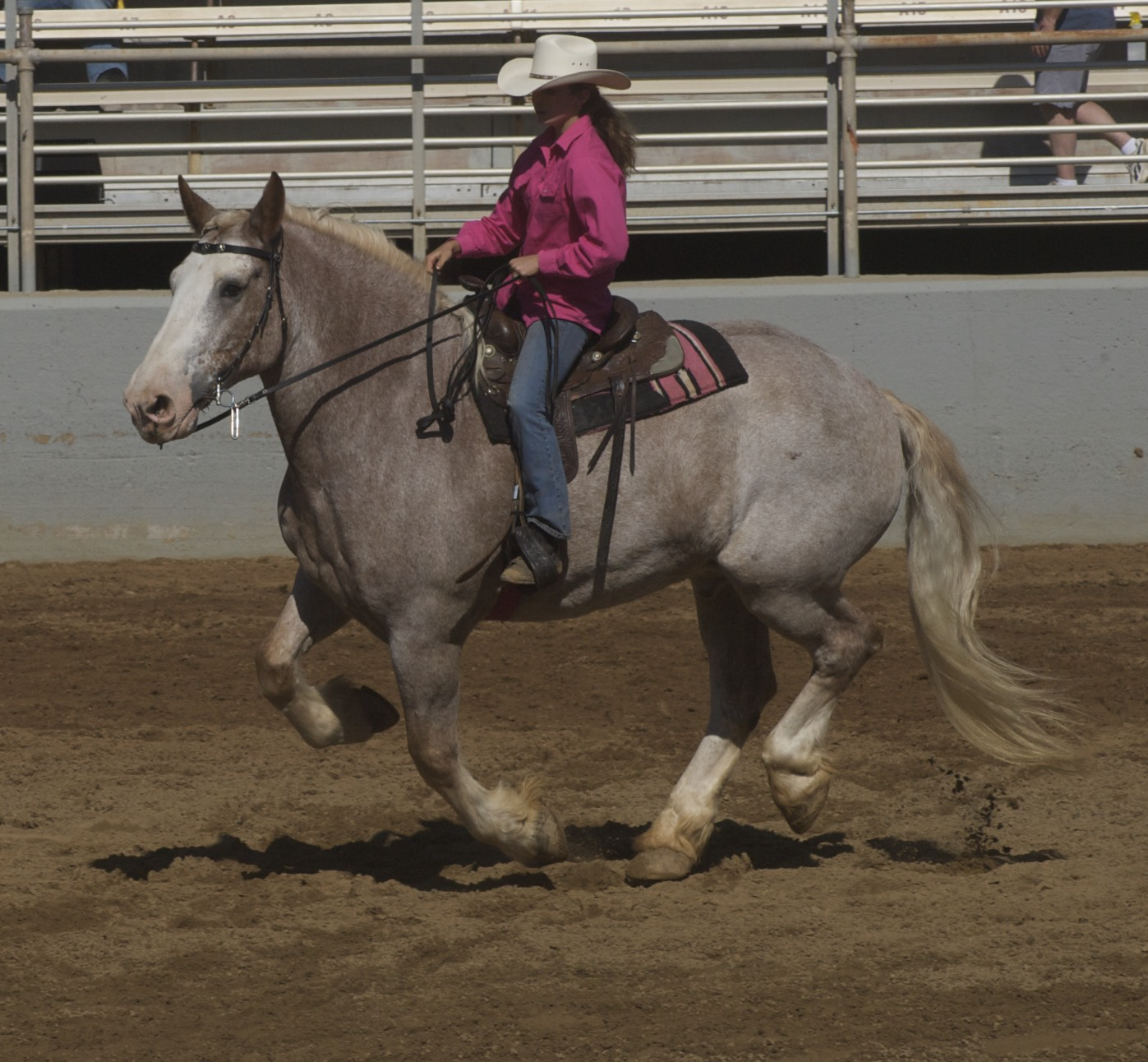
Riding
