= Harry deLeyer =

Dutch horse trainer (1927–2021)

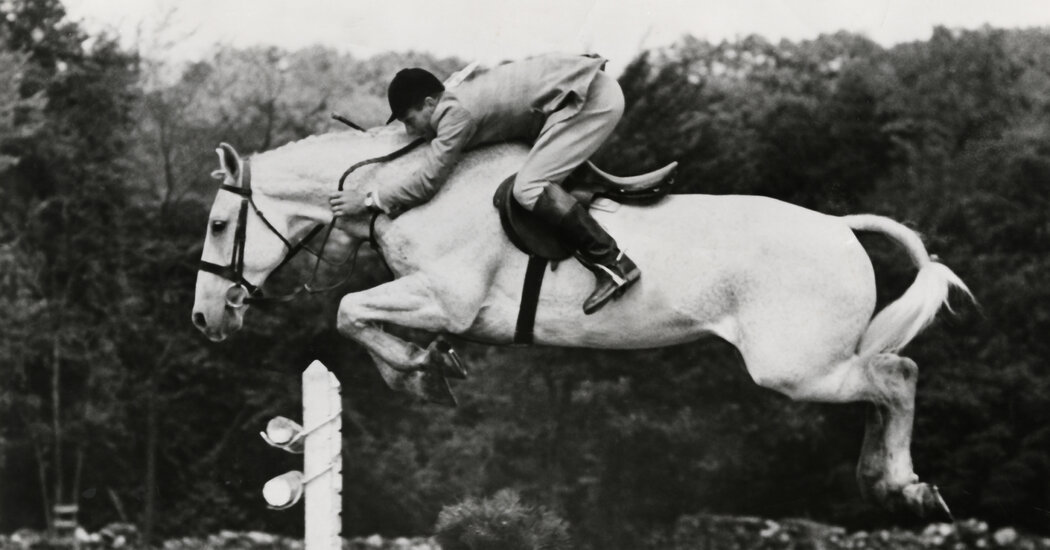
Harry deLeyer and Snowman

Harry E. deLeyer (September 21, 1927 – June 25, 2021) was a Dutch-American competitive show jumper. He is most famous for rescuing an old plow horse from the slaughterhouse, and a few years later winning national shows with that same horse, which became the most famous horse in America in the 1950s. The horse, Snowman, was eventually inducted into United States Show Jumping Hall of Fame in 1992.

== Early life in Holland ==
Harry deLeyer (pronounced deh-LAY-er) was born in Sint-Oedenrode, Netherlands in 1927. His work experience was primarily on the family farm. DeLeyer learned to ride as a child; by 7 he was competing, eventually making it to the Dutch junior national team.

When the Germans invaded the Netherlands in May 1940, his father turned their farm into a way station for the resistance, hiding Jews and downed Allied pilots in a secret cellar that he dug out next to a barn and disguised under a manure pile. Harry deLeyer was part of the underground during WWII and helped many Jews escape the Nazis through the Netherlands. Also, at night, Harry would ride out on horseback, looking for wounded pilots.

== Emigration to the United States ==
One pilot that Harry found died soon after he was brought back to the farm. The deLeyers buried him, and sent his dog tags back to his parents in North Carolina. In 1950 the pilot's parents sponsored Harry and his wife to come live in the United States. DeLeyer spent four years on a tobacco farm in North Carolina, showing horses on the weekends. He and his family moved to Long Island in 1954, where he became the riding instructor at the all-girls Knox School in St. James.

== Snowman ==
In 1956 deLeyer attended a horse auction in Pennsylvania. Arriving late to the auction (which was over) he observed the unsold horses being loaded into a truck, headed for the slaughterhouse. A large grey horse, which seemed healthy and strong, caught his eye. A retired plow horse headed to the slaughterhouse, he bought it for $80. Upon arriving home, his daughter named the horse "Snowman."

The gentle Snowman was used as a training horse for beginners. Some time later deLeyer agreed to sell the horse to a neighbour, and this is when an unexpected discovery was made. The horse left the neighbour's corral and made his way home to deLeyer's; this happened a couple times and the sale was reversed. Following the horse's miraculous escape, which could only be accomplished by the horse jumping a number of high fences, deLeyer began working with the horse on his jumping, which appeared to be an extraordinary natural ability of Snowman.

After two years of training deLeyer rode Snowman in a local competition, easily taking the Blue Ribbon in the jumper class.

At their first appearance in Madison Square Garden, 1958, Snowman and deLeyer took the blue ribbon. Snowman was named "Horse of the Year" by the American Horse Shows Association (today the United States Equestrian Federation) and won the Professional Horsemen's Association championship, making him one of the few horses to win what was then considered the sport's triple crown.

The press and the public loved Snowman, and his rags to riches story. In 1959 deLeyer and Snowman once again took the Blue Ribbon at Madison Square Garden, and Snowman was again named "Horse of the Year."

DeLeyer and Snowman traveled around the world, delighting fans wherever they went. They were celebrities, appearing in many TV-Shows.

Harry deLeyer continued to compete, and perform exhibitions, with Snowman, though less frequently as the horse aged. In 1969, Snowman officially retired at Madison Square Garden, to a standing ovation as the crowd sang "Auld Lang Syne." Snowman died in 1974 of kidney failure.

== Later life ==
Snowman was not his only horse, and deLeyer continued to ride competitively, even after Snowman's death. Fans called him “The Galloping Grandfather” — he was beloved as a fierce competitor and eager showman. In 1979 he returned to the National Horse Show and once again took the blue ribbon in his class.

He continued to teach riding and train horses, eventually moving to Virginia, where he owned a breeding farm.

== In popular culture ==
Snowman and deLeyer were the subject of the book The 80 Dollar Champion: Snowman, the Horse Who Inspired a Nation (2011) by Elizabeth Letts, a New York Times best seller. and the book Snowman: The True Story of a Champion by Catherine Hapka (Author), Rutherford Montgomery (Draft Writer)(2016).

They were also the subjects of a 2015 documentary Harry and Snowman, which includes extensive interviews with deLeyer.
