= Marrocco =

Marrocco is an Italian surname. Notable people with the surname include:

- Brendan Marrocco, American soldier
- Frank Marrocco, Canadian judge
- Léna Marrocco (born 1995), French figure skater
- Marcello Marrocco (born 1969), Italian footballer
- Luigi Marrocco (born 1946), Italian singer

== See also ==
- Marocco (disambiguation)
