= Snowman (horse) =

Champion show jumping horse

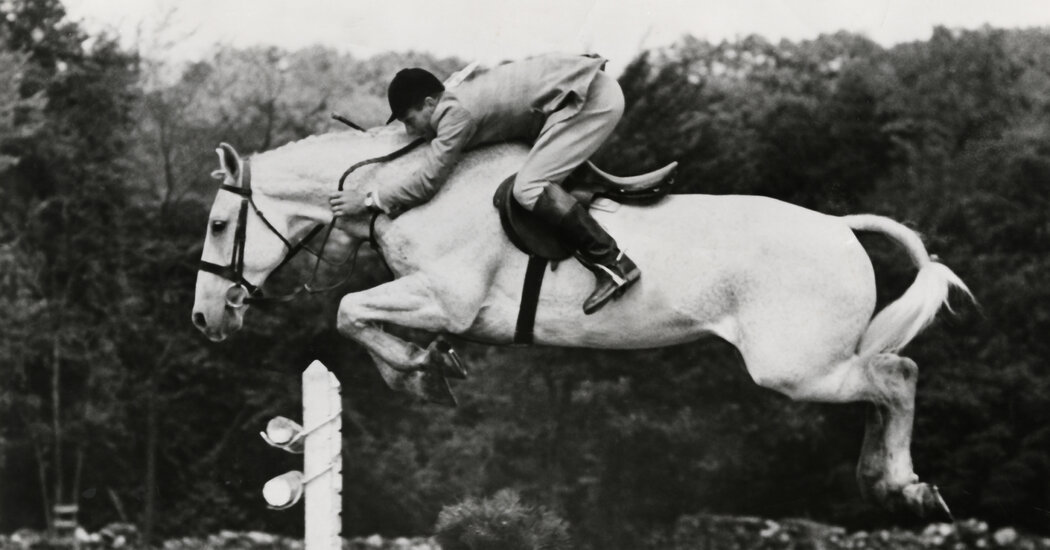
- Breed: Mixed, see below
- Sire: No Records Found
- Grandsire: No Records Found
- Dam: No Records Found
- Maternal grandsire: No Records Found
- Sex: Gelding
- Foaled: February 29, 1948
- Died: September 24, 1974 (age 26)
- Country: United States
- Color: Gray
- Owner: Harry DeLeyer

Earnings
- 5,000,000

Major wins
- 300

Awards
- United States Open Jumper Champion 1958 and 1959

Snowman (February 29, 1948 – September 24, 1974) was a former plow horse of mixed breed ancestry, possibly a cross of a grade horse with a US Army Remount stallion. He was purchased for $80 on his way to a slaughterhouse and became a champion in show jumping in the United States during the 1950s. During his career he was known as "The Cinderella Horse" due to his "rags to riches" story.

== Early life ==
Snowman was originally a plow horse on a farm in Pennsylvania Dutch country. But in February 1956, he was headed for the slaughterhouse at 8 years of age. However, that same day 28-year-old Harry deLeyer left his home on Long Island, New York, to attend the horse auction in New Holland, Pennsylvania, looking for cheap horses for his jumping school. He arrived late, and the only remaining horses were those loaded into trucks bound for the dogfood factory. When deLeyer spotted the gray horse, he had it brought down and bought him for $80.“I needed a quiet horse for the beginners,” he recalled. "I remember seeing his eyes and thinking 'this one seems nice and quiet', I’ll give him a chance". He first used Snowman as a lesson horse for children. DeLeyer recognized talent in the horse after he sold him to a neighbor and the horse jumped high fences to return home. DeLeyer then began training Snowman as a show jumper.

== Career ==
The horse began winning prestigious classes only two years after he was bought off the slaughter truck, and his career lasted five years. He was photographed performing unusual feats such as jumping over other horses, and his calm disposition made him a favorite. He once won a leadline class and an open jumper championship on the same day.

Snowman and deLeyer became popular with the media. First, they appeared in articles in the New York Times. Then they moved to television, appearing on the game show, "To Tell the Truth" and "The Tonight Show" where host Johnny Carson sat on Snowman's back. Snowman had his own fan club. Life Magazine did two profiles on him. There were three best-selling books about him, including the 2011 NY Times Best-Seller, The Eighty-Dollar Champion.

== Death ==
DeLeyer kept Snowman through his retirement in 1962 until the animal was euthanized in the fall of 1974 due to complications from kidney failure at the age of twenty-six.

== Awards ==
- 1958 United States Equestrian Federation Horse of the Year (formerly called AHSA Horse of the Year)
- 1958 Professional Horseman's Association champion
- 1958 Champion of Madison Square Garden's Diamond Jubilee
- 1958, 1959 United States Open Jumper Champion

== Honors ==
- 1992 United States Show Jumping Hall of Fame
- 2015 Horse Stars Hall of Fame

== Legacy ==
In 2005, Snowman was made into a Breyer horse model on the Gem Twist mold, which is no longer manufactured. In 2013, Snowman was again introduced in the Breyer line on the Idocus mold. The 2013 model box reads "Snowman - Show Jumping Hall of Famer".

Snowman is the subject of the book, The Eighty Dollar Champion: Snowman, the Horse That Inspired a Nation, by Elizabeth Letts, published by Random House in 2011, a No. 1 New York Times bestseller. A documentary movie was made in 2016, Harry & Snowman, that features original footage of his years as an equestrian family member as well as a show ring competitor. Snowman was featured in season 21, episode 8 of Mysteries at the Museum.

== See also ==
- List of historical horses

== Bibliography ==
- Tony Palazzo, The Story of Snowman the Cinderella Horse (1962) Duell, Sloan and Pearce, ASIN: B0007EK9UK
- Montgomery, Rutherford G. Snowman (1967) Meredith Press
- Letts, Elizabeth (2011) The Eighty Dollar Champion. (2011) Random House
