= Flemish Horse =

Belgian breed of draught horse

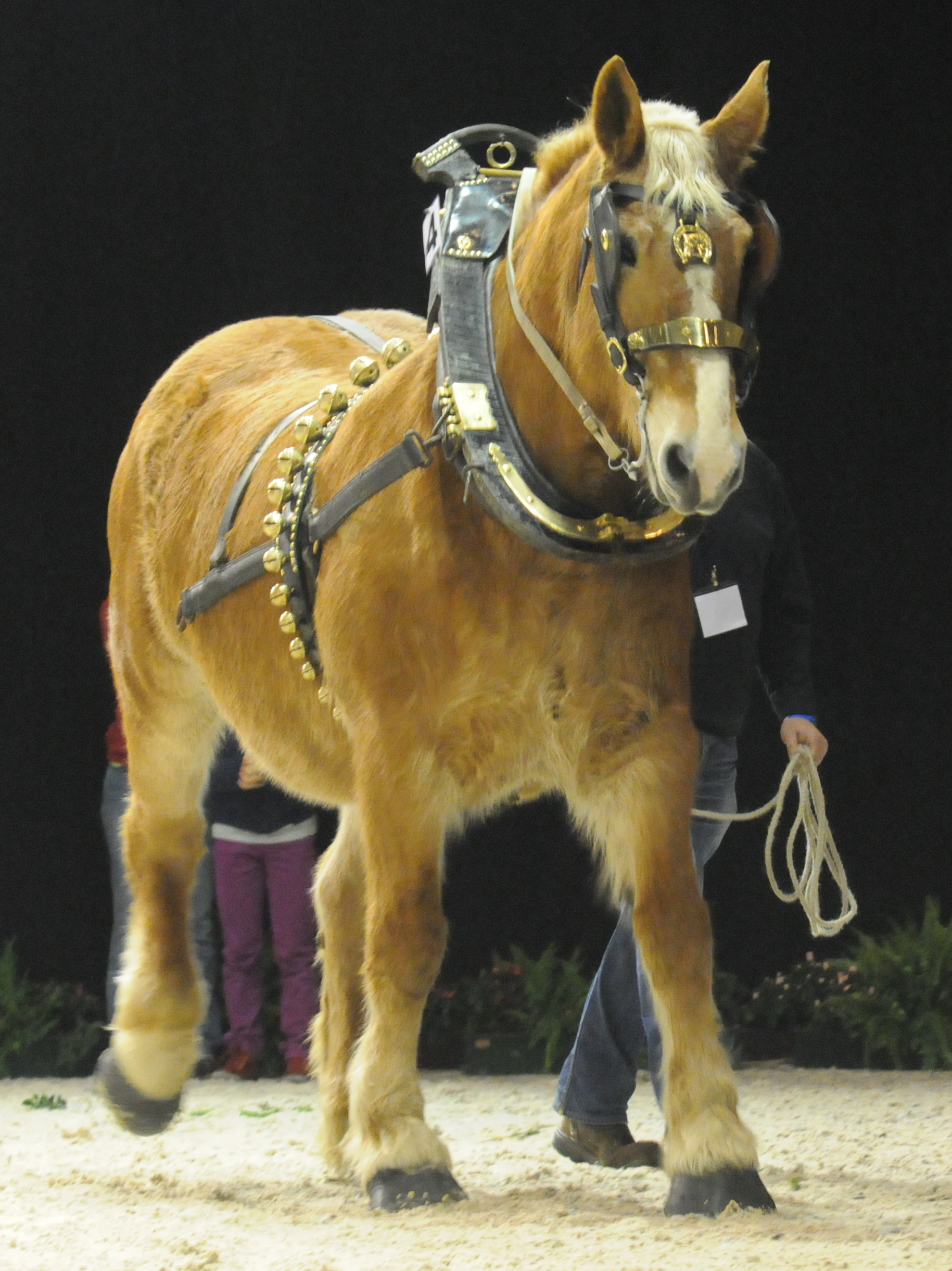
- Conservation status: DAD-IS (2024): at risk/critical
- Other names: Vlaams Paard; Cheval flamand; Flamand; Gros trait du Hainaut; Flanders Horse
- Country of origin: Belgium

Traits
- Height: 1.65–1.75 m
- Colour: usually flaxen chestnut

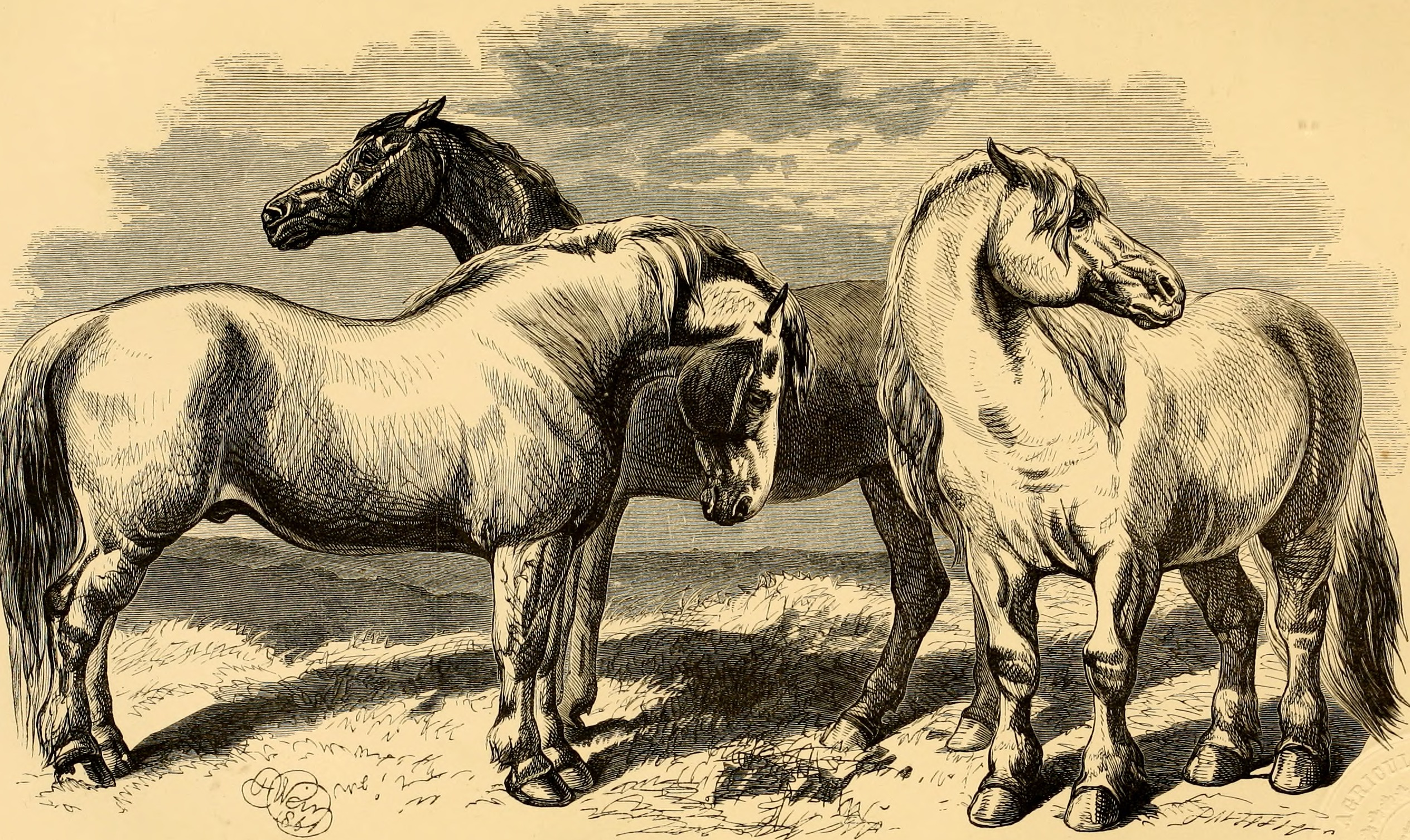
Harrison Weir, 1861, Flemish Horse (right) with Clydesdale (left) and Cleveland Bay (behind)

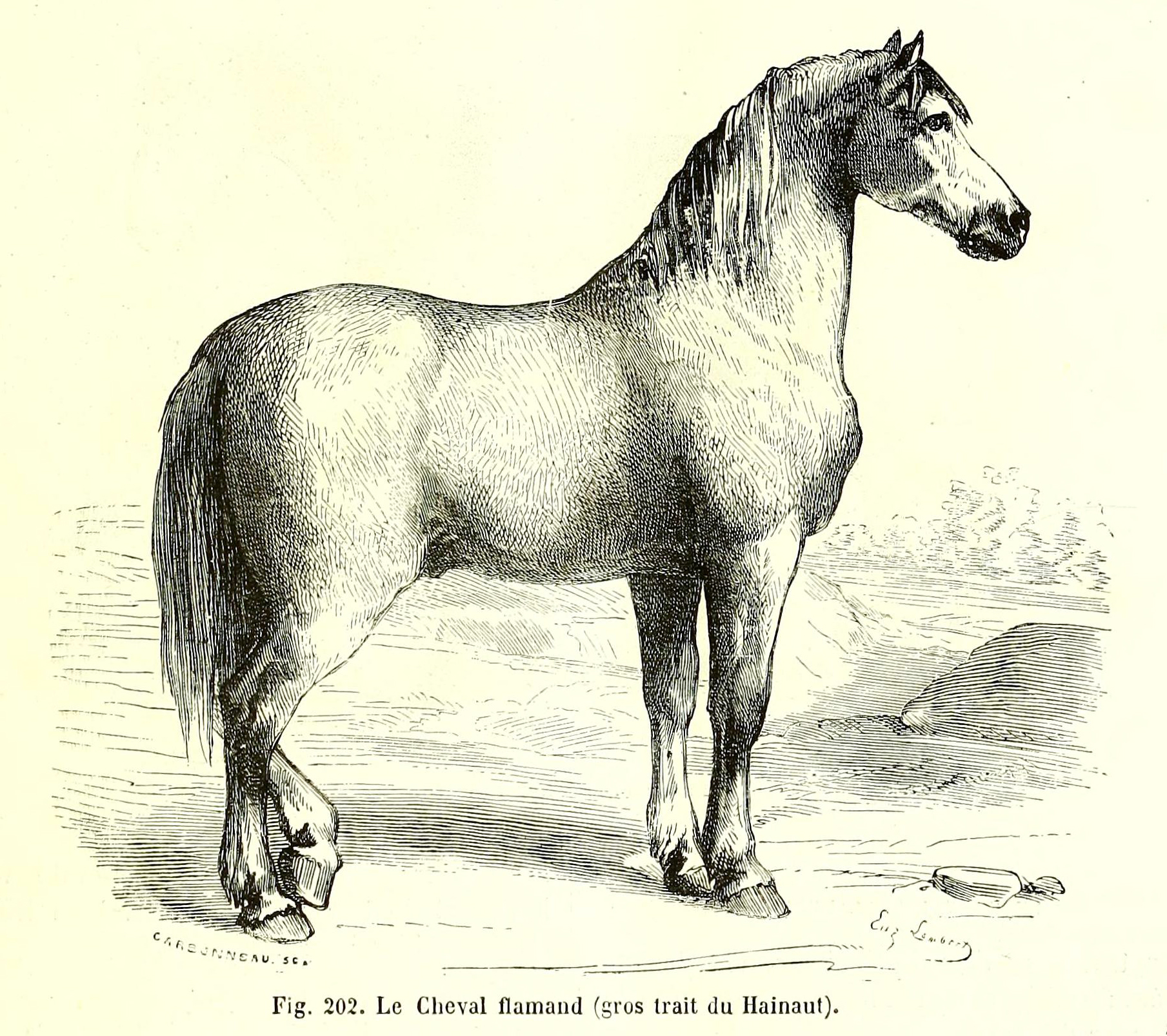
Engraving after Louis Eugène Lambert, 1869

The Flemish Horse, Dutch: Vlaams Paard, French: Cheval Flamand, is a Belgian breed of heavy draught horse. It originates in – and is named for – Flanders, the northern part of Belgium, where its history goes back to Mediaeval times. In the late nineteenth century it was merged with the other heavy horses of Belgium into the Belgian Draught.

It was re-created in the late twentieth century and recognised as a breed in 2005. In the twenty-first century it is an endangered breed, with fewer than a hundred living animals.

== History ==
The heavy horses of Flanders became famous in Mediaeval times. They were among the gifts sent by Charlemagne to the Abbasid caliph Haroun ar-Rashid in 807.

The breed became extinct in the nineteenth century, when it was merged with the Brabant to create the Belgian Draught. From about 1993 it was recreated, partly from stock kept by Amish people in the United States. A breed association, Het Vlaams Paard, was formed in 1999. In 2005 the breed was officially approved by the Flemish government, and the breed association authorised to manage the stud-book.

It is an endangered breed. In 2013 total numbers were about 100 head, with about 35 brood mares and 5 stallions.

== Characteristics ==
The Vlaams Paard, like several other draught breeds with Belgian Draught ancestry, may be affected by junctional epidermolysis bullosa. Unlike the Belgian Draught, it is not susceptible to chronic progressive lymphoedema.
