= Buttermilk (horse) =

Horse actor

- Breed: American Quarter Horse
- Sex: Gelding
- Foaled: April 13, 1941, Wyoming, United States
- Died: October 7, 1972 (aged 31) California, United States
- Color: Buckskin
- Owner: Dale Evans (actress, singer)

Buttermilk (April 13, 1941 – October 7, 1972) was a buckskin Quarter Horse. He appeared in numerous Western films with his owner/rider, cowgirl star Dale Evans.

Buttermilk was ridden by Evans in the 1950s television series The Roy Rogers Show with her husband Roy Rogers who rode his palomino, Trigger. Both horses were extremely popular and became a marketing success with cast iron and plastic replicas, lamps, and dozens of other products purchased by adults and children.

After Buttermilk died in 1972, his hide was stretched over a plaster likeness and put on display at the Roy Rogers and Dale Evans Museum in Victorville, California (the museum has since been relocated to Branson, Missouri).

In 2010, the Branson museum was closed and all artifacts were sold, including Trigger and Buttermilk.

== See also ==
- List of historical horses
