= Muhamed (horse) =

Performing horse (died 1915)

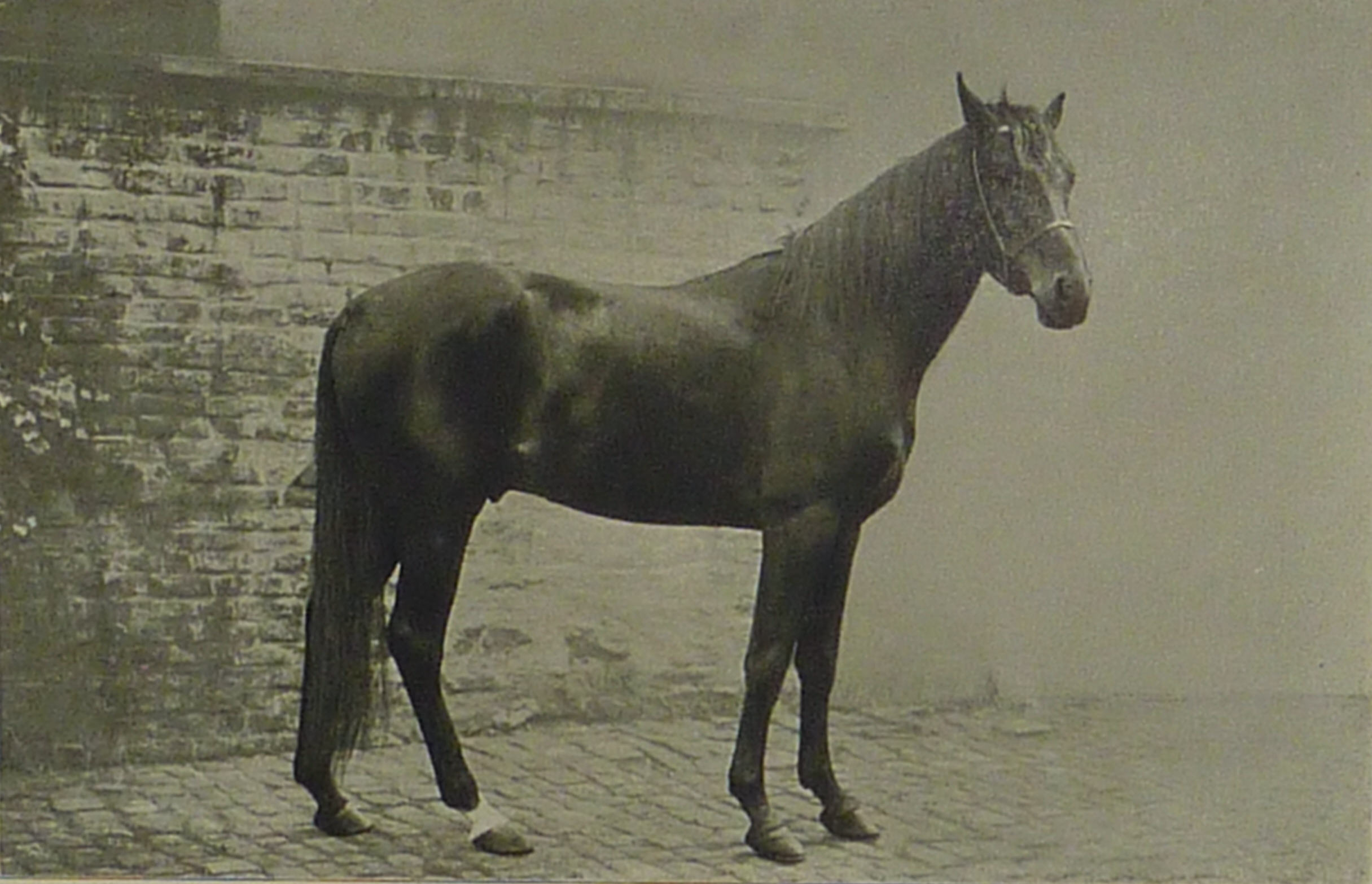
- Muhamed in 1910
- Breed: Arabian horse
- Sex: Stallion
- Died: 1916
- Nationality: Germany
- Known for: Reputed ability to read and do simple math
- Owner: Karl Krall

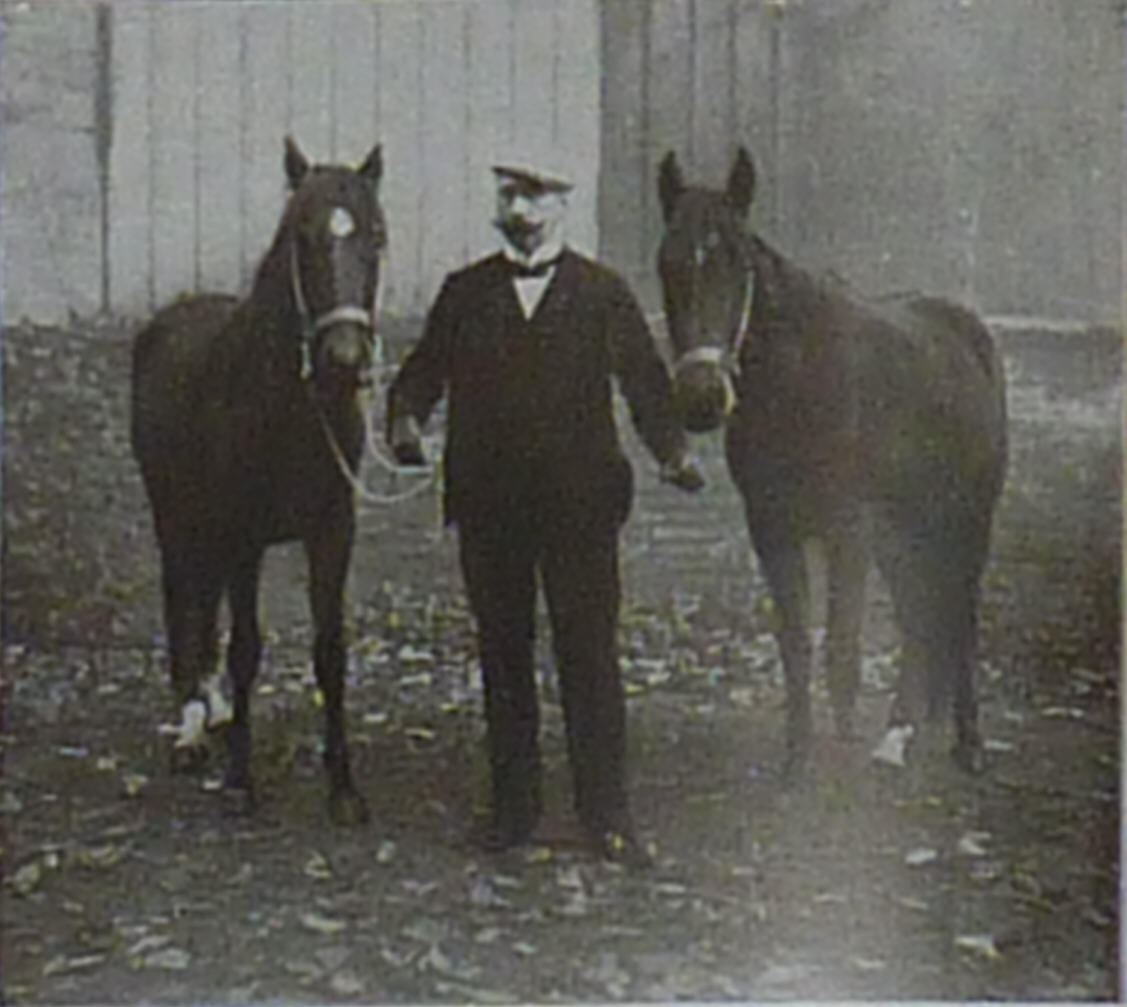
Karl Krall with Zarif and Muhamed, 1908

Muhamed was an Arabian horse that was reportedly able to read, spell, and mentally extract the cube roots of numbers, which he would tap out with his hooves. Raised in Elberfeld, Germany by Karl Krall in the early 20th century, he was one of several supposedly gifted horses, the others being Clever Hans, Zarif, Amasis, and later Berto, a blind stallion.

While all the horses raised by Krall could demonstrate an apparent ability to read and do basic arithmetic, Muhamed could seemingly perform complicated calculations. When tested by psychologists and scientists, a number was written on a blackboard, and Muhamed was asked to extract the cube root. His left hoof represented the tens, while his right hoof represented the ones, so that in order to give the answer sixty-five, he would tap six times with his left hoof and five times with his right. This method of tapping was also used to demonstrate the horse's spelling, although according to reports, they did not correctly handle German orthography. Krall professed disbelief in the notion that Muhamed might be some sort of genius, arguing that human savants are also able to perform mathematical functions rapidly in their heads.

Scientists examining the horses attempted various tests to prove that the horses were being signaled the answers by Krall, and even attempted to blindfold the horses by tying sacks over their heads, and by observing them in the stable through peepholes.

According to Krall, Muhamed, the most intelligent of the horses, eventually began to communicate spontaneously, sometimes tattling on the other horses for being lazy, or on the grooms for beating them.

Among the scholars who tested the horses and came away impressed by them were psychologist Edward Claparède, who claimed that they were genuine, and Belgian writer Maurice Maeterlinck, who claimed that Krall had "humanized" the horses. Noted psychologist Edmund Sanford praised Krall's efforts but was skeptical of the outcomes, describing the results as similar to those "obtained by trainers and magicians through means avowedly deceptive." Sanford opined that although Krall showed good faith he was a person "of active and enthusiastic temperament ... to whom the systematic and formal procedure of science has little attraction."

Muhamed died in 1916.

== See also ==
- Clever Hans
- Marocco
- List of historical horses
