= Marocco (surname) =

Marocco is an Italian surname. Notable people with the surname include:

- Alessandro Marocco (1839/1841-?), illegalist anarchist
- Auguste Philippe Marocco (1885–1972), Monegasque painter
- Cristina Marocco (born 1972), Italian singer and actress
- Frank Marocco (1931–2012), American musician
- Peter Marocco, American government official
- Philippe Marocco (born 1960), French rugby union player and coach

== See also ==
- Marrocco, surname
