= Tencendur =

Fictional warhorse

Tencendur, or Tencendor ("strife") is the warhorse of King Charlemagne in the French epic, The Song of Roland. Tencendur is mentioned in laisse 239 of the poem.

Next with both spurs he's gored his horse's flanks,
And Tencendor has made four bounds thereat.

— (Charles Kenneth Scott Moncrieff translation, 1919)

== Racehorse ==
Named after Charlemagne's warhorse, Tencendur was one of the competitors in the 2015 Kentucky Derby. The racehorse finished next to last, coming in at 17th place.

== See also ==
- List of historical horses
