= Big Jake (horse) =

World's tallest horse

- Breed: Belgian
- Sex: Gelding
- Foaled: March 2001; Nebraska
- Died: June 2021 (aged 20); Smokey Hollow Farm; Poynette, Wisconsin
- Country: United States
- Color: Red
- Owner: Jerry Gilbert

Honors
- Guinness World Records: Tallest horse living

Big Jake (March 2001 – June 2021) was an exceptionally tall American Belgian gelding horse. From 2010 he was the Guinness World Records "tallest living horse", and also the second-tallest horse on record.

== Life ==
Big Jake was born in 2001 in Nebraska, weighing approximately 240 pounds (110 kg), which is about 100 pounds (45 kg) heavier than is typical for his breed. His parents were normal-sized, and he was not unusually tall as a foal. He was bought as a three-year-old by the Gilbert family of Smokey Hollow Farm, near Poynette, Wisconsin. He ate two buckets of grain and about a bale of hay every day. His stall was almost twice the normal size and he was transported in a semi-trailer.

He became the Guinness World Records "tallest living horse" when he was measured in 2010 at 20.2^{3}/_{4} hands (82.75 inches, 210 cm). (Note: Horse heights are measured at the withers) He also became the second-tallest horse on record, after Sampson at 21.25 hands (86.5 inches, 220 cm) (foaled 1846, in Toddington Mills, Bedfordshire, England).

He competed in draft horse showing competitions and was shown at the Wisconsin State Fair.

He died in June 2021; his owners did not give an exact date.
