= Belgian Draught =

Belgian breed of horse

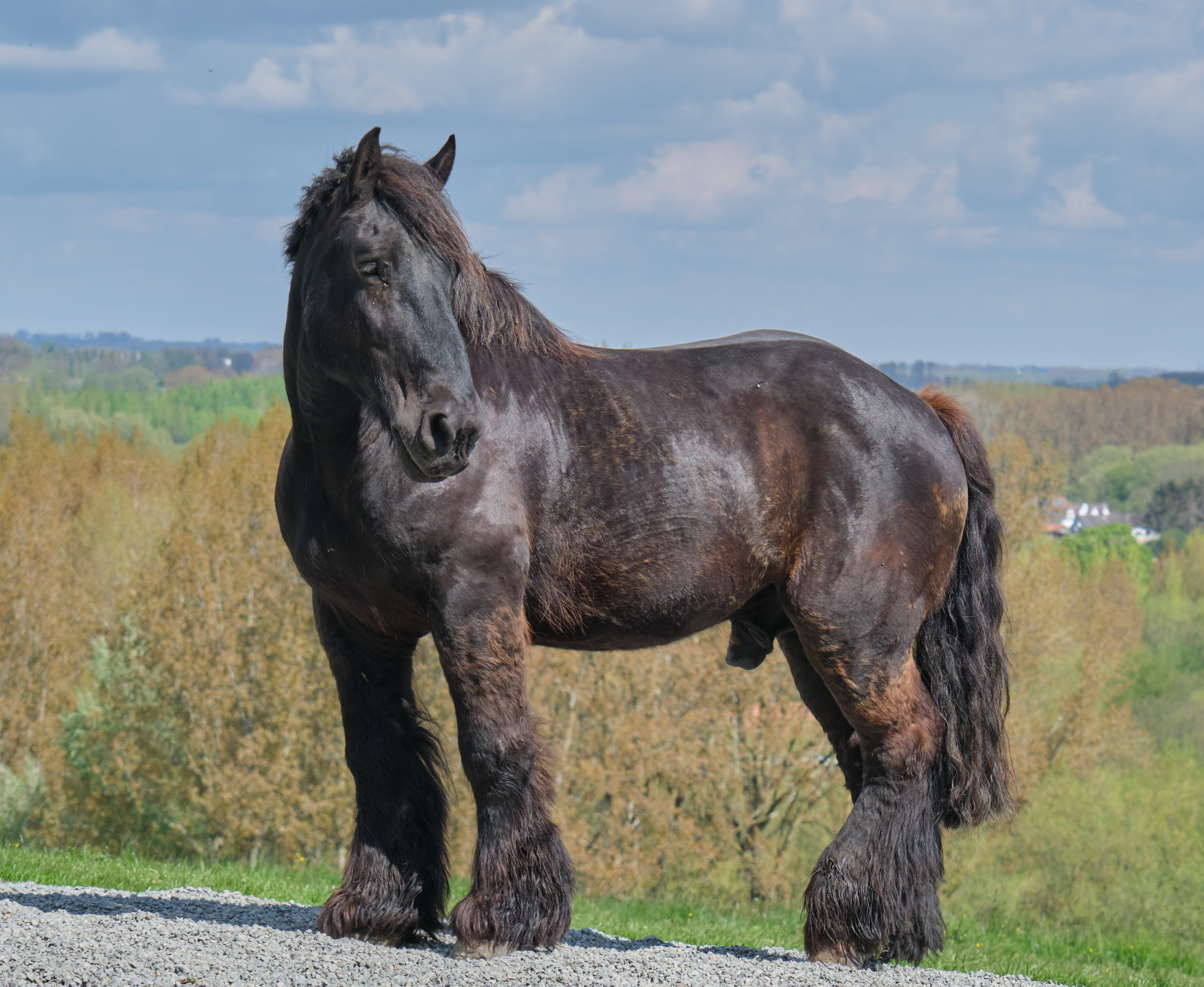

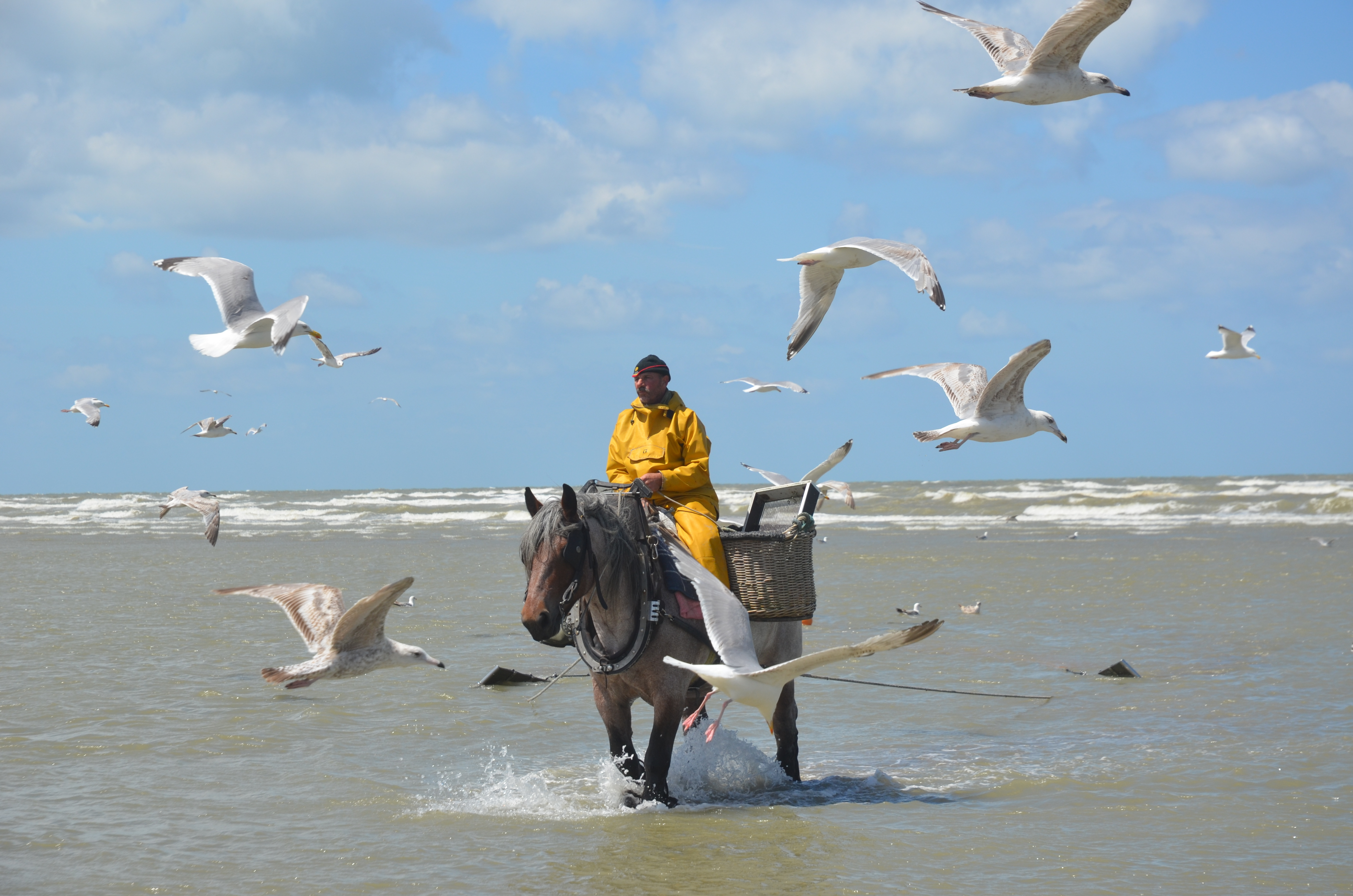
- Shrimp-fishing at Oostduinkerke
- Conservation status: FAO (2007): not listed; DAD-IS (2023): unknown/at risk
- Other names: Belgisch Trekpaard; Brabançon; Brabander; Brabant; Brabants trekpaard; Cheval de trait belge
- Country of origin: Belgium
- Use: farm work; heavy haulage; shrimp-fishing

Traits
- Weight: Male: 900 kg; Female: 700 kg
- Height: Male: 168 cm; Female: 164 cm

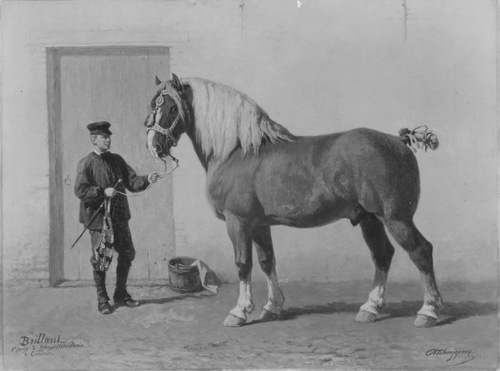
The stallion Brillant, painting by Charles-Philogène Tschaggeny

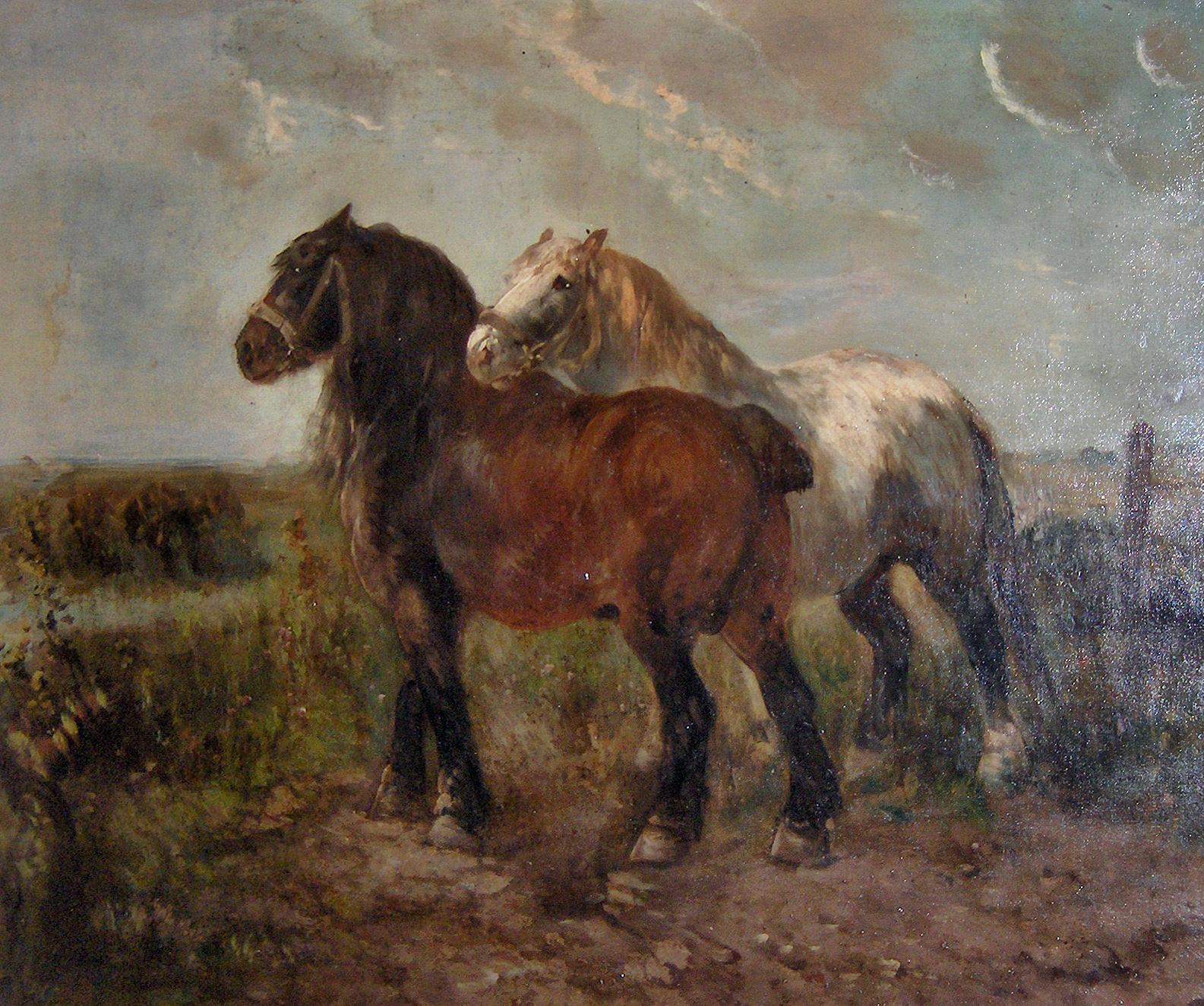
Brabant horses, painting by Henry Schouten (1857–1927)

The Belgian Draught, Dutch: Belgisch Trekpaard, French: Trait belge, is a Belgian breed of draught horse. It originates in the region of the Low Countries that is now central Belgium, and may also be called the Brabant after the former Province of Brabant in that region.

The American Belgian Draught derives from the same original stock, but has developed differently.

== History ==
The Belgian Draught descends from the heavy farm horses of the region of the Low Countries that is now central Belgium: the Colosse de la Méhaigne (Note: Dutch: Koloss uit de Méhaignestreek) from the valley of the Méhaigne in the area of Namur; the Gris de Nivelles et du Hainaut (Note: Dutch: Grijs van Henegouwen of van Nijvel), named for Hainaut region and for the city of Nivelles, now in Walloon Brabant; and the Gros de la Dendre (Note: Dutch: Dikke uit de Dendervallei), named for the Dender river of East Flanders and the area that is now Flemish Brabant.

In 1886 a national breed society for draught horses – the Société Nationale du Cheval de trait Belge – was formed in Brussels; in 1887 it was merged with two earlier regional societies – in Liège and in East Flanders – under the name Société Nationale des Eleveurs Belges. In 1890 the existing stud-books for the three draught breeds of the Kingdom of Belgium – the Ardennes, the Brabant, and the Flemish Horse – were merged into one, with two separate sections, one for the Ardennes and one for the Brabant and Flemish together; the Flemish ceased to exist as a distinct breed. In 1891 the combined stud-book received ministerial approval. In 1919 the society received royal recognition and was renamed the Société Royale du Cheval de Trait Belge. Stud-books were started in the United States in 1889 and in Canada in 1907.

The American Belgian Draught derives from the same original stock, but has developed differently. It is generally taller and less heavily built, and has a substantially different distribution of coat colours.

== Characteristics ==
The Belgian Draught is a tall, powerful and massive horse. Heights at the withers are usually in the range 163–173 cm (64–68 in), with an average height of 164 cm (65 in) for mares and 168 cm (66 in) for stallions. Average weights are approximately 700 kg (1500 lb) for mares and 900 kg (2000 lb) for stallions, but weights of over 1000 kg (2200 lb) are not uncommon. The roan coat colour predominates, accounting for about 80% of all of the horses; some 12% are bay, and the remainder chestnut, black or grey.

=== Genetic diversity ===
The Belgian Draught horse has been identified as having an intermediate level of genetic diversity, and found to have relatively low levels of inbreeding. However, due to low founder diversity, the breed is identified as likely to have a potential compromise of genetic diversity in future generations.
