= Morocco (disambiguation) =

Morocco is a country in North Africa.

Morocco may also refer to:

== Places ==
- Morocco, Indiana, a town
- Morocco, Michigan, a former community

== Media ==
- Morocco (film), a 1930 American pre-Code romantic drama film directed by Josef von Sternberg

== Clubs ==
- El Morocco, a New York City nightclub
- El Morocco (West Las Vegas)
- Del Morocco, a nightclub and music venue in Nashville, Tennessee

== Other uses ==
- Morocco leather, a type of soft, pliable leather

== See also ==
- Murukku, a South Indian snack, also popular in Fiji, Malaysia, Singapore and Myanmar
- Bankes's Horse, or Marocco (also spelled Morocco), a 16th-century performing horse
- Don Muraco (born 1949), American former professional wrestler
- Rick Morocco (born 1963), Canadian-Italian ice hockey executive and former professional player
