= Favorito =

Personal horse of Charles Albert of Savoy from 1831 to 1849

Favorito was the personal horse of Charles Albert of Savoy, King of Sardinia from 1831, and was ridden by him during the campaigns of 1848. After the Piedmontese defeat at the Battle of Novara in 1849, and the king's subsequent abdication, Favorito joined his master in exile in Porto. Following the death of Charles Albert in the July of that year, the horse was brought back to Turin and to the Royal Stables.

On Favorito's death in 1867 his pelt was mounted on a life-size wooden sculpture commissioned from Giovanni Tamone, to a design by Count Stanislao Grimaldi. The horse was equipped as for the wars of 1848–9, including the saddle used by the king in the battle of Novara, and placed along with Charles Albert's other military effects in the Royal Armoury, where he remains on display to this day.

== See also ==
- List of historical horses
