= Brendan Marrocco =

American soldier and quadruple amputee

Brendan Marrocco of Staten Island, New York was the first US soldier serving in Iraq or Afghanistan to survive a quadruple amputation and the first person to receive a bilateral arm transplant at Johns Hopkins Hospital and the seventh in the United States.

== Service career ==
On January 15, 2008, Staten Island Native Brendon Marrocco entered service in the United States Army. He completed his basic training at Fort Benning, Georgia on May 2, 2008, after which, he volunteered for service in the Infantry. He was assigned to the 3rd Brigade, Alpha Company, 2nd Battalion, 27th Regiment of the 25th Infantry Division based at Schofield Barracks, Hawaii.

In late October 2008, his unit was deployed to Iraq and stationed at Forward Operating Base Summerall for a twelve-month deployment in support of Operation Iraqi Freedom.

== Injury ==
During the early morning hours of Easter Sunday, April 12, 2009, while returning to base after a night mission, Marrocco's vehicle sustained a direct hit by an Explosively formed penetrator (EFP) resulting in one fatality and two injuries. As a result of the EFP entering the vehicle through his door, he sustained severe, permanent and life changing injuries.

His injuries include:

- Amputation of both arms and both legs;
- Severed left carotid artery;
- Broken nose, left eye socket and facial bones;
- Loss of eight teeth;
- Shrapnel to the left eye and face;
- Severe lacerations to the face;
- Burns to the neck and face; and
- Pierced left eardrum.

Within one hour, he was transported to the 47th Combat Support Hospital from Ft. Lewis, WA in Tikrit, Iraq by a medevac unit deployed to Tikrit by way of Fort Drum NY, where he underwent emergency surgeries before being transported 3 days later to Walter Reed Army Medical Center via the Joint Operating Base in Balad, Iraq and Landstuhl Regional Medical Center, Germany. Brendan regained consciousness on April 15 at Walter Reed Army Medical Center.

== Transplant surgery ==
In December 2012, a surgical team, led by W.P. Andrew Lee, M.D. of Johns Hopkins Hospital, performed the hospital's first bilateral arm transplant. The surgery took thirteen hours. The surgery connected the bones, blood vessels, muscles, tendons, nerves, and skin on both arms, extending his left arm from the elbow and his right from below the shoulder. The transplant was coupled with a treatment of the deceased donor's bone marrow cells to help prevent rejection of the new limbs.

The study is sponsored by the Armed Forces Institute of Regenerative Medicine of the U.S. Department of Defense. Marrocco made his first public appearance after the surgery at 11:00 AM EST on January 29, 2013, in a press conference with his doctors at Johns Hopkins Hospital in the Bunting Family Interfaith Chapel.

== Current rehabilitation ==
Brendan is currently recovering and undergoing physical and occupational therapy at Walter Reed National Military Medical Center. His home on Staten Island was retrofitted and rebuilt by the Stephen Siller Tunnel To Towers Foundation and Building Homes for Heroes. Marrocco's brother, Michael, lives with him and acts as his 24-hour non-medical assistant.

He was interviewed for the Health Resources & Services Administration website and YouTube channel in 2018, and the Johns Hopkins Comprehensive Transplant Center in 2023.
