= El Shahbaa =

El Shahbaa was one of the foundation mares at the Inshass Stud of King Fuad I of Egypt. He purchased the mare in 1931 by Al Hag Mohammed Ibrahim. The mare was grey (Shahbaa, feminine of Ashhab, in Arabic). Her sire is recorded as El Hamdani El Nasiri and her dam as El Obeya Om Grees from the strain of Ubayyan Umm Jurayss. She is the ancestress of the well-known Bint Magidaa and Hanan damlines.
