= Leyli Khaneh =

Leyli Khaneh ليلي خانه
- Village
- Location within Iran
- Coordinates: 38°36′08″N 46°39′59″E
- Country: Iran
- Province: East Azerbaijan
- County: Varzaqan
- Bakhsh: Central
- Rural District: Bakrabad

Population (2006)
  - Total: 125
- Time zone: UTC+3:30 (IRST)
  - Summer (DST): UTC+4:30 (IRDT)

Leyli Khaneh (Persian: ليلي خانه, also Romanized as Leylī Khāneh; also known as Laili Kand, Leli-Khana, Leylā Khānī, and Leylī Kand) is a village in Bakrabad Rural District, in the Central District of Varzaqan County, East Azerbaijan Province, Iran. At the 2006 census, its population was 125, in 31 families.
