= Junctional epidermolysis bullosa (veterinary medicine) =

Genetic disorder of horses

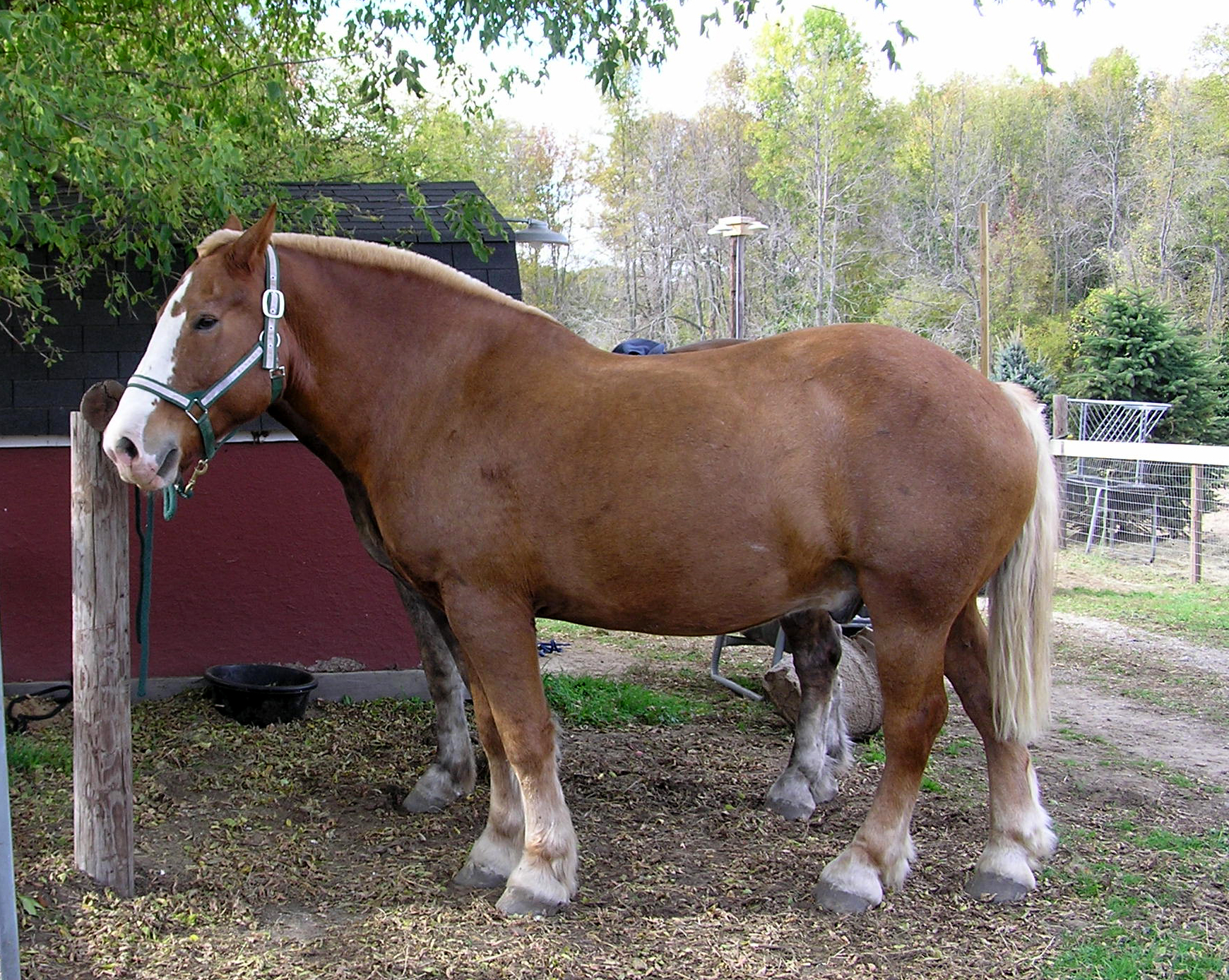
The Belgian Draft Horse is one breed in which JEB occurs

Junctional epidermolysis bullosa (JEB) is an inherited disorder that is also known as red foot disease or hairless foal syndrome. JEB is the result of a genetic mutation that inhibits protein production that is essential for skin adhesion. Therefore, tissues, such as skin and mouth epithelia, are affected. Blisters form over the entire body causing pain and discomfort, and open sores leave newborn foals highly susceptible to secondary infection. The condition can be categorized into two types of mutations: JEB1 and JEB2. JEB1 is found in Belgian Draft horses, as well as other related Draft breeds. In contrast, JEB2 is found in American Saddlebred horses.

== Breeds affected ==
JEB has been documented in Belgian drafts, American Cream Draft, Breton drafts, Comtois, and American Saddlebreds. Of these horses, 12% of Belgians and 4% of Saddlebreds are thought to carry the disorder.

== Humans ==
JEB also affects the human population. Symptoms are closely related to those that are seen in horses. Blisters occur over a large portion of the body and are very susceptible to agitation. There are other symptoms associated, such as alopecia (hair loss), abnormalities of fingernails and toenails, and joint deformities. Children born with JEB may not live past the first year of age if the condition is severe enough. Other children that have a less severe case of JEB may live a normal lifespan.

== Genetics ==
JEB is an autosomal recessive trait; both parents must carry the recessive gene in order to have an affected offspring. If N represents a normal individual and J represents an affected individual, the following crosses indicate the rate of occurrence among related horses.

(N/J) x (N/J) = 50% N/J, 25% N/N, and 25% J/J

(N/N) x (N/J) = 50% N/N and 50% N/J

Foals which are homozygous recessive (J/J) do not make it to reproductive age, so cannot be a parent. Carriers (N/J) do not display symptoms and have normal skin.

Mutations in the genes LAMB3, LAMC2, and COL17A1, are the cause of JEB. These genes are associated with the protein responsible for skin attachment to the underlying layers, laminin 332. When the genes undergo mutations, the protein is altered, making it dysfunctional. As a result, the skin is very fragile and may be damaged by even minor trauma.

Another protein, called type XVII collagen, is affected by a mutation in COL17A1. Due to this mutation, the defective protein is not able to produce collagen, which provides strength and structure for the skin. For this reason, the skins resistance to trauma is weakened.

== Symptoms ==
Foals appear normal immediately after birth. JEB affects tissues including mucous membranes, so one of the first signs is blistering of the gingiva and tongue after the first attempt at nursing. Within the next few days, the foal develops lesions all over the body, especially over pressure points. The proteins affected by the gene mutations are also present in the hooves, causing hooves to slough.

Other symptoms that occur in JEB:

- Corneal lesions
- Dental dysplasia
- Depression
- Oral ulcers
- Suppressed appetite
- Incisors present at birth

== Diagnosis and testing ==
Biopsies of the skin may be performed to identify the cleavage that takes place at the dermal-epidermal junction. Another test that can aid in a diagnosis of JEB is the positive Nikolsky’s sign. By applying pressure to the skin, transverse movements can indicate slipping between the dermal and epidermal layers. An easier and more definitive test is through polymerase chain reaction (PCR). This method allows mane and tail samples to be genetically tested for the mutated genes that cause the condition. Hair samples must be pulled, not cut, with roots attached. The test can detect both JEB1 and JEB2. Testing costs around $35.00 US per sample.

== Prognosis ==
One of the biggest risks factors faced by the affected foals is susceptibility to secondary infection. Within three to eight days after birth, the foal may die from infection or is euthanized for welfare reasons.

== Treatment and prevention ==
Currently, there are no treatments available for JEB. However, the disorder can be prevented through good breeding management. Horses that are carriers of JEB should not be incorporated into breeding programs. Although, if breeders are insistent on breeding a carrier, precautions need to be taken to ensure that the other mate is not a carrier as well. Genetic testing for the disorder is highly recommended among breeding programs for the Draft horse and Saddlebred breeds to determine their carrier status.
