= Palomo (surname) =

Palomo is a Spanish and Italian surname. Notable people with the surname include:

- Ana Belén Palomo (born 1977), freestyle swimmer from Spain
- Eduardo Palomo (1962–2003), Mexican actor
- Tony Palomo (1931–2013), Guamanian historian and politician
- Lorenzo Palomo (1938–2024), Spanish conductor and composer
- Víctor Palomo (1948–1985), Spanish Grand Prix motorcycle racing driver
- Florencio Palomo Valencia, Governor of Yucatán (1936–1938)
- Elena Huelva Palomo (2002–2023), Spanish cancer activist and writer
- Víctor Mena Palomo, Governor of Yucatán (1953–1958)
