= Palomo (horse) =

Simón Bolívar's horse

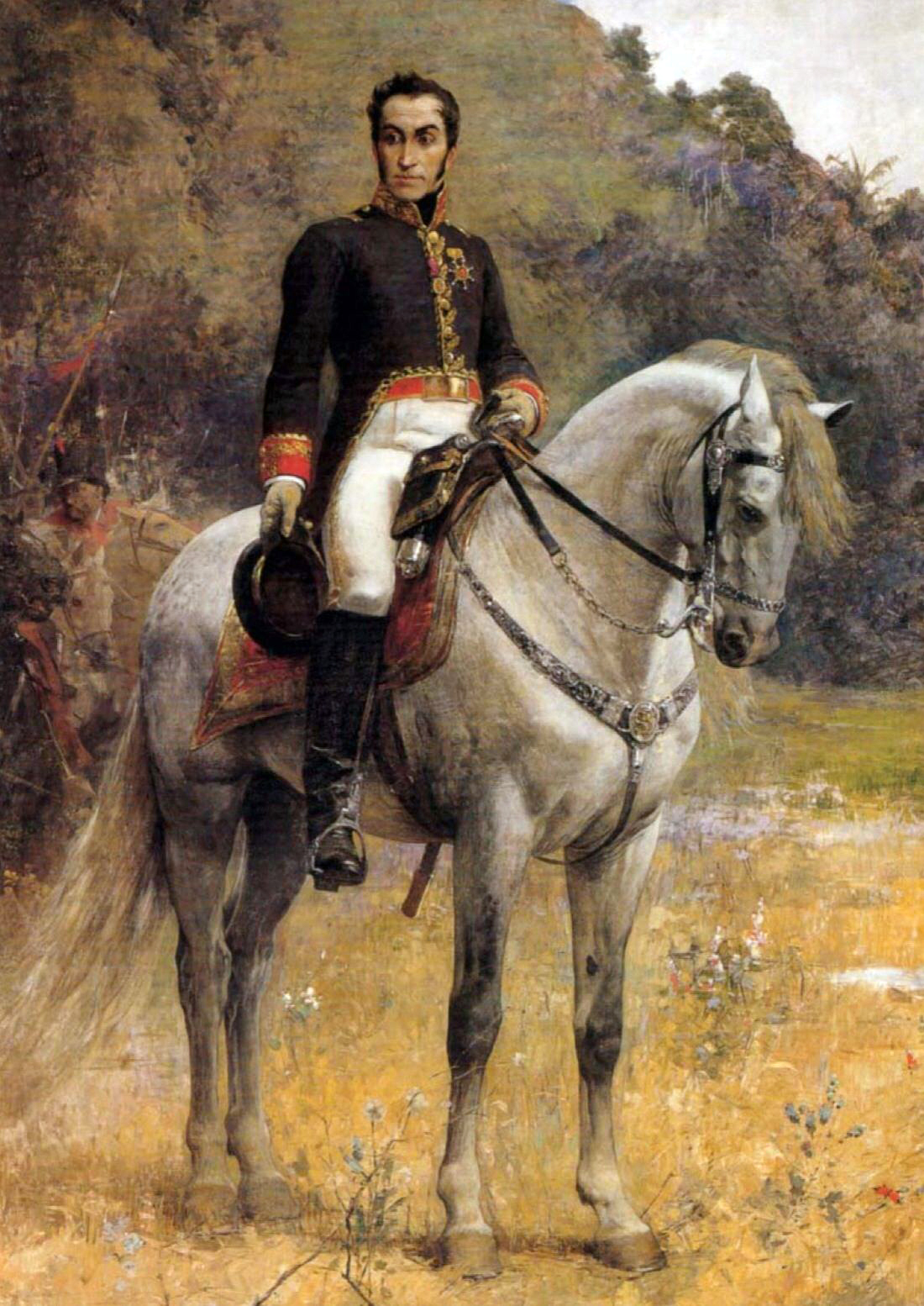

Palomo was Simón Bolívar's horse. It accompanied him on most of his campaigns of national liberation. The horse was white, tall, with a tail that almost reached the ground. It was a gift from an elderly peasant woman from Santa Rosa de Viterbo, Boyacá Department, shortly before the Battle of Boyacá in 1819.

According to local lore Bolívar visited Santa Rosa in early 1814 on his way to Tunja on his way to report to the Congress of the United Provinces of New Granada on his setbacks in Venezuela. As the Liberator approached the town on a tired beast of burden, which refused to move any further. There he asked for a guide to take the animal and to lead him into town. During the walk Bolívar and the guide had a conversation in which the guide told Bolívar about his wife Casilda's dreams, especially one in which she saw herself giving a recently born colt to a famous general as a gift. The guide did not know who Bolívar was and was astonished when he learned his identity. When Bolívar made his leave at the edge of town, he smiled and told the guide, "Tell Casilda to keep the colt for me." Five years later when Bolívar returned to New Granada, he received the colt promised by Casilda in the midst of the Battle of Vargas Swamp. He named it Palomo ("cock pigeon") for its gray color. Later on his way back to Venezuela, Bolívar stopped in Santa Rosa to visit Casilda personally and thank her for the horse.

Bolívar lent Palomo to one of his officers, and it died exhausted after a grueling march in the Hacienda Mulaló, in what is today Yumbo, Valle del Cauca Department. It was buried next to the hacienda chapel by a lush, very old ceiba. Palomo's horseshoes and other effects of Bolívar are on exhibit in the Museum of Mulaló.

== See also ==
- List of historical horses
- List of equestrian statues of Simón Bolívar
