= Elizabeth Letts =

American author

Elizabeth Letts is an American author.

== Biography ==
Elizabeth Letts was born on June 23, 1961, in Houston, Texas. She grew up in Southern California. As a teenager, she was a competitive equestrian three-day eventer. She attended Northfield Mount Hermon School and Yale College where she majored in History. She served in the Peace Corps in Morocco.

She is the author of multiple books, including Quality of Care; Family Planning; The Butter Man; The Eighty-Dollar Champion: Snowman the Horse that Inspired a Nation, a #1 New York Times bestseller.;, The Perfect Horse: The Daring U.S. Mission to Rescue the Priceless Stallions Kidnapped by the Nazis, which reached #5 on the New York Times bestseller list; Finding Dorothy; and The Ride of Her Life. Elizabeth Letts also writes women's fiction under the pen name Nora Carroll.

Her younger brother, John, is a retired professional tennis player.and her father, J. Spencer Letts was a Federal District Court Judge.

== Awards ==
"The Perfect Horse"

- PEN USA Literary Award 2017 for Research Non-Fiction
- Best Books of 2016- Amazon Editors

The Eighty-Dollar Champion

- Daniel P Lenehan Award for Overall Media Excellence from the United States Equestrian Foundation.
- Goodreads Reader's Choice Finalist: Best History and Biography

The Butter Man

- Bank Street College's The Best Children's Books of the Year
- CCBC Choices Recommended Book
- Charlotte Zolotow Highly Commended
- Children's Africana Honor Book
- Junior Library Guild Selection
- Middle East Book Award
- NCSS/CBC Notable Social Studies Trade Books for Young People
- Peace Corps Writers Award
- Storytelling World Award Honor Book for Young Listeners

== Works ==
- Family Planning (NAL/Penguin)
- Quality of Care (NAL/Penguin)
- The Butter Man (Charlesbridge)
- The Eighty Dollar Champion: Snowman, the Horse That Inspired a Nation (Random House, Ballantine Books), 2011
- The Perfect Horse: The Daring U.S. Mission to Rescue the Priceless Stallions Kidnapped by the Nazis. (Random House, Ballantine Books) August 23, 2016
- Finding Dorothy (Random House, Ballantine Books), February 12, 2019
- The Ride of Her Life: The True Story of a Woman, Her Horse, and Their Last-Chance Journey Across America (Random House, Ballantine Books), June 1, 2021

As Nora Carroll

- "The Color of Water in July (Lake Union Publishing, 2015)
- "Academy Girls" (Lake Union Publishing, 2015)
