= Laili (horse) =

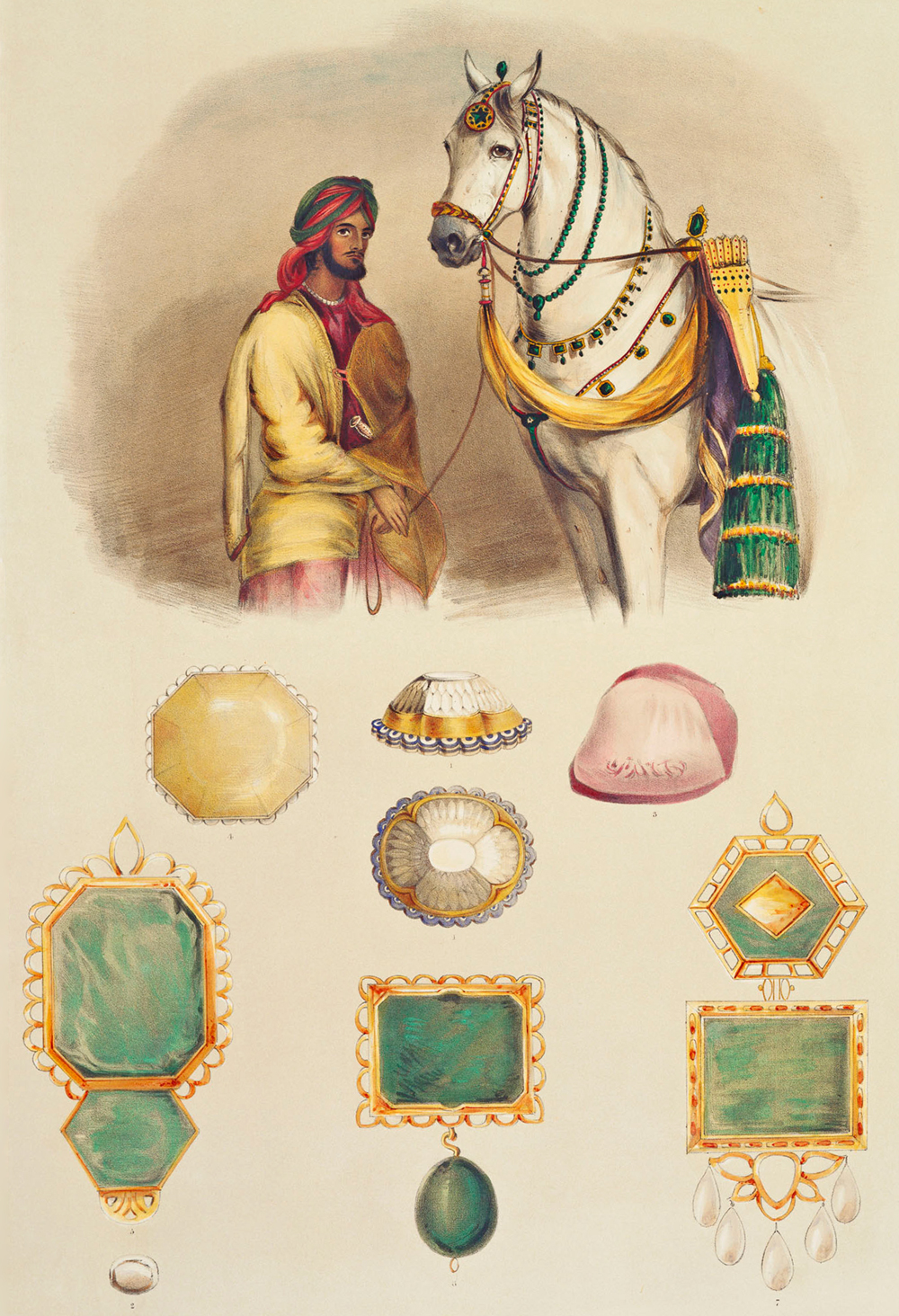
- Laila with his attendant, along with previous stones in the treasury of Ranjit Singh, c. 1844
- Breed: Majhuke
- Sex: Male
- Foaled: 1835
- Country: Afghanistan
- Owner: Yar Mohammad Khan Barakzai; Sultan Mohammad Khan; Ranjit Singh

Laili (*1835) or Laila was a stallionwarhorse belonging to maharaja Ranjit Singh of Sikh Empire (Punjab). The Maharaja’s pursuit of the horse was a significant diplomatic and military episode in the early 19th century.

== Acquisition ==
Ranjit Singh first learned about the horse in 1822, originally owned by Yar Mohammad Khan Barakzai (d. 1829), the governor of Peshawar and a tributary to the Sikh Empire. Ranjit Singh’s efforts to acquire Laili spanned several years and involved multiple diplomatic and military missions led by his French general, Jean-Baptiste Ventura.

Yar Mohammad Khan initially resisted the Maharaja's demands, at one point claiming the horse had died. To appease the Sikh ruler, he sent his own son to the court at Lahore as a hostage in place of the horse. This prompted Ranjit Singh to remark:

He refuses to let me have that horse, but does not scruple to send me his son; does he value his horse more than his son?

The quest for Laili eventually coincided with the uprising of Syed Ahmad Barelvi, who had declared a jihad against the Sikh Empire. During the ensuing conflict in Peshawar, Yar Mohammad Khan was killed. Following the military intervention, general Ventura finally secured the horse from Yar Mohammad's successor, Sultan Mohammad Khan.He returned to Lahore with Laili and another horse named Merwarud.

== Value and legacy ==
The acquisition of Laili was remarkably costly in both human life and financial resources. Contemporary estimates suggest the struggle for the horse resulted in several military skirmishes and a total expenditure of over £60,000 (some sources cite £30,000). At the time, this sum was equivalent to the value of approximately 160 kilograms of gold. He fought the war with Sultan Mohammad Khan, sacrificing 12000 men and captured the horse.

Laili became the most prized animal in the Maharaja’s royal stables, often adorned with the legendary Koh-i-Noor diamond during state processions. The horse remained a symbol of Ranjit Singh's prestige until his death.
