= Sampson (horse) =

Tallest and Heaviest Horse Ever Reported

Sampson (later renamed Mammoth) was a Shire horse gelding born in 1846 and bred by Thomas Cleaver at Toddington Mills, Bedfordshire, England. According to Guinness World Records (1986), he was the tallest horse ever recorded, by 1850 measuring 219.7 centimetres (7 ft 2.5 in) or 21.2½ hands in height. His peak weight was estimated at 3,360 pounds (1,520 kg), making him also the heaviest horse ever recorded.

== See also ==
- List of historical horses
