= Yearling (horse) =

Young horse of either sex that is between one and two years old

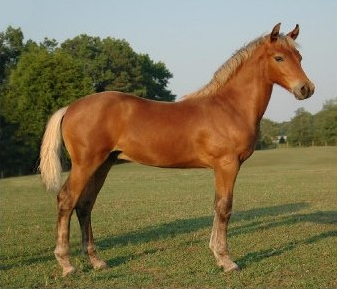
A yearling

A yearling is a young horse either male or female that is between one and two years old. Yearlings are comparable in development to a very early adolescent and are not fully mature physically. While they may be in the earliest stages of sexual maturity, they are considered too young to be breeding stock.

Yearlings may be further defined by sex, using the term "colt" to describe any male horse under age four, and "filly" for any female under four.

== Development and training ==
Generally, the training of yearlings consists of basic gentling on the ground; most are too young to be ridden or driven. Yearlings are often full of energy and quite unpredictable. Even though they are not fully mature, they are heavier and stronger than a human and require knowledgeable handling. Many colts who are not going to be used as breeding stallions are gelded at this age—in part to improve their behavior.

Under ideal conditions, a yearling will have already been trained as a suckling or weanling foal to lead, to have its hooves handled, to be groomed, clipped, blanketed and loaded into a horse trailer. If these tasks have not been accomplished, the yearling year is a time they are often done, in part to get the horse used to human handling before it reaches its full adult strength.

Other than basic gentling, training and management of yearlings has many areas of dispute, mainly because some yearlings look very mature and strong, even though they do not yet have the skeletal structure to support hard work. Yearlings grow at different rates and some horse breeds mature faster than others. For example, some people teach longeing or roundpenning to yearlings, others avoid it, arguing that work in small circles stresses the joints of the young horse, which are still "soft," and not fully developed. Thoroughbred and American Quarter Horse race horses are often "backed", or put under saddle, during the autumn of their yearling year, after the age of 18 months, though the riders are generally very light in weight and the young horses are not actually raced at this age. Likewise, some draft horse breeds and yearling Standardbreds are introduced to a harness and the concept of pulling an object, though they are not asked to handle any significant amount of weight. Conversely, trainers of breeds such as the Lipizzan do not even consider putting a young horse under saddle until it is four years old.

Some breeding farms tend to leave yearlings alone to grow in pastures and natural settings, others keep them stabled and condition them intensively for show or sale. For business purposes, the yearling year is considered a good time for breeders to sell young horses. One of the most famous horse auctions in the world is the Keeneland yearling sale in Kentucky, where young Thoroughbred yearlings are put up for sale to the highest bidder, generally selling for prices in the five and six figures, but sometimes bringing prices in the millions.

The world of halter exhibition is another area of controversy. Because larger, more mature yearlings place better in halter (or in-hand) classes at horse shows, and hence sell sooner and for better prices, there is a temptation to over-feed young horses and provide supplemental products, such as steroids, to promote rapid growth. Such practices may have long-term health implications for the future athletic career of the young animal and may put it at risk for growth disorders.

== See also ==
- Weanling
- Horse breeding
- Horse training
- Equine nutrition

== Sources ==
- Lyons, John and Jennifer J. Denison. Bringing Up Baby. Primedia Enthusiast Publications, 2002. ISBN 1-929164-12-2. Describes methods of training a young horse from birth up until it is old enough to ride.
