= Bird feet and legs =

Hindlimbs primarily used for the anchoring and locomotion of avians

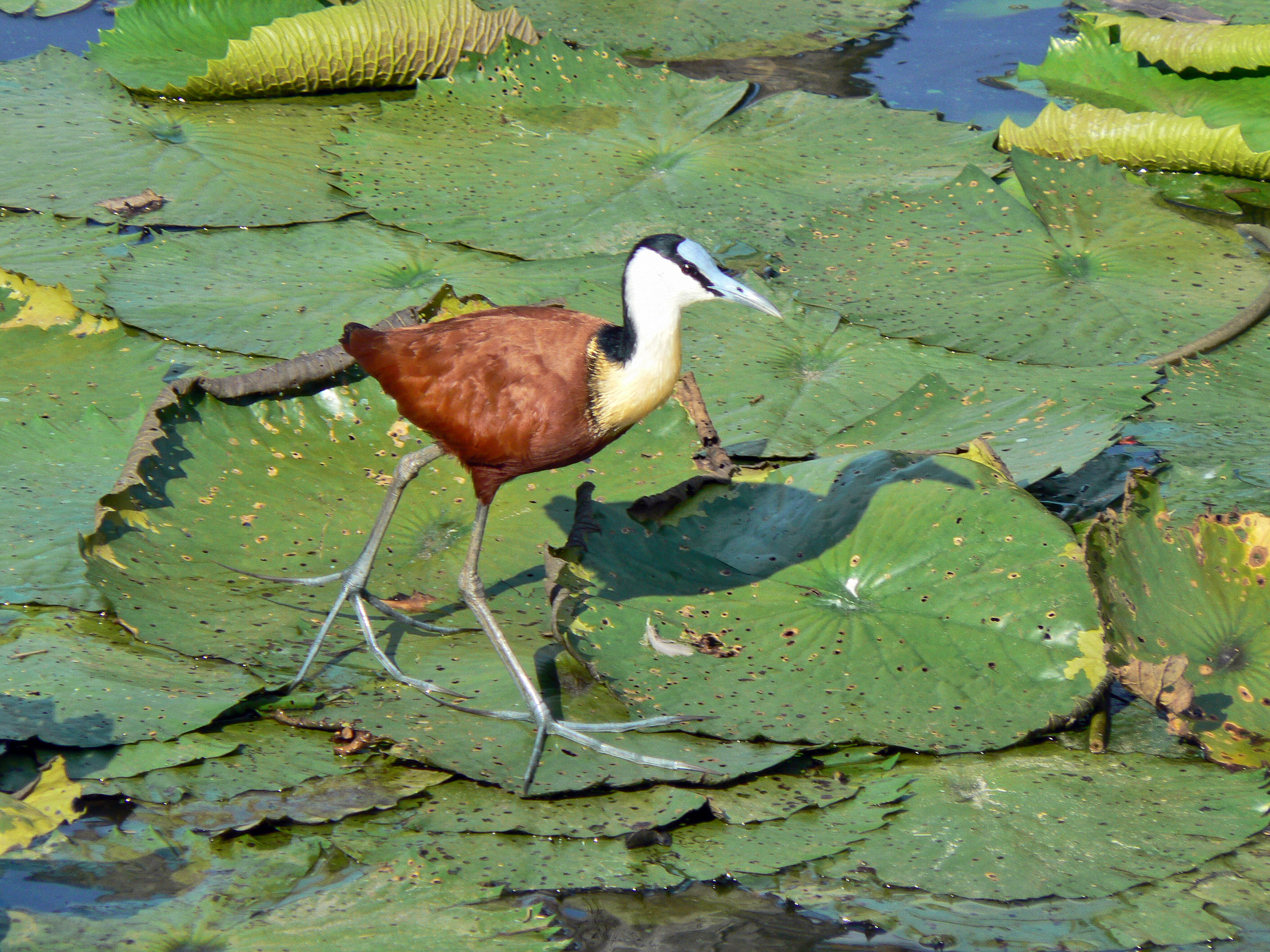
African jacana. Extremely long toes and claws help distribute the jacana's weight over a wide area to allow it to walk on floating leaves.

The anatomy of bird legs and feet is diverse, encompassing many accommodations to perform a wide variety of functions.

Most birds are classified as digitigrade animals, meaning they walk on their toes rather than the entire foot. Some of the lower bones of the foot (the distals and most of the metatarsal) are fused to form the tarsometatarsus – a third segment of the leg, specific to birds. The upper bones of the foot (proximals), in turn, are fused with the tibia to form the tibiotarsus, as over time the centralia disappeared. The fibula also reduced.

The legs are attached to a strong assembly consisting of the pelvic girdle extensively fused with the uniform spinal bone (also specific to birds) called the synsacrum, built from some of the fused bones.

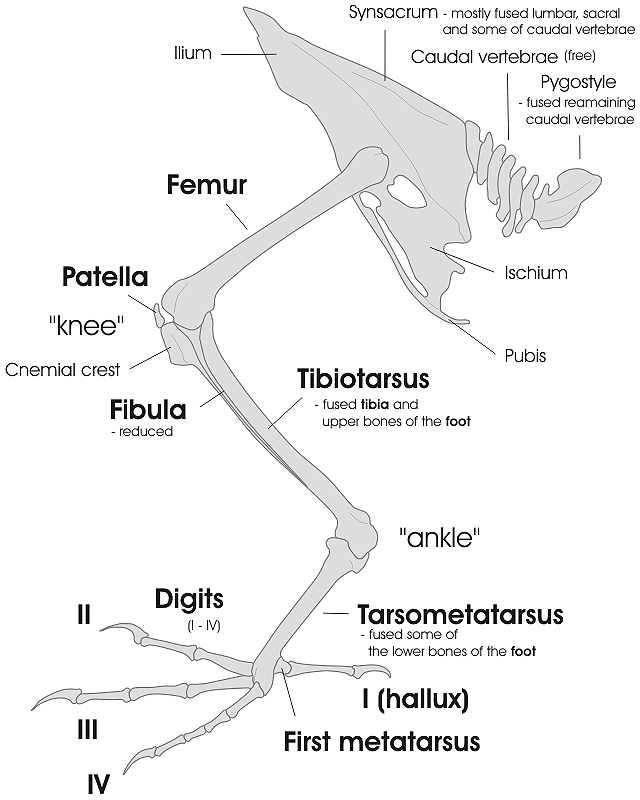
Bird left leg and pelvic girdle skeleton

== Hindlimbs ==
Birds are generally digitigrade animals (toe-walkers), which affects the structure of their leg skeleton. They use only their hindlimbs to walk (bipedalism). Their forelimbs evolved to become wings. Most bones of the avian foot (excluding toes) are fused together or with other bones, having changed their function over time.

=== Tarsometatarsus ===
Some lower bones of the foot are fused to form the tarsometatarsus – a third segment of the leg specific to birds. It consists of merged distals and metatarsals II, III and IV. Metatarsus I remains separated as a base of the first toe. The tarsometatarsus is the extended foot area, which gives the leg extra lever length.

=== Tibiotarsus ===
The foot's upper bones (proximals) are fused with the tibia to form the tibiotarsus, while the centralia are absent. The anterior (frontal) side of the dorsal end of the tibiotarsus (at the knee) contains a protruding enlargement called the cnemial crest.

=== Patella ===
At the knee above the cnemial crest is the patella (kneecap). Some species do not have patellas, sometimes only a cnemial crest. In grebes both a normal patella and an extension of the cnemial crest are found.

=== Fibula ===
The fibula is reduced and adheres extensively to the tibia, usually reaching two-thirds of its length. Only penguins have full-length fibulae.

=== Knee and ankle ===
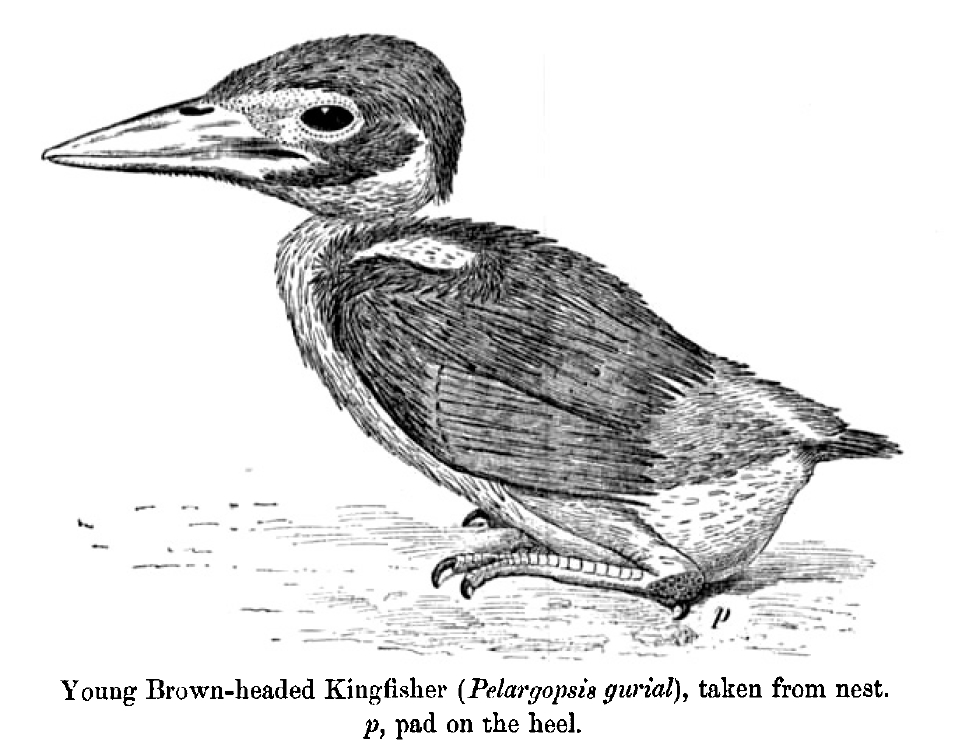
Chick of Pelargopsis capensis with heel-pads

The bird knee joint between the femur and tibia (or rather tibiotarsus) points forwards, but is hidden within the feathers. The backward-pointing "heel" (ankle) that is easily visible is a joint between the tibiotarsus and tarsometatarsus. The joint inside the tarsus occurs also in some reptiles. It is worth noting here that the name "thick knee" of the members of the family Burhinidae is a misnomer because their heels are large.

The chicks in the orders Coraciiformes and Piciformes have ankles covered by a patch of tough skins with tubercles known as the heel-pad. They use the heel-pad to shuffle inside the nest cavities or holes.

=== Toes and unfused metatarsals ===
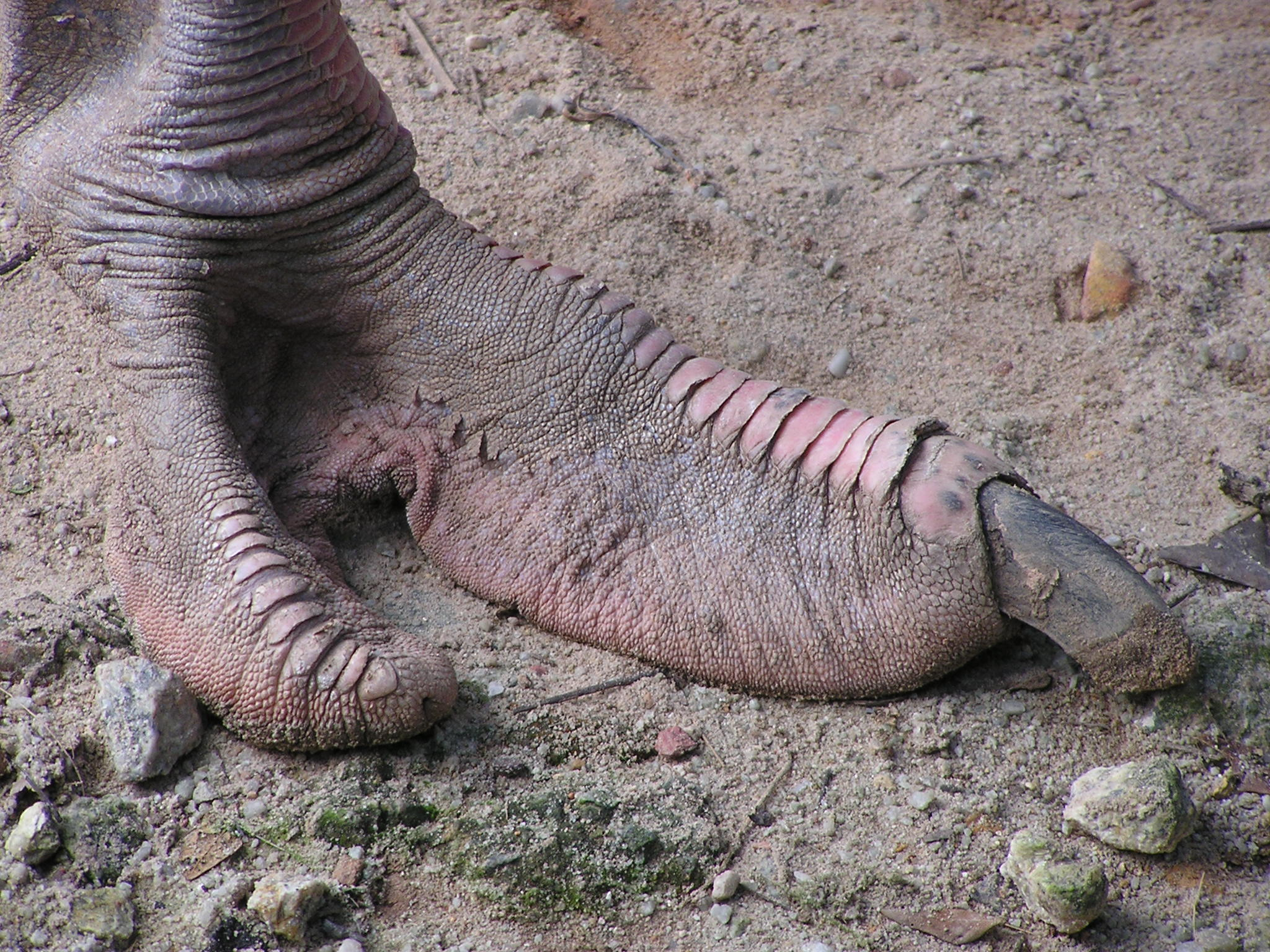
The ostrich is the only bird that has the didactyl foot.

Most birds have four toes, typically three facing forward and one pointing backward. In a typical perching bird, they consist respectively of 3, 4, 5 and 2 phalanges. Some birds, like the sanderling, have only the forward-facing toes; these are called tridactyl feet while the ostrich have only two toes (didactyl feet). The first digit, called the hallux, is homologous to the human big toe.

The claws are located on the extreme phalanx of each toe. They consist of a horny keratinous podotheca, or sheath, and are not part of the skeleton.

The bird foot also contains one or two metatarsals not fused in the tarsometatarsus.

== Pelvic girdle and synsacrum ==
The legs are attached to a very strong, lightweight assembly consisting of the pelvic girdle extensively fused with the uniform spinal bone called the synsacrum, which is specific to birds. The synsacrum is built from the lumbar fused with the sacral, some of the first sections of the caudal, and sometimes the last one or two sections of the thoracic vertebrae, depending on species (birds have altogether between 10 and 22 vertebrae). Except for those of ostriches and rheas, pubic bones do not connect to each other, easing egg-laying.

== Rigidity and reduction of mass ==
Fusions of individual bones into strong, rigid structures are characteristic.

Most major bird bones are extensively pneumatized. They contain many air pockets connected to the pulmonary air sacs of the respiratory system. Their spongy interior makes them strong relative to their mass. The number of pneumatic bones depends on the species; pneumaticity is slight or absent in diving birds. For example, in the long-tailed duck, the leg and wing bones are not pneumatic, in contrast with some of the other bones, while loons and puffins have even more massive skeletons with no aired bones. The flightless ostrich and emu have pneumatic femurs, and so far this is the only known pneumatic bone in these birds except for the ostrich's cervical vertebrae.

Fusions (leading to rigidity) and pneumatic bones (leading to reduced mass) are some of the many adaptations of birds for flight.

== Plantigrade locomotion ==
Most birds, except loons and grebes, are digitigrade, not plantigrade. Also, chicks in the nest can use the entire foot (toes and tarsometatarsus) with the heel on the ground.

Loons tend to walk this way because their legs and pelvis are highly specialized for swimming. They have a narrow pelvis, which moves the attachment point of the femur to the rear, and their tibiotarsus is much longer than the femur. This shifts the feet (toes) behind the center of mass of the loon body. They walk usually by pushing themselves on their breasts; larger loons cannot take off from land. This position, however, is highly suitable for swimming because their feet are located at the rear like the propeller on a motorboat.

Grebes and many other waterfowl have shorter femur and a more or less narrow pelvis, too, which gives the impression that their legs are attached to the rear as in loons.

== Functions ==
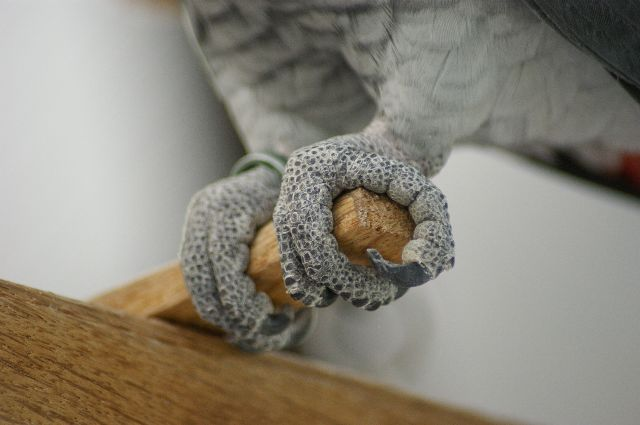
Grey parrot grips the perch with zygodactyl feet.

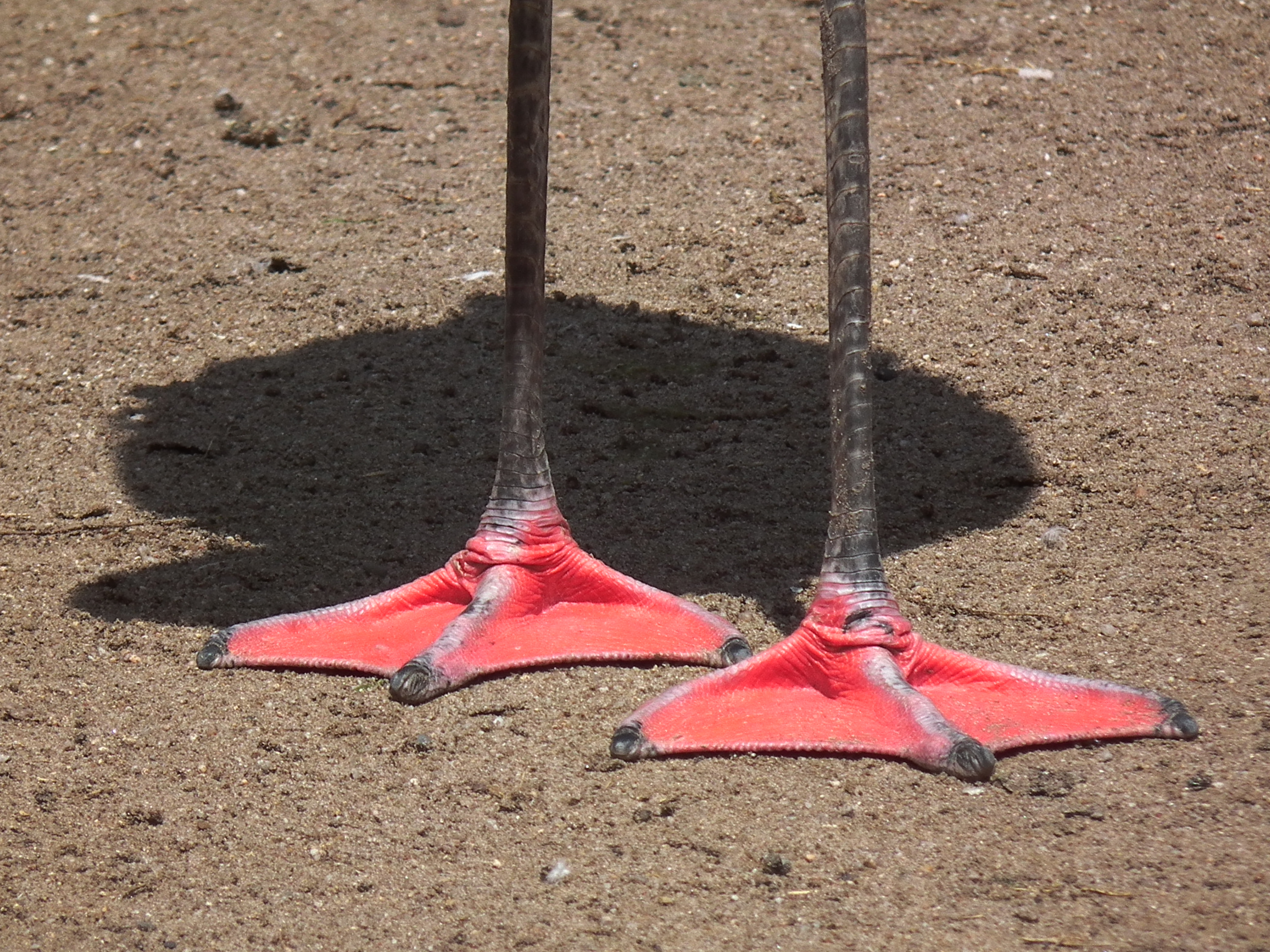
Palmate feet – Chilean flamingo.

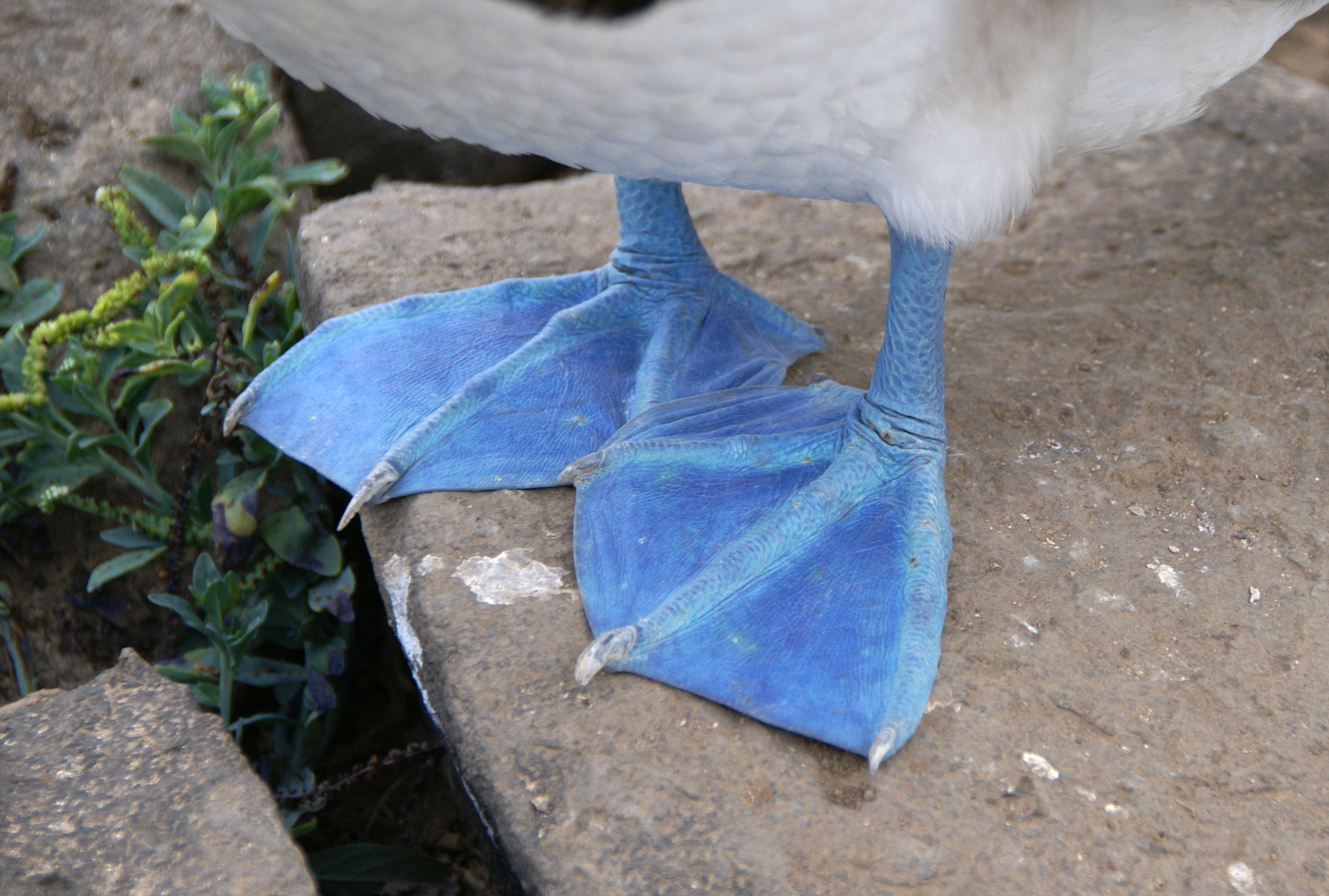
Totipalmate feet – blue-footed booby.

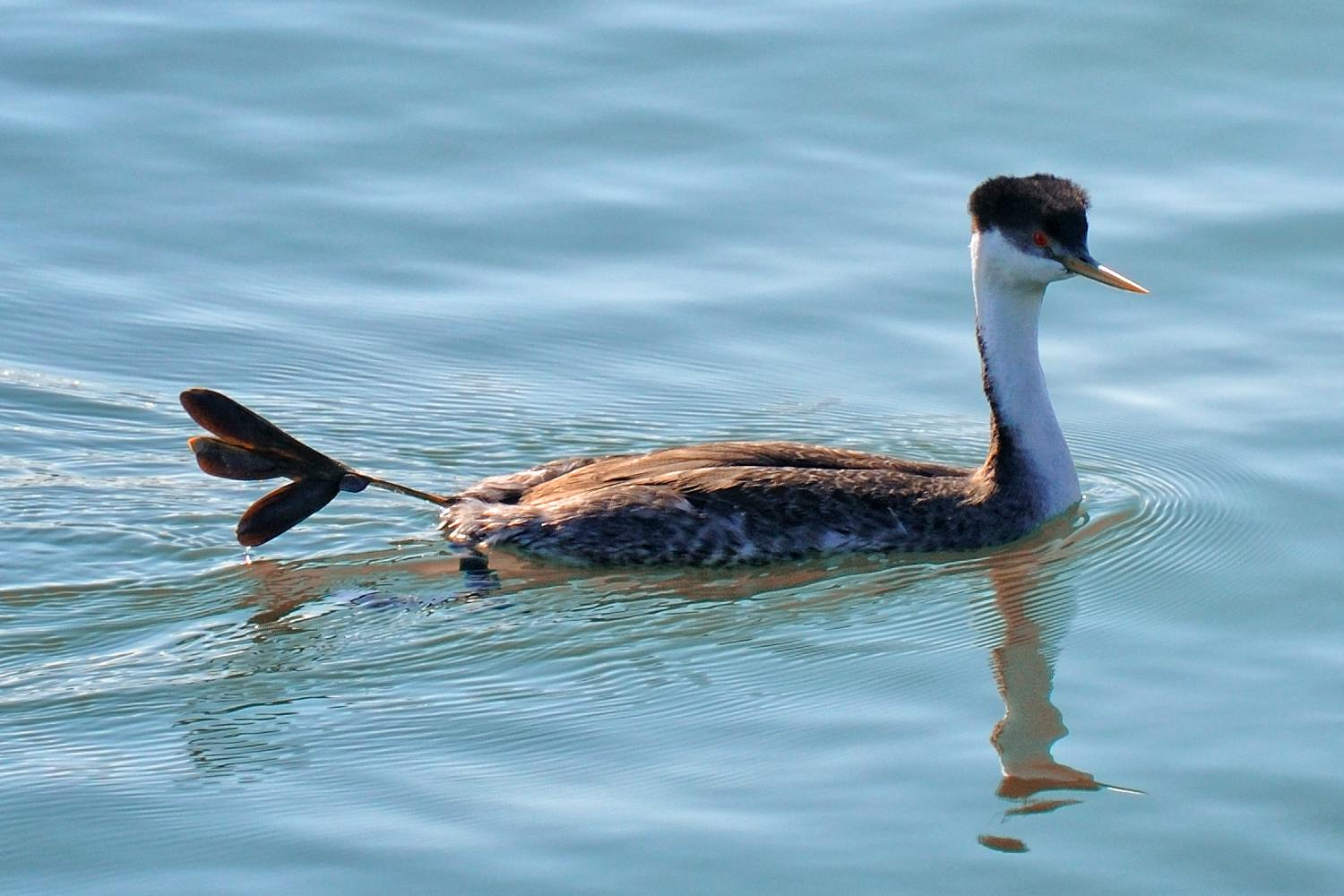
Western grebe presenting a lobate foot.

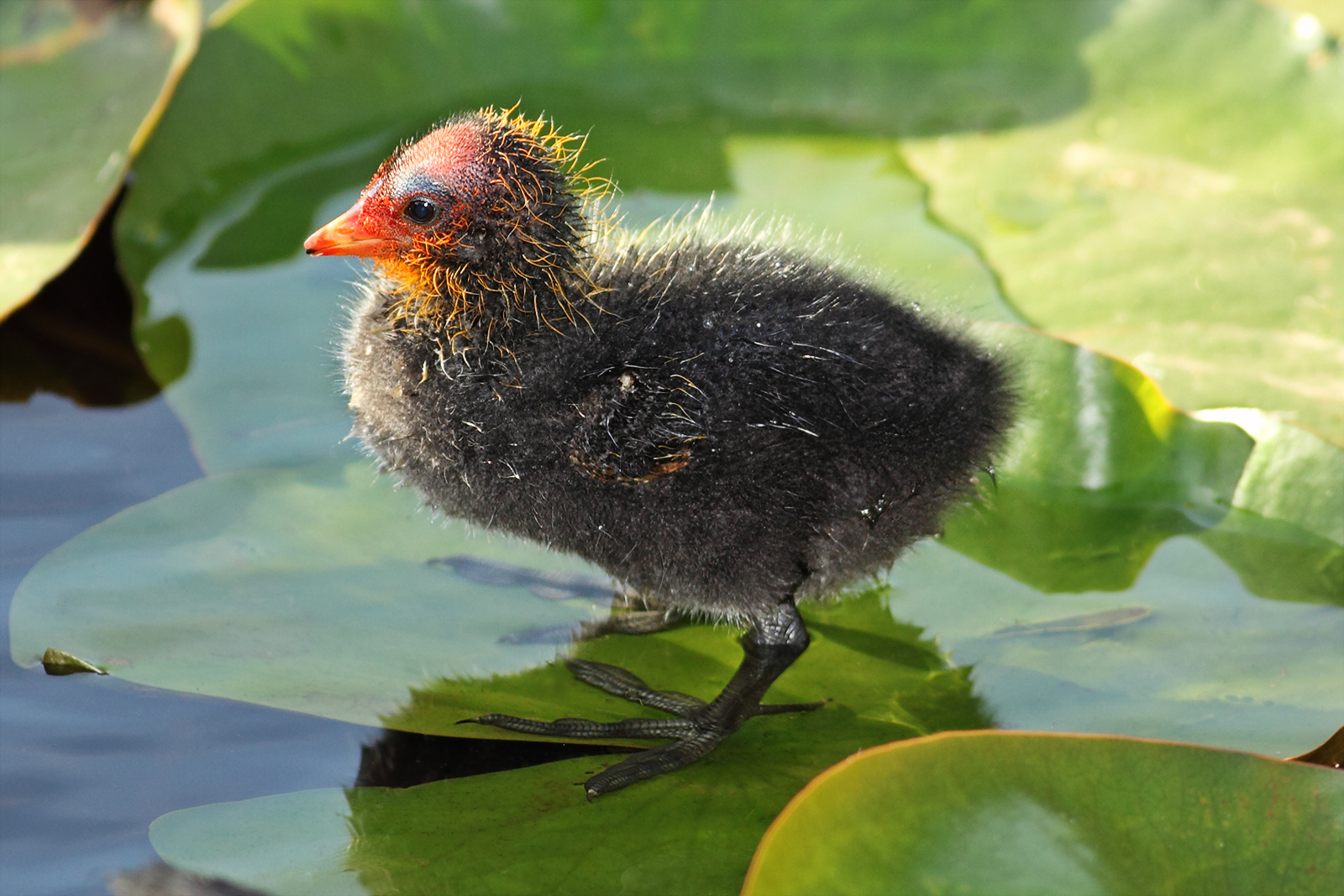
Lobate feet – a chick of the Eurasian coot.

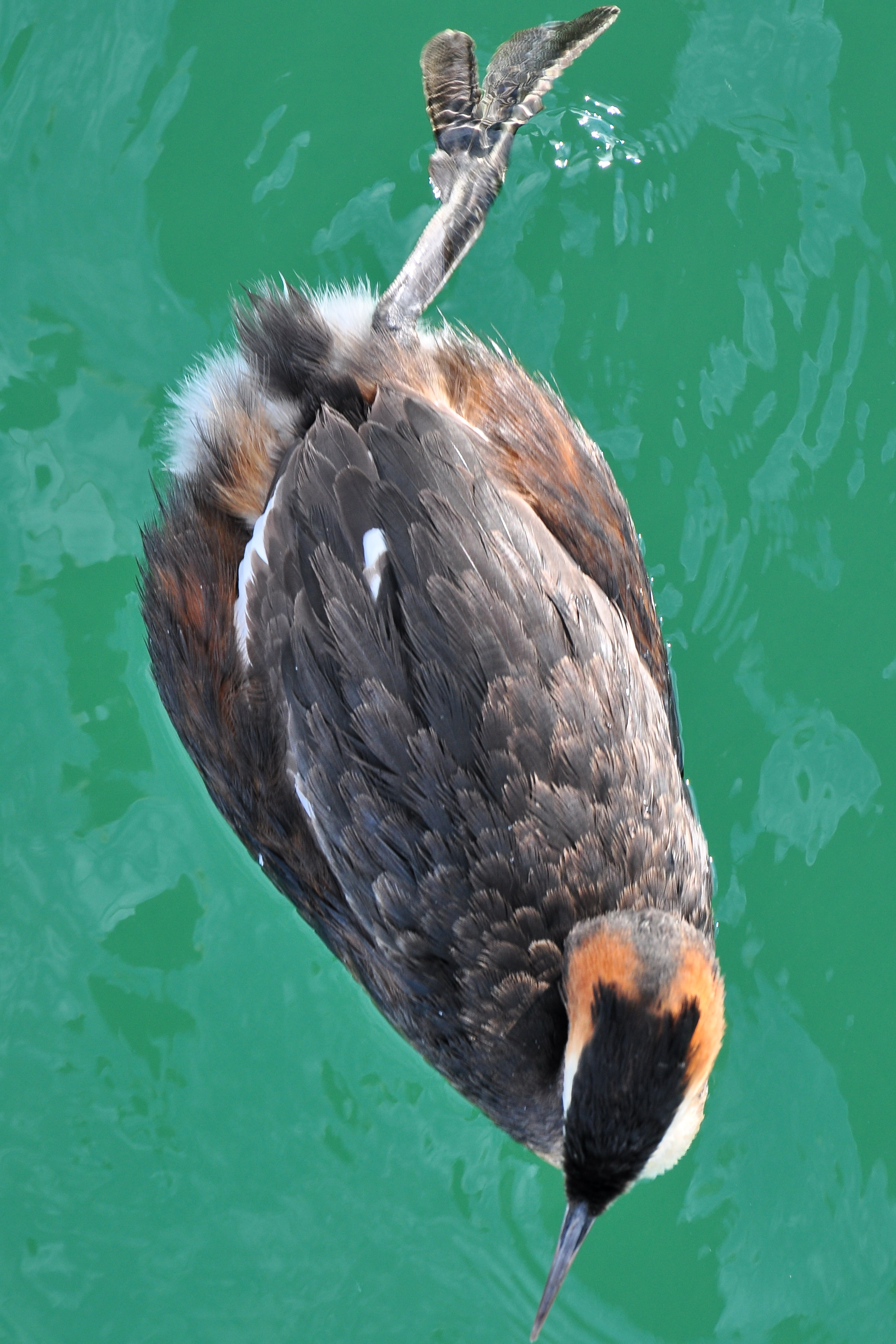
The great crested grebe. The feet in loons and grebes are placed far at the rear of the body - a powerful accommodation to swimming underwater, but a handicap for walking.

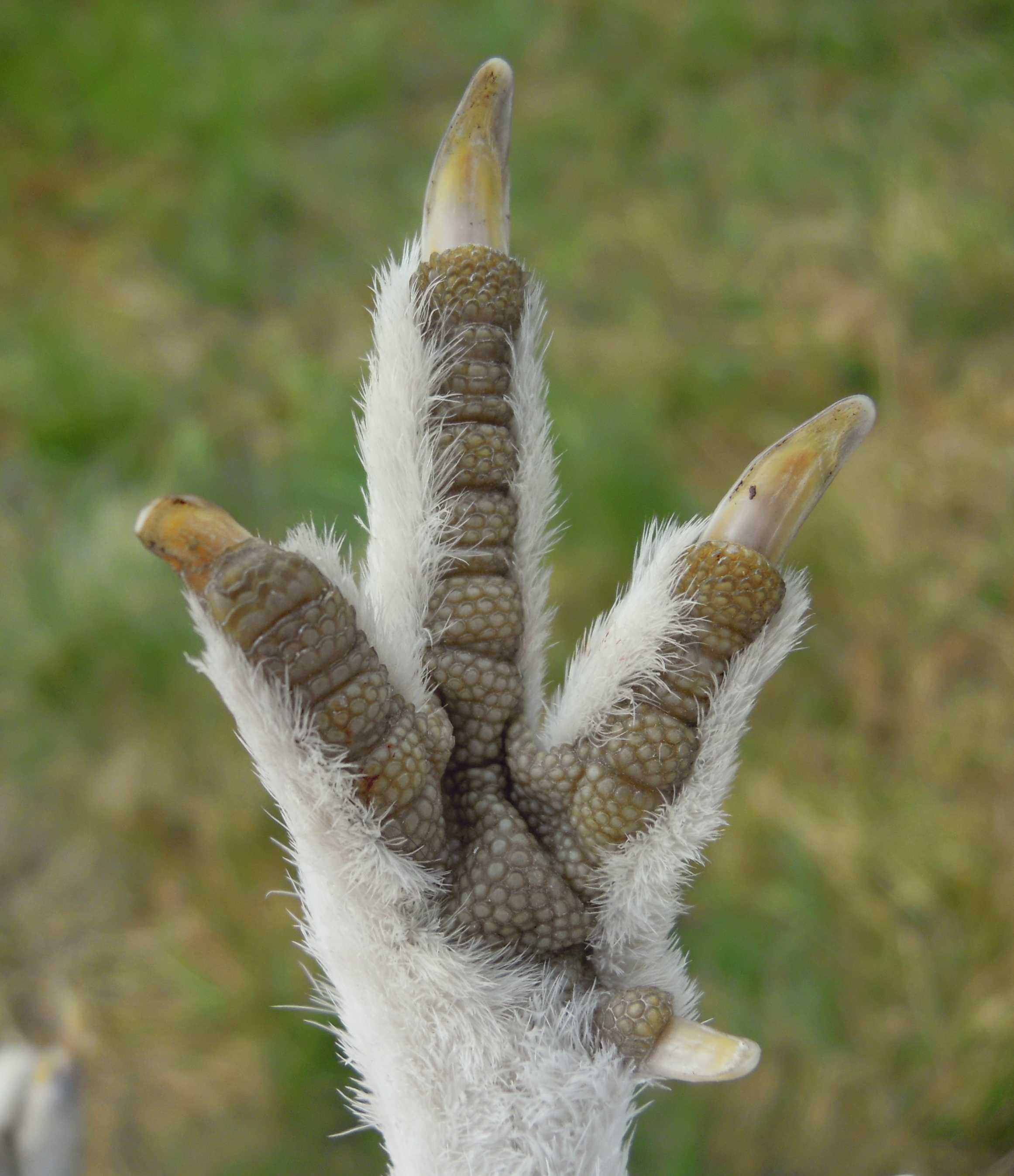
The snowshoe-like foot of the willow ptarmigan is an adaptation for walking on snow.

Because avian forelimbs are wings, many forelimb functions are performed by the bill and hindlimbs. It has been proposed that the hindlimbs are important in flight as accelerators when taking-off. Some leg and foot functions, including conventional ones and those specific to birds, are:

- Locomotion
  - Walking, running (ostriches, grouse, wild turkeys) hopping, climbing (woodpeckers, nuthatches, treecreepers)
  - Swimming and steering underwater (ducks, grebes, loons)
- Perching (as on a branch) or clinging
- Carrying (like ospreys holding fish)
- Flight-related
  - Serving probably as the primary take-off accelerator. In the common vampire bat, by contrast, the required force is generated by the wing.
  - Absorbing the shock of landing on a perch and on the water, becoming "water skis"
- Feeding and related
  - Catching and killing prey in raptors (hawks, owls)
  - Holding (used like hands in parrots) and pulling apart food (with help from the bill)
  - Scratching the ground in search of food
    - Double scratch: hopping forward and then backward using both feet to scratch (often towhees, sparrows, juncos)
    - One-footed scratch (grouse, quails, wild turkeys, domestic chicken)
- Reproduction and related
  - Cradling and turning eggs during incubation. Birds lacking a brood patch incubate the eggs with their feet – grasping one or even two of them (gannets, boobies) or keeping them on the top surfaces of their feet (penguins under a pouch of belly skin, murres).
  - Courtship (sage grouse), including aerial courtship (bald eagles)
  - Building nests (with help from the bill)
- Preening and cleaning. Sometimes birds use a special claw (for example, barn owls have a so-called "feather comb"). Some herons and nightjars use the claw for cleaning the head.
- Heat loss regulation (herons, gulls, giant petrels, storks, New World vultures, ducks, geese)

== Toe arrangements ==
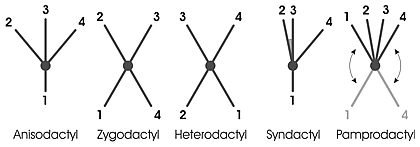
Toe arrangement in a bird's right foot

Typical toe arrangements in birds are:

- Anisodactyl: three toes in front (2, 3, 4), and one in back (1); in nearly all songbirds and most other perching birds.
- Zygodactyl: two toes in front (2, 3) and two in back (1, 4) – the outermost front toe (4) is reversed. The zygodactyl arrangement is a case of convergence, because it evolved in birds in different ways nine times.
  - In many perching birds – most woodpeckers and their allies, ospreys, owls, cuckoos (including roadrunners), most parrots, mousebirds, some swifts and cuckoo rollers.
    - Woodpeckers, when climbing, can rotate the outer rear digit (4) to the side in an ectropodactyl arrangement. Black-backed woodpeckers, Eurasian three-toed woodpeckers and American three-toed woodpeckers have three toes – the inner rear (1) is missing and the outer rear (4) points always backward and never rotates.
    - Owls, ospreys and turacos can rotate the outer toe (4) back and forth.
- Heterodactyl: two toes in front (3, 4) and two in back (2, 1) – the inner front toe (2) is reversed; heterodactyl arrangement only exists in trogons.
- Syndactyl: three toes in front (2, 3, 4), one in back (1); the inner and middle (2, 3) are joined for much of their length. This is often found in Picocoraciae, though rollers, ground rollers, and Piciformes (who are zygodactyl) are exceptions.
- Pamprodactyl: two inner toes in front (2, 3), the two outer (1, 4) can rotate freely forward and backward. In mousebirds and some swifts. Some swifts move all four digits forward to use them as hooks to hang.

The most common arrangement is the anisodactyl foot, and second among perching birds is the zygodactyl arrangement.

== Claws ==
All birds have claws at the end of the toes. The claws are typically curved and the radius of curvature tends to be greater as the bird is larger although they tend to be straighter in large ground dwelling birds such as ratites. Some species (including nightjars, herons, frigatebirds, owls and pratincoles) have comb-like serrations on the claw of the middle toe that may aid in scratch preening.

== Webbing and lobation ==
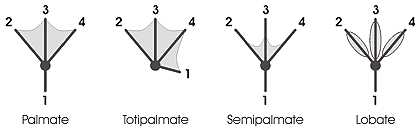
Webbing and lobation in a bird's right foot

Palmations and lobes enable swimming or help walking on loose ground such as mud. The webbed or palmated feet of birds can be categorized into several types:

- Palmate: only the anterior digits (2–4) are joined by webbing. Found in ducks, geese and swans, gulls and terns, and other aquatic birds (auks, flamingos, fulmars, jaegers, loons, petrels, shearwaters and skimmers). Diving ducks also have a lobed hind toe (1), and gulls, terns and allies have a reduced hind toe.
- Totipalmate: all four digits (1–4) are joined by webbing. Found in gannets and boobies, pelicans, cormorants, anhingas and frigatebirds. Some gannets have brightly colored feet used in display.
- Semipalmate: a small web between the anterior digits (2–4). Found in some plovers (Eurasian dotterels) and sandpipers (semipalmated sandpipers, stilt sandpipers, upland sandpipers, greater yellowlegs and willet), avocet, herons (only two toes), all grouse, and some domesticated breeds of chicken. Plovers and lapwings have a vestigial hind toe (1), and sandpipers and their allies have a reduced and raised hind toe barely touching the ground. The sanderling is the only sandpiper having 3 toes (tridactyl foot).
- Lobate: the anterior digits (2–4) are edged with lobes of skin. Lobes expand or contract when a bird swims. In grebes, coots, phalaropes, finfoots and some palmate-footed ducks on the hallux (1). Grebes have more webbing between the toes than coots and phalaropes.

The palmate foot is most common.

== Thermal regulation ==
Some birds like gulls, herons, ducks or geese can regulate their temperature through their feet.

The arteries and veins intertwine in the legs, so heat can be transferred from arteries back to veins before reaching the feet. Such a mechanism is called countercurrent exchange. Gulls can open a shunt between these vessels, turning back the bloodstream above the foot, and constrict the vessels in the foot. This reduces heat loss by more than 90 percent. In gulls, the temperature of the base of the leg is 32 °C (89 °F), while that of the foot may be close to 0 °C (32 °F).

However, for cooling, this heat-exchange network can be bypassed and blood-flow through the foot significantly increased (giant petrels). Some birds also excrete onto their feet, increasing heat loss via evaporation (storks, New World vultures).

== See also ==
- Bird anatomy
- Dactyly
- Synsacrum
- Tarsometatarsus
- Tibiotarsus
