= Corkscrew claw syndrome =

Corkscrew claw syndrome is the combination of corkscrew deformities in heifers of the medial claws of both the rear and front feet that causes permanent damage to the pedal bone.
