= Skeletal system of the horse =

Skeleton of a horse

The skeletal system of the horse has three major functions in the body. It protects vital organs, provides framework, and supports soft parts of the body. Horses typically have 205 bones. The pelvic limb typically contains 19 bones, while the thoracic limb contains 20 bones.

== Functions of bones ==
Bones serve four major functions in the skeletal system; they act as levers, they help the body hold shape and structure, they store minerals, and they are the site of red and white blood cell formation. Bones can be classified into five categories

1. Long bones: aid in locomotion, store minerals, and act as levers. They are found mainly in the limbs.
2. Short bones: Absorb concussion. Found in joints such as the knee, hock, and fetlock.
3. Flat bones: Enclose body cavities containing organs. The ribs are examples of flat bones.
4. Irregular bones: Protect the central nervous system. The vertebral column consists of irregular bones.
5. Sesamoid bones: Bones embedded within a tendon. The horse's proximal digital sesamoids are simply called the "sesamoid bones" by horsemen, its distal digital sesamoid is referred to as the navicular bone.

Ligaments and tendons hold the skeletal system together. Ligaments hold bones to bones and tendons hold bones to muscles. Synovial membranes are found in joint capsules, where they contain synovial fluid, which lubricates joints. Bones are covered by a tough membrane called periosteum, which covers the entire bone excluding areas of articulation.

Horse and human skeleton
The horse on the left (side view), the human on the right (front view), roughly to the same scale. Hover over a number or a list item to compare the two skeletons.
1Skull
The horse's skull is long: the facial bones are about twice as long as the braincase, and the large jaws hold 36–44 teeth for grinding grass. The eye sockets sit on the sides of the head, giving an almost all-round field of view. There is a toothless gap between the incisors and molars, where the bit rests. The human skull is round, protects a large brain, the face is flat, and the eyes face forward.
2Spine
Both species have 7 neck vertebrae, like almost all mammals, though the horse's are much longer. The horse's spine is horizontal, like a bridge, suspending the body's weight between its four legs: it has 18 thoracic vertebrae, 6 lumbar vertebrae, 5 sacral vertebrae, and 15–21 caudal (tail) vertebrae. The human spine is vertical and S-shaped, with 33 vertebrae (7, 12, 5, 5, and 3–5), and has no tail — only a small coccyx.
3Rib cage
The horse has 18 pairs of ribs (8 attached to the sternum and 10 not), the human has 12 (7 true, 3 false, and 2 floating). The horse's rib cage is long, deep, and narrow from side to side, to protect large lungs and part of the digestive system; the sternum resembles the keel of a boat. The human rib cage, by contrast, is wider than it is deep, suited to standing upright.
4Shoulder
The horse has no collarbone: the scapula lies against the side of the rib cage, and the forelegs are attached to the trunk only by muscles and ligaments. This allows a longer stride and cushions impacts with the ground. The human collarbone links the scapula to the sternum, letting the arm move in every direction: to climb, to throw, or to use the hands in front of the body.
5Pelvis
The horse's pelvis is long and set at a slant, almost parallel to the spine. It transmits the thrust of the hind legs to the spine through the sacrum — the horse's "engine" is at the rear. The human pelvis is short and wide, bowl-shaped; while standing, it supports the internal organs and helps keep the body balanced with every step.
6Foreleg
The horse's forearm bones, the radius and ulna, are fused together: unlike a human, a horse cannot rotate its "hand", so the leg only moves back and forth. What looks like the horse's "knee" is actually the human wrist, made up of the carpal bones, while the humerus is hidden inside the body. The forelegs bear around 60% of the body's weight.
7Hind leg
The horse's femur is short and thick, embedded among the body's muscles. The true knee sits close to the belly, where the patella can lock in place, letting the horse sleep standing without tiring. The fibula has almost disappeared and fused to the tibia. What is called the horse's "hock" corresponds to the human ankle and heel: the backward-pointing point is the calcaneus, the human heel bone.
8Hands, feet, and hooves
Humans have five digits on each hand and foot, and walk on the whole sole of the foot. The horse, by contrast, walks on the tip of a single digit: the third one. The "cannon bone" is the third metacarpal or metatarsal, and all that remains of the second and fourth digits are two thin splint-bone remnants. The digit's three phalanges are the long pastern bone, the short pastern bone, and the coffin bone; the last of these sits inside the hoof, where the human fingernail would be. The joint wrongly called the horse's "ankle" is, in fact, the human knuckle.
1
Skull
The horse's skull is long: the facial bones are about twice as long as the braincase, and the large jaws hold 36–44 teeth for grinding grass. The eye sockets sit on the sides of the head, giving an almost all-round field of view. There is a toothless gap between the incisors and molars, where the bit rests. The human skull is round, protects a large brain, the face is flat, and the eyes face forward.
2
Spine
Both species have 7 neck vertebrae, like almost all mammals, though the horse's are much longer. The horse's spine is horizontal, like a bridge, suspending the body's weight between its four legs: it has 18 thoracic vertebrae, 6 lumbar vertebrae, 5 sacral vertebrae, and 15–21 caudal (tail) vertebrae. The human spine is vertical and S-shaped, with 33 vertebrae (7, 12, 5, 5, and 3–5), and has no tail — only a small coccyx.
3
Rib cage
The horse has 18 pairs of ribs (8 attached to the sternum and 10 not), the human has 12 (7 true, 3 false, and 2 floating). The horse's rib cage is long, deep, and narrow from side to side, to protect large lungs and part of the digestive system; the sternum resembles the keel of a boat. The human rib cage, by contrast, is wider than it is deep, suited to standing upright.
4
Shoulder
The horse has no collarbone: the scapula lies against the side of the rib cage, and the forelegs are attached to the trunk only by muscles and ligaments. This allows a longer stride and cushions impacts with the ground. The human collarbone links the scapula to the sternum, letting the arm move in every direction: to climb, to throw, or to use the hands in front of the body.
5
Pelvis
The horse's pelvis is long and set at a slant, almost parallel to the spine. It transmits the thrust of the hind legs to the spine through the sacrum — the horse's "engine" is at the rear. The human pelvis is short and wide, bowl-shaped; while standing, it supports the internal organs and helps keep the body balanced with every step.
6
Foreleg
The horse's forearm bones, the radius and ulna, are fused together: unlike a human, a horse cannot rotate its "hand", so the leg only moves back and forth. What looks like the horse's "knee" is actually the human wrist, made up of the carpal bones, while the humerus is hidden inside the body. The forelegs bear around 60% of the body's weight.
7
Hind leg
The horse's femur is short and thick, embedded among the body's muscles. The true knee sits close to the belly, where the patella can lock in place, letting the horse sleep standing without tiring. The fibula has almost disappeared and fused to the tibia. What is called the horse's "hock" corresponds to the human ankle and heel: the backward-pointing point is the calcaneus, the human heel bone.
8
Hands, feet, and hooves
Humans have five digits on each hand and foot, and walk on the whole sole of the foot. The horse, by contrast, walks on the tip of a single digit: the third one. The "cannon bone" is the third metacarpal or metatarsal, and all that remains of the second and fourth digits are two thin splint-bone remnants. The digit's three phalanges are the long pastern bone, the short pastern bone, and the coffin bone; the last of these sits inside the hoof, where the human fingernail would be. The joint wrongly called the horse's "ankle" is, in fact, the human knuckle.
Image credits

== Ligaments ==
Ligaments attach bone to bone or bone to tendon, and are vital in stabilizing joints as well as supporting structures. They are made up of fibrous material that is generally quite strong. Due to their relatively poor blood supply, ligament injuries generally take a long time to heal.

Ligaments of the upper body include:

- Nuchal and supraspinous ligaments: the nuchal ligament is composed of strong elastic tissue originating from the occipital protuberance of the skull (the poll) and extending to the withers. The main (funicular) portion has attachments on the second cervical vertebra, and the flattened fanlike (lamellar) section has bands extending to the third through at least 5th cervical vertebrae, each getting smaller, with attachments less commonly found on the sixth and seventh cervical vertebrae. After attaching caudally at the withers, the nuchal ligament continues as the supraspinous ligament, attaching to each of the subsequent thoracic and lumbar vertebrae. Its main purpose is to support the head and allow it to be moved upward or downward.
- Intercapital ligaments: lie between the first through eleventh ribs. Help to prevent thoracic disk herniation.
- Sacrosciatic ligament: Originates from the sacrum and coccygeal vertebrae, inserts into the pelvis.

Ligaments of the legs include:

- Suspensory ligament: runs from the back of the cannon bone (between the two splint bones), then splits into two branches and attaches to the sesamoid bones at the bottom of the fetlock. Branches continue downward and attach to the extensor tendons. The main purpose of the suspensory is to support the fetlock joint, preventing it from overextending. Injury to this ligament is an important cause of lameness in performance horses. The suspensory is a modified muscle, the equine equivalent of the interosseous muscle, which contains both tendon fibers and residual muscle fibers.
- Interosseous ligaments: connect the cannon bone to each splint bone. Injury to this ligament produces the condition known as "splints".
- Proximal and distal check ligaments: The proximal check ligament originates from the radius and attaches to the superficial digital flexor tendon. The distal check originates from the palmar carpal ligament and attaches to the deep digital flexor tendon, approximately 2/3-way down the metacarpus.
- Plantar ligament: in the hind leg, originates on the calcaneus, running down the lateral side of the tarsus, attaches to the 4th tarsal and 4th metatarsal bones. Injury leads to a condition known as "curb."
- Inter-sesamoidean ligament: supporting ligament connecting the two sesamoid bones.
- Distal sesamoidean ligaments: run from the sesamoid bones to the two pastern bones. Important in the stay apparatus as a functional continuation of the suspensory ligament.
- Impar ligament: runs between the navicular bone and the 3rd phalanx.
- Annular ligament: goes around the back of the fetlock, surrounding the flexor tendons and their tendon sheath, attaching to the sesamoid bones. It helps to support the fetlock, and provides an enclosed "pulley" for the flexor tendons to run through.
- Collateral ligaments: With the exception of the shoulder and hip, all joints in the fore and hind limbs have collateral ligaments which allow flexion in the sagittal plane, but prevent significant lateral-medial collateromotion, thereby stabilizing the joints. The collateral ligaments of the stifle allow for some rotational movement, and those of the distal interphalangeal joint allow for moderate collateromotion to allow for hoof contact on uneven surfaces.

== Axial skeleton ==
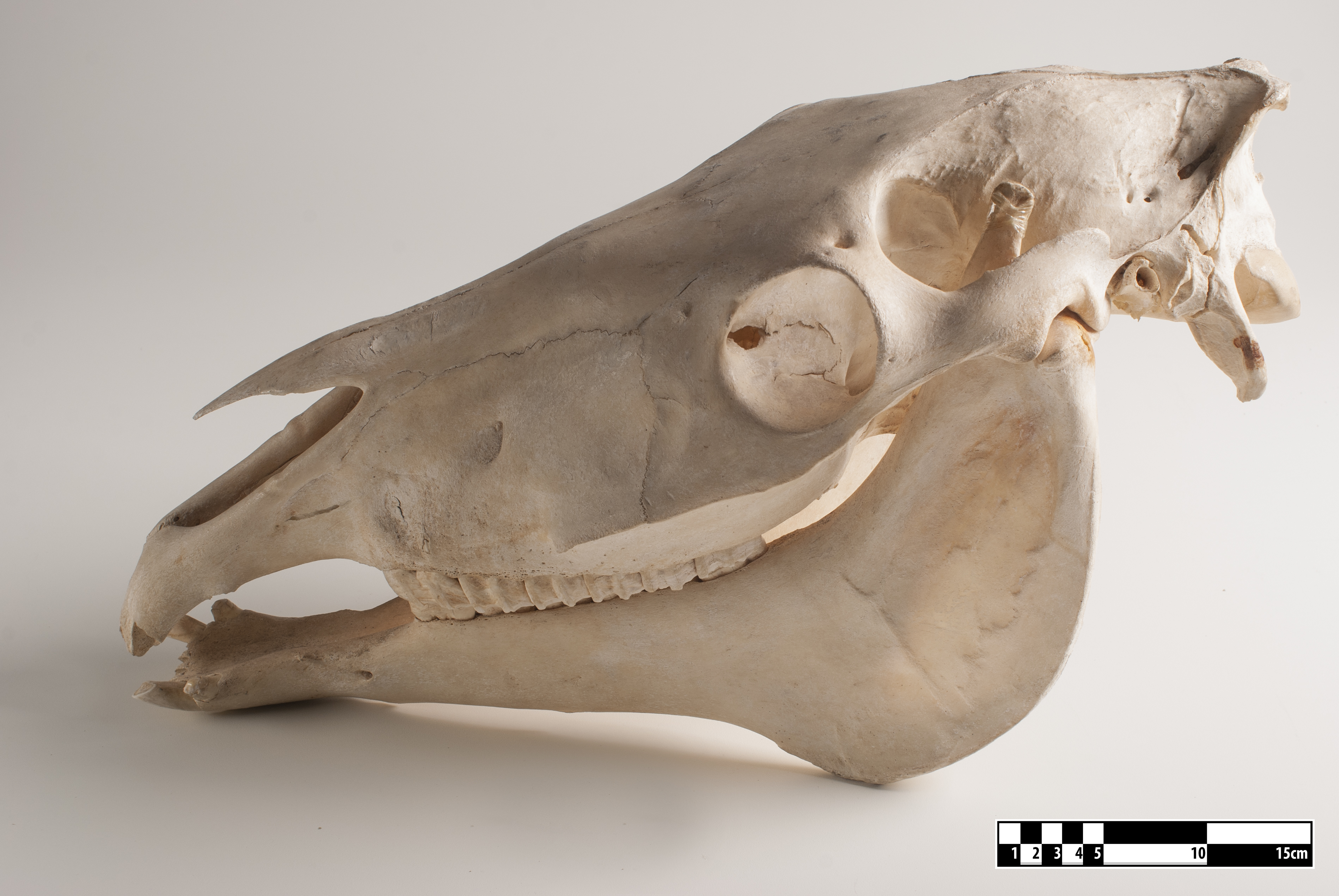
Horse Skull

The axial skeleton contains the skull, vertebral column, sternum, and ribs. The sternum consists of multiple sternebrae, which fuse to form one cartilagenous mass, attached to the 8 "true" pairs of ribs, out of a total of 18.

The vertebral column usually contains 54 bones: 7 cervical vertebrae, including the atlas (C1) and axis (C2) which support and help move the skull, 18 (or rarely, 19) thoracic, 5-6 lumbar, 5 sacral (which fuse together to form the sacrum), and 15-25 caudal vertebrae with an average of 18. Differences in number may occur, particularly in certain breeds. For example, some, though not all, Arabians, may have 5 lumbar vertebrae, opposed to the usual 6, 17 thoracic vertebrae (and ribs) instead of 18, and 16 or 17 caudal vertebrae instead of 18. The withers of the horse are made up by the dorsal spinal processes of the thoracic vertebrae numbers 5 to 9.

The skull consists of 34 bones and contains four cavities: the cranial cavity, the orbital cavity, oral, and the nasal cavity. The cranial cavity encloses and protects the brain and it supports several sense organs. The orbital cavitity surrounds and protects the eye. The oral cavity is a passageway into the respiratory and digestive systems. The nasal cavity leads into the respiratory system, and includes extensive paranasal sinuses. The nasal cavity contains turbinate bones that protect the mucous membrane that lines the cavity from warm inspired air. The skull consists of fourteen major bones

1. Incisive bone (premaxillary): part of the upper jaw; where the incisors attach
2. Nasal bones: cover the nasal cavity
3. Maxillary bones: large bones that contain the roots of the molars
4. Mandible: lower portion of the jaw; largest bone in the skull
5. Lacrimal bones: contains the nasolacrimal duct, which carries fluid from the surface of the eye, to the nose
6. Ethmoid bone: complex bone separating the nasal passages from the cranial vault
7. Frontal bone: creates the forehead of the horse
8. Parietal bones: extend from the forehead to the back of the skull
9. Occipital bone: forms the joint between the skull and the first vertebrae of the neck (the atlas)
10. Temporal bones: contain the eternal acoustic meatus, which transmits sound from the ear to the cochlea (eardrum)
11. Zygomatic bones: attach to the temporal bone to form the zygomatic arch (cheek bone)
12. Palatine bones: form the back of the hard palate
13. Sphenoid bone: formed by fusion of the foetal basisphenoid and presphenoid bones, at the base of the skull. Can become fractured in horses that rear over backwards.
14. Vomer: forms the top of the inside of the nasal cavity
15. Pterygoid bones: small bones attached to the sphenoid that extend downward

== Appendicular skeleton ==
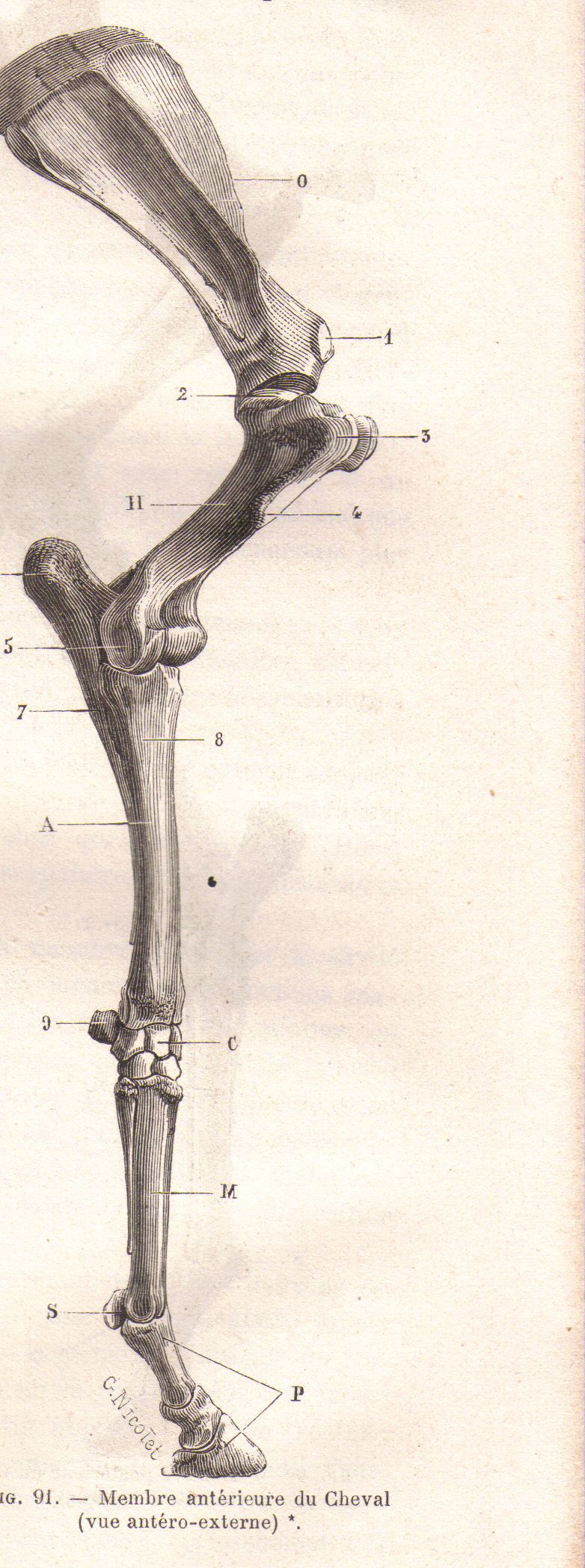
Appendicular forelimb skeleton

The appendicular skeleton contains the fore and hindlimbs. The hindlimb attaches to the vertebral column via the pelvis, while the forelimb does not directly attach to the spine (as a horse does not have a collar bone), and is instead suspended in place by muscles and tendons. This allows great mobility in the front limb, and is partially responsible for the horse's ability to fold its legs up when jumping. Although the hindlimb supports only about 40% of the weight of the animal, it creates most of the forward movement of the horse, and is stabilized through attachments to the spine.

=== Important bones and joints of the forelimb ===
- Scapula (shoulder blade): flat bone with a large area of cartilage that partially forms the withers. The shoulder length and angle is very important to horsemen when evaluating conformation.
- Humerus: lies between the scapula and the radius, making an angle of about 55 degrees down and back. (Misspelled in the picture as "Humercus")
- Radius: extends from the elbow, where it articulates with the humerus, and travels downward to the carpus. It forms the "forearm" of the horse along with the ulna.
- Ulna: caudal to the radius, it is fused to that bone in an adult horse.
- Shoulder joint (scapulohumeral joint): usually has an angle of 120-130 degrees when the horse is standing, which can extended to 145 degrees, and flexed to 80 degrees (such as when the horse is jumping an obstacle).
- Elbow joint (humeroradial joint): hinge joint that can flex 55-60 degrees.
- Carpus (knee): Analogous to the wrist in humans, consists of 7-8 bones placed in 2 rows to form 3 joints. The 1st carpal bone is present only 50% of the time.

=== Important bones and joints of the hindlimb ===
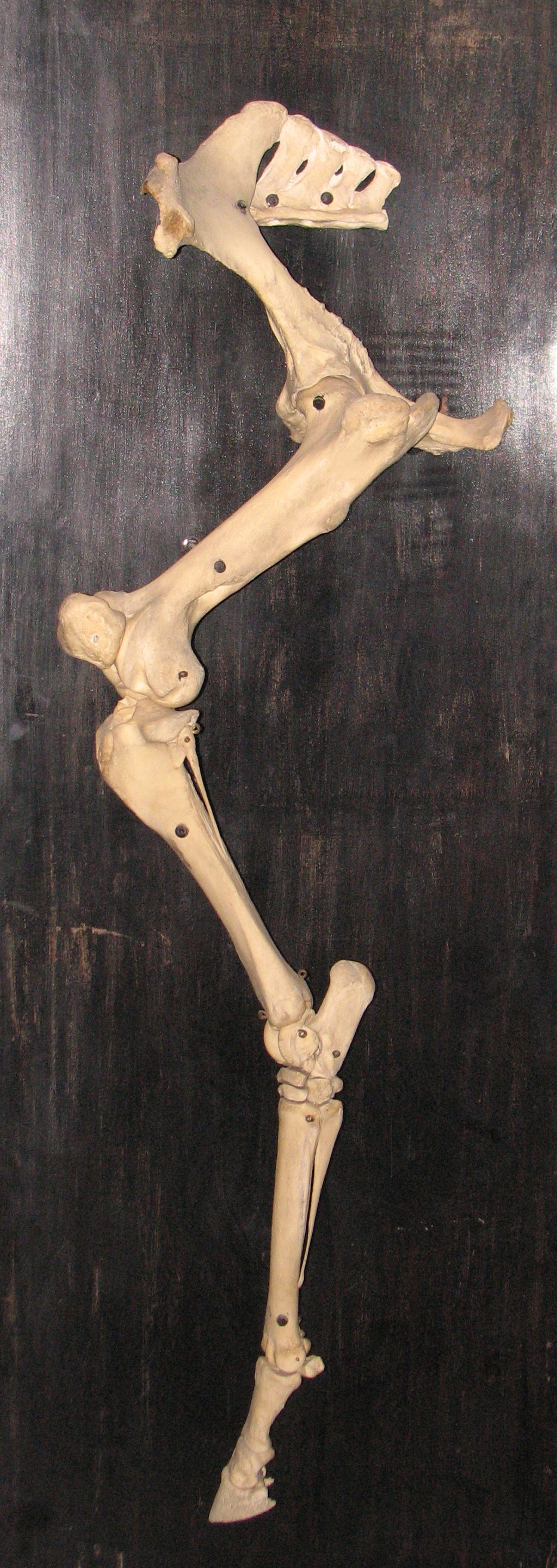
Appendicular hindlimb skeleton

- Pelvis: made up of the os coxae, the largest of the flat bones in a horse. It is made up of the ilium, the ischium, and the pubis. At the junction of these three bones is a cavity called the acetabulum, which acts as the socket of the hip joint. The pelvic cavity is larger in diameter in the mare than in the stallion, providing more room for the foal during birth.
- Femur: the largest long bone in a horse. Proximally it forms a ball-and-socket joint with the pelvis to form the hip joint, and distally it meets the tibia and patella at the stifle joint. It serves as an attachment point for the deep and middle gluteal muscles, and the accessory and round ligaments.
- Patella
- Tibia: runs from stifle to hock. The proximal end provides attachment for the patellar ligaments, meniscal ligaments, cruciate ligaments, and collateral ligaments of the stifle. The distal end provides attachment for the collateral ligaments of the hock.
- Fibula: Much smaller than in most species, with a small head proximally (sometimes with incomplete fusion to the partial shaft of the bone), and completely fused to the tibia at the distal aspect in most horses.
- Hip joint : Ball-and-socket joint made up of the acetabulum of the pelvis and the head of the femur. It is very stable.
- Stifle joint (femoropatellar joint): composed of three joint compartments: the femoropatellar joint, the medial femorotibial joint, and the lateral femorotibial joint, which are stabilized by a network of ligaments. The stifle has an articular angle of about 150 degrees.
- Tarsus (hock): consists of 6 bones (of which one is made up of the fused 1st and 2nd tarsal bones) aligned in 3 rows. The largest bone in the hock, the calcaneus or fibular tarsal bone, corresponds to the human heel, and creates the tuber calcis (point of hock). It is to this point that the tendon of the gastrocnemius, portions of the biceps femoris, and portions of the superficial digital flexor attach.

=== Bones of the lower limb ===
Bones of the lower limb, present in both the front and hind legs, include the cannon bone (3rd metacarpal/3rd metatarsal), splint bones (2nd and 4th metacarpal/metatarsal), proximal sesamoid bones, long pastern (proximal or 1st phalanx), short pastern (middle or 2nd phalanx), coffin bone (distal or 3rd phalanx), and navicular bone (distal sesamoid). There are usually slight differences in these bones when comparing the front and the hind. The 3rd metatarsal is about 1/6 longer than the 3rd metacarpal. Similarly, the 2nd and 4th metatarsals are longer in length when compared to their front-end counterpart. In the hindlimb, the 1st phalanx is shorter and the 2nd phalanx is longer than in the frontlimb. In addition, the 2nd and 3rd phalanx are narrower in the hind limb. The angle created by these three bones in the hindleg is steeper by about 5 degrees, therefore making the pastern angle steeper behind than in front.

== Skeletal system disorders ==
- Arthritis (horse)
  - Degenerative joint disease (DJD), such as bone spavin, ringbone, omarthritis
  - Inflammatory joint disease such as Carpitis (sprained knee), osselets
- Bucked shins
- Curb
- Degenerative suspensory ligament desmitis (DSLD), and sprains of the suspensory ligament
- Fractures
- Locked kneecap (delayed patellar release or intermittent upward fixation of the patella)
- Navicular disease
- Osteochondrosis (horse)
- Sesamoiditis
- Splints
- Wry nose

=== Joint disease in horses ===
Performance horses, like human athletes, place a high amount of stress on their bones and joints. This is especially true if the horse jumps, gallops, or performs sudden turns or changes of pace, as can be seen in racehorses, show jumpers, eventers, polo ponies, reiners, and western performance horses. A high percentage of performance horses develop arthritis, especially if they are worked intensely when young or are worked on poor footing.

Treatment of early joint disease often involves a combination of management and nutraceuticals. Intramuscular, intravenous, and intra-articular medications may be added as the disease progresses. Advanced therapies, such as Interleukin-1 Receptor Antagonist Protein (IRAP) and stem cell treatments, are available for acute cases.
