= WRY =

WRY, or wry, may refer to:

== Arts and entertainment ==
- Gordon Wry (1910–1985), Canadian tenor and conductor
- Scotch and Wry, a Scottish television comedy sketch show
- WRY (musician), or Weronika Stasiak (born 1998), Polish singer-songwriter
- Wry, a fictional battle cry of Dio Brando in the JoJo's Bizarre Adventure series

== Medicine ==
- Wry neck
- Wry nose

== Places in the UK coded WRY ==
- West Riding of Yorkshire, northern England (by Chapman code in genealogy)
- Westray Airport, on Orkney, Scotland (IATA code)
- Wraysbury railway station, Berkshire, southern England (CRS code)

== See also ==
- Work (disambiguation)
