= Pastern =

Part of the leg of a horse

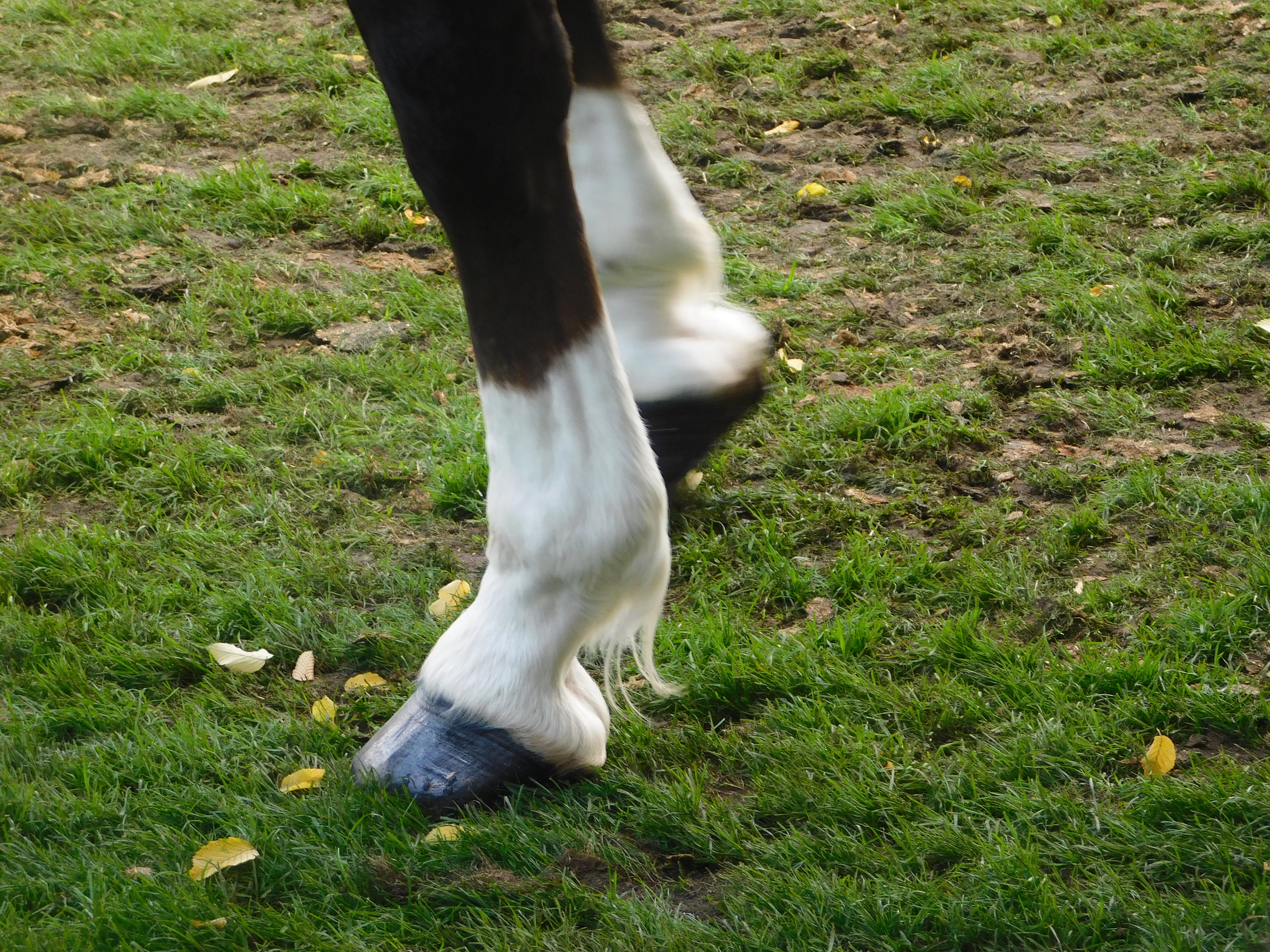

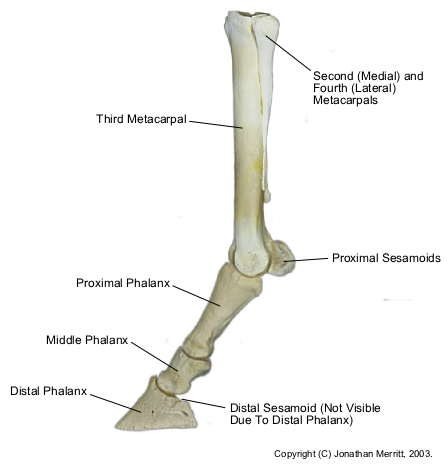
- The bones and joints of the equine forelimb distal to the wrist (or carpus): The fetlock (metacarpophalangeal joint) is located between the cannon bone (third metacarpal) and the long pastern bone (proximal phalanx). The pastern joint (proximal interphalangeal joint) is located between the long pastern bone and the short pastern bone (middle phalanx). The coffin joint (distal interphalangeal joint) is located between the short pastern bone and the coffin bone (distal phalanx).

Details

Identifiers
- Latin: Pāstōrius

The pastern is a part of the leg of a horse below the fetlock and above the hoof. It incorporates the long pastern bone (proximal phalanx) and the short pastern bone (middle phalanx), which are held together by two sets of paired ligaments to form the pastern joint (proximal interphalangeal joint). Anatomically homologous to the two largest bones found in the human finger, the pastern was famously mis-defined by Samuel Johnson in his dictionary as "the knee of a horse." When a lady asked Johnson how this had happened, he gave the much-quoted reply: "Ignorance, madam, pure ignorance."

== Anatomy and importance ==
The pastern consists of two bones, the uppermost called the "large pastern bone" or proximal phalanx, which begins just under the fetlock joint, and the lower called the "small pastern bone" or middle phalanx, located between the large pastern bone and the coffin bone, outwardly located at approximately the coronary band.

The joint between these two phalangeal bones is aptly called the "pastern joint". This joint has limited movement, but does help to disperse the concussive forces of the horse's step and also has some influence on the flexion or extension of the entire leg.

The pastern is vital in shock absorption. When the horse's front leg is grounded, the elbow and knee are locked. Therefore, the fetlock and pastern are responsible for all the absorption of concussive forces of a footfall. Together, they effectively distribute it among both the bones of the leg and the tendons and ligaments.

== Matching angles ==
The slope of the shoulder is often the same as the slope of the pastern. The angle of the pastern should also match the angle of the hoof after the latter has been trimmed (the angle will change as the hoof grows and may be off in a few weeks). This keeps the bones of the pastern and coffin joints in proper alignment, with a straight line running through their core. An angle broken forward or back increases the stress on these bones, joints, tendons, and ligaments. If the angle does not match, it could be an indication of poor farrier work, but some horses may have underlying conformational defects that can not be modified through farriery alone.

== Conformation ==
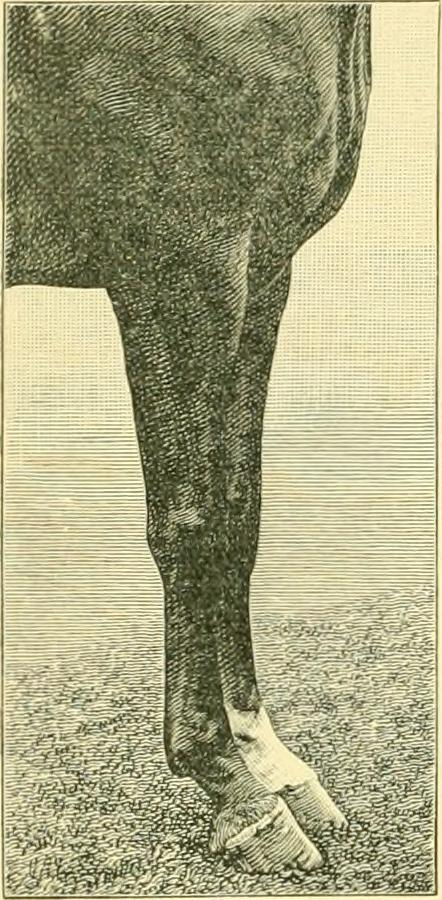
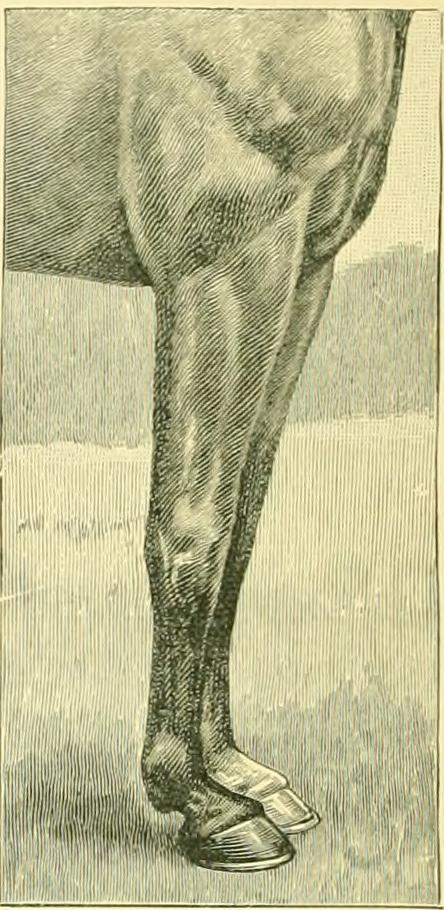
Normal pasterns (left), too sloping (right)

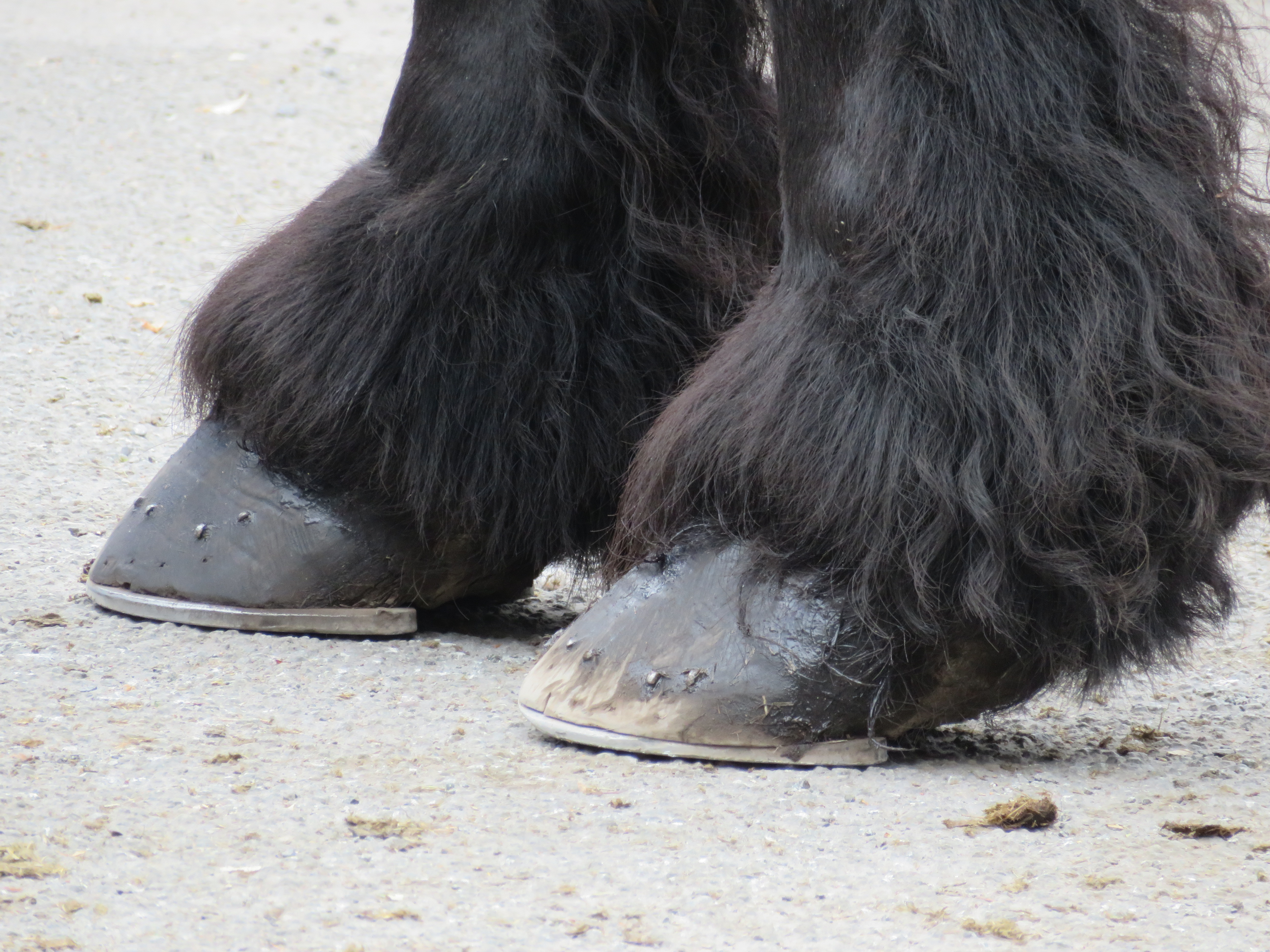
Pasterns obscured by heavy feathering

The pastern region is evaluated when a horse is studied conformationally, as it will affect the gait of the horse and the soundness of the joints above it. Traditionally, the ideal pastern of the front leg was a 45-degree angle. However, this angle has been revised to a slightly steeper angle of 47-55 degrees, as the traditional angle, although it makes for comfortable riding, greatly increases the chance of breakdown. Because there is less need for shock absorption in the hindleg, its pasterns are somewhat more upright than those of the front leg, to increase its strength (about 49-59 degrees). If the hind pasterns are the same angle as the front, or too sloping in general, then they are likely to break down during the horse's career, especially if the horse in employed in strenuous work. The length of the pastern is determined by the length of the first phalanx. The short pastern bone is less a determinant because it is smaller, at 2 inches in length, and part of it is encased in the hoof.

Heavy feathering on the lower legs can obscure the pasterns and any evaluation of their angle. Also, heavy feathering makes a horse prone to skin infections such as pastern dermatitis.

=== Long, sloping pasterns ===
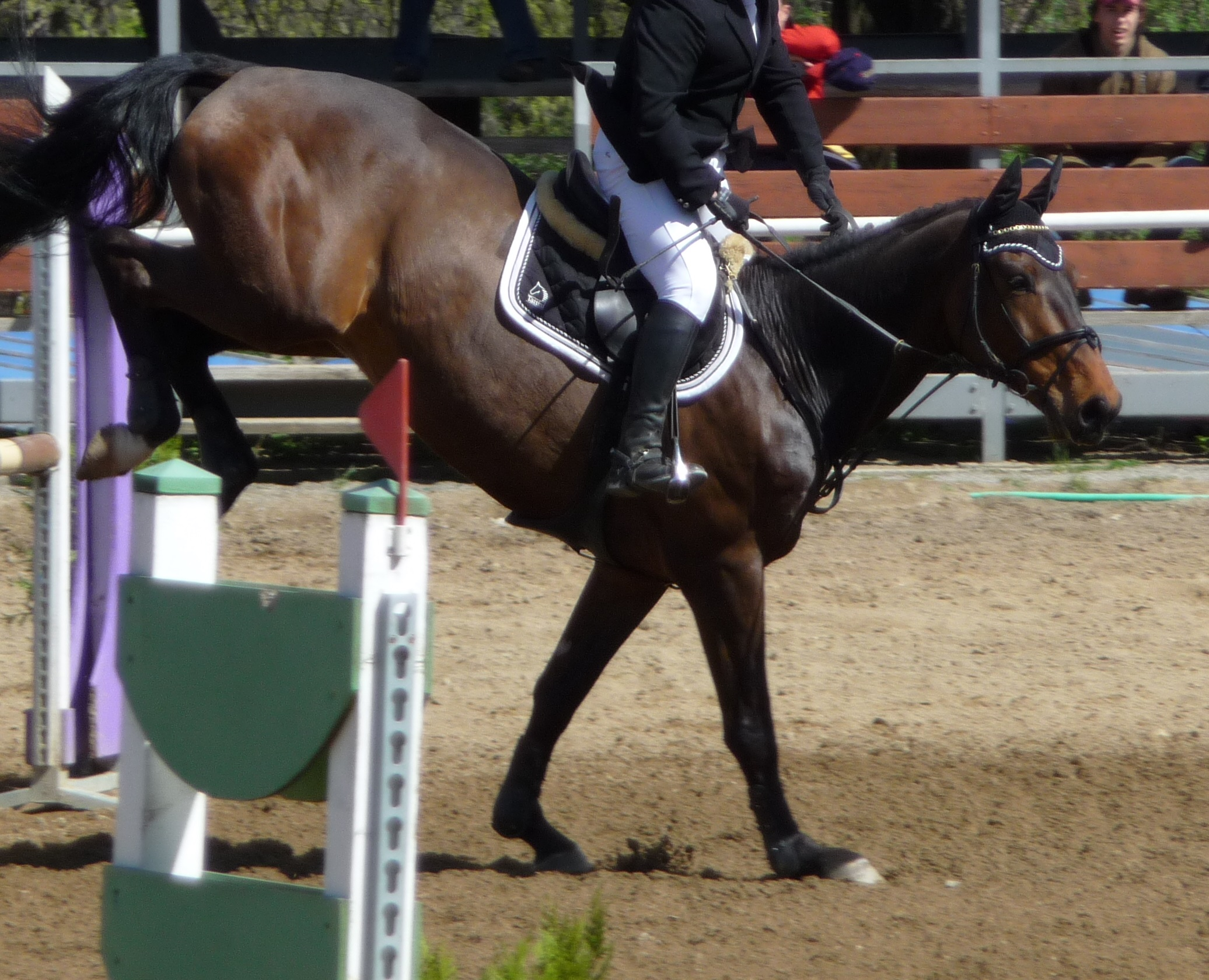
Typical fetlock hyperextension upon landing after a jump temporarily changes the angle of the pastern, and is not an indication of too-sloping pasterns

Long, sloping pasterns are commonly seen in Thoroughbreds and Saddlebreds. A nicely sloped pastern increases the likelihood of a long career. It improves the animal's ability to travel on uneven terrain, helps it withstand the rigors of a competition or race, and makes the gait more comfortable for the rider. They are desired in a riding horse because they increase the shock-absorption ability of the leg, making the horse's gait smoother and more comfortable for the rider. However, this flexibility also increases the risk of certain connective tissue injuries that are not seen in horses with more upright pasterns. This is because many of the tendons and ligaments that go down the back of the leg continue under the back of the fetlock joint, and attach to either the pastern bones or the coffin bone. When the horse puts weight on his leg, the fetlock sinks closer to the ground, which is a needed response as it helps to absorb the shock of the footfall. However, when the pasterns are too long or sloping it does not support the fetlock enough, and the fetlock may hyper-extend, possibly to the point where the ergot touches the ground. This stresses the soft tissues that run under the fetlock because they are stretched longer. If stretched too much, they may tear or rupture.

Medical problems that are more common in horses with long, sloping pasterns include: bowed tendon, sesamoiditis, injury to the suspensory ligament, and ringbone due to excessive stress on the pastern joint. Also, a fracture of the sesamoid bones found at the back of the fetlock may occur if the fetlock joint hyperextends to the point where it touches the ground.

=== Short, upright pasterns ===
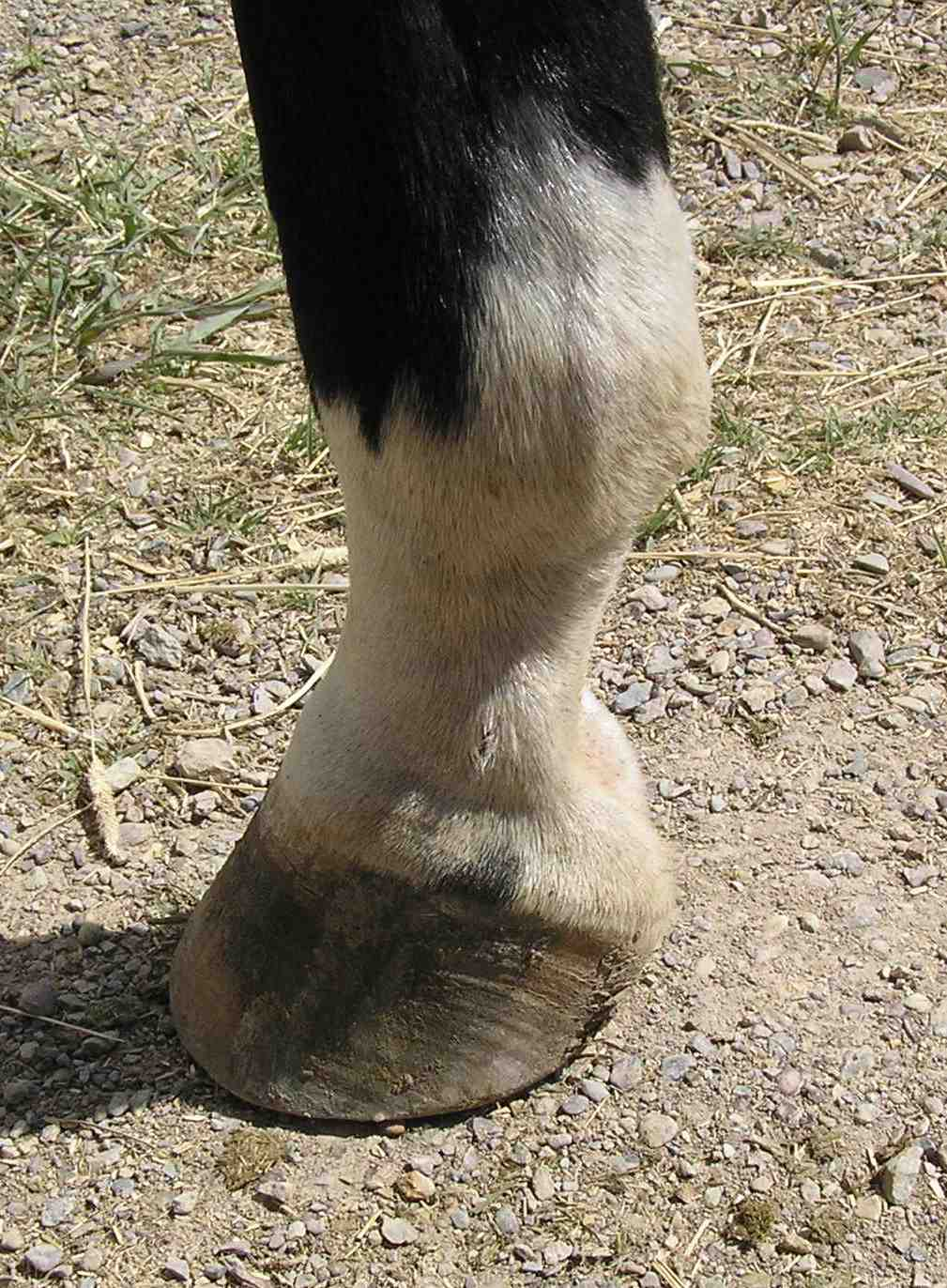
Upright pastern

Upright pasterns increase concussion by transmitting more of the shock of footfalls to the bones rather than the tendons. This not only makes the gaits uncomfortably jarring, but also increases the chance of arthritis and may shorten a horse's working life. Medical problems linked to short, upright pasterns are usually a result of excess concussion, and include: ringbone, sidebone, splints, bucked shins, knee injuries including bucked knees, navicular disease, and windpuffs.

== See also ==
- Limbs of the horse
- Equine anatomy
- Equine conformation
