= Coffin bone =

Bone in the hoof of hoofed animals

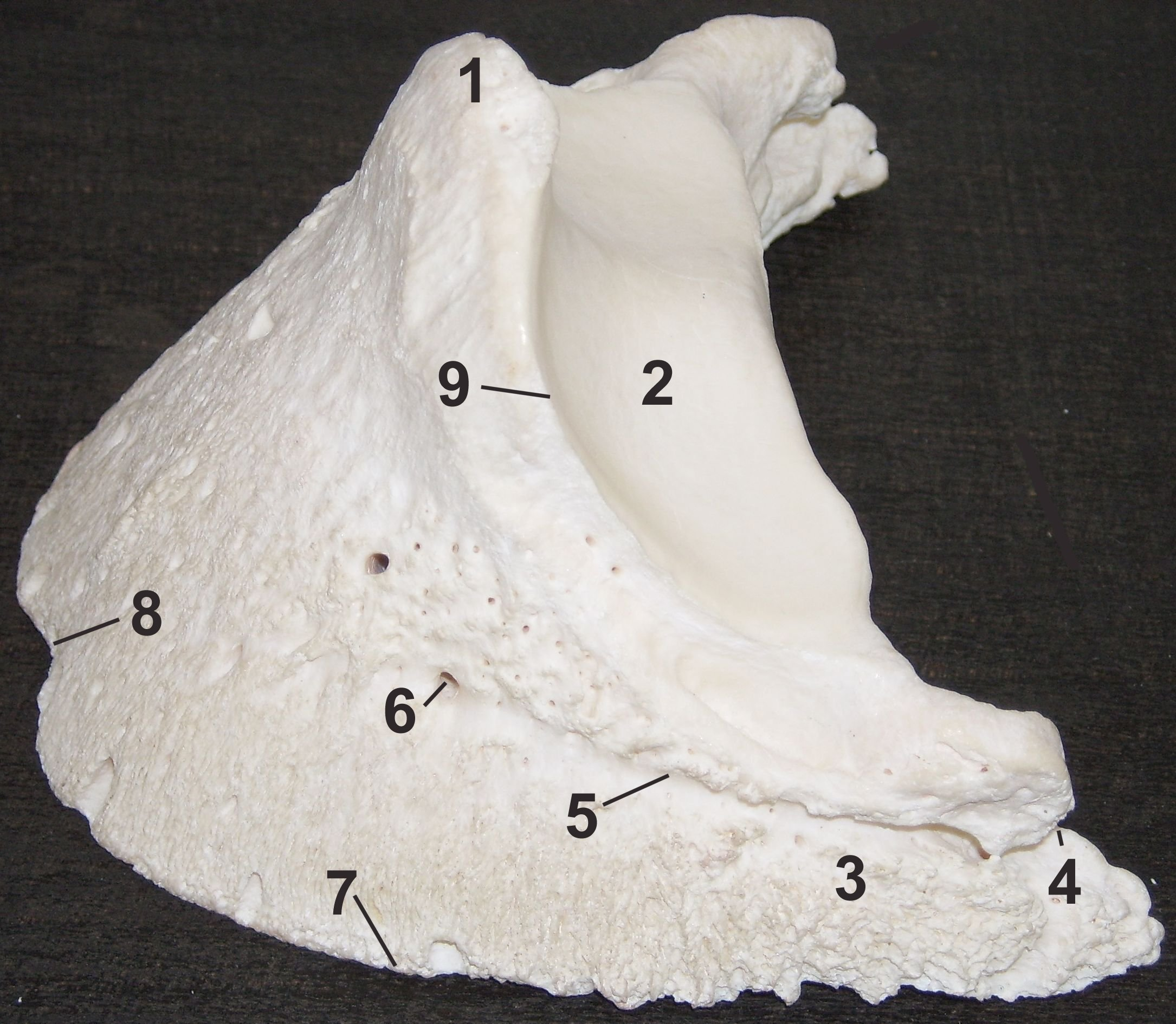
A coffin bone

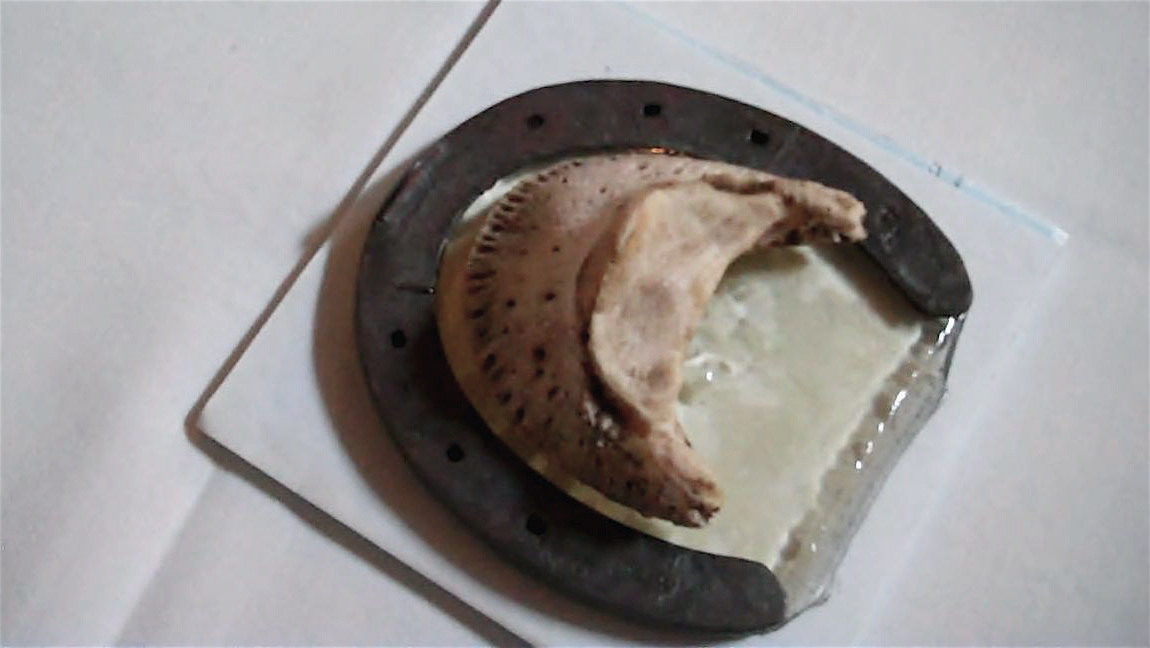
coffin bone shown in relationship to a horseshoe

The coffin bone, also known as the pedal bone (U.S.), is the distal phalanx, or "P3", the bottommost bone in the front and rear legs of horses, cattle, pigs and other ruminants. It is encased by the hoof capsule. In horses and other odd-toed ungulates, it is the third phalanx of the third digit; in even-toed ungulates such as cattle, they are the third phalanges of the paired third and fourth digits. The coffin bone meets the short pastern bone or second phalanx (P2) at the coffin joint. The coffin bone is connected to the inner wall of the horse hoof by a structure called the laminar layer. The insensitive laminae coming in from the hoof wall connect to the sensitive laminae layer, containing the blood supply and nerves, which is attached to the coffin bone. The laminae compose a critical structure for hoof health, therefore any injury to the hoof or its support system can in turn affect the coffin bone.

Despite the protection provided by the hoof, the coffin bone can be injured and fractured. For example, inflammatory conditions such as laminitis may lead to rotation of the coffin bone and associated permanent damage due to the coffin bone pulling away from the hoof wall as the laminar layer tears apart. Pedal osteitis is another common inflammatory condition. Fractures can also occur to coffin bones and, depending on the fracture, can cause severe lameness. Other conditions linked to the conformation of the horse, such as flexural contractures may also affect the coffin bone. For example, the coffin joint can become deformed and lead to changes of the coffin bone within the hoof capsule if the horse has an untreated club foot. Contracted heels can also affect the shape of the coffin bone, making it grow away from its normal, healthy shape. X-rays can diagnose injury, determine the position of the bone, and verify the type of damage that may have been received. Once injured, remedial shoeing can help protect the coffin bone from further trauma. Treatment of assorted disorders may also involve use of shoe pads, anti-inflammatory medication, and management changes.

== See also ==
- Skeletal system of the horse
- Limbs of the horse
- Equine forelimb anatomy
