= Carpus and tarsus of land vertebrates =

Wrist and heel bones of land vertebrates

== Carpals and tarsals ==
The carpus (wrist) and tarsus (ankle) of land vertebrates primitively had three rows of carpal or tarsal bones. Often, some of these have become lost or fused in evolution.

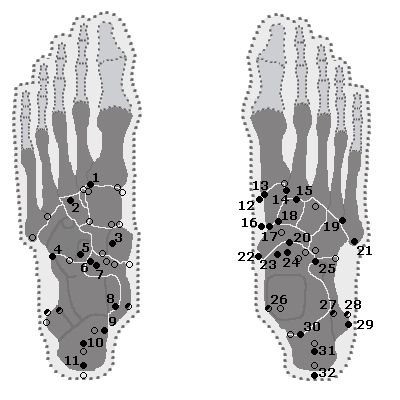
Accessory bones amidst tarsals

- Three proximal bones. Humans hold all three in their hands. In the foot, the middle proximal appears in 5–15% of people as an os trigonum and can be involved in foot pain.
- Centrale or os centrale, is on the medial side. In humans and our closest relatives, the African apes (chimpanzees and gorillas), it fuses to the scaphoid, where it forms the articulation with the trapezoid bone; occasionally it stays separate. In Man's foot, it is the navicular. Some early land vertebrates had more than one (up to three) os centrale per hand or foot (plural "(ossa) centralia").
- Distal bones, one per finger / toe at the base of each metacarpal or metatarsal. In mammals, the 4th and 5th fuse. In the horse, the first is lost.

Figure to the right shows locations of rare accessory bones of the foot (presence variable from person to person): 1 = os cuneometatarsal I plantare, 2 = os uncinatum, 3 = os sesamoideum tibialis posterior, 4 = os sesamoideum peroneum, 5 = os cuboideum secundarium, 6 = os trochlear calcanei, 7 = os in sinus tarsi, 8 = os sustentaculum tali, 9 = os talocalcaneal posterius, 10 = os aponeurosis plantaris, 11 = subcalcaneal os, 12 = os sesamoideum tibialis anterior, 13 = os cuneometatarsal I tibiale, 14 = os intermetatarsal I, 15 = os cuneometatarsal II dorsale, 16=os paracuneiforme, 17 = os cuneonavicular, 18 = os intercuneiforme, 19 = os intermetatarsal IV, 20 = os talonaviculare, 21 = os vesalianum pedis, 22 = os tibiale externum, 23 = os talotibiale dorsale, 24 = os supratalare, 25 = os calcaneus secundarius, 26 = os subtibiale, 27 = os subfibulare, 28 = os retinaculi, 29 = os calcaneus accessorius, 30 = os trigonum, 31 = os supracalcaneum, 32 = os tendinis calcanei.

== Comparative vertebrate anatomy ==
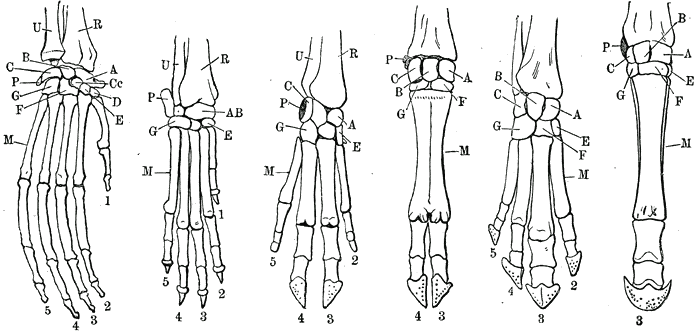

Abbreviations: A, Scaphoid bone; B, Lunate bone; C, Triquetrum; D, Trapezium; E, Trapezoid; F, Capitatum; G, Hamatum;

P, Pisiform; Cc, Central carpal; M, Metacarpal; (A-G, Cc, and P are Carpals). 1–5, thumb and digits two to five. R, Radius; U, Ulna.

From the classic German encyclopedia Meyers Konversations-Lexikon 1888.

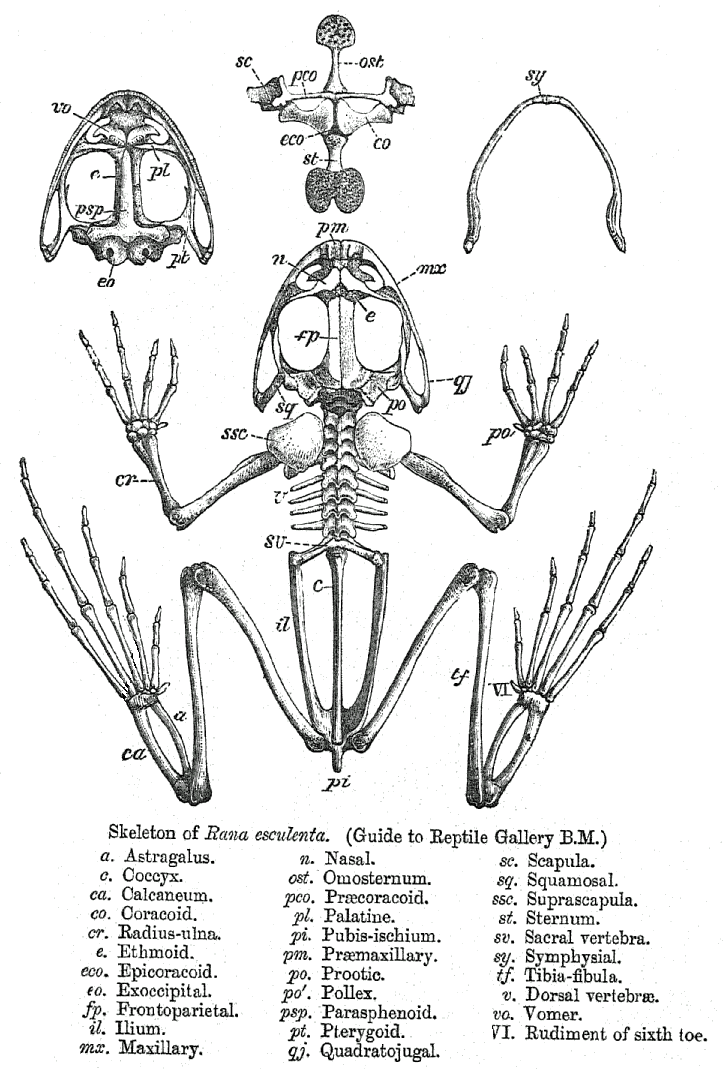

Frog four limbs and human foot compared.

== See also ==
- Tetrapod limbs
