= Wry nose =

Deviation of the rostral maxilla

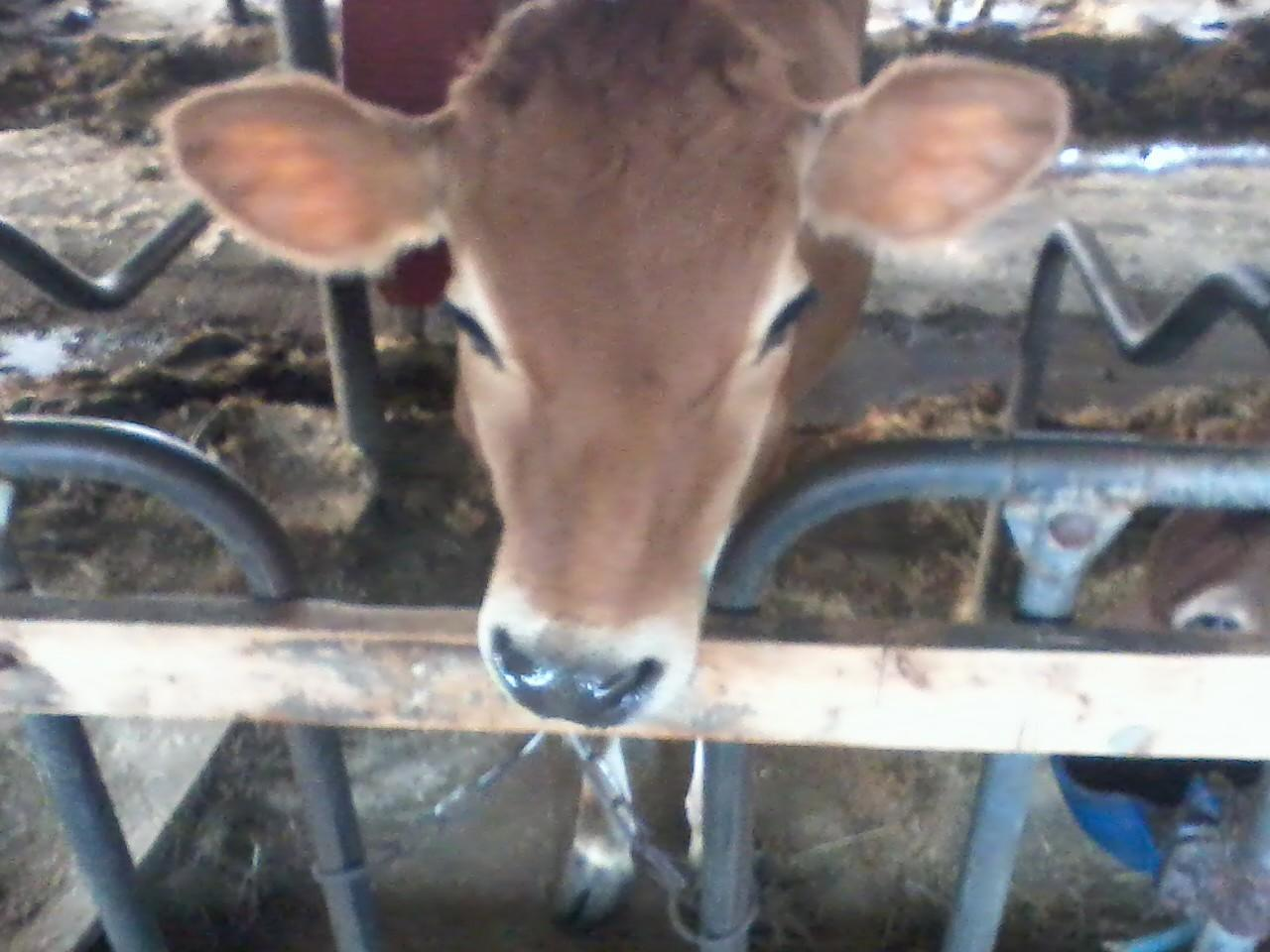
Jersey calf with wry nose

Wry nose is a deviation of the rostral maxilla, meaning that the upper jaw and nose are deviated to one side. This usually causes the nasal septum (the cartilage plate that separates the right and left nasal passageways) to be deviated as well, resulting in obstruction of the airway, and breathing difficulties. Wry nose is most obvious in species with long faces, such as horses and cattle. It is a congenital abnormality, meaning that it is present at birth.In horses two groups of congenital abnormalities, namely malformations or deformations are seen. In the case of the former a frequent result is foetal abortion. These true malformations include, but are not limited to, cleft palate, heart defects, microphthalmia, microencephaly and hydrocephalus. Deformations, include wry nose and flexural limb deformities, and are due to restricted movement of the foetus in the womb.

== Wry nose in the horse ==
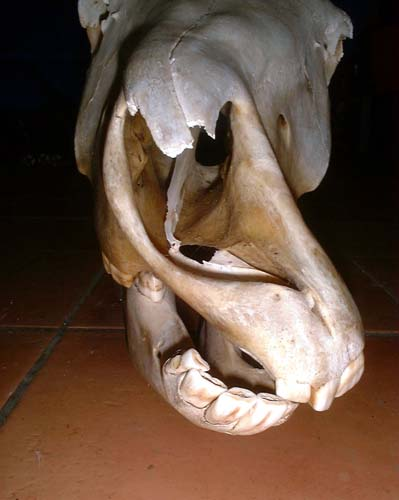
Skull of a 4-year-old wry nosed horse

The cause of wry nose in horses is unknown; it may have a genetic cause, or be due to malpositioning in the uterus. A wry nose may cause difficulty during foaling (dystocia).

A foal with wry nose may have poor alignment (malocclusion) of the teeth, although foals can usually still nurse and in most cases are bright and active. Affected horses may have difficulty prehending food (taking food up into their mouth) and difficulty chewing food, which can lead to uneven wearing of the cheek teeth. Other deformities may be present, such as neck deformities, or, occasionally, limb deformities.

Radiography (x-ray) of the head can be used to assess the severity of the skull deviation, and endoscopy can be used to assess any abnormalities in the soft palate and the nasal passages. Mild cases of wry nose will not require treatment, but severe deviations will need reconstructive surgery. Such surgery requires significant aftercare, the cosmetic appearance cannot be guaranteed, athletic performance is likely to be poor, and further surgeries may be required. Euthanasia is indicated if the surgery is unlikely to be successful.
