= Sweeney =

Sweeney may refer to:

== People ==
- Sweeney (name)
- Clan Sweeney, an Irish clan of Scottish origin

== Places ==
- Sweeney Mountains, Palmer Land, Antarctica
- Sweeney Ridge, a national park in California, United States

== Veterinary medicine ==
- Sweeney (horse pathological condition)

== Arts and entertainment ==
- The Madness of Sweeney, a mediaeval Irish legend
- Sweeney an Australian bush ballad (1893) by Henry Lawson
- Sweeney Agonistes, an abandoned "Aristophanic Melodrama" by T. S. Eliot; also two poems, "Sweeney Erect" and "Sweeney Among the Nightingales" from Eliot's Poems (1920)
- The Sweeney, a British television series
- Sweeney!, a spin-off film of the TV show
- Sweeney 2, the 1978 sequel
- The Sweeney (2012 film)
- The Sweeney: Paris, an alternative name for the French film The Squad (2015 film), a remake of the 2012 film
- The Sweeney, British band, formed by Murray Torkildsen, of John Otway's Big Band

== Other uses ==
- London slang for the Flying Squad, a branch of the Metropolitan Police Service, from the Cockney rhyming "Sweeney Todd"

== See also ==
- Sweeny (disambiguation)
- Justice Sweeney (disambiguation)
