= Sweeny (disambiguation) =

Sweeny is a surname. It may also refer to:

- Sweeny Inlet, Antarctica
- Sweeny, Texas, United States, a city
  - Sweeny High School (Texas)
- Clarence Williams (defensive end) (1946–2017), American football player nicknamed "Sweeny"
- The title character of Sweeny Toddler, a British comic strip published between 1973 and 2000
- Operation Sweeny, a 15 October 2003 anti-smuggling operation during the Iraq War

== Veterinary medicine ==
- Sweeny or sweeney (horse lameness)

== See also ==
- Sweeney (disambiguation)
