= Sidebone =

Sidebone is a common condition of horses, characterized by the ossification of the collateral cartilages of the coffin bone. These are found on either side of the foot protruding above the level of the coronary band. The lateral cartilages support the hoof wall and provide an important role in the support and cushioning provided to the heel. The front feet are most commonly affected.

== Causes ==
Repeated concussion of the foot is probably the cause in many cases. Such concussion could be produced when a horse is always worked on a hard surface. There also appears to be a hereditary component to sidebone but this may be because bad conformation is hereditary and bad conformation appears to predispose to sidebone. Bad conformation would include

- those with narrow, upright feet
- those with unbalanced feet, especially if they have toe-in or toe-out conformation
- draft horses, or horses with a heavy build, are more likely to develop sidebone than light horses or ponies

== Symptoms ==
Sidebone may be associated with lameness but many horses with sidebone are not lame. It follows that sidebone often gets blamed for being the cause of lameness when there is actually another cause.

== Diagnosis ==
Careful examination of the collateral cartilages by palpation can give a good indication that they are solid and bony rather than firm, springy cartilage. Usually, however, sidebone is found accidentally when the foot is radiographed, as sidebone has few outward signs in most cases. In mild cases, there are small areas of calcification; more advanced cases will have ossification of the entire cartilage. Rarely, severe lameness can be caused by fracture of an ossified cartilage, or by ossification which deviates enough to impinge on the short pastern bone.

== Treatment ==
Sidebone usually does not cause any problems, but when it does it is difficult to treat. Box rest and Non-steroidal anti-inflammatory drugs such as bute may be useful. In some cases the only useful treatment is a neurectomy of the palmar digital nerves.

== Prognosis ==
Many horses compete actively in demanding sports with sidebone, and are not hindered in any way. If the ossification is severe and associated with lameness then the prognosis is more guarded. Discovery of sidebone on an equine prepurchase exam without signs of lameness or local sensitivity should not affect the purchaser's opinion of the horse.

== Sources ==
- King, Christine; Mansmann, Richard (1997). Equine Lameness. Equine Research. pp. 689–691.
