= Sweeny =

Sweeny is a surname which may refer to:

- Alastair Sweeny (born 1946), Canadian publisher, historian, and author
- Bailey Sweeny (born 2003), Australian racing driver
- Charles Sweeny (1882–1963), American soldier of fortune
- Charles Francis Sweeny (1910–1993), American businessman and socialite instrumental in forming the Second World War Eagle Squadrons, nephew of the soldier of fortune
- Craig Sweeny, American television producer and screenwriter
- Dane Sweeny (born 2001), Australian tennis player
- George Sweeny (1796–1877), American politician
- Glynis Sweeny (born 1962), American illustrator and caricaturist
- Harry Sweeny (born 1998), Australian racing cyclist
- Hugh Sweeny, Australian prisoner of war during the Second World War
- James Sweeny (1857–1940), Canadian Anglican bishop
- John Sweeny (bishop) (1821–1901), Canadian Roman Catholic bishop
- John Sweeny (judge) (born 1949), American judge
- Mary Sweeny, 19th-century American vandal
- Matt Sweeny, Australian-American inventor and entrepreneur
- Peter B. Sweeny (1825–1911), American lawyer and politician
- Robert Sweeny Jr. (1911–1983), American amateur golfer and socialite, brother of Charles Francis Sweeny and nephew of Charles Sweeny.
- Thomas William Sweeny (1820–1892), Irish-American Union Army general

== Veterinary medicine ==
- Sweeny (horse lameness)

== See also ==
- Sweeney (name)
