= Lameness (equine) =

Abnormal gait or stance in horses

Lameness is an abnormal gait or stance of an animal that is the result of dysfunction of the locomotor system. In the horse, it is most commonly caused by pain, but can be due to neurologic or mechanical dysfunction. Lameness is a common veterinary problem in racehorses, sport horses, and pleasure horses. It is one of the most costly health problems for the equine industry, both monetarily for the cost of diagnosis and treatment, and for the cost of time off resulting in loss-of-use.

== Causes of lameness ==
Lameness is most commonly caused by pain, but may also be the result of neuromuscular disease or mechanical restriction. Lameness itself is a clinical sign, and not a diagnosis.

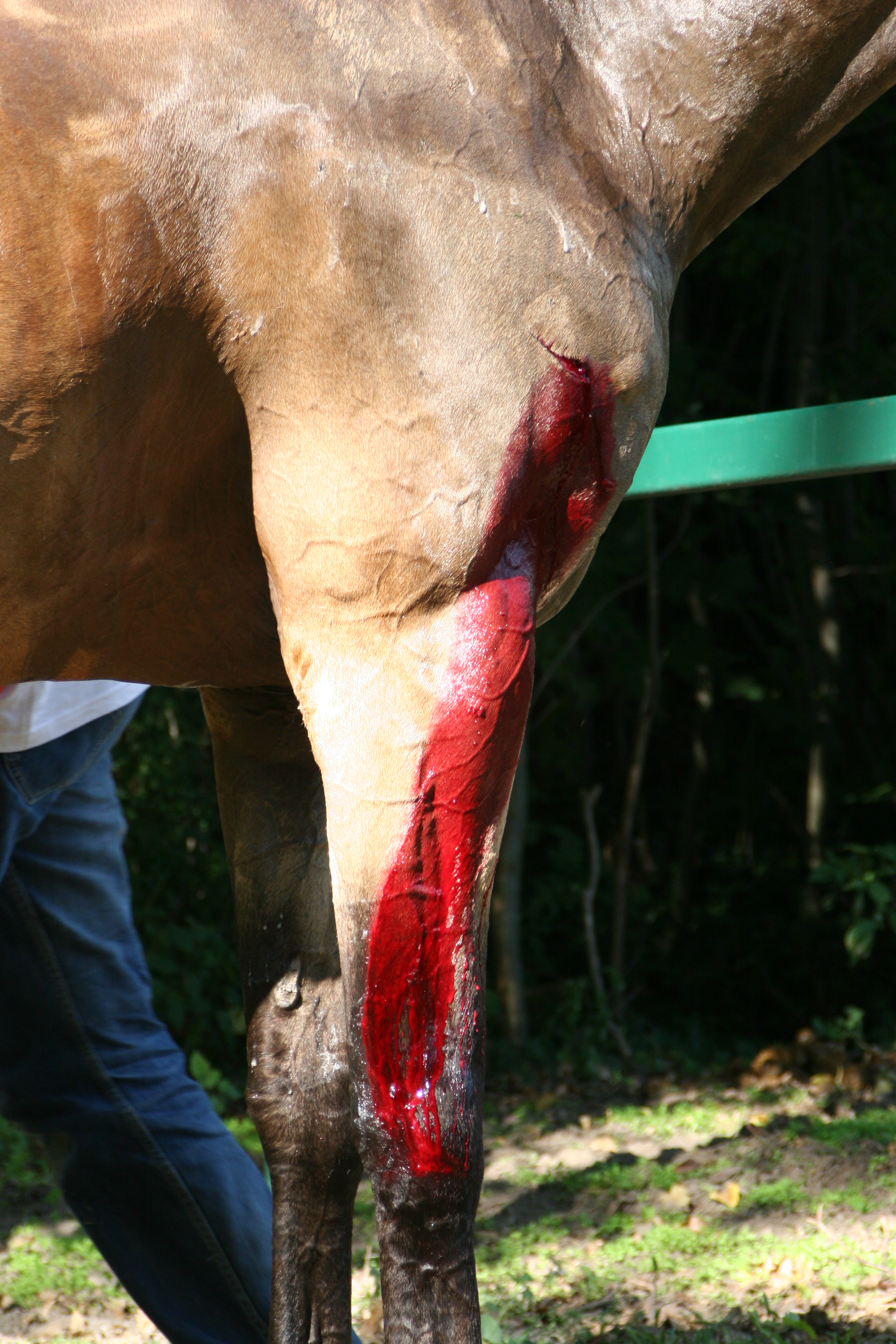
Trauma is a common cause of lameness in horses.

=== Pain ===
Pain is the most common cause of lameness in the horse. It is usually the result of trauma or orthopedic disease, but other causes such as metabolic dysfunction, circulatory disease, and infection can also cause pain and subsequent lameness.

Orthopedic causes of lameness are very common and may be the result of damage to the hoof, bone, joints, or soft tissue. Horses are predisposed to orthopedic lameness by conformational flaws, poor hoof balance, working on poor footing, repetitive movements, poor conditioning for a given activity, and competing at a very high athletic level.

Metabolic causes of lameness include hyperkalemic periodic paralysis (HYPP) and polysaccharide storage myopathy, which directly affect muscular function.

Circulatory causes of lameness occur when blood flow to an area is compromised. This may be due to abnormal blood clotting, as in the case of aortic-iliac thrombosis, or decreased blood flow (ischemia) to an area, such as is sometimes seen in laminitis.

Infectious causes of lameness are the result of inflammation and damage to tissue. These include problems such as cellulitis, hoof abscesses, and septic arthritis.

=== Mechanical lameness ===
Mechanical lameness is caused by a physical abnormality, such as scar tissue, that prevents normal motion of a limb. Mechanical lameness does not cause pain. Classic examples of mechanical lameness include upward fixation of the patella and fibrotic myopathy, but any type of adhesion (often secondary to scarring during healing post-injury) or fibrosis can cause mechanical lameness.

- Upward fixation of the patella occurs when the normal locking mechanism of the stifle, which allows the horse to "lock" its hind legs into a fixed position so it may stand with minimal effort, engages at inappropriate times such as when the horse is walking. It results in an inability to flex the stifle, so the horse must walk with an extended hind leg. It is associated with straight hind limb conformation (post leg), poor muscling of the hind limb, stifle trauma, and genetics.
- Fibrotic myopathy is caused by damage to the hamstring muscles, usually from trauma or intramuscular injection. It results in the formation of scar tissue and produces a characteristic gait where the horse prematurely "slaps" the ground with its hind foot, shortening the stride length in the damaged leg.

=== Neurological lameness ===
Neurologic lameness may be the result of infection, trauma, toxicities, or congenital disease. Neurological evaluation of a lame horse may be warranted if the cause of the lameness is not obvious. Signs more commonly associated with a neurologic cause include unilateral muscle atrophy, paresis, paralysis, or dysmetria. Neurologic causes of lameness include:

- Cervical vertebral stenotic myopathy (Wobbler disease): compression of the spinal cord in the cervical (neck) region results in lameness, ataxia, and change in gait, especially in the hind legs, and neck stiffness or pain.
- Stringhalt: caused by damage to the long digital extensor muscle, or from eating the weed Hypochaeris radicata; it produces a gait characterized by rapid, spasmodic hyperflexion of the hind limbs.
- Shivers: a rare neuromuscular disorder characterized by muscle tremors, difficulty picking up the hind feet when asked to lift for farriery work, hyperflexion or hyperextension of the hind limbs, and abduction of the hind limbs. Normal athletic function is often maintained, at least initially.
- Cerebellar abiotrophy: a rare genetic disorder that occurs in Arabian horses, producing ataxia, a base-wide stance, proprioceptive deficits, and high-stepping gait.
- Damage to individual nerves will affect the muscles they innervate and subsequently alter gait. Radial nerve paralysis will cause a dropped elbow and make it difficult to extend the affected limb. Suprascapular nerve damage will lead to atrophy of the main muscles of the shoulder (sweeny). Femoral nerve paralysis causes hyperflexion of the stifles, hocks, and fetlocks and the horse usually walks on the toe of the hind foot.
- Infectious causes affecting the nervous system may be bacterial, viral, protozoal, or rickettsial. Those that commonly alter gait include tetanus, botulism, Lyme disease, equine protozoal myeloencephalitis (EPM), rabies, West Nile virus, equine encephalitis virus, and equine herpesvirus 1.
- Neoplasic (cancerous) changes in the brain or around the spinal cord may also cause alterations in gait.

== Signs of lameness ==
Manifestations of lameness include any alteration in gait from what is normal for the horse. In general, it is harder to detect hind limb lameness when compared to lameness in a front limb when using visual cues.

=== Identifying a front limb lameness ===
The classic sign of lameness in a front leg is a prominent "head bob." Viewed from the side, the horse raises its head and neck when the lame leg hits the ground, which helps to unload the lame leg. This is sometimes remembered by the adage "down on sound." A head bob is usually easy to see when one leg is lame, but can be subtle in very mild unilateral lameness, or in the case of bilateral front limb lameness. A horse may also try to reduce impact on a lame front leg by tensing of the muscles of the shoulder. In this case, it will stiffen the limb just before it hits the ground, a sign that may be noticed by an astute observer.

=== Identifying a hind limb lameness ===
Evaluation of hind limb lameness can be difficult. Generally, the viewer watches the hip, sacrum, gluteal muscles, or hemi-pelvis (pelvis of one side of the body) when examining lameness in the hind end. Examination should be performed both watching the horse from behind while trotting away from the examiner, and from the side as the horse passes.

When watching from behind, the viewer often looks for a "hip hike" or "pelvic hike." This occurs when the horse raises the pelvis on the lame side as it is bearing weight, trying to shift weight off of the painful leg in a manner similar to raising of the head in front limb lameness. This is a sudden, short upward motion of the hemi-pelvis or gluteal muscles. The hip of the lame leg does not always rise above the level of the hip of the sound leg, which can be confusing to those looking for a "hip hike." Instead, it is an exaggerated upward movement that is watched for during weight bearing. Additionally, horses with a hind limb lameness will tend to reduce the degree of leg use. To do so, some horses will reduce the contraction time of the gluteals on the side of the lame leg, leading to a "hip roll" or "hip dip" and appearance that the hip drops a greater degree on the side of the lame leg.

These apparently contradictory statements ("hip hike" vs "hip drop" on the lame leg) can be explained by when the horse perceives pain during the stride. If the pain is perceived during the early stance phase of the stride, the horse will try to unweight the leg and produce a "hip hike." If the pain is perceived during the pushoff phase of the stride, the horse does not push with as much force, subsequently reducing the height the pelvis is raised, and leading to a "dipping" motion during the swing phase of the stride as the horse brings the limb forward. In some cases, both a hip hike and a hip drop can be seen in the same horse. Some practitioners simply look for the side with the greater overall deviation, which occurs in the lame leg

Another method to detecting hind limb lameness requires watching the pelvis from the side. The entire pelvis is evaluated, and its relative position vertically (relative to the ground) is compared at various points in the stride. The pelvis normally rises and falls with each step. Horses with pain during the early stance phase of the trot will not allow the pelvis to drop as much when the lame leg is weighted, trying to avoid extra weight on the painful leg. Subsequently, the pelvis will not fall as much downward when the lame leg is bearing weight as when the sound leg is bearing weight. When viewed from behind, this is seen as a "hip hike." If the horse is more painful as it is pushing off a limb, it will not push off with as much force, and the pelvis will rise less on the lame side relative to the same point of the stride when the sound leg is on the ground. This is seen as the "hip roll" when viewed from behind.

Other signs that indicate hind limb lameness include "plaiting" with the hind feet, which can be seen in cases of sacro-iliac pain, carrying the hindquarters to one side or drifting in one direction, decreased impulsion, and the saddle slip to one side.

=== Other signs of lameness ===
Several other signs are applicable to both front and hind limb lameness. One method is to look at the relative time a leg spends in the cranial (forward) phase of the stride. For a front leg, this is when the lower leg is in front of the horse, i.e. angled forward, while the caudal phase is when the leg is underneath the horse, i.e. angled backward. For a hind leg, the cranial phase occurs when the lower leg is under the body of the horse, and the caudal phase is when the limb is out behind the body of the horse.

A normal horse with have a cranial phase and a caudal phase of equal length: the horse will bring the leg as far forward as it does backward. In a lame horse, the cranial phase will be shorter when compared to the caudal phase, so it appears to spend more time with the leg backward than it does forward. A shortened cranial phase is most commonly seen in cases of bilateral lameness, lameness of the upper limb (such as shoulder or hip pain), and osteoarthritis of the hocks.

Decreased fetlock drop during the stance phase of the stride may be seen in cases of lameness, with the lamer leg producing less drop than the sound leg as the horse tries to relieve weight on the painful limb. Decreased height to the stride (flight arc), or dragging of the toes, also indicates lameness, as the horse avoids bending its joints. In the front limb, decreased flight arc is usually seen in cases of shoulder, knee, or fetlock joint pain, and is often associated with reduced cranial phase and lengthened caudal phase of the stride. At times, lameness may be heard. Usually the horse has a stronger, louder sound on the beat where the sound hooves hits the ground, but a softer, less resonate sound occurring on the beat where the lame leg is hitting the ground. Again, this is because the horse is landing with less force as it tries to avoid weighting the painful leg.

Lastly, behavioral changes and decreased performance may indicate pain, even if obvious clinical lameness is not evident.

== The lameness evaluation ==
A lameness exam is used to try to pinpoint the cause of lameness in the horse, which subsequently guides treatment. It is the first step to evaluate decreased performance in an equine athlete, even if the horse does not appear overtly lame, to rule out any pain-associated cause.

Lameness exams are also a key component of the pre-purchase examination. These examinations evaluate the horse to give the potential buyer information regarding present soundness of the horse. Veterinarians may comment on aspects that could inhibit the use of the horse for the buyer's intended activity, such as subclinical osteoarthritis or conformational defects. However, the veterinarian is not there to "pass" or "fail" a horse, but only to give their impression of the horse on that day. Therefore, pre-purchase examinations make no guarantees of the future health or soundness of the horse. The pre-purchase exam may range in scope depending on the desire of the buyer, from a simple examination with hoof and flexion tests, to multiple radiographs, ultrasound, and advanced imaging techniques including MRI.

=== History ===
A detailed history is the first step of a lameness exam.

1. Age: Foals are more likely to have infectious causes of lameness (septic arthritis). Horses just starting training may be lame due to a developmental orthopedic disease, such as osteochondrosis. Older animals are more likely to experience osteoarthritis.
2. Breed: Breed-specific diseases, such as hyperkalemic periodic paralysis (HYPP), can be ruled out. Additionally, some breeds or types are more prone to certain types of lameness.
3. Discipline: Certain lamenesses are associated with certain uses. For example, racehorses are more likely to have fatigue-related injuries such as stress fractures and injury to the flexor tendons, while western show horses are more likely to have navicular syndrome and English sport horses are more likely to have osteoarthritis or injury to the suspensory ligament.
4. Past history of lameness: An old injury may be re-injured. In the case of progressive disease, such as osteoarthritis, a horse will often experience recurrent lameness that must be managed. Shifting lameness may suggest a bilateral injury or infectious cause of lameness.
5. Duration and progression the lameness: Acute injury is more common with soft tissue injury. Chronic, progressive disease is more common in cases such as osteoarthritis and navicular disease.
6. Recent changes in management: such as turn-out, exercise level, diet, or shoeing.
7. Effect of exercise on degree of lameness.
8. Any treatment implemented, including rest.

=== Physical examination and palpation ===
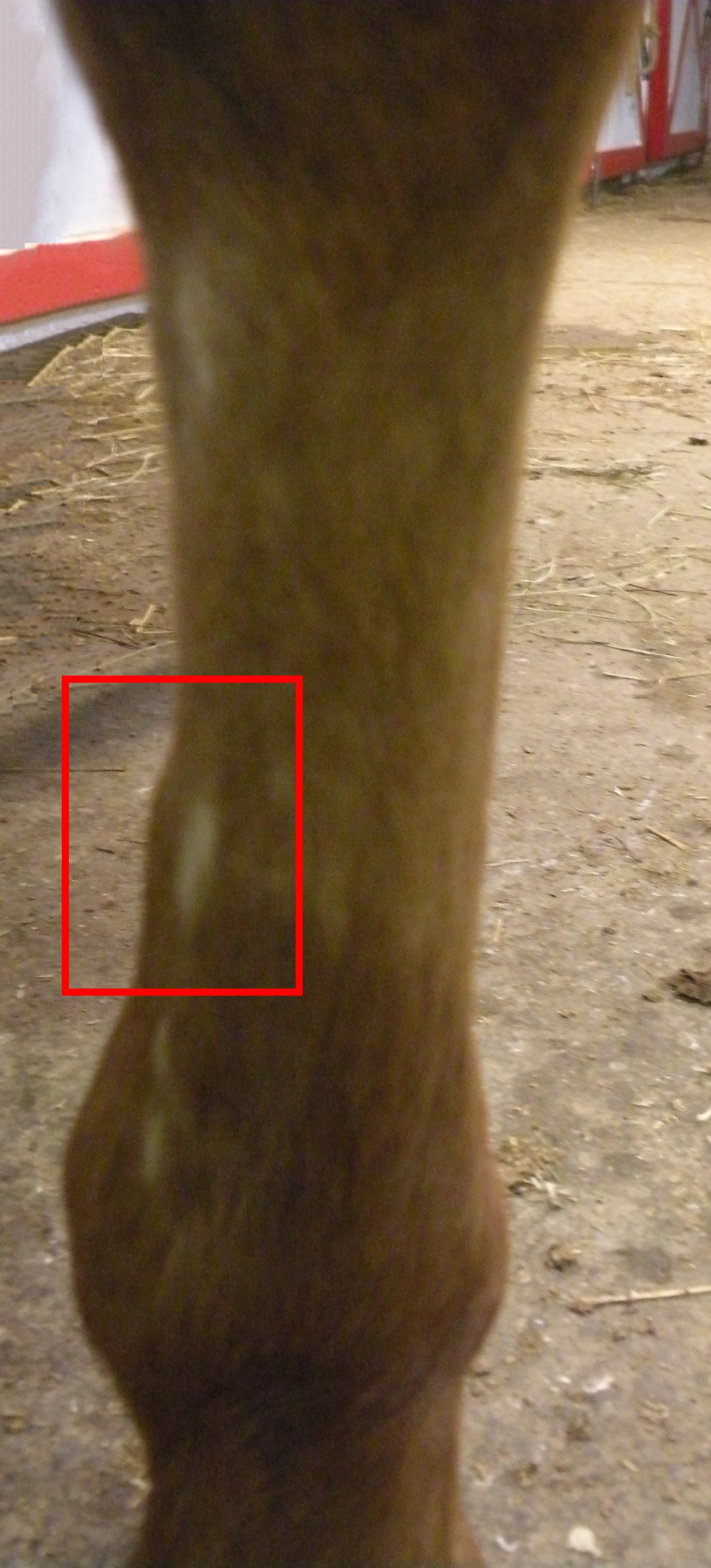
Splints can be palpated on physical examination.

One of the first steps of the lameness examination is to evaluate the horse at rest. A good evaluation of conformation, including overall body type, can help the practitioner determine the potential cause of lameness. Certain conformational defects can predispose a horse to injury, and knowledge of correct conformation can help narrow down possible causes of injury, especially when combined with the horse's history. The horse's stance is also evaluated. Frequently resting a particular leg, "pointing" a foot (holding a leg out in front of the body), or standing in an abnormal position can indicate compensation for an injury. Shifting of weight is normal in the hind legs, but frequent shifting of weight in the front legs, or placing both front feet in front of the body, can indicate bilateral forelimb lameness. Stifle pain sometimes causes a horse to stand with the stifles rotated out. Hip and pelvic pain can produce a toe-out, stifle out, hock-in stance and that remains present at the walk.

Asymmetry of the muscular structure, due to muscle atrophy, usually occurs on the side of the lame limb. Hind limb lameness or pelvic fracture can cause unilateral atrophy of the middle gluteal or gracilis muscles. Damage to the suprascapular nerve can lead to atrophy of the muscles of the shoulder (supraspinatus and infraspinatus). Neck muscle atrophy can be seen with cervical vertebral malformation (Wobbler's disease), articular facet osteoarthritis, and neurologic causes of lameness. Asymmetry in a limb can also occur due to swelling of a joint or soft tissue. For this reason, each leg should be compared to its partner.

After a visual exam, the practitioner palpates the horse, feeling for heat, swelling, and sensitivity to pressure indicating pain. Palpation is usually most thoroughly performed in the lower limb, but a comprehensive exam will include palpation of the back, pelvis, and neck. Joints should be palpated for pain, effusion of joint pouches, thickening of the joint capsule, and checked for range of motion. Major ligaments and tendons, such as the superficial and deep digital flexor tendons, inferior check ligament, suspensory ligament, and distal sesamoidean ligaments, should also be palpated along their entire length. Individual bones may be palpated if injury is suspected, such as a fracture, bucked shins in racehorses (cannon bones), or splints (splint bones).

Specialized manipulative tests can be used to help identify specific areas of pain:

- The Churchill test: pressure is applied to the plantar surface of the head of the medial splint bone. A painful horse will flex and abduct the limb, indicating hock pain.
- Peroneus tertius rupture: The hock is pulled into extension while the stifle is flexed. A positive test (the ability to extend the hock) indicates a ruptured peroneus tertius muscle.
- Patella displacement: the patella is pushed laterally and proximally, to test for upward fixation of the patella.
- Cruciate test: the examiner moves the tibia sharply caudally, to feel for movement away from the femur or crepitus. Excessive movement can indicate cruciate rupture.
- Test for stifle collateral ligament damage: the stifle is held still, while the distal limb is abducted (to test for damage to the medial collateral ligament) or adducted (to test for lateral collateral ligament damage). Excessive movement by the distal limb relative to the stifle suggests rupture of the collateral ligament. Sprain of these ligaments can be evaluated by repeating this test multiple times, before trotting the horse off an looking for lameness.

=== Evaluation of the hoof ===
The majority of lameness originates in the hoof. For this reason, the hoof is closely scrutinized in shape, balance, shoeing, wear pattern, and for the presence of cracks, and contracted or sheared heels.

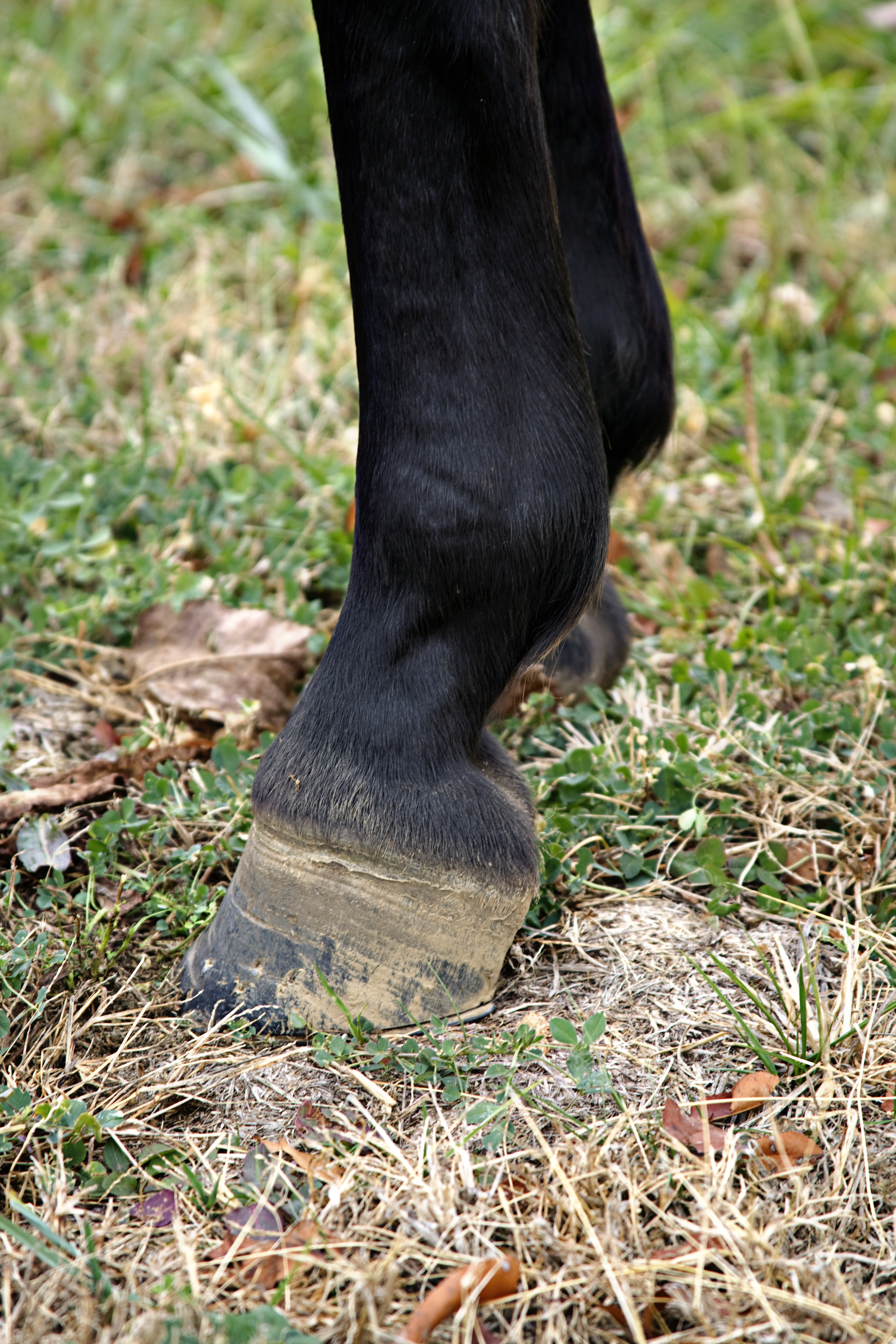
Chronic lameness often causes an upright hoof capsule.

Chronic lameness will change the shape of the hoof capsule, since the lame limb is not weighted as much as its partner, making the capsule more upright, narrow, with a higher heel on the lame limb and more flattened on the sound one. Hoof or horseshoe wear can indicate breakover and if the horse is dragging its toes. Change in shape of the hoof wall is also common in horses with laminitis. "Founder rings," or thickened concentric rings in the hoof wall, indicate a past episode of laminitis. Concavity of the dorsal (front) surface of the hoof can indicate chronic laminitis. The sole may become convex if the coffin bone begins to push through the bottom of the hoof.

Correct hoof balance allows for even distribution of forces through the leg and hoof. Poor hoof balance, due to conformational flaws or poor trimming, can cause lameness from musculoskeletal injury, and poor hoof balance has been associated with increased risk of catastrophic injury in racehorses. Side-to-side (mediolateral) imbalance can cause sheared heals and hoof cracks. The hoof angle, or the angle of the hoof wall relative to the pastern, has been associated with health of the soft tissues of the lower leg. Long toes force the horse to pivot (break over) further forward over the toe. The toe acts as a lever arm, and its increased length makes it harder for the heels to rotate off the ground. This increases strain on the deep digital flexor tendon and the ligaments of the navicular bone.

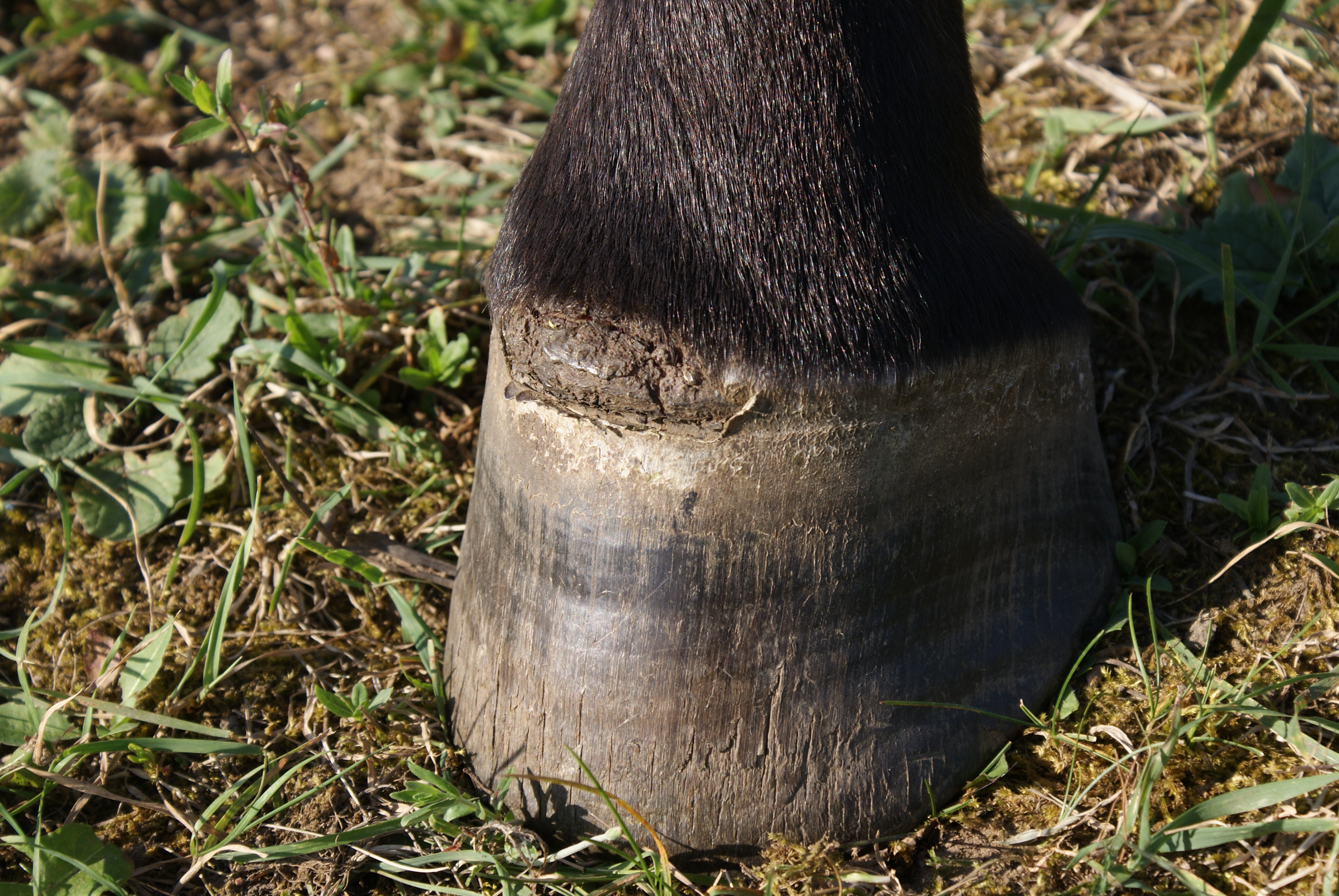
An abscess has ruptured out of the coronary band of this horse.

The bottom of the hoof should also be examined. The shape of the sole, size of the frog, and shape of the bars can indicate overall health of the hoof. Holes in heel bulb usually indicate a hoof abscess that has ruptured. The horse's shoeing can also provide clues to the examiner. The application of corrective shoes or pads may indicate past problems requiring special shoeing. This can be especially helpful during the pre-purchase exam, when the lameness history of the horse may not be readily available.

Digital pulse evaluation is important when addressing the hoof. An increased digital pulse often indicates that the lesion is in the foot, and are usually most significantly increased in horses with laminitis. The coronary band may also be palpated. Cool swelling can indicate coffin joint effusion, swelling with an increase in temperature can indicate laminitis, firm swelling can occur with ringbone, and a localized swelling with pain can indicate an abscess.

Examiners will also "hoof test" each foot by applying a metal instrument that squeezes the foot to test for deep pain. Diffuse sensitivity occurs with fracture or infection of the coffin bone, and laminitis. More localized sensitivity can be found with sole bruises, puncture wounds, hoof abscesses, and hot nails. Sensitivity over the middle third of the frog is consistent with navicular syndrome, but can also occur with sheared heels. To distinguish these two, the hoof testers may be applied over the heels, which will be sensitive in the case of any heel-related pain, such as sheared, contracted, or bruised heels. The hoof wall may also be percussed (struck with a hammer), which will produce a positive response in cases of hoof cracks that are causing the horse pain, laminitis, or a gravel (hoof abscess travelling up the hoof wall towards the coronary band).

=== Evaluation in motion ===
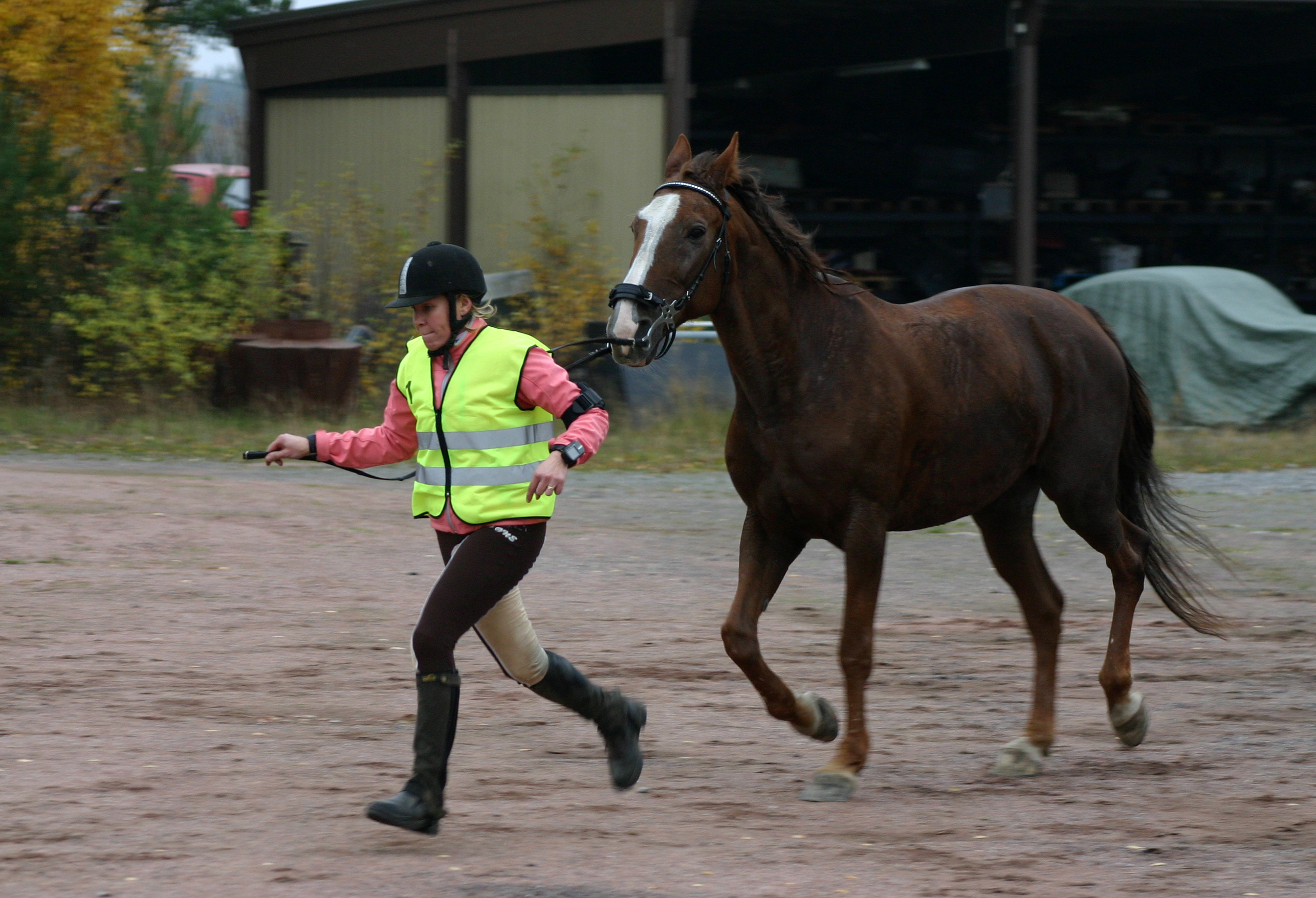
Horses are usually trotted on a straight line to evaluate lameness.

The horse is evaluated in motion, usually at the walk and trot, but occasionally also in the canter. The walk is often the best gait to evaluate foot placement. The trot is generally the best gait to localize the lameness to a particular leg, because it is a symmetrical gait where the front half of the horse and the back half move in unison. The canter may also be used for lameness evaluation. Resistance to picking up the canter or to engage the hind end can suggest pain in the sacro-iliac joint, pelvis, or hind leg.

Lameness may be accentuated under certain conditions. Therefore, the moving examination is often performed both in a straight line and on a circle, and may be repeated on different footings. Hard footing tends to make joint and bone injury more apparent, while soft, deep footings tend to accentuate soft tissue injury. Circles may accentuate a lameness when the lame leg is on the inside or outside of the circle.

At times, it may be helpful to evaluate the horse under saddle, since the weight of the rider can accentuate lameness. In cases of decreased performance, it can be useful to watch a horse performing certain discipline-specific movements, which may be the only time the rider notices a change in the horse's abilities.

Gait is evaluated for symmetry. This includes the overall fluidity of the horse's motion, length of stride, loading of a leg, how the hoof lands on the ground (flat, toe, or heel-first), range of motion of the joints, deviations in body position, and position of the head and neck.

The first evaluation of the horse is used to determine the severity of lameness and to help pinpoint which part of the body may be affected. The process of watching a horse move is repeated after each additional flexion test or nerve block to determine its effect on the animal.

=== Grading lameness ===
Lameness is graded on a scale. This allows the practitioner to help quantify a lameness in order to determine relative severity, assess the degree of change after flexion tests or nerve blocks, and to determine the improvement of lameness over time once treatment has been implemented. The most commonly used scale in the United States is a 1–-5 scale of the American Association of Equine Practitioners (AAEP). Other scales are more commonly used outside of the United States, including a 1–10 scale in the United Kingdom.

AAEP Lameness Grading Scale

- Grade 0: lameness is not perceptible under any circumstances
- Grade 1: lameness is difficult to observe and not consistently apparent under any circumstances
- Grade 2: the lameness is consistently apparent under certain circumstances (specific surfaces, on an incline, circling, under saddle, etc), but difficult to observe at a walk or trot on a straight line
- Grade 3: the lameness is consistently apparent at the trot under all circumstances
- Grade 4: the lameness is apparent at the walk
- Grade 5: the horse is minimally or non-weight bearing on the limb, or unable to move

Non-weight bearing lameness (grade 5) is most commonly the result of a hoof abscess. While very painful, most hoof abscesses are quite treatable and do not cause long-term lameness. However, fractures and septic synovial structures (such as an infected joint pouch or tendon sheath) can also cause non-weight bearing lameness, and require emergency evaluation and treatment by a veterinarian. Therefore, non-weight bearing lameness should be assessed by an equine professional in a timely manner, especially if it is associated with trauma, laceration, or recent joint injection.

=== Flexion tests ===
Flexion tests are a diagnostic tool involving the application of sustained pressure on a particular set of joints. The limb is forcibly flexed for between 30 seconds and 3 minutes, depending on the joint and practitioner preference, and the horse is immediately trotted off. An increase in lameness following a flexion test suggests that those joints or surrounding soft tissue structures may be a source of pain for the horse. Flexion tests help narrow down the source of lameness to a certain part of the leg, but they are non-specific because they almost always affect more than one joint and because they also affect the soft tissue structures around the joint, not just the joint itself. Additionally, they must be interpreted carefully due to the risk of false negatives and false positives.

=== Regional limb anesthesia (nerve blocks) ===
Nerve blocks involve injecting a small amount of local anesthetic around a nerve or into a synovial structure (such as a joint or tendon sheath) in order to block the perception of pain in a specific area. After the substance is injected, it is given a few minutes to take effect. The block is then tested by pushing a blunt object, such as a ballpoint pen, into the area that is supposed to be desensitized. If the horse does not react to this pressure, the area is desensitized, and the horse is trotted to see if the lameness has improved. Improvement indicates that the cause of lameness was from a structure desensitized by the nerve block.

Nerve blocks are performed in a step-wise fashion, beginning at the most distal (lower) part of the limb and moving upward. This is due to the fact that blocking a nerve higher up will desensitize everything it innervates distal to the blocking location. For example, blocking the leg at the level of the fetlock will also block the entire foot, since the nerve fibers that innervate the foot are inhibited when they travel through the fetlock area. A positive result from this block will not be able to differentiate foot pain from pain in the pastern or fetlock region. More information may be gained from blocking the foot first, then the fetlock, since it allows for greater specificity in determining the cause of lameness.

The duration of the anesthetic varies depending on the substance used. Lidocaine is especially short acting, and is therefore usually not used for lameness evaluations. The longer-acting anesthetic mepivacaine is most-commonly used for nerve blocks, because ideally the block should last throughout the lameness exam to avoid false positives with subsequent blocks as they are performed up the leg. Bupivicaine is very long-lasting (up to 4–6 hours), and is most commonly used for analgesia following surgery rather than for nerve blocks.

Although nerve blocks are very important to the lameness examination, they are not foolproof. Multiple studies have shown that the anesthetic can migrate, especially if the horse is evaluated long after blocking or if a large amount of anesthetic is used. If the anesthetic migrates to the structure that is causing the horse pain, the horse will have a positive block, and the examiner will conclude that the lameness originates in an area that is not actually causing the horse discomfort. False results can also be secondary to practitioner error if the anesthetic is accidentally administered into a location that was unintended, such as a synovial structure rather than around a nerve. Additionally, individual horses have variation in their neural anatomy, and if atypical patterns are present, a given block may block an area unintended by the examiner, leading to false positives. Joints present additional problems. A large volume of anesthetic placed into a joint can diffuse out over time, blocking the surrounding structures. Additionally, there are some cases where joint pain can respond better to perineural blocking rather than blocking of the joint.

=== Objective Lameness Detection and Localization ===
There is relatively low agreement between practitioners trying to identify a lame leg when lameness is mild using subjective visual cues. Additional methods of detection and quantification of lameness can therefore be helpful. Several systems are in use and under development for this purpose, both in research and clinical practice. Among these are the Lameness Locator system based on uniaxial accelerometers, the Equigate system based on six degrees of freedom inertial measurement units, the Equinalysis system, and the motion capture based Qhorse system

== Diagnostic tests ==
=== Radiographs and Ultrasound ===
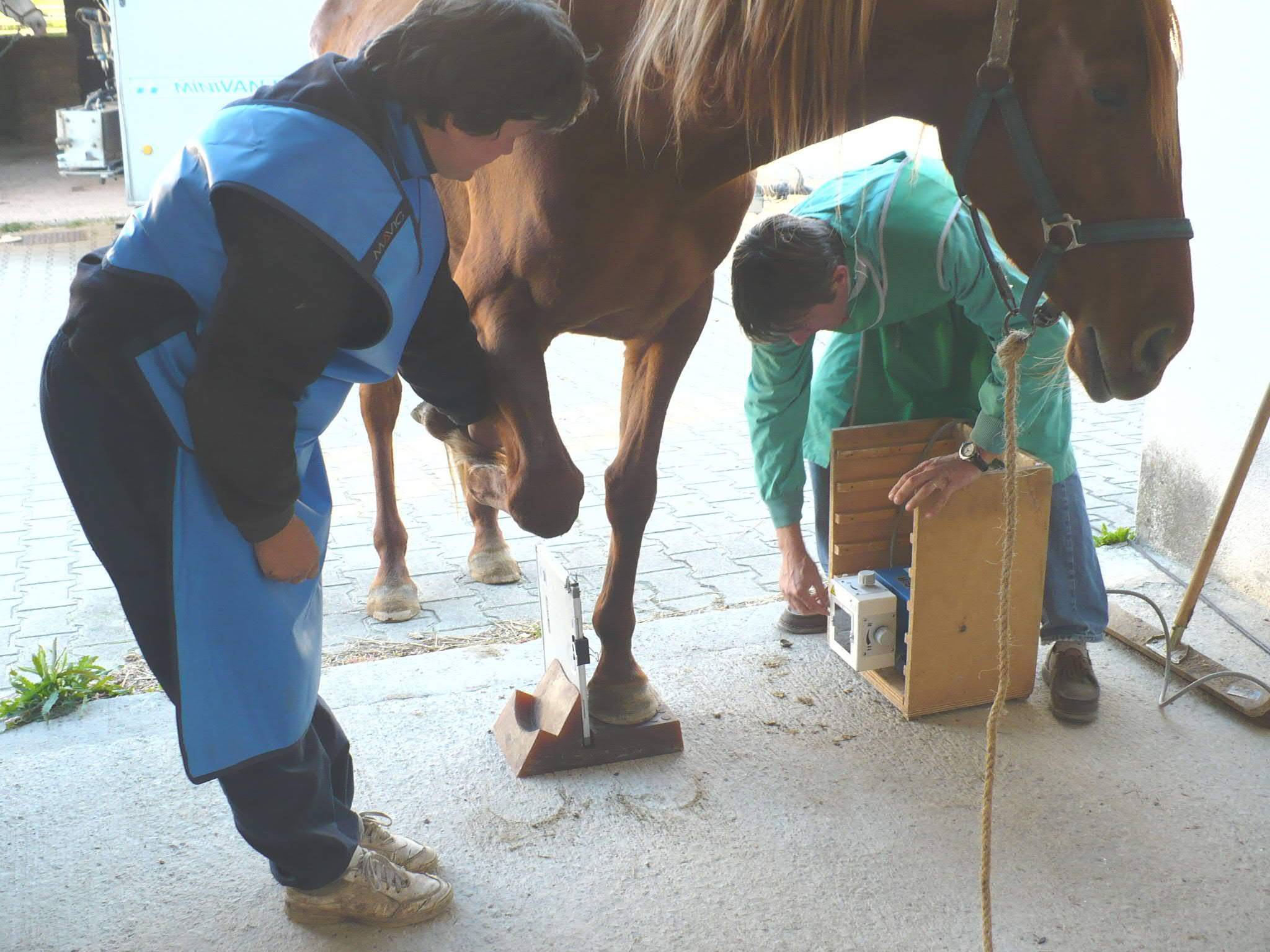
Radiographs are commonly used to evaluate lameness in the lower limb.

The most common forms of diagnostic imaging for use during a lameness exam are radiographs ("x-rays"), to evaluate bone and joint lesions, and ultrasound, to evaluate soft tissue lesions. These modalities are best applied if the general location of lameness is known from flexion tests and nerve blocks. These methods are both non-invasive and relatively cheap.

Radiographs ("x-rays") are made by photons, produced by a generator, that have hit a piece of x-ray film. This film is then exposed to produce an image. The photons that hit the film are actually those that have been reflected, rather than absorbed, by the animal's body. Different tissue types absorb photons to varying degrees, leading to differing levels of darkness (radiodensity) on the x-ray film. An anatomical structure is delineated by comparing its radiodensity those tissues surrounding it. Interpretation of a radiograph therefore requires the surrounding structures to have enough of a difference in radiodensity to allow it to stand out. While this is obvious in tissue such as bone, soft tissues of the leg do not stand out well on radiographs. Therefore, radiographs are best used to evaluate boney changes rather than soft tissue damage. One exception of this rule is the use of contrast, injected into synovial structures, which allows these structures to stand out on radiographs. Common uses for radiographs are to evaluate for suspected fractures, bone chips, laminitis, and navicular changes.

Ultrasound measures the reflection of high frequency sound waves off of tissues. Different tissues absorb or reflect ultrasonic waves to different degrees, which may be picked up by the machine and turned into an image. Because ultrasound does not easily cross bone or air, it is best used for the evaluation of soft-tissue structures. It is therefore a complementary imaging modality to radiographs, and is most commonly used to look for injury to ligaments and tendons, and the navicular bursa, although muscle damage and arterial blood flow have also been evaluated with ultrasound in cases of lameness. Ultrasound is especially useful for determining the size and shape of lesions within structures, allowing quantification of an injury. Ultrasound may be used after diagnosis, to monitor the progression of healing of a lesion. It is also used to guide injections of treatments (steroids, stems cells, platelet rich plasma) directly into a lesion.

=== Nuclear Scintigraphy ===
Nuclear scintigraphy, or the "bone scan," involves injecting a radioactive substance, often technetium-99, into the horse and then measuring uptake, which is strongest in the areas of rapid bone remodeling. The bone scan is often useful for lameness that can't be easily localized to one area, that affects multiple limbs, or lameness that is thought to originate in areas not easily imaged by other means, such as the vertebral column. Although it provides localization for lameness, it does not give a definitive diagnosis. The availability of this modality is more limited relative to radiographs and ultrasound, and usually requires referral to a secondary care facility. Additionally, the horse must stay for a short period of time until it is no longer radioactive. It is relatively non-invasive, requiring an initial injection of the radioisotope, and sedation throughout the procedure.

The bone scan offers several advantages over traditional radiographs. In some cases, it may be more sensitive due to the fact that some lesions are only apparent on radiographs after they have become chronic. The bone scan allows imaging of the pelvis, vertebral column, and upper limbs, which are areas that are usually poorly imaged by radiographs on the adult horse, due to their size. It also allows some evaluation of soft tissue, which is generally not imaged well by radiographs.

=== Computed Tomography ===
Computed tomography (CT) is an imaging modality that produces a 3-dimensional radiograph. A series of plain radiographs are taken in a spiral around the site of interest, and the individual 2-D radiographs are converted into a 3D image by a computer. The image may be manipulated to view in different planes, such as cross-section, making it possible to see an injury from multiple perspectives and improving diagnostic capabilities when compared to plain radiographs. Like plain radiographs, CT is not as useful for soft tissue lesions when compared to boney lesions. However, CT requires general anesthesia, and is more costly and less available than plain radiographs, limiting its use in general practice. CT provides a large amount of data with exceptional speed, taking only seconds to minutes to complete. When compared to MRI, it is not only significantly faster (MRI takes 1–2 hours to produce an image), but also less expensive. Its combination of speed and imaging capabilities makes it beneficial for use prior to orthopedic surgery, especially in the case of complicated fractures, as it allows for visualization from all sides so that the surgeon may determine the best approach and method of correction prior to cutting. Upon completion of the CT, the horse may be rolled straight into the surgery suite for immediate surgical treatment. Advances in technology now also allows for a robotic scanner to rapidly image different parts the standing horse without the need for general anesthesia.

=== Magnetic Resonance Imaging (MRI) ===
Magnetic Resonance Imaging (MRI) produces a 3-dimensional image that allows for exceptional evaluation of soft tissue structures, as well as the detection of boney change and the presence of excessive fluid accumulation associated with inflammation. Like CT, an MRI image may be viewed in various planes of orientation, improving visualization of anatomic structures and any associated pathologic change. MRI is considered the gold standard for diagnosing soft tissue injury within the foot. While it can provide a definitive diagnosis in cases where other imaging modalities have failed, it does have several limitations. Available magnet size restricts imaging to the level of the stifle or elbow, or below. MRI takes a significant amount of time acquire an image, which translates to long anesthesia times and therefore reduces the size of the area that may be imaged in a single session. The area thought to be associated with lameness must be placed in the MRI. MRI is therefore inappropriate for any lameness that can not be localized to a specific region of the limb. Additionally, MRI has limited availability and high cost compared to the other imaging modalities.

Horses may undergo standing MRI, where the horse is sedated and imaged with a low-field magnet (0.27 tesla), or it may be placed in a high-field magnet (1.5 or 3 tesla) while under general anesthesia. Low-field magnets produce less resolution and the subtle swaying of the standing horse leads to motion artifact (blurring of the image), especially in the case of the knee or hock, leading to reduced image quality. However, standing MRI tends to be cheaper, and it eliminates the risks of general anesthesia, such as further damage to the injured area or additional injury that may occur during anesthetic recovery.

=== Thermography ===
Thermography, or thermal imaging, measures the heat gradient of skin by detection of infrared radiation. Because heat is a cardinal sign of inflammation, thermal imaging can be used to detect inflammation that may be the cause of lameness, and at times discover a subclinical injury. When used, horses must be placed in an area free of sunlight exposure, drafts, or other sources of outside heat, and hair length should be uniform in the area imaged. Benefits include non-invasiveness and the potential for early identification of injury, and detection of early contralateral limb injury in the case of orthopedic patients.

=== Blood or synovial fluid testing ===
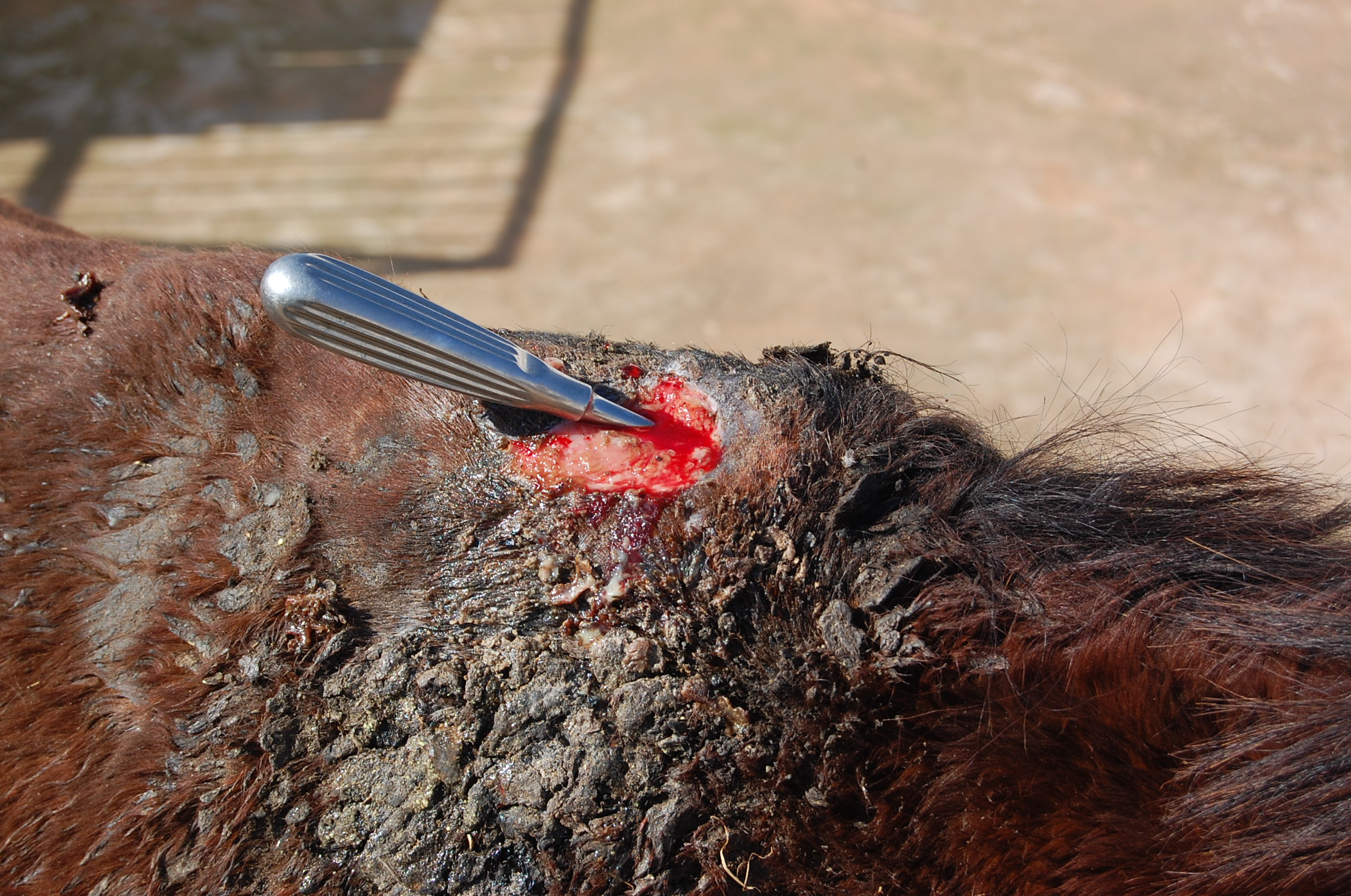
Infection of synovial structures, such as in fistulous withers, should be cultured.

Blood and synovial fluid may be tested for pathogens in the case of infected synovial structures. Both cytology and bacterial culture can be used to help identify the cause of infection. In adult horses, septic arthritis or tenosynovitis are most commonly seen secondary to joint injection, penetrating injury, or following surgery, and are often from Staphylococcus infection. Foals often develop septic arthritis secondary to systemic infection and hematogenous spread to the joints.

=== Arthroscopy ===
Arthroscopy involves placing a small camera through a hole into a joint or other synovial structure. It requires general anesthesia, but allows thorough visualization of the synovial membrane and articular cartilage. Treatment may often be performed at the same time. Arthroscopy is most commonly used for chip fractures of the knee and fetlock joints, osteochondritis dessecans lesions, and proliferative synovitis.

=== Body-Mounted Inertial Sensor Systems ===
Inertial Sensor Systems (ISS) generally refer to wireless inertial sensors (accelerometers and gyroscopes) transmitting precision movement data back to a computer. Asymmetry of motion can be measured using ISS attached to the horse's body. A computer application then quantifies lameness by measuring the asymmetry of movement between left and right sides of the body. Some more sophisticated computer applications are able to determine the limb or limbs involved and the point in the stride cycle that the horse is differentially unloading the limb.

== Treatment ==
Appropriate treatment for lameness depends on the condition diagnosed, but at a minimum it usually includes rest or decreased activity and anti-inflammatory medications. Other treatment options, such as corrective shoeing, joint injections, and regenerative therapies, are pursued based on the cause of lameness and the financial limits of the owner. Consultation with a veterinarian is generally recommended, even for mild cases, as some types of lameness may worsen if not properly diagnosed and treated.

== Horseman’s terms for lameness or blemishes ==
Various horseman's terms have evolved over the years to describe common lamenesses or blemishes (defects that do not cause lameness) in horses.

- Bog spavin: excessive synovial fluid in the tarsocrural joint, which leads to a large, soft, cool distention on the dorsal surface of the hock.
- Bone spavin: osteoarthritis of the distal hock joints, which produces lameness and is sometimes seen as a visible, hard swelling on the inside of the hock joint.

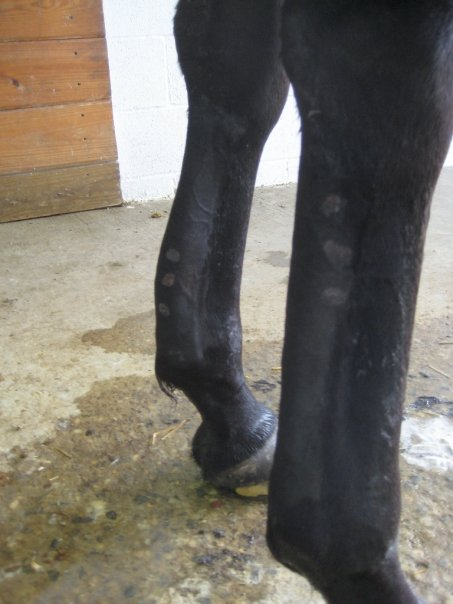
A horse with bowed tendons

- Bowed tendon: tendinitis of the superficial or deep digital flexor tendons, which leads to a "bowed" appearance when the tendon is seen in profile. Considered a lameness when acute, and a blemish once healed, although the tendon is at greater risk for re-injury.
- Bucked shins: pain, heat, and swelling over the dorsal surface of the cannon bone most commonly seen in racehorses. This complex disease process, called "dorsal metacarpal disease," involves inflammation of the periosteum, subperiosteal hematoma, and microfractures to the cortex of the underlying bone.

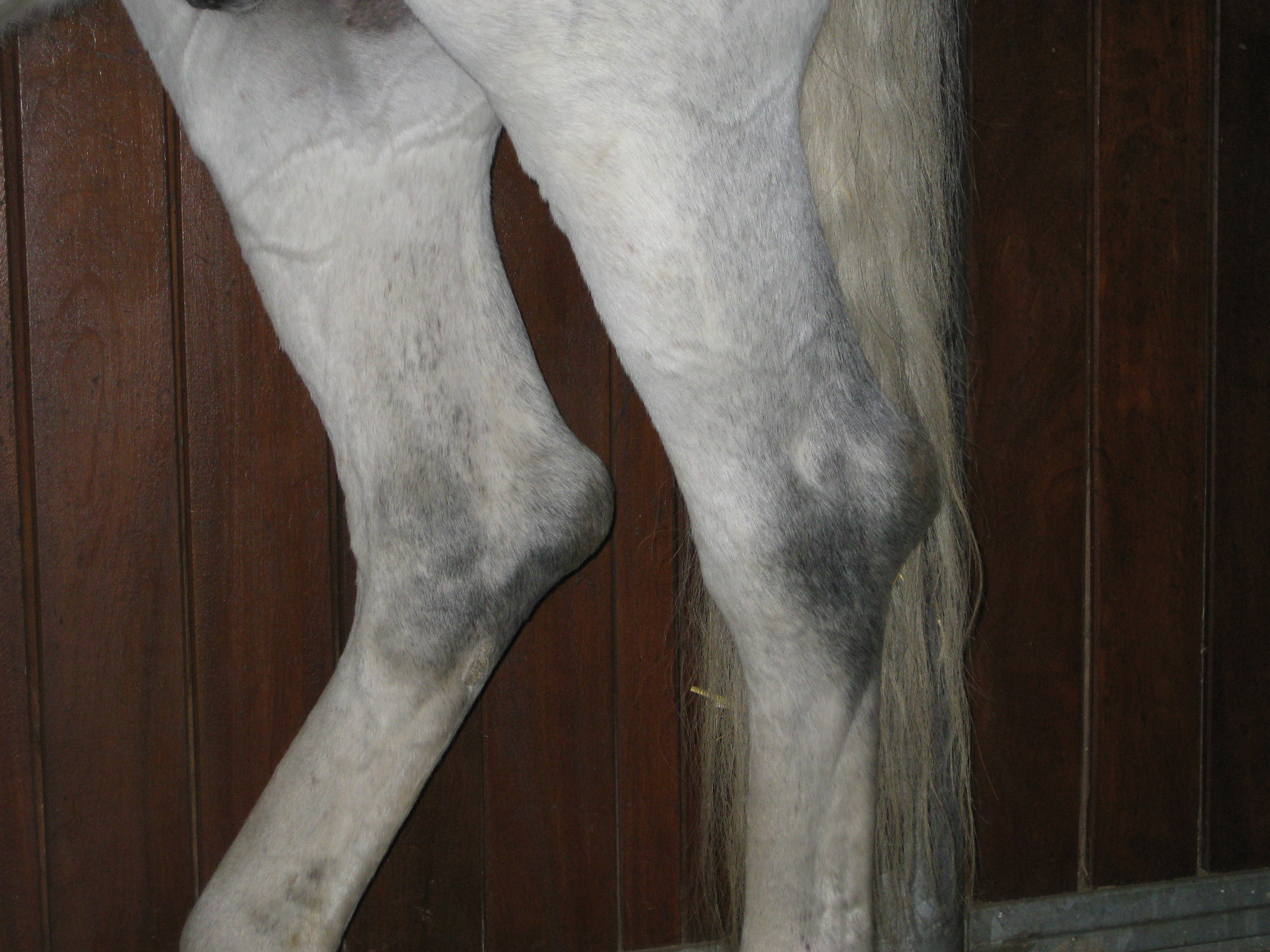
Capped hocks

- Capped joint: Inflammation leading to the development of a "false" or acquired bursa over the point of the elbow (capped elbow, also known as a "shoe boil"), point of the hock (capped hock), or knee (capped knee, or carpal hygroma) which causes an obvious swelling in the area. These are generally considered blemishes.
- Curb: a thickening or bowing on the caudal surface of the calcaneus. Classically associated with damage to the long plantar tarsal ligament of the hock, it is actually most commonly due to injury to the superficial digital flexor tendon, but may also involve the deep digital flexor tendon, or the surrounding soft tissue structures.
- Founder: often used interchangeably with laminitis, although technically a severe form of the condition. Laminitis is an inflammatory condition of the support structures of the hoof which suspends the bony column
- Gravel: abscessation within the hoof capsule typically originating at the solar surface.
- Navicular disease or navicular syndrome: a catch-all phrase used to describe pain in the palmar hoof which was originally attributed to damage to the navicular bone. MRI has since shown that navicular syndrome may be caused by damage to any of the structures within the hoof, including the navicular bone, the navicular bursa, the coffin joint, the deep digital flexor tendon, and various ligamentous supportive structures.
- Osselets: swelling on the front surface of the fetlock joints of the front legs, caused by traumatic arthritis of the fetlock joints.
- Ringbone: boney proliferation around the pastern. May be articular (osteoarthritis) or non-articular. The articular forms can affect the pastern or coffin joints, and can cause lameness.
- Shoe boil: see "capped joint"
- Sidebone: ossification of the collateral cartilages of the hoof secondary to chronic concussion, may be palpated on just above the coronary band on either side of the hoof. Rarely causes lameness, therefore considered a blemish.
- Splints: bony enlargements in the area of the splint bone, most commonly on the inside of the front leg, but sometimes on the outside of the front leg or on a hind leg. They are caused by trauma to the split bone itself or the ligament between the splint bone and cannon bone. Acutely, there may be no visible swelling but the horse will be painful on palpation, and lame. Once healed, the boney swelling is cool to the touch and considered a blemish.
- Stocking up: Edema (fluid) retained in the lower legs due to reduced lymphatic drainage, often because the horse is sedentary for long periods (such as when stalled) but occasionally due to pathology. It is cool to the touch, and usually decreases or resolves with exercise. It is considered a blemish.
- Sweeney (shoulder sweeny): a loss of muscle of the shoulder. It is due to atrophy of the supraspinatous and infraspinatus muscles, secondary to damage to the suprascapular nerve, which innervates these muscles. It is usually caused by trauma, and is relatively rare in present day.
- Thoroughpin: effusion in the deep digital flexor tendon sheath, producing a small fluid swelling in the depression just front of the calcaneous. It is proximal to the tarsocrural joint, which helps distinguish it from bog spavin.
- Windpuffs (wind galls): cool, soft effusions in the area of the fetlock joint. May be "articular windgalls," which are the result of excessive synovial fluid in the fetlock joint capsule and located on the inside and outside of the fetlock, just behind the bones of the joint. Swelling towards the back of the joint are "tendonous windgalls," and are the result of effusion in the deep digital flexor tendon sheath. Windgalls are considered blemishes.

== See also ==
- Equine conformation
- Skeletal system of the horse
- Equine anatomy
- Horse hoof
- Horse care
- Flexion test
- Equine prepurchase exam
