= Flexion test =

A flexion test is a preliminary veterinary procedure performed on a horse, generally during a prepurchase or a lameness exam. The purpose is to accentuate any pain that may be associated with a joint or soft-tissue structure, allowing the practitioner to localize a lameness to a specific area, or to alert a practitioner to the presence of sub-clinical disease that may be present during a pre-purchase exam.

== Performing a flexion test ==
The animal's leg is held in a flexed position for 30 seconds to up to 3 minutes (although most veterinarians do not go longer than a minute), and then the horse is immediately trotted off and its gait is analyzed for abnormalities and unevenness. Flexions stretch the joint capsule, increase intra-articular and subchondral bone pressure, and compress surrounding soft tissue structures, which accentuates any pain associated with these structures.

An increase in lameness following a flexion test suggests that those joints or surrounding soft tissue structures may be a source of pain for the horse. The horse may take a few uneven steps, or may be lame for several minutes following the procedure. Flexion tests are considered positive if lameness is increased, although usually lameness is forgiven for the first few steps following flexion. The horse's response should be graded with each flexion and recorded. This allows comparison in lameness when rechecking after treatment has been implemented.

In addition to watching for lameness in the flexed limb, the examiner also looks for lameness in the standing, contralateral (opposite) limb. An increase in lameness associated with the contralateral limb can suggest certain causes pain, such as bilateral hock or carpal disease.

=== Distal limb flexion ===
The distal (lower) limb flexion applies the most pressure to the fetlock, pastern, and coffin joints. This flexion is usually performed by pulling the toe of the hoof backward towards the cannon bone, and holding sustained pressure on the joints. The fetlock and phalanges may be somewhat isolated by changing technique, but these joints are never completely isolated from the others, especially in the hind limbs. False positive results from this flexion are especially common in the front fetlock joints.

=== Carpal flexion ===
The carpal (knee) flexion test is performed by pulling the cannon bone up towards the radius. In a normal horse, the heels of the foot should contact the animal's elbow. Positive results are usually strongly supportive of carpal disease, but negative results do not rule it out.

=== Elbow flexion ===
Elbow flexion is usually only performed when joint abnormality is found during physical examination. Flexion may be performed by lifting the forelimb (antebrachium) so that it is parallel to the ground, while allowing the knee and distal limb to hang free to help prevent pressure on these joints. Unfortunately, elbow flexion often produces some flexion in the shoulder, and these joints are difficult to localize.

=== Upper forelimb flexion ===
There are two main methods of upper forelimb flexion. The first method involves pulling the limb forward, so that the elbow flexes and the shoulder extends. This method tends to place more strain on the structures of the caudal elbow and cranial shoulder, and is best at localizing lameness to the bicipital bursa or the supraglenoid tubercle of the scapula, but also places strain on the biceps and triceps and the olecranon. The alternative method involves pulling the limb caudally, which flexes the shoulder and extends the elbow.

=== Hock flexion ===
Hock flexion is almost always accompanied by flexion of the fetlock, stifle, and hip joints, so a positive flexion does not clearly indicate hock pain. A very marked response is actually more common with stifle pain, rather than hock pain. The flexion is performed by pulling the cannon bone upward so that the upper joints of the leg flex, while avoiding flexion of the fetlock joint or significant pressure on the flexor tendons.

A flexion test that produces lameness on the contralateral, standing limb usually occurs with sacroiliac disease.

=== Navicular wedge test ===
The navicular wedge test is used to localize any cause of lameness in the heel of the hoof. A wedge is placed directly under the frog, which applies pressure to the frog. A second method, involving placing the hoof on a wedge so the toe is lifted up relative to the heel, subsequently increases deep digital flexor tendon tension and pressure on the navicular bone. In both cases, the opposite limb is held off the ground to force weight onto the affected limb. The horse is held in this position for 1 minute, then trotted off as in other flexion tests.

== Problems with flexion tests ==
Flexion tests are rather nonspecific, as each test flexes multiple joints. So while they can help localize a lameness issue to one particular leg, or even to a few joints in the leg, they can not pinpoint it. Additionally, flexion tests affect not only the joints that are being flexed, but also the surrounding soft tissue structures around the joint.

Flexion tests may also produce false positives and false negatives. Both the force applied and the time a flexion test is performed can affect outcome. For this reason, it is best if the same person performs flexions of a joint on both legs, and for the same amount of time, to help standardize the response. The degree of lameness can increase significantly with repeated flexions. Certain areas, such as tissues of the fetlock joint, are more sensitive to flexion tests over other tissues, such as those in the pastern and hoof. The flexion test is less useful to evaluate for subclinical joint disease, since a significant number of sound, unaffected horses can produce slightly positive results.

Additionally, forelimb flexion tests have been shown to have poor predictive value for future soundness or unsoundness, and are best interpreted in cases of clinical lameness, joint effusion, reduced range of motion, or pain on palpation. Unfortunately, a positive response to forelimb flexion tests is one reason horses may be deemed unsuitable for purchase during the prepurchase exam. The wide range of significance attributed to these tests varies according to opinion and the experience of the examiner. While there have been many purchase exams discontinued solely because a positive response to a flexion test in one or both forelimbs, there's really nothing in the veterinary literature to support such an action. Due to the variable response to the test depending on such things as the force applied, duration of the test, age of the horse and the day of examination, discontinuation of a prepurchase examination based solely on a failed forelimb flexion test is probably unwarranted.
