= Judge Sweeney =

Judge Sweeney may refer to:

- Charlotte Sweeney (born 1969), judge of the United States District Court for the District of Colorado
- George Clinton Sweeney (1895–1966), judge of the United States District Court for the District of Massachusetts
- James R. Sweeney II (born 1961), judge of the United States District Court for the Southern District of Indiana
- Margaret M. Sweeney (born 1955), judge of the United States Court of Federal Claims

== See also ==
- Justice Sweeney (disambiguation)
