= Ringbone =

Chronic joint disease of hoofed animals

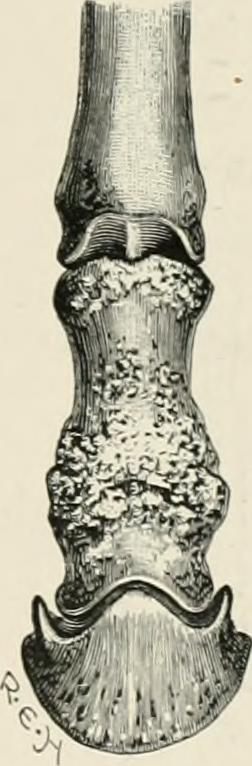
Drawing of a ringbone on both pastern and coffin joints

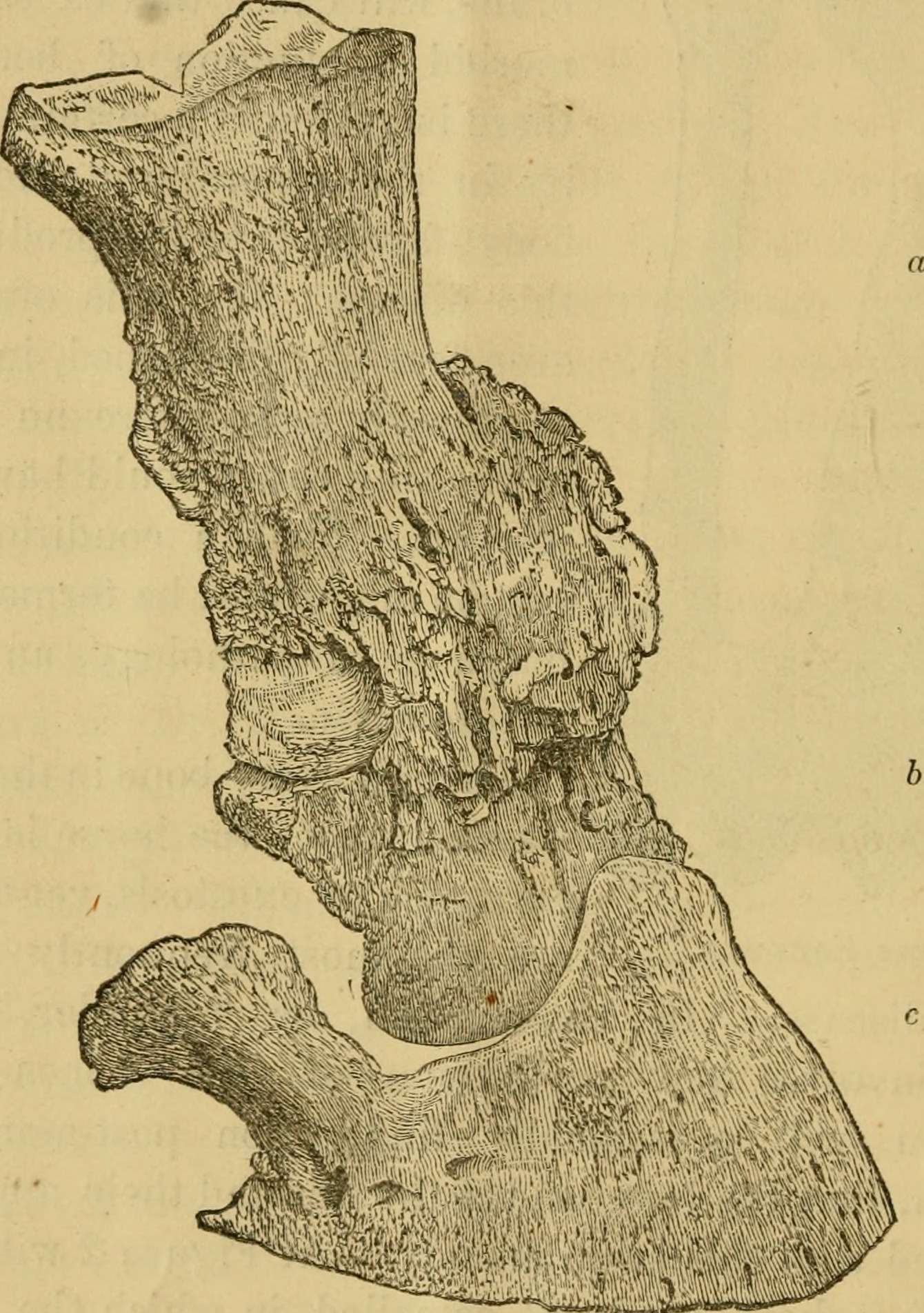
Drawing of a ringbone, advanced stage

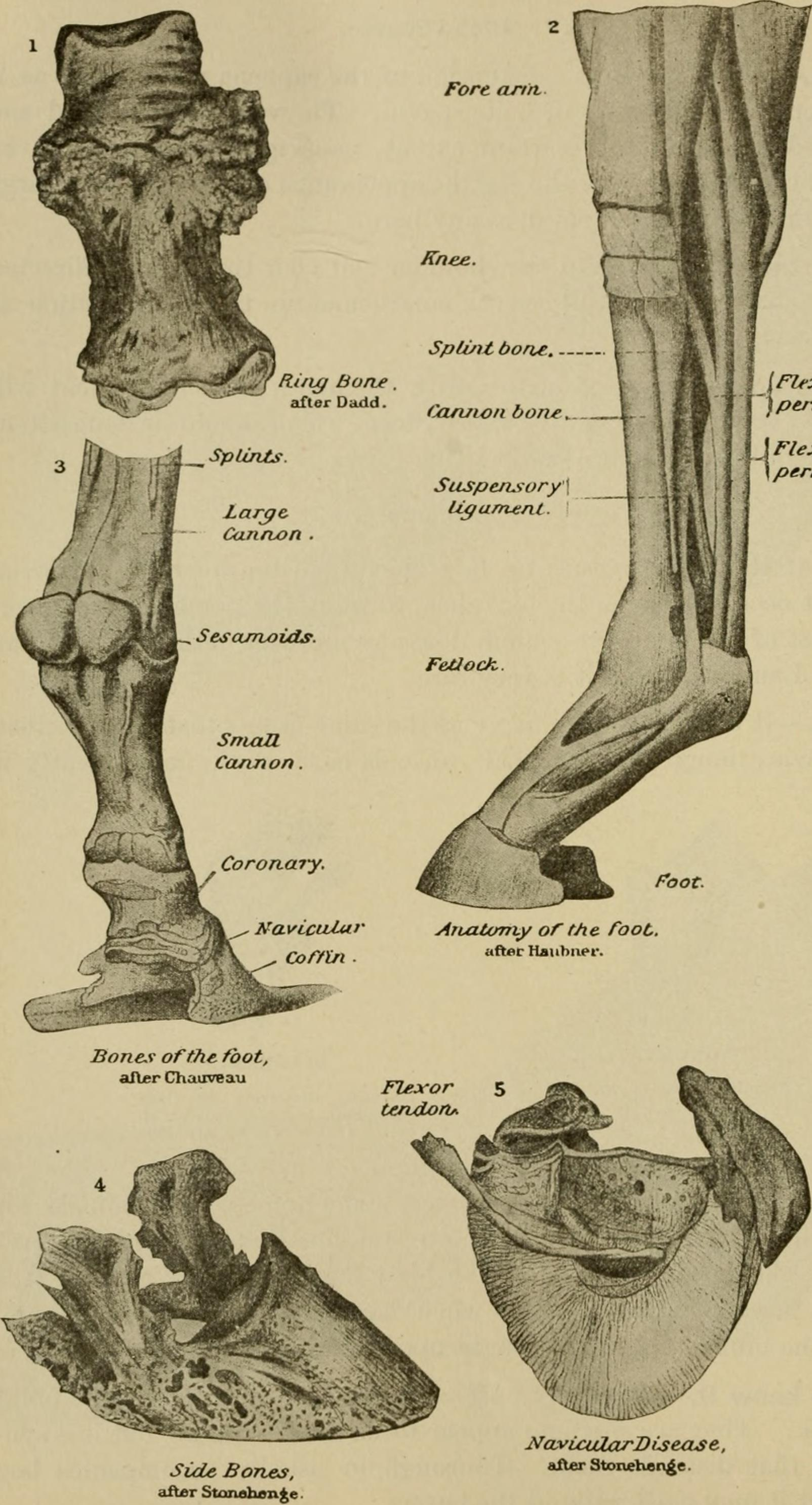
Drawing of lower leg bone disorders, ringbone in the upper left side

Ringbone is exostosis (bone growth) in the pastern or coffin joint of a horse. In severe cases, the growth can encircle the bones, giving ringbone its name. It has been suggested by some authors that such a colloquial term, whilst commonly used, might be misleading and that it would be better to refer to this condition as osteoarthritis of the inter-phalangeal joints in ungulates

Ringbone can be classified by its location, with "high ringbone" occurring at the level of the pastern joint (proximal interphalangeal joint), and by whether it directly involves the joint or not (articular ringbone, non-articular ringbone). "Low ringbone" occurs at the level of the coffin joint (distal interphalangeal joint). "High ringbone" is easier seen than low ringbone, as low ringbone occurs in the hoof of the horse. However, low ringbone may be seen if it becomes serious, as it creates a bony prominence on the coronet of the horse.

== Causes ==
- Osteoarthritis (the endstage of degenerative joint disease) of the pastern or coffin joint is the primary cause of articular ringbone. Bone is then produced to try to immobilize the joint and to relieve the chronic inflammation of the joint capsule. This process may take years, and lameness will continue until the joint is completely immobilized. Although most cases of arthritis do not form noticeable bone growth, the term "ringbone" is typically still used as a colloquial term.
- Poor shoeing and conformation, such as long-toes with low heels, pigeon toes, splay foot, or unbalanced feet may predispose the horse to ringbone, as they create uneven stress on the pastern and coffin joint, unequal tension on the soft tissues, or worsen the concussion that is absorbed by the pastern area.
- Trauma to the periosteum can cause bone growth on the pastern bone resulting in non-articular ringbone. However, this is usually not progressive unless nearby soft tissue has also been harmed and thus the joint instability is affected.
- Traumatic strain on the tendons, ligaments, and joint capsules of the pastern area can strain the periosteum at insertion sites, causing new bone growth at the stress point(s) (enthesophytosis), resulting in non-articular ringbone. If these tissues are stretched or torn, and the joint is destabilized by the injury, articular ringbone may also develop.

== Signs ==
Ringbone usually occurs in the front legs but can also be in the hind legs, and is usually worse in one leg than the other. Ringbone is most often found in mature horses, especially those in intensive training.

High ringbone: The horse will have a bony growth around the pastern area, and the pastern will have less mobility. The horse will show pain when the pastern joint is moved or rotated. Early cases will have a lameness score of 1-2 out of 5, with little or no bony swelling seen, although possibly felt when compared to the opposite pastern. Lameness will worsen to a grade 2–3 on a scale of 5 as the ringbone worsens.

Low ringbone: The horse will have moderate lameness (grade 2–3), even in early cases, because of the closeness of the ringbone to the other structures in the hoof. When severe or very advanced, the bony growth will be able to be seen on the coronet.

== Treatment ==
Ringbone is degenerative (unless it is caused by direct trauma). Treatment works to slow down the progress of the bony changes and alleviate the horse's pain, rather than working to cure it.

Hoof care: The farrier should ensure proper medial-lateral balance as well as hoof-pastern axis. If a shoe is applied, ensuring eased breakover at the toe as well as through the quarters is helpful. Full roller motion shoes are sometimes used for this purpose.

NSAIDs: or non-steroidal anti-inflammatory drugs help to alleviate the pain and reduce inflammation within and around the joints. NSAIDs may decrease pain enough to continue ridden work, which is good for the horse's overall health, but do not slow the progression of disease.

Joint injections: The pastern joint can be injected directly, typically with a form of corticosteroid and hyaluronic acid, or with a variety of other non-steroidal orthobiologics.

Extracorporeal shockwave therapy: A high-intensity specialized percussion device can help to remodel new bone tissue and decrease pain.

Arthrodesis: the surgical fusion of the two bones of the pastern joints eliminates the instability of the joint, and thus the inflammation. This procedure may then eliminate the horse's lameness as well. However, surgical alteration of the joint can promote the growth of bone in the area, which is cosmetically displeasing. Arthrodesis of the coffin joint is usually not performed due to the location of the joint (within the hoof) and because the coffin joint needs some mobility for the horse to move correctly (unlike the pastern joint, which has a limited range of motion). This procedure is typically reserved for cases no longer responsive to medical therapies

== Prognosis ==
The prognosis for continued athletic use is not as good for articular ringbone as it is for non-articular reingbone. Ringbone that is progressing rapidly has a poorer prognosis as well.

Horses that are not performing strenuous work, such as jumping or working at speed, will probably be usable for years to come. However, horses competing in intense sports may not be able to continue at their previous level, as their pastern joints are constantly stressed.
