= Laminitis =

Disease of the feet of hooved animals

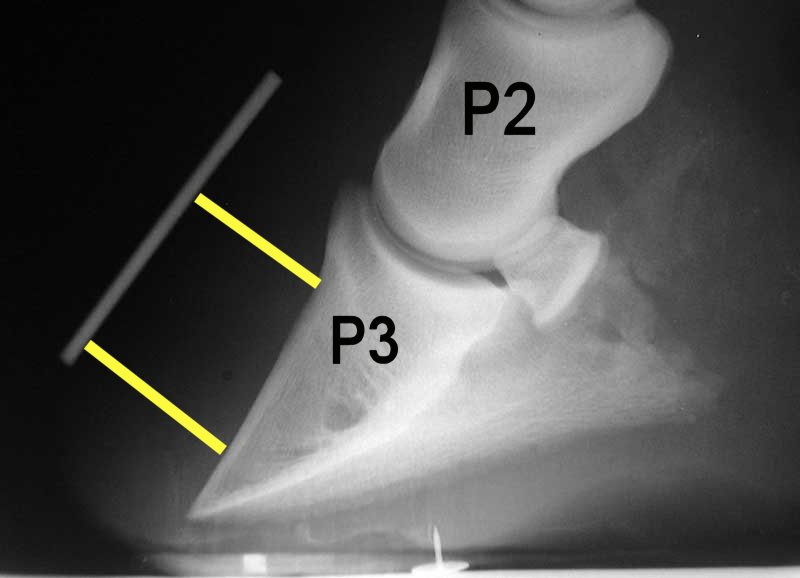
Radiograph of a horse hoof showing marked separation of the hoof from the coffin bone with evidence of rotation and sinking, compatible with active severe laminitis. P2 designates the middle phalanx, or pastern bone, and P3 designates the distal phalanx, or coffin bone. The yellow lines mark the distance between the top and bottom part of the coffin bone relative to the hoof wall, showing marked widening of the hoof-lamellar zone, with the distal (bottom) of the coffin bone rotated away from the hoof wall.

Laminitis is a disease of the feet of ungulates, found mostly in horses and cattle, involving inflammation of the laminae. Clinical signs include foot tenderness progressing to inability to walk, increased digital pulses, and increased temperature in the hooves. Severe cases with outwardly visible clinical signs are known by the colloquial term founder, and progression of the disease will lead to perforation of the coffin bone through the sole of the hoof or being unable to stand up, often requiring euthanasia.

== Laminae ==
The bones of the hoof are suspended within the hooves of ungulates by layers of modified skin cells, known as laminae or lamellae, which suspend the bony column from the hoof wall, contributing to shock absorption during locomotion. In horses, there are about 550–600 pairs of primary epidermal laminae, each with 150–200 secondary laminae projecting from their surface. These interdigitate with equivalent structures attached to the surface of the coffin bone (PIII, P3, the third phalanx, pedal bone, or distal phalanx), known as dermal laminae. The secondary laminae contain basal cells which attach via hemidesmosomes to the basement membrane. The basement membrane is then attached to the coffin bone via the connective tissue of the dermis.

== Pathophysiology ==
Laminitis literally means inflammation of the laminae, and while it remains controversial whether this is the primary mechanism of disease, evidence of inflammation occurs very early in some instances of the disease. A severe inflammatory event is thought to damage the basal epithelial cells, resulting in dysfunction of the hemidesmosomes and subsequent reduction in adherence between the epithelial cells and the basement membrane. Normal forces placed on the hoof are then strong enough to tear the remaining laminae, resulting in a failure of the interdigitation of the epidermal and dermal laminae between the hoof wall and the coffin bone. When severe enough, this results in displacement of the coffin bone within the hoof capsule. Most cases of laminitis occur in both front feet, but laminitis may be seen in all four feet, both hind feet, or in cases of support limb laminitis, in a single foot.

=== Mechanism ===
The mechanism remains unclear and is the subject of much research. Three conditions are thought to cause secondary laminitis:

- Sepsis/endotoxemia or generalized inflammation
- Endocrinopathy
- Trauma: concussion or excessive weight-bearing

==== Inflammation ====
Inflammatory events that are associated with laminitis include sepsis, endotoxemia, retained placenta, carbohydrate overload (excessive grain or pasture), enterocolitis, pleuropneumonia, and contact with black walnut shavings. In these cases, there is an increase in blood flow to the hoof, bringing in damaging substances and inflammatory cells into the hoof.

==== Endocrinopathy ====
Endocrinopathy is usually the result of improper insulin regulation, and is most commonly seen with pituitary pars intermedia dysfunction (also called equine Cushing's syndrome) and equine metabolic syndrome (EMS), as well as obesity and glucocorticoid administration. In cases of EMS, most episodes occur in the spring when the grass is lush.

==== Trauma ====
Mechanical laminitis starts when the hoof wall is pulled away from the bone or lost, as a result of external influences. Mechanical laminitis can occur when a horse habitually paws, is ridden or driven on hard surfaces ("road founder"), or in cases of excessive weight-bearing due to compensation for the opposing limb, a process called support limb laminitis. Support limb laminitis is most common in horses suffering from severe injury to one limb, such as fracture, resulting in a non-weight bearing state that forces them to take excessive load on the opposing limb. This causes decreased blood flow to the cells, decreasing oxygen and nutrient delivery, and thus altering their metabolism which results in laminitis.

=== Theories ===
==== Matrix metalloproteinases ====
One of the newest theories for the molecular basis of laminitis involves matrix metalloproteinases (MMPs). Metalloproteinases are enzymes that can degrade collagen, growth factors, and cytokines to remodel the extracellular matrix of tissues. To prevent tissue damage, they are regulated by tissue inhibitors of metalloproteinases (TIMPs). In cases of laminitis, an underlying cause is thought to cause an imbalance of MMPs and TIMPs, favoring MMPs, so that they may cleave substances within the extracellular matrix and therefore break down the basement membrane. Since the basement membrane is the main link between the hoof wall and the connective tissue of P3, it is thought that its destruction results in their separation. MMP-2 and MMP-9 are the primary enzymes thought to be linked to laminitis.

==== Theories for development ====
There are multiple theories as to how laminitis develops. These include:

- Enzymatic and inflammatory theories: The enzymatic theory postulates that increased blood flow to the foot brings in inflammatory cytokines or other substances to the hoof, where they increase production of MMPs, which subsequently break down the basement membrane. The inflammatory theory states that inflammatory mediators produce inflammation, but recognizes that MMP production occurs later. Therefore, this is possibly a 2-step process, beginning with inflammation and leading to MMP production and subsequent laminitis.
- Vascular theory: Postulates that increases in capillary pressure, constriction of veins, and shunting of blood through anastomoses to bypass the capillaries, causes decreased blood and therefore decreased oxygen and nutrient delivery to lamellae. The end-result would be ischemia, leading to cellular death and breakdown between the lamellae. Subsequently, increased vascular permeability leads to edema within the hoof, compression of small vessels, and ischemia. Vasoactive amines may be partially to blame for changes in hoof blood flow.
- Metabolic theory: Insulin affects multiple processes within the body, including inflammation, blood flow, and tissue remodeling. Change in insulin regulation may lead to laminitis. Hyperinsulinemia has been shown to cause increased length of the secondary lamellae and epidermal cell proliferation.
- Traumatic theory: Concussion is thought to directly damage lamellae, and increased weight-bearing is thought to decrease blood supply to the foot.

=== Rotation, sinking, and founder ===
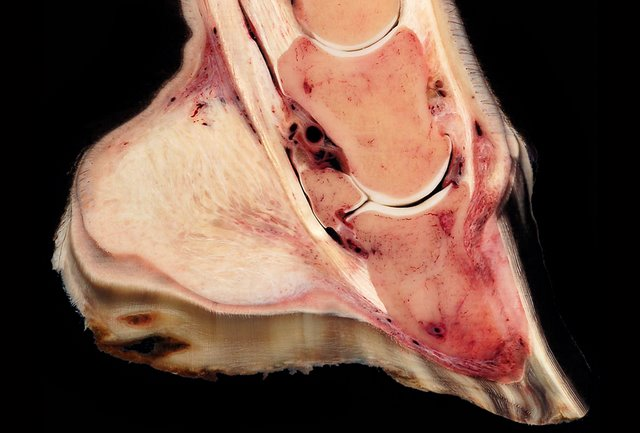
Hoof sagittal section with widespread laminiar inflammation and rotation of third phalanx

Normally, the front of the third phalanx is parallel to the hoof wall and its lower surface should be roughly parallel to the ground surface. A single severe laminitic episode or repeated, less severe episodes can, depending upon the degree of separation of dermal and epidermal laminae, lead to either rotation and/or sinking of the pedal bone, both of which result in anatomical changes in the position of the coffin bone with visible separation of the laminae, colloquially known as founder. Both forms of displacement may lead to the coffin bone penetrating the sole. Penetration of the sole is not inherently fatal; many horses have been returned to service by aggressive treatment by a veterinarian and farrier, but the treatment is time-consuming, difficult and expensive.

Rotation is the most common form of displacement, and, in this case, the tip of the coffin bone rotates downward. The degree of rotation may be influenced by the severity of the initial attack and the time of initiation and aggressiveness of treatment. A combination of forces (e.g. the tension of the deep digital flexor tendon and the weight of the horse) result in the deep digital flexor tendon literally pulling the dorsal face of the coffin bone away from the inside of the hoof wall, which allows the coffin bone to rotate. Also, ligaments attaching the collateral cartilages to the digit, primarily in the palmar portion of the foot, possibly contribute to a difference in support from front to back. The body weight of the animal probably contributes to rotation of the coffin bone. Rotation results in an obvious misalignment between PII (the short pastern bone) and PIII (the coffin bone). If rotation of the third phalanx continues, its tip can eventually penetrate the sole of the foot.

Sinking is less common and much more severe. It results when a significant failure of the interdigitation between the sensitive and insensitive laminae around a significant portion of the hoof occurs. The destruction of the sensitive laminae results in the hoof wall becoming separated from the rest of the hoof, so that it drops within the hoof capsule. Sinking may be symmetrical, i.e., the entire bone moves distally, or asymmetric, where the lateral or medial aspect of the bone displaces distally. Pus may leak out at the white line or at the coronary band. In extreme cases, this event allows the tip to eventually penetrate the sole of the foot. A severe "sinker" usually warrants the gravest prognosis and may, depending upon many factors, including the quality of aftercare, age of the horse, diet and nutrition, skill, and knowledge and ability of the attending veterinarian and farrier(s), lead to euthanasia of the patient.

== Phases ==
Treatment and prognosis depend on the phase of the disease, with horses treated in earlier stages often having a better prognosis.

=== Developmental phase ===
The developmental phase is defined as the time between the initial exposure to the causative agent or incident, until the onset of clinical signs. It generally lasts 24–60 hours, and is the best time to treat a laminitis episode. Clinical laminitis may be prevented if cryotherapy (icing) is initiated during the developmental phase.

=== Acute phase ===
The acute phase is the first 72 hours following the initiation of clinical signs. Treatment response during this time determines if the horse will go into the subacute phase or chronic phase. Clinical signs at this time include bounding digital pulses, lameness, heat, and possibly response to hoof testing.

=== Subacute phase ===
The subacute phase occurs if there is minimal damage to the lamellae. Clinical signs seen in the acute phase resolve, and the horse becomes sound. The horse never shows radiographic changes, and there is no injury to the coffin bone.

=== Chronic phase ===
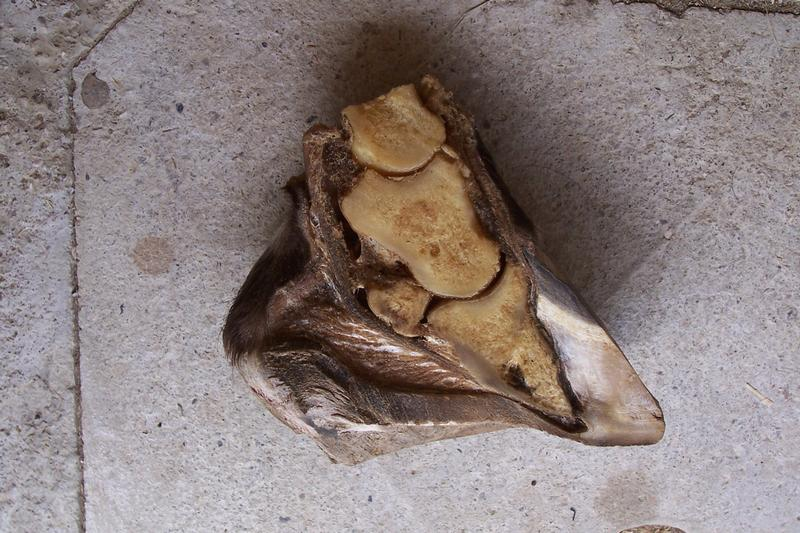
Hoof specimen, sagittal section. Severe P3 rotation and penetration into the sole. A lamellar wedge is evident.

The chronic phase occurs if damage to the lamellae is not controlled early in the process, so that the coffin bone displaces. Changes that may occur include separation of the dermal and epidermal lamellae, lengthening of the dermal lamellae, and compression of the coronary and solar dermis. If laminitis is allowed to continue, long-term changes such as remodeling of the apex and distal border of the coffin bone (so that a "lip" develops) and osteolysis of the coffin bone can occur.

The chronic phase may be compensated or uncompensated. Compensated cases will have altered hoof structure, including founder rings, wide white lines, and decreased concavity to the sole. Horses will be relatively sound. On radiographs, remodeling of the coffin bone and in cases of rotational displacement, the distal hoof wall will be thicker than that proximally. Venograms will have relatively normal contrast distribution, including to the apex and distal border of the coffin bone, and the coronary band, but "feathering" may be present at the lamellar "scar."

Uncompensated cases will develop a lamellar wedge (pathologic horn), leading to a poor bridge between P3 and the hoof capsule. This will lead to irregular horn growth and chronic lameness, and horses will suffer from laminitis "flares". Inappropriate hoof growth will occur: the dorsal horn will have a tendency to grow outward rather than down, the heels will grow faster than the toe, and the white line will widen, leading to a potential space for packing of debris. The solar dermis is often compressed enough to inhibit growth, leading to a soft, thin sole (<10 mm) that may develop seromas. In severe cases where collapse of the suspensory apparatus of P3 has occurred, the solar dermis or the tip of P3 may penetrate the sole. The horse will also be prone to recurrent abscessation within the hoof capsule. Venogram will show "feathering" into the vascular bed beneath the lamellae, and there will be decreased or absent contrast material in the area distal to the apex of the coffin bone.

== Causes ==
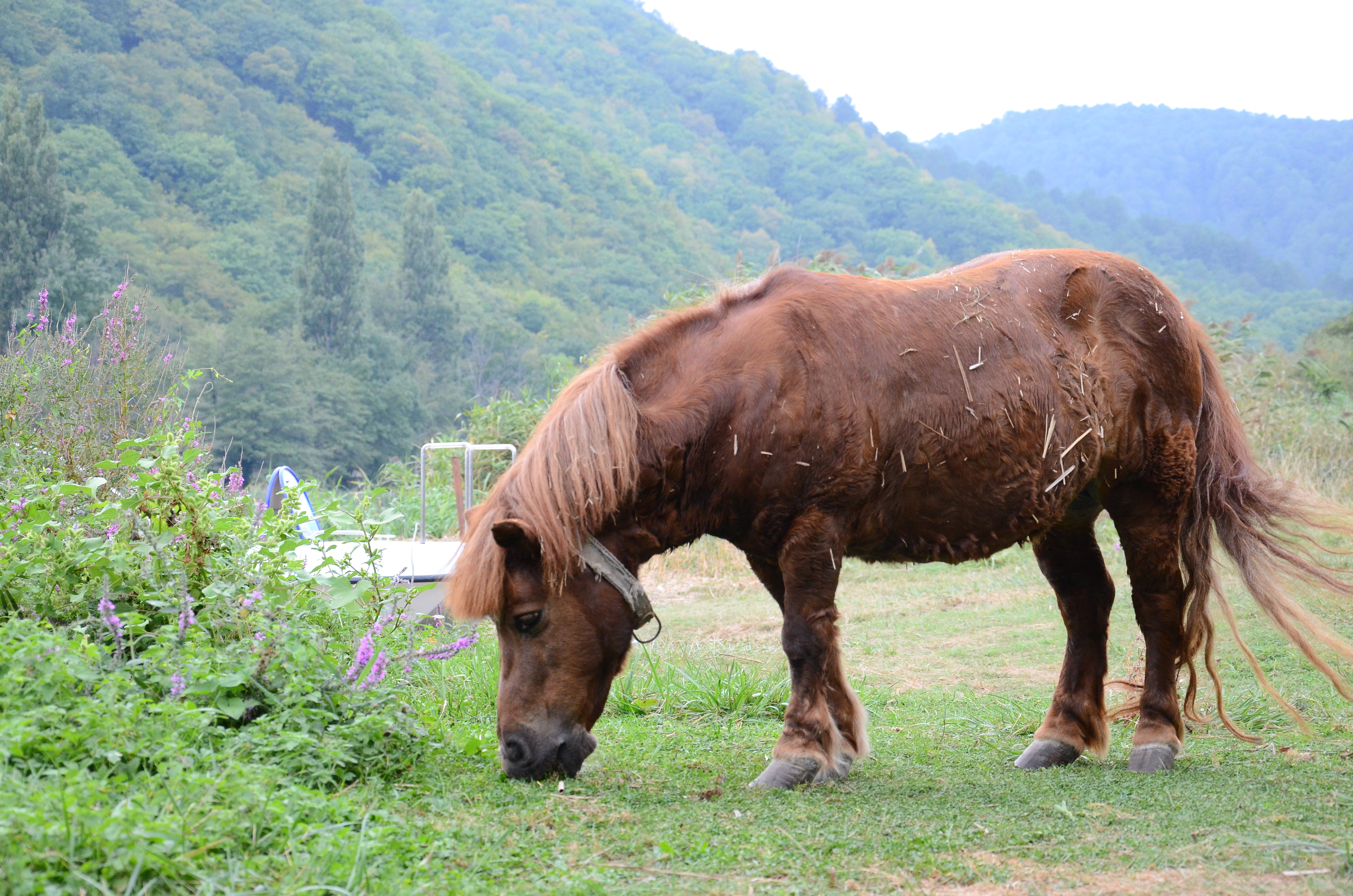
The front feet of this horse exhibit the rings and overgrowth typical of foundered horses.

Laminitis has various causes, some of which commonly occur together. These include:

=== Vasoactive amines ===
The inflammatory molecule histamine has also been hypothesized as a causative agent of laminitis. However, contradictory evidence indicates the role of histamine in laminitis has not been conclusively established.

=== Mechanical separation ===
Commonly known as road founder, mechanical separation occurs when horses with long toes are worked extensively on hard ground. The long toes and hard ground together contribute to delayed breakover, hence mechanical separation of the laminae at the toe. Historically, this was seen in carriage horses bred for heavy bodies and long, slim legs with relatively small hooves; their hooves were trimmed for long toes (to make them lift their feet higher, enhancing their stylish "action"), and they were worked at speed on hard roads. Road founder is also seen in overweight animals, particularly when hooves are allowed to grow long; classic examples are ponies on pasture board in spring, and pregnant mares.

=== Poor blood circulation ===
Normal blood circulation in the lower limbs of a horse depends in part on the horse moving about. Lack of sufficient movement, alone or in combination with other factors, can cause stagnant anoxia, which in turn can cause laminitis.

A horse favoring an injured leg will both severely limit its movement and place greater weight on the other legs. This sometimes leads to static laminitis, particularly if the animal is confined in a stall. A notable example is the 2006 Kentucky Derby winner Barbaro.

Transport laminitis sometimes occurs in horses confined in a trailer or other transportation for long periods of time. Historically, the most extreme instances were of horses shipped overseas on sailing ships. However, the continual shifting of weight required to balance in a moving vehicle may enhance blood circulation, so some horsemen recommend trailering as an initial step in rehabilitation of a horse after long confinement.

Laminitis has been observed following an equine standing in extreme conditions of cold, especially in deep snow. Laminitis has also followed prolonged heating such as may be experienced from prolonged contact with extremely hot soil or from incorrectly applied hot-shoeing.

=== Complex causes ===
- Pituitary pars intermedia dysfunction, or Cushing's disease, is common in older horses and ponies and causes an increased predisposition to laminitis.
- Equine metabolic syndrome is a subject of much new research and is increasingly believed to have a major role in laminitis. It involves many factors such as cortisol metabolism and insulin resistance. It has some similarities to type II diabetes in humans. In this syndrome, peripheral fat cells synthesise adipokines which are analogous to cortisol, resulting in Cushings-like symptoms.
- A retained placenta, if not passed completely after the birth of a foal, can cause mares to founder, whether through toxicity, bacterial fever, or both.
- Anecdotal reports of laminitis following the administration of drugs have been made, especially in the case of corticosteroids. The reaction may be an expression of idiosyncrasy in a particular patient, as many horses receive high dose glucocorticoid into their joints without showing any evidence of clinical laminitis.
- Even horses not considered to be susceptible to laminitis can become laminitic when exposed to certain agrichemicals. The most commonly experienced examples are certain herbicides and synthetic nitrate fertilizer.

== Risk factors ==
Whilst diet has long been known to be linked to laminitis, there is emerging evidence that breed and body condition also play a role. Levels of hormones, particularly adiponectin, and serum insulin are also implicated, opening up new possibilities for developing early prognostic tests and risk assessments.

== Diagnosis ==
Early diagnosis is essential to effective treatment. However, early outward signs may be fairly nonspecific. Careful physical examination typically is diagnostic, but radiographs are also very useful.

=== Clinical signs ===
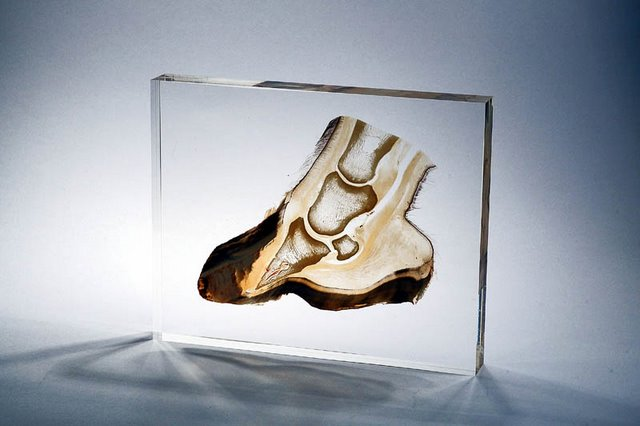
Cross-section of horse with severe laminitis, showing a dished dorsal hoof wall that grows in a more horizontal manner, and a sole that is convex due to pressure from the tip of P3 secondary to rotation. This specimen has undergone plastination to preserve its structure.

- Increased temperature of the wall, sole and/or coronary band of the foot
- A pounding pulse in the digital palmar artery
- Anxiety and visible trembling
- Increased vital signs and body temperature
- Sweating
- Flared nostrils
- Walking very tenderly, as if walking on egg shells
- Repeated "easing" of affected feet, i.e. constant shifting of weight
- Lameness with a positive response to hoof testers at the toe
- The horse stands in a "founder stance" in attempt to decrease the load on the affected feet. If it has laminitis in the front hooves, it will bring its hind legs underneath its body and put its fore legs out in front. In cases of sinking, the horse stands with all four feet close together, like a circus elephant.
- Tendency to lie down whenever possible, and recumbency in extreme cases
- Change in the outward appearance of the hoof in cases of chronic laminitis: dished (concave) dorsal hoof wall, "founder rings" (growth rings that are wider at the heel than the toe), a sole that is either flat or convex just dorsal to the apex of the frog which indicates P3 has displaced or penetrated, widening of the white line at the toe with or without bruising, "clubbing" of the foot.
- Change in the appearance of the coronary band: hair that does not lie in a normal position (not against the hoof wall), indentation or rim just above the hoof capsule allowing palpation behind the coronary band.
- In cases of sinking, it may be possible to palpate a groove between the coronary band and the skin of the pastern.

=== Lameness evaluation ===
==== Hoof testing ====
Laminitic horses are generally sore to pressure from hoof testers applied over the toe area. However, there is risk of a false negative if the horse naturally has a thick sole, or if the hoof capsule is about to slough.

==== Obel grading system ====
The severity of lameness is qualified using the Obel grading system:

- Obel grade 1: Horse shifts weight between affected feet or continuously lifts feet up. It is sound at the walk but displays a shortened stride at the trot.
- Obel grade 2: Horse displays a stilted, stiff gait, although is willing to walk. It is possible to easily lift a front foot and have the horse take all of its weight on the contralateral limb.
- Obel grade 3: Horse displays a stilted, stiff gait, but is reluctant to walk and is difficult when asked to lift a front foot.
- Obel grade 4: Horse is very reluctant to move, or is recumbent.

==== Nerve blocks ====
Horses suffering from the disease usually require an abaxial sesamoid block to desensitize the affected region, since the majority of pain comes from the hoof wall. However, chronic cases may respond to a palmar digital block since they usually have primarily sole pain. Severe cases may not respond fully to nerve blocks.

=== Radiographs ===
Radiographs are an important part of evaluating the laminitic horse. They not only allow the practitioner to determine the severity of the episode, which does not always correlate with degree of pain, but also to gauge improvement and response to treatment. Several measurements are made to predict severity. Additionally, radiographs also allow the visualization and evaluation of the hoof capsule, and can help detect the presence of a lamellar wedge or seromas. The lateral view provides the majority of the information regarding degree of rotation, sole depth, dorsal hoof wall thickness, and vertical deviation. A 65-degree dorsopalmar view is useful in the case of chronic laminitis to evaluate the rim of the coffin bone for pathology.

Radiographic measurements

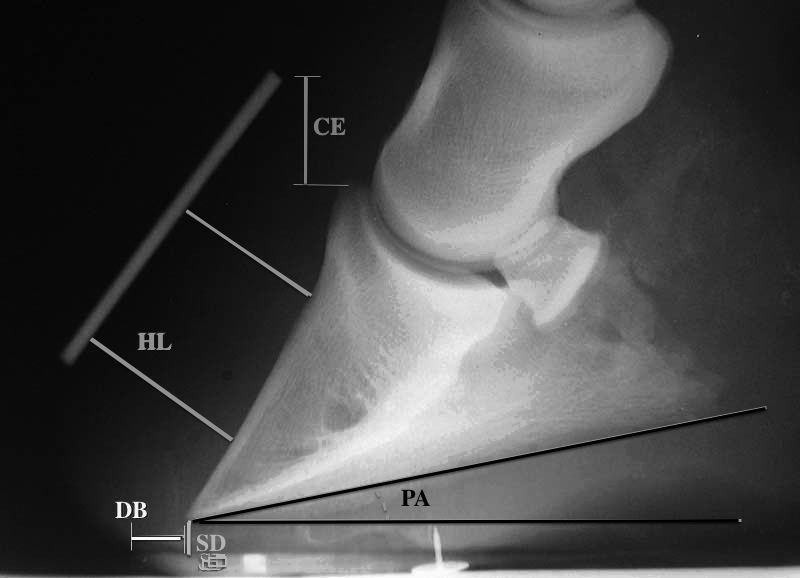
Radiographic measurements, including coronary extensor distance (CE), horn:lamellar distance (HL), sole depth (SD), digital breakover (DB), and palmar angle (PA)

Several radiographic measurements, made on the lateral view, allow for objective evaluation of the episode.

1. Coronary extensor distance (CE): the vertical distance from the level of the proximal coronary band to the extensor process of P3. It is often used to compare progression of the disease over time, rather than as a stand-alone value. A rapidly increasing CE value can indicate distal displacement (sinking) of the coffin bone, while a more gradual increase in CE can occur with foot collapse. Normal values range from 0–30 mm, with most horses >12–15 mm.
2. Sole depth (SD): the distance from the tip of P3 to the ground.
3. Digital breakover (DB): distance from the tip of P3 to the breakover of the hoof (dorsal toe).
4. Palmar angle (PA): the angle between a line perpendicular to the ground, and a line at the angle of the palmar surface of P3.
5. Horn:lamellar distance (HL): the measurement from the most superficial aspect of the dorsal hoof wall to the face of P3. 2 distances are compared: a proximal measurement made just distal to the extensor process of P3, and a distal measurement made toward the tip of P3. These two values should be similar. In cases of rotation, the distal measurement will be higher than the proximal. In cases of distal displacement, both values will increase, but may remain equal. Therefore, it is ideal to have baseline radiographs for horses, especially for those at high-risk for laminitis, to compare to should laminitis ever be suspected. Normal HL values vary by breed and age:

- Weanlings will have a greater proximal HL compared to distal HL
- Yearlings will have approximately equal proximal and distal HL
- Thoroughbreds are usually 17mm proximally, and 19mm distally
- Standardbreds have been shown to have a similar proximal and distal HL, around 16 mm at 2 years old, and 20 mm at 4 years old
- Warmbloods have similar proximal and distal values, up to 20 mm each
- HL tends to increase with age, up to 17 mm in most light breeds, or higher, especially in very old animals

Venograms

Venograms can help determine the prognosis for the animal, particularly in horses where the degree of pain does not match the radiographic changes. In venography, a contrast agent, visible on radiographs, is injected into the palmar digital vein to delineate the vasculature of the foot. The venogram can assess the severity and location of tissue compromise and monitor effectiveness of the current therapy. Compression of veins within the hoof will be seen as sections that do not contain contrast material. Poor or improper blood flow to different regions of the hoof help determine the severity of the laminitic episode. Venography is especially useful for early detection of support limb laminitis, as changes will be seen on venograph (and MRI) within 1–2 weeks, whereas clinical signs and radiographic changes do not manifest until 4–6 weeks.

Horses undergoing venography have plain radiographs taken beforehand to allow for comparison. The feet are blocked to allow the sedated horse to stand comfortably during the procedure. Prior to injection, a tourniquet is placed around the fetlock to help keep the contrast material within the foot during radiography. Diffusion of contrast may make some areas appear hypoperfused, falsely increasing the apparent severity of the laminitic episode. After injection of the contrast material, films are taken within 45 seconds to avoid artifact caused by diffusion. Evaluation of blood supply to several areas of the foot allows the practitioner to distinguish mild, moderate, and severe compromise of the hoof, chronic laminitis, and sinking.

=== Other diagnostics ===
Other imaging tools have been used to show mechanical deviations in laminitis cases include computed tomography, as well as MRI, which also provides some physiologic information. Nuclear scintigraphy may also be useful in certain situations. Ultrasonography has been explored as a way to quantify changes in bloodflow to the foot.

== Prognosis ==
The sooner the diagnosis is made, the faster the treatment and the recovery process can begin. Rapid diagnosis of laminitis is often difficult, since the general problem often starts somewhere else in the horse's body. With modern therapies, most laminitics will be able to bear a rider or completely recover, if treated quickly, and if the laminitis was not severe or complicated (e.g. by equine metabolic syndrome or Cushing's disease). Even in these cases, a clinical cure can often be achieved. Endotoxic laminitis (e.g. after foaling) tends to be more difficult to treat. Successful treatment requires a competent farrier and veterinarian, and success is not guaranteed. A horse can live with laminitis for many years, and although a single episode of laminitis predisposes to further episodes, with good management and prompt treatment it is by no means the catastrophe sometimes supposed: most horses suffering an acute episode without pedal bone displacement make a complete functional recovery. Some countermeasures can be adopted for pasture based animals. Discovery of laminitis, either active or relatively stabilized, on an equine prepurchase exam typically downgrades the horse's value, as the possibility of recurrence is a significant risk factor for the future performance of the horse.

Several radiographic abnormalities can be judged to correlate with a worsened prognosis:

- Increased degree of rotation of P3 relative to the dorsal hoof wall (rotation greater than 11.5 degrees has a poorer prognosis)
- Increased founder distance, the vertical distance from the coronary band (seen with a radio-opaque marker) to the dorsoproximal aspect of P3 (distance greater than 15.2mm has a poorer prognosis)
- Decreased sole depth
- Sole penetration by P3

== Treatment ==
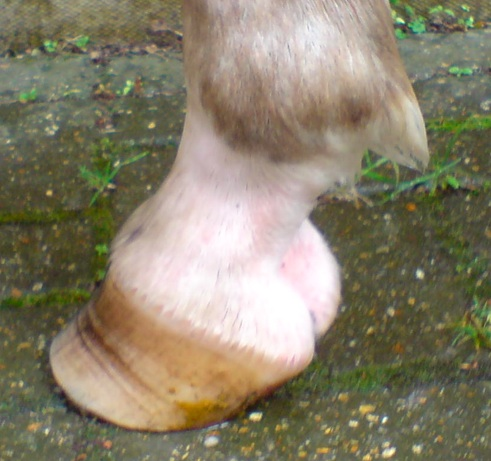
The isolated event line showing a period of diminished dorsal growth, followed by normalised growth, is indicative of a fairly recent and well recovered bout of laminitis in this foot.

In laminitis cases, a clear distinction must be made between the acute onset of a laminitis attack and a chronic situation. A chronic situation can be either stable or unstable. The difference between acute, chronic, stable, and unstable is of vital importance when choosing a treatment protocol. There is no cure for a laminitic episode and many go undetected. Initial treatment with cryotherapy and anti-inflammatory drugs may prevent mechanical breakdown if instituted immediately, but many cases are only detected after the initial microscopic damage has been done. In cases of sepsis or endotoxemia, the underlying cause should be addressed concurrently with laminitis treatment. There are various methods for treating laminitis, and opinions vary on which are most useful. Additionally, each horse and affected hoof should be evaluated individually to determine the best treatment plan, which may change with time. Ideally, affected hooves are re-evaluated on a regular basis once treatment commences to track progress.

=== Management ===
Initial management usually includes stall rest to minimize movement, and deeply bedding the stall with shavings, straw, or sand. Exercise is slowly increased once the horse has improved, ideally in an area with good (soft) footing, beginning with hand-walking, then turn-out, and finally riding under saddle. This process may take months to complete.

=== Cryotherapy ===
Cooling of the hoof in the developmental stages of laminitis has been shown to have a protective effect when horses are experimentally exposed to carbohydrate overload. Feet placed in ice slurries were less likely to experience laminitis than "uniced" feet. Cryotherapy reduces inflammatory events in the lamellae. Ideally, limbs should be placed in an ice bath up to the level of the knee or hock. Hooves need to be maintained at a temperature less than 10 degrees Celsius at the hoof wall, for 24–72 hours.

In the case of a full-blown case of laminitis, use of a cold water spa proved effective in the treatment of the thoroughbred racehorse Bal a Bali. For the first three days, Bal a Bali was kept in the spa for eight hours at a time. Once his condition stabilized, he continued to be put in the spa twice a day over the next few months. He eventually recovered enough to win two Grade 1 races before retiring to stud.

=== Drug therapies ===
==== Anti-inflammatories and analgesics ====
Anti-inflammatories are always used when treating acute case of laminitis, and include Nonsteroidal anti-inflammatory medications (NSAIDS), DMSO, pentoxpfylline, and cryotherapy. For analgesia, NSAIDs are often the first line of defense. Phenylbutazone is commonly used for its strong effect and relatively low cost. Flunixin (Banamine), ketoprofen, and others are also used. Nonspecific NSAIDs such as suxibuzone, or COX-2-specific drugs, such as firocoxib and diclofenac, may be somewhat safer than phenylbutazone in preventing NSAID toxicity such as right dorsal colitis, gastric ulcers, and kidney damage. However, firocoxib provides less pain relief than phenylbutazone or flunixin. Care must be taken that pain is not eliminated, since this will encourage the horse to stand and move around, which increases mechanical separation of the laminae.

Pentafusion, or the administration of ketamine, lidocaine, morphine, detomidine, and acepromazine at a constant rate of infusion, may be of particular benefit to horses suffering from laminitis. Epidurals may also be used in hind-limb laminitis.

==== Vasodilators ====
Vasodilators are often used with the goal of improving laminar blood flow. However, during the developmental phases of laminitis, vasodilation is contraindicated, either through hot water or vasodilatory drugs. Systemic acepromazine as a vasodilator with the fringe benefit of mild sedation which reduces the horse/pony's movements and thus reduces concussion on the hooves, may be beneficial after lamellar damage has occurred, although no effects on laminar blood flow with this medication have been shown. Nitroglycerine has also been applied topically in an attempt to increase blood flow, but this treatment does not appear to be an effective way to increase blood flow in the equine digit.

=== Trimming and shoeing ===
Besides pain management and control of any predisposing factors, mechanical stabilization is a primary treatment goal once the initial inflammatory and metabolic issues have resolved. No approach has been shown to be effective in all situations, and debate is ongoing about the merits and faults of the numerous techniques. Once the distal phalanx rotates, it is essential to derotate and re-establish its proper spatial orientation within the hoof capsule, to ensure the best long-term prospects for the horse. With correct trimming and, as necessary, the application of orthotics, one can effect this reorientation. However, this is not always completely effective.

==== Trimming ====
Successful treatment for any type of founder must necessarily involve stabilization of the bony column by some means. Correct trimming can help improve stabilization. This usually includes bringing the "break over" back to decrease the fulcrum-effect that stresses the laminae. Trimming the heels helps to ensure frog pressure and increases surface area for weight-bearing on the back half of the hoof. While horses may stabilize if left barefooted, some veterinarians believe the most successful methods of treating founder involve positive stabilisation of the distal phalanx, by mechanical means, e.g., shoes, pads, polymeric support, etc. Pour-in pads or putty is sometimes placed on the sole to increase surface area for weight-bearing, so that the sole in the area of the quarters, and the bars, will take some of the weight.

==== Altering the palmar angle ====
The deep digital flexor tendon places a constant pull on the back of the coffin bone. This is sometimes counteracted by decreasing the palmar angle of the hoof by raising the heels, often with the use of special shoes which have a wedge in the heel of approximately 20 degrees. Shoes are usually glued or cast onto the foot so painful nailing does not have to take place. The position of P3 within the hoof is monitored with radiographs. Once the horse has improved, the wedge of the shoe must be slowly reduced back to normal.

==== Use of orthotics ====
The application of external orthotic devices to the foot in a horse with undisplaced laminitis and once displacement has occurred is widespread. Most approaches attempt to shift weight away from the laminae and onto secondary weight-bearing structures, while sparing the sole.

==== Corrective hoof trimming ====
Corrective hoof trimming will restore proper hoof form and function. Corrective trimming will allow the hooves to be healthy again.

==== Realigning trimming ====
Realigning trimming trims back the toe so that it is in line with the coffin bone. Realigning trimming pushes the coffin bone back into the correct position. The process of a new hoof capsule totally growing out to replace the old one takes up to a year.

==== Alternative horseshoeing methods ====
New non-invasive horseshoeing methods are available for farriers to take advantage of. They encapsulate the damaged hoof, protecting and supporting the sensitive internal structures. This prevents further deterioration, whilst also immediately reducing pain and improving the horse's ability to move. The resulting comfort also reduces overall stress levels, leading to a faster recovery as the horse can quickly return to a regular routine.

=== Aggressive therapies ===
==== Dorsal hoof wall resection ====
A dorsal hoof wall resection may help in certain conditions after consultation with an experienced veterinarian and farrier team. If decreased bloodflow distal to the coronary plexus is seen on a venogram, or when a laminar wedge forms between P3 and the hoof wall, preventing the proper reattachment (interdigitation) of the laminae, this procedure may be beneficial. When the coffin bone is pulled away from the hoof wall, the remaining laminae will tear. This may lead to abscesses within the hoof capsule that can be severe and very painful, as well as a mass of disorganized tissue called a laminar (or lamellar) wedge.

==== Coronary grooving ====
Coronary grooving involves removing a groove of hoof wall just distal to the coronary band. It is thought to encourage dorsal hoof wall growth and improve alignment of the wall.

==== Deep digital flexor tenotomy ====
Because the rotation of P3 is exacerbated by continued pull on the deep digital flexor tendon, one approach to therapy has been to cut this tendon, either in the cannon region (mid-metacarpus) or in the pastern region. Over a time period of 6 weeks, tenotomy is thought to allow P3 to realign with the ground surface. Critics claim that this technique is unsuccessful and invasive, with advocates making counter-arguments that it is often used in cases which are too far advanced for treatment to help. Tenotomy does risk subluxation of the distal interphalangeal joint (coffin joint), which may be avoided with the use of heel extensions on the shoe. Horses may return to work after the surgery. This treatment is often recommended for severe cases of laminitis, and requires proper trimming and shoeing to be successful.

==== Botulinum toxin infusion ====
As an alternative to the deep digital flexor tenotomy, Clostridium botulinum type A toxin has been infused into the body of the deep digital flexor muscle. This theoretically allows for the same derotation as a tenotomy, but without the potential for scarring or contracture associated with that procedure. A recent study used this technique in seven laminitic horses. Significant improvement was seen in six of the horses, with moderate improvement in the seventh.

== Complications ==
Complications to laminitis include recurrent hoof abscesses, which are sometimes secondary to pedal osteitis, seromas, and fractures to the solar margin of the coffin bone.

== Informal use of the word "founder" ==
Informally, particularly in the United States, "founder" has come to mean any chronic changes in the structure of the foot that can be linked to laminitis. In some texts, the term is even used synonymously with laminitis, though such usage is technically incorrect. Put simply, not all horses that experience laminitis will founder, but all horses that founder will first experience laminitis.

== See also ==
- Barefoot horses
- Farrier
- Horse hoof
- Horseshoe
- Lameness (equine)
