= Flirtey =

American UAV manufacturer

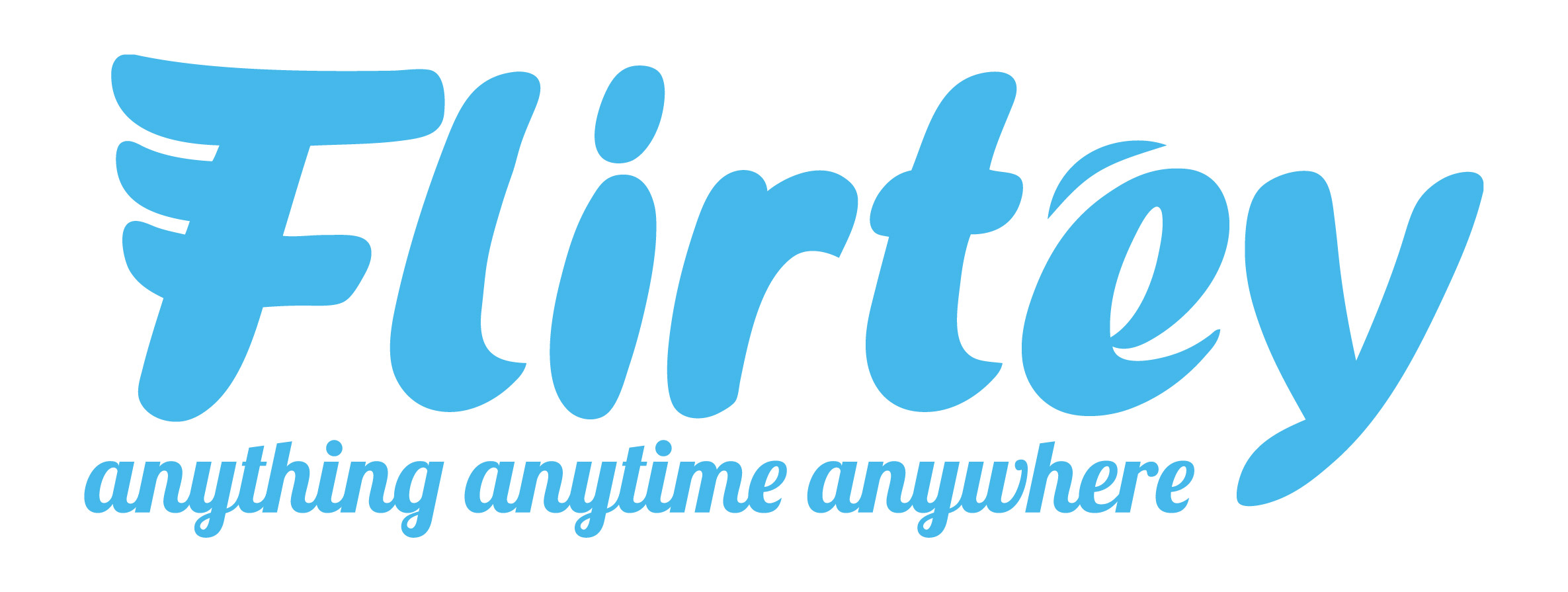
- Type: Private
- Industry: Transportation, Delivery
- Founded: 2013; 13 years ago in Australia
- Founders: Matt Sweeny (CEO), Ahmed Haider, Tom Bass
- Defunct: February 26, 2024
- Successor: SkyDrop
- Headquarters: Reno, Nevada
- Website: flirtey.com

Flirtey (later rebranded SkyDrop) was a Reno, Nevada-based drone delivery company. The company completed the first Federal Aviation Administration (FAA)-approved drone delivery in the United States in 2015, the first FAA-approved urban delivery in March 2016 and the first FAA-approved commercial drone delivery to a customer home in July 2016. Flirtey is also developing air traffic control computer software for drones in a collaboration with NASA. One of the company's drones is in the National Air and Space Museum of the Smithsonian Institution in Washington, D.C.

== History ==
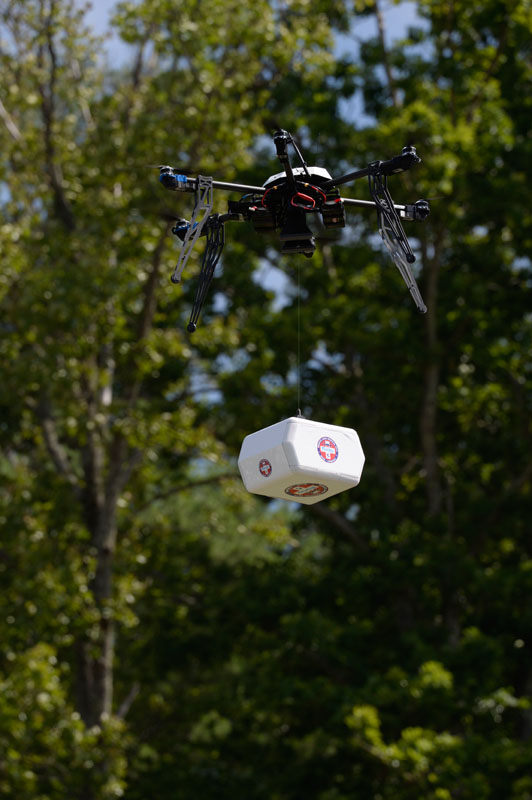
Flirtey drone used to make the first FAA-approved delivery in the U.S., which was later accepted into the Smithsonian's National Air and Space Museum

The company was founded in Australia in 2013 by Matt Sweeny, Ahmed Haider and Tom Bass. The company relocated to the Reno, Nevada area in 2014 after partnering with the University of Nevada, Reno. Flirtey completed the first FAA-approved drone delivery in July 2015, when it delivered medical supplies to a health clinic in Wise, Virginia. In August 2015, Flirtey graduated from the Silicon Valley seed accelerator, Y Combinator. In March 2016, the company flew the first federally sanctioned drone delivery in an urban area without the assistance of a human operator when it carried emergency supplies to a house in Hawthorne, Nevada.

Researchers from Johns Hopkins School of Medicine collaborated with Flirtey to complete the first ship to shore drone delivery in the United States in June 2016. The FAA-approved flight consisted of two parts. First, the drone delivering medical samples flew from land to a barge floating in New Jersey's Delaware Bay. Then, the drone was loaded with medical supplies and delivered its cargo to the Cape May–Lewes Ferry terminal. In July 2016, Flirtey partnered with 7-Eleven to complete its first fully autonomous FAA-approved home delivery to a residence in Reno, Nevada. This was the first time a U.S. customer has been delivered a package by a drone. In January 2017, Flirtey raised $16 million in Series A funding led by Menlo Ventures.

In May 2018, the FAA announced 10 drone programs, including Flirtey, for its Integration Pilot Program that expands permissions to included programs that would typically need specific FAA permits due to airspace regulations. Five of the 10 selected projects involve package delivery. Flirtey is working with four of the winning applicants selected by the program and will use drones as a first response to 911 calls in Reno, Nevada by delivering defibrillators in heart attack cases before an ambulance arrives to allow bystanders to deliver first aid. Flirtey was also included on CNBC's Disrupter 50 list in 2018.

In October 2021, the company announced a partnership with Mesa Air Group involving an order of four drones with an option for 50 more. Mesa plans to use Flirtey Eagle drones to begin conducting food and beverage deliveries.

On 26 February 2024, Sweeney announced on LinkedIn that the company was shutting down.
