= Equinalysis =

Computer software programme

Equinalysis is a computer software program designed to capture and analyse equine locomotion by visually tracking and quantifying biomechanical data. The system was developed in 2004 by consultant farrier, Haydn Price with the intent of allowing veterinarians, farriers, horse trainers and physiotherapists to highlight subtle changes in a horse's locomotion and provide a video record of how a horse's movements change during the course of its working life. This then allows the user to improve the horse's performance with various techniques and treatment plans, such as appropriate shoeing regimes.

== Operation ==
For the analysis, polystyrene markers are placed at specific points on the horse's limbs, mainly over the joints. Then the horse is walked and trotted in-hand, and filmed with a video camera from all angles on a hard, flat surface. The information is then collated and downloaded on to a CD or DVD, which is analyzed on a computer by an accredited individual. The specialist software program records the movement of the markers and produces data that can be used to quantify stride length, body symmetry, joint flexion and extension, and soundness. The resulting baseline of facts - which is presented in a hard-copy portfolio of information for future reference - then provides the horse owner with a valuable 'baseline measurement' of movement and soundness.

== Reliability ==
A 2011 study published in the Journal of Equine Veterinary Science found the system did not produce repeatable data from day to day, and was therefore not sufficiently reliable for use in clinical evaluations of equine lameness.

== See also ==
- Skeletal system of the horse
