= Matt Sweeny =

Australian American inventor, co-founder and CEO of Flirtey

Matthew Sweeny is an Australian-born aviation and technology entrepreneur and inventor. He is the co-founder and CEO of Flirtey, a drone delivery service.

== Education ==
Sweeny earned a bachelor's degree in international relations and philosophy from the University of Sydney.

He became interested in unmanned aerial vehicles while studying economics in Shanghai, China on a scholarship and exchange program. He built the prototype delivery drones in his dorm room.

== Career ==
After graduating, Sweeny co-founded Flirtey with Ahmed Haider and Tom Bass in 2013, as the first drone delivery service in the world. He moved to the United States in 2014 and based his company in Reno, Nevada, because the city was chosen by the Federal Aviation Administration as one of six test sites for commercial drones. He partnered with the University of Nevada, Reno, established a Flirtey office on campus, and hired graduates from the university’s Unmanned Autonomous Systems program.

In 2014, Sweeny submitted evidence to the Internal Market, Infrastructure and Employment Sub-Committee of the House of Lords European Union Committee On The Civilian Use of Drones in the EU.

After moving Flirtey to the United States, Sweeny was selected in Y Combinator’s summer 2015 program.

In 2018, Sweeny was included on CNBC’s Disruptor 50 list.

As of 2026, Sweeny is an inventor on 11 granted U.S. drone patents.
