= Justice Sweeney =

Justice Sweeney may refer to:

- A. William Sweeney (1920–2003), associate justice of the Ohio Supreme Court
- Francis E. Sweeney (1934–2011), associate justice of the Ohio Supreme Court
- James G. Sweeney (1877–1917), associate justice of the Supreme Court of Nevada
- John W. Sweeney (c. 1869–1964), associate justice of the Rhode Island Supreme Court
- Nigel Sweeney (born 1954), justice of the High Court of justice of England and Wales

== See also ==
- Judge Sweeney (disambiguation)
