= Equine prepurchase exam =

Exam of a horse prior to the purchase

In horse trading, an equine prepurchase exam is an examination of a horse requested by the buying party prior to the purchase, in order to identify any preexisting problems which may affect a horse's future performance and reduce buyer risk. The inspection usually consists of four phases in which a veterinarian examines all aspects of the horse's health.

== Role of the veterinarian ==
An equine prepurchase exam is carried out by a veterinarian, who must also have a knowledge of the particular horse's breed, prospective use and competition rules, to best assess a horse's current and future soundness. To determine the relative 'soundness' of the horse, veterinarians assess "the health status of the horse together with medical abnormalities", and should explain and record any medical abnormalities/concerns revealed during the exam. However, they are not guaranteeing the soundness of the horse. Veterinarians should be neutral to both buyer and seller to avoid any future discrepancies.

== Assessment of 'soundness' ==
Upon completion of the prepurchase exam, the veterinarian may use a variety of terms to describe the horse's current health status. Buyers are hoping for a horse classified as 'sound' - which "cannot be faulted in any physical way, from the inside out". A horse may be categorized as "serviceably sound" if it has some structural problems, but is able to perform its intended purpose. If a veterinarian deems a horse unfit for its intended use, the horse will most likely be considered "unsound", usually referring to any condition which will severely inhibit the horse from performing, such as dental diseases, blindness or other eye problems, founder and tumors.

== Phases of the exam ==
The first part of the exam involves thorough identification of the horse, including documentation of color, age and any distinguishing characteristics/scars/brands/tattoos the horse has. The horse's vital signs are also assessed, along with an examination of the horse's eyes, teeth and manure. A urine sample is usually required of competition horses to ensure the absence of performance-altering medications. According to the Merck Veterinary Manual, the date, time and place of the examination should also be recorded.

The second phase of the exam begins with a general assessment of the horse's body and skin condition. The veterinarian normally assigns the horse a body condition score from 1 to 9, with 1 being emaciated and 9 being obese. Scores of 4, 5, or 6 are within the acceptable range for performance, breeding and halter horses.

After a visual assessment of the horse, the veterinarian then begins palpation of the limbs. By watching the horse perform a variety of movements on different surfaces, the veterinarian is able to evaluate the horse's general soundness. Riding the horse is sometimes incorporated into the exam, depending on the intended use of the horse. The veterinarian can also ask the horse to move in straight lines and circles to reveal any blemishes. A passive/active flexion test is commonly performed along with a thorough hoof examination. A basic neurological exam may also be part of this third examination phase.

The fourth and final phase of the exam is known as the 'diagnostic' phase. Radiography, nuclear scans and ultrasonography may be necessary to determine soundness, with special emphasis placed on the examination of the navicular bone and distal phalanx. Higher radiographic grades of these areas are usually indicative of lameness and should be noted in a prepurchase exam.
