= Sweeny (horse lameness) =

Medical condition in horses

Sweeny or sweeney is a pathological condition of horses leading to fore limb lameness.

It is caused by paralysis of the suprascapular branch of the radial nerve.

The nerve paralysis leads to atrophy of the muscles of the shoulder (supraspinatus and infraspinatus).
