= Cavalry in the American Civil War =

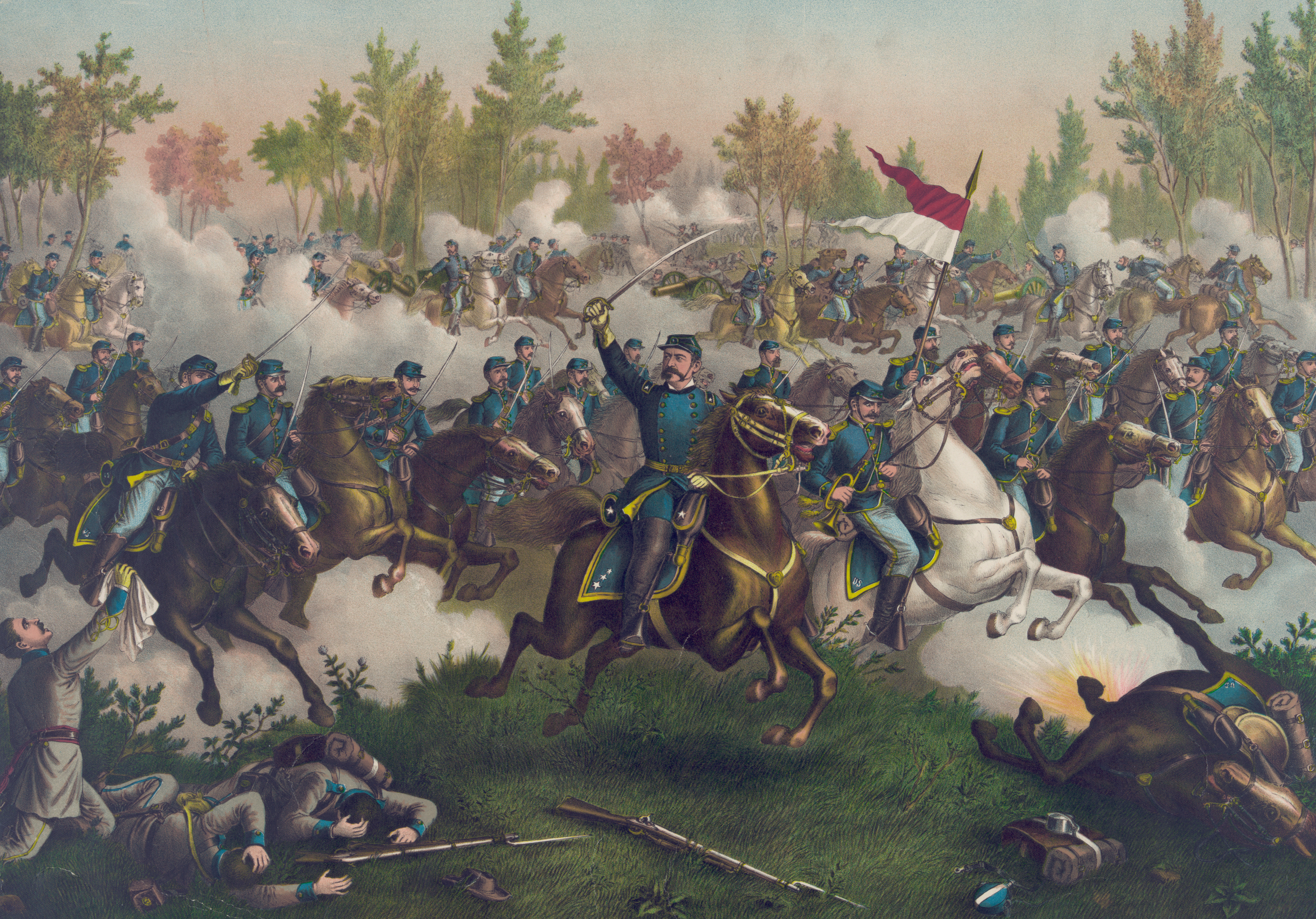
Union army cavalry at the Battle of Cedar Creek

The American Civil War saw extensive use of horse-mounted soldiers on both sides of the conflict. They were vital to both the Union army and Confederate States Army for conducting reconnaissance missions to locate the enemy and determine their strength and movement, and for screening friendly units from being discovered by the enemy's reconnaissance efforts. Other missions carried out by cavalry included raiding behind enemy lines, escorting senior officers, and carrying messages.

In the first half of the war, the Confederates enjoyed the advantage in cavalry, not least because most of the experienced cavalry officers from the Regular Army had chosen to side with the Confederacy. Notable Confederate cavalry leaders included J. E. B. Stuart, famed for literally riding rings around the Union's Army of the Potomac, and Nathan Bedford Forrest, who caused havoc with Union supply lines.

The Battle of Brandy Station in 1863 is considered the point by which Union cavalry proved itself equal to the Confederates, and onward through the second half of the war they continued to improve. This was exemplified by Benjamin Grierson's brilliant deception tactics in the Mississippi valley, and Philip Sheridan's aggressive movements while in command of the Army of the Shenandoah at the end of the war in Virginia.

Cavalry units proved highly expensive to maintain, and unscrupulous agents would often exploit shortages by supplying defective animals at exorbitant prices. The Union benefited from the creation of tighter regulations and a centralized acquisition and distribution system which ensured its forces remained mounted throughout the war. Conversely, the Confederacy's system of each soldier supplying their own horses resulted in the degradation of its cavalry units as horses became harder to obtain.

== Types of mounted forces ==
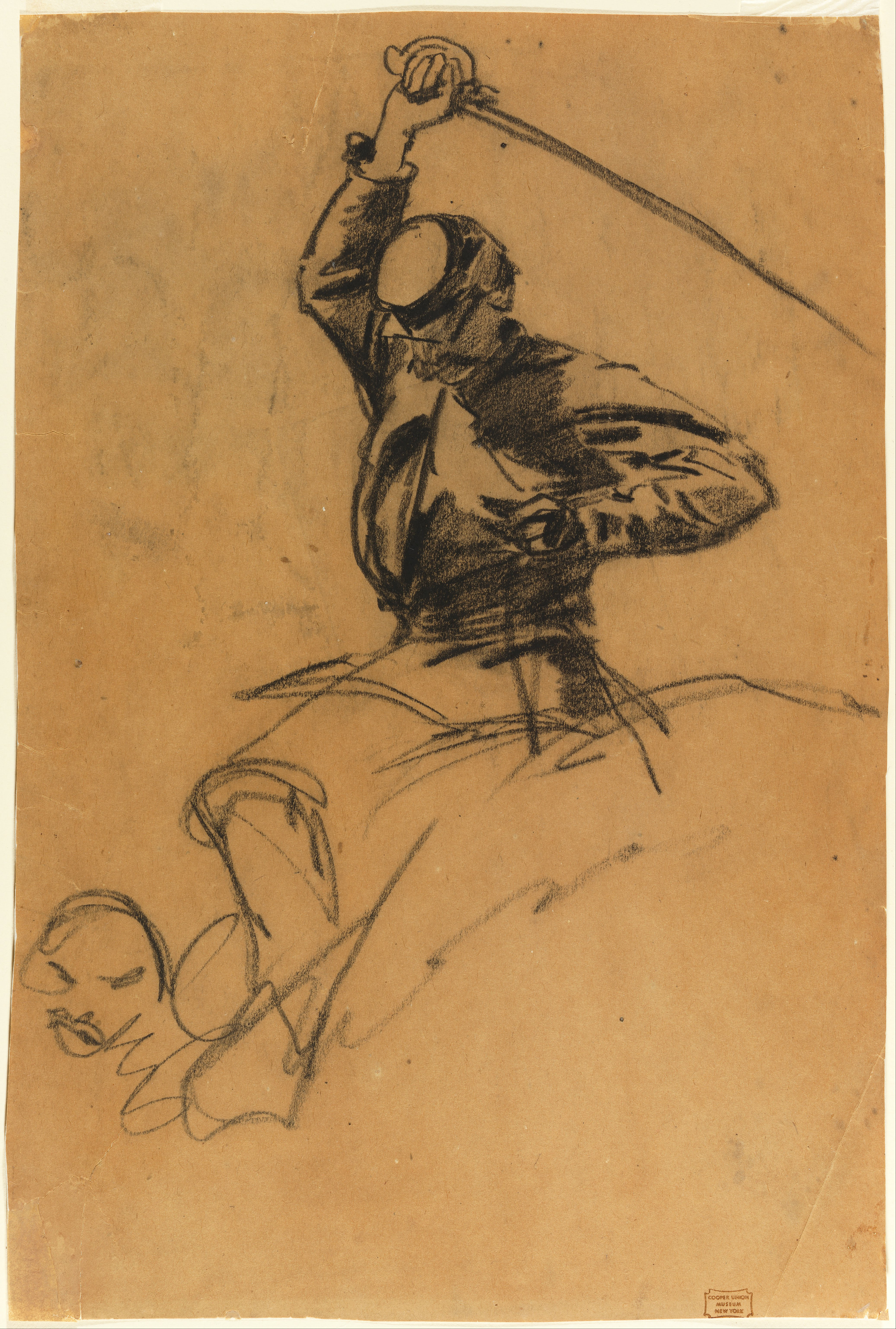
Cavalry Soldier with Sword on Horseback (Winslow Homer, 1863)

There were a variety of mounted forces prevalent in the Civil War, although for the sake of brevity they are often referred to under the catchall term "cavalry". Some units named themselves after European cavalry such as hussars and lancers, but these names were considered obsolete and used out of tradition rather than as an accurate description. Approximately 14 percent of the Union army consisted of cavalry, while in the Confederate States Army about twenty percent of soldiers were mounted.

- Cavalry were forces that fought principally on horseback, armed with pistols and sabers. Historically there had been two types of cavalry: heavy cavalry (such as carabiniers and cuirassiers), whose primary role was on the battlefield conducting a cavalry charge, and light cavalry (such as chasseurs à cheval and chevau-léger), which were more suited to screening, raiding, and reconnaissance. The United States did not have a strong cavalry tradition and Congress was unwilling to fund the creation of expensive heavy cavalry; only light cavalry were formed before and during the Civil War.
- Dragoons were hybrid forces that were armed with carbines, pistols, and sabers. They could fight from horseback as traditional cavalrymen but were expected to fight on foot as well. The term comes from the French Army, representing a cross between light infantry and light cavalry. Dragoons had been raised in the United States prior to the Civil War, and as the conflict progressed this method of fighting became more central to how cavalry fought overall.
- Mounted infantry were forces that moved on horseback but dismounted for fighting on foot, armed principally with rifles, pistols, and bayonets. Mounted riflemen had been raised previously by the United States to fight in the frequent conflicts with Native Americans. During the Civil War many foot infantry units were converted into mounted infantry. Although there was a belief that mounted infantry made for neither good cavalry nor infantry, with reliable weapons and competent leadership the concept would flourish, particularly in the Western Theater.
- Irregular cavalry (such as partisans and guerrillas) were generally mounted forces. A concept particularly employed by the Confederates, due in part to the Partisan Ranger Act, which was meant to aide the recruitment of irregulars into service with the Confederate Army. Many of the partisan cavalry units were considered excellent horsemen and operated both within and outside of Southern territory. There is little commonality as to their weapons in general, and any weapons available were used, but many favored the double-barreled shotgun.

== Roles ==
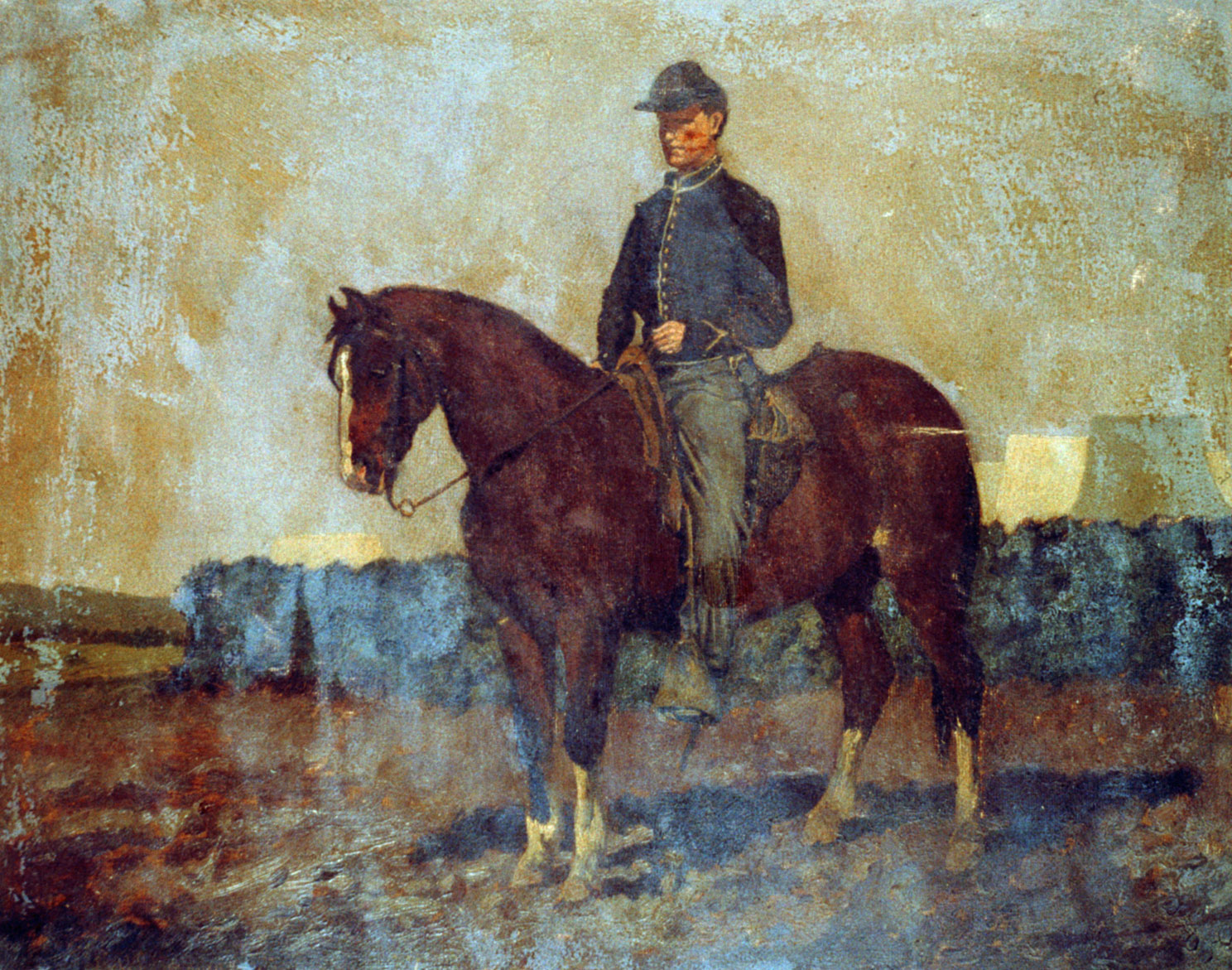
Cavalry orderly, Rappahannock Station, Va. (Edwin Forbes, 1864)

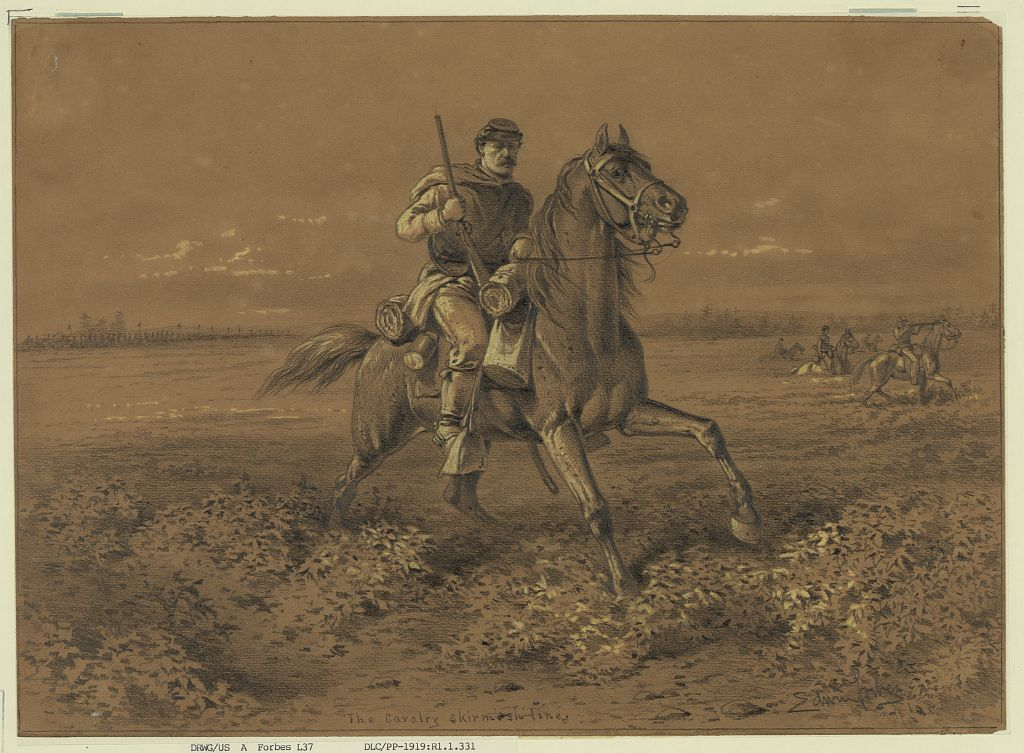
An advance of the cavalry skirmish line (Edwin Forbes, 1876).

At the time of the American Civil War, the cavalry had six major roles to play:

- Reconnaissance
- Screening
- Flank security
- Attacking the enemy
- Headquarters duties
- Raiding/Interdiction

Of these missions, reconnaissance was the most important role. Their inherent nature made cavalry ideally suited to be the "eyes and ears" of an army's commander and keep him informed of the enemy's position and movements. Cavalry had the agility and firepower to probe the enemy for weak points, set ambushes for isolated groups, and flee before the main force could overwhelm them. The widespread availability of field glasses only increased their information-gathering capabilities.

Reconnaissance and screening were crucial components in the Gettysburg campaign, where cavalry under Union General Alfred Pleasonton attempted to find the wide-ranging Army of Northern Virginia on its invasion of the North, and Confederate cavalry under J.E.B. Stuart effectively employed counter-reconnaissance to screen passes in the Blue Ridge Mountains and hide Robert E. Lee's movements from the Army of the Potomac. However, when Stuart was "cut loose" to conduct another raid around the Army of the Potomac, he deprived Lee of adequate reconnaissance at the beginning of the Battle of Gettysburg, one of the principal reasons for the Confederate defeat there.

The use and evolution of cavalry for offensive action in the Civil War is a subject of contention. The conventional view is that cavalry's traditional role on the battlefield - charging into enemy infantry with lances and sabers to break up their formations - had been appropriate in previous generations when the infantry's primary weapon was the smoothbore musket with an effective range of up to 100 yards (91 m). However, during the Civil War, the rifled musket was the primary infantry firearm, and against a weapon with an effective range of up to 500 yards (460 m) these mounted shock tactics were rendered ineffective and disastrous on the battlefield. Instead, cavalry had to learn to fight dismounted, in effect becoming mounted infantry who used their horses only for mobility and fought on foot as regular infantry. Furthermore, the terrain was also blamed for being less conducive to large cavalry maneuvers, particularly in the Eastern Theater which was broken up with an abundance of woodlands and farmlands.

Historian Earl J. Hess disputes the impact the rifle had on cavalry tactics in the Civil War, noting that even in the era of smoothbore muskets infantry had always been able to defend itself against cavalry attacks; a cavalry charge against infantry in formation and ready to meet it had almost always ended in failure. Paddy Griffith observed that the United States never had a strong tradition of heavy cavalry which normally conducted such attacks, whereas a cost-conscious Congress preferred to fund dragoons and mounted infantry which had more supposed versatility. Lacking a doctrinal basis for their use, Union cavalry only conducted a handful of cavalry charges against Confederate infantry in the first three years of the war and all were doomed to fail for reasons other than the rifle. Stephen Z. Starr found no proof that cavalry in the Civil War made a conscious choice to change their tactics in response to the rifle. While there was a shift towards more dragoon-based tactics overall, he cites a number of other factors for this evolution, principal among them being the quality of the mounts available and the lack of appropriate training for both horse and rider.

Long-distance raids were the most desirable mission for cavalrymen, primarily because of the fame that successful raids would bring, but they were often of little practical strategic value in comparison to the men and horses lost. Jeb Stuart became famous for two audacious raids around the Army of the Potomac in 1862; his third such attempt, during the Gettysburg Campaign, led to disaster for the Army of Northern Virginia. Inspired by the 'success' of these raids the Union attempted to mimic them but to mixed results. George Stoneman's raid in the Battle of Chancellorsville was considered a failure for although it destroyed considerable Confederate property, much of this was quickly repaired, at the cost of at least 1,000 of his horses ruined by the exertion. Meanwhile Benjamin Grierson's raid in the Vicksburg Campaign was a strategic masterpiece that diverted critical Confederate forces away from Ulysses S. Grant's army.

== Tactics ==
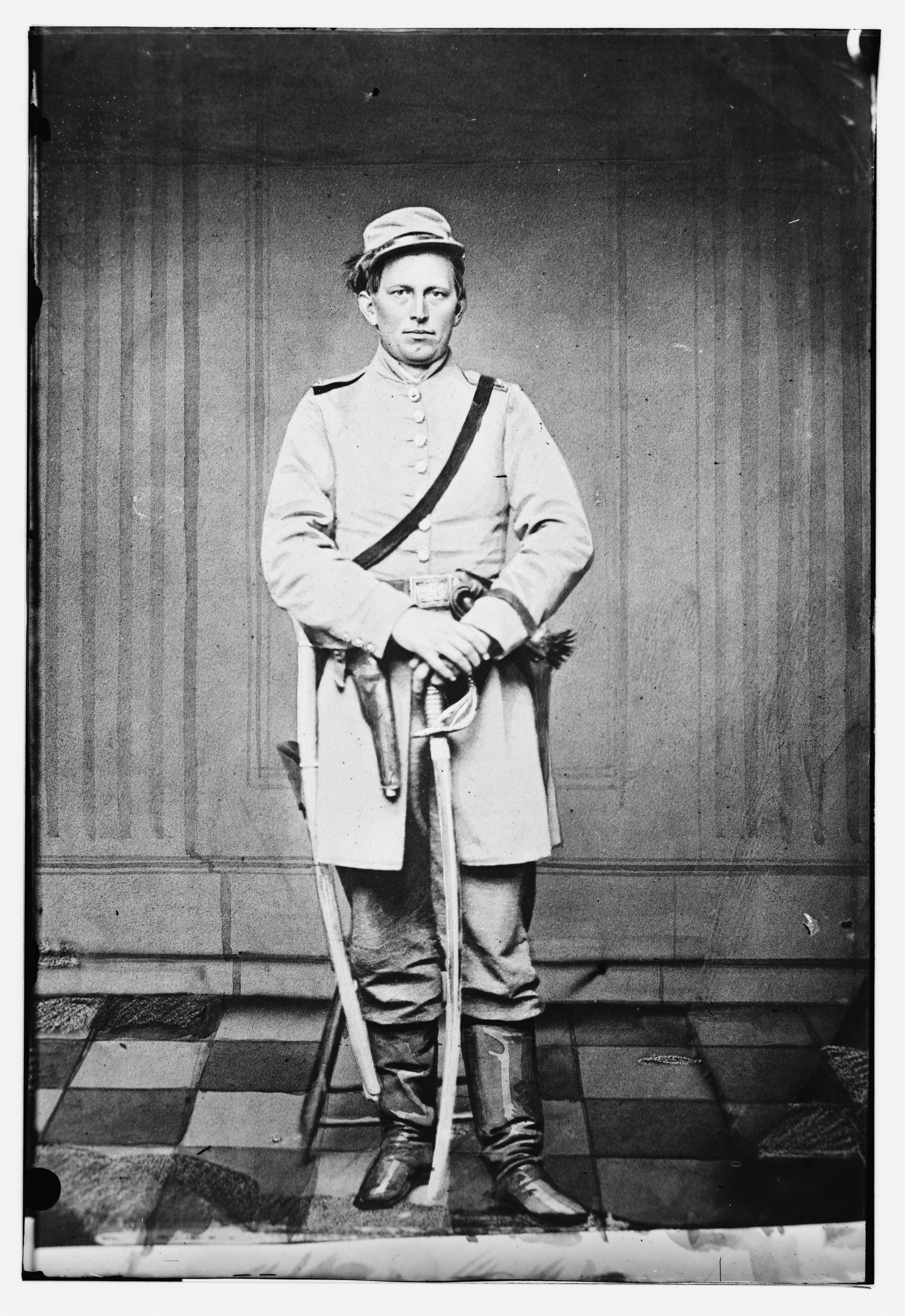
Capt. James S. West, C.S.A. (Cavalry)

Cavalry typically traveled in a column of fours, allowing for easy travel down roads and around obstacles. About 500 yards (460 m) to either side were parallel files of horsemen to protect the flanks. A vanguard and rearguard was also deployed out ahead and behind the column, which themselves deployed vedettes further ahead and behind to provide advanced warning. With a troop of 96 horsemen in a column of fours taking up 95 yards (87 m) of road, a cavalry force on the march could stretch for many miles: Sheridan's massive force of ten thousand troopers and six artillery batteries en route to Yellow Tavern measured thirteen miles long.

A cavalry force on picket duty would set up an outpost with about half of its total strength stationed there as a "grand guard." The rest would set up pickets out to the sides and in front of the outpost at a distance of 500 yards (460 m). Each picket would also deploy solitary vedettes in a semicircle a further 400 to 500 yards (370 to 460 m) out. Constant patrols were maintained between the outpost and the pickets, and additional patrols were set out ahead of the vendettes to distances of two or more miles. Picket duty was fatiguing for both soldiers and horses, and many cavalry leaders believed this type of work was better suited to infantry.

When setting up to conduct a charge, cavalry traditionally arrayed itself in a line of two ranks, although more recent doctrine called for just a single rank. It was also possible to make a charge from a column (or double column) of fours. Dismounted troopers formed themselves into a line of one rank, with skirmishers arrayed out in front of it. Every fourth trooper was a horseholder responsible for taking care of the others' mounts. They were positioned as near as possible to allow for a quick remount, while simultaneously taking advantage of any shelter available to stay out of danger.

By the latter part of the war, offensive tactics had settled around a hybrid that mixed the qualities of both traditional cavalry and mounted infantry. A cavalry unit would use their superior mobility to approach the enemy but then dismount a majority of their force to attack on foot. The dismounted troopers would use weight of fire to assault the enemy's position, particularly if armed with new repeating rifles. Finally at the right moment, the mounted portion stationed on one or both flanks would conduct a saber charge (or, if lacking in sabers, use their revolvers). When combined with the usage of horse artillery, cavalry fighting this way essentially became an "all-arms" force, though they were more expensive to maintain, required more logistical support, and could not field quite as many soldiers as comparable infantry forces.

== Organization ==
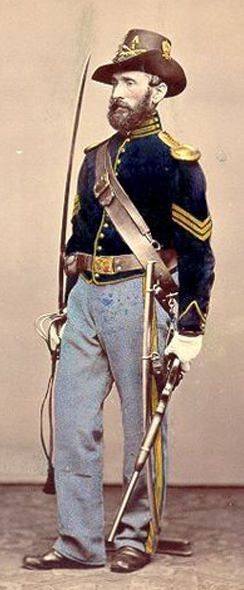
U.S. Army cavalry sergeant, 1866

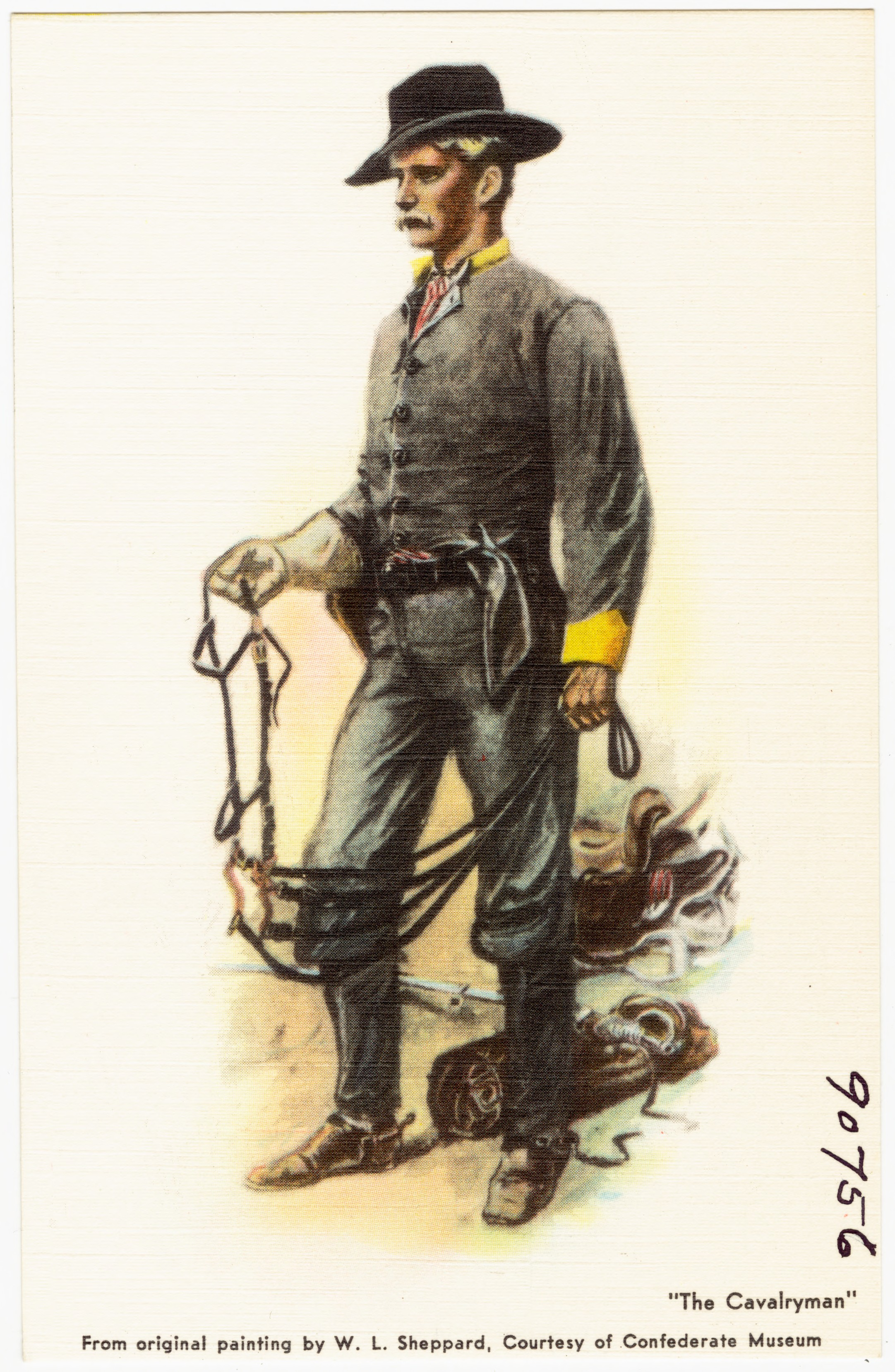
Confederate Cavalryman, by William L. Sheppard

The United States Army (known also as the Regular Army) before the Civil War utilized the regiment as the principal unit of maneuver and training for its cavalry forces. There were five regiments of mounted soldier: the 1st and 2nd Dragoon regiments, the Regiment of Mounted Riflemen, and the 1st and 2nd Cavalry regiments. They were similarly organized with ten companies (later renamed troops), each company commanded by a captain with a number of other commissioned and non-commissioned officers (NCOs) for around a hundred soldiers each. Two troops were further combined to form a squadron for five total. A regiment was commanded by a colonel (assisted by a lieutenant colonel and three majors) and included a staff which operated as part of the regimental headquarters.

When a sixth regiment (3rd Cavalry) was founded in May 1861, it instead constituted twelve troops for a total of 1,278 soldiers. This included a permanent battalion structure with two squadrons to a battalion and each battalion with its own commanding officer and staff. Regiments raised by the states under the United States Volunteers mirrored the organization of the 3rd Cavalry starting in July. In August, Congress renumbered the Regular Army's mounted forces as the 1st through 6th cavalry regiments. Then in July 1862 all cavalry regiments were reorganized around the twelve-troop model and the permanent battalion structure removed. Continued adjustments to the number of soldiers per regiment and troop made throughout the early part of the war were finalized in April 1863, when the authorized strength for a Union cavalry regiment was set at between 1,040 and 1,156. Although permanent battalions were removed, Union forces continued to operate in the field as squadrons and battalions. Independent battalions and companies of volunteers were also formed throughout the war.

The Confederates organized their cavalry regiments along the same principles as the old Regular Army regiments with ten companies. In November 1861, each company was to have at minimum sixty privates, later increased to eighty in October 1862, also commanded by a captain with a number of other officers and NCOs. Each regiment was commanded by a colonel, assisted by a lieutenant colonel and a major, with its own regimental staff. As with Union forces, the Confederates also formed independent battalions and companies of cavalry forces, and many partisan groups were formed which operated both within and outside of Confederate territory. Additionally, at least one cavalry legion was formed early in the war by combining infantry and artillery forces into one large regiment, but the concept was soon abandoned for being too unwieldy.

The actual size of cavalry regiments rarely if ever conformed to their paper strength. Sometimes they could be much larger: Turner Ashby for example grew his 7th Virginia Cavalry Regiment to over 1,400 troopers by April 1862 (split between twenty-two and twenty-six companies) by refusing to allow its division into multiple regiments. More often, regiments were worn down by attrition until they were a fraction of their authorized size: Union regiments averaged between 400 and 600 total, while Confederate regiments averaged between 160 and 360 total. In one extreme example, an unnamed Union regiment at the Battle of Five Forks numbered only 45 men. The fate of most regiments once they were reduced to a certain size was either disbandment or consolidation with other units, much to the chagrin of the veteran troopers. The states were mostly responsible for recruitment and many governors were more inclined to create brand new units as a form of political patronage rather than return an existing unit to full strength. Nevertheless, the Confederates did a better job than the Union at funneling replacements to existing regiments.

Confederate Army
Unit	Number
Regiments	137
Legions	1
Battalions (separate)	143
Companies (separate)	101

Union army
Unit	Number
Regiments (Regular Army)	6
Regiments (Volunteer Army)	266
Battalions (separate)	45
Companies (separate)	78

Above the regiment was a brigade which consisted of several regiments, and several brigades were combined into a division. Brigades and divisions were commanded by brigadier generals and major generals respectively, although for lack of a higher rank some Union cavalry brigades and divisions were commanded by colonels and brigadier generals instead. Both sides also eventually combined their cavalry forces into corps, grouping a number of divisions together. Union brigades were numbered based on their position within their parent division, as were divisions within their corps, however Confederate units were known by their commanding officer's name.

Confederate Army
Unit type	Low	High	Average	Most frequent
Divisions per corps	2	3	2.43	2
Brigades per division	2	7	2.81	2
Regiments per brigade	2	8	4.21	4

Union army
Unit type	Low	High	Average	Most frequent
Divisions per corps	2	6	2.92	3
Brigades per division	2	6	2.55	2
Regiments per brigade	2	8	3.90	4

Starting at the regimental level, commanders had a staff of officers to help with the administration of their unit. Regimental staff officers were chosen from among the unit's lieutenants, while higher formations were to have a representative from the armies' respective war departments. General officers were also allowed a personal staff of aides-de-camp and a chief of staff. Neither side had an effective way to train staff officers however, and so their competence tended to be based on how much experience they gained. Furthermore, with some exceptions there were no enlisted personnel authorized to assist in carrying out the logistical work necessary to keep these units supplied. Either civilian workers had to be hired or soldiers detailed to handle these functions; the former tended to be unreliable while the latter lessened the combat effectiveness of their units.

In both armies, the cavalry was accompanied by batteries or battalions of horse artillery where possible. They also had their own train of supply wagons and traveling forges. The size of the train could be quite large to support a cavalry force: even a single regiment might demand 81 wagons to keep it supplied. Forage in particular was the bulkiest and most difficult to transport of all military supplies. In October 1862 the Army of the Potomac, with 127,818 soldiers and 321 cannons, had a daily supply requirement of 667.5 short tons (605.5 t; 596.0 long tons), of which 411.9 short tons (373.7 t; 367.8 long tons) was forage for its 22,493 horses and 10,392 mules.

== Equipment ==
=== Horses ===
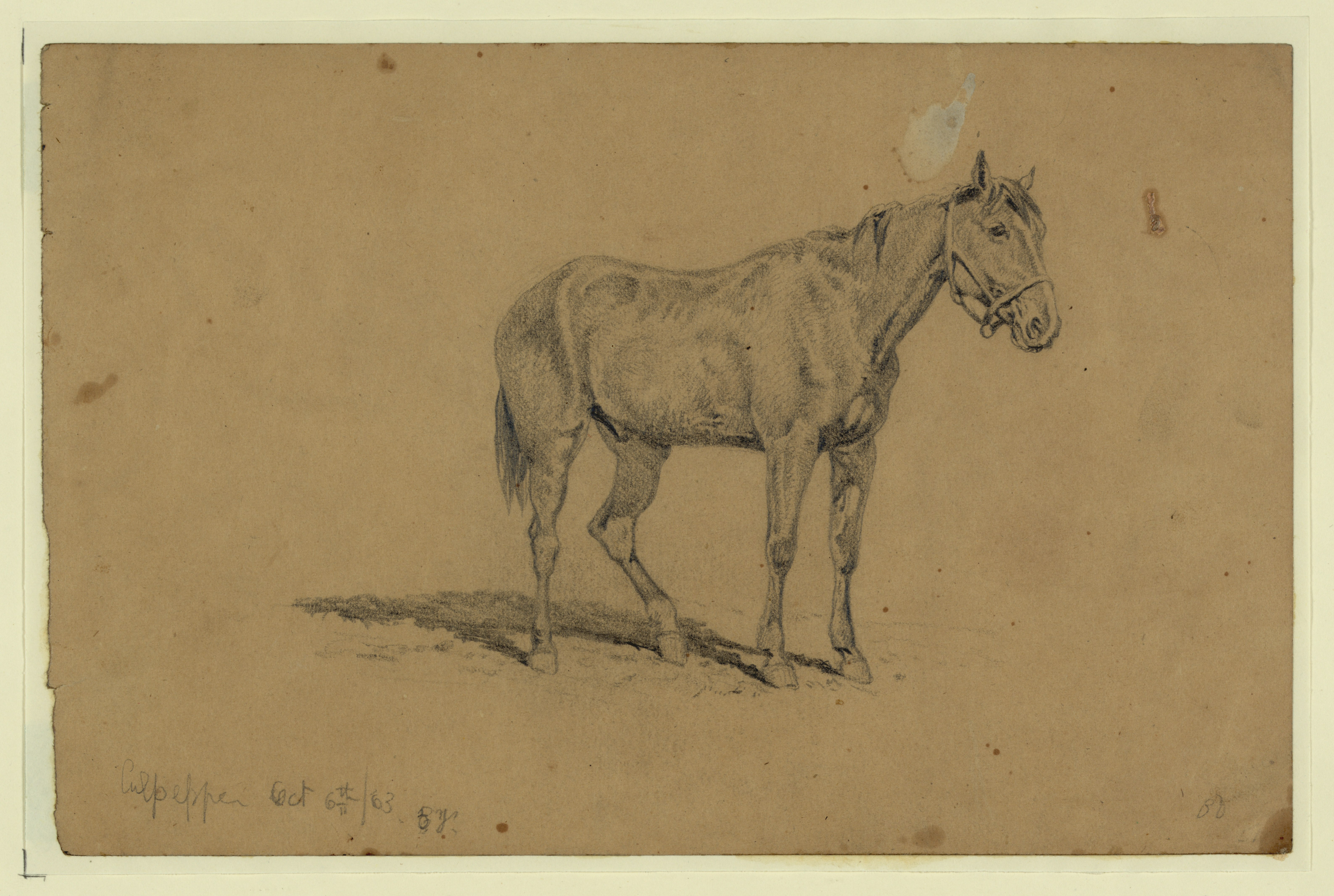
Cavalry Horse (Edwin Forbes, 1863)

The principal item of equipment for a cavalryman was the horse and one of the reasons both North and South initially hesitated in forming mounted units was because of financial considerations; each cavalry regiment cost $300,000 for initial organization with annual upkeep expenses tallying over $100,000. Both cavalries originally required recruits or local communities to provide horses, a policy that lasted briefly in the North, while the South maintained it throughout the war even though Richmond leaders recognized its serious drawbacks. While Confederate troopers bore the monetary cost of keeping themselves mounted, Union cavalrymen rode quartermaster-issued animals obtained through public contracts (although officers had to reimburse the cost of their mounts to the government). While open to fraud early in the war, once tightened regulations and stringent inspections were enforced, the contract system yielded an estimated 650,000 horses for Union armies during the war exclusive of an additional 75,000 confiscated in Confederate territory.

Union army guidelines for cavalry horse selection mandated animals be at least 15 hands (60 inches (150 cm)) high, weighing on average around 950 pounds (430 kg), and aged between 4 and 10 years old, and be well-broken to bridle and saddle. Animals were to be dark colors and free from defects such as shallow breathing, deformed hooves, bone and bog spavin, or ringbone. Geldings were preferred for cavalry horses with the purchase of mares strictly prohibited outside absolute military emergency, while stallions' volatility and aggressiveness made them generally unsuitable for service. In the Confederacy, limited horse numbers did not permit such selectivity in trying to keep their armies horsed.

Cavalry horse prices varied throughout the war; in 1861 the maximum government price for cavalry horses was $119. However, relentless military demand caused prices to continually increase and by 1865 prices hovered near $190 per head. In the Confederacy horse prices rapidly spiraled upward due to animal scarcity and inflation costing over $3,000 by war's end. The daily feed ration for Union cavalry horses was ten pounds of hay and fourteen pounds of grain which were ample and fulfilled the animals' nutritional needs if of good quality, however, the vagaries of the army supply system did not always insure prescribed forage amounts were delivered where most needed.

On both sides volunteer officers often proved notably lax in promoting strict animal welfare, a shortcoming exacerbated by the absence of a trained and organized veterinary corps which allowed serious maladies like strangles, grease heel, and glanders to spread among army stock. The U.S. Congress finally created the rank of veterinary sergeant in March 1863, but the meager pay and rank held no inducement for qualified candidates to join the army. Repeated calls to establish a professional military veterinary service failed, and widespread waste, suffering, and destruction among army horses resulted; not until 1916 was an official U.S. army veterinary corps founded.

Horses gave the cavalry forces significant mobility: during an eight-hour day a distance of 35 miles (56 km) could be covered without fatiguing horse or rider. In some operations, forces were pushed to the limit: Jeb Stuart's raid on Chambersburg, Pennsylvania, in 1862, saw his troopers march 80 miles (130 km) in 27 hours, while during Morgan's Raid his forces averaged twenty-one hours in the saddle on some days (and once covered 90 miles (140 km) in thirty-five hours). Such excesses were extremely damaging to the readiness of the units and extensive recovery periods were required. Stuart, during the Gettysburg Campaign, resorted to procuring replacement horses from local farmers and townspeople during his grueling trek northward around the Union army. In York County, Pennsylvania, following the Battle of Hanover, his men appropriated well over 1,000 horses from the region. Many of these untrained new mounts proved a hindrance during the subsequent fighting at East Cavalry Field during the battle of Gettysburg.

Commanders often tried to procure specific breeds for their men, with the Morgan being a particular favorite within the Army of the Potomac. Famous Morgan cavalry mounts from the Civil War included Sheridan's "Rienzi" and Stonewall Jackson's "Little Sorrel".

=== Weaponry ===
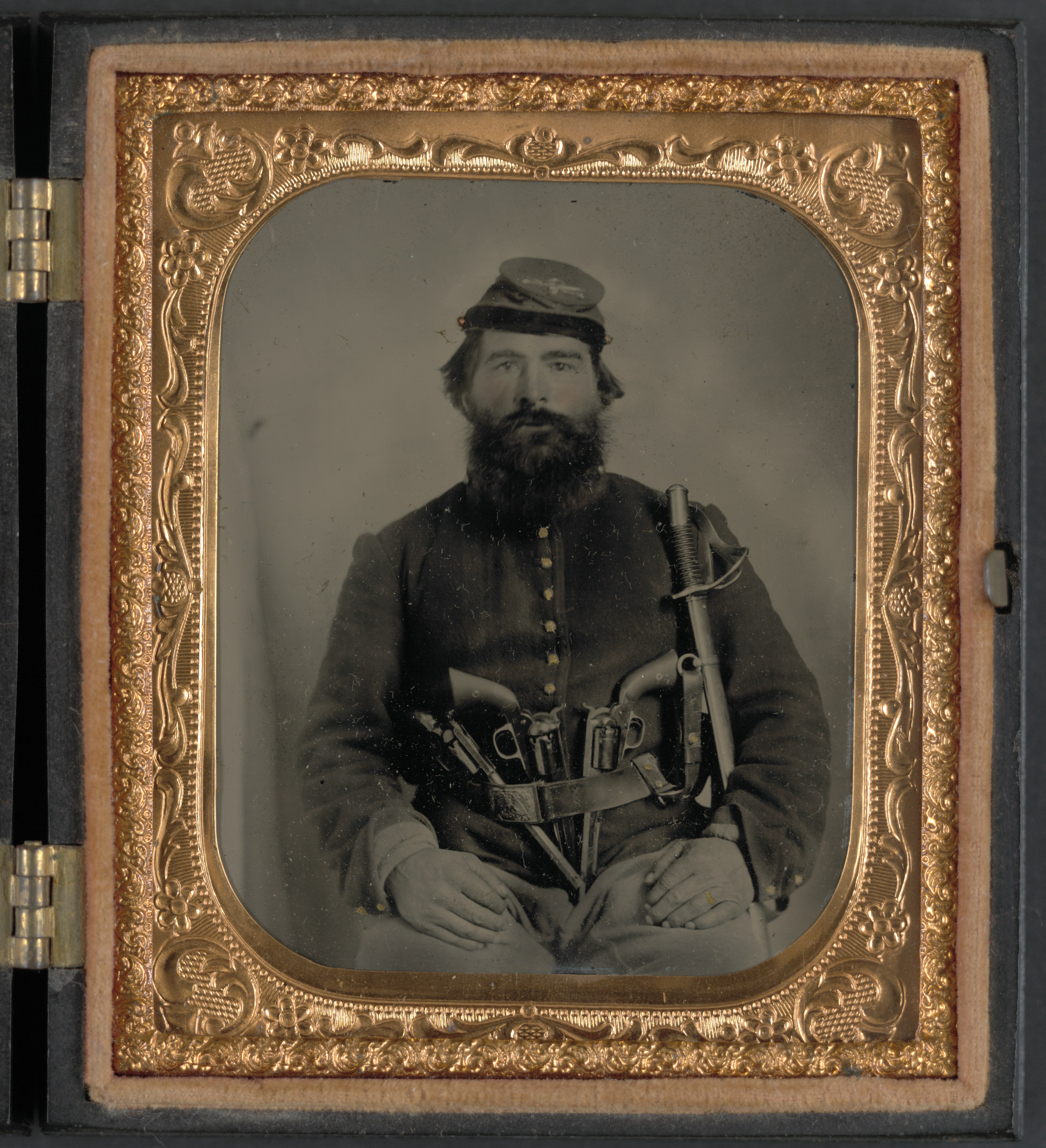
Union cavalryman A.J. Blue armed with three pistols and a sword.

A wide variety of weaponry was carried by mounted forces during the Civil War. While it is commonly held that Northern cavalry were better equipped than their Southern counterparts, this was not always the case, particularly at the beginning of the war. By the start of 1862, most had been issued a saber and pistols, but many regiments had no more than ten to twelve carbines per company. In these cases, instead of spreading out their firepower, some regiments organized their troopers by weaponry: the 2nd Michigan formed two "dragoon battalions" (armed with carbines) and one "saber battalion."

It was not until 1863 when every Union trooper was guaranteed a carbine in addition to his revolvers and saber. However, up through to the end of the war many regiments were armed with multiple models of carbines, making resupply difficult. Confederate soldiers meanwhile might carry anything from the latest carbines imported from Europe to flintlock muskets and Bowie knives, although the primary source for their weapons was whatever could be captured from defeated Union forces.

- Rifles were the standard weapon of infantry during the Civil War but were also carried by some mounted forces. Many used traditional infantry rifle muskets while others employed new repeating rifles. In perhaps the most famous example of the latter, Colonel John T. Wilder equipped the entire "Lightning Brigade" with brand-new Spencer repeating rifles out of his own pocket (intending to deduct the cost from his men's wages, an embarrassed Federal government agreed to reimburse him instead). Rifles were considered too unwieldy to be used from horseback though.
- Carbines were shorter in overall length, less cumbersome to carry mounted or dismounted, and easier to operate from horseback. However, their accuracy was greatly diminished compared to that of other long guns. Most carbines were .52- or .56-caliber, single-shot breech-loading weapons. They were manufactured by several different companies, but the most common were the Sharps rifle, the Burnside carbine, and the Smith carbine. Late in 1863, the seven-shot Spencer repeating carbine was introduced, but it was rarely deployed. When James H. Wilson was made chief of the Cavalry Bureau in January 1864, he adopted the Spencer as the standard Union cavalry firearm; while many regiments were fully rearmed with these repeaters, some were still armed with other weapons by the war's end. Confederate forces could use captured breechloaders like the Sharps and produce copies of these since their linen cartridges were duplicable. The metallic cartridges needed by other carbines like the Burnside and Spencer were too advanced for the Confederates to copy and so were not used for lack of ammunition.
- Handguns, carried by both Northern and Southern cavalry, were usually six-shot revolvers, in .36- or .44-caliber, from Colt or Remington. They were useful only in close fighting since they had little accuracy. It was common for cavalrymen to carry two revolvers for extra firepower, and John S. Mosby's Rangers often carried four each: a pair in their holsters and another pair in their saddlebag.

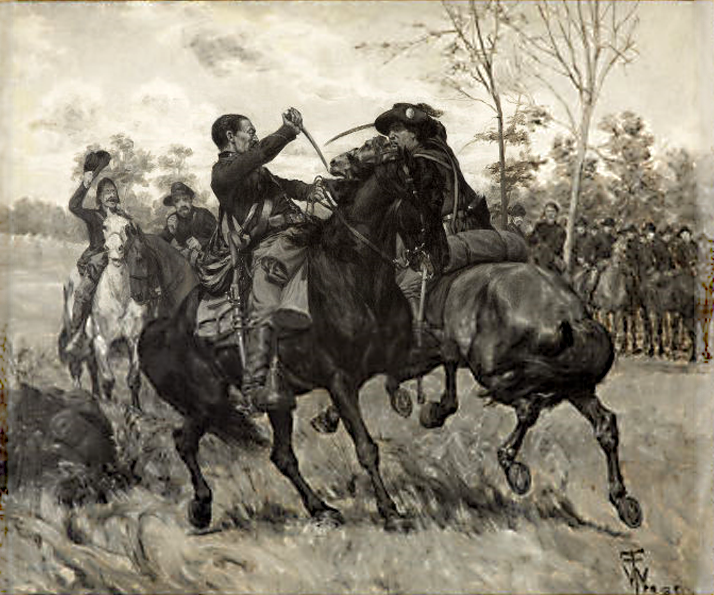
Saber duel between Union and Confederate cavalrymen (William B. T. Trego, 1887)

- Sabers were used by cavalrymen on both sides, the most common models being the Model 1860 Light Cavalry Saber and Model 1840 Cavalry Saber, although their utility was questioned even at the time. On average Northern troopers made greater use of sabers while Southern troopers preferred other weapons. John Mosby noted that the only instances he used a saber was as a spit and discarded it as soon as he could. In some units like the 2nd Kentucky regiment, if any man attempted to carry a saber he would be considered a "laughing stock" by the rest. Conversely, Confederate cavalry commanded by General Wade Hampton III were said to like nothing so well as a chance to use their sabers in combat. In an October 1864 report, Jubal Early complained that Confederate cavalry armed only with rifles were at a severe disadvantage in open country against Union cavalry who could fight on horseback with sabers.
- Shotguns were used during the early phases of the war, particularly by the Confederacy, as troopers brought with them whatever weapons they had on hand. Though capable of inflicting heavy damage at close range, they were mostly replaced once both sides got sufficient supplies of carbines. Partisan cavalry preferred to use double-barreled shotguns though, especially units operating in the Western Theater. A common tactic was to charge the enemy and unleash both barrels at close range then switch to a pistol or use the buttstock as a club.
- Lances were used alongside sabers by a select few cavalry regiments, such as the 5th Texas Cavalry and the 6th Pennsylvania Cavalry. Lances had been used since medieval times, but had been rendered obsolete since the invention of the Minié ball (hollow-base bullet) for rifled muskets. During the Battle of Valverde, the 5th Texas Cavalry performed the only major lancer charge of the war, and was slaughtered, abandoning the lance after the battle. The 6th Pennsylvania Cavalry discontinued usage of the lance in May 1863 and where replaced with carbines.

== Confederate cavalry ==
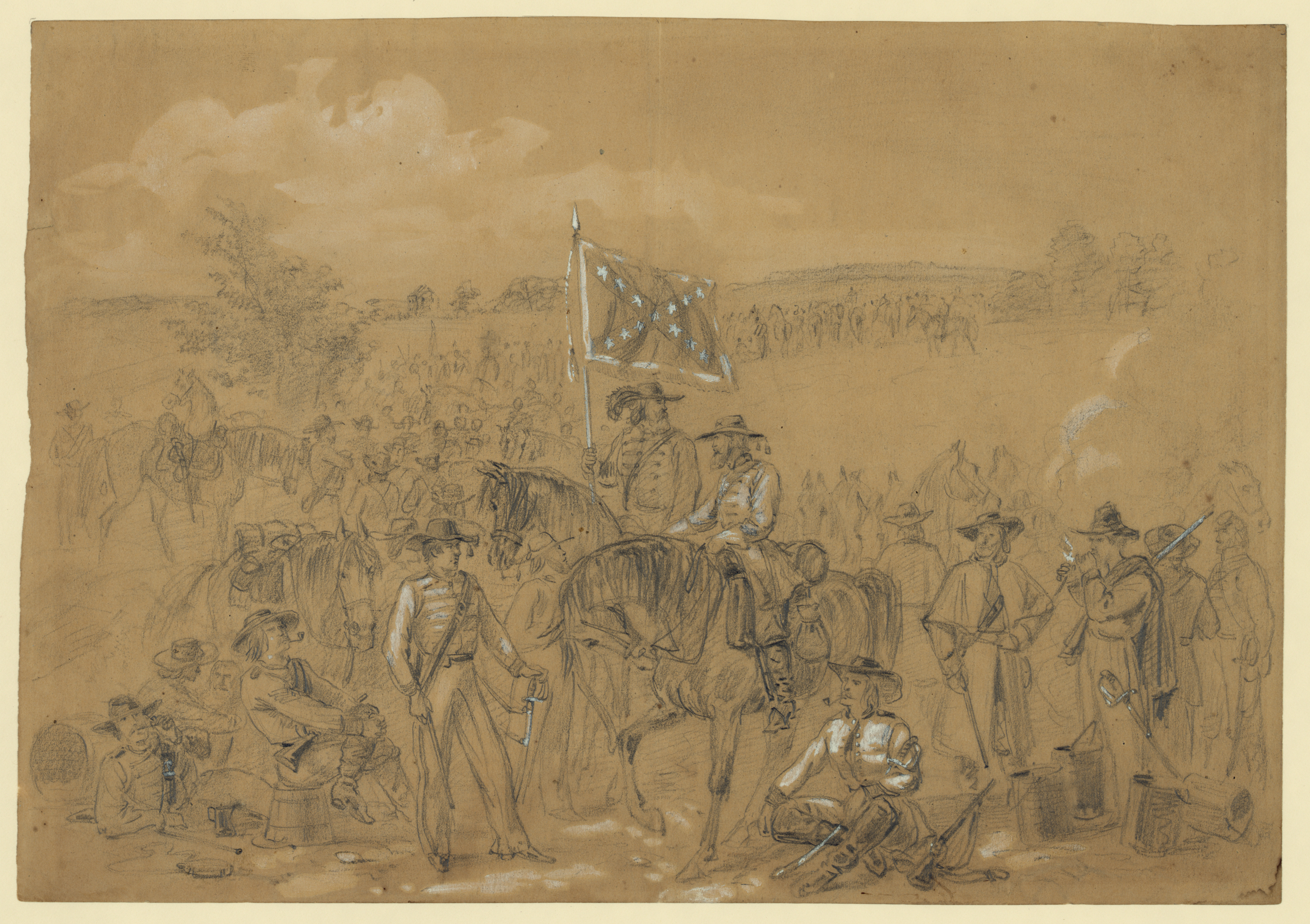
Sketch of 1st Virginia Cavalry

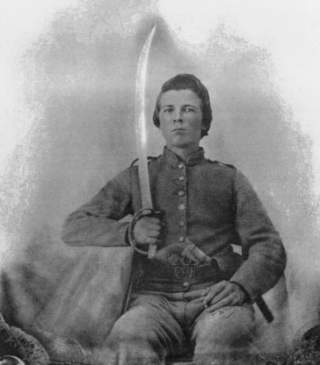
Sgt. John Richard Whitehead, Company G, 6th Battalion, Virginia Cavalry, Pittsylvania County, Virginia

A Southerner was, on average, considered a superior horseman to his Northerner counterpart, especially early in the war. The common explanations for this stereotype were the poor road conditions in the rural South, requiring a greater reliance on horses for individual transportation, combined with a pervasive cavalier culture within the Southern aristocracy which emphasized equestrianism. Historian Gregory J. W. Urwin has referred to such a broad generalization as a part of a "tired, overly-familiar myth" which explains away the South's defeat due to the North's industrial might. Paddy Griffith also argues that, with each trooper having to supply their own horse, "[o]ne does not need to invoke any theory of 'Southern Cavaliers' or 'innate equestrian skills' to see that a soldier will do better if he rides his own cherished four-legged friend than if he is astride an anonymous item of government property."

Furthermore, both Urwin and Griffith note that these same factors – the use of their own horses and the aristocratic culture – made Southern troopers notoriously insubordinate: soldiers often refused to follow orders or went home whenever they felt like, and some officers refused to serve under commanders with whom they had petty grievances. In one remarkable case a Tennessee cavalry regiment unilaterally decided to disband itself. Governor Zebulon Vance of North Carolina went so far as to compare Confederate cavalry operating within his state to the Plagues of Egypt.

With Confederate cavalry responsible for their own horses, many first rode into battle on some of the finest mounts available, but as the war progressed it became harder and harder to find suitable replacements. A trooper was compensated on a per diem basis for their horse, and if it were killed in battle their owner would be paid its value at the time of mustering. However, no compensation would be given if the horse died of any other causes, and without a horse they either had to steal one from the Yankees or take a 30-day furlough to return home and buy a new one. If a replacement could not be found, they were forced to join the infantry, an ignominious fate for a dashing cavalryman. Contemporaries remarked at the flaws in this system and the resulting loss of troopers, and how it perversely penalized the boldest as they were the most likely to have their horses shot out from under them.

The first prominent Confederate cavalry leader was J. E. B. Stuart, who achieved success in the First Battle of Bull Run against infantry. He was a flamboyant dresser and an audacious commander, wildly popular with the Southern public for his escapades in twice encircling the Army of the Potomac. These long-range reconnaissance missions accomplished little of military value but boosted Southern morale. After Stuart's death in 1864, he was replaced by Wade Hampton, who was a more mature, and arguably more effective, commander. Another Eastern commander of note was Turner Ashby, the "Black Knight of the Confederacy", who commanded Stonewall Jackson's cavalry forces in the Valley Campaign; he was killed in battle in 1862.

In the Western Theater, the most fearless, and ruthless, cavalry commander was Nathan Bedford Forrest, who achieved spectacular results with small forces but was an ineffective subordinate to the army commanders he was supposed to support, resulting in poorly coordinated battles. Much of the same issues could be said of Forrest's counterpart in the Army of Tennessee, John Hunt Morgan. In the Eastern Theater, the Partisan Ranger John Singleton Mosby succeeded in tying down upwards of 40,000 Federal troops defending rail lines and logistical hubs with only 100 to 150 irregulars. In the Trans-Mississippi Theater, John S. Marmaduke and "Jo" Shelby became prominent.

== Union cavalry ==
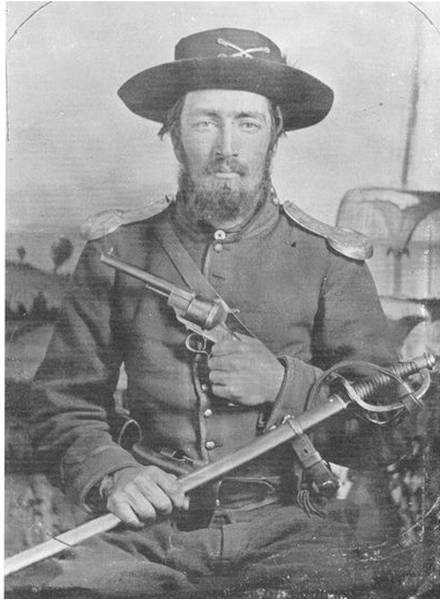
A Union cavalry soldier with saber and Lefaucheux pistol; the brass guards on his shoulders were designed to protect against saber cuts

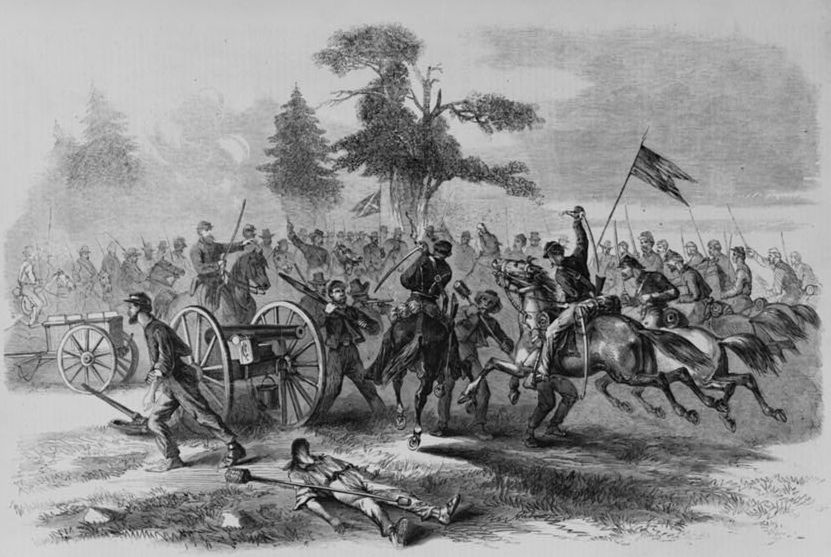
Union Cavalry capture Confederate artillery

The Union started the war with five Regular mounted regiments: the 1st and 2nd U.S. Dragoons, the 1st Mounted Rifles, and the 1st and 2nd Cavalry. These were renumbered the 1st through 5th U.S. Cavalry regiments, respectively, and a 6th was recruited. The Union was initially reluctant to enlist additional regiments, because of the expense, the understanding that training an effective cavalryman could take as long as two years, and the conventional wisdom that the rough and forested terrain of the United States, being so different from that of Western Europe, would make the deployment of Napoleonic-style cavalry forces ineffective. As the war progressed, the value of cavalry was eventually realized, and numerous state volunteer cavalry regiments were added to the army. While initially reluctant to form a large cavalry force, the Union eventually fielded some 258 mounted regiments and 170 unattached companies, of differing enlistment periods, throughout the war and suffered 10,596 killed and 26,490 wounded during the struggle.

The Union cavalry was disadvantaged at the start of the war because Northern soldiers allegedly had less comparative equestrian experience than their Southern counterparts, and the Union army did not institute an examination in basic horsemanship before a recruit was mustered into service until August 1862. In addition, over half (104 out of 176) of the experienced U.S. Army cavalry officers were Southerners, and the majority resigned their commissions to fight for the Confederacy. This included four of the five regimental colonels. With West Point's graduating class of 1861 unable to make up the deficiency, many officer positions were filled by green appointees from the civilian sector.

One advantage the Union horseman had over his opponent was the centralized horse procurement organization of the army, relieving him of any responsibility for replacing an injured horse. This responsibility was first taken over by the government on August 31, 1861, with the Quartermaster Department in charge of supplying horses for the entire army. Then in July 1863 the Cavalry Bureau was established specifically with supplying horses and equipment to Union cavalry forces. There were six large remount depots created where horses were purchased, sick and injured horses allowed to recuperate, and cavalry units gathered to drill and train. The primary depot, located at Giesboro Point along the Potomac River, was 625 acres in size and could handle 30,000 horses.

Early in the war, the Army of the Potomac did not organize its cavalry regiments into larger formations to perform independent operations, but instead paired them with infantry divisions. Here they were often wasted by being used merely as pickets, outposts, orderlies, guards for senior officers, and messengers. In July 1862 the first independent brigades were formed but were unfortunately used for many of the same roles. The first officer to make effect use of cavalry was Major General Joseph Hooker, who in February 1863 consolidated the Army of the Potomac's cavalry into a dedicated Cavalry Corps under a single commander, George Stoneman. Similar developments played out with other Union armies.

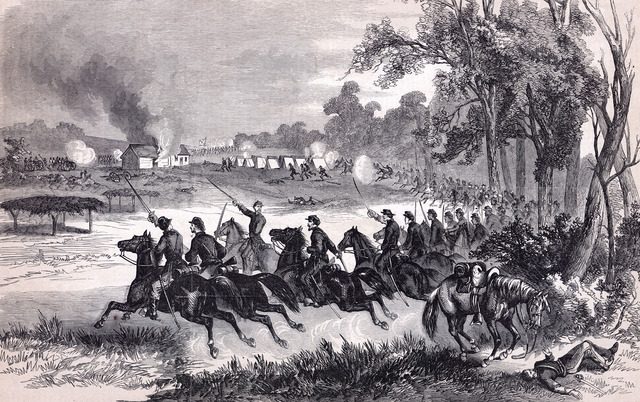
Union cavalry charge at Honey Springs, July 1863.

Halfway into the war, during the summer of 1863, the Union cavalry came into its own. Widely regarded as inferior to its Southern counterpart up until then, the Battle of Brandy Station, although tactically indecisive, is recognized as the point at which it was acknowledged to have comparable competence.

In 1864, Philip Sheridan was given command of the Cavalry Corps of the Army of the Potomac, and he deployed his horsemen in a more effective, strategic way than his predecessors. Despite the reluctance of his superior, Major General George G. Meade, Sheridan convinced General-in-Chief Ulysses S. Grant to allow him to deploy the cavalry in long-range raids, the first of which, at Yellow Tavern, resulted in the death of Confederate commander Jeb Stuart. He later employed his cavalry force effectively in the Valley Campaigns of 1864 and the Appomattox Campaign, in pursuit of Robert E. Lee.

In the Western Theater, two effective cavalry generals have not achieved the fame of their Eastern counterparts: Benjamin Grierson's dramatic raid through Mississippi was an integral part of Ulysses S. Grant's Vicksburg Campaign; James H. Wilson was invaluable in the Franklin-Nashville Campaign and in his 1865 Alabama raid.

== Significant cavalry battles and raids ==
The following are Civil War battles, campaigns, or separate raids in which cavalry forces played a significant role.

- Battle of Brandy Station — 20,500 combatants, in 1863, Pleasanton leads the largest predominantly cavalry battle of the war
- Battle of Chancellorsville — ambitious plan for raid in the Confederate rear foiled by George Stoneman's inaction
- Battle of Gaines's Mill — the first large cavalry engagement of the war
- Battle of Gettysburg, Third Day cavalry battles — East Cavalry Field and Farnsworth's Charge
- Battle of Franklin — James H. Wilson's repulse of Forrest probably saved the Union army
- Battle of Mine Creek — 9,600 cavalry, in 1864, Pleasanton leads the largest cavalry battle west of the Mississippi
- Battle of Sailor's Creek — masterful cavalry maneuvers brought Confederates close to surrender in the Appomattox Campaign.
- Battle of Selma — James H. Wilson's massive raid into Alabama in 1865
- Battle of Trevilian Station — 16,048 cavalry, in 1864, Sheridan leads largest all-cavalry battle of the war
- Battle of Yellow Tavern — J.E.B. Stuart killed in action by Philip Sheridan's cavalry
- Dahlgren's Raid — unsuccessful Union raid against Richmond
- Gettysburg campaign — numerous cavalry actions in Robert E. Lee's invasion of Pennsylvania
- Grierson's Raid — long-range raid through Mississippi in conjunction with Ulysses S. Grant's Vicksburg Campaign
- Maryland Campaign — J.E.B. Stuart's second ride around the Union army
- Peninsula Campaign — Stuart's first ride around the Union army
- Price's Raid — Sterling Price's 1864 raid in the Trans-Mississippi Theater
- Streight's Raid — 1863 raid across Alabama in which Col. Abel Streight surrendered 1,500 men to Forrest's 400
- Third Battle of Winchester — 9,300 cavalry, Sheridan battled Early in 1864, in the Shenandoah valley
- Wilson's Raid — James H. Wilson's 1865 raid through Alabama and Georgia
- Morgan's Raid — John H. Morgan's 1863 raid through Kentucky, Indiana and Ohio.

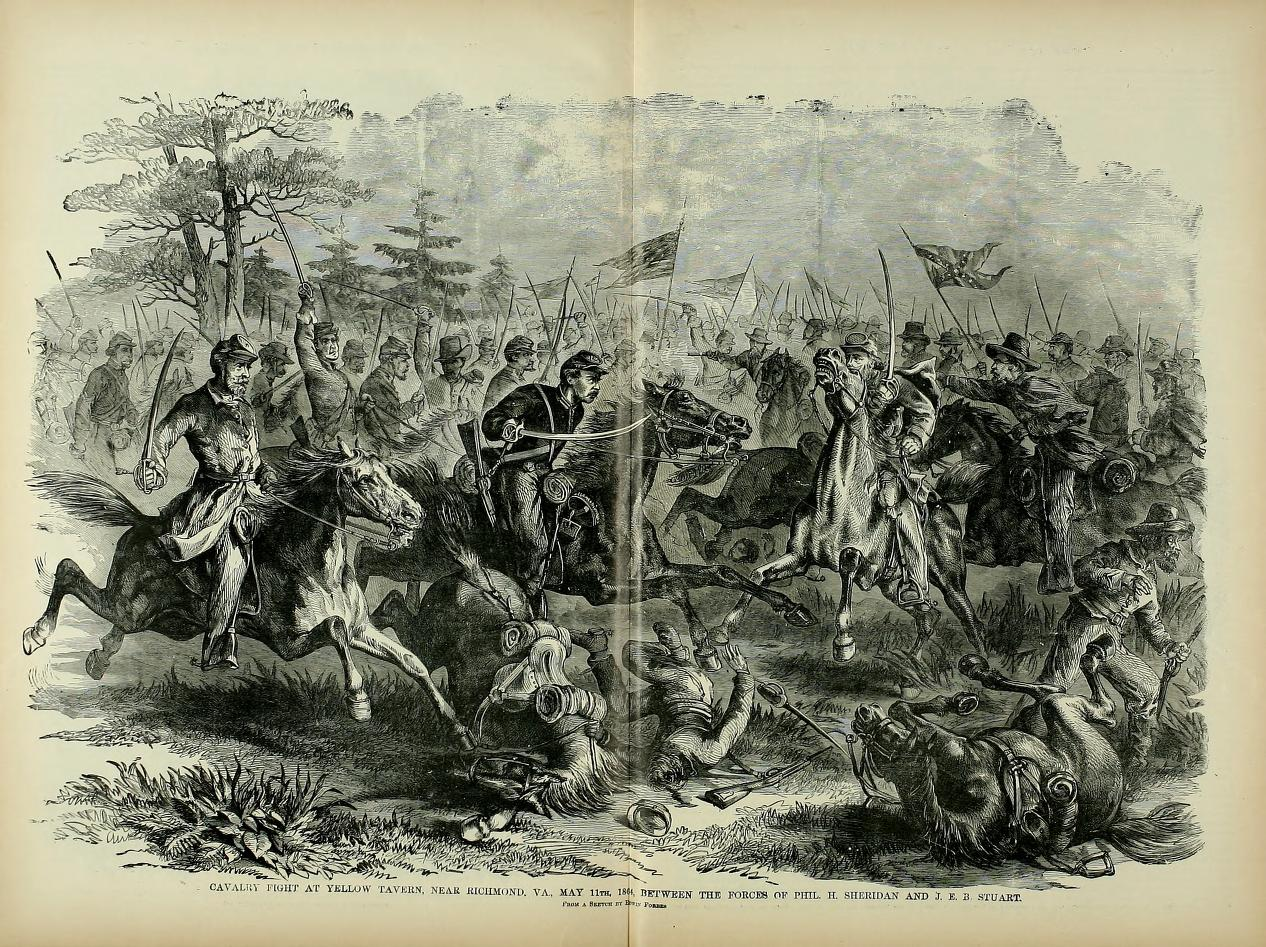
Cavalry fight at Yellow Tavern, by Edwin Forbes.

== Notable cavalry leaders and partisan rangers ==
- Turner Ashby
- William W. Averell
- John Buford
- Louis Henry Carpenter
- Philip St. George Cooke
- George Armstrong Custer
- Ulric Dahlgren
- Elon J. Farnsworth
- Nathan Bedford Forrest
- Lot Smith
- David McM. Gregg
- Benjamin Grierson
- Wade Hampton
- John D. Imboden
- Frank James
- Jesse James
- Albert G. Jenkins
- William E. "Grumble" Jones
- Judson Kilpatrick
- Fitzhugh Lee
- W.H.F. "Rooney" Lee
- John S. Marmaduke
- Wesley Merritt
- John Hunt Morgan
- John S. Mosby
- John Pelham
- Alfred Pleasonton
- William Quantrill
- Beverly Robertson
- Thomas L. Rosser
- Joseph O. "Jo" Shelby
- Philip Sheridan
- Lot Smith
- David S. Stanley
- George Stoneman
- J.E.B. Stuart
- Alfred Thomas Torbert
- Earl Van Dorn
- John A. Wharton
- Joseph Wheeler
- James H. Wilson
- Cole Younger

== See also ==
- List of horse of the American Civil War
