= Earl Sloan =

Doctor Earl Sawyer Sloan (born September 8, 1848, Zanesfield, Ohio, died September 13, 1923, Boston, Massachusetts) was an American entrepreneur and philanthropist. His parents were Andrew Sloan and Susan Bass Clark Sloan.

== Early life and family ==
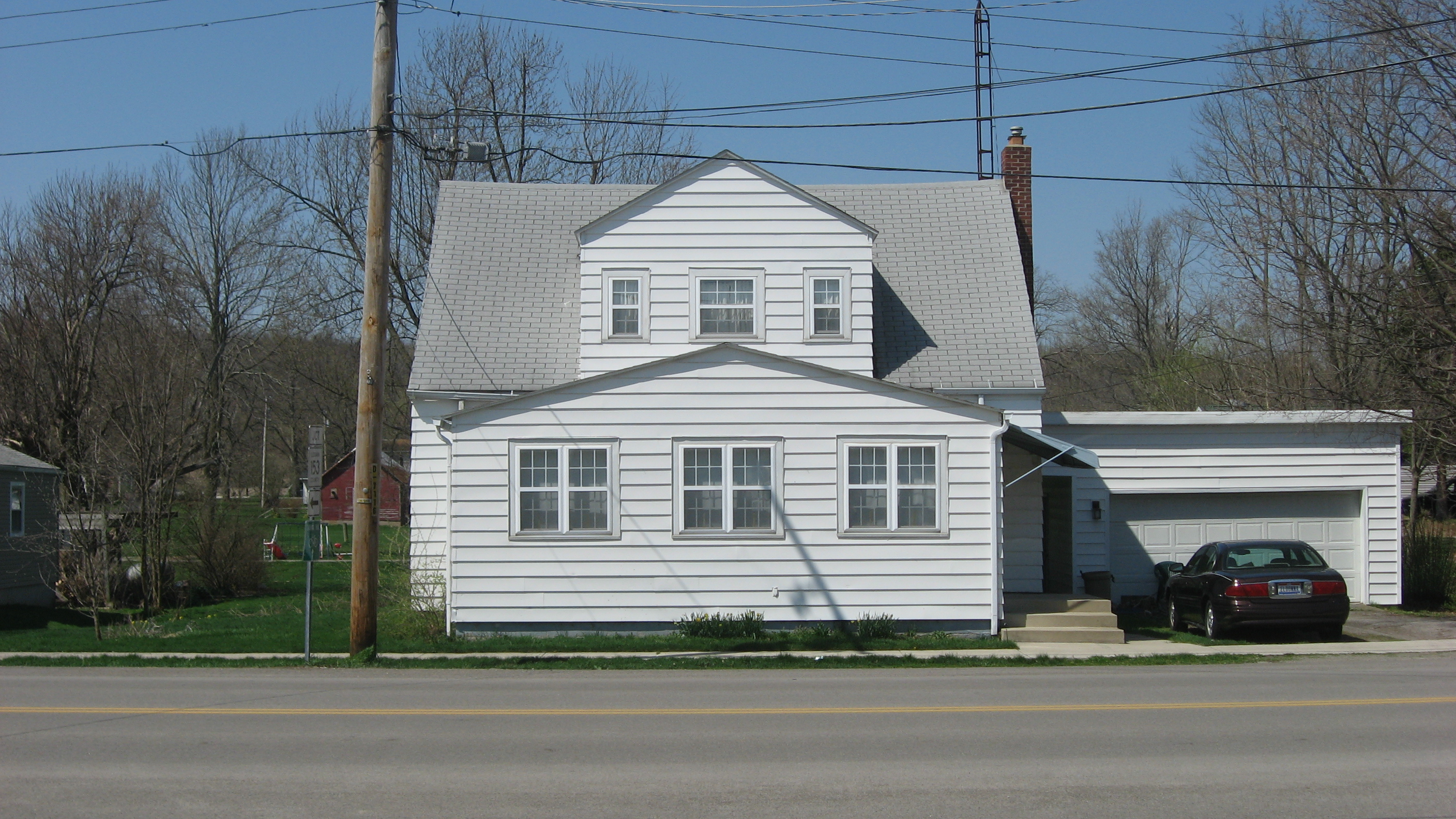
Site of the now-destroyed Sloan log house

The Sloan family emigrated from Ireland in the early nineteenth century following the American Revolution; Earl's father settled in Venango County, Pennsylvania.

The family home was a small log house on Sandusky Street in Zanesfield. Earl's father was a horse harness maker, who served as a pioneer veterinary surgeon for central Ohio, and he bought and sold horses for the army during the Civil War. He had a certain ability with horses and spent as much time caring for animals as he did in mending saddles. From a formula reportedly given to him by the Indians (though this is uncertain), Andrew made a strong-smelling brown concoction that was applied to horses' shoulders when they stiffened from the spring ploughing. The formula grew to be in great demand in the area.

Andrew Sloan pursued his skill with healing animals until he was a self-taught veterinarian, becoming known as the "Village Vet" and "Doc Sloan". A notice that appeared in the Logan County Gazette on September 6, 1856, advertised:

Dr. Andrew Sloan takes this method of informing his old friends, who have so liberally patronized him for many years, that he is now prepared to practice as a Veterinary Surgeon, and will attend to any call in his profession in Logan and adjoining counties. Dr. S. professes to cure Poll Evil, Spavin, Splints, Curb, Callous, Sweney, Shoulder-jam, or any other disease, external or internal. So bring on your cripples. Residence at Zanesfield.
ANDREW SLOAN.

N.B. Dr Sloan is prepared to furnish stable or pasture for horses from a distance. Medicines of all sorts furnished, and prescriptions given. - Charges reasonable.

Earl attended school in Zanesfield's old school building, directly across the street from his home. He did not attend more than the elementary grades, but did learn to read and developed a great appreciation for books.

Townspeople recalled that Earl was mischievous as a youth and objected to the nickname "Spider" that was attached to him for reasons unknown.

Under the tutelage of Frank Pope, Earl also became a harness-maker, beginning his apprenticeship at the age of fifteen.

== Entrance into the market ==
In 1871, a 23-year-old Earl, armed with several bottles of his father's horse liniment, joined with his brother Foreman in St. Louis, Missouri, where Foreman was engaged in the buying and shipping of horses. This time period immediately following the Civil War marked the heyday of the horse in American life. Consequently, the Sloan liniment formula was in great demand. For about twenty-five years, Earl and his brother peddled their remedy from farm to farm, and also worked the horse fairs and carnivals.

At some point in the brothers' venture, someone applied the liniment to his back, discovering that it relieved his own discomfort, as well. Thereafter, the Sloan brothers began selling even more of the liniment advertising it as "good for man and beast".

Earl risked the money necessary for advertisements in Chicago's streetcars, and in time, the orders for the liniment multiplied.

== Later years ==
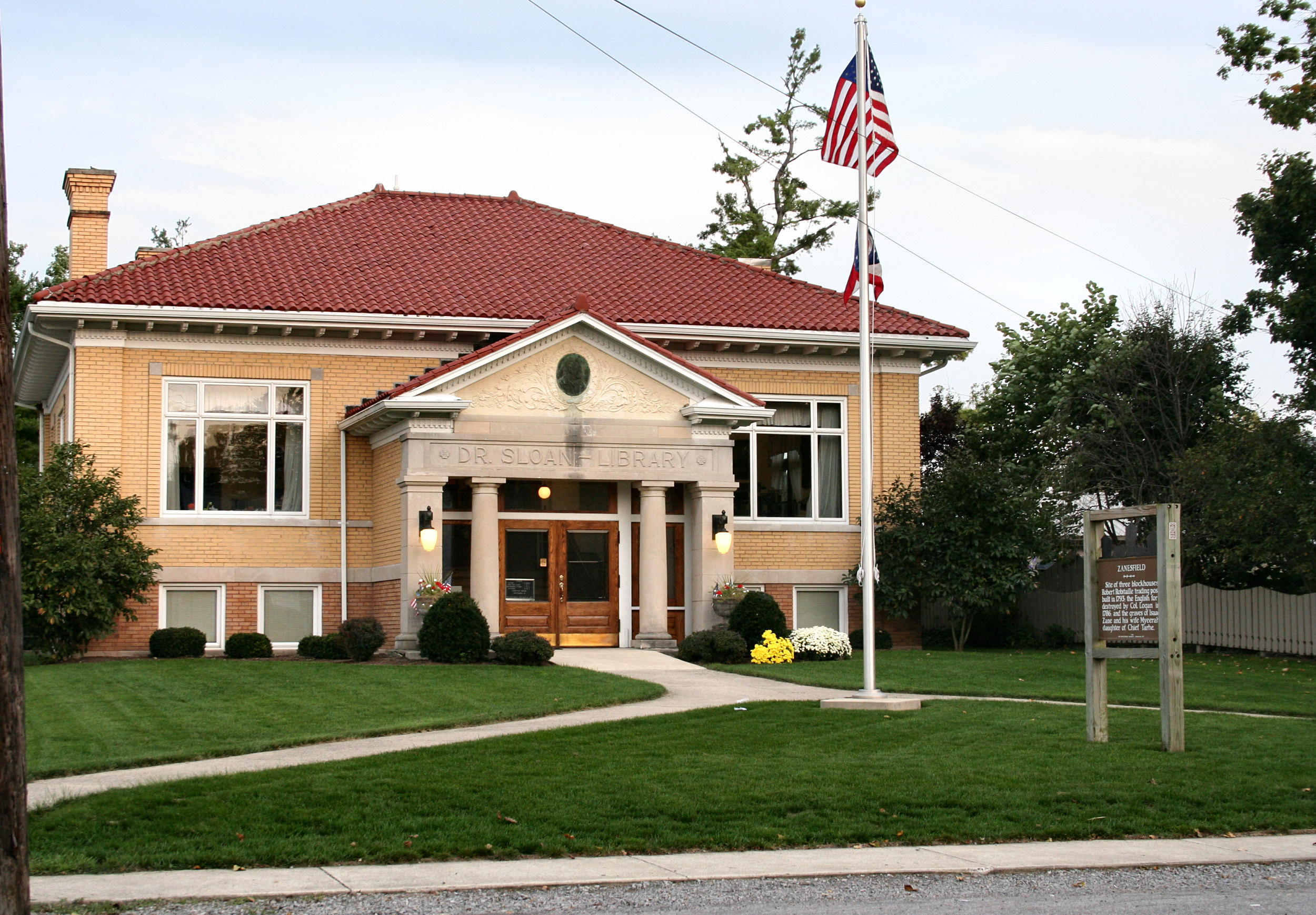
Sloan Library in Zanesfield, built with money donated by Sloan

On February 8, 1899, at the age of fifty, Earl Sloan married Bertha Woolaver (occasionally spelled "Wolaver"), a Newport native, who had gone to Boston to pursue a nursing career. Just prior to their engagement, Earl had been having dinner at Bertha's father's house in Nova Scotia, and had asked for an introduction. What followed was a whirlwind courtship, followed soon after by Earl's proposal to her, giving her two weeks to prepare for their wedding and a trip to Europe afterward, which would serve as both a honeymoon and a business trip. The couple never had children.

In 1900, Foreman Sloan left the business, but Earl continued, adopting his father's title "Doctor" and organizing a company to manufacture the liniment. The company offices were moved to Boston in 1904 when Dr. Sloan purchased a large factory building, formerly owned by Green's Nervura Medicine Company. On October 26 of that same year, the business was incorporated as "Dr. Earl S. Sloan, Incorporated." Records in the office of the Secretary of State for the Commonwealth of Massachusetts disclose that the authorized capital for the new corporation consists of $50,000, $10 per parcel. The principals of the new corporation were Dr. Sloan, Archie MacKeigan, and Andrew Sloan, who served as the Treasurer. A business report of the time indicated that "the concern is recorded as one of the largest of its kind and goods are sold extensively throughout the country."

Dr. Sloan's business grew rapidly due to his advertising efforts. He was particularly fond of newspaper advertising. Dr. Sloan's promotional efforts included frequent travel. A newspaper article from 1907 announced that he had completed arrangements for an extended trip through Great Britain and Europe during the summer months of that year.

Dr. and Mrs. Sloan made their home at Pine Lodge in Roxbury, Massachusetts. It was purchased in 1909 and included 9 acres (36,000 m^{2}), located on the east side of Cottage Avenue. <looking at the online Bromley maps from 1905 and 1924 it appears that the Cottage Avenue home was in the West Roxbury neighborhood of Boston; Cottage Avenue was renamed Saint Theresa Avenue--edit added 5/15/26>. In all, the house included twelve rooms, three baths, and nine fireplaces, and was luxuriantly furnished.

== End of Sloan's ownership of the business ==
On May 29, 1913, the principals of William R. Warner & Co. entered into an agreement for the purchase of Dr. Sloan's business. The transaction was completed in July of that year, with Warner & Co. taking over all the assets and property. A letterhead of that time included a notice that Dr. Sloan had offices in Ontario, England, Australia, and Amsterdam. Notes also exist on the sales of the liniment in the Netherlands and South America.

The big seller that year was the 25-cent-size bottle of liniment; other sizes were retailed at fifty cents and one dollar.
