= Sickle-hocked =

Animal disorder

A sickle-hocked leg structure is one in which the back leg joints of an animal, usually a horse or other equine mammal, are set with too much angle, resulting in the hock also being excessively angled. This can result in uneven hoof wear, which is incredibly painful for the affected horse. If the leg joints are not set properly, there is a high chance that the back joints are also set incorrectly, resulting in a poorly conformed horse.

Horses with sickle-hocks are at an increased risk of developing thoroughpin, curb and bog or bone spavins. Very severe cases of sickle-hocks can result in permanent lameness and may require euthanization to prevent further pain. However, many horses with sickle-hock are not affected to this degree, and may live a life with uneven wearing hooves. Corrective shoeing can help the horse's balance and strength. Horses with sickle-hocks should be monitored closely for signs of lameness, and if possible a veterinarian should be consulted before extensive exercise.

In cases of breeding, it is generally considered unwise to continue breeding a mare or stallion with sickle-hocks, as the trait is often passed to the offspring.

Other animals who have this condition include, but are not limited to, cattle, sheep, and other types of livestock.

== See also ==
- Cow-hocked
- Knock-kneed
- Post-legged
- Bow-leg
