= Spavin =

Spavin is a condition in livestock. It may refer to:

- Bone spavin, a type of osteoarthritis that often causes lameness
- Bog spavin, a swelling condition that does not cause lameness, but may be produced by something that does

== See also ==
- Alan Spavin (1942–2016), English former footballer
