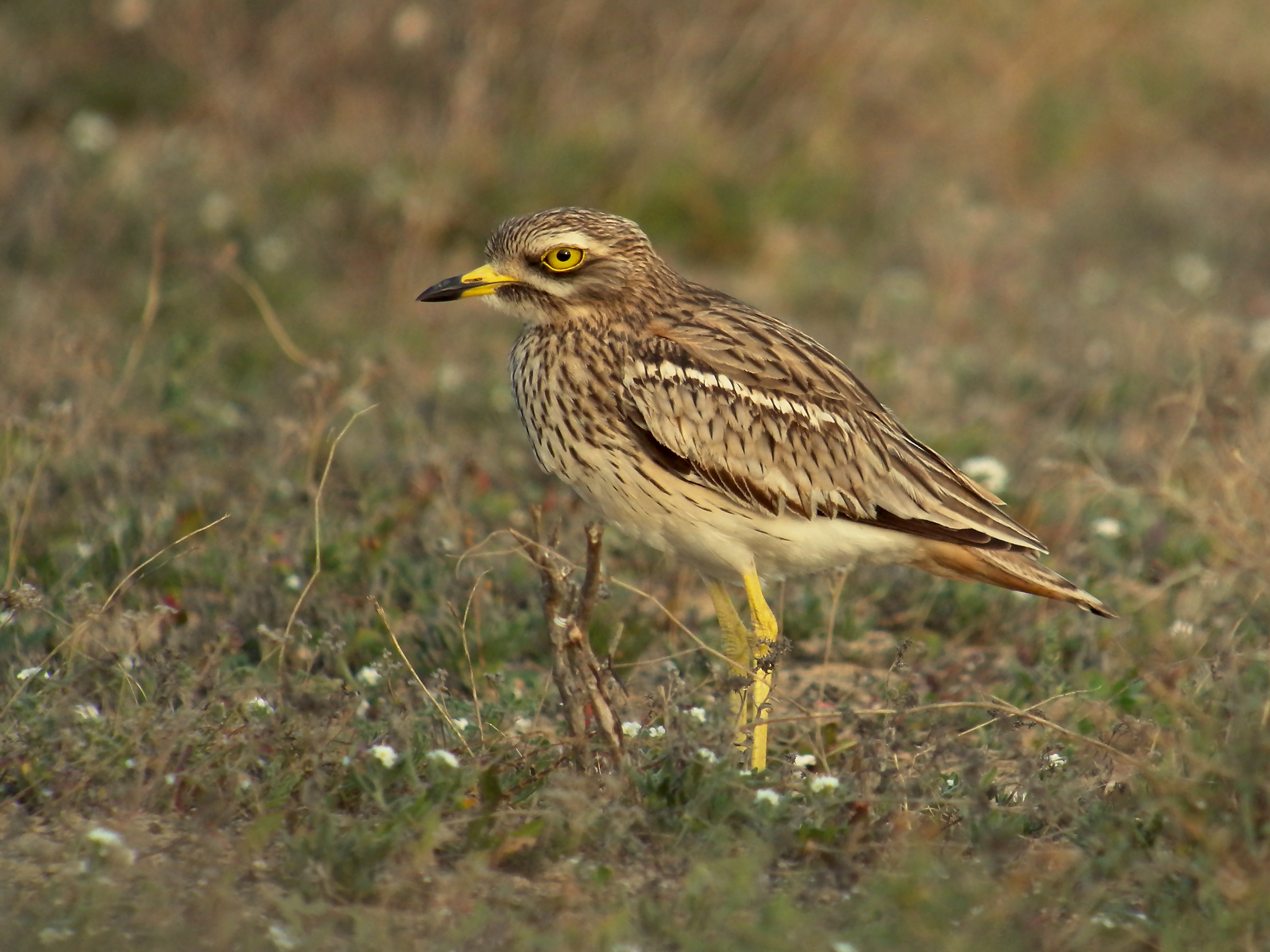

Conservation status
- Least Concern (IUCN 3.1)

Scientific classification
- Kingdom: Animalia
- Phylum: Chordata
- Class: Aves
- Order: Charadriiformes
- Family: Burhinidae
- Genus: Burhinus
- Species: B. oedicnemus

Binomial name
- Burhinus oedicnemus (Linnaeus, 1758)
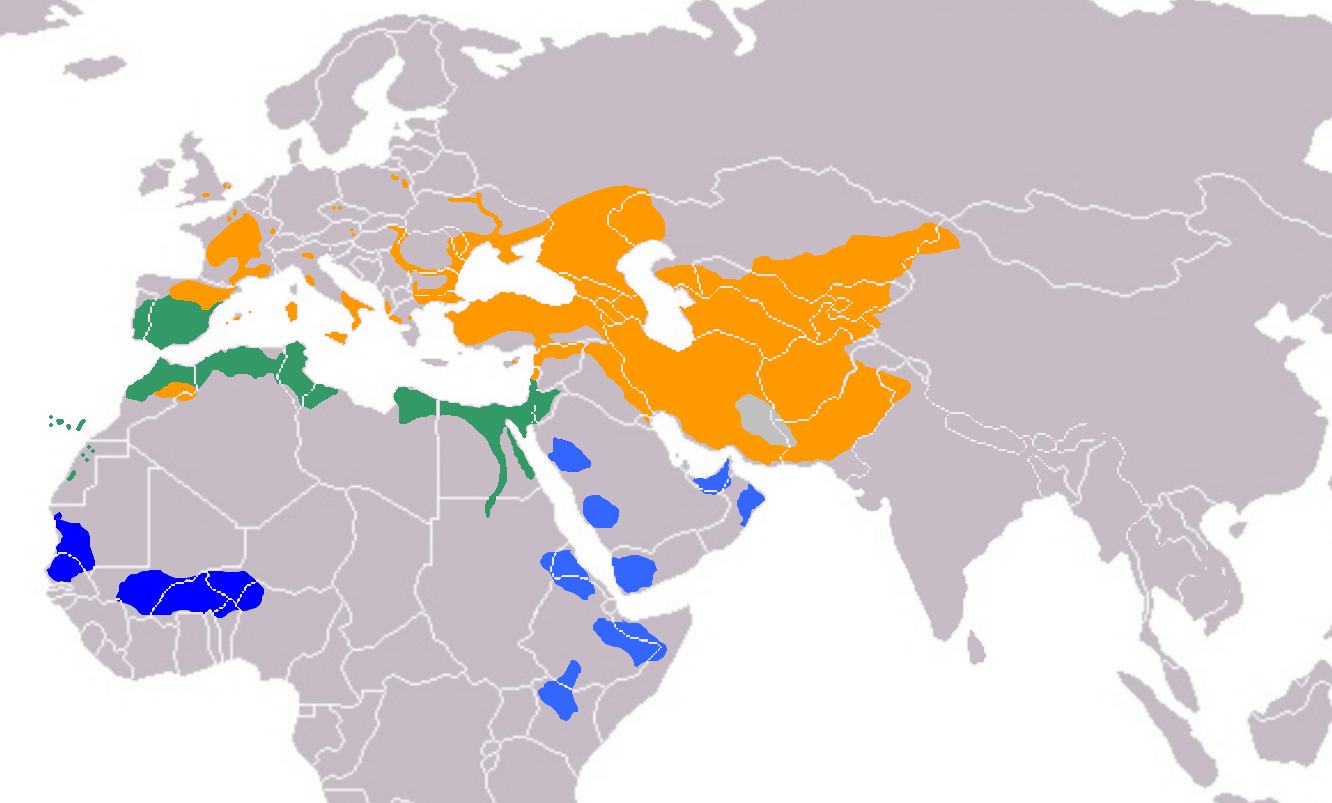
- Range of B. oedicnemus Breeding range Year-round range Wintering range

Synonyms
- Charadrius oedicnemus Linnaeus, 1758

= Eurasian stone-curlew =

Species of bird

The Eurasian stone-curlew, Eurasian thick-knee, or simply stone-curlew (Burhinus oedicnemus), is a northern species of the Burhinidae (stone-curlew) bird family.

== Taxonomy ==
The Eurasian stone-curlew was formally named by the Swedish naturalist Carl Linnaeus in 1758 in the tenth edition of his Systema Naturae under the binomial name Charadrius oedicnemus. He specified the type locality as England. The name Oedicnemus had been used earlier as the genus name of the species by the French naturalist Pierre Belon in 1555. The species is now placed in the genus Burhinus that was introduced by the German zoologist Johann Karl Wilhelm Illiger in 1811. The genus name combines the Greek bous meaning "ox" with rhis meaning "nose". The species name oedicnemus combines the Greek oidio meaning "to swell", and kneme meaning "shin" or "leg", referring to the bird's prominent tibiotarsal joints, which also give it the common name of "thick-knee". This is an abbreviated form of Thomas Pennant's 1776 coinage "thick-kneed bustard".

The name "stone curlew" was recorded by Francis Willughby in 1678 as a "third sort of Godwit, which in Cornwall they call the Stone-Curlew, differing from the precedent in that it hath a much shorter and slenderer Bill than either of them". It derives from the bird's nocturnal calls sounding like the only distantly related Eurasian curlew Numenius arquata and its preference for barren stony heaths.

Five subspecies are recognised:

- B. o. oedicnemus (Linnaeus, 1758) – west, south Europe to the Balkans, Ukraine and Caucasus
- B. o. distinctus (Bannerman, 1914) – west Canary Islands
- B. o. insularum (Sassi, 1908) – east Canary Islands
- B. o. saharae (Reichenow, 1894) – north Africa and the Mediterranean islands to Iraq and Iran
- B. o. harterti Vaurie, 1963 – west Kazakhstan to Pakistan and northwest India

The Indian stone-curlew Burhinus indicus was previously considered as a subspecies of the Eurasian stone-curlew.

== Description ==
The Eurasian stone-curlew is a fairly large wader, though mid-sized by the standards of its family. Length ranges from 38 to 46 cm (15 to 18 in), wingspan from 76 to 88 cm (30 to 35 in) and weight from 290 to 535 g (10.2 to 18.9 oz). with a strong yellow and black beak, large yellow eyes (which give it a "reptilian", or "goggle-eyed" appearance), and cryptic plumage. The bird is striking in flight, with black and white wing markings.

== Distribution and habitat ==
The Eurasian stone-curlew occurs throughout Europe, north Africa and southwestern Asia. It is a summer migrant in the more temperate European and Asian parts of its range, wintering in Africa. Despite being classed as a wader, this species prefers dry open habitats with some bare ground.

== Behaviour and ecology ==
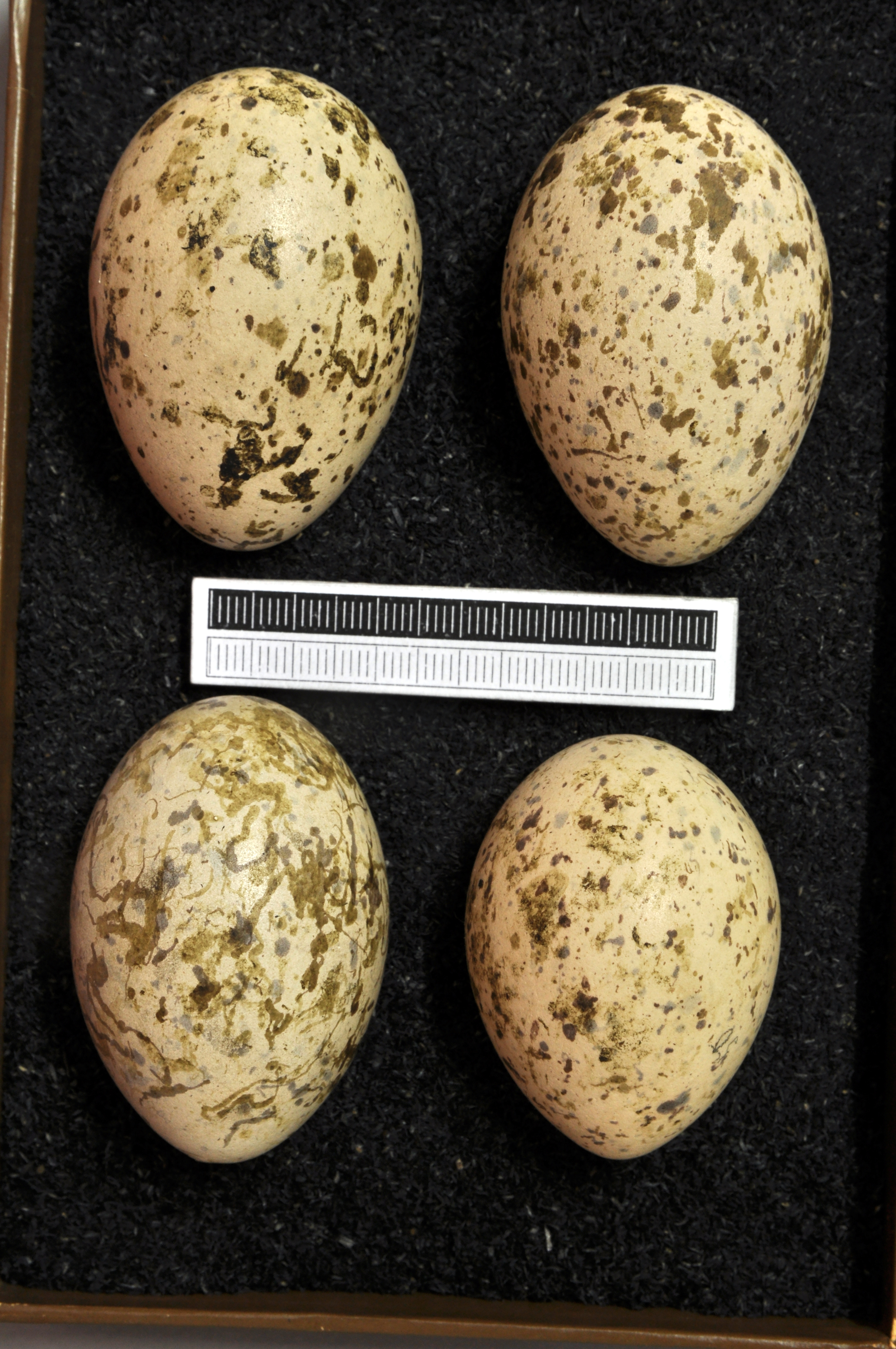
Eggs in the Museum Wiesbaden collection

The Eurasian stone-curlew is largely nocturnal, particularly when singing its loud wailing songs, which are reminiscent of that of curlews. Food consists of insects and other small invertebrates, and occasionally small reptiles, frogs and rodents.

=== Breeding ===
Eurasian stone-curlews probably first breed when they are three years old. The eggs are laid at two day intervals in a scrape on open ground. The clutch normally consists of 2 eggs which are on average 54 mm × 38 mm (2.1 in × 1.5 in). The eggs are pale buff and are variably spotted, streaked or blotched with brown or purple grey. Both sexes incubate the eggs beginning after the last egg is laid. The eggs hatch after 24–26 days. The precocial young leave the nest soon after hatching and are then cared for by both parents for 36–42 days. Normally only a single brood is raised each year but a replacement clutch is laid after the loss of eggs or the loss of small young.

The maximum recorded age recorded from ring-recovery data within the British Isles is 22 years and 4 months for a bird ringed as a nestling in Suffolk in 1990 and caught again in Suffolk in 2012.

== Status ==
Although the International Union for Conservation of Nature currently categorizes the Eurasian stone-curlew as a least-concern species, some populations have shown declines due to agricultural intensification. For example, a study conducted in France between 1998 and 2016 observed a 26% population decline over a 14-year period.

== Sources ==
- Cramp, Stanley, ed. (1983). "Burhinus oedicnemus Stone Curlew". Handbook of the Birds of Europe the Middle East and North Africa. The Birds of the Western Palearctic. Vol. III: Hawks to Bustards. Oxford: Oxford University Press. pp. 67–80. ISBN 978-0-19-857506-1.
- Lockwood, W.B. (1993). The Oxford Dictionary of British Bird Names. Oxford: Oxford University Press. ISBN 978-0-19-866196-2.
