= Hock (anatomy) =

Anatomical region

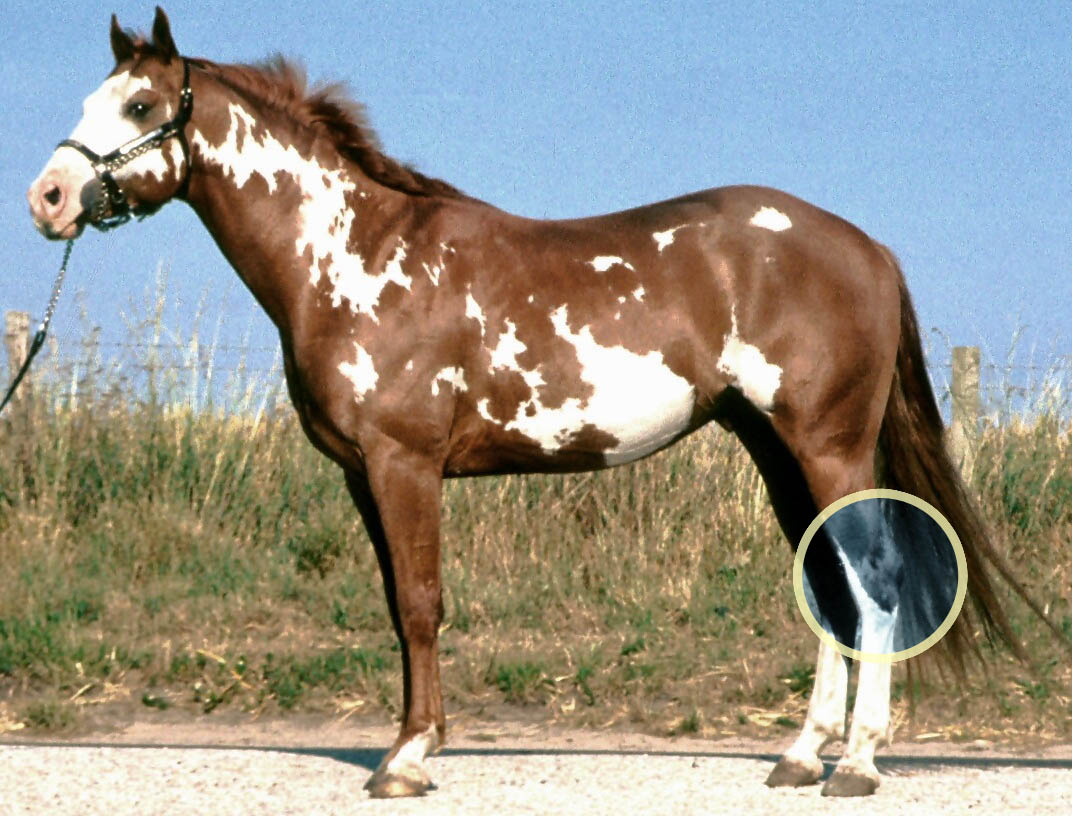
Diagram showing the location of the hock.

The hock, tarsus or uncommonly gambrel, is the region formed by the tarsal bones connecting the tibia and metatarsus of a digitigrade or unguligrade quadrupedal mammal, such as a horse, cat, or dog. This joint may include articulations between tarsal bones and the fibula in some species (such as cats), while in others the fibula has been greatly reduced and is only found as a vestigial remnant fused to the distal portion of the tibia (as in horses). It is the anatomical homologue of the ankle of the human foot. While homologous joints occur in other tetrapods, the term is generally restricted to mammals, particularly long-legged domesticated species.

== Horse ==
The terms tarsus and hock refer to the region between the gaskin (crus) and cannon regions (metatarsus), which includes the bones, joints, and soft tissues of the area. The hock is especially important in equine anatomy, due to the great strain it receives when the horse is worked. Jumping, quick turns or stops, and movements that require collection, are some of the more stressful activities.

=== Primary bones and joints of the horse hock ===
In the horse, the hock consists of the following bones:

- Talus
- Calcaneus
- Central tarsal bone
- Fused 1st and 2nd tarsal bone
- 3rd and 4th tarsal bones
- 2nd, 3rd, and 4th metatarsal bones

The horse hock consists of multiple joints, namely:

- Tibiotarsal or tarsocrural joint
- Proximal intertarsal joint or talocalcanealcentroquartal joint
- Distal intertarsal joint or centrodistal joint
- Tarsometatarsal joint
- Talocalcaneal joint

=== Equine disease states ===
- Horses may suffer from "capped hock", which is caused by the creation of a false bursa, a synovial sac beneath the skin. Capped hock is usually caused by trauma such as kicking or slipping when attempting to stand. In the absence of a wound, it does not require immediate veterinary attention and is usually only of cosmetic significance. On the other hand, a wound into the calcanean bursa is a serious problem. A capped hock is extremely unlikely to be a cause of lameness, even if severe.
- Osteochondrosis dissecans, or OCD is a developmental defect in the cartilage or of cartilage and bone seen in particular locations on the surface of the tarsocrural joint. This condition is typically discovered when the horse is young, and is one cause of bog spavin. After surgery to remove bone and cartilage fragments most horses can return to full work.
- Distension of the tibiotarsal joint with excessive joint fluid and/or synovium is called bog spavin.
- Degenerative joint disease of the tarsometatarsal and/or distal intertarsal joint is referred to as bone spavin.
- Curb, or tarsal plantar desmitis, is traditionally considered a sprain of the plantar ligament, which runs down the back of the hock, serving functionally as a tension band connecting the calcaneus, the fourth tarsal bone and the fourth metatarsal bone. Recent work has shown that curb can be caused by damage to one of many soft tissue structures in this region.
- Stringhalt

=== Conformational defects ===
Also see equine conformation

Because the hock takes a great deal of strain in all performance disciplines, correct conformation is essential if the horse is to have a sound and productive working life. Common conformational defects include sickle hocks, post-legged conformation/straight hocks, cow hocks, and bowed hocks. Depending on the use of the horse, some defects may be more acceptable than others.

== See also ==
- Ham hock
- Ankle
- Fetlock
- Heel
- Limbs of the horse
- Hock burns
