= Post-legged =

Jiont condition in animals

Post-legged describes a condition in which the joints in an animal are not set correctly. When an animal is post-legged, the leg joints are far too straight, with almost no bend in the legs. Four-legged animals must have some bend in the hocks, otherwise the hooves would wear unevenly, and this may result in lameness, or at least a rougher gait. The animal will not stand squarely on the ground, and this also increases the possibility of injury to the animal.

When an animal is post-legged, the animal will have a much higher risk of lameness, perhaps even permanent. This means the animal can hardly move at all, and results in an extremely stressed animal. This may also result in the animal not being able to move to food, and could be life-threatening. Also, since the animal is in such pain, it may be so stressed that it won't calve well, and it will not produce good quality milk, -or any milk at all- in a cow.

Animals with a problem in their leg joints are recommended to be removed from the breeding line, as this condition will only pass on, and cause much pain and suffering to the young of this species. Also, animals with an incorrect joint placement such as this will not do well in the ring at agricultural shows. This condition may affect cattle, horses, sheep, and many other livestock animals.

== See also ==
- Cow-hocked
- Sickle-hocked
- Bow-leg
