= Curb in horses =

Swelling on horse rear leg

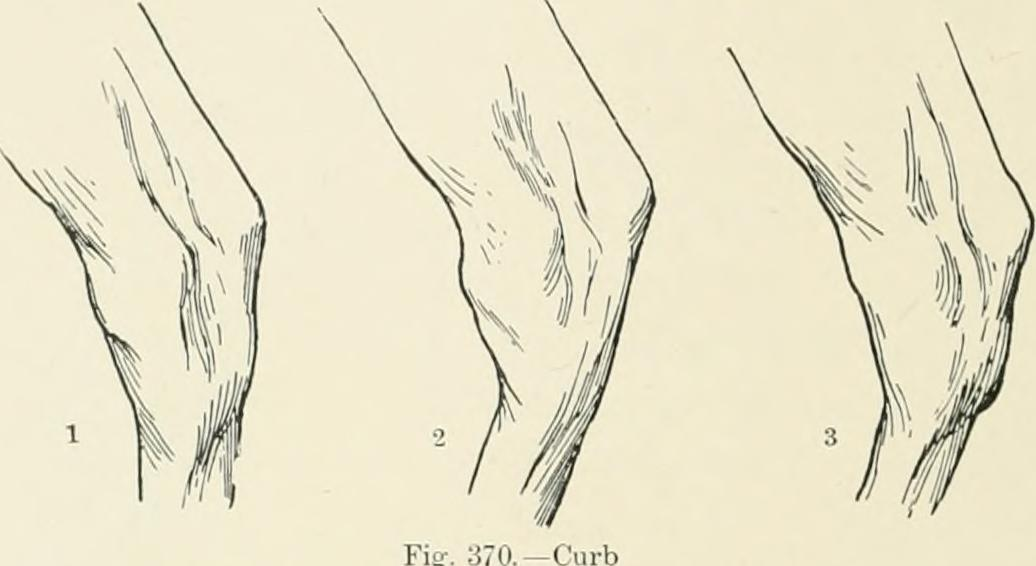
1906 drawing of curbs on rear legs

A curb is a swelling on the lower rear of a horse's hock. It is defined in older literature as enlargement secondary to inflammation and thickening of the long plantar ligament in horses. Since the advent of ultrasound examination, it has become apparent that this is not a single condition, but actually a mixture between injuries to various structures and soft tissue swelling.

== Structures affected ==
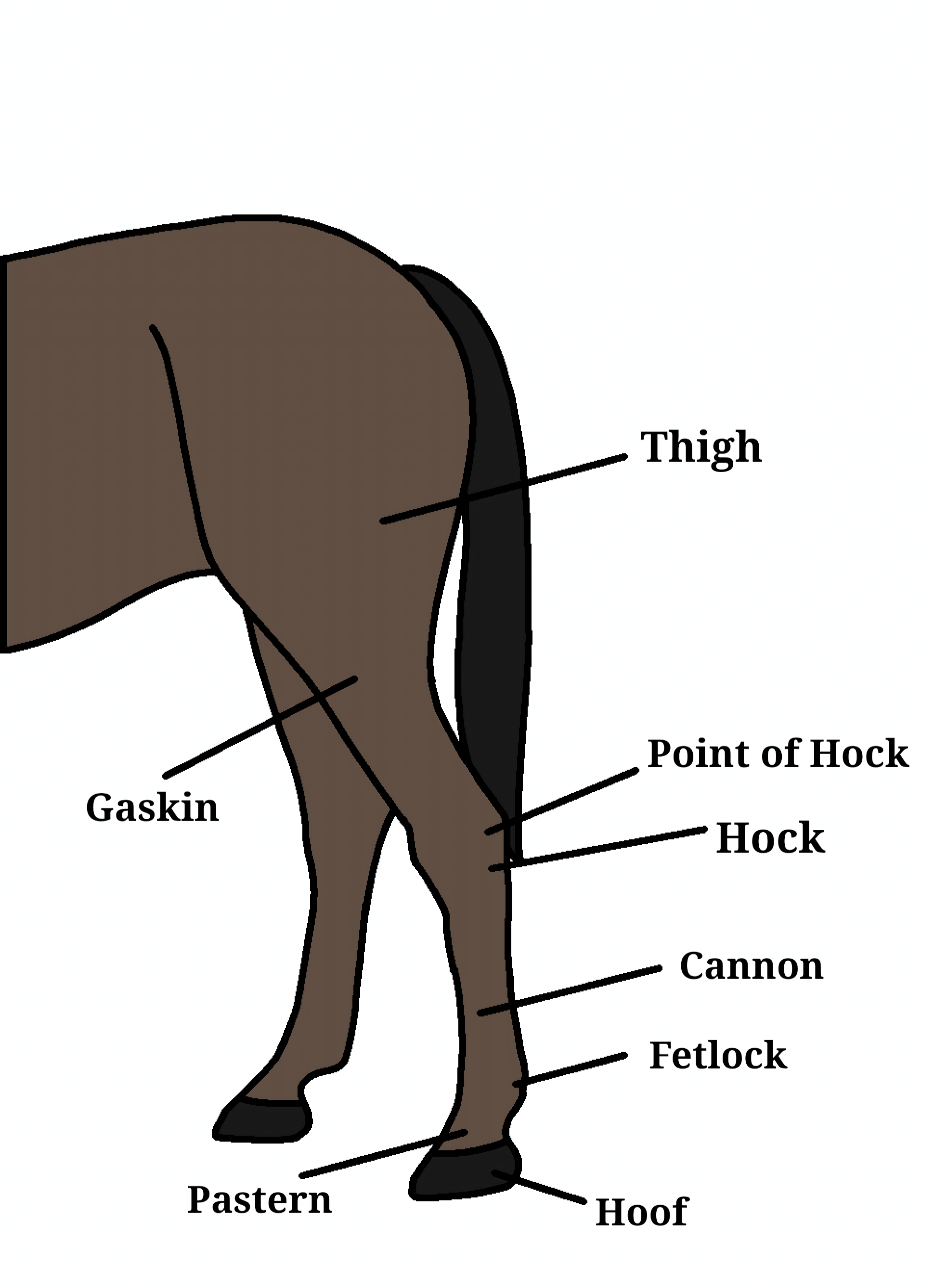
Horse's hind legs diagram

Besides swelling in the long plantar ligament, injury to the deep digital flexor tendon, superficial digital flexor tendon, tarsocrural lateral collateral ligament or peritendinous / periligamentous tissues in this region can contribute to the appearance of curb. Sickle-hocked conformation is a predisposing risk factor for the development of curb.

Fluid accumulation and/or swelling are almost always found in the peritendonous / periligamentous tissues in curb, often with no additional underlying injuries. Injury to the superficial digital flexor tendon as a cause of curb is as common as injury to the long plantar ligament. Injury to the deep digital flexor tendon as a cause of curb is less common, and collateral ligament desmitis in the tarsocrural joint is uncommon. A combination of injury to the long plantar ligament and tendon of the gastrocnemius is also seen.

== Diagnosis ==
Ultrasonographic examination is crucial to determine the most appropriate treatment and accurate prognosis. Horses with curb swellings may also have associated hock problems, such as osteoarthritis, and it’s important that the source of the pain is accurately identified.

In the initial, more acute phase, curb often presents with clear inflammation and noticeable lameness. Depending on the cause, when the swelling becomes chronic, the affected area may feel firm and fibrous, lacking heat or tenderness, with no lameness or only mild signs. With a more significant injury involving the deep or superficial digital flexor tendon, lameness may persist.

== Treatment ==
Treatment and prognosis are highly dependent on the diagnosis. Generally speaking, stall rest is considered to be the most effective method of treatment during the acute phase no matter the diagnosis. In the early phase of the swelling, pain may be managed through the use of anti-inflammatory medications like phenylbutazone, ice, and bandages. Horses with only periligamentous/peritendinous swelling can often return to work relatively quickly, while those with a tear in the superficial or deep digital flexor tendon require a longer controlled rehabilitation. Healing of tendon or ligament injuries typically requires a period of three to several months of a controlled graduated exercise program, after which most horses make a full recovery with no permanent effects. Less commonly, if the swelling is caused by external trauma, wounds could potentially communicate with tendon sheaths or bone.
