= Sweney =

Sweney is a surname. Notable people with the surname include:

- John R. Sweney (1837–1899), American gospel composer
- Joseph Henry Sweney (1845–1918), U.S. Congressman from Iowa
- Susan Sweney (1915–1983), British radio broadcaster for the Nazis in World War II, daughter of Cyril Sweney
