= Bone spavin =

Joint condition in horses and cattle

Bone spavin is a bony growth within the lower hock joint of horses or cattle. It is caused by osteoarthritis, and the degree of lameness that results can be serious enough to end a horse's competitive career.

== Description ==
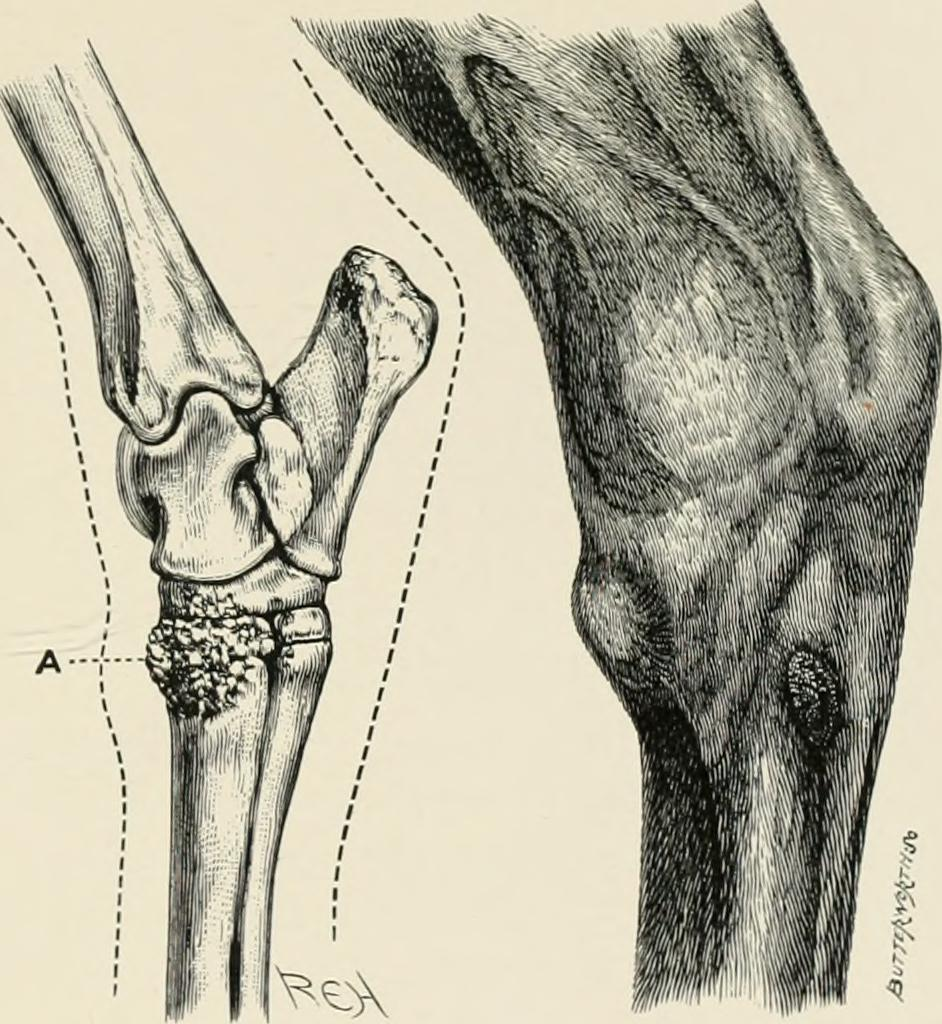
Bone spavin indicated by A.

Bone spavin is osteoarthritis, or the final phase of degenerative joint disease (DJD), in the lower three hock joints. It usually affects the two lowest joints of the hock (the tarsometatarsal and the distal intertarsal joints), with the third joint, the proximal intertarsal, being the least likely to develop bone spavin. This condition has various types: jack spavin when there is significant bony enlargement over the tarsal bones, and high spavin when the pathology occurs higher in the joint than is typical. Conversely, occult spavin does not produce any significant exostoses on the small tarsals, whilst bog spavin and blood spavin do not involve bony changes.

== Causes ==
=== Cartilage compression ===
Excessive compression can cause, over time, the cartilage between the upper and lower surfaces of the lower tarsal bones to become compressed and eroded. The joint spaces then become smaller, and new bone growth may occur in the area.

=== Uneven loading ===
Uneven loading causes excessive compression of the cartilage and bone on one side, and strain in the joint capsule and supporting ligaments on the other side. When the joint is repeatedly overloaded on the edge of its surface, exostoses, or "bone spurs," occur. Strain of the supporting ligaments can cause exostosis around the joint as well.

== Contributing factors ==
There are several conformational defects that contribute to bone spavin. Those that cause uneven loading of the hocks, such as sickle hocks and cow hocks, are especially noteworthy. Poor trimming or shoeing can also contribute to bone spavin in any horse, no matter what their conformation.

Certain types of activities may also contribute to uneven or repeated loading of the lower hock joints, and thus bone spavin. These include sports that require a great deal of hock flexion (dressage), stress (jumping), sudden stops or turns (western events, such as reining), or a great deal of concussion (Standardbred racing).

"Juvenile spavin" is the occurrence of bone spavin in horses less than 3 years old. It usually occurs before the animal has done much work. While osteochondrosis lesions are the likely cause in some cases, this condition can also occur secondary to the distortion of the cuboidal bones which can occur in premature or dysmature foals.

== Typical signs ==
Initially, signs of bone spavin may include sporadic and vague hindlimb lameness. Some horses may become uncomfortable in one lead, or may demonstrate stiffness walking downhill.

In many cases lameness worsens, becoming more obvious and consistent. Advanced cases may have a bony swelling on the hock, typically on the inside of the joint. Lameness, although usually worse in one leg, is commonly bilateral.

The affected limb usually lands toe-first, wearing down that foot faster than the other. The affected limb usually has a shorter, lower arc than the other foot, as the horse is trying to reduce the painful flexion of the joint, so the leg appears to drag.

A flexion test of an affected limb often produces a temporary worsening of the lameness. Such a response to a flexion test would support the diagnosis of bone spavin. A flexion test involves holding the hock in forced flexion for a period of time before trotting the horse away immediately.

== Diagnosis ==
A provisional diagnosis of bone spavin should usually be supported by further investigation in order to confirm the diagnosis.

=== X-ray ===
Typical radiographic changes include spurs, new bone, bone destruction and/or joint narrowing or loss.

=== Intra-articular local anaesthesia ===
Anaesthesia of an affected joint is a more definitive way of confirming the presence of pain arising from that joint. Introduction of local anaesthetic into a joint should abolish or at least significantly lessen the lameness. This technique is not absolutely specific, as the distal pouches of the tarsometatarsal joint are immediately adjacent to the suspensory ligament. This means that anaesthetic in the tarsometatarsal joint can occasionally desensitize pain arising from suspensory ligament, giving the false impression that joint pain had been the cause of the lameness.

=== Scintigraphy ===
Scintigraphy (bone scan) can help to differentiate between suspensory origin desmitis and bone spavin.

== Treatment ==
Bony changes of the lower hock joint are irreversible. It is possible, however, to manage the problem and thereby slow the progression of the bone spavin, ease the pain, and control the lameness. Surgery is an option for horses that do not respond to conventional treatments.

=== Medications ===
NSAIDs, or non-steroidal anti-inflammatory drugs, may help improve the lameness in the horse. However, high doses of NSAIDs given over several days can cause kidney damage, as well as ulcers and right dorsal colitis. NSAIDs may also be illegal in competition, so it may be necessary to stop treatment with NSAIDs several days before the horse competes.

Corticosteroid injections into the lower hock joints may resolve the lameness of the horse for several weeks or months. Again, it is important to check association rules to see if corticosteroids are not allowed in competition, so that they may be discontinued before the horse competes.

Orthobiologics such as PRP, autologous conditioned serum, or autologous protein solution often have similar effects but without the side effects of corticosteroids.

Tiludronic acid, a bisphosphonate, tradenames Tildren and Equidronate (UK) has been beneficial in the treatment of some cases of bone spavin. It is administered by slow infusion (30 mn) mixed with saline.

Other joint medications, like hyaluronic acid and Adequan, may help alleviate the pain if the horse has mild bone spavin. However, they are less useful for treating moderate of severe cases.

Nutritional supplements containing MSM, glucosamine, and other ingredients may also help horses with moderate bone spavin.

=== Shoeing ===
Proper shoeing is critical in the management of a horse with bone spavin. Shoes most helpful for these horses include shoes that assist in breakover (like a square or rolled toe, or shoes with wedge pads). Shoes with heel support may also help horses with bone spavin, such as egg bar shoes. A set toe can be applied to protect the toe from increased wear, as lack of flexion in the hock will cause the horse to drag its toe. A trailer or lateral extension can be fitted to prevent an axial swing developed by the horse, allowing the horse to make contact with the ground earlier and prevent rotation within the hock. Each case of bone spavin should be shod independently depending on the severity of the case and the horses needs, there is not a specific shoe to be applied.

=== Exercise and work ===
It is best for a horse with bone spavin to be exercised daily. Preferably, this should be ridden or driven work, as round pen or longeing exercise places uneven stress on the joint. Pasture turnout may not be beneficial if the horse does not move much.

It is best to decrease the intensity of the workload for a horse with bone spavin. However, even with careful management, bone spavin will progressively get worse, and the animal may not be able to continue at the level of competition it was first used for once the lameness is consistent. Many horses can still be successful in a less-strenuous career. Light exercise is better than no exercise at all, and a change of career may prolong the horse's useful life.

=== Surgery ===
Fusion of the affected joint may end the lameness, as the joint has then become stable. However, this may take several years, or never occur. In these cases, surgery may be an option.

In a facilitated ankylosis procedure, some of the joint cartilage is destroyed with a drill bit or a laser, and the holes are sometimes filled with bone grafts.

Alternatively, the veterinarian may also inject a caustic agent into the joint to destroy the cartilage, as opposed to drilling the joint. After the procedure, the horse will be lame for weeks or months, until the joint has fused.

Exercise can help accelerate the fusion of the bones, so the horse may be hand-walked after the injection. NSAIDs are usually given to ease the pain.

A cunean tenectomy can be performed with good success in some cases. The cunean tendon runs diagonally across the inside of the joint. When there is excessive bone here, it is thought that this can cause irritation on the tendon and its associated bursa. In this procedure, a section of the tendon is removed,

== Prognosis ==
The prognosis for bone spavin varies, depending on several factors including:

- the number of joints involved
- the severity of the bony changes within these joints
- how quickly the horse's condition is worsening
- what the horse is used for

Most horses cannot continue at a high level of competition for long. However, many horses can continue happily for use as a trail or pleasure horse, or for light work.
