= Cow-hocked =

Defect in the conformation of four-legged animals

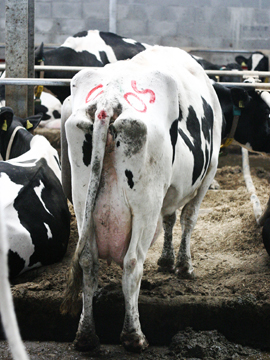
A cow-hocked cow

Cow-hocked (adj.) or cow hocks (n.) describes a defect in the conformation of four-legged animals, primarily of livestock and horses, but also of dogs and cats.

== Description ==
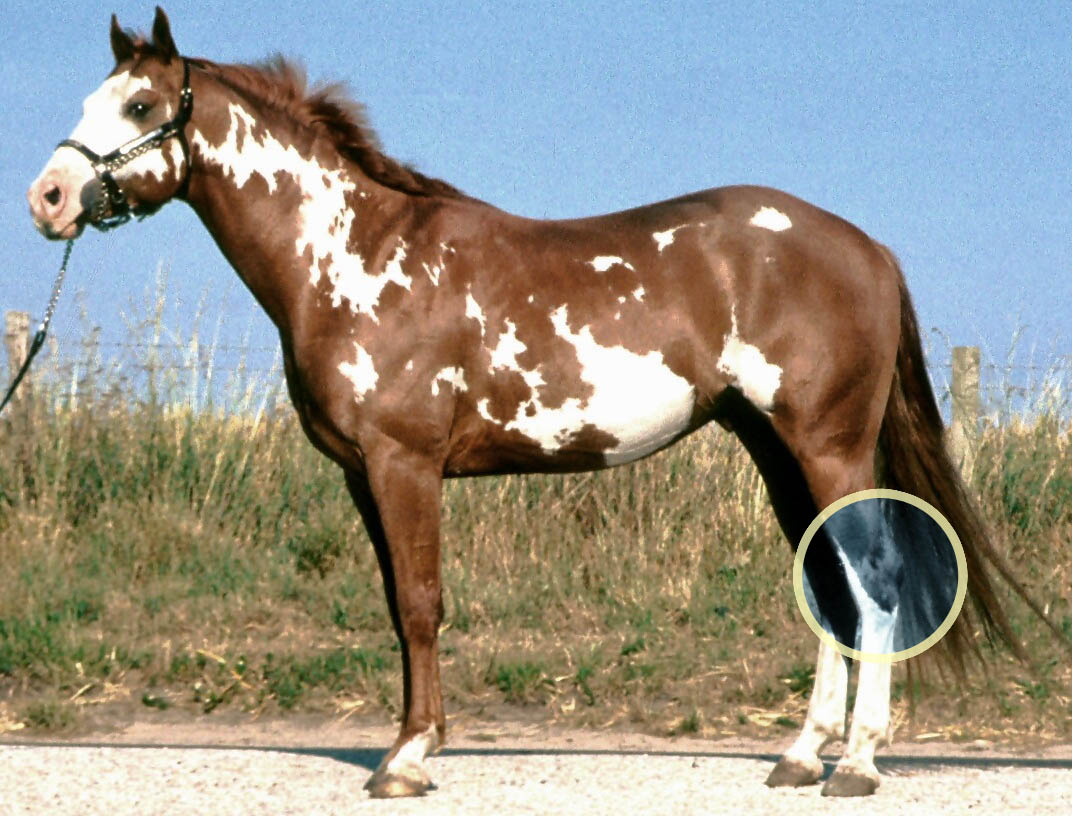
Location of the hock

An animal is cow-hocked when its hock is set inward, resulting in a splayed look in the back legs. This can result in the uneven wearing of hooves, which can end up in permanent lameness, and can prove to be a very serious condition. Permanent lameness usually results in the animal going for meat, as the cow will be in far too much pain to move, the milk in a cow will not be up to standard, and the animal could not be used in breeding, as this trait would pass on. However, most animals will not have too serious a condition, and will walk with a splayed-leg look. Another way of spotting cow-hock is when the hooves point outward as a result of the incorrect lineup of the joints in the leg.

Another problem with cow-hocks is when the joints in the leg are not set correctly, the joints in the back will most likely be set incorrectly as well. The animal will not do well in agricultural shows, will be in a lot of pain, and for both of these reasons, it is advised to take the animal out of any breeding programs.

== Effects ==
In cow-hocked horses, the hind hocks are too close together and point toward each other, with the feet too widely apart. It is a fairly common defect, and if the metatarsal bones are vertical, may not always cause lameness. A combination of cow- and sickle-hocks poses a greater risk.

Cats are commonly cow-hocked, with the hind legs angling inward at the ankles and the feet splaying outward more than forward. Mild cow-hocking is negligible, and kittens often look a little cow-hocked, but if the defect is severe, the resulting poor alignment can damage the joints and spine. A similar deviation may occur in the vertical alignment of a dog's rear structure.

== See also ==
- Bow-legged
- Knock-kneed
- Post-legged
