= Tibiotarsal joint =

Joint between the tibia and the tarsus

In the anatomy of humans and many other mammals, the tibiotarsal joint is the joint between the tibia and the tarsus.

In avian anatomy, it is the equivalent of the ankle.

In equine veterinary science, synovial distension of the tibiotarsal joint in the horse is known as bog spavin.
