= Bog spavin =

Veterinary condition in horses

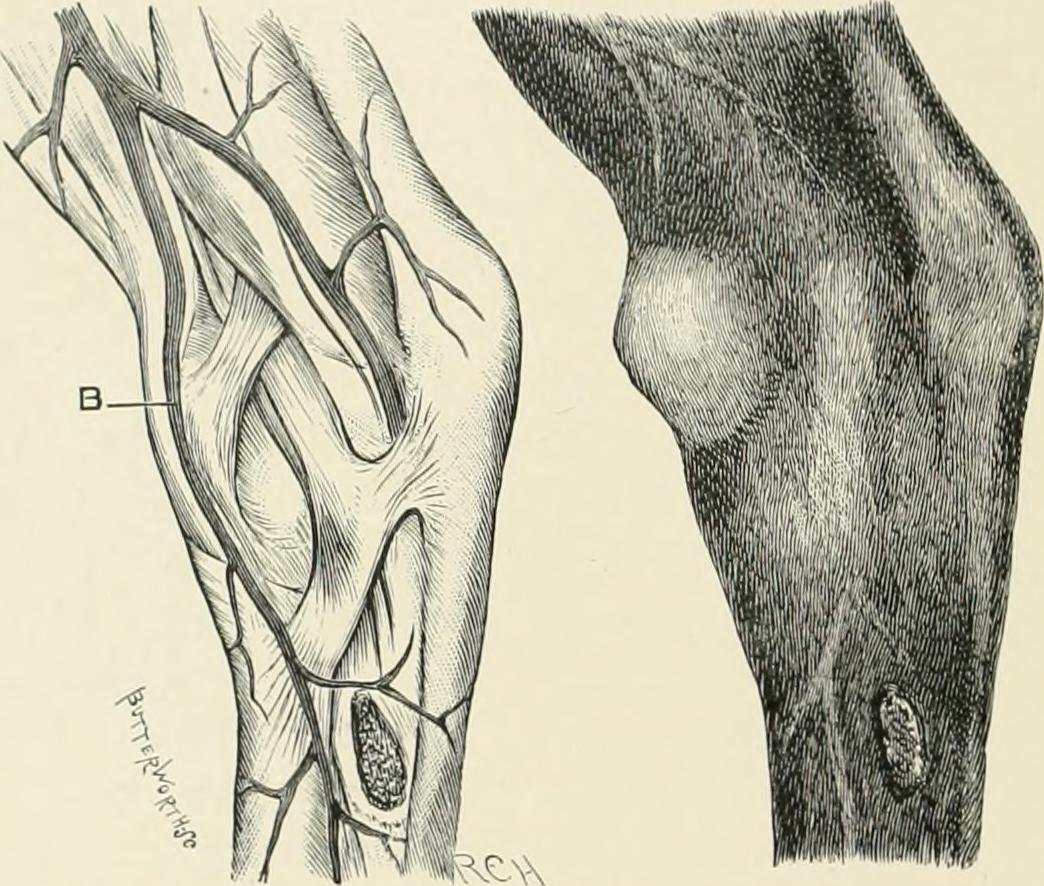
Bog spavin, identified by B on the drawing with the skin removed.

Bog spavin is a swelling of the tibiotarsal joint of the horse's hock which, in itself, does not cause lameness. The joint becomes distended by excess synovial fluid and/or thickened synovial tissue bringing about a soft, fluctuant swelling on the front of the joint, as well as in the medial and lateral plantar pouches. Bog spavin is generally an indication of underlying pathology within the joint.

== Causes ==
Bog spavin is a physical finding, not a specific diagnosis, and does not directly create lameness. Causes include synovitis (inflammation of the lining of the joint capsule), degenerative joint disease, or excessive strain of the joint capsule. In horses younger than the age of three, most cases of bog spavin are caused by osteochondritis dissecans lesions, while in mature horses it is often caused by strain of the joint capsule. Severe bone spavin which involves the proximal intertarsal joint may also cause bog spavin. Infection of the joint causes a severe synovitis, and should be treated as an emergency.

While many horses with bog spavin will not be lame, it can be a sign that the horse has joint disease, which is a very significant finding. Bog spavin should not be treated lightly, and it is best to have a veterinarian examine the horse to find the cause, even if the horse does not appear lame.

Unlike bone spavin, most cases of bog spavin do not have bony remodeling. For this reason it is considered to be of no interest to those studying animal paleopathology (Baker and Brothwell, 1980).

== Management ==
A veterinarian will usually radiograph the hocks of the horse to check for bony changes as it is important to address the underlying cause of the joint distension. It's important to have a veterinarian perform an equine prepurchase exam to identify an existing condition such as a bog spavin. If the bog spavin is drained then it will simply refill unless the underlying cause has healed or been treated. In many cases it may be difficult to achieve resolution of the distension. Treatment may involve injection of corticosteroids or hyaluronan into the joint and some cases may require arthroscopic surgery. Rest or controlled exercise is often indicated.

== Sources ==
- Baker, J, and Brothwell, D. 1980. Animal Diseases in Archaeology. London: Academic Press.
- King, Christine, and Mansmann, Richard. 1997. Equine Lameness. Equine Research, Inc. pp. 835–836.
