= Baastrup =

Baastrup may refer to:

- Anne Baastrup (born 1952), Danish politician
- Christian Ingerslev Baastrup (1855–1950), Danish radiologist
- Baastrup's sign, a disorder of the lumbar spine

== See also ==
- Bastrop (disambiguation)
