= Treatment of equine lameness =

The treatment of equine lameness is a complex subject. Lameness in horses has a variety of causes, and treatment must be tailored to the type and degree of injury, as well as the financial capabilities of the owner. Treatment may be applied locally, systemically, or intralesionally, and the strategy for treatment may change as healing progresses. The end goal is to reduce the pain and inflammation associated with injury, to encourage the injured tissue to heal with normal structure and function, and to ultimately return the horse to the highest possible post-recovery performance.

== The process of healing ==
=== Bone ===
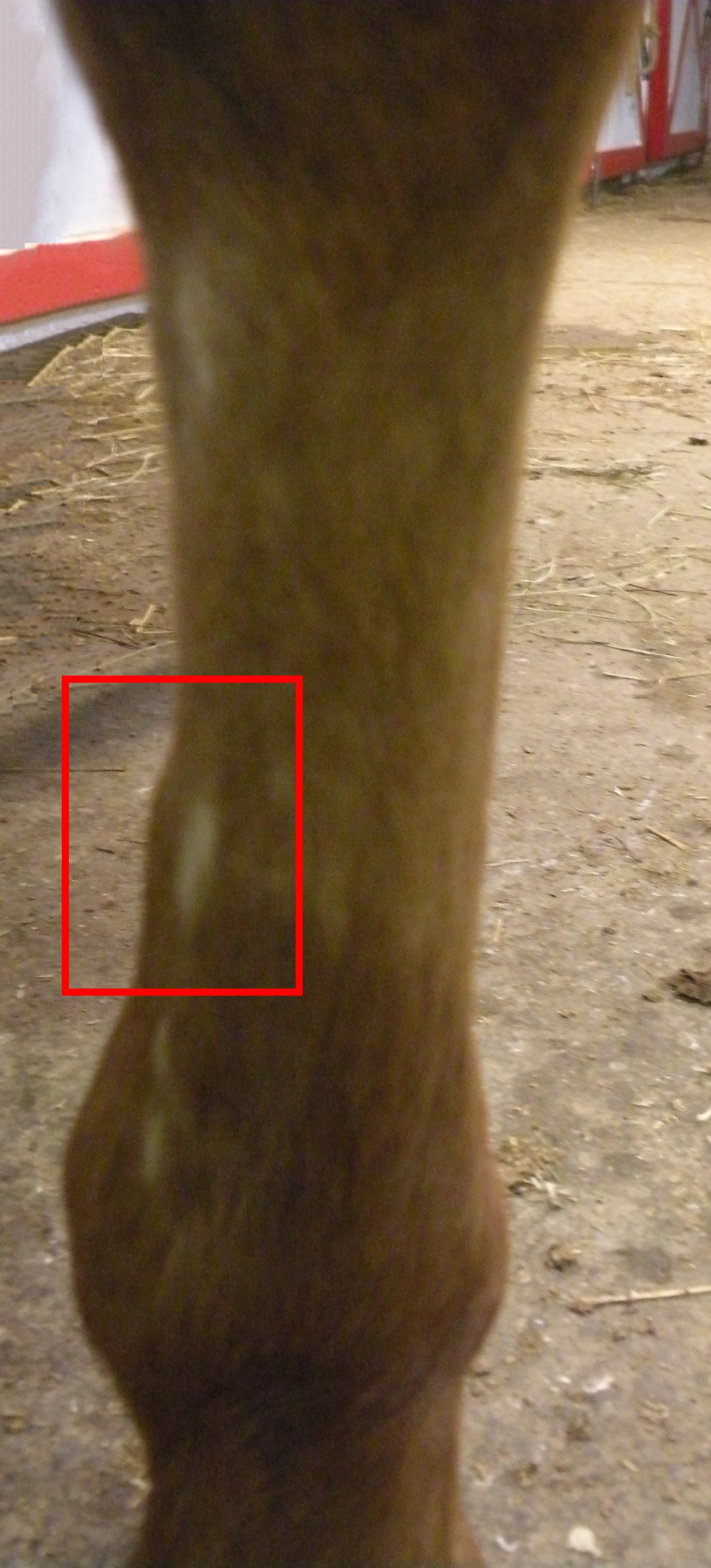
The callus formed due to splint bone injury can become large and put pressure on the suspensory ligament.

Bone heals by formation of a callus over the defective area. Speed and quality of healing is directly related to the blood supply and fracture stability. Rest is required immediately following injury to reduce movement of the fracture site. Stability may be improved through use of surgical implants or casting, depending on the location of extent of the fracture. Shock wave therapy is sometimes employed in the case of splint bone fracture or stress fractures to the cannon bones, to improve blood flow to the area. Fractures within a joint, such as chip fractures in the knee, hock, or fetlock, require arthroscopic surgery to prevent secondary arthritis of that joint.

In some cases, the callus may place pressure on surrounding soft tissue structures. The callus of a splint bone fracture can push on the adjacent suspensory ligament, leading to lameness from secondary suspensory desmitis. Treatment usually involves the removal of the offending callus.

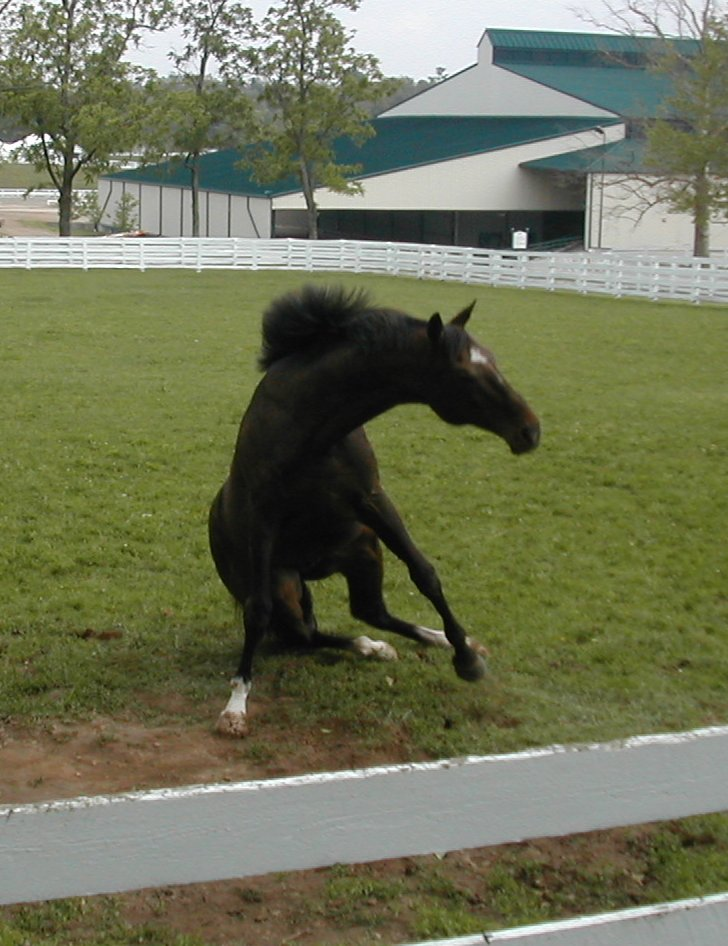
The act of standing can place considerable strain on a fracture site.

On average, bone heals better than soft tissue. It requires less time to heal and, unlike soft tissue which is always weaker after healing, bone heals to 100% strength. However, fracture healing in horses is complicated by their size, flightiness, and desire to stand. Horses are at risk of re-injury of the fracture site, especially when trying to rise after lying down, or when recovering from anesthesia following fracture repair. Forced recumbency is not an option for horses, making healing more difficult. Weight bearing on a single front or hind limb increases the likelihood of support limb laminitis. Additionally, the cost of casting or surgical fixation makes treatment financially unattainable for some owners. While limb fractures are no longer a death-sentence for horses, it is still considered a very serious injury. In general, a horse is more likely to survive if it is small in stature and has a good temperament that will tolerate the months of inactivity required for healing. Fractures that are open, comminuted (very fragmented), or located higher on the limb tend to have a poorer prognosis.

=== Synovial joints ===
Lameness is most commonly associated with injury to synovial joints, or those joints containing articular cartilage, a joint capsule, and a synovial membrane. Joint disease may affect the joint capsule and synovial membrane, articular cartilage, subchondral bone (the bone underneath the cartilage), menisci, or any ligaments associated with the joint. Damage to any of these tissues leads to inflammation, which is especially problematic in the joint. While degeneration of articular cartilage is a common disease process in working animals, resulting in osteoarthritis, cartilage is aneural (does not contain nerves) and does not produce pain. Pain associated with osteoarthritis is secondary to joint capsule pain, due to joint distention and reduced range of motion, or to pain from the underlying bone, which may become damaged following erosion of the articular cartilage.

Inflammatory products, such as inflammatory mediators and cytokines, damage articular cartilage and have been shown to weaken intra-articular ligaments. Therefore, treatment of joint disease should not only address the primary injury producing inflammation, but also the inflammatory cycle that leads to further tissue damage. Cryotherapy, joint lavage, systemic anti-inflammatories, or intra-articular medications are used to reduce joint inflammation. In the case of severe joint pathology such as an osteochondral chip, intra-articular fracture, osteochondritis dissecans lesion, or ligamentous or meniscal injury, arthroscopy may be required to ensure normal function of that joint. Debris within the joint, such as from a chip fracture, can cause long term damage to the synovium and articular cartilage leading to osteoarthritis, and is therefore best removed. Following acute injury, joints often benefit from specialized physical therapy, such as swimming, to prevent the loss of range of motion associated with joint capsule fibrosis.

Treatment of joint cartilage injury is difficult and often unrewarding. Partial-thickness defects do not heal. The body will try to repair full-thickness cartilage defects using scar tissue or fibrocartilage, both of which are poor substitutes for normal, healthy articular cartilage. Current treatment includes arthroscopy-produced microfratures within the subchondral plate. These microfractures encourage an inflammatory response within the defect, which recruits stem cells to the area. Unfortunately, these cells differentiate into fibrocartilage, rather than normal joint (hyaline) cartilage, leading to inferior tissue repair at the site of injury. Bone marrow aspirate concentrate (BMAC) has shown some benefits when grafted into the area following microtrauma. However, the primary treatment for degenerative joint disease involves reducing the inflammatory process that is known to accelerate articular cartilage degeneration.

=== Tendon and ligament ===
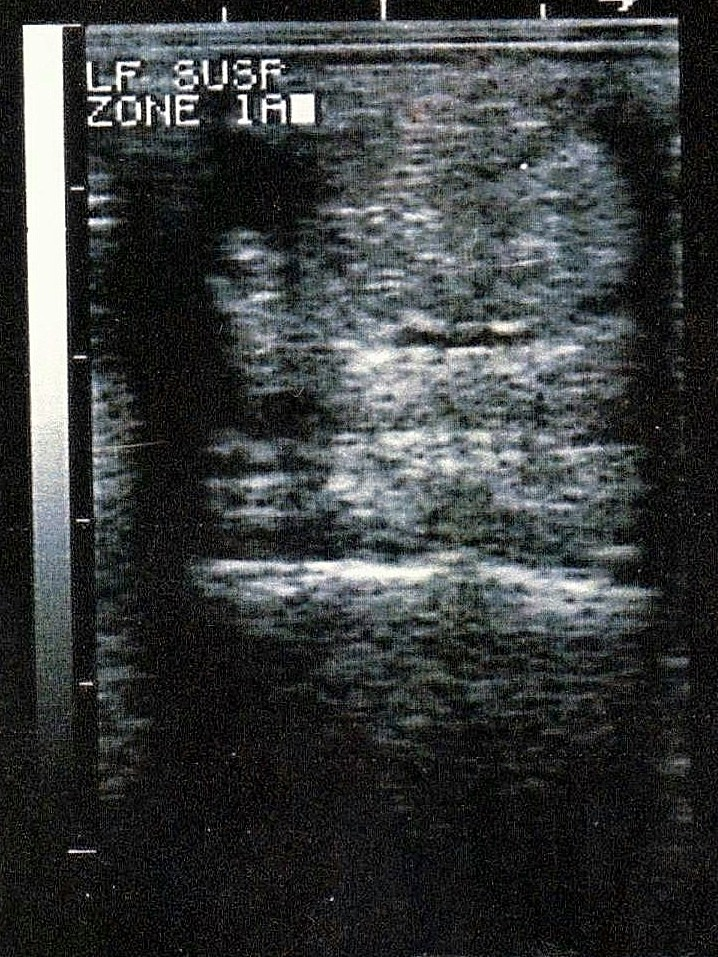
Healing of soft tissue injury is often monitored with ultrasound.

Tendon is primarily composed of elastic type I collagen. However, mature tendon contains cells that have a limited ability to regenerate. Following injury, tendon lays down type III collagen, or scar tissue, which is stronger than type I collagen but stiffer and less-elastic. This makes it less distensible and more likely to re-injure when the horse begins to stretch the tendon during strenuous work. Certain treatments may improve the final tendon fiber quality, and subsequently increase the likelihood that the horse will return to full performance post-injury.

Healing of soft tissue injury is often monitored using ultrasound to assess the lesion size and fiber pattern. Monitoring soft tissue injury with ultrasound allows for a more scientific determination of when to introduce exercise back into the horse's rehabilitation program, and for quick intervention should the injury worsen. Recently, a new ultrasound technique called color Doppler ultrasonography has been used to assess equine tendon injuries. Color Doppler measures the degree of blood flow to a lesion, allowing for more accurate assessment of healing.

== Rest and hand-walking ==
Rest is almost always recommended for treatment of lameness because it reduces forces placed on damaged tissue, allowing the normal process of healing to occur. Type and severity of injury determines the duration and degree of rest required. Aggressive limitations of activity may be required in cases of fracture. Horses are kept tied for the several-month duration of healing, to prevent them from lying down and potentially re-injuring the bone while trying to stand. In other cases, rest may be contraindicated. Animals with a history of upward fixation of the patella, polysaccharide storage myopathy, and equine recurrent rhabdomyolysis are often best kept on a schedule of regular exercise. Rest may be counterproductive if the lameness is secondary to osteoarthritis. In this case, mild exercise improves joint mobility and lameness can worsen with confinement. Rest may vary from strict confinement (“stall rest”), to small paddock or pasture turnout, to reduction of exercise intensity. Horses are often unpredictable when on prolonged stall rest, which greatly increases the risk of re-injury when hand-walking is begun. Sedation or additional forms of restraint may be needed to help control the horse during this initial period of increased exercise intensity. While rest may be implemented as the only form of treatment, specialized treatment often improves overall recovery, and is recommended if the client desires the animal to return to full athletic function.

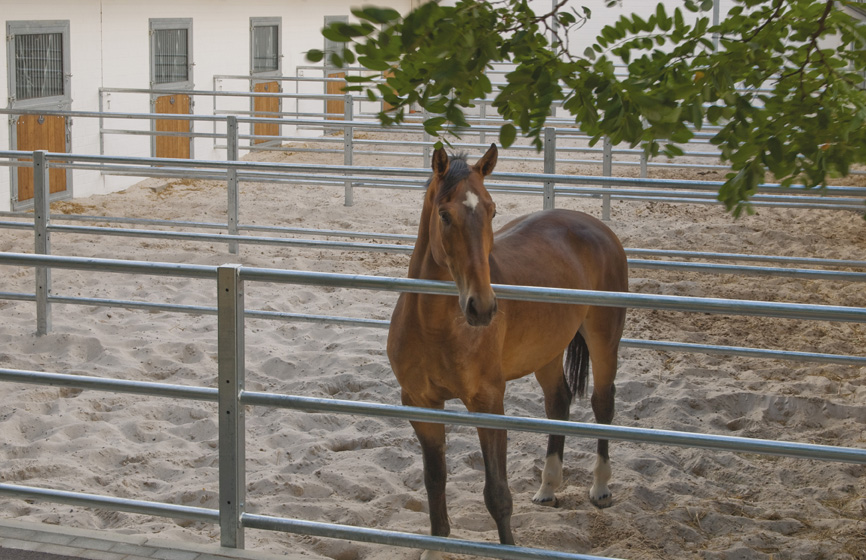
Horses are often confined to small paddocks to help reduce movement.

Soft tissue and bone strengthen with exercise and weaken if it is not actively used. Horses that undergo long-term stall rest require a slow, progressive rehabilitation program to try to prevent re-injury of the original tissue or injury to a new area now weakened by prolonged disuse. In some cases of soft tissue injury, low-impact exercise, such as hand walking or walking under tack, can be more beneficial if introduced in the early healing phase rather than adhering to strict stall rest alone. Tendons and ligaments heal by formation of scar tissue, which is less elastic and lacks the very regular, organized pattern of fibrils of normal tissue. Exercise helps to encourage proper fiber alignment, and subsequently leads to a tissue that is closer to its original elasticity.

In cases of acute injury, joints benefit from rest to allow for reduction of the inflammatory process within the joint. Hand walking is often recommended during times of stall rest to help prevent adhesion formation and fibrosis within the damaged joint, to maintain range of motion, and prevent atrophy of the articular cartilage. Hand walking is used in cases of cellulitis to reduce edema formation in the tissues. Cellulitis leads to an extreme degree of swelling, which can persist after elimination of the underlying cause and result in long-term lameness. Therefore, reduction of edema is a very important part of treatment, and walking is often performed multiple times each day.

== Cryotherapy, thermotherapy, and compression ==
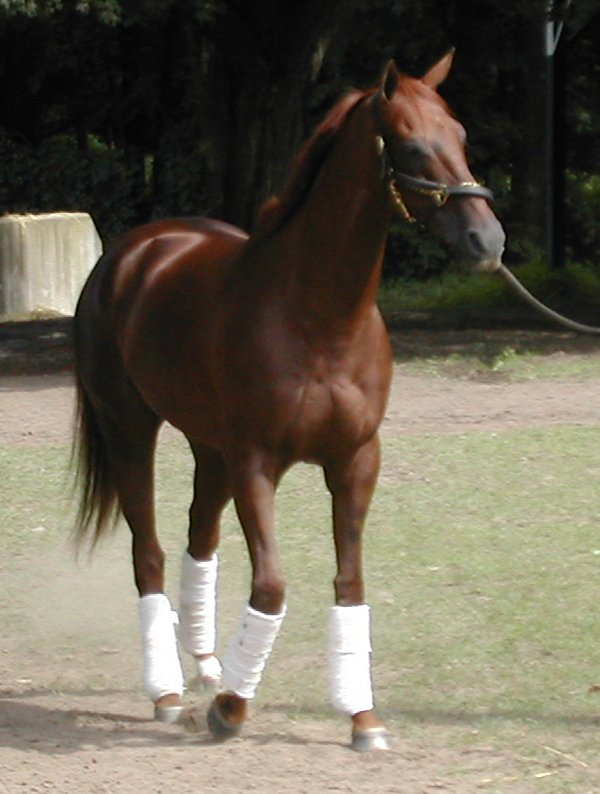
Bandaging is often used to apply compression to the lower legs.

Cold application to the skin (cryotherapy) is used to decrease pain and inflammation of acute soft tissue injuries. At a cellular level, cold application decreases the formation of exudate and diapedesis of inflammatory cells, thereby reducing edema. Cryotherapy has also been shown to reduce metabolism and thus oxygen demand of tissues, helping to prevent hypoxic tissue damage. Cold is often applied to the site of injury by hosing cold water onto the area (hydrotherapy), icing, or medical devices such as the Game Ready system that provides both cold therapy and compression. Cold salt-water spas are also available, and are used to bathe a patient's injury in aerated, hypertonic, cold water. This combines the benefits of cryotherapy with the osmotic effect of salt, producing better analgesia and reduction of inflammation.

Heat (thermotherapy) is usually applied at least 48–72 hours after the initial injury. It is used to improve blood flow and subsequently healing, and to increase extensibility of tissues. Improved blood flow can also encourage fluid reabsorption, which reduces swelling, and encourages phagocytic cells to enter the site of the injury. Liniments are sometimes used to increase heat to an area. Both heat and cold have been shown to decrease muscle spasm and pain.

Often compression is used concurrently in the form of pressure wraps, to reduce edema and swelling. Pressure wraps are usually used as long as inflammation is active. Bandaging is especially important in cases of severe swelling, such as cellulitis, which can cause continued lameness if the edema persists after the initial cause has been successfully treated. Bandaging may also be helpful in reducing pain, by stimulating mechanoreceptors. Bandaging is often used to keep wounds clean, but has been shown to increase the risk of exuberant granulation tissue (“proud flesh”) formation. Casting may be used to completely immobilize a joint, which is important in the case of destabilizing injury, but increases the risk of adhesion formation within a joint, and muscle and joint cartilage atrophy. In the case of joint pain secondary to capsulitis or synovitis, which are not destabilizing, complete immobilization of the joint should be avoided.

== Joint supplements ==
Various neutraceuticals (supplements) are available for equine joint health. Although these products are evaluated for safety, they are not required to prove efficacy, and actual scientific support of their benefits for osteoarthritis in horses are poor. This includes studies on supplements containing glucosamine, chondroitin sulfate, and methylsulfonylmethane (MSM). Because they are not regulated, joint supplements are not required to contain what has been listed on the label. Additionally, oral joint supplements may have questionable bioavailability. However, these products are still popular, with anecdotal support for their use, and have little downside for use except for cost to the owner.

== Use of NSAIDs ==
Nonsteroidal anti-inflammatory drugs (NSAIDs) are a mainstay of lameness treatment, providing analgesia (pain relief) and reducing inflammation. The term NSAID is used to refer to a specific drug class that inhibits the conversion of arachidonic acid into prostaglandins and thromboxane. Reduction of prostaglandin helps to reduce pain, decrease vasodilation (and subsequent edema formation), and the diminish the effects of inflammatory mediators such as interleukin-1. The most commonly used NSAIDs in the United States is phenylbutazone, although flunixin meglumine and firocoxib are also commonly used for orthopedic pain.

Despite their widespread use, NSAIDs do have the potential to cause severe toxicity, including GI ulceration, renal tubule disease, renal papillary necrosis, and right dorsal colitis. This is seen most commonly when NSAIDs are used long-term, if they are used at a dose that is higher than recommended, or if two different NSAIDs are used in combination (a method known as “stacking”). Stacking has been shown to have no benefit in reducing pain and a much greater chance of producing toxicity. Some NSAIDs can decrease proteoglycan synthesis, especially in cases of cartilage that is already diseased, which can worsen joint disease. However, this side effect does not occur with all drugs in the NSAID class, including phenylbutazone.

Diclofenac is a topical NSAID. It has a clear benefit over traditional NSAIDs in that topical application reduces the amount of drug circulating systemically, and therefore reduces the risk of negative side effects. Diclofenac has been shown to reduce lameness secondary to joint pain in horses.

== Corrective trimming and shoeing ==
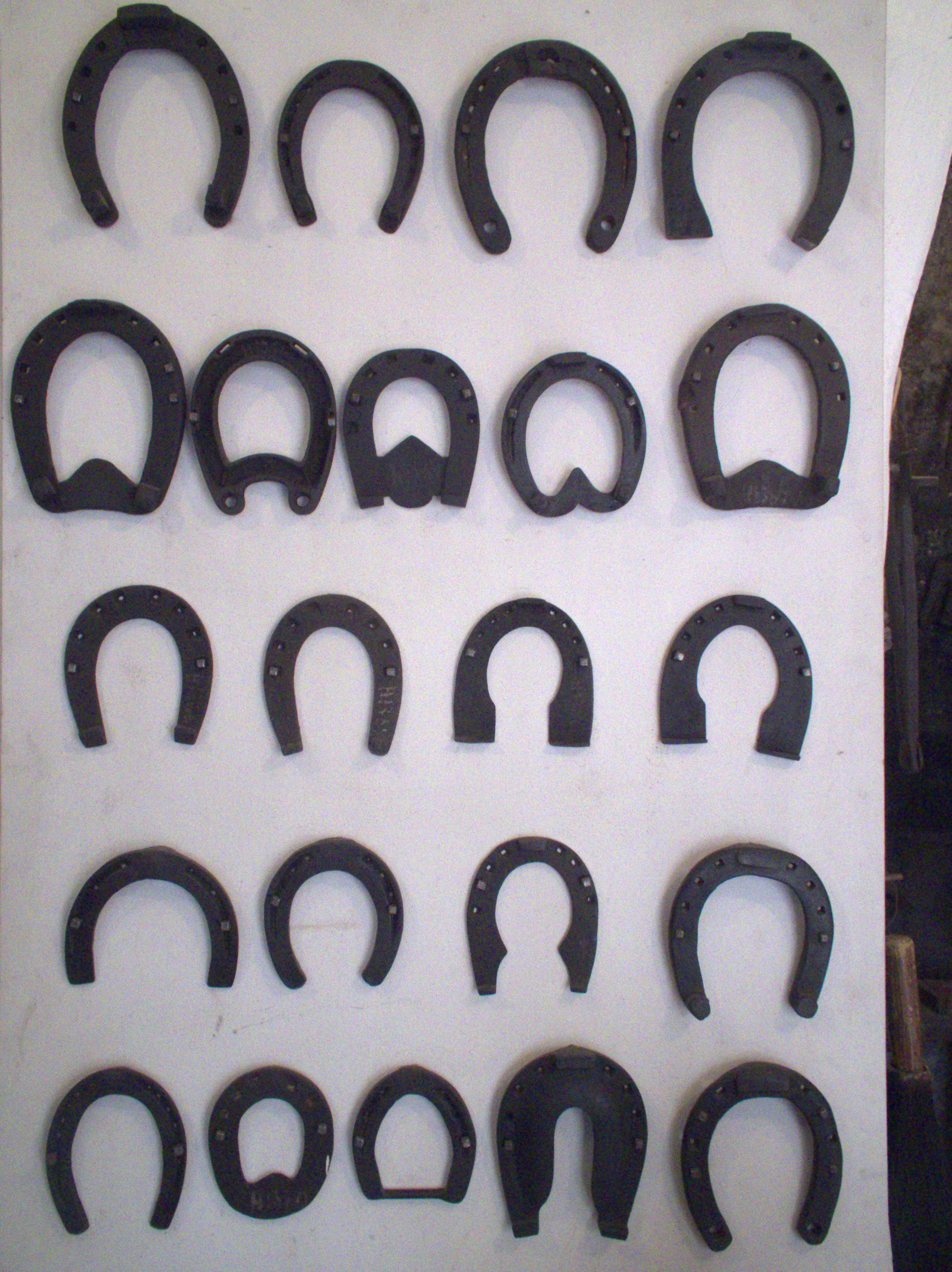
Various types of shoes are available to alter forces placed on the hoof and lower leg.

Corrective trimming and shoeing is used to alter the forces placed on the hoof and soft tissues of the digit and lower leg. The goal is to reduce strain or load on structures that are at-risk of damage secondary to conformation, movement, or past injury, or to treat areas that are healing and can no longer handle normal forces. Evaluation of the horse's conformation, hoof balance, and shoeing is often a first step in treatment of lameness. A correct, balanced trim is a key component of lameness treatment and prevention. Some cases of lameness, such as angular limb deformities and navicular syndrome, are best managed with special trimming and shoeing. In very complex cases, a farrier that focuses on corrective shoeing and trimming may be recommended for the duration of treatment.

Adjustments in trimming or shoeing can be made to help support the hoof, allowing pressure to be distributed over healthy tissue in order reduce the force over damaged or diseased tissue. Application of various types of therapeutic shoes, pads, and wedges, can be used to help alter stress placed on structures within the foot or the lower limb. Hospital plates—special shoes that keep the entire sole clean but can be opened to allow for daily treatment—are sometimes recommended for injuries to the bottom of the hoof such hoof abscesses or canker.

== Systemic injectable joint therapies ==
=== Polysulfated glycosaminoglycans (Adequan) ===
Polysulfated glycosaminoglycans (PSGAGs) are drugs originally labeled for intra-articular use, but are commonly given intramuscularly to horses. They have a chondroprotective effect and are given to try to prevent or slow cartilage destruction in cases of osteoarthritis, and are often used in cases of cartilage damage of a joint. PSGAGs have been shown to have several beneficial effects on the joint: they inhibit enzymes that break down cartilage, inhibit the production of prostaglandin E2, increase glycosaminoglycan production, and may increase hyaluronic acid production.

The degree of these effects in horses after intramuscular injection has relatively little support in the current literature. However, there is much anecdotal evidence of their benefits for synovitis and osteoarthritis, and PSGAGs are very commonly used by veterinarians in the United States involved in racehorse and show horse practice. PSGAG is sold under the trade name Adequan. It is a mix of low-molecular weight glycosaminoglycans made from bovine trachea and lung. It is labeled to be used every 4 days, for a total of 7 doses.

=== Hyaluronic acid ===
Intravenous formulations of hyaluronic acid (HA) are available under the trade names Legend and Hyonate. In osteochondral fragmentation models, intravenous HA has been shown to decrease lameness, improve the synovial membrane, and lower protein and prostaglandin E2 levels within joints. Additionally, it was shown to have positive effects on racing Quarter Horses, leading to a greater number of starts, a longer career, and more money earned, but these horses were also treated with IA corticosteroids at an earlier point of their career, potentially confounding the results. Another study in Thoroughbreds found no improvement when using IV hyaluronic acid. However, there is much anecdotal support from trainers of different disciplines, and it remains a popular therapy.

=== Polyglycan ===
Polyglycan is a combination of sodium hyaluronate, sodium chondroitin sulfate, and N-acetyl-D-glucosamine. It is labeled as a medical device, to be used for joint lavage following surgery, but is used by some equine practitioners off-label, given IV or IM.

=== Pentosan polysulfate ===
Pentosan polysulfate, like Adequan, has been shown to improve signs of osteoarthritis. In non-equine models, Pentosan has been shown to increase proteoglycan synthesis, stimulate hyaluronic acid production in osteoarthritic joints (a benefit not shared by PSGAGs), reduce inflammatory cytokines, and improve damaged articular cartilage. Pentosan is made from hemicellulose of beechwood, and has been shown to improve joint function in sheep models, and improve cartilage in horses. Anecdotal evidence suggests that it can lead to a significant improvement of lameness in racehorses.

== Intrasynovial therapy (joint injections) and joint lavage ==
=== Corticosteroids ===
Intra-articular (IA) corticosteroids are potent anti-inflammatories. They stabilize lysosomal membranes, inhibit inflammatory cell movement and reduce their function, and subsequently decrease the level of inflammatory mediators within the joint. Additionally, hyaluronic acid levels in synovial fluid have been found to increase following IA injection of corticosteroids. The most commonly used intra-articular steroids used in the United States are methylprednisolone acetate, triamcinolone acetonide, and betamethasone esters.

Corticosteroids have been implicated as damaging to joints if used repeatedly, although research has shown these results to be drug-specific. Methylprednisolone appears to be most associated with these negative effects, and can lead to decreased proteoglycan synthesis, decreased synovial vascularity, and damage to articular cartilage. Proteoglycans within the joint are depleted, especially in younger animals, even when the steroid is used concomitantly with chondroprotective drugs such as PSGAGs. Betamethasone administration has not been shown to have detrimental effects on articular cartilage. Triamcinolone acetonide is potentially chondroprotective, producing more proteoglycan, decreasing synovial protein and inflammatory cell levels, and improving cartilage. Because of its potentially chondroprotective effects, triamcinolone is usually chosen to treat high-motion joints. Some practitioners chose to use methylprednisone to treat low-motion joints, especially of the distal hock, for the sole purpose of destroying the cartilage and reducing the time to natural ankylosis. However, there is no evidence to support the use of methylprednisolone to produce joint fusion of the hock.

Additionally, there is concern of inducing laminitis in horses treated with IA triamcinolone. It has been shown that up to 18 mg of triamcinolone can be used safely. Horses are at increased risk of laminitis if they have pituitary pars intermedia dysfunction, but in general the benefits of corticosteroid use outweigh the risks.

=== Hyaluronic acid ===
Hyaluronic acid (hyaluronan, HA) is naturally occurring component of synovial fluid and the extracellular matrix of articular cartilage. It is produced by the synovial membrane and makes the synovial fluid viscous, lubricates the joint, and affects compressibility of articular cartilage. It may also have some effect on the solute content and white blood cell concentration within the joint fluid.

HA is commonly injected intra-articular (IA) into diseased joints, but its exact mechanism of action is unknown. HA concentration and molecular weight are sometimes lower in diseased joints, but this is not always the case. Exogenously administered HA has a half-life of 96 hours in normal joints but is shorter in diseased joints. It is hypothesized that a portion of HA localizes in the joint and increases metabolism of synoviocytes. High molecular weight HA has been shown to offer better protection of articular cartilage than low molecular weight, and longer duration of soundness in horses with arthritis.

=== Polysulfated glycosaminoglycans (PSGAGs) ===
Intra-articular use of PSGAGs has been shown to improve lameness, signs of arthritis, joint effusion, and synovial fluid quality. However, mixed results have been reported on its ability to actually repair cartilaginous defects present at time of injection. IA use of PSGAGs may have an increased risk of Staphylococcus aureus infections within the joint when compared to intra-articular injections of other substances, although this can be prevented by concurrently injecting aminoglycoside antibiotics.

=== Anesthetics ===
Intra-articular anesthetics are most often used to block the joint or surrounding structures for lameness evaluation. Use of local anesthetics for long-term pain relief is impractical, due to their short duration.

=== Joint lavage ===
Joint lavage involves placing two large bore needles into a diseased joint and flushing it with sterile saline. Lavage helps to remove inflammatory mediators, which is common in cases of synovitis, as well as any damaging debris such as articular cartilage. This procedure may be performed standing, but a more thorough lavage using a greater volume of saline may be used when performed under general anesthesia. Joint lavage is a regular component of arthroscopic surgery. It is especially helpful in patients with severe lameness secondary to acute synovitis.

== Other Medications ==
=== Bisphosphonates ===
Tiludronate disodium (Tildren) and Clodronate disodium (Osphos) are FDA-approved bisphosphonates used to reduce bone reabsorption by inhibiting osteoclasts. They are most commonly used for the treatment of navicular disease and osteoarthritic conditions such as bone spavin. Tildren is given intravenously, either systemically injected into the jugular vein, or locally through use of regional limb perfusion. Osphos is given intramuscularly, divided into 3 different injection sites. Both drugs were approved for use in the United States in 2014.

=== Vasodilators ===
Isoxsuprine and pentoxifylline are two commonly used vasodilators in equine medicine. Isoxsuprine has been shown to have vasodilatory and red blood cell deformability properties. Pentoxifylline has been shown to decrease blood viscosity, reduce platelet aggregation, and increase red blood cell deformability. These properties are thought to improve blood flow to the digit, and makes them popular drugs for treatment of navicular disease and laminitis. However, some studies have shown oral isoxsuprine and pentoxifylline to have little to no effect on digital blood flow. The lack of efficacy of isoxsuprine may be partially due to its poor oral bioavailability (2.2%) and high first pass effect. While pentoxyfylline has a better bioavailability after oral dosing, its absorption may decrease with repeated administration. Pentoxyfilline has been shown to reduce lameness in horses with experimentally induced laminitis and has inhibitory effects on matrix metalloproteinases (MMP), so it may be beneficial for laminitis treatment despite its uncertain effects on digital blood flow.

=== Methocarbamol ===
Methocarbamol, sold under the trade name Robaxin, is a muscle relaxant commonly used in horses to treat muscle pain secondary to spasticity, tetanus, or tying-up. Both oral and injectable forms are on the market. Its use is regulated by many equine competitive governing bodies, since it is thought to have a CNS depressant effect and produces the metabolite guaifenesin, which is a pre-anesthetic veterinary drug. Guaifenesin has been found in the plasma of horses receiving oral, but not intravenous, methocarbamol, likely due to the high first-pass effect of the drug.

=== Tetracyclines ===
The tetracyclines are a class of antibiotic with anti-inflammatory properties. They have various applications for use in treating equine lameness. As expected, tetracycline antibiotics are used to treat infectious causes of lameness if the infectious organism is sensitive to that antibiotic. Tetracycline is the first choice for treating Borrelia burgdorferi, the causative agent of Lyme disease. Additionally, tetracyclines have been shown to have anti-matrix metalloproteinase (MMP) activity. Due to the possible connection between MMPs and laminitis, tetracyclines are sometimes given to prevent or treat laminitis associated with endotoxemia.

High doses of tetracyclines, much greater than used to treat bacterial infections, are used intravenously in foals to treat flexural limb deformities. The most commonly used tetracycline is oxytetracycline, and it is most effective when given to the foal when very young. The mechanism of action is unknown.

=== Gabapentin ===
Gabapentin, sold under the trade name Neurontin, is used to treat neuropathic pain in horses. It may be given orally or intravenously, although oral bioavailability is fairly poor (~16%), and it can produce sedation and increased drinking. Gabapentin has been used for femoral neuropathy following surgery, laminitis, and headshaking in horses.

=== DMSO ===
Dimethyl sulfoxide (DMSO) is a chemical solvent. It is used topically to reduce inflammation associated with an acute injury—primarily by reducing edema—or it may mixed with other substances to improve their absorption through the skin. DMSO triples the skin penetration ability of corticosteroids. DMSO has also been shown to decrease free radical formation, increase blood flow to an area, and is bacteriostatic.

DMSO is especially beneficial in the treatment of joint inflammation, since it has a primary anti-inflammatory effect and can increase the effects of hydrocortisone 10-fold when mixed together. Generally, medical-grade DMSO should be used, and applied while wearing gloves.

== Regenerative medicine ==
Regenerative medicine uses the horse's own cells or proteins to improve healing.

=== Stem cells ===
Stem cells are capable of both self-renewal and of differentiating into cells of different tissue types, making them exciting possibilities for treating injuries through tissue regeneration. Mesenchymal stem cells (MSC) are currently used in horses. The gold-standard source for stem cells is derived from bone marrow, although other sources, such as fat, are also available.

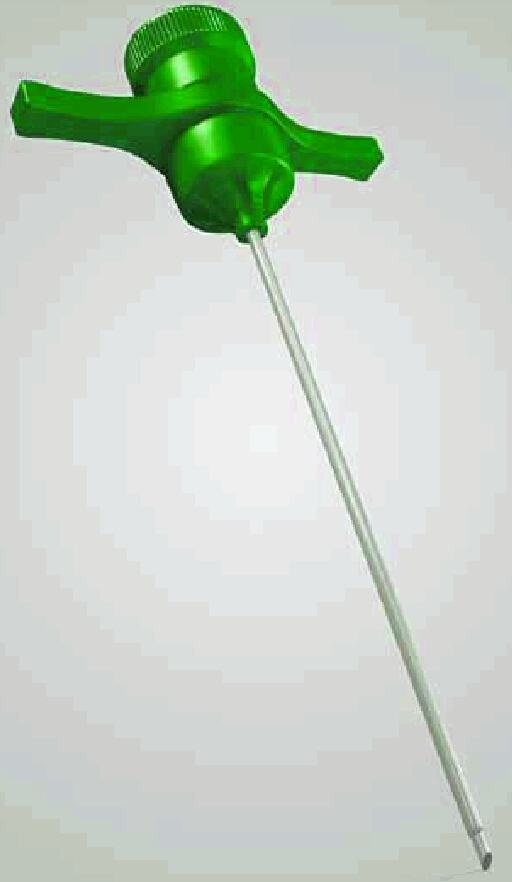
A Jamshidi needle used to collect bone marrow.

Bone marrow is often harvested from the sternum, ischium, or ileum. The sternum and ileum contain the same quality of stem cells, but the ileum is usually harder to use in horses older than 5 years of age, because the marrow cavity shrinks. Marrow is collected using a Jamshidi needle in a sedated horse. Unlike people, horses usually tolerate the procedure well, with little pain. This sample is cultured by a lab over the course of a few weeks before being shipped back to the horse, and then injected into the site of injury.

Adipose-derived MSC are harvested from fat from the abdomen, chest, or tail head. Unlike bone marrow-derived cells, adipose-derived cells are not cultured and expanded, but rather are processed by digesting the fat to produce a stromal vascular fraction. This stromal vascular fraction, a population of nucleated cells, contains only 2-4% MSC. There is currently very limited peer-reviewed data on adipose-derived stem cells.

Stem cell therapy is very safe, but is currently expensive, requiring harvesting and processing of the cells. Additionally, autologous stem cells (those harvested from the patient) requires 2–3 weeks to expand the numbers in culture, delaying treatment of an acute injury. Allogenic (non-self) stem cells may be harvested from other horses ahead of time to have banked for immediate treatment of an injury, but there is some concerns of graft-vs-host disease.

Stem cells have been used to treat a variety of injuries in horses. The most research has been performed on stem cells used for treatment of tendon and meniscal injuries. Horses with tendonitis treated with bone marrow derived stem cells had a significantly lower re-injury rate compared to those without treatment. Stem cell treatment in damaged tendons is thought to improve the collagen make-up of the tendon while healing. It has been shown to reduce the presence of Type III collagen, which relatively inelastic and therefore more prone to re-injury, and increase the presence of Type I collagen which is found in normal tendon fibers. Suspensory ligament injuries have also responded favorably to stem cell therapy.

Results using MSC for osteoarthritis, when using joint models, has shown to produce little effect on the treated joint. However, use in joints may be warranted in the case of meniscal injury. In sheep, joints treated with bone marrow derived MSC following damage to a meniscus were shown to have marked regeneration of the meniscus and reduced osteoarthritis. Horses with meniscal damage had a higher percentage return to work following treatment with bone marrow derived MSC, when compared to results from previous studies of horses treated with arthroscopic surgery alone.

Additionally, research on use of stem cells to produce improved healing of laminae in laminitic horses is also underway.

=== Platelet-rich plasma (PRP) ===
Platelets within the blood release growth factors after they are activated. These growth factors lead to new blood vessel formation, inflammatory cell infiltration, and the generation of connective tissue, which should ultimately improve the speed and quality of healing. The goal of platelet-rich plasma (PRP) is to concentrate these growth factors, which may then be injected into a lesion. While PRP does not contain stem cells, it may draw surrounding stem cells to the site of injury. PRP has been used in wounds, tendon and ligament lesions, fractures, bone cysts, and joints to treat osteoarthritis.

To produce PRP, the patient's blood is centrifuged to separate the plasma from the red blood cells. The plasma is then further processed to produce a final product approximately 8 times the concentration found in the blood. This final product can be produced in under an hour, making it possible to treat the lesion immediately. PRP is most efficacious when used in acute lesions within 10 days of original injury. Because PRP contains white blood cells, injection of the product has been associated with inflammation following treatment. The concentration of platelets and white blood cells vary between preparations and the individual patient from whom it is drawn, which can affect the degree of anabolic and catabolic molecule concentrations within the PRP. To counteract the negative effects of white blood cells in the PRP preparation, horses are usually prescribed NSAIDs for 3 days following treatment, and several days of cryotherapy.

=== Interleukin-1 receptor antagonist protein (IRAP) ===
Interleukin-1 (IL-1) is a cytokine that has been shown to produce a signaling cascade that leads to degradation of cartilage, and which is known to be a critical factor in the formation of osteoarthritis. Interleukin 1 receptor antagonist protein (IL-1Ra, or IRAP) inhibits IL-1, and has been shown to reduce the disease process, including improvement in lameness and histological morphology of cartilage and synovium. However, there have been no clinical trials of its efficacy. Because IL-1 targets cartilage, IRAP is ideal for treating joint injury, and is used to treat osteoarthritis, traumatic joint injury, or after surgery. It is not recommended for use in tendon sheaths or bursae, or in joints with damage to the bone, menisci, or ligaments unless these injuries have been treated successfully using arthroscopy.

To produce IRAP, blood is collected into a syringe of chromium sulfate-soaked beads and incubated for 24 hours. During this time, white blood cells within the blood produce anti-inflammatory cytokines, including IRAP. The resulting serum, known as autologous conditioned serum (ACS), is then centrifuged to produce enough ACS for 4-6 doses. The product is injected into the affected joints. This is repeated every 7–10 days for 2-3 treatments. A newer product, known as IRAP II, has been shown to have modestly higher levels of beneficial cytokines, and lower levels of the pro-inflammatory cytokine TNF-α, when compared to the original product IRAP.

=== Bone marrow aspirate concentrate (BMAC) ===
BMAC is a form of centrifuged bone marrow that contains stem cells and platelets. Because it is simply centrifuged, and not cultured, BMAC contains significantly fewer stem cells than cultured bone marrow. Like PRP, the concentrated platelets in BMAC contain growth factors, although at a lower concentration than PRP. BMAC also contains a significant number of white blood cells, although it is primarily lymphocytes rather than the pro-inflammatory neutrophils seen in some PRP formulations. BMAC has the benefit of being quickly available, requiring only 10–20 minutes of centrifugation, allowing immediate treatment of an injury. It is also significantly less expensive when compared to cultured stem cells.

BMAC has been used arthroscopically to graft into full-thickness cartilage defects. Studies have shown these grafts to improve the filling of these defects, and to contain primarily type II collagen, the collagen that composes hyaline cartilage, with improved collagen orientation within the defect. BMAC has also been used for intralesional treatment of tendon and ligament injuries.

An older method of bone marrow aspirate therapy does not include centrifugation. This risks injecting bone into the affected soft tissue structure, which may slow healing, and is rarely used today.

== Extracorporeal shockwave therapy ==
Extracorporeal shockwave therapy (ESWT) is a modality that has uses high-intensity pressure waves to introduce energy into an injured area. ESWT is commonly used for treating orthopedic problems in horses, including tendon and ligament injuries, kissing spine, navicular syndrome, and arthritis. The evidence for these uses is weak. It also appears to reduce pain and as of 2014 became increasingly used along with drugs to manage pain.

The practitioner decides upon the specific strength and number of impulses based on the site of injury and personal experience. There is currently no protocol that has been defined for any injury, and such specifications require further research to make definitive recommendations. In general, smaller injuries require fewer impulses than larger areas, and deeper tissues or harder tissues (such as bone) require impulses with more strength than those that are softer or more superficial. The location of delivery is key when treating injuries.

== Mesotherapy ==
Mesotherapy is the process of injecting medication intradermally, in multiple rows, along either side of the spine. This treatment is most commonly used to treat neck and back pain, and is thought to break the pain cycle associated with chronic pain. Often combinations of corticosteroids, local anesthetics, or sarapin are used.

== Physical therapy ==
=== Passive flexion ===
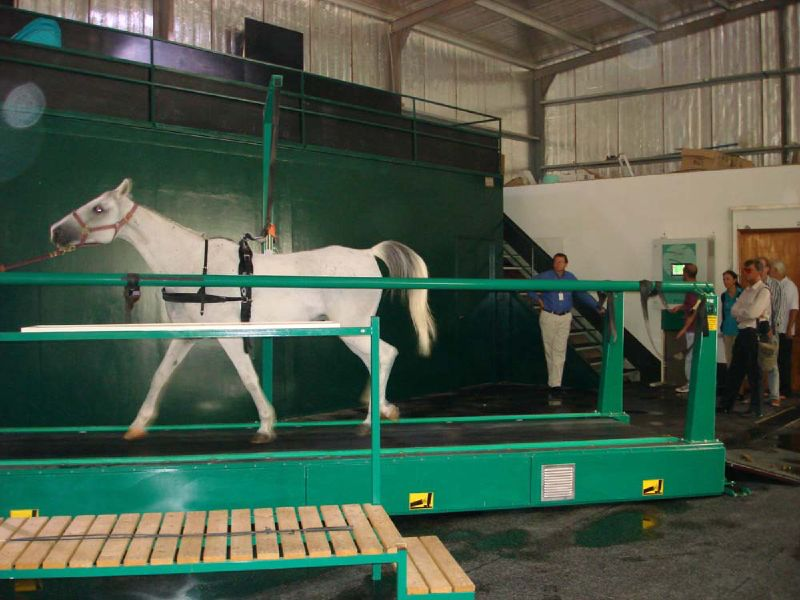
Treadmill speed may be adjusted as the injury heals.

Passive flexion may be used to help maintain range of motion in a joint, especially following joint surgery which can predispose the joint to adhesion and formation.

=== High-speed treadmill ===
The high-speed treadmill offers the option of adjusting speed, distance, slope, and degree of weight-bearing (through weighted saddles) of the horse. Heart rate may be monitored to assess impact of training on the cardiovascular system. Training factors that are especially stressful to a particular injury, such as degree of slope in a horse with a tendon injury, may be adjusted gradually to slowly increase the force placed on the recovering tissue. This allows for individualized rehabilitation. However, horses require more work on the treadmill when compared to work under-saddle to produce the same degree of oxygen consumption, and therefore the treadmill is not a suitable substitute for regular training with a rider when conditioning an animal for performance.

=== Underwater treadmill ===
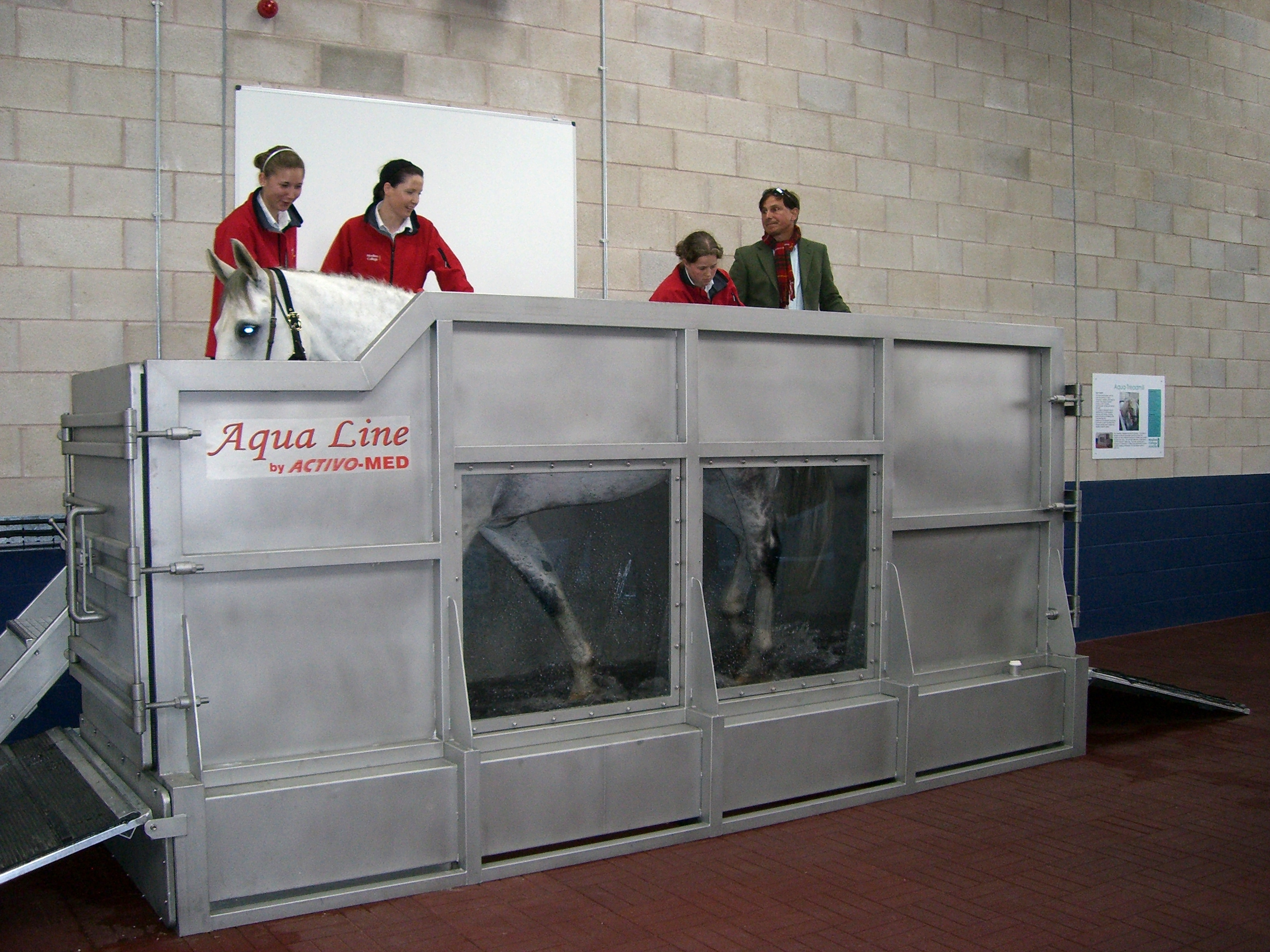
A horse working on an underwater treadmill.

Aquatic therapy has been shown to improve muscle strength, especially in the core, back, and stifles, and to increase both cardiovascular condition and proprioception in horses. The underwater treadmill is a popular tool for equine rehabilitation, and can offer targeted therapy based on water depth. At lower depths, horses will pick their legs up out of the water to clear it in the flight phase of the stride. In this case, the depth may be adjusted to improve the range of motion of a specific joint, offering the option of customizing treatment to a particular injury. Higher depths can increase pelvic flexion and raising of the back, helping to strengthen muscles that are commonly used by riding horses, conditioning them without the added weight of a rider. High water levels can also reduce body mass, similar to the effects seen with swimming, and may be beneficial for joint injuries or fractures. However, the animal will develop muscular and cardiovascular fitness much faster than they will develop skeletal strength. This may make the horse appear to be better-prepared for strenuous work than it truly is, and early return to work may place the bones, joints, tendons, and ligaments at much greater risk of injury. Therefore, care must be taken to build up bone strength before the animal is placed into regular work under-saddle.

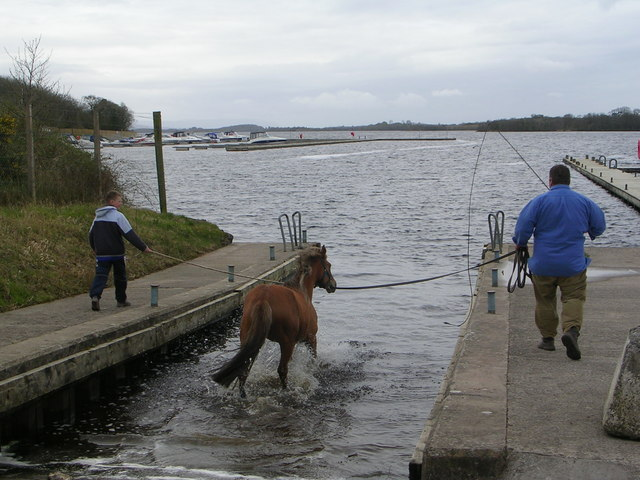
Swimming is a common rehabilitation method.

=== Swimming ===
The buoyancy effect of water makes swimming close to non-weight bearing. It allows the horse to maintain condition while reducing trauma to joints, making it especially useful for animals recovering from joint-related lameness. However, weight-bearing rehabilitation is also important before the animal goes back to normal exercise, since swimming does not maintain joint tone. Additionally, swimming encourages the horse to maintain a hollow, inverted position with the head up, back dropped, and legs kicking out behind it. It is therefore less suitable for riding horses that are expected to develop the strength to carry the back up with an engaged hind end, and may also be associated with back or stifle problems.

=== Hyperbaric oxygen therapy ===
Hyperbaric oxygen therapy (HBOT) is a treatment where the animal is placed in a chamber that is pressurized and filled with 100% oxygen. This high-pressure environment increases the amount of oxygen carried in solution within the blood, thereby delivering a significantly greater amount to tissues. HBOT has been shown to improve healing of infections in people, because it creates oxygen free radicals which damage bacterial DNA, elevates tissue oxygen levels which can be toxic to anaerobic bacteria, and can increase antibiotic transfer into bacteria. HBOT has been shown to improve wound healing and is effective in treating ischemic tissue damage and compartment syndrome. Approved uses for HBOT in humans include clostridial myositis, crush injury, carbon monoxide poisoning, compartment syndrome, treatment for chronic wounds, osteomyelitis and abscesses, skin flaps or grafts, and burns.

Despite the considerable use in human medicine, use in the horse is relatively new and few studies have been published on its benefits. Its effects have been shown to be quite transient in the horse, with arterial blood oxygen levels remaining elevated for only 10 minutes following treatment. However, it has been used to treat various conditions, including infectious (fungal and bacterial, including cellulitis), carbon monoxide or smoke inhalation, neurologic disease (head injury, “dummy foal” syndrome, and peripheral neuropathies), gastrointestinal disease (ileus), exertional rhabdomyolysis, and laminitis. Some studies have discouraging results for its use. It has been shown to be detrimental to the viability of skin grafts in horses, and only minimal effects on horses with induced endotoxemia. HBOT is considered very safe, with few contraindications, although its cost and availability make it less widely used than most other forms of treatment.

== Neurectomy ==
Neurectomy refers to a surgical procedure in which a specific nerve is severed, thereby preventing sensation to a particular area. It is used when other methods of treatment have failed to reduce pain. In the United States, this procedure commonly refers to cutting of the palmar or plantar digital nerves to prevent sensation of the foot. It is often used to treat chronic foot pain, such as navicular syndrome, that is refractory to other methods of treatment. About 92% of horses respond to surgery, and one-third of horses develop postoperative complications, including neuroma formation, unresolved lameness, or early recurrence of lameness. The surgery is generally less successful when lameness is caused by injury to the deep digital flexor tendon, so magnetic resonance imaging is recommended to determine the cause of lameness prior to surgery to avoid performing a neurectomy in these horses.

Neurectomy is also used to treat chronic hind limb suspensory ligament desmopathy. Suspensory injury, and the subsequent swelling of the ligament, is thought to produce a compartment syndrome that compresses the adjacent lateral plantar nerve, leading to inflammation of the nerve. This pressure can continue even after the ligament has healed, resulting in chronic pain. In this case, the deep branch of the lateral plantar nerve is severed. The procedure has been shown to have good results in cases of chronic proximal suspensory desmitis of the hind limb (78% success rate), assuming the horse has no other musculoskeletal problems.

== Arthrodesis ==
Arthrodesis is a procedure in which a joint is fused, either surgically or chemically.

=== Chemical arthrodesis ===
Chemical arthrodesis destroys the cartilage of the joint, producing ankylosis, and may also reduce pain immediately due to neurolysis. Often intra-articular injection of monoiodoacetate (MIA) or ethyl alcohol is used. Ethyl alcohol has several advantages over MIA, including decreased pain (MIA produces severe pain for several hours following injection), lower cost, and easy access. Chemical arthrodesis is commonly performed to treat osteoarthritis of the lower hock joints. These joints have little motion and can fuse without affecting the movement of the horse. Chemical arthrodesis has the potential to greatly improve chronic lameness which is not responding to IA anti-inflammatories, but carries the risk of severe complications, including joint sepsis, cellulitis, and severe lameness. Chemical arthrodesis is cheap, simple, and relatively noninvasive, but is potentially disastrous if the proximal intertarsal joint communicates with the high-motion tarsocrural joint. For this reason, a contrast study is often recommended prior to treatment to ensure no communication occurs between the two joints. Chemical arthrodesis has the potential to damage the joint cartilage without fusing the joint, leading to increased pain and lameness. Chemical arthrodesis is less successful when used in the pastern joint, and often surgical arthrodesis is preferred.

=== Surgical arthrodesis ===
Surgical arthrodesis may be produced by internal fixation, intra-articular drilling, intra-articular laser treatment (which damages chondrocytes), or surgical removal of joint cartilage to produce ankylosis. Surgical arthrodesis is used as a technique for treating pain in low-motion joints, such as the lower hock joints. When used in the lower hock joints, it has a high success rate for return to function, but is more expensive and invasive than chemical arthrodesis. Pastern osteoarthritis is also treated with surgical arthrodesis, and can lead to improved comfort and return to athletic function. Surgical arthrodesis may also be used in high-motion joints. Because it results in alteration of gait, the horse cannot be used for athletic pursuits following surgery. It is used as a salvaging procedure to save the horse with an injury that disrupts the stability of a joint, such as septic arthritis, failure of the suspensory apparatus, subluxation, fracture, or collateral ligament rupture, or may be used to treat chronic osteoarthritis. It is most commonly used to treat disease of the coffin, fetlock, carpal, and shoulder joints.

== Tenotomy and ligament desmotomy ==
Transection of a soft tissue structure may be required to provide a horse with the best chance of regaining soundness. These procedures include the cutting of tendons (tenotomy) or ligaments (ligament desmotomy).

=== Deep digital flexor tendon tenotomy ===
The deep digital flexor tendon (DDFT) runs down the back of the leg and attaches on the bottom surface of the coffin bone. Contraction of the deep digital flexor muscle will flex the digit. At rest, the DDFT applies a constant traction to the bottom surface of the coffin bone, which is counteracted by the laminae holding the coffin bone to the hoof wall.

DDFT tenotomy is usually recommended in cases of laminitis and coffin bone rotation that is chronic or non-responsive to other forms of treatment. Transection of the DDFT reduces the pull on the bottom of the coffin bone, and subsequently decreases the stress placed on the laminae of the hoof. A horse will not be athletically useful following a DDFT tenotomy, with a best-case scenario of the animal returning to pasture soundness or possibly for comfortable enough for light pleasure riding. It is therefore considered a salvage procedure to improve the quality of life of the horse, often as final effort to avoid euthanasia. This procedure may be performed standing under local anesthesia. The DDFT is cut at the level of the mid-cannon or mid-pastern, although the mid-cannon is preferred to avoid the flexor tendon sheath. A DDFT tenotomy can also be used to treat severe cases of flexural limb deformity in foals, but it is also a salvage procedure and prevents the animal from any future athletic use.

This procedure is quite painful and requires good analgesia in the days following surgery. Proper hoof trimming and shoeing is essential following surgery. The horse is at-risk of subluxation of the coffin joint, which may be counteracted by raising the heels of the horse. The toe may also lift off the ground when the horse weights its heels, which may be counteracted by adding heel extensions to the shoe.

=== Inferior check ligament desmotomy ===
The inferior check ligament, also known as the distal check ligament or accessory ligament of the deep digital flexor tendon, runs from the palmar aspect of the knee to the deep digital flexor tendon approximately halfway down the length of the cannon bone. The main purpose of the ligament is to support and to prevent the over-extension of the deep digital flexor tendon. The inferior check ligament desmotomy transects the ligament to reduce the pull of the deep digital flexor tendon.

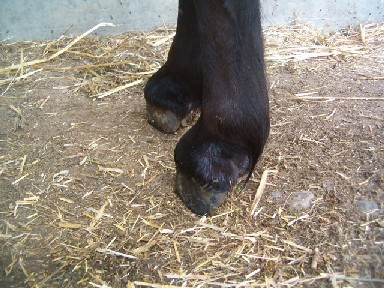
Flexural limb deformity requires aggressive treatment to prevent permanent lameness.

Inferior check ligament desmotomy is primarily used to treat flexural limb deformities secondary to deep digital flexor contracture. Contracture of the DDF forces the limb to maintain a constant flexed position in the fetlock and coffin joints, and if not corrected can be devastating to the athletic potential of an animal. Transection of the inferior check ligament reduces the pull of the DDF tendon, and allows the joints of the digit to their normal position. Check ligament desmotomy is considered superior to a deep digital flexor tenotomy because the animal has reduced pain and a greater chance of returning to full function following surgery. It has the greatest rate of success when contracture has not progressed to the point where the dorsal surface of the hoof wall is beyond vertical. Horses treated at a young age (around 6 months old) have a better prognosis than those treated around 12 months of age.

Like the DDFT tenotomy, the inferior check ligament desmotomy may also be used to treat laminitis, and is less aggressive than a DDFT tenotomy. It is also used to treat navicular syndrome that is thought to occur due to a broken-forward hoof axis, especially in cases of upright feet, and when DDFT contracture occurs secondary to chronic reduced weight-bearing on the limb.

=== Superior check ligament desmotomy ===
The superior check ligament, also known as the proximal check ligament or accessory ligament of the superficial digital flexor tendon, runs from distal aspect of the radius and inserts into the superficial digital flexor tendon just above the knee. It supports the superficial digital flexor tendon (SDFT), helping to prevent over-stretching. The superior check ligament desmotomy transects the ligament to allow greater relaxation of the SDFT.

This surgical procedure is used in cases of foals with flexural limb deformity secondary to contracture of the superficial digital flexor. It may be used in conjunction with an inferior check desmotomy if the DDFT is also contracted. Superior check ligament desmotomy is also used in cases of superficial digital flexor tendinitis in racehorses and upper level performance horses, if the tendinitis is recurrent, diffuse, or when the core lesion is >10% of the tendon cross-sectional area. It may be used in conjunction with tendon splitting and annular ligament desmotomy. In racehorses with moderate to severe tendinitis of the SDFT, 69% returned to racing following a superior check ligament desmotomy, and were able to do so faster than horses that had not undergone the procedure.

Unlike the inferior check ligament desmotomy, transection of the superior check ligament requires general anesthesia.

=== Palmar annular ligament desmotomy ===
The palmar annular ligament is located on the back of the fetlock, covering the SDFT and DDFT as they wrap around the joint. Injury to the flexor tendons leads to inflammation, edema, and secondary compression of the surrounding tissues, similar to carpal tunnel syndrome. This makes it more difficult for the SDFT to glide over the surface of the joint, and the palmar annular ligament may thicken and adhere to the tendon sheath or SDFT, further reducing function of the SDFT and worsening lameness. Transection of the palmar annular ligament aims to release the pressure placed on these soft-tissue structures. It is used in cases of SDFT or DDFT tendinitis, and in chronic tendosynovitis of the SDFT. It is most successful when used to treat tendinitis of the SDFT when paired with superficial ligament desmotomy.

=== Tendon splitting ===
Tendon splitting is used when a large core lesion exists within a tendon, which contains edema and damaged tissue. With ultrasound guidance, a needle or scalpel blade is inserted through the skin and into the lesion to drain it, reducing pressure on the injury and improving vascularization. Tendon splitting has been shown to reduce the size of the lesion and improve organization of fibers during healing. This technique is not appropriate for minor lesions, as it may worsen them, and is best performed within 2 weeks of injury. It thought to be more efficacious when combined with superficial check ligament desmotomy.

== Counterirritants ==
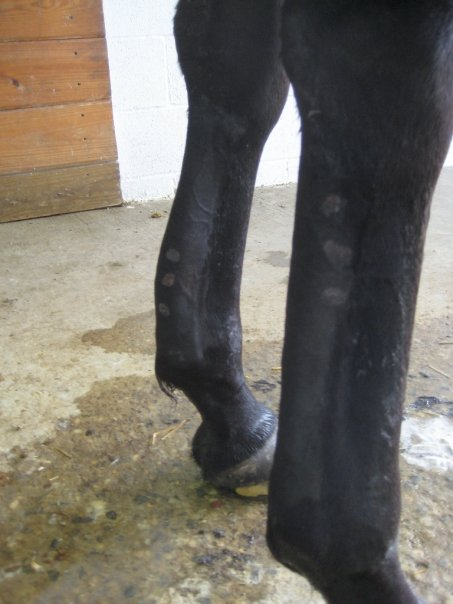
Previous firing is evident on both front legs.

Counterirritation is a collection of techniques used to promote inflammation, either through the use of a caustic substance or cautery, with the purpose of improving blood flow to an area of injury. Counterirritation has been used by horsemen for thousands of years, but its present-day use is controversial. Although practiced less commonly today, it is still considered a valid therapy by some practitioners, especially those on the racetrack. Thermocautery (pin firing) has been declared “unethical” by the Royal College of Veterinary Surgeons, although it is considered an acceptable therapy by the American Association of Equine Practitioners “when applied judiciously and in conjunction with appropriate analgesia and aftercare… in cases that have proven refractory to conventional treatment.”

=== Blistering ===
Blistering agents are chemical substances used to irritate tissues, leading to inflammation, increased circulation, necrosis, and scarring. They may be applied topically or injected. The most commonly used external (topical) blistering agents contain iodine, mercuric iodide, or turpentine, which are rubbed or brushed onto the skin overlaying the site of injury, and while they cause scaling of the skin, they tend to produce only low levels of soreness. Stronger blistering solutions may be made using red mercuric iodide. These require the use of a neck cradle, and the horse risks laminitis and lymphangitis if not walked regularly. Blistering is used for a variety of lameness problems, including splints, curbs, sore shins, tendonitis, suspensory desmitis, and sesamoiditis.

Internal blistering is more common in the United States. Usually, a substance containing iodine or almond oil is injected into the site of interest to treat splints, curbs, and suspensory desmitis, with varying results. One of the more generally accepted uses for internal blistering is for treatment of upward fixation of the patella. The irritant is injected into the patellar ligaments, leading to inflammation and scarring. The scarred ligaments shorten, making it easier for the patella to slip off the medial trochlear ridge and reducing locking of the patella.

=== Firing ===
“Firing”, or thermal injury, includes thermocautery and cold firing. In both cases, firing is performed after the initial inflammation associated with the injury has subsided. The horse is sedated, and the area is clipped and blocked with a local anesthetic. The most common form of firing is “pin firing”, which uses a specialized machine with a hot tip to penetrate through the skin and into the tendon or periosteum. Multiple applications are applied in rows over the site of injury. As expected, horses require analgesia following this procedure. Uses for pin firing include tendonitis, suspensory desmitis, sesamoiditis, splints, curbs, and other soft-tissue injuries. Cold firing is a method similar to pin firing, but uses liquid nitrogen to produce its effects. It is often used to treat lameness associated with the bone, such as sore shins or splints, and usually only after other treatments have failed. Firing forces rest of an injury, and while some argue this is the true reason it leads to any improvement of lameness, others contest that undeniable success in its use has been seen. Pin firing is not taught in veterinary schools in present day.

== Laminitis prevention ==
Support-limb laminitis occurs in horses with a severe, unilateral lameness that causes them to not bear weight on one leg. The contralateral (opposite) leg then bears all of the weight, which reduces blood flow to the hoof and strains the attachments of the laminae, leading to laminitis. Although support-limb laminitis is a risk for any horse that is not weight-bearing lame, occurring in roughly 16% of cases, it is uncommon in foals and yearlings. It usually occurs weeks to months after the initial cause of lameness, and greatly increases the likelihood of euthanasia of the patient. Support-limb laminitis was the primary cause for euthanasia of the racehorse Barbaro.

In cases of severe unilateral lameness, aggressive pain management using a combination of drugs in various classes such as opioids, alpha-2 agonists, ketamine, topical NSAIDs, and local anesthetics should be considered. Epidurals may also be helpful in hind limb lameness. Horses at risk for contralateral laminitis may be prophylactically treated with aggressive icing and supportive shoeing.
