= Navicular syndrome =

Disease that affects horses

Navicular syndrome, often called navicular disease, is a syndrome of lameness problems in horses. It most commonly describes an inflammation or degeneration of the navicular bone and its surrounding tissues, usually on the front feet. It can lead to significant and even disabling lameness.

== Description of the navicular area ==
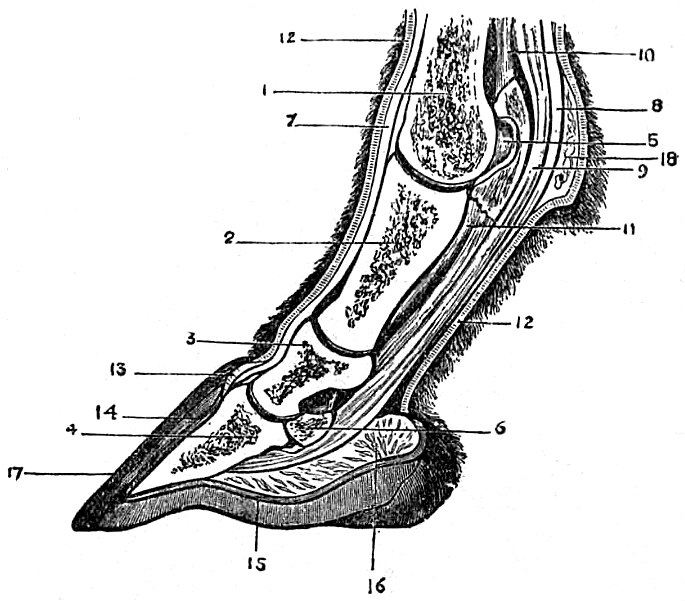
Cross section of horse foot. The relevant areas are: 2. First phalanx.3. Second phalanx. 4. Coffin bone. 6. Navicular bone. 9. Deep digital flexor tendon. 16. Digital cushion. 17. Hoof.

Knowledge of equine forelimb anatomy is especially useful for understanding navicular syndrome. The navicular bone lies behind the coffin bone and under the small pastern bone (middle phalanx). The deep digital flexor (DDF) tendon runs down the back of the cannon bone within the digital flexor tendon sheath and under the navicular bone before inserting on the flexor surface of the distal phalanx. The DDF tendon primarily flexes the distal interphalangeal (coffin) joint and also contributes to flexion of more proximal joints. The navicular bone acts as a biomechanical fulcrum and increases the mechanical advantage of the DDF tendon.

The navicular bone is stabilized by the impar ligament distally at its attachment to the coffin bone (distal phalanx), and by the collateral ligaments of the navicular bone extending from the upper portion on either side, attaching on the medial and lateral aspects of the long pastern bone (proximal phalanx). Hyaline cartilage covers the articular surface of the navicular bone where it articulates with the middle and distal phalanges, and fibrocartilage is present on the flexor surface between the navicular bone and the DDF tendon. The navicular bursa lies between the navicular bone and the DDF tendon, reducing friction and pressure.

== Causes and contributing factors ==
There is no single known cause of navicular syndrome, although there are many theories, and several primary factors.

The first factor is compression of the navicular bone under the DDF tendon and the back of the small pastern bone. Repeated compression in this area can cause cartilage degeneration, with the cartilage flattening and gradually becoming less springy and shock-absorbing. It may also begin to erode. Cartilage degeneration is common in navicular horses, usually along the flexor surface. This finding, and the associated biochemical changes, have led some researchers to conclude that there are elements in navicular disease common to osteoarthritis, and to suggest similar therapeutic regimes.

Cartilage erosion may progress to the point that the bone underneath will become exposed. With the cartilage no longer present to protect it, the navicular bursa and DDF tendon may become damaged by the constant rubbing against the navicular bone. Navicular bursitis (inflammation of the navicular bursa) may occur, even if cartilage damage is not severe. This is probably due to the friction between the navicular bone and the DDF tendon from compression.

Constant compression can also increase the bone density directly under the cartilage surfaces, especially on the flexor side. This tends to make the bone more brittle, and thus more likely to break.

Another main factor is the tension placed on the ligaments that support the navicular bone. Some experts believe that the degenerative process begins with excess tension placed on these ligaments, causing strain and inflammation. Inflammation from strain of the impar ligament can decrease blood flow to and from the navicular bone, as the major blood vessels supplying the bone run up and down this area. If the ligament continues to be strained, it can thicken and permanently reduce blood flow to the navicular bone.

Because veins are more easily compressed than arteries, blood flow to the bone would be less obstructed than blood flow from the bone. This would cause a buildup of pressure within the navicular bone. The navicular bone, in response to both the increased pressure and overall decreased blood supply, would absorb mineral from its center.

Excess tension can also cause exostoses where the ligaments attach to the navicular bone, giving the bone a "canoe" shape. If tension is extreme, the ligaments may actually tear.

Recent research has found correlations between "toe-first landing" of the hooves and navicular problems, due to excessive strain put on the deep digital flexor tendon, as a consequence of misalignment of the lower joints. Toe-first landing, usually seen as a consequence of navicular disease, may actually be a cause or at least a contributing factor to the onset of tendon inflammation and bone modifications.

Some breeds like the Quarter Horse and the Thoroughbred are more likely to face navicular syndrome because of their genes. Although genetics do not directly cause the condition, they affect conformation, which plays a significant role in its development.

Toe-first landing is often caused by frog and heel overtrimming, long toes, and/or poor shoeing.

== Contributing factors ==
=== Conformation ===
Certain conformational defects may contribute to navicular syndrome, especially defects that promote concussion. These include upright pasterns, small feet, narrow and upright feet, significant downhill build (commonly seen in American Quarter Horses), and long toes with low heels (commonly seen in Thoroughbreds).

The long toe, low heel conformation places constant stress on the navicular bone, even as the horse is standing. Upright feet increase concussion, especially in the heel region of the hoof where the navicular bone is located. Excess concussion cannot be absorbed as well by the structures designed to do so (the frog, heels, and digital cushion), so more impact is transmitted to the structures within the foot.

Poor hoof shape is usually inherited, although poor shoeing and trimming can contribute to these shapes.

With the long toe, low heel conformation can come contracted heels (narrowing of the heel) which further compresses the navicular bone along with sheared heels adding more stress to the tendons and navicular bones.

=== Shoeing ===
Poor trimming, shoe selection, or inappropriate shoe attachment are well-known causes of lameness, and navicular disease is fairly common in the modern-day domesticated horse. However, it is also seen in wild horse populations. Those who advocate "barefoot trimming" of domestic horses propose that in nature, a horse's hoof is designed to expand and contract as the horse moves. This expanding and contracting acts as an auxiliary blood pump, and aids the circulation of blood to the lower extremities. When an inflexible metal shoe is improperly attached to the hoof, the hoof can no longer work as designed, and blood flow is inhibited. However, evidence of navicular degeneration has been established in the fossil record of early horses. Mary Thompson, a vertebrate paleontologist at Idaho Museum of Natural History, has found evidence in many species of early horses and concludes, "The results of this study strongly suggest that man’s intervention (whether by increased usage or improper breeding practices) may not be the sole cause of the syndrome", although she cautions that her results are preliminary.

=== Work ===
Working on steep hills, galloping, and jumping all contribute to navicular syndrome, as they place greater stress on the DDF tendons, and may cause overextension of the pastern and coffin joints.

Regular exercise on hard or irregular ground increases concussion on the hoof, thus increasing the risk of navicular syndrome.

It is possible that standing can also increase the chance of navicular disease (such as a horse that spends most of the day in a stall with little turnout, as with some racehorses and show horses). Blood flow to the hoof decreases when the horse is not in motion. The horse is also constantly applying pressure to the navicular bones (which is intermittent as the horse moves).

=== Body weight ===
Horses with a high weight-to-foot-size ratio may have an increased chance of exhibiting symptoms of navicular syndrome, since the relative load on the foot increases. This might explain why the syndrome is seen more frequently in Thoroughbreds, American Quarter Horses, and Warmbloods as opposed to ponies and Arabians.

== Signs ==
Heel pain is very common in horses with navicular syndrome. Lameness may begin as mild and intermittent, and progress to severe. This may be due to strain and inflammation of the ligaments supporting the navicular bone, reduced blood flow and increased pressure within the hoof, damage to the navicular bursa or DDF tendon, or from cartilage erosion.

Affected horses display a "tiptoe" gait – trying to walk on the toes due to heel pain. They may stumble frequently. The lameness may switch from one leg to another, and may not be consistent. Lameness usually occurs in both front feet, although one foot may be more sore than the other.

Lameness is usually mild (1–2 on a scale of 5). It can be made worse when the horse is worked on a hard surface or on a circle.

After several months of pain, the feet may begin to change shape, especially the foot that has been experiencing the most pain, which tends to become more upright and narrow.

== Treatment and prognosis ==
No single treatment works for all cases, probably because there is no single cause for all cases. The degenerative changes are usually quite advanced by the time the horse is consistently lame, and these changes are believed to be non-reversible. At this time, it is best to manage the condition and focus on alleviating pain and slowing the degeneration.

=== Trimming ===
Putting the foot into proper neurological and biomechanical balance is crucial. Often navicular horses have long toes and underrun heels with very little inner wall depth or strength. Exposing the horse to proper stimulus to improve hoof form and structure is also vital.

=== Hoof care ===
The issue of hoof care is a subject of great debate. Corrective shoeing can be beneficial to horses suffering from navicular disease, although sometimes the effects are only temporary. Others believe that removing the shoes altogether is the best way to manage this disease, as it allows increased circulation to the hoof. People on both sides agree that proper hoof shape and angle are an important long-term management plan for a horse with navicular disease. As with laminitis, different horses may respond in different ways to a given technique, so the farrier, owner, and veterinarian should work as a team to formulate a plan and to adapt if the initial plan is not effective.

People who choose to treat navicular disease through shoeing may use a shoe designed to lift and support the heels. This can sometimes be accomplished with a flat shoe and trimming alone. Wedge pads or wedged shoes are often used, but can amplify heel-related problems if present. Another strategy is to use a bar type shoe. Often, an egg-bar shoe, or straight bar shoe. Some horses benefit from shoes that change the breakover of their foot (like a rolled toe). With or without shoes, the hoof must be trimmed in such a way as to restore the balance and angle that may have been lost. Horses with long toe-low heel conformation need careful trimming to counter this. Horses with upright feet may need their heels lowered and a shoe that will allow their heels to spread. Early intervention is key; in one study, shoeing was successful in 97% of horses treated within ten months of the onset of signs, while only 54% of horses lame for over a year responded.

Advocates of barefoot trimming cite recent studies which show that removing the shoes can help alleviate the symptoms of navicular disease, and in some cases, reverse some of the damage done to the hoof. Because navicular disease can be caused, or at least exacerbated by shoeing, removing the cause is the first step in this strategy toward the management of pain in the animal. Successive carefully applied trims help to restore the natural angle and shape of the hoof, while walking helps to stimulate circulation to the hoof. It is not uncommon to find horses whose navicular disease is completely manageable through corrective barefoot trimming. However, this may require a transition period lasting from weeks to years where the horse may remain lame, or may never become sound.

If there is significant degeneration in the bone, a flexor cortex cyst, adhesions to the deep digital flexor tendon, or avulsion fractures, relief is typically incomplete no matter what foot care technique is used.

=== Exercise ===
Horses with navicular syndrome need a less intense work schedule. Their fitness can be maintained through slow long-distance work or swimming, as opposed to being worked at high speeds, up steep hills, or on hard surfaces, irregular terrain, or deep footing. Reducing the frequency of jumping is also important. Some veterinarians and hoof care practitioners recommend exercising the horse on varied terrain to stimulate and strengthen the caudal hoof structures.

=== Medication ===
Vasodilators improve the blood flow into the vessels of the hoof. Examples include isoxsuprine (currently unavailable in the UK) and pentoxifylline.

Anticoagulants can also improve blood flow. The use of warfarin has been proposed, but the extensive monitoring required makes it unsuitable in most cases.

Anti-inflammatory drugs are used to treat the pain, and can help the lameness resolve sometimes if shoeing and training changes are made. Include Nonsteroidal anti-inflammatory drugs (NSAIDs), corticosteroids, and other joint medications. The use of intramuscular glycosaminoglycans has been shown to decrease pain in horses with navicular disease, but this effect wanes after discontinuation of therapy. Oral glycosaminoglycans may have a similar effect.

Bisphosphonates can be useful in cases where bone remodeling is causing pain.

Gallium nitrate (GaN) has been hypothesized as a possible treatment for navicular disease, but its benefits have not been confirmed by formal clinical studies. One pilot study examined horses given gallium nitrate in their feed rations. While it was absorbed slowly, it did stay in the animals' system, providing a baseline dosage for future studies.

=== Surgery ===
Palmar digital neurectomy (or "nerving" or "denerving") is not without adverse side effects and should therefore be used as a last resort. In this procedure, the palmar digital nerves are severed, so the horse loses sensation in the back of the foot. This procedure should only be performed if it will eliminate the lameness associated with navicular syndrome, and only after all other options have been explored. The procedure is usually performed on both front feet. Complications can include infection of the wound, continuation of the lameness (if the nerves regrow or if small branches of the nerves are not removed), neuromas, and rupture of the deep digital flexor tendon. After the neurectomy, if the horse becomes injured in the area the injury may go undetected for a long period of time, which risks the animal's health. Due to this, the feet should be cleaned and inspected regularly. Neurectomy tends to lower the market value of a horse, and may even make the horse ineligible for competition. Neurectomy is controversial. The most common misconception about "nerving" a horse is that it will permanently solve the lameness/pain issue. In fact, though the time periods vary based on the individual horse and surgical method utilized, these nerves often regenerate and return sensation to the afflicted region within two to three years.

In navicular suspensory desmotomy, the ligaments supporting the navicular bone are severed. This makes the navicular bone more mobile, and thus reduces the tension of the other ligaments. It is successful about half of the time.

== Prognosis ==
The prognosis for a horse with navicular syndrome is guarded. Many times the horse does not return to its former level of competition. Others are retired. Eventually all horses with the syndrome will need to lessen the strenuousness of their work, but with proper management, a horse with navicular syndrome can remain useful for some time.

== See also ==
- Horse evolution

== Sources ==
- King, Christine & Mansmann, Richard Equine Lameness. Equine Research (1997). (p. 610-626).
- PT Colahan, IG Mayhew, AM Merrit & JN Moore Manual of Equine Medicine and Surgery Copyright Mosby Inc (1999). (p. 402-407).
- RJ Rose & DR Hodgson Manual of Equine Practice Copyright WB Saunders (2000). (p. 126-128).
