= Bowed tendon =

Inflamed tendon in a horse

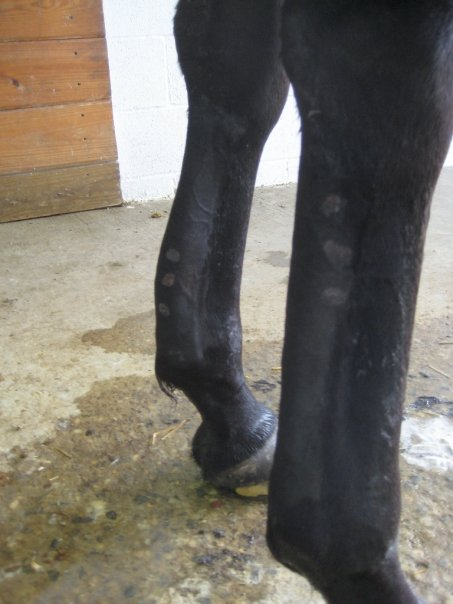
Bilateral bowed tendons

A bowed tendon is a term for a tendon injury in a horse that causes swelling in one or more tendons creating a "bowed" appearance. It is a form of tendinitiscausing inflammation and often involving torn collagen fibers.

== Tendinitis in horses ==
Tendinitis typically involves disruption of tendon fibers and is most commonly observed in the superficial digital flexor tendon (SDFT) of the front leg, which runs along the back of the limb near the surface. The formation of a visible “bow” is less common in the deep digital flexor tendon (DDFT) of the front leg but occurs more frequently in the pastern and foot regions. Tendinitis of the SDFT or DDFT in the hind leg is less common.

When the SDFT is damaged significantly, there is a thickening of the tendon, giving it a bowed appearance when the leg is viewed from the side. Bows usually occur in the middle of the tendon region, although they may also be seen in the upper third, right below the knee or hock (high bows), and lower third, just above the fetlock (low bows).

== Causes and factors of tendinitis in horses ==
=== Excessive strain ===
Excessive strain on a tendon can damage its collagen fibers. This is most commonly seen in performance horses that gallop or jump, who usually strain a tendon as a result of fetlock overextension when their weight is loaded on one leg. The overextension of the fetlock causes overstretching of the flexor tendons, resulting in the rupture of tendon fibers. Horses in intense training, especially those that were not conditioned properly, may damage many collagen fibers. This may occur gradually or suddenly.

After the fibers are torn, the tendon hemorrhages and collects fluid (edema), creating swelling and lameness in the area as well as increasing the pressure. The increase in pressure may damage the tendon further by destroying the cross-linking of undamaged collagen fibers and preventing the flow of blood to the area.

=== Superficial digital flexor tendon ===
The middle third of the superficial digital flexor tendon (SDFT) is most likely to suffer from tendinitis for several reasons.

The SDFT is narrower in its middle third than its top or bottom sections, making it weaker. The top and bottom of the SDFT has a better supply of blood as well, with the top third supplied by the vessels from the knee, and the bottom third supplied by the vessels in the fetlock. The middle third has a poor supply of blood, relying on the tiny vessels of the peritendon (the membrane that surrounds the tendons). If this supply is for some reason compromised, the collagen fibers in the area may die, weakening the tendon in that area and making it more likely to tear.

The SDFT branches below the fetlock, creating a sling under the back of the joint. Thus, overextension of the fetlock is more likely to overstretch the SDFT than the DDFT, which simply travels straight down behind the fetlock and pastern, to attach to the coffin bone.

=== Other factors ===
- Poor conformation: long, sloping pasterns and a long-toe, low-heel shape to the hoof (seen commonly in Thoroughbreds) predisposes a horse to tendinitis.
- Poor trimming and shoeing: such as a farrier that causes a hoof shape that predisposes the horse to tendon injuries (such as a long toe and low heel), or one that shoes a horse with toe grabs, which artificially create a long toe and low heel by lifting the toe up.
- Improper conditioning: such as working a horse at an intensity that it has not yet been conditioned for, working an unfit horse, and continuing to work an extremely fatigued horse.
- Poor footing: working a horse on uneven or slippery footing can cause tendon strain, as well as deep, "thick" footing.
- Direct trauma to a tendon: such as when a horse hits its front leg with a hind hoof.

Each of these factors, except the last, encourage the overextension of the fetlock and knee during work. Several of these factors at once can add up.

== Bandage bows ==
Bandage bows are caused by applying a bandage too tightly, creating an acute pressure injury to the tendons. The compression may cause the area to swell once the bandage is removed, giving a "bowed" appearance. However, the damage is often just to the skin and not to the tendon itself, but tendon injury can occur from impaired blood flow.

Horses with bandage bows usually respond to sweats or poultices. These treatments must be applied under a bandage that is not tightly fitted and the bandage should only be left on for a few hours. Cold hosing, NSAIDs and DMSO may also help.

== Signs of tendinitis in horses ==
Signs of acute tendinitis include swelling, heat, and pain when the affected area is palpated. If mild, swelling may not be readily apparent, although there will still be heat and pain in the area, as well as mild lameness. If more severe, the injury is usually accompanied by moderate lameness (2–3 on a scale of 5) with obvious swelling.

It is important to palpate not only the SDFT but the branches of the SDFT, the DDFT, check ligament, and suspensory ligament as well. These structures could have been damaged at the same time as the SDFT. Both legs should be checked, although tendinitis usually only occurs in one leg.

When the tendon is healed, it will still have a thickened, bowed appearance that feels firm and woody. However, all heat, lameness, and pain should disappear.

== Treatment of tendinitis in horses ==
Initial treatment of a bowed tendon should concentrate on anti-inflammatory therapies, including cold water or ice therapy, and anti-inflammatory medications on the direction of a veterinarian. The horse should be confined to a small area until the severity of the injury can be assessed with ultrasound. Standing bandages are helpful, but care should be taken to avoid applying them too tightly.

=== Controlled exercise ===
Generally speaking, the most important aspect of long-term therapy is controlling the level of exercise. A balance must be struck between two competing ideas:

- The injured tendon is weakened, making it prone to further injury with excessive exercise.
- Tendons strengthen along lines of tension, which requires exercise.

For the first several months, large area turnout is discouraged, since even a small amount of running or playing could easily re-injure the weakened tendon. As the tendon heals, it is loaded in increasing amounts. The use of diagnostic ultrasonography is extremely valuable in guiding changes in workload.

=== Adjunctive therapies ===
Many adjunctive therapies have been attempted to improve the quality of healing or to speed the recovery process. There is no consensus in the veterinary community as to which treatments are the most effective.

- A tissue regenerating bioscaffold material, being developed by TR BioSurgical, has unique properties that permits angiogenesis and produces fetal-like repair mechanisms, known to be involved in tissue turnover and repair. The new bioscaffold is currently being evaluated for a variety of connective tissue disorders in veterinary medicine. The bioscaffold structure is responsible for its non-immunogenic property and its ability to upregulate a variety of genes involved in tissue repair, as evidenced by gene microarray analysis and lead to a fetal like or regenerative tissue response. Depending on the tissue type, cells that bind to this bioscaffold will have significant, measurable increases in select tissue repair factors, including aggrecan, connective tissue growth factor (CTGF), transforming growth factors (TGF-β1 and TBF-β3), bone morphogenic protein (BMP-2) and other repair factors. These factors are important for cellular ingrowth, extracellular matrix turnover, scarless wound healing, and sustained vasculogenesis.
- Carbon fiber implants have been proven to be ineffective: these fibers are extremely strong, but inflexible, causing increased strain on adjacent normal tissue.
- Surgical drainage (tendon splitting) of core lesion tissue is controversial, but likely has some benefit in the early phases where the tear is filled with fluid. Once the lesion has granulated, this procedure is of questionable benefit.
- Extracorporeal shockwave therapy is now more commonly used as an adjunctive therapy.
- Proximal check ligament desmotomy has been shown to return horses to work faster, but is thought by some to predispose to suspensory ligament injury.
- Mesenchymal stem cells, derived from the affected horse's bone marrow or fat are currently being used as a potential therapy for SDFT tendinitis and other injuries.

== Prognosis of tendinitis in horses ==
The prognosis for return to full work depends on:

- The damage to the tendon: if there was not obvious disruption of the tendon fibers, or if the damage was minimal and healed quickly and completely, the horse has a better prognosis for returning to full work.
- The treatment used: horses with moderate or severe tendinitis have a better prognosis if managed conservatively (rested, brought back to work slowly), with about 50–60 percent returning to training. If they undergo surgery and are rehabilitated correctly, up to 70–80 percent return to full work.
- Use of the horse: horses that are used for athletic events that strain their tendons (eventing, racing) are less likely to return to their previous level of performance than those in less strenuous work (dressage, pleasure and trail riding).
- New treatments developed by VetCell Bioscience Ltd. and Vet-Stem involve the use of autologous mesenchymal stem cells to regenerate torn tendons.

The best way to ensure that an injured horse returns to full work is to rehabilitate the animal correctly. This includes slowly bringing the horse back into training, and giving the horse light exercise each day as the tendon is healing. An impatient trainer who rushes to bring the horse back to intense training is likely to cause re-injury of the tendon.

== Prevention of bowing and reducing the risk of re-injury to tendons ==
- Checking the legs: especially after hard work, it is important to feel each leg for swelling and heat, and to palpate it for pain.
- Correct trimming and shoeing: a good farrier will trim the horse's feet correctly, preserving the pastern-hoof angle, and will properly support the horse’s heels.
- Bandaging: using properly applied exercise bandages can help prevent the overextension of the fetlock.
- Correct conditioning: with a base of long, slow distance work, and a fitness schedule that is not increased too rapidly.
- Suspending training: if any sign of heat, swelling, or pain is detected.

== Sources ==
- King, Christine; Mansmann, Richard (1997). Equine Lameness. Equine Research. pp. 400–415, 532–533.

== See also ==
- Equine forelimb anatomy
