= Bastrop =

Bastrop may refer to the following places in the US, named directly or indirectly for Felipe Enrique Neri, Baron de Bastrop:

- Bastrop, Louisiana
  - Bastrop High School (Louisiana)
- Bastrop County, Texas
  - Bastrop, Texas
    - Bastrop High School (Texas)
- Bastrop Bay, in Brazoria County, Texas
