= Christian Ingerslev Baastrup =

Danish physician

- Born: 24 January 1885; Copenhagen, Denmark
- Died: 24 October 1950 (aged 65); Copenhagen, Denmark
- Education: University of Copenhagen
- Known for: Baastrup's sign
- Scientific career
- Fields: Medicine
- Workplaces: Rigshospitalet

Christian Ingerslev Baastrup (24 January 1885, in Copenhagen – 24 October 1950, in Copenhagen) was a Danish physician specializing in radiology. The Baastrup's sign is named after him.
