= Baastrup's sign =

- Other names: Kissing spine
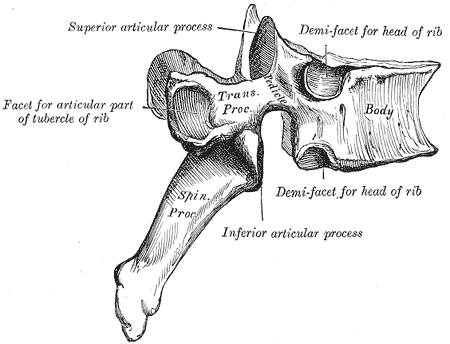
- A diagram of a human vertebral body. With Baastrup's sign, the posterior spinous process, pointing down and to the left, is abnormally thickened due to repetitive microtrauma.
- Specialty: Rheumatology

Baastrup's sign is an orthopedic and radiographic disorder that often occurs in elderly humans. It is characterized by enlargement of the posterior spinous processes of the lumbar spine, with normal intervertebral disc height and neuroforamina. The reason it is referred to as kissing spine is because the posterior spinous processes 'kiss' and touch one another as the individual goes into lumbar extension, for example when flat on their stomach. The condition has been seen in humans, canines, particularly with boxer breeds, and certain breeds of horses. This disorder is named after Christian Ingerslev Baastrup.

== Diagnosis ==
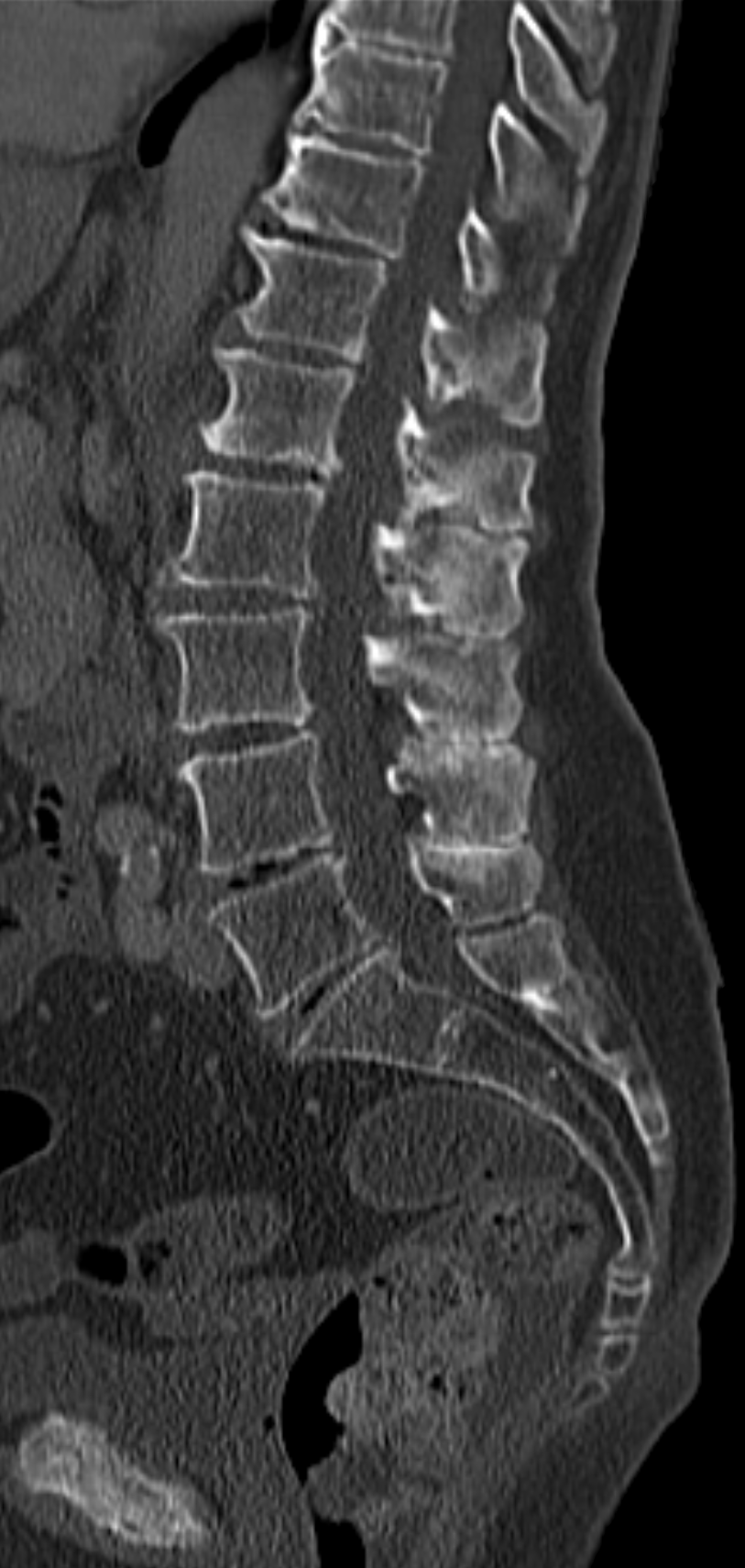
Sagittal CT of the lumbar spine showing Baastrup's sign.

The salient feature of the disorder is the exuberant osteophytosis that occurs at posterior lumbar spinous processes. Osteophytes are coarse calcifications at the edges of bone that form due to repetitive stress and trauma. There is also atrophy and fatty replacement of paraspinal musculature, which can be detected by CT or MRI.

== Treatment ==
The malpositioning seen on radiography may not cause any symptoms at all. If there are related symptoms, however, therapeutic options include chiropractic care, physical therapy and nerve block injections. As a last resort, decompressive laminectomy may be attempted to relieve pain symptoms and remove the abnormally enlarged portions of bone.
