= Deaths in September 2017 =

The following is a list of notable deaths in September 2017.

Entries for each day are listed alphabetically by surname. A typical entry lists information in the following sequence:

- Name, age, country of citizenship at birth, subsequent country of citizenship (if applicable), what subject was noted for, cause of death (if known), and reference.

== September 2017 ==
=== 1 ===
- S. Anitha, 17, Indian student, suicide by hanging.
- Armando Aste, 91, Italian alpinist.
- Shelley Berman, 92, American comedian and actor (Curb Your Enthusiasm, Meet the Fockers, You Don't Mess with the Zohan), Alzheimer's disease.
- Vladimír Brabec, 83, Czech actor and voice actor (Thirty Cases of Major Zeman, Desire, Návštěvníci).
- Jackie Burkett, 80, American football player (Baltimore Colts), leukemia.
- Jérôme Choquette, 89, Canadian lawyer and politician, MNA (1966–1976), pneumonia.
- Verner Dalskov, 85, Danish politician, mayor of Odense (1973–1992).
- Ralph Dellor, 69, British cricketer and broadcaster, sepsis.
- Lennart Eriksson, 78, Swedish Olympic wrestler.
- Isaac Fulwood, 77, American police officer, District of Columbia police chief (1989–1992).
- Bud George, 89, American politician, member of the Pennsylvania House of Representatives (1975–2013).
- Charles Gordon-Lennox, 10th Duke of Richmond, 87, British peer.
- Tony Hakaoro, 53, Cook Islands broadcaster and radio talk show host (Radio Cook Islands), stroke.
- Hedley Jones, 99, Jamaican musician, audio engineer and inventor.
- Alex Karczmar, 100, American neuroscientist.
- Elizabeth Kemp, 65, American actress (Love of Life, Challenger, He Knows You're Alone), cancer.
- Matthew Labine, 58, American soap opera writer (General Hospital).
- Peadar Lamb, 87, Irish actor (Jakers! The Adventures of Piggley Winks, Mystic Knights of Tir Na Nog, Father Ted).
- Paul Moreno, 86, American politician, member of the Texas House of Representatives (1967–2008).
- Cormac Murphy-O'Connor, 85, English Roman Catholic cardinal, Archbishop of Arundel and Brighton (1977–2000) and Westminster (2000–2009).
- Bruce Saltsman, 87, American politician.
- Paul Schaal, 74, American baseball player (Los Angeles Angels, Kansas City Royals), cancer.
- Rick Shorter, 83, American folk singer, record producer and author, stroke.
- Mick Softley, 77, British singer, songwriter and guitarist.
- Stan Swanson, 73, American baseball player (Montreal Expos).
- Štefan Vrablec, 92, Slovak Roman Catholic prelate, Auxiliary Bishop of Bratislava (1998–2004).
- Gin D. Wong, 94, Chinese-born American architect.

=== 2 ===
- Shirish Atre-Pai, 87, Indian poet.
- Marge Calhoun, 91, American surfer.
- Viktor Cherepkov, 75, Russian politician, mayor of Vladivostok (1993–1994, 1996–1998), cancer.
- Warren Church, 87, American politician, euthanasia.
- Eric Conn, 94, American biochemist.
- Halim El-Dabh, 96, Egyptian-born American composer and ethnomusicologist.
- Sybil Flory, 97, Burmese-born British teacher.
- Harry Gittes, 81, American film producer (About Schmidt, Little Nikita, The Girl Next Door).
- Murray Lerner, 90, American documentarian and producer, Oscar winner (1981), kidney failure.
- Christopher Nicole, 86, British author.
- María Cristina Orive, 86, Guatemalan photojournalist.
- Hugo Obwegeser, 96, Austrian oral and plastic surgeon, father of modern orthognathic surgery.
- Alberto Pérez Pérez, 80, Uruguayan law scholar, judge of the Inter-American Court of Human Rights.
- Ian Powe, 84, British naval officer.
- Sharad Rao, 60, Indian cricketer.
- Jeffrey B. Remmel, 68, American mathematician.
- Michael Simanowitz, 46, American politician, member of the New York State Assembly (since 2011).
- Lucky Varela, 82, American politician, member of the New Mexico House of Representatives (1987–2016).
- Drew Wahlroos, 37, American football player (St. Louis Rams), suicide by gunshot.
- Xiang Shouzhi, 99, Chinese general, commander of the Nanjing Military Region (1982–1990) and the Second Artillery Corps (1975–1977).
- Charles N. Youngblood Jr., 85, American politician.

=== 3 ===
- Tom Amundsen, 74, Norwegian Olympic rower (1972, 1976).
- John Ashbery, 90, American poet (Self-portrait in a Convex Mirror) and art critic, Pulitzer Prize winner (1976).
- Walter Becker, 67, American Hall of Fame musician (Steely Dan), songwriter and producer, Grammy winner (2001), esophageal cancer.
- William Clauson, 87, Swedish-American singer.
- Joan Colom, 96, Spanish photographer.
- John Byrne Cooke, 76, American author and musician, throat cancer.
- Luis Duarte, 76, Peruvian Olympic basketball player (1964).
- Sergio González, 92, Mexican Olympic sailor.
- Roberto Hernández Jr., 79, Mexican journalist and sportscaster.
- Jesús González, 58, Spanish Olympic rower.
- Dave Hlubek, 66, American guitarist and songwriter (Molly Hatchet), heart attack.
- Victor Krasin, 88, Ukrainian-born Russian human rights activist, economist and Soviet dissident.
- Hans Nylund, 78, Norwegian footballer
- Piet Ouderland, 84, Dutch footballer (Ajax, national team) and basketball player (national team).
- Sugar Ramos, 75, Cuban-Mexican Hall of Fame boxer, WBA/WBC featherweight champion (1963–1964), cancer.
- Larrington Walker, 70, Jamaican-born British actor (Taboo).
- John P. White, 80, American politician, U.S. Deputy Secretary of Defense (1995–1997), Parkinson's disease.
- Peter Zobel, 81, Danish Olympic equestrian (1960).

=== 4 ===
- Sultan Ahmed, 64, Indian politician, MP for Entally (since 2009), heart attack.
- Badih Chaaban, 57, South African politician, Cape Town city councilor (2006–2015), cancer.
- Don Cockburn, 87, Irish journalist, presenter and newsreader (RTÉ).
- David Consunji, 95, Filipino engineer and industrialist.
- Mountaga Diallo, 74–75, Senegalese diplomat and army officer, Force Commander of MONUSCO (2000–2004), Ambassador to Russia (since 2005).
- Ford M. Fraker, 68, American diplomat.
- Bob Kehoe, 89, American soccer player.
- Jomde Kena, 49, Indian politician.
- John Wilson Lewis, 86, American political scientist.
- Earl Lindo, 64, Jamaican reggae musician (Bob Marley and the Wailers).
- Lev Lipatov, 77, Russian nuclear and particle physicist.
- Akiyoshi Matsuoka, 72, Japanese Olympic cross-country skier.
- Abdullah Maute, Filipino Islamist militant (Maute group), airstrike. (death announced on this date)
- Les McDonald, 84, British-Canadian triathlon competitor and administrator.
- Harry Meshel, 93, American politician, member of the Ohio Senate (1970–1993).
- Gastone Moschin, 88, Italian actor (The Godfather Part II, Caliber 9, My Friends), cardiomyopathy.
- José Trinidad Sepúlveda Ruiz-Velasco, 96, Mexican Roman Catholic prelate, Bishop of Tuxtla (1965–1988) and San Juan de los Lagos (1988–1999), respiratory complications.

=== 5 ===
- Eloísa Álvarez, 61, Spanish politician, Mayor of Soria (1999–2003), Deputy (2004–2011) and Senator for Soria (2011–2015).
- Nicolaas Bloembergen, 97, Dutch-American physicist, Nobel Prize laureate (1981).
- Frank Buckiewicz, 87, American football player and coach.
- Holger Czukay, 79, German musician (Can).
- Janice Gardner, 79, American politician, member of the New Hampshire House of Representatives (2012–2016).
- Cedric Hassall, 97, New Zealand chemist.
- Andreas Howaldt, 92, German Olympic sailor.
- Robert Jenson, 87, American theologian.
- Mike Lair, 71, American politician, member of the Missouri House of Representatives (2009–2016), heart disease.
- Gauri Lankesh, 55, Indian journalist and political activist, shot.
- Ma Kwang-soo, 66, South Korean author.
- Gina Mason, 57, American politician, member of the Maine House of Representatives (since 2017).
- Arno Rink, 76, German painter.
- Hansford Rowe, 93, American actor (Three Days of the Condor, Dante's Peak, The Bonfire of the Vanities), traffic collision.
- Bo Södersten, 86, Swedish professor and politician, MP (1979–1988).
- Sir Terence Streeton, 87, British diplomat, High Commissioner to Bangladesh (1983–1989).
- Tom Wright, 93, American baseball player (Chicago White Sox, Boston Red Sox).

=== 6 ===
- Derek Bourgeois, 75, English composer, cancer.
- Sir Robert Bruce-Gardner, 74, British art conservator.
- Carlo Caffarra, 79, Italian Roman Catholic cardinal, Archbishop of Ferrara–Comacchio (1995–2003) and Bologna (2003–2015).
- Raúl Castañeda, 34, Mexican Olympic boxer (2004), shot.
- Daniel Federman, 89, American medical researcher.
- Walter Guralnick, 100, American dentist.
- Rosa Judge, 97, Maltese musician.
- Fulton Lewis III, 81, American journalist.
- Peter Luck, 73, Australian journalist and television presenter (This Day Tonight), Parkinson's disease.
- Nicolae Lupescu, 76, Romanian football player (Rapid București, Admira Wacker Wien, national team) and manager.
- Şerif Mardin, 90, Turkish sociologist.
- Jim McDaniels, 69, American basketball player (Seattle SuperSonics, Los Angeles Lakers, Buffalo Braves), complications from diabetes.
- Eleanore Mikus, 90, American artist.
- Kate Millett, 82, American feminist writer (Sexual Politics), cardiac arrest.
- Mike Neville, 80, British television presenter (BBC North East and Cumbria, ITV Tyne Tees), cancer.
- Noel Picard, 78, Canadian ice hockey player (Montreal Canadiens, St. Louis Blues, Atlanta Flames).
- Solomon Shulman, 81, Belarusian writer and film director.
- Dimitris Varos, 68, Greek journalist and poet.
- Hugo Wathne, 84, Norwegian sculptor.
- Roy Williams, 80, American football player (San Francisco 49ers).
- Lotfi A. Zadeh, 96, Azerbaijani-born American mathematician, innovator of fuzzy mathematics.

=== 7 ===
- Türkân Akyol, 88, Turkish politician, physician and academic, Minister of Health and Social Security (1971) and rector of University of Ankara (1980–1982).
- Jeremiah Goodman, 94, American illustrator.
- Terence Harvey, 72, British actor (Hollyoaks, From Hell, The Phantom of the Opera).
- Mike Hicks, 80, British politician, General Secretary of the Communist Party (1988–1998).
- Tsunenori Kawai, 80, Japanese politician, member of the House of Councillors (since 2004).
- Kim Ki-duk, 82, South Korean film director (Five Marines) and professor (Seoul Institute of the Arts), lung cancer.
- Mark P. Mahon, 87, American politician, member of the Minnesota House of Representatives (1993–1998).
- Gene Michael, 79, American baseball player, manager and executive (New York Yankees), World Series winner (1978), heart attack.
- Charles Owens, 85, American golfer.
- Jeanne Robert, 103, French WWII resistance member.
- Roger Gordon Strand, 83, American federal judge, U.S. District Court for the District of Arizona (1985–2000).
- Tomás Villanueva, 64, Spanish politician, Vice President of Castile and León region (2001–2003), heart attack.
- Duncan Watt, 74, Zambian-born Singaporean broadcaster and author.

=== 8 ===
- Ann Bagnall, 90, British cookbook publisher.
- Lawrence Bartell, 84, American physical chemist.
- Pierre Bergé, 86, French businessman, co-founder of Yves Saint Laurent, myopathy.
- Cory Cadden, 48, Canadian ice hockey player (Knoxville Cherokees).
- Parzival Copes, 93, Canadian economist.
- Isabelle Daniels, 80, American sprinter, Olympic bronze medalist (1956).
- A. Joseph DeNucci, 78, American boxer and politician, Massachusetts State Auditor (1987–2011), complications from Alzheimer's disease.
- Douglas Fitzgerald Dowd, 97, American political economist and activist.
- Kevin Dynon, 92, Australian football player (North Melbourne).
- Troy Gentry, 50, American country singer (Montgomery Gentry), helicopter crash.
- Blake Heron, 35, American actor (Shiloh, We Were Soldiers, Nick Freno: Licensed Teacher), accidental fentanyl overdose.
- Connie Johnson, 40, Australian cancer research fundraiser, breast cancer.
- Harry M. Kuitert, 92, Dutch theologian (Reformed Churches in the Netherlands).
- Catherine Hardy Lavender, 87, American sprinter, Olympic gold medalist (1952).
- Daniel McNeill, 70, American politician, member of the Pennsylvania House of Representatives (since 2013).
- Toshihiko Nakajima, 55, Japanese voice actor (Cowboy Bebop, Inuyasha, Mobile Suit Gundam).
- Jerry Pournelle, 84, American science fiction author (CoDominium) and journalist (Byte).
- Karl Ravens, 90, German politician, Federal Minister of Regional Planning, Construction and Urban Development (1974–1978).
- Humberto Rosa, 85, Argentine-Italian football player.
- Ljubiša Samardžić, 80, Serbian actor (Vruć vetar) and director.
- Ed Smith, 76, Canadian writer.
- José Antonio Souto, 78, Spanish jurist, academic and politician, Mayor of Santiago de Compostela (1979–1981).
- R. N. Sudarshan, 78, Indian actor (Super), kidney disease.
- Don Williams, 78, American Hall of Fame country music singer ("Tulsa Time", "I Believe in You", "You're My Best Friend") and songwriter, emphysema.

=== 9 ===
- Frank Aarebrot, 70, Norwegian political scientist, complications following a heart attack.
- Gretta Chambers, 90, Canadian journalist (Montreal Gazette) and Chancellor of McGill University (1991–1999).
- Velasio de Paolis, 81, Italian Roman Catholic cardinal, President of the Prefecture for the Economic Affairs of the Holy See (2008–2011), cancer.
- Jim Donohue, 79, American baseball player (Los Angeles Angels).
- Michael Friedman, 41, American composer and lyricist (Bloody Bloody Andrew Jackson), complications from AIDS.
- Sir Pat Goodman, 88, New Zealand businessman (Goodman Fielder).
- Mohi Din Hamaky, 88, Egyptian Olympic boxer (1952).
- Mike Hodge, 70, American actor (Law & Order, All My Children, Striking Distance) and union executive (SAG-AFTRA).
- Oscar E. Huber, 100, American politician, member of the South Dakota House of Representatives (1961–1972).
- Kenneka Jenkins, 19, American teenager, hypothermia.
- Jack Mashburn, 89, American politician.
- Geoffrey Maynard, 95, British economist.
- Otto Meitinger, 90, German architect and preservationist, president of the Technical University of Munich (1987–1995).
- Dionisia Mijoba, 79, Venezuelan politician, cardiac arrest.
- Harold Nutter, 93, Canadian Anglican prelate, Metropolitan of Canada (1980–1989).
- Clancy Osborne, 82, American football player (San Francisco 49ers, Minnesota Vikings, Oakland Raiders).
- Pierre Pilote, 85, Canadian ice hockey player (Chicago Blackhawks).
- Doug Sewell, 87, English golfer.
- Wang Hairong, 78, Chinese politician.

=== 10 ===
- Hans Alfredson, 86, Swedish actor (The Apple War), film director (The Simple-Minded Murderer), writer and comedian (Hasse & Tage).
- Xavier Atencio, 98, American animator, lyricist and Imagineer (Pirates of the Caribbean, Haunted Mansion).
- Stephen Begley, 42, Scottish rugby union player (Glasgow Warriors).
- Luigi Maria Burruano, 68, Italian actor (One Hundred Steps, The Return of Cagliostro, Baarìa), cancer.
- Jim Channon, 78, American lieutenant colonel.
- Mel Didier, 90, American baseball scout (Toronto Blue Jays, Montreal Expos) and coach (Southwestern Louisiana Ragin' Cajuns).
- Nancy Dupree, 89, American historian (modern Afghanistan).
- E Thi, 47, Burmese fortune teller.
- Sir David Ford, 82, British government official, Chief Secretary of Hong Kong (1986–1993).
- Kenneth I. Gross, 78, American mathematician.
- Harry Landers, 96, American actor (Ben Casey).
- René Laurentin, 99, French theologian.
- Leila Mardanshina, 90, Russian oil and gas operator.
- Kate Murtagh, 96, American actress (Breakfast at Tiffany's, Doctor Detroit, The Twilight Zone).
- James Morwood, 73, English classical scholar.
- Don Ohlmeyer, 72, American entertainment executive (NBC, NBC Sports, ABC Sports), cancer.
- Jean Pruitt, 77, American charity worker.
- Konstantins Pupurs, 53, Latvian political scientist.
- B. V. Radha, 69, Indian actress (Thazhampoo), heart attack.
- Rommel Sandoval, 38, Filipino Army officer, shot during Battle in Marawi.
- Courtenay Slater, 84, American economist.
- Giorgio Sobrero, 87, Italian Olympic sprinter.
- Grigoris Varfis, 90, Greek politician, MEP (1984–1985) and Commissioner for Regional Policy (1985–1989).
- Gerald Willet, 82, American politician, member of the Minnesota Senate (1971–1988).
- Len Wein, 69, American comic book writer and editor (X-Men, Swamp Thing, Watchmen), co-creator of Wolverine.
- Bob Williams, 86, Canadian Olympic rower.

=== 11 ===
- Abdul Halim of Kedah, 89, Malaysian sultan, Yang di-Pertuan Agong (1970–1975, 2011–2016), Sultan of Kedah (since 1958).
- Jan Brittin, 58, English cricketer, cancer.
- Alfonso Caycedo, 84, Colombian medical hypnotist.
- Dan Currie, 82, American football player (Green Bay Packers).
- J. P. Donleavy, 91, Irish-American novelist and playwright (The Ginger Man, A Fairy Tale of New York).
- Alfred Gadenne, 71, Belgian politician, mayor of Mouscron (since 2006), slit throat.
- Sir Peter Hall, 86, British theatre, opera and film director, director of the National Theatre (1973–1988), dementia.
- Virgil Howe, 41, British drummer (Little Barrie).
- Bruce Laming, 79, Australian politician, member of the Queensland Legislative Assembly for Mooloolah (1992–2001), dementia.
- Mark LaMura, 68, American actor (All My Children, Something Borrowed, City by the Sea), lung cancer.
- James Madison Lee, 90, American lieutenant general.
- Fritz Luty, 88–89, American physicist.
- Alberto Pagani, 79, Italian Grand Prix motorcycle road racer (Honda, MV Agusta).
- Nicholas P. Papadakos, 92, American judge.
- Jeff Parker, 53, American ice hockey player (Buffalo Sabres), heart and lung infections.
- Arnold Sagalyn, 99, American journalist (Northern Virginia Sun).
- António Francisco dos Santos, 69, Portuguese Roman Catholic prelate, Bishop of Aveiro (2006–2014) and Porto (since 2014), heart attack.
- Malcolm Templeton, 93, New Zealand diplomat, Permanent Representative to the United Nations (1973–1978).

=== 12 ===
- Frank Capp, 86, American jazz drummer.
- John Chambers, 86, Australian cricketer.
- Heiner Geißler, 87, German politician, Secretary General of the CDU (1977–1989), Federal Minister of Youth, Family and Health (1982–1985).
- Alex Hawkins, 80, American football player (Baltimore Colts).
- Syd Hoare, 78, English Olympic judoka.
- Charles F. Knight, 81, American businessman (Emerson Electric), complications from Alzheimer's disease.
- Siegfried Köhler, 94, German conductor (Hessisches Staatstheater Wiesbaden, Royal Swedish Opera).
- Allan MacEachen, 96, Canadian politician, Deputy Prime Minister (1977–1979, 1980–1984), MP for Inverness—Richmond (1953–1958, 1962–1968) and Cape Breton Highlands—Canso (1968–1984).
- Bert McCann, 84, Scottish footballer (Motherwell, national team).
- Nicoletta Panni, 84, Italian opera singer.
- Tudor Petruș, 67, Romanian Olympic fencer.
- Luther Saxon, 101, American tenor.
- Xohana Torres, 85, Spanish Galician language writer, poet, narrator and playwright.
- Gary I. Wadler, 78, American physician, multiple system atrophy.
- Edith Windsor, 88, American mathematician and activist, lead plaintiff in United States v. Windsor.

=== 13 ===
- Basi, 37, Chinese panda, world's oldest living, cirrhosis and renal failure.
- Tom Beckert, 90, American sound engineer (The Deep, The Witches of Eastwick, Conan the Barbarian).
- David Bey, 60, American boxer, struck by steel sheet.
- Peter Birch, 65, British actor (Casualty, The House of Eliott), esophageal cancer.
- Pete Domenici, 85, American politician, member of the U.S. Senate for New Mexico (1973–2009), complications from abdominal surgery.
- Per Fugelli, 73, Norwegian author, physician and professor of medicine, colorectal cancer.
- Basil Gogos, 88, American magazine cover illustrator (Famous Monsters of Filmland).
- Slavko Goldstein, 89, Croatian journalist, screenwriter (Signal Over the City), publisher and politician.
- Grant Hart, 56, American singer, songwriter ("Turn On the News") and drummer (Hüsker Dü), liver cancer.
- Saby Kamalich, 78, Peruvian film and television actress (Simplemente María).
- Stewart Moss, 79, American actor, writer, and director.
- Gary Otte, 45, American murderer and robber, execution by lethal injection.
- Edwin H. Ragsdale, 87, American politician.
- Kazimierz Ryczan, 78, Polish Roman Catholic prelate, Bishop of Kielce (1993–2014).
- Robert Franz Schmidt, 84, German physiologist.
- Frank Vincent, 80, American actor (The Sopranos, Goodfellas, Raging Bull), complications during heart surgery.
- Derek Wilkinson, 82, English footballer (Sheffield Wednesday).

=== 14 ===
- Wolfgang Bochow, 73, German badminton player.
- Arnold Chan, 50, Canadian politician and lawyer, MP for Scarborough—Agincourt (since 2014), nasopharyngeal carcinoma.
- George Englund, 91, American film producer and director (The Ugly American, Zachariah), fall.
- Michael Freeman, 85, British orthopaedic surgeon.
- Marcel Herriot, 83, French Roman Catholic prelate, Bishop of Verdun (1987–1999) and Soissons (1999–2008).
- Ermalee Hickel, 92, American philanthropist, First Lady of Alaska (1966–1969, 1990–1994).
- Wim Huis, 89, Dutch footballer (Ajax).
- John Humphreys, 85, Australian Olympic fencer (1960, 1964).
- Tommy Irvin, 88, American politician, Georgia Commissioner of Agriculture (1969–2011), member of the Georgia House of Representatives.
- Djibo Leyti Kâ, 69, Senegalese politician, Foreign Minister (1991–1993).
- Ata Kandó, 103, Hungarian-born Dutch photographer.
- Wolfgang Michels, 66, German musician (Percewood's Onagram).
- Jan Niemiec, 76, Polish slalom canoeist (bronze medallist in 1961 World Championship).
- Jack Teele, 87, American football executive.
- Otto Wanz, 74, Austrian professional wrestler (AWA, NJPW) and promoter (CWA).

=== 15 ===
- Arthur Apfel, 94, British figure skater.
- Violet Brown, 117, Jamaican supercentenarian, world's oldest living person.
- Samuel W. Doss Jr., 89, American politician.
- Mary Lindsay Elmendorf, 100, American applied anthropologist.
- Alma Evans-Freke, 85, New Zealand television presenter.
- Frode Granhus, 52, Norwegian author.
- Mircea Ionescu-Quintus, 100, Ukrainian-born Romanian politician, Minister of Justice (1991–1992) and President of the Senate (2000), heart failure.
- Herbert W. Kalmbach, 95, American attorney and banker, figure in the Watergate scandal.
- Wolfgang Klein, 76, German lawyer, football director (Hamburger SV), and Olympic long-jumper (1964).
- Izidoro Kosinski, 85, Brazilian Roman Catholic prelate, Bishop of Três Lagoas (1981–2009).
- Myrna Lamb, 87, American playwright, heart disease.
- Leon Mestel, 90, British astronomer and astrophysicist.
- Albert Moses, 79, Sri Lankan actor.
- Nan Rendong, 72, Chinese astronomer, founder of the Five hundred meter Aperture Spherical Telescope, lung cancer.
- Dwijen Sharma, 88, Bangladeshi naturalist, kidney disease.
- Rex Simpson, 91, New Zealand cricketer.
- Anthony Thomas Smith, 82, British lawyer.
- Albert Speer, 83, German architect (Expo 2000), complications from a fall.
- Harry Dean Stanton, 91, American actor (Paris, Texas, Alien, The Green Mile).
- Juzo Takaoka, 96, Japanese letterpress printer.
- Hans Weinberger, 88, Austrian-born American mathematician.
- Geoff Wragg, 87, British horse trainer (Teenoso, Pentire).

=== 16 ===
- Bautista Álvarez, 84, Spanish Galician nationalist politician, heart attack.
- Gerald Bernbaum, 81, British academic administrator, Vice-Chancellor of Southbank University (1993–2001), cancer.
- Penny Chenery, 95, American racehorse owner and breeder (Secretariat).
- Ted Christopher, 59, American racecar driver (NASCAR Whelen Modified Tour), plane crash.
- Ben Dorcy, 92, American roadie.
- Steve Evans, 59, English rugby league player (Hull FC, Featherstone Rovers).
- Mitchell Flint, 94, American fighter pilot (Navy, 101 Squadron).
- José Florencio Guzmán, 88, Chilean lawyer and politician, Minister of National Defence (1998–1999).
- Nicolaas Jouwe, 93, Papuan politician, vice-president of New Guinea Council (1961–1962).
- Brenda Lewis, 96, American opera soprano and theatre actress.
- Madge Meredith, 96, American actress (Child of Divorce, The Falcon's Adventure).
- Fred Moore, 97, French colonel and politician, MP (1958–1962) and Order of Liberation (2011).
- Nabeel Qureshi, 34, American Christian apologist, stomach cancer.
- Brendan Reilly, 38, Irish Gaelic football player (Louth GAA).
- Marcelo Rezende, 65, Brazilian journalist and television presenter (Linha Direta), pancreatic and liver cancer.
- Petr Šabach, 66, Czech writer (Babičky).
- Bucky Scribner, 57, American football player (Green Bay Packers, Minnesota Vikings), brain cancer.
- Arjan Singh, 98, Indian Air Force marshal, Lieutenant Governor of Delhi (1989–1990), heart attack.
- Sven Oluf Sørensen, 96, Norwegian physicist.
- Elżbieta Wierniuk, 66, Polish Olympic diver.

=== 17 ===
- Bonnie Angelo, 93, American journalist (Time), complications from dementia.
- Steve Baker, 79, American illusionist.
- Eugenio Bersellini, 81, Italian football player and manager (Inter Milan, Sampdoria), pneumonia.
- Cris Bolado, 47, Filipino basketball player (Alaska Milkmen), traffic collision.
- Gerd Bollmann, 69, German politician.
- Mahant Chandnath, 61, Indian politician, MP for Alwar (since 2014), cancer.
- Kirpal Singh Chugh, 84, Indian nephrologist.
- René Drucker Colín, 80, Mexican scientist, researcher and journalist.
- Mary Fairfax, 95, Polish-born Australian philanthropist.
- Suzan Farmer, 75, British actress (The Scarlet Blade, Doctor in Clover, Coronation Street).
- Bill Goodling, 89, American politician, member of the U.S. House of Representatives from Pennsylvania's 19th congressional district (1975–2001).
- Bobby Heenan, 72, American professional wrestler, manager and commentator (WWF, AWA, WCW), organ failure.
- Dave Hilton, 67, American baseball player (San Diego Padres, Tokyo Yakult Swallows).
- Bob Holland, 70, Australian cricketer (New South Wales, national team), brain cancer.
- Jack Israel, 83, American basketball player.
- Per Kleiva, 84, Norwegian painter.
- Marc Klionsky, 90, Belarusian-born American painter.
- Laudir de Oliveira, 77, Brazilian percussionist (Sérgio Mendes, Marcos Valle, Chicago) and producer.
- Lucy Ozarin, 103, American psychiatrist.
- Buster Parnell, 83, Irish jockey.
- Iftikhar Qaisar, 60, Pakistani actor.
- Uwe Storch, 77, German mathematician.
- Mohammed Taslimuddin, 74, Indian politician, MP for Araria (since 2014).
- Anatoly Tkachuk, 80, Ukrainian Olympic rower (1964, 1972).
- Lionel Wilson, 84, South African rugby union player (Western Province, national team).

=== 18 ===
- Ronald E. Carrier, 85, American educator, President of James Madison University (1971–1998).
- Roger Cisneros, 93, American politician, member of the Colorado Senate (1965–1977), carbon monoxide poisoning.
- Rigas Efstathiadis, 85, Greek Olympic pole vaulter.
- Paul E. Gray, 85, American professor, President of MIT (1980–1990), Alzheimer's disease.
- Paul Horner, 38, American fake news writer and comedian, drug overdose.
- Qamar ul Islam, 69, Indian politician, Member of Karnataka Parliament (1978–1983, 1989–1996, 1999–2004, since 2008), heart attack.
- Tony Laffey, 92, New Zealand footballer.
- Chuck Low, 89, American actor (Goodfellas, The Mission, Sleepers).
- Jean Plaskie, 76, Belgian footballer (Anderlecht, national team).
- Afzal Ahsan Randhawa, 80, Pakistani writer.
- Mark Selby, 56, American musician, cancer.
- Zurab Sotkilava, 80, Georgian-Russian footballer (Dinamo Tbilisi) and opera singer, People's Artist of the USSR, pancreatic cancer.
- Sydney Starkie, 91, English cricketer.
- Larry Taylor, 79, American geochemist.
- Pete Turner, 83, American photographer.
- Kenji Watanabe, 48, Japanese Olympic swimmer (1984, 1988, 1992).
- Paul Wilson, 66, Scottish footballer (Celtic, national team).

=== 19 ===
- Sir Brian Barder, 83, British diplomat, High Commissioner to Nigeria (1988–1991) and Australia (1991–1994).
- Christine Butler, 73, British politician, MP for Castle Point (1997–2001), dementia.
- Bernie Casey, 78, American actor (Revenge of the Nerds, Bill & Ted's Excellent Adventure) and football player (San Francisco 49ers).
- Else Marie Christiansen, 96, Norwegian speed skater.
- Anker Hagen, 96, Norwegian Olympic sport shooter.
- Sir John Hunt, 87, British politician, MP for Bromley (1964–1974) and Ravensbourne (1974–1997).
- Leonid Kharitonov, 84, Russian opera singer, soloist of the Alexandrov Ensemble (1953–1972) and People’s Artist of the RSFSR (1986).
- Jake LaMotta, 95, American Hall of Fame boxer and comedian, inspiration for Raging Bull, complications from pneumonia.
- Maurice Lavigne, 86, French cyclist.
- Vasily Melnikov, 74, Soviet Olympic skier.
- Julius Müller, 78, German Olympic racewalker.
- Massimo Natili, 82, Italian racing driver (Formula One).
- John Nicholson, 75, New Zealand racing driver (Formula Atlantic).
- Sigurður Pálsson, 69, Icelandic author, cancer.
- José Salcedo, 68, Spanish film editor (Women on the Verge of a Nervous Breakdown, Nobody Will Speak of Us When We're Dead, All About My Mother), Goya winner (1989, 1996, 2000).
- Johnny Sandlin, 72, American record producer (The Allman Brothers Band), cancer.
- David Shepherd, 86, British artist and conservationist, Parkinson's disease.
- Manuela Sykes, 92, British politician and activist.
- Helen J. Walker, 64, British space scientist.

=== 20 ===
- Greg Antonacci, 70, American television producer (The Royal Family) and actor (The Sopranos, Boardwalk Empire).
- Kenneth N. Beers, 87, American flight surgeon (NASA).
- Santanu Bhowmik, 28, Indian journalist, murdered.
- Ken Dean, 90, English rugby league footballer (Halifax).
- William J. Ely, 105, American army officer.
- Richard Gendall, 93, British linguist and teacher.
- GK, 60, Indian art director (Avvai Shanmughi, Arunachalam, Chandramukhi)
- Mickey Harrington, 82, American baseball player (Philadelphia Phillies).
- Garry Hill, 70, American baseball player (Atlanta Braves).
- Jimmy Magee, 82, Irish sports broadcaster (RTÉ).
- Denny Marcin, 75, American football coach (New York Giants, New York Jets), heart attack.
- Ene Mihkelson, 72, Estonian poet and novelist (Ahasveeruse uni).
- Ed Phillips, 73, American baseball player (Boston Red Sox), cancer.
- Lillian Ross, 99, American journalist (The New Yorker) and author, stroke.
- Oskar Schulz, 93, Austrian Olympic cross country skier (1952, 1956), mineralogist and petrologist.
- Shakila, 82, Indian actress (Aar Paar, C.I.D., Alibaba Aur 40 Chor), heart attack.
- Arne Solli, 79, Norwegian military officer, Chief of Defence (1994–1999).
- Sir Teddy Taylor, 80, British politician, MP for Glasgow Cathcart (1964–1979) and Rochford and Southend East (1980–2005).
- Georgi Varoshkin, 84, Bulgarian Olympic alpine skier.

=== 21 ===
- Edward Allington, 66, British sculptor.
- David Beatson, 72–73, New Zealand broadcaster.
- Liliane Bettencourt, 94, French cosmetics businesswoman (L'Oréal) and socialite, world's richest woman (since 2015).
- Johnny Burke, 77, Canadian country singer.
- Vera Burt, 90, New Zealand cricketer (national team) and field hockey player (national team), coach and administrator.
- Juan Nicolás Callejas Arroyo, 73, Mexican politician, Deputy for Veracruz (1982–1985, 2000–2003, 2009–2012).
- Michael Colborne, 83, British Royal Navy officer and private secretary.
- Warren Druetzler, 88, American Olympic athlete (1952).
- Jerry Hefner, 68, American politician.
- Larry J. McKinney, 73, American federal judge, U.S. District Court for the Southern District of Indiana (1987–2009).
- Maurice Nivat, 79, French computer scientist, co-father of theoretical computer science.
- Evelyn Scott, 81, Australian Indigenous social activist, Chairwoman of the National Council for Aboriginal Reconciliation.
- William G. Stewart, 84, British game show host (Fifteen to One) and television producer.
- Glen Whisby, 45, American basketball player, heart attack.

=== 22 ===
- Mohammed Mahdi Akef, 89, Egyptian religious and political leader, head of the Muslim Brotherhood (2004–2010), cancer.
- Tim Anderson, 91, British pole vaulter.
- Mike Bright, 79, American Olympic volleyball player (1964).
- Mike Carr, 79, English keyboard player.
- Thelma Chalifoux, 88, Canadian Métis teacher and politician, Senator (1997–2004).
- Norman C. Deno, 96, American chemist.
- Dunc Fisher, 90, Canadian ice hockey player (New York Rangers, Hershey Bears, Boston Bruins).
- Gérard Haché, 92, Canadian politician, New Brunswick MLA (1967–1970).
- Vagn Hedeager, 78, footballer
- Paavo Lonkila, 94, Finnish cross-country skier, Olympic champion (1952).
- Bill Michie, 81, British politician, MP for Sheffield Heeley (1983–2001), chest infection.
- Shmuel Moreh, 84, Iraqi-born Israeli writer and Arabic professor (Hebrew University of Jerusalem).
- Harold Pendleton, 93, British music executive and club owner (Marquee Club).
- William L. Reese, 95–96, American philosopher.
- Rick Shaw, 78, American radio disc jockey (WQAM, WAXY, WMXJ).
- Elizete da Silva, 46, Brazilian heptathlete, South American champion (2001, 2005, 2006), traffic collision.
- Ernst Stoll, 90, Swiss Olympic sport shooter.
- Börje Vestlund, 57, Swedish politician, MP (since 2002).
- Sima Wali, 66, Afghan human rights advocate.
- John Worsdale, 68, English footballer (Stoke City, Lincoln City).
- Daniel Yankelovich, 92, American social scientist, kidney failure.
- Stan Zajdel, 90, American football player and coach.

=== 23 ===
- Valery Asapov, 51, Russian army general, blast injury.
- André Ascencio, 78, French footballer (Stade Rennais).
- Charles Bradley, 68, American singer ("Changes"), stomach cancer.
- Loreto Carbonell, 84, Filipino Olympic basketball player (1956), cardiac arrest.
- Dorothy Eck, 93, American politician, member of the Montana Senate (1980–2000).
- Seth Firkins, 36, American audio engineer (Future, Jay-Z, Young Thug).
- Edward Garden, 87, British musicologist and academic.
- Caesar Giovannini, 92, American composer and pianist.
- Ichirō Inaba, 81, Japanese historian, subdural hematoma.
- Harvey Jacobs, 87, American author.
- Simon J. Kistemaker, 87, American theologian.
- Aline Nistad, 63, Norwegian trombonist, cancer.
- Charles Osborne, 89, Australian-born British music writer.
- Elizabeth D. Phillips, 72, American educator and academic administrator, Provost of the University of Florida (1996–1999).
- Samuel H. Young, 94, American politician, member of the U.S. House of Representatives from Illinois's 10th congressional district (1973–1975).

=== 24 ===
- María Julia Alsogaray, 74, Argentine politician, MP for City of Buenos Aires (1985–1991) and Secretary of Natural Resources and Sustainable Development (1991–1999), pancreatic cancer.
- Washington Benavides, 87, Uruguayan poet, professor and musician.
- Barbara Blaine, 61, American founder of SNAP, heart disease.
- Tharald Brøvig Jr., 75, Norwegian shipowner.
- Gisèle Casadesus, 103, French actress (My Afternoons with Margueritte).
- Al Cannava, 93, American football player (Green Bay Packers).
- E.G.D. Cohen, 94, Dutch-American physicist.
- Fiorenzo Crippa, 91, Italian cyclist.
- Norman Dyhrenfurth, 99, Swiss-American mountaineer and filmmaker.
- Greta Fryxell, 90, American marine scientist.
- Jack Good, 86, British producer.
- Albert Innaurato, 70, American playwright.
- Tony Lewis, American politician, member of the West Virginia House of Delegates (2016–2017).
- Kito Lorenc, 79, German writer, stroke.
- Orville Lynn Majors, 56, American serial killer, heart failure.
- Manuel da Silva Martins, 90, Portuguese Roman Catholic prelate, Bishop of Setúbal (1975–1998).
- Joseph M. McDade, 85, American politician, member of the U.S. House of Representatives for Pennsylvania's 10th congressional district (1963–1999).
- Robert J. McFarlin, 87, American politician, member of the Minnesota House of Representatives (1967–1970; 1973–1974).
- Kit Reed, 85, American science fiction and mystery writer, brain tumor.
- Alexander Stoffel, 88, Swiss Olympic equestrian.
- Carlos Vidal Layseca, 85, Peruvian doctor, Minister of Health (1990–1991) and Rector of Cayetano Heredia University (1994–1999).

=== 25 ===
- Junichi Arai, 85, Japanese textile artist.
- Joe Bailon, 94, American car customizer, creator of candy apple red color.
- M. Cherif Bassiouni, 79, Egyptian lawyer and human rights activist, multiple myeloma.
- Richard Beckler, 77, American attorney.
- Barbara Bell, 95, American astronomer.
- Tony Booth, 85, British actor (Till Death Us Do Part, Coronation Street, The Contender).
- Nora Marks Dauenhauer, 90, American Tlingit author, poet, and scholar.
- Liz Dawn, 77, British actress (Coronation Street, Crown Court, The Wheeltappers and Shunters Social Club), emphysema.
- Eman Ahmed Abd El Aty, 37, Egyptian woman, world's heaviest, kidney failure and intestinal shock.
- Helga Grebing, 87, German historian.
- Anatoly Gromyko, 85, Russian scientist and diplomat.
- Mathew Hu Xiande, 83, Chinese clandestine Roman Catholic prelate, Coadjutor Bishop (2000–2004) and Bishop of Ningbo (since 2004).
- Aneurin Jones, 87, Welsh painter.
- Homer Kandaras, 88, American politician, member of the South Dakota Senate (1971–1976).
- Bobby Knutt, 71, British actor and comedian (Coronation Street, Benidorm, Emmerdale), heart attack.
- Peter Lewis, 75, Australian politician, Speaker of the South Australian House of Assembly (2002–2005).
- David Mainse, 81, Canadian televangelist.
- Leonard Mashako Mamba, 66, Congolese politician, Minister of Public Health (1997–2001) and Minister of Higher Education and Universities (2008–2012).
- Joseph M'Bouroukounda, 79, Gabonese Olympic boxer.
- Tom Miller, 70, Canadian ice hockey player (New York Islanders), cancer.
- Grant H. Palmer, 77, American educator and writer (An Insider's View of Mormon Origins), cancer.
- Clarence Purfeerst, 90, American politician, member of the Minnesota Senate (1971–1991).
- Tim Quill, 54, American actor (Hamburger Hill, Argo, JAG), cancer.
- Folke Rabe, 81, Swedish composer.
- Charles Roff, 65, Scottish photographer.
- Arun Sadhu, 76, Indian writer (Sinhasan), cardiomyopathy.
- Joe Schaffer, 79, American football player (Buffalo Bills), progressive aphasia.
- Freddy Shepherd, 76, English businessman, Chairman of Newcastle United (1997–2007).
- Joseph W. Schmitt, 101, American spacesuit technician.
- Yoshitomo Tokugawa, 67, Japanese writer, head of the Tokugawa Yoshinobu-ke (since 1993).
- Jan Tříska, 80, Czech actor (Andersonville, 2010, The People vs. Larry Flynt), fall.
- Jim Walrod, 56, American interior design consultant.
- Elaine Hoffman Watts, 85, American drummer.

=== 26 ===
- Mehmet Aksoy, 32, British filmmaker, shot.
- Anthony Allom, 78, English cricketer (Surrey).
- Samuel Amirtham, 85, Indian Anglican prelate and theologian, Bishop of South Kerala (1990–1997).
- Dominador Aytona, 99, Filipino politician, Senator (1965–1971).
- Mario Bedogni, 93, Italian Olympic ice hockey player (1948, 1956).
- Ludmila Belousova, 81, Russian pair skater, Olympic champion (1964, 1968).
- Richard Boucher, 85, French footballer (Toulouse).
- Donnie Corker, 65, American transvestite entertainer.
- Sir James Craig, 93, British diplomat, Ambassador to Syria (1976–1979) and Saudi Arabia (1979–1984).
- Robert Delpire, 91, French photographer, publisher and filmmaker.
- Barry Dennen, 79, American actor (Jesus Christ Superstar, The Shining, The Dark Crystal), complications from a fall.
- Květa Fialová, 88, Czech actress (Lemonade Joe, Dinner for Adele, The Phantom of Morrisville).
- Neville Furlong, 49, Irish rugby player (national team), cancer.
- Günter Halm, 95, German World War II military officer.
- Augustine Hoey, 101, English priest.
- Morton Kaplan, 96, American political scientist.
- Fred Ryecraft, 78, English footballer (Brentford F.C.).
- Sigmund Vangsnes, 91, Norwegian educationalist.
- Rinse Zijlstra, 90, Dutch politician, MP (1967–1973), Mayor of Smallingerland (1975–1981), and Senator (1983–1995).

=== 27 ===
- Edmond Abelé, 92, French Roman Catholic prelate, Bishop of Monaco (1972–1980) and Digne (1980–1987).
- K. R. Aravindakshan, 66, Indian politician.
- Dwijen Bandyopadhyay, 68, Indian actor (Jaatishwar), heart attack.
- Raymond Buckland, 83, English Wiccan writer.
- CeDell Davis, 90, American blues musician.
- Joy Fleming, 72, German singer (Eurovision Song Contest 1975).
- Hans Gerschwiler, 96, Swiss figure skater, Olympic silver medalist (1948).
- Sir Richard Greenbury, 81, British businessman, Chairman of Marks and Spencer (1988–1999).
- Jim Harvey, 74, American football player (Oakland Raiders), complications from a fall.
- Hiromi Hayakawa, 34, Japanese-born Mexican actress (El Chema) and singer (La Academia), liver hemorrhage during childbirth.
- Hugh Hefner, 91, American magazine publisher (Playboy), businessman (Playboy Enterprises) and reality television personality (The Girls Next Door), cardiac arrest due to sepsis.
- Anne Jeffreys, 94, American actress (General Hospital, Topper, Dick Tracy).
- Manuel Jiménez, 77, Spanish Olympic archer.
- Vann Johnson, 56, American singer, cancer.
- Ruth Lomon, 87, Canadian composer.
- Red Miller, 89, American football coach (Denver Broncos), complications from a stroke.
- Stanley M. Rumbough Jr., 97, American businessman (Colgate-Palmolive).
- Zuzana Růžičková, 90, Czech harpsichordist, cancer.
- Joel Smoller, 81, American mathematician.
- Antonio Spallino, 92, Italian fencer and politician, Olympic champion (1956) and Mayor of Como (1970–1985).
- Alfred Stepan, 81, American political scientist.

=== 28 ===
- Aleksey Arifullin, 46, Russian footballer (Lokomotiv Moscow).
- Jerry Balmuth, 93, American philosopher.
- Chyung Jinkyu, 77, South Korean writer.
- Makhan Lal Fotedar, 85, Indian politician.
- Balys Gajauskas, 91, Lithuanian politician and prisoner of conscience, member of the Seimas (1990–1992).
- Norman N. Holland, 90, American literary critic.
- Antonio Isasi-Isasmendi, 90, Spanish film director and producer (That Man in Istanbul, The Summertime Killer, They Came to Rob Las Vegas).
- Lee Hsin, 64, Taiwanese politician, member of the National Assembly (1996–1998) and the Taipei City Council (since 1998), suicide by jumping.
- Marietta Marich, 87, American radio personality and actress (Rushmore, The Texas Chainsaw Massacre).
- Donald Mitchell, 92, British musicologist.
- Steven Marshall, 60, British chief executive (Railtrack).
- Vann Molyvann, 90, Cambodian architect (Chaktomuk Conference Hall, Independence Monument, Phnom Penh Olympic Stadium).
- Daniel Pe'er, 74, Israeli television host, complications from a stroke.
- Željko Perušić, 81, Croatian football player and manager.
- Jürgen Roth, 71, German journalist.
- Andreas Schmidt, 53, German actor (Summer in Berlin, The Counterfeiters) and director, cancer.
- Spikeld, 23–24, Norwegian racehorse, euthanized.
- Alan Thompson, 54, British broadcaster (BBC Radio Wales).
- Benjamin Whitrow, 80, British actor (Pride and Prejudice, Chicken Run, Quadrophenia), brain hemorrhage

=== 29 ===
- Abu Tahsin al-Salhi, 63, Iraqi sniper, shot.
- Tom Alter, 67, Indian actor, skin cancer.
- Joep Baartmans-van den Boogaart, 77, Dutch politician.
- Keith Bush, 87, British army officer and intelligence analyst.
- Lorenz Funk, 70, German ice hockey player and manager (EC Bad Tölz, BSC Preussen), Olympic bronze medalist (1976), cancer.
- Merle Gold, 96, American astrophysicist.
- Tim Hackworth, 84, British army officer.
- Rolf Herings, 77, German Olympic javelin thrower (1964, 1968) and football coach (1. FC Köln).
- Wopo Holup, 80, American artist.
- Annette Johnson, 89, New Zealand Olympic alpine skier.
- Tore Lindbekk, 84, Norwegian sociologist and politician.
- Philippe Médard, 58, French handball player, Olympic bronze medalist (1992).
- Wiesław Michnikowski, 95, Polish actor.
- Anthony Leopold Raymond Peiris, 85, Sri Lankan Roman Catholic prelate, Bishop of Kurunegala (1987–2009).
- Oliver Press, 65, American cancer researcher and physician.
- Magdalena Ribbing, 77, Swedish etiquette expert, writer and journalist, complications from a fall.
- Ryūji Saikachi, 89, Japanese voice actor (Castle in the Sky, Dragon Ball Z, Anne of Green Gables), heart failure.
- Jarvis Scott, 70, American Olympic sprinter (1968).
- Ian Smith, 76, New Zealand rugby union player (Otago, national team).
- Dmitry Smolsky, 80, Belarusian composer and teacher (Belarusian State Conservatory).

=== 30 ===
- Alan K. Adlington, 92, Canadian economist.
- Hortense Aka-Anghui, 83, Ivorian politician and pharmacist, MP (1965–1990), Mayoress of Port-Bouët (since 1980) and Minister of Women's Affairs (1986–1990).
- Apex, 36, British drum and bass music producer, suicide.
- John Arenhold, 86, South African cricketer.
- Elizabeth Baur, 69, American actress (Ironside, Lancer, The Boston Strangler).
- Francis Harold Brown, 73, American geologist.
- Alan Carroll, 84, British RAF officer and engineer.
- Hassan El-Haddad, 60, Egyptian Olympic wrestler.
- Max Haines, 86, Canadian crime columnist and author, progressive supranuclear palsy.
- Monty Hall, 96, Canadian-American game show host (Let's Make a Deal), heart failure.
- Frank Hamblen, 70, American basketball coach (Milwaukee Bucks, Los Angeles Lakers), heart attack.
- Howie Heggedal, 68, Canadian ice hockey player (Los Angeles Sharks).
- Jan Henriksen, 71, Norwegian Olympic cyclist.
- Elmer Louis Hoehn, 101, American politician.
- Donald Malarkey, 96, American soldier (Easy Company), depicted in Band of Brothers.
- Jimmy McDonnell, 90, Irish Gaelic footballer.
- Glen Newey, 56, British political philosopher, boating accident.
- Tom Paley, 89, American folk musician (New Lost City Ramblers).
- Lou Reda, 92, American documentary filmmaker.
- Frank Slay, 87, American songwriter.
- Stig Stenholm, 78, Finnish physicist.
- Seth Stone, 41, American Navy SEAL, parachuting accident.
- Joe Taruc, 70, Filipino news anchor and radio broadcaster (DZRH).
- Gunnar Thoresen, 97, Norwegian footballer (Larvik Turn, national team).
- Joe Tiller, 74, American football coach (University of Wyoming, Purdue University).
- Vladimir Voevodsky, 51, Russian-American mathematician, 2002 Fields medalist, aneurysm.
