= Joep =

Joep (/juːp/) is a Dutch masculine given name, the Limburgian form of Joseph. It is occasionally used as a feminine name. People with this name include:

- Joep Baartmans-van den Boogaart (1939–2017), Dutch female politician
- Joep van Beeck (1930–2011), Dutch author and theologian
- Joep Bertrams (born 1946), Dutch political cartoonist
- Joep Beving (born 1976), Dutch composer and pianist
- Joep Brandes (1920–1988), Dutch football player and coach
- Joep Franssen (1899–1975), Dutch road cyclist
- Joep Franssens (born 1955), Dutch composer
- Joep van 't Hek (born 1954), since 1973 spelled "Youp van 't Hek", Dutch comedian, author, and columnist
- Joep Lange (1954–2014), Dutch AIDS researcher
- Joep Leerssen (born 1955), Dutch comparatist and cultural historian
- Joep van Liefland (born 1966), Dutch conceptual artist
- Joep van Lieshout (born 1963), Dutch artist and sculptor
- Joep de Mol (born 1995), Dutch field hockey player
- Joep Nicolas (1897–1972), Dutch glass painter
- Joep van den Ouweland (born 1984), Dutch footballer
- Joep Packbiers (1875–1957), Dutch archer
- Joep van de Rande (born 1997), Dutch footballer
- Joep Smeele (born 1990), Dutch EDM producer and DJ, half of Sick Individuals
- Joep Straesser (1934–2004), Dutch composer and organist
- Joep Zweegers (born 1992), Dutch footballer

== See also ==
- Joop
