= Wadler =

Wadler is a surname. Notable people with the surname include:

- Gary I. Wadler (1939–2017), American internist with special expertise in the field of drug use in sports
- Joyce Wadler (born 1948), American journalist and writer
- Naomi Wadler (born 2006), American student and activist against gun violence
- Philip Wadler (born 1956), American computer scientist
