= Robert McFarlin =

Robert McFarlin may refer to:

- Robert M. McFarlin (1866–1942), American oilman, cattle rancher and philanthropist
- Robert J. McFarlin (1929–2017), American politician and civil engineer
