= Jin-gyu =

- Hangul: 진규
- RR: Jingyu
- MR: Chin'gyu

Jin-gyu (진규), also spelled Jin-kyu or Chin-gyu, is a Korean given name.

People with this name include:

- Kim Jin-kyu (actor) (1922–1998), South Korean actor, film director, and producer
- Chyung Jinkyu (1939–2017), South Korean writer
- Huh Chin-kyu (born 1940/1941), South Korean businessman, founder of Iljin Group
- Jo Jin-kyu (born 1960), South Korean film director
- Kang Jin-kyu (born 1983), South Korean football midfielder (Korea National League)
- Kim Jin-kyu (footballer, born 1985), South Korean football defender (K League Classic)
- Park Jin-kyu (born 1991), South Korean ice hockey player
- Noh Jin-kyu (born 1992), South Korean short track speed skater
- Tak Jin-kyu (born 1994), South Korean singer, member of Boys24/Unit Red
- Lee Jin-gyu (born 2000), South Korean female ice hockey player
