= Senator Doss =

Senator Doss may refer to:

- J. D. Doss (1861–1927), Mississippi State Senate
- Samuel W. Doss Jr. (1927–2017), Georgia State Senate
