= Death of Kenneka Jenkins =

2017 death of an American teenager

- Jenkins in an undated photograph

- Date: September 9, 2017; 9 years ago
- Venue: Crowne Plaza Chicago O'Hare hotel
- Location: Rosemont, Illinois, U.S.; 41.9769°N 87.8635°W
- Cause: Disputed; ruled accidental
- Deaths: 1 (Kenneka Jenkins)
- Coroner: Cook County Medical Examiner
- Litigation: Wrongful death lawsuit by Jenkins' family against the hotel settled in 2023 for USD $10 million

On September 10, 2017, Kenneka Jenkins, a 19-year-old American from Chicago, Illinois, was found dead inside a latched freezer of the Crowne Plaza Chicago O'Hare hotel in Rosemont, Illinois, after attending a party there the previous day.

The medical examiner's report found Jenkins' death to be accidental. Alcohol and topiramate found in her system were thought to have hastened the effects of hypothermia sustained by Jenkins remaining inside the freezer. While the Rosemont police department did not suspect foul play, they stated that their investigation was incomplete.

Jenkins' family and friends criticized the initial police response, and a lawsuit was subsequently filed against the hotel and others. The lawsuit was settled in 2023 for $10 million.

== Death ==
Kenneka Jenkins was a resident of the West Side of Chicago in the U.S. state of Illinois. Borrowing her mother's car, she left the house at 11:30 p.m. on Friday, September 8, 2017, to attend a private party at the Crowne Plaza Chicago O'Hare hotel in nearby Rosemont. The party, which consisted of Jenkins' friends, took place in Room 926 of the hotel. Jenkins arrived at the hotel at 1:13 a.m. Saturday.

An acquaintance who was present with Jenkins at the party noticed that Jenkins appeared to be swaying back and forth as she embraced him in a hug. Several witnesses reported seeing her drink cognac, but did not see her partake of any marijuana or other drugs. Another witness reported that Jenkins "wasn't acting like her usual self", noting that she would dance a little, but later appeared to be sad and went to go sit down. Her sister spoke with her over the phone for the last time at 1:30 a.m.

Jenkins was briefly seen with others walking through one of the halls in the hotel. Camera footage later surfaced of her staggering, apparently intoxicated, near the front desk at 3:20 a.m. 5 minutes later she was seen leaving an elevator on one of the lower floors. The final footage which captured Jenkins alive was time-stamped 3:32 a.m. It showed her arriving at the kitchen, where she rounded a corner towards the freezer. The freezer door itself was reportedly out of the camera's sight.

About one hour later, Jenkins' friends called her mother, Teresa Martin, from her car. They told her that they could not find Jenkins and had therefore left the party, albeit while in possession of Jenkins' mobile phone. Martin went to the hotel to assist in the search, arriving around 5:30 a.m. Saturday.

Upon reaching the hotel management, she was told that they could not provide access to video footage from the night before until someone reported Jenkins missing to the police. At 7:14 a.m., Martin called the Rosemont Public Safety Department, who informed her that it would be prudent to wait a few more hours before reporting her daughter missing, as often the individual simply turns up on their own.

At 12:46 p.m., Jenkins' older sister Leonore Harris filed a missing persons report with the police, who officially reported Jenkins as missing to hotel management at 1:15 p.m. Family members later characterized the initial police response as lacking in urgency. Martin and Harris returned to the hotel around 6 p.m., whereupon they proceeded to knock on many guests' doors until a hotel employee called 911 to complain.

A first check of camera footage that focused on entrances and exits turned up nothing, but at 10 p.m., police spotted footage of Jenkins stumbling through the hotel. Her whereabouts remained unknown until she was found in the hotel's freezer by an employee at 12:25 a.m. Sunday, and was pronounced dead at 12:48 a.m. She was found lying face down on her side, with one shoe off. There was no sign of trauma other than a small cut on her foot. The temperature inside the freezer was found to be 34 °F (1 °C) approximately two hours after the doors had been left open.

== Investigation ==
The freezer, which was on and working, was described as a walk-in freezer within a walk-in cooler, and was part of an unused kitchen. Lights were apparently turned off in both chambers when she entered them. Questions remained as to why the freezer was turned on, although it was reportedly being leased out to a restaurant using space in the hotel. CNN reported that the motion-detecting security camera footage they received did not show Jenkins actually entering the freezer. However, community activist Andrew Holmes claimed that he was shown police footage of Jenkins entering the freezer alone, with no other persons nearby to assist her.

On October 6, 2017, the Cook County Medical Examiner's Office ruled Jenkins' death an accident. The autopsy report found no illegal drugs in Jenkins' system, but her blood alcohol level was found to be 0.112. Traces of topiramate, a drug used to treat epilepsy and migraine headaches, were found in her system, although she was never prescribed this medication. Topiramate taken together with alcohol can enhance the effects of both, and hasten the onset of hypothermia, the presence of which was confirmed by lesions found in Jenkins' stomach. Brain swelling was also observed, but this condition was not associated with the cause of death. The Rosemont police department issued a statement the same day, saying that while no foul play was suspected, their investigation had not yet been completed.

According to the police report, the credit card that was used to secure the hotel room was fraudulent, and linked to a Chicago-area gang. Although rumors of foul play circulated about the case, officials asserted that none of the allegations were borne out by the evidence. However, Jenkins' friends' stories remained inconsistent as to exactly what had happened after the party. After she went missing, one friend texted another about how Jenkins was drunk and missing. The reply came back, "Find Kenneka", and "I can't believe ya'll lost her." They told Martin that Jenkins had gone downstairs with some people, but they left her alone to go and retrieve a cellphone from one of the hotel rooms.

== Litigation ==
In 2018, the family's attorney, Geoffrey Fieger, filed a $50-million lawsuit against the hotel and others. He displayed photos of a freezer door, showing that it had a lock button from the outside, and suggested someone may have inadvertently locked the freezer door. This was contradicted by the security camera, which recorded no other footage since August 30, nor any after Jenkins' footage. The photo seemed not to be of the actual freezer door, which latched shut but apparently had no lock.

A white circular handle on the inside, which would have enabled a person to exit on their own, appeared to be in good working order. The attorney asserted that the hotel had the means to lock off the kitchen area, as it had a pair of plywood doors with a padlock. The lawsuit was settled in December 2023 for $10 million. Court records showed that the defendants were found to be negligent in properly securing the kitchen area, refraining from shutting down an illegal party, and failing to thoroughly check security camera footage once it had been determined that Jenkins had gone missing.

== See also ==
- Deaths in September 2017
