= Kjell Håkonsen =

Norwegian harness racing coach (1935–2011)

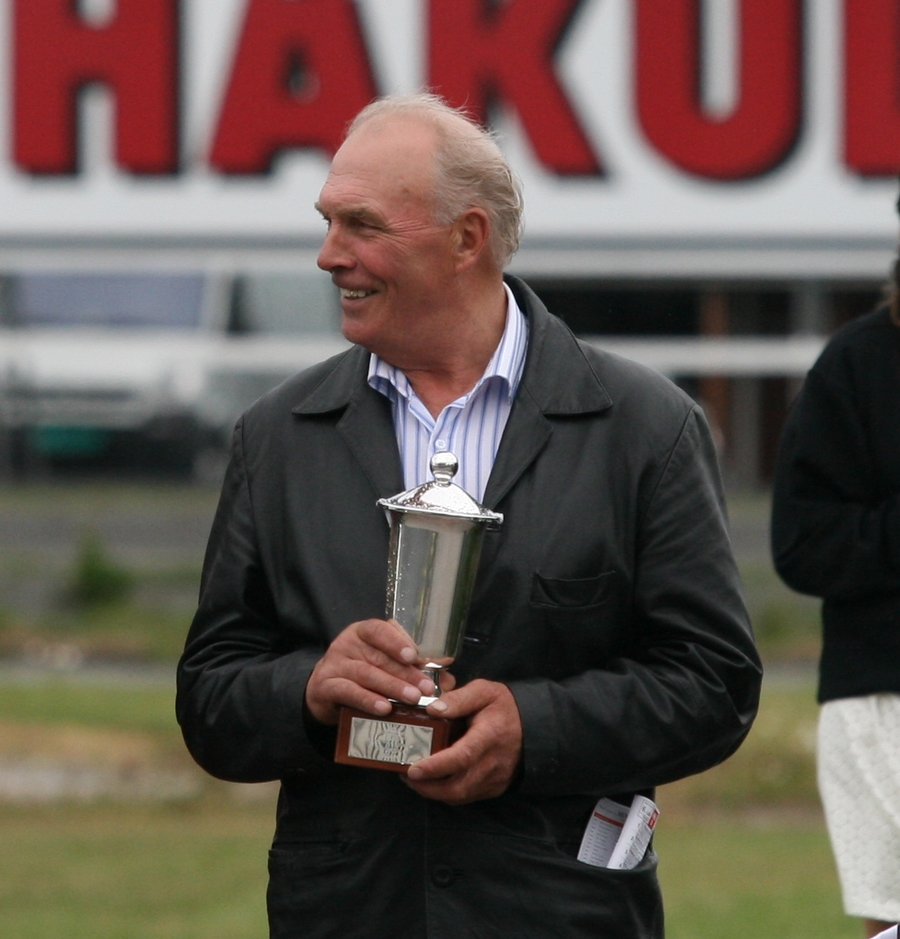
Kjell Håkonsen gives out the prize for the Forus Open in 2008

Kjell Håkonsen (23 December 1935 – 18 April 2011) was a Norwegian harness racing coach and coachman. During his career, he had 5531 starts and won 1094 races. He is best known for having trained and coached Spikeld and Rex Rodney who have achieved many ranks as Norway's best racing horses of all time. He also trained one of Spikeld's sons, Spiker, who is seen as having great potential and is seen as having good breeding stock.
