= Ian Powe =

British Royal Navy officer (1932–2010)

Powe in 1955

Ian Wilton Powe (17 October 1932 – 2 September 2017) was a Royal Navy officer who developed new techniques for tracking submarines during the Cold War. He commanded HMS Yarmouth during the "Cod War".

He was later the director of the Gas Consumers' Council for ten years and served as churchwarden at St Paul's Church, Knightsbridge. There, he was arrested in connection with the alleged blackmail of a homosexual priest, but no charges were filed, and he later received an apology from the authorities, the Metropolitan Police.
