= Jerry Hefner =

American politician

Member of the Oklahoma House of Representatives from the 12th district
- In office November 1988 – November 16, 2004
- Preceded by: Bob Harris
- Succeeded by: Wade Rousselot

Personal details
- Born: July 25, 1949 Wagoner, Oklahoma, U.S.
- Died: September 21, 2017 (aged 68) Tulsa, Oklahoma, U.S.
- Party: Democratic
- Domestic partner: Sandy Garrett (1988-2017)

Military service
- Allegiance: United States
- Branch/service: Oklahoma National Guard
- Rank: Chief Warrant Officer

Jerry Hefner (July 25, 1949 – September 21, 2017) was an American politician who served in the Oklahoma House of Representatives from the 12th district from 1988 to 2004.

== Early life ==
Jerry Hefner was born July 25, 1949, in Wagoner, Oklahoma, to William "Bud" Hefner and Ethel Hefner (maiden name Taff). They owned a radiator shop and the Hefner Block Plant in Wagoner. He attended Wagoner Public Schools and later Northeastern Oklahoma State University and Oklahoma State University. He was a member of Masonic Lodge #98, the Wagoner and Coweta Chambers of Commerce, Rotary Club and the National Rifle Association.

== Career ==
Hefner served as the Oklahoma House of Representatives member from the 12th district from 1988 to 2004. He met his partner, Sandy Garrett, while working in the legislature. He later served as the Wagoner County Commissioner for district 2 from 2004 to 2008, when he retired citing health reasons.

== Death ==
He died on September 21, 2017, in Tulsa, Oklahoma, at age 68.
