= Uwe Storch =

German mathematician

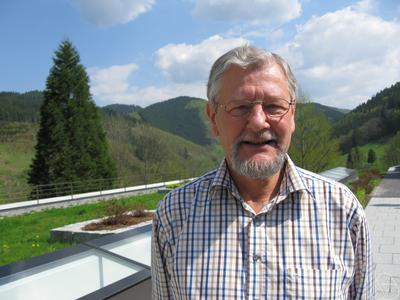
Uwe Storch

Uwe Storch (born 12 July 1940, Leopoldshall– Lanzarote, 17 September 2017) was a German mathematician. His field of research was commutative algebra, and analytic and algebraic geometry, in particular derivations, divisor class group, and resultants.

Storch studied mathematics, physics, and mathematical logic at the University of Münster and Heidelberg University. He got his PhD in 1966 under the supervision of Heinrich Behnke with a thesis on almost (or Q) factorial rings. He did his Habilitation in 1972 in Bochum and became a professor at the University of Osnabrück in 1974. From 1981 to 2006, when he became emeritus, he was a professor for algebra and geometry at Ruhr University Bochum.

He was married and had four sons.

== Theorem of Eisenbud–Evans–Storch ==
The Theorem of Eisenbud-Evans-Storch states that every algebraic variety in n-dimensional affine space is given geometrically (i.e. up to radical) by n polynomials.

== Selected publications ==
Günther Scheja and Uwe Storch, Lehrbuch der Algebra, 2 volumes, Stuttgart 1980 (1st edition was in 3 volumes), 1988.

Uwe Storch and Hartmut Wiebe, Lehrbuch der Mathematik, 4 volumes.
