= Percewood's Onagram =

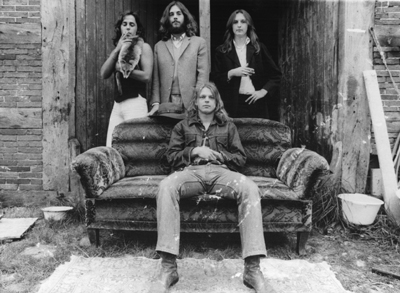

Background information
- Origin: Germany
- Occupation: music band
- Years active: 1969 - 1974
- Labels: Rhino / Warner
- Website: Homepage

Percewood's Onagram (1969–1974) was a German-American band founded by Wolfgang Michels based in Bremen, Germany. The music can be described as psychedelic rock and progressive rock with folk music elements, some call it Krautrock.

== Biography ==
In May 1968 a very young German musician named Michels with the pseudonym "One Plus None" had a #2 BBC London chart hit with "Desert Walker", a song he produced himself, which was topped only by the Rolling Stones at #1. Alexis Korner, “the father of the white blues”, and the man who discovered the Rolling Stones, then invited Michels to London and took him under his wing.

In the early 70's Michels, as singer and guitarist of the psychedelic rock band "Percewood's Onagram", which was the first German indie band, produced four albums with lyrics and music all his own. “Percewood’s Onagram” developed a worldwide cult following. After the band split up, Michels returned to London where he appeared at the Marquee Club, among others. He later moved to San Francisco and, as the first German musician in California/USA, recorded two solo albums, in collaboration with Neil Young producer & engineer John Nowland, both of which attained a cult following.

As of 2011 Michels is writing and performing songs. He died 2017 09 14..

== Members ==
- Wolfgang Michels - Vocals, Guitar, writer, composer, producer (1967–1974)
- Klaus Kaufmann - Piano, Organ (1967–1974)
- Jojo Ludwig - Drums, Guitar, Bass, Harmony Vocals, Flute, Percussion (1968–1974)
- Eddy Muschketat - Harmonica, Harmony Vocals, Percussion (1968–1974)
- Peter Conant-Schaffer (US) - Lead Guitar (1973–1974)
- Geary Priest (US) - Drums (1973–1974)
- Gerald Heinemann - Harmony Vocals, Percussion (1973–1974)
- Uwe "Bass" Meyer - Bass (1974)

== Discography ==
- Percewood’s Onagram (First Album), LP 1969, as CD re-released by Warner Music 2011 +
- Lessons for Virgins, LP 1971, as CD re-released by Warner Music 2011 +
- Tropical Brainforest, LP 1972, as CD re-released by Warner Music 2011 +
- Ameurope, LP 1974, as CD re-released by Warner Music 2011 +

+ Digital remastered, with unreleased bonus-tracks and alternative-versions

All albums by Percewood’s Onagram and Wolfgang Michels were released in October 2011 in the USA, Canada & South America by Rhino / Warner Music USA.
