= Oscar E. Huber =

American politician

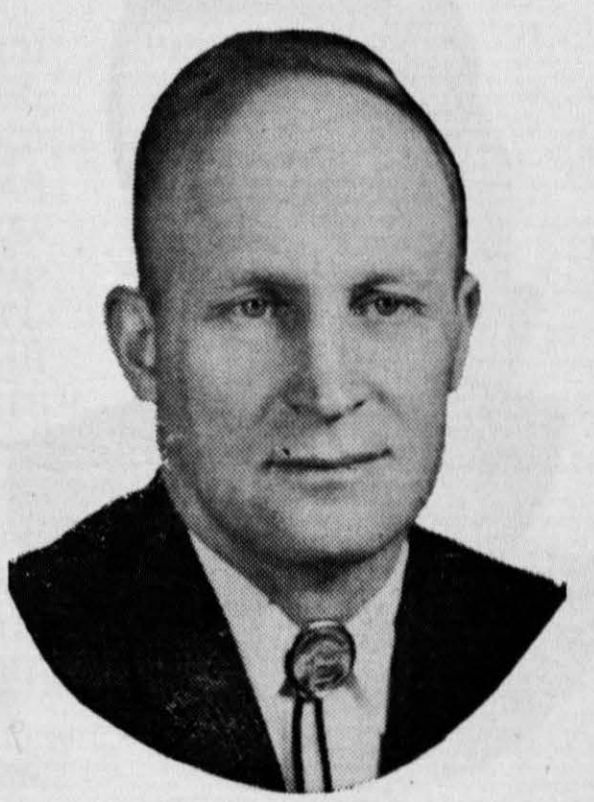

Member of the South Dakota House of Representatives
- In office 1961–1972

Personal details
- Born: August 22, 1917 Edmunds County, South Dakota
- Died: September 9, 2017 (aged 100) Bowdle, South Dakota
- Party: Republican
- Profession: farmer, rancher

Oscar Edwin Huber (August 22, 1917 – September 9, 2017) was an American politician in the state of South Dakota. He was a member of the South Dakota House of Representatives from 1961 to 1972. He is an alumnus of Northern State University and the University of Minnesota. Huber was a farmer/rancher and resided in Bowdle, South Dakota. He died at the age of 100 on September 9, 2017.
