= Oliver Press =

American cancer researcher (1952–2017)

- Born: September 10, 1952; St. Louis, Missouri, United States
- Died: September 29, 2017 (aged 65); Seattle, Washington, US
- Education: Stanford University (BS, 1973); University of Washington (PhD,1977); University of Washington School of Medicine (MD,1979)
- Scientific career
- Workplaces: Fred Hutchison Cancer Research Center; University of Washington

Oliver "Ollie" W. Press (September 10, 1952 – September 29, 2017) was an American cancer researcher and physician. Press was best known for his contributions to the development of targeted cancer therapies for blood cancers.

== Biography ==
Press was born in St. Louis, Missouri. Press described being passionate about zoology as a child, and frequently captured snakes and frogs from the parks near his home. After majoring in biology at Stanford University, Press decided to study medicine, both as a means to apply the study of biology to help people and as a means to secure draft deferment from the Vietnam War. Press earned both a medical doctorate and PhD through the University of Washington Medical Scientist Training Program. Press completed internship and residency at Mass General Hospital in 1982 before returning to the University of Washington to serve as chief resident and pursue a fellowship in oncology. In 1986, he joined as faculty at the University of Washington, where he eventually became a professor of medicine and adjunct professor of bioengineering, and as a member of the Fred Hutchison Cancer Research Center.

Press met his future wife, Nancy, through a study-abroad program as an undergraduate. Nancy worked in Press's lab and oversaw administrative work throughout his career.

== Career ==
Press conducted translational research to develop more effective therapies for lymphoma. Press pioneered the use of anti-CD20 antibodies as a monoclonal antibody therapy for lymphoma. He was instrumental in the subsequent development of lymphoma radioimmunotherapy and the eventual FDA approval of Ibritumomab tiuxetan. Throughout his career, Press continued to advance and refine such therapies in order to increase their clinical usage, including the early application of CAR T cells for the treatment of lymphoma.

In addition to his clinical service and research achievements, Press was well-regarded as a mentor. He directly trained more than 70 physicians and scientists over the course of his career, and served as associate director of the University of Washington Medical Scientist Training program from 2014-2017.

== Awards ==
- Oliver W. Press Distinguished MSTP Alumnus Award
- Research Visionary Champion Award from the Washington/Alaska chapter of the Leukemia & Lymphoma Society
- Gold Award for Achievement in Medical Research from Seattle Business Magazine; and several awards from the Lymphoma Research Foundation, including the organization's
- Distinguished Service Award, Lymphoma Research Foundation
- SAAS Foundation for Medical Research's John Ultmann Award for Contributions to Lymphoma Research (posthumous)
- American Society of Hematology's 2017 Mentor Award (posthumous)
- Excellence in Mentorship Award, UW Department of Medicine
  - Sources:
