= Vagn Hedeager =

Danish footballer

Personal information
- Date of birth: 21 August 1939
- Date of death: 22 September 2017 (aged 78)

International career
Years	Team	Apps	(Gls)
1967	Denmark	1	(0)

Vagn Hedeager (21 August 1939 – 22 September 2017) was a Danish footballer. He played in one match for the Denmark national football team in 1967.
