= Joep Zweegers =

Dutch footballer

Personal information
- Full name: Joep Zweegers
- Date of birth: 25 August 1992 (age 34)
- Place of birth: Geldrop, Netherlands
- Height: 1.84 m (6 ft 0 in)
- Position: Right back

Team information
- Current team: Esperanza Neerpelt

Youth career
- 2010–2011: Helmond Sport

Senior career*
Years	Team	Apps	(Gls)
2011–2014	FC Eindhoven	22	(0)
- * Club domestic league appearances and goals as of 2 June 2014 (UTC)

Joep Zweegers (born 25 August 1992) is a Dutch footballer who plays for Belgian side Esperanza Neerpelt.

== Career ==
Zweegers joined Helmond Sport at the age of 18 on a one-year deal to go through the ranks but when his contract expired he decided to join FC Eindhoven on a-three year deal in July 2011.

== FC Eindhoven ==
Zweegers debut came 8 months later coming on as a 90th-minute substitute in a 3–1 away win against Go Ahead Eagles. He played 6 league games in his first season playing for FC Eindhoven. In his second season, he started the second match of the season which ended in a 2-1 for FC Eindhoven, his second game of the season came three months later in a 3–0 away loss against FC Dordrecht. In his second season, he played 12 games taking his total to 18 games in 2 years. In the 2013/14 season, Zweegers entered the last 12 months of his contract. He has currently played four games this season that takes his total to 22 league games in almost three years. In the January 2014, he left FC Eindhoven after having no prospect of playing in the first team. He signed with Belgian side Esperanza Neerpelt.
