= Sergio González (sailor) =

Mexican sailor (1925–2017)

Sergio González Karg (3 July 1925 – 3 September 2017) was a Mexican sailor who competed in the 1964 Summer Olympics.

== Biography ==
Sergio González was born in Mexico City on 3 July 1925. He graduated from National Autonomous University of Mexico and Harvard University. González died in Mexico City on 3 September 2017, at the age of 92.
