= Ichirō Inaba =

Japanese historian (1936–2017)

- Born: May 3, 1936; Osaka, Japan
- Died: September 23, 2017 (aged 81); Ikoma, Nara, Japan

Academic background
- Education: Kyoto University

Ichirō Inaba (稲葉 一郎, Inaba Ichirō; 3 May 1936 – 23 September 2017) was a Japanese historian of China and professor emeritus at Kwansei Gakuin University.

== Career ==
Ichirō Inaba graduated from the Kyoto University Graduate School of Letters in 1966. He studied under Ichisada Miyazaki, and his doctoral thesis was on official historians of the Six Dynasties. Following graduation, he lectured at a university for a year and two months before landing an assistant job at Ritsumeikan University, where he taught Chinese Historical Thought and Pre-Modern Chinese History after 1977. In October 1978, he visited China with a group of historians and archaeologists.

He was promoted to full professor in 1979, and a year later he joined the School of Humanities at Kwansei Gakuin University. He stayed there for over two decades before retiring in 2005.

== Works ==
Inaba's research focused on the historical and economic views of Chinese statesmen, historians and philosophers, including Sang Hongyang, Sima Guang, Mozi, Mencius, Xunzi, Han Fei, Yuan Jue, and Zhang Xuecheng. He wrote a chapter for Chinese Medieval History Research (中国中世史研究, Kyoto University Press, 1970) and contributed several entries to the western reference book A Sung Bibliography (French: Bibliographie des Sung, The Chinese University Press, 1978).

His own books include Chinese Historical Thought: A Study of Jizhuanti (中国の歴史思想―紀伝体考, Sobunsha, 1999) and A Study of the History of Chinese Historiography (中国史学史の研究, Kyoto University Press, 2006), which collected his papers from several decades.

He also authored a travel photography book titled Traveling in Jiangnan: Suzhou, Hangzhou, Shanghai (江南旅情―蘇州・杭州・上海, U-Time, 2005), featuring photos from the Jiangnan region of China.

== Death ==
In 2017, Inaba died from acute subdural hematoma in Ikoma, Nara. He was 81.
