= Courtenay Slater =

American economist

Courtenay Murphy Slater (1933–2017) was an American economist who became Chief Economist in the United States Department of Commerce in the late 1970s, under president Jimmy Carter.

== Early life and education ==
Slater was born in Durham, North Carolina, on July 23, 1933, and moved to Maryland with her family as a child. After attending Montgomery Blair High School in Maryland, she became an undergraduate at Oberlin College. Initially hoping to go into science, she was told by a professor that "women just did not go into physics", and instead graduated with a degree in history in 1955.

She married Whitney Slater, a fellow Oberlin student who came to work for the Naval Research Laboratory and the National Science Foundation. After working as a junior high school teacher for a year, she became a housewife and began what would turn out to be "a twelve-year slog of night school" in graduate study of economics at American University in Washington, D.C. She earned a master's degree there in 1965 and completed her doctorate in 1968.

== Career and later life ==
While a doctoral student, Slater became an intern for the Council of Economic Advisers, and after completing her doctorate she became a senior economist for the council, working on trade and assistance to developing countries. In 1969 she became an economist for the United States Congressional Joint Economic Committee, and was promoted there to senior economist in 1974.

She was named the chief economist for the Department of Commerce, after a nomination in 1977 by president Jimmy Carter. Although she was a strong contender for a nomination to the Federal Reserve Board of Governors in 1978, the post eventually went to Nancy Teeters instead. After Slater left federal service at the end of the Carter administration, she founded and headed consulting firms CEC Associates in 1981, as well as Slater Hall, Inc., and chaired the Council of Professional Associations on Federal Statistics.

She died on September 10, 2017.

== Recognition ==
Slater was elected as a Fellow of the American Statistical Association in 1983.
