= Alan Carroll =

British engineer

- Born: 10 December 1932; U.K.
- Died: 30 September 2017 (aged 84)
- Engineering career
- Awards: Polar Medal

Alan Carroll (10 December 1932 – 30 September 2017) was an engineer and Royal Air Force pilot who became the youngest leader of a British Antarctic base. He was awarded the Polar Medal by Queen Elizabeth in 2008.
