= Jürgen Roth =

German publicist and investigative journalist (1945–2017)

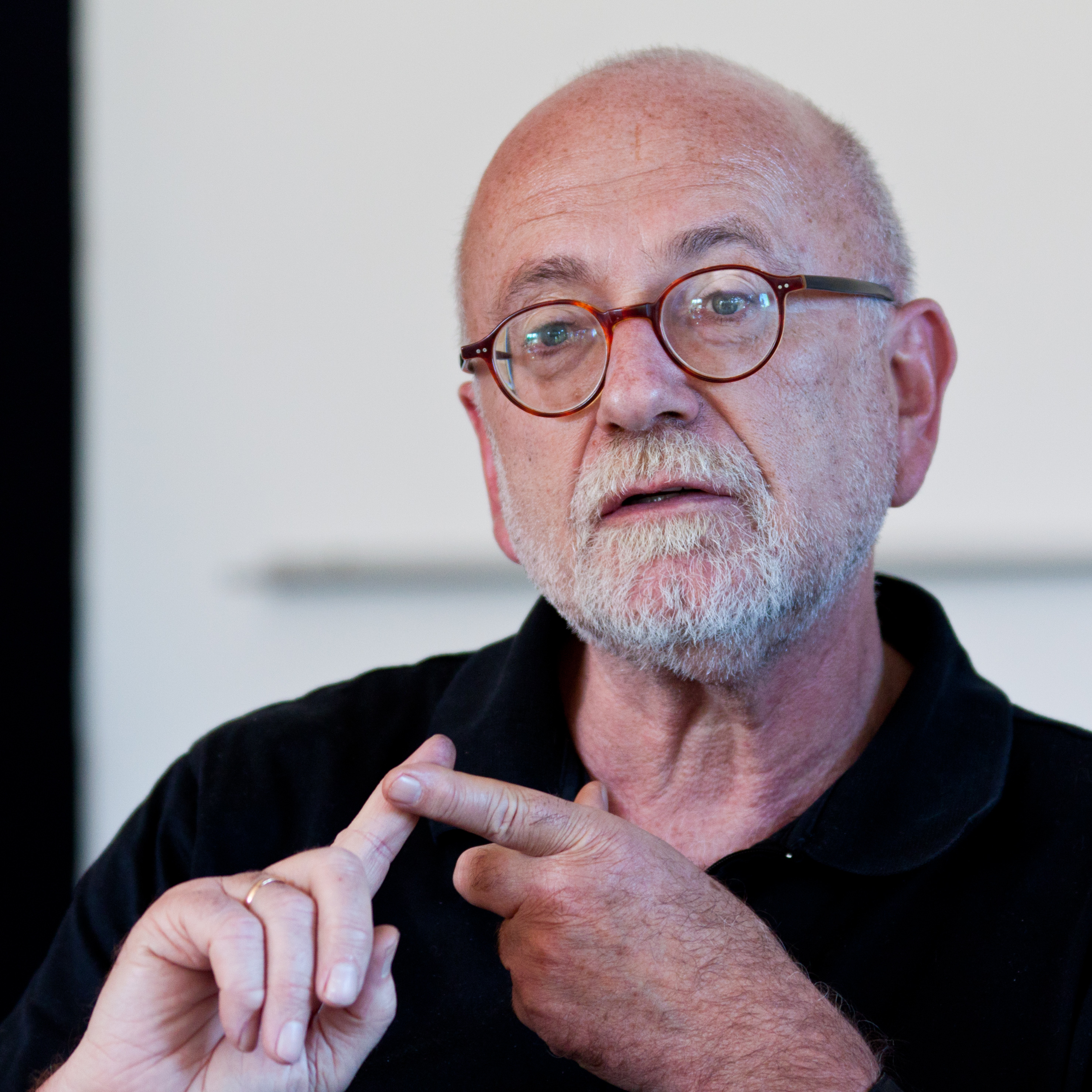
- Roth in 2011
- Born: 4 November 1945; Frankfurt on Main, Germany
- Died: 28 September 2017 (aged 71); Frankfurt on Main, Germany
- Occupations: Publicist, journalist
- Website: juergen-roth.com

Jürgen Roth (4 November 1945 – 28 September 2017) was a German publicist and investigative journalist.

== Life ==
Roth was born in 1945 at Frankfurt am Main.

After completing his secondary school education, Roth completed an apprenticeship as a forwarding agent. In 1968, he left and spent a year in Turkey. From 1971 onwards, he published books and television documentaries on organised crime, with a focus on Eastern Europe, Germany and international terrorism. He was also active in the organisation Business Crime Control. Roth believed that organised crime was deeply intertwined with the economic system and was a part of economic life in Europe.

Roth died after a serious illness in September 2017 at the age of 71.

== Reception and lawsuits ==
The Rheinische Post sees Roth as one of the "best experts on the subject." However, he is considered a "contentious and, because of his polemics, controversial journalist," according to the Berliner Zeitung on July 9, 2009. Thomas Feltes, criminologist at the Ruhr University Bochum, wrote: "Without his books, the average reader would be missing something, and certainly also some investigators who, after their publication, will eagerly search for who is quoted, named or otherwise indirectly mentioned in them."

There were several court cases against Roth because of his publications. Former Chancellor Gerhard Schröder took legal action against his 2006 book The Germany Clan: The Unscrupulous Network of Politicians, Top Managers and the Judiciary. The court ruled that Roth had to rewrite a passage in the book in which he linked a trip by Schröder to the United Arab Emirates with his work for Gazprom. However, Schröder's lawyers also tried to prevent the sale of the new, unobjectionable edition by issuing warnings to booksellers. Roth had previously presented an excerpt of his research activities on the news portal Fair Observer.

Following an interim injunction obtained by the lawyer of a Leipzig restaurateur at the Leipzig Regional Court, the book Mafialand Deutschland had to be withdrawn from bookstores and could only be sold with blacked-out passages.

In February 2010, former Bulgarian Interior Minister Rumen Petkov sued Roth for defamation. Roth had linked Petkov to the mafia and illegal drug trafficking. On 14 October 2010, Roth was acquitted by the Sofia District Court and the defamation charge was dismissed.

From the summer of 2007, Roth wrote about an alleged Saxony swamp over claims that high-ranking politicians, lawyers, police officers and journalists were members of mafia structures. Roth was heavily criticized by the journalist Reiner Burger, who describes the Saxony swamp as a legend, in a series of articles in the Frankfurter Allgemeine Zeitung. Burger also justified the criticism with past lost court cases; according to Burger, Roth was sentenced to pay damages by the Hamburg Regional Court in 2000 for his 1999 book The Grey Eminence and in 1999 for a television report. Burger accused Roth, among other things, of failing to speak directly to the people affected. In this context, Roth had to retract statements on his homepage about a Leipzig businessman. The witness whom Roth had relied on had told untruths and was sentenced to a fine of 4,200 euros by the Dresden District Court in spring 2008. Roth defended himself by saying that he had only not questioned the person directly in one case for a blog entry, and criticized Burger's attacks as "Kafkaesque" because Burger ignored, among other things, that important witnesses were put under pressure in the "Saxony swamp". In 2009, the investigative committee of the Saxon state parliament did not come to a clear conclusion about the "Saxony swamp". The CDU and FDP consider it to be refuted, the Green Party and the Left Party claim to have found no evidence because the investigative committee was largely denied access to the files by the state government. The public prosecutor's office did not investigate further.

Roth wrote in Schmutzige Demokratie, a 2016 compendium of vignettes, for example that a young Hungarian politician who would later rise to international prominence was the victim of kompromat, because he had accepted a considerable bribe from a Russian organized crime figure through an intermediary twenty years earlier. However, Roth and his publisher chose not to expose themselves to a suit of libel.

== Bibliography ==
- 1971: Armut in der Bundesrepublik
- 1972: Ist die Bundesrepublik Deutschland ein Polizeistaat?
- 1973: Partner Türkei oder Foltern für die Freiheit des Westens?
- 1974: Bundeswehr, BGS, Polizei, Hüter der Verfassung?
- 1975: Z.B. Frankfurt, die Zerstörung einer Stadt
- 1977: Aufstand im wilden Kurdistan
- 1978: Geographie der Unterdrückten
- 1981: Die Türkei – Republik unter Wölfen
- 1982: "Es ist halt so ..."
- 1984: Dunkelmänner der Macht
- 1985: Zeitbombe Armut
- 1986: Makler des Todes
- 1987: Rambo
- 1987: Das zensierte Buch: Geschäfte und Verbrechen der Politmafia
- 1988: Die illegalen deutschen Waffengeschäfte und ihre internationalen Verflechtungen
- 1990: Die Mitternachtsregierung
- 1992: Sie töten für Geld
- 1992: Verbrecher-Holding
- 1995: Der Sumpf
- 1996: Die Russen-Mafia
- 1997: Absturz
- 1999: Die Graue Eminenz
- 1999: Die roten Bosse
- 2000: Schmutzige Hände: Wie die westlichen Staaten mit der Drogenmafia kooperieren, Goldmann, ISBN 3442151341
- 2001: Der Oligarch
- 2002: Netzwerke des Terrors
- 2003: Die Gangster aus dem Osten
- 2004: Ermitteln verboten!
- 2005: Gejagt von der Polenmafia, Eichborn, ISBN 3-8218-5589-4
- 2006: Der Deutschland-Clan: Das skrupellose Netzwerk aus Politikern, Top-Managern und Justiz, ISBN 978-3-453-62020-9
- 2007: Anklage unerwünscht: Korruption und Willkür in der deutschen Justiz, Eichborn-Verlag, ISBN 978-3-8218-5667-4
- 2009: Mafialand Deutschland, Eichborn-Verlag, ISBN 978-3821856322
- 2016: Schmutzige Demokratie: Ausgehöhlt – Ausgenutzt – Ausgelöscht?, Ecowin Verlag, ISBN 978-3-7110-0094-1
