= Manuel da Silva Martins =

Portuguese Roman Catholic bishop

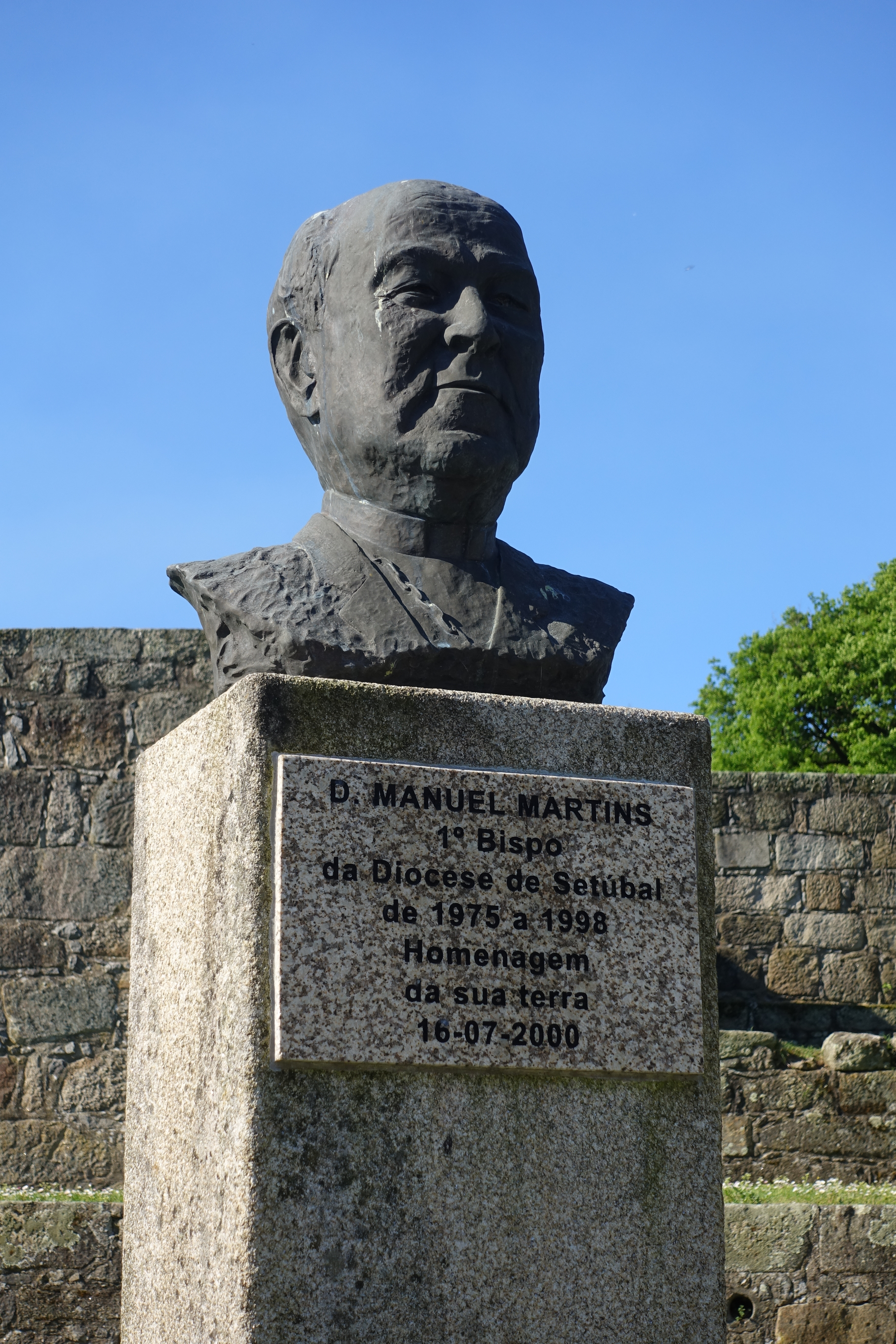
Bust of Manuel Martins in Portugal.

Manuel da Silva Martins (20 January 1927 – 24 September 2017) was a Catholic bishop.

Ordained to the priesthood in 1951, da Silva Martins served as the bishop of the Diocese of Setubal, Portugal from 1975 to 1998.
