= Mario Bedogni =

Italian ice hockey player

- Born: 22 November 1923 Milan, Italy
- Died: 26 September 2017 (aged 93)
- Position: Defence
- Played for: Diavoli Milano
- National team: Italy
- Playing career: 1946–1965

Mario Bedogni (22 November 1923 – 26 September 2017) was an Italian ice hockey player. He competed in the 1948 and 1956 Winter Olympics.

Bedogni died in his hometown of Milan on 26 September 2017, aged 93.
