= Tony Hakaoro =

Cook Islands broadcaster and radio talk show host

Tony Hakaoro (5 January 1964 – 1 September 2017) was a Cook Islands broadcaster and radio talk show host. Hakaoro hosted one of the country's most popular, daily radio talk shows, "Karangaranga," on Radio Cook Islands. He publicly criticized Cook Islands politicians on his shows, which earned him a loyal audience.

Hakaoro died on 1 September 2017, following a stroke and subsequent coma. He was buried in Titikaveka on 7 September 2017. The Office of the Prime Minister issued a statement calling Hakaoro a "formidable warrior."
