= Keith Bush =

British army officer

Keith Edward Bush OBE (7 December 1929 – 29 September 2017) was a British Army artillery officer and Russia analyst.

== Early life ==
Keith Bush was born on 7 December 1929 and educated at Dulwich College and Harvard University.

== Career ==
He worked for Radio Liberty, latterly as research director, from 1963 to 1994.

He was director, Russian and Eurasian program, at the Centre for Strategic and International Studies from 1994 to 2001.

== Selected publications ==
- Average industrial earnings and income tax in the USSR and the West. Radio Liberty Committee, 1966.
- A comparison of retail prices in the United States, the USSR and Western Europe. Radio Liberty Committee, 1967.
- Environmental Disruption: The Soviet Response. Radio Liberty Committee, 1972.
- From the Command Economy to the Market: A Collection of Interviews. Dartmouth, 1991. ISBN 978-1855212305
