= Ma Kwang-soo =

South Korean writer (1951–2017)

- Hangul: 마광수
- Hanja: 馬光洙
- RR: Ma Gwangsu
- MR: Ma Kwangsu

Ma Kwang-soo (Korean: 마광수; 14 April 1951 − 5 September 2017) was a South Korean poet, professor in Korean literature, novelist and essayist. He died in an apparent suicide in September 2017. For most of his life, he taught at Yonsei University. He was imprisoned for eight months, and discharged from his university for six years, for publishing 'sexually explicit' novels in 1995. His novel, Happy Sara (즐거운 사라) was deemed obscene by the Supreme Court and is banned for teenagers. He made his literary debut in 1977, releasing six poems on a monthly basis on the recommendation of poet Park Doo-jin. Later in 1989, he created a sensation for her free sex discussion, including poems, roses, novels, and essays. In particular, his 1991 novel, "Happy Sara," had changed his life forever, creating a heated controversy over obscenity in Korean society. His arrest was a classic cultural event that revealed aspects of the times, including freedom of expression and limits, the emergence of liberalism and the conflict of conservatism in the 1990s. He was dismissed from school in 1995 when the Supreme Court confirmed that he was sentenced to two years in prison and suspended execution. He returned to Yonsei University after receiving a special pardon in 1998, but after being disqualified in 2000, he changed his job. He returned to work in 2003 and retired in August 2016. However, he reportedly suffered from depression after a series of incidents. In 2011, the author published a novel titled A Letter of Crazy Words and Youth of Beautiful Youth.
