= Jack Mashburn =

American politician

Member of the Florida House of Representatives from Bay County
- In office 1953–1954

Personal details
- Born: April 21, 1928
- Died: September 9, 2017 (aged 89)
- Party: Democratic

Jack Mashburn (April 21, 1928 – September 9, 2017), also known as D. D. Mashburn, was an American politician. He served as a Democratic member of the Florida House of Representatives.

== Life and career ==
Mashburn was a chemical technician.

Mashburn served in the Florida House of Representatives from 1953 to 1954.

Mashburn died on September 9, 2017, at the age of 89.
