= Radio Cook Islands =

Cook Islands-based radio station

Radio Cook Islands (630 AM) is a private national Cook Islands radio station. Headquartered in Avarua, the station broadcasts throughout the country, including Rarotonga, the Northern Cook Islands, and the Southern Cook Islands. 80% of its programming is broadcast in Cook Islands Māori, with the remaining 20% in English.

== History ==
In the Cook Islands, there was an experimental radio station in the 1960s, broadcasting for two periods (10:30am to 1pm and 6pm to 10pm) on weekdays. Saturday broadcasts were already being considered.

Radio Cook Islands was established in the 1970s by the Government of the Cook Islands. The station was privatized in 1996, but reverted to government control in December 1998. In March 1999, Elijah Communications, a subsidiary of the Pitt Media Group, acquired the station from the government. Elijah Communications introduced new programming, as well as reformed the station's finances, by 2000.

In 2013, a report on the state of media and communications in the Cook Islands deemed Radio Cook Islands the only radio station with close to national coverage (including all outer islands).

In 2019, the Cook Islands government asked the station to reactivate its backup AM transmitter over concerns that some parts of the country might lack a radio signal during cyclone season.

The late broadcaster Tony Hakaoro hosted the popular afternoon talk show, "Karangaranga," on the station.

== Content ==
Music played on the station features 70% Polynesian Music and 30% English Music. As stated on the official website, the objectives of Radio Cook Islands are: News, Culture, Language, Music, National, and Community.
