= Larry Taylor (geochemist) =

American geochemist and petrologist

- Born: Lawrence August Taylor; September 14, 1938; Paterson, New Jersey, US
- Died: September 18, 2017 (aged 79); Knoxville, Tennessee, US
- Education: University of Indiana in Bloomington
- Known for: Petrology Research
- Spouse: Dong-Hwa (Dawn) Shin (m. 1993–2017)
- Children: 2
- Awards: University of Tennessee Chancellor's Award for Research and Creative Achievement; NASA SSERVI Wargo Award; Honorary Fellow of the Russian Mineralogical Society and Russian Academy of Sciences; 2004 University of Tennessee University Distinguished Professor

Lawrence August Taylor (September 14, 1938 – September 18, 2017) was an American geochemist and petrologist working at the Department of Earth and Planetary Sciences in the University of Tennessee. He is the founder of the UT Planetary Geosciences Institute and was also its director until late 2017.

Taylor was a graduate of the Indiana University at Bloomington, where he obtained a bachelor's degree in chemistry and a master's degree in geology. He would move on to receive a PhD from Lehigh University, perform pre-doctoral experimental petrology research at the Geophysical Laboratory of the Carnegie Institution of Washington, and finally a Fulbright Fellowship at the Max-Planck-Institüt für Kernphysik in Heidelberg, Germany.

In December 1972, Taylor was offered to be in the “back room” of Johnson Space Center during the Apollo 17 mission where he had the opportunity to directly advise astronauts on their extravehicular activities on the Moon. Subsequently, Taylor became very close friends with Harrison Schmitt, the last man to step on the lunar surface and the sole geologist to ever reach the Moon. The two would collaborate throughout their careers with Schmitt playing an influential role in helping Taylor develop the Department of Earth and Planetary Sciences at UT.

In 1973, after 2 years of being an assistant professor at Purdue University, Taylor would arrive at the University of Tennessee, near the very beginning of the institution's dive into research. Taylor would remain at the University of Tennessee for the latter half of his life and become “one of the true giants in the field” of lunar science and the director of the University of Tennessee's department of earth and planetary sciences until his retirement in 2017.

== Early life (1938–1958) ==
Taylor was born September 14, 1938, in Paterson, New Jersey, and was raised in Port Jervis, New York, over a bar owned by his father. At the beginning of his senior year in high school, Taylor was involved in an automobile accident resulting in many broken bones and compound fractures including his pelvis and femur leaving him hospitalized for around 10 months. However, after returning to school, Taylor was still able to pass his final exams and graduate. After high school, Taylor began his higher education with night school at Orange County Community College in Middletown, New York.

== Education and early academic career (1958–1973) ==
In 1958, Taylor left New York state “one step ahead of the law" and started additional education at the Indiana University in Bloomington. In 1960 he wed Patricia Ann Ridley of Milford, Pennsylvania. In 1961, Taylor graduated but decided to stay and achieve a master's degree in geology due to a friend's persuasion. During this period, Taylor took on many miscellaneous occupations that included: driller, rocker shovel loader, powder-monkey, and geologist in mines in Ontario, Canada. In 1965, the first of his children, Jeffrey Andrew was born. In 1967 his daughter Kelly, was born. He was introduced to planetary geology at Lehigh University in Bethlehem, Pennsylvania. Taylor would continue his studies at various universities and institutes until 1971, when he was hired as an assistant professor at Purdue University. Just two years later (1973), Taylor would move to the University of Tennessee.

== Later career and death (1973–2017) ==
At the University of Tennessee, Taylor would achieve tenure after only two years and then become a full professor after another two years (1977). Taylor divorced his wife of 31 years in 1991. In 1993, Taylor married Dong-Hwa (Dawn) Shin. Throughout the rest of his career, Taylor would produce 542 peer-reviewed research papers, and would eventually partially retire in 2017 after 46 years of work. Taylor died on September 18, 2017, four days after his 79th birthday. Taylor's longtime colleague, Hap McSween, remembers him as a "diamond in the rough" and states that his "constant presence in the department will be missed."

== Works ==
Taylor led a prolific 46-year career with more than 100 articles published in science journals including:

- Nature
- Earth and Planetary Science Letters
- Geochimica et Cosmochimica Acta
- Meteoritics and Planetary Science
- Planetary and Space Science
- Lithos
- Acta Astronautica
- Polar Science
- Current Science.

In 2005, Taylor met with S. Ross Taylor and G. Jeffrey Taylor in the Gatlinburg, Tennessee Meteorological Society meeting to write "The Moon—A Taylor Perspective," also known as the "Taylor-cubed paper." This article was featured in a special 2006 issue of Geochimica et Cosmochimica Acta dedicated to Larry Haskin.
