= Rinse Zijlstra =

Dutch politician

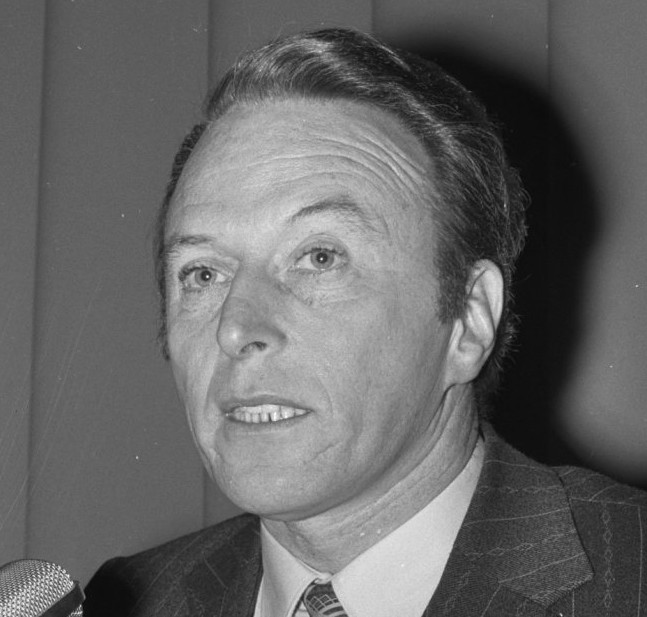

Senator
- In office 1983–1995

Mayor of Smallingerland
- In office 1975–1981

Member of the House of Representatives
- In office 1967–1973

Personal details
- Born: 19 April 1927 Oosterbierum, Netherlands
- Died: 26 September 2017 (aged 90) Beetsterzwaag, Netherlands
- Party: Christian Democratic Appeal (from 1980)
- Other political affiliations: Anti-Revolutionary Party (until 1980)

Rinse Zijlstra (19 April 1927 – 26 September 2017) was a Dutch politician.

Zijlstra was born in Oosterbierum to parents Ane Jelle Zijlstra and Pietje Postuma. His older brother was Jelle Zijlstra. Rinse Zijlstra served in the House of Representatives from 1967 to 1973 as a member of the Anti-Revolutionary Party. Between 1975 and 1981, Zijlstra was mayor of Smallingerland. He was elected to the Senate between 1983 and 1995, representing the Christian Democratic Appeal, which had absorbed the Anti-Revolutionary Party in 1980.

He died in Beetsterzwaag on 26 September 2017, aged 90.
