= Ann Bagnall =

British school teacher and publisher

- Born: Ann Haly; 25 March 1927; Edinburgh
- Died: 8 September 2017 (aged 90)
- Occupations: Educator, publisher

Ann O'Grady Bagnall (25 March 1927 - 8 September 2017) was a British school teacher of art, and a publisher who specialised in republishing historic cookbooks.

== Biography ==
She was born Ann Haly in Edinburgh on 25 March 1927, the daughter of John Haly, a naval officer, and his wife Marie, who was Tasmanian. She was raised in Bexhill on Sea. She was educated at Ancaster Gate School, which at that time was run by Aldous Huxley's sister, and later at Bedgebury Park School. She had to leave Bedgebury mid-term after the family's circumstances changed, and did not attend university, instead working as a chambermaid after her father fell on hard times. She paid her own fees to attend art college in Devon and then the Central School of Arts and Crafts in London.

Bagnall worked in advertising and then as an art teacher in schools in East Sussex, including at Lewes Girls' Grammar, Southover Manor and Hove Girls' Grammar Schools. Late in life, and after her retirement from teaching, she had the idea to reprint old cookbooks and in 1987 set up her own publishing company, Southover Press,. She specialised in publishing historic cookbooks and guides to household management, making them accessible to modern readers and cooks. Bagnall was very successful in finding forgotten Tudor and Georgian works, and published eighteen works, often with scholarly introductions. Bagmall retired and sold the list to Equinox Books in 2007.

Ann Haly married the education journalist Nicholas Bagnall (died 2016) at Battle (Hastings) in 1953, and they had two children. She died on the 8 September 2017, aged 90 years.
