= Junichi Arai =

Japanese textile designer

Junichi Arai (1932 - 25 September 2017) was a Japanese textile designer.

== See also ==
- Pirouette: Turning Points in Design – 2025 exhibition at the Museum of Modern Art
