= Luther Saxon =

American tenor

- Born: July 12, 1916; Fairfax, South Carolina, U.S.A.
- Died: September 1, 2017 (aged 101)
- Occupation: Singer
- Label: Decca Records

Luther Saxon (July 12, 1916 – September 12, 2017) was an American tenor who appeared in the role of Joe in the 1943 Broadway musical Carmen Jones.

== Biography ==
Saxon was born in Fairfax, South Carolina. He appeared in the original Carmen Jones cast album (Decca DL 9021), recorded in 1955 as well as Susanna, Don't You Cry [Musical, Romance, Original] along with the Hall Johnson Choir during May 22, 1939 - May 27, 1939. During his career he toured around the world as a soloist with the de Paur’s Infantry Chorus.

He died at the age of 101, on September 12, 2017.
