= Jeanne Robert (resistance member) =

Member of the French Resistance

- Born: 11 August 1914
- Died: 7 September 2017 (aged 103)
- Occupation: Teacher
- Known for: French Resistance

Jeanne Robert (11 August 1914 – 7 September 2017) was a member of the French Resistance.

Robert began her opposition to the Nazis by helping allied troops to make their way to the Dunkirk evacuation; this included helping them to obtain false identity documents. With France occupied, she fed intelligence to the British Special Operations Executive (SOE). She and her partner Maurice Rouneau moved to Vichy France, where they founded the resistance network "Victoire" in April 1942; this network became the largest in South West France. A teacher, she maintained her career as a cover and once had to escape from the Gestapo who had been waiting for her at the school gates. In October 1943, with the threat of capture being too great, she escaped France to England via Gibraltar. Having reached the safety of London in December 1943, she joined the Bureau Central de Renseignements et d'Action (BCRA), the Free French intelligence service. She returned to France following the liberation of Paris in August 1944. In recognition of her war service, she was awarded the Croix de Guerre. Considered overlooked by the post-war government, she was made a Chevalier of the Légion d'honneur in 2016. She died in 2017, aged 103.
