= Juzo Takaoka =

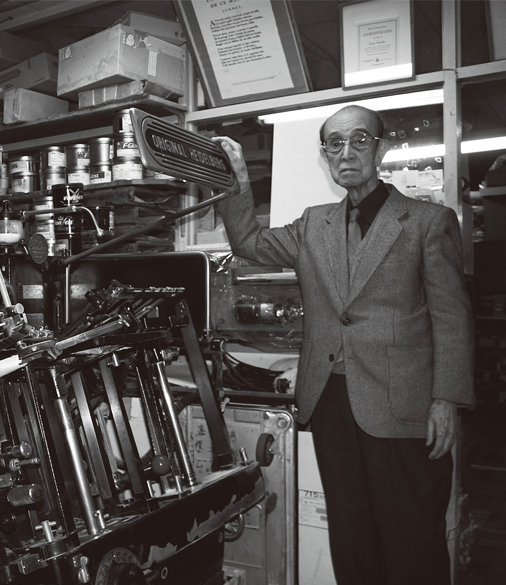
- Born: January 18, 1921; Kanda, Tokyo, Japan
- Died: September 15, 2017 (aged 96)
- Occupation: Letterpress printer
- Website: https://kazuipress.com/ (in Japanese)

Juzo Takaoka (高岡 重蔵, Takaoka Jūzō; January 18, 1921–September 15, 2017) was a Japanese letterpress printer specializing in Western typesetting. He was advisor to the Kazui Press Limited, a letterpress company in Tokyo, Japan, and a fellow of the Royal Society of Arts, UK.

== Personal history and profile ==
Juzo Takaoka was born in Tokyo in 1921. His father was a traditional Japanese bookbinder. Never caring much about money, his father was always poor, as were most craftspersons in those days. He paid little attention to his son's education.

After finishing elementary school, Takaoka was sent by his father to apprentice at a printing company. At the company, he was often treated badly by his seniors. They foisted on him all the things they did not want to do. During his second apprenticeship, he was again ill-treated by his seniors. They had him distribute types in the Latin alphabet to their type cases after printing. They could not read the alphabet, and the distribution of types was tedious for them. Takaoka could not read the alphabet either, something which had a positive outcome. He soon realized the advantage of handling the Latin alphabet: it basically has only 26 characters whereas Japanese has thousands. Before he knew it, Takaoka was completely captivated by Western typefaces.

In 1937, Takaoka read a short magazine article that would change his life. It was about the poor standard of Western typography in Japan and was written by Yoshimitsu Inouye (also known as Kazui Inoue), Takaoka's future teacher and mentor. Inouye, a lover of Western letterpress printing, worked in London between 1934 and 1939 as representative of major Japanese shipping company Nippon Yusen. While overseas, he developed expertise in Western typography and acquired a small printing press and types, enough to become an amateur printer. In January 1937, Inouye contributed the article to Japan's leading printing magazine, Insatsu Zasshi. His article had a strong impact on Japanese progressive printers and compositors of the time, inspiring them to form the Study Group on Western Typography so that they could learn directly from Inouye. Takaoka joined this group and was its youngest member. On February 17, 1940, the Study Group held its first meeting.

Enthralled by Inouye's lectures, Takaoka desperately wanted to become Inouye's apprentice. He persistently went to his home with work samples in hand to seek his permission. Though he was repeatedly turned away, Takaoka was finally accepted as Inouye's disciple in 1940 thanks to the mediation of Inouye's wife, Kimiko. He was the only member of the Study Group to be accepted as an apprentice.

With high aspirations, Takaoka started going to the Kazui Press, Inouye's private press based at his home in Harajuku, Tokyo. Even after Takaoka had gone several times, though, Inouye spoke not a word about typography. Instead, he told Takaoka about English towns and people in London. One day Takaoka gently asked Inouye to give him practical instruction on typography. Inouye scolded Takaoka, saying, “The instruction has already begun! Do you not see that? I am telling you about the people who will use the prints you make in Western typesetting. Without understanding their lifestyle and culture, you will not be able to meet their needs.” These words of Inouye shaped Takaoka's attitude toward letterpress work and typographic education. Under Inouye's tutelage, Takaoka mastered the principles and philosophy of Western typography and became an expert printer-typographer as well as a gentleman with social graces.

During the apprenticeship period, Takaoka used to go to Maruzen, the most prestigious bookstore in Tokyo at that time, to look for books on Western typography, whenever he had spare time and a bit of cash. Sticking out among the properly dressed clients with his poor attire, he could not possibly have been seen as a good customer, but the head clerk of Maruzen appreciated Takaoka's genuine enthusiasm for Western typography and often kept books aside for him and even paid for some of them himself.

In 1941, as World War II was spreading, Inouye and Takaoka were asked to cooperate in the production of Japan's war propaganda magazine Front by Tohosha, a publisher under the direct control of the Imperial Japanese Army.

Obviously inspired by the American magazine Life, Front was reputed for its excellence in design. The production team was composed of Japan's most talented people of the time, including Hiromu Hara and Ihei Kimura, who later became the nation's leading designer and photographer, respectively.

The many Western typefaces that Inouye collected during his posting in London were stored at the Kazui Press, but all of them were destroyed during the war. Inouye decided to reconstruct his printing shop after the war ended, and he entrusted much of the project to Takaoka. Upon receiving this request from Inouye, Takaoka left his work at Hosokawa Printing Co., Ltd., in Ginza, Tokyo, and set to creating a new printing shop for Inouye. In 1948, with funding from Inouye, the Kazui Press was reopened in Kanda-Kajicho, Tokyo. Busy with his primary job at the shipping company, Inouye entrusted an increasing amount of work to Takaoka, and the Kazui Press began to accept more commercial printing work. Helped by Inouye's acquaintances as well as by large orders from GHQ, Takaoka's business flourished.

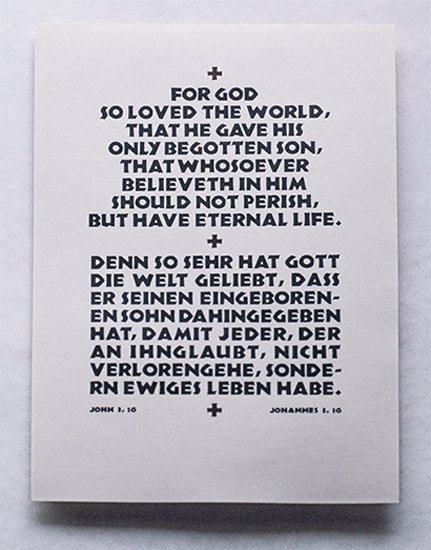
A piece from Juzo Takaoka's letterpress work, Ars Typographica 1

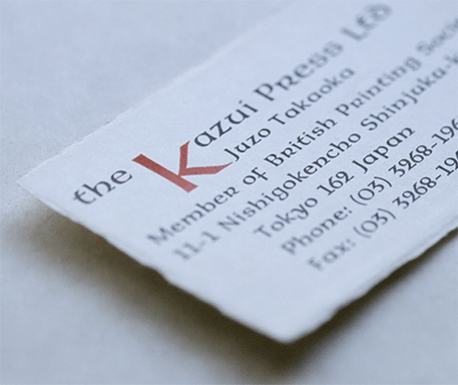
Juzo Takaoka's business card set in the American Uncial typeface

In 1956, when Inouye died, Takaoka took over the printing shop and made it into a limited company called the Kazui Press Limited. Takaoka's reputation as a letterpress printer was well established by then, and he was chosen to print certificates for the 1964 Tokyo Olympic medalists.

Without Inouye, however, Takaoka was increasingly unsure about his Western typographic skills. He had never been to the United Kingdom or any other part of Europe. In order to keep abreast of the latest trends in typography and maintain his unique status in Japan, he joined the British Printing Society (BPS) in 1965. His printed specimens made a strong impression on the BPS members, including Kenneth Hardacre of the Kit-Cat Press, John Easson of the Quarto Press, and Paul Peter Piech of the Taurus Press, all of whom became his lifelong friends.

In 1970, Takaoka made his first trip abroad to meet members of the BPS in London, bringing with him his latest letterpress work, Ars Typographica 1, and his business card, which was set in American Uncial. He traveled on from there to Frankfurt, Germany, to visit the D. Stempel AG type foundry to buy the Optima typeface designed by Hermann Zapf, who was then type director at Stempel. After returning home from Europe, Takaoka received a letter from Stempel saying that Zapf was very impressed with his printing and would like to meet him when he visited Germany again. In 1972, Takaoka and Eiichi Kono (see below for profile) traveled to Germany together with a group of Japanese printers to visit the Drupa trade fair, the world's largest printing equipment exhibition. During their stay, Takaoka met Zapf for the first time. After that, they visited each other a number of times and became lifelong friends.

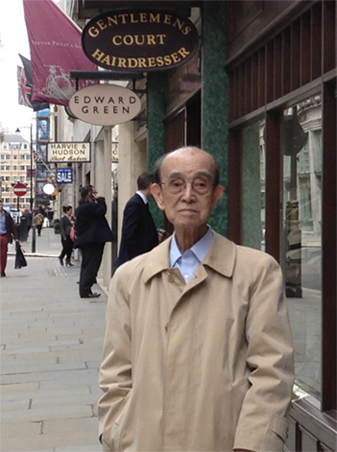
A snapshot of Juzo Takaoka taken during his visit to London in 2013

Takaoka frequently visited the UK and other countries in Europe to obtain metal types at type foundries and to deepen his ties with typeface designers, typographers, and letterpress printers. He had a long friendship with Susan Shaw, founder of the Type Archive (formerly, Type Museum), London; James Mosley, former librarian at the St Bride Library, London; and the Cardozo Kindersley Workshop (formerly, David Kindersley Workshop), Cambridge.

Takaoka received the Overseas Award in both 1975 and 1984 and the Printer of the Year Award ’89 in 1990 from BPS.

In 1995, Takaoka became advisor to the Kazui Press, and his son, Masao, took over the presidency. In the same year, Takaoka was conferred the title of Fellow of the Royal Society of Arts.

From 1998 to 2002, Takaoka served as adviser to the Printing House, a printing workshop operated by the Printing Museum, Tokyo, of Toppan Printing Co., Ltd.

Between the mid-1960s and the 1980s, Takaoka ran a typography workshop called “Friday Salon” every Friday for a small number of young design students and graduates as well as amateur printers.

Eiichi Kono, who is known for his design of the New Johnston typeface for London Underground and the Meiryo type for Microsoft, attended Friday Salon, and his longtime student-teacher relationship with Takaoka continued to this day. Akira Kobayashi, type director at Monotype GmbH, has also looked up to Takaoka as his mentor since their first meeting in the 1990s. Both Kono and Kobayashi travelled to Europe with Takaoka many times to visit places of relevance to typography.

My Study of Letterpress Typography, a collection of Takaoka's letterpress studies created mainly in the 1970s, was published in 2013.

That same year, Takaoka visited the UK at the invitation of the Double Crown Club and attended the Club's dinner as Kono's guest.

In 2014, Kono contributed an article about Takaoka's long career as letterpress printer to Matrix 32, which is published by the Whittington Press. For the article, John Randle of the Whittington Press wrote an introduction in which he says:

The range of work and types shown in My Study of Letterpress Typography, a beautifully designed and printed (in Japan) large octavo, is truly extraordinary. How did this man from the 1930s onwards collect together the gems of the European typefoundries and put them to such good use that they could have come from the hands of any of the most able European typographers? His list of typefaces reads like a roll-call of the great and the good . . . . Juzo has achieved all this with little or no knowledge of English. And still going strong, now inspiring another generation of young Japanese typographers.

After retirement from letterpress work, Takaoka wittily described himself to his acquaintances and interviewers both in Japan and abroad, saying, “I left my composing stick for a walking stick!”

He died on September 15, 2017, at the age of 96 in Tokyo.

=== Letterpress studies ===
While working as a commercial printer, Takaoka created several collections of letterpress studies:

- Light Up, Won’t You? (1942)
- Ars Typographica 1 (1970, reprinted in 1972)
- Wandering from Type to Type (1973)
- Wandering from Type to Type · Two (1979)

Takaoka's letterpress studies in the 1970s were highly regarded overseas for the high level of skill and understanding of Western typography that they demonstrated. These works are included in My Study of Letterpress Typography.

== Authored books (in Japanese) ==
- Ōbun katsuji [Latin types]. Tokyo: Insatsu Gakkai Shuppanbu, 1948 (first edition), 2001 and 2004 (reprinted editions).
- Ōbun katsuji [Latin types]. Tokyo: Uyu Shorin, 2010 (new format edition).
- Takaoka Jūzō kappan shūsakushū: My Study of Letterpress Typography. Tokyo: Uyu Shorin, 2013.

== Coauthored and edited books (in Japanese) ==
- Ōbun katsuji to taipogurafi [Latin types and typography]. Tokyo: Insatsu Gakkai Shuppanbu, 1966 (coauthor).
- Inouye, Yoshimitsu, and Tarō Shimo. Rōmaji insatsu kenkyū [Roman alphabet print research]. Tokyo: Dai Nippon Insatsu ICC Honbu, 2000 (coauthor).
- “Insatsu Zasshi” to sono jidai: jikkyō insatsu no kingendaishi [Printing Magazine and its era: current and modern history of printing in Japan]. Tokyo: Insatsu Gakkai Shuppanbu, 2008 (supervisory editor and commentator).
- Takaoka, Masao. Ōbun kumihan: kumihan no kiso to manā [Western language typesetting: basics and styles]. Tokyo: Bijutsu Shuppansha, 2010 (supervisory editor).

== Teaching ==
Takaoka also taught at an art university and technical college, instructing typography through courses on letterpress printing.

- Part-time lecturer, Musashino Art University Junior College of Art and Design, 1970–90.
- Part-time lecturer, Department of Graphic Design, Nihon Kogakuin College, 1975–90.
