= Andreas Howaldt =

German sailor (1925–2017)

Andreas Howaldt (21 April 1925 – 5 September 2017) was a German sailor who competed in the 1952 Summer Olympics.
