= Augustine Hoey =

English priest (1915–2017)

Monsignor Augustine Hoey

Personal details
- Born: 22 December 1915
- Died: 26 September 2017 (aged 101) St Peter's Residence, Vauxhall, London, United Kingdom
- Buried: Walsingham, United Kingdom
- Denomination: Roman Catholic

Augustine Hoey (born Thomas Kenneth Hoey, 22 December 1915 – 26 September 2017) was an English priest who served as the prior of the Anglo-Catholic Community of the Resurrection in Mirfield in West Yorkshire and also at the Royal Foundation of St Katharine.

Hoey spent most of his life as an Anglican, but converted to Catholicism and was ordained as a Catholic priest in 1995. He was made a monsignor by Pope Francis.
