= Sybil Flory =

Sybil Flory (née LeFleur; 8 April 1920 – 2 September 2017) was a pharmacist, seamstress and teacher. She was born in Burma to a Burmese mother and a French father. Her mother died in childbirth. The sisters had grown up with an elder brother and sister in a middle-class home in Syriam. They were raised in the Roman Catholic faith.

Sybil LeFleur had been a primary school teacher and a seamstress at Rangoon's renowned department store Rowe & Co. She was separated from her sister in Rangoon on the date the Japanese attacked (23 December 1941). By that time their father had also died. The father of her best friend Bertha, who was a silk merchant, told Sybil there was no way they could return to Rangoon or look for her family. She fled with her friend's family.

By August 1943 she had married a hospital pharmacist, soldier Reid Flory from Scotland. The couple had four children. She arrived in Scotland in February 1946 at Glasgow and moved into the family home in Ellon, Aberdeenshire. Her husband was the last Provost of Huntly. She became President of the Townswomen's Guild and remained a devout Catholic all her life and a member of St Margaret's Church, Huntly.

She was re-united with her sister, Blanche, after 66 years in Calcutta in October 2007, when Sybil was 87 and Blanche was 85. Their elder siblings were both deceased by that point. Their story was told in the book Torn Apart.

== Death ==
Sybil Flory died on 2 September 2017 in Huntly, aged 97. She was predeceased by her husband and her elder son, and survived by her three other children and extended family.
