= Michael Freeman (surgeon) =

British orthopaedic surgeon

Professor Michael Freeman FRCS
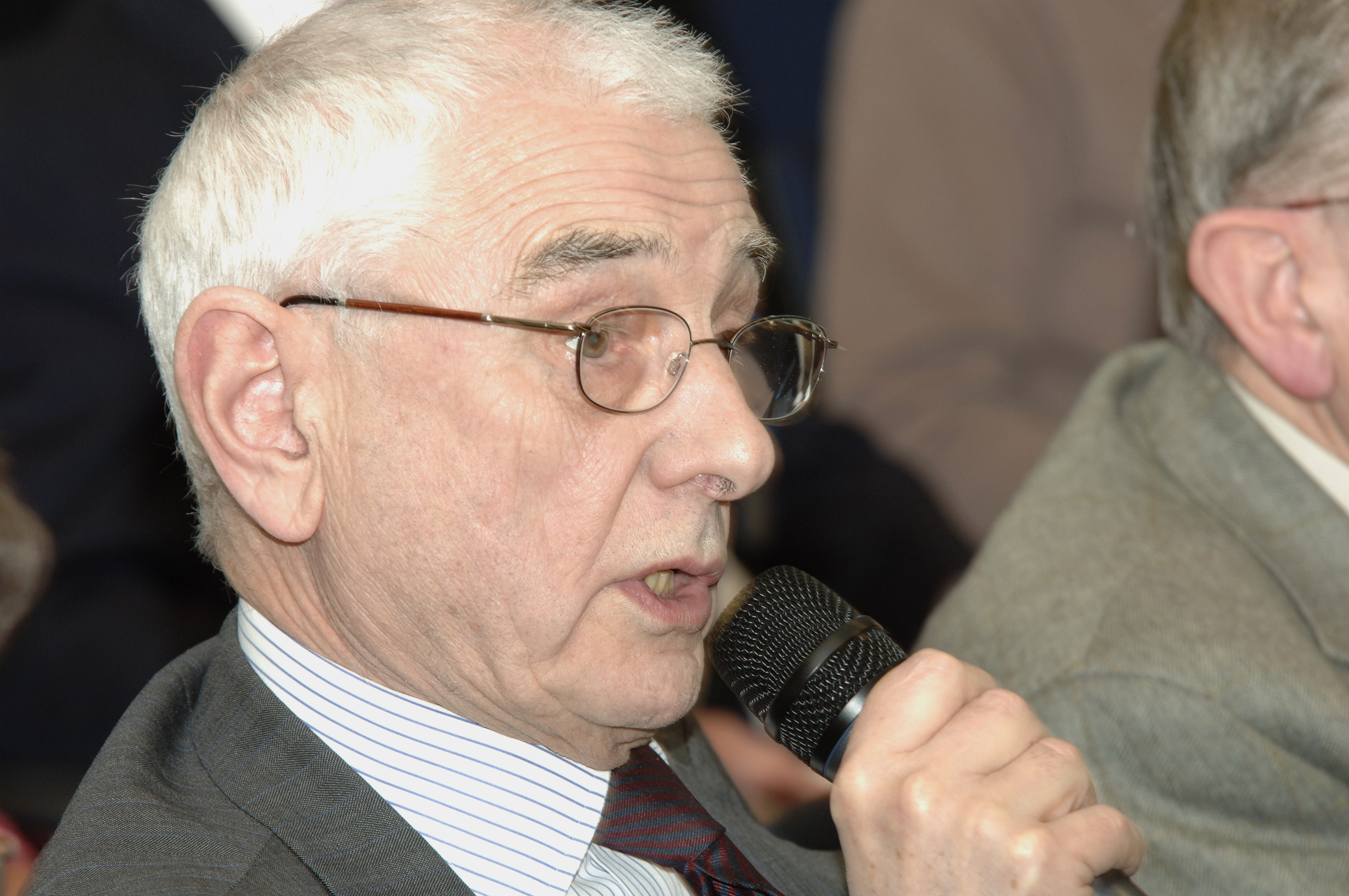
- Born: 1931
- Died: 14 September 2017 (aged 85)
- Education: London Hospital
- Occupation: Orthopaedic surgeon
- Employer: London Hospital

Michael Alexander Reykers Freeman FRCS (1931 –14 September 2017), also known as Mike, was a British orthopaedic surgeon, responsible for developing several new techniques for joint rebuilding or replacement.

Freeman underwent his medical training at the London Hospital.

In 1968 he became Consultant Orthopaedic Surgeon at the London Hospital where he remained until his retirement in 1996, when he became an Honorary Consultant at the Royal Hospitals NHS Trust.

He was also a research fellow at Imperial College, from 1968 until 1979.

He jointly founded, with Alan Swanson, the Biomechanics Unit at Imperial College London.

He served as president of the International Hip Society from 1982 to 1985; of the British Hip Society from 1989 to 1991; and of the British Orthopaedic Association from 1992 to 1993.

He was the author of several significant books and papers on joint repair and replacement.

He died on 14 September 2017 at the age of 85.
