= Charles Roff =

Scottish photographer, gallery owner and bon viveur

Charles Roff

Charles Roff (1 January 1952 – 25 September 2017) was a Scottish photographer, gallery owner and bon viveur.
