= Spikeld =

Norwegian Standardbred racehorse

Spikeld (1993-2017) was a Norwegian trotting horse, from Elding and Spikdona. He was trained by Kjell Håkonsen. The horse's height was 158 cm. It set a best time for a 7-year old horse with a kilometre time of 1:18.6.

Spikeld retired in 2006. After his racing career he was active as a breeding stallion.

Spikeld was euthanized in September 2017.

== Racing career ==
- Starts: 186
- 1st places: 127
- 2nd places: 15
- 3rd places: 10
