= E Thi =

Burmese fortune teller

E Thi (ET)
- Born: Swe Swe Win c. 1970
- Died: 10 September 2017 (aged 46–47)
- Other name: ET
- Occupation: Fortune teller

E Thi (ET, Burmese: အီးတီ), born Swe Swe Win (Burmese: ဆွေဆွေဝင်း), was a prominent Burmese soothsayer and fortune-teller notable for her clients, including Southeast Asian political leaders ranging from the Thai prime minister Thaksin Shinawatra as well as Than Shwe, the former ruler of Burma (Myanmar). She was given the nickname ET because of her resemblance to E.T. in the American film E.T. the Extra-Terrestrial. E Thi was physically disabled, blind, and had a speech impediment, which required her sister, Thi Thi Win, to translate her predictions.

On 23 July 2012, Kantana, a Thai film company, held a press conference in Bangkok to announce a biopic on E Thi's life. The screenplay is based on a script written by Si Phyo Tun, E Thi's nephew. The eight-episode television series, Extraordinary Gift, was directed by Thai film director Nirattisai Kaljaruek and aired on two Thai television channels. Nititar Chawpayark was cast as E Thi. Her sister, Thi Thi Win, owns Ever Top Production company, which is cooperating with Kantana for the production.

E Thi reportedly earned a monthly salary of US$7 million for her consultations.

== See also ==
- Yadaya
- Astrology
