= Wolfgang Michels =

German musician (1951–2017)

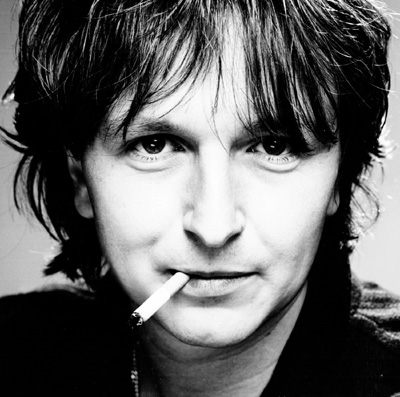

Background information
- Born: 15 July 1951; Delmenhorst, West Germany
- Origin: Hamburg, West Germany
- Died: 14 September 2017 (aged 66) Hamburg, Germany
- Occupations: Singer-songwriter, musician, producer
- Instruments: Vocals, guitar
- Years active: 1967–2017
- Label: ferryhouse/Warner
- Website: wolfgang-michels.de

Wolfgang Michels (15 July 1951 – 14 September 2017) was a German singer-songwriter, guitarist and producer.

== Biography ==
=== Early years ===
In May 1968, Michels recorded a song under pseudonym "One Plus None" and scored a No. 2 BBC radio hit with "Desert Walker", a song produced by himself, topped only by the Rolling Stones at No. 1. English blues musician Alexis Korner invited Michels to London and introduced him to the local scene.

=== Percewood's Onagram ===
Michels founded the psychedelic rock band Percewood's Onagram in 1969 and served as singer, guitarist and composer. In the early 1970s, the band became the first German independent band releasing four albums on their own label (Onagram Records) with lyrics and music all provided by Michels. After the band's split in 1974, Michels returned to London to pursue a solo career where he appeared at the Marquee Club among other venues.

=== California years ===
In 1975, he moved to San Francisco, California, where he subsequently recorded two solo albums in collaboration with Neil Young and producer/engineer John Nowland as the first German musician. For the album "Full Moon California Sunset", Michels was awarded the "Deutscher Schallplattenpreis", the predecessor of the Echo Music Prize, in 1978.

=== German years ===
From 1981 until 1985, Michels released three solo albums in German, written and produced in collaboration with renowned German singer/composer Rio Reiser. This period was followed by 1990 hit "Dancing on the Edge of Life" released under the pseudonym "Percewood". The song became a chart hit Michels presented on German television shows. In the 1990s, all Michels and Percewood's Onagram albums were rereleased by Warner Brothers in Germany.

In 1993, Michels was invited by Joan Baez to perform as her support act in the "Philharmonie" concert hall in Munich, Germany.

=== 2000 years ===
In 2003, Warner Strategic Marketing/Warner Music Germany had released the complete Michels/Percewood's Onagram back catalogue as digitally remastered CDs with previously unreleased bonus tracks and alternative takes. Two best-of albums were also released. In the same year, German hip hop group Fettes Brot scored a chart hit with the Michels–Reiser song "Ich bin müde" ("I'm tired"). The national daily newspaper the Frankfurter Allgemeine Zeitung praised it as one of the best songs of the year.

=== Comeback and death ===
In April 2008, Michels released a new studio album Zuhause ("At home") with 14 new songs recorded at Franz Plasa's home studio. German singer Udo Lindenberg called it a "world class" album while German music magazine Musikexpress claimed the album to be "A dozen songs for eternity". Michels promoted the album with a concert tour, supporting Neil Young in Hamburg in August 2008. He also played with Beth Hart and Joan Armatrading. In 2009, Michels continued his concert and television promoting activities and touring with Young in June on the German leg of his European tour.

On 14 September 2017, Michels died after a long-term disease.

== Discography ==
=== LPs ===
- 1975 Kunstkopf Live – Hamburger Folk-Rock Session '75, Sky777 (Michels is NOT credited with playing on this LP BUT he is credited with writing and arranging all of the songs)
- 1976 New Wave Dropouts, Pastels
- 1977 Full Moon California Sunset, Telefunken
- 1979 Crazy Enough, Pastels, Bellaphon
- 1981 Irgendwas stimmt hier nicht, Metronome
- 1983 Keine Probleme, Teldec
- 1985 Bei Mondschein..., Teldec

=== Vinyl samplers ===
- 1981 Rock in Deutschland Vol. 8 – Strand, Teldec
- 1982 Rock in Deutschland Vol. 3 – Neue deutsche Unterhaltungsmusik, Teldec

=== Singles (7") as One Plus None ===
- 1968 Virgin

A: You're Looking So Good / Please Be Faithful B: Drive Me Somewhere (1st Version) / Religion And Love / Death of Mr.G.

=== Singles (7") as Michels ===
- 1978 Telefunken

A: Do You Still Dig It / B: Ramona from Roma

- 1979 Bellaphon

A: Now I Know You / B: Crazy Enough

- 1981 Metronome / Nature

A: Bitte Sehr (Wenn die dunklen Wolken…) / B: Unten im Keller

- 1981 Metronome / Nature

A: Tanz auf dem Vulkan / B: Irgendwas stimmt hier nicht

- 1983 Teldec

A: Kleiner Träumer / B: Zukunft der Vergangenheit

- 1984 Teldec

A: Dies könnte unsre Heimat sein / B: Keine Probleme

- 1985 Teldec

A: Bei Mondschein… / B: Brechen kannst du mich nie

- 1986 Teldec

A: Love Letters to the Moon / B: Herzverloren

=== Singles (7") as Percewood ===
- 1990 Mercury

A: Dancin' on the Edge of Life / B: Lover and Friend

(Charts: #45 D – Media Control)

=== Maxi-CDs as Michels ===
- 1994 BMG (Do-CD Promo Digipack)

Lebenslange Reisen / Bring Me Water / Bring Me Water (Acoustic Version)

- 1995 BMG 1995

Bring Me Water / Take Me Back into Your Arms / 100 Beats Per Minute / Bring Me Water (Acoustic Version)

- 2003 Warner Music (Promo)

Deal Together

=== CDs as Michels ===
- 1990 Full Moon California Sunset, Castle Communications & BMG 1994 & 2003 Warner Music+
- 1994 + 2003 Crazy Enough, BMG & Warner Music +
- 2003 Irgendwas stimmt hier nicht, Warner Music +
- 1994 + 2003 Keine Probleme, BMG & Warner +
- 1994 + 2003 Bei Mondschein…, BMG & Warner Music +
- 1994 Orange Kindergarten, BMG
- 2003 Das Beste – Zukunft der Vergangenheit, Warner Music +
- 2003 The Essential Collection – Pictures of the Past, Warner Music +
- 2008 Zuhause, ferryhouse, Warner Music

+ Digital remastered, with unreleased bonus-tracks and alternative-versions

=== As producer ===
- Percewood's Onagram
- John Hartford
- 1980 Das dritte Ohr Zahltag, Teldec
- 1987 Short Romans Short Romans, Upfront/Teldec
