= Walter Guralnick =

American dentist

Walter Charles Guralnick, DMD (November 1916 – September 6, 2017) was a Boston-based dentist who helped launch dental insurance in Massachusetts. He was Professor of Oral and Maxillofacial Surgery, Emeritus, at Massachusetts General Hospital and Dean of the Harvard School of Dental Medicine. He lived in Chestnut Hill, Massachusetts. His wife of 68 years, Betty Marson Guralnick, died in 2010 at age 89.

Guralnick worked for 65 years at the Massachusetts General Hospital in Boston.

== Education ==
- Graduated from Boston Latin School and went to Massachusetts State College, which later became the University of Massachusetts Amherst
- Harvard School of Dental Medicine in 1941
