= Jerry Balmuth =

American philosopher

Jerome "Jerry" Balmuth (May 8, 1924 - September 28, 2017) was an American philosopher and the Harry Emerson Fosdick Professor of Philosophy and Religion, Emeritus, at Colgate University in Hamilton, New York.

== Early life ==
Balmuth developed his interest in philosophy after high school, when he enrolled in a philosophy night course at the City College of New York. In 1944 he joined the United States Army and was assigned to a Signal Corps unit. He subsequently attended officer candidate school and was commissioned as a second lieutenant, transferring to the military police. In 1948 he was discharged at the rank of first lieutenant. Balmuth then attended Amherst College on the G.I. Bill. After graduating Phi Beta Kappa and magna cum laude from Amherst, Balmuth entered graduate school at Cornell University, where he held a Sage Fellowship, and later, a Danforth Fellowship.

== Academic career ==
In 1954, Balmuth joined the faculty at Colgate, where he commenced a 50+ year teaching career. Balmuth specialized in Wittgenstein's philosophy and influence, history of philosophy, religion, aesthetics, (symbolic and advanced), philosophy of law, philosophy of logic, meta-ethics and their connection with the philosophy of language.

== Recognition ==
During his career, Balmuth received all four Colgate teaching awards: Alumni Corporation Distinguished Teaching Award, AAUP Professor of the Year, Phi Eta Sigma Professor of the Year Award and the Samuel French Award.

The Jerome Balmuth Endowed Fund, established in 2000, provides annual support to attract visiting lecturers on philosophy to Colgate. The Jerome Balmuth Scholarship Fund, established in 2004, provides academic awards with a preference for a philosophy major. In 2009, Colgate established the Jerome Balmuth Award for Teaching and Student-Faculty Engagement.

== Works ==
Balmuth's published works include his contributions to Marxist Social Thought (1968) and articles in Mind.
