= Tim Hackworth =

Tim Hackworth

Brigadier Timothy William Hackworth (17 January 1933 – 29 September 2017), OBE, was a soldier in the British Army, an engineer, and a mathematician.

In Korea, Hackworth was the British defence attaché in Seoul, commander of the Commonwealth Liaison Mission to the United Nations Command Korea, and Commonwealth member of the United Nations Military Armistice Commission. Later, Hackworth was a military knight of Windsor.
