= Fritz Luty =

American physicist

Fritz Luty (1928 – 11 September 2017) was an American physicist.

He was born in Essen, Germany, and briefly saw action as a teenager in the German Army towards the end of World War II. He then studied physics and was awarded a PhD by the University of Göttingen. After working as an assistant professor in Stuttgart, he moved in 1965 to the United States to be a full professor at the University of Utah, where he subsequently spent his whole career.

He was elected a Fellow of the American Physical Society in 1972.

He was married with two sons.
