= Chyung Jinkyu =

South Korean writer

Chyung JinKyu
- Born: October 19, 1939; Anseong, Korea, Empire of Japan
- Died: September 28, 2017 (aged 77); Seoul, South Korea
- Writing career
- Language: Korean

- Chyung Jinkyu
- Hangul: 정진규
- RR: Jeong Jingyu
- MR: Chŏng Chin'gyu

Chyung JinKyu (Korean: 정진규; October 19, 1939 – September 28, 2017) was a South Korean writer.

== Life ==
Chyung JinKyu was born on October 19, 1939, in Anseong, Keiki-dō, Korea, Empire of Japan. Chyung attended Anseong Agricultural School, and then graduated from Korea University in 1964 with a degree in Korean Literature.

Chyung died on September 28, 2017, at Asan Medical Center in Seoul.

== Work ==
While many poets focused on larger political issues Chyung displayed linguistic sensibility as he sang of life's ambiguities and the contradictions of the times from a personal viewpoint. His early poetry is characterized by its beautiful, exquisite language, and its deep immersion in self-consciousness. From the mid-1960s, the poet grappled in his work with the conflict between life and poetry, which in turn, caused the poet serious inner turmoil. He attempted to overcome this essential conflict in his critical essays, "Siui aemaehame daehayeo" and "Siui jeongjikhame daehayeo." Despite his efforts, however, he could not easily find the positive balance between poetic indulgence and quotidian existence.

After the publication of his collection Deulpanui biin jibiroda, he began to incorporate elements of prose into his poetry, which enabled him to shift from a focus on individual to collective consciousness. In order to sustain this stylistic transformation, the poet engaged in a process that reaffirmed the fundamental poetical quality of his work. This process contributed to a significant development in Jung's aesthetic. One critic noted that Chyung JinKyu transfers the rhythm of nature with the eyes that discover the depth of human lives in nature.

== Works in translation ==
- Tanz der Worte (정진규 시선)

== Works in Korean (partial) ==
Poetry

- Mareun susukkangui pyeonghwa
- Yuhanui bitjang
- Deulpanui biin jibiroda(1977)
- Maedallyeo isseumui sesang
- Bieoisseumui chungman
- Yeonpillo sseugi
- Ppyeoe daehayeo
- Byeoldeurui batangeun eodumi mattanghada

Biography

- Lee Sanghwa entitled, Madonna eonjendeul an gal su isseurya.

== Awards ==
- Korean Poets Association Award (Hanguk siin hyeophoesang, 1980)
- Woltan Literature Prize (Woltan munhaksang, 1985)
- Contemporary Poetry Award (Hyeondae sihak jakpumsang, 1987)
