= Joep Baartmans-van den Boogaart =

Dutch politician

Johanna Lamberdina Maria "Joep" Baartmans-van den Boogaart (16 December 1939, Eindhoven – September 29, 2017) was a Dutch politician. She was a member of the Labour Party (PvdA).

She was a member of the municipal council of Boxmeer, a member of the Provincial Council of North Brabant and a member of the provincial executive. She also served as ad interim mayor of several municipalities in North Brabant: Heusden, Schijndel, Son en Breugel, and Vught.
