= Gary I. Wadler =

American writer and medic (1939–2017)

- Born: Gary Irwin Wadler; January 12, 1939; Brooklyn, New York, U.S.
- Died: September 12, 2017 (aged 78); Port Washington, New York, U.S.
- Education: Brooklyn College; Weill Cornell Medical College
- Medical career
- Profession: Physician
- Field: Internal medicine Sports medicine
- Institutions: New York University Medical Center

Gary Irwin Wadler (January 12, 1939 – September 12, 2017) was an American internist with special expertise in the field of drug use in sports. The lead author of the book Drugs and the Athlete, Wadler served on the World Anti-Doping Agency's (WADA) Prohibited List and Methods Committee and on its Health, Medicine, and Research Committee. Additionally, he served as: Medical Advisor to the White House Office of National Drug Control Policy, a Trustee of the Board of the American College of Sports Medicine and of the Women’s Sports Foundation. Among his other sports medicine activities, he served as Tournament Physician of the U.S. Open Tennis Championships.

For his work in the field of drugs in sports, Gary Wadler received the International Olympic Committee's President's Prize in 1993. He was a frequent lecturer and his opinions were widely sought by the print and electronic media nationally and internationally. In addition, he served as Chairman of the American Ballet Theatre's Medical Advisory Board and Chairman of the College Council of the State University of New York at Old Westbury.

Wadler maintained a private practice in Internal Medicine and Sports Medicine in Manhasset, New York and was a Clinical Associate Professor of Medicine at the NYU School of Medicine.

Wadler also served as chairman and President of the Nassau County Sports Commission.

Wadler died on September 12, 2017, at the age of 78. His widow Nancy stated that he had been suffering from multiple system atrophy for five years prior to his death.
