= Robert J. McFarlin =

American politician and civil engineer

Member of the Minnesota House of Representatives
- In office 1967–1970

Personal details
- Born: December 3, 1929 Easton, Pennsylvania, U.S.
- Died: September 24, 2017 (aged 87) Duluth, Minnesota, U.S.
- Education: University of Delaware; University of Minnesota
- Occupation: civil engineer

Robert John McFarlin, Sr. (December 3, 1929 – September 24, 2017) was an American politician and a civil engineer.

McFarlin was born in Easton, Pennsylvania. He graduated from the University of Delaware in 1951 and University of North Dakota in 1956 with bachelor's degrees in civil engineering. He served in the Minnesota House of Representatives for District 30B from 1967 to 1970, and for District 41B in 1973 to 1974. McFarlin lived with his wife and family in St. Louis Park, Minnesota, and work as a consulting and civil engineer. McFarlin died on September 24, 2017, in Duluth, Minnesota.
