= Samuel W. Doss Jr. =

American politician

Member of the Georgia State Senate from the 52nd district
- In office 1969–1978

Personal details
- Born: December 3, 1927 Thomas County, Georgia, U.S.
- Died: September 15, 2017 (aged 89)
- Party: Democratic
- Education: Vallejo Junior College; West Georgia College; Emory University

Samuel W. Doss Jr. (December 3, 1927 – September 15, 2017) was an American politician who served as a Democratic member for the 52nd district of the Georgia State Senate.

== Life and career ==
Doss was born in Thomas County, Georgia. He attended Vallejo Junior College, West Georgia College and Emory University.

Doss served in the Georgia State Senate from 1969 to 1978, representing the 52nd district.

Doss died on September 15, 2017, at the age of 89.
