= John Mockler =

John Mockler may refer to:

- John Mockler (politician) (born 1941), California state official
- John Mockler (hurler) (1866–?), Irish hurler
