= Arnold Sagalyn =

Arnold J. Sagalyn
- Born: March 2, 1918; Springfield, Massachusetts
- Died: September 11, 2017 (aged 99); Washington, D.C.
- Occupations: journalist, writer, producer, assistant publisher, government employee, private consultant, businessman
- Spouse: Louise (née London) (m. 1957)
- Children: 4

Arnold J. Sagalyn (March 2, 1918 – September 11, 2017) was an American journalist, government employee, and private consultant in the area of law enforcement and security.

== Biography and career ==
Arnold J. Sagalyn was born on March 2, 1918, in Springfield, Massachusetts. He graduated from Oberlin College in Ohio and the Graduate Institute of International and Development Studies in Geneva, Switzerland.

In 1939, he became a special assistant for Eliot Ness of "The Untouchables" fame, who, at the time, was the safety director of Cleveland, Ohio. He helped Ness in the reorganization of the city's police department. In 1942, while working for the Cleveland Press, Sagalyn and the writer William Miller were sent to investigate a suspect in a notorious series of murders, known as the Cleveland Torso Murders case. The suspect from Maysville, Kentucky, known as the "Kentucky butcher," had committed a grisly murder, and enjoying ties with the local government, served a brief sentence. As the suspect threatened the journalists with an axe, they were unable to interview him. Sagalyn later told this story to James Jessen Badal during making of his book about the Cleveland murders. The same year, Sagalyn came to Washington where he helped to organize a nationwide law enforcement program against prostitution.

During World War II, Sagalyn was an aide to the Chief of the Public Safety Division of the Office of Military Government for Germany. There, he helped reorganize the German police system.

As a journalist, Sagalyn worked for Life magazine in 1947–1949 and for The New York Times in 1949–1952. He worked as writer and producer for NBC between 1952 and 1954. He was a partner in Mountain Fir Lumber Company the next three years and became an assistant publisher for Northern Virginia Sun in 1957.

Sagalyn was named director of the United States Department of the Treasury's Office of Law Enforcement Coordination in 1961, where he advised the Secretary on law enforcement policy and coordinated the operations of the Treasury Department's enforcement agencies. These included the U.S. Secret Service; the Bureau of Narcotics; the Bureau of Customs’ Investigations and Enforcement Division; the Internal Revenue Service's Intelligence, Inspection and Alcohol and Tobacco Tax Divisions; and the U.S. Coast Guard's Intelligence Division.

While at the Treasury Department, Sagalyn served as the U.S. representative for the International Criminal Police Organization (INTERPOL) from 1961 to 1967 and was its Senior Vice President from 1962 to 1965. He also became the Treasury representative to the President's Commission on Law Enforcement and Administration of Justice in 1965. At the same time, he served as the Advisor on Public Safety to the Secretary of Housing and Urban Development. In 1967, he served as an associate public safety director for the National Advisory Commission on Civil Disorders where he studied the police response to the many riots that occurred that year and made associated recommendations.

In September 1968, Sagalyn left government service, switching to private consulting, working for Arthur D. Little, Inc. In 1970, he founded Security Planning Corporation, a research and consulting firm, specialized in crime prevention and security and risk management. The company was a partnership with his spouse Louise Sagalyn, Peter Labovitz and John Labovitz. In 1974, Sagalyn was retained by the House Judiciary Committee to develop a system by which documents and material associated with the House's impeachment proceedings of President Richard Nixon could be securely safeguarded. By the 1990s, he ran the consulting firm Sagalyn Advocates.

Sagalyn donated a collection of his papers and books to the American University library in March 2004 and again in July 2012. These papers include his works of 1931–2004, covering primarily the topics of law enforcement, police work, terrorism, and civil disorder, and a memoir published in 2010.

== Personal life ==
Arnold Sagalyn married Louise London (born 1927), a lawyer, in 1957. He had three sisters, Esther S. Bick (1914–2012), Lenore Cohen and Lillian Burack, and three brothers, Julian, Robert and Irwin Sagalyn; all of them predeceased him. He died at the age of 99 at his home in Washington on September 11, 2017.

== Bibliography ==
- Arnold Sagalyn; Duke International Law Society (1966). The Pursuit of International Criminals. Treasury Department.
- Arnold Sagalyn (1974). Residential Security. National Institute of Law Enforcement and Criminal Justice.
- Robert Buchanan; Hubert Bath (2010). A Promise Fulfilled: The Memoir of Arnold Sagalyn. ISBN 978-1-4507-0759-6.
