= J. Kates =

American poet

- Born: James George Kates; 1945 (age 80–81); White Plains, New York
- Education: Wesleyan University
- Occupations: Poet, editor, translator
- Spouse: Helen Safronsky Kates
- Children: Stanislav, Paula
- Writing career
- Language: English
- Genres: Poetry, translations
- Notable works: Mappemonde (Oyster River Press); Metes and Bounds (Accents Publishing); The Old Testament (Cold Hub Press); The Briar Patch (Hobblebush Books); Places of Permanent Shade (Accents Publishing)

James George "Jim" Kates is a minor poet and a literary translator. He has been awarded three National Endowment for the Arts Fellowships, an Individual Artist Fellowship from the New Hampshire State Council on the Arts, the Cliff Becker Book Prize in Translation and a Käpylä Translation Prize. He has published three chapbooks of his own poems: Mappemonde (Oyster River Press) Metes and Bounds (Accents Publishing) and The Old Testament (Cold Hub Press) and two full books, The Briar Patch (Hobblebush Books) and Places of Permanent Shade (Accents Publishing). He is the translator of The Score of the Game and An Offshoot of Sense (Tatiana Shcherbina); Say Thank You and Level with Us (Mikhail Aizenberg); When a Poet Sees a Chestnut Tree, Secret Wars, and I Have Invented Nothing (Jean-Pierre Rosnay); Corinthian Copper (Regina Derieva); Live by Fire (Aleksey Porvin); Thirty-nine Rooms (Nikolai Baitov); Psalms (Genrikh Sapgir); Muddy River (Sergey Stratanovsky); Selected Poems 1957-2009, and Sixty Years (Mikhail Yeryomin); and Paper-thin Skin (Aigerim Tazhi). He is the translation editor of Contemporary Russian Poetry, and the editor of In the Grip of Strange Thoughts: Russian Poetry in a New Era.

== Career ==
Since 1997, with Leora Zeitlin, Kates has co-directed Zephyr Press, a non-profit literary publishing house that focuses on contemporary works in translation from Russia, Eastern Europe, and Asia. He is the translation editor of Contemporary Russian Poetry, and the editor of In the Grip of Strange Thoughts: Russian Poetry in a New Era. He was the president of the American Literary Translators Association.

== Life ==
Kates grew up in Elmsford and White Plains, New York. He attended Hackley School in Tarrytown and graduated from White Plains High School in 1963. He volunteered for the Mississippi Summer Project after his freshman year at Wesleyan University in 1964, helping to implement a special court order encouraging voter registration in Panola County. In the fall of 1964, he organized a Friends of the SNCC/COFO in Paris, France, to support the work of the American civil rights movement. He returned to America in 1965 to work in Natchez, Mississippi. He later became a public school teacher, a non-violence trainer for interpersonal and political movements, and a poet and literary translator.

He is married to Helen Safronsky Kates. They have two children, Stanislav (1986) and Paula (1994).

== Awards ==
- 1984 National Endowment for the Arts Creative Writing Fellowship in Poetry
- 1995 Individual Artist Fellowship from the New Hampshire State Council on the Arts
- 2006 National Endowment for the Arts Translation Project Fellowship
- 2013 Cliff Becker Book Prize in Translation
- 2017 National Endowment for the Arts, Translation Project Fellowship
- 2018 Käpylä Translation Prize
- 2022 Der Hovanessian Prize in Translation

== Published works ==
poetry

- Mappemonde (Oyster River Press)
- Metes and Bounds (Accents Publishing)
- The Old Testament (Cold Hub Press)
- The Briar Patch (Hobblebush Books)
- Places of Permanent Shade (Accents Publishing)

translations

- Sixty Years (poems by Mikhail Yeryomin) Black Widow Press: 2022
- Paper-thin Skin (poems by Aigerim Tazhi) Zephyr Press: 2019
- I Have Invented Nothing (poems by Jean-Pierre Rosnay) Black Widow Press: 2018
- Muddy River (poems by Sergey Stratanovsky) Carcanet Press: 2016
- Thirty-nine Rooms (a poem by Nikolai Baitov) Cold Hub Press: 2015
- Selected Poems 1957-2004 (poems by Mikhail Yeryomin) White Pine Press: 2014
- Psalms 1965-1966 (poems by Genrikh Sapgir) Cold Hub Press: 2012
- A Voice Among the Multitudes: Jewish Poets from Latin America, with Stephen A. Sadow, Northeastern University Libraries: 2011
- Live by Fire (poems by Aleksey Porvin) Cold Hub Press: 2011
- An Offshoot of Sense (poems by Tatiana Shcherbina) Cold Hub Press: 2011
- Level with Us (poems by Mikhail Aizenberg) Cold Hub Press: 2011
- Corinthian Copper (poems by Regina Derieva) Marick Press: 2010
- Secret Wars (poems by Jean-Pierre Rosnay) Cold Hub Press: 2010
- When a Poet Sees a Chestnut Tree (poems by Jean-Pierre Rosnay) Green Integer Press: 2009
- Contemporary Russian Poetry (translations editor) Dalkey Archive Press: 2008
- Say Thank You (poems by Mikhail Aizenberg) Zephyr Press: 2007
- Less Than a Meter (poems by Mikhail Aizenberg) Ugly Duckling Presse: 2004
- Las Edades / The Ages (poems by Ricardo Feierstein, with Stephen A. Sadow) Colleción Poesía: 2004
- The Score of the Game (poems by Tatiana Shcherbina) Zephyr Press: 2003
- Self-Portraits and Masks (poems by Isaac Goldemberg, with Stephen A. Sadow) Cross-Cultural Communications: 2002
- In the Grip of Strange Thoughts: Russian Poetry in a New Era (editor) Zephyr Press: 1999
- We, the Generation in the Wilderness (poems by Ricardo Feierstein, with Stephen A. Sadow) Ford-Brown Press: 1989
