= Shadows and Sun =

Shadows and Sun / Ombres et Soleil: Selected Writings (1913–1952) is a comprehensive bilingual collection of the poems of Paul Eluard. Translated by Cicely Buckley and published in 1995 by Oyster River Press, the book is illustrated with the cover art “The dreamer” by Pablo Picasso, and six pen and ink drawings by Picasso, René Magritte, Marc Chagall, and André Lhote. Eluard’s simple language and sensitivity in the early and later love poems, and in the ‘poèmes engagés’ (poems committed to recovering justice for all), earned him the name of “the people’s poet.” Eluard wrote before and after two world wars when he served as medic and infantryman. His poem "Guernica" was written when Picasso created an anti-war painting inspired by the bombing of Guernica during the Spanish Civil War, when Nazis bombed the market place at midday.

This collection of Eluard’s poems includes his early and late poems, and six prose pieces: the Surrealist manifesto of 1925; thoughtful essays on Picasso his friend and Picasso the energetic, innovative artist; essays on “The future of poetry”; “Involuntary poetry and intentional poetry”; and “The poetry of circumstance.” The book also includes "Liberté", which RAF pilots dropped over France during World War II.
