= Orley May =

American detective (1897–1968)

- Born: Orley Nelson May; February 16, 1897; Cleveland, Ohio, U.S.
- Died: January 27, 1968 (aged 70); St. Petersburg, Florida, U.S.
- Other name: "Whitey"
- Spouse: Pearl Sommer (m. 1918)
- Police career
- Department: Cleveland Division of Police
- Service years: 1918–1944
- Rank: Detective

Orley Nelson May (February 16, 1897 – January 27, 1968) was an American detective of the Cleveland Division of Police. He is known for working on several high-profile murders in the city, most notably the Cleveland Torso Murderer case.

== Biography ==
Orley Nelson May was born on February 16, 1897, in Cleveland, Ohio, to Marie (née Samme) and Samuel May. Prior to law enforcement, he worked as a shipping clerk.

May married his wife, Pearl Sommer, in 1918. They had two daughters together: Betty and Dorothy.

=== Career ===
May began working for the Cleveland Division of Police on August 1, 1918. After ten years of service, he was assigned to the department's homicide squad, where he took part in nearly every major murder case in Cleveland between 1928 and 1944.

May was known for wearing a bowler hat, which gave him a "ministerial appearance". He worked on the Cleveland Torso Murderer case, being the first officer on the scene when the first body was discovered.

On July 17, 1944, May resigned, citing ill health caused by a gallbladder ailment. After his resignation, Lieutenant Martin P. Cooney described May as "one of the best in the homicide squad—one of the best in the detective bureau". He also recalled his heroic behavior, such as an incident in which May leaped from a squad car to apprehend a violent criminal.

=== Death ===
May died on January 27, 1968, aged 70, at his home in St. Petersburg, Florida.

== Cited works ==
- Badal, James Jessen (2001). In the Wake of the Butcher: Cleveland's Torso Murders. Kent, Ohio, and London, UK: Kent State University Press. ISBN 0-87338-689-2.
