= Northern Virginia Sun =

Former American newspaper

- Type: Daily newspaper
- Format: Broadsheet
- Owner(s): George W. Ball; Herman Obermayer; Sun Gazette Papers
- Founded: 1930s
- Ceased publication: 1998

The Northern Virginia Sun was a newspaper published in Arlington, Virginia, from the 1930s until 1998. For much of its life, it was a six-day-a-week broadsheet, published Monday through Saturday, that emphasized local news.

Its legacy can be seen in the Arlington public library, which has maintained a collection of the Sun's "Then and Now" series about Arlington landmarks and history. These began appearing in the Sun in the 1950s and continued, on and off, through the 1980s.

The Sun's corporate descendant, Sun Gazette Newspapers, was sold to American Community Newspapers in 2005.

The Sun drew national attention in the late 1970s when owner Herman J. Obermayer said the Sun would print the name of accusers in rape cases that came to trial, out of a sense of "fairness" between the two sides. Time magazine reported that Obermayer's policy was "hotly denounced by local feminists, police, prosecutors, hospital officials and nearly all the Sun readers who have written or telephoned Obermayer to comment." Time quoted Benjamin C. Bradlee, executive editor of The Washington Post, as saying, "It's wrong. It's misguided. We wouldn't do it."

== History ==
The Sun began as The Arlington Sun in the 1930s. In 1957, new owners renamed it the Northern Virginia Sun "and moved the entire operation into a former A&P supermarket" at 3409 Wilson Boulevard.

The new owners were mostly well-connected and well-off Democrats "who had fought shoulder to shoulder in the [Adlai E.] Stevenson campaigns" in 1952 and 1956. The four principal partners were George W. Ball, later an under secretary of state in the Kennedy and Johnson administrations; Philip M. Stern, a grandson of Sears, Roebuck chairman Julius Rosenwald and son of a president of New Orleans Cotton Exchange; Clayton Fritchey, a journalist and Democratic operative who, as a reporter for the Cleveland Press, had covered Eliot Ness's campaign to root out police corruption in Cleveland; and Arnold Sagalyn, who signed on as assistant publisher. Stern and Fritchey were alumni of the New Orleans Item, Fritchey's next career stop after Cleveland. Fritchey had been the editor in New Orleans, Stern a reporter and editorial writer.

Other backers of the Sun included Gilbert Hahn, a Republican who was heir to the Hahn shoe store empire and chairman of the D.C. City Council.

"The investment proved to be a disastrous mistake from the beginning," historian James A. Bill wrote.

"Their dream was to turn [the Sun] into a suburban success like Newsday on Long Island, whose concentrated circulation and affluent readership had managed to scare the large New York City newspapers," the author Eleanor Lanahan wrote. But the Washington dailies had deeper penetration in suburban Virginia than the New York dailies did and readers' habits were changing as early-evening television news undercut afternoon newspapers like the Sun, which later billed itself as the "daily hometown newspaper of Arlington, Falls Church and Fairfax."

Compounding the problem, Ball and the Sun's new other owners—along with some of the reporters they hired—were outsiders. Fritchey, for example, lived in the Georgetown section of Washington and was a regular on the dinner-party circuit there, not in Arlington. One of the reporters was Frances Lanahan, the daughter of novelist F. Scott Fitzgerald. "

"The staff … was young and underpaid," or worse, unsophisticated and unaware. The nationally syndicated columnist Drew Pearson ran an item about Fritchey in 1958 that did not reflect well on the Sun's staff. Gov. W. Averell Harriman had called the Sun, looking for Fritchey. The person who took Harriman's call did not know who Fritchey was.

By 1960, Fritchey left the Sun. "The paper had been losing money, and management decided that the readership had been too transient. Arlington was a temporary stop for airline stewardesses, Pentagon employees and foreign service people who had no investment in the schools as most of their children weren't educated there. Too few residents of Northern Virginia were calling it a home. Also, the Sun had never been able to attract major advertisers. Supermarkets and department stores had concentrated on the wider circulation of the metropolitan papers. Compounding the problem, in 1960 the newspaper union went on strike for higher wages and selected the Sun, as one of the weaker papers, to make its point. [the Sun] brought in scabs, which was unsettling for the liberal, pro-union management, who had to cross their picket lines to get to work. The strike was so costly that it precipitated the sale of the paper."

Ball's family "never forgot the enormity of the failure," according to historian James A. Bill. "Thirty years later, George would wince when the newspaper was mentioned. It was estimated that this white elephant cost George Ball half a million dollars." Bill estimated the Sun's quarterly loss at $100,000 in 1961, after Ball, Stern, Fritchey and Sagakyn had severed their ties to the Sun.

Herman J. Obermayer, editor and publisher of the Long Branch Daily Record in New Jersey, bought the Sun in 1963 and controlled it for 25 years. Like Stern and Fritchey, he was an alumnus of the New Orleans Item. He had worked there in the 1950s, as classified advertising manager. Obermayer, a decorated World War II veteran who had graduated from Dartmouth College, had begun his career as a reporter on the Long Island Daily Press in Queens, New York.

In the early 1970s the Sun moved to a brick-and-concrete building at 1227 North Ivy Street. It left in 1990 when the paper was taken over by Sun Gazette Newspapers of Vienna, Va., and the building changed to uses other than newspapering.

== Former staff ==
Fritchey, who had been spokesman for Adlai E. Stevenson's presidential campaign in 1952, went back to work for Stevenson in the Kennedy administration, when Stevenson was the chief United States delegate to the United Nations. He hired Fritchey as director of public affairs for the United States mission to the U.N. Later Fritchey a nationally syndicated newspaper column. He retired in 1984.

Stern went on to found the Fund for Investigative Journalism. He also used his family foundation to advance causes and organizations he believed in. Ralph Nader described Stern as the "most creative, versatile and persistent philanthropist of our generation." His family foundation gave reporter Seymour M. Hersh a grant in 1969 when he was digging into the story of the My Lai Massacre in Vietnam. Stern foundation money also went to the Government Accountability Project, Teamsters for a Democratic Union, the Center for Science in the Public Interest and the Women's Legal Defense Fund, among others.

Other reporters at the Sun when Stern and Fritchey were in charge included Helen Dewar, later a congressional reporter for The Washington Post; Marianne Means, later a political columnist for the Hearst syndicate; and Shirley Elder, later chief congressional correspondent for the Washington Star. Dewar, who had just graduated from Stanford, joined the Sun after one week at the Washington Post in 1958. She covered education for two years before she went back to the Post in 1961.

Ralph Temples became executive editor in mid-1961. He had been executive city editor of the Palm Beach Post-Times in Florida. From the mid-1960s to and the early 1970s, the paper's day-to-day coverage was supervised by Carol Griffee, who was initially city editor, then executive editor, according to an interview with her conducted for a University of Arkansas project on the Arkansas Gazette, where she worked as a reporter after she left the Sun. Griffee was the daughter of a makeup editor at the Evening Star in Washington and worked as a reporter at the Star starting in 1963, covering Fairfax County and the Virginia General Assembly. She left the Star in 1966 and after working briefly on Capitol Hill, went to the Sun.

In 1971, Griffee arranged a leave of absence and tried politics, campaigning for a seat on the Fairfax County Board of Supervisors. She lost by 14 votes. She returned to the Sun, where, she said, "the publisher completely botched the switch-over from hot type to cold type, and I was just--I was just a basket case. I was so tired, so sleep deprived, just so burned out, that I finally said, 'I've got to get out of here.'" She finally left at the end of 1972.

One of Griffee's reporters at the Sun was Christopher Dodd, who worked at the Sun before he left to attend law school. He eventually became a U.S. senator from Connecticut and chairman of the Senate Banking Committee. Another former Sun reporter was William M. Reddig Jr., later a reporter at the Evening Star in Washington and an editor at Newsweek and Forbes. Hank Burchard was a reporter at the Sun before joining The Washington Post, where he worked for more than 30 years. Vin Suprynowicz was a managing editor of the Sun during the late 1970s.

Herman J. Obermayer was publisher of the Sun until it was sold to the Sun Gazette Papers 1988. Obermayer has recently written a personal memoir about the late Supreme Court Chief Justice William Rehnquist, Rehnquist: A Personal Portrait of the Distinguished Chief Justice of the United States. In 1977 Obermayer became the first openly Jewish member of the Washington Golf and Country Club.

== References and further reading ==
Bibliography

- Lanahan, Eleanor (1995). Scottie: Daughter Of. New York: HarperCollins. ISBN 0-06-092738-0.
- Bill, James A. (1998). George Ball: Behind the Scenes in U.S. Foreign Policy. New Haven: Yale University Press. ISBN 0-300-07646-0.
