= George S. Patton slapping incidents =

1943 incidents during the WW2 Allied invasion of Sicily

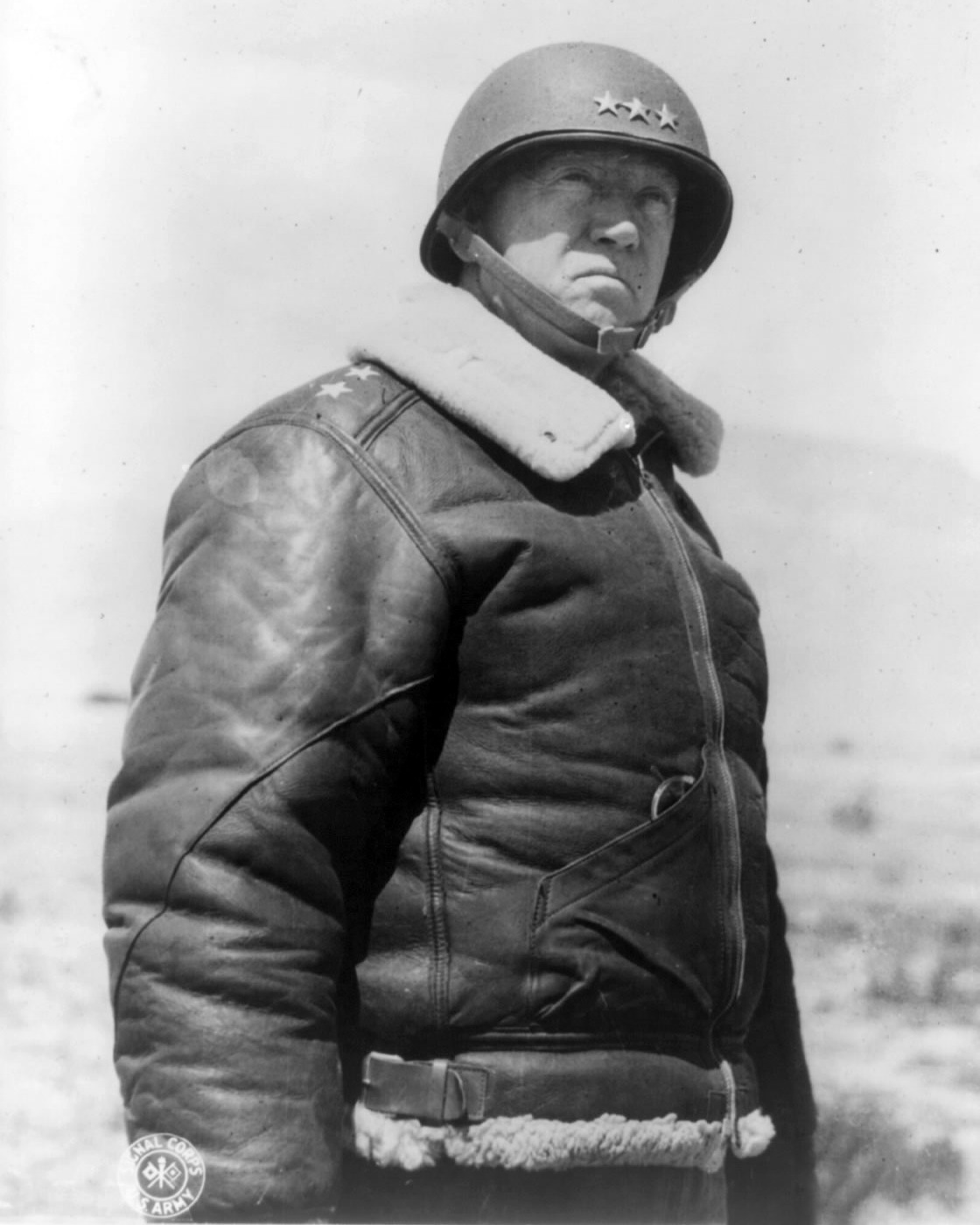
Lieutenant General George S. Patton, commander of the Seventh United States Army, in 1943

In early August 1943, Lieutenant General George S. Patton slapped two United States Army soldiers under his command during the Allied invasion of Sicily of World War II. Patton's hard-driving personality and lack of belief in the medical condition of combat stress reaction, then known as "battle fatigue" or "shell shock," led to the soldiers' becoming the subject of his ire in incidents on August 3 and 10, when Patton struck and berated them after discovering they were patients at evacuation hospitals away from the front lines without apparent physical injuries.

Word of the incidents spread, eventually reaching Patton's superior, General Dwight D. Eisenhower, who ordered him to apologize to the men. Patton's actions were initially suppressed in the news until journalist Drew Pearson publicized them in the United States. The reactions of the U.S. Congress and the general public were divided between support and disdain for Patton's actions. Eisenhower and Army Chief of Staff George C. Marshall opted not to fire Patton as a commander.

Seizing the opportunity the predicament presented, Eisenhower used Patton as a decoy in Operation Fortitude, sending faulty intelligence to German agents that Patton was leading Operation Overlord, the Allied invasion of Europe. While Patton eventually returned to combat command in the European Theater in mid-1944, the slapping incidents were seen by Eisenhower, Marshall, and other leaders to be examples of Patton's brashness and impulsivity.

== Background ==
The Allied invasion of Sicily began on July 10, 1943, with Lieutenant General George S. Patton leading 90,000 men of the Seventh United States Army in a landing near Gela, Scoglitti, and Licata to support landings to the north by the British Eighth Army under General Bernard Montgomery. Initially ordered to protect the Eighth Army's flank, Patton's troops took Palermo after Montgomery's forces were slowed by heavy German and Italian resistance. Patton then set his sights on Messina. He sought an amphibious assault, but it was delayed by lack of landing craft and his troops did not land in Santo Stefano Island until August 8, by which time the Germans and Italians had already evacuated the bulk of their troops to mainland Italy. Throughout the invasion, Patton's troops were heavily engaged by German and Italian forces as they pushed across the island.

Patton had already developed a reputation within the U.S. Army as an effective, successful, and hard-driving commander, punishing subordinates for the slightest infractions but also rewarding them when they performed well. As a way to promote an image that inspired his troops, Patton created a larger-than-life personality. He became known for his flashy dress, highly polished helmet and boots, and no-nonsense demeanor. General Dwight D. Eisenhower, the commander of the invasion of Sicily and Patton's friend and commanding officer, had long known of Patton's colorful leadership style, and also knew that Patton was prone to impulsiveness and a lack of self-restraint.

=== Battle fatigue ===
Prior to World War I, the U.S. Army considered the symptoms of battle fatigue to be cowardice or attempts to avoid combat duty. Soldiers who reported these symptoms received harsh treatment. "Shell shock" had been diagnosed as a medical condition during World War I. But even before the conflict ended, what constituted shell shock was changing. This included the idea that it was caused by the shock of exploding shells. By World War II soldiers were usually diagnosed with "psychoneurosis" or "combat fatigue." Despite this, "shell shock" remained in the popular vocabulary. But the symptoms of what constituted combat fatigue were broader than what had constituted shell shock in World War I. By the time of the invasion of Sicily, the U.S. Army was initially classifying all psychological casualties as "exhaustion" which many still called shell shock. While the causes, symptoms, and effects of the condition were familiar to physicians by the time of the two incidents, it was generally less understood in military circles.

An important lesson from the Tunisian campaign was that neuropsychiatric casualties had to be treated as soon as possible and not evacuated from the combat zone. This was not done in the early stages of the invasion of Sicily, and large numbers of neuropsychiatric casualties were evacuated to North Africa, with the result that treatment became complicated and only 15 percent of them were returned to duty. As the invasion wore on, the system became better organized and nearly 50 percent were restored to combat duty.

Some time before what would become known as the "slapping incident," Patton spoke with Major General Clarence R. Huebner, the newly appointed commander of the 1st Infantry Division, in which both men served. Patton had asked Huebner for a status report; Huebner replied: "The front lines seem to be thinning out. There seems to be a very large number of 'malingerers' at the hospitals, feigning illness in order to avoid combat duty." For his part, Patton did not believe the condition was real. In a directive issued to commanders on August 5, he forbade "battle fatigue" in the Seventh Army:

It has come to my attention that a very small number of soldiers are going to the hospital on the pretext that they are nervously incapable of combat. Such men are cowards and bring discredit on the army and disgrace to their comrades, whom they heartlessly leave to endure the dangers of battle while they, themselves, use the hospital as a means of escape. You will take measures to see that such cases are not sent to the hospital but dealt with in their units. Those who are not willing to fight will be tried by court-martial for cowardice in the face of the enemy.

— Patton directive to the Seventh Army, August 5, 1943

== Incidents ==
=== August 3 ===
Private Charles H. Kuhl, 27, of L Company, U.S. 26th Infantry Regiment, reported to an aid station of C Company, 1st Medical Battalion, on August 2, 1943. Kuhl, who had been in the U.S. Army for eight months, had been attached to the 1st Infantry Division since June 2, 1943. He was diagnosed with "exhaustion," a diagnosis he had been given three times since the start of the campaign. From the aid station, he was evacuated to a medical company and given sodium amytal. Notes in his medical chart indicated "psychoneurosis anxiety state, moderately severe (soldier has been twice before in hospital within ten days. He can't take it at the front, evidently. He is repeatedly returned.)" Kuhl was transferred from the aid station to the 15th Evacuation Hospital near Nicosia for further evaluation.

Patton arrived at the hospital the same day, accompanied by a number of medical officers, as part of his tour of the U.S. II Corps troops. He spoke to some patients in the hospital, commending the physically wounded. He then approached Kuhl, who did not appear to be physically injured. Kuhl was sitting slouched on a stool midway through a tent ward filled with injured soldiers. When Patton asked Kuhl where he was hurt, Kuhl reportedly shrugged and replied that he was "nervous" rather than wounded, adding, "I guess I can't take it." Patton "immediately flared up," slapped Kuhl across the chin with his gloves, then grabbed him by the collar and dragged him to the tent entrance. He shoved him out of the tent with a kick to his backside. Yelling "Don't admit this son of a bitch," Patton demanded that Kuhl be sent back to the front, adding, "You hear me, you gutless bastard? You're going back to the front."

Corpsmen picked up Kuhl and brought him to a ward tent, where it was discovered he had a temperature of 102.2 °F (39.0 °C); and was later diagnosed with malarial parasites. Speaking later of the incident, Kuhl noted "at the time it happened, [Patton] was pretty well worn out ... I think he was suffering a little battle fatigue himself." Kuhl wrote to his parents about the incident, but asked them to "just forget about it." That night, Patton recorded the incident in his diary: "[I met] the only errant coward I have ever seen in this Army. Companies should deal with such men, and if they shirk their duty, they should be tried for cowardice and shot."

Patton was accompanied in this visit by Major General John P. Lucas, who saw nothing remarkable about the incident. After the war he wrote:

There are always a certain number of such weaklings in any Army, and I suppose the modern doctor is correct in classifying them as ill and treating them as such. However, the man with malaria doesn't pass his condition on to his comrades as rapidly as does the man with cold feet nor does malaria have the lethal effect that the latter has.

Patton was further heard by war correspondent Noel Monks angrily claiming that shell shock is "an invention of the Jews."

=== August 10 ===
Private Paul G. Bennett, 21, of C Battery, U.S. 17th Field Artillery Regiment, was a four-year veteran of the U.S. Army, and had served in the division since March 1943. Records show he had no medical history until August 6, 1943, when a friend was wounded in combat. According to a report, he "could not sleep and was nervous." Bennett was brought to the 93rd Evacuation Hospital. In addition to having a fever, he exhibited symptoms of dehydration, including fatigue, confusion, and listlessness. His request to return to his unit was turned down by medical officers. A medical officer described Bennett's condition:

The shells going over him bothered him. The next day he was worried about his buddy and became more nervous. He was sent down to the rear echelon by a battery aid man and there the medical aid man gave him some tranquilizers that made him sleep, but still he was nervous and disturbed. On the next day the medical officer ordered him to be evacuated, although the boy begged not to be evacuated because he did not want to leave his unit.

On August 10, Patton entered the receiving tent of the hospital, speaking to the injured there. Patton approached Bennett, who was huddled and shivering, and asked what the trouble was. "It's my nerves," Bennett responded. "I can't stand the shelling anymore." Patton reportedly became enraged at him, slapping him across the face. He began yelling: "Your nerves, Hell, you are just a goddamned coward. Shut up that goddamned crying. I won't have these brave men who have been shot at seeing this yellow bastard sitting here crying." Patton then reportedly slapped Bennett again, knocking his helmet liner off, and ordered the receiving officer, Major Charles B. Etter, not to admit him. Patton then threatened Bennett, "You're going back to the front lines, and you may get shot and killed, but you're going to fight. If you don't, I'll stand you up against a wall and have a firing squad kill you on purpose. In fact, I ought to shoot you myself, you goddamned whimpering coward." Upon saying this, Patton pulled out his pistol threateningly, prompting the hospital's commander, Colonel Donald E. Currier, to physically separate the two. Patton left the tent, yelling to medical officers to send Bennett back to the front lines.

As he toured the remainder of the hospital, Patton continued discussing Bennett's condition with Currier. Patton stated, "I can't help it. It makes my blood boil to think of a yellow bastard being babied," and "I won't have those cowardly bastards hanging around our hospitals. We'll probably have to shoot them some time anyway, or we'll raise a breed of morons."

== Aftermath ==
=== Private reprimand and apologies ===
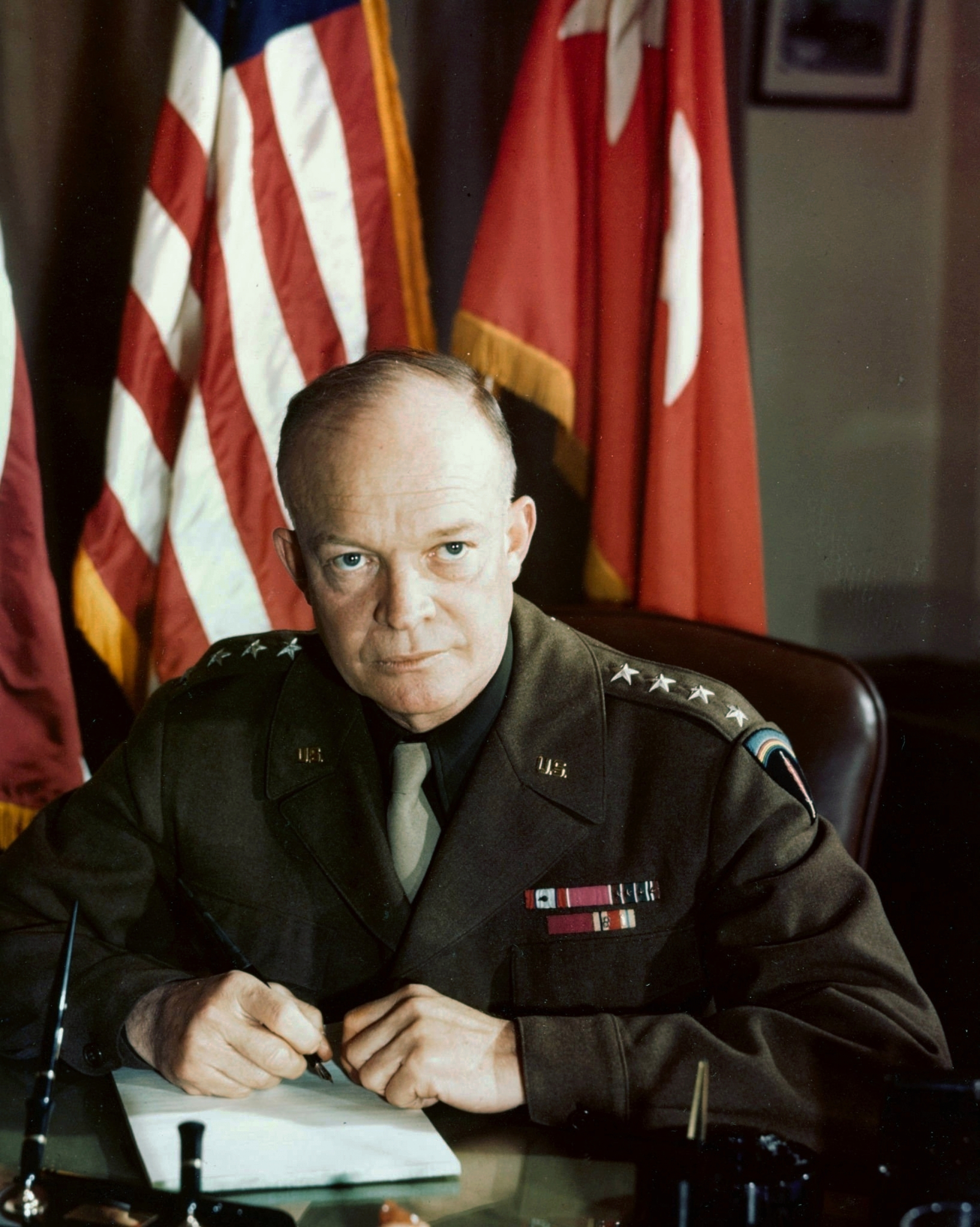
General Dwight Eisenhower, commander of the Sicily invasion and Patton's superior, in 1943. Eisenhower privately criticized Patton for the incidents, but refused to remove him completely from command.

The August 10 incident—particularly the sight of Patton threatening a subordinate with a pistol—upset many of the medical staff present. The II Corps surgeon, Colonel Richard T. Arnest, submitted a report on the incident to Brigadier General William B. Kean, chief of staff of II Corps, who submitted it to Lieutenant General Omar Bradley, commander of II Corps. Bradley, out of loyalty to Patton, did nothing more than lock the report in his safe. Arnest also sent the report through medical channels to Brigadier General Frederick A. Blesse, General Surgeon of Allied Force Headquarters, who then submitted it to Eisenhower, who received it on August 16. Eisenhower ordered Blesse to proceed immediately to Patton's command to ascertain the truth of the allegations. Eisenhower also formulated a delegation, including Major General John P. Lucas, two colonels from the Inspector General's office, and a theater medical consultant, Lieutenant Colonel Perrin H. Long, to investigate the incident and interview those involved. Long interviewed medical personnel who witnessed each incident, then filed a report entitled "Mistreatment of Patients in Receiving Tents of the 15th and 93rd Evacuation Hospitals" which extensively detailed Patton's actions at both hospitals.

By August 18, Eisenhower had ordered that Patton's Seventh Army be broken up with a few of its units remaining garrisoned in Sicily. The majority of its combat forces would be transferred to the Fifth United States Army under Lieutenant General Mark W. Clark. This had already been planned by Eisenhower who had previously told Patton that his Seventh Army would not be part of the upcoming Allied invasion of Italy, scheduled for September. On August 20, Patton received a cable from Eisenhower regarding the arrival of Lucas at Palermo. Eisenhower told Patton it was "highly important" that he personally meet with Lucas as soon as possible, as Lucas would be carrying an important message. Before Lucas arrived, Blesse arrived from Algiers to look into the health of the troops in Sicily. He was also ordered by Eisenhower to deliver a secret letter to Patton and investigate its allegations. In the letter, Eisenhower told Patton he had been informed of the slapping incidents. He said he would not be opening a formal investigation into the matter, but his criticism of Patton was sharp.

Eisenhower's letter to Patton, dated August 17, 1943:

I clearly understand that firm and drastic measures are at times necessary in order to secure the desired objectives. But this does not excuse brutality, abuse of the sick, nor exhibition of uncontrollable temper in front of subordinates. ... I feel that the personal services you have rendered the United States and the Allied cause during the past weeks are of incalculable value; but nevertheless if there is a very considerable element of truth in the allegations accompanying this letter, I must so seriously question your good judgment and your self-discipline as to raise serious doubts in my mind as to your future usefulness.

Eisenhower noted that no formal record of the incidents would be retained at Allied Headquarters, save in his own secret files. Still, he strongly suggested Patton apologize to all involved. On August 21, Patton brought Bennett into his office; he apologized and the men shook hands. On August 22, he met with Currier as well as the medical staff who had witnessed the events in each unit and expressed regret for his "impulsive actions." Patton related to the medical staff a story of a friend from World War I who had committed suicide after "skulking"; he stated he sought to prevent any recurrence of such an event. On August 23, he brought Kuhl into his office, apologized, and shook hands with him as well. After the apology, Kuhl said he thought Patton was "a great general," and that "at the time, he didn't know how sick I was." Currier later said Patton's remarks sounded like "no apology at all [but rather like] an attempt to justify what he had done." Patton wrote in his diary that he loathed making the apologies, particularly when he was told by Bennett's brigade commander, Brigadier General John A. Crane, that Bennett had gone absent without leave (AWOL) and arrived at the hospital by "falsely representing his condition." Patton wrote, "It is rather a commentary on justice when an Army commander has to soft-soap a skulker to placate the timidity of those above." As word of the actions had spread informally among troops of the Seventh Army, Patton drove to each division under his command between August 24 and 30 and gave a 15-minute speech in which he praised their behavior and apologized for any instances where he had been too harsh on soldiers, making only vague reference to the two slapping incidents. In his final apology speech to the U.S. 3rd Infantry Division, Patton was overcome with emotion when the soldiers supportively began to chant "No, general, no, no," to prevent him from having to apologize.

In a letter to General George Marshall on August 24, Eisenhower praised Patton's exploits as commander of the Seventh Army and his conduct of the Sicily campaign, particularly his ability to take initiative as a commander. Still, Eisenhower noted Patton continued "to exhibit some of those unfortunate traits of which you and I have always known." He informed Marshall of the two incidents and his requirement that Patton apologize. Eisenhower stated he believed Patton would cease his behavior "because fundamentally, he is so avid for recognition as a great military commander that he will ruthlessly suppress any habit of his that will tend to jeopardize it." When Eisenhower arrived in Sicily to award Montgomery the Legion of Merit on August 29, Patton gave Eisenhower a letter expressing his remorse about the incidents.

=== Media attention ===
Word of the slapping incidents spread informally among soldiers before eventually circulating to war correspondents. One of the nurses who witnessed the August 10 incident apparently told her boyfriend, a captain in the Seventh Army public affairs detachment. Through him, a group of four journalists covering the Sicily operation heard of the incident: Demaree Bess of the Saturday Evening Post, Merrill Mueller of NBC News, Al Newman of Newsweek, and John Charles Daly of CBS News. The four journalists interviewed Etter and other witnesses, but decided to bring the matter to Eisenhower instead of filing the story with their editors. Bess, Mueller, and Quentin Reynolds of Collier's Magazine flew from Sicily to Algiers, and on August 19, Bess gave a summary on the slapping incidents to Eisenhower's chief of staff, Major General Walter Bedell Smith. The reporters asked Eisenhower directly about the incident, and Eisenhower requested that the story be suppressed because the war effort could not afford to lose Patton. Bess and other journalists initially complied. However, the news reporters then demanded Eisenhower fire Patton in exchange for them not reporting the story, a demand which Eisenhower refused.

The story of Kuhl's slapping broke in the U.S. when newspaper columnist Drew Pearson revealed it on his November 21 radio program. Pearson received details of the Kuhl incident and other material on Patton from his friend Ernest Cuneo, an official with the Office of Strategic Services, who obtained the information from War Department files and correspondence. Pearson's version not only conflated details of both slapping incidents but falsely reported that the private in question was visibly "out of his head," telling Patton to "duck down or the shells would hit him" and that in response "Patton struck the soldier, knocking him down." Pearson punctuated his broadcast by twice stating that Patton would never again be used in combat, despite the fact that Pearson had no factual basis for this prediction. In response, Allied Headquarters denied that Patton had received an official reprimand, but confirmed that Patton had slapped at least one soldier.

Patton's wife, Beatrice Patton, spoke to the media to defend him. She appeared in True Confessions, a women's confession magazine, where she characterized Patton as "the toughest, most hard boiled General in the U.S. Army ... but he's quite sweet, really." She was featured in a Washington Post article on November 26. While she did not attempt to justify Patton's action, she characterized him as a "tough perfectionist," stating that he cared deeply about the men under his command and would not ask them to do something he would not do himself:

He had been known to weep at men's graves—as well as tear their hides off. The deed is done and the mistake made, and I'm sure Georgie is sorrier and has punished himself more than anyone could possibly realize. I've known George Patton for 31 years and I've never known him to be deliberately unfair. He's made mistakes—and he's paid for them. This was a big mistake, and he's paying a big price for it.

— Beatrice Patton in the Washington Post, November 25, 1943

=== Public response ===
Demands for Patton to be relieved of duty and sent home were made in Congress and in newspapers across the country. U.S. Representative Jed Johnson of Oklahoma's 6th district described Patton's actions as a "despicable incident" and was "amazed and chagrined" Patton was still in command. He called for the general's immediate dismissal on the grounds that his actions rendered him no longer useful to the war effort. Representative Charles B. Hoeven of Iowa's 9th district said on the House floor that parents of soldiers need no longer worry of their children being abused by "hard boiled officers." He wondered whether the Army had "too much blood and guts." Eisenhower submitted a report to Secretary of War Henry L. Stimson, who presented it to Senator Robert R. Reynolds, Chairman of the Senate Committee on Military Affairs. The report laid out Eisenhower's response to the incident and gave details of Patton's decades of military service. Eisenhower concluded that Patton was invaluable to the war effort and that he was confident the corrective actions taken would be adequate. Investigators Eisenhower sent to Patton's command found the general remained overwhelmingly popular with his troops.

By mid-December, the government had received around 1,500 letters related to Patton, with many calling for his dismissal and others defending him or calling for his promotion. Kuhl's father, Herman F. Kuhl, wrote to his own congressman, stating that he forgave Patton for the incident and requesting that he not be disciplined. Retired generals also weighed in on the matter. Former Army Chief of Staff Charles P. Summerall wrote to Patton that he was "indignant about the publicity given a trifling incident," adding that "whatever [Patton] did" he was sure it was "justified by the provocation. Such cowards used to be shot, now they are only encouraged." Major General Kenyon A. Joyce, another combat commander and one of Patton's friends, attacked Pearson as a "sensation mongerer," stating that "niceties" should be left for "softer times of peace." In one notable dissension, Patton's friend, former mentor and General of the Armies John J. Pershing publicly condemned his actions, an act that left Patton "deeply hurt" and caused him to never speak to Pershing again.

After consulting with Marshall, Stimson, and Assistant Secretary of War John J. McCloy, Eisenhower retained Patton in the European theater, though his Seventh Army saw no further combat. Patton remained in Sicily for the rest of the year. Marshall and Stimson not only supported Eisenhower's decision, but defended it. In a letter to the U.S. Senate, Stimson stated that Patton must be retained because of the need for his "aggressive, winning leadership in the bitter battles which are to come before final victory." Stimson acknowledged retaining Patton was a poor move for public relations but remained confident it was the right decision militarily.

== Effect on plans for invasion of Europe ==
Contrary to his statements to Patton, Eisenhower never seriously considered removing the general from duty in the European Theater. Writing of the incident before the media attention, he said, "If this thing ever gets out, they'll be howling for Patton's scalp, and that will be the end of Georgie's service in this war. I simply cannot let that happen. Patton is indispensable to the war effort – one of the guarantors of our victory." Still, following the capture of Messina in August 1943, Patton did not command a force in combat for 11 months.

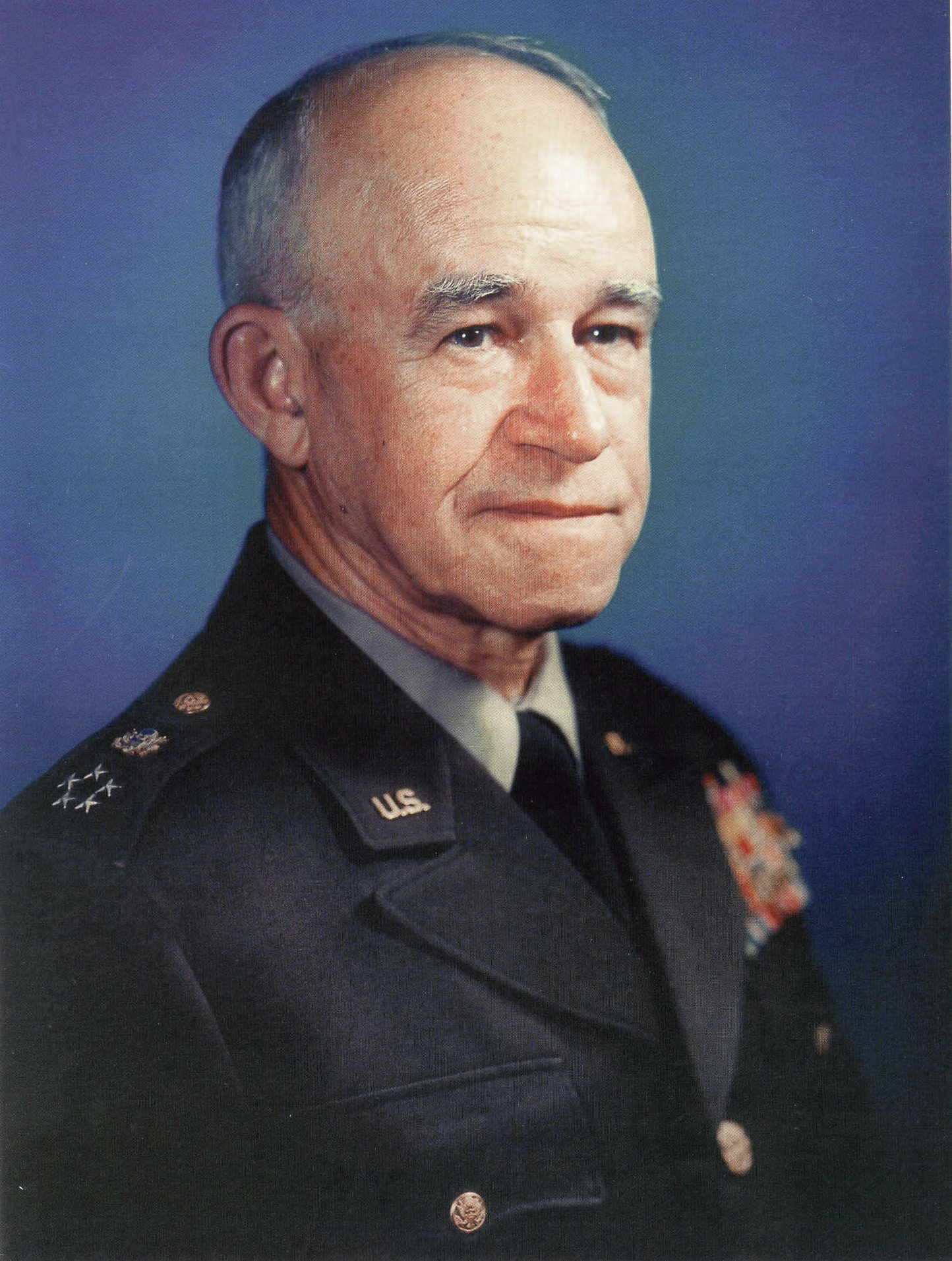
Omar Bradley, whom Eisenhower selected to lead the US ground forces on the invasion of Normandy over Patton. Bradley, Patton's former subordinate, would become Patton's superior in the final months of the war.

Patton was passed over to lead the invasion in northern Europe. In September, Bradley — Patton's junior in both rank and experience — was selected to command the First United States Army that was forming in England to prepare for Operation Overlord. According to Eisenhower, this decision had been made months before the slapping incidents became public knowledge, but Patton felt they were the reason he was denied the command. Eisenhower had already decided on Bradley because he felt the invasion of Europe was too important to risk any uncertainty. While Eisenhower and Marshall both considered Patton to be a superb corps-level combat commander, Bradley possessed two of the traits that a theater-level strategic command required, and that Patton conspicuously lacked: a calm, reasoned demeanor, and a meticulously consistent nature. The slapping incidents had only further confirmed to Eisenhower that Patton lacked the ability to exercise discipline and self-control at such a command level. Still, Eisenhower re-emphasized his confidence in Patton's skill as a ground combat commander by recommending him for promotion to four-star general in a private letter to Marshall on September 8, noting his previous combat exploits and admitting that he had a "driving power" that Bradley lacked.

By mid-December, Eisenhower had been appointed Supreme Allied Commander in Europe and moved to England. As media attention surrounding the incident began to subside, McCloy told Patton he would indeed be eventually returning to combat command. Patton was briefly considered to lead the Seventh Army in Operation Dragoon, but Eisenhower felt his experience would be more useful in the Normandy campaign. Eisenhower and Marshall privately agreed that Patton would command a follow-on field army after Bradley's army conducted the initial invasion of Normandy; Bradley would then command the resulting army group. Patton was told on January 1, 1944 only that he would be relieved of command of the Seventh Army and moved to Europe. In his diary, he wrote that he would resign if he was not given command of a field army. On January 26, 1944, formally given command of a newly arrived unit, the Third United States Army, he went to the United Kingdom to prepare the unit's inexperienced soldiers for combat. This duty occupied Patton throughout early 1944.

Exploiting Patton's situation, Eisenhower sent him on several high-profile trips throughout the Mediterranean in late 1943. He traveled to Algiers, Tunis, Corsica, Cairo, Jerusalem, and Malta in an effort to confuse German commanders as to where the Allied forces might next attack. By the next year, the German High Command still had more respect for Patton than for any other Allied commander and considered him central to any plan to invade Europe from the north. Because of this, Patton was made a central figure in Operation Fortitude in early 1944. The Allies fed the German intelligence organizations, through double agents, a steady stream of false intelligence that Patton had been named commander of the First United States Army Group (FUSAG) and was preparing for an invasion of Pas de Calais. The FUSAG command was actually an intricately constructed "phantom" army of decoys, props and radio signals based around southeast England to mislead German aircraft and to make Axis leaders believe a large force was massing there. Patton was ordered to keep a low profile to deceive the Germans into thinking he was in Dover throughout early 1944, when he was actually training the Third Army. As a result of Operation Fortitude, the German 15th Army remained at Pas de Calais to defend against the expected attack. The formation remained there even after the invasion of Normandy on June 6, 1944.

It was during the following month of July 1944 that Patton and the Third Army finally did travel to mainland Europe, and entered into combat on August 1.
