= Coro (non-profit organization) =

American nonprofit organization

Coro is an American non-partisan, non-profit organization best known for its fellowship program dedicated to teaching skills useful in leadership in public affairs to young adults.

The organization was founded in San Francisco in 1942 by W. Donald Fletcher, an attorney, and Van Duyn Dodge, an investment counselor. Their premise was based on the realization that, unlike law, business or medicine, post graduate training in the area of leadership was non existent, and they wanted to train young veterans in the leadership skills necessary to assure that our democratic system of government could more effectively meet the needs of its citizens.

Contrary to the assumption that "Coro" refers to the word "core," the name is a nonce word created to represent "both discovery and exploration."

== Coro Fellows Program in Public Affairs ==
The Coro Fellows Program in Public Affairs, the organization's premier fellowship, is a full-time, nine-month (except for San Francisco), graduate-level experiential leadership training program that prepares diverse, talented and committed individuals for effective and ethical leadership in the public affairs arena. The Northern California Fellows Program was shortened to seven months but encompasses the same aspects of other programs.

== Coro Exploring Leadership Program ==
The Coro Exploring Leadership Program is offered in multiple cities, including Oakland, New York, and San Francisco. Launched in 1998, Exploring Leadership (EL) is a full-time summer and part-time academic year program that prepares high school juniors for opportunities in the 21st century workforce and higher education by engaging them to become active citizens and to improve their communities.

== Community and regional programs ==
Each Coro location has developed a variety of full and part-time, community and regionally-based programs aimed at ethical, agile leadership training across sectors and differences.

== Notable alumni ==
Approximately 1,000–1,200 people participate in Coro's various programs each year, many of whom work in non-profit organizations, businesses, and government agencies. Some notable alumni who currently hold or have held public office include:

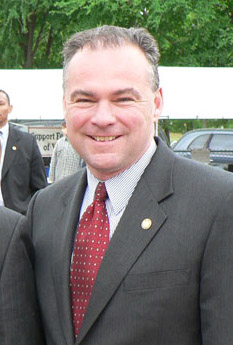
Former Virginia Governor Tim Kaine

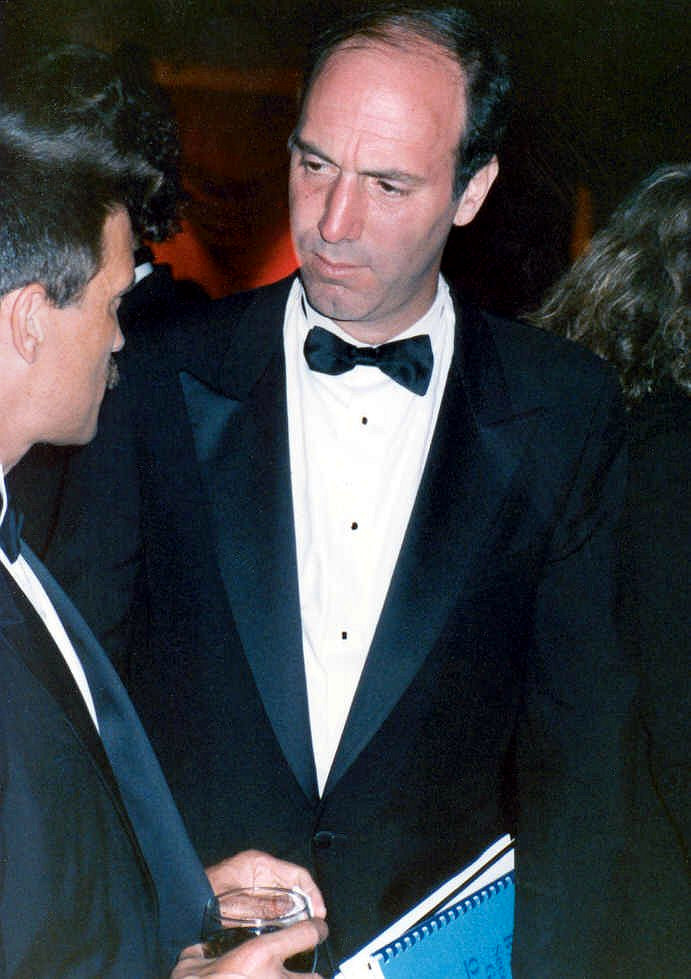
Film critic Gene Siskel

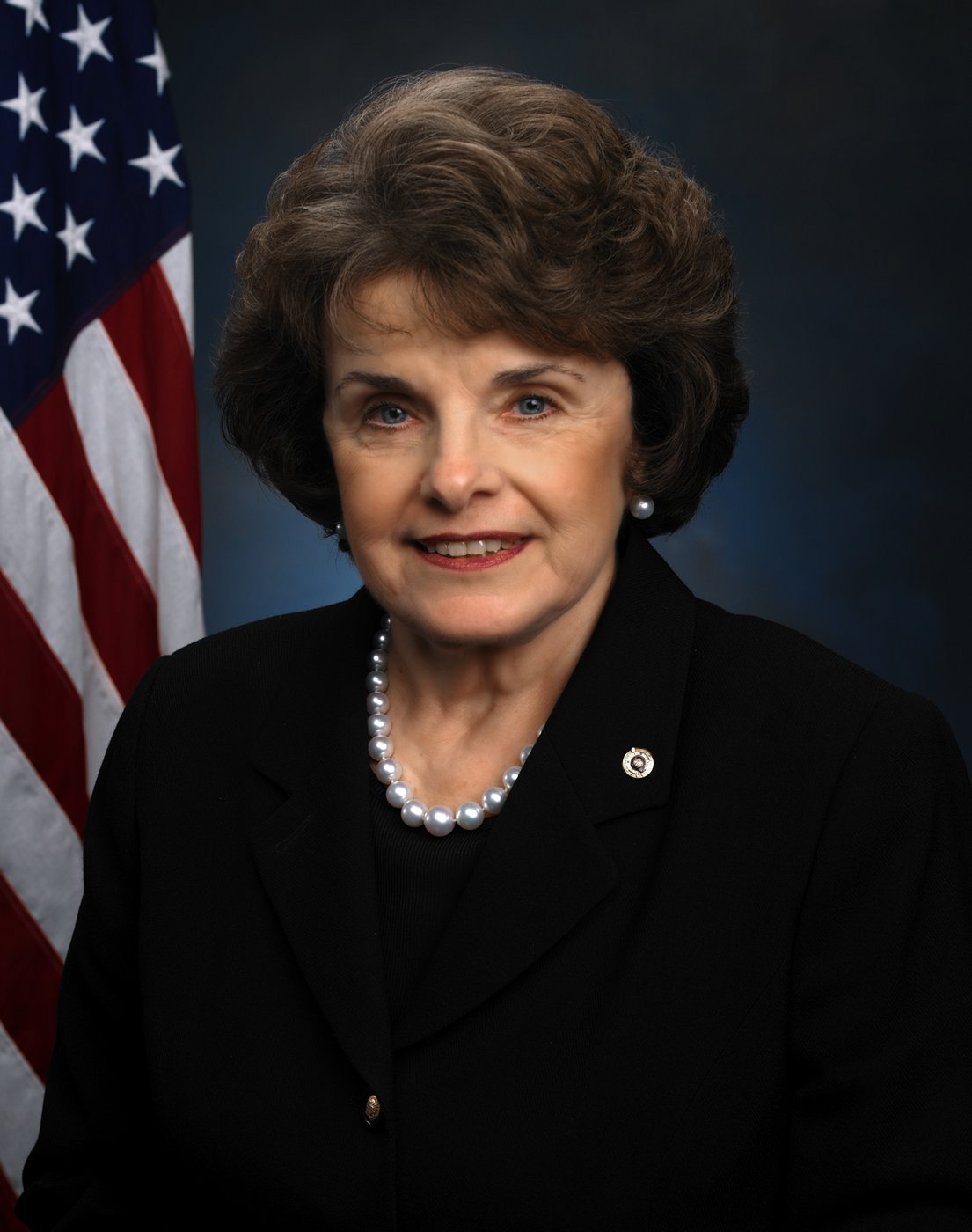
Sen. Dianne Feinstein

- Phil Angelides, former treasurer, State of California (LA '75)
- Marvin R. Baxter, associate justice, Supreme Court of California (SF '63)
- Michael Bennet, member, U.S. Senate, Colorado (NY '88)
- Jeffrey Bleich, U.S. Ambassador to Australia (StL '84)
- Debra Bowen, secretary of state, State of California (LA '89)
- Ben Cannon, education adviser, Governor's Office, Oregon and former member, Oregon House of Representatives (StL '00)
- Helen Dewar, former staff writer, The Washington Post (SF'58)
- Anna Eshoo, member, U.S. House of Representatives (SF '79)
- Vic Fazio, former member, U.S. House of Representatives (LA '66)
- Dianne Feinstein, member, U.S. Senate, California (SF '56)
- Elle Bisgaard-Church, Chief of Staff to the Mayor Zohran Mamdani of New York City (NY '16)
- Tim Kaine, vice presidential nominee, member, U.S. Senate, and former governor, Virginia (KC '78)
- Jerry Lewis, former member, U.S. House of Representatives (SF '57)
- Mike Levin, member, U.S. House of Representatives (LA '02)
- Carol Liu, member, California State Senate (LA '89)
- Holly Mitchell, member, California State Assembly (LA '87)
- John B. Mockler, state secretary of education, California (CA '63)
- Adrin Nazarian, member, California State Assembly
- Alex Padilla, member, U.S. Senate, California (LA '95)
- Jean Quan, mayor, City of Oakland, California (SF '87)
- Gene Siskel, former film critic, Siskel & Ebert At the Movies (LA '68)
