= Hobblebush Books =

Hobblebush Books, founded in 1991, is an independent publisher in Brookline, New Hampshire, that specializes in publishing poetry and regional non-fiction titles.

== Notable authors ==
Notable authors published by Hobblebush Books include J. Kates, Patricia Fargnoli, W. E. Butts, Dan Szczesny, Alice B. Fogel, B. Eugene McCarthy, Sandy Bothmer, Eric Pinder, Jim Salmon, Rodger Martin, Henry Walters, Tom Fitzgerald, Charles W. Pratt, Charles Butterfield, Maudelle Driskell, and Becky Sakellariou.
