= Julia Older =

American poet

- Born: Julia Older
- Occupations: Poet, translator
- Spouse: Steve Sherman
- Writing career
- Language: English
- Genres: Poetry, translations
- Notable works: The François Vase (Hobblebush Books), Appalachian Odyssey

Julia Older (May 25, 1941 - April 17, 2021) was a poet and an author of essays, fiction, nonfiction and plays. Four of her eleven poetry books are book-length poems, including Tales of the François Vase and the mythical journey of Hermaphroditus in America and Tahirih Unveiled, based on the life of Persia's first women's rights activist.

== Career ==
Older was an independent full-time author of 25 non-fiction, fiction, and poetry books. Her poems, essays, translations, and stories have appeared in over two hundred publications. She also has a history as an editor and book reviewer.

Two novels from Older's Isles of Shoals Trilogy were featured in Reading Group Choices national guidebook: The Island Queen: Celia Thaxter of the Isles of Sholes and This Desired Place, a 17th-century New World saga which won the Independent Publisher Gold Medal for Best Northeast Regional Fiction (New England and New York).

With her partner, the writer Steve Sherman, Older wrote Appalachian Odyssey, which recounts her adventure as the 19th woman to walk the 2000-mile Appalachian Trail. She walked the trail with Sherman. The Authors Guild selected Appalachian Odyssey for their Back-in-Print Series, and it received the National Outdoor Book Awards Classic Honorable Mention as "a lasting book that has proven to be a significant work in the field".

Older's other works appear in Poets & Writers, The New Yorker, Sisters of the Earth: Women Writing about Nature Entelechy International, Amazon Shorts, New Directions, and many other journals and anthologies.

== Translations ==
Older lived and worked in France, Italy, Mexico, and Brazil. She was fluent in French, Italian and Spanish. Her literary translations and commissions include the poems of Sicilian Nobel Prize Winner Salvatore Quasimodo, an anthology of French-African poetry, Tahirih's Persian ghazals, and the story collection Blues for a Black Cat by Boris Vian (University of Nebraska Press French Modernist Series, with a new edition from the French Embassy in New Delhi, India).

== Awards and honors ==
- Hopwood Poetry Award, University of Michigan, 1963
- Mary Roberts Rinehard Grant for Prose
- North Carolina First Poetry Book Grant
- Independent Publisher Bronze Poetry Medal
- Daniel Varoujian Poetry Award
- Iowa Poetry Workshop Fellowship
- Yaddo Fellowship
- MacDowell Colony Fellowship

== Published works ==
- Tales of the François Vase (Hobblebush Books)
- Appalachian Odyssey (Appledore Books)
- Hermaphroditus in America (Appledore Books)
- Tahirih Unveiled (Appledore Books)
- The Island Queen: Celia Thaxter of the Isles of Sholes (Appledore Books)
- This Desired Place (Appledore Books)
