= The Drew Pearson Show =

- Presented by: Drew Pearson
- Country of origin: United States

Production
- Running time: 15 minutes (inc. ads)

Original release
- Network: ABC (May–November 1952); DuMont (December 1952-March 1953)
- Release: May 4, 1952 – March 18, 1953

The Drew Pearson Show is an American television program originally broadcast on ABC and later on the now defunct DuMont Television Network. The series ran from 1952 to 1953. It was a public affairs program hosted by political columnist Drew Pearson.

The program aired Sunday nights at 11 (Eastern Standard Time) on ABC. It was sponsored by Carter Products. When the series moved to the DuMont network, it aired on Wednesday nights at 7:30. The series was cancelled in mid-March 1953.

== See also ==
- List of programs broadcast by the DuMont Television Network
- List of surviving DuMont Television Network broadcasts

== Bibliography ==
- David Weinstein, The Forgotten Network: DuMont and the Birth of American Television (Philadelphia: Temple University Press, 2004) ISBN 1-59213-245-6
- Alex McNeil, Total Television, Fourth edition (New York: Penguin Books, 1980) ISBN 0-14-024916-8
- Tim Brooks and Earle Marsh, The Complete Directory to Prime Time Network and Cable TV Shows 1946–Present, Ninth edition (New York: Ballantine Books, 2007) ISBN 978-0-345-49773-4
