= Drew Pearson (journalist) =

American journalist (1897–1969)

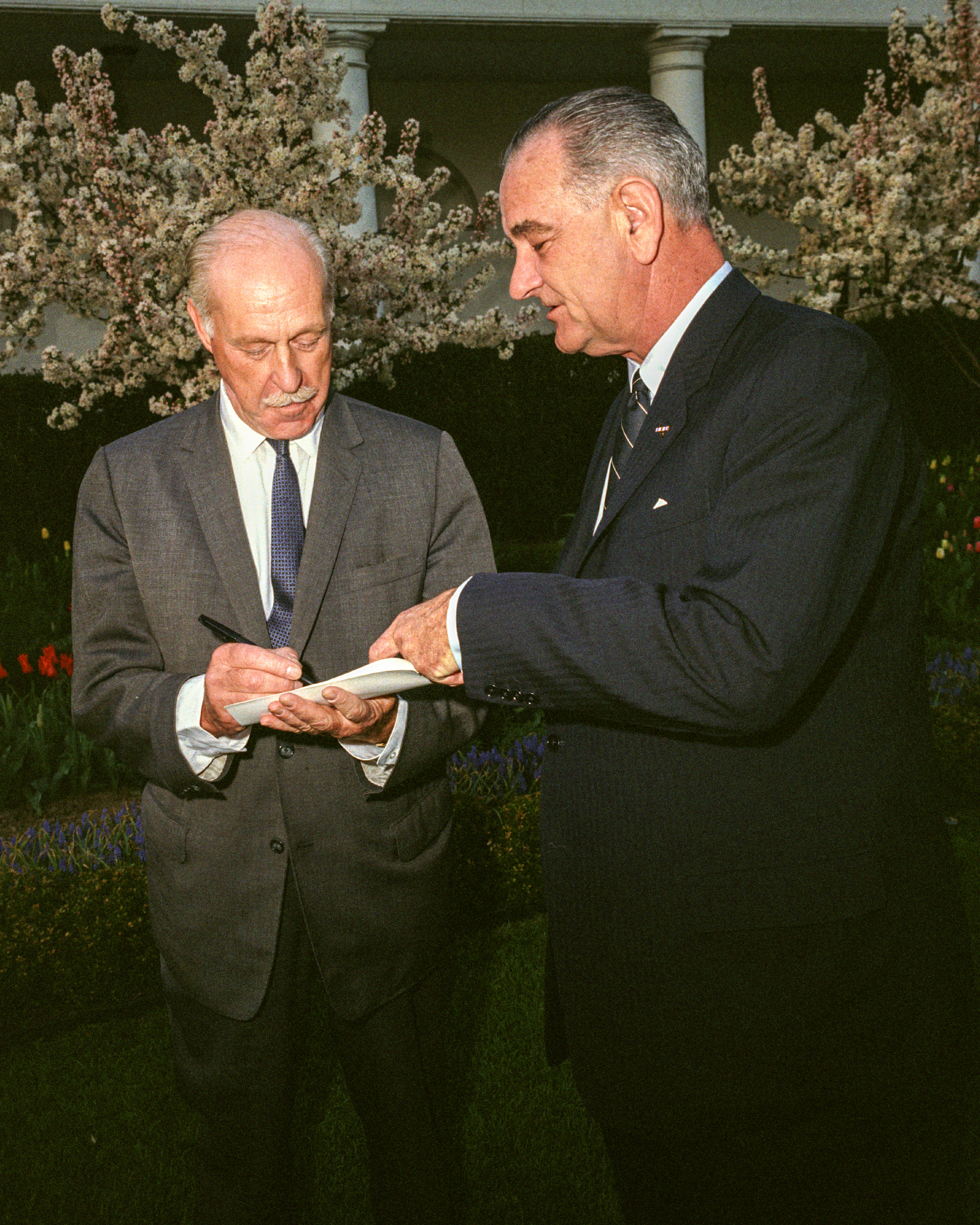
- Pearson (left) with Lyndon Johnson in 1964
- Born: Andrew Russell Pearson; December 13, 1897; Evanston, Illinois, U.S.
- Died: September 1, 1969 (aged 71); Washington, D.C., U.S.
- Resting place: Merry-Go-Round Farms; Potomac, Maryland; 39.05301°N 77.27363°W
- Education: Swarthmore College
- Occupations: Journalist, columnist
- Years active: 1919-1969
- Employer: The Washington Post
- Notable credit(s): Washington Merry-Go-Round, 1932
- Spouses: Felicia Gizycka (m. 1925; div. 1928) Luvie Moore Abell (m. 1936; died 1969)
- Children: 2, including Tyler Abell (stepson)
- Father: Paul Martin Pearson

Andrew Russell Pearson (December 13, 1897 – September 1, 1969) was an American columnist, noted for his syndicated newspaper column "Washington Merry-Go-Round". He also had a program on NBC Radio titled Drew Pearson. He was known for his approach towards high-level politicians, such as senators, cabinet members, generals and American presidents.

== Early life and career ==
Pearson was born in Evanston, Illinois, to Quaker parents Paul Martin Pearson, an English professor at Northwestern University, and Edna Rachel Wolfe Pearson. When Pearson was 6 years old, his father joined the faculty of Swarthmore College as professor of public speaking, and the family moved to Pennsylvania, joining the Society of Friends, with which the college was then affiliated. After being educated at Phillips Exeter Academy, Pearson attended Swarthmore from 1915 until 1919, where he edited its student newspaper, The Phoenix.

From 1919 to 1921, Pearson served with the American Friends Service Committee, directing postwar rebuilding operations in Peć, which at that time was part of Serbia. From 1921 to 1922, he lectured in geography at the University of Pennsylvania.

In 1923, Pearson traveled to Japan, China, New Zealand, Australia, India, and Serbia, and persuaded several newspapers to buy articles about his travels. He was also commissioned by the American "Around the World Syndicate" to produce a set of interviews entitled "Europe's Twelve Greatest Men".

In 1924, he taught industrial geography at Columbia University.

From 1925 to 1928, Pearson continued reporting on international events, including strikes in China, the Geneva Naval Conference, the Pan-American Conference in Havana, and the signing of the Kellogg-Briand Pact in Paris.

In 1929, he became the Washington correspondent for The Baltimore Sun. However, in 1931 and 1932, with Robert S. Allen, he anonymously published a book called Washington Merry-Go-Round and its sequel. When the Sun discovered Pearson had co-authored these books, he was promptly fired. Late in 1932, Pearson and Allen secured a contract with the Scripps–Howard syndicate, United Features, to syndicate a column called "Washington Merry-Go-Round". It first appeared in Eleanor "Cissy" Patterson's Washington Herald on November 17, 1932. But as World War II escalated in Europe, Pearson's strong support of Franklin D. Roosevelt, in opposition to Patterson and the Herald's isolationist position, led to an acrimonious termination of Pearson's and Allen's contract with the Herald. In 1941 The Washington Post picked up the contract for the "Washington Merry-Go-Round".

=== Radio, film, and other media ===
From 1935 to 1936, Allen and Pearson broadcast a 15-minute program twice a week on the Mutual Broadcasting System. They continued with a 30-minute music and news show, Listen America, in 1939–1940, ending this partnership in 1941. They also wrote a comic strip, Hap Hopper, Washington Correspondent, which was drawn from 1939 to 1943 by Jack Sparling, and from 1943 onward by Al Plastino.

Pearson continued alone on NBC with Drew Pearson Comments from 1941 to 1953 for a variety of sponsors (Serutan, Nutrex, Lee Hats, Adam Hats). His commentary was broadcast through 1968 on the now-defunct Intermountain Network.

In addition to radio, Pearson appeared in a number of Hollywood movies, such as RKO's 1945 propaganda movie Betrayal from the East, and the 1951 science fiction film The Day the Earth Stood Still. In the former movie, Pearson referred to an exposé that accused Japanese Americans of being part of a Japanese conspiracy to engage in acts of espionage and terrorism. The movie was based on the 1943 best-selling book Betrayal from the East: The Inside Story of Japanese Spies in America by Alan Hynd. In the latter film, Pearson (playing himself) is the only journalist who urges calm and restraint (versus the fear and paranoia evoked by his colleagues) while Washington is panicked by the escape of the alien visitor Klaatu. Furthermore, Pearson appeared as himself in City Across the River (1949).

In 1947, Drew used his newspaper column and radio to announce his plan for the American Friendship train, a nation-wide humanitarian aid effort ran by the people of America for the people of Europe. In 1952 and 1953, Pearson hosted The Drew Pearson Show on the ABC and DuMont Television networks.

On a January 8, 1950, broadcast of CBS Radio's The Jack Benny Program, Pearson was at the center of a notorious joke. Announcer Don Wilson was to say he heard Jack had bought a new suit on Drew Pearson's program, but misspoke Pearson's name: "Drear Pooson". Later in the show, comedic actor Frank Nelson was asked by Benny if he was the doorman. Nelson replied with a line surreptitiously given him by the show's writers, "Who do you think I am? Drear Pooson?"

== "Washington Merry-Go-Round" ==
The "Merry-Go-Round" column started as a result of Pearson's anonymous publication in 1931 of the book, Washington Merry-Go-Round, co-written with Robert Allen, the Washington bureau chief for The Christian Science Monitor. The book was a collection of muckraking news items concerning key figures in public life that challenged the journalistic code of the day. In 1932 it was followed by a second book, More Merry-Go-Round. Although they were exposed as the publishers and forced to resign their positions, their books were successful enough so that Pearson and Allen could become co-authors of the syndicated column, the "Merry-Go-Round", that same year. Also in 1932, the original book was made into a film of the same name by Columbia Pictures, directed by James Cruze, and starring Lee Tracy and Constance Cummings.

According to his one-time partner, Jack Anderson, Pearson saw journalism as a means to challenge those he thought to be working against the public interest. He himself had the reputation of a person who put principles over profit. Refusing to carry libel insurance or gain the support of his syndicate to finance libel judgments against him, Pearson's journalism resulted in more than 120 libel actions against him. However, he only had to pay a settlement in one legal case.

During World War II, Pearson's column not only revealed embarrassing news items, but expanded to criticize the Roosevelt administration's conduct of the war, in particular U.S. foreign policy regarding Joseph Stalin and the Soviet Union. As a supporter of the Soviet Union's struggle against Nazi Germany, Pearson demanded that the Allied Command create a second front in Europe in 1943 to assist the Soviets. When Pearson's demands were not met, he began to openly criticize Secretary of State Cordell Hull, James Dunn, and other State Department officials, whom Pearson accused of hating Soviet Russia. After one of Pearson's more virulent columns accused Secretary of State Hull and his deputies of a conscious policy to "bleed Russia white", President Roosevelt convened a press conference in which he angrily accused Pearson of printing statements that were a lie "from beginning to end", jeopardizing United Nations unity, and committing an act of bad faith towards his own nation. The president concluded his statement by calling Pearson "a chronic liar".

Pearson was the first to report the 1943 incident of General George S. Patton's slapping soldier Charles Kuhl. It was the first of two slapping-incidents, when General Patton, who denied the existence of combat stress reaction, struck and badly abused soldiers whom he had encountered during their evaluation at military field hospitals. Allied Headquarters denied that Patton had received either an official reprimand or removal from field command, but confirmed that Patton had slapped a soldier with his gloves. Demands for Patton to be recalled and sent home soon arose in Congress as well as in newspaper articles and editorials across the country. However, public opinion was largely favorable to Patton. While Patton was later reassigned and his career advancement slowed, he was not relieved, but continued to serve in the European theater, where he would later command the U.S. Third Army. Pearson's broadcast and subsequent article on Patton's alleged behavior sufficiently raised the suspicions of Secretary of War Henry L. Stimson that he requested Army General Joseph T. McNarney to "put an inspector on the War Department to see who has been leaking out information. Pearson's articles are about three-quarters false but there's just a germ of truth in them that someone must have given him."

After Pearson reported that General Douglas MacArthur was actively campaigning for his own promotion, MacArthur sued Pearson for defamation, but dropped the suit after Pearson threatened to publish love letters from MacArthur to his Eurasian paramour, Isabel Rosario Cooper.

== Post-war investigations ==
In February 1946, Pearson revealed the existence of a Canadian ring of Soviet spies who had given away secret information about the atomic bomb, and he hinted that the espionage scandal might extend to the U.S. as well. The U.S. government had kept the news secret for several months until Pearson broke the story in a series of radio broadcasts. It is possible that he was tipped off by a government official who wanted to turn U.S. public opinion against the Soviet Union, possibly even FBI director J. Edgar Hoover, according to historian Amy Knight.

Pearson also played a role in the downfall of New Jersey Congressman John Parnell Thomas, Chairman of the House Committee on Un-American Activities, in 1948. After revelations in Pearson's column, Thomas was investigated and later convicted of conspiracy to defraud the U.S. government for hiring friends who never worked for him, then depositing their paychecks into his personal accounts. Pearson was a staunch opponent of the actions of Senator Joseph McCarthy and other attempts by Congress to investigate Soviet and communist influence in government and the media, and he eagerly denounced the allegations by Senator McCarthy and the House Committee.

In May 1948, Pearson was among the journalists who reported on the business problems of Preston Tucker and his Tucker Corporation. A former policeman during the Prohibition era, Tucker was a self-made car-designer and businessman. Struggling to finance his high-flying plans in the design and safety of his cars, he had attempted "to raise money through unconventional means, including selling dealership rights for a car that didn't exist yet." When the U.S. Securities and Exchange Commission (SEC) and Justice Department started to investigate the case in 1947, his first annual report, which he initially had refused to produce, resulted in a deficit of $5,651,208. Tucker took the news of the latest investigation to the newspapers, publishing full-page ads that read: "My associates and myself and the Tucker Corp. have been investigated time & again . . . Now once more we are being investigated." Although he was acquitted of fraud charges, Tucker's firm went bankrupt in 1950.

=== James Forrestal ===
Journalists, such as Drew Pearson and Walter Winchell, were criticized for their continuing critical reports about the treatment of US Secretary of Defense James V. Forrestal. Forrestal, whom President Harry S. Truman had forced to resign, had committed suicide during his stay at the psychiatric clinic of the U. S. Naval Hospital, Bethesda, Maryland. The suicide was followed by an investigation, that was intended to clarify controversial aspects of his medical care. Forrestal, who had told his doctors about an earlier episode when he had tried to take his life, had been treated with Sodium amythal. After several weeks of this treatment, an insulin shock therapy followed. Both therapies resulted in strong overreactions: "From that time on he was carried with ten units of insulin before breakfast and another ten units before lunch with extra feedings in the afternoon and evening". His sleeplessness was treated with sedatives. In the course of the investigation, Forrestal's doctors had to explain why the chief of psychiatrists, who had been in charge of Forrestal, had been out of house at the time of his suicide, and why most of the patient's restrictions had been relieved. Other questions dealt with the fact that a patient with a high risk of suicide had been placed in a room on the sixteenth floor of the tower of the hospital. The chief of psychiatrists came up with a colleague's concern "that the widespread publicity might in some way reflect upon the excellence of Navy psychiatry unless there is full understanding by everyone of necessary risks and hazards which must be faced courageously in the management of such a medical problem." His diagnosis was that Forrestal had been outworked due to his difficult professional obligations, and that he had suffered from his loss of office. Asking for a second opportunity to elaborate further about what might have happened the night of the suicide, he only then hinted to a possible negative effect of some media reports on the mood of his patient. The investigation finally cleared the US Naval Hospital and its staff from suspicions and stated that its doctors and wards weren't responsible for Forrestal's death.

Pearson's protégé, Jack Anderson, later asserted that Pearson "hectored Forrestal with innuendos and false accusations". Pearson disliked Forrestal for his staunch anti-communist attitude, ties to Wall Street, and opposition to the U.S. recognition of Israel.

=== Speaking out against Senator McCarthy ===
In 1950, Pearson began the first of a series of columns attacking Senator Joseph McCarthy after McCarthy declared that he had a list of 205 people in the State Department who were members of the American Communist Party. Ironically, Pearson, through his associate Jack Anderson, had been using McCarthy as a confidential source for information on other politicians. Pearson used McCarthy's revelations in his columns with one exception – material on suspected Communists working in the U.S. government that McCarthy and his staff had uncovered. Over the next two months McCarthy made seven Senate speeches on Drew Pearson, calling for a "patriotic boycott" of his radio show which cost Pearson the sponsor of his program. Twelve newspapers also cancelled their contracts with Pearson.

In response, Senator McCarthy referred to Pearson's one-time assistant David Karr, born Katz, as "Pearson's 'KGB controller' and charged that 'Pearson's all-important job, which he did for the Party without fail, under the direction of David Karr, was to lead the character assassination of an man who was a threat to international communism." Karr had been exposed by the House Un-American Activities Committee in 1943 as having worked for two years on the staff of the Communist newspaper The Daily Worker. In response, Pearson claimed that Karr had only joined the Daily Worker because he had wanted to get into baseball games for free. Karr ostensibly covered home Yankee games for the Daily Worker, a paper not known for its sports readership, but his other activities remained unknown at the time. Years later, however, the release of the FBI's Venona decrypt of June 1944 revealed that Karr was an informational source for the NKVD. Another member of Pearson's staff, Andrew Older, along with his wife, was identified in 1951 as a Communist Party member in testimony before the Senate Internal Security Subcommittee. Older's sister, Julia Older, was also suspected of having spied for the Soviet Union.

In December 1950, McCarthy and Pearson were involved in a physical altercation at the Sulgrave Club in Washington, D.C. Pearson later sued McCarthy for injuries he allegedly suffered in the altercation, which Pearson stated resulted from being "grabbed by the neck and kicked in the groin." The following month, McCarthy delivered a speech in the Senate in which he referred to Pearson as a "communist tool".

In October 1953, Senator McCarthy began investigating communist infiltration into the military. McCarthy's attempts to discredit Robert Stevens, the Secretary of the Army, infuriated President Dwight Eisenhower, who instructed the Department of the Army to release information detrimental to McCarthy to journalists who were known to be opposed to him. On December 15, 1952, Pearson, working with Eisenhower's staff, published a column using the information on McCarthy, dealing him a significant blow.

== Engagement for democracy and peace ==
Drew Pearson's engagement for democracy and peace started at an early age and lasted throughout his entire life. The best-known of his manyfold activities were:

- 1919-1921: Volunteer for two years of service in Serbia to supervise the American Friends Service Committee (forerunner of the Peace Corps) postwar relief program in Balkan villages
- Long-time president of the Washington D. C. chapter of Big Brothers, at the time a non-profit program with the concept of a One-Man-One-Boy relationship allowing to graduate potential delinquent boys into responsible citizenship
- Taking troupes of professional entertainers (e.g. the Harlem Globetrotters) for visits to American overseas bases at Christmas time
- 1952 Organization of the committee "Americans Against Bombs of Bigotry", to take action against the bombing of schools and worship that had resulted from racial and religious intolerance
- 1953 Organization of the "Americans Conscience Fund" for victims of racial bigotry
- Largely responsible for raising the money to rebuild the Clinton, Tennessee, schoolhouse, that two years after the 1956 desegregation had been destroyed by white supremacists

Following World War II, Drew Pearson with the support of his wife Luvie Pearson initiated the Friendship Train which on its way through the USA collected over 250 cars of foodstuffs, over $40 million in aid for "America's friends" in war-torn Europe: "Luvie was the steam that powered the train across the northern United States, and Drew fired up the southern route. Both stopped at every village for contributions. They collected enough food to fill 'two long freight trains.' And then they took it to Europe, with keys to the towns presented at every stop." The train was an incredible example of the power of people, and the willingness to help those in need and put differences aside. The entire process was without cost and without government involvement. On December 19, 1947, one day after the arrival of the much-needed food, medicine and supplies in France, Pearson was awarded the French Legion of Honor, rank of Chevalier, in recognition of his charitable engagement and work.

Some of his other international engagements for democracy and peace were:

- Organisation of the "Democracy Letters to Italy" in the election of 1948, to help defeat Communism in Italy in this election
- 1951 he helped to launch the "Freedom Balloon" campaign, by which the Crusade for Freedom reached behind the Iron Curtain with messages of liberty and encouragement
- 1953: Initiator of the "Food for East Germany" program (supported by the Eisenhower Administration)
- 1954: Attended the inauguration of the Cochabamba–Santa Cruz highway connecting western and eastern Bolivia.
- 1959: Delegate to the Atlantic Conference (London)
- 1961: Member of the "President's Food for Peace Committee"
- 1961: Interviews with Chairman Khrushchev at his summer home on the Black Sea

== Death and legacy ==
On August 3, 1969, Pearson was hospitalized in Washington for a viral infection that led to heart complications. He was released to his home in Potomac, Maryland, on August 29, but suffered a heart attack on September 1, and died at the emergency room of George Washington University Hospital at the age of 71.

At the time of his death, the column was syndicated to more than 650 newspapers, more than twice as many as any other, with an estimated 60 million readers, and was famous for its investigative style of journalism. A Harris Poll commissioned by Time magazine at that time showed that Pearson was America's best-known newspaper columnist at the time of his death. The column was continued by Jack Anderson and then by Douglas Cohn and Eleanor Clift, who combine commentary with historical perspectives. It is the longest-running syndicated column in America.

American University Library received the typescript copies of the columns distributed to newspapers around the country in 1992. Shortly thereafter, the Library embarked on a project to digitize the collection.

== Personal life ==
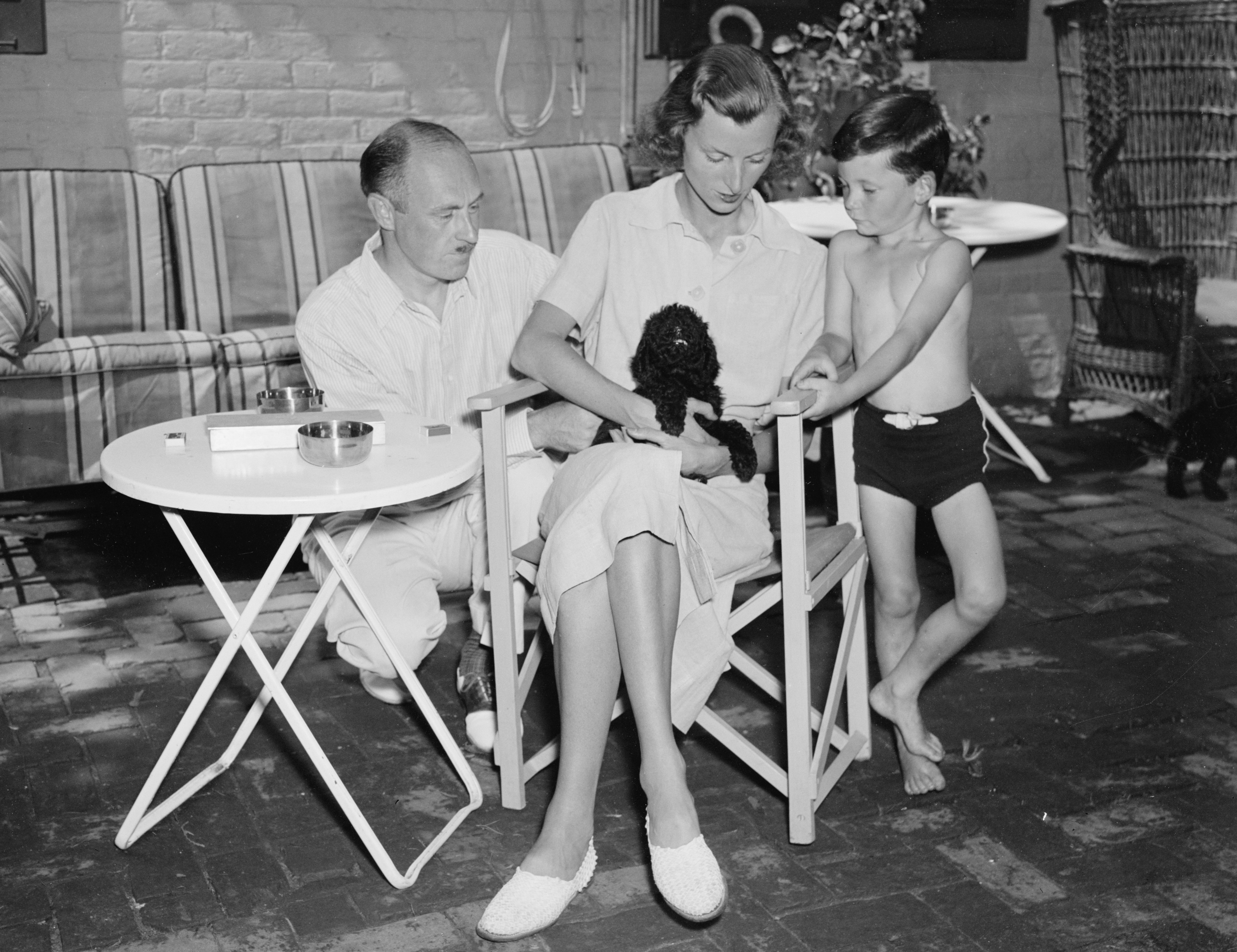
Drew and Luvie Pearson with Tyler Abell, 1937

Drew Pearson had one daughter, Ellen Cameron Pearson (1926–2010), in a short marriage (1925–28) to Felicia Gizycka, daughter of the newspaper heiress Cissy Patterson and Count Joseph Gizycky of Poland. Thereafter, Pearson maintained a strained relationship with his former mother-in-law, and they frequently exchanged barbed comments in print. His second wife was Luvie Moore Abell (a cousin of Edith Kermit Carow), whom he married in 1936; through that union he had a step son, Tyler Abell, to whom he was close throughout his life. Abell later became chief of protocol under President Lyndon B. Johnson.

== Published works ==
- Washington Merry-Go-Round, with Robert S. Allen (New York: Horace Liveright, 1931)
- More Merry-Go-Round, with Robert S. Allen (New York: Horace Liveright, 1932)
- The American Diplomatic Game, with Constantine Brown (New York: Doubleday, Doran & Co., 1935)
- The Nine Old Men, with Robert S. Allen (New York: Doubleday, Doran & Co., 1937)
- U.S.A.: Second Class Power?, with Jack Anderson (New York: Simon & Schuster, 1958)
- The Case Against Congress: a Compelling Indictment of Corruption on Capitol Hill, with Jack Anderson (New York: Simon & Schuster, 1968)
- The Senator (New York: Doubleday, 1968)
- The President (New York: Doubleday, 1970)
- Diaries, 1949–1959 (New York: Holt, Rinehart & Winston, 1974)
- Nine Old Men (American Constitutional and Legal History), with Robert S. Allen (New York: Da Capo Press, 1974) ISBN 0-306-70609-1
- Washington Merry-Go-Round: The Drew Pearson Diaries, 1960-1969, by Drew Pearson (Author), Peter Hannaford (Editor), Richard Norton Smith (Foreword), September 15, 2015 ISBN 978-1612346939, University of Nebraska Press.

== Awards and recognition ==
Pearson was awarded Norway's Medal of St. Olav, the French Legion of Honour, the Order of the Star of Italian Solidarity, and two honorary degrees. He also was given a star on the Hollywood Walk of Fame for "The Drew Pearson Show", an early program of current events.

Character actor Robert F. Simon played Pearson in the 1977 NBC television movie Tail Gunner Joe, a biopic of U.S. Senator Joseph R. McCarthy of Wisconsin.

== See also ==
- Profiles in Courage, section: Authorship
- Edward R. Murrow
