= Helen Dewar =

American newspaper reporter and journalist (1936–2006)

- Born: August 7, 1936; Stockton, California, US
- Died: November 4, 2006 (aged 70); Alexandria, Virginia, US
- Resting place: Stockton Rural Cemetery, Stockton, California
- Education: Stanford University
- Occupations: Journalist, Editor
- Employer: The Washington Post
- Known for: First female winner of the Everett McKinley Dirksen Award for Distinguished Reporting of Congress

Helen Dewar (August 7, 1936 – November 4, 2006) was an American journalist and reporter for more than 40-years. She worked for The Washington Post, rising through the ranks to cover the United States Senate for a quarter of a century (1979–2004). Dewar worked for the Northern Virginia Sun from 1958–1961 covering education.

Dewar was the First female winner of the Everett McKinley Dirksen Award for Distinguished Reporting of Congress. David Broder, political pundit and longtime political columnist at the Post, called Dewar "one of the best reporters I ever knew." The last story written by her to be published in the Post on January 20, 2005, predicted that President George W. Bush would have difficulties having his legislative agenda enacted by Congress.

== Background and education ==
Helen Dewer, was born in Stockton, California, on August 7, 1936, to Herbert Duncan and Gertrude (Howland) Dewar. Her father, born in Belgium, was an attorney and a walnut farmer. Dewar graduated from the Katherine Branson School and then attended Stanford University, graduating in 1957 with a degree in political science. She worked as a reporter and editor, at the college newspaper, the Stanford Daily. After graduation, she spent time as a public affairs intern, at the CORO Foundation, in San Francisco.

== Career ==
Dewer went to work at The Washington Post in 1958, on the advice of her mentors at the CORO Foundation. She left after a week, unhappy with the duties she was assigned to, as part of the Women's Section. She joined the staff at the Northern Virginia Sun in Arlington, Virginia, where she covered education for two years.

In 1961, Dewar returned to The Washington Post, where she covered Arlington, and Fairfax, as well as working on general assignments. In 1965 she covered state government in Virginia and by 1975, after covering Capitol Hill for a year, she was assigned to cover Jimmy Carter's presidential campaign.

After her work at the national desk, Dewar spent two years (1977–1979) reporting on labor issues before being assigned to cover the United States Senate. In 1984, she received the Everett McKinley Dirksen Award for Distinguished Reporting by the National Press Foundation, for Distinguished Reporting of Congress; she was the first woman to receive the award.

Dewar was known for her determination to remain near the senate chamber doorway, even after Congressional leaders attempted to restrict reporters access in the 1990s. She was credited with perfecting the "Dewar walk," a reference to her wandering near the area, and in the corridors, positioning herself to be the first to question senators as they left the chamber after a vote.

She continued reporting on the senate through the rest of her career with the Post, where she earned the reputation, in the words of then Senate Majority Leader Bill Frist, as being '"a legend in Washington and a reporter in the best traditions of the profession.'" He described Dewar as having '"an eye for detail and a keen sense if the truth."' Massachusetts senator Edward M. Kennedy credited her as being '"a journalist of the highest caliber.'"

The last story written by her to be published in the Post, on January 20, 2005, predicted that President George W. Bush would have difficulties having his legislative agenda enacted by Congress.

== Death ==
Dewar died from breast cancer on November 4, 2006, aged 70, at a hospice in Alexandria, Virginia. She left no immediate survivors. Her ashes were buried at the Dewar family plot, alongside her parents, at Stockton Rural Cemetery, in Stockton, California.

== Awards and recognition ==
- 1984 Winner, Everett McKinley Dirksen Award for Distinguished Reporting, by the National Press Foundation, for Distinguished Reporting of Congress
- 1987 Winner, Eugene Meyer Award, by The Washington Post, in recognition of her distinguished career and contribution to the newspaper
- 2006 Inducted into the Virginia Communications Hall of Fame
- 2006 Winner, the Lifetime Achievement Award, by the Washington Press Club Foundation, in recognition of her outstanding accomplishments in promoting the profession and enhancing the role of women in journalism
- In 2018 the Virginia Capitol Foundation announced that Dewar's name would be on the Virginia Women's Monument's glass Wall of Honor.
