= John Mockler (politician) =

John B. Mockler

California Secretary of Education
- In office 2000–2002
- Governor: Gray Davis

Executive Director, California State Board of Education
- In office 1999–2000
- Governor: Gray Davis

Director, Office of Government Regulations, California Department of Education
- In office 1974–1977

Personal details
- Born: John Barry Mockler; October 2, 1941 Chicago, Illinois, United States.
- Died: March 3, 2015 (aged 73) Sacramento, California, U.S.

John Barry Mockler (October 2, 1941 – March 3, 2015) was Secretary of Education in California and former Executive Director of the California State Board of Education. Mockler was the chief architect of California Proposition 98 (1988).

== Life and political career ==
Mockler was born in Chicago, Illinois. After his father returned from active duty in World War II, his family moved to Harbison Canyon, California, a small town outside San Diego. He graduated from El Cajon high school in 1958 and in 1963 graduated from the University of California, Santa Barbara with a bachelor's degree in economics. He also attended the University of San Francisco and San Francisco State University. He became active in union politics, and worked on the mayoral campaign of San Francisco mayor Jack Shelley. He was also a graduate of the Coro Foundation Fellows Program in Public Affairs.

Mockler was the executive director of the Youth Against 14 campaign in 1964. Proposition 14 would have made it legal to discriminate against home buyers on the basis of race. Mockler set up a fund-raiser for the campaign, the largest folk concert produced in America (at the time) at the Hollywood Bowl in September 23, 1964.

In 1965, Mockler began the Sacramento, California, phase of his political career. He joined the staff of Senator Fred Farr as a legislative assistant and went on to become a Consultant to the California State Legislature, including the Assembly Education and Ways and Means committees. From 1983-85, he served as Deputy Chief of Staff to Speaker of the California State Assembly Willie Brown. Mockler founded and served three years as Director of the Independent Analysis Unit of the Los Angeles City Board of Education. From 1974-77 served as Senior Executive Staff to the Superintendent of Public Instruction Wilson Riles.

Mockler was a recognized expert in education issues in California. He was the founder of Mockler and Associates, an educational consulting firm based in Sacramento.

On April 27, 2015, section 41200 of the California education code, the part of California Proposition 98 that became law, was renamed The John B. Mockler School Finance Act.

== Death ==
Mockler died on March 3, 2015, in Sacramento from pancreatic cancer, aged 73.
