= James Jessen Badal =

American true crime writer

James Jessen Badal (born 1943) is an American true crime writer.

He is also an assistant professor in English language and journalism at Cuyahoga Community College. His true crime works include a book about the disappearance of Beverly Potts and three books about the Cleveland Torso Murders case. According to his first book about the latter, In the Wake of the Butcher, he took an interest in the case while still in elementary school, when his teacher of history in the 8th grade gave his class a two-day lecture about the murders. As of 2014, he is working on a book about the unsolved murder of 16-year-old Beverly Jarosz, committed in Garfield Heights, Ohio, in 1964.

Badal resides in Cleveland, Ohio.

== Bibliography ==
- Recording the Classics: Maestros, Music, and Technology (1996)
- In the Wake of the Butcher: Cleveland's Torso Murders (2001)
- Twilight of Innocence: The Disappearance of Beverly Potts (2005)
- Though Murder Has No Tongue: The Lost Victim of Cleveland’s Mad Butcher (2010)
- Hell’s Wasteland: The Pennsylvania Torso Murders (2013)
