= W. E. Butts =

American poet

Walter E. Butts
- Born: September 12, 1944
- Died: March 1, 2013 (aged 68); Manchester, New Hampshire, U.S.
- Education: Vermont College of Fine Arts
- Occupation: Poet
- Writing career
- Genre: Poetry

Walter E. Butts (September 12, 1944 – March 31, 2013) was an American poet and the Poet Laureate of New Hampshire. His book Sunday Evening at the Stardust Café was a finalist for the 2005 Philip Levine Prize in Poetry from the California State University, Fresno, and won the Iowa Source Poetry Book Prize. He has also received a Pushcart Prize nomination.

His work has been published in such literary journals as the Atlanta Review, Poetry East, Cimarron Review, Mid-American Review, Slant, PoetryMotel, Poet Lore and Spillway and has been anthologized in Emerson of Harvard (2003), Tokens: Contemporary Poetry of the Subway (P&Q Press, New York), and The Anthology of Magazine Verse & Yearbook of American Poetry (1997). He has also written reviews of other poets' works, including Tell Them We Were Here by David Kelly, a Rochester, New York–area poet.

Until the late 1970s, Butts lived in LeRoy, New York, near Rochester, where he was one of several poets who organized featured readings and open mics in the area, most notably at the Cobbs Hill Grill, a popular local bar and restaurant. Over the next few years he lived in Albany, New York, New York City, Boston, and Portsmouth, New Hampshire, and most recently in Manchester, New Hampshire. In April 2003, he was among the participants in the first gathering of state poets laureate organized by New Hampshire’s poet laureate, Marie Harris. That same year, he also toured northern New Hampshire with South Dakota poet David Allan Evans, giving readings and discussions at community centers and bookstores. Some of these were broadcast on regional National Public Radio and Public Broadcasting stations.

Butts received his M.F.A. from the Vermont College of Fine Arts in 1995, and he taught creative writing workshops at the University of New Hampshire at Manchester. Most recently, he was an associate professor of English at the Hesser College campus in Manchester and at the low residency Bachelor of Fine Arts program at Goddard College. He was cited in the 2002 edition of Who’s Who Among America’s Teachers.

In addition to teaching, Butts also co-edited Walking to Windward: Poets of New England, Volume 3 (Oyster River Press, 2001) and was the co-editor and publisher (with his wife S Stephanie) of the literary magazine Crying Sky: Poetry & Conversation.

== Published works ==
Full-length poetry collections

- Cathedral of Nervous Horses: New and Selected Poems (Hobblebush Books, 2012)
- Sunday Evening at the Stardust Café (1st World Library, 2006)
- Movies in a Small Town (Mellen Poetry Press, 1997)

Chapbooks

- Story & Luck (Adastra Press, 2015)
- What to Say If the Birds Ask (Pudding House Publications, 2007)
- Sunday Factory (Finishing Line Press, 2006)
- White Bees (Oyster River Press, 2001)
- A Season of Crows (Igneus Press, 2000)
- The Required Dance (Igneus Press, 1990)
- The Inheritance (Four Zoas Press, 1983)
