= Oyster River Press =

Press based in Durham, New Hampshire, United States

Oyster River Press is a small press based in Durham, New Hampshire. The press specializes in new and international poetry, as well as books on Chinese myths, the environment, and the art of living. Bilingual editions of translations are also a focus. Authors published by the press since its inception in 1987 include Xiao-Ming Li, Joan Raysor Darlington, Cicely Buckley, Paul Eluard, David Oates, Robert Duffy, Patricia Fargnoli, W. E. Butts, Fred Samuels, John Perrault, Hugh Hennedy, Rick Agran, Almor Halperin, Eva Claeson, Keith Holyoak, Robert Dunn, Elizabeth Knies, Elena Lafert and Melina Draper, among others.

The editor and founder of Oyster River Press is Cicely Buckley.

Oyster River Press has played an important role in publishing the work of New Hampshire poets. A collection of chapbooks distributed as a set entitled Walking to Windward received critical praise in the Comstock Review.
