= Cleveland Torso Murderer =

1930s unidentified American serial killer

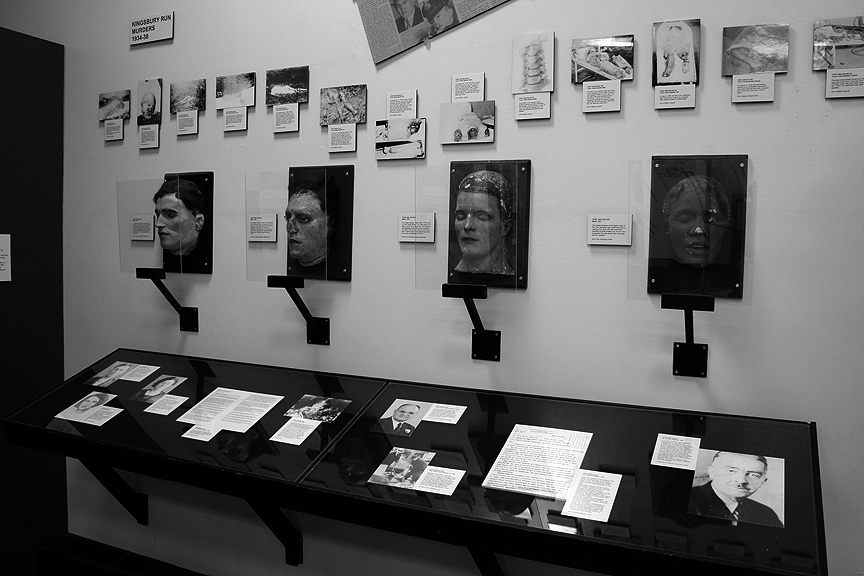
- An exhibition dedicated to the Cleveland Torso Murderer at the Cleveland Police Museum (from left to right: Death masks of the victims Edward Andrassy, Florence Genevieve Polillo, "The Tattooed Man" and Jane Doe II).
- Other name: The Mad Butcher of Kingsbury Run

Details
- Victims: 13–20+
- Span of crimes: September 5, 1934 – August 16, 1938
- Country: United States
- States: Ohio, possibly Pennsylvania and California
- Date apprehended: Never apprehended

The Cleveland Torso Murderer, also known as the Mad Butcher of Kingsbury Run, was an unidentified serial killer who operated in Cleveland, Ohio, United States, during the 1930s. The killings were characterized by the dismemberment of thirteen known victims and the disposal of their remains in the impoverished neighborhood of Kingsbury Run. Most victims came from an area east of Kingsbury Run called "The Roaring Third" or "Hobo Jungle", known for its bars, gambling dens, brothels and vagrants.

Despite an investigation of the murders, which at one time was led by famed lawman Eliot Ness, the murderer was never apprehended. In 2024, the Cuyahoga County Medical Examiner's Office teamed up with the DNA Doe Project to exhume some of the unidentified victims and use investigative genetic genealogy to determine their identities.

== Murders ==
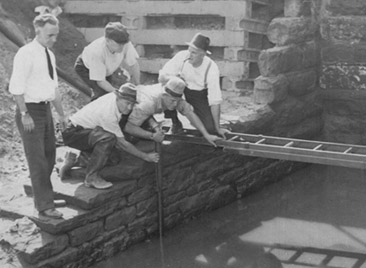
Cleveland police searching for human remains, September 1936.

The official number of murders attributed to the Cleveland Torso Murderer is twelve, although recent research has shown there could have been as many as twenty or more. The twelve known victims were killed between 1935 and 1938. Some investigators, including lead detective Peter Merylo, believed that there may have been thirteen or more victims in the Cleveland, Youngstown and Pittsburgh areas between the 1920s and 1950s. Two strong candidates for addition to the "official" list are the unknown victim nicknamed the "Lady of the Lake", found on September 5, 1934; and Robert Robertson, found on July 22, 1950.

Victims of the Torso Murderer were usually drifters whose identities were never determined, although there were a few exceptions. Victims numbers 2, 3 and 8 were identified as Edward Andrassy, Florence Polillo and possibly Rose Wallace, respectively. Andrassy and Polillo were both identified by their fingerprints, while Wallace was tentatively identified via her dental records. The victims appeared to be lower class individuals – easy prey during the Great Depression. Many were known as "working poor" who had nowhere else to live but the ramshackle shanty towns, or "Hoovervilles", in the area known as the Cleveland Flats.

The Torso Murderer always decapitated and often dismembered his victims, occasionally severing the victim's torso in half or severing his or her appendages. In many cases the cause of death was the decapitation or dismemberment itself. Most of the male victims were castrated. Some victims showed evidence of chemical treatment being applied to their bodies, which caused the skin to become red, tough and leathery. Many were found after a considerable period of time following their deaths, occasionally in excess of a year. In an era when forensic science was largely in its infancy, these factors further complicated identification, especially since the heads were often undiscovered.

During the time of the "official" murders, Eliot Ness, leader of the Untouchables, was serving as Cleveland's Public Safety Director, a position with authority over the city's police and ancillary services, including the fire department. Ness contributed to the arrest and interrogation of one of the prime suspects, Dr. Francis Sweeney, and personally conducted raids into shantytowns and eventually burned them down. Ness' reasoning for doing so was to catalogue fingerprints to easily identify any new victims, and to get possible victims out of the area in an attempt to stop the murders.

Four days after the burning, on August 22, 1938, Ness launched another operation where he personally dispatched six two-man search teams on a large area of Cleveland, stretching from the Cuyahoga River to East 55th Street to Prospect Avenue, under the guise of conducting fire inspections. While the search never turned up any new or incriminating information that could lead to the arrest and conviction of the Torso Murderer, it did serve to focus renewed public attention on the inadequate and unsanitary living conditions in the downtown area. Teams uncovered hundreds of families living in hazardous fire traps without toilets or running water. The interests of the lower class did ultimately come to light even if those of law enforcement did not.

At one point, the Torso Murderer taunted Ness by placing the remains of two victims in full view of his office at Cleveland City Hall. The man who Ness believed to be the killer would later also provoke him by sending postcards.

== Victims ==
Most researchers consider there to be twelve victims attributed to the Torso Murderer, although some have counted as many as twenty or forty. Evidence suggests a woman dubbed the "Lady of the Lake" could be included. Another possible victim from 1950, Robert Robertson, was found with his head cut off in a manner similar to the confirmed victims. Only three victims were positively identified; the other ten were six John Does and four Jane Does. Exhumations of unidentified victims started in August 2024 after the Cuyahoga County Medical Examiner's Office partnered with the DNA Doe Project to identify the victims through genetic genealogy.

=== Edward Andrassy ===
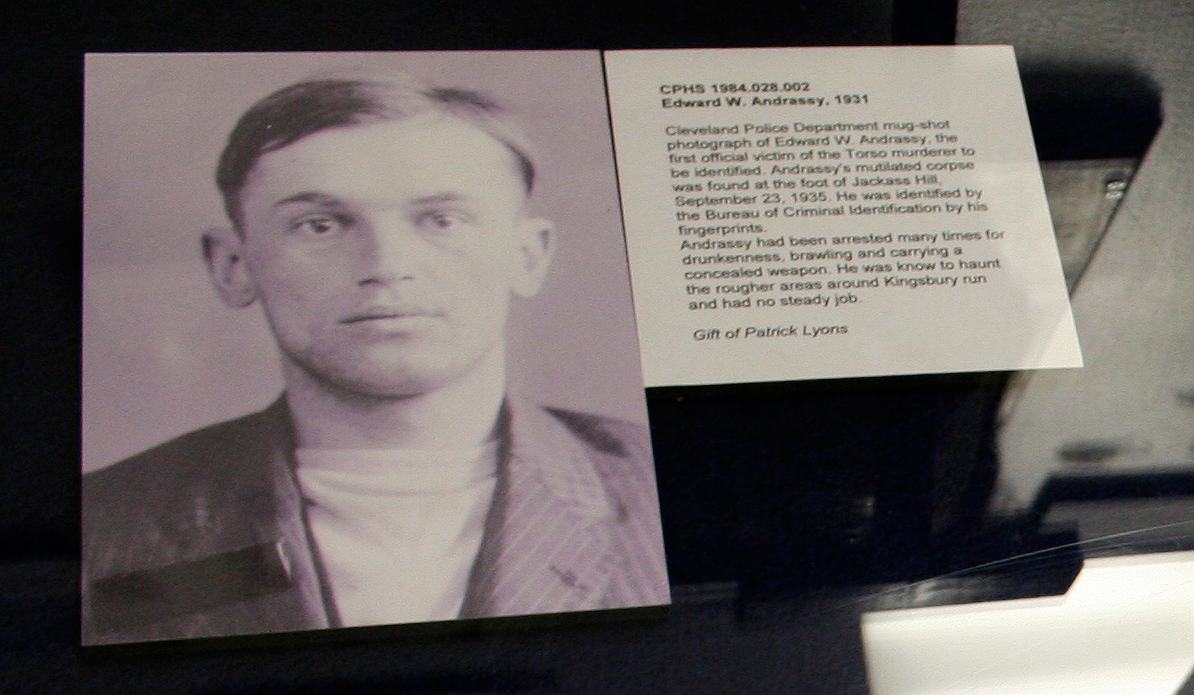
Edward Andrassy

Edward Anthony Andrassy (29) was discovered on September 23, 1935, in a gully at the base of Jackass Hill, where East 49th Street runs into a dead-end at Kingsbury Run. Andrassy's head was discovered buried near the rest of his body, which was found to be emasculated and wearing only socks. The autopsy report stated that Andrassy was decapitated in the mid-cervical region, with a fracture of the mid-cervical vertebrae. The coroner also noted that Andrassy had rope burns around his wrists. The cause of death was decapitation; hemorrhage and shock. He had been dead for two to three days.

At one time, Andrassy had been an orderly in the psychiatric ward at Cleveland City Hospital. However, at the time of his death, he was unemployed and had no visible means of financial support.

=== John Doe I ===
The decapitated remains of another white male were also located in weeds at the foot of East 49th Street and Praha Avenue next to Andrassy. Evidence suggested that the unidentified victim's body was saturated with oil and set afire after death, causing the skin to become reddish and leathery. It also appeared as though the victim's body hair had either been shaved or burned off. The unidentified male became known as John Doe I.

=== Florence Polillo ===
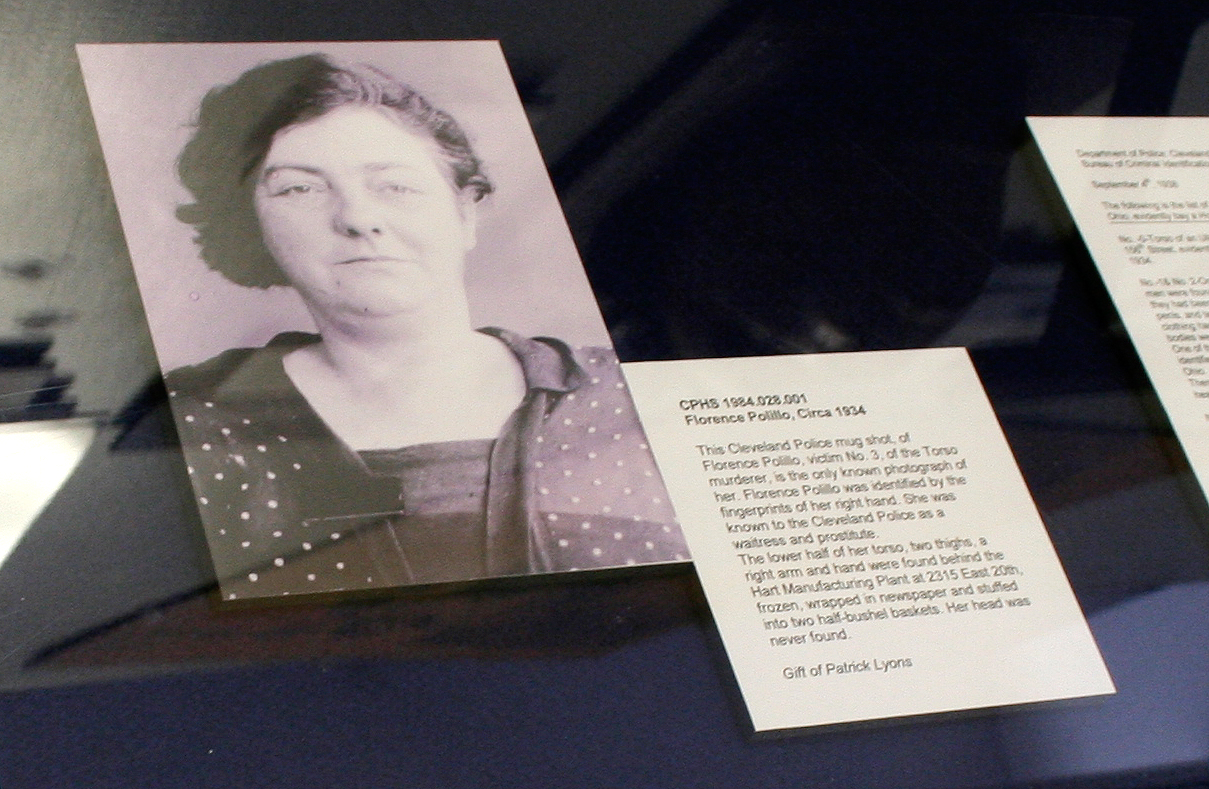
Florence Polillo

Florence Genevieve Polillo (44) was discovered at 2315 to 2325 East 20th Street on January 26, 1936. Polillo was found dismembered and had been wrapped with paper and packed into half-bushel baskets, but her head was never discovered. The autopsy report stated that her cause of death was a slit throat. Due to the lack of the head, the coroner could not definitively rule her death a homicide.

=== John Doe II (The Tattooed Man) ===
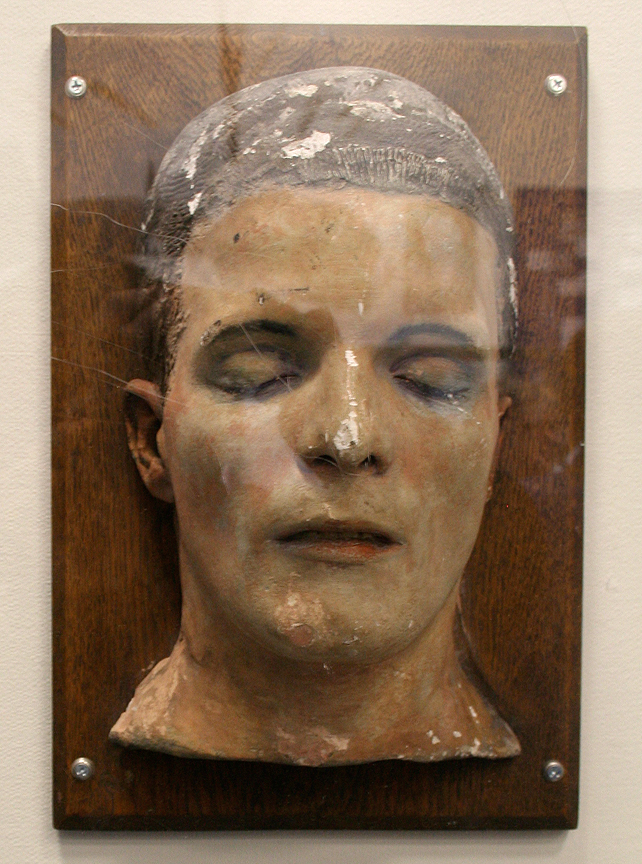
The Tattooed Man

The decapitated torso of an unidentified man was located on June 5, 1936, between the New York Central and Nickel Plate Road tracks next to an old freight shed, in front of the Nickel Plate Road police building. His head was found near the Shaker Heights Rapid Transit tracks.

The victim's body was nude but unmutilated and found only about fifteen hundred feet away from the head. There was no blood on the ground, indicating he had been killed elsewhere. A railroad worker testified that the head was not in the vicinity at 3:00 p.m. that day, and an eyewitness described seeing a late-model Cadillac close to the crime scene at about 11:00 p.m. that same night.

The physical evidence of the decapitation suggested it had been done while the victim was alive, and the autopsy report stated that the body was drained of blood. The head had been cut off between the first and second cervical vertebrae. There was no evidence of drugs or alcohol in the victim's body, and nothing to suggest that he had been tortured or bound before being killed.

John Doe II had six tattoos, hence the nickname "The Tattooed Man". (Note: The victim, found at Morgan Run, near E 55th Street, Cleveland, was estimated to be 20 to 23 years old, light complexion, reddish brown hair, chestnut colored eyes, stood 5 foot 10 or 11 inches (178–180 cm) tall, slender build, weighed 165 lb (75 kg). He had six unusual tattoos on his body: a bird and band and the names "Helen and Paul" on the inner side of his left forearm, a heart and anchor in red and blue on the outer side of his right forearm, a flag and the initials "W.C.G." on the inner side of his right forearm, a butterfly on his left shoulder, the head of the comic book character "Jiggs" on his left ankle and an image of Cupid on his right ankle. His undershorts bore a laundry mark indicating the owner's initials were J.D. Despite morgue and death mask inspections by thousands of Cleveland citizens in the summer of 1936 at the Great Lakes Exposition, the victim was never identified. (His tattoos suggested that he may have been either in the U.S. Coast Guard, U.S. Navy or the Merchant Marine service.))

=== John Doe III ===
On July 22, 1936, the severely decomposed, decapitated remains of a white male were located near a homeless camp in the Big Creek area of Brooklyn, west of Cleveland. This was the only known West Side victim of the Torso Murderer. Police conducted a thorough search of the area and found the man's head, which was a skull at that point. Cheaply made, bloodstained clothing was found nearby. A pathologist discovered a large quantity of dried blood that had seeped into the ground beneath the man's body, indicating he was killed at that location.

For the first time the murderer had ventured far away from Kingsbury Run, and instead of transporting the victim had killed him in the place he was discovered. The victim's long hair, poor clothing and location near the homeless camp suggested he was one of the many vagrants who rode in and out of Cleveland on the nearby railroad tracks. However, the advanced state of decay of the body made it impossible to get any fingerprints, and the head would have been decomposed and unrecognizable by that point. Searches through missing persons reports were unsuccessful. The unidentified male became known as John Doe III. (Note: The victim was believed to be a 40-year-old man. Clothing was muddied and piled up next to the head, ten feet from the nude body, in an isolated East Side woodland section. There were bloodstains on the coat and blue polo shirt, part of the clothing found with the head. Coroner A. J. Pearse said that the preliminary investigation disclosed that there was some doubt that the man was murdered. Not a single clue was found with the body other than the clothing.)

=== John Doe IV ===
A homeless person discovered two halves of a male torso and lower legs floating in a stagnant pool near East 37th Street while waiting for an eastbound freight train. The torso was removed and sent to the morgue, where the coroner noted the body had been severed between the third and fourth cervical vertebrae as well as between the third and fourth lumbar vertebrae. A search was made for the rest of the body. Police found a dirty felt hat labelled "Laudy's Smart Shop, Bellevue, Ohio", which appeared to have blood spots on the top. A blue work shirt, covered with blood, was found wrapped in newspaper along the bank of the creek where the body was found. A fire crew dredged the water in the creek in an attempt to locate more parts of the body. The head was never found, nor the body identified. The victim's kidneys and stomach were removed, as were his genitals. The coroner declared the probable cause of death as decapitation. The unidentified male became known as John Doe IV.

=== Jane Doe I ===
On February 23, 1937, the upper portion of an unidentified female victim was found washed up on Euclid Beach on 156th Street. The legs, arms and head were never found, likely because they were less buoyant than the torso and possibly sank to the bottom of Lake Erie. Three months later the lower half of the torso washed ashore at East 30th Street. The upper extremities were disarticulated at the level of the glenoid fossa, better known as the socket of the shoulder joint. The neck and head were also disarticulated between the seventh cervical and first thoracic vertebrae. Multiple hesitation knife marks at the surface of the skin were present. Considerable water and gravel were found in both pleural cavities. The probable cause of death was officially undetermined via the coroner's case file. The unidentified female became known as Jane Doe I.

=== Jane Doe II ===
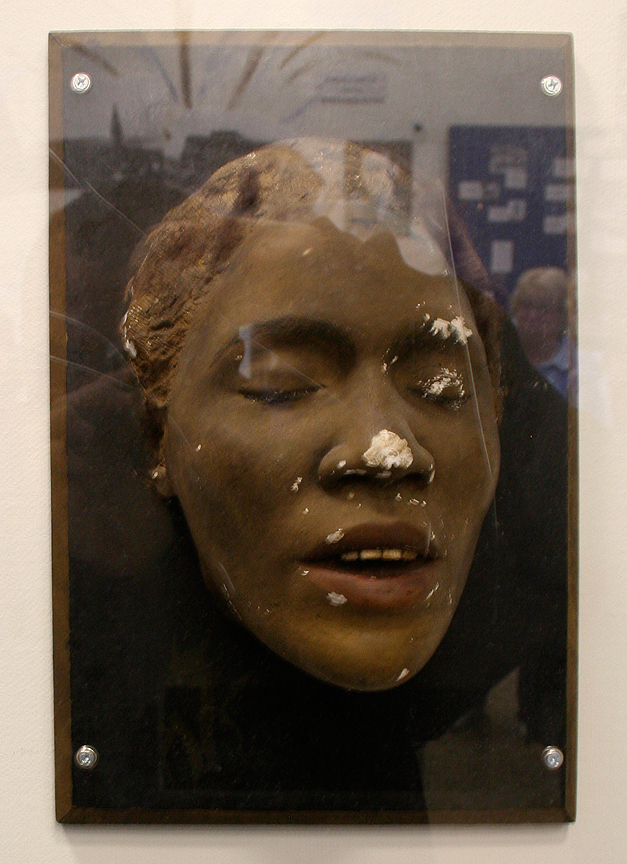
Jane Doe II

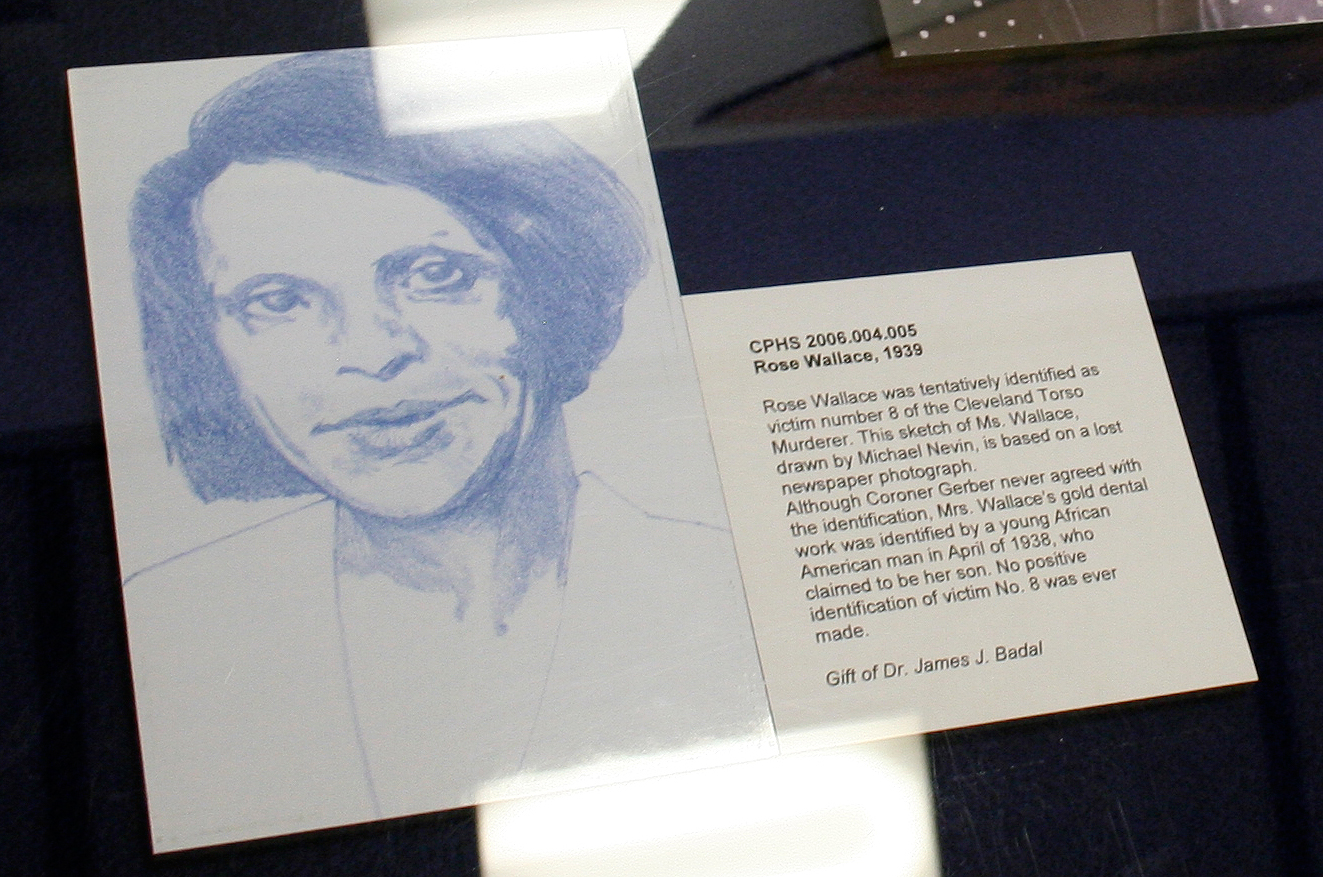
Rose Wallace

The eighth victim was located beneath the Lorain-Carnegie Bridge on June 6, 1937. Lying in a rotting burlap bag, along with a newspaper from June 1936, was the partial skeleton of a woman who had been dead approximately one year. The body was decapitated and missing a rib. She was tentatively identified as prostitute Rose Wallace (40), who had vanished from the same bar Polillo had, but this could not be confirmed. Wallace was known to have disappeared ten months earlier on August 21, 1936, while it was estimated that the victim had been dead for one year when found. Officially the victim remains unidentified and is known as Jane Doe II. (Note: Dental work was considered a close match by police and her son, who said he was certain that the victim was his mother. Exact identification could not be achieved because the dentist who carried out the work had died years before. Doubts remained because the body was estimated to have been dead for a year, whereas Wallace had only been reported missing for ten months since August 1936.)

=== John Doe V ===
On July 6, 1937, the upper portion of a man's torso wrapped in a burlap sack for chicken feed, plus his two thighs, were discovered floating in the Cuyahoga River in the Cleveland Flats just below Kingsbury Run. The head, as well as the internal organs within the abdominal cavity and the heart, were never found. The unidentified male became known as John Doe V.

=== Jane Doe III ===
On April 8, 1938, a woman's leg was located in the Cuyahoga River in the Cleveland Flats. A month later on May 2, two burlap bags containing a woman's nude bisected torso, thighs and feet were discovered floating in the river to the east of the West 3rd Street Bridge. Her head and arms were never found. She was the only victim to have morphine in her system, estimated at 0.002 gm. per 100 gm. sample. The unidentified female became known as Jane Doe III.

=== Jane Doe IV and John Doe VI ===
On August 16, 1938, a dismembered body was found at a dump at the end of East Ninth Street by men combing for pieces of scrap metal. The body of a woman was wrapped in rags, brown paper and cardboard. Uncharacteristically, the head and hands were found with the rest of the body. The victim's head had been disarticulated at the level of the third intervertebral disc. The unidentified female became known as Jane Doe IV.

On the same day, the body of John Doe VI was discovered at a nearby location on the Cleveland lakefront, in plain view of Ness' office at City Hall. Similar to the other victims, the head was severed from the body and the victim remains unidentified. The head was disarticulated at the level of the third inter-vertebral disc and had knife marks on the dorsum of the second and third cervical vertebrae. Extremities at all the major joints were all disarticulated as well. The coroner ruled the cause of death as undetermined though he noted it was probably a homicide.

== Possible victims ==
=== Lady of the Lake ===
The lower half of a woman's torso, thighs still attached but amputated at the knees, washed up on the shores of Lake Erie just east of Bratenahl on September 5, 1934. A subsequent search yielded only a few other body parts. The head was never found. She was nicknamed the "Lady of the Lake". This victim had an abdominal scar from a likely hysterectomy, which was common and made it more difficult to identify her. After she was found, several people reported seeing other body parts in the water, including a group of fishermen who believed to have seen a head.

The Lady of the Lake was found virtually in the same spot as Jane Doe I. Both victims had on their skin a chemical which was believed to have been lime chloride. It is supposed that the killer meant to use a quickening lime to decompose the bodies faster but mistakenly used lime that would preserve the bodies instead.

=== Robert Robertson ===
On July 22, 1950, Robert Robertson (41) was discovered at 2138 Davenport Avenue. Police believed he had been dead six to eight weeks and appeared to have been intentionally decapitated, fitting the profile of other victims. Robertson was estranged from his family, had an arrest record and was an alcoholic on the fringes of society. Despite widespread newspaper coverage linking his death to the Torso Murderer, detectives treated it as an isolated crime.

== Other possible related murders ==
Between 1921 and 1942, nine people, eight of them unidentified, were found dead and dismembered in swamps or around train yards near Pittsburgh, Pennsylvania. Due to similarities in method and injuries, the so-called "Murder Swamp Killings" have been theorized to be additional victims of the Torso Murderer. These similarities, along with Pittsburgh and Cleveland being directly connected by a Baltimore and Ohio Railroad line, were enough to convince Cleveland investigator Peter Merylo that the Pittsburgh murders were also the work of the Torso Murderer. In addition, the Swamp Murders seem to have stopped in 1934, before resuming in 1939; this gap in the Pittsburgh murders seems to correspond closely with the Torso Killings in Cleveland, which officially began in 1935, and ended in 1938.

In addition to the Swamp Murders, the headless body of an unidentified male was found in a boxcar in New Castle, Pennsylvania, on July 1, 1936. Almost four years later, on May 3, 1940, three headless victims were found in boxcars near McKees Rocks, Pennsylvania. All bore similar injuries to those inflicted by the Torso Murderer, and it was considered possible (but not proven) that the victims had been killed in Cleveland, then hidden in the boxcars to be sent on to Pennsylvania.

== Possible link to Black Dahlia Murder ==
In December 1938, someone claiming to be the Torso Murderer sent a letter to Ness, saying he had moved to California and killed a woman there and had buried the head in Los Angeles. In the letter, the author referred to himself as a "DC", or Doctor of Chiropractic. An investigation uncovered animal bones.

After the 1947 murder of Elizabeth Short, known in Los Angeles as the Black Dahlia case, authorities investigated any possible connection between in her death and the Cleveland murders. Both Short and the Torso Murderer victims had been dismembered and thoroughly cleaned after death. However, Short was not decapitated, as was a signature for the Cleveland victims. Furthermore, the Short murder took place nearly a decade after the letter was received. Aside from circumstantial evidence and sheer speculation, there is nothing connecting Short to the Torso Murderer.

== Suspects ==
Authorities interrogated around 9,100 people during the search to find the Torso Murderer. There were only two main suspects: Frank Dolezal and Francis Sweeney.

=== Frank Dolezal ===
On August 24, 1939, a Cleveland resident named Frank Dolezal (May 4, 1887 – August 24, 1939) was arrested as a suspect in Polillo's murder. Dolezal had lived with Polillo, and also had connections to Andrassy and Wallace. Suspicion was aroused by his peculiar behavior, and large collection of knives.

Dolezal initially confessed to killing Polillo in self-defense. He later retracted the confession, claiming it had been beaten out of him. Soon after, Dolezal was found hanged in his cell at Cuyahoga County jail, while in the custody of Sheriff Martin O'Donnell. Officially labelled a suicide, rumors persist he was murdered.

Dolezal was posthumously exonerated of involvement in the Torso slayings.

=== Francis Sweeney ===
The other leading suspect was Dr. Francis Edward “Frank” Sweeney (May 5, 1894 – July 9, 1964). He was a veteran of World War I, who was part of a medical unit that conducted amputations in the field and at one point suffered nerve damage from a gas attack. After the war, Sweeney became an alcoholic, which was attributed to post-traumatic stress disorder from his wartime experiences. His heavy drinking began in 1929. By 1934 his alcoholism led to a separation from his wife.

Ness personally interviewed Sweeny. Before the interrogation, Sweeny was so intoxicated he was held in a hotel room for three days until he was sober enough for questioning. Under questioning, Sweeney is said to have "failed to pass" two polygraph tests administered by Leonarde Keeler. Based on the polygraph tests, Keeler told Ness that Sweeney was the culprit. Ness apparently felt there was little chance of obtaining a successful prosecution, however. Sweeney was a cousin of one of Ness' political opponents, U.S. Congressman Martin L. Sweeney, who had hounded Ness publicly about his failure to catch the killer. (Note: Congressman Sweeney's daughter married the son of Cuyahoga County Sheriff Martin O'Donnell (1886–1941), who had earlier faced scrutiny for the death of Frank Dolezal in his custody.)

After Sweeney committed himself to an institution, there were no more leads or connections that police could assign to him as a possible suspect. From his confinement, Sweeney sent threatening postcards to Ness and his family into the 1950s. The postcards stopped arriving only after Ness' death in 1957.

Sweeney died in a veterans' hospital in Dayton, Ohio, on July 9, 1964.

While Sweeney was considered a viable suspect, the evidence against him was entirely circumstantial. In 1929, Sweeney was a surgical resident at St. Alexis Hospital in the Kingsbury Run area. He also had an office on the same street where a man named Emil Fronek claimed a doctor had tried to drug him in 1934. Fronek's story was ultimately discounted as he could not relocate the building with police the following day. Upon finding a victim with drugs in her system and looking through buildings, it was found that Sweeney did have an office next to a coroner, in the area where Fronek had suggested he had been drugged. Sweeney would practice in their morgue, which would have been a clean and convenient location to kill victims.

=== Willie Johnson ===
In addition to Dolezal and Sweeney, authorities also considered Willie Johnson, a black male who committed a similar murder in June 1942. Johnson had been spotted by a young girl while disposing of a trunk, which was later found to contain the torso of Margaret Frances Wilson (19). Wilson's head and arms were found in nearby bushes, while her legs would be found at Johnson's home two weeks later. In addition to Wilson's murder bearing similarities to the Torso killings, Johnson was alleged to have had connections to at least two of the Torso Murderer's identified victims. Charles Sadoti, who operated a bootleg joint, identified Johnson in a line-up as being the partner of Rose Wallace. Sadoti stated that the pair had entered his store in August 1936, two weeks before Wallace's disappearance, and that he'd had to stop Johnson from beating Wallace in the car park. Johnson may also have known Florence Polillo; an informant claimed Polillo had argued with a black man nicknamed "one-armed Willie" the day before her murder, and a man of the same nickname was alleged to have been in a relationship with Rose Wallace. Despite these alleged links, as well as Coroner Samuel Gerber touting Johnson as a good suspect, he was never conclusively linked to the Torso murders. Johnson was tried and convicted of Wilson's murder and, after a lengthy psychological evaluation, executed by electric chair on March 10, 1944.

=== Other suspects ===
On August 11, 1937, Merylo dubbed an unnamed suspect as a "likely and best suspect in the murders". A stream of tips about the man led to his identification at the West 23rd. This individual was alleged to have been a sadist who would pay prostitutes to cut off chicken's heads and masturbate to the sight. Merylo took fingerprints and photographs of the suspect in an interview, where Merylo also displayed crime scene photographs which made the suspect complain: "He could never watch or permit any human hurt."

In 1997, another theory postulated that there may have been no single Torso Murderer—that the killings could have been committed by different people. This was based on the assumption that the autopsy results were inconclusive. Merylo believed that the Torso Murderer could have been a transient who was riding the rails, as most of the murders occurred near railroad tracks, and believed this was why there were murders in other states that were similar to the killings in Cleveland. Merylo went undercover as a hobo to investigate this idea.

== Popular culture ==
The 2018 film The Kingsbury Run was based on a modern copycat of the murders. The murders and the hunt for the perpetrators were also covered in an episode of Unsolved Mysteries. The award-winning graphic novel Torso written by Brian Michael Bendis tells the hunt for the killer by Eliot Ness.

American author John Peyton Cooke wrote a fictionalized account of the murders in his novel Torsos, which was a finalist for the Lambda Literary Award for Best Gay Men's Mystery for 1993, and was noted by Marilyn Stasio in The New York Times Book Review for its atmospheric depiction of Cleveland, Ohio, during the Great Depression.

The Unknown Beloved by Amy Harmon is a fictionalized treatment of the Cleveland Torso Murders.

American Demon, written by author Daniel Stashower, details the murders and the subsequent investigation by Eliot Ness.

Trail of Cthulhu, a tabletop role-playing game inspired by the works of horror writer H. P. Lovecraft, contains an introductory adventure in the first edition rulebook entitled The Kingsbury Horror which is based on the Torso Murders.

The 1998 video game Black Dahlia, despite its name, was inspired by the murders but moved the setting to 1941 involving Nazis and the occult. The famous Eliot Ness and Cleveland lead Detective Peter Merylo, who both investigated the murders, appears in the game.

== See also ==
- Orley May – detective who worked on the case.
- Thames Torso Murders – another series of murders in which the torsos of victims were left behind.

General:

- List of fugitives from justice who disappeared
- List of serial killers in the United States
