= Sandsdalen =

Sandsdalen is a surname. Notable people with the surname include:

- Halvor J. Sandsdalen (1911–1998), Norwegian farmer, journalist, poet, novelist, playwright, and children's writer
- Ingebjørg Kasin Sandsdalen (1915–2003), Norwegian poet and politician
