= Morgan Kornmo =

Norwegian politician

Morgan Kornmo (17 April 1925–26 March 2010) was a Norwegian evangelist and politician for the Christian Democratic Party.

He was born in Porsgrunn, and served as a Pentecostal evangelist from 1942. He was assistant pastor of the Filadelfia Oslo Pentecostal church from 1952 to 1959, pastor in Skien from 1959 to 1968, pastor in Trondheim from 1968 to 1971, and pastor of Filadelfia Oslo from 1971 to 1989. As leader of the largest Pentecostal congregation in the nation's capital, he was a national leader.

In the 1965 Norwegian parliamentary election he was the third candidate on the ballot in Telemark, behind Johannes Østtveit and Olav Søyland and ahead of writer Ingebjørg Kasin Sandsdalen. He was elected as deputy representative for the term 1965–1969. He was later a minor candidate in the 1973 and 1985 elections.

He was married for almost 60 years and had four children. He died in March 2010.
