= Trebol =

Spanish Menorcan Standardbred trotter

- Breed: Standardbred
- Sire: Hot Blues (FR)
- Grandsire: Varik D'Ilcino (FR)
- Dam: Sallly Can Wait
- Damsire: Prince Mystic
- Sex: Male
- Foaled: 2007
- Country: Spain
- Colour: Bay
- Breeder: Cuadra Sa Lamp
- Owner: Cuadra Sa Lamp
- Trainer: FCA. A. Bosch M.
- Record: 155:91-8-11
- Earnings: €691,656

Major wins
- Kymi Grand Prix (2015, 2016); Prix Luxembourg (2016)

Trebol (foaled 2007, Died January 25, 2026) is a Spanish Menorcan Standardbred trotter who was the first Spanish-bred trotter to win an international Grade 1 harness race. Later in his career, he remained on the island of Menorca and raced at its two major tracks. Trebol set a world record of 56 consecutive wins by a Standardbred.

== Background ==
Trebol ("clover" in Spanish) was foaled on the Spanish island of Menorca in 2007. Menorca has two harness tracks: Hipòdrom Municipal De Maó and Hipódromo Torre Del Ram. On these tracks, Trebol began and ended his decade-long racing career.

== Racing career ==
Trebol began his career in 2009 at age two. For his first two years, he raced at Menorca's two tracks before going to the two tracks on the nearby island of Mallorca. Trebol's first 23 starts were in Spain, with 17 wins and a 13-race winning streak; he won at distances from 1600 meters (one mile) to 2700 meters (1 5/8 miles). At the start of his four-year-old season, after winning another race in Spain, Trebol was shipped to France. He finished third in the Group 3 Prix Charles Tiercelin, breaking his win streak. Trebol did not win in France that year, but added another seven wins in Mallorca before he was sidelined by a life-threatening bout of colic.

Trebol returned to racing in France with less success, winning no more than two races a year from 2012 to 2014 but earning most of his lifetime purse money outside Spain. In 2015, at age eight, Trebol finished second in the Group 3 Prix Jean Rene Gougeon. He was then shipped to Finland for the Group 1 Kymi Grand Prix; near the back of the field during the race's first two laps, he came from behind to pass the leader Maven and hold off a late charge from Oasis Bi. Trebol's victory was the first win of an international Group 1 race by a trotter bred in Spain.

Trebol won the Kymi Grand Prix again in 2016, getting up in the final strides for his second (and final) Group 1 victory. Later that year he won the Group 3 Prix Luxembourg, his biggest career win in France. After a winless year of international racing, Trebol was brought back home to Spain to race at Mallorca's Hippodrome San Pardo and easily won a 3,150-metre (1.96 mi) race. It was originally meant to be his final career start.

=== Winning streak ===
After his win at San Pardo, Trebol returned to his birthplace on Menorca. Alternating between Hipòdrom Municipal De Maó and Hipódromo Torre Del Ram, he raced for much smaller purses than in France. Trebol also raced more frequently, winning all 28 of his 2018 starts at age 11. His winning streak began to receive widespread attention at the start of his 12-year-old season, when it approached the world record.

Trebol surpassed San Simeon's winning streak of 29 when he was 11 years old. He tied the record set by Carty Nagle, an American pacer who won 41 consecutive races in 1938, by his fifth start as a 12-year-old on April 15, 2019. The Swedish cold-blooded trotter Järvsöfaks had won 42 consecutive races. Trebol won his 42nd straight race, equaling Järvsöfak's win streak, on April 22 – only a week after his 41st victory. He attempted to win his 43rd consecutive race, a harness-racing record, on May 6. Trebol was at or near the lead throughout the race, holding off a challenge at the top of the stretch to win by a length.

Trebol extended his winning streak to 50 in late July, approaching records set by thoroughbreds: 54 by the undefeated Kincsem and 56 by Camarero, a small Puerto Rican racehorse who set his record during the 1950s. With three wins in August and three more in September, Trebol had won 55 straight races and Camarero's record was in sight. He came from behind, as usual, to tie Camarero's record of 56. Trebol finished a well-beaten third eight days later, finally ending his winning streak. He returned to racing a month later, finishing second. A week after that, he returned to his winning ways and ended the year (and his career) with three straight wins. At the end of the season he had won 23 of 25 races, and was retired after winning 59 of his last 61 starts.
