= Halvor J. Sandsdalen =

Norwegian farmer, journalist, poet, novelist, playwright and children's writer

- Born: 12 January 1911; Seljord Municipality, Norway
- Died: 9 July 1998 (aged 87)
- Occupations: farmer, journalist, poet, novelist, playwright, children's writer, and a local politician
- Spouse: Ingebjørg Kasin Sandsdalen

Halvor Johannesson Sandsdalen (12 January 1911 – 9 July 1998) was a Norwegian farmer, journalist, poet, novelist, playwright and children's writer. He was also a proponent for Nynorsk, and a local politician.

== Personal life ==
Sandsdalen was born in Seljord Municipality, the son of farmer Johannes T. Sandsdalen and Hæge Vetlesdotter Kjøta. He married poet Ingebjørg Kasin in 1938.

== Career ==
Sandsdalen was a part-time journalist for the newspaper Telemark Arbeiderblad from 1945 to 1962. From 1962 he was full-time journalist for Varden, where he edited the supplement Telemark Tidend. Among his poetry collections are Det syng i skog og li from 1945, Mannen og moldi from 1946, the prize-winning Kantate ved Skien 600 års jubileum from 1958, and Relieff from 1968. Sigmund Groven and Ivar Medaas have composed melodies to some of his poems, and among his most popular songs are "Kom sol" and "Gje meg jorda til bustad". In 1998 Geirr Lystrup issued the album Kom sol på alle mine berg with lyrics by Sandsdalen and music by Sigmund Groven.

Among his plays are Anne Gonge from 1957 and Kari Sulto from 1958. He also wrote audio plays for radio. Among his children's books are Gygra i Skorvefjell from 1957 and Under eventyrhatt from 1964. His books on local history and folklore include Ormen i Seljordsvatnet from 1976, about the sea serpent living in Seljordsvatnet according to local tradition, Hundre folkeminne frå Seljord from 1982, Trollebotn from 1983, and Frå Kivlemøyan til Brurebergi from 1989. He also spent time on painting, and was a friend of painter Harald Kihle. He was a secretary for Telemark Mållag for fifteen years, and chaired the local chapter of the Labour Party.

Sandsdalen was awarded the cultural prize of the county of Telemark in 1990, and the King's Medal of Merit in gold in 1996. Sandsdalen's poem about the Telemark cattle has been displayed on a stone erected at Dyrskuplassen in Seljord.
