= Lindeqvist =

Lindeqvist is a surname. Notable people with the surname include:

- Johan Lindeqvist (1823–1898), Swedish agronomist
- Katri Lindeqvist (born 1980), Finnish orienteering competitor
