= Ingebjørg Kasin Sandsdalen =

Norwegian poet and politician

Ingebjørg Kasin Sandsdalen (6 September 1915 – 4 September 2003) was a Norwegian poet and politician for the Christian Democratic Party.

She was born in Seljord Municipality, and in 1938 she married poet and farmer Halvor J. Sandsdalen (1911–1998). Her debut was Hjarta av jord in 1950, and her last work was Jord og tid in 2001. She wrote twenty poetry collections and eight books of poetic prose. In 1996 she was decorated with the King's Medal of Merit in gold.

For the 1965 Norwegian parliamentary election she was the fourth candidate on the ballot in Telemark, behind Johannes Østtveit, Olav Søyland and Morgan Kornmo. She was elected as a deputy representative for the term 1965–1969. She was later the ninth candidate at the 1973 election.
