= NRF =

NRF may refer to:

- National Redemption Front, rebel alliance in Darfur
- National Research Foundation (South Africa)
- National Research Foundation of Korea
- National Resistance Front, Afghan resistance military organization
- National Response Framework
- National Retail Federation
- National Revolutionary Faction, a former UK political group
- NATO Response Force
- Naval Reactors Facility, Idaho National Laboratory, US
- Neighbourhood Renewal Fund
- Norwegian Red, a breed of cattle
- Nouvelle Revue Française, a literary magazine
- nrf, the ISO 639-3 code for Jèrriais and Guernésiais languages

== See also ==
- NRF1, Nuclear Respiratory Factor
