= North Swedish Horse =

Swedish breed of horse

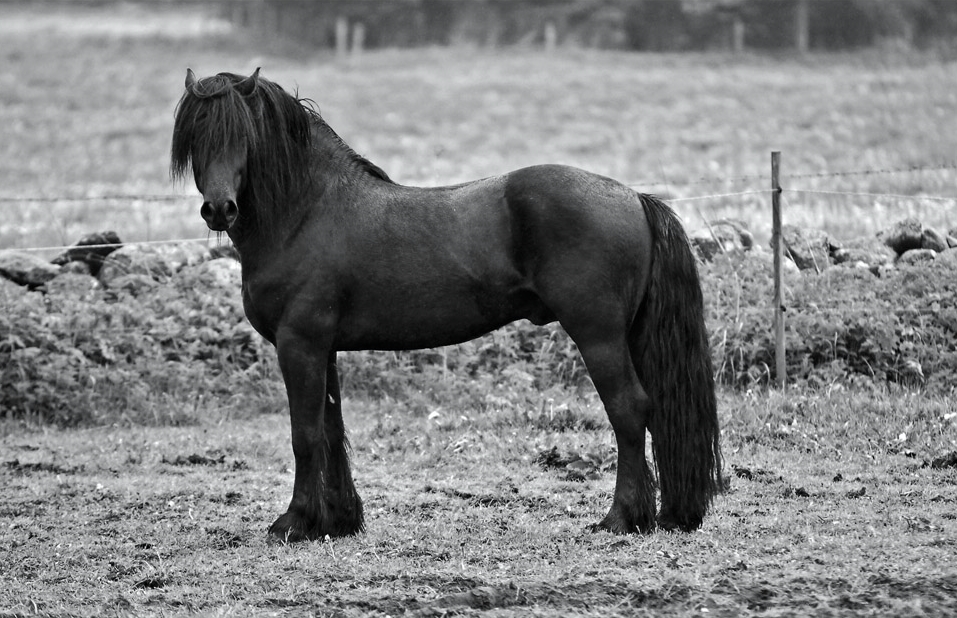

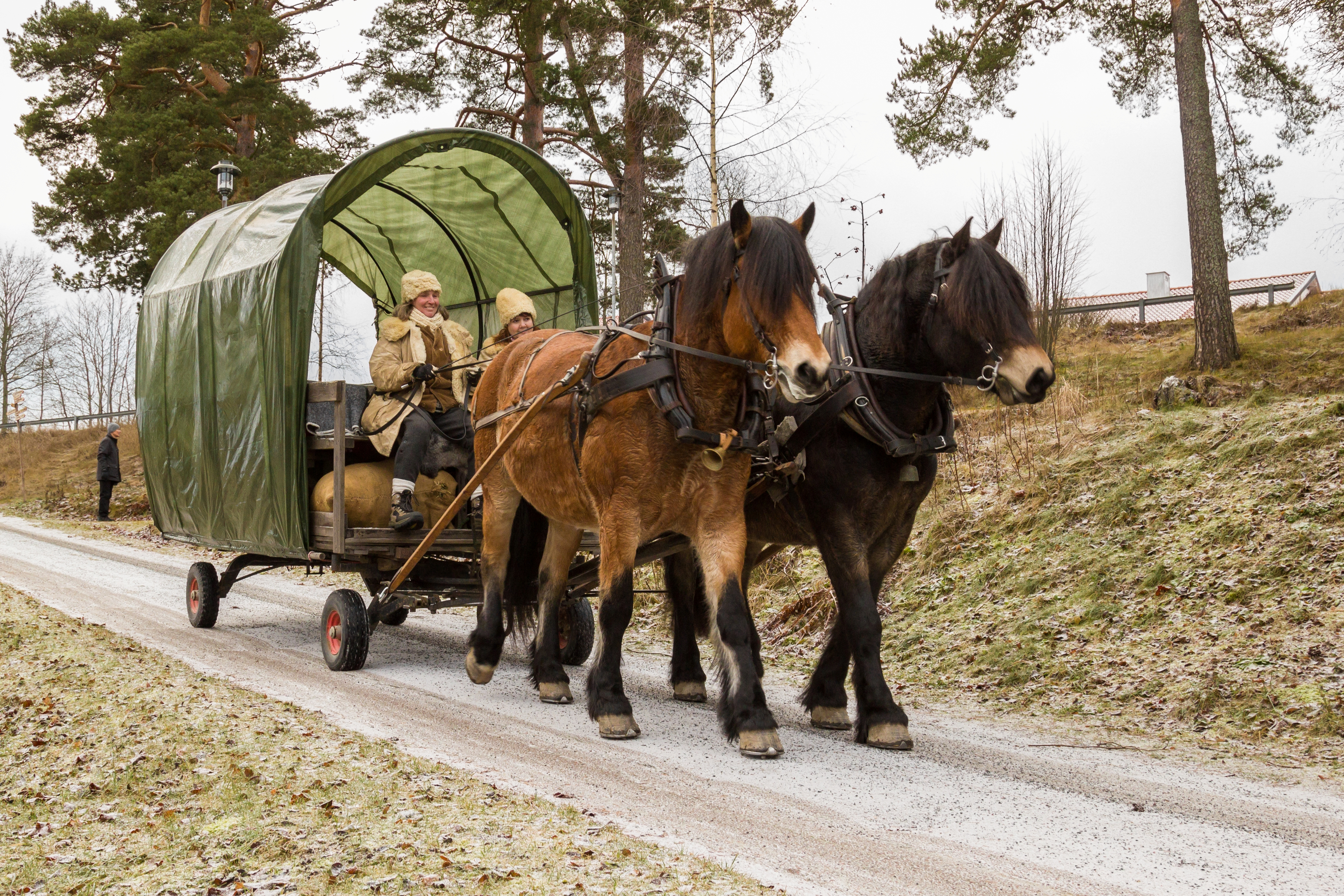
- Conservation status: Vulnerable (NordGen 2024); At risk/endangered (DAD-IS 2023)
- Other names: Swedish: Nordsvensk Brukshäst; Swedish: Nordsvensk Häst
- Country of origin: Sweden
- Use: driving; draught work; forestry; agriculture; trotting races

Traits
- Weight: 500–750 kg
- Height: 152 to 158 centimetres (15.0 to 15.2 hands; 60 to 62 in)
- Colour: solid colours

Breed standards
- Föreningen Nordsvenska Hästen

The North Swedish Horse or Swedish: Nordsvensk Brukshäst is a Swedish breed of small heavy horse. It is closely related to the similar Dølehest breed of Norway. It was traditionally used for forestry and agricultural work. Lighter lines are bred for harness racing, and are registered in the stud-book of the Svensk Kallblodstravare (Swedish Coldblood Trotter).

== Characteristics ==
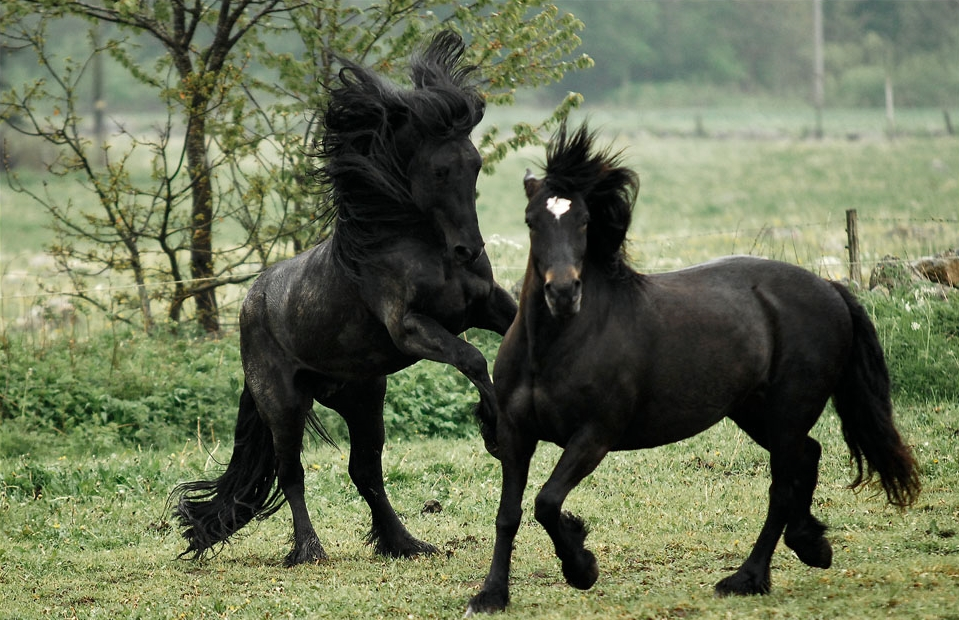
Stallion and mare

The North Swedish Horse is a sturdy, cold-blooded breed known for its strength, endurance, and calm temperament. It is compact and muscular, with a broad chest and strong legs, a well-proportioned head with a straight or slightly convex profile, a thick and often wavy mane and tail, and hard durable hooves. Common colors include bay, black, chestnut, and dun. It has an energetic, long-strided trot. The horses are gentle and willing, long-lived and generally healthy.

== Breed history ==
The origins of the North Swedish Horse are not clear. It appears to derive from selective breeding of local horses, possibly with some influence from Friesian stock in the distant past. During the nineteenth century there was considerable cross-breeding of Swedish rural horses with imported stock of various types, both light and heavy, to the point that it was feared that the original type might be lost. In Dalarna a local veterinary surgeon named Wilhelm Hallander Hedemora started a movement to recover and preserve the remaining stock. Dølehest stallions were imported from Norway, and in 1900 the breed was officially recognised as the Nordsvenska Hästen. In 1903 a stud farm was established at Wången, in Alsen in Krokom Municipality in Jämtland. A stud-book was started in 1909, and the first volume published in 1915.

In 1966 the breed was divided into two subtypes – a lighter type suitable for trotting, and a heavier one better suited to forestry work.

In the twenty-first century, breeding of the North Swedish horse is strictly controlled, and animals intended for breeding are thoroughly tested, principally for good character, pulling capacity and fertility. The legs and hooves are examined by X-ray.

== Use ==
The North Swedish Horse is one of the few cold-blood breeds used in harness racing. Lighter North Swedish lines bred as trotters are registered in the stud-book of the Svensk Kallblodstravare or Swedish Coldblood Trotter. A world speed record for coldblood trotters of 1:17.9 per kilometre was set in 2005 by Järvsöfaks, who was partly of Swedish and partly of Dølehest lineage.

Heavier North Swedish horses are well suited to agricultural and forestry work. They are also used for recreational riding and driving.
