= Norwegian Red =

Norwegian breed of cattle

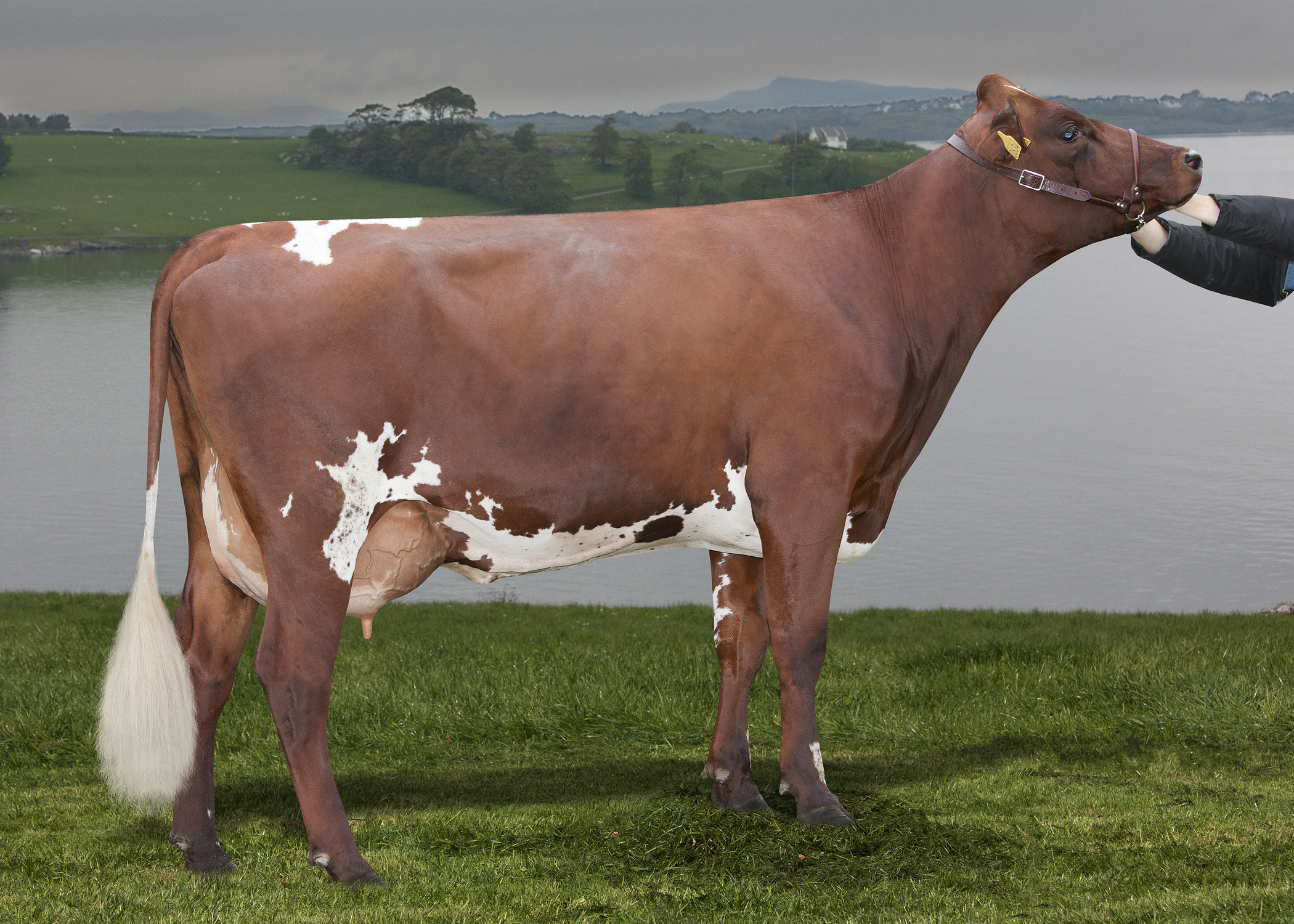
- A cow
- Conservation status: FAO (2007): not at risk
- Other names: Norsk Rødt Fe; Norsk Raudt Fe; Norwegian Dairy Cattle; Norwegian Red Cattle
- Country of origin: Norway
- Distribution: Norway; Argentina; Netherlands
- Use: dairy

Traits
- Weight: Male: 1000 kg; Female: 575 kg
- Height: Male: 142 cm; Female: 130 cm
- Coat: red-and-white, black-and-white
- Horn status: polled or horned

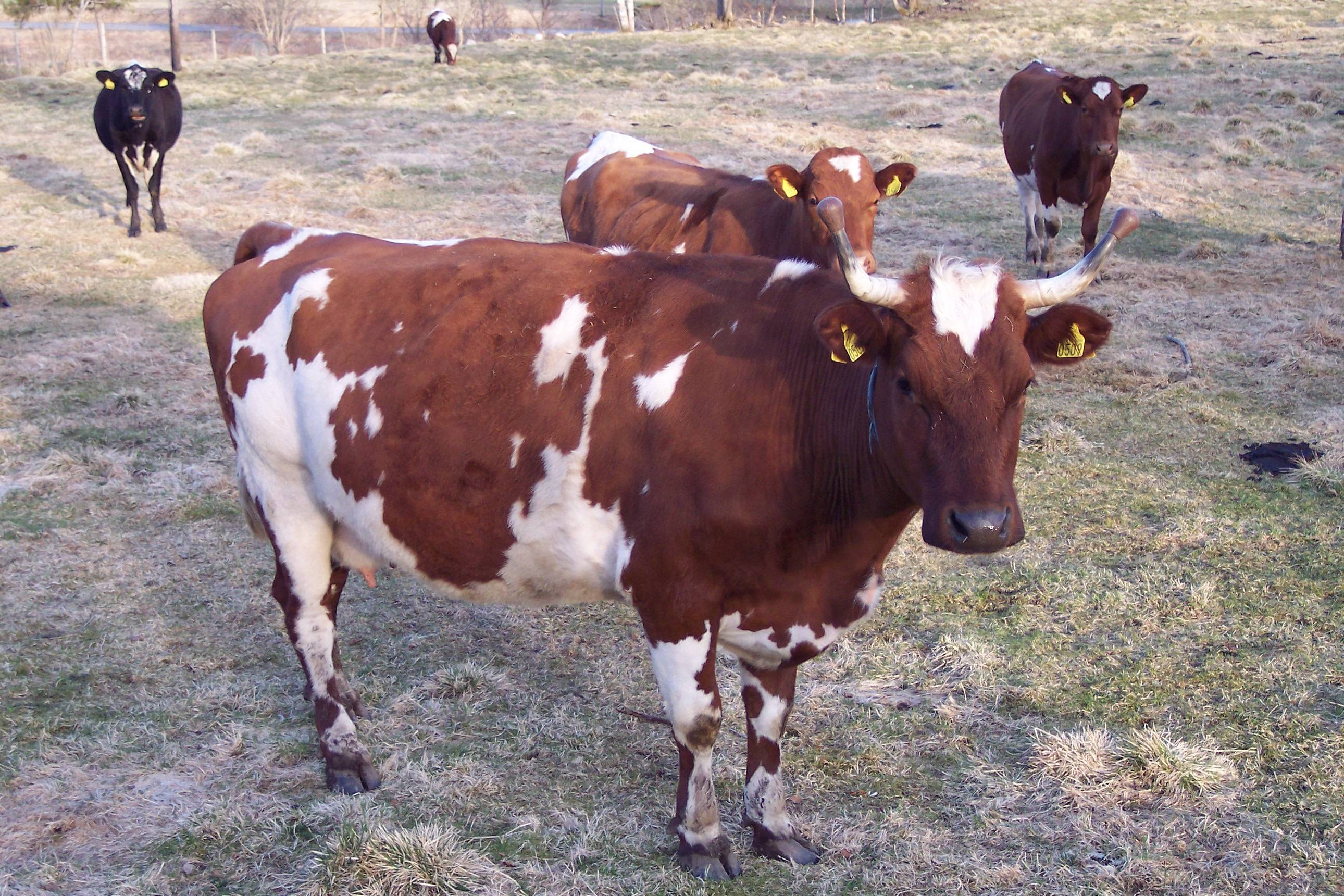
A horned cow

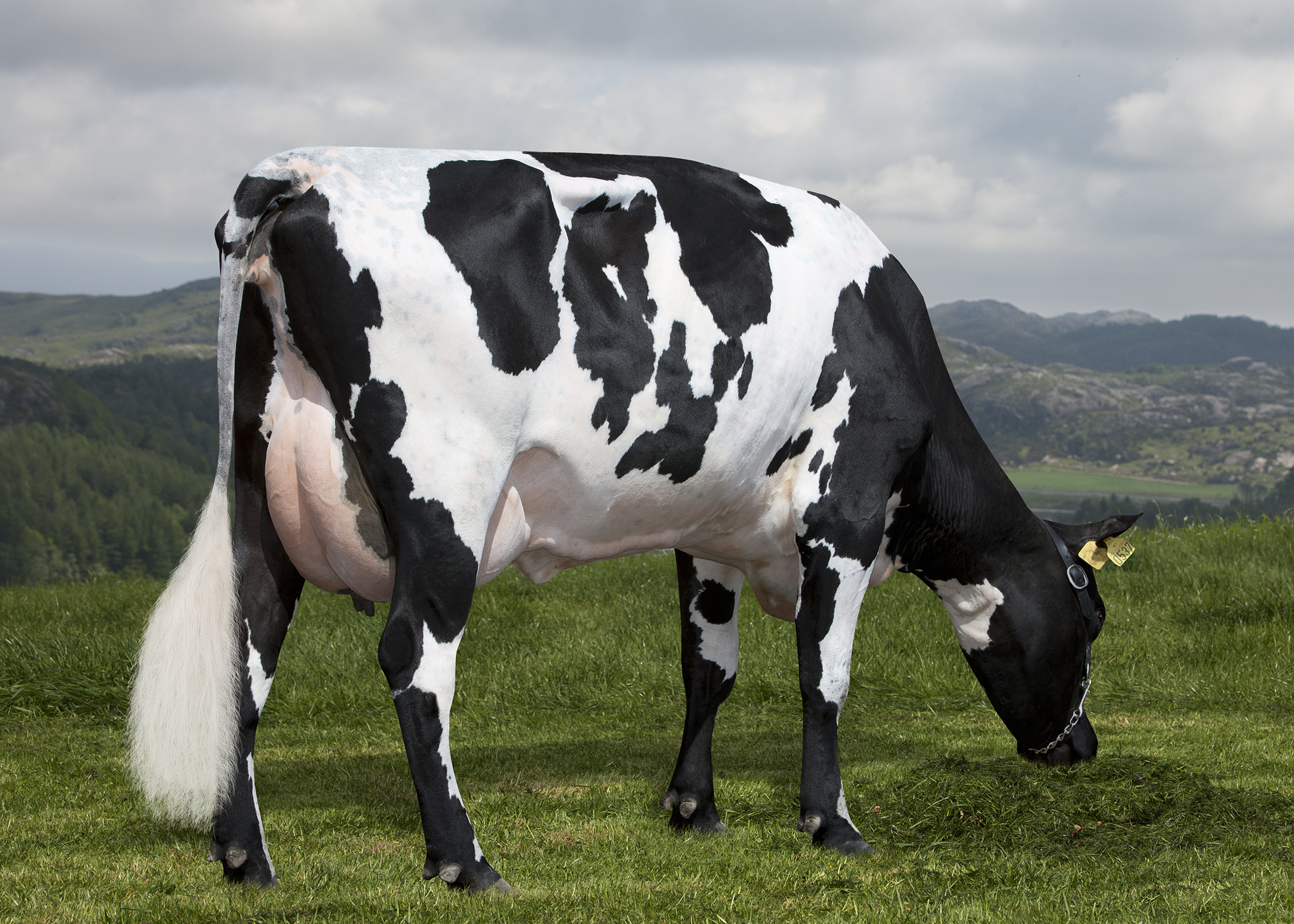
The coat may be black-and-white

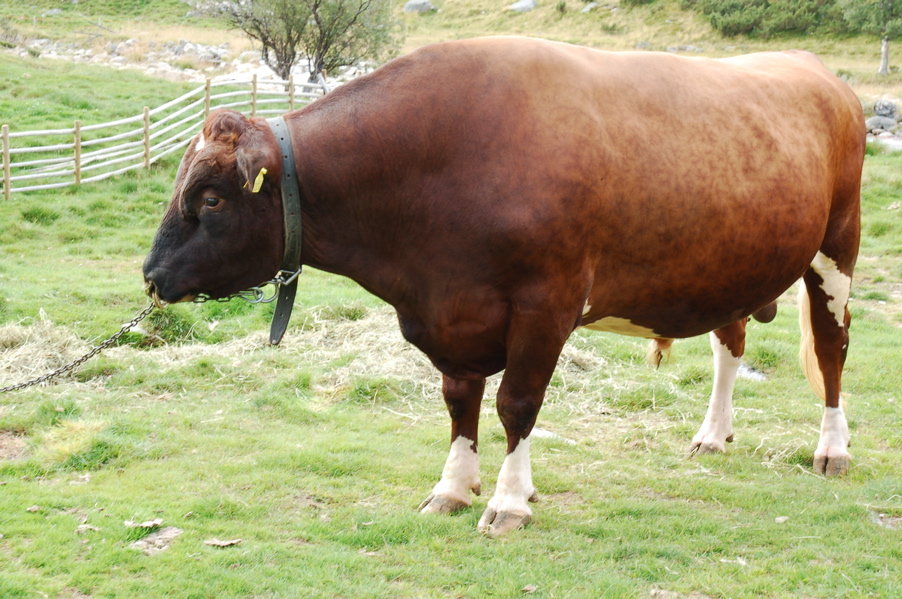
A polled bull

The Norwegian Red or Norsk Raudt Fe is a Norwegian breed of dairy cattle. It was formed in 1961 through successive mergers of various traditional and regional breeds. In 2016 it accounted for approximately 85% of the cattle in the country, and about 99% of the national dairy herd.

The cattle may be either horned or naturally polled; despite the breed name, the coat may be either red-and-white or black-and-white.

== History ==
The Norwegian Red is a modern composite breed. It was formed in 1961 by merging two existing Norwegian breeds, the Red Polled Eastland or Østlansk Rødkolle and the Norwegian Red-and-White or Norsk Rødt og Hvitt Fe. Each of these two was already a composite breed: the Red Polled Eastland was recorded from 1892 and later underwent cross-breeding with Swedish Red-and-White and Ayrshire, with some influence from the Dutch Black Pied; the Norwegian Red-and-White, established in 1939, also derived from cross-breeding of Swedish Red-and-White and Ayrshire, but had absorbed the Hedmark and Red Troender. The Red Troender, in turn, derived from cross-breeding in the nineteenth century of local Troender and Røros cattle with Ayrshire stock; it had later absorbed the Målselv (Målselvfe) breed of Tromsø and northern Norway. The Dølafe, originating from local cattle of south-east Norway, Telemark (Telemarksfe) and Ayrshire, was merged into the Norwegian Red in 1963. It was followed in 1968 by the South and West Norwegian or Sør og Vestlandsfe, which had been created in 1947 by fusion of the Vestland Fjord (Vestlandsk Fjordfe), the Vestland Red Polled (Vestlandsk Raudkolle) and the Lyngdal (Lyngdalsfe).

The cattle have been exported to many countries, among them Australia, Ireland, New Zealand, the United States and Madagascar, where exports began in the 1960s, and where by 2003 there were over 50000 head.

== Characteristics ==
The cattle may be either horned or naturally polled; despite the breed name, the coat may be either red-and-white or black-and-white. Average height at the withers is about 130 cm for cows and about 142 cm for bulls; average bodyweights are 575 kg and 1000 kg respectively.

== Use ==
The cattle are reared principally for milk. The average annual yield is 7125 kg per cow, with an average fat content of 4.24%.

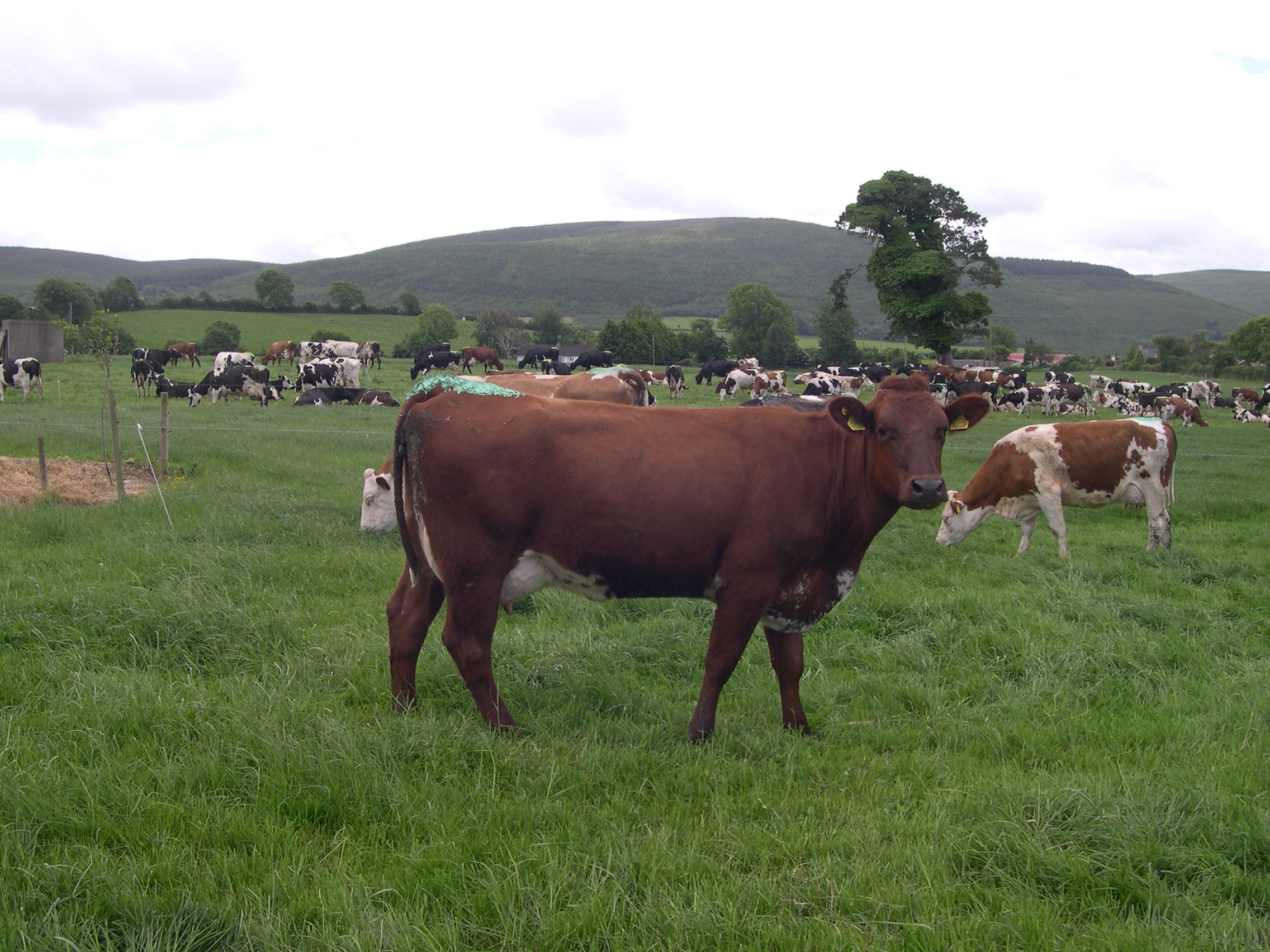
Norwegian Red used for dairy crossbreeding in Ireland

The Norwegian Red has been used to improve some characteristics of other dairy breeds such as the Friesian.
