= Scandinavian Coldblood Trotter =

Scandinavian breed of horse

- Järvsöfaks, a Coldblood Trotter of mixed Swedish and Norwegian lines

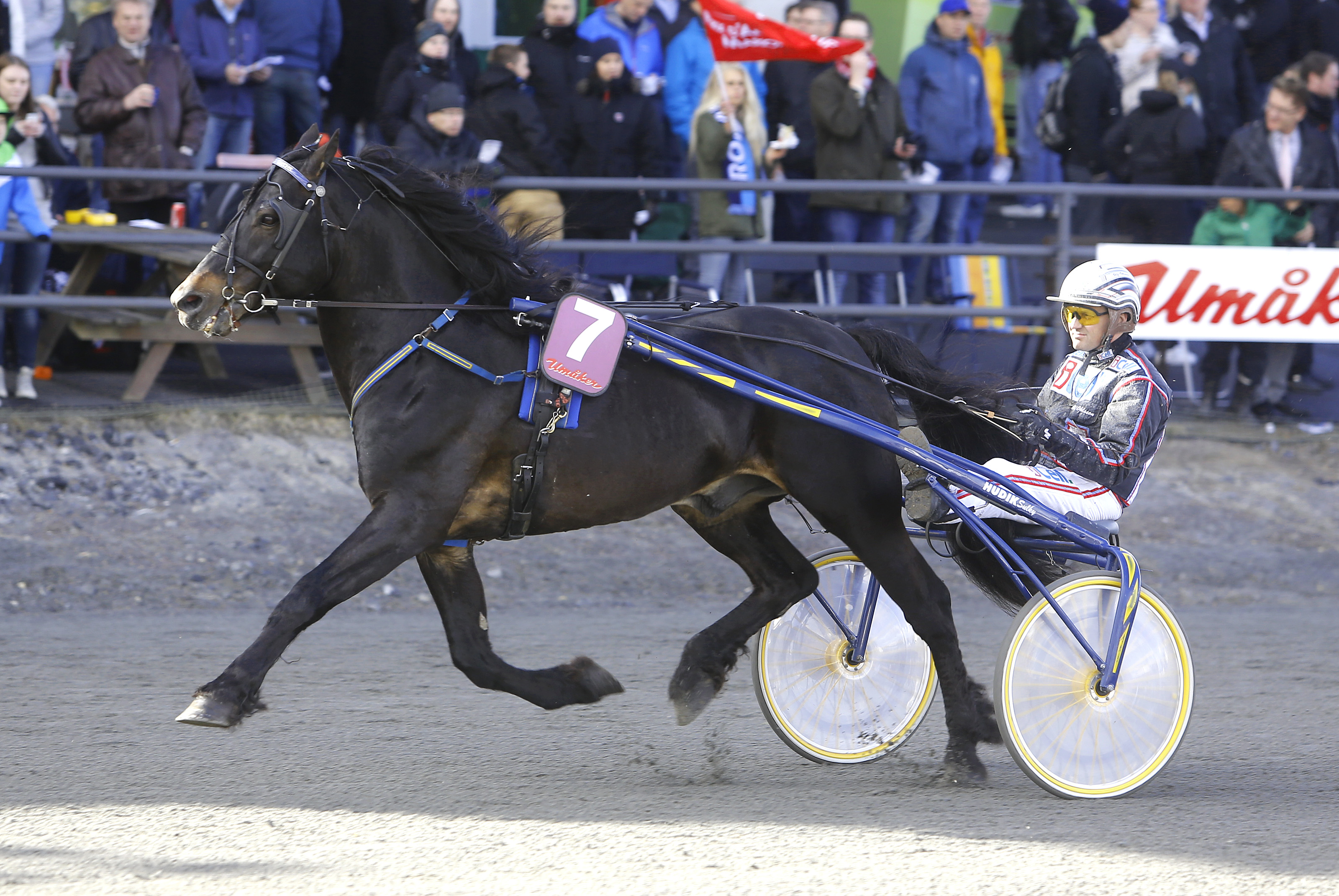
- Hallsta Lotus, a son of Järvsöfaks, and Ulf Ohlsson
- Conservation status: Norway; FAO (2007): not at risk; DAD-IS (2022): at risk/endangered; Sweden; FAO (2007): endangered; DAD-IS (2022): at risk/endangered
- Other names: Norsk Kaldblodstraver; Norwegian Coldblood Trotter; Svensk Kallblodstravare; Swedish Coldblood Trotter; North Swedish Trotter
- Country of origin: Norway; Sweden
- Standard: Det Norske Travselskap, page 11; Svensk Travsport, page 93

Traits
- Height: Norway: minimum: 148 cm (14.2 h); Sweden: 146–159 cm (14.1–15.3 h); Male: average: 154 cm (15.1 h)

The Scandinavian Coldblood Trotter consists of two closely related and interconnected breeds of trotting horse: the Norsk Kaldblodstraver or Norwegian Coldblood Trotter and the Svensk Kallblodstravare, the Swedish Coldblood Trotter or North Swedish Trotter. Coldblood trotters are the result of cross-breeding native coldblooded farm horses – in Norway the Dølehest, in Sweden the North Swedish Horse – with lighter and faster horses. Although the Norwegian and Swedish coldblood trotters are substantially considered a single breed, two national stud-books are maintained, and registration requirements differ in some respects between the two countries.

== History ==
The Scandinavian Coldblood Trotter is the result of cross-breeding of native coldblooded farm horses – in Norway the Dølehest, in Sweden the North Swedish Horse – with lighter and faster horses. Stud-books were started in 1939 in Norway and in 1964 in Sweden. From about 1950 inter-breeding between the two breeds began, to the point that they are now substantially considered to be a single breed.

Both national types are endangered. In 2012 there were 1464 mares and 100 stallions of the Norwegian breed; by 2019 those numbers had fallen to 764 and 64, for a total breeding stock of 828 head. The corresponding numbers for Sweden in 2019 were 1380 and 180. The conservation status of both is reported to DAD-IS as 'at risk/endangered'.

== Characteristics ==
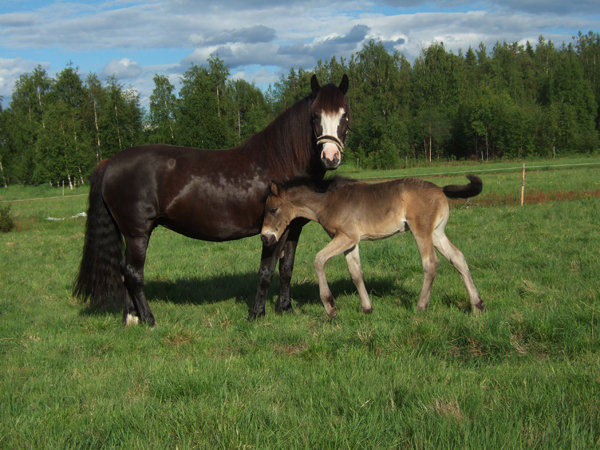
Mare and foal

The Norwegian standard specifies an average height at the withers for stallions of 154 cm, and minimum height for all individuals of 148 cm; the Swedish standard specifies a height range of 146–159 cm. Bay in all its variations is the most common coat colour, followed by chestnut and black. Most other coat colours occur from time to time.

== Uses ==
The Coldblood Trotter is bred for use in harness racing.
