= Johan Lindeqvist =

Swedish agronomist

Johan Lindeqvist (7 October 1823 – 31 July 1898) was a Swedish agronomist. He was born in Skaraborg, Sweden. He served as State Agronomist in Norway from 1855 to 1872. He organized the first exhibition of Telemark cattle in Seljord Municipality in 1866, which marked the start of the annual cattle show Dyrsku'n in Seljord. He is also known for his works on the Dole horse breed. He was decorated Knight of the Order of Vasa in 1867. A bronze relief of Lindeqvist was sculptured by Arne Durban in 1966.
