= Dyrsku'n =

Agricultural show in Seljord, Norway

Dyrsku'n is an annual agricultural show held in Seljord Municipality, Norway. It originates from the first exhibition held in 1866. Dyrsku'n was primarily a showcase for the breed Telemark cattle. Today's show has a wider agricultural scope, and attracts about 70–80,000 visitors.

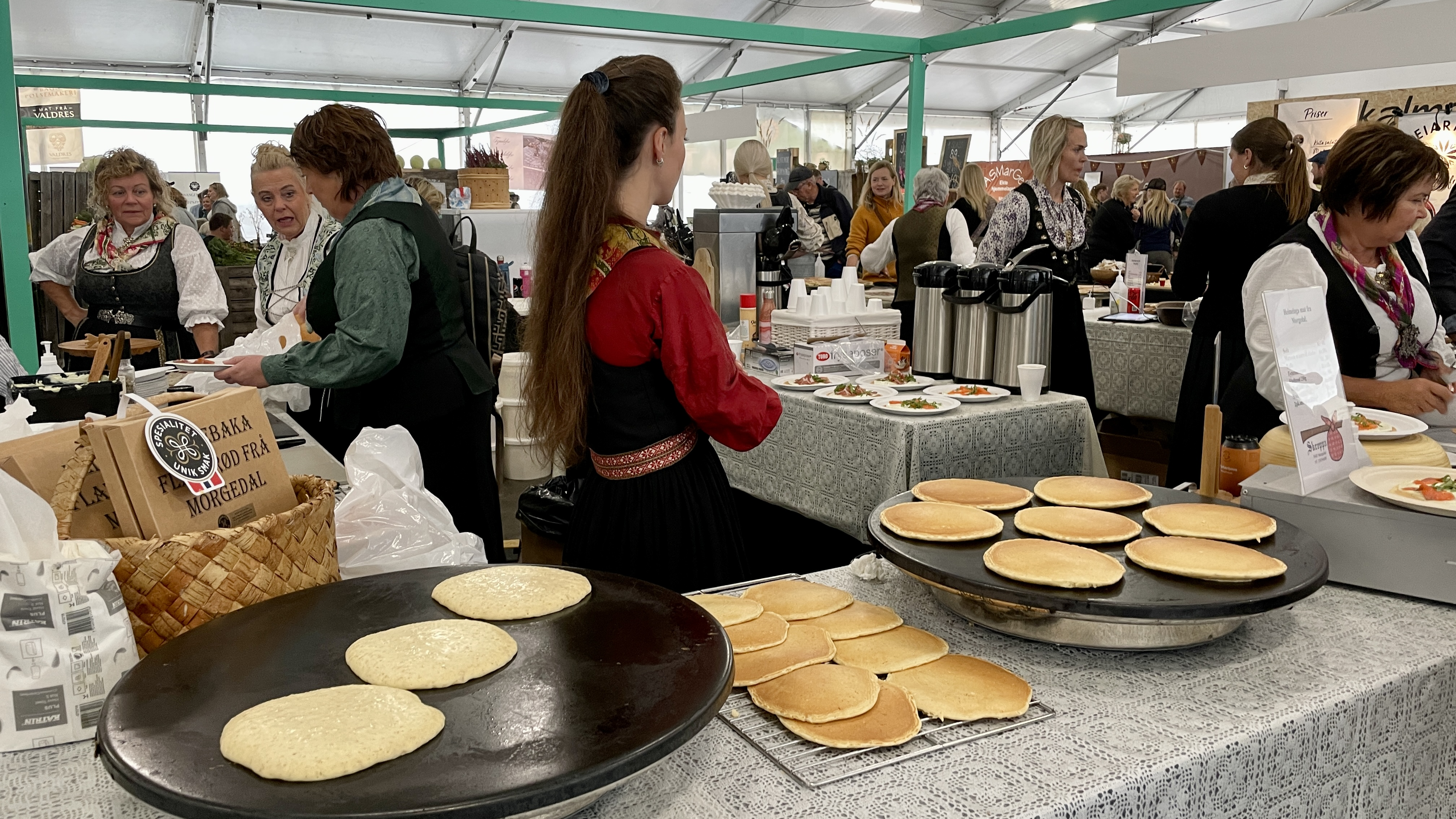
Traditional Norwegian food, served with traditional clothes.

== Name ==
Dyrsku'n is a local dialect form of the word dyreskue in Standard Norwegian, which means "animal showcase." The word dyreskue in itself is a generic term and could, especially in the past, also refer to similar shows elsewhere. A comparable term is fesjå, which means "cattle showcase" in Nynorsk and a number of dialects.

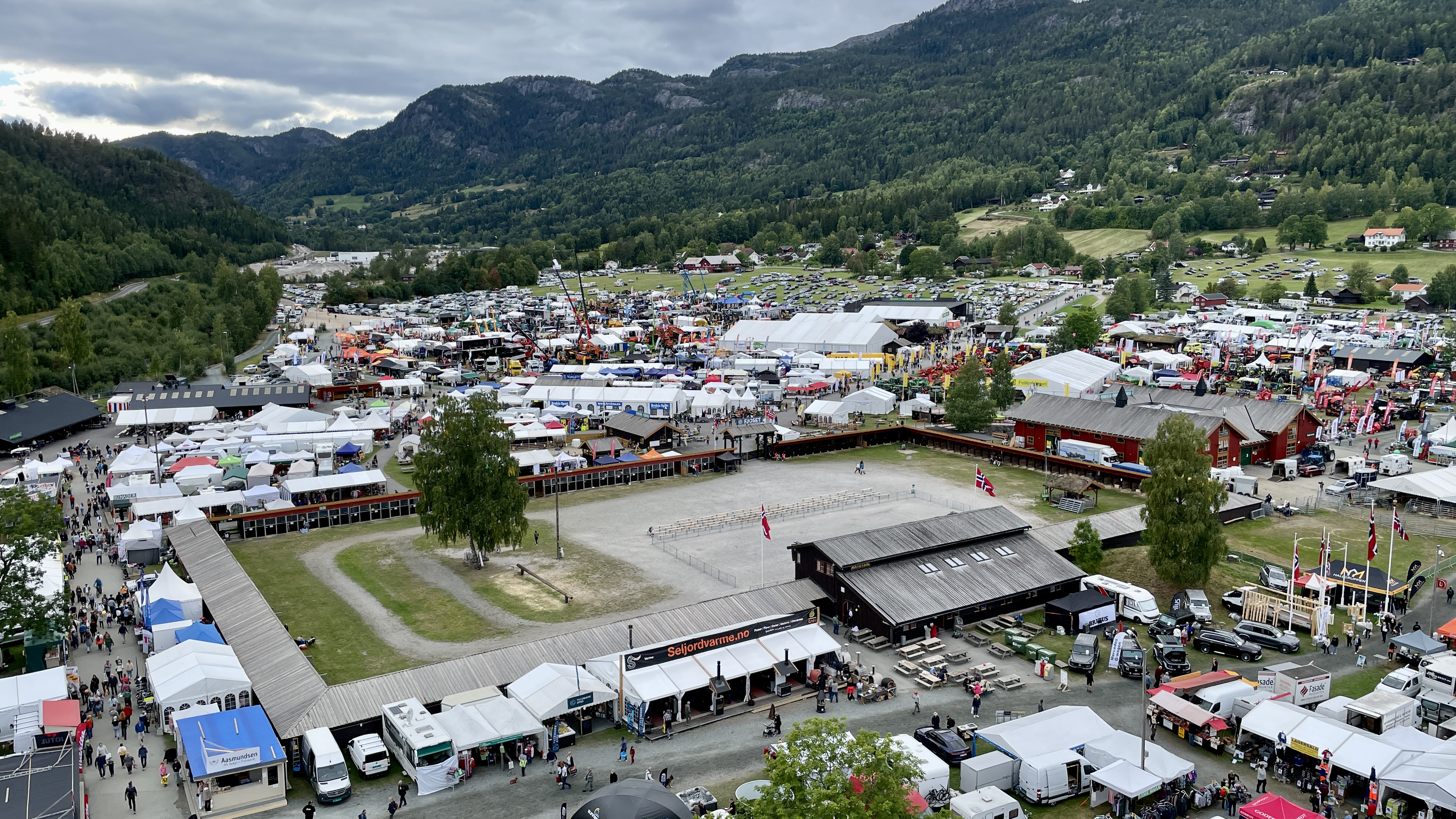
Show overview with the horsestables.

== History ==
In 1866 State Agronomist Johan Lindeqvist organized the first cattle show in Seljord, an exhibition of the breed Telemark cattle. This event was the first of the later annual Dyrsku'n show. The show is held each year in September.

From 1867 the festival had a cowshed with room for 200 cattle. This was expanded to 300 cattle in 1897. From 1947 other cattle breeds were allowed, in addition to the Telemark cattle. In 1962 Dyrsku'n included an exhibition of home arts and crafts articles for the first time. The number of visitors exceeded 20,000 first time in 1970, and 50,000 first time in 1981. In 2002 the number of visitors first time exceeded 75,000.

== Dyrskuplassen ==
The site Dyrskuplassen was donated to Seljord Municipality in 1865 by farmer Even Høyesen. From 1866 the site has been the location of the annual agricultural exhibition Dyrsku'n. The site is an ancient graveyard, and according to publications from the 18th century there were around 150 gravemounds in the area. In 1893 archeologist Nicolay Nicolaysen administered excavation of thirty gravemounds at the site.

In addition to the agricultural exhibition (Dyrsku'n), Dyrskuplassen hosts a variety of activities, such as markets, concerts, religious gatherings and festivals. Among annual summer festivals are the Seljord Festival (thirteenth anniversary in 2013), and the Country Festival (held fifteen times).

== Pictures 2022 ==
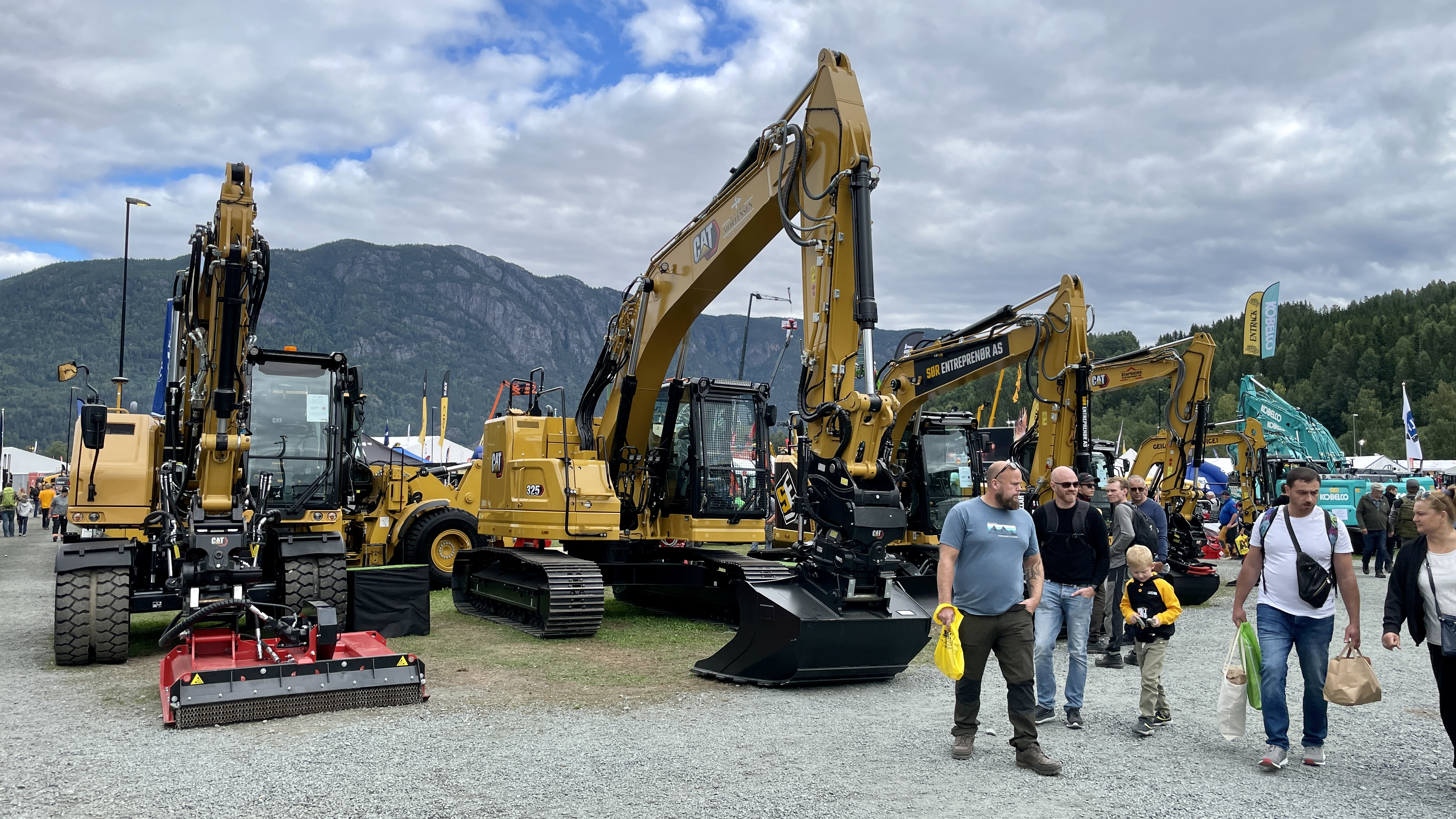
Working machines.

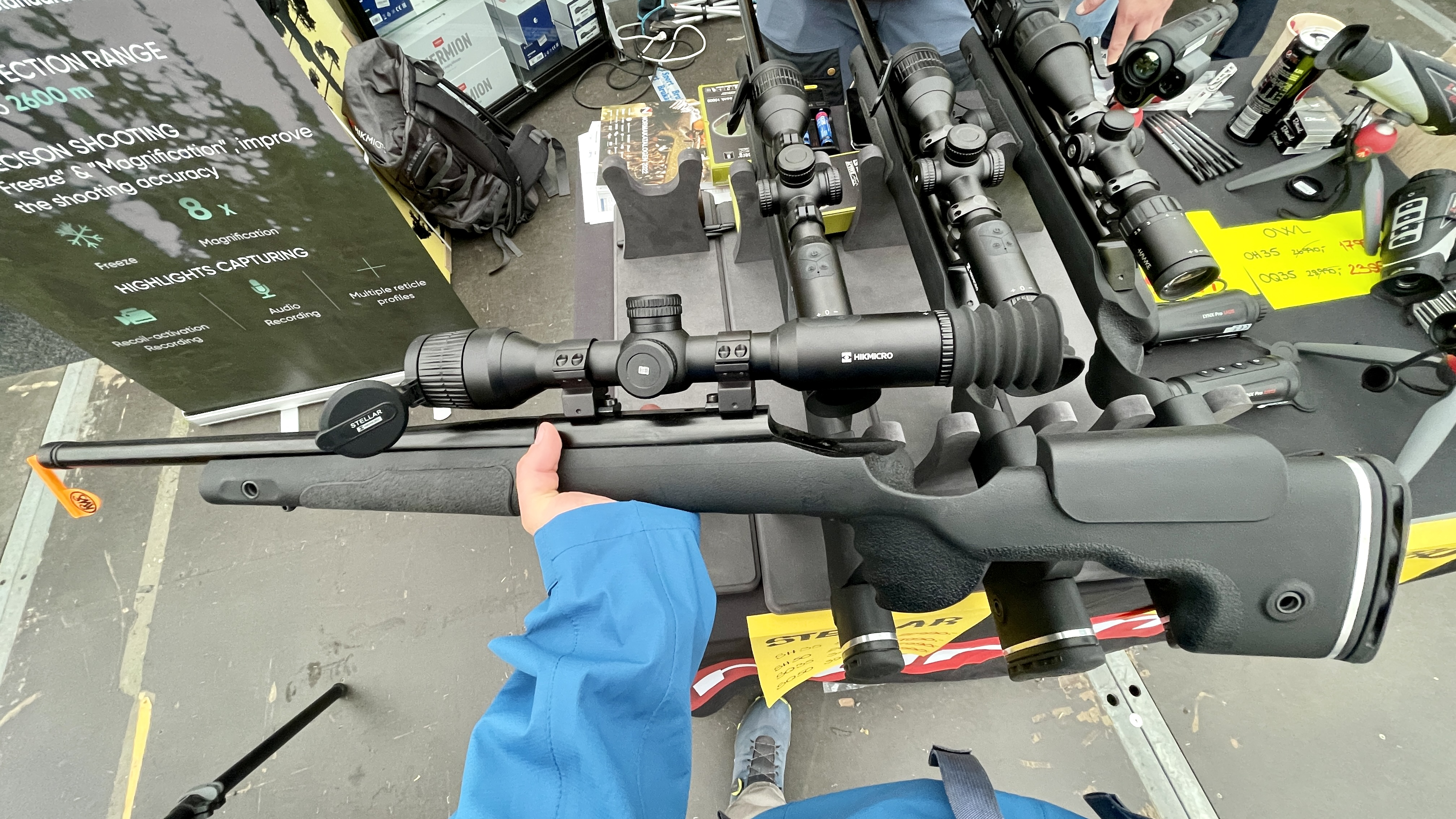
Equipment stores, eG. nightside scopes for rifles.

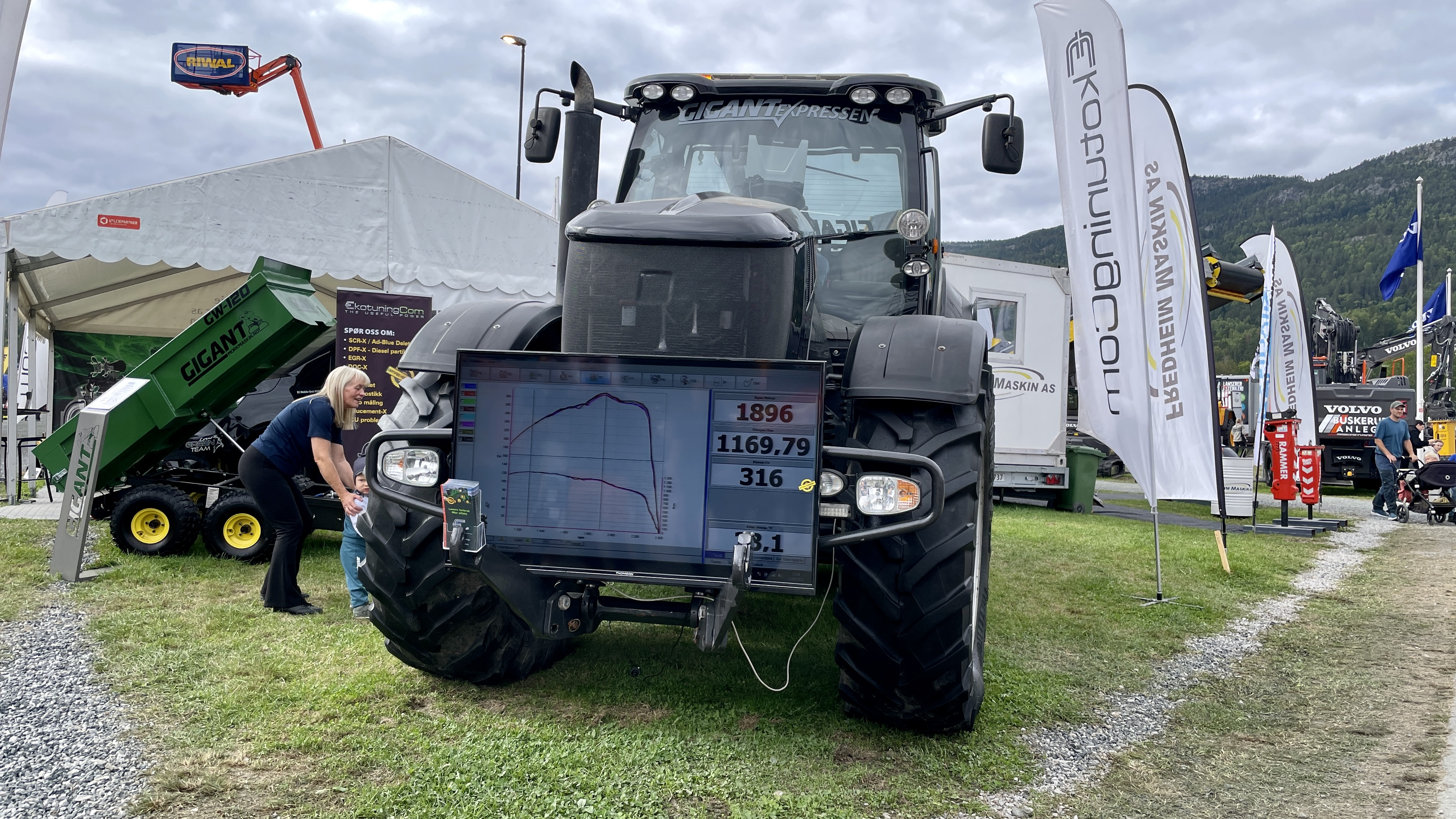
Tuned Valtra tractor.

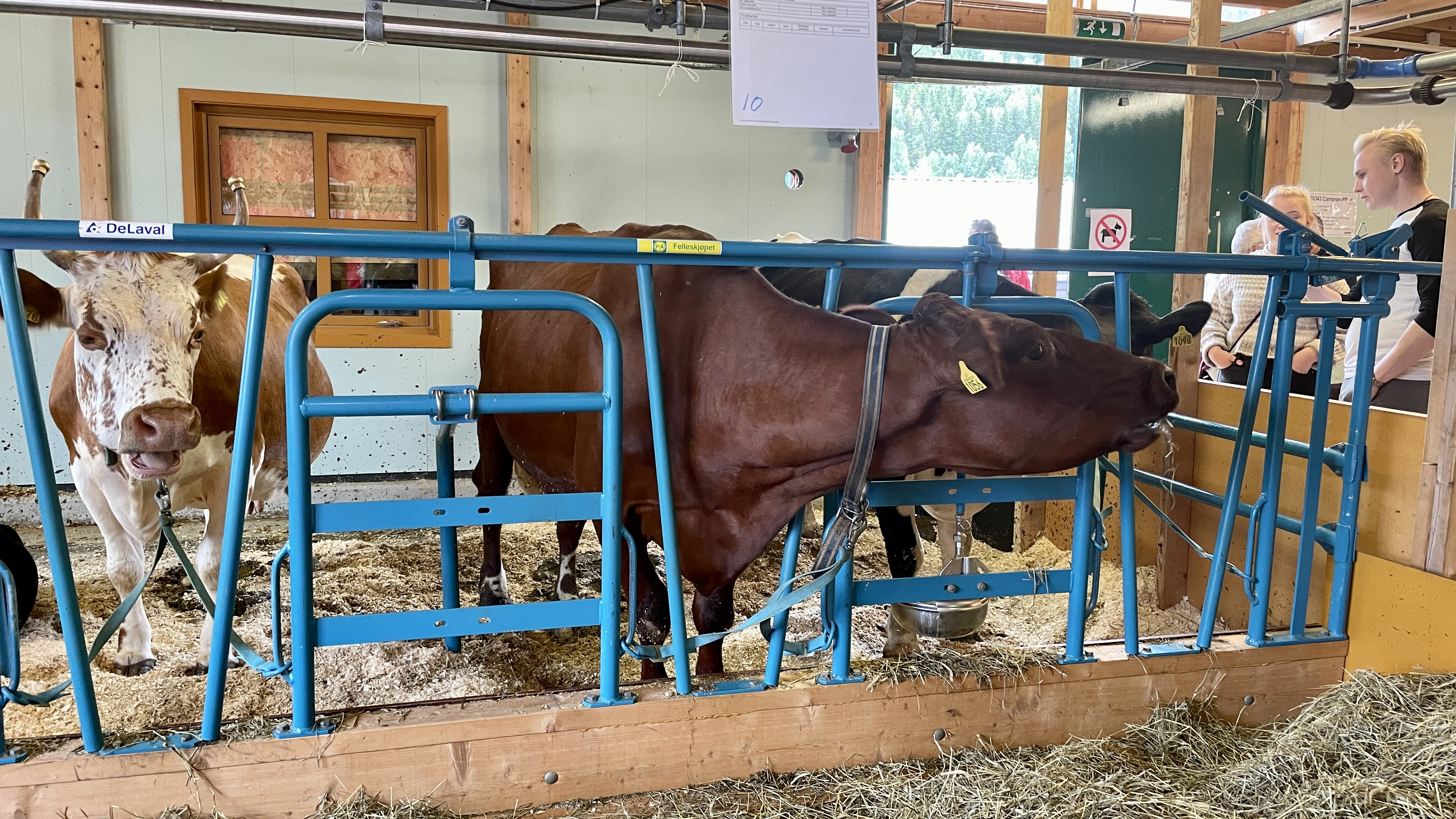
Beautiful cows.

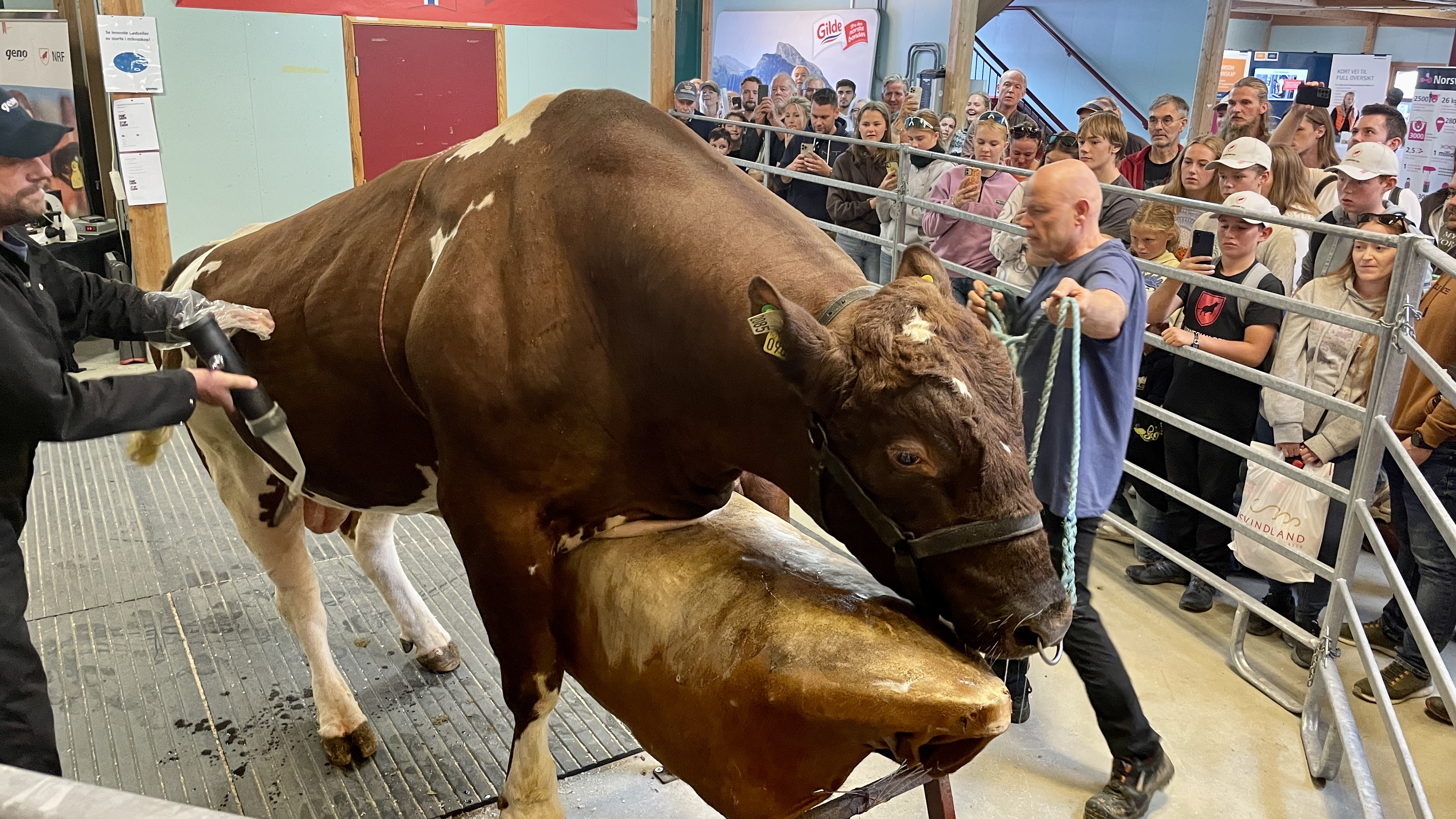
Bull at virtual fuck.

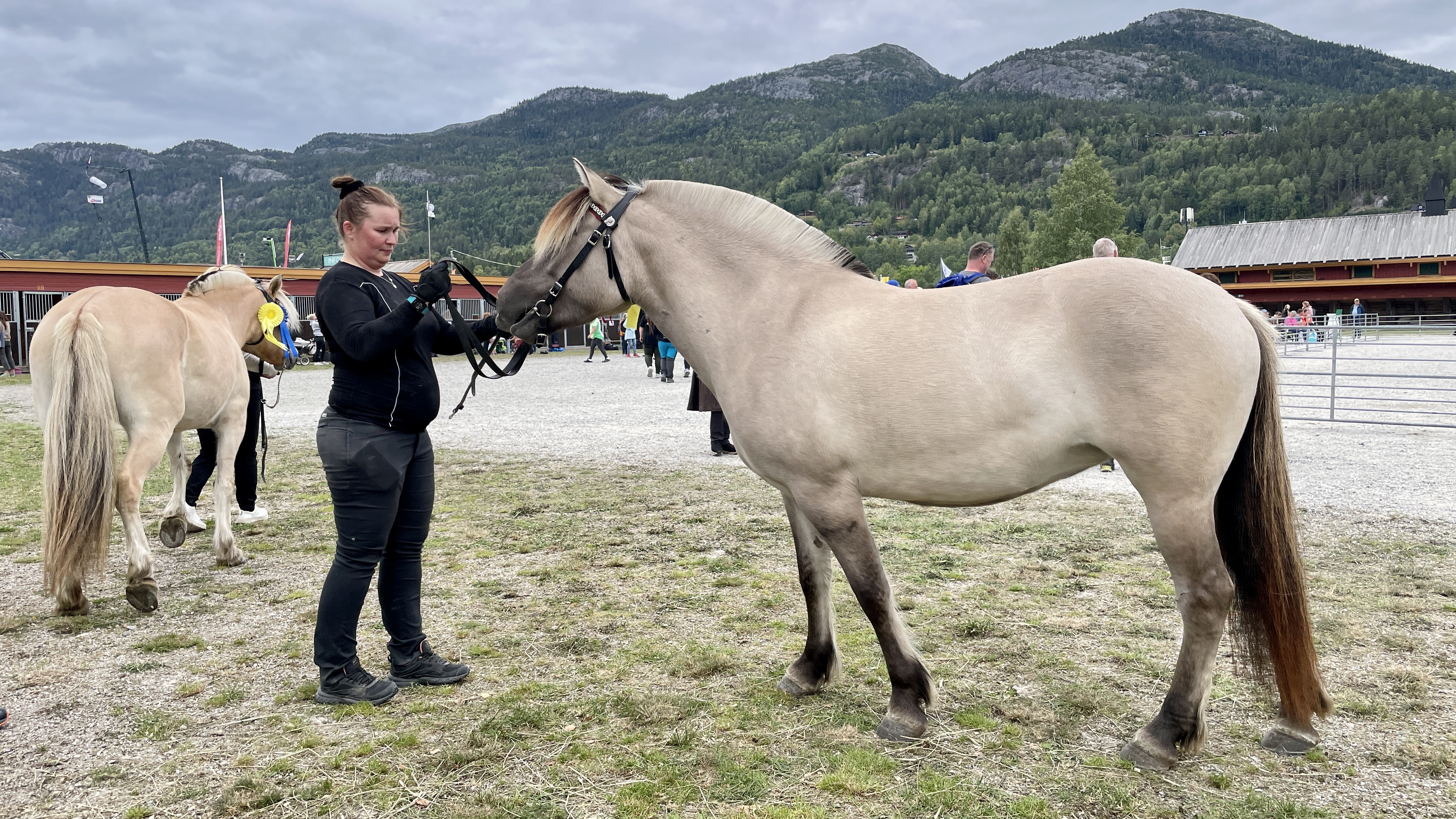
Beautiful Fjordhorses.

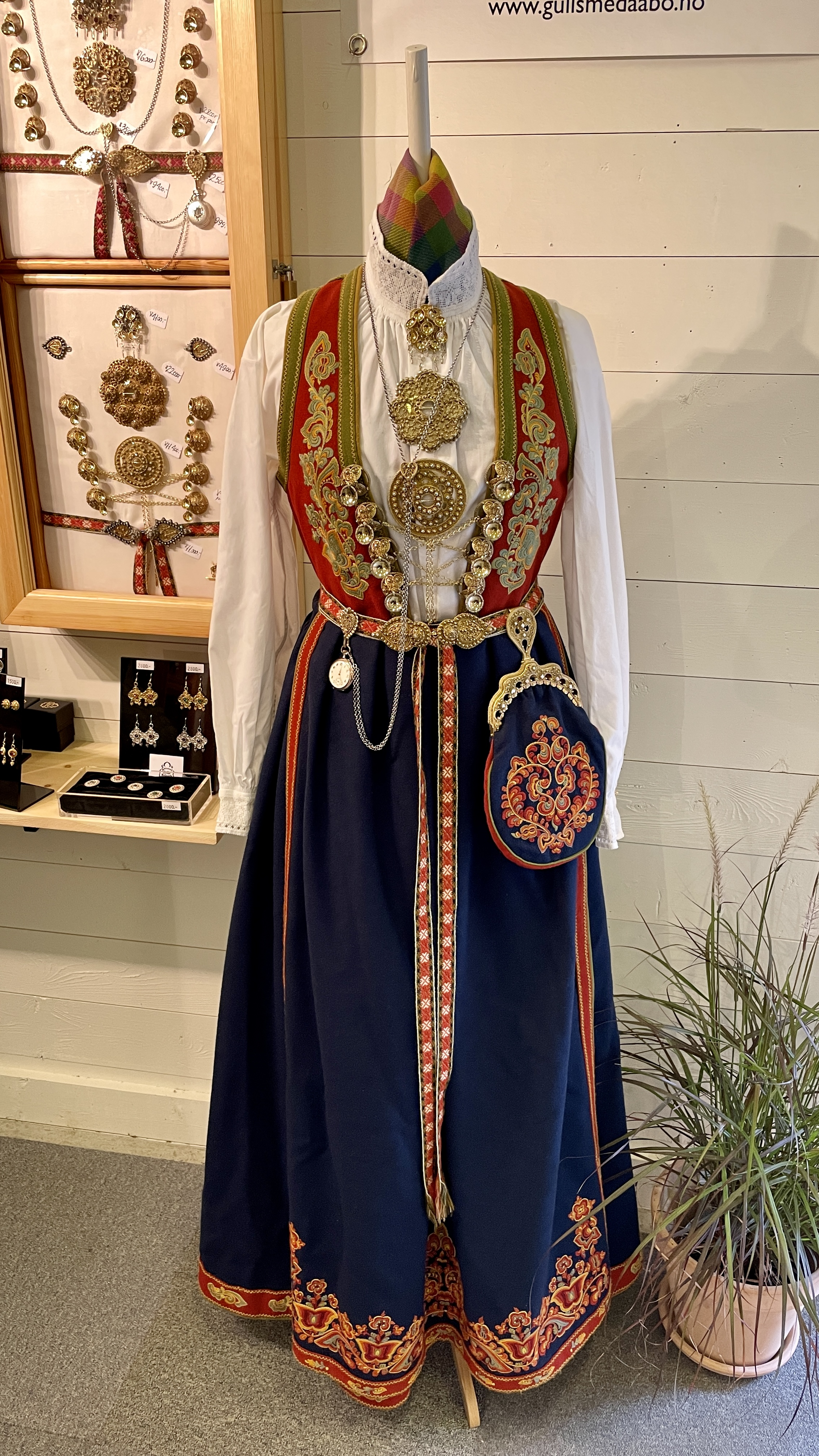
Traditional clothing.

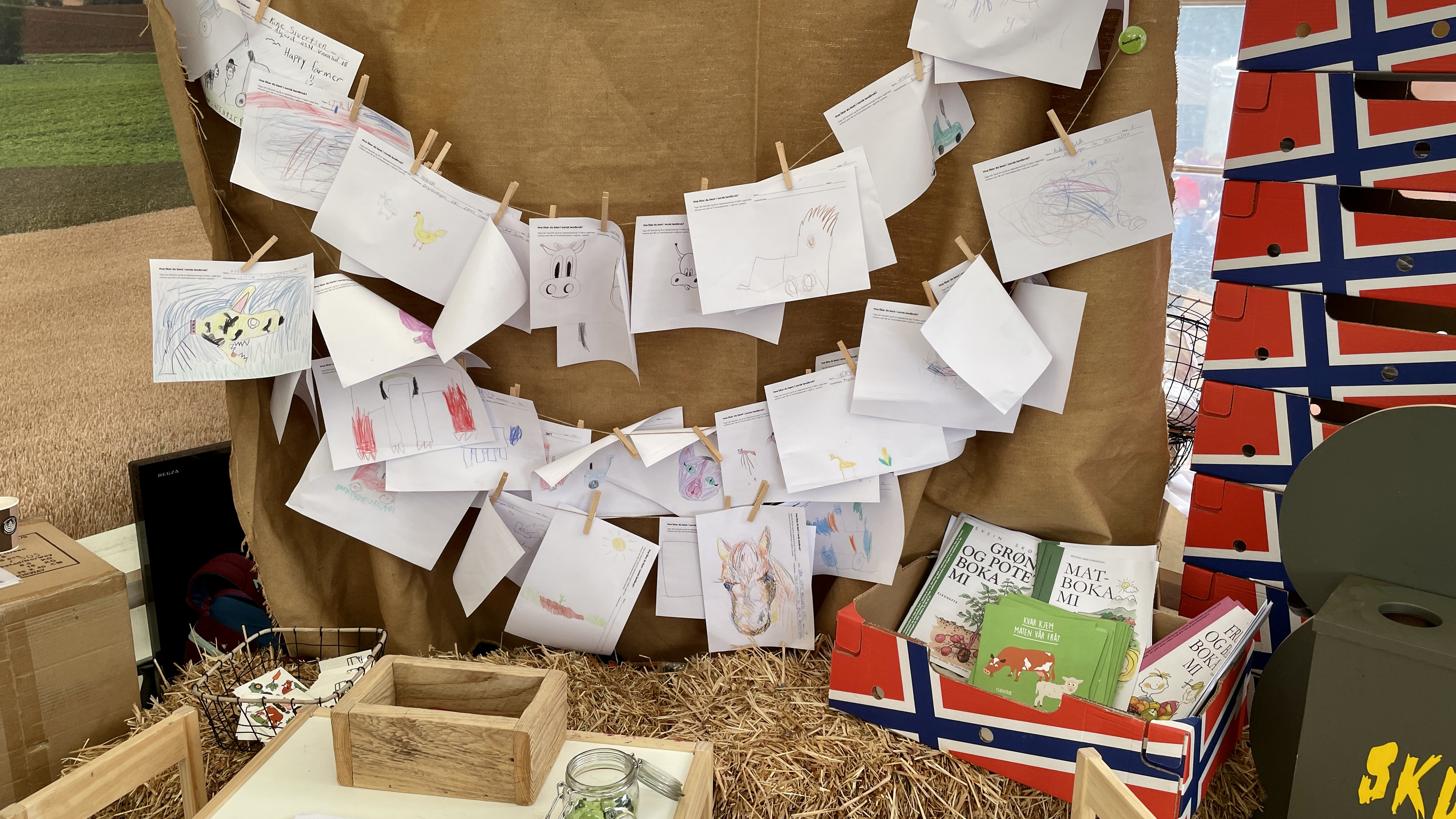
Kids paintings at the Norsk Bondelag tables.

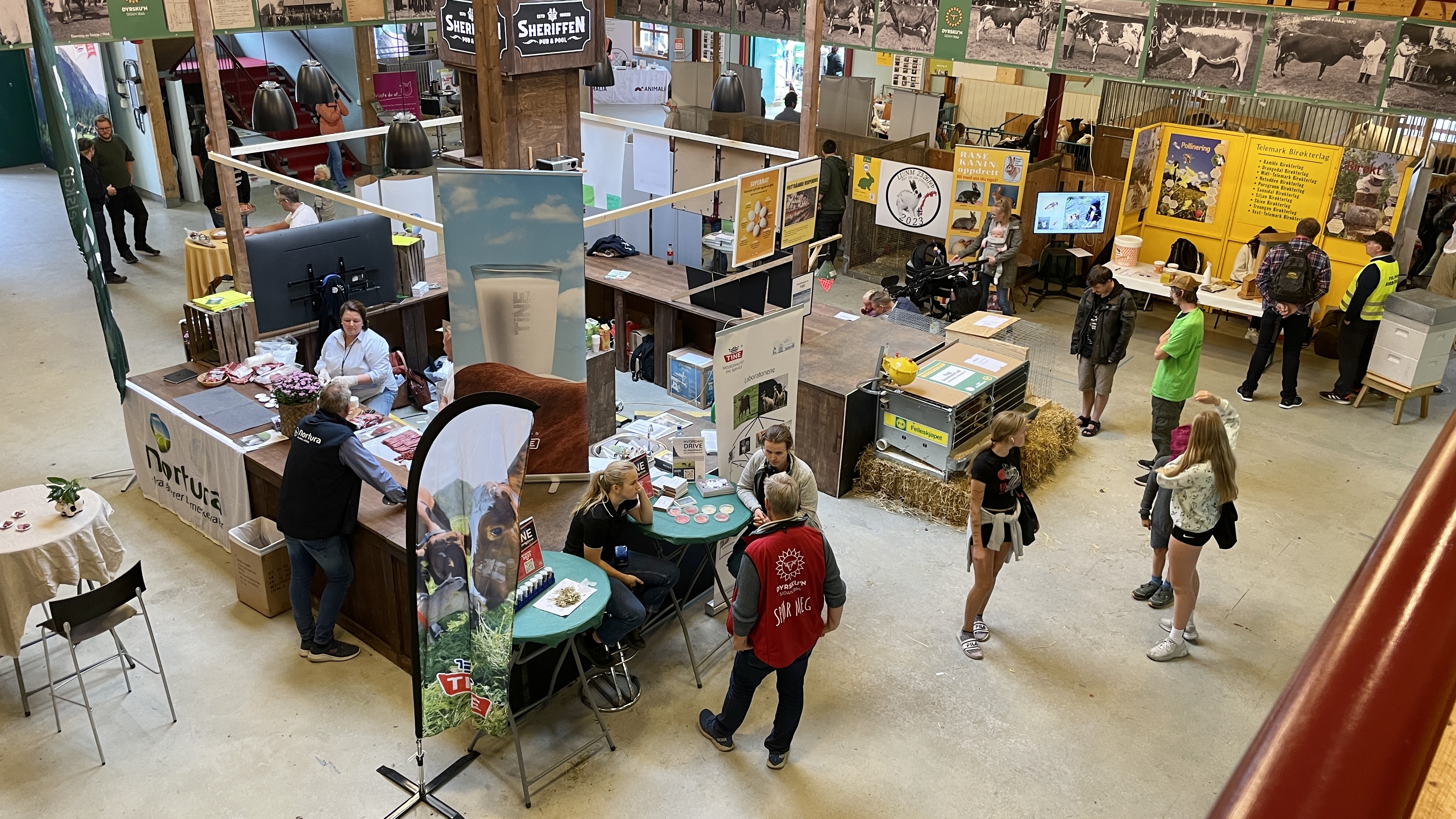
Overview of some animalstables and exhibitors.
