= Dølehest =

Breed of horse

Dole Gudbrandsdal
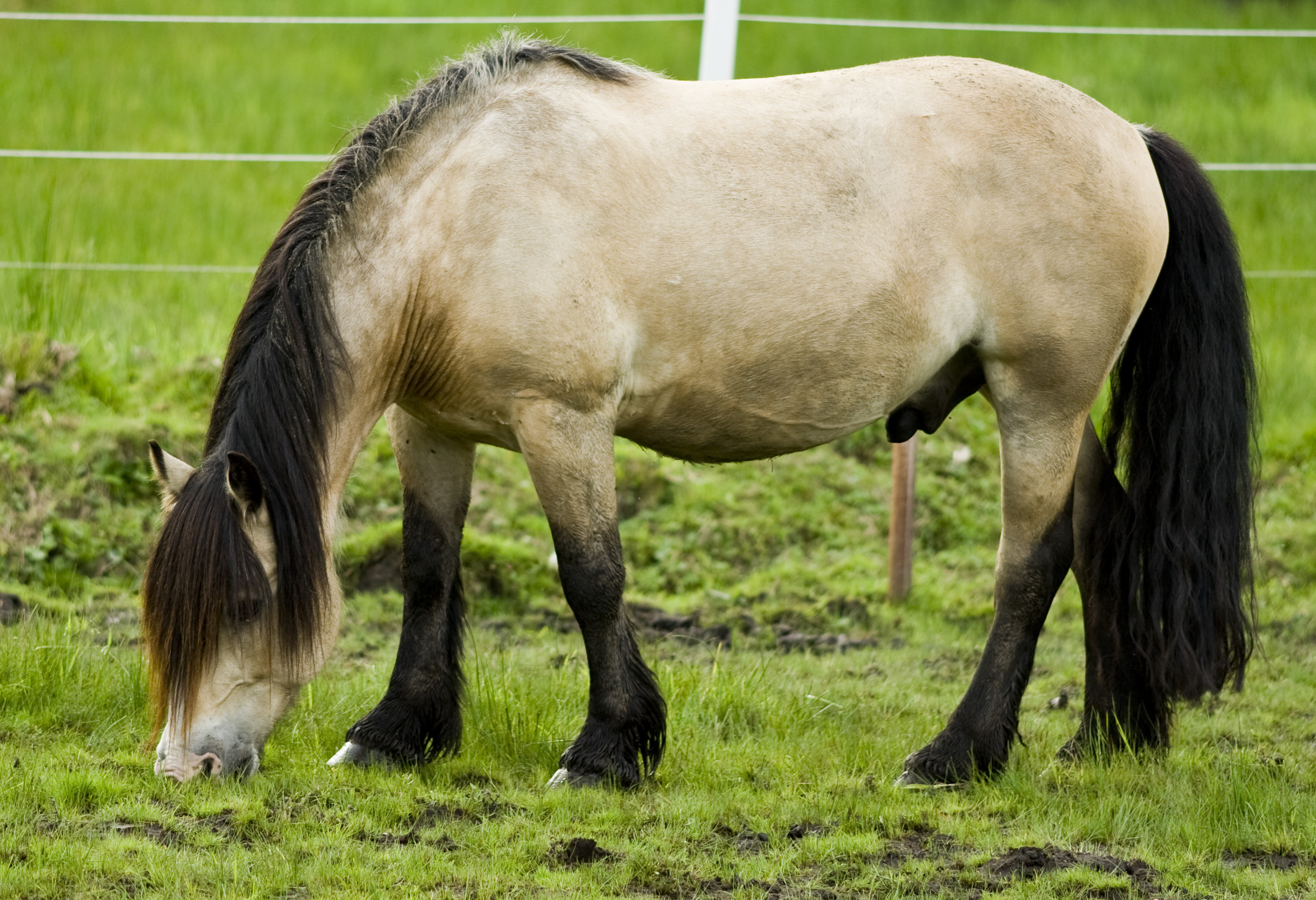
- Dølahorse eating grass
- Other names: Dølahest; Dole Trotter; Norwegian Trotter
- Country of origin: Norway

Traits
- Distinguishing features: Small draft breed, good trot, used for draft work and harness racing

Breed standards
- Landslaget for Dølehest

The Dole Gudbrandsdal, Dølahest, or Dole is a draft- and harness-type horse from Norway. The Dole Trotter is alternately considered a subtype of the Dole Gudbrandsdal and a separate breed; it is also considered a part of the coldblood trotter type. The Dole Gudbrandsdal is a small draft horse, known for its pulling power and agility, while the Dole Trotter is a smaller, faster horse used for harness racing. The two types were previously commonly interbred, but the studbooks have been separate since 2000 and since 2016 the criteria for entry into the Gudbrandsdal horse studbook has required a strict critique of eligible mares. The Dole is originally from the Gudbrandsdal Valley, and is probably descended in part from the Friesian horse. Over time, the breed has had Thoroughbred, Arabian, and other breeds added in, especially during the creation of the Dole Trotter in the 19th century. The first studbook was created in 1941, and the current breed association was formed in 1947. Although originally used mainly as a pack horse, today, the heavier Dole type is used mainly for agricultural purposes. The Dole Gudbrandsdal has been crossed with other breeds to develop horses for harness racing and riding.

== Breed characteristics ==
Dole horses generally stand at 14.1 to 15.3 hands (57 to 63 inches, 145 to 160 cm) high, weigh 1,190 to 1,390 pounds (540 to 630 kg), and are usually bay, black, or chestnut. Gray is present in the population, as is the cream gene, meaning palomino, buckskin and smoky black occurs. Double dilute individuals are considered undesirable in the stud book due to now-disproven associations with albinism. Double-dilute stallions are prohibited from breeding, whilst double-dilute mares are not certified at studbook inspections but their progeny may be registered in the studbook. The dun gene does not exist in the population. White markings may occur on the head and legs. The head is heavy with a straight profile, the neck rather short and muscular, the withers moderately pronounced and broad, the chest wide and deep, and the shoulder strong, muscular, and sloping. The back is long and the croup broad, muscular, and slightly sloping. The legs are short but sturdy and well muscled, with broad, solid joints and tough hooves. At one point in the breed's history, it was prone to weak legs and low fertility, but these problems have since been corrected. Dole horses closely resemble the British Fell and Dales ponies, which developed from the same ancestral stock.

When presented for grading and studbook inspection, the heavy-type Dole Gudbrandsdals are tested for pulling power and trotting. In the lighter type, X-rays showing the knee and lower legs to be free of defects must be presented. Trotting-type mares with proper conformation that are not fast enough during grading may be registered as draft-type Doles. These strict and organized standards have improved the quality of the Dole breed over the past few decades. Although the Dole horse is one of the smallest draft breeds, it shows great pulling power, and is also hardy and agile. They are especially known for their excellent trot, as is shown by the lighter subtype of the breed. During the late 20th century, interbreeding between the two types became quite common; due to this, the breed became much more uniform in type, with fewer differences between the trotter and draft sections.

== Breed history ==
The Dole is thought to have originated in the Gudbrandsdal, an inland valley in the county of Oppland. It is likely that the Dole is in part a descendant of the Friesian, as the two breeds are similar in conformation, and the Frisian people were known traders in the area between 400 and 800 AD. There was also equine movement between western Norway and northern England during the 9th century through the mid-11th century; this extended period of trade between these areas likely influenced the strong resemblance between the Dole, Friesian, Fell Pony and Dale Pony breeds.

Two stallions, Odin and Mazarin, had a large influence on the development of the Dole breed. Odin (son of Partisan), was a stallion of Thoroughbred (some sources say Norfolk Trotter) breeding, imported to Norway in 1834. Odin was said to cost £257 at the time and to have been bred to over 100 mares in his first four years in Norway. All Dole Trotter horses today contain Odin bloodlines. Mazarin was an Arabian imported to Norway in 1934. In 1849, another influential stallion was foaled, named Veikle Balder 4; he was a grandson of Odin and is considered the foundation stallion of the heavier Dole type. A stallion named Brimen 825 was used by breeders to maintain and improve some horses of the heavier Dole type for draft uses.

In the 19th century, harness racing began to rise in popularity in Norway and breeders looked to create a horse suitable for that sport. The Dole Trotter, a smaller, lighter, faster variation of the draft-type Dole Gudbrandsdal, was then developed. Infusions of Thoroughbred blood, as well as that of various trotting and heavy draft breeds, were used to create this new type. The Dole Trotter was especially influenced between 1840 and 1860 by two other stallions, Toftebrun and Dovre (an Arabian); the latter is the foundation stallion of the Dole Trotter type. The two types are commonly interbred, especially since 1960.

In 1872, the Dole Gudbrandsdal was split into two types, a class for heavier agriculture and driving horses and a class for lighter racing and riding horses. In 1875, the Norwegian Trotting Association was formed by enthusiasts of the second type. In 1902, the first Dole Gudbrandsdal studbook was published, containing stallions from both types born between 1846 and 1892. In 1903, the Norwegian Trotting Association split their registration between purebred Norwegian trotters and trotting crosses. At the same time, standards for entry were tightened and the first inspection committee was created. In 1965, the Norwegian or Dole Trotter studbook was taken over by the Norwegian Trotting Association, as part of the new coldblood trotter program approved by the Norwegian Ministry for Agriculture. The Dole Trotter studbook is still coordinated with the original Dole Gudbrandsdal registry, and horses have to meet many of the same standards. The Dole Trotter is alternately considered a subtype of the Dole Gudbrandsdal and a separate breed.

Interest in the Dole Gudbrandsdal continued through World War II, and the horses were used heavily during Norway's occupation by Germany. Breed numbers and interest diminished after the war, as increasing mechanization reduced demand for draft animals; however, a breeding center was established in 1962 to help maintain population numbers. In 1947, the National Dølehorse Association was formed to promote and preserve the breed. As of 2002, about 4,000 Dole Gudbrandsdals are registered, with around 175 new foals added annually.

== Uses ==
When originally developed, Dole Gudbrandsdals were used as pack horses on overland trade routes across Norway, the main one of which connected Oslo with the North Sea and ran through the Gudbrandsdal Valley. The Dole Gudbrandsdal is used mainly for heavy draft and agricultural work, as well as timber hauling, while the lighter Dole Trotter is used mainly for harness racing. The Dole Gudbrandsdal was an influential breed in the formation of the North Swedish Horse, and the two breeds are very similar in conformation. When the Dole and North Swedish breeds are crossed, they produce a lighter-weight horse with more forward gaits that is often used for harness racing. The Dole Gudbrandsdal has also been crossed with Swedish Warmbloods to produce riding-type horses, and Dole/Thoroughbred crosses may produce nice hunter horses.
