= Telemarkfe =

Breed of cattle

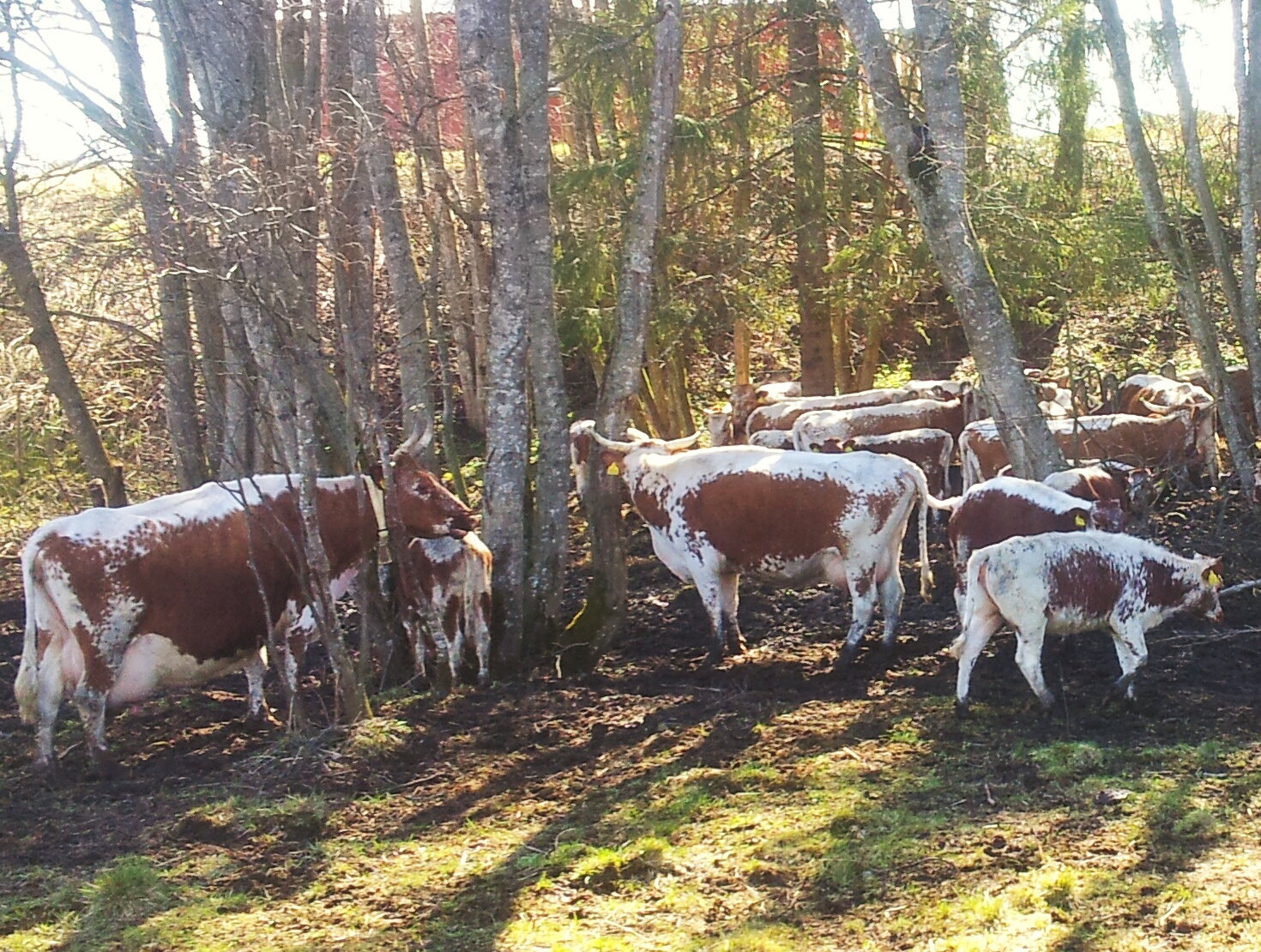
- Conservation status: FAO (2007): endangered-maintained; DAD-IS (2024): endangered-maintained
- Other names: Telemark; Telemark Cattle
- Country of origin: Norway
- Distribution: southern Norway
- Standard: Landslaget for Telemarkfe (in Norwegian)
- Use: dairy

Traits
- Weight: Male: 700 kg; Female: 500 kg
- Height: Male: 140 cm; Female: 121 cm
- Coat: colour-sided red with white finching
- Horn status: usually horned in both sexes
- Cattle; Bos (primigenius) taurus

The Telemarkfe or Telemark is a traditional Norwegian breed of dairy cattle. It originated in, and is named for, the county of Telemark in central southern Norway. In the second half of the nineteenth century it spread – with official encouragement – to most of the eastern and southern part of the country. In the twenty-first century it is an endangered breed, with a total population of fewer than 600 head.

== History ==
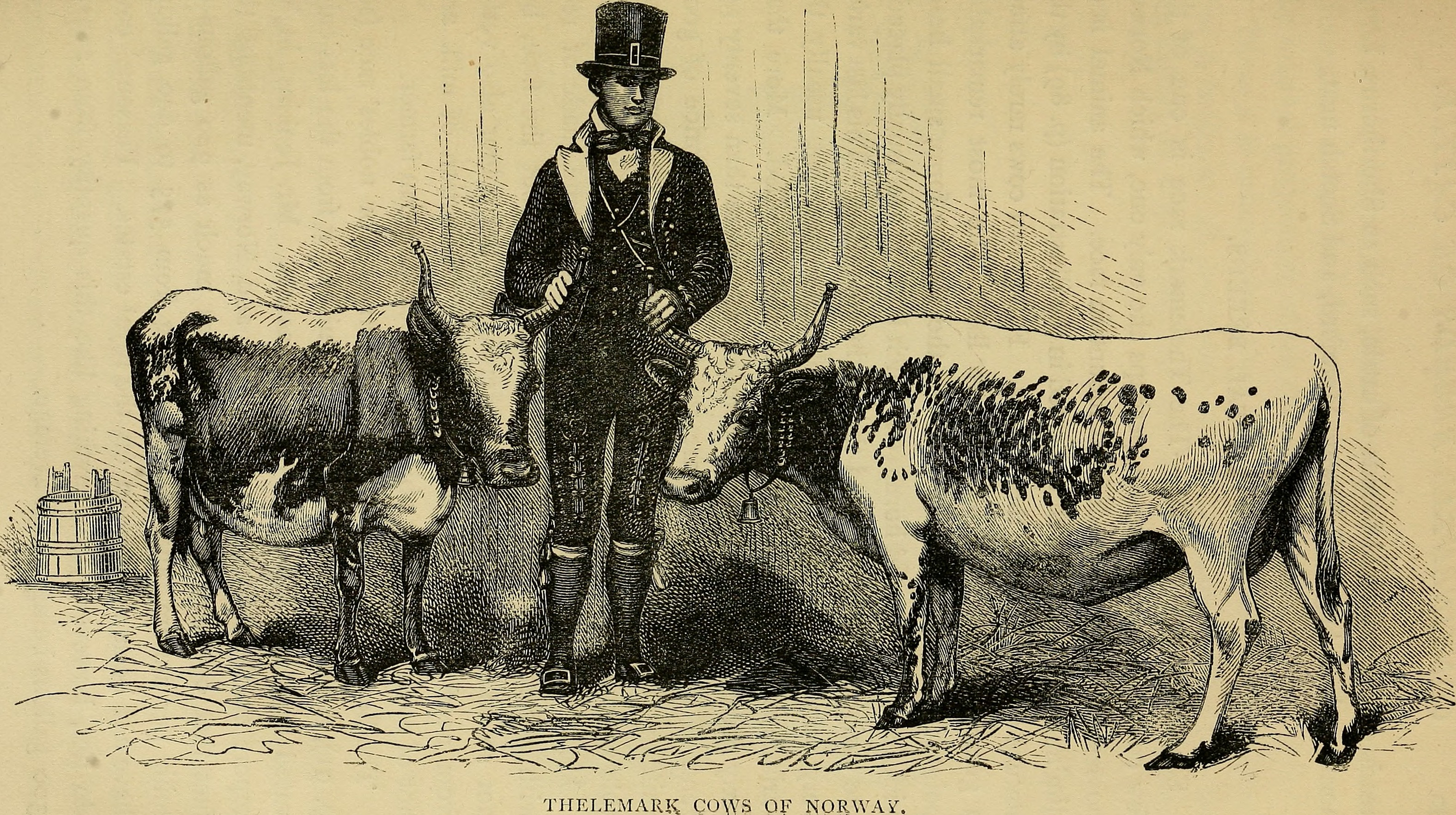
Engraving from 1877

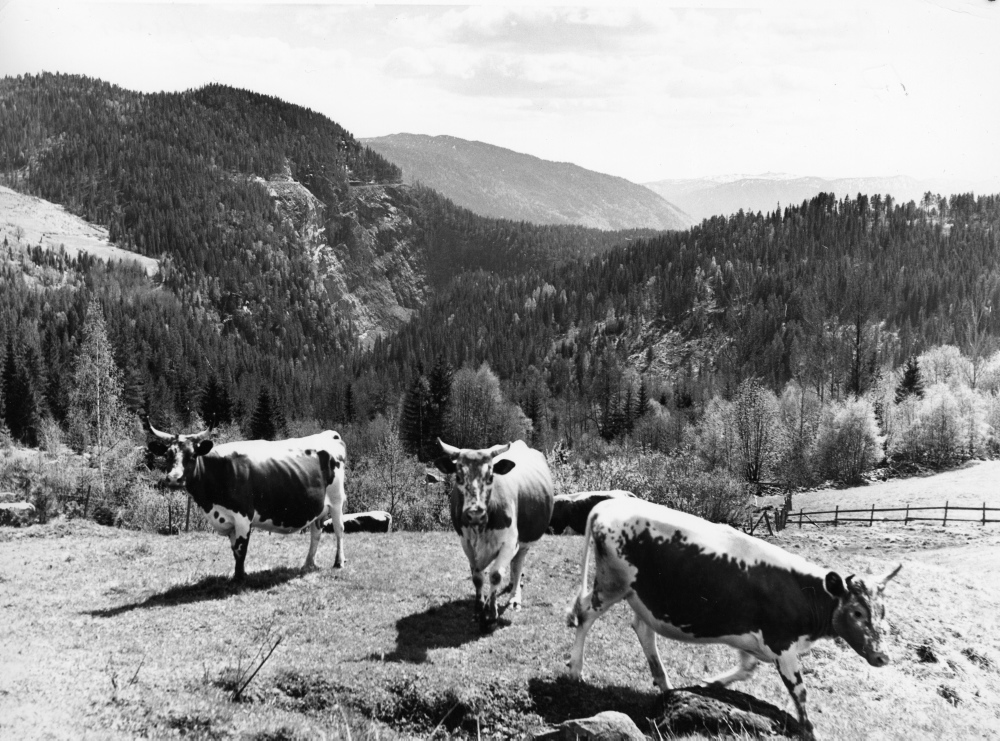
In Nesland, 1958

The Telemarkfe is a traditional population of dairy cattle of the county of Telemark in central southern Norway. It was first characterised as a breed in 1856, when it was the subject of a cattle show organised in Kviteseid by Johan Lindeqvist, a Swede who had been appointed state agronomist for Norway. The cattle were shown again at the first national agricultural show in Seljord in 1866 – an event that developed into the annual Dyrsku'n.

Lindeqvist had found that the Telemarkfe grazed well in fjord, forest and mountain areas and provided a good quantity of milk; he believed that it could be used to improve mountain cattle in other parts of the country. During the second half of the nineteenth century it spread – partly as a result of official encouragement – beyond the confines of Telemark and Oppland counties to most of eastern and southern Norway. A breed society was established in 1895 and a herd-book was started in 1926. A breeding station was set up in 1946 in Bø Municipality in Midt-Telemark, where artificial insemination of cows was available. Other breeding centres were established in several areas, among them: Hallingdal in the county of Buskerud; Hardanger and Voss in Hordaland, now part of Vestland county; and Tynset in Hedmark and Valdres in Oppland, now both in Innlandet county.

The driving force behind the work was the state agronomist Johan Lindeqvist, originally from Sweden. After the war, Norwegian red cattle were introduced into Norway. Traditional cow breeds then suffered a major drop off in numbers. In the 1980s, there were steps put into place to protect rare breeds. In 2006, there were 400 animals of this breed in Norway.

Bull semen is conserved for over fifty bulls; semen collected from four new bulls is added to the reserve each year.

== Characteristics ==
Telemark cattle are red, with a white colour on the back in the shape of a cross. Sometimes, cows are also white on the underside. The face is usually mixed in colour. Most Telemark cattle have horns. The Telemark is primarily a milking breed, and does not grow very large. Animals do not usually weigh more than 500 kilograms (1,100 lb).
