= Johannes Østtveit =

Norwegian politician

Johannes Østtveit (18 January 1927 – 9 July 2013) was a Norwegian politician for the Christian Democratic Party. He was born in Sauherad Municipality. He was elected to the Norwegian Parliament from Telemark in 1965, and was re-elected on one occasion. Østtveit was involved in local politics in Bø Municipality between 1959 and 1975.
