= Olav Søyland =

Norwegian politician

Olav Søyland (26 July 1921 – 9 April 2001) was a Norwegian politician for the Christian Democratic Party.

He served as a deputy representative to the Parliament of Norway from Telemark during the terms 1965–1969 and 1969–1973. In total he met during 73 days of parliamentary session. He hailed from Porsgrunn.
