= Järvsöfaks =

Swedish trotter

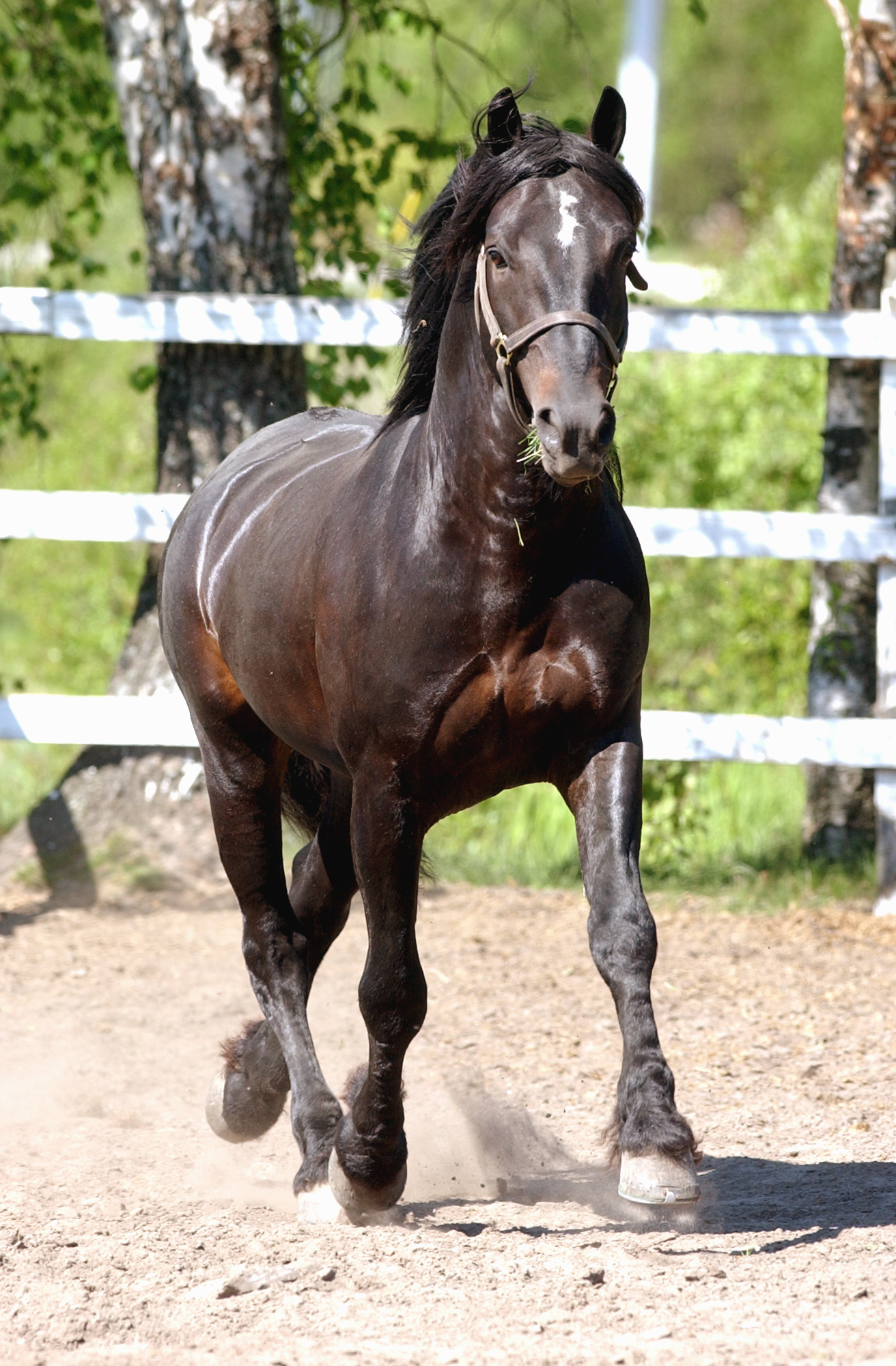
- Sire: Trollfaks
- Dam: Järvsö Anna
- Damsire: Stravinsky
- Sex: Stallion
- Foaled: 23 June 1994
- Died: 19 October 2020 (aged 26)
- Country: Sweden
- Colour: Brown
- Breeder: Jan-Olov Persson
- Owner: Jan-Olov Persson
- Trainer: Jan-Olov Persson
- Record: car: 1:17.9 handicap: 1:20.5
- Earnings: SEK 21,288,570

Järvsöfaks (23 June 1994 – 19 October 2020) was a Swedish trotter. He held the current coldblood trotter's world record in wins, consecutive wins (42), and the coldblood trotter world record time, 1:17.9 per kilometre. His bloodlines included both Swedish and Norwegian coldblood trotters.

Järvsöfaks was driven and trained by Jan-Olov Persson. He was an award-winning sire in Sweden, and some of his offspring have winnings of millions of Swedish kronor.

== Biography ==
Järvsöfaks was foaled on 23 June 1994, out of Järvsö Anna and by Trollfaks. He has been bred, owned, trained and driven, almost exclusively, by Persson.

His trotting career started at age 3 in 1997, and ended at age 15 in 2009. With the win in his last race on 28 December 2009, he totally won 201 out of 234 races. During his career he earned 21,288,570 Swedish kronor in prize money.

In 2004, Järvsöfaks came down with the rare condition called the Baron Gruff disease. The disease starts abruptly and develops quickly, but Järvsöfaks had treatment quickly enough and recovered. He returned to competition at the end of the same year.

After this, Järvsöfaks was given a position of honour in the Royal Guards and in the Life Guards. In 2005, editor Robert Opku wrote a book about the stallion in co-operation with Persson. The book was finished a couple of days after Järvsöfaks broke the world record in the Gävletravet race on 12 July 2005, with his time 1:17.9 per kilometre. The previous world record, 1:18.6, had been held by the Norwegian Spikeld.

Järvsöfaks received the Horse of the Year award in Sweden three times in a row from 2003 to 2005. He was also given the title of the Coldblood of the Year twelve times 1998-2009.

From 2000 to 2013 Järvsöfaks served in breeding. He had sired 874 foals in Sweden. Some of his offspring are Hallsta Lotus, Åkre Lurifax, Faksen Jr. and Fakse, all of which have won for their sire in racing. However, when Järvsöfaks won his 10th Swedish Championship at age 15, he beat five of his sons, including Hallsta Lotus, Åkre Lurifax and Fakse.

Järvsöfaks died on 19 October 2020 in Hudiksvall, Sweden, aged 26.

== Record ==
On 5 December 2008, Järvsöfaks met Sabin's Swedish record and on 26 December he broke Alm Svarten's world record in wins with his 184th heat on the Bergsåker race track.

== Accomplishments ==
- Triple Horse of the Year in Sweden (Årets häst) in 2003, 2004 and 2005
- Coldblood of the Year in Sweden (Årets kallblod) twelve times 1998-2009
- World record for coldblood trotters in consecutive wins (42)
- World record in wins (201) for coldblood trotters, though three finnhorses have more wins: Reipas 348 during the 1950s and '60s, Vonkaus 317, and Topas 284
- World record for coldblood trotters in short (1:17.9) and mid-length distances
- Won 88% of his heats (234: 201-16-4)
- Won the Elitkampen race in 2002-2006, and has won 10 Swedish Championships, 5 international matches, the Norskt Derby race, and the Tapiolan Erkon Pokaali race thrice (last in 2007).

== Pedigree ==
Pedigree of Järvsöfaks
Sire Trollfaks	Troll Jahn	Jahn Sjur	Steggbest
Sire Trollfaks	Troll Jahn	Jahn Sjur	Ljönna
Sire Trollfaks	Troll Jahn	Grans Turi	Granvar
Sire Trollfaks	Troll Jahn	Grans Turi	Grans Erna
Sire Trollfaks	Reitlisa	Lapp Lars	Årnseth Rauen
Sire Trollfaks	Reitlisa	Lapp Lars	Lappe Lisa
Sire Trollfaks	Reitlisa	Reitmolly	Molyn
Sire Trollfaks	Reitlisa	Reitmolly	Reitterna
Dam Järvsö Anna	Lapp Nils	Lapp Lasse	Junius
Dam Järvsö Anna	Lapp Nils	Lapp Lasse	Solbalett
Dam Järvsö Anna	Lapp Nils	Turita	Pavin
Dam Järvsö Anna	Lapp Nils	Turita	Ceirita
Dam Järvsö Anna	Vinjänta	Svintor	Bestmin
Dam Järvsö Anna	Vinjänta	Svintor	Vinta
Dam Järvsö Anna	Vinjänta	Steggjänta	Steggbest
Dam Järvsö Anna	Vinjänta	Steggjänta	Jäntungen
