= Brillant 755 =

Percheron horse

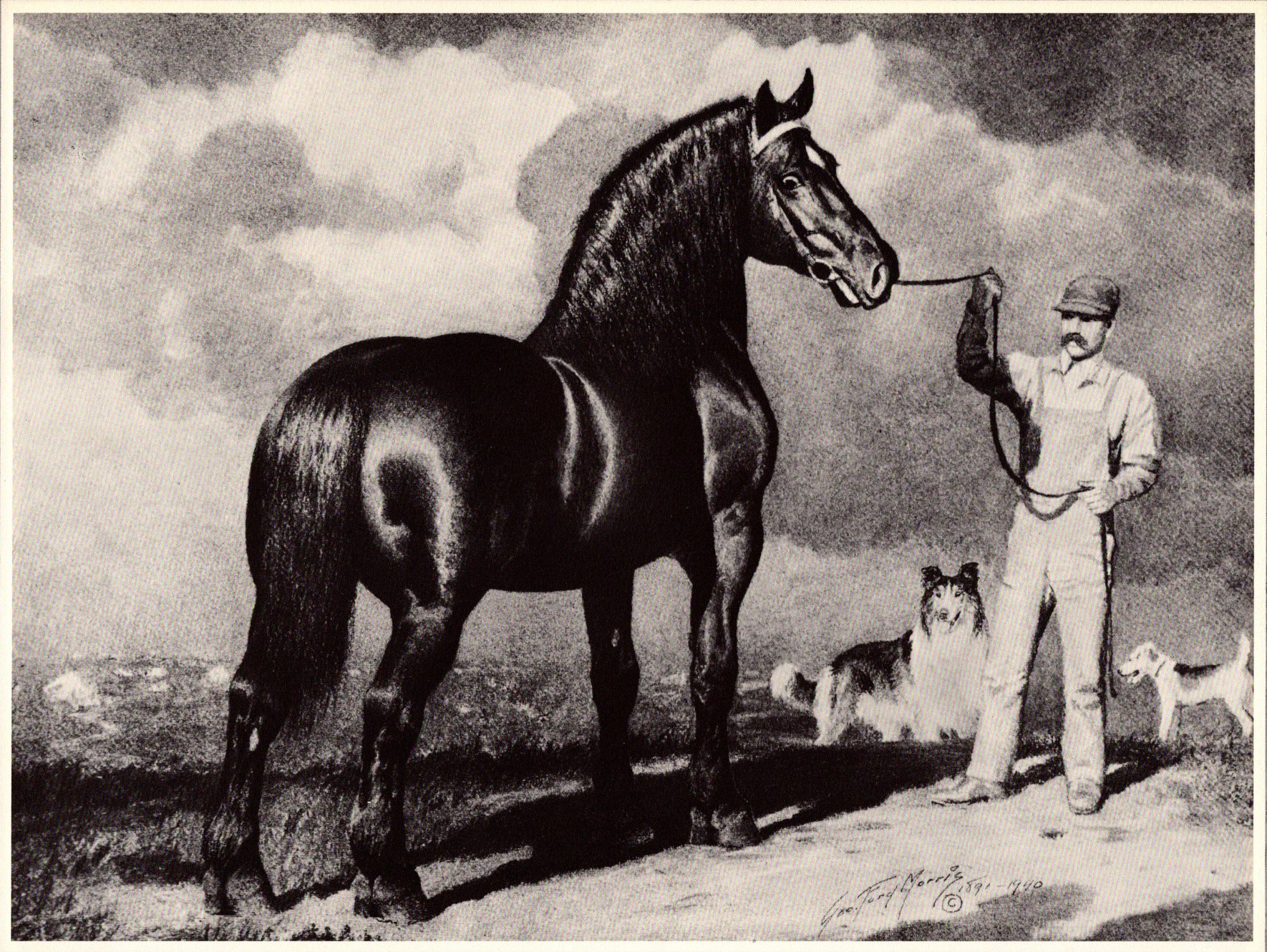
Brillant depicted by artist Morris, 1891

Brillant 755 (born 1876), also known as Brilliant, is the most famous stallion of the Percheron breed of the 19th century. This large, powerful draft horse with a black coat was born in the Perche region of France. It initially belonged to Ernest Perriot, breeder at La Chenelière in Nogent-le-Rotrou. The horse was sold to American breeder Mark Wentworth Dunham and exported to the USA in 1881, becoming the primary sire of Oaklawn Farm in Illinois. The horse exerted a major influence on Percheron breeding in the United States. Most of its offspring, including Voltaire 443, were show winners in France and the USA. This makes Brillant a highly sought-after ancestor for breeders.

Dunham commissioned numerous works depicting his horse, including a portrait by French artist Rosa Bonheur, of whom he was a great admirer. Brillant is also depicted in a work by American artist Frank Whitney, entitled The Thunder Storm.

== Registry identifier ==
Percherons have numbers appended to their names, depending on their stud book of registration. In the French Stud-Book, the first number provided (here, 755) is that of their registration in the French Stud-Book; the second, always indicated in brackets in these registers, is the order number of the American Percheron Stud-Book, published in Chicago by James Harvey Sanders.

Brillant is "Brillant 755" in the French records, but he is also listed as "Briolant 755" in some identification documents, notably in the pedigree of one of his sons, the stallion Voltaire 443. In the stud book of the Percheron Horse Association of America in the USA, he is identified as "Brilliant 1271 (755)".

== History ==
Brilliant 755's popularity is attested to by various authors. In 1910, French veterinary surgeon Alfred Gallier named him one of the most outstanding Percheron stallions. American journalists and breeders Alvin Howard Sanders and Wayne Dinsmore cited him in 1917 as the greatest Percheron improvement stallion in the United States, and the best Percheron stallion ever to have existed. Based on the first volume of the Percheron Stud-Book published in 1883 and the archives of the Illinois Agricultural Society, Brillant was born in 1876 in Eure-et-Loir, to breeder Ernest Perriot. (Note: Alfred Gallier places his birth with M. Aveline, in La Poignière (near La Ferté), see, but this is the only source to give this information. Gallier also confuses Brillant 755 with Brillant 756.) He was initially owned by his breeder, residing at La Chenelière, in Nogent-le-Rotrou. Ernest Perriot bred many other famous Percherons, with Sanders and Dinsmore also crediting him with the birth of Brillant 755's own sire, named Brillant 756. Ernest Perriot bred all five sires of famous Percheron bloodlines, making him the breeder who has exerted a greater influence on the Percheron breed since 1880 than any other breeder in France or America.

Brillant 755 was imported by Mark Wentworth Dunham in 1881, to his stud in Illinois. He was then 4 years old. According to Canadian agricultural professor Grant MacEwan, this makes 1881 an important year for horse breeding in the United States, firstly for the importance Brillant would later assume, and secondly because the vast majority of Percherons imported to the U.S. were imported by Dunham.

This arrival was discreet, but the young stallion was considered so favorably for his type and character that Mr. Dunham immediately put him into breeding service, along with Success 452 and Vidocq 483, two other stallions of great value. value. Convinced he had a sire of incalculable value , he had his stallion Duc du Perche replaced by Brillant 755 as Oaklawn Farm's main sire, which made him the most important breeder percheron in the United States from 1882. That same year, 30 of his French-born foals were imported to Oaklawn Farm.

For the next fifteen years, he was the central sire of the world's largest horse breeding stud farm of his day.

== Description ==
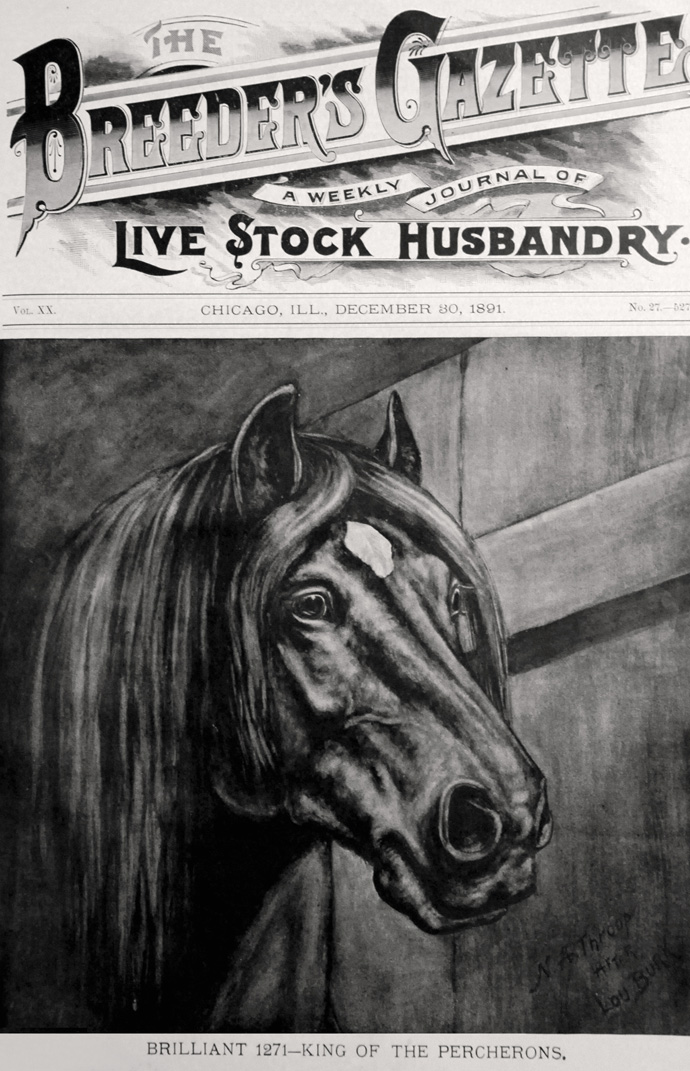
Brillant drawn by Lou Burk, on the cover of the Breeder's Gazette of 30 December 1891, described as king of the Percherons

The first known detailed description of "Brilliant 1271" appears in the Oaklawn Farm catalog published in 1882, when he was 4 years old. His weight is estimated at 1850 lbs (approx. 840 kg), and his height at 16 hands (162 cm). According to Dugast, Brillant 755 finally measures around 1.75 m, for a weight of 900 kg, once his growth is complete. Later descriptions put his weight at over a ton, but on the basis of testimonials gathered by Sanders and Dinsmore, his form weight was more likely to be around 1900 lbs (861 kg).

He has a lot of bone, and a compact model. Its head is slightly convex (Roman profile), and wide between the two eyes, endowed with ears fine. The throat is of medium size. His encolure is rather short. His shoulders are very sloping, and remarkably deep; his chest is very broad. His body is both long and very round. His quarters are broad, and exceptionally long. His legs are relatively short, and unusually wide thanks to their strong bone structure. Brillant is a black coal color. He is renowned for his great vigor, energetic manner. Sanders and Dinsmore emphasize the impressive aspect of this horse, described in turn as dominant, vigorous and supermasculine, exuding an outward impression of power.

== Origins ==
Brillant 755 is a son of the Percheron stallion Brillant 756, and the Percheron mare Ragoût. His sire Brillant 756 (named Brillant 1899 in the USA) was born in 1867 to Ernest Perriot, who used him intensively as a breeding Stallion until 1881. Brillant 755 (Brilliant 1271) was his best son. This stallion was then exported to the United States by Leonard Johnson in 1881, where he bred very little with purebred mares. Nevertheless, he gained an excellent reputation among American breeders, as his foals (including Brillant 755) all sold at high prices. Morphologically, he has a broad, deep chest.

Brillant 755's dam is called Ragoût, and is a daughter of the stallion Favori I owned by M. Perriot (father of Ernest Perriot), himself by Vieux-Chaslain.

His grandmother's name is Aline, and she is a daughter of the stallion Coco 712.

== Descendants ==
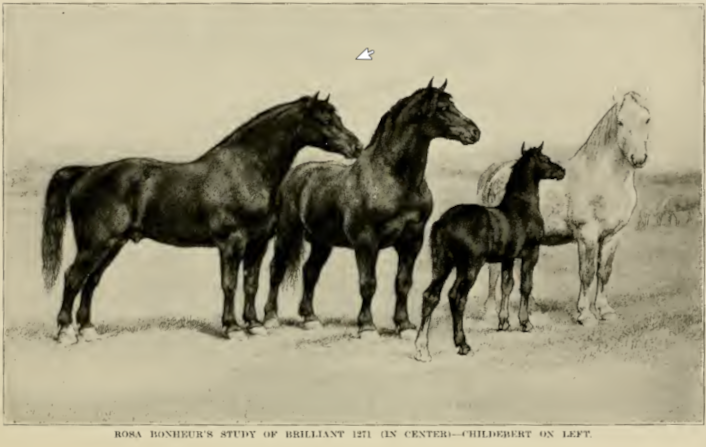
Study of Brillant 755 with stallion Childeric, brood mare and foal, by Rosa Bonheur

Brillant 755 sired his four best sons in France: Fénelon 2682 (38) and Voltaire 3540 (443), born in 1880 when Brillant was breeding at a very young age; then Gilbert 5154 (461) and Briard 5317, born in 1882. He is also the sire of Confident 3647 (397).

Leonard Johnson, horse buyer for Dunham, had the opportunity to evaluate the quality of his foals. Brillant 755 is the foundation of much American Percheron breeding, as many of his daughters and granddaughters were crossed with descendants of Brillant 756 (1899), his own sire. American show events of the 1880s and 1890s are thus dominated by the Brillant line. According to Sanders and Dinsmore, the most influential horses on American show rings at this time were Brilliant III (11116), Seducteur 8850 and Marathon 11410, all three sons of Brillant 755 out of daughters of Brillant 756. This quickly led American breeders to place a very high value on the presence of "Brilliant" in a pedigree. Two Brillant descendants, among the 11 winning stallions, won prizes at the Chicago International Live Stock show.

The same phenomenon was observed in France, where his son Voltaire won first prize in the Société Hippique Percheronne (SHP) competition in 1884; moreover, nine of the winning horses awarded by the SHP between 1901 and 1908 were descended from Brillant 755 or Brillant 756.

== Representations in the arts ==
Mark W. Dunham also commissioned artist Frank Whitney to create a work featuring Brilliant around foals, entitled The Thunder Storm, which was published in the Oaklawn Farm catalog in 1893. According to Dugast (citing Sanders and Dinsmore. ·.

On 10 December 1885, painter-draftsman Cecil Palmer produced his very first drawing for the Breeder's Gazette, featuring Brilliant with a group of foals and a mare.

== See also ==
- Percheron
- Prince Chaldean
