= Prince Chaldean =

Percheron gray stallion

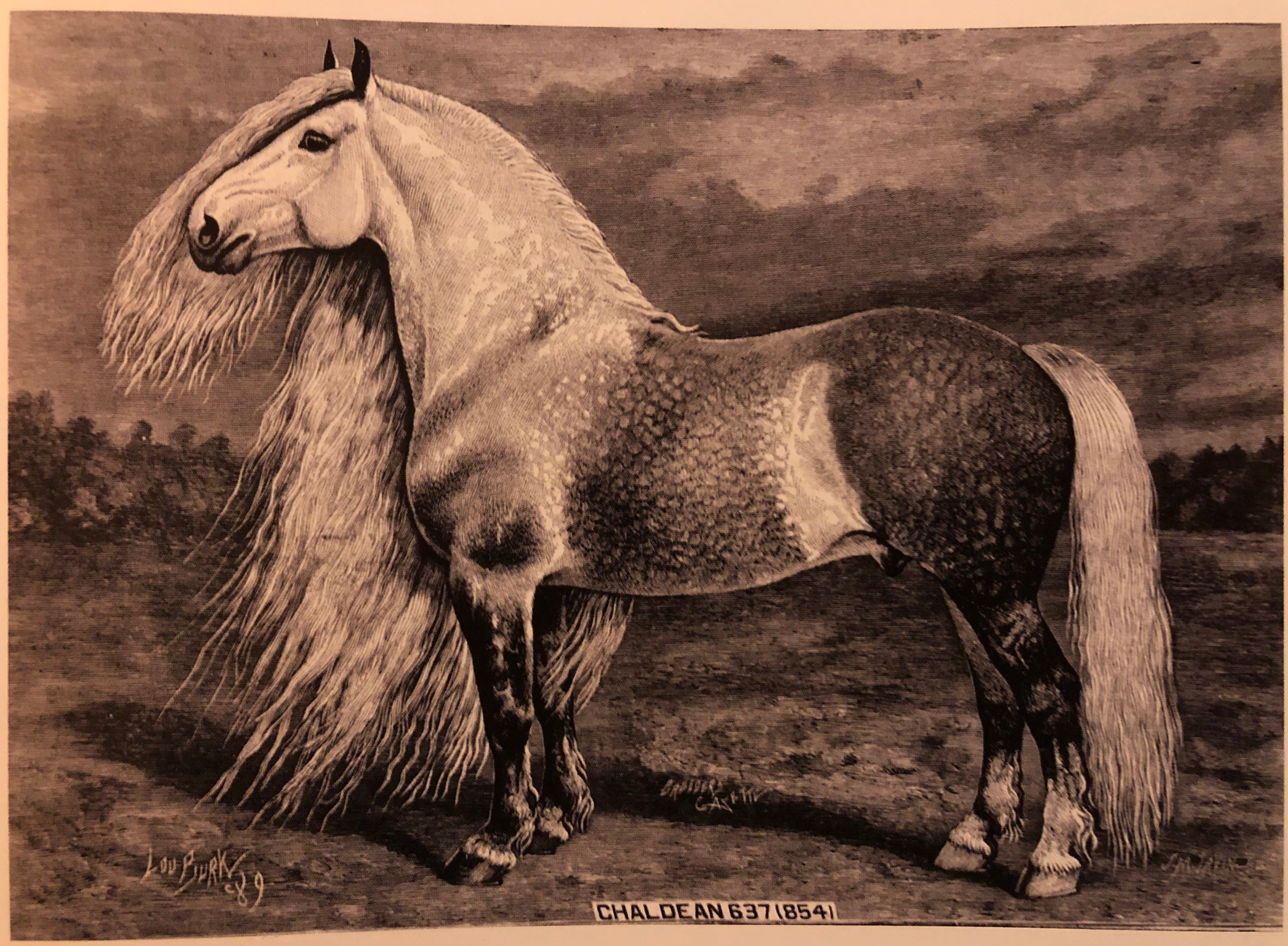
- Breed: Percheron
- Sire: Coco
- Dam: Superior 730
- Foaled: 1877; France
- Color: Gray

Prince Chaldean (also known as Chaldean 854 and Chaldean 637) was a gray Percheron stallion, known for his very long, abundant mane. Born in the Perche region of France in 1877, he was exported as a youngster to the United States, where he was briefly owned by Mark Wentworth Dunham, who sold him a few months later to Mr. Babcock in Wisconsin. Chaldean became a popular local breeding stallion.

He earned his nickname "Prince Chaldean" when he toured with the Ringling Brothers Circus from 1892 onwards. He was presented as the most beautiful and heaviest Percheron horse ever to arrive in the United States. One of his daughters, the mare Isis 1744, is the dam of three famous stallions, Primus 5705, Horus 6491, and Ilderim 10356.

== History ==
Chaldean was born in 1877 in the department of Eure-et-Loir, France. He was imported as a young foal by the famous horse owner and breeder Mark Wentworth Dunham, to his stud in the town of Wayne, Illinois in the USA, the same year. His coat color was black.

In February 1878, it was acquired by a man named H. A. Babcock (according to the U.S. Register and the Breeder's Gazette), residing in Neenah, Wisconsin. However, author Jean-Léo Dugast attributes the name Geo Babcock to its owner, specifying that he resides in Appleton. Chaldean was bred from the age of 43. Babcock testified that his horse had "never been beaten in a show ring". By 1890, while still owned by Babcock, Chaldean's coat color had changed to gray.

== Circus career ==
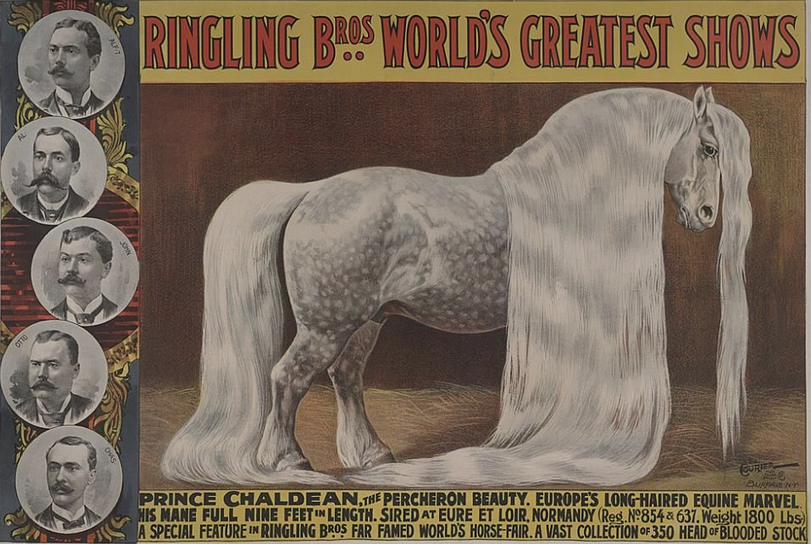
Prince Chaldean on a Ringling Brothers circus poster

The stallion first took part in Ringling Brothers circus shows in 1892, which presented him as the heaviest and most handsome Percheron ever exported to the USA, under the name "Prince Chaldean, The Percheron Beauty ". Contextualizing all shows involving physically challenged circus animals, including the Ringling Brothers circus, skeptical investigator Joe Nickell notes that these animals were often integrated into sideshows (entresorts), shows presented separately from the main tent, based on capturing the audience's interest through bon mots. Numerous animals with physical peculiarities, including horses, were exhibited in the great American circus shows of the period.

Prince Chaldean, for example, was exhibited in Wisconsin in 1892. For the occasion, the Ringling Brothers circus distributed press releases to the local American press, promoting the horse's appearance; at the same time, it distributed another press release promoting "the biggest hippopotamus in the world".

== Description ==
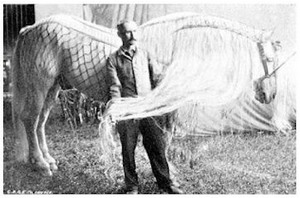
Photograph of Prince Chaldean at the Ringling Brothers Circus in 1894

Chaldean was a Percheron stallion best known for his very long, abundant mane. It reached a length of over 2.20 m (7 feet 4 inches) in 1890, according to its second owner Babcock. This feature was described in the Breeder's Gazette as "out of the ordinary". His mane was measured at 9 feet and two inches (2 meters and 80 centimeters) two years later, in 1892, his tail being the same length. His weight exceeded 1,800 pounds (810 kg) in 1892.

He is registered as a black-coated horse in the Stud-book percheron de France, but the Breeder's Gazette and author Jean-Léo Dugast report, based on the study of iconographic documents, that he was more likely gray, his color having gradually changed after his birth.

== Origins ==
There is disagreement about Chaldean's origins. The French Studbook (1883), the American Percheron Studbook (1888) and the Breeder's Gazette of 1890 all report him as the son of a stallion named Coco, himself a son of Coco II 714. This makes Chaldean a grandson of Coco II 714. Author Jean-Léo Dugast states that his sire was the stallion Coco II 714.

His dam is a daughter of Superior 730.

The Ringling brothers described him as a "noble" animal with an "impeccable pedigree".

(Prince Chaldean °1877)

Favori I °1862	Pauline	Coco 712 °1841	Poule	Vieux-Pierre 883 °1849	Vieux Chaslain °1847	L'Amie	Vieux Chaslain °1847
Coco II 714 °1857	Superior 730 (d) °1868	Vieux Chaslain (d) °1847	La Grise
Coco	Fille de Superior 730 (d)
Prince Chaldean °1877

== Descent and legacy ==
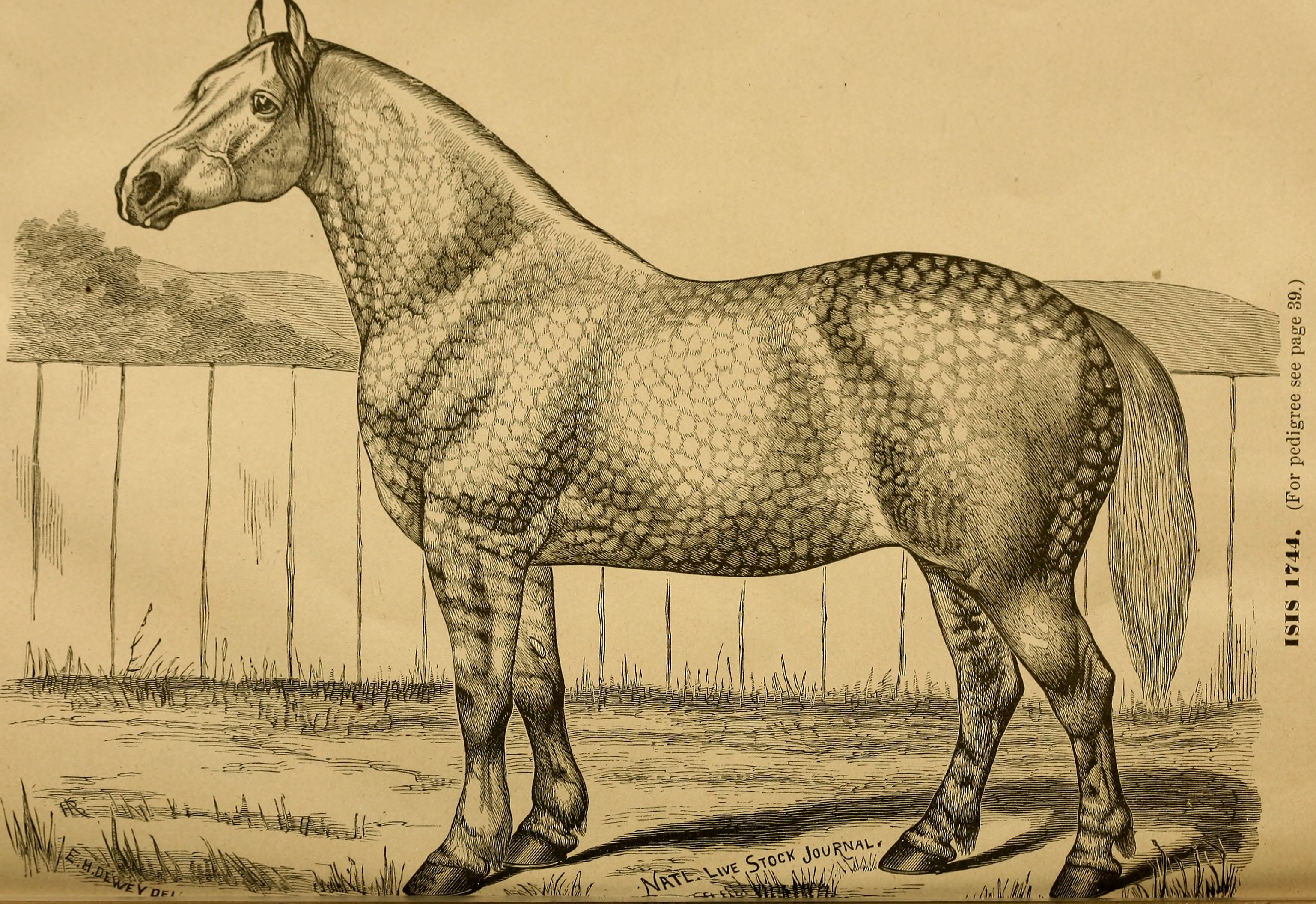
Isis 1744, a daughter of Prince Chaldean

Chaldean is said to have been a very popular sire, producing between 75 and 90 foals a year. All his foals were gray, regardless of the color of the dam.

One of his daughters, registered in the American Percheron Studbook, is the mare Isis 1744, dam of Primus 5705, Horus 6491, and Ilderim 10356, the latter presented by H.C. Farnum and awarded third prize at the Detroit International Show in 1890.

Prince Chaldean °1877
Isis 1744 °1881
Primus 5705 °1886	Horus 6491 °1887	Ilderim 10356
Flora 23908 °1899	Don 23907	Hattie 29785	Sverdrup 51628 °1905

In 1889, American illustrator Lou Burk drew Chaldean to illustrate the cover of an issue of the Breeder's Gazette, published on May 28, 1890. This illustration is described as being very accurate with the horse used as a model.
