= Rainbow Hills, Illinois =

- Unincorporated community
- Location within Illinois Location within the United States
- Coordinates: 41°55′10″N 88°22′12″W
- Country: United States
- State: Illinois
- County: Kane
- Township: St. Charles
- Elevation: 837 ft (255 m)
- Time zone: UTC-6 (Central (CST))
  - Summer (DST): UTC-5 (CDT)
- Area code: 630
- GNIS feature ID: 416354

Rainbow Hills is an unincorporated community in Kane County, Illinois, United States. It is located near the intersection of Peck Road and Illinois Route 64, and is also near the Disc Golf Course in St Charles.
