= Five Island Park, Illinois =

- Unincorporated community
- Location within Illinois Location within the United States
- Coordinates: 41°58′18″N 88°18′35″W
- Country: United States
- State: Illinois
- County: Kane
- Township: St. Charles
- Elevation: 699 ft (213 m)
- Time zone: UTC-6 (Central (CST))
  - Summer (DST): UTC-5 (CDT)
- Area codes: 847 & 224
- GNIS feature ID: 408416

Five Island Park is an unincorporated community in Kane County, Illinois, United States. It is mostly a neighborhood east of Randall Road and on the Fox River. The actual neighborhood itself is located on LaFox Street.
