= St. Charles Township, Illinois =

St. Charles Township
- Township
- Location in Kane County

- Kane County's location in Illinois
- Coordinates: 41°56′34″N 88°19′12″W
- Country: United States
- State: Illinois
- County: Kane
- Established: November 6, 1849

Area
  - Total: 35.59 sq mi (92.2 km^{2})
  - Land: 34.60 sq mi (89.6 km^{2})
  - Water: 1.00 sq mi (2.6 km^{2}) 2.80%
- Elevation: 728 ft (222 m)

Population (2020)
  - Total: 51,902
  - Density: 1,500/sq mi (579.2/km^{2})
- Time zone: UTC-6 (CST)
  - Summer (DST): UTC-5 (CDT)
- ZIP codes: 60103, 60119, 60134, 60174, 60175, 60177, 60184
- FIPS code: 17-089-66716
- Website: www.stcharlestownship.org

St. Charles Township is one of sixteen townships in Kane County, Illinois, USA. As of the 2020 census, its population was 51,902 and it contained 20,053 housing units.

== Geography ==
According to the 2021 census gazetteer files, St. Charles Township has a total area of 35.59 square miles (92.18 km^{2}), of which 34.60 square miles (89.61 km^{2}) (or 97.20%) is land and 1.00 square mile (2.59 km^{2}) (or 2.80%) is water. It is divided by the Fox River.

=== Cities, towns, villages ===
- Bartlett (west edge)
- Campton Hills (partial)
- Elburn (east edge)
- Geneva (partial)
- South Elgin (partial)
- St. Charles (vast majority)
- Wayne (west half)

=== Other communities ===
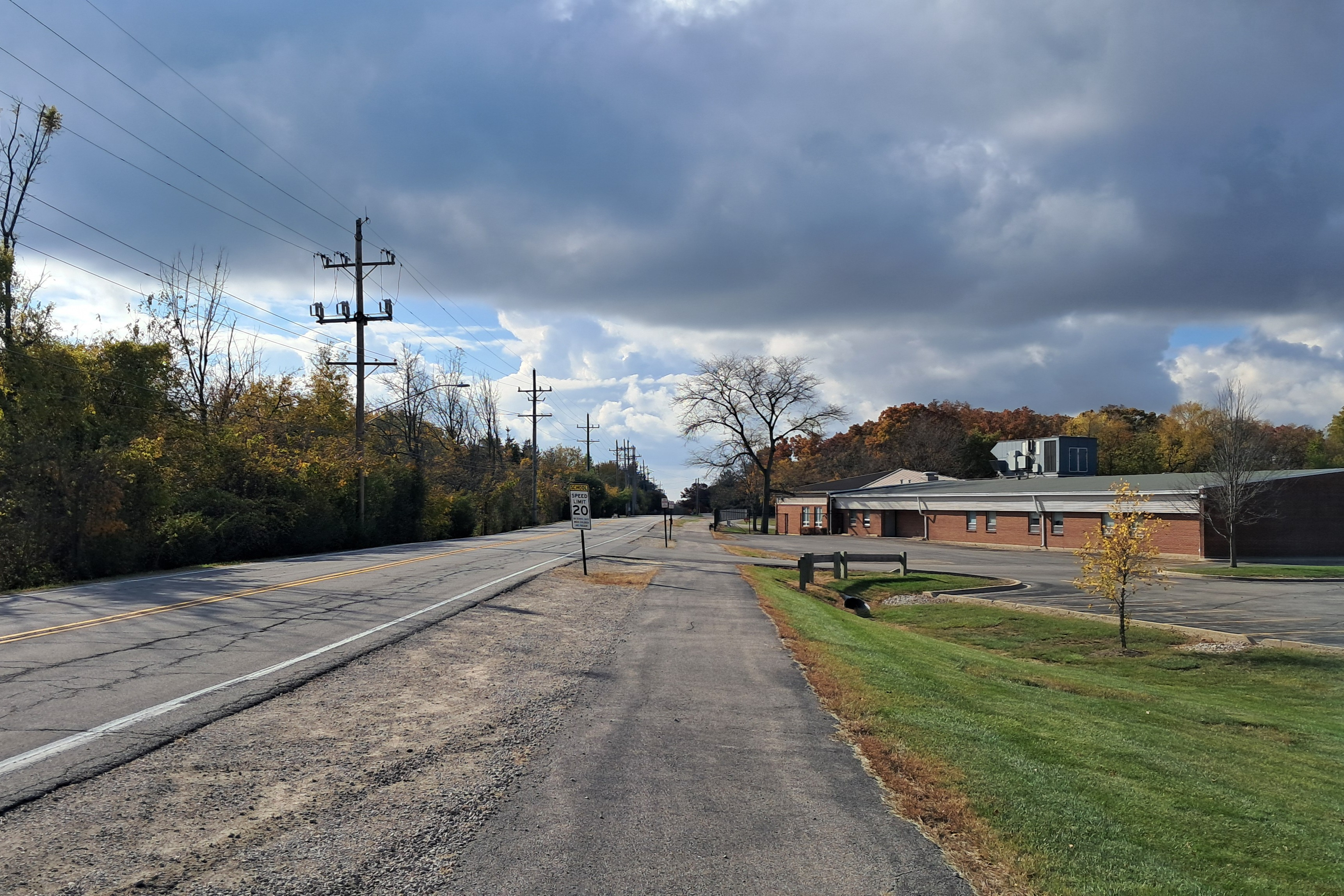
Fox River Trail in Valley View

- Five Island Park at 41.971668°N 88.309723°W
- Rainbow Hills at 41.922382°N 88.365786°W
- Valley View at 41.966259°N 88.298836°W: an unincorporated community. It is in between the cities of St. Charles and South Elgin. Valley View consists of new development on a narrow tract of land between IL-25 and a bend in the Fox River.

== Demographics ==
As of the 2020 census there were 51,902 people, 18,676 households, and 14,272 families residing in the township. The population density was 1,458.17 inhabitants per square mile (563.00/km^{2}). There were 20,053 housing units at an average density of 563.38 per square mile (217.52/km^{2}). The racial makeup of the township was 79.85% White, 1.94% African American, 0.38% Native American, 5.34% Asian, 0.02% Pacific Islander, 4.56% from other races, and 7.91% from two or more races. Hispanic or Latino of any race were 11.26% of the population.

There were 18,676 households, out of which 36.30% had children under the age of 18 living with them, 63.41% were married couples living together, 9.76% had a female householder with no spouse present, and 23.58% were non-families. 19.40% of all households were made up of individuals, and 8.60% had someone living alone who was 65 years of age or older. The average household size was 2.73 and the average family size was 3.13.

The township's age distribution consisted of 22.6% under the age of 18, 9.3% from 18 to 24, 22.9% from 25 to 44, 31.2% from 45 to 64, and 14.0% who were 65 years of age or older. The median age was 41.2 years. For every 100 females, there were 101.5 males. For every 100 females age 18 and over, there were 100.8 males.

The median income for a household in the township was $108,454, and the median income for a family was $130,335. Males had a median income of $76,234 versus $35,290 for females. The per capita income for the township was $52,351. About 2.3% of families and 3.6% of the population were below the poverty line, including 1.5% of those under age 18 and 4.9% of those age 65 or over.

Historical population
| Census | Pop. | Note | %± |
|---|---|---|---|
| 2000 | 42,059 | | — |
| 2010 | 50,854 | | 20.9% |
| 2020 | 51,902 | | 2.1% |
U.S. Decennial Census

== School districts ==
- Geneva Community Unit School District 304
- Elgin Area School District U46
- St. Charles Community Unit School District 303

== Political districts ==
- Illinois's 14th congressional district
- State House District 49
- State House District 50
- State House District 55
- State Senate District 25
- State Senate District 28

== Notable people ==
- Lester Frank Ward (1841-1913), sociologist
