= Horse body mass =

Horse body weight and weight measurement

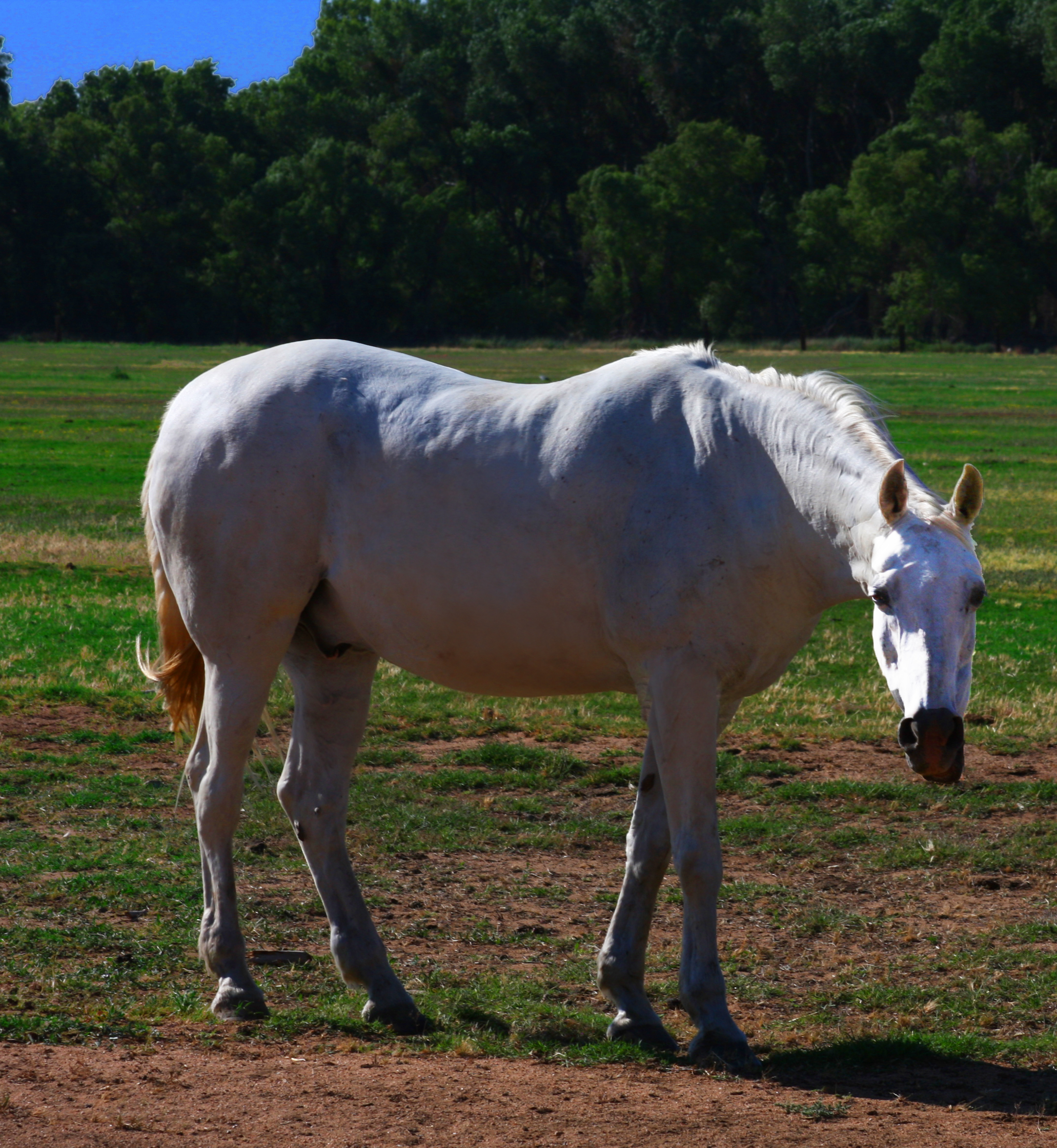
Obese American horse: fat deposits can be seen on the back, between the ribs and on the rump

The horse body mass is highly variable, depending on breed, model, physiological state, condition, owner's purpose and usage of the animal. Always 65% to 75% water, it is divided on average between 50% muscle, 11% bone and 10% fat. Depending on whether it's a pony or a draft horse, it can range from less than 200 kg to over a ton, with an average of 500 kg for saddle horses. It also differs with the season, as horses are almost always fatter in summer than in winter. Various tools are used to estimate their weight and body condition, and veterinary scales have been created to determine whether a horse has an ideal body mass according to precise criteria. Thinness is associated with mistreatment, but owner-independent factors such as age and illness can cause dramatic weight loss in horses. In Western countries, equine obesity is one of the major veterinary health problems of the 21st century. It is directly linked to numerous pathologies, such as laminitis, osteoarthritis, insulin resistance and colic. It also favors the development of equine Cushing's disease, and causes a drop in stallion fertility.

== General information ==
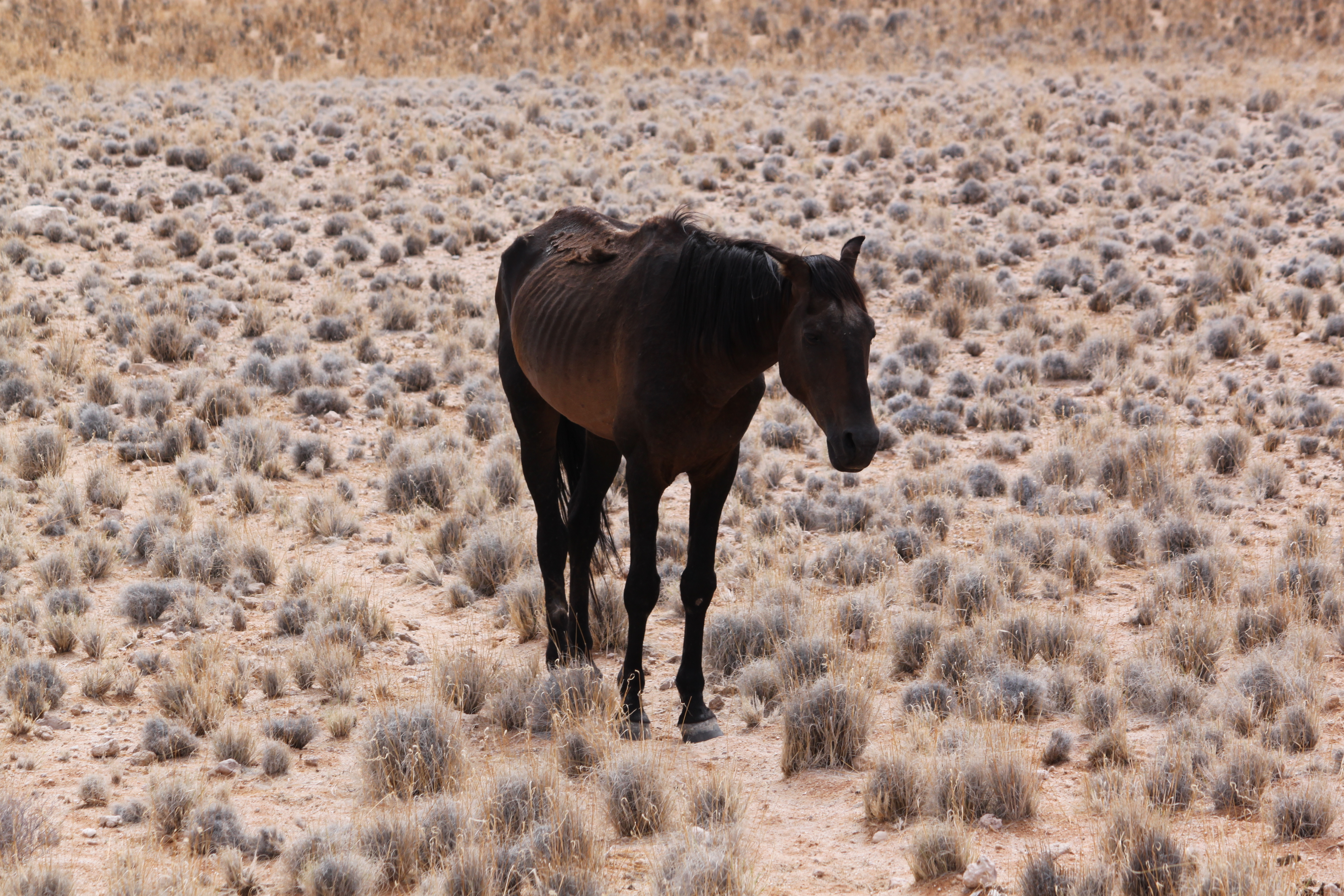
Namib horse in poor body condition in February

The horse body mass is always 65-75 % water. The horse is considered a "thin animal" (with little fat), whose weight is divided into approximately 11% bone, 50% muscle and 9% fat; but a large number of factors influence its weight. Some breeds (draft horses) are naturally heavier than others (ponies), and differ in size and bone structure, so the weight range of horses is highly variable. Ponies can weigh less than 200 kg and heavy horses more than a ton, while the average weight of a saddle horse is estimated at around 500 kg. Champion show-jumper Jappeloup de Luze, for example, weighed around 470 kg. Heavy horses bred for slaughter reach particularly high weights, as it's in the breeder's interest to get maximum meat weight out of them.

Weight is also affected by physiological conditions: the horse may be growing, pregnant or breeding. The purpose of breeding and the animal usage also call for different body conditions: for example, a horse destined for sport should always be as close as possible to its ideal weight, to remain a top performer. On the other hand, a pregnant or nursing mare will be in better shape if she has a higher than average body mass, with some fat reserves.

Estimating a horse's weight is important in a number of ways for the owner of a domestic horse: dosing its feed ration, administering anthelmintics or other medication, or monitoring its growth and state of health. In these cases, we're talking about the horse's weight, not its health.

=== Growth ===
Foal growth leads to particularly rapid weight gain in the first few months. At birth, foals weigh 8 to 12% of their mother's live weight. They double their birth weight during their first month of life. By the time they reach weaning age, at around 6 or 7 months, their weight has quintupled. By the age of one, they have reached around 65% of their adult weight and 90% of their adult height, which explains the often gangly appearance of foals at this age. Draft foals fattened for slaughter weigh on average 59.3% of the adult horse's live weight at 8 months, then 70.1% at 12 months, and 90.1% at 30 months.

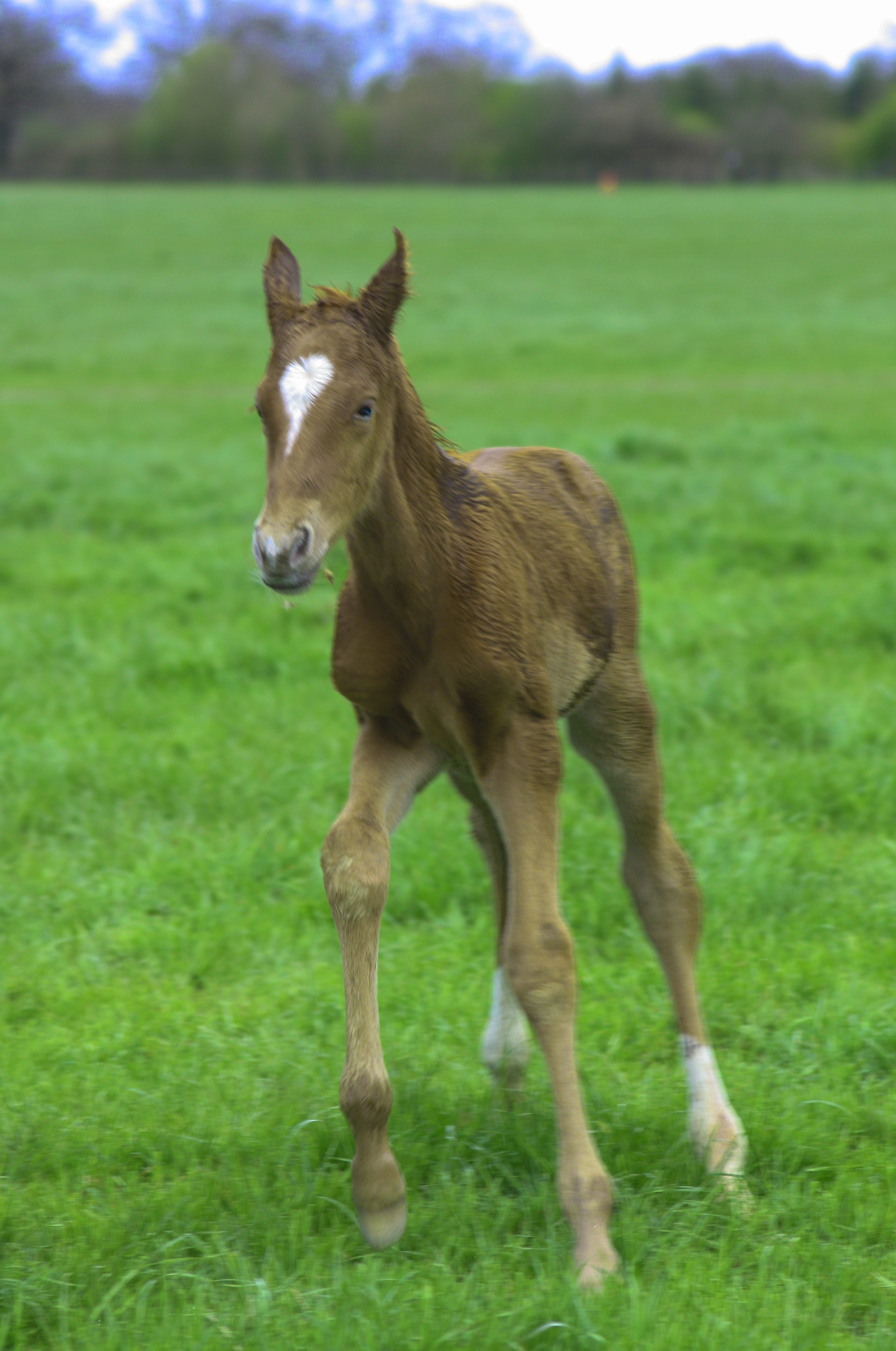
Newborn saddle foal

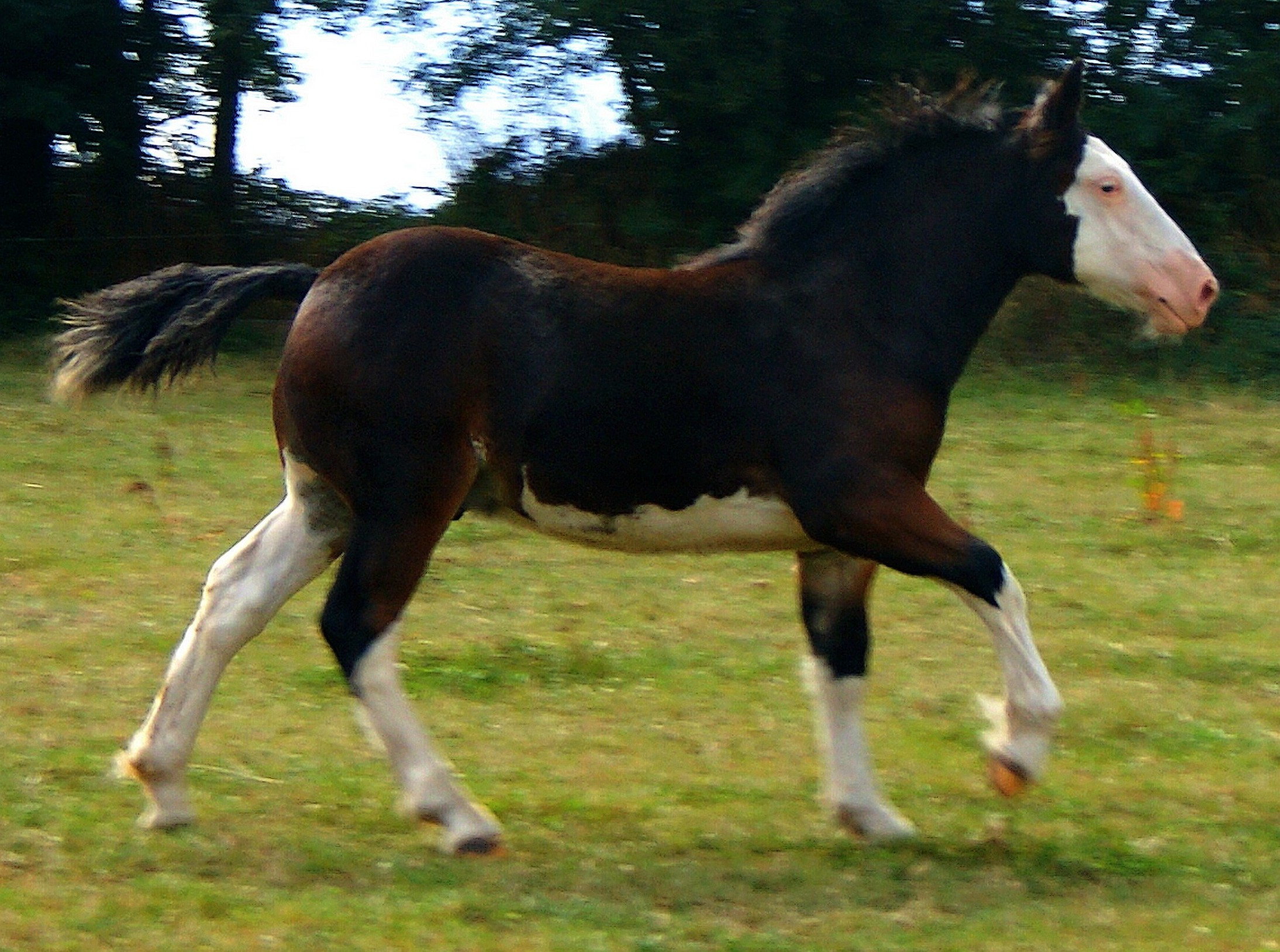
4-month-old draft foal

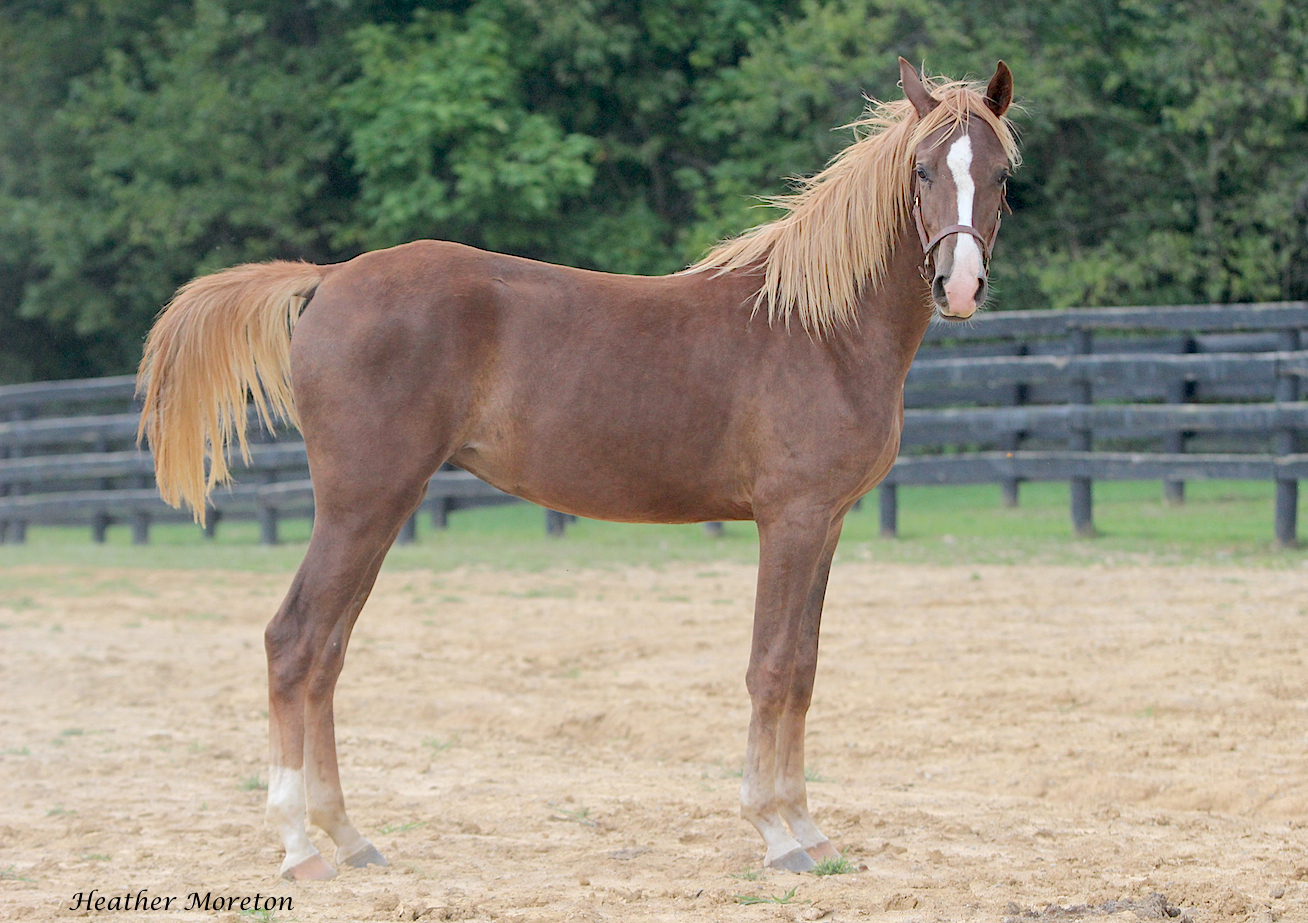
Yearling saddle foal

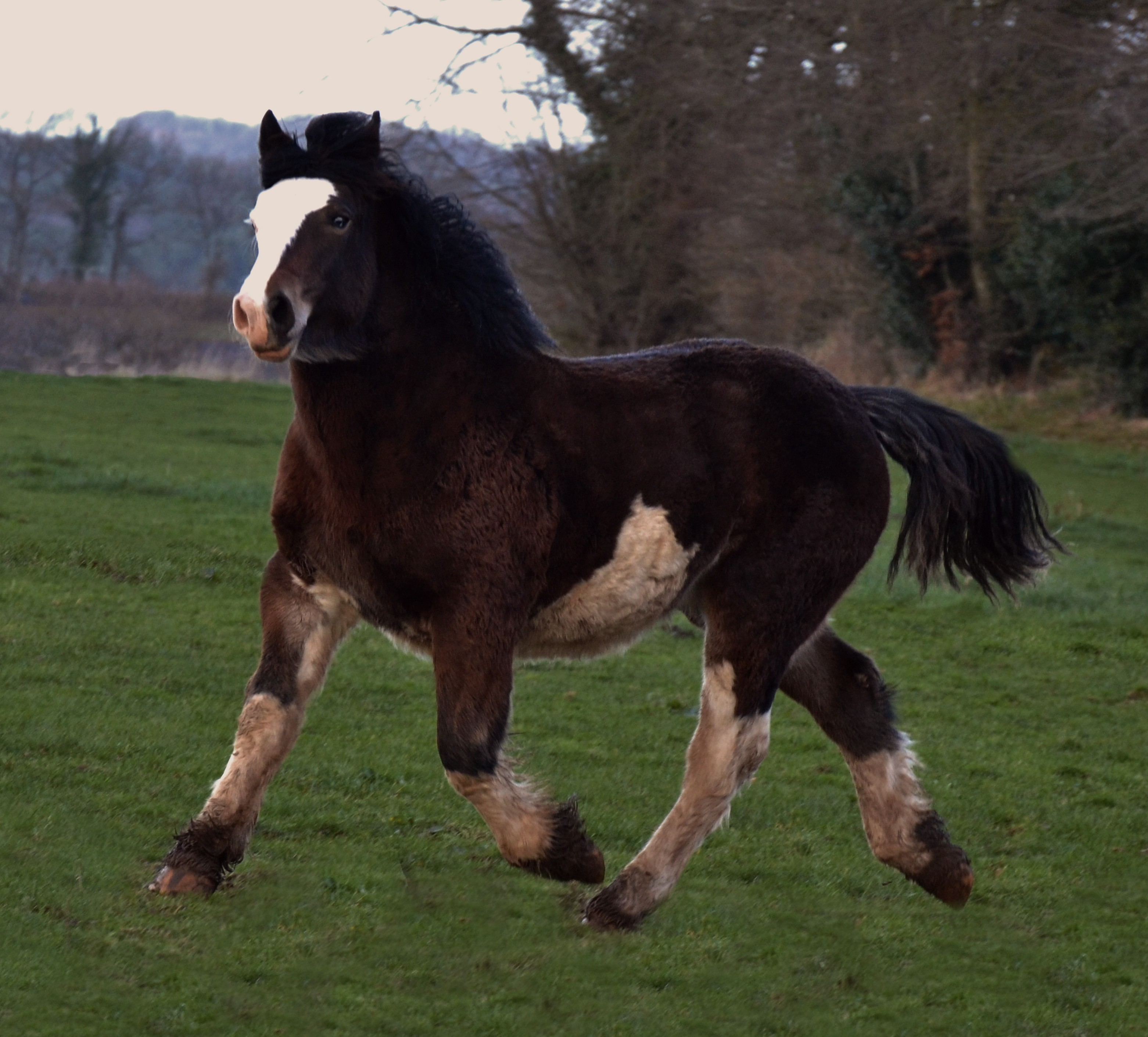
Yearling draft foal

=== Seasonal variations ===
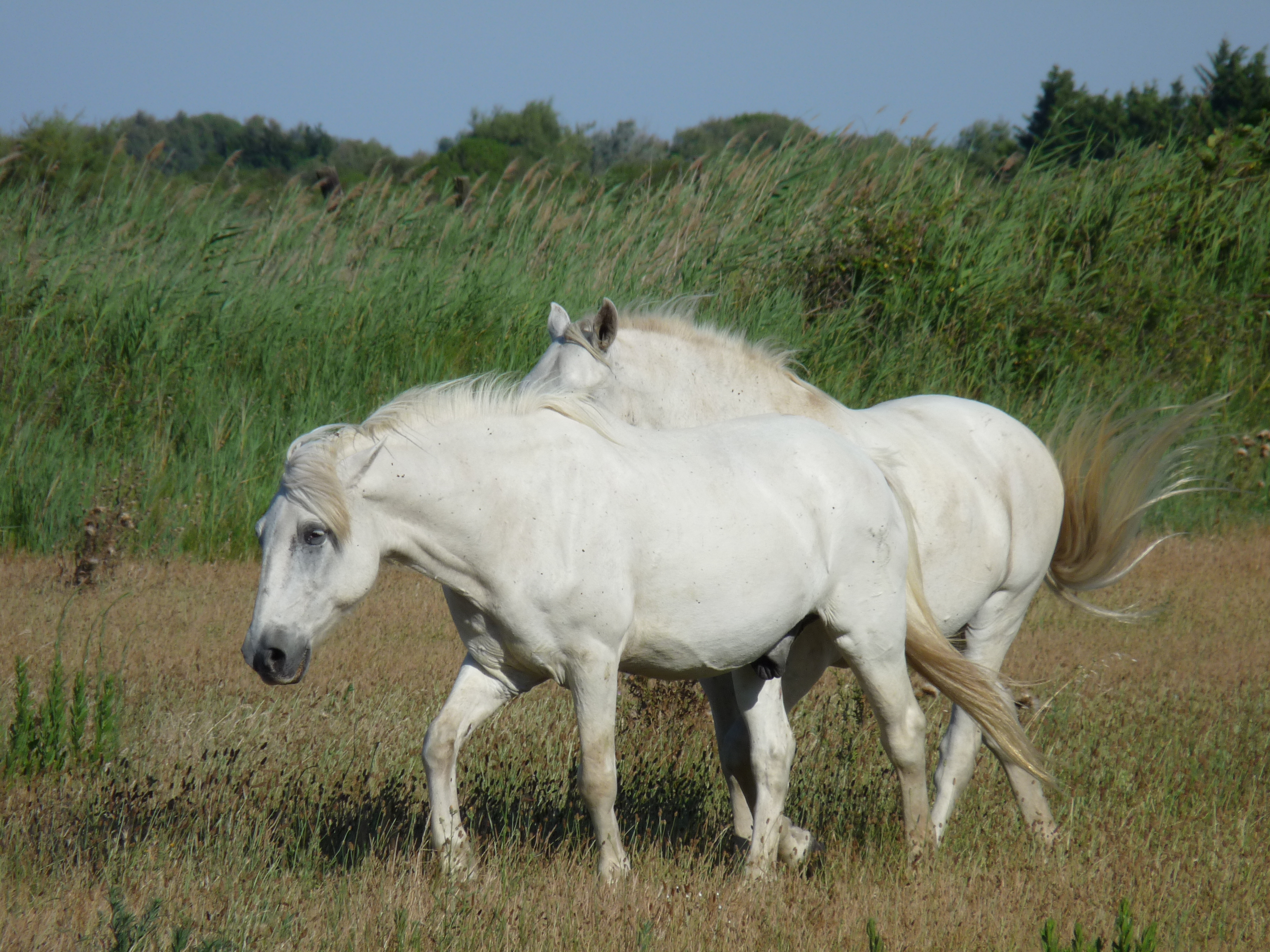
Camargue horses in good body condition, during the summer

Horses are almost always fatter in summer than in winter, especially if they live outdoors all year round, or in the wild. In summer, changes in light levels lead to an increase in appetite and changes in metabolism, which generally result in weight gain. In winter, on the other hand, appetite is reduced and the efficiency of energy conservation is increased, as the food available is generally scarcer. This particularity seems to stem from the horse's long evolutionary history in an environment that does not always offer the same quantity of food from one season to the next, nor from one year to the next. The obesity rate can differ by around 8% depending on whether measurements are taken in summer or winter. The horse body condition is at its lowest at the end of winter.

== Estimating weight and body condition ==
Weight and body condition are two notions that are assessed independently. Along with body dimensions, weight is a component of size.

=== Estimating weight ===
Weight can be estimated visually, by weighing or by tape weighing.

==== Visual estimation ====
Visual estimation is the simplest, but it is empirical and often wrong, depending on the experience of the assessor. Consequently, this is the method used by professionals in everyday conditions, without excluding the use of weighing in special situations, notably to monitor animal growth.

==== Weighing ====
Weighing is the process of estimating weight using specialized weighing equipment. A priori, this is the most accurate method of determining an animal weight, but in the case of a horse, it is necessary to use equipment such as a weighing cage (preferably removable) or a weighing platform. These tools are relatively expensive, and the vast majority of horse owners don't own them.

On the other hand, breeders and professionals in the horse market often acquire them, not only for the precision of the measurement, but also to perfect their judgment, through visual appreciation. In breeding areas, some communes are equipped with a weighbridge, which can accommodate a van or cattle truck. Weighing results must also be interpreted according to the assumed state of replenishment of the digestive tract.

==== Tape weighing ====
Tape weighing is the method of estimating an animal weight using mathematical formulas based on body dimensions. These formulas were devised to compensate for the disadvantages of visual estimation and the constraints of mechanical weighing. They were initially used for educational purposes, in training centers, and as a complement to previous methods. These formulas have generally been developed for adult, mesomorphic animals in a normal state of maintenance and with an average level of digestive tract replenishment. The values collected must therefore be interpreted according to age, body proportions (brachymorphic, mesomorphic or dolichomorphic), state of maintenance and estimated replenishment of the digestive tract.

As a result, various scales and mathematical formulas have been created to estimate a horse weight using simple tools, or without tools at all. The tape weighing, placed around the body between the withers and the girth area (corresponding to the thoracic perimeter, TP on the diagram), gives an estimate of weight.

==== Crevat formula ====
In 1890, Jules Crevat created a formula and a tape weighing bearing his name, still used today for educational purposes in zootechnics. Crevat's original idea was to quickly estimate the weight of cattle that had to pay a octroi tax. It is a simplification of a formula developed for humans by Adolphe Quetelet, which was based on two measurements (chest and waist perimeter). It is not very precise, but has the advantage of being easy to calculate, requiring only a measurement of the thoracic perimeter (TP). This is one of the most widely used formulas in France, especially for weighing saddle horses, but, as with all formulas, the estimate must be interpreted according to the state of maintenance of the animals and their proportions.

It is calculated as follows: Weight = 80 × (TP)^{3}, with Weight in kilograms and TP in meters. The margin of error is 25 kg. For example, for a horse with a thoracic perimeter of 1.82 m, Weight = 80 × (1.82)^{3}, giving 482 ± 25 kg.

==== Hapgood's formula ====
Alyssa Hapgood's formula was conceived in 1999, designed in 2002 and approved in 2004, when she was just 17 years old. It's one of the most accurate, but also requires more measurements, since it takes into account not only thoracic perimeter (TP), but also withers height (WH) and body length (BL), measured from the point of the shoulder to the point of the buttock: Weight = TP^{1,64} × WH^{0,95} × BL^{0,40} / 278. The formula works with weight expressed in pounds (0,453 592 37 kg) instead of kilos, and withers height in inches rather than centimeters.

To convert inches into centimeters, perform the following operation: po= cm x 0,393700787.

==== INRA formula for draft horses ====
A formula specific to draft horses was developed in 1990 by William Martin-Rosset, researcher in charge of equine nutrition at INRA: Weight = 7.3 × (TP) - 800. The margin of error is also 25 kg.

==== INRA formula for growing foals ====
Growing foals require special parameters, as withers height (WH) cannot be taken into account. INRA has devised a formula for this purpose: Weight = 4.5 × (TP) - 370.

=== Body condition assessment ===
This last measurement is designed to assess the relative development of muscle and fat mass. It is performed by palpating certain areas of the body.

==== Henneke scale ====
The Henneke horse body condition scoring system is used to assess the amount of fat on a horse's body. It was developed by Don R. Henneke at Texas A&M University in 1983, initially for pregnant Quarter Horse mares. This standardized system can be used for all horse breeds and without specialized equipment, but it may be more effective for saddle horses than ponies. Another limitation is that horse owners are not always the most objective when estimating their animal's body condition.

Body condition is assessed visually and by palpation. Scores range from 1 to 9, with 1 being a horse in poor condition and 9 being an obese horse. The ideal condition for most animals is between 4 and 6. Scores of 7 to 9 are considered obese, although a certain lack of precision in assessments sometimes leads to a horse with a score of less than 7 being classified as obese.

The table below describes the different scores used to assess a horse's body condition. The system is based on both visual and tactile assessment of the fat present on six points of the body, as shown in the illustration below.

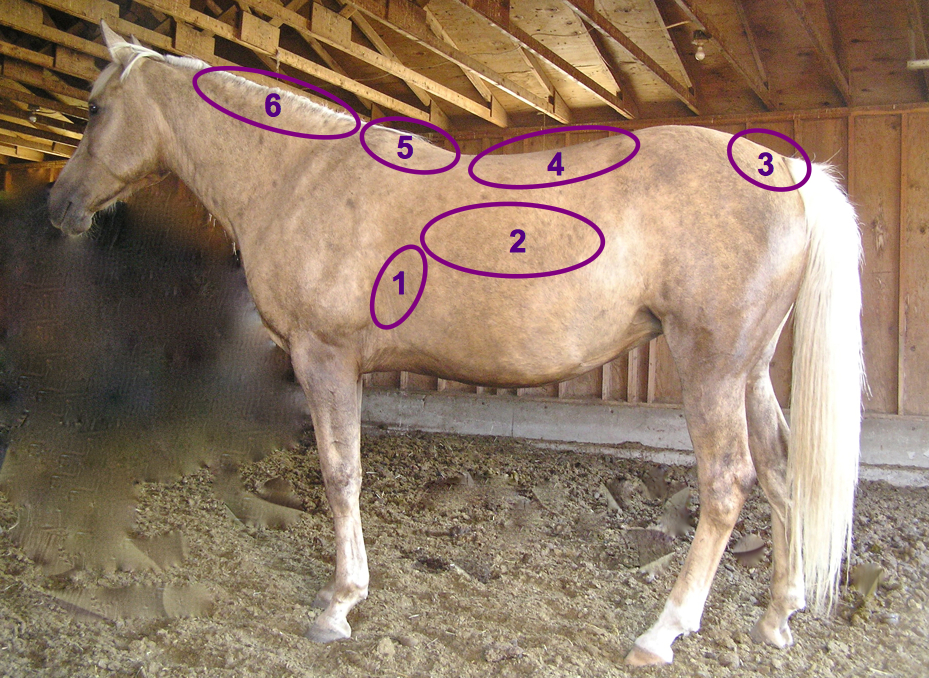
The areas where fat is deposited in horses, enabling body condition to be assessed by palpation: 1. Behind the shoulder; 2. On the ribs; 3. At the tail head; 4. Along the dorsal vertebrae; 5. Around the withers; 6. Along the neck.

This system is used by Anglo-Saxon organizations for legal purposes, as an objective method of determining a horse's physical condition during investigations into cruelty.

Henneke horse body condition scoring system
Score	Description	Image
1.Poor	Extremely emaciated, no visible fat deposits. Vertebrae, ribs, tail head, withers, shoulder and neck bones are very visible.	Horse scored 1 on the Henneke scale
2.Very thin	Emaciated, slight muscular coverage of bones, vertebrae and ribs clearly visible. Tail set, withers and shoulder bones, neck visible.	Horse scored 2 on the Henneke scale
3.Thin	Very light fat deposits all over the body, with vertebrae and ribs visible but not individually discernible. Withers, shoulders and neck do not appear thin.	Close-up of an old, emaciated horse at the end of winter
4.Moderately thin	The line of the spine and the long rib lines are visible; the tail set may be visible depending on the breed. Withers, shoulders and neck do not appear too thin.	Moderately thin horse but in 'good' condition
5.Moderate	The spine and ribs may not be visible but are easy to feel; the base of the tail is spongy. Withers, shoulders and neck are rounded and smooth.	Sport horse at ideal weight
6.Moderately fleshy	Slight swellings along the spine; ribs and tail head are covered with a light deposit of fat; detectable fat deposits along the withers and neck, and behind the shoulders.	Horse in good condition
7.Fleshy	Bulging along the spine, ribs show fat filling between them; base of tail is spongy; fat deposits along withers and neck, and behind shoulders.	Pony with visible fat deposits
8.Fat	Apparent bulge along spine; ribs difficult to feel; soft fat surrounding base of tail; fat deposits along withers, behind shoulders and inside thighs.	Horse scored 8 on the Henneke scale
9.Obesity	Obvious fat deposits all along the spine, fat deposits on ribs, at base of tail, withers, behind shoulders, and on neck. Fat covers flanks and inner thighs.	This pony's obesity is clearly visible, with fat covering the flanks and a very thick neck.

== Problems associated with under- and overweight ==
Horse fat is neither inert matter nor the result of simple "storage". Studies have shown that it is active tissue, particularly in the secretion of hormones and inflammatory proteins (cytokines), the presence or absence of which can severely affect the animal's health. More surprisingly, body condition is related to dominance, with horses in better condition tending to dominate others.

=== Thinness ===
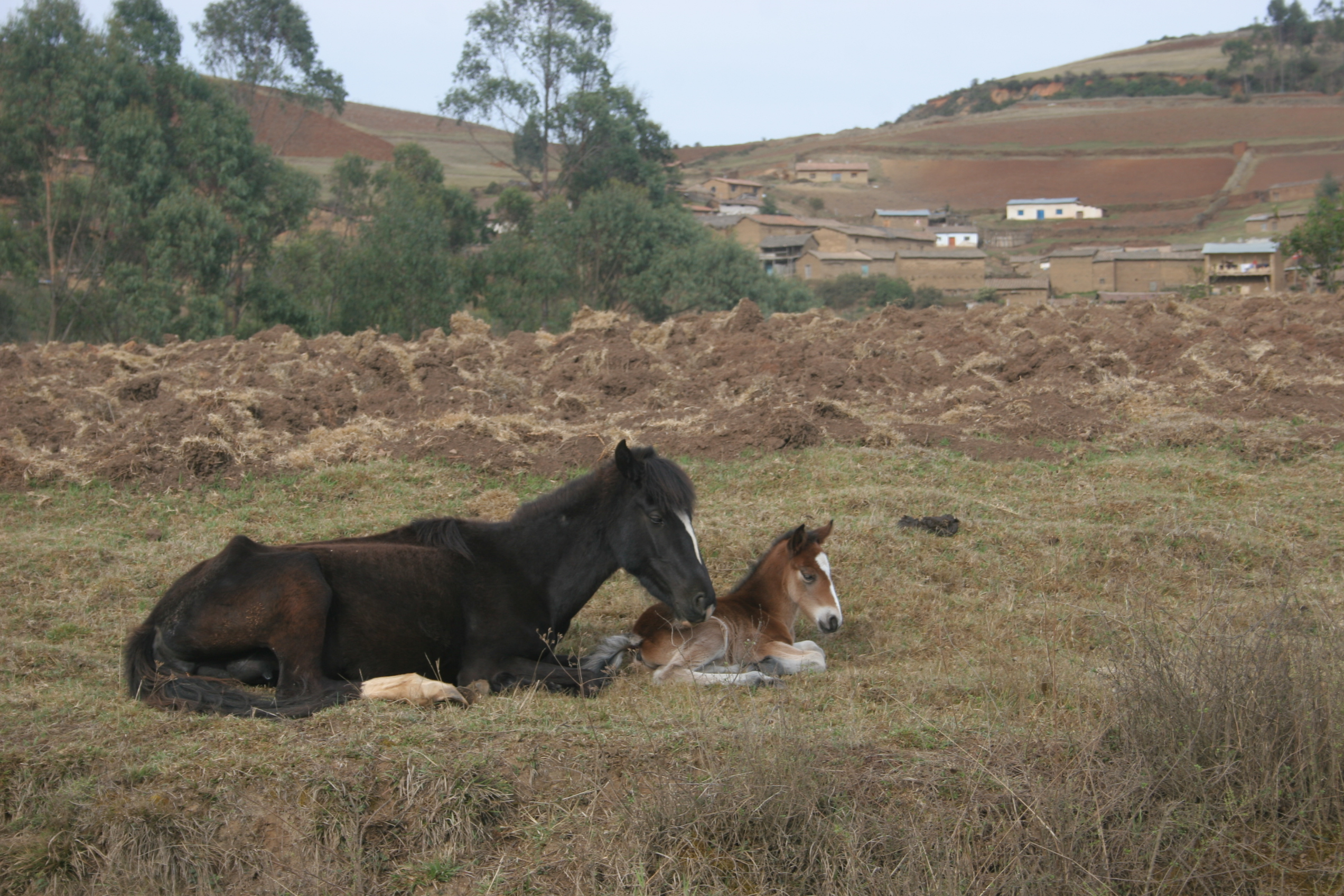
Thin mare with its foal in Peru

Thinness can have many causes. In geriatric horses, it may be due to parasite infestation. Furthermore, they tend to become thinner and more sensitive to the passing of the seasons, losing weight and body fat. These weight losses can have multiple causes: deficiencies, dental problems, lack of appetite, digestive problems, etc. They are an aggravating factor in horse mortality. They are an aggravating factor in mortality. It's hard to get an old horse to put on weight again. The problem of losing weight can cause problems for owners of older horses, who are sometimes wrongly suspected of animal abuse. Indeed, most animal protection associations consider thinness to be a sign of horse abuse. Numerous cases of mistreatment have involved owners who have fed their animals poorly (or not at all), with the result that they have been found in a state of emaciation that is sometimes considerable.

Thinness is a controversial issue at endurance competitions. Excessive weight is very detrimental to a horse's performance. Trainers and riders resort to various techniques to keep their horses as thin and muscular (fit) as possible. Controversy erupted in the sport after a particularly skinny mare was found at a competition at Compiègne, perhaps after an unexpected weight loss in the day leading up to the race, or during the race itself.

=== Obesity ===
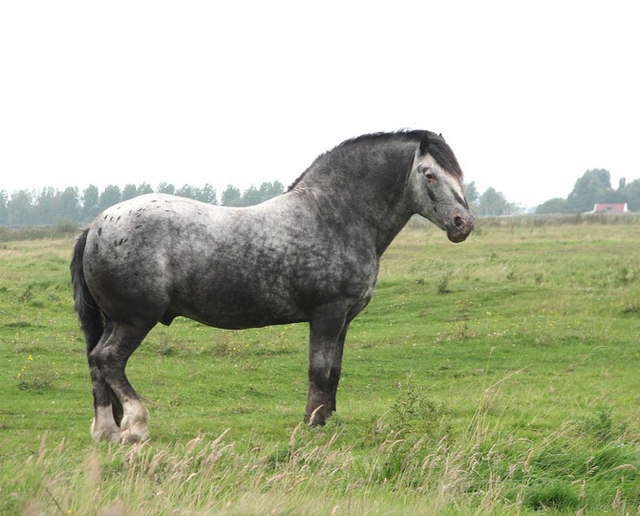
Obese horse with heavy fat deposits along the neck (cresty neck)

Equine obesity is a recent phenomenon. The general rate of obesity in horses is increasing in Western countries, as it is in domestic dogs and cats. Between 1998 and 2005, the National Animal Health Monitoring System (USA) estimates that the obesity rate rose from 1.5% to 3.5% of the equine population. This rate rises to 19% obese (score of 8 or 9 on the Henneke scale) and 32% overweight (6.5 to 7.5 on the scale), in an American study published in 2007. Similar results (20% obese and 48% overweight) were achieved in a North Carolina study the following year. Around 45% of saddle horses assessed by their owners in Scotland in 2008 were described as obese. According to data published in March 2015, 31% of British horses are obese. In France, although no equivalent study has been carried out, obesity is common in Percheron, Boulonnais, Bretons and Comtois draft horses when destined for the meat market. There is some evidence to suggest that the fat deposit along the horse's neck, known as the 'cresty neck', indicates a high degree of obesity.

==== Causes and factors of obesity ====
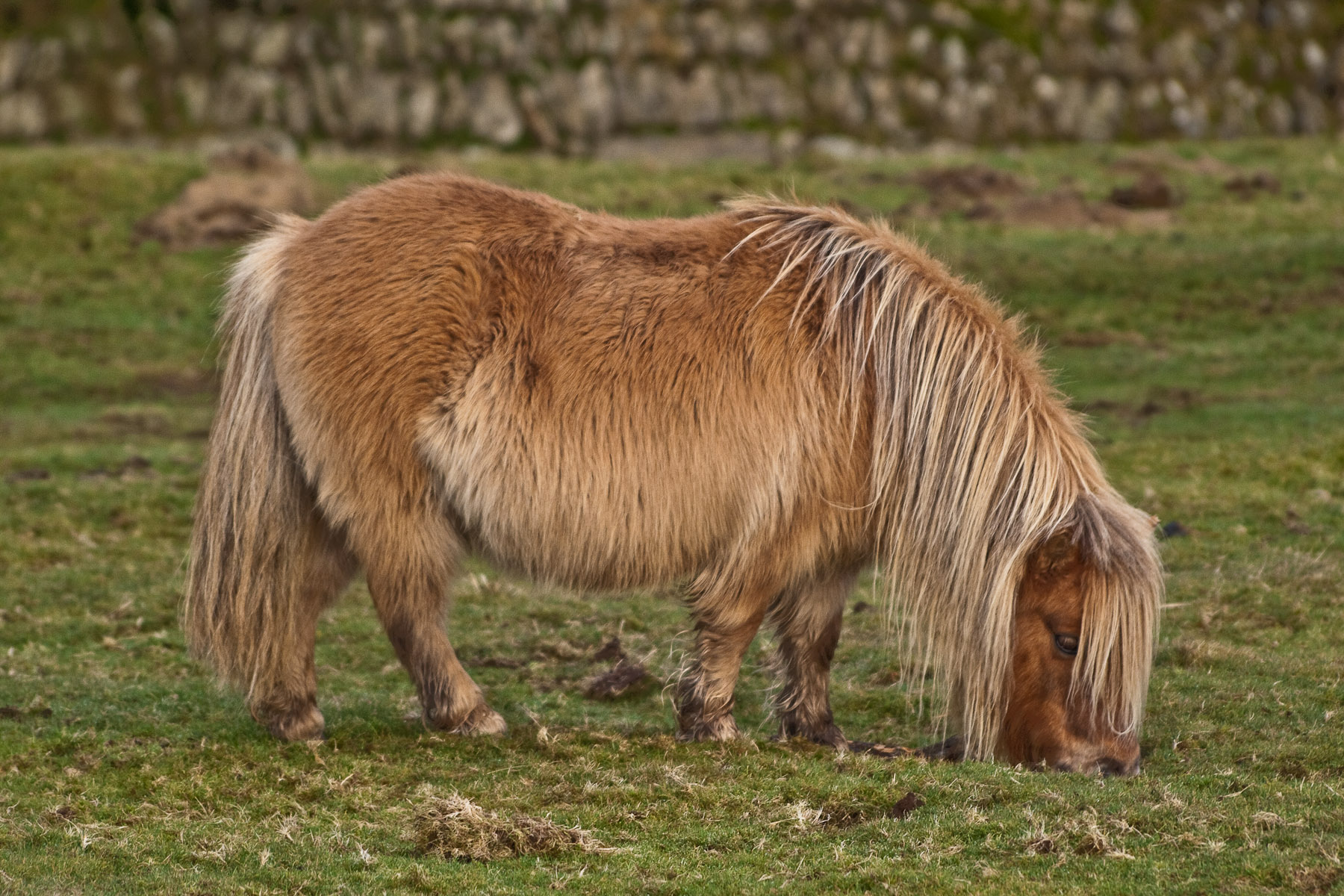
Obese pony on Dartmoor

Like all forms of obesity, equine obesity is essentially the result of a poor balance between energy intake and energy expenditure. This explains why foals, which expend a great deal of energy during their growth, are much more rarely obese than adult animals. Thus, the primary cause of obesity is the overly rich diet provided by horse owners. Cultural factors also come into play, as people with little knowledge of horses' body condition tend to compliment owners of fat animals, and find obese ponies "cute". According to a study carried out in the UK (2011), there is a significant lack of understanding of a horse's energy requirements among many equine owners, particularly those who own recreational equines. Equine owners also often underestimate the duration and intensity of exercise a horse is capable of every day, imagining, for example, that a daily walk at a walk of 20 to 40 minutes represents a significant expenditure of energy, when this is far from being the case.

There's a persistent belief that all ponies are genetically predisposed to putting on weight compared to horses. The reality is more nuanced. There are indeed genetic causes, with certain breeds of hardy ponies (such as the British Mountain and Moorland) being predisposed to put on weight if they have free access to rich food. Lack of exercise is another determining cause. Ponies are more often kept as pets than horses, which also leads to less frequent exercise, a factor in obesity. Certain breeds, such as Highland and Welsh Cob ponies, are almost systematically shown in obese condition at competitions. In the United States, Halter competitions are attended by overweight horses, who are rewarded. An investigation by the periodical Cheval Savoir calls into question breeders and show judges of heavy French breeds, particularly the Breton horse syndicate, which awards model and gait premiums to fat, even lame animals, and judges horses in use as too thin, thus depriving their breeders of premiums awarded to obese horses. Generally speaking, people who come into contact with horses on a daily basis seem to get so used to seeing overweight animals that they come to regard this body condition as the norm.

==== Obesity-related comorbidities ====
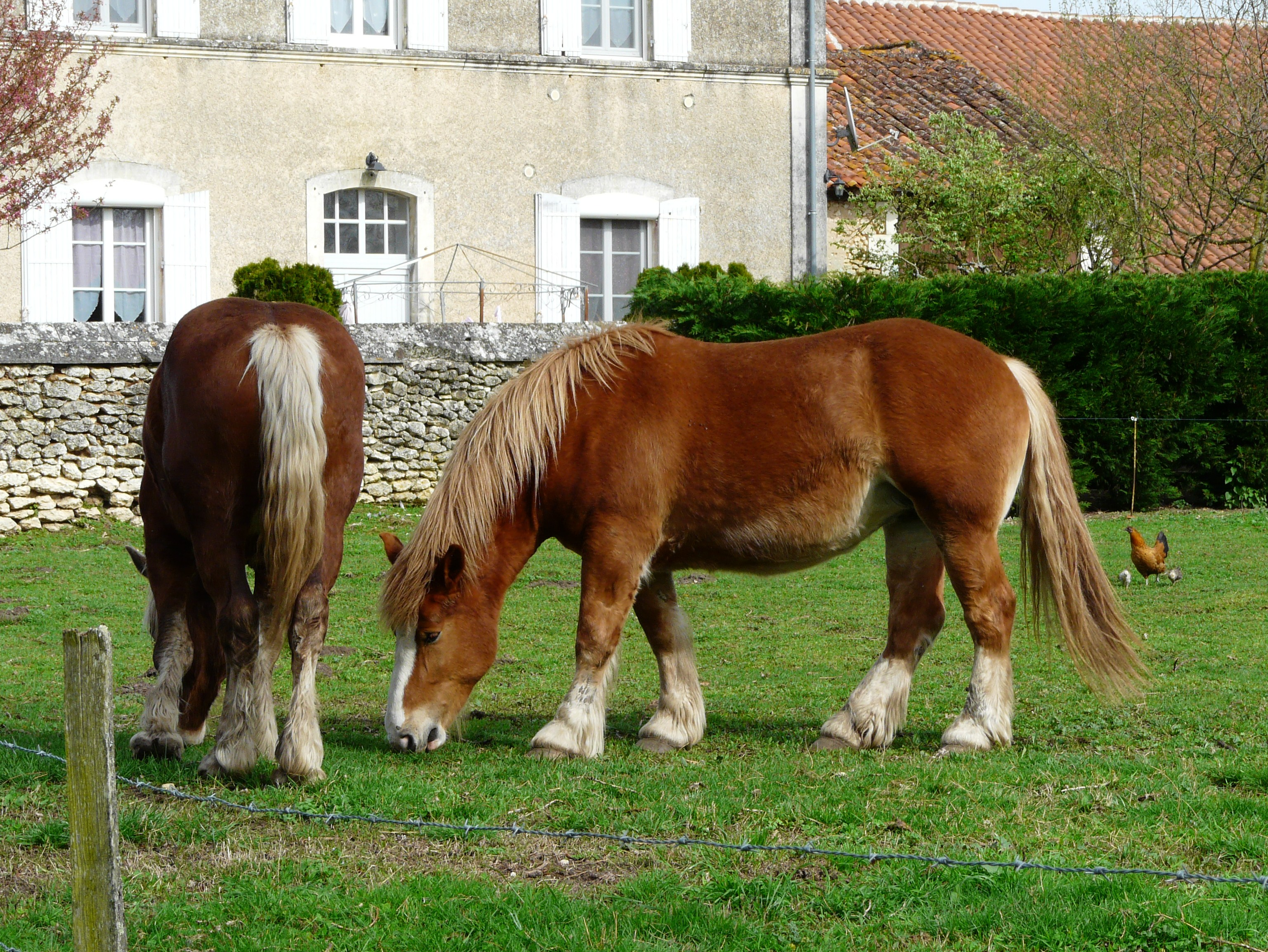
Obese Breton horses, probably intended for slaughter

Horse owners are generally unaware of the health risks associated with obesity.

- Too much weight and too rich a diet can lead to laminitis, especially if the horse or pony has unlimited access to pasture.
- Obesity also increases the risk of earlier and more severe development of osteoarthritis, as well as colic.
- Equine obesity has been implicated in the increase in cases of insulin resistance, known as equine metabolic syndrome, a condition that reveals close similarities with the onset of human type 2 diabetes.
- It also favors the onset of equine Cushing's disease, usually around eleven to thirteen years of age.
- Overweight stallions tend to be less fertile than those of normal weight. One study found that obesity in mares was associated with disturbances in the estrous cycle and metabolic status.
- Finally, a higher risk of injury was observed in obese horses, probably due to joint weakness and metabolic complications.

All these observations have led the scientific community to consider equine obesity as one of the major veterinary health problems in Western countries, if not the most important equine veterinary health problem in these countries.

The recommended treatment for obesity is to adapt the horse's diet to the equestrian work or exercise required of it, as in the case of pathology (locomotor apparatus, cardiological problems, etc.), i.e. generally to reduce nutritional intake.

Obesity-related comorbidity is rarely taken into account by breeders (and breeders' associations) of heavy horses intended for slaughter, as they are generally slaughtered before expressing health problems linked to their excess weight.

== Records ==
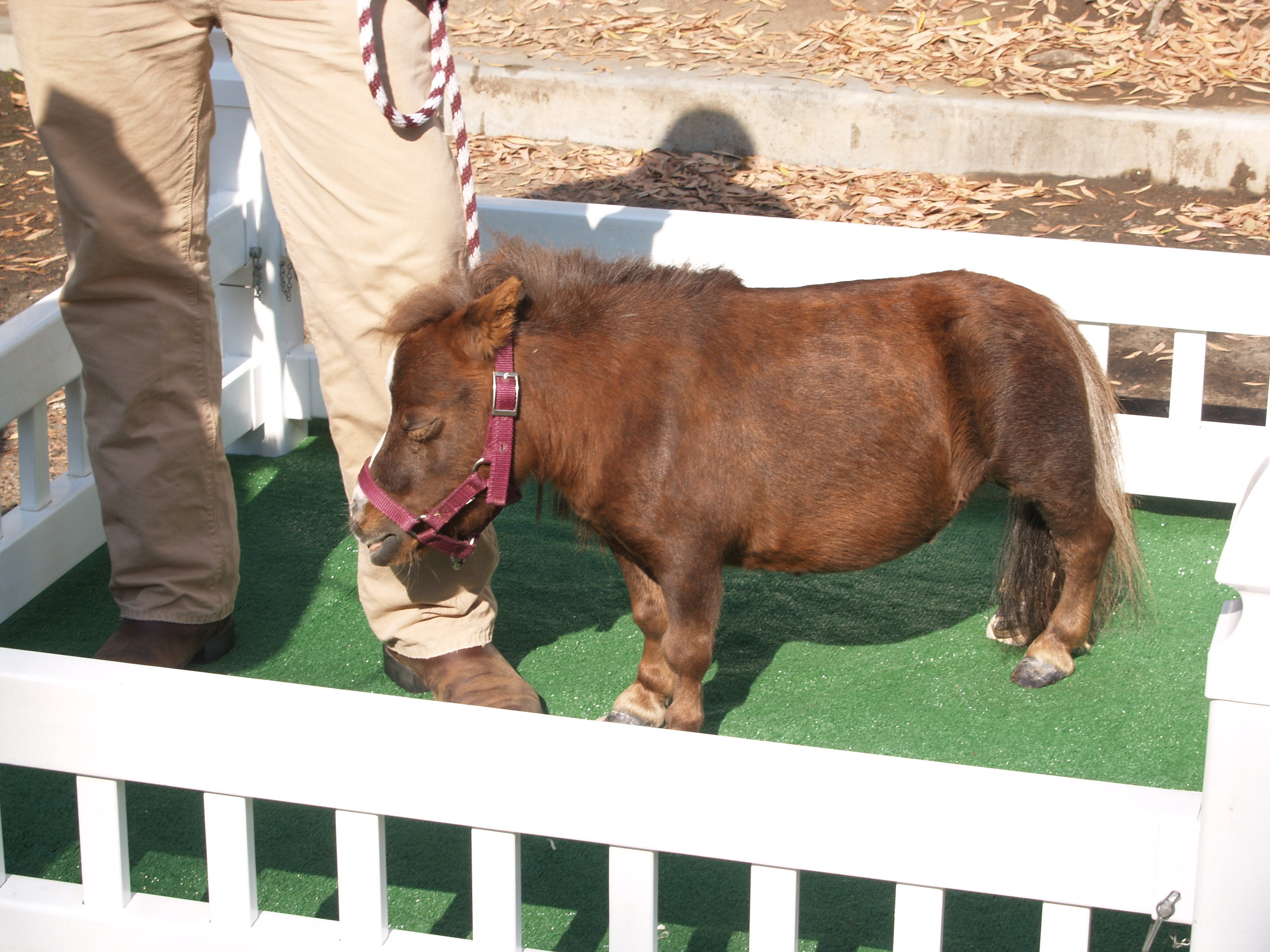
Thumbelina, dwarf mare weighing 26 kg

Various weight records have been set for horses. Thumbelina, the smallest known miniature horse, weighs 26 kg as an adult, compared with 3.9 kg at birth. She has been recognized as the world's smallest horse, and one of the lightest. Lighter at birth, but not recognized by the Guinness Book of World Records, Einstein is a miniature foal born weighing 2.7 kg, with a height of 35.5 cm, who is not affected by dwarfism.

One of the heaviest horses ever weighed is the Belgian draft stallion Brooklyn Supreme, who weighed 1,440 kg just before his death in 1948 at the age of 20. This animal was in a state of obesity.

In August 1989, the Canadian Thoroughbred Tritonis was recognized as the world's tallest and heaviest non-draft horse, measuring 1.98 m at the withers and weighing 950 kg. He died in September 1990, aged 7.

== See also ==
- Equine Cushing's disease
- Equine nutrition
- Horse welfare reforms

== Bibliography ==
- Arné, Véronique; Zalkind, Jean-Marc (2007). L'élevage du cheval (in French). Educagri Editions. p. 239. ISBN 978-2-84444-443-1.
- Carter, Rebecca A. (2008). Equine obesity and its role in insuline resistance, inflammation and risk for laminitis (PDF). Faculté de Virginie.
- Dossenbach, Hans D. (1995). "Record Weights". A Complete Guide to Horses. Barnes & Noble. ISBN 9781566199520.
- Martinson, K. L.; Coleman, R. C.; Rendahl, A. K.; Fang, Z.; McCue, M. E. (2014). "Estimation of body weight and development of a body weight score for adult equids". Journal of Animal Science. 92 (5). J. Anim. Sci.: 2230–2238. doi:10.2527/jas.2013-6689. PMID 24663191.
