= Mark Wentworth Dunham =

Historic house in Illinois, United States

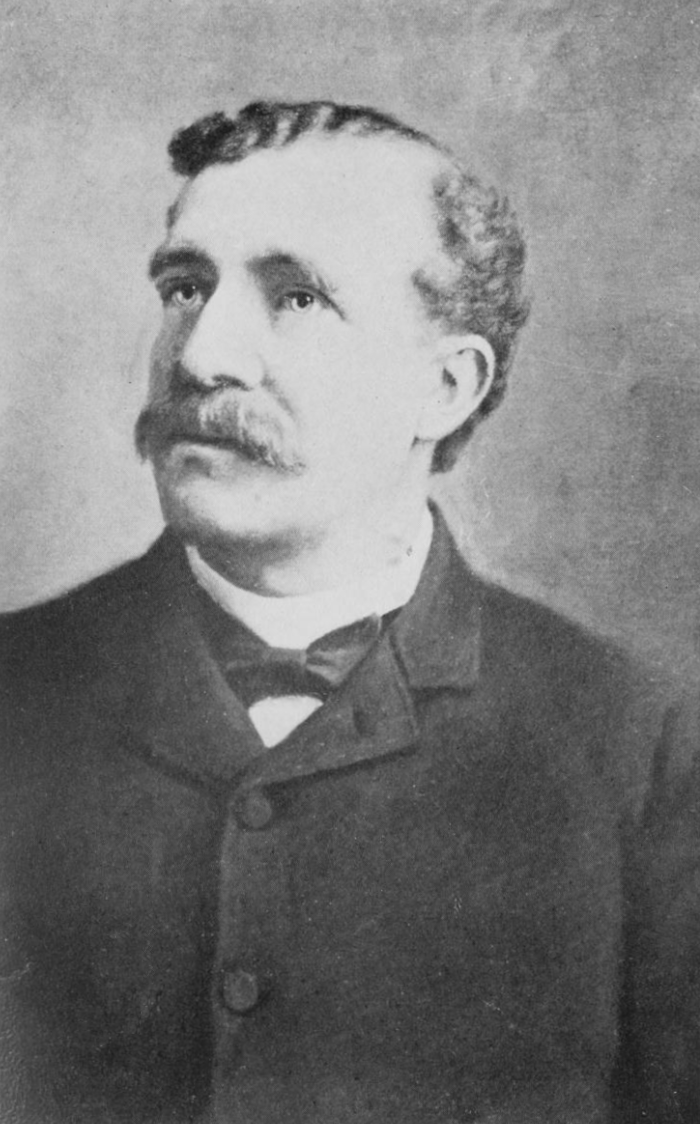
- Born: June 22, 1842; Wayne, Illinois
- Died: February 11, 1899 (aged 56); Chicago, Illinois
- Occupation(s): Horse breeder, importer

Mark Wentworth Dunham (1842–1899) was an American importer and breeder of horses and the owner of the Oaklawn Farm in Wayne, Illinois, which was at one time the largest horse breeding farm in the world.

== Life ==
Mark W. Dunham was born in Wayne, Illinois on June 22, 1842, the son of Solomon Dunham (1791–1856). The elder Dunham had emigrated from New York State in a covered wagon to settle on 400 acres of land in Illinois, where he strategically built roads, an inn, a general store, and a house in order to prosper from the construction of new railroad lines passing through the area. Solomon, a Democrat, was the first County Commissioner and the first Assessor in Kane County, Illinois. Solomon died in 1865, bequeathing 300 acres to his youngest son Mark.

Mark W. Dunham and his brother Daniel Dunham, the oldest of the siblings, were pioneers in the introduction of the French coach horse, and especially well known as importers of the Percheron breed of draft horses into the United States. In 1875 Mark Wentworth Dunham purchased the Percheron horse "Success" for $3,300, an impressive sum at the time, and launched the horse breeding business. These large French draft horses proved to be excellent in pulling farm equipment before the invention of the power tractor and other farm machinery. To sell the horses, Dunham issued a catalog to prospective clients, some with illustrations by Rosa Bonheur. Through Dunham's legendary business acumen the size of the farm eventually expanded to 2,000 acres and the breeding business flourished until the early decades of the 20th century, earning Dunham vast sums of money and the gratitude of both the French and American people. By 1888 an estimated one-fifth of all imported French horses lived at Oaklawn.

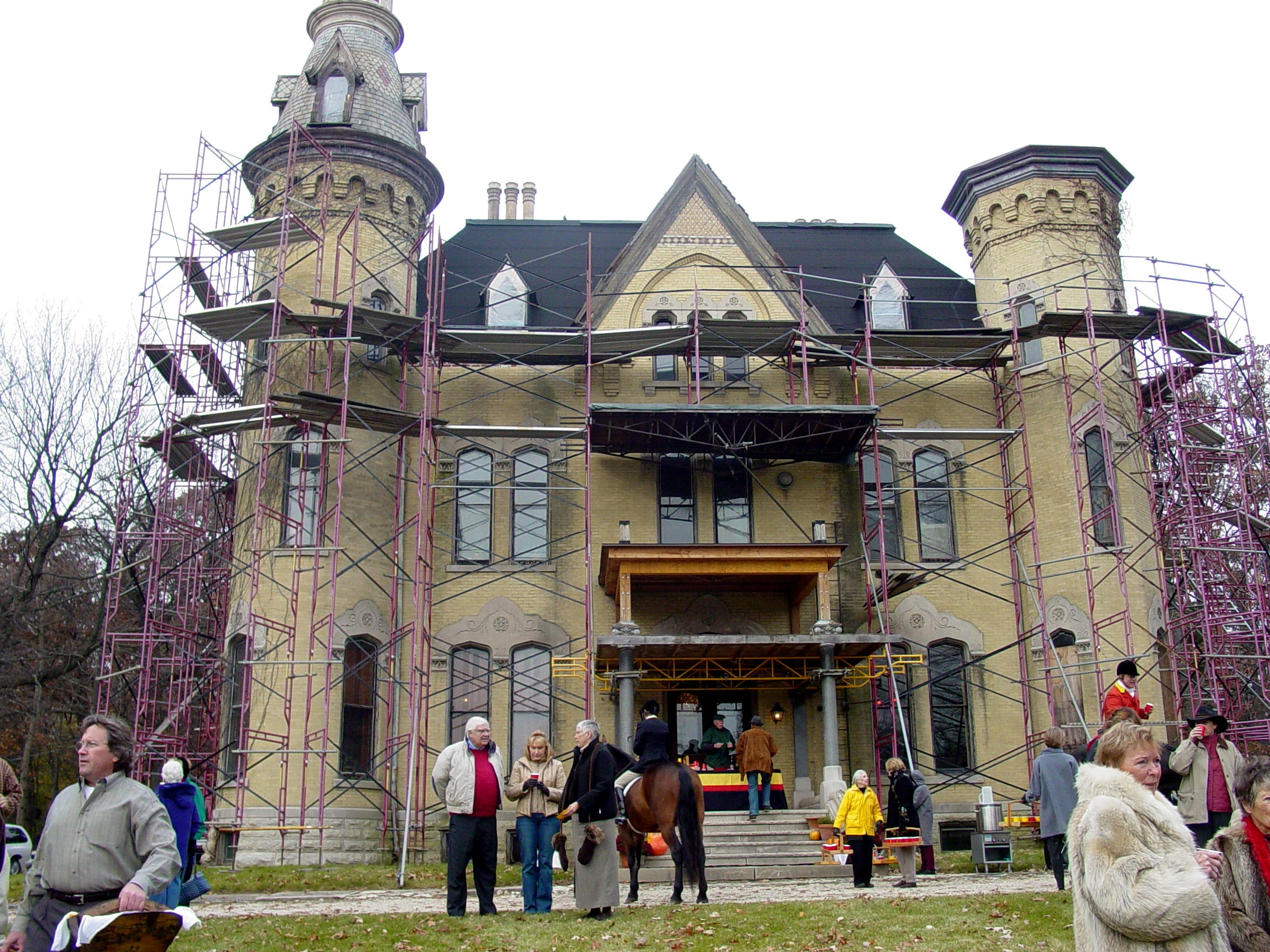
Dunham Castle, Oaklawn Farm, Wayne, Illinois

By 1883, the Dunham Castle, which was patterned after the Normandy chateaus he had seen while on stock buying trips in France, was completed and served as the family residence. During the 1893 Chicago World's Fair a train from Chicago to Wayne brought guests to see the Percheron horses. Those that made the trip included Cyrus McCormick, George Pullman, the Duke of Veragua, Daniel Burnham, Marshall Field, and Carter Harrison, Sr. In the early 20th century, the residence served as a retreat for such politicians as Adlai Stevenson and Everett Dirksen.

== Death and legacy ==
Mark W. Dunham died at Mercy Hospital in Chicago on February 11, 1899, reportedly of blood poisoning after inspecting an infected hoof. His New York Times obituary on February 12, 1899, named Dunham as "the most extensive breeder of pure-bred horses in the world… he [Dunham] collected in France a lot of mares and stallions that as a whole is conceded to be superior to any similar collection in France. He won with his horses more champion prizes in the show ring than any other breeder has ever won in the history of the show yard in America."

After his death, the then 2,000-acre Oaklawn estate was bequeathed to Dunham's son Wirth Stewart Dunham, who was 21 years old at the time and finishing law school at Harvard. Wirth Dunham married Mary Louise Ward, whose father, Dennis Ward, was the President of City National Bank. During the first World War, Wirth was a captain in the remount section, quartermaster corps, and afterward was a major in the reserve corps. Wirth Dunham was the President of the Horse Association of America and was made a Chevalier Merite Agricole by the French Government.

In the early 20th century, farm machinery dramatically reduced the need for draft horses and Oaklawn ceased operations in 1929. The Dunham Woods Riding Club was established in 1934. Parts of the original property were listed on the National Register of Historic Places in 1979.

== Other notables ==
In 1910, Louise Powis Clark (1887–1965) (a granddaughter of Solomon Dunham's eldest son Daniel), and her husband Elwood Brown traveled to Manila, Philippines with the Y.M.C.A. While there, Mrs. Brown became impressed by the beautiful embroidery done by the native women. As an experiment, she designed an embroidery pattern for a nightgown and commissioned local artisans to produce it. With the help of her mother, Mrs. Julia Dunham Powis of Wayne, the production of this attire eventually developed into a million dollar business, and moved its headquarters from the family home, "Grove Place," to New York City. The mother-daughter team sold their interest in the company after Mr. Brown's death in 1929. Some years later Louise married Owen D. Young, chairman of General Electric.

== See also ==
- Brillant 755
