= Wayne, Illinois =

- Village
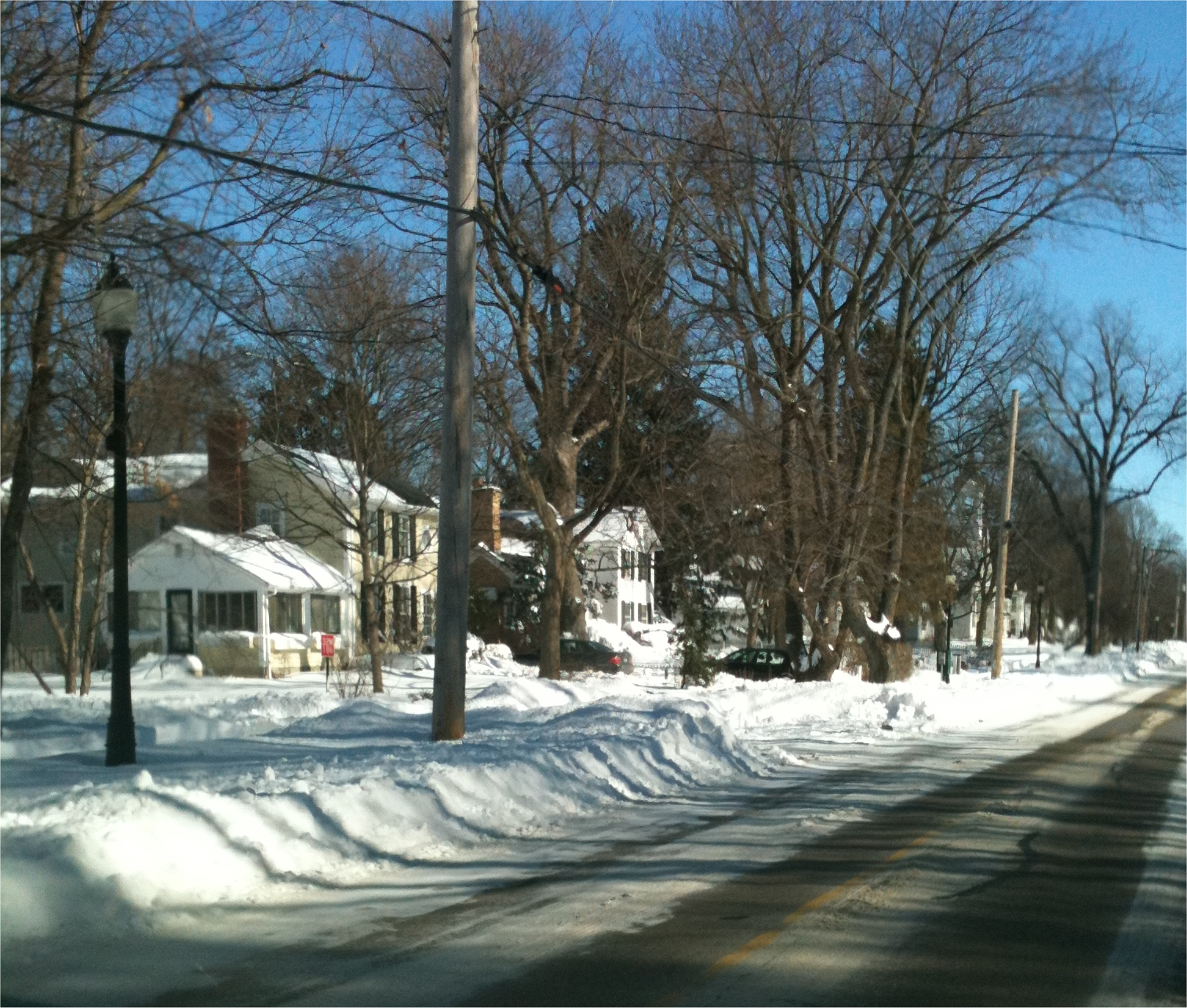
- Housing along Army Trail Road in Wayne, Illinois. Looking east about 50 feet east of Railroad Street in February 2011

- Location of Wayne in DuPage and Kane Counties, Illinois.
- Coordinates: 41°56′48″N 88°14′30″W
- Country: United States
- State: Illinois
- Counties: DuPage, Kane
- Townships: St. Charles, Wayne
- Founded: 1958

Government
  - Village President: Eileen Phipps
  - Village Board of Trustees: Gaetano "Guy" Bevente, Pete Connolly, Mike Dimitroff, Ed Hull, Karen Kaluzsa, Emily Miller
  - Village Treasurer: Howard Levine
  - Village Clerk: Patricia Engstrom
  - Chief of Police: Tim Roberts

Area
  - Total: 5.82 sq mi (15.08 km^{2})
  - Land: 5.73 sq mi (14.84 km^{2})
  - Water: 0.093 sq mi (0.24 km^{2})
- Elevation: 742 ft (226 m)

Population (2020)
  - Total: 2,286
  - Density: 399.0/sq mi (154.04/km^{2})
- Time zone: UTC-6 (CST)
  - Summer (DST): UTC-5 (CDT)
- ZIP code: 60184
- Area codes: 630 & 331
- FIPS code: 17-79397
- GNIS feature ID: 2400112
- Website: villageofwayne.org

Wayne is a village in DuPage and Kane counties, Illinois, United States. The eastern portion, in DuPage County, is in Wayne Township, while the western portion, in Kane County, is in St. Charles Township. The population was 2,286 as of the 2020 census.

In the late 19th and early 20th century, Wayne was a prominent center of horse breeding and farming research. The community, situated in a small, rural valley, was known for breeding French Percheron horses, a draught horse similar to a Clydesdale. Wayne was founded in the 1800s at the same time as the similarly named Wayne Center. Wayne Center was located on Army Trail Road at DuPage River crossing and no longer exists. "Downtown" Wayne was originally a railroad outpost built along Glos Street and Army Trail Road. The village is much smaller than the cities that surround it. This is partially due to the native Oak savanna landscape between the DuPage and Fox rivers, with Tallgrass prairies that retain a large amount of water in the spring season. The village is surrounded by these prairies on three sides, and has taken steps to maintain them in their natural state.

== History ==
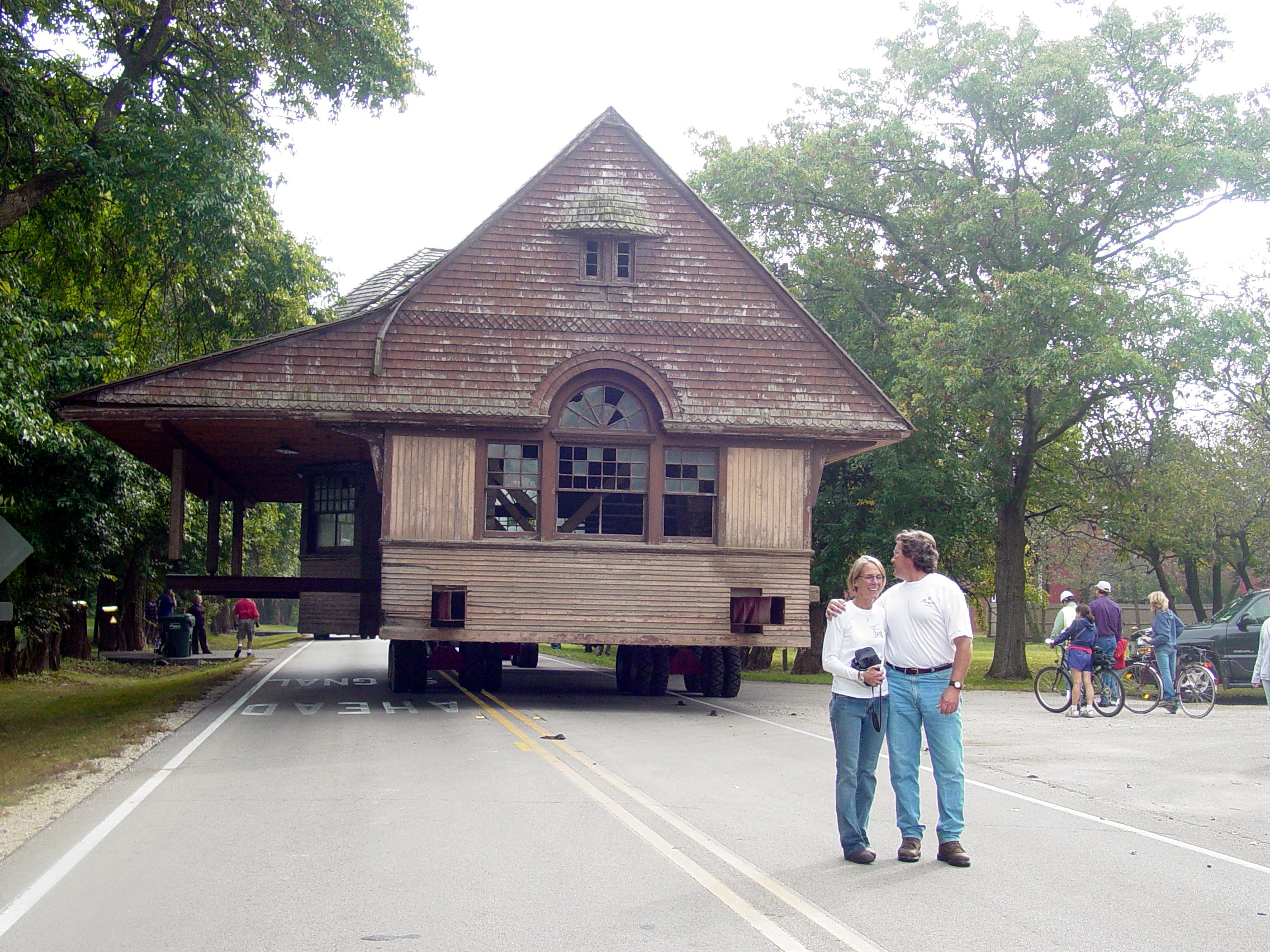
Depot during move in 2007. Eastbound on Army Trail Road, Wayne, Illinois

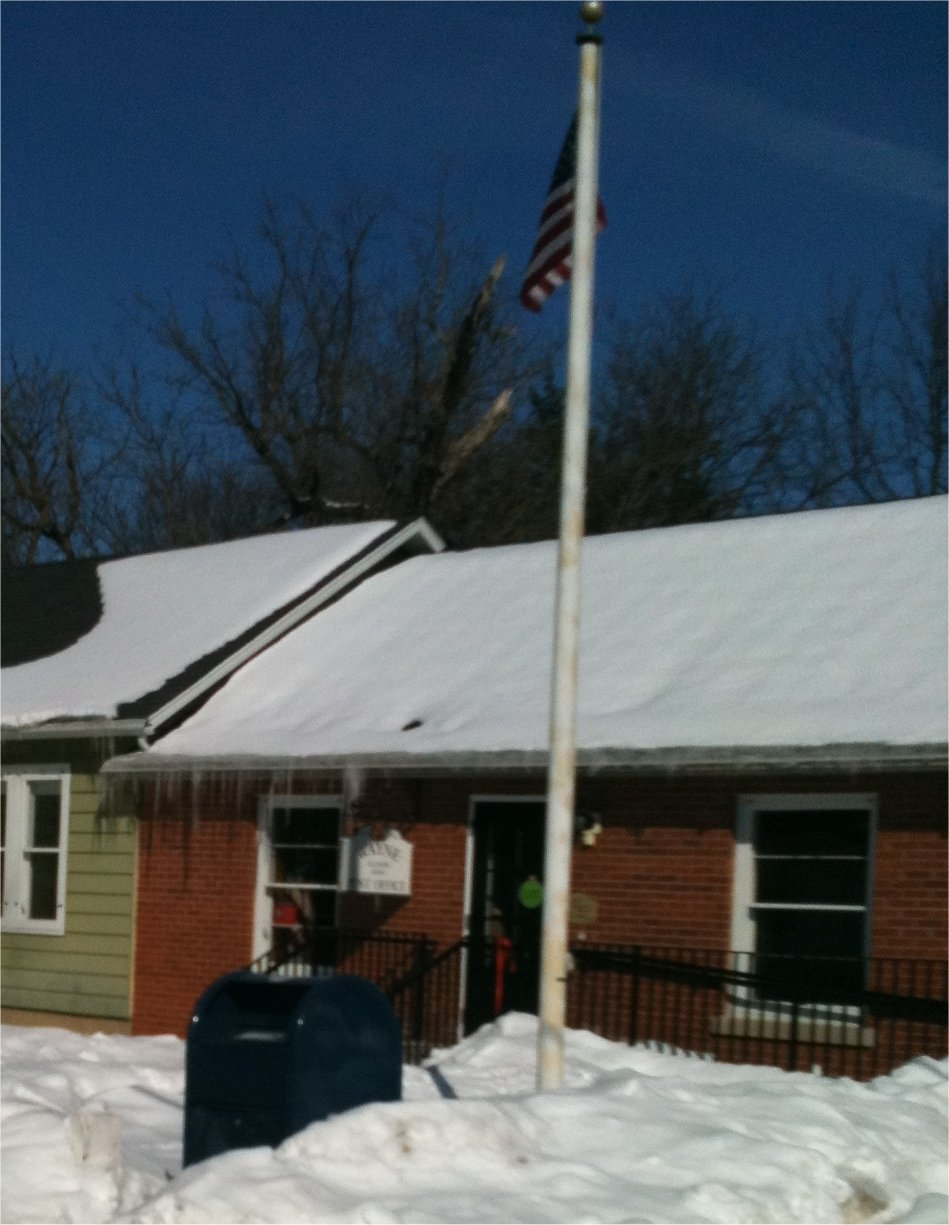
Wayne Illinois Post Office, Zip code 60184, February 2011

Wayne was originally named Wayne Station and was named after Anthony Wayne. Wayne was incorporated in 1958. Previously, the community was administered as a private association called the "Wayne Community Association" with voluntary contributions funding village services including police.

Since World War II, Wayne has grown steadily, adding subdivisions near Illinois Route 59, off Munger Road, near Smith Road, near Dunham Castle at Army Trail Road, along Powis Road, and filling in throughout the Village. For work, residents are primarily commuters to Chicago via railroad stations in Geneva, Bartlett, or West Chicago or drive to Chicago or other suburbs particularly in Kane, DuPage, Lake, Cook, or McHenry County.

In October 2007, the historic Chicago and Northwestern railway station was relocated from Dunham Castle to the Chicago and Northwestern Railroad (now Union Pacific) tracks at Army Trail Road. The station was originally at that location, but moved to Dunham Castle during the 1940s or 1950s; the old station was converted to a horse stable. Through grants and contributions from Dunham Castle's owners, the station was moved back to its original location and is currently being restored. This building is locally called "The Depot". Additional railroad buildings were relocated to private property in the Village including one station building about ½ mile west of Munger Road on Army Trail Road.

=== Oaklawn Farm and Dunham Castle ===
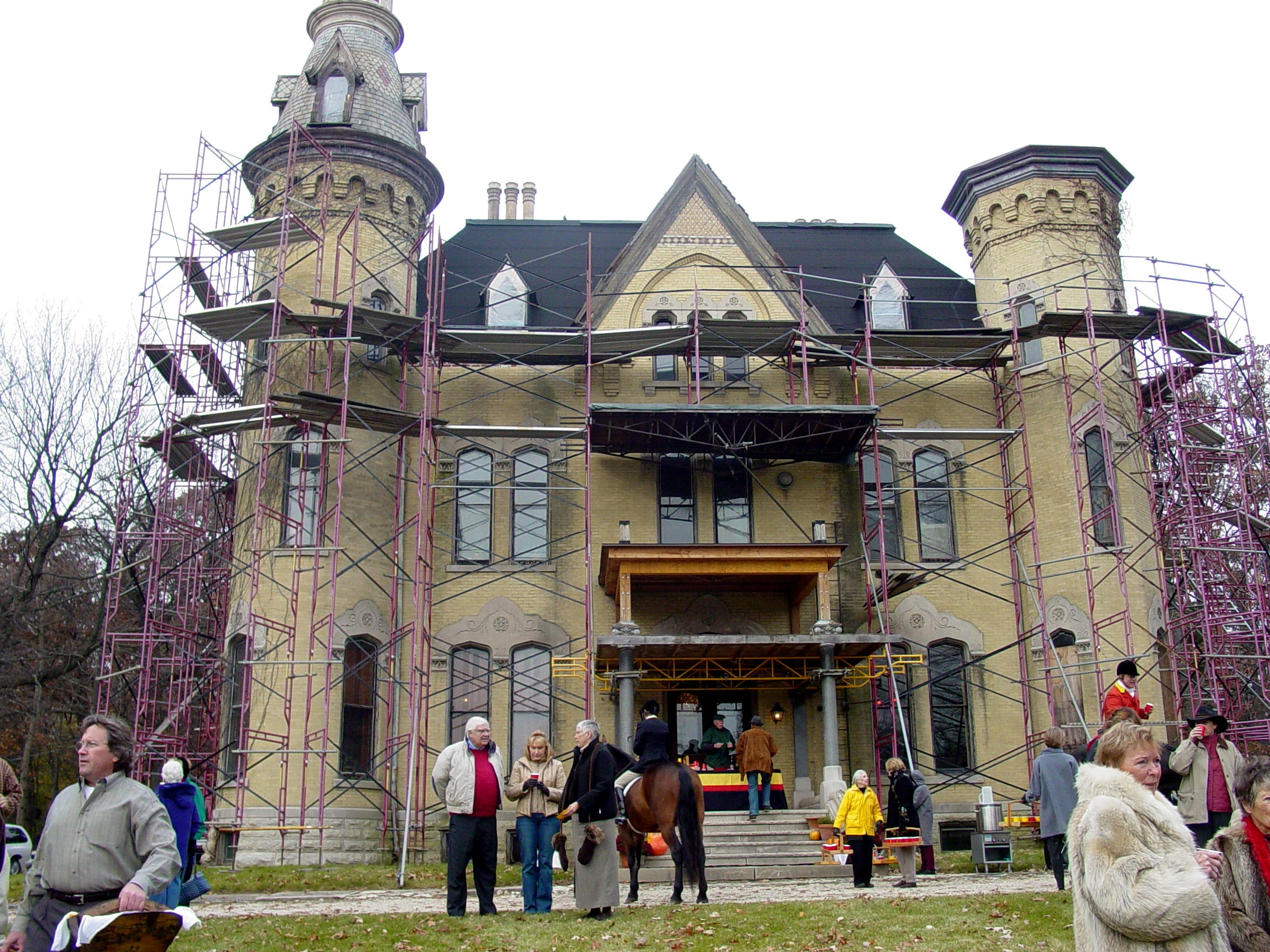
Dunham Castle, November 2006 during Stirrup Cup Celebration.

Wayne's primary landmark is the Dunham Castle, originally built between 1878 and 1882. The stone structure, complete with turret, was inspired by a Norman castle and was built by one of Wayne's first pioneers, Mark Dunham, a Percheron horse breeder. Assisting Mark in the design was architect Smith Hoag of Elgin, Illinois.

Mark Dunham's horse farm, Oaklawn Farm, founded in Wayne in 1866, was one of the earliest Percheron breeding farms in the U.S.; Dunham is known as the "Father of the Percheron in North America". During the 1893 World's Columbian Exposition, a train from Chicago to Wayne brought guests to see the Percheron horses at the 2,000 acres (8.1 km^{2}) farm. Those that made the trip included Cyrus McCormick, George Pullman, and the Duke of Veragua.

At the height of the Percheron business, Dunham built a house, now called Dunham Castle, near the farm, on the northwest corner of Army Trail Road and Dunham Road. The Dunhams based the idea for the design of their new home on that of French chateaux. The building, of brick, and stone, with different colored slate roofing, stands surrounded by woods, gardens, and a gently sloping lawn. The interior has parquet floors, statues, tapestries, and copies of fine, French artwork.

In 1899, Wirth Dunham inherited Dunham Castle. He died in 1931. In 1953, Dunham Castle was converted into four spacious apartments. No interior alterations were made that affected the structure. Between 1953 and 1976 there were several owners. In 1976, the Castle was sold to the Griffins family, who looked into making the house a museum, professional office, or private dining club. In 1976, the house was put up for sale.

The castle has been rarely open to public tours, and for charity fund raisers. The house is again privately owned, having been sold in October 2013 and in early 2016 started extensive renovation by its private owner with completion in 2023.

When Mark Dunham finished the construction of Dunham Castle, and made it his primary residence, the original Dunham home evolved into an inn and sales pavilion for the Dunham family's Oaklawn Farm. However, Percheron horse demand declined steadily as gas-powered cars, trucks, and farm implements grew in popularity, finally making Percherons a novelty or parade horse, and Oaklawn Farm ceased operation as a commercial enterprise. The offices of Dunham's farm, then popularly known as the “Inn”, are well-preserved, now home to Wayne's only dining establishment and social club, the Dunham Woods Riding Club.

=== Dunham Woods Riding Club ===
The Dunham Woods Riding Club was founded in 1934 by a group of Wayne and Geneva residents who leased the original Dunham family home. A fire destroyed the original old coach house in 1950 and the proceeds of the insurance were utilized by the club to purchase the Inn, the Lower Barn, swimming pool, tennis courts, and surrounding land. The Gray Room ballroom, Formal Dining Room and a new kitchen were added in 1957.

In 1961, the Wayne-DuPage Hunt was instrumental in purchasing more land from Dunham's Inc., including the Kennels and Upper Barn. This purchase was made in the name of the Dunham Woods Riding Club. Additional land was purchased in 1975, which included the outdoor riding rings, indoor riding ring, outside cross-country course, tenant house, and new pole barn all of which are leased to the Hunt by the club.

In 1979, the four corners comprising the intersection of Army Trail and Dunham Roads, The Dunham Woods Riding Club and Dunham Castle, together with the additional surrounding land and outbuildings were accepted into the National Register of Historic Places.

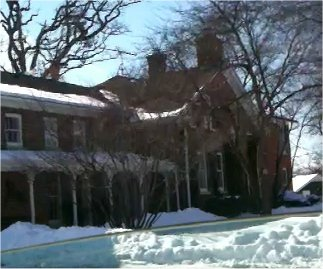
Dunham Woods Riding Club (main entrance), February 2011. Army Trail Road at Dunham Road, southeast corner

== Equestrian traditions ==
The Village of Wayne is committed to preserving its equestrian nature and reputation. The village has miles of equestrian paths, as well as dozens of horse farms, riding centers, and boarding stables. The Wayne-DuPage Hunt, founded in the 1920s, is one of only two fox hunt groups continuing to hunt within metro Chicago, the other being the Mill Creek Hunt in far north Wadsworth. Wayne-DuPage is a drag hunt, not chasing live foxes. The hunt involves kennels for some 60 fox hounds and a membership list of 150, though 80 riders represent a good turnout on a crisp fall weekend. Traditions such as the stirrup cup, sherry or brandy served at the start or finish, and the hunt breakfast, refreshments served at the end, have been preserved. The Wayne-DuPage Hunt Pony Club is a related organization for teaching young people riding, training and horse care.

== Housing ==
Housing in the Village of Wayne varies from small bungalows to multimillion-dollar estates. There are several subdivisions within the Village with house size and value more or less uniform within a given subdivision. Most subdivisions have one to 3-acre (12,000 m^{2}) zoning. Much of the modern housing has been built since the 1970s. Some houses in the Village date to the late 19th century. In DuPage County, a minimum of 2 acres (8,100 m^{2}) is needed to keep horses. In Kane County, property outside of subdivisions must be at least 4 acres (16,000 m^{2}). A property with at least 2 acres (8,100 m^{2}) in either county is locally called "zoned horses" with one horse allowed per acre. Outbuildings are permitted but must follow Village rules that restrict usage generally to horse stables. Architecture varies within the Village but there are several "New England" style homes.

== Flag Day ==
Residents and guests celebrate Flag Day in June each year with a parade and picnic on the Sunday nearest June 14. This parade often features more participants than spectators. The parade begins at Railroad Street at Army Trail Road and is open to all. The parade ends at the Little Home Church 1025¼ feet east. Wayne residents and guests in the church courtyard eat donated cakes and bring picnics. A Jazz band serenades the guests. A Wayne Citizen of the Year, honored for contributions to the village, is traditionally announced at this event. This event is run by the Wayne Community Association in conjunction with the Village of Wayne. Until 2005 this event served as the annual meeting of the Wayne Community Association.

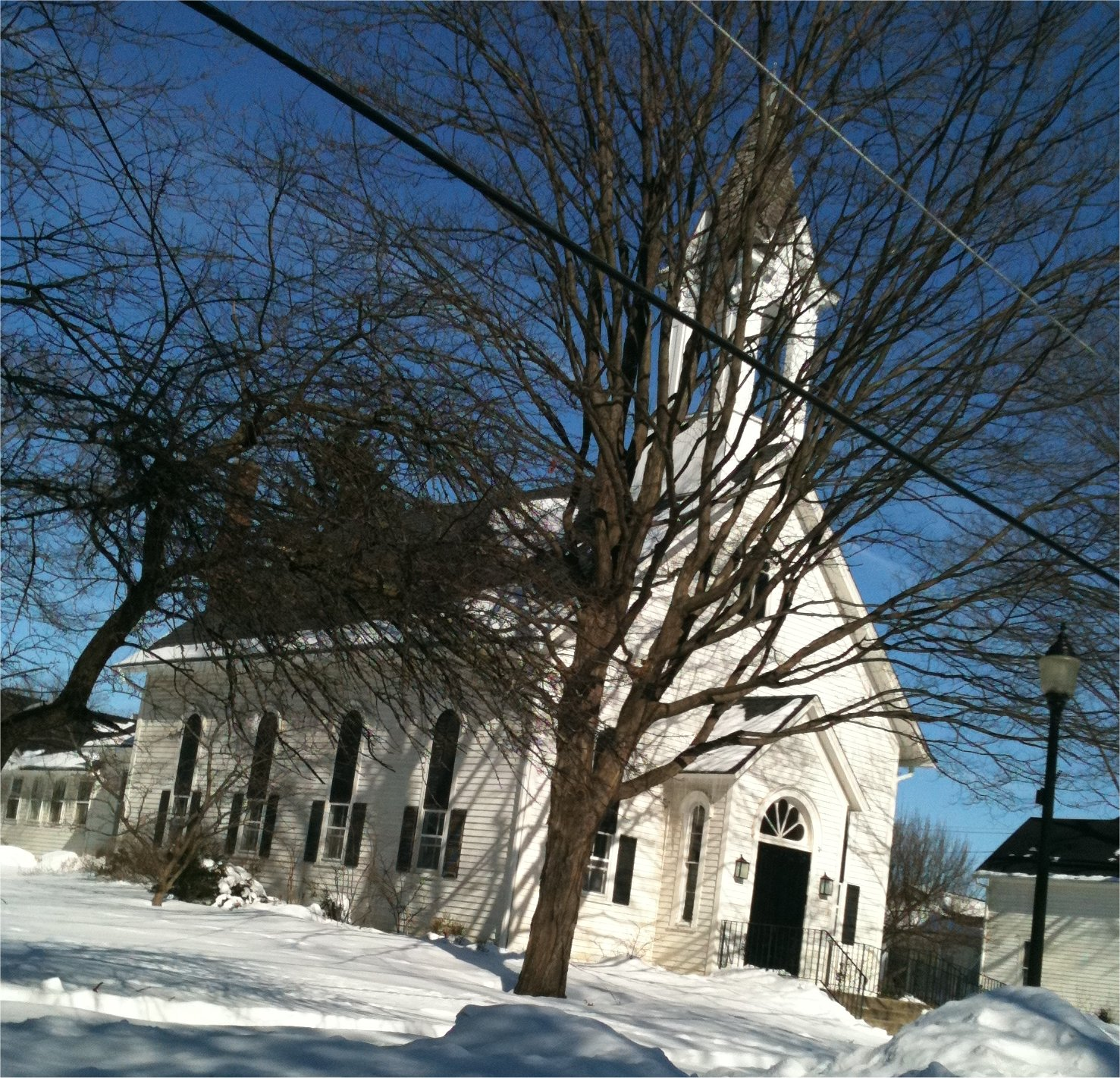
Little Home Church, Wayne, Illinois. Army Trail Road at School Street, February 2011

== Wayne Day and other gatherings ==
Residents and guests celebrate Wayne Day around the first Saturday in October each year in the fields east of the Dunham Club with a kite flying, picnic, and evening bonfire. Started around 1997, this annual event highlights community organizations, local politicians, and historic exhibits. This event is run by community organizations in conjunction with the Village of Wayne. The 2009 event commemorated the 175th anniversary of the founding of Wayne.

In addition, other events have been held to raise funds for the Wayne Police Department, including a 2017 "Wayne Wine and Horse Fest" fundraising event that drew over 1,200 area people and raised over $42,000 for the Wayne Police Department. Subsequent "Wayne Wine and Horse Fest" events have been held and raised additional funding for the Wayne Police Department.

The Village of Wayne started hosting an annual Christmas Tree lighting by the Old Depot building in 2021.

== Notable people ==
- Mark Wentworth Dunham (1842–1899), American importer and breeder of horses and the owner of the Oaklawn Farm.
- Marguerite Henry (1902–1997), author. She lived in Wayne.
- George C. Marshall (1880–1959), U.S. Army Chief of Staff, Secretary of State, Secretary of Defense, and Nobel Peace Prize winner. He resided in Wayne in 1935-1936 while assigned to serve as senior instructor for the Illinois National Guard.
- Joy Morton (1855–1934), founder of Morton Salt; president of Dunham Woods in the 1930s.
- Greg Zito (1953–2025), member of the Illinois General Assembly from 1981 to 1993. He moved to Wayne after his legislative career ended.

== Pratt’s Wayne Woods ==
Wayne contains a large forest preserve. Pratt's Wayne Woods is the largest forest preserve in DuPage County. Located in the county's northwest corner, the preserve's 3,462 acres (14.01 km^{2}) combine with Illinois Department of Natural Resource land adjacent on the north to form a continuous 4,000 acres (16 km^{2}) stretch of land, a scarce resource in a growing urban area. The savannas, marshes, meadows and wetlands of Pratt's Wayne Woods offer a myriad of nature-loving opportunities and recreational excursions. The preserve's Brewster Creek area is the site of a major wetland restoration program.

The area now known as Pratt's Wayne Woods first took form in 1965 with a donation of 160 acres (0.65 km^{2}) by the state of Illinois. Thanks to the efforts of George Pratt, a township supervisor and a preserve commissioner during the 1960s and 1970s, the Forest Preserve District began to purchase additional lands that comprise Pratt's Wayne Woods today.

The first private land owner of this area was Mark Wentworth Fletcher, a surveyor who made his living in Geneva, Dundee, Elgin, St. Charles and Wayne. Fletcher purchased 320 acres (1.3 km^{2}) from the federal government on February 18, 1846, and built a farmhouse along Dunham Road.

After Fletcher's death in 1900, the land changed ownership a few times before Mark Morton purchased it in 1926. One of the founders of the Morton Salt Company, Morton excavated the farm's southwest corner for sand and gravel. Land that was not used in the mineral operations was farmed for grain and corn up until a few years before Morton's death in 1951.

The land was later purchased by Franz Palm, who transformed the area into a sportsman's hunting and fishing lodge. The Palm family had originally intended their park to be their retirement place; however, the state of Illinois had other plans. The state purchased the original 320 acres (1.3 km^{2}) with the intention of creating a state park. Once this idea was abandoned, George Pratt convinced the District to purchase the quarry area for a forest preserve. In 1974, Pratt expanded the preserve by selling his adjacent 250 acres (1.0 km^{2}) Maple Spring Farm to the District.

Since the early 20th century, the complex of wetlands in Pratt's Wayne Woods’ Brewster Creek area have been artificially drained by a system of buried clay pipes. The Forest Preserve District is now removing these drain tiles to restore this vital habitat, which over the years has become home to several threatened and endangered plant and animal species.

In 1990, plans to form DuPage County's only state park were revived when the state and the Forest Preserve District purchased more than 300 acres (1.2 km^{2}) in the area of Pratt's Wayne Woods for that purpose. James "Pate" Philip State Park is located just north of Pratt's Wayne Woods. A 24,000 square foot (2,200 m^{2}) visitors center that also houses the Illinois Department of Natural Resources’ Region 2 headquarters opened in April 2003.

In 2004, an area east of Honey Hill Road and south of Army Trail Road was purchased by the DuPage Forest Preserve District from Oliver-Hoffman Corporation. This area, still under park development by Dupage Forest Preserve in 2016, is known as Dunham Woods and is adjacent to portions of Pratts Wayne Woods in its southeast section.

== Geography ==
According to the 2021 census gazetteer files, Wayne has a total area of 5.82 square miles (15.07 km^{2}), of which 5.73 square miles (14.84 km^{2}) (or 98.40%) is land and 0.09 square miles (0.23 km^{2}) (or 1.60%) is water. Wayne is dotted by small streams, wetlands, and small ponds.

== Demographics ==
Historical population
Census	Pop.	Note	%±
1960	373		—
1970	572		53.4%
1980	940		64.3%
1990	1,541		63.9%
2000	2,137		38.7%
2010	2,431		13.8%
2020	2,286		−6.0%
U.S. Decennial Census

=== Racial and ethnic composition ===
Wayne village, Illinois – Racial and ethnic composition Note: the US Census treats Hispanic/Latino as an ethnic category. This table excludes Latinos from the racial categories and assigns them to a separate category. Hispanics/Latinos may be of any race.
Race / Ethnicity (NH = Non-Hispanic)	Pop 2000	Pop 2010	Pop 2020	% 2000	% 2010	% 2020
White alone (NH)	1,966	2,213	1,861	92.00%	91.03%	81.41%
Black or African American alone (NH)	8	21	15	0.37%	0.86%	0.66%
Native American or Alaska Native alone (NH)	1	1	2	0.05%	0.04%	0.09%
Asian alone (NH)	60	81	167	2.81%	3.33%	7.31%
Pacific Islander alone (NH)	0	5	0	0.00%	0.21%	0.00%
Other race alone (NH)	0	1	11	0.00%	0.04%	0.48%
Mixed race or Multiracial (NH)	22	19	47	1.03%	0.78%	2.06%
Hispanic or Latino (any race)	80	90	183	3.74%	3.70%	8.01%
Total	2,137	2,431	2,286	100.00%	100.00%	100.00%

=== 2020 census ===
As of the 2020 census, Wayne had a population of 2,286. The median age was 50.7 years. 18.1% of residents were under the age of 18 and 21.5% of residents were 65 years of age or older. For every 100 females there were 97.9 males, and for every 100 females age 18 and over there were 99.4 males age 18 and over.

62.9% of residents lived in urban areas, while 37.1% lived in rural areas.

There were 827 households in Wayne, including 695 families, of which 27.1% had children under the age of 18 living in them. Of all households, 73.0% were married-couple households, 9.7% were households with a male householder and no spouse or partner present, and 13.4% were households with a female householder and no spouse or partner present. About 15.2% of all households were made up of individuals and 8.3% had someone living alone who was 65 years of age or older. The average household size was 3.18 and the average family size was 2.79.

There were 890 housing units, of which 7.1% were vacant. The homeowner vacancy rate was 2.6% and the rental vacancy rate was 2.6%.

The population density was 392.58 inhabitants per square mile (151.58/km^{2}), and the housing unit density was 152.84 per square mile (59.01/km^{2}).

=== Income and poverty ===
The median income for a household in the village was $132,695, and the median income for a family was $150,568. Males had a median income of $88,514 versus $40,069 for females. The per capita income for the village was $61,007. About 1.2% of families and 1.0% of the population were below the poverty line, including none of those under age 18 and 1.3% of those age 65 or over.

== Education ==
The village is served by St. Charles District 303 in its south and west portions and by Elgin Area School District U-46 in its central, north, and east portions. U-46 serves an area of some 90 square miles (230 km^{2}) in Cook, DuPage and Kane Counties. Almost 40,000 children of school age are in its area. U-46 is second largest school district in Illinois. Wayne has its own elementary school, Wayne Elementary, part of U-46, serving around 375 children in grades K-6 from Wayne and surrounding communities.

== Sister city ==
Nogent-le-Rotrou, France.
