= Oaklawn Farm =

- U.S. National Register of Historic Places
- U.S. Historic district
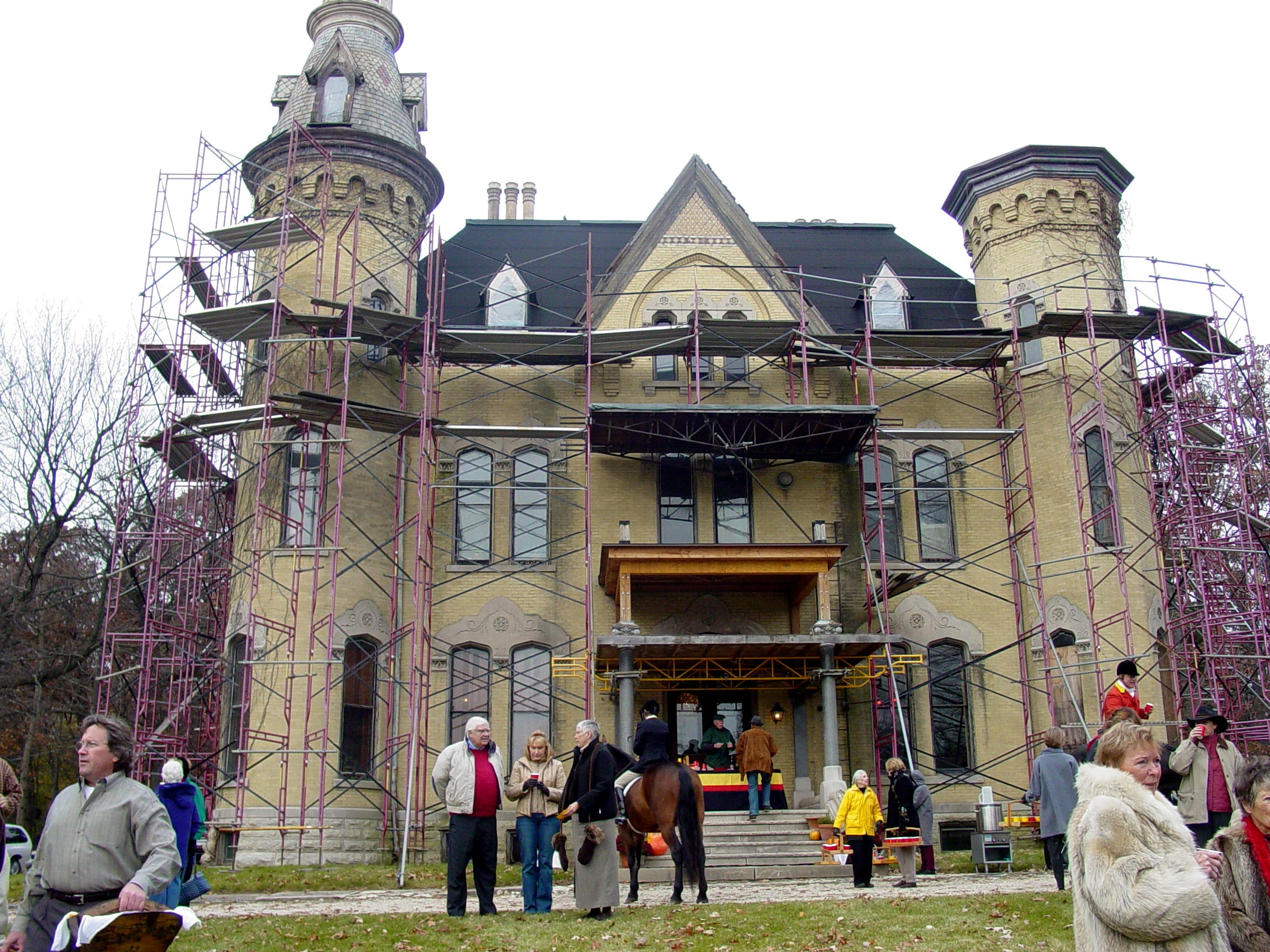
- Dunham Castle at Oaklawn Farm, pictured during restoration efforts in 2009.

- Location within Illinois Location within the United States
- Location: Army Trail and Dunham Rds., Wayne, Illinois
- Coordinates: 41°57′2″N 88°16′10″W
- Area: 56 acres (23 ha)
- Architectural style: Greek Revival, Renaissance, Chateauesque
- NRHP reference No.: 79000848
- Added to NRHP: July 26, 1979

Oaklawn Farm is a historic property in Wayne, Illinois. The farm was operated by the Dunham family, who successfully bred Percheron horses. The property features the chateauesque Dunham Castle, which was built by Mark Wentworth Dunham in 1880. Nine other buildings from the time period still stand on the property, which is still used as the Dunham Woods Riding Club. The farm was recognized by the National Park Service as a Historic Place in 1979.

== History ==
The property that would become Oaklawn Farm was first settled in 1835. In 1865, Mark W. Dunham purchased the land and built his own house on it. Three years later, Dunham organized the Fletcher Norman Horse Company with his uncle and a group of local farmers. They intended to raise Percheron horses as studs. They bought two stallions from Perche, one of which (Success) became the most notable Percheron breeder of all time. Dunham worked tirelessly to perfect his breed of horses, traveling to France to learn from other breeders. He imported over 1,300 horses from the country by 1883. Oaklawn Farm was soon internationally recognized as an important breeding establishment. In 1888, it was estimated that one-fifth of all imported French horses lived at Oaklawn. Dunham issued a catalog to prospective clients, some with illustrations by Rosa Bonheur. Agricultural exhibitors from the World's Columbian Exposition tested out machinery on the property, so the farm was visited by many famous names, including Daniel Burnham, Marshall Field, and Carter Harrison, Sr. In the early 20th century, farm machinery dramatically reduced the need for draft horses. Oaklawn ceased operations in 1929, and the Dunham family sold much of the property. The remaining portions of the part were listed on the National Register of Historic Places on July 26, 1979.

== Architecture ==
Today, the farm occupies all four corners of the intersection of Army Trail and Dunham Roads in Wayne, Illinois. The original farm was over 1,700 acres (690 ha), but presently the property occupies only 56 acres (23 ha). The southeast corner still functions as a horseback riding club. The Oaklawn Farm Historic District contains 11 buildings, all but one of which were in operation before the 1929 liquidation. Five buildings are considered to be of great significance to the site, two have significant significance, three have little significance, and one is an intrusion.

By 1880, Mark Dunham had become fabulously wealthy, and decided to build a mansion on his property. Dunham wanted to integrate French chateau designs with modern American architectural trends. The house, now known as Dunham Castle, is on the northwest corner of the property. The interior had been converted into apartments and then back to a private residence, but the exterior remains intact. Dunham himself designed the building with some help from Elgin builder Smith Hoag. The house is 70 by 100 feet (21 m × 30 m) and stands two-and-a-half stories tall. The brick was imported from Racine, Wisconsin and sits on a foundation of Batavia stone. The northeast corner featured an octagonal tower, while a round tower adorns the southeast corner. The center of the main (eastern) exposure features a gable with three arched windows. Each of the main floors on the east has three pairs of windows with decorative lintels, although the main entrance takes the place of the central pair on the first floor. The roof is steep with patterned tile. Although the exterior has been well preserved since its 1883 construction, the interior has been completely remodeled.

A house on the southeast side of the property dates to the late 1870s that was used as a residence for the family coachman. It is probably that Mark Dunham used this as his residence before Dunham Castle was completed. The house is one-and-a-half stories with Gothic and Neo-Renaissance influences.

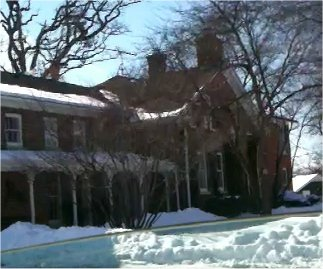
The former Solomon Dunham House is now used for the Dunham Woods Riding Club.

The Dunham Woods Riding Club building was formerly in use as the Solomon Dunham House. Solomon was Mark Dunham's father, who was a pioneer of the region after arriving from New York in 1835. Solomon was a county assessor and was the first person to survey Kane County. This information was useful when the Galena and Chicago Union Railroad was constructed in 1851. Solomon built a train station for the line in Wayne, as well as a house, store and inn. This made him the founder of the village. He retired from public life in 1857, transferring his responsibilities to his son, Mark. Solomon's house was built in 1836 in an L-shaped pattern in the rural Greek Revival style. The 1 1/2-story building received a large addition by Mark Dunham in 1884 on the west side; Mark used it as the Oaklawn Farm office. In 1935, the Dunham Woods Riding Club was founded in the former house.

The other two particularly significant buildings are barns used by the Dunham family. Both are on the southeast end of the property. A 133-by-46-foot (41 m × 14 m) horse barn was built around 1884 with loft dormers on the north and south sides. The other barn was also built around 1884, but is much smaller than the horse barn (26 by 60 feet (7.9 m × 18.3 m)). Its original purpose has not been ascertained; it is now used as a realty office.

A long, narrow, frame structure also remains on the property from its days as Oaklawn Farm. Its original purpose is also in question, but it is now used as kennels for the riding club. Some sort of power house or grist mill is on the southeast part of the property. It also dates back to the original farm. Three minor buildings are considered to be of slight significance, and may or may not have been used by the Dunham family. These are a barn, a garage, and an outhouse on the southeast side. A barn on the southeast side is the only building on the property known to have been constructed after 1935.
