= Equine nutrition =

Feeding of domesticated equines such as horses, ponies, mules, and donkeys

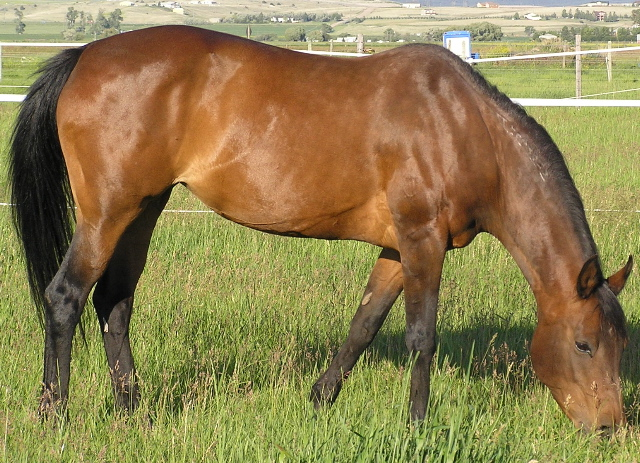
Grass is a natural source of nutrition for a horse.

Equine nutrition is the feeding of horses, ponies, mules, donkeys, and other equines. Correct and balanced nutrition is a critical component of proper horse care.

Horses are non-ruminant herbivores of a type known as a "hindgut fermenter." Horses have only one stomach, as do humans. However, unlike humans, they also need to digest plant fiber (largely cellulose) that comes from grass or hay. Ruminants like cattle are foregut fermenters, and digest fiber in plant matter by use of a multi-chambered stomach, whereas horses use microbial fermentation in the hindgut (cecum and large colon) to break down the cellulose.

In practical terms, horses prefer to eat small amounts of food steadily throughout the day, as they do in nature when grazing on pasture lands. Although this is not always possible with modern stabling practices and human schedules that favor feeding horses twice a day, it is important to remember the underlying biology of the animal when determining what to feed, how often, and in what quantities.

The digestive system of the horse is somewhat delicate. Horses are unable to regurgitate food, except from the esophagus. Thus, if they overeat or eat something poisonous, vomiting is not an option. They also have a long, complex large intestine and a balance of beneficial microbes in their hindgut that can be upset by rapid changes in feed. Because of these factors, they are very susceptible to colic, which is a leading cause of death in horses. Therefore, horses require clean, high-quality feed and water at regular intervals. Horses are also sensitive to molds and toxins. For this reason, they must never be fed contaminated fermentable materials such as lawn clippings. Fermented silage or "haylage" is fed to horses in some places; however, contamination or failure of the fermentation process that allows any mold or spoilage may be toxic.

== The digestive system ==
Horses and other members of the genus Equus are adapted by evolutionary biology to eating small amounts of the same kind of food all day long. In the wild, horses ate prairie grasses in semi-arid regions and traveled significant distances each day in order to obtain adequate nutrition. Therefore, their digestive system was made to work best with a small but steady flow of food that does not change much from day to day.

=== Chewing and swallowing ===
Digestion begins in the mouth. First, the animal selects pieces of forage and picks up finer foods, such as grain, with sensitive, prehensile, lips. The front teeth of the horse, called incisors, nip off forage, and food is ground up for swallowing by the premolars and molars.

The esophagus carries food to the stomach. The esophagus enters the stomach at an acute angle, creating a one-way valve, with a powerful sphincter mechanism at the gastroesophageal junction, which is why horses cannot vomit.

=== The stomach and small intestine ===
Horses have a small stomach for their large size, which limits the amount of food that can be taken in at one time. The average sized horse has a stomach with a capacity of only 4 US gallons (15 L), and works best when it contains about 2 US gallons (7.6 L). One reason continuous foraging or several small feedings per day are better than one or two large meals is because the stomach begins to empty when it is two-thirds full, whether the food in the stomach is processed or not.

The small intestine is 50 to 70 feet (15 to 21 m) long and holds 10 US gallons (38 L) to 12 US gallons (45 L). This is the major digestive organ where 50 to 70 percent of all nutrients are absorbed into the bloodstream. Bile from the liver acts here, combined with enzymes from the pancreas and small intestine itself. Equids do not have a gall bladder, so bile flows constantly, an adaptation to a slow but steady supply of food, and another reason for providing fodder to horses in several small feedings.

=== The cecum and large intestine ===
The cecum is the first section of the large intestine. It is also known as the "water gut" or "hind gut." It is a blind-ended pouch, about 4 feet (1.2 m) long that holds 7 US gallons (26 L) to 8 US gallons (30 L). The small intestine opens into the cecum, and the cellulose plant fiber in the food is fermented by microbes for approximately seven hours. The fermented material leaves the cecum through another orifice and passes to the large colon. The microbes in the cecum produce vitamin K, B-complex vitamins, proteins, and fatty acids. The reason horses must have their diets changed slowly is so the microbes in the cecum are able to modify and adapt to the different chemical structure of new feedstuffs. Too abrupt a change in diet can cause colic, because new materials are not properly digested.

The large colon, small colon, and rectum make up the remainder of the large intestine. The large colon is 10 to 12 feet (3.0 to 3.7 m) long and holds up to 20 US gallons (76 L) of semi-liquid matter. Its main purpose is to absorb carbohydrates which were broken down from cellulose in the cecum. Due to its many twists and turns, it is a common place for a type of horse colic called an impaction. The small colon is also 10 to 12 feet (3.0 to 3.7 m) long, holds about 5 US gallons (19 L), is the area where the majority of water is absorbed, and where fecal balls are formed. The rectum is about one foot long, and acts as a holding chamber for waste, which is then expelled from the body via the anus.

== Nutrients ==
Like all animals, equines require five main classes of nutrients to survive: water, energy (primarily in the form of fats and carbohydrates), proteins, vitamins, and minerals.

=== Water ===
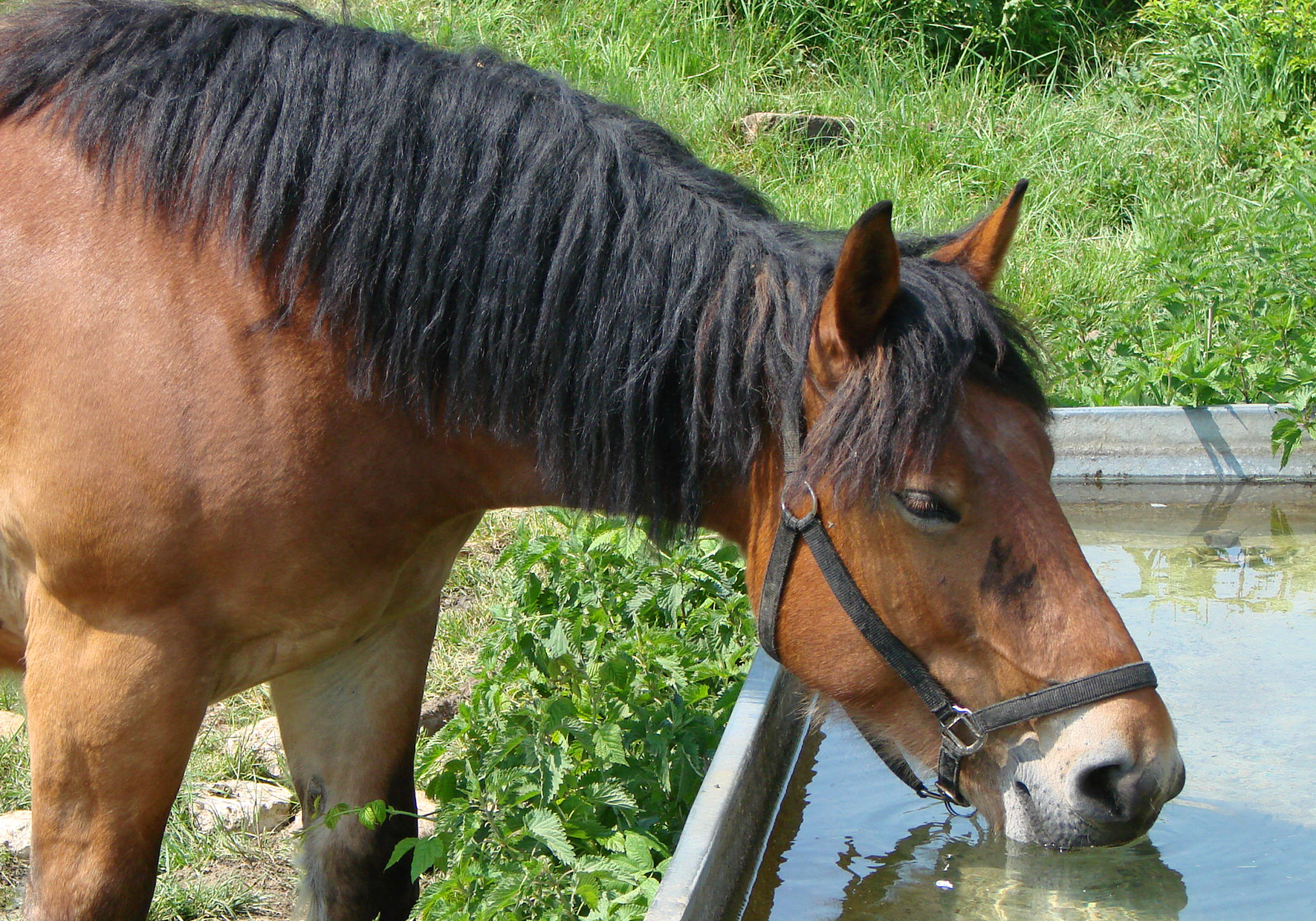
Horses require substantial amounts of clean water every day.

Water makes up between 62-68% of a horse's body weight and is essential for life. Horses can only live a few days without water, becoming dangerously dehydrated if they lose 8-10% of their natural body water.

An average 1,000-pound (450 kg) horse drinks 10 to 12 US gallons (38–45 L) of water per day, more in hot weather, when eating dry forage such as hay, or when consuming high levels of salt, potassium, and magnesium. Horses drink less water in cool weather or when on lush pasture, which has a higher water content. When under hard work, or if a mare is lactating, water requirements may be as much as four times greater than normal. In the winter, snow is not a sufficient source of water for horses. Though they need a great deal of water, horses spend very little time drinking; usually 1–8 minutes a day, spread out in 2-8 episodes.

Water plays an important part in digestion. The forages and grains horses eat are mixed with saliva in the mouth to make a moist bolus that can be easily swallowed. Therefore, horses produce up to 10 US gallons (38 L) or 85 lb. of saliva per day.

=== Energy nutrients and protein ===
Nutritional sources of energy are primarily fat and carbohydrates. Protein is primarily a source of amino acids, which are critical building blocks for muscles and other tissues. Horses that are heavily exercised, growing, pregnant or lactating need both increased energy sources and protein in their diet. However, if a horse has too much energy in its diet and not enough exercise, it can become too high-spirited and difficult to handle, as well as gain excessive weight.

Fat exists in low levels in plants and can be added to increase the energy density of the diet. Fat has 9 megacalories (38 MJ) per kilogram of energy, which is 2.25 times that of any carbohydrate source. Because equids have no gall bladder to store bile, it flows continuously from the liver directly into the small intestine. Fat, though a necessary nutrient, is difficult for them to digest and utilize in large quantities. However, they are able to digest a greater amount of fat than can cattle. Horses can benefit from up to 8% fat in their diets, but more does not always provide a visible benefit. Horses can only have 15-20% fat in their diet without the risk of developing diarrhea.

Carbohydrates, the main energy source in most rations, are usually fed in the form of hay, grass, and grain. Soluble carbohydrates such as starches and sugars are readily broken down to glucose in the small intestine and absorbed. Insoluble carbohydrates, such as fiber (cellulose), are not digested by the horse's own enzymes, but are fermented by microbes in the cecum and large colon to break down and release their energy sources, volatile fatty acids.

Digestible carbohydrates are found in nearly every feed source; corn has the highest amount, with an average starch content of 72%, then barley and oats. Forages normally have only 6-8% soluble carbohydrate, but under certain conditions can have up to 30%. Sudden ingestion of large amounts of starch or high sugar feeds can cause at the least an indigestion colic, and at the worst potentially fatal colitis and/or laminitis.

Protein is used in all parts of the body, especially muscle, blood, hormones, hooves, and hair cells. The main building blocks of protein are amino acids. Alfalfa and other legumes in hay are good sources of protein that can be easily added to the diet. Most adult horses only require 8-10% protein in their diet; however, higher protein is important for lactating mares and young growing foals.

=== Vitamins and minerals ===
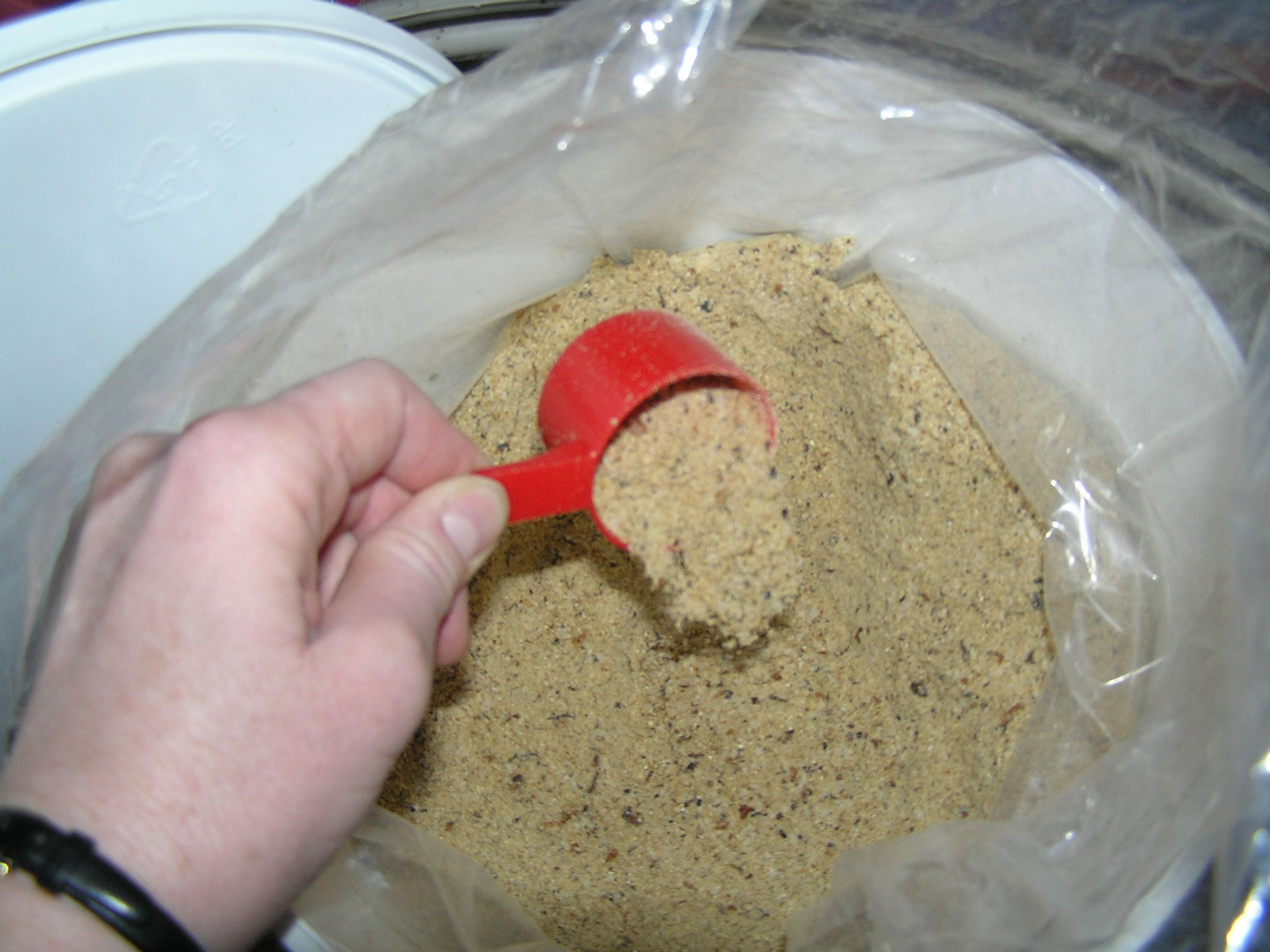
Many commercially prepared vitamin and mineral supplements are available for horses.

Horses that are not subjected to hard work or extreme conditions usually have more than adequate amounts of vitamins in their diet if they are receiving fresh, green, leafy forages. Sometimes a vitamin/mineral supplement is needed when feeding low-quality hay, if a horse is under stress (illness, traveling, showing, racing, and so on), or not eating well. Grain has a different balance of nutrients than forage, and so requires specialized supplementation to prevent an imbalance of vitamins and minerals.

Minerals are required for maintenance and function of the skeleton, nerves, and muscles. These include calcium, phosphorus, sodium, potassium, and chloride, and are commonly found in most good-quality feeds. Horses also need trace minerals such as magnesium, selenium, copper, zinc, and iodine. Normally, if adult animals at maintenance levels are consuming fresh hay or are on pasture, they will receive adequate amounts of minerals in their diet, with the exception of sodium chloride (salt), which needs to be provided, preferably free choice. Some pastures are deficient in certain trace minerals, including selenium, zinc, and copper, and in such situations, health problems, including deficiency diseases, may occur if horses' trace mineral intake is not properly supplemented.

Calcium and phosphorus are needed in a specific ratio of between 1:1 and 2:1. Adult horses can tolerate up to a 5:1 ratio, foals no more than 3:1. A total ration with a higher ratio of phosphorus than calcium is to be avoided. Over time, imbalance will ultimately lead to a number of possible bone-related problems such as osteoporosis.

Foals and young growing horses through their first three to four years have special nutritional needs and require feeds that are balanced with a proper calcium:phosphorus ratio and other trace minerals. A number of skeletal problems may occur in young animals with an unbalanced diet. Hard work increases the need for minerals; sweating depletes sodium, potassium, and chloride from the horse's system. Therefore, supplementation with electrolytes may be required for horses in intense training, especially in hot weather.

== Types of feed ==
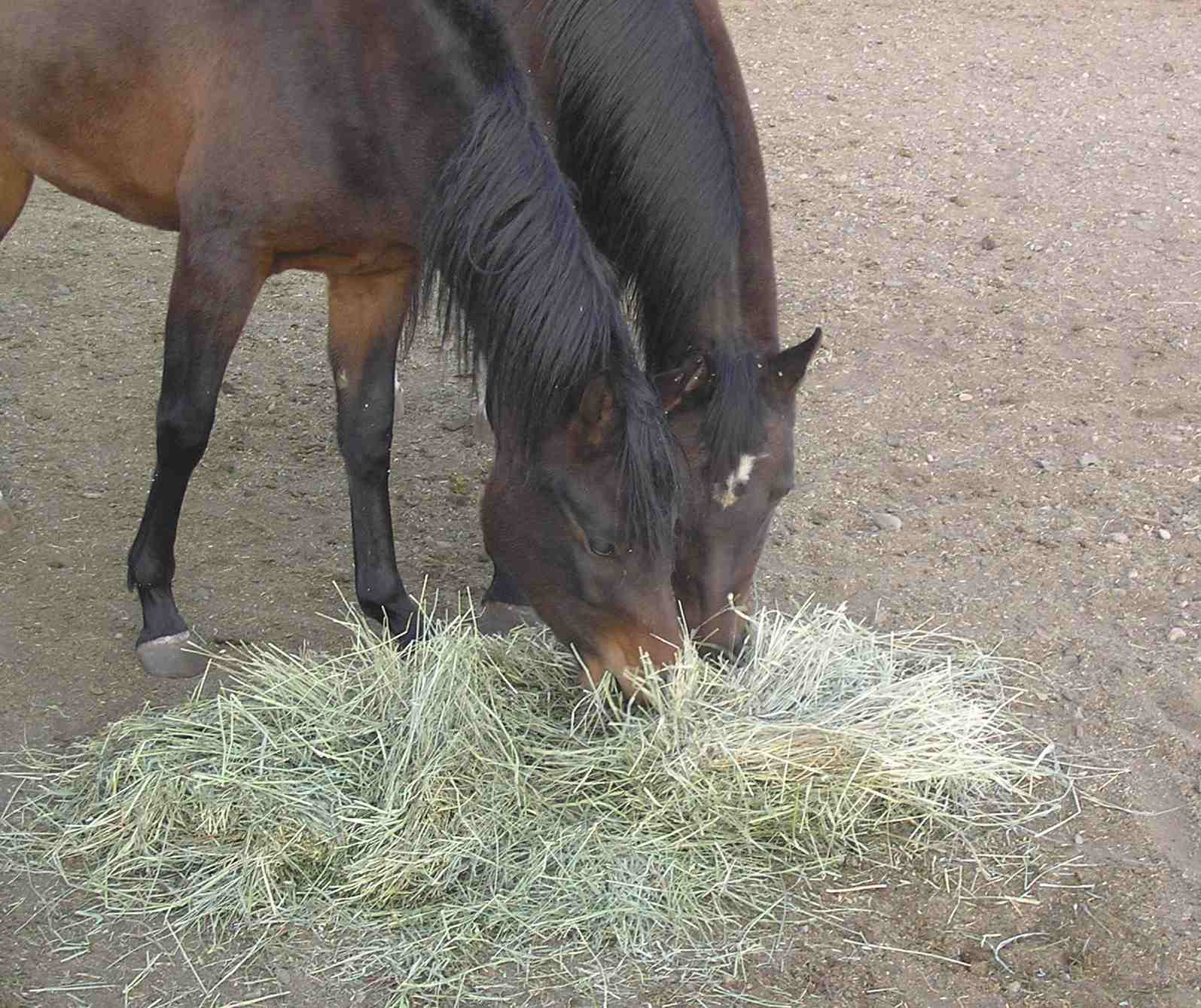
Forages, such as hay, make up the largest portion of the equine diet by weight.

Equids can consume approximately 2–2.5% of their body weight in dry feed each day. Therefore, a 1,000 lb (450 kg) adult horse could eat up to 25 lb (11 kg) of food. Foals less than six months of age eat 2–4% of their weight each day.

Solid feeds are placed into three categories: forages (such as hay and grass), concentrates (including grain or pelleted rations), and supplements (such as prepared vitamin or mineral pellets). Equine nutritionists recommend that 50% or more of the animal's diet by weight should be forages. If a horse is working hard and requires more energy, the use of grain is increased and the percentage of forage decreased so that the horse obtains the energy content it needs for the work it is performing. However, forage amount should never go below 1% of the horse's body weight per day.

=== Forages ===
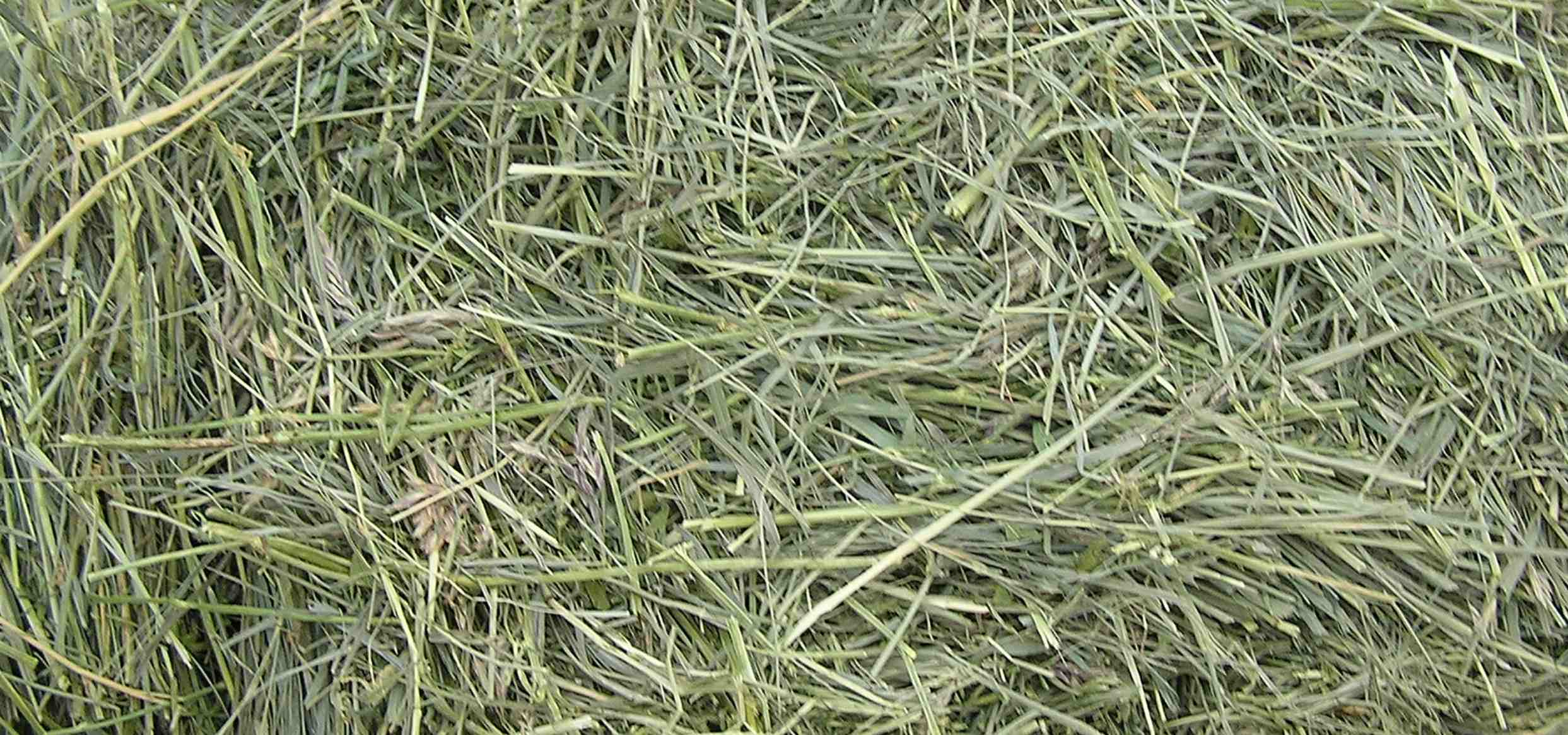
Good quality grass hay is green and has visible leaves and young seed heads.

Forages, also known as "roughage," are plant materials classified as legumes or grasses, found in pastures or in hay. Often, pastures and hayfields will contain a blend of both grasses and legumes. Nutrients available in forage vary greatly with maturity of the grasses, fertilization, management, and environmental conditions. Grasses are tolerant of a wide range of conditions and contain most necessary nutrients. Some commonly used grasses include timothy, brome, fescue, coastal Bermuda, orchard grass, and Kentucky bluegrass. Another type of forage sometimes provided to horses is beet pulp, a byproduct left over from the processing of sugar beets, which is high in energy as well as fiber.

Legumes such as clover or alfalfa are usually higher in protein, calcium, and energy than grasses. However, they require warm weather and good soil to produce the best nutrients. Legume hays are generally higher in protein than the grass hays. They are also higher in minerals, particularly calcium, but have an incorrect ratio of calcium to phosphorus. Because they are high in protein, they are very desirable for growing horses or those subjected to very hard work, but the calcium:phosphorus ratio must be balanced by other feeds to prevent bone abnormalities.

Hay is a dried mixture of grasses and legumes. It is cut in the field and then dried and baled for storage. Hay is most nutritious when it is cut early on, before the seed heads are fully mature and before the stems of the plants become tough and thick. Hay that is very green can be a good indicator of the amount of nutrients in the hay; however, color is not the sole indicator of quality—smell and texture are also important. Hay can be analyzed by many laboratories and that is the most reliable way to tell the nutritional values it contains.

Hay, particularly alfalfa, is sometimes compressed into pellets or cubes. Processed hay can be of more consistent quality and is more convenient to ship and to store. It is also easily obtained in areas that may be suffering localized hay shortages. However, these more concentrated forms can be overfed and horses are somewhat more prone to choke on them. On the other hand, hay pellets and cubes can be soaked until they break apart into a pulp or thick slurry, and in this state are a very useful source of food for horses with tooth problems such as dental disease, tooth loss due to age, or structural anomalies.

Production quality also matters. If hay is baled with too much moisture, or if a dead animal, such as a snake or rodent, is caught in a bale, the subsequent botulism toxins released can contaminate an entire bale of hay.

Haylage, also known as Round bale silage, is a term for grass sealed in airtight plastic bags, a form of forage that is frequently fed in the United Kingdom and continental Europe, but is not often seen in the United States. Because haylage is a type of silage, hay stored in this fashion must remain completely sealed in plastic, as any holes or tears can stop the preservation properties of fermentation and lead to mold or spoilage. Rodents chewing through the plastic can also spoil the hay introducing contamination to the bale. If a rodent dies inside the plastic, the subsequent botulism toxins released can contaminate the entire bale.

Sometimes, straw or chaff is fed to animals. However, this is roughage with little nutritional value other than providing fiber, and is more often used as a bedding in stalls to absorb waste. It is sometimes used as a filler; it can slow down horses who eat their grain too fast, or it can provide additional fiber when the horse must meet most nutritional needs via concentrated feeds.

=== Concentrates ===
==== Grains ====
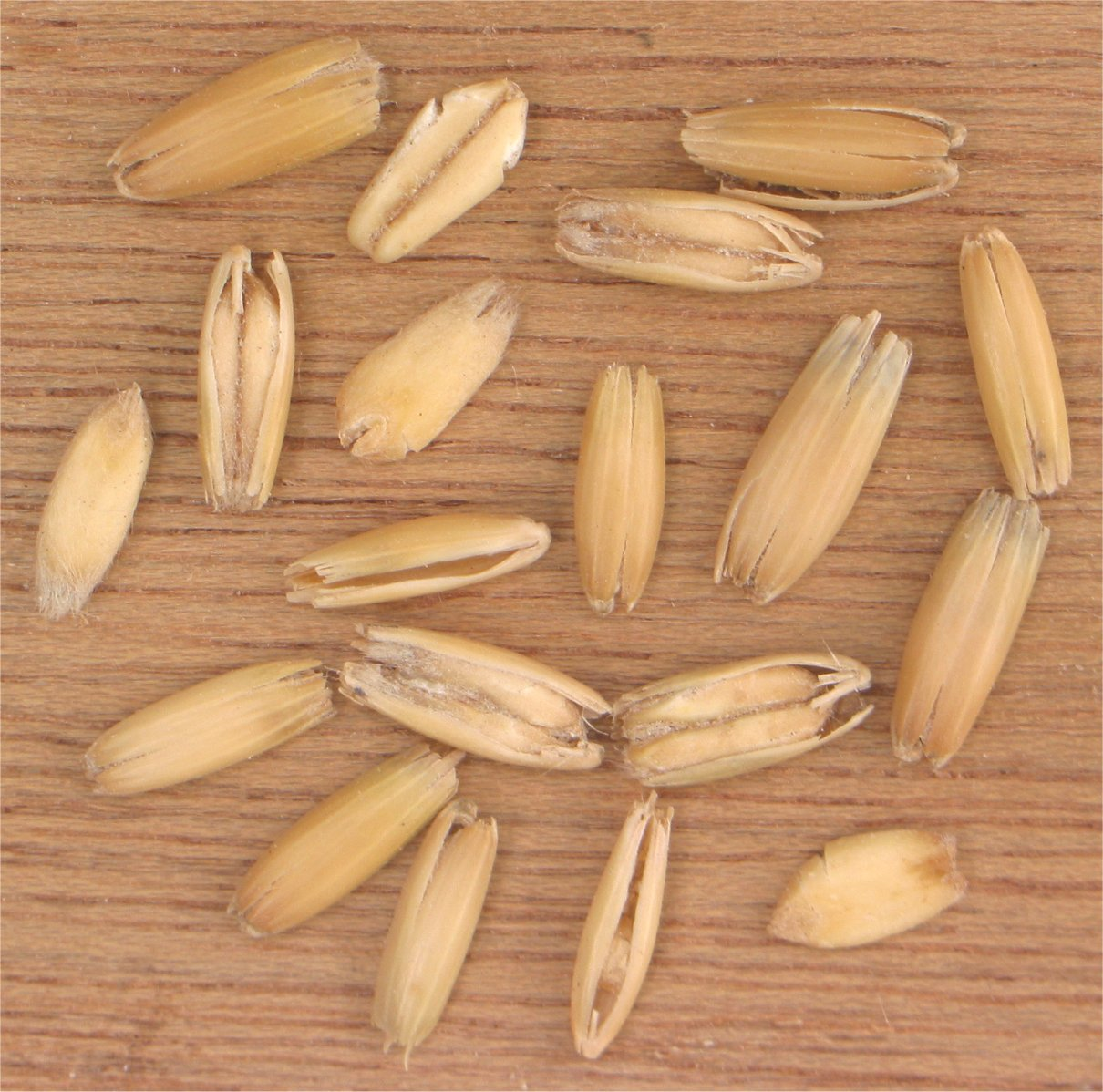
Oats

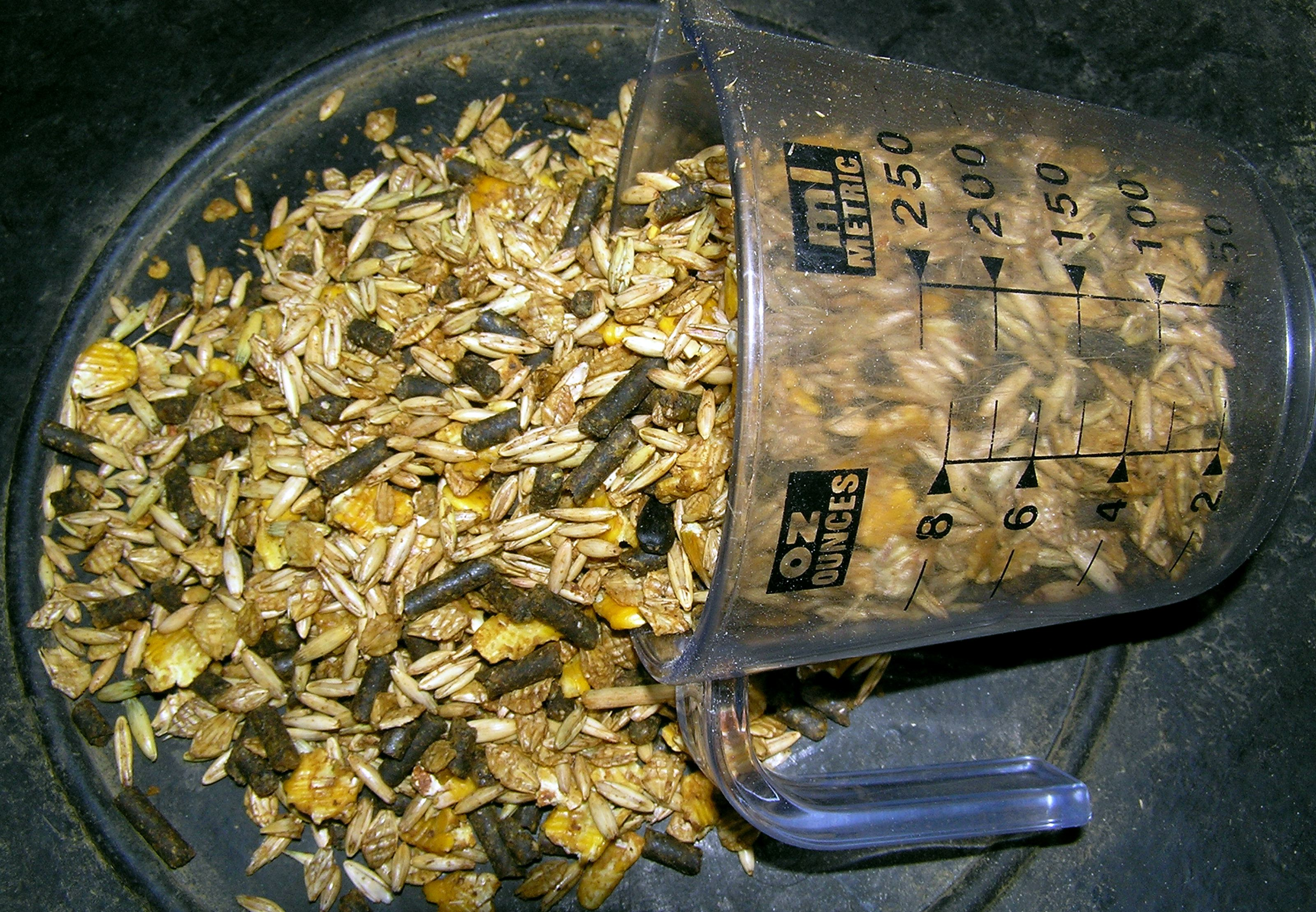
A premixed ration of crimped corn, oats, barley and pelleted supplement

Whole or crushed grains are a common form of concentrated feed for horses.

Oats are the most popular grain for horses. Oats have a lower digestible energy value and higher fiber content than most other grains. They form a loose mass in the stomach that is well suited to the equine digestive system. They are also more palatable and digestible than other grains.

Corn (USA), or maize (British English), is the second most palatable grain. It provides twice as much digestible energy as an equal volume of oats and is low in fiber. Because of these characteristics, it is easy to over-feed, causing obesity, so horses are seldom fed corn all by itself. Nutritionists caution that moldy corn is poisonous if fed to horses.

Barley is also fed to horses, but needs to be processed to crack the seed hull and allow easier digestibility. It is frequently fed in combination with oats and corn, a mix informally referred to by the acronym "COB" (for Corn, Oats and Barley).

Wheat is generally not used as a concentrate. However, wheat bran is sometimes added to the diet of a horse for supplemental nutrition, usually moistened and in the form of a bran mash. Wheat bran is high in phosphorus, so must be fed carefully so that it does not cause an imbalance in the Ca:P ratio of a ration. Once touted for a laxative effect, this use of bran is now considered unnecessary, as horses, unlike humans, obtain sufficient fiber in their diets from other sources.

==== Mixes and pellets ====
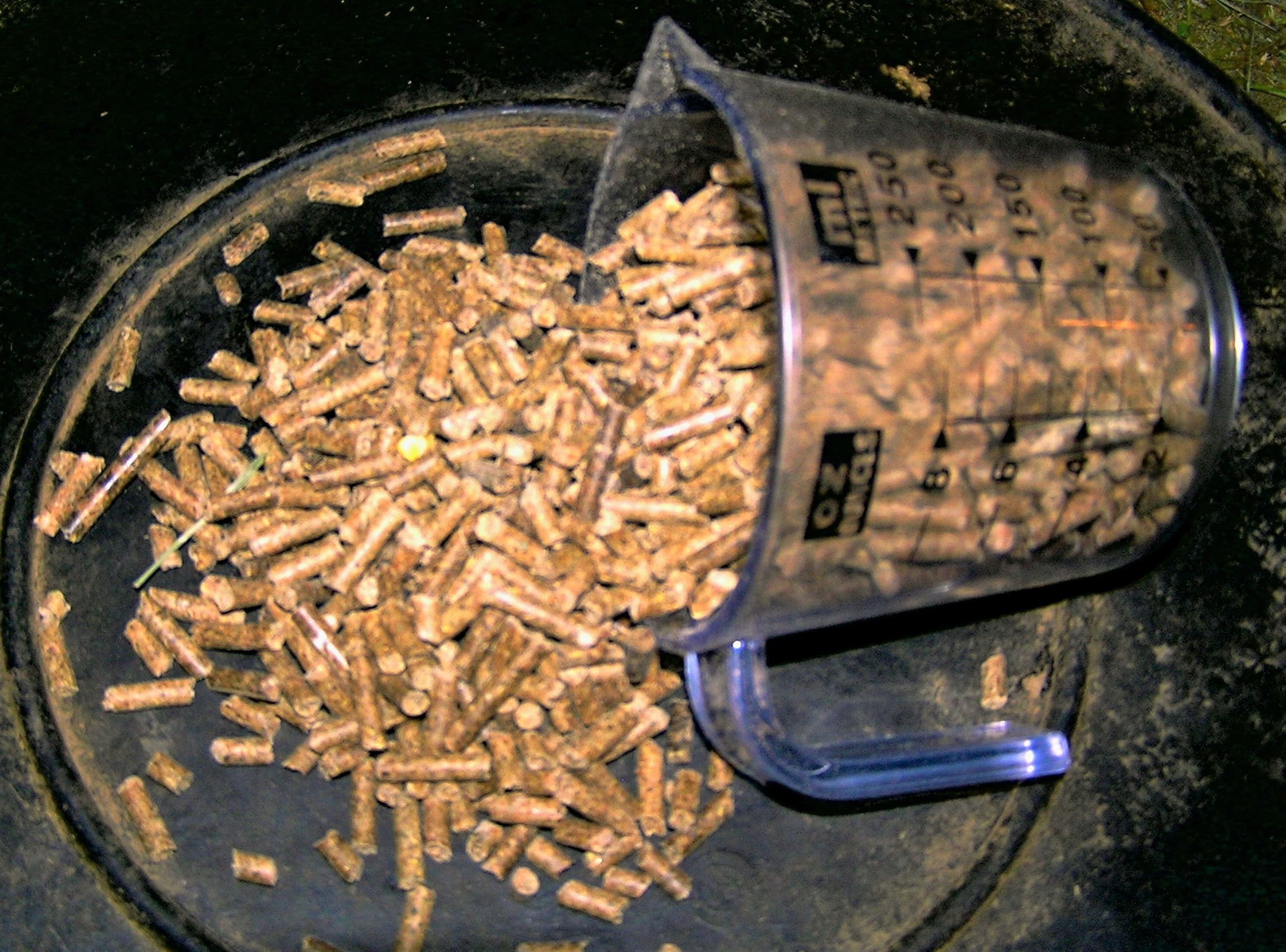
A pelleted or extruded horse ration contains grain and other plant products, plus vitamin and mineral supplements.

Many feed manufacturers combine various grains and add additional vitamin and mineral supplements to create a complete premixed feed that is easy for owners to feed and of predictable nutritional quality. Some of these prepared feeds are manufactured in pelleted form, others retain the grains in their original form. In many cases molasses is used as a binder to keep down dust and for increased palatability. Grain mixes with added molasses are usually called "sweet feed" in the United States and "coarse mix" in the United Kingdom. Pelleted or extruded feeds (sometimes referred to as "nuts" in the UK) may be easier to chew and result in less wasted feed. Horses generally eat pellets as easily as grain. However, pellets are also more expensive, and even "complete" rations do not eliminate the necessity for forage.

==== Supplements ====
The average modern horse on good hay or pasture with light work usually does not need supplements; however, horses subjected to stress due to age, intensive athletic work, or reproduction may need additional nutrition. Extra fat and protein are sometimes added to the horse's diet, along with vitamin and mineral supplements.

Soybean meal is a common protein supplement, and averages about 44% crude protein. The protein in soybean meal is high-quality, with the proper ratio of dietary essential amino acids for equids. Cottonseed meal, linseed meal, and peanut meal are also used, but are not as common.

== Feeding practices ==
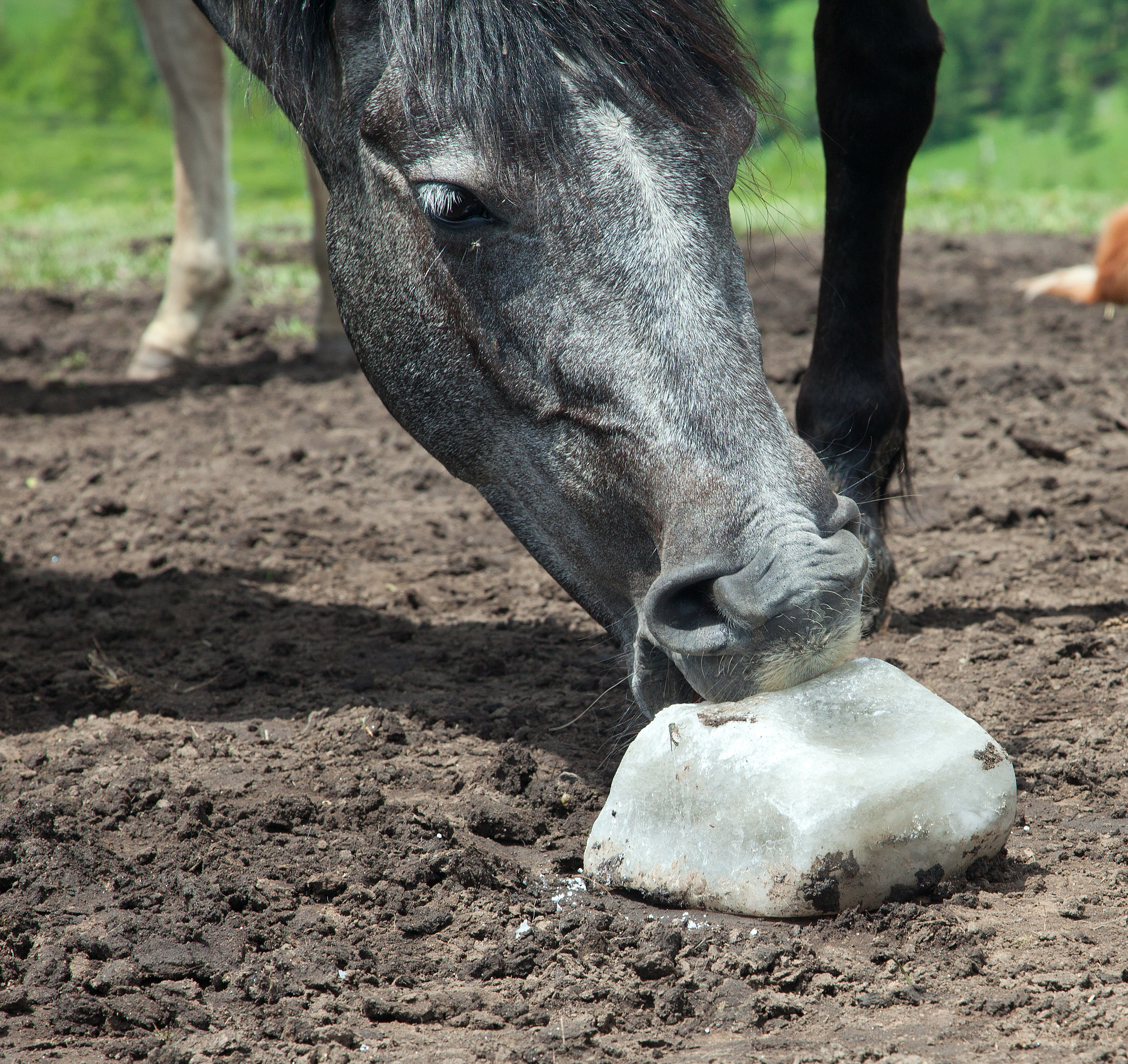
A salt block

Most horses only need quality forage, water, and a salt or mineral block. Grain or other concentrates are often not necessary. But, when grain or other concentrates are fed, quantities must be carefully monitored. To do so, horse feed is measured by weight, not volume. For example, 1 lb (0.45 kg) of oats has a different volume than 1 lb (0.45 kg) of corn. When continuous access to feed is not possible, it is more consistent with natural feeding behavior to provide three small feedings per day instead of one or two large ones. However, even two daily feedings is preferable to only one. To gauge the amount to feed, a weight tape can be used to provide a reasonably accurate estimate of a horse's weight. The tape measures the circumference of the horse's barrel, just behind the withers and elbows, and the tape is calibrated to convert circumference into approximate weight.

Actual amounts fed vary by the size of the horse, the age of the horse, the climate, and the work to which the animal is put. In addition, genetic factors play a role as some horse breeds tend to be easy keepers (good doers), which means that they can thrive on small amounts of food and are prone to obesity and other health problems if overfed, and other breeds tend to be hard keepers (poor doers), meaning that they are prone to be thin and require considerably more food to maintain a healthy weight.

Veterinarians are usually a good source for recommendations on appropriate types and amounts of feed for a specific horse. Animal nutritionists are also trained in how to develop equine rations and make recommendations. There are also numerous books written on the topic. Feed manufacturers usually offer very specific guidelines for how to select and properly feed products from their company, and in the United States, the local office of the Cooperative Extension Service can provide educational materials and expert recommendations.

=== Feeding forages ===
Equids always require forage. When possible, nutritionists recommend it be available at all times, at least when doing so does not overfeed the animal and lead to obesity. It is safe to feed a ration that is 100% forage (along with water and supplemental salt), and any feed ration should be at least 50% forage. Hay with alfalfa or other legumes has more concentrated nutrition and so is fed in smaller amounts than grass hay, though many hays have a mixture of both types of plant.

When beet pulp is fed, a ration of 2 lb (0.91 kg) to 5 lb (2.3 kg) is usually soaked in water for 3 to 4 hours prior to feeding in order to make it more palatable, and to minimize the risk of choke and other problems. It is usually soaked in a proportion of one part beet pulp to two parts water. Beet pulp is usually fed in addition to hay, but occasionally is a replacement for hay when fed to very old horses who can no longer chew properly.

Some pelleted rations are designed to be a "complete" feed that contains both hay and grain, meeting all the horse's nutritional needs. However, even these rations should have some hay or pasture provided, a minimum of a half-pound of forage for every 100 lb (45 kg) of horse, in order to keep the digestive system functioning properly and to meet the horse's urge to graze.

When horses graze under natural conditions, they may spend up to 18 hours per day doing so. However, on modern irrigated pastures, they may have their nutritional needs for forage met in as little as three hours per day, depending on the quality of grass available.

Another factor when feeding forages is the level of various non-structural carbohydrates (NSC), such as fructan. Too high an NSC level causes difficulties for animals prone to laminitis or equine polysaccharide storage myopathy (EPSM). NSC cannot be determined by looking at forage, but hay and pasture grasses can be tested for NSC levels.

=== Feeding concentrates ===
Concentrates, when fed, are recommended to be provided in quantities no greater than 1% of a horse's body weight per day, and preferably in two or more feedings of no more than 0.5% of body weight each. If a ration needs to contain a higher percent of concentrates, such as that of a race horse, bulky grains such as oats should be used as much as possible; a loose mass of feed helps prevent impaction colic. Equine gastric ulcer syndrome is linked to a too-high concentration of grain in the diet, particularly noticed in modern racehorses, where some studies show such ulcers affecting up to 90% of all race horses.

In general, the portion of the ration that should be grain or other concentrated feed is 0-10% grain for mature idle horses; between 20-70% for horses at work, depending on age, intensity of activity, and energy requirements. Concentrates should not be fed to horses within one hour before or after a heavy workout. Concentrates also need to be adjusted to level of performance. Not only can excess grain and inadequate exercise lead to behavior problems, it may also trigger serious health problems that include Equine Exertional Rhabdomyolysis, or "tying up", in horses prone to the condition. Another possible risk are various forms of horse colic. A relatively uncommon, but usually fatal concern is colitis-X, which may be triggered by excess protein and lack of forage in the diet that allows for the multiplication of clostridial organisms, and is exacerbated by stress.

=== Access to water ===
Horses normally require free access to all the fresh, clean water they want, and to avoid dehydration, should not be kept from water longer than four hours at any one time. Historic traditions cautioned people from allowing hot horses to drink water immediately after exercise for fear they would develop horse colic or laminitis. Modern research determined that a working horse can drink its fill at periodic intervals, with the caveat that overheated horses could have problems if they drink from extremely cold water sources. When a workout has ended, it is usually safe for horses to drink right after exercise, and continue to be offered water every three to five minutes to aid in the cooling process. But it is also crucial to cool and walk the horse for 30–90 minutes to avoid colic, muscular problems, or other complications. One reason to offer water immediately after exercise and continue to offer it is because the thirst mechanism may not correlate to a horse's actual needs. It may take a few minutes for the thirst mechanism to activate, but also, withholding water immediately after a workout can suppress the thirst drive, leading to insufficient rehydration.

Even a slightly dehydrated horse is at higher risk of developing impaction colic. Additionally, dehydration can lead to weight loss because the horse cannot produce adequate amounts of saliva, thus decreasing the amount of feed and dry forage consumed. Thus, it is especially important for horse owners to encourage their horses to drink when there is a risk of dehydration; when horses are losing a great deal of water in hot weather due to strenuous work, or in cold weather due to horses' natural tendency to drink less when in a cold environment. To encourage drinking, owners may add electrolytes to the feed, additives to make the water especially palatable (such as apple juice), or, when it is cold, to warm the water so that it is not at a near-freezing temperature.

=== Special feeding issues for ponies ===
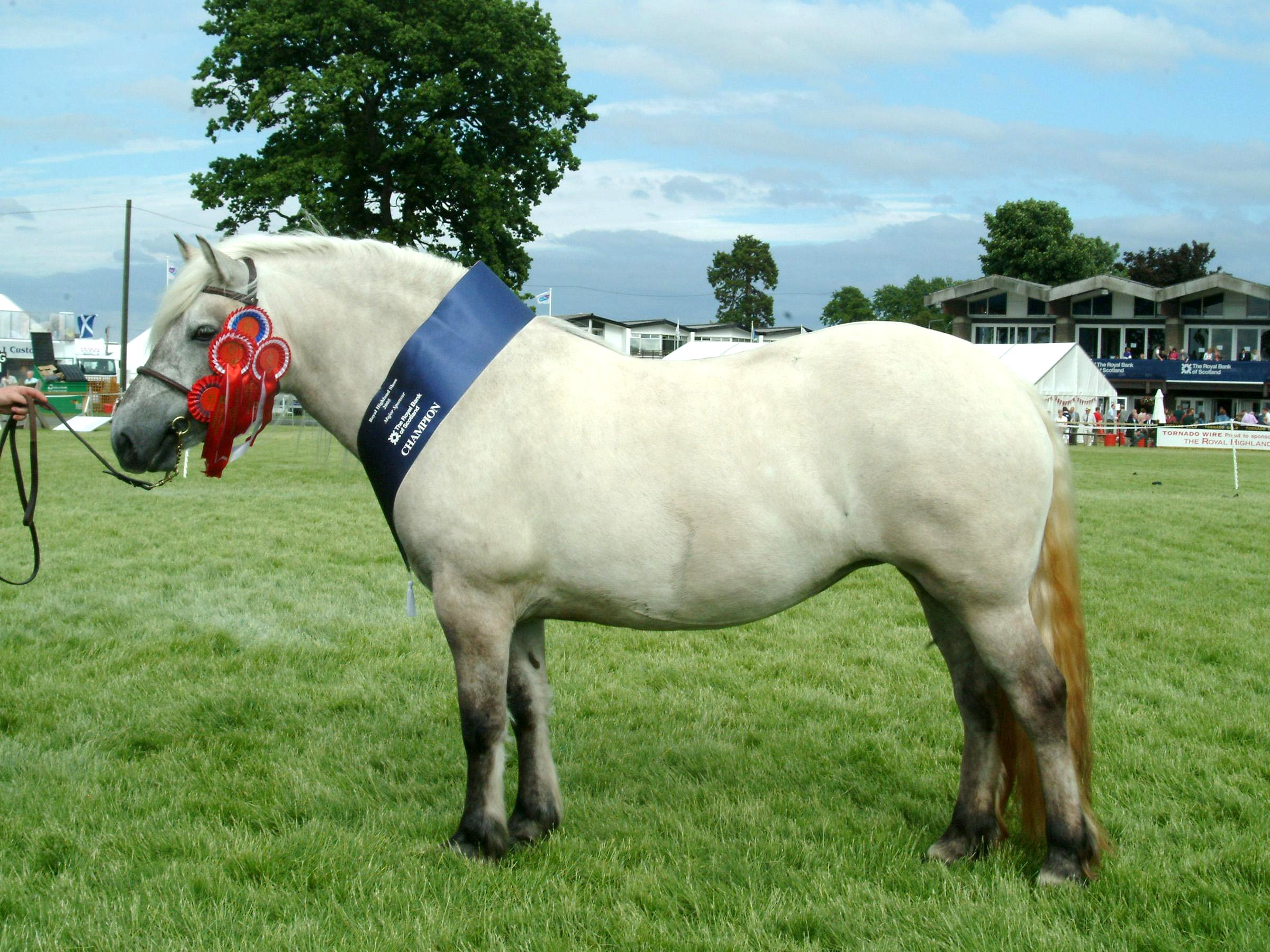
Ponies need less feed than full-sized horses.

Ponies and miniature horses are usually easy keepers and need less feed than full-sized horses. This is not only because they are smaller, but also, because they evolved under harsher living conditions than horses, they use feed more efficiently. Ponies easily become obese from overfeeding and are at high risk for colic and, especially, laminitis. Fresh grass is a particular danger to ponies; they can develop laminitis in as little as one hour of grazing on lush pasture.

Incorrect feeding is also as much a concern as simple overfeeding. Ponies and miniatures need a diet relatively low in sugars and starches and calories, but higher in fibers. Miniature horses in particular need fewer calories pound for pound than a regular horse, and are more prone to hyperlipemia than regular horses, and are also at higher risk of developing equine metabolic syndrome.

It is important to track the weight of a pony carefully, by use of a weight tape. Forages may be fed based on weight, at a rate of about 1 lb (0.45 kg) of forage for every 100 lb (45 kg). Forage, along with water and a salt and mineral block, is all most ponies require. If a hard-working pony needs concentrates, a ratio of no more than 30% concentrates to 70% forage is recommended. Concentrates designed for horses, with added vitamins and minerals, will often provide insufficient nutrients at the small serving sizes needed for ponies. Therefore, if a pony requires concentrates, feed and supplements designed specially for ponies should be used. In the UK, extruded pellets designed for ponies are sometimes called "pony nuts".

=== Special feeding issues for mules and donkeys ===
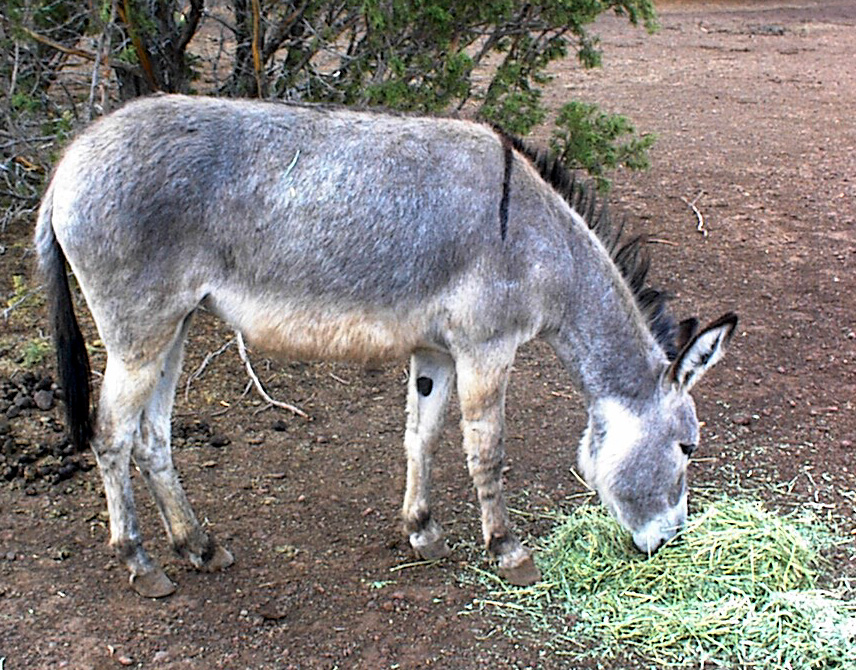
Donkeys and mules need less concentrated feed than horses.

Like ponies, mules and donkeys are also very hardy and generally need less concentrated feed than horses. Mules need less protein than horses and do best on grass hay with a vitamin and mineral supplement. If mules are fed concentrates, they only need about half of what a horse requires. Like horses, mules require fresh, clean water, but are less likely to over-drink when hot.

Donkeys, like mules, need less protein and more fiber than horses. Although the donkey's gastrointestinal tract has no marked differences in structure to that of the horse, donkeys are more efficient at digesting food and thrive on less forage than a similar sized pony. They only need to eat 1.5% of their body weight per day in dry matter. It is not fully understood why donkeys are such efficient digestors, but it is thought that they may have a different microbial population in the large intestine than do horses, or possibly an increased gut retention time.

Donkeys do best when allowed to consume small amounts of food over long periods, as is natural for them in an arid climate. They can meet their nutritional needs on 6 to 7 hours of grazing per day on average dryland pasture that is not stressed by drought. If they are worked long hours or do not have access to pasture, they require hay or a similar dried forage, with no more than a 1:4 ratio of legumes to grass. They also require salt and mineral supplements, and access to clean, fresh water. Like ponies and mules, in a lush climate, donkeys are prone to obesity and are at risk of laminitis.

=== Treats ===
Many people like to feed horses special treats such as carrots, sugar cubes, peppermint candies, or specially manufactured horse "cookies." Horses do not need treats, and due to the risk of colic or choke, many horse owners do not allow their horses to be given treats. There are also behavioral issues that some horses may develop if given too many treats, particularly a tendency to bite if hand-fed, and for this reason many horse trainers and riding instructors discourage the practice.

However, if treats are allowed, carrots and compressed hay pellets are common, nutritious, and generally not harmful. Apples are also acceptable, though best if cored or sliced, as the seeds contain toxins. Horse "cookies" are often specially manufactured out of ordinary grains and some added molasses. They generally will not cause nutritional problems when fed in small quantities. However, many types of foods are potentially dangerous to a horse and should not be fed. This includes bread products, meat products, potatoes, brassicas, stone fruits, chocolate, and caffeinated beverages.

It was once a common practice to give horses a weekly bran mash of wheat bran mixed with warm water and other ingredients. It is still done regularly in some places. While a warm, soft meal is a treat many horses enjoy, and was once considered helpful for its laxative effect, it is not nutritionally necessary. An old horse with poor teeth may benefit from food softened in water, a mash may help provide extra hydration, and a warm meal may be comforting in cold weather, but horses have far more fiber in their regular diet than do humans, and so any assistance from bran is unnecessary. There is also a risk that too much wheat bran may provide excessive phosphorus, unbalancing the diet, and a feed of unusual contents fed only once a week could trigger a bout of colic.

== Feed storage ==
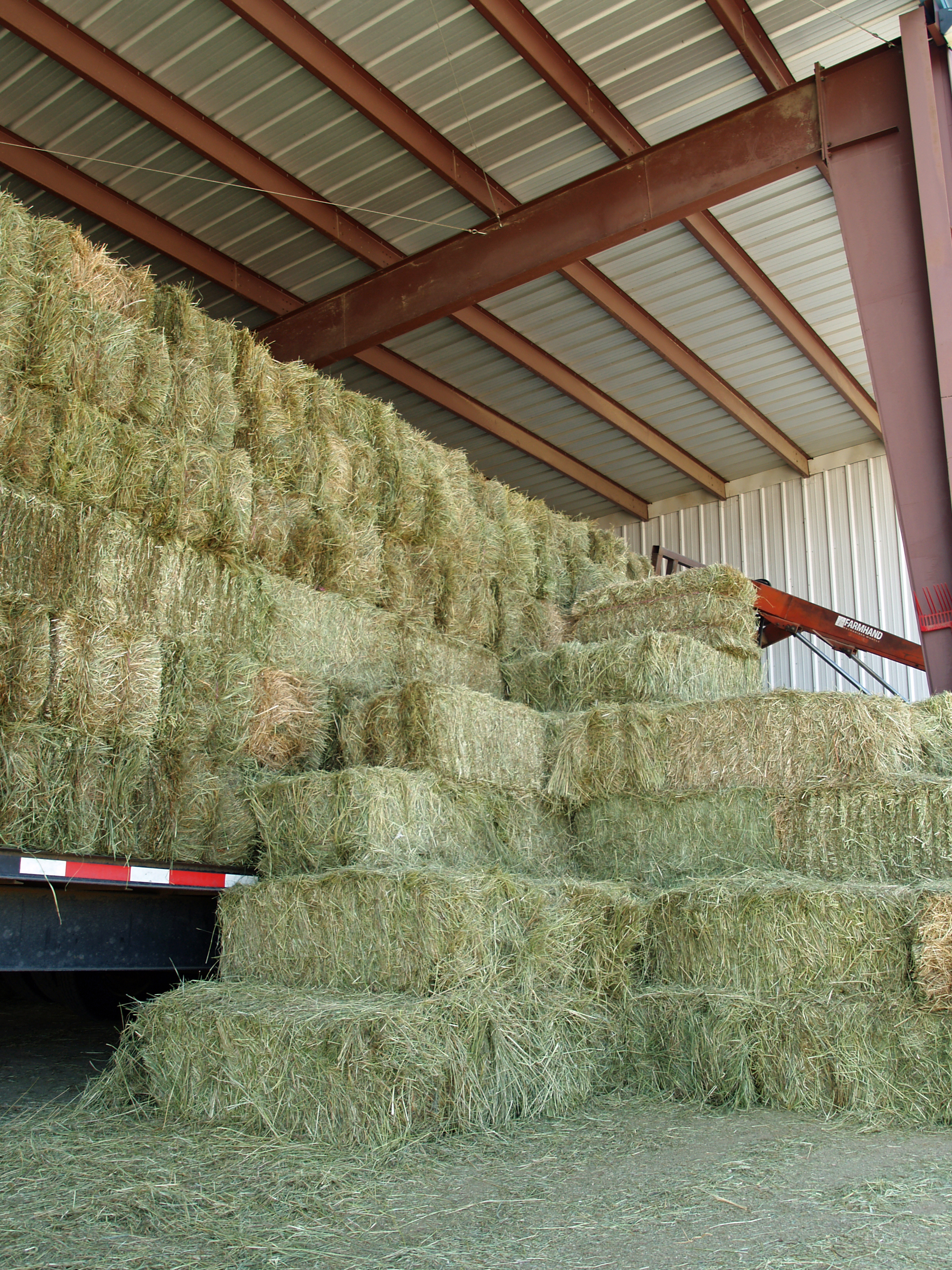
Hay stored in a shed to keep it dry

All hay and concentrated feeds must be kept dry and free of mold, rodent feces, and other types of contamination that may cause illness in horses. Feed kept outside or otherwise exposed to moisture can develop mold quite quickly. Due to fire hazards, hay is often stored under an open shed or under a tarp, rather than inside a horse barn itself, but should be kept under some kind of cover. Concentrates take up less storage space, are less of a fire hazard, and are usually kept in a barn or enclosed shed. A secure door or latched gate between the animals and any feed storage area is critical. Horses accidentally getting into stored feed and eating too much at one time is a common but preventable way that horses develop colic or laminitis. (See § Illnesses related to improper feeding below)

It is generally not safe to give a horse feed that was contaminated by the remains of a dead animal. This is a potential source of botulism. This is not an uncommon situation. For example, mice and birds can get into poorly stored grain and be trapped; hay bales sometimes accidentally contain snakes, mice, or other small animals that were caught in the baling machinery during the harvesting process.

== Feeding behavior ==
Horses can become anxious or stressed if there are long periods of time between meals. They also do best when they are fed on a regular schedule; they are creatures of habit and easily upset by changes in routine. When horses are in a herd, their behavior is hierarchical; the higher-ranked animals in the herd eat and drink first. Low-status animals, who eat last, may not get enough food, and if there is little available feed, higher-ranking horses may keep lower-ranking ones from eating at all. Therefore, unless a herd is on pasture that meets the nutritional needs of all individuals, it is important to either feed horses separately, or spread feed out in separate areas to be sure all animals get roughly equal amounts of food to eat. In some situations where horses are kept together, they may still be placed into separate herds, grouping horses together based upon having similar nutritional needs.

== Dental issues ==
Horses' teeth continually erupt throughout their life, are worn down as they eat, and can develop uneven wear patterns that can interfere with chewing. For this reason, horses need a dental examination at least once a year, and particular care must be paid to the dental needs of older horses. The process of grinding off uneven wear patterns on a horse's teeth is called floating and can be performed by a veterinarian or a specialist in equine dentistry.

== Illnesses related to improper feeding ==
Colic, choke, and laminitis can be life-threatening when a horse is severely affected, and veterinary care is necessary to properly treat these conditions. Other conditions, while not life-threatening, may have serious implications for the long-term health and soundness of a horse.

=== Colic ===
Horse colic itself is not a disease, but rather a description of symptoms connected to abdominal pain. It can occur due to any number of digestive upsets, from mild bloating due to excess intestinal gas to life-threatening impactions. Colic is most often caused by a change in diet, either a planned change that takes place too quickly, or an accidental change, such as a horse getting out of its barn or paddock and ingesting unfamiliar plants. But colic has many other possible triggers including insufficient water, an irregular feeding schedule, stress, and illness. Because the horse cannot vomit and has a limited capacity to detoxify harmful substances, anything upsetting to the horse must travel all the way through the digestive system to be expelled.

=== Choke ===
Choke is not as common as colic, but is nonetheless commonly considered a veterinary emergency. The most common cause of choke is horses not chewing their food thoroughly, usually because of eating their food too quickly, especially if they do not have sufficient access to water, but also sometimes due to dental problems that make chewing painful. It is exceedingly difficult for a horse to expel anything from the esophagus, and immediate treatment is often required. Unlike choking in humans, choke in horses does not cut off respiration.

=== Laminitis ===
Horses are also susceptible to laminitis, a disease of the lamina of the hoof. Laminitis has many causes, but the most common is related to a sugar and starch overload from a horse overeating certain types of food, particularly too much pasture grass high in fructan in early spring and late fall, or by consuming excessive quantities of grain.

=== Growth disorders ===
Young horses that are overfed or are fed a diet with an improper calcium:phosphorus ratio over time may develop a number of growth and orthopedic disorders, including osteochondrosis (OCD), angular limb deformities (ALD), and several conditions under the umbrella of the developmental orthopedic diseases (DOD). If not properly treated, damage can be permanent. However, they can be treated if caught in time, given proper veterinary care, and any improper feeding practices are corrected. Young horses being fed for rapid growth in order to be shown or sold as yearlings are at particularly high risk. Adult horses with an improper diet may also develop a range of metabolic problems.

=== Heaves ===
Moldy or dusty hay fed to horses is the most common cause of Recurrent airway obstruction, also known as COPD or "heaves,” a chronic condition of horses involving an allergic bronchitis.

=== Tying up ===
Equine exertional rhabdomyolysis, also known as "tying up" or azoturia, is a condition to which only some horses are susceptible and most cases are linked to a genetic mutation. In horses prone to the condition, it usually occurs when a day of rest on full grain ration is followed by work the next day. This pattern of clinical signs led to the archaic nickname "Monday morning sickness". The condition may also be related to electrolyte imbalance. Proper diet management may help minimize the risk of an attack.

== See also ==
- Easy keeper (US) Good doer (UK)
- Hard keeper (US) Poor doer (UK)
- Henneke horse body condition scoring system
- Horse body mass
- Horse care
- List of plants poisonous to equines
