= Carcass grade =

Assessment of quality for a culled cow or bull

A carcass grade is an assessment of quality for a culled cow or bull. The various grades are defined by the United States Department of Agriculture, and assessments are based primarily on the fatness of the cow to be culled.

Cows are culled from herds for a variety of reasons, including poor production, age, or health problems. A carcass grade (or expected carcass grade) is used to determine selling prices for cull cows, which are estimated to comprise 20% of the beef available to consumers in the United States.

A Body Condition Scoring system or BCS, which is used to grade live cows and bulls, is used to determine the carcass grade. The most common BCS in America assigns a score between 1 and 9 based on the animal's fat content and body condition.

The most common carcass grades, from best to worst, are "breakers" (fleshy, BCS 7 or above), "boners" (average, BCS 5 to 7), "lean" and "light" (thin, BCS 1 to 4). Here, the grading system differs from that within a BCS - the aforementioned American example of which regards a live animal with a score of 5 or 6 to be optimal, with a score above this designating the beast as "fat."^{[a]}

Carcasses rated as lean or light often are sold for less per pound, as less meat is produced from the carcass despite processing costs remaining similar to those of higher grade carcasses.

== See also ==
- Beef

== Notes ==
- ^a There is no settled singular noun for "a cattle." Head of cattle is usually used only after a numeral. Australian, New Zealand and British farmers use the term beast or cattle beast. Bovine is also used in Britain. The term critter is common in the western United States and Canada, particularly when referring to young cattle. See List of cattle terminology for more.
