= Hard keeper =

Term used in animal husbandry

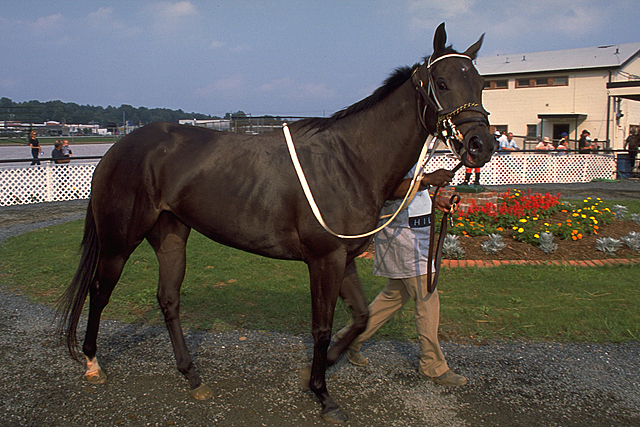
The Thoroughbred is a breed of horse that is naturally lean and can be difficult to keep in good flesh. This horse is in racing condition and is thin, but not too thin when considering the work that is being asked of it.

A hard keeper or (British English) poor doer is a horse or other livestock animal that is naturally prone to be thin, will lose weight quickly, and has difficulty gaining weight.

A horse that is too thin is not necessarily a hard keeper. The animal may be ill, elderly, or has not been provided adequate nutrition. Whenever a horse is too thin, it is well-advised to have a veterinarian give the horse a thorough examination and recommend the best course of action.

The opposite of a hard keeper is an easy keeper (good doer); an animal that can live on relatively little food and is prone to obesity and other health problems associated with a too-rich diet. In contrast, a truly hard keeper is almost never fat under any circumstances.

== Description ==
It is extremely rare for a pony or a donkey to be a hard keeper. The condition is most often seen in light horse breeds that have either a naturally high-strung temperament or breeds that tend to a very lean phenotype and are then subjected to stressful conditions. Breeds with a higher percentage of hard keepers include race horses such as the Thoroughbred, and certain types of show horses bred for style and animation, such as the American Saddlebred.

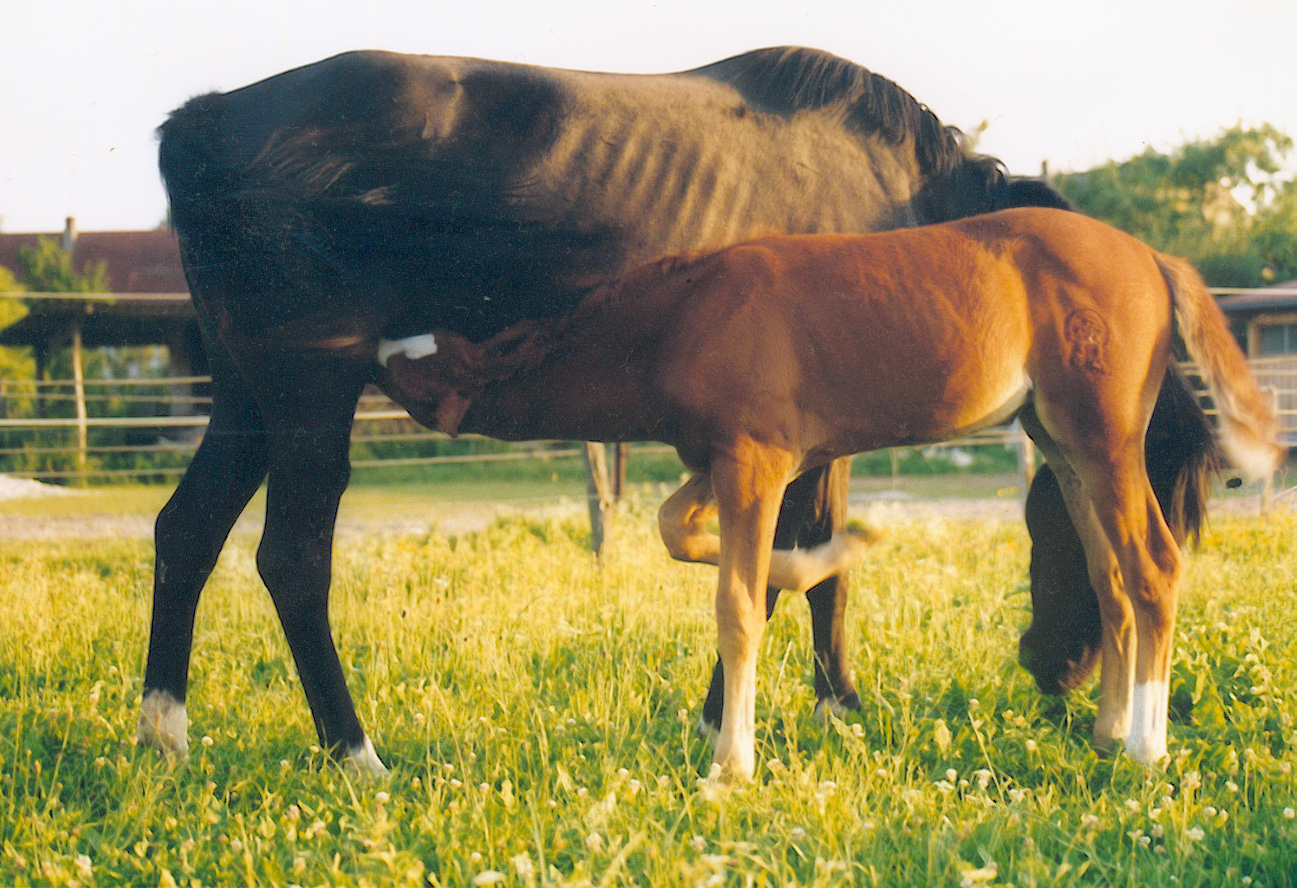
The mare in this image is too thin. She has increased nutritional needs because she is nursing a foal. She may be a hard keeper, or she may not be getting enough supplemental feed to support both herself and the foal.

It is natural for a normal horse to require more nutrition to avoid weight loss if it is pregnant, lactating, under stress due to illness or management conditions, or when subjected to hard work. With a normal horse, adjusting the animal's diet to compensate for the conditions it is facing will usually return the animal to its normal condition. Another reason for weight loss in horses that doesn't have anything to do with being a hard keeper is the inability of some group-fed horses to get a fair shake at feeding time due to being less dominant than other horses.

If an animal is truly a hard keeper, proper nutrition requires a calorie-rich diet, but one that will not make the horse "hot" and prone to excess energy that may lead to yet more nervous behavior and continued weight loss. Forages that are highly nutritious and calorie-dense, such as alfalfa and beet pulp are often recommended. Concentrated feeds that are high in fat but low in carbohydrates, such as rice bran, ground flaxseed, or corn oil are often added to a basic grain or pelleted feed ration to assist weight gain without creating excess energy. High-energy feeds containing significant amounts of sugars, such as molasses, are not usually recommended because they have a tendency to make a horse "hot" or more excitable. However, in cases where a hard keeper also has work with high energy requirements, such as horse racing, an extra, but carefully balanced source of energy may be necessary.

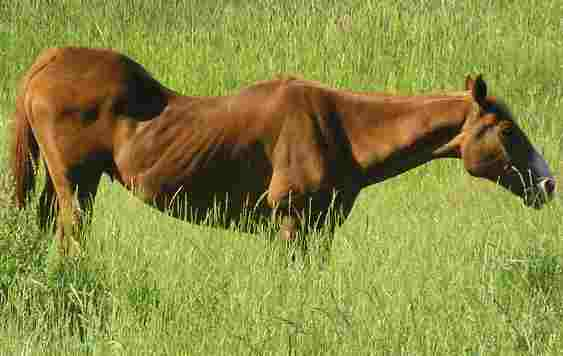
A horse that is elderly and too thin even with adequate forage, such as this horse, may have an underlying dental problem or have trouble digesting a normal diet.

A horse that has not previously had trouble maintaining weight that suddenly begins to lose weight for no apparent reason is not a hard keeper. This type of weight loss is usually a sign of a health problem. In most cases, the horse may require worming to remove internal parasites, or it could have a dental problem that requires floating of the teeth. Sometimes, weight loss is a symptom of a more serious medical condition. Any horse with an unexplained weight loss usually should be examined by a veterinarian.

A normal horse may become a hard keeper when it becomes older, particularly when over the age of 20 to 25 years. There are some body weight distribution changes that are linked to age, including a loss of muscle tone along the spine and hip that lead to somewhat more visible withers, hipbones, and ribs. However, these areas still should maintain good flesh. It is not natural for an old horse to be excessively thin. Sometimes the digestive system of older horses becomes less efficient, and a change in diet to "senior" feeds that are easier to digest is in order. However, weight loss in an older horse is more often linked to a dental problem and proper equine dentistry can often result in a return to normal weight, provided the horse still has enough functional teeth remaining.

In extreme old age, such as when a horse is over 30 years old, the animal may no longer have any molars left, and may require a diet of mushy foods such as hay cubes soaked in water, beet pulp, or other specialized feeds. In such cases, these horses will appear to be too thin, but if obtaining proper nutrition will still have a healthy hair coat, flesh over bone, and other indicators of good health.

In some animal cruelty cases where starvation is alleged, the caretakers of such animals often will claim that too-thin animals are "just a hard keeper" as a defense. However, the weight distribution and musculature of a hard keeper, particularly in the neck and hindquarters, is distinct from that of a starving horse, and a veterinarian can usually provide an expert opinion as to what is normal and what is not.

== Horse body condition scoring ==
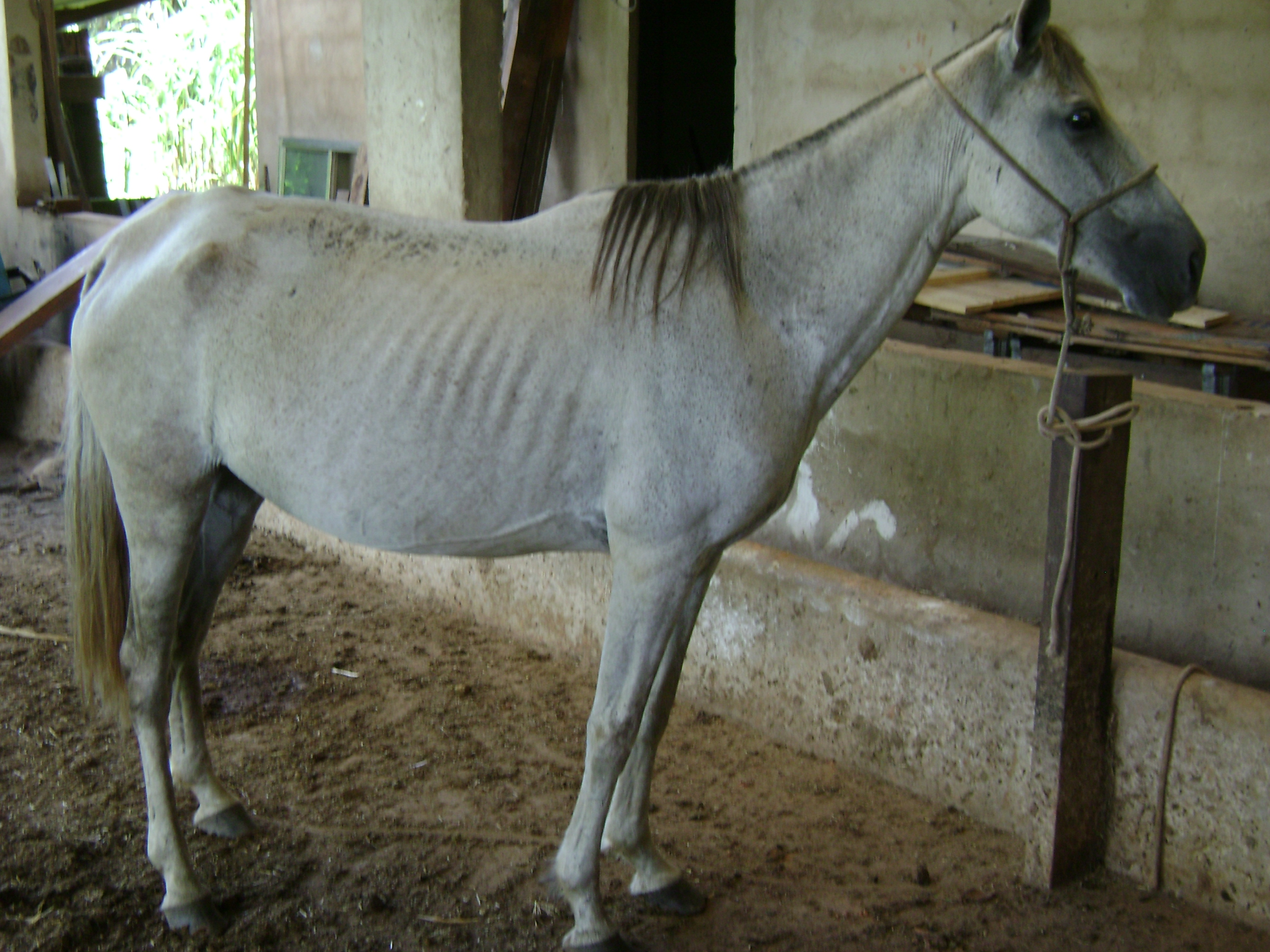
A horse that is not merely a hard keeper, but actually too thin

The Henneke horse body condition scoring system is a standardized scoring table produced by Don Henneke, PhD. The Henneke Chart is a scientific method based on both visual appraisal and palpable fat cover of the six major points of the horse that are most responsive to changes in body fat. The system is used by law enforcement agencies as an objective method of scoring a horse's body condition in horse cruelty cases. These condition categories are as follows:

- 1. Emaciated/Poor
- 2. Very thin
- 3. Thin
- 4. Moderately thin
- 5. Moderate
- 6. Moderately fleshy
- 7. Fleshy
- 8. Fat
- 9. Extremely Fat

== See also ==
- Equine nutrition
