= Easy keeper =

Term used in animal husbandry

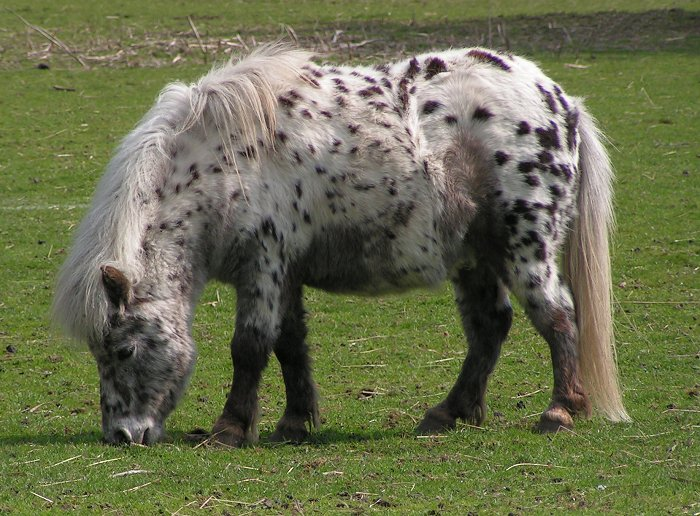
Ponies are classic easy keepers.

An easy keeper, easy doer, or (British English) good doer is a horse that can live on relatively little feed. The opposite of an easy keeper is a hard keeper (poor doer), an animal that is prone to be too thin and has difficulty maintaining adequate weight.

Easy keepers tend to be found most often in breeds originally developed to survive under harsh conditions. Most pony breeds are easy keepers, and smaller, hardy horse breeds such as the Arabian or types such as the mustang have many representatives with this trait. Many draft horse breeds, such as the Percheron, are also easy keepers, as are most mules and donkeys. Though it varies from horse to horse, factors like workload and turnout time can influence the amount of food a horse needs. If overfed with a too rich, modern diet, the easy keeper is prone to obesity and other health problems, including laminitis and metabolic disorders.

Easy keepers may be confused with a mare that is pregnant, but an easy keeper tends to gain weight all over its body, not just in the belly. Easy keepers are not always easy to distinguish from a normal horse that is too fat from simple overfeeding. An easy keeper, though, gains weight more quickly and loses weight more slowly than an ordinary horse, and when fed a standard diet geared toward an average horse, will gain, rather than maintain, weight.

While keeping enough weight on an easy keeper is not problematic, modern animal husbandry practices are often a challenge to such animals, as a modern diet can lead to a number of health problems, including obesity and, in some cases, laminitis. Some easy keepers may be prone to insulin resistance or equine metabolic syndrome (EMS), and possibly are more likely to develop equine Cushing's disease later in life. Easy keepers with a susceptibility to various metabolic problems are also more prone to develop a "cresty" neck, and to not lose weight in that area, even when placed on a diet. Regularly monitoring the horse's body condition score on a regular basis assists in helping the horse maintain proper weight.

== Feeding ==
While easy keepers often thrive in the wild and can survive where other horses might starve, domesticated horses with this trait require strict monitoring of their diets. In particular, easy keepers require very limited amounts of fructan and other non-structural carbohydrates (NSCs), which are found in higher concentrations in fresh spring grass, cool-season grasses, whole grains, late fall grass that has been exposed to a light but not killing frost, and drought-stressed pastures. NSCs are lower in healthy summer pastures, warm-season grasses, and pelleted feeds.

Proper nutrition for an easy keeper involves restricting the diet to mostly a low-NSC hay or very time-limited amounts of grazing on healthy pastures.

Any grain or other concentrated feed is only required in very small quantities, if at all, even for a horse that is getting regular work, but an easy keeper may occasionally require vitamin or mineral supplements. When this is the case, a separate commercial supplement added to a very small quantity of feed that is not premixed with supplements is preferred to a premixed "complete" feed that has supplements added. A complete feed has to be fed at a certain quantity for the animal to obtain proper amounts of the added supplements, which is often more feed than an easy keeper requires.

If a complete feed is needed because the horse is used for intense physical activity with high energy requirements, or as a supplement due to a hay shortage or when very high prices for fodder make a complete feed a cost-effective option, some specialized complete feeds are designed for ponies and easy keepers. These mixes are low in calories and NSC, but with necessary nutrition. In the UK, these feeds are sometimes called "pony nuts". In the United States, no special term is used, though such feeds are often labeled as "lite" feeds or marketed as a pony mix.

Management of an easy keeper requires not only monitoring of diet, but also regular exercise, ideally aerobic exercise obtained by riding or driving the animal on a regular basis.
