= Equine metabolic syndrome =

Endocrinopathy affecting horses and ponies

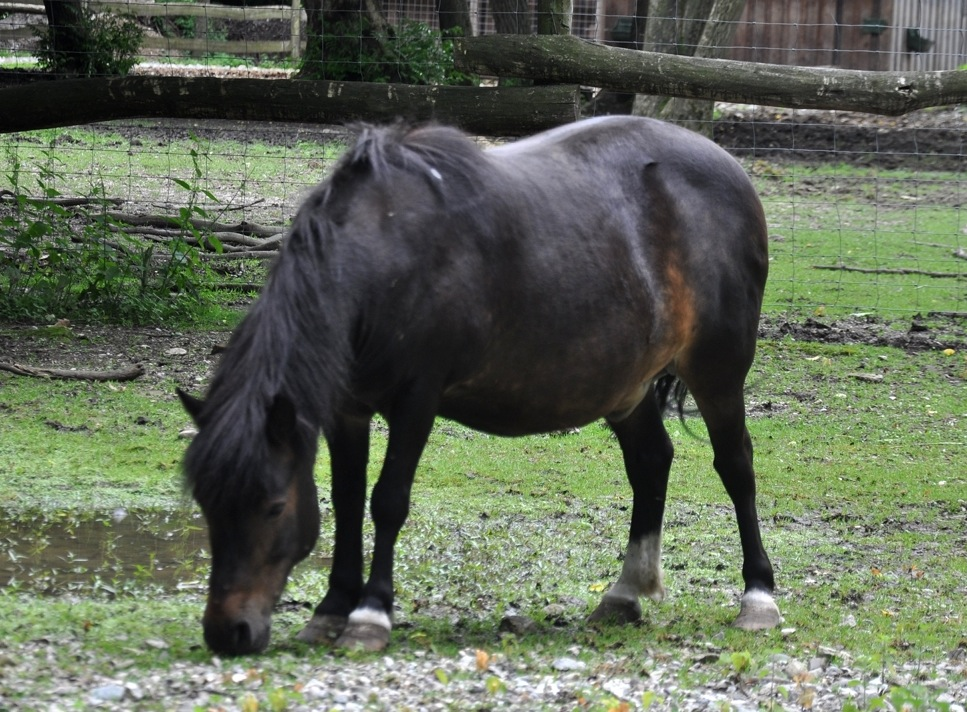
This pony has a body condition suggestive of EMS.

Equine metabolic syndrome (EMS) is an endocrinopathy affecting horses and ponies. It is of primary concern due to its link to obesity, insulin dysregulation, and subsequent laminitis. There are some similarities in clinical signs between EMS and pituitary pars intermedia dysfunction, also known as PPID or Cushing's disease, and some equines may develop both, but they are not the same condition, having different causes and different treatment.

== Pathogenesis ==
The cells of adipose (fat) tissue synthesize hormones known as adipokines. In humans, dysfunction of adipose tissue, even in cases without obesity, has been associated with the development of insulin resistance, hypertension, systemic inflammation, and increased risk of blood clots (thrombosis). The inflammation produced by these hormones are thought to inflame adipose tissue, leading to the production of more adipokines and perpetuation of the cycle, and a constant low-level, pro-inflammatory state. Although it is suspected that a similar mechanism occurs in horses, further research is needed.

=== Insulin dysregulation ===
Insulin dysregulation is commonly seen in horses with EMS, and is associated with obesity. This is similar to type II diabetes in humans, where the action of insulin is impaired, despite often elevated concentrations. It is of interest primarily because of its link to laminitis. Horses with EMS will have an increased insulin response after they are given oral sugars, which will cause a subsequent rise in blood insulin levels, or hyperinsulinemia. Hyperinsulinemia results in decreased tissue sensitivity to insulin, or insulin resistance, especially by the skeletal muscle, liver and adipose tissue. Tissue insulin resistance causes increased insulin secretion, which perpetuates the cycle.

There does appear to be a strong link between decreased insulin sensitivity in obese animals; however, it is unknown which syndrome is the cause and which is the result. It is possible adipokines and cytokines made in adipose tissue down-regulate insulin pathways. It is also possible that IR occurs when adipocytes are overwhelmed, leading to the accumulation of lipid within other tissues. When certain tissues that are sensitive to insulin, such as skeletal muscle, develop triglyceride deposits, cellular functions are altered, one of which is insulin signaling.

=== Laminitis ===
EMS is also implicated in the development of laminitis. Prolonged IV insulin administration can induce laminitis, possibly due to its effects on blood flow to the foot, changes of glucose metabolism and secondary matrix metalloproteinase activation, or altered cell function within the foot. However, recent research suggests that the situation is more complex, in that "compensated insulin resistance is essentially physiological and health sustaining", and only when this compensatory mechanism fails does laminitis ensue. This may support the argument that EMS is an evolved survival trait.

== Breed and age predisposition ==
Ponies and horse breeds that evolved in relatively harsh environments with only sparse grass, the proverbial "easy keeper", tend to be more prone to EMS and insulin resistance. This possibly occurred as a survival mechanism, where the animal would lay down fat during plentiful times, such as the spring and summer, and maintain their weight more easily during the harsh, cold seasons. EMS appears to be more common in Welsh, Dartmoor, and Shetland ponies, Morgans, Paso Finos, Saddlebreds, Spanish Mustangs, and Warmbloods; and may also been seen in Quarter Horses and Tennessee Walking Horses, although is rarer in breeds such as the Thoroughbred and Standardbred. Most horses are 5–15 years of age when they develop laminitis that can be attributed to EMS.

== Clinical signs ==
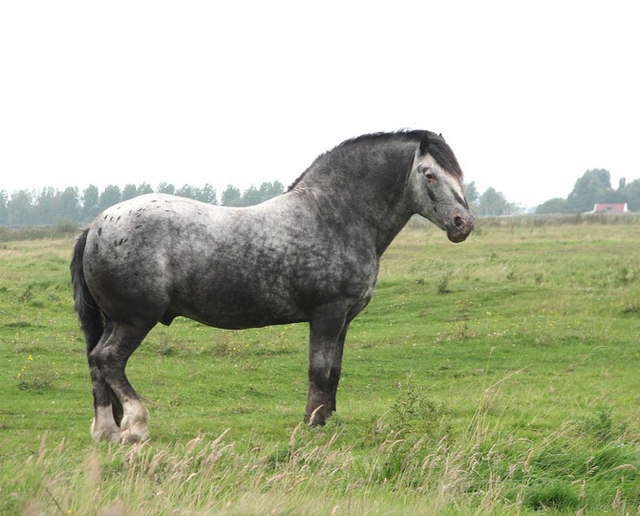
Excessive fat in the crest of the neck, and areas of the shoulder and flank, are suggestive of EMS.

EMS horses tend to become obese very easily, depositing fat in the crest, shoulders, loin, above the eyes, around the tail head, and the mammary glands or prepuce, even when the rest of the body appears to be in normal condition. Some horses may have regional adiposity, and others may even appear normal weight, so obesity is not a definitive clinical sign of a horse with EMS. Horses will be insulin resistant (IR), and may have hyperinsulinemia, have abnormal blood glucose, or abnormal insulin responses to glucose. IR predisposes the animal to laminitis, and horses with EMS may have had previous episodes in their history.

Other signs suggesting EMS include elevated blood triglyceride levels and leptin levels, hypertension, and reproductive changes in mares (an increased diestrus period, and a lack of anestrus). Horses also occasionally show anemia and elevated gamma-glutamyl transpeptidase (GGT) levels.

=== Differentiation from pituitary pars intermedia dysfunction ===
EMS shares similarities to pituitary pars intermedia dysfunction (also known as equine Cushing's disease), which also causes regional adiposity, laminitis, and sometimes insulin resistance. Treatment and management differ between the conditions, making it important to distinguish between the two. However, both diseases may occur simultaneously; horses with EMS may develop PPID.

EMS vs PPID
	EMS	PPID
Age of onset	5–15 years	15+ years
Clinical signs	Resistance to weight loss	Hirsutism, increased drinking and urination, muscle atrophy
Serum ACTH levels	Normal	Elevated

== Diagnosis ==
Diagnosis is based on history, clinical signs, and diagnostic tests.

Glucose levels alone are insufficient to diagnose EMS. Many EMS horses will effectively compensate their insulin response even with insulin resistance, maintaining a blood glucose within normal limits, although usually at the high end of normal. Other factors, such as stress, feeding, inflammation, or administration of α-2 agonist drugs such as xylazine and detomidine, can falsely raise blood glucose levels. Horses with persistent hyperglycemia may have type II diabetes.

Insulin normally increases after feeding, as well as secondary to cortisol (stress) and epinephrine (pain), so measurement should be avoided if any of these conditions are present. Actively laminitic horses should therefore not undergo testing until their pain and stress have been adequately controlled. Additionally, resting insulin levels may not be increased in all animal with EMS. For these reasons, dynamic tests are recommended for the diagnosis of EMS.

Measurement of fasting insulin concentration involves giving a horse a single flake of hay, low in non-structural carbohydrates, at 10 pm the night before testing. Blood being drawn the following morning, usually between 8 and 10 am. Both insulin and glucose blood levels are measured. Hyperinsulinemia suggests insulin resistance. This test is easy to perform, but is less sensitive than the oral sugar test. It is best used in cases where risks of laminitis make the oral sugar test potentially unsafe.

The oral sugar test also requires giving the horse only a single flake of hay at 10pm the night before the test. The following morning, karo corn syrup is given orally, and glucose and insulin levels are measured at 60 and 90 minutes after administration. Normal or excessively high insulin levels are diagnostic. However, equivocal test results require retesting at a later date, or performing a different test. A similar test is available outside the US, in areas where corn-syrup products are less readily available, where horses are given a morning meal of chaff with dextrose powder, and blood insulin levels are measured 2 hours later.

Dynamic testing for insulin has higher sensitivity test than fasting insulin concentration, because insulin resistance may only become evident when challenged by hyperglycemia. There are various tests available for measuring changes in insulin concentration. They usually require a similar fasting protocol as the fasting insulin test.

- A glucose tolerance test requires IV or oral administration of a sugar. Multiple blood draws are then performed to measure blood glucose and insulin levels over time. The area under this curve is the best indicator of insulin resistance, but it may also be evaluated just based on the peak value and time to return to baseline.
- The combined glucose-insulin test requires less time to perform than the glucose tolerance test. It involves a baseline blood draw, followed by an IV injection of dextrose, and then an injection of insulin. Blood glucose is measured every 10–15 minutes over the course of 2.5 hours. Samples are evaluated for time to return to baseline blood glucose levels, and insulin blood concentration. Elevated insulin concentration suggest insulin resistance. Rarely, this test can result in hypoglycemia, which requires administration of IV dextrose to correct.

== Treatment ==
The main goals of treatment involve methods to induce weight loss. This may be accomplished through dietary changes, exercise, and medical management.

=== Diet ===
Dietary management involves reducing both the digestible energy levels and the total non-structural carbohydrate (NSC) level of feed. NSC include starches, single sugars, and fructans, whereas cellulose and hemicelluloses are structural carbohydrates. High NSC levels cause a glucose and insulin spike following feeding, and may worsen insulin resistance. Current recommendations for NSC levels are less than 10% of the diet on a dry matter basis.

Pasture is often eliminated from the diet, since digestible energy levels from grazing are not easily measured and pasture carbohydrates can trigger laminitis. It may be introduced back into the diet following improvement of insulin sensitivity. In horses with mild insulin resistance, this is often the case once obesity is resolved. However, pasture access should be restricted to those times of day when grass NSC levels are lowest, such as early morning, and never following a frost, which stresses the grass and results in accumulation of water-soluble carbohydrates. Horses are best managed by only allowing short grazing periods—less than 1 hour since they can rapidly ingest grass, or confining them to a limited turn-out area or by use of a grazing muzzle. Horses with severe IR, that have recurrent laminitis, are not recommended to return to pasture.

Hay low in NSC is provided in place of pasture. Ideally, hay should be tested and purchased based on known NSC levels, only using hays less than 10% NSC. Hays higher than 10% NSC may be used, but it is recommended to soak it for at least one hour before feeding in cold water, which can help reduce NSC levels, although this method is not always a reliable way to adequately drop them to acceptable levels. Obese horses are usually fed hay at a level of 1.5% ideal body weight, which may be dropped to 1% of body weight if no weight loss is realized after 30 days. However, feeding less than 1% of body weight in forage is not recommended, since secondary problems such as hyperlipemia and stereotypies can occur, and insulin resistance may actually be worsened.

Removal of concentrates from the diet may be sufficient to produce weight loss in obese horses. Hays are often low in vitamin A, vitamin E, copper, zinc, and selenium. A vitamin and mineral supplement is added to the diet to ensure adequate nutrition. Ration balancers, which are low in calories but offer protein, vitamins, and minerals, are often recommended.

=== Exercise ===
Exercise has been shown to improve insulin sensitivity in humans with metabolic syndrome. Increased exercise is therefore recommended in horses with EMS, assuming laminitis does not restrict activity levels. Current recommendations include 2–3 sessions a week, of 20–30 minutes of work, with gradual increase in duration and intensity.

=== Medical management ===
Medical management is usually reserved for horses that do not adequately respond to diet and exercise alone. The two most commonly used drugs for EMS are metformin and levothyroxine sodium.

Metformin is a drug used in humans for type II diabetes, and has been shown to improve insulin sensitivity and reduce output of glucose by the liver. However, it has low bioavailability in horses, and does not appear to affect insulin sensitivity at doses that are commonly used. Its current mechanism of action in horses is thought to be a reduction in intestinal glucose absorption, and therefore postprandial glucose levels, when it is given before meals.

Levothyroxine, a T4 analogue, improves insulin sensitivity and weight loss in horses. After desired body weight has been reached, horses are slowly weaned off the drug. Although it does not appear to produce signs of hyperthyroidism in horses, safety of long-term usage has not been evaluated.

== See also ==
- Henneke horse body condition scoring system
