= Beet pulp =

Byproduct of beet processing

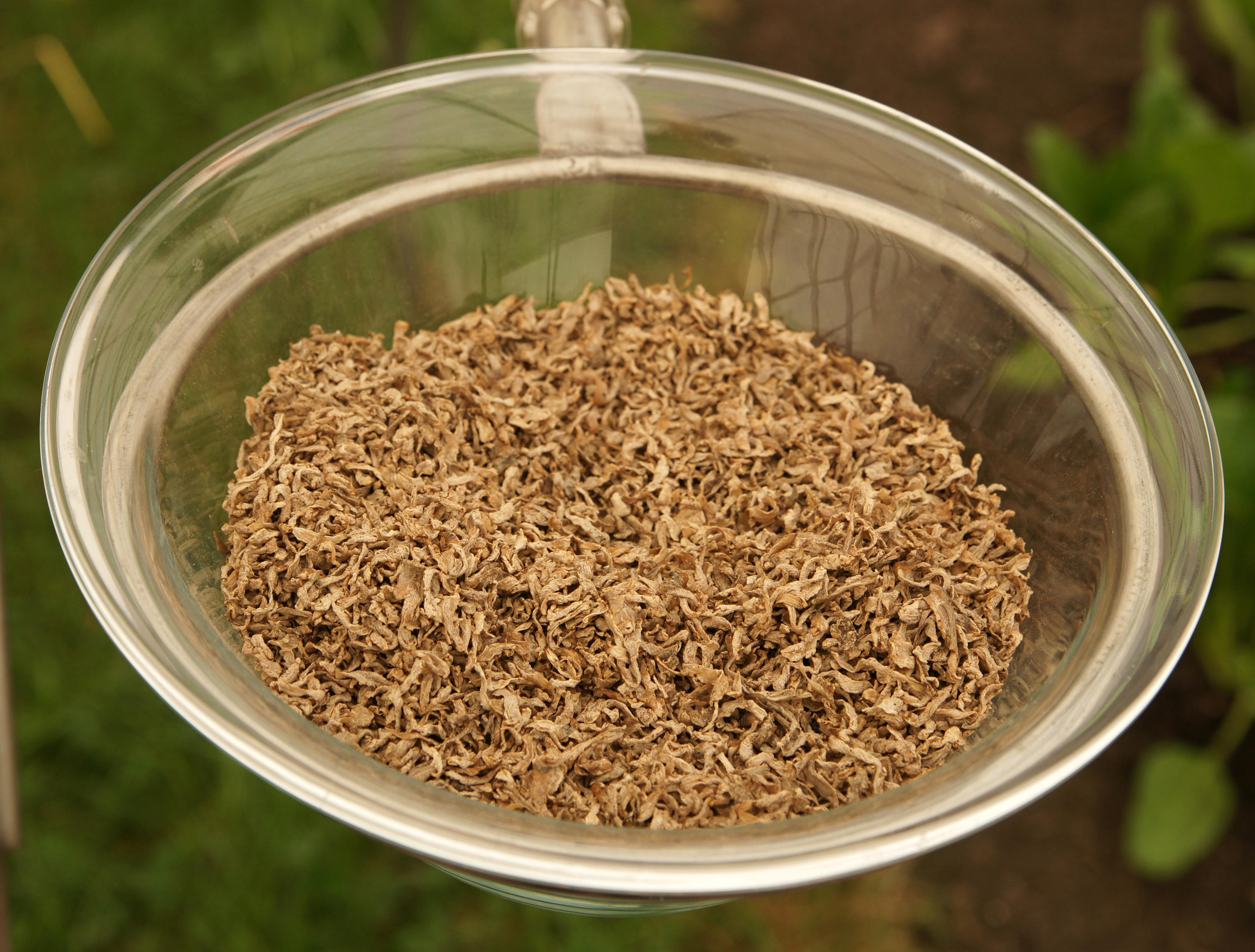
Beet pulp in dried flake form.

Beet pulp is a byproduct from the processing of sugar beet which is used as fodder for horses and other livestock. Beet pulp is the fibrous material left over after the sugar is extracted from sugar beets. It is supplied either as dried flakes or as compressed pellets. There is a belief that it needs to be soaked in water before feeding to horses, but research does not support soaking being an absolute necessity.

== Composition ==
Despite being a byproduct of sugar beet processing, beet pulp itself is low in sugar and other non-structural carbohydrates, but high in energy and fiber. Among other nutrients, it contains 10 percent protein, 0.8 percent calcium and 0.5 percent phosphorus. It has no Vitamin A, so additional forage or supplementation is required to provide complete nutrition.

8,5'-Diferulic acid is the predominant diferulic acid in sugar beet pulp.

Sometimes molasses is added to improve palatability.

== Feeding ==
Beet pulp is usually fed to horses in addition to hay, but occasionally is a replacement for hay when fed to very old horses who can no longer chew properly. A standard ration of beet pulp for horses is usually 2 to 5 pounds (1 to 2.5 kg) dry weight. Before feeding to horses, beet pulp is usually soaked in water, at a ratio of one part pulp to about four parts water. The maximum amount of water is absorbed after three to four hours, but it may be soaked for as little as one to two hours, especially in hot weather when there is a risk of fermentation. Most commercial feeds designed for geriatric horses contain large amounts of beet pulp and are fed straight out of the bag without being soaked, and manufacturer's directions generally recommend giving such feeds dry unless the horse has dental issues that make chewing difficult.

Beet pulp is not usually soaked before feeding to cattle, sheep and goats. Dehydrated beet pulp has a good nutritive value for ruminants. It is also fed to poultry, pigs and rabbits. Beet pulp can also be fed wet, pressed or ensiled.

== Safety issues ==
Some horse owners express two concerns about feeding dry, unsoaked beet pulp, one being that it is linked to choke. Any dry feed may cause choke, especially if the horse does not have free access to water, or if the horse has other risk factors linked to choking, such as a tendency to bolt its food. However, while horses have choked on beet pulp, university studies have not documented that beet pulp is a particular problem. It is believed that choke related to beet pulp is linked to the particle size and the horse's aggressive feeding behaviour, rather than the actual feed itself. Nonetheless, the risk of choke associated with any dry feed, including beet pulp, can be reduced by soaking the ration prior to feeding.

Another concern expressed by horse owners is that dry beet pulp will absorb water and swell in a horse's stomach, causing digestive problems such as impaction or colic. However, a properly hydrated horse usually produces enough saliva to moisten any feedstuff properly, including beet pulp.

Thus, while research indicates that soaking beet pulp is not necessary to prevent, there are other reasons for soaking beet pulp. It may make the feed easier to chew, particularly for older horses with bad teeth. Soaking may improve the taste, and may be a way to hide supplements or medications. While horses usually drink enough water on their own, feeding soaked beet pulp can increase fluid intake, particularly in the winter when horses may drink less water than they need.

== See also ==
- Equine nutrition
