= List of cattle terminology =

Many terms are used for cattle of different ages and sexes. In general, the same words are used in different parts of the world, but with minor differences in the definitions. The terminology described here contrasts the differences in definition between the United Kingdom and other British-influenced parts of the world such as Canada, Australia, New Zealand, Ireland and the United States.

== Cattle by age, sex, and condition ==
Age and Sex

- Young bovines (regardless of sex) are called calves until they are weaned, then weaners until they are a year old in some areas; in other areas, particularly with male beef bovines, they may be known as feeder calves or feeders. After that, they are referred to as yearlings or stirks if between one and two years of age.
  - Feeder cattle or store cattle are young bovines soon to be either backgrounded or sent to fattening, most especially those intended to be sold to someone else for finishing before butchering. In some regions, a distinction between stockers and feeders (by those names) is the distinction of backgrounding versus immediate sale to a finisher.
  - In North America, a young male calf is referred to as a bullock.
  - A young female before she has had a calf of her own and who is under three years of age is called a heifer (/ˈhɛfər/ HEF-ər).
    - A young female cow that has had only one calf is occasionally called a first-calf heifer. Heiferettes are either first-calf heifers or a subset thereof without potential to become lineage dams, depending on whose definition is regionally operative.
- Adult bovines are called cattle.
  - An "intact" (i.e., not castrated) adult male is called a bull.
    - A father bull is called a sire with reference to his offspring, such as in the herd book or purebred records.
  - An adult female that has had her first calf (or second calf, depending upon regional usage) is called a cow. Steers and heifers can sometimes be colloquially referred to as "cows", especially by non-agricultural people who are not familiar with the appropriate terminology.
    - A mother cow can be called a dam with reference to her offspring, especially in the breeding records or purebred registrations. Often, mentions of dams imply cows which will be kept in the herd for repeated breeding (as opposed to heifers or cows to be sold off sooner).

Condition

The castration of cattle is popular, for the purpose of making the cattle hormonally mellow and easy to control, which in turn makes them suitable to be beasts of burden.

- In some countries, an incompletely castrated male is known also as a rig.
- In the United States, A castrated male is called a steer.
  - Older steers are sometimes called bullocks in other parts of the world, but in North America this term refers only to a young bull.
    - A castrated male steer—occasionally a female, or in some areas an intact bull that is trained and kept for draft or riding purposes—is called an ox (plural oxen); ox may also be used to refer to some carcass products from any adult cattle, such as ox-hide, ox-blood, oxtail, or ox-liver.
      - In North America (such as the United States and Canada), draft cattle under four years old are often called working steers.
    - Improper or late castration on a bull results in it becoming a coarse steer known as a stag in Australia, Canada and New Zealand.
- In Australia, the term Japanese ox is used for grain-fed steers in the weight range of 500 to 650 kg that are destined for the Japanese meat trade.
- A springer is a cow or heifer that is close to calving.
- In all cattle species, a female twin of a bull usually becomes infertile due to intrauterine exposure to high testosterone levels. She is functionally a partial intersex, and is commonly called a freemartin.
- In the United States and Canada, an unbranded bovine of either sex is called a maverick.
  - In Australia, A wild, young, unmarked bull is known as a micky or micky bull.
    - Piker bullocks are micky bulls (uncastrated young male bulls) that were caught, castrated and then were later lost.
- Neat (horned oxen, from which neatsfoot oil is derived), beef (young ox) and beefing (young animal fit for slaughtering) are obsolete terms, although poll, pollard and polled cattle are still terms in use for naturally hornless animals, or in some areas also for those that have been disbudded or dehorned.
- Cattle raised specifically for human consumption are called beef cattle. Within the American beef cattle industry, the older term beef (plural beeves) is still used to refer to an animal of either sex. Some Australian, Canadian, New Zealand and British people use the term beast.
- Cattle bred specifically for milk production are called milking or dairy cattle; a cow kept to provide milk for one family may be called a family cow or a milker. A fresh cow is a dairy term for a cow (or a first-calf heifer in few regions) who has recently given birth, or "freshened."
- The adjective applying to cattle in general is usually bovine. The terms bull, cow and calf are also used by extension to denote the sex or age of other large animals, including whales, hippopotamus, camels, elk and elephants.
- Various other terms for cattle or types thereof are historical; these include nowt, nolt, mart, and others.

== Cattle and cow ==
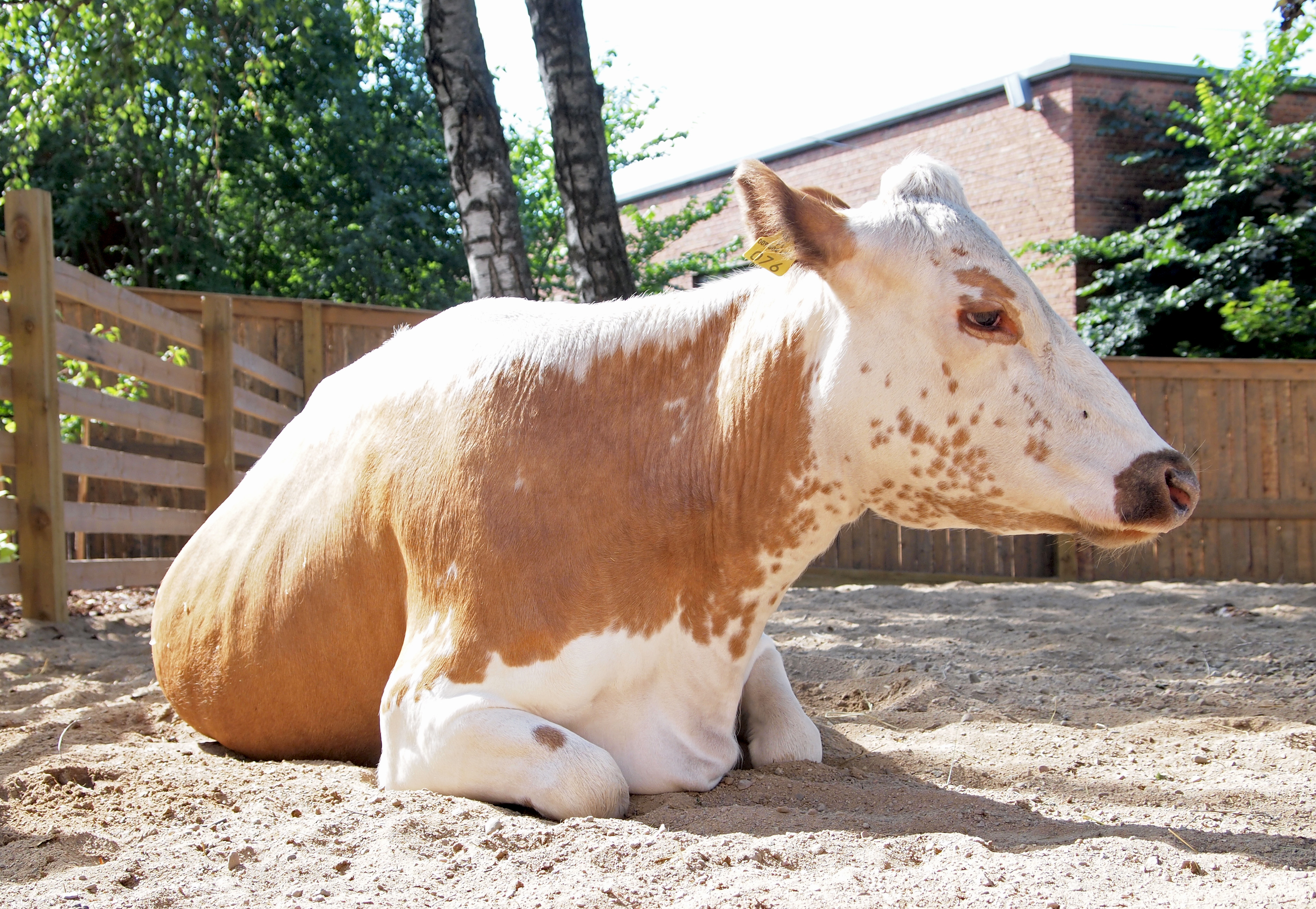
A Finncattle at Särkänniemi in Tampere, Finland

"Cattle" is mostly used in the plural and occasionally in the singular; it is a plurale tantum. Thus one may refer to "three cattle" or "some cattle", but not "one cattle". "One head of cattle" is a valid though periphrastic way to refer to one animal of indeterminate or unknown age and sex; otherwise no universally used single-word singular form of cattle exists in modern English, other than the sex- and age-specific terms such as cow, bull, steer and heifer. Historically, "ox" was not a sex-specific term for adult cattle, but generally this is now used only for working cattle, especially adult castrated males. The term is also incorporated into the names of other species, such as the musk ox and "grunting ox" (yak), and is used in some areas to describe certain cattle products such as ox-hide and oxtail.

The term Cattle was borrowed from Anglo-Norman catel, itself from medieval Latin capitale 'principal sum of money, capital', itself derived in turn from Latin caput 'head'. Cattle originally meant movable personal property, especially livestock of any kind, as opposed to real property (the land, which also included wild or small free-roaming animals such as chickens—they were sold as part of the land). The word is a variant of chattel (a unit of personal property) and closely related to capital in the economic sense.

The word cow came via Anglo-Saxon cū (plural cȳ), from Common Indo-European *gʷōus (genitive *gʷowés) 'a bovine animal', cf. Persian: gâv, Sanskrit: go-, Welsh: buwch. The plural cȳ became ki or kie in Middle English, and an additional plural ending was often added, giving kine, kien, but also kies, kuin and others. This is the origin of the now archaic English plural, kine. The Scots language singular is coo or cou, and the plural is kye.

In older English sources such as the King James Version of the Bible, cattle refers to livestock, as opposed to deer which refers to wildlife. Wild cattle may refer to feral cattle or to undomesticated species of the genus Bos. When used without a qualifier, the modern meaning of cattle is usually restricted to domesticated bovines.

Cow is in general use as a singular for the collective cattle. The word cow is easy to use when a singular is needed and the sex is unknown or irrelevant—when "there is a cow in the road", for example. Further, any herd of fully mature cattle in or near a pasture is statistically likely to consist mostly of cows, so the term is probably accurate even in the restrictive sense. Other than the few bulls needed for breeding, the vast majority of male cattle are castrated as calves and are used as oxen or slaughtered for meat before the age of three years. Thus, in a pastured herd, any calves or herd bulls usually are clearly distinguishable from the cows due to distinctively different sizes and clear anatomical differences. Merriam-Webster and Oxford Living Dictionaries recognize the sex-nonspecific use of cow as an alternate definition, whereas Collins and the OED do not.

Colloquially, more general nonspecific terms may denote cattle when a singular form is needed. Head of cattle is usually used only after a numeral. Australian, New Zealand and British farmers use the term beast or cattle beast. Bovine is also used in Britain. The term critter is common in the western United States and Canada, particularly when referring to young cattle. In some areas of the American South (particularly the Appalachian region), where both dairy and beef cattle are present, an individual animal was once called a "beef critter", though that term is becoming archaic.

== Other terminology ==
Cattle raised for human consumption are called beef cattle. Within the beef cattle industry in parts of the United States, the term beef (plural beeves) is still used in its archaic sense to refer to an animal of either sex. Cows of certain breeds that are kept for the milk they give are called dairy cows or milking cows (formerly milch cows). Most young male offspring of dairy cows are sold for veal, and may be referred to as veal calves.

The term dogies is used to describe orphaned calves in the context of ranch work in the American West, as in "Keep them dogies moving". In some places, a cow kept to provide milk for one family is called a "house cow". Other obsolete terms for cattle include "neat" (this use survives in "neatsfoot oil", extracted from the feet and legs of cattle), and "beefing" (young animal fit for slaughter).

A cow's "moo"

An onomatopoeic term for one of the most common sounds made by cattle is moo (also called lowing). There are a number of other sounds made by cattle, including calves bawling, and bulls bellowing. Bawling is most common for cows after weaning of a calf. The bullroarer makes a sound similar to a bull's territorial call.
