= Pituitary pars intermedia dysfunction =

Endocrine disease of horses

Pituitary pars intermedia dysfunction (PPID), or equine Cushing's disease, is an endocrine disease affecting the pituitary gland of horses. It is most commonly seen in older animals, and is classically associated with the formation of a long, wavy coat (hirsutism) and chronic laminitis.

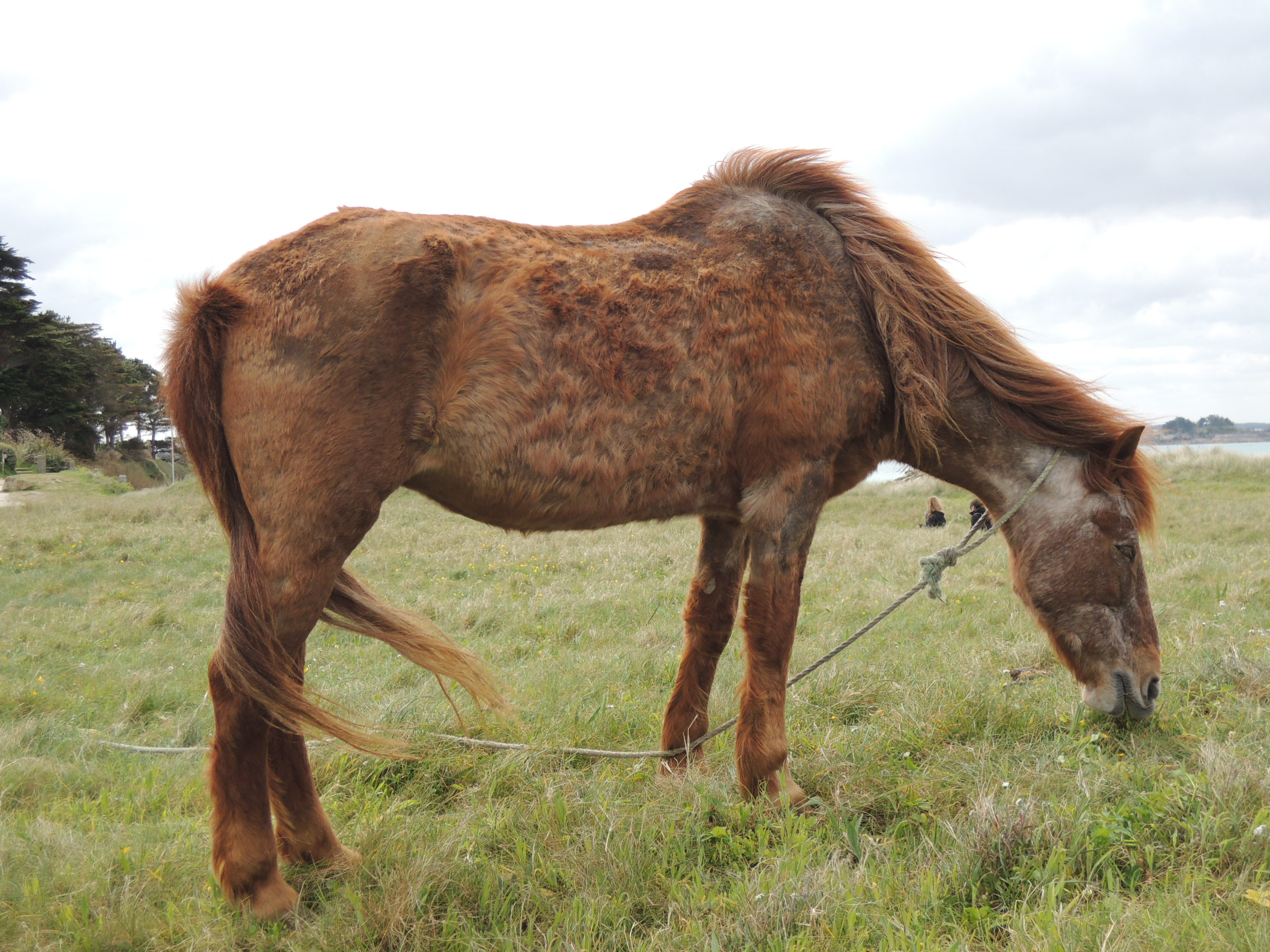
Cushing's disease commonly causes hirsutism, muscle wasting along the top line, and abnormal fat distribution.

== Pathophysiology ==
Unlike the human and canine forms of Cushing's disease, which most commonly affect the pars distalis region of the pituitary gland, equine Cushing's disease is a result of hyperplasia or adenoma formation in the pars intermedia. This adenoma then secretes excessive amounts of normal products, leading to clinical signs.

=== Dopaminergic control of the pars intermedia ===
The pituitary gland consists of three parts: the pars nervosa, the pars intermedia, and the pars distalis. The most critical structure to PPID, the pars intermedia, is regulated by the hypothalamus. The neurons of the hypothalamus innervate cells known as melanotropes within the pars intermedia, releasing dopamine which then binds to dopamine receptors on the melanotropes. The activation of these dopamine receptors leads to the inhibition of proopiomelanocortin (POMC) production in these cells.

In PPID-affected horses, dopamine is not produced from these neurons, leading to dopamine levels about 10% of the level normally found in the pars intermedia. This is thought to be due to neurodegeneration of the neurons, secondary to free radical formation and oxidative stress. Without regulation from dopamine, the pars intermedia develops hyperplasia and adenoma formation, leading to gross enlargement and excessive production of POMC. These adenomas also have the potential to compress the hypothalamus and optic chiasm.

=== POMC ===
POMC produced from the melanotropes of the pars intermedia is cleaved into adrenocorticotropic hormone (ACTH) and β-lipotropin (β-LPH). The majority of ACTH is then cleaved into α-MSH and corticotropin-like intermediate peptide (CLIP). CLIP is thought to have an influence on subsequent insulin resistance that can be seen in PPID horses.

ACTH is also produced by corticotropes in the pars distalis of the equine pituitary. In a normal horse, this accounts for the majority of ACTH production. ACTH produced by the pars distalis is subject to negative feedback in a normal horse, so high cortisol levels reduce ACTH production by the pituitary, subsequently reducing cortisol levels. In a horse with PPID, ACTH levels are high as a result of pars intermedia production, but it is not subject to negative feedback regulation. Despite the high levels of ACTH, cortisol levels vary, and are sometimes lower than normal. Additionally, hyperplasia of the adrenal cortex is infrequent. The role of ACTH is, therefore, still poorly understood.

== Age and breed prevalence ==
PPID has been diagnosed in horses as young as 7 years old, although most horses are first diagnosed at ages 19 to 20. An estimated 21% of horses older than 15 years have PPID. All breeds may develop PPID, but pony breeds and Morgans seem to be more commonly affected.

== Clinical signs ==
Many signs are associated with PPID, but only a subset of these is displayed in any single horse. Some horses may present with chronic laminitis without other overt signs of the disease.

- Hypertrichosis (hirsutism) produces a long, thick, wavy coat that often has delayed shedding or fails to shed completely, and may lighten in color. Hirsutism has been suggested to be pathognomonic for PPID, with up to 95% of horses having PPID.
- Laminitis
- Increased drinking and increased urination
- Pot-bellied appearance
- Weight loss
- Redistribution of fat, leading to bulging supraorbital fat pad, a "cresty" neck, and fat over the tail head or in the sheath of males
- Lethargy
- Behavioral changes, often an increased docility
- Muscle wasting, especially along the top line
- Increased sweating, or less commonly, decreased sweating
- Increased appetite
- Decreased sensitivity to pain
- Recurrent infections due to immune impairment
- Rarely neurologic signs such as narcolepsy, blindness, or seizures
- Suspensary ligament degeneration

=== Laboratory findings ===
Complete blood counts and serum chemistry profiles may be normal in affected horses. Persistent hyperglycemia and glucosuria are very commonly seen. Hyperlipidemia may be present, especially in ponies. Other abnormalities associated with the disease include mild anemia, neurophilia, lymphopenia, eosinopenia, and increased liver enzymes.

=== Differentiating from equine metabolic syndrome ===
PPID is a distinct syndrome from equine metabolic syndrome (EMS), although the two syndromes often can be present in the same horse. Horses with PPID are at risk for developing EMS, and horses with EMS may develop PPID with age, so both diseases may occur simultaneously.

Horses affected with PPID and without EMS do not tend to have the regional adiposity and may not have an increased risk of laminitis. However, horses with both PPID and EMS tend to have an increased risk for laminitis compared to horses with EMS alone. Treatment and management differs between the two endocrinopathies, making differentiation important.

EMS vs PPID
	EMS	PPID
Age of Onset	5-15 years	15+ years
Clinical signs	Resistance to weight loss	Hirsutism, increased drinking and urination, muscle atrophy
Serum ACTH levels	Normal	Elevated

== Diagnosis ==
=== Plasma ACTH concentration ===
This test may also be referred to as a ‘’resting ACTH’’, ’’endogenous ACTH’’, or ‘’basal ACTH’’. The majority of ACTH produced in normal horses comes from corticotrope cells in the pars distalis, with only 2% thought to come from melanotropes in the pars intermedia. In horses with PPID, melanotropes produce abnormally high concentrations of ACTH. Basal plasma ACTH concentrations, which measure the blood levels of circulating ACTH, can therefore be useful in diagnosing the disease.

ACTH levels naturally fluctuate in healthy horses, with a significant rise occurring the in autumn (August through October) in North American horses. Horses with PPID have a similar, but much more significant, rise in the autumn. Therefore, a seasonally adjusted reference range must be used that correlates with the time of year the sample is taken. Failure to use a seasonally adjusted reference range may lead to false-positive results in normal horses if they are sampled in the fall. Autumnal testing was thought to be more sensitive and specific than testing at other times of the year; however, this concept has been recently challenged. Basal plasma ACTH levels may increase if the horse is severely ill or under great stress or pain, such as if it has laminitis. However, such events must be fairly significant to confound the results. Additionally, ACTH levels may not be significantly increased early on in the disease, leading to false negatives.

=== Thyrotropin-releasing hormone stimulation test ===
Thyrotropin-releasing hormone (TRH) receptors are present in both the melanotropes of the pars intermedia and the corticotropes in the pars distalis. The administration of exogenous TRH causes an increase in ACTH and α-MSH in plasma of both normal horses and those with PPID. In both cases, plasma ACTH peaks 2–10 minutes after administration, before slowly dropping to normal levels over the course of an hour. PPID horses, however, show a much greater peak than normal horses, especially in the autumn. The test is relatively simple, involving one blood sample taken before TRH administration, and one 10 minutes or 30 minutes following TRH.

TRH is currently not licensed for use in horses, and can cause various side effects, including yawning, flehmen, muscle trembling, and coughing. This test is thought to have greater sensitivity than other tests, but has drawbacks including cost, TRH availability, limited repeatability and lack of defined seasonal reference intervals. Due to a lack of seasonal references, it is only recommended for use from December until June.

=== Dexamethasone suppression test ===
The dexamethasone suppression test involves administering dexamethasone, a synthetic glucocorticoid, to the horse, and measuring its serum cortisol levels before and 19–24 hours after injection. In a normal horse, dexamethasone administration results in negative feedback to the pituitary, resulting in decreased ACTH production from the pars distalis and, therefore, decreased synthesis of cortisol at the level of the adrenal gland. A horse with PPID, which has an overactive pars intermedia not regulated by glucocorticoid levels, does not suppress ACTH production and, therefore, cortisol levels remain high. False negatives can occur in early disease. Additionally, dexamethasone administration may increase the risk of laminitis in horses already prone to the disease. For these reasons, the dexamethasone suppression test is currently not recommended for PPID testing.

=== Urinary corticoid-to-creatinine ratio ===
Although corticoid-to-creatinine ratios are generally higher in horses with PPID, numerous false positives and false negatives occur with this test, so it is not recommended.

=== Plasma cortisol concentration ===
Resting plasma cortisol may be slightly elevated in affected horses, but is commonly within normal limits or below normal. Additionally, elevations may occur secondary to stress, concurrent disease, and due to individual variation. Therefore, resting cortisol levels alone are not adequate to diagnose or rule out the presence of PPID.

=== Current recommendations for testing ===
Horses suspected of having PPID should undergo testing both for the disease and for insulin dysfunction (see below). Horses showing obvious signs of PPID will likely have a positive endogenous ACTH test. Horses with early disease may produce a false-negative result. In these horses, the thyrotropin-releasing hormone stimulation test should either be used as an initial screening test, or to confirm a false resting ACTH.

== Insulin dysregulation ==
Insulin dysregulation is commonly seen in horses with PPID or equine metabolic syndrome. It is of interest primarily because of its link to laminitis. Horses with ID will have an increased insulin response after they are given oral sugars, which will cause a subsequent rise in blood insulin levels, or hyperinsulinemia. Hyperinsulinemia results in decreased tissue sensitivity to insulin, or insulin resistance especially by the skeletal muscle, liver and adipose tissue. Tissue insulin resistance causes increased insulin secretion, which perpetuates the cycle.

The trigger to insulin resistance is not fully understood. Genetics is likely to have some impact on the risk of postprandial hyperinsulinemia. Obesity, pregnancy, PPID, and inflammatory states may contribute to tissue insulin resistance. PPID is thought to result in increased insulin secretion due to higher levels of CLIP produced by melanotrophs, and to cause insulin resistance secondary to hyperadrenocorticism.

=== Testing for insulin dysregulation ===
Due to the strong link between PPID and insulin resistance, testing is recommended for all horses suspected or confirmed to be suffering from PPID. There are two tests commonly used for insulin resistance: the oral sugar test and fasting insulin blood concentration.

The fasting insulin concentration involves giving a horse a single flake of hay at 10 pm the night before testing, with blood being drawn the following morning. Both insulin and glucose blood levels are measured. Hyperinsulinemia suggests insulin resistance, but normal or low fasting insulin does not rule out PPID. This test is easy to perform, but is less sensitive than the oral sugar test. It is best used in cases where risks of laminitis make the oral sugar test potentially unsafe.

The oral sugar test also requires giving the horse only a single flake of hay at 10pm the night before the test. The following morning, karo corn syrup is given orally, and glucose and insulin levels are measured at 60 and 90 minutes after administration. Normal or excessively high insulin levels are diagnostic. However, equivocal test results require retesting at a later date, or performing a different test. A similar test is available outside the US, in areas where corn-syrup products are less readily available, where horses are given a morning meal of chaff with dextrose powder, and blood insulin levels are measured 2 hours later.

=== Management of insulin resistance ===
The main methods of management involve exercise and diet change, in addition to treatment of PPID. The primary goal is reduction of weight in an obese animal. Diet changes include limiting pasture access and reducing or eliminating grain. Obese animals are often best maintained on a diet consisting of ration balancer and hay, fed at 1.5% body weight and decreased if needed. Feed should be selected based on low nonstructural carbohydrate (NSC) levels. Hay NSC levels may be reduced by soaking it in cold water for 30 minutes.

Exercise is increased in nonlaminitic horses. Animals resistant to weight loss, despite diet and exercise changes, can be placed on levothyroxine to increase metabolism. Metformin can also be used to reduce glucose absorption through the intestinal tract.

== Treatment ==
The primary treatment of PPID is pergolide, a dopamine agonist that provides suppression to the pars intermedia in place of the dysfunctional hypothalamus. Horses should be reassessed in 30 days following the start of treatment, through evaluation of clinical signs and by baseline diagnostic testing, to ensure the appropriate dose is being prescribed. Results from that test dictate changes in dose. Horses that are responding to treatment should be retested every 6 months, including a test in the autumn when a seasonal increase in ACTH occurs, to ensure their ACTH levels are appropriately suppressed during this time. Drug side effects include a transient decrease in appetite, typically seen when first introducing the medication or increasing the dose, which can be reduced by slowly increasing the dose to therapeutic levels, and by breaking up the daily dose into twice-daily administrations.

Attitude, activity levels, hyperglycemia, and increased drinking and urination are usually improved within 30 days of initiating treatment. Other clinical signs, such as hirsutism, potbellied appearance, muscle wasting, laminitic episodes, and increased predisposition to infection, usually take between 30 days and a year to improve.

Cyproheptadine may be added to the treatment regimen in horses that are inadequately responding to pergolide, but is usually only used in horses with advanced PPID on high doses of pergolide.

== See also ==
- Henneke horse body condition scoring system
- Horse body mass
- Geriatric horses
