= Henneke horse body condition scoring system =

Horse health scale

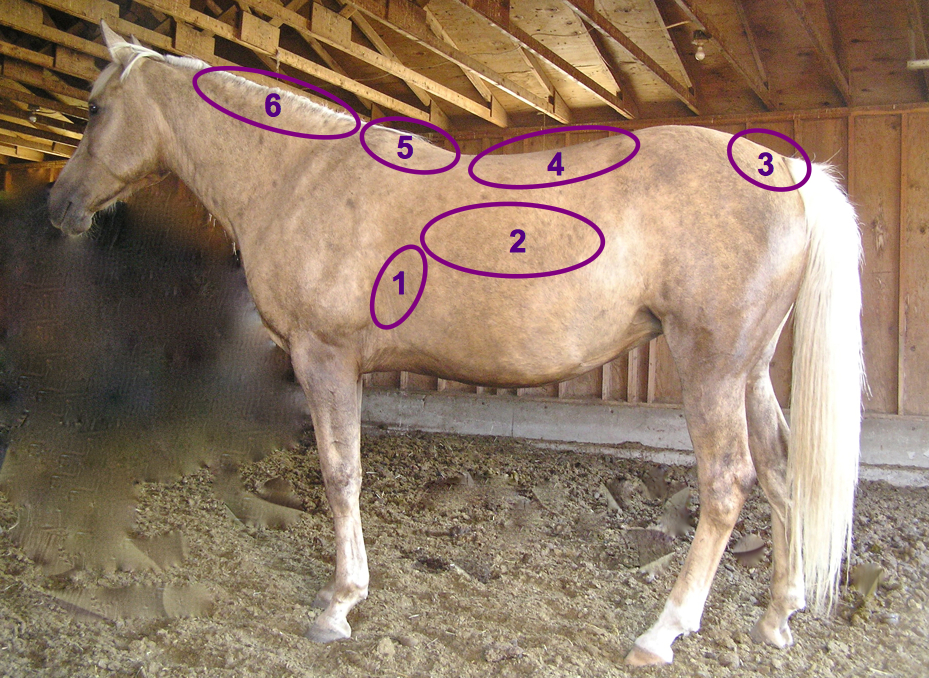
Location and order of accumulation of fat deposits in a horse: This horse is moderately overweight, but without significant fat deposits, score 6.

The Henneke horse body condition scoring system is a numerical scale used to evaluate the amount of fat on a horse's body. It was developed in the early 1980s by Don Henneke at Texas A&M University with the goal of creating a universal scale to assess horses' bodyweight, and was first published in 1983. It is a standardized system that can be used across all breeds without specialized equipment; condition is assessed visually and by palpation. Scores range from 1 to 9 with 1 being poor and 9 being extremely fat; the ideal range for most horses is from 4 to 6. The system is based on both visual appraisal and palpable fat cover of the six major points of the horse. The system is used by law-enforcement agencies as an objective method of scoring a horse's body condition in horse cruelty cases.

The concept of a body condition score (BCS) has been adapted for other livestock, especially cattle, both for living animals and for carcass grade. Obesity in cats and dogs can be relatively easily diagnosed this way.

== Scoring system ==
The Henneke scale describes body condition scores as follows:

Score	Description	Definition	Image
1	Poor	Extremely emaciated; no fatty tissue; vertebrae, ribs, tail head, and bones of withers, shoulder, and neck are visible	
2	Very thin	Emaciated; slight tissue cover over bones; vertebrae, ribs, tail head, and bones of withers, shoulder, and neck are visible	
3	Thin	Slight fat cover over body; individual vertebrae and ribs no longer visibly discernible; withers, shoulders, and neck do not appear overly thin	
4	Moderately thin	Ridge of spine and outline of ribs are visible; tail head may or may not be visible depending on the breed; withers, shoulders, and neck do not appear overly thin	
5	Moderate	Spine and ribs cannot be seen however ribs can be felt; tail head is spongy; withers, shoulders, and neck are rounded and smooth	
6	Moderately fleshy	Slight crease down spine; ribs and tail head feel spongy; fat deposits along withers and neck and behind shoulders	
7	Fleshy	Crease down spine; ribs have fat filling between them; tail head spongy; fat deposits along withers and neck and behind shoulders	
8	Fat	Apparent crease down spine; ribs difficult to feel; soft fat surrounding tail head; fat deposits along withers, behind shoulders, and on inner thighs; neck is large	
9	Extremely fat	Obvious crease down spine; patchy fat on ribs; bulging fat on tail head, withers, behind shoulders, and on neck; fat fills in flank and on inner thighs	

== Ideal scores ==
The average horse is healthiest with a body condition score between 4 and 6 (breed dependent), which indicates that the horse has a proper balance of feed to exercise. An easy keeper or hard keeper should be watched closely as it is prone to either being overweight or underweight, respectively.

=== Breeding mares ===
Breeding mares with a body condition score less than 5 have been linked in research to problems with reproduction. The energy demands of milk production for a foal are very high, so most mares lose condition while lactating. Also, a mare with a body condition score less than 5 has more difficulty conceiving. For these reasons, recommendations are for breeding mares to score between 6 and 7. Higher body condition scores have not been shown to affect reproduction, but are unhealthy for the horse.

=== Stallions ===
Stallions have the best reproductive success at a body condition score of 5 or 6. Stallions have a high energy output during breeding season, so some advise a stallion begin the breeding season at a 6 or 7 to keep him within the healthy range at the end of the breeding season. If a stallion has a body condition score less than 3 or greater than 8, reproductive performance is compromised.

=== Performance horses ===
Not much research has been conducted on the connection between body condition score and performance ability in horses, so optimum scores are unknown. However, horses with a low body condition score lack the fat reserves for strenuous work and also may lack lean muscle. Horses with a very high body condition score carry too much weight, which interferes with stamina and biomechanics.

Some studies addressed the relationship of body condition score and endurance performance in endurance races. In a study of the 1990 Purina Race of Champions (a 241 km/ 150-mile, 2-day endurance race), the top seven finishers of the race (i.e. highly competitive horses) had significantly lower body condition scores and marginally less rump fat than horses eliminated for metabolic criteria (i.e. less competitive horses).

By contrast, two studies on the Tevis Cup (a 160 km / 100-mile 24-hour race held each August near Truckee, California) found both for 1995 and 1996 (study 1) and for 1998 (study 2), that significantly more horses finished the race when they had a higher (vs. lower) body condition score. Horses competing in 1995 and 1996 had body condition scores ranging from 1.5 to 5.5 (1998: 2.5 to 5.5); no horses with a score of ≤ 2.5 (1998: scores ≤ 3) finished the respective race, and all horses with a score of 5.5 (same in 1998) finished the respective race. In both studies, no significant relationship was found between the horses' weights and their time to finish the course (or, if they were eliminated: the miles they completed before elimination). The studies did not find a significant effect for the influence of rider weight on the race results; for 1998, the rider weight / horse's body weight ratio was significantly higher among horses qualified for metabolic criteria than for race finishers (but no significant effect on placing of the finishers). The authors discuss for their first study the role of substrate depletion at sub-maximal exercise levels, but also the possibility that horses had a negative energy intake before the race due to their high exercise levels, possibly also leading to a decrease in muscle mass. They explain the differences of results between the studies in part in that the participating horses of the 1990 Purina Race of Champions had to qualify before and present a more highly-performing field of horses. Both Tevis Cup studies found that horses with a higher body condition score had, however, a significantly higher rate of not finishing the race due to lameness.

=== Horses on winter pasture ===
Horses on pasture should enter the winter season at a body condition score of 6 or 7. On extremely cold days, a horse cannot eat enough feed to balance the energy requirements of maintaining body heat, so condition is often lost over winter.

== Management ==
Monitoring a horse's body condition may alert a horse owner or barn manager to potential health or management issues. Body condition score can be affected by a variety of factors such as feed intake, weather, exercise, metabolic diseases such as equine metabolic syndrome, pituitary pars intermedia dysfunction, illness, tooth issues, parasitic infections, reproduction, and many others. Appropriate horse care allows a proper body condition to be maintained in the horse.
