= Choke (horse) =

Condition in horses in which the esophagus is blocked

Choke is a condition in horses in which the esophagus is blocked, usually by food material. Although the horse is still able to breathe, it is unable to swallow, and may become severely dehydrated. A secondary condition, aspiration pneumonia, may also develop if food material and saliva accumulate in the pharynx, spilling into the trachea and into the lungs. Choke is one of the "top 10" emergencies received by equine veterinarians.

The condition is seen in other Equidae like mules and donkeys.

== Causes ==
Chewing: Horses may develop choke if they do not chew their food properly. Therefore, horses with dental problems (e.g. acquired or congenital malocclusion, loose or missing teeth, or excessively sharp dental ridges) that do not allow them to completely grind their food are particularly at risk. In addition, horses that bolt their feed and do not take the time to chew properly are more likely to suffer from choke.

Dry Food: Dry foods may cause choke, especially if the horse does not have free access to water, or if the horse has other risk factors linked to choking. While pelleted or cubed feeds in general fall in this category, horse owners sometimes express particular concerns about beet pulp. However, while horses have choked on beet pulp, a university study did not document that beet pulp is a particular problem. It is believed that choke related to beet pulp is linked to the particle size and the horse's aggressive feeding behaviour, rather than the actual feed itself. Research suggests that horses that bolt their feed without sufficient chewing, or who do not have adequate access to water, are far more likely to choke, regardless of the type of feed, compared to horses that eat at a more leisurely rate. The risk of choke associated with any dry feed can be reduced by soaking the ration prior to feeding.

Foreign Objects: Horse may ingest non-edible materials such as pieces of wood. Cribbers may be more prone to this type of choke, if they happen to swallow a piece of wood or other material while cribbing.

== Signs of choke ==
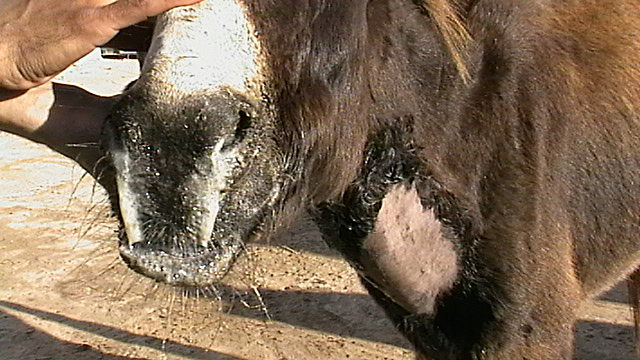
Discharge of the nostrils in a donkey with choke due to eating dry sugar beet pulps 3 days ago; note enlarged esophagus in the shaved area

- Difficulty swallowing (horse may try to swallow without success)
- Lack of interest in food
- Coughing
- Extending the neck and head, usually in a downward direction
- Discharge from the nostrils. usually green in color, although it may also be yellow or clear, often looks like vomit
- Increased salivation, saliva drooling from the mouth
- Heart rate may increase slightly, due to the distress of the animal
- Occasionally, a lump on the side of the neck is visible or can be palpated, where the esophagus is blocked. This is normally most obvious on the left.

== Diagnosing choke ==
If a horse is suspected of choke, a veterinarian will often pass a stomach tube down the animal's esophagus to determine if there is a blockage. Failure to access the stomach with the tube indicates a complete obstruction; difficulty passing the tube may represent a stenosis, or narrowing; or a partial obstruction. Radiography and endoscopy are also used in refractory cases.

== Treatment ==
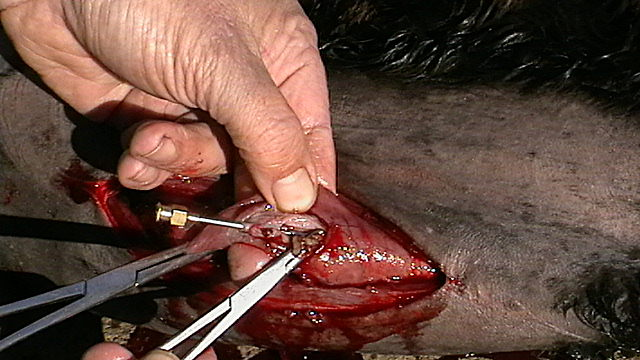
surgery of choke in a donkey: in opened esophagus, note reflux of sugar beet pulps

Choking horses should be deprived of food and drink pending veterinary attention, so as not to increase the obstructive load within the esophagus. The veterinarian will often sedate the horse and administer spasmolytics, such as butylscopolamine, to help the esophagus to relax. Once the muscles of the esophagus no longer force the food down the throat (active peristalsis), it may slip down on its own accord. If spasmolytics do not solve the problem, the veterinarian will usually pass a stomach tube through one of the nostrils and direct it into the esophagus until the material is reached, at which point gentle pressure is applied to manually push the material down. Gentle warm water lavage (water sent through the stomach tube, to soften the food material) may be required to help the obstructing matter pass more easily, but caution should be exercised to prevent further aspiration of fluid into the trachea.

Refractory cases are sometimes anesthetised, with an orotracheal tube placed to prevent further aspiration and to allow for more vigorous lavage. Disruption of the impacted material can sometimes be achieved via endoscopy. If these methods still do not lead to results, the horse may require surgery to remove the material. Some workers have advocated the use of oxytocin in choke, on the grounds that it decreases the esophageal muscular tone. However, this technique is not suitable in pregnant mares, as it may lead to abortion.

== Following up ==
After the material has passed, a veterinarian may try to prevent the onset of aspiration pneumonia by placing the horse on broad-spectrum antibiotics. The animal should be monitored for several days to ensure that it does not develop pneumonia, caused by inhalation of bacteria-rich food material into the lungs.

The material caught in a horse's throat usually causes inflammation, which may later lead to scarring. Scarring reduces the diameter of the esophagus (a stenosis or stricture), which increases the chance that the horse may choke again. The veterinarian may therefore place the horse on a course of NSAIDs, to help to control the inflammation of the esophagus.

Often the horse will only be fed softened food for a few days, allowing the esophagus to heal, before it is allowed to gradually resume its normal diet (e.g. hay and unsoaked grain). Horses with re-occurring chokes may require their diet to be changed.

== Prevention ==
- Always provide water for the horse
- Soak dry foods before feeding to horses prone to choke
- Change feeds gradually
- Discourage the bolting of food: spread out feed, place large, flat stones (large enough so that the horse can not swallow it) or salt blocks in the feed bin so that the horse must slow down, or feed smaller meals more often
- Cut apples, carrots, or other treats into small pieces
- Withhold feed material for one hour following sedation
