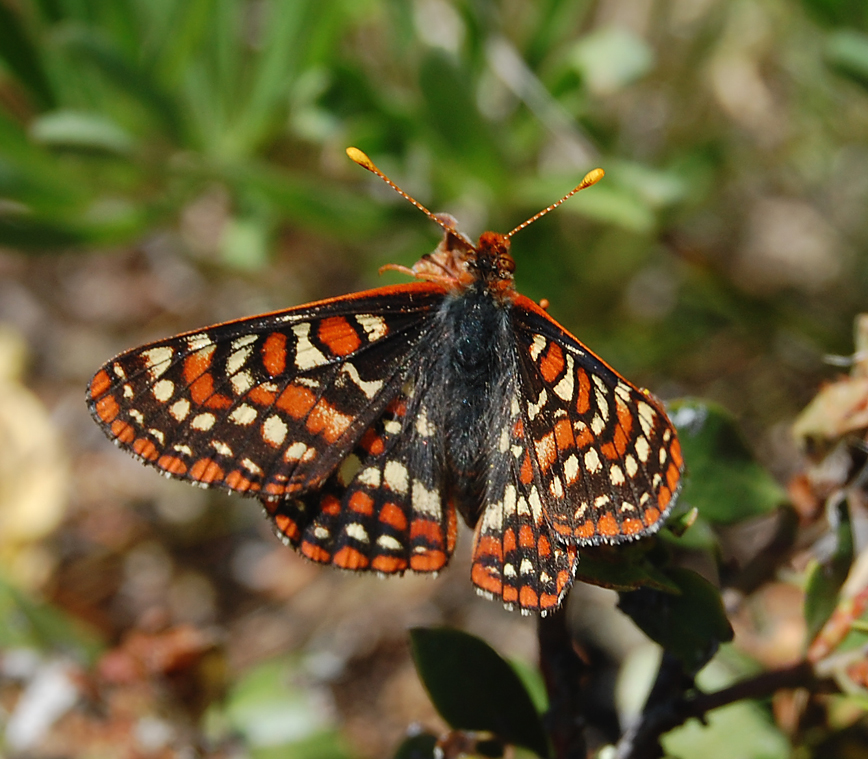

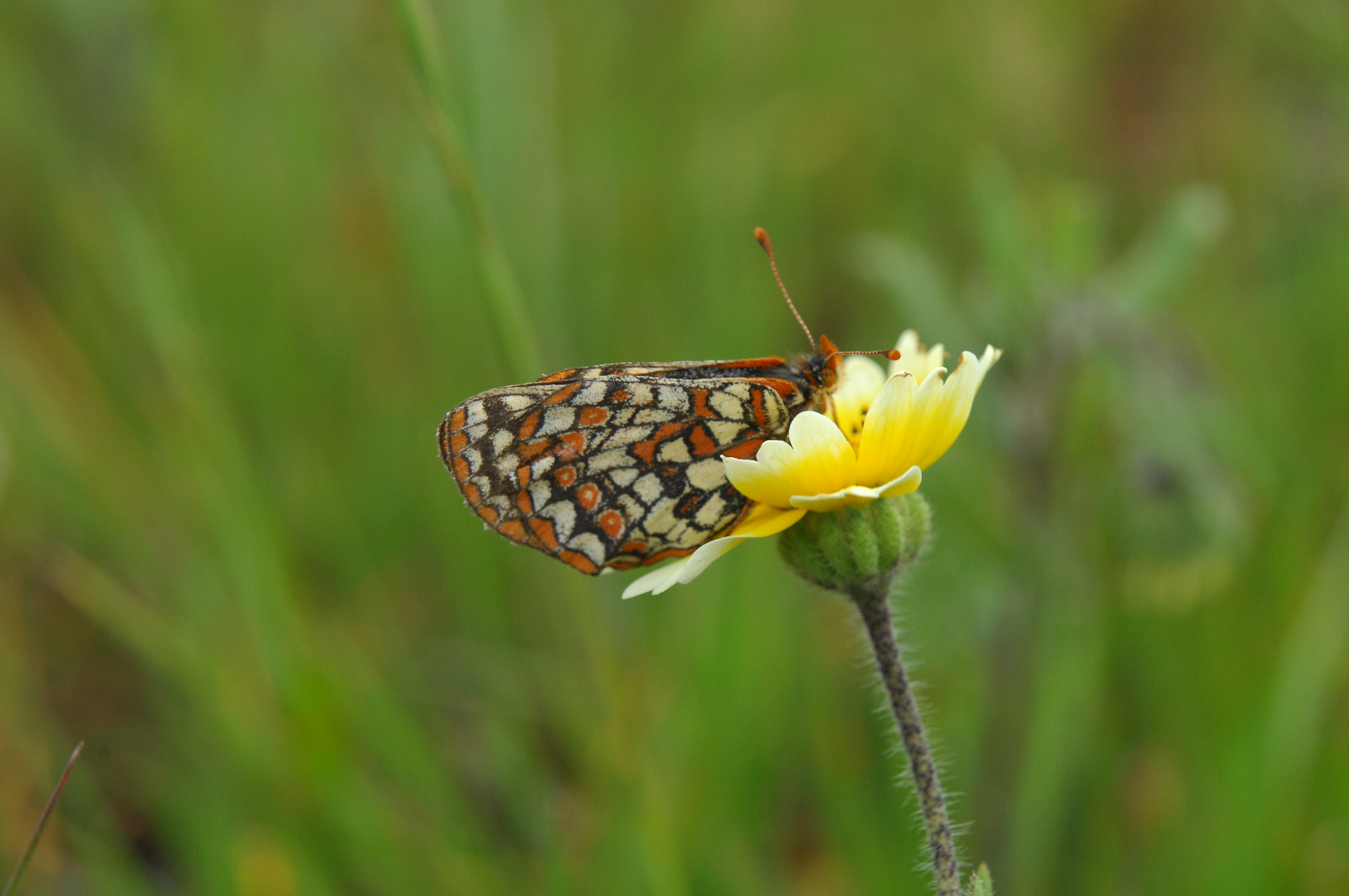

Conservation status
- Threatened (ESA)

Scientific classification
- Kingdom: Animalia
- Phylum: Arthropoda
- Clade: Pancrustacea
- Class: Insecta
- Order: Lepidoptera
- Family: Nymphalidae
- Genus: Euphydryas
- Species: E. editha
- Subspecies: E. e. bayensis

Trinomial name
- Euphydryas editha bayensis (Sternitsky, 1937)

= Bay checkerspot butterfly =

Bay checkerspot Euphydryas editha bayensis

Subspecies of butterfly

The Bay checkerspot (Euphydryas editha bayensis) is a butterfly endemic to the San Francisco Bay region of the U.S. state of California. It is a federally threatened species, as a subspecies of Euphydryas editha.

Since the 1980s the population of checkerspots, the Euphydryas species and subspecies, has been in serious decline. This particular subspecies had been the subject of extensive study by researchers at Stanford University since the 1960s. Thus its vulnerability, particularly in light of rapid land development taking place in the San Francisco Bay Area, was recognized by this group of researchers. Consequently, in 1980 they petitioned the U.S. government to list this checkerspot subspecies as endangered. This led to a prolonged and contentious review by the U.S. Fish and Wildlife Service involving scientists representing arguments for and others against listing and numerous public hearings. The service finally conferred federally threatened status designation in 1987.

Recently, two authors have advocated a reclassification for this subspecies of the checkerspot common to western North America, Euphydryas editha. The classification, to Euphydryas editha editha, is for reasons of historical precedence; however, this has not been accepted by the scientific community.

== Description ==
The Bay checkerspot butterfly is a medium-sized butterfly with a wingspan of slightly more than 2 inches (51 mm). As a member of the family Nymphalidae the checkerspot is part of a group of brush-footed butterflies. The insect's forewings are marked with black bands along the veins of the wing's upper surface. It is the black banding that gives the Bay checkerspot its unique appearance and its name. The bands contrast sharply with bright red, yellow and white spots.

The Bay checkerspot differs from other checkerspots, with characteristics differing:

- from the LuEsther's checkerspot (Euphydryas editha luestherae) by being darker, it also lacks the relatively uninterrupted red band on the outer wing which the LuEsther's checkerspot has.
- from the island checkerspot (Euphydryas editha insularis) by being not as dark and brighter red and yellow than, which lives on the Channel Islands and nearby mainland.
- from other subspecies such as the Quino checkerspot (Euphydryas editha quino) or the Mono Lake checkerspot (Euphydryas editha monoensis) by having black bands that give the Bay checkerspot a much more checkered appearance than they have.

The subspecies was first described, as Euphydryas editha var. bayensis, by Robert F. Sternitzky in 1937.

== Life cycle ==
Adult butterflies emerge in early spring. The adults, which live an average of ten days emerge during a six-week period from late February to early May. The male Bay checkerspot typically emerges four to eight days before the female. The males have one goal, reproduction. They find and mate with a female immediately upon emerging. The male mates many times while most females mate only once during the flight season. Besides mating the adults spend time foraging for nectar and for the females, laying eggs.

The eggs are usually laid in March and April. The adult female will lay up to five masses of eggs which contain 2 to 250 eggs each. The eggs are deposited at the base of the dwarf plantain plant or less frequently the purple owl's clover or denseflower Indian paintbrush. The eggs take about ten days to hatch and upon emergence from the eggs the larvae grow for a period of two weeks or more during which they shed their skin until they reach their fourth instar. Any larvae that successfully enters the fourth instar enter a period of diapause that lasts through the entire summer. During diapause they spend time under rocks or within cracks in the soil. When the diapause ends they resume activity, feeding and move to complete their development into adult Bay checkerspot butterflies.

== Diet ==
While the larvae are dependent on the host plants, mostly the dwarf plantain, for sustenance the adult butterflies live on nectar. They feed on a variety of plants associated with serpentine grasslands. Some of these plants include California goldfields, white turtlehead, desert parsley, scytheleaf onion, false babystars, intermediate fiddleneck and others. Female fecundity is dramatically affected by nectar availability.

== Habitat ==
This subspecies of butterfly faces declining habitat which has contributed to its placement onto the list of federally threatened species. Like other endangered and threatened species of butterflies, in and around the Bay Area, the checkerspot is faced with rapid human development of areas once considered prime habitat. Development and the proliferation of invasive species, exotic non-natives that naturalize in the area, are two of the three most grave threats to this and several other species of butterfly. The greatest threat to the butterfly is likely the increasing emission of nitrogen in California.

=== Range ===
The historic range of the checkerspot included many areas around the San Francisco Bay. Most of the San Francisco peninsula, mountains near San Jose, Oakland Hills and several locales around Alameda County were once home to populations of the butterfly. The butterfly occurred in areas east, west and south of the Bay, from Twin Peaks to Mount Diablo in Contra Costa County, all the way south to Hollister. Many of these areas no longer support the subspecies as development of the area increased throughout the 20th century. Today the only known populations inhabit Santa Clara County. Disturbances, specifically the altered regimes of these disturbances (i.e. lack of fire) have, along with invasive grassland plants, induced decline in the population of the host plants.

The current range is much reduced and patchy at that. Of all occurrences of the butterfly known when the subspecies was listed as threatened in 1987, all in San Mateo County have disappeared. A reintroduction of 1000 larvae to Edgewood Park in February 2007 did not result in a re-establishment of a population at this location. The subspecies was last observed at San Bruno Mountain in 1985 and at Jasper Ridge Biological Preserve in 1998. All remaining known populations of the butterfly are in Santa Clara County. The U.S. Fish and Wildlife Service recommends that any area of appropriate habitat within the historic range should be considered "potentially occupied". One site in Santa Clara County that has a large source population, that may number in the hundreds of thousands, is near the city of Morgan Hill on a ridge line currently called Coyote Ridge; much of this was acquired by the Santa Clara Valley Open Space Authority and is scheduled to open in 2018 as Coyote Ridge Open Space Preserve.

In the area of Jasper Ridge Biological Preserve local populations were deemed extinct in 1998. The populations of butterflies at Jasper Ridge had been the subject of intensive study and research at the lead of Stanford biologist Paul Ehrlich. Ehrlich had studied the Jasper Ridge populations since 1960 and researchers were able to examine 70 years of climate data and conclude that gigantic fluctuations in local climate probably hastened the demise of the Jasper Ridge Bay checkerspot populations. Ehrlich contends that prior to Spanish settlement of California the Bay checkerspots were almost certainly ubiquitous in California. It was the inadvertent import of invasive plant species in the hay that settlers fed cattle that brought unnatural competition for the native plants that sustained the Bay checkerspot.

The butterfly and its host plants thrive in areas with serpentine soil, soils derived from the serpentinite mineral, and other ultramafic rocks. The habitat has been described as consisting of three general types. Type one is the primary habitat which occurs on native grasslands located upon very large serpentine outcroppings. Type two is secondary or "satellite" habitat "islands" which occur in native grasslands on smaller serpentine outcrops. These satellites are typically generating very robust populations of Bay checkerspots in favorable weather with good habitat conditions. Type three are the tertiary habitats. These areas are where both Bay checkerspot larva and the plants they feed on occur in non serpentine soils with similarities to serpentine derived soil.

The possible reclassification of Euphydryas editha bayensis would indicate a change in range for the Bay checkerspot because of several populations of checkerspot butterflies whose subspecific status has been uncertain. If the nomenclature change was accepted it could represent a range extension for the threatened butterfly.

=== Host plants ===
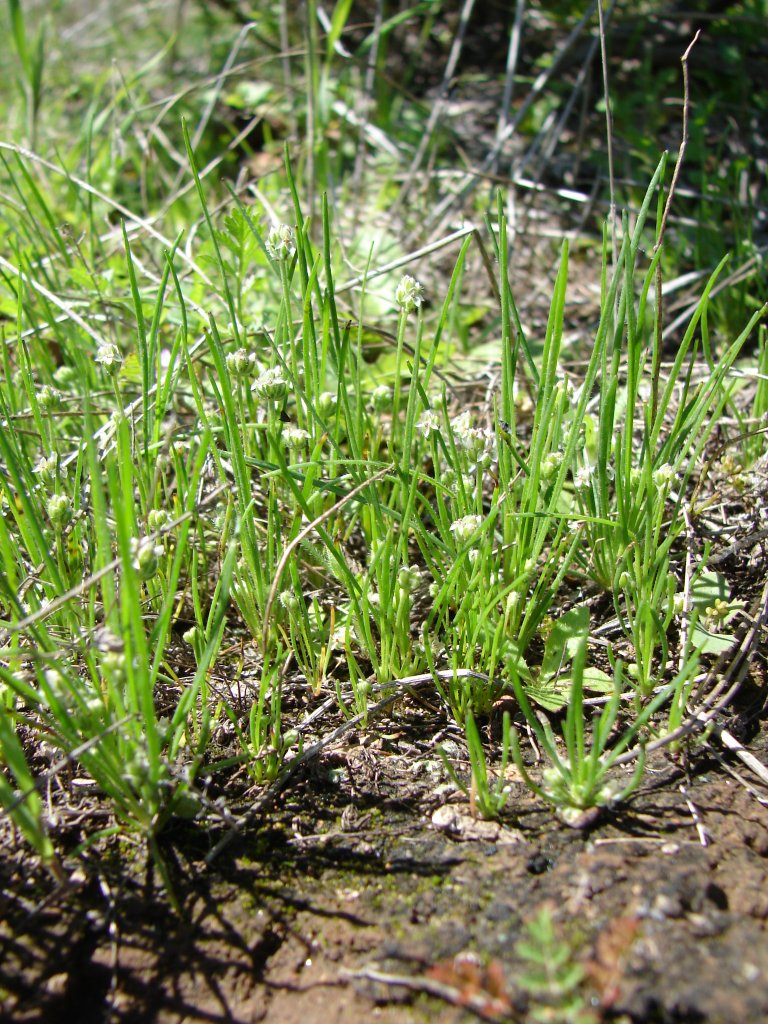
The dwarf plantain, Plantago erecta

The Bay checkerspot depends upon plants in two different genera as a larva. The primary host plant is of the genus Plantago while the secondary host plants occur in the genus Castilleja.

==== Plantago erecta ====
Plantago erecta, or dwarf plantain, is one of the primary host plants in the genus Plantago for the Bay checkerspot butterfly. In many years, the plantain dries up causing the checkerspot larvae to seek a secondary host plant. P. erecta is native to California and only found in western North America. As the primary host plant for the Bay checkerspot, it is an important species for conservation of the butterfly. P. erecta is known variously as California plantain, English plantain, foothill plantain, dotseed plantain, and dwarf plantain. It is typically found in coastal sage scrub, foothill woodland, and chaparral biomes.

==== Castilleja exserta ====
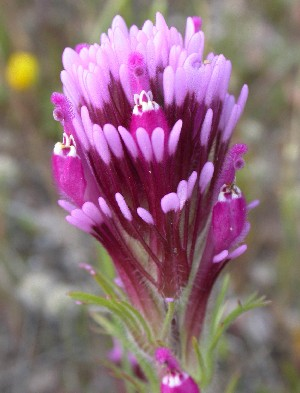
Purple owl's clover, Castilleja exserta

Castilleja exserta is known by a handful of common names: exserted Indian paintbrush, sometimes red owl's clover, or purple Indian paintbrush. It is one of two secondary larval host plants of the butterfly that remains edible later in the season and acts as a backup when the dwarf plantain dries up. The plant can grow up to 16 inches (410 mm) in height. It prefers mesas, slopes and open areas in ponderosa pine forests and poppy fields at elevations from 1,500 to 4,500 feet (1,370 m). The flowers bloom from March to May and are about 1.25 inches long (32 mm) and formed in dense spikes, they are magenta or purple on the lower corolla lips and have yellow or white tips. The bract, modified leaves, are a reddish purple and hold five to seven lobes, each about one inch long (25 mm). It ranges from middle to southern California, into southern Arizona and northern Mexico.

The plant's original classification, Orthocarpus purpurascens, has been shown, after careful study, to have been incorrect. Study showed that it belonged to the genus Castilleja.

==== Castilleja densiflora ====
C. densiflora, commonly referred to as purple owl's clover is the second of two secondary larval host plants of the butterfly. Similar to C. exersta, it often remains green later into the spring than the butterfly's primary host plant. The plant is generally between 4 and 12 inches (100 and 300 mm) in height and grows in small colonies. Flowers can be observed between April and July. Flowers are pink/purple to white/yellow with five petals with white lobes that form a yellow "beak" and "eyespots" on the lower lip, which resembles the face of an owl. The species can be found in a variety of habitats including: foothill woodland, mixed evergreen forest, northern coastal scrub, chaparral, yellow pine forest, and native grasslands.

=== Habitat conservation ===
The Bay checkerspot butterfly is the subject of a number of conservation programs, both private and public. Some of the more notable projects are headed by the U.S. Fish and Wildlife Service (USFWS) and Stanford University. On September 11, 1984, the USFWS proposed that 8,300 acres (34 km^{2}) in five sites be declared "critical habitat" for the Bay checkerspot. Areas included San Bruno Mountain, Edgewood County Park and its adjacent watershed lands, Redwood City, between the boundary with Woodside, Jasper Ridge and Coyote Ridge in the Morgan Hill zone.

The USFWS has identified several of these areas as core habitat areas, which it considers essential to the survival of the subspecies. These areas include some of those mentioned above and others. Areas along the Coyote Ridge, including Kirby, Metcalf, San Felipe, Silver Creek Hills have been designated "core habitat areas". An area of 1,100 acres (4 km^{2}) in the Santa Teresa Hills has been labeled a "potential core area" by the Wildlife Service. The service also denotes some other areas, near core populations, of good quality, meaning suitable habitat. Tulare Hill is one of those areas and, along with the Santa Teresa Hills and Redwood City, is considered a "stepping stone".

==== Nitrogen effect ====
One of the interesting dynamics of conservation of this butterfly is associated with increased nitrogen through air pollution. Increased nitrogen increases the fertility of serpentine soils, soils naturally low in nitrogen. This increased fertility allows invasive plants to thrive and exclude the nectar sources that the Bay checkerspot needs. This is where moderate grazing brings help to the threatened checkerspot. In a large metapopulation south of San Jose, removal of cattle from grasslands that the butterfly inhabited led to a significant decrease in the butterfly population because grazing leads to a net export of nitrogen as the cattle are removed for slaughter after eating the plants of the grasslands. In this way, moderate grazing enhances the butterfly's chance for survival.

Increasing nitrogen emission is a problem facing the delicate balance within the ecosystems that contain the Bay checkerspot in many areas. At Coyote Ridge the problem is well documented by conservation biologist Stuart Weiss. Faced with a declining population of Bay checkerspots at Coyote Ridge, Weiss searched for a cause. He found a link to a combination of pollution from the freeway below the ridge and, again, a cutback in cattle grazing locally. Weiss documented how nitrogen oxide emissions from cars enriched the nutrient-poor serpentine soil. This is a prime example of the nitrogen effect explained above. Aside from helping decrease nitrogen, the cattle also help to control invasive grasses by eating them. Any question about whether nitrogen emissions from cars traversing U.S. Route 101, 110,000 vehicles daily, is significant evaporates when faced with monitoring statistics from Weiss. His monitoring equipment has confirmed that 15 to 20 pounds of nitrogen per acre is deposited on Coyote Ridge annually. Some of the particles stick to the plant and ground and are washed into the soil, and others are directly absorbed by the plants themselves. By contrast, pollution from power plants and vehicles drops only about four to five pounds of nitrogen per acre per year on the Jasper Ridge preserve.

==== Jasper Ridge ====
Jasper Ridge Biological Preserve was once home to a population of the threatened checkerspot. That population became extinct in 1998. Ehrlich and his colleagues accumulated more data - probably more than is known about any other invertebrate - about the fluctuations of the Bay checkerspot populations at Jasper Ridge. Consequently, Stanford University has dispatched Ehrlich and others to conduct "longterm studies of the Bay checkerspot butterfly and feasibility of reintroduction". The professors participating, one each from biology, history, soil science and law, are examining the issues in restoring any extinct species or lost habitat. The goal of this study is to help determine whether and how to attempt a reintroduction of Bay checkerspots to Jasper Ridge.

Other goals of the Jasper Ridge study include analyzing the regulatory framework for endangered species and how changes might aid recovery of species, characterizing the genetics of research collections and possible donor populations and examining the historical changes in ownership, management and condition of the serpentine grasslands that the Bay checkerspot calls home.

==== Coyote Ridge ====
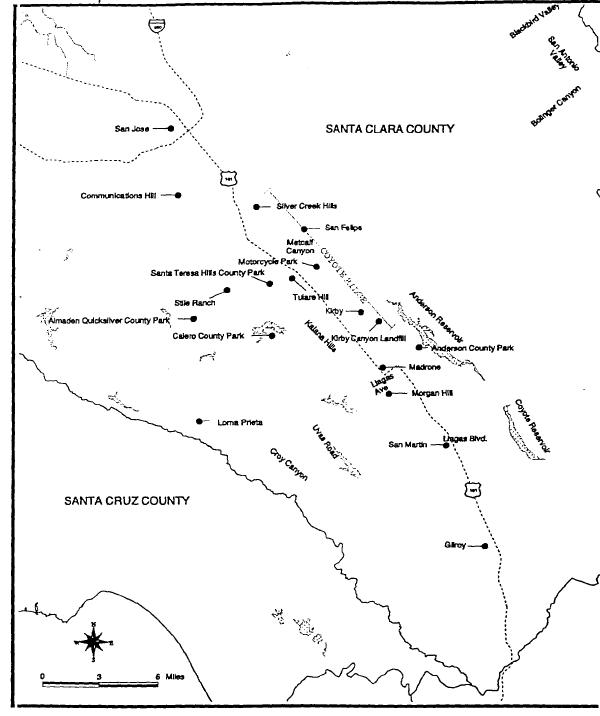
This map shows the locations of key Bay checkerspot habitats along Coyote Ridge.

The region known as Coyote Ridge refers to an unnamed ridge in Santa Clara County. A variety of names have been applied to areas along the ridge where known populations of Bay checkerspots have or do currently live. Some of these names include, Morgan Hill, Kirby Canyon, East Coyote Foothills and, of course, Coyote Ridge. The U.S. Fish and Wildlife Service identified four core areas along Coyote Ridge that require attention as Bay checkerspot habitat. They have termed them Kirby, Metcalf, San Felipe and Silver Creek Hills.

The Santa Clara Valley Open Space Authority acquired 1,831 acres (7.41 km^{2}) of this area in 2015 and the property is scheduled to open in 2018 as Coyote Ridge Open Space Preserve.

===== The Agreement =====
Right before the Bay checkerspot was federally listed the USFWS entered into an agreement with Waste Management of California, Inc. and also the city of San Jose. The agreement was made under provisions of the Endangered Species Act, specifically section 7.a.4. The agreement provided for the minimization and compensation for any take of Bay checkerspots due to any construction and operations at Kirby landfill in Kirby Canyon, along Coyote Ridge. The landfill is located adjacent to the large Kirby population of Bay checkerspots. Key aspects of the agreement include:

- limited impacts to total area, with impacts concentrated in lower quality habitat
- phased landfill use
- restoration of filled areas with appropriate vegetation
- a 15-year lease of 267 acres (1.1 km^{2}) of high-quality habitat for Bay checkerspot conservation
- restoration and management of other Bay checkerspot habitat
- monitoring of Bay checkerspot habitat and populations
- possible acquisition of Bay checkerspot habitat for further protection

Projects at Kirby Canyon were behind the original schedule in the late 1990s. Revegetation efforts were slowed in large part due to lower than expected rates landfill filling. Waste Management fulfilled the ten-year duration of the agreement and offered after to fund 50 percent of the agreement for three additional years.

===== Metcalf =====
Metcalf has been designated a "Critical Habitat" area by a 2001 USFWS rule change. The area, known in the rule as the Metcalf Unit, includes 3,351 acres (14 km^{2}) of Santa Clara County. The habitat contains the Metcalf area for Bay checkerspot which one of the four largest habitat areas and three largest current populations of Bay checkerspot. As of spring 2000 the area supported the densest population of Bay checkerspots known. With hundreds of acres of serpentine soils, thousands of Bay checkerspot butterflies occur within the unit, which is considered one of the centers of the subspecies' metapopulation in Santa Clara County. The USFWS Recovery Plan for Serpentine Soils Species put a high priority for conservation of the butterfly and its habitat. Metcalf is adjacent to Kirby to south and San Felipe to east, Silver Creek Hills is to the north and the Tulare Hill Corridor is to the west. This connectivity is crucial for Bay checkerspot dispersal throughout the Coyote Ridge area. The land in the Metcalf area is widely distributed among various parties. Portions of it lie within the city of San Jose and on private lands in unincorporated Santa Clara County. Parts of the Santa Clara County Motorcycle Park, Coyote Creek Park and the land of the Santa Clara Valley Water District fall within the Metcalf Unit.

===== San Felipe =====
Primarily on private lands, 998 acres (4 km^{2}), of land, termed the San Felipe Unit by USFWS, has been declared "Critical Habitat" for the Bay checkerspot butterfly per a 2001 rule. On the land is the San Felipe population area which is one of the four largest habitat areas and three largest current populations of Bay checkerspots. The San Felipe area is considered Santa Clara County's metapopulation of the butterfly. The Recovery Plan, from the USFWS, considered the San Felipe area to be of the highest priority for conservation. Though several hundred acres of serpentine soils occur within the unit and include nectaring and dispersal areas there are no public lands in San Felipe.

===== Silver Creek =====
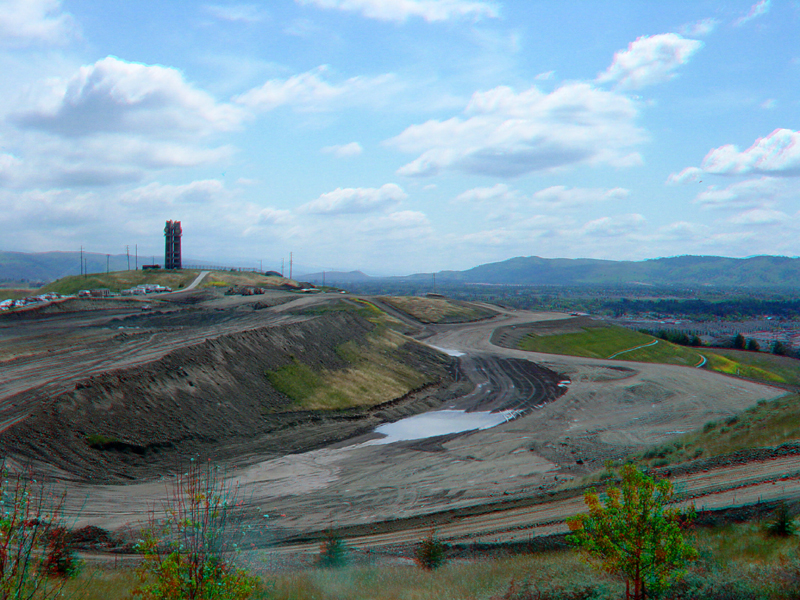
A new development in the Silver Creek area

It was a housing and golf course project that spurred the creation of the Silver Creek Butterfly Conservation Area. The homes were built, about 1,500 of them, and the golf course went in on about 1,500 acres (6 km^{2}) in the Silver Creek Valley, east of San Jose. The project resulted in the loss of about 18.5 acres (75,000 m^{2}) of serpentine habitat for the Bay checkerspot. As compensation the developer, Shea Homes, in 1991, established a permanent 115-acre (0.47 km^{2}) site for butterfly conservation in the Silver Creek Hills. The company also provided for ten years of monitoring of the preserve. Shea Homes also deposited $100,000 into an account dedicated to regional conservation of the Bay checkerspot, money now managed by USFWS.

With the Silver Creek Butterfly Conservation Area up and running the area population of Bay checkerspots increased markedly. By 1994 there were tens of thousands of adult butterflies. This population crashed in 1995 and 1996 due to problems implementing necessary management actions. By 1997 no post-diapause larvae were found and only three adults were observed during annual monitoring. Other populations are located on nearby property in the Silver Creek Hills and the nearby San Felipe habitat area.

==== Edgewood Park and Natural Preserve ====
Edgewood Park is located in San Mateo County, California, and provides a small habitat for the Bay checkerspot, one of the few remaining in the state, it is scattered and isolated like much of the remaining serpentine soil habitat areas left for the Bay checkerspot. The park is a 467 acre (1.9 km^{2}) woodland and grassland preserve located off of Interstate 280. The preserve has hiking opportunities throughout its serpentine grasslands.

The preserve was threatened by a proposed golf course development in 1983. A 1993 resolution helped secure the park's future. That year the San Mateo County Board of Supervisors closed the golf course issue when they adopted a resolution that designated Edgewood Park "a scenic natural area where outstanding features as well as significant wildlife habitats are preserved in their present state for the enjoyment, education and well-being of the public." At the same time the county also modified their agreement with Midpeninsula Open Space District, adding a clause to prohibit golf course development and emphasize natural resource preservation and low intensity recreation.

The Bay checkerspot went locally extinct during the early 2000s, last observed at Edgewood Park in 2002. This local extinction has been attributed to nitrogen deposition from cars traveling on adjacent Interstate 280, which fertilized invasive Italian ryegrass and choked out native plants required by the butterflies. However, the Italian ryegrass was intentionally planted as an erosion control measure mandated by San Mateo County Planning Department after construction of PG&E high power lines that cross the park, and spread into the park from that location. Subsequently, attempts to restore the habitat by mowing at an appropriate time of year to reduce the Italian ryegrass and allow the native plants to regrow. In early 2007, 1000 Bay checkerspot larvae were reintroduced to the park.

==== San Bruno Mountain ====
The San Bruno Mountain Habitat Conservation Plan (HCP), the first of its kind in the United States, was adopted in 1983. Currently, it is the only HCP that potentially addresses the Bay checkerspot. The plan covers some 3,400 acres (14 km^{2}) in northern San Mateo County and identifies seven animal species and 44 plant species to be conserved. Among them, the federally endangered Mission blue and the Bay checkerspot butterfly, the Bay checkerspot was not federally listed when the plan was adopted. Thus, this HCP's primary focus is on the two species of butterfly that were federally listed when it was adopted in 1983, the Mission blue butterfly and San Bruno elfin butterfly. The permit for the plan expires on March 31, 2013, and there are currently no provisions in the HCP for incidental take of Bay checkerspots. The Bay checkerspot was lost on San Bruno Mountain around 1986. The impetuses included fires, non-native plant species and natural fluctuations. The reintroduction of the Bay checkerspot is one of the goals of the San Bruno HCP.
