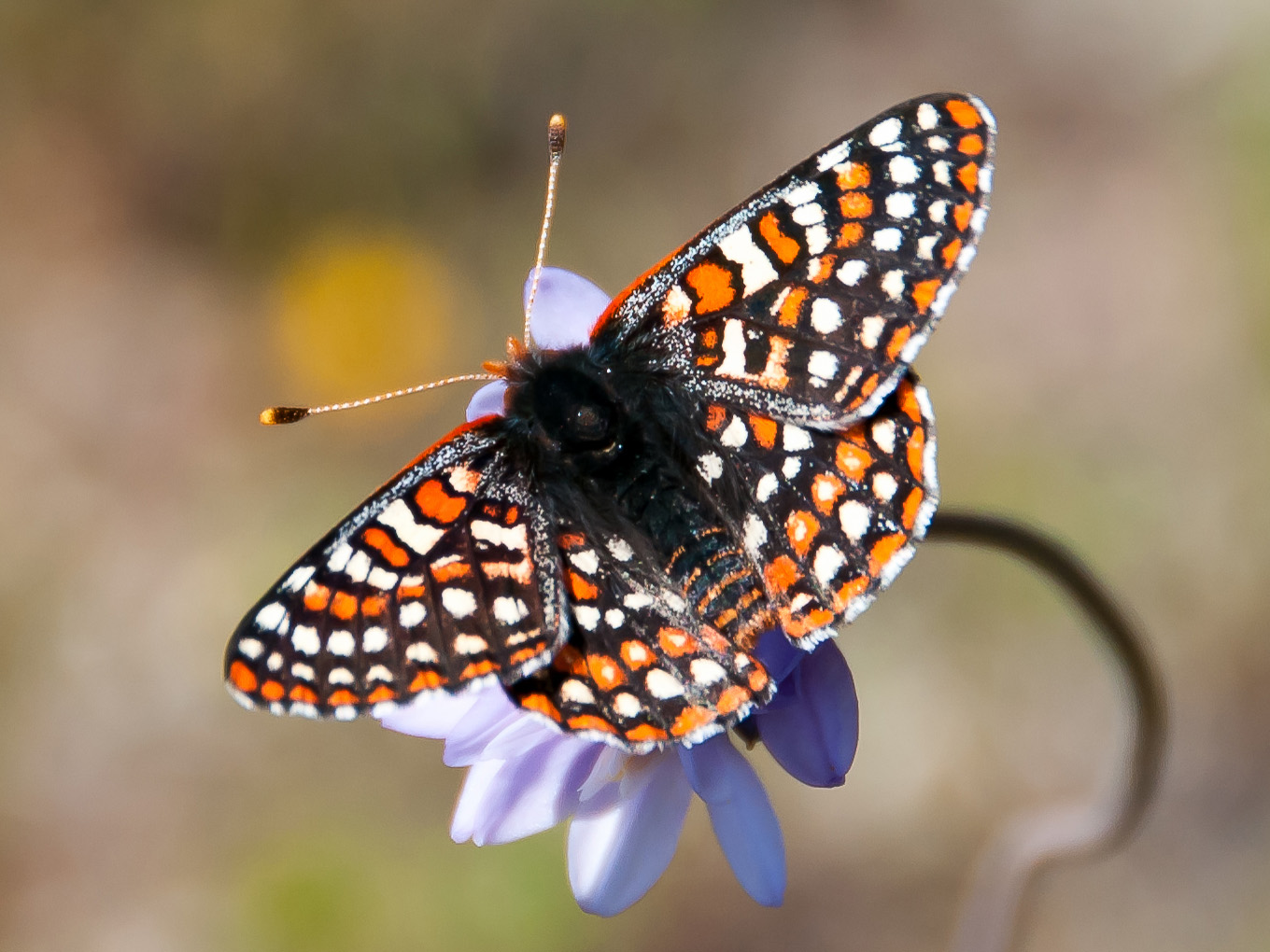

Conservation status
- Endangered (ESA)

Scientific classification
- Kingdom: Animalia
- Phylum: Arthropoda
- Class: Insecta
- Order: Lepidoptera
- Family: Nymphalidae
- Genus: Euphydryas
- Species: E. editha
- Subspecies: E. e. quino

Trinomial name
- Euphydryas editha quino Behr et al., 1863

Synonyms
- See text

= Quino checkerspot =

Species of butterfly

The Quino checkerspot (Euphydryas editha quino) is a butterfly native to southern California and northwestern Baja California. It is a subspecies of the common Edith's checkerspot (Euphydryas editha) and the second such subspecies to be listed under the federal Endangered Species Act.

== Taxonomy ==
This taxon, like many others, has undergone several changes in nomenclature and classification. It was originally described as Melitaea quino in 1863 by Hans Hermann Behr, based on specimens collected by Dr. Cooper in San Diego, and was named after Eusebio Kino, or "Padre Quino, the first European that ever succeeded in erecting a permanent settlement in California, and at the same time contributed very considerably by his learned writings to a more exact knowledge of these then scarcely discovered regions." In 1929 it was reduced to a subspecies of Euphydryas chalcedona. In 1998 it was concluded through Behr's 1863 description that it should be classified as E. editha, not E. chalcedona. Moreover, the subspecies E. editha wrighti was demoted to a junior synonym for E. editha quino.

== Description ==
=== Appearance ===
A member of the brush-footed butterfly family, Nymphalidae, the Quino checkerspot is a medium-sized butterfly with a wingspan of approximately 3 cm. The dorsal wing surfaces are a colorful checkerboard of brown, red and yellow spots. The Quino differs from other E. editha subspecies in that its spots tend to be a darker red.

It also differentiates itself through its size and larval and pupal phenotypes. The ventral side of the butterfly are dominated by a checkered red and cream pattern. Its abdomen has red stripes across the dorsal side. After a second molt, the Quino checkerspot is recognized by the dark black coloration and row of 8 to 9 orange tubercles on their back. Before the larvae first molt they are mostly yellowish. After first molt and before their second molt they are gray with black markings. The pupae are mottled black on a blue-gray background.

The Quino checkerspot is easily confused in the field by inexperienced butterfly searchers. It is generally confused with three other co-occurring butterfly species, the Chalcedon or variable checkerspot (Euphydryas chalcedona), Gabb's checkerspot (Chlosyne gabbii) and Wright's checkerspot (Thessalia leonira wrighti).

=== Life cycle ===
The life cycle of the Quino checkerspot closely mirrors that of the close Bay checkerspot. They share the same host plant and similar chronology of developmental stages. Sometimes, organisms molt seven times before reaching adulthood. There are typically only one generation of adults every year. The flight period is between February through May.

=== Host plants ===
Female butterflies only lay eggs on species they recognize as host plants. The larval food sources for the Quino checkerspot butterfly are:

- dwarf plantain (Plantago erecta)
- white snapdragon (Sairocarpus coulterianus)
- woolly plantain (Plantago patagonica)
- Chinese houses (Collinsia concolor)

Larval Quino checkerspot butterfly may also use other species of native plantain (Plantago sp.), as well as purple owl’s clover (Castilleja exserta) and thread-leaved bird's beak (Cordylanthus rigidus), as secondary host plants. The use of purple owl's clover and thread-leaved bird’s beak is rare. These species alone do not support Quino breeding.

== Habitat ==
The obvious factor in the decline of the Quino checkerspot is urban development. Much of the historic scrub land that it occupied, much like the Mission blue butterfly, also endangered, has been built over. The persisting habitat faces other threats. Invasive species, in the form of non-native plant life and overgrazing are just two of the hurdles facing the recovery of the Quino checkerspot. Today, there are eight populations of the Quino known.

=== Range ===
Habitat declined and, thus, distribution and population of the Quino checkerspot has been greatly reduced during the last 100 years, likely around 75%. Nearly all of the blame lies in agricultural and urban development in southern California. The other impactors to the decline include non-native grasses and fire suppression practices as well as grazing. The Quino checkerspot became the second subspecies of Euphydryas editha to be listed under the Endangered Species Act (ESA). The first was the Bay checkerspot.

Currently, the Quino checkerspot is only found in a very few locales: Western Riverside County, southern San Diego County along California State Route 125 and northern Baja California, Mexico. The animal's historic range once included much of coastal California south of Ventura County as well as the inland valleys south of the Tehachapi Mountains. Regardless, more than 75% of the butterfly's original range has been lost. The range loss translates directly into population decline. Quino checkerspot butterfly populations appear to have decreased by more than 95% range wide.

=== Impact of barrier construction along Mexico-United States border ===
American President Donald Trump proposed expansion of the border wall between Mexico and the US to prevent illegal entry by foreign nationals through Mexico into the US during his presidential campaign and upon being elected. The construction of additional border walls in new locations would likely have adverse effects on many species, including the Quino checkerspot. Because the range of the subspecies is so reduced and threatened already, the construction of a wall would separate the organisms in Mexico and the US, which would reduce the genetic diversity between the populations. In addition, the proposed wall could harm the native vegetation the butterflies need and may spread invasive species in areas disturbed by the construction.

== See also ==
- National Butterfly Center
