= A. falcifolium =

A. falcifolium may refer to:

- Allium falcifolium, a species of wild onion
- Angraecum falcifolium, a species of orchid in the genus Angraecum
- Asplenium falcifolium, a synonym of Asplenium simile
