= P. erecta =

P. erecta may refer to:

- Plantago erecta, a small annual herb species
- Potentilla erecta, the common tormentil, a plant species

== See also ==
- Erecta
