= S. cornutus =

S. cornutus may refer to:

- Saltuarius cornutus, a gecko species in the genus Saltuarius
- Syndesus cornutus, a beetle species in the genus Syndesus

== Synonyms ==
- Sairocarpus cornutus, a synonym for Antirrhinum cornutum, the spurred snapdragon, a New World flowering plant species

== See also ==
- Cornutus (disambiguation)
