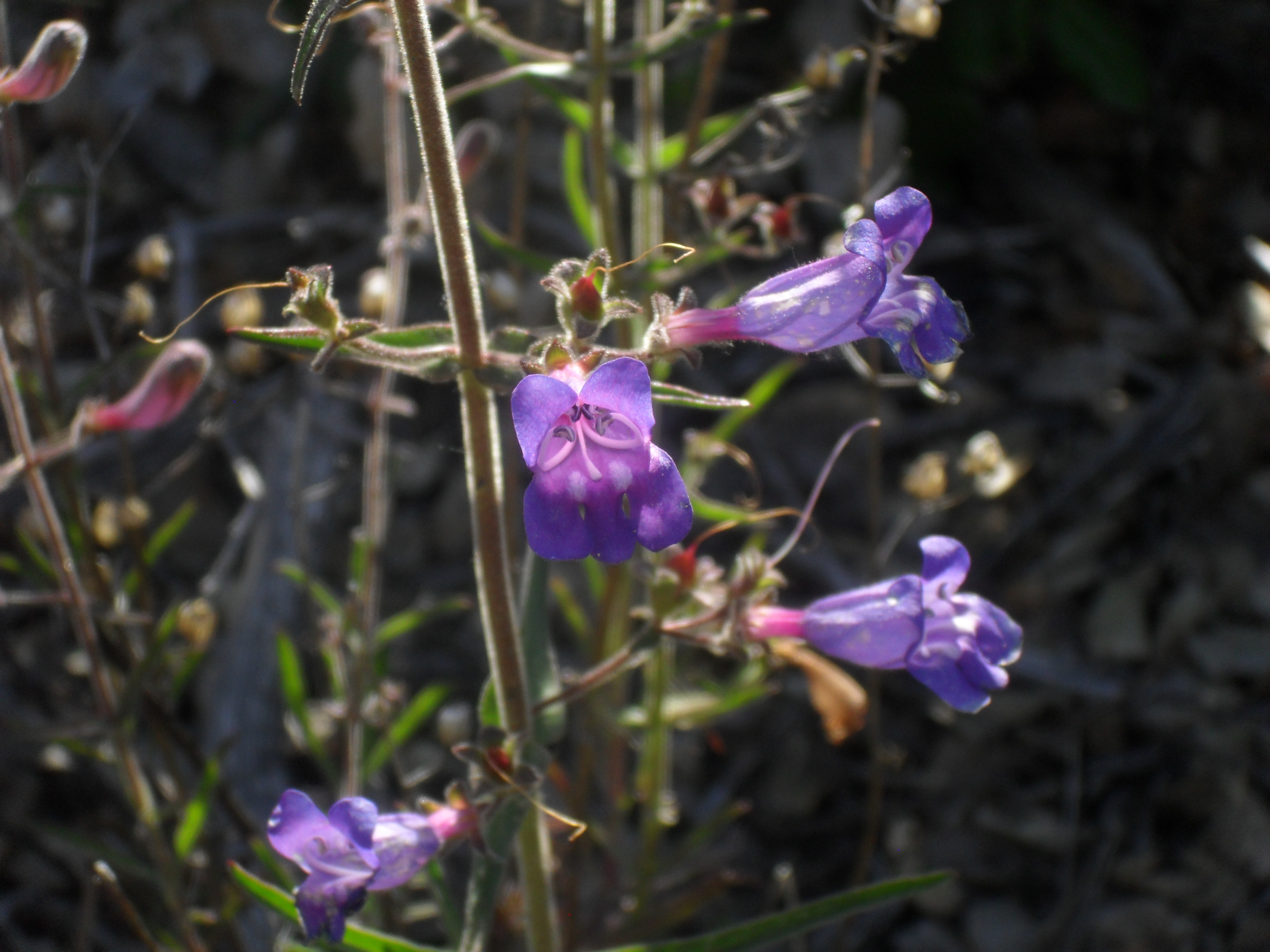
- Sairocarpus cornutus

Scientific classification
- Kingdom: Plantae
- Clade: Tracheophytes
- Clade: Angiosperms
- Clade: Eudicots
- Clade: Asterids
- Order: Lamiales
- Family: Plantaginaceae
- Tribe: Antirrhineae
- Genus: Sairocarpus; D.A.Sutton

Type species
- Sairocarpus nuttallianus (Benth.) D.A.Sutton

= Sairocarpus =

Genus of plants

Sairocarpus is a genus of the family Plantaginaceae, and is one of a group of plants commonly known as 'snapdragons'. It has ten accepted species and is being considered to include many species formerly considered as New World species of Antirrhinum.

== Species ==
Species accepted by the Plants of the World Online as of October 2022:

- Sairocarpus cornutus (Benth.) D.A.Sutton
- Sairocarpus costatus (Wiggins) D.A.Sutton
- Sairocarpus coulterianus (Benth.) D.A.Sutton
- Sairocarpus kingii (S.Watson) D.A.Sutton
- Sairocarpus multiflorus D.A.Sutton
- Sairocarpus nuttallianus (Benth.) D.A.Sutton
- Sairocarpus subcordatus (A.Gray) D.A.Sutton
- Sairocarpus vexillocalyculatus (Kellogg) D.A.Sutton
- Sairocarpus virga (A.Gray) D.A.Sutton
- Sairocarpus watsonii (Vasey & Rose) D.A.Sutton

== Bibliography ==
- Vargas P, JA Rosselló, R Oyama, J Güemes. 2004 Molecular evidence for naturalness of genera in the tribe Antirrhineae (Scrophulariaceae) and three independent evolutionary lineages from the New World and the Old. Plant Syst Evol 249:151–172.
