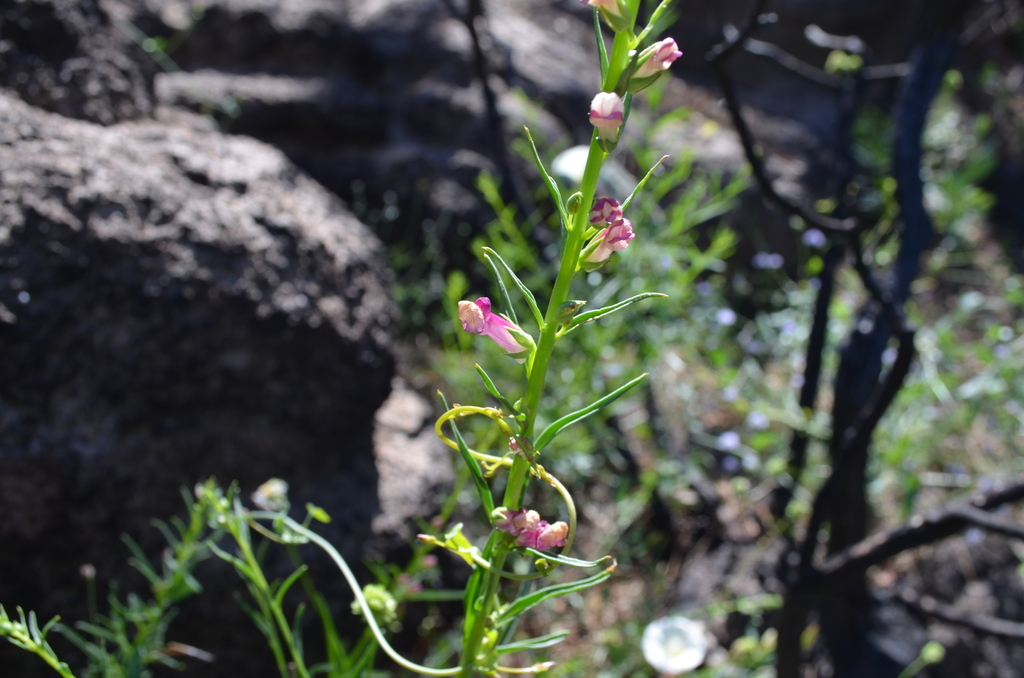

Scientific classification
- Kingdom: Plantae
- Clade: Tracheophytes
- Clade: Angiosperms
- Clade: Eudicots
- Clade: Asterids
- Order: Lamiales
- Family: Plantaginaceae
- Genus: Sairocarpus
- Species: S. virga

Binomial name
- Sairocarpus virga (A.Gray) D.A.Sutton

Synonyms
- Antirrhinum virga A.Gray

= Sairocarpus virga =

Species of flowering plant

Sairocarpus virga (syn. Antirrhinum virga) is a species of New World snapdragon known by the common name tall snapdragon.

It is endemic to the North Coast Ranges of northern California, where it grows in rocky chaparral, sometimes on serpentine soils. This is a hairless perennial herb producing erect, non-climbing stems from a woody caudex. The inflorescence is a raceme atop the stem filled loosely with pink snapdragon flowers. Each flower is between one and two centimeters long.
