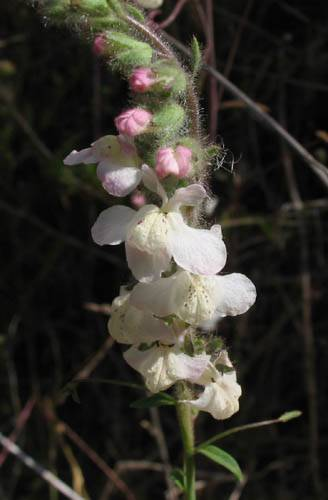

Scientific classification
- Kingdom: Plantae
- Clade: Tracheophytes
- Clade: Angiosperms
- Clade: Eudicots
- Clade: Asterids
- Order: Lamiales
- Family: Plantaginaceae
- Genus: Sairocarpus
- Species: S. coulterianus

Binomial name
- Sairocarpus coulterianus (Benth.) D.A.Sutton

Synonyms
- Antirrhinum coulterianum Benth.; Antirrhinum coulterianum var. nevinianum (A.Gray) Jeps.; Antirrhinum coulterianum subsp. orcuttianum (A.Gray) Pennell; Antirrhinum coulterianum f. orcuttianum (A.Gray) Munz; Antirrhinum nevinianum A.Gray; Antirrhinum orcuttianum A.Gray

= Sairocarpus coulterianus =

Species of flowering plant

Sairocarpus coulterianus (syn. Antirrhinum coulterianum) is a species of New World snapdragon known by the common name Coulter's snapdragon. Anterrhinum coulterianum is a host species for the Edith's checkerspot butterfly.

== Distribution ==
It is native to southern California and Baja California, where it grows in desert shrublands and in the coastal hills and mountains, especially in areas that have recently burned.

== Description ==
Sairocarpus coulterianus is an annual herb producing an erect stem which often clings to objects or other plants for support. It is mostly hairless, except for the inflorescence at the top, which can be quite woolly.

Leaves are sparse and generally linear and there is often a basal rosette of leaves at the base of the stem.

The top of the mostly naked stem is occupied by a raceme inflorescence of white snapdragon flowers, which are often tinted with lavender or pink, especially when newly opened. Each flower is about a centimeter wide.
