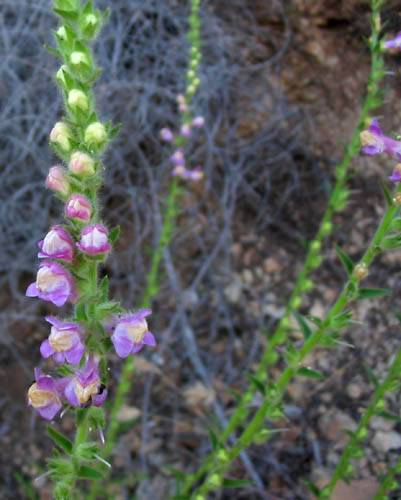

Scientific classification
- Kingdom: Plantae
- Clade: Tracheophytes
- Clade: Angiosperms
- Clade: Eudicots
- Clade: Asterids
- Order: Lamiales
- Family: Plantaginaceae
- Genus: Sairocarpus
- Species: S. multiflorus

Binomial name
- Sairocarpus multiflorus D.A.Sutton

Synonyms
- Antirrhinum multiflorum Pennell, nom. illeg.; Antirrhinum glandulosum Lindl., nom. illeg.; Antirrhinum thompsonii D.J.Keil

= Sairocarpus multiflorus =

Species of flowering plant

Sairocarpus multiflorus (syn. Antirrhinum multiflorum) is a species of New World snapdragon known by the common name Sierra snapdragon or multi-flowered snapdragon.

It is endemic to California, where it is known from the central Coast Ranges, the Transverse Ranges, and one section of the Sierra Nevada foothills. It grows on lower-elevation mountain slopes and springs up in disturbed and recently burned areas. This is an annual or perennial herb producing a hairy, erect stem which often has a woody base. It does not cling or climb like some other snapdragon species. Small, pointed leaves are arranged alternately about the tall stem. The raceme inflorescence occupies the top of the stem with many pink or red snapdragon flowers between one and two centimeters long each.
