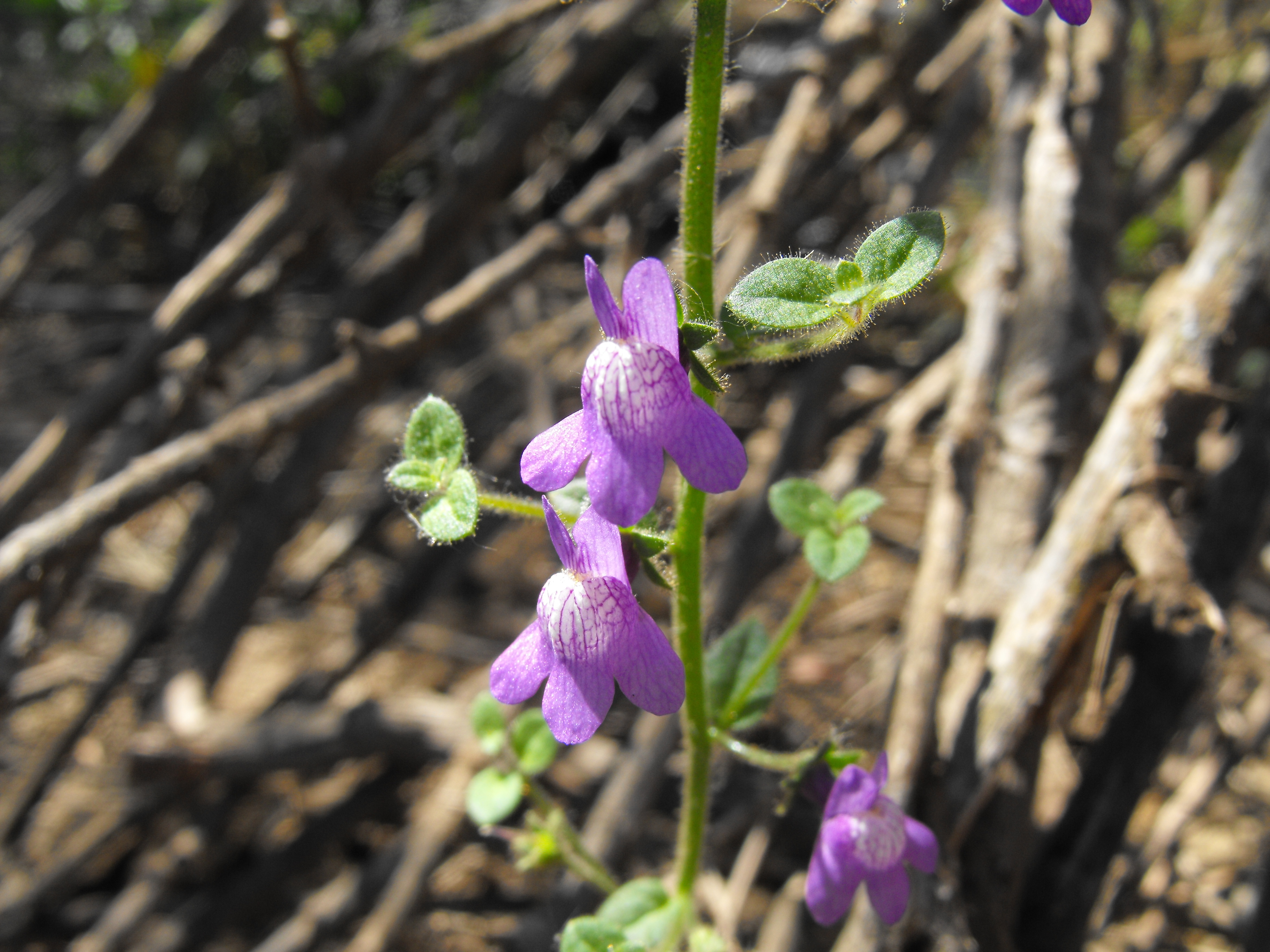

Conservation status
- Apparently Secure (NatureServe)

Scientific classification
- Kingdom: Plantae
- Clade: Tracheophytes
- Clade: Angiosperms
- Clade: Eudicots
- Clade: Asterids
- Order: Lamiales
- Family: Plantaginaceae
- Genus: Sairocarpus
- Species: S. nuttallianus

Binomial name
- Sairocarpus nuttallianus (Benth.) D.A.Sutton

Synonyms
- Antirrhinum nuttallianum Benth.; Antirrhinum pusillum Brandegee; Antirrhinum subsessile A.Gray; Sairocarpus pusillus (Brandegee) D.A.Sutton

= Sairocarpus nuttallianus =

Species of flowering plant

Sairocarpus nuttallianus, commonly known as Nuttall's snapdragon or violet snapdragon, is a species of New World snapdragon.

It is native to southern California and Baja California, where it can be found from the immediate coastline to the inland coastal ranges.

== Description ==
Sairocarpus nuttallianus is an annual or biennial herb producing an erect, vinelike stem which sometimes clings to objects for support, but does not twine as tightly as many other snapdragons. Stems, leaves, and floral calyx are all glandular hairy.

The flowers are veined light purple with white patches and around a centimeter long. Each is borne on a short pedicel.

== See also ==
- California chaparral and woodlands
- Flora of the California chaparral and woodlands
