= Máyyan 'Ooyákma – Coyote Ridge Open Space Preserve =

Park in California, U.S.

- IUCN category V (protected landscape/seascape)
- March wildflowers in Coyote Ridge Open Space Preserve

- Location within California Location within the United States
- Location: Santa Clara County, California
- Nearest city: San Jose, CA
- Coordinates: 37.214°N 121.71°W
- Area: 1,859 acres (7.52 km^{2})
- Established: 2015
- Operator: Santa Clara Valley Open Space Authority

Máyyan 'Ooyákma – Coyote Ridge Open Space Preserve is an 1,859-acre (741 ha) publicly owned open space preserve in southern Santa Clara County. It opened to the public in August 2023 with 5 miles of trails. There are 3.9 miles of trail designated as a portion of Bay Area Ridge Trail, a regional trail system that is planned to run 550 miles along the ridge lines that encircle San Francisco Bay.

Máyyan ‘Ooyákma (pronounced My-yahn Oiy-yahkmah) directly translates to Coyote Ridge in the Ohlone Chochenyo language. Chochenyo is the language stewarded by the Muwekma Ohlone Tribe of the San Francisco Bay Area, whose members trace their ancestry to the Indigenous peoples of this region. The Open Space Authority is partnering with the Muwekma Ohlone to raise awareness about the importance of the protection of irreplaceable landscapes.

== Environment ==
Because of its rare serpentine soil, this grassland area is a critical habitat for the Bay checkerspot butterfly, the California tiger salamander, and the California red-legged frog, all of which are endangered. It also supports a wide variety of California native and endemic plants. Máyyan ‘Ooyákma – Coyote Ridge Open Space Preserve connects over 1 million acres of important habitat in the Santa Cruz Mountains and the Diablo Range. Comprising rare, sensitive serpentine grasslands, this unique landscape is a biodiversity hotspot for endangered plants and animals. Scientific research on the plant and animal communities found here continues today.

== Acquisition ==
In 2015, the Santa Clara Valley Open Space Authority acquired 1,831 acres (741 ha) in the area previously referred to by various names, including Coyote Ridge. On 27 October 2022 its name was modified to "Máyyan 'Ooyákma – Coyote Ridge Open Space Preserve" to include the Chochenyo translation of "coyote ridge" as well as the English.

A variety of public and private sources made the acquisition possible after United Technologies Corporation (UTC) agreed to donate the property to the Open Space Authority. UTC receives a tax credit through the California Natural Heritage Preservation State Tax Credit Program. Under this program, the Open Space Authority must reimburse the state.

The Authority received funding for the acquisition from a broad public and private partnership that included a $2.7 million grant from the Wildlife Conservation Board, $2 million from the U.S. Fish and Wildlife Service Section 6 land acquisition program to further Habitat Conservation Plans under the Endangered Species Act, $1 million from the Gordon and Betty Moore Foundation, $1 million from the State Coastal Conservancy, $1 million from the Bureau of Reclamation Central Valley Project, $400,000 from the State Parks Recreational Trails Program, and a contributor who prefers to remain anonymous. The Open Space Authority contributed $7,500 toward the $8.6 million total, which is approximately 55% of the property’s fair market value of $15.6 million
