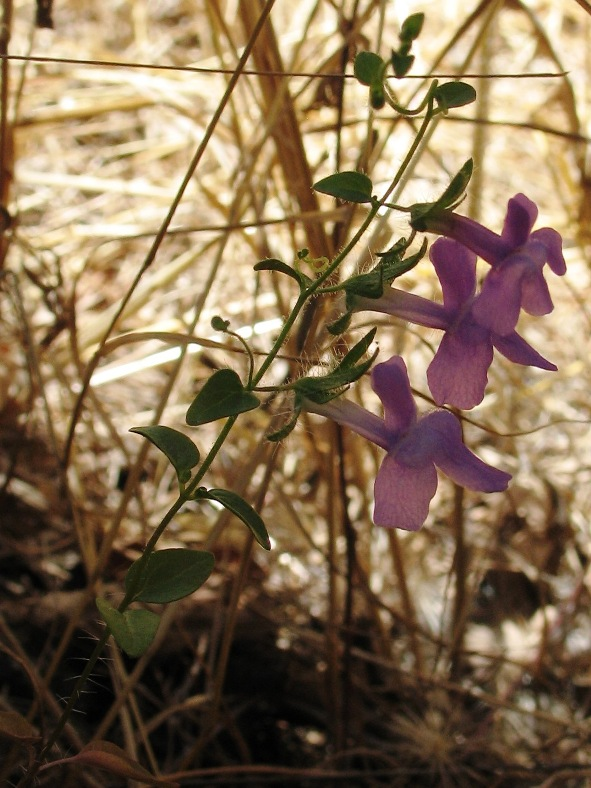
- subsp. vexillocalyculatus

Scientific classification
- Kingdom: Plantae
- Clade: Tracheophytes
- Clade: Angiosperms
- Clade: Eudicots
- Clade: Asterids
- Order: Lamiales
- Family: Plantaginaceae
- Genus: Sairocarpus
- Species: S. vexillocalyculatus

Binomial name
- Sairocarpus vexillocalyculatus (Kellogg) D.A.Sutton

Synonyms
- Antirrhinum breweri Antirrhinum vexillocalyculatum

= Sairocarpus vexillocalyculatus =

Species of flowering plant

Sairocarpus vexillocalyculatus (syn. Antirrhinum vexillocalyculatum) is a species of New World snapdragon found only in California and occasionally Oregon. This wildflower is known by several common names, including wiry snapdragon, sailflower snapdragon, and Brewer's snapdragon.

The plant twines along other plants or objects with its branchlets. It produces lavender snapdragon flowers 1 to 2 centimeters wide. The flower has a prominent lower lip and it may be streaked with darker purple. This species is most abundant in the low-elevation mountains of northern and central California, where it grows in rocky areas and especially in serpentine soil.
