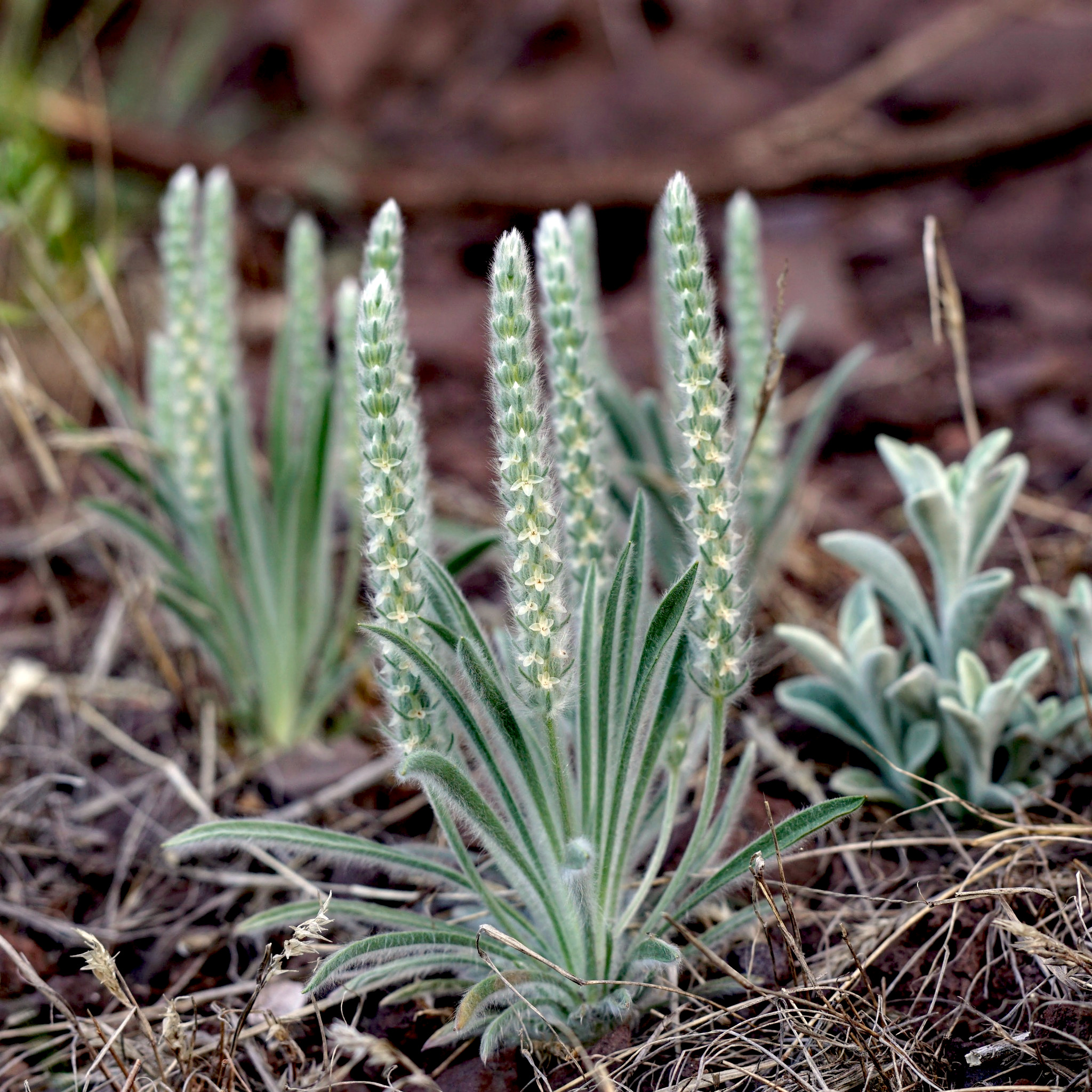
- Blooming near Silver City, New Mexico

Conservation status
- Secure (NatureServe)

Scientific classification
- Kingdom: Plantae
- Clade: Tracheophytes
- Clade: Angiosperms
- Clade: Eudicots
- Clade: Asterids
- Order: Lamiales
- Family: Plantaginaceae
- Genus: Plantago
- Species: P. patagonica

Binomial name
- Plantago patagonica Jacq.

= Plantago patagonica =

Plant species in the veronica family

Plantago patagonica is a species of plantain known by the common name woolly plantain. It is native to much of North America and to Argentina in South America. It grows in many types of habitat, including grassland, desert and woodlands. It is a hairy annual herb producing narrow leaves usually not exceeding 15 centimeters (6 in). There are usually many stemlike inflorescences growing straight upwards to a maximum height of around 15 cm (6 in).

== Description ==
Woolly plantain is a small plant with a thin taproot and usually covered in woolly hairs. It can be an annual, a winter annual, a biennial, and might rarely grow as a short-lived perennial. They can have simple crown or a caudex with as many as four branches, each producing a rosette of narrow leaves. It can have a very short true stem up to 4 centimeters (1.6 in) long, but can also lack one.

Almost all the leaves are basal, with the winter rosette leaves just 0.3 to 3 cm long. The later, principal leaves are linear-oblanceolate, a narrow and almost grass-like reversed spear head. Each typically measuring 2 to 15 centimeters (1–6 in) long, though rarely reaching 20 cm (8 in). They are just 0.5–7 millimeters wide, though sometimes as much as 15 mm. Leaf tips are sharply pointed to long and drawn out and the leaf may have one to three noticeable veins.

When flowering each plant grows 1 to 20 inflorescences that are spikes, the flowers being attached directly to the main stem rather than by a peduncle. Each spike is atop a scape, a leafless flower stem, 4 to 24 centimeters (1.6–9.4 in) tall, but occasionally just 1 cm or as much as 26 cm. The spikes are densely packed with tiny flowers and 1 to 15 cm (0.5–6 in) long, though typically 5 to 10 cm (2–4 in). The total height of the plant does not often surpass 15 cm (6 in) in total height.

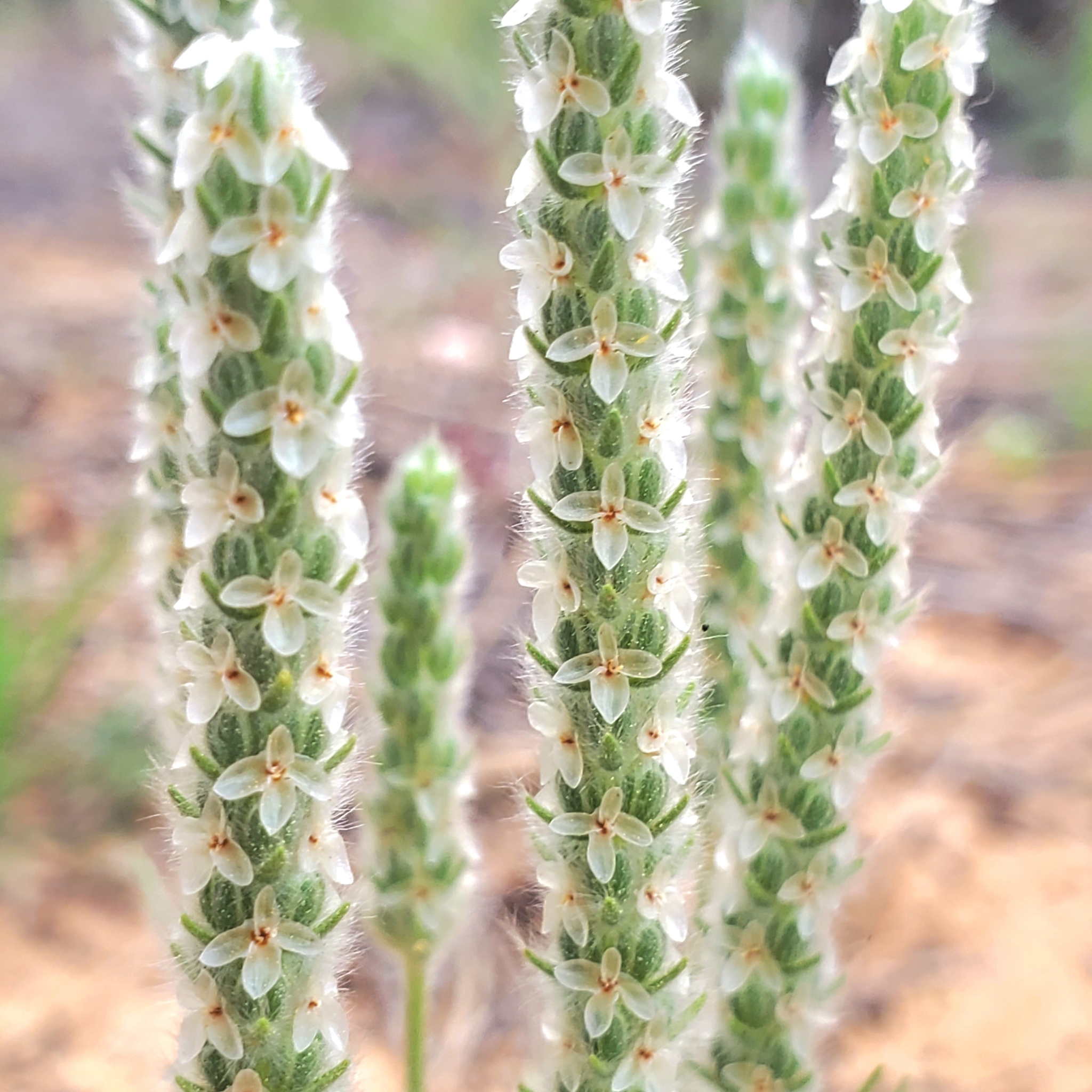
Flowers on spikes

Though the flowers are not conventionally attractive the very woolly spike is considered pleasant looking by some botanical writers. The four petals of the flowers are translucent white with a paper-like texture, just 1–2 millimeters long. Each flower has four stamens that are contained within the flower or protruding slightly.

== Taxonomy ==
Plantago patagonica was given its scientific name by Nikolaus Joseph von Jacquin in 1795. It is classified in the genus Plantago as part of the Plantaginaceae family. It has no accepted varieties but has many among its 30 botanical synonyms along with 11 species names.

Table of Synonyms
Name	Year	Notes
Plantago candicans Decne.	1852	nom. illeg.
Plantago canescens Schrad. ex Decne.	1852	not validly publ.
Plantago gnaphalioides Nutt.	1818	
Plantago ignota E.Morris	1901	
Plantago limarensis F.Phil. ex Phil.	1895	
Plantago oblonga E.Morris	1901	
Plantago picta E.Morris	1901	nom. illeg.
Plantago purshii Roem. & Schult.	1818	
Plantago spinulosa Decne.	1852	
Plantago wyomingensis Gand.	1919	
Plantago xerodea E.Morris	1909	

=== Names ===
The species name, patagonica, is Botanical Latin meaning 'from Patagonia'. The species was given this name because the first specimens collected were from the Patagonia region of what is now Argentina. It is usually called woolly plantain, but is also known as Patagonia plantain.

== Range and habitat ==
In the northern hemisphere woolly plantain is native to western Canada, most of the contiguous United States, and northern Mexico. In South America it is native to much of Argentina. It is not found in the tropical areas of the Americas between these two highly disjunct populations. It has been found in Kentucky, but is not thought to be native to the state and has also been found growing in both Germany and Italy.

In Canada it grows in the four western provinces of Manitoba, Saskatchewan, Alberta, and British Columbia. In US it is native to all the contiguous states except for Alabama, Mississippi, Florida, Kentucky, Maryland, Delaware, Pennsylvania, and Connecticut. In Mexico it is found in the northern states of Baja California, Sonora, Chihuahua, Coahuila, and Nuevo León.

== Ecology ==
Woolly plantain is a host species for the Edith's checkerspot butterfly.
