= LuEsther Mertz =

American philanthropist (1905–1991)

LuEsther Turner Mertz (December 30, 1905, in Cincinnati, Ohio – February 5, 1991, in Port Washington, New York) was a businesswoman and philanthropist. She was the youngest child of a Methodist minister and his wife and trained as a librarian at Syracuse University.

In 1953, LuEsther and her husband, Harold Mertz, along with their daughter, Joyce, founded Publishers Clearing House. Over the years, Publishers Clearing House grew from an initial mailing of 10,000 letters to a marketing legend. Mrs. Mertz was active in the company's management, serving as a member of its executive committee until her death in 1991.

In 1962 she founded Choice Magazine Listening, an audio anthology of magazine writing for the visually impaired. She believed that visually impaired people and those with disabilities that prevented them from reading standard print should have access to the same magazine writing as sighted people. She established the nonprofit Lucerna Fund to support the efforts of Choice Magazine Listening. She went on to become a major supporter of Lincoln Center, Central Park Conservancy, New York City Ballet, New York Shakespeare Festival, Joyce Theater Foundation, New York Botanical Garden, the Center for Conservation Biology at Stanford University, Joseph Papp's Public Theater, and the American Civil Liberties Union.

In her own town she served as a trustee of the Port Washington Public Library and was a founding member of the Port Washington League of Women Voters. LuEsther Mertz was awarded the Mayor's Award for Arts and Culture in 1983 and the New York State Governor's Arts Award in 1986. In 1980, Dennis Murphy and Paul Ehrlich of the Center for Conservation Biology named a subspecies of the Edith's checkerspot butterfly, Euphydryas editha luestherae, in her honor.

Since her death in 1991, aged 85, the LuEsther T. Mertz Charitable Trust has contributed to core programs at the New York Botanical Garden in horticulture, science, and visitor services, as well as to the construction of the Garden Cafe and Terrace Room, an important visitor amenity that opened in 1997. The LuEsther T. Mertz Library is named after her. The trust also donates annually to 13 other named beneficiaries.
