= Camille Parmesan =

American ecologist

Professor Camille Parmesan
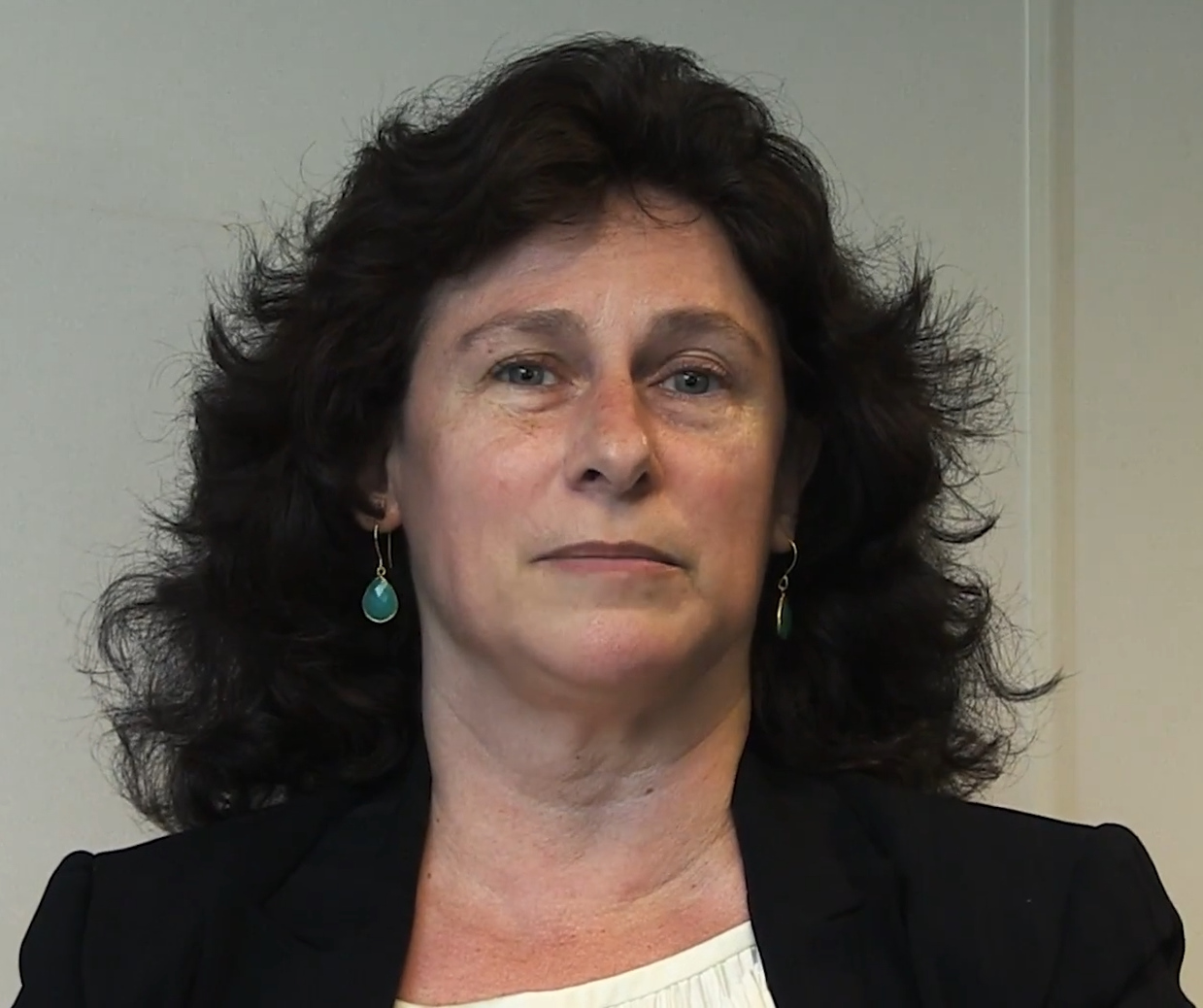
- Camille Parmesan in 2017
- Education: The University of Texas at Austin
- Scientific career
- Workplaces: The University of Texas at Austin; The University of Plymouth Centre National de la Recherche Scientifique

Camille Parmesan is an ecologist and an expert in the effects of global climate change on biodiversity. She is the National Aquarium Chair in the Public Understanding of Oceans and Human Health at The University of Plymouth U.K., at SETE-Theoretical and Experimental Ecology Station, CNRS Centre National de la Recherche Scientifique, France and is adjunct professor at The University of Texas at Austin U.S.A..

== Education and career ==
Parmesan graduated with a PhD in biological science at the University of Texas at Austin in 1995 and then worked as a postdoctoral researcher at the National Center for Ecological Analysis and Synthesis (NCEAS), University of California at Santa Barbara. She moved to her position at Plymouth in 2010 and in 2017 was one of 18 scientists who moved to France on the invitation of Emmanuel Macron.

== Research ==
Her research looks at the responses of biodiversity to global climate change. In the 1990s she published one of the first studies documenting a biological range shift due to climate change, her work on the Edith's checkerspot butterfly has been described as starting a 'revolution in science'. This study in 1996 prompted her to explore the same range shifts in other species and taxonomic groups for most of the following two decades.

Her 2003 Nature paper 'A globally coherent fingerprint of climate change impacts across natural systems' with Gary Yohe was the highest cited paper relating to climate change, with over 3,000 citations in 2015, 6,000 in 2020, and 14,000 in 2025.

== Honours and awards ==
In 2007 Parmesan was awarded the National Wildlife Federation’s Conservation Achievement Award in Science

In 2013, she was named a Distinguished Scientist by the Texas Academy of Sciences Later that year, she was given a Fellowship of the Ecological Society of America in 2013.

In 2015 she was awarded the Marsh Award for Climate Change Research by the Marsh Christian Trust and the British Ecological Society.

In 2024 she received the BBVA Foundation Frontiers of Knowledge Award in the category of "Climate Change".
