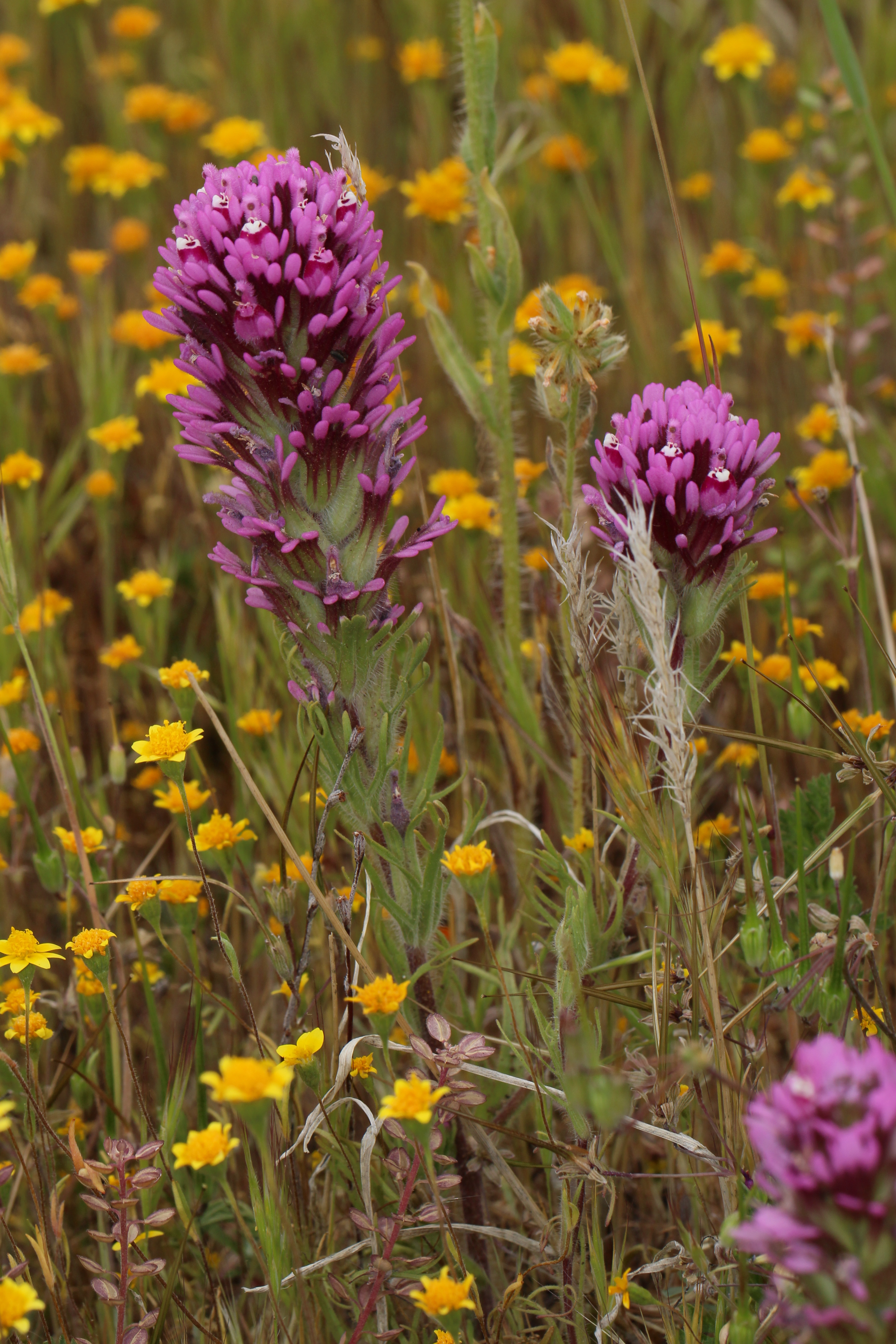

Conservation status
- Apparently Secure (NatureServe)

Scientific classification
- Kingdom: Plantae
- Clade: Tracheophytes
- Clade: Angiosperms
- Clade: Eudicots
- Clade: Asterids
- Order: Lamiales
- Family: Orobanchaceae
- Genus: Castilleja
- Species: C. exserta

Binomial name
- Castilleja exserta (Heller) Chuang & Heckard

= Castilleja exserta =

Species of flowering plant

Castilleja exserta (formerly Orthocarpus purpurascens) is a species of plant in the genus Castilleja which includes the Indian paintbrushes. Its common names include purple owl's clover, escobita, and exserted Indian paintbrush.

This species is native to the Southwestern United States in various habitats of California, Arizona, and New Mexico; and to Northwestern Mexico. It is an introduced species in Hawaii.

== Description ==
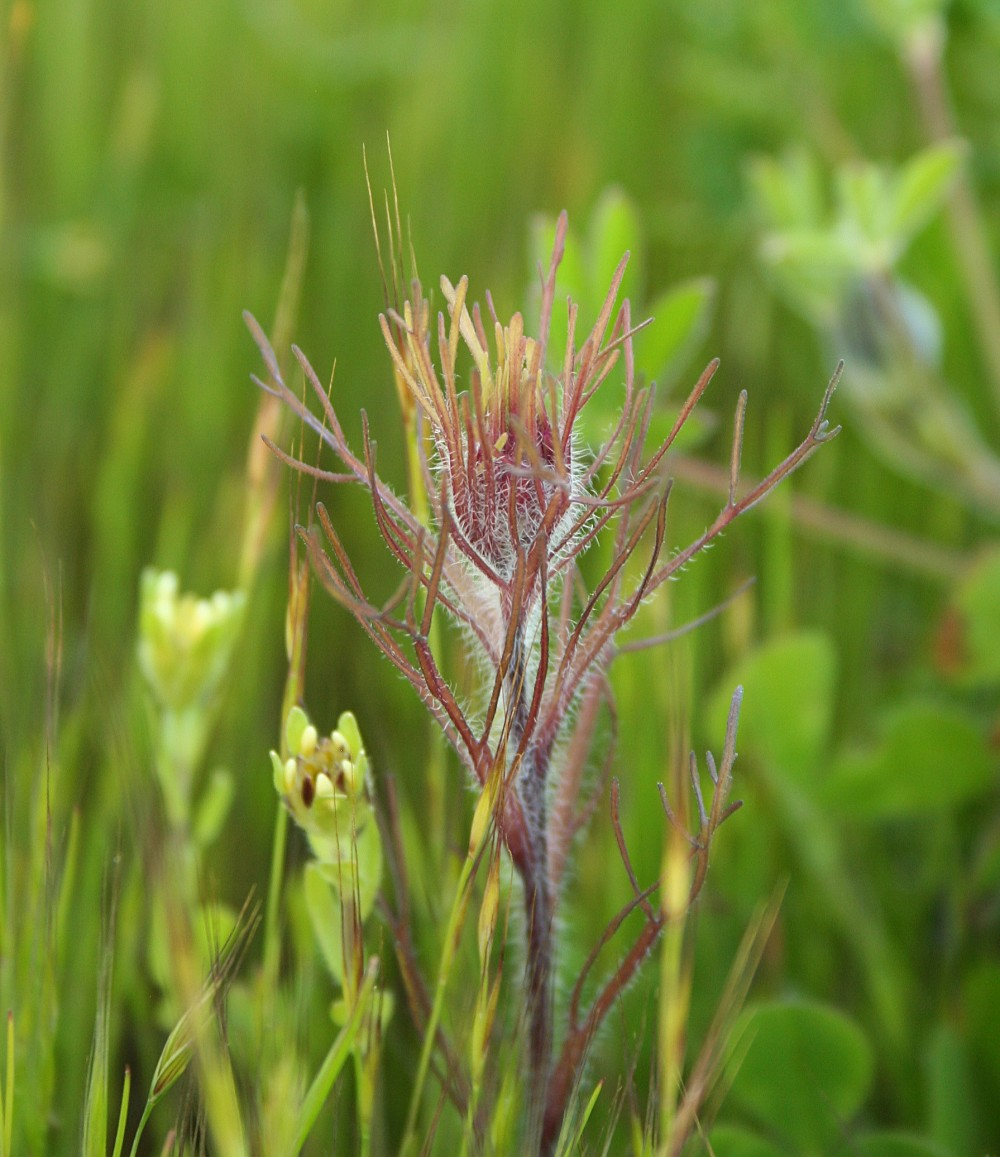
Foliage and stem, before flowering.

Castilleja exserta is an annual herb about 100–450 millimetres (4–18 in) tall with a hairy stem covered in thready leaves. Like other related Castilleja plants, this species is a hemiparasite, deriving some of its nutrients directly from the roots of other plants by infiltrating them with haustoria. As a result, its own leaves are small and reduced.

Although this species is variable in appearance and easily hybridizes with other Castilleja species, it generally bears a brightly colored inflorescence of shaggy pink-purple or lavender flowers. The thin, erect bracts are usually tipped with the same color, giving the inflorescence the appearance of a paintbrush.

=== Varieties ===
Varieties include:

- Castilleja exserta var. exserta — pale purple owlclover.
- Castilleja exserta var. latifolia — wideleaf Indian paintbrush; endemic to coastal California.
- Castilleja exserta var. venusta — endemic to California: Mojave Desert, southern San Joaquin Valley.

== Bay checkerspot butterfly host ==
This is a crucial host plant for the Bay checkerspot butterfly (Euphydryas editha bayensis), which is a threatened species that is endemic to the San Francisco Bay region in California.

The seeds were harvested by indigenous peoples of California for food.

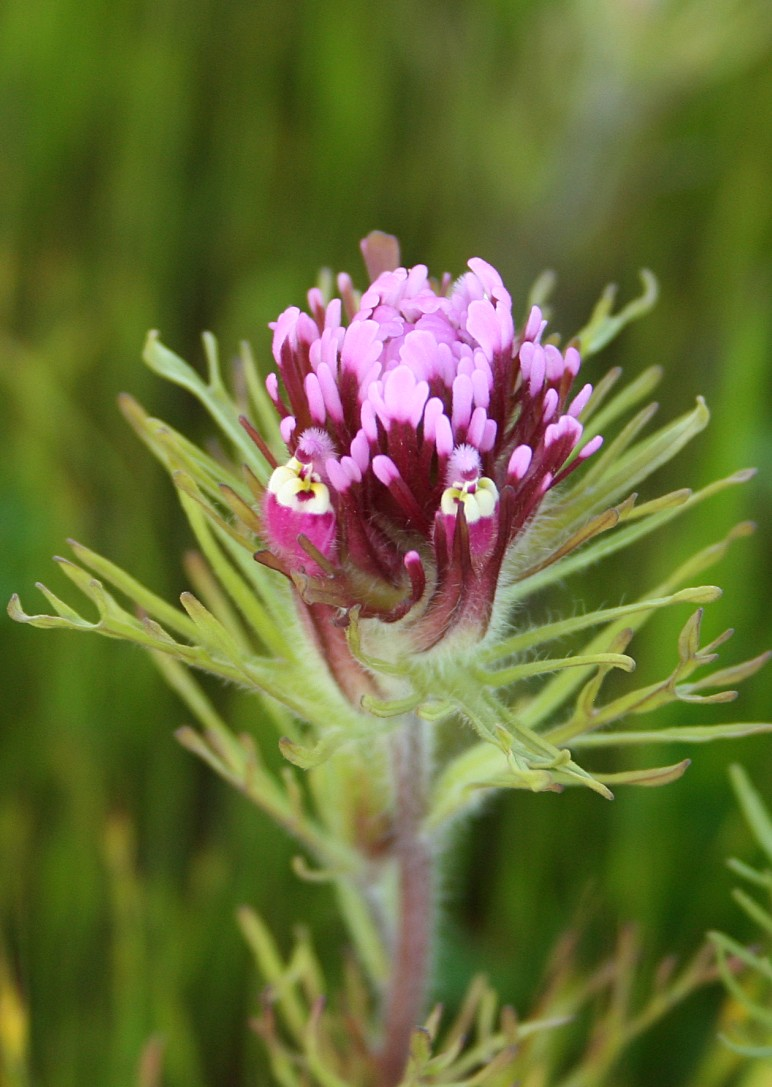

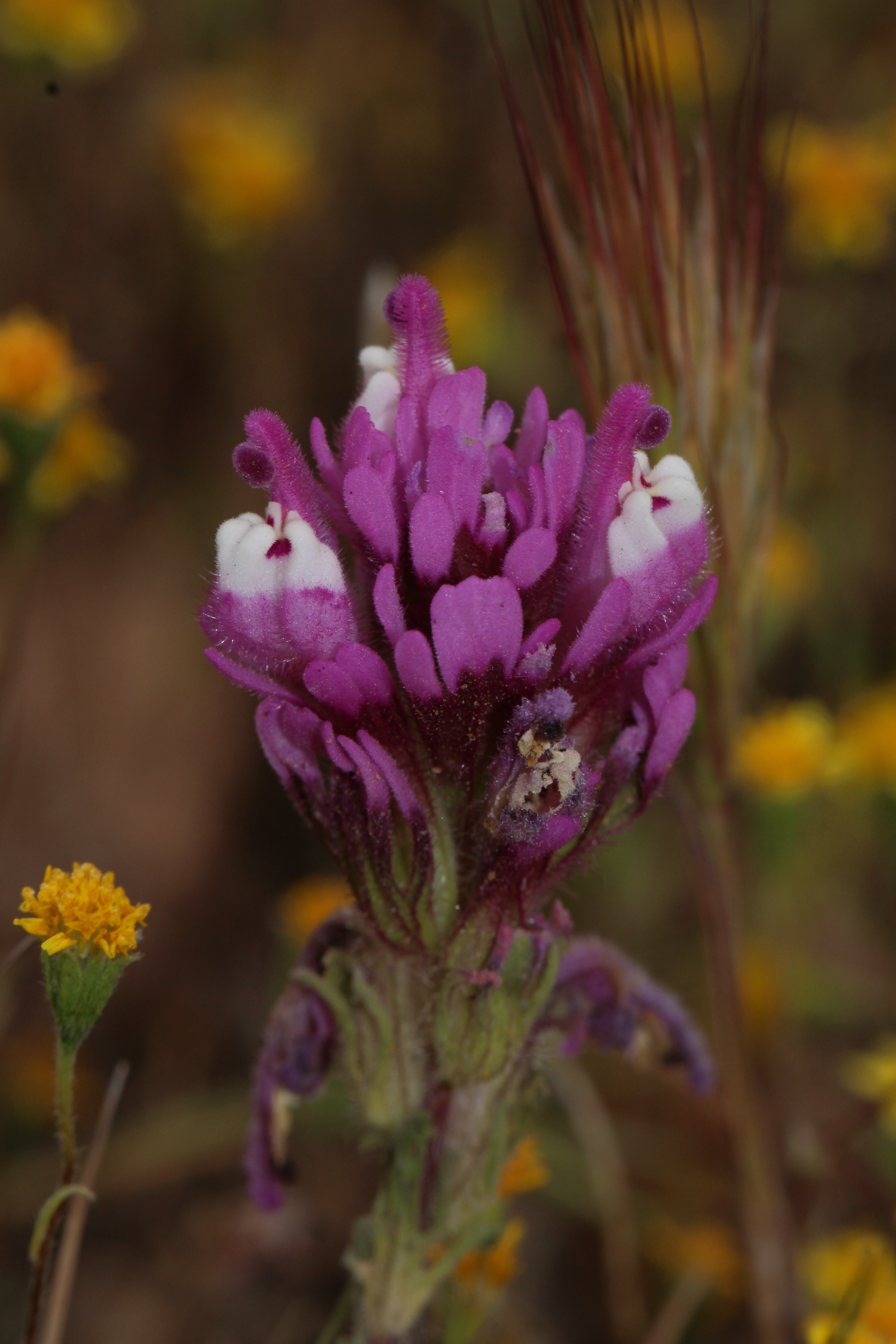
2015

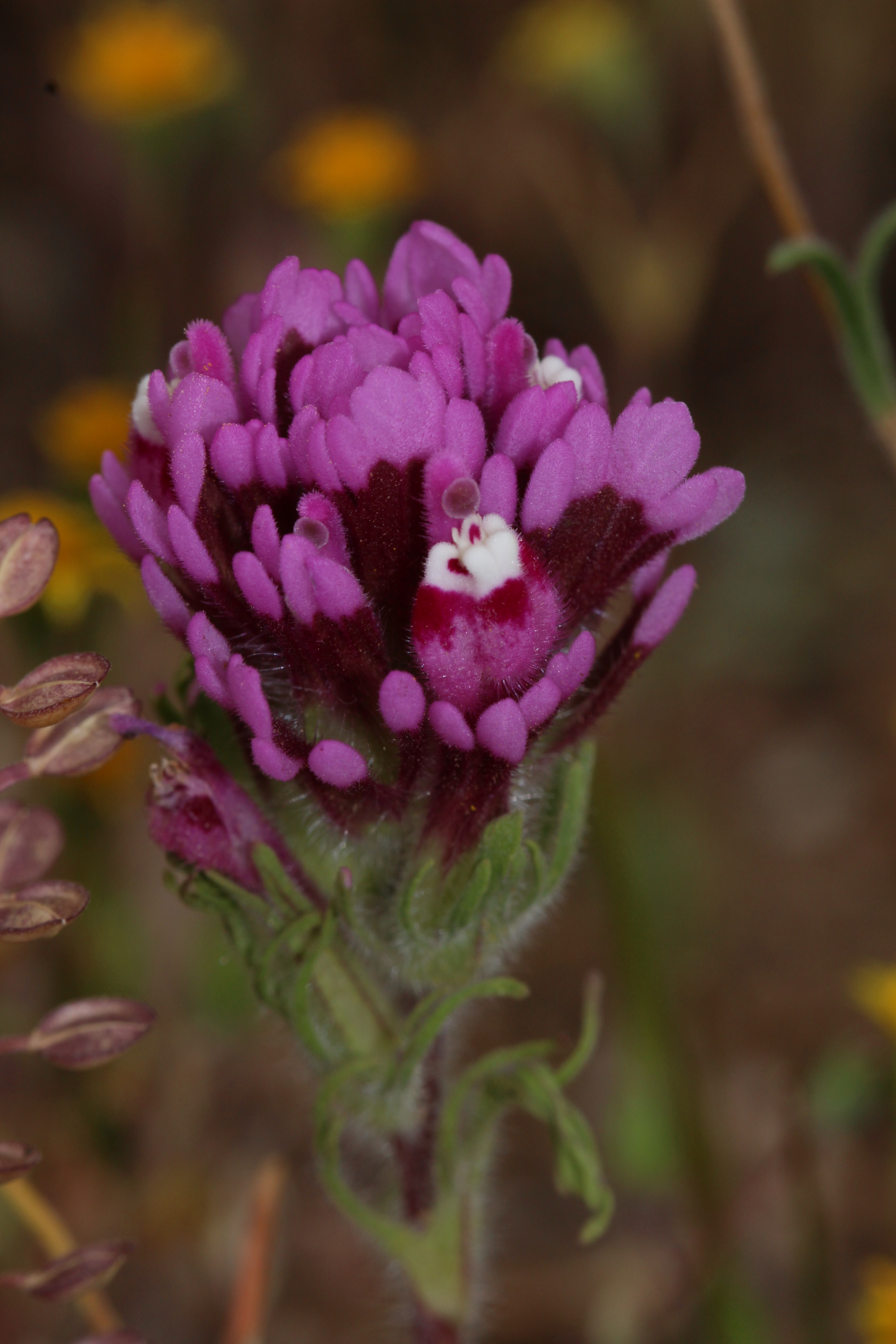
Antelope Valley Purple owl's clover
