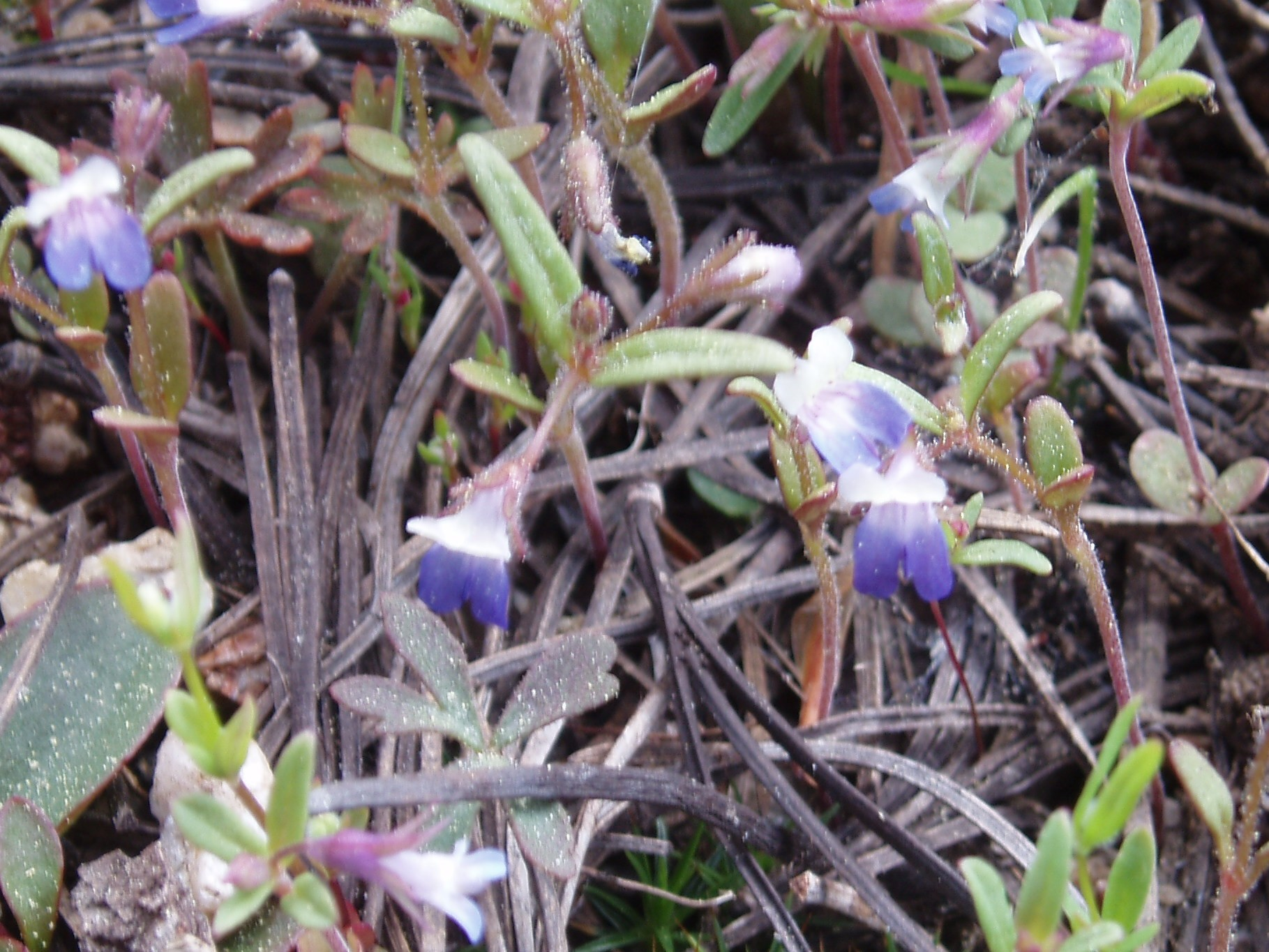

Scientific classification
- Kingdom: Plantae
- Clade: Tracheophytes
- Clade: Angiosperms
- Clade: Eudicots
- Clade: Asterids
- Order: Lamiales
- Family: Plantaginaceae
- Genus: Collinsia
- Species: C. torreyi

Binomial name
- Collinsia torreyi A.Gray

= Collinsia torreyi =

Species of plant in the plantain family

Collinsia torreyi is a species of flowering plant in the plantain family known by the common name Torrey's blue-eyed Mary. It is native to California and adjacent sections of Oregon and Nevada, where it grows in the coniferous forests of several mountain ranges, including the Sierra Nevada.

This is an annual herb producing a slender, reddish stem up to about 25 centimeters tall. The inflorescence is a densely glandular array of flowers arising on pedicels. The corolla is no more than a centimeter long and two white or lavender-tinted upper lobes and three darker lavender to purple lower lobes.

There are several varieties:

- C. t. var. brevicarinata - known from the Sierra Nevada and San Gabriel Mountains of California
- C. t. var. latifolia - known from northern California and southern Oregon
- C. t. var. torreyi - known from California and western Nevada
- C. t. var. wrightii (syn. Collinsia wrightii), limited to California and western Nevada
