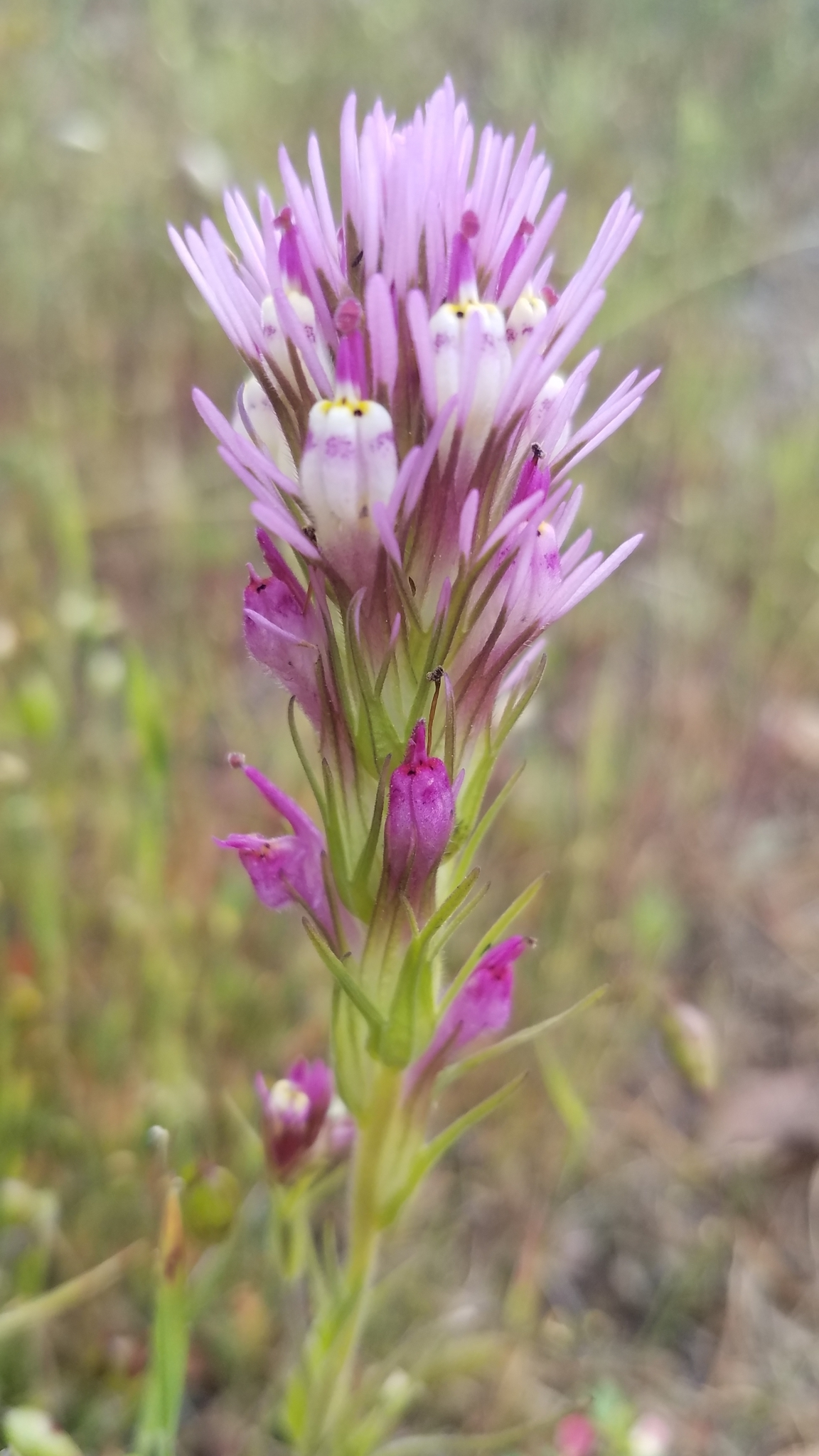

Scientific classification
- Kingdom: Plantae
- Clade: Tracheophytes
- Clade: Angiosperms
- Clade: Eudicots
- Clade: Asterids
- Order: Lamiales
- Family: Orobanchaceae
- Genus: Castilleja
- Species: C. densiflora

Binomial name
- Castilleja densiflora (Benth.) T.I.Chuang & Heckard

= Castilleja densiflora =

Species of flowering plant

Castilleja densiflora is a herbaceous flowering plant species known by the common names denseflower Indian paintbrush or white / denseflower owlclover. Like other members of the Indian paintbrushes, it is a root-parasite. It is native to California and northern Baja California, where it grows in grassland and chaparral habitat. It is a variable species. It is generally 10 to 40 centimeters tall with linear or lance-shaped leaves up to 8 centimeters long, and with or without lobes. The inflorescence is as small as 3 centimeters or as long as 25 centimeters in length, and has bracts tipped in white to dull or bright pink or purple. Between the bracts appear the flowers, which are somewhat rounded and pouched, and white to yellow to pink or purple in color.

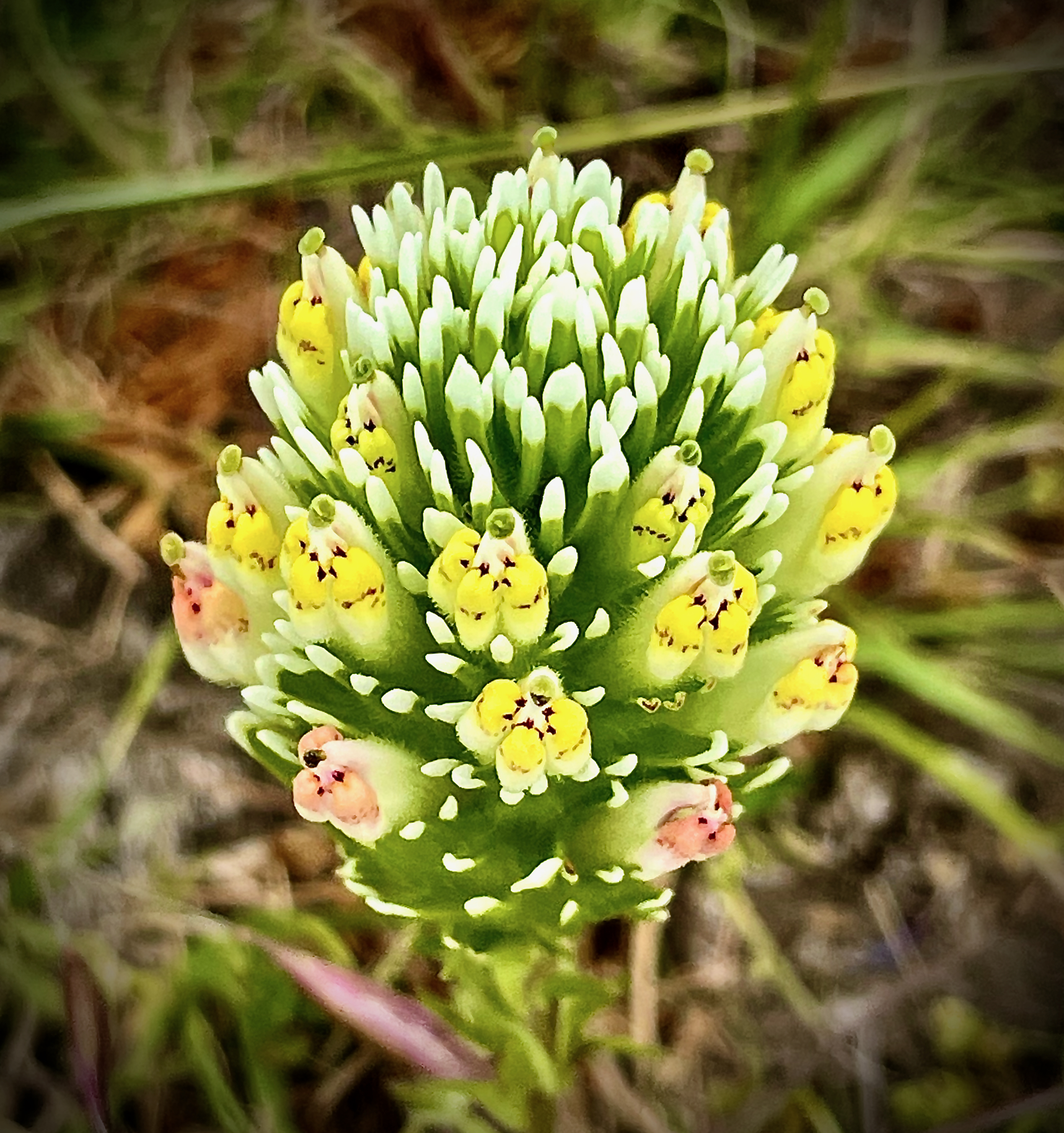
Castilleja densiflora ssp. obispoensis, ssp. endemic to SLO County
