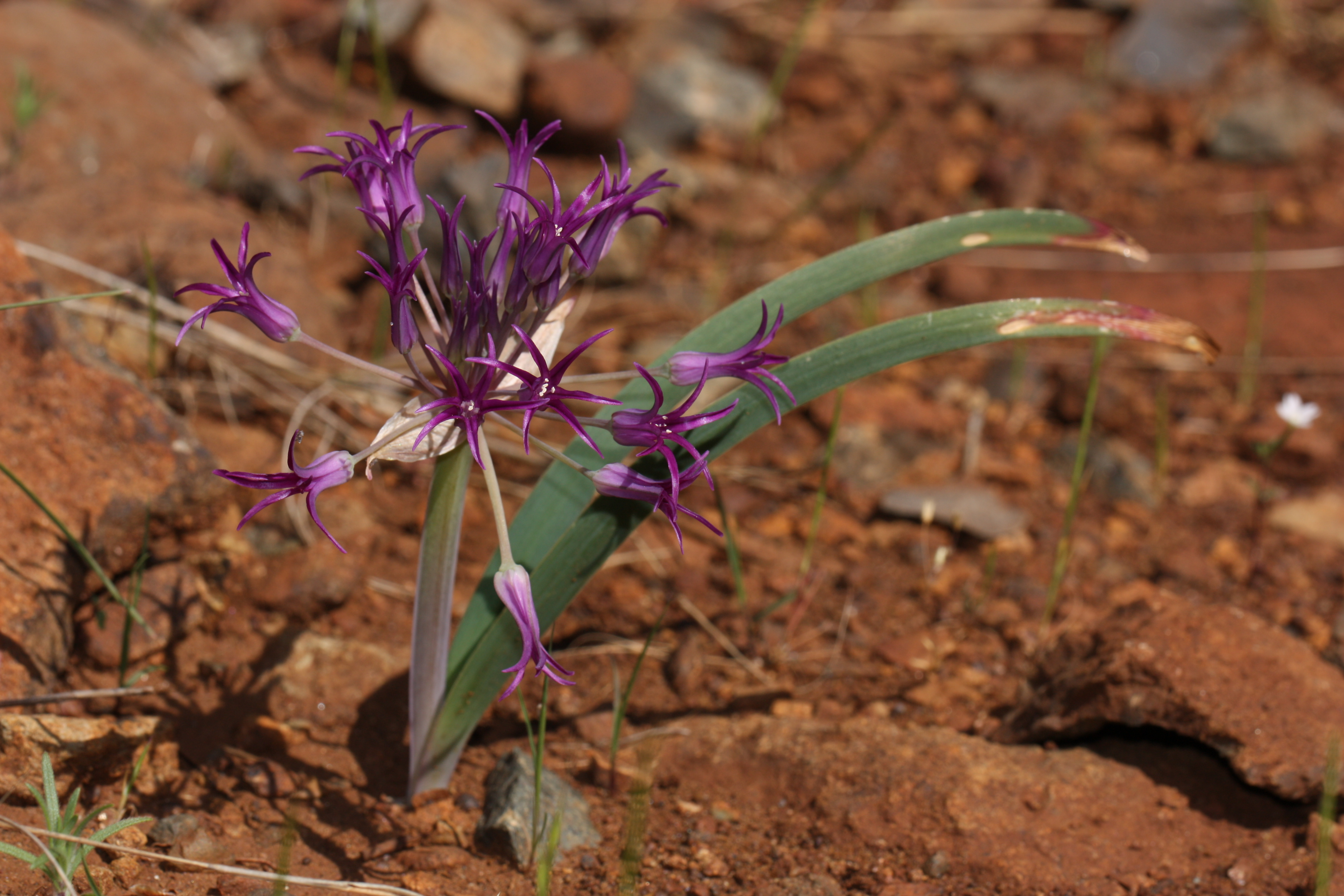

Scientific classification
- Kingdom: Plantae
- Clade: Tracheophytes
- Clade: Angiosperms
- Clade: Monocots
- Order: Asparagales
- Family: Amaryllidaceae
- Subfamily: Allioideae
- Genus: Allium
- Subgenus: A. subg. Amerallium
- Species: A. falcifolium

Binomial name
- Allium falcifolium Hook. & Arn.

Synonyms
- Allium breweri S.Watson; Allium falcifolium var. breweri (S.Watson) M.E.Jones

= Allium falcifolium =

Species of flowering plant

Allium falcifolium is a North American species of wild onion known by the common name scytheleaf onion or coast flatstem onion. It is native to northern California and southern Oregon, where it grows in heavy, rocky soils, especially serpentine soils.

== Description ==
Allium falcifolium, grows from a reddish-brown bulb one to two centimeters wide. The reddish or yellowish green stem is flattened such that it is thick in the center and thin along the edges. There are usually two leaves, which, as its common name suggests, are curved like the blade of a scythe. The stem is short and topped with an inflorescence of 10 to 30 flowers, each of which is one to one and a half centimeters wide. Each flower has six pinkish, red-purple, or white-streaked purple tepals.

== formerly included ==
The name Allium falcifolium var. demissum Jeps. was coined in 1921, referring to the taxon now known as Allium siskiyouense Ownbey ex Traub.
