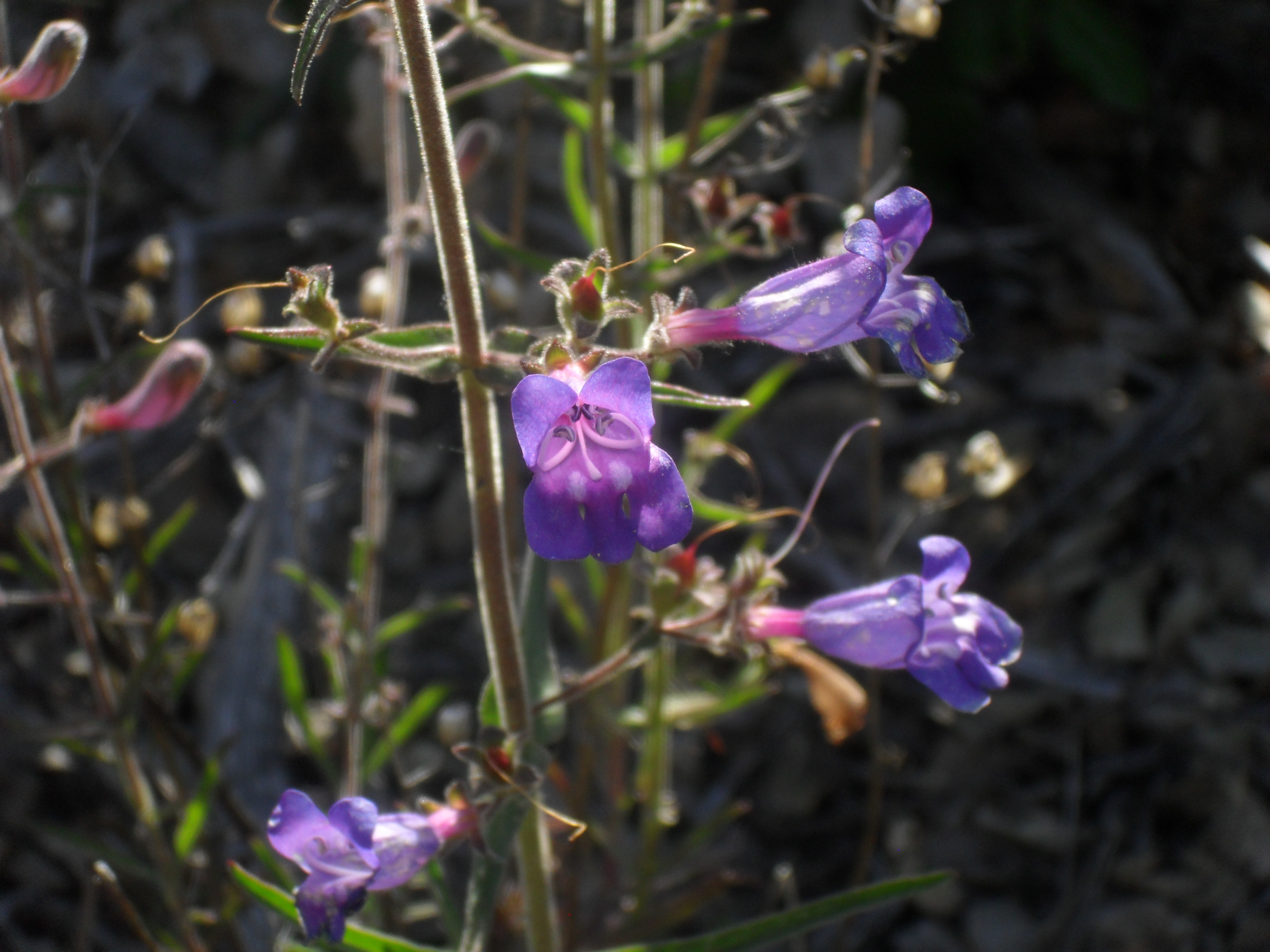

Scientific classification
- Kingdom: Plantae
- Clade: Tracheophytes
- Clade: Angiosperms
- Clade: Eudicots
- Clade: Asterids
- Order: Lamiales
- Family: Plantaginaceae
- Genus: Sairocarpus
- Species: S. cornutus

Binomial name
- Sairocarpus cornutus (Benth.) D.A.Sutton

Synonyms
- Antirrhinum cornutum Benth.; Of subsp. cornutus: Antirrhinum emarginatum Eastw.; Antirrhinum leptopetalum Frye & Rigg; Of subsp. leptaleus: Antirrhinum leptaleum A.Gray

= Sairocarpus cornutus =

Species of flowering plant

Sairocarpus cornutus, synonym Antirrhinum cornutum, is an uncommon species of New World flowering plant in the family Plantaginaceae, known by the common name spurred snapdragon.

It is endemic to northern California, where it grows in the inland mountains and the northern reaches of the Central Valley. This is an annual herb producing hairy, erect, non-climbing stems. Solitary flowers grow in the leaf axils along the stem. Each hairy-lipped flower is purple-veined white and about a centimeter long.

== Subspecies ==
As of February 2024, Plants of the World Online accepted two subspecies:

- Sairocarpus cornutus subsp. cornutus
- Sairocarpus cornutus subsp. leptaleus (A.Gray) Barringer
