= Euphydryas editha luestherae =

Scientific classification
- Domain: Eukaryota
- Kingdom: Animalia
- Phylum: Arthropoda
- Class: Insecta
- Order: Lepidoptera
- Family: Nymphalidae
- Genus: Euphydryas
- Species: E. editha
- Subspecies: E. e. luestherae

Trinomial name
- Euphydryas editha luestherae Murphy and Ehrlich, 1980

Subspecies of butterfly

Euphydryas editha luestherae, or LuEsther's checkerspot, is a butterfly native to the U.S. state of California that is included in the brush-footed butterfly family Nymphalidae and the tribe Melitaeini. It is a subspecies of Edith's checkerspot (Euphydryas editha), and it was described in 1980 by Dennis D. Murphy and Paul R. Ehrlich. The common and scientific names honor LuEsther Mertz.
