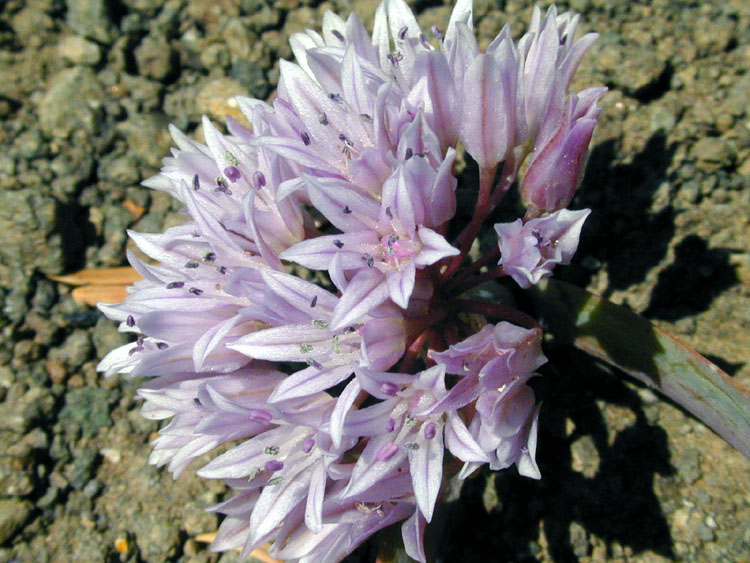

Scientific classification
- Kingdom: Plantae
- Clade: Tracheophytes
- Clade: Angiosperms
- Clade: Monocots
- Order: Asparagales
- Family: Amaryllidaceae
- Subfamily: Allioideae
- Genus: Allium
- Subgenus: A. subg. Amerallium
- Species: A. siskiyouense

Binomial name
- Allium siskiyouense F.M.Ownbey ex Traub

Synonyms
- Allium falcifolium var. demissum Jeps.; Allium siskiyouense Ownbey in Munz & Keck 1959, not validly published, no Latin description

= Allium siskiyouense =

Siskiyou onion

Species of flowering plant

Allium siskiyouense is a North American species of wild onion known by the common name Siskiyou onion. It is native to the Klamath Mountains and nearby ranges of northern California and Oregon. It grows in serpentine and other rocky soil types.

This small onion plant grows from a reddish-brown bulb 1 or 2 cm (1/3 or 2/3 in) long. It produces a short stem no more than 8 cm (3 in) long and two sickle-shaped leaves which are usually longer. The inflorescence contains up to about 35 flowers, each with dark-veined pink tepals around 1 cm (1/3 in) long and sometimes toothed at the tips.
