= Edith's checkerspot =

- E. e. beani Banff National Park, AB, Canada

Scientific classification
- Kingdom: Animalia
- Phylum: Arthropoda
- Clade: Pancrustacea
- Class: Insecta
- Order: Lepidoptera
- Family: Nymphalidae
- Genus: Euphydryas
- Species: E. editha

Binomial name
- Euphydryas editha (Boisduval, 1852)

Subspecies
- See text

Species of butterfly

Edith's checkerspot (Euphydryas editha) is a species of butterfly in the family Nymphalidae. It is a resident species of western North America and among the subspecies, entomologists have long been intrigued by their many phenotypic variations in coloration, wing length, and overall body size. Most populations are monophagous and rely on plants including Plantago erecta, Pedicularis semibarbata, Collinsia torreyi and Orthocarpus densiflorus as their host species in developing from eggs through to larvae, pupae, and mature butterflies. Males exhibit polygyny whereas females rarely mate more than once. Males devote most of their attention to mate acquisition, and such mate locating strategies such as hilltopping behavior have developed. Climate change, range shifts and habitat destruction have impacted certain subspecies. Three subspecies in particular, Euphydryas editha quino, Euphydryas editha bayensis and Euphydryas editha taylori, are currently under protection via the Endangered Species Act.

== Description ==
The Edith's checkerspot can be identified by its wings which are black with red and pale yellow or white bands. It also has a submarginal band that consists of yellow or white spots along with a wide postmedian band that is red. The undersides of the wings consists of alternating bands of yellow orange and cream. The wingspan is 3.2 to 5.1 centimetres (1.3 to 2.0 in). However, the subspecies of Edith's checkerspot vary slightly in appearance based on the areas they routinely inhabit. Coastal populations are black with red and cream spots; mountain populations are red or mottled with red, black, and cream spots. The higher-altitude populations are smaller and darker. The larvae of the butterfly are black, spotted with white or orange, or striped with white. The pupae are white or gray, with black blotches and streaks.

== Distribution ==
The Edith's checkerspot is found in North America, where it ranges from southern British Columbia and Alberta south to Baja California, Nevada, Utah, and Colorado. The species can be found in locations of the San Bernardino Mountains, Sierra Nevada, higher Cascade Mountains of Oregon to Washington, and in areas of the Great Basin, including central Oregon and the Rocky Mountains. It can also be found on several trails such as Animas River Trail, Falls Creek Trail, Colorado Trail, Hermosa Creek Trail, Engineer Mountain Trail, and Spud Lake Trail.

== Habitat ==
Habitats are mountains, typically on ridgetops, from coastal chaparral and transition zone open woodland to alpine tundra. Edith's checkerspot butterflies prefer grasslands and rocky outcrops found in the mountains. They can be frequently found in areas of nutrient-poor, serpentine soils which sustain the native grasslands that they prefer. They can also be spotted around streams or rock pools which males visit to drink and absorb minerals and salts from the waters.

=== Host plants ===
Edith's checkerspot caterpillars will use various species of paintbrush (Castilleja), beardtongues (Penstemon), lousewort (Pedicularis), owl's clover (Orthocarpus), Chinese houses (Collinsia), and plantain (Plantago) as host plants. Many populations of the butterfly are monophagous and preference for the different plant types are based mainly on location. Many behaviors, such as egg laying habits and movements are locally adapted, so the survival of the butterflies relies heavily on the growing season of these host plants.

=== Feeding ===
Populations of Edith's checkerspots use several different hosts to house and feed their larvae. Though they usually do not pollinate the flowers of the host, larvae have been known to eat the leaves, the flowers, and sometimes the entire host plant, and have starved trying to find another. Adult females and females feed on flower nectar. Caterpillars feed on leaves and flowers of the host plant and sometimes surrounding plants. Pre-diapause larvae tend to show stronger preference for particular host plants and only feed on the plant where they hatch from the egg, wheareas post-diapause larve are more generalist and feed on a variety of plants.

=== Host plant preference ===
Different populations of Edith's checkerspot butterflies show strong preference for specific host plants, depending on the availability of plants in their habitat. This preference appears to be heritable and has been extensively studied by Michael C. Singer and Camille Parmesan who developed a method to test the strength of the butterfly's preference for a host plant (the discrimination index). This was done by repeatedly exposing the butterflies to their least preferred host plant and recording how long they would continue to refuse it, before accepting and laying eggs on their least preferred host. Based on this, one can then calculate the discrimination index and the strength of preference for a particular host plant. This means that the preference for a particular host plant is a heritable trait that is passed down through generations in this butterfly. In addition, new research is now studying the genetic basis of this heritable host plant preference at the molecular level.

== Life cycle ==
Oviposition begins within a day of the female's emergence, with females depositing masses of up to hundreds of eggs at the base of host plants. The size of egg clutches varies strongly by population and host plant used, with plants such as Collinsia torreyi typically hosting clutches of between 20 - 50 eggs, while Pedicularis semibarbata typically hosts clutches of up to 200 eggs. Most populations are monophagous, with females normally ovipositing on only one of several potential host species. Such plants include Plantago erecta, Pedicularis semibarbata, Collinsia torreyi and Orthocarpus densiflorus.

The eggs further develop into pre-diapause larvae whose goal is to enter diapause and reach the fourth instar before their annual host plants senesce. Thus, females try to enhance offspring survival by laying egg masses on cool moist slopes where host plant senescence is most delayed. Once the larvae reach the diapause stage, they stay dormant over the winter months. When spring comes, the larvae break their diapause and become post-diapause larvae, they must grow by basking in the sunlight to regulate their body temperature. Larval body temperature is about 10–12 °C (50–54 °F) above ambient temperature, and the fastest growth rate occurs at 30–35 °C (86–95 °F). They must receive enough insolation to terminate the diapause stage, grow to pupation and become a fully-grown butterfly. Thus, the paradox is that these larvae no longer prefer the cool slopes of host plants they grew up on, as it produces shade that restricts growth.

== Predation ==
Caterpillars in the genus Euphydryas are usually attacked by one to three parasitoid species, often by a species of Apanteles wasp (Braconidae), a species of Benjaminia wasp (Ichneumonidae), and a tachnid fly. Checkerspot butterflies have developed defense mechanisms to prevent predators from attacking. Larvae twitch in unison to repel predators, and, depending on the host plant of the population, the larvae, pupae, and adult butterflies are somewhat poisonous to vertebrates because they may ingest toxins from the plant.

== Mating system ==
Male Edith's checkerspot butterflies exhibit polygyny and may mate with multiple females. Females, on the other hand, mate once or occasionally twice. Newly eclosed females remain motionless on the ground in low vegetation for about an hour after eclosion while their wings harden. During this time they cannot fly or easily reject courting males. Thus, the first mate to locate a female usually mates with her. Virgin females release a pheromone which attracts males. Hidden virgins are found by males after an average of fifty minutes.

=== Remating prevention ===
There are at least two mechanisms evolved to prevent females from remating: physical and neurological/behavioral. The physical mechanism involves a literal physical barrier. When the male's spermatophore is deposited into the female's bursa copulatrix, the spermatophore has a long neck that can act as a mating plug to seal it and prevent further mating. However, some second matings occur before the plug has hardened or if the plug erodes. The second, neurological, inhibition mechanism involves mate rejection behavior in which the female flaps and tries to escape. This behavior is stimulated by the neural sensation of bursal distention, which occurs in the presence of a spermatophore.

Female and male Edith's checkerspots mating

However, even with these prevention mechanisms, females do occasionally mate a second time. In instances where females mate with several males, they lay eggs which have been predominantly fertilized by the sperm of the last male to mate. This is the process of last male sperm precedence, and can be explained by the fact that the last sperm to enter and be stored in the spermatheca of the female is also usually the first to leave.

== Paternal investment ==
In Edith's checkerspots, average spermatophore weight is about 2.5% of male body weight, a figure that is quite small compared to the spermatophores donated by other species of male butterflies during copulation. Though larger males usually produce heavier spermatophores, neither spermatophore weight nor male body weight influence the number of eggs laid or the percentage of eggs hatched. The spermatophore transferred at mating does not constitute as paternal investment, as spermatophore weight has little effect on female reproductive output. In fact, Edith's checkerspot females emerge from eclosion with all oocytes present and a portion already yolked, further limiting the role of the male spermatophore.

Most male reproductive effort is devoted not to the production of a spermatophore, but to the acquisition of females, especially virgin females. Males often exhibit indiscriminate mate location behavior, which is characterized by males failing to distinguish between female conspecifics and other objects, frequently resulting in misdirected courtship or attempted copulation. Because the cost of mistakes is low (low investment in spermatophores) and potential reward (location of receptive female) is high, indiscriminate behavior can become advantageous. However, in some cases, males become attracted to spider webs containing dead conspecifics, mistaking the motionless bodies in the webs for teneral females, and attempt copulation. This puts them at risk of death, showing that there is a risk of male mortality associated with indiscriminate mate location behavior. However, the benefit outweighs the cost, and indiscriminate mate location behavior prevails.

== Mate locating strategy ==
=== Indiscriminate mate location ===
Most male reproductive effort is devoted not to the production of a spermatophore, but to the acquisition of females, especially virgin females. Males often exhibit indiscriminate mate location behavior, which is characterized by males failing to distinguish between female conspecifics and other objects, frequently resulting in misdirected courtship or attempted copulation. Because the cost of mistakes is low (low investment in spermatophores) and potential reward (location of receptive female) is high, indiscriminate behavior can become advantageous. However, in some cases, males become attracted to spider webs containing dead conspecifics, mistaking the motionless bodies in the webs for teneral females, and attempt copulation. This puts them at risk of death, showing that there is a risk of male mortality associated with indiscriminate mate location behavior. However, the benefit outweighs the cost, and indiscriminate mate location behavior prevails.

=== Perching, patrolling, and hilltopping ===
Edith's checkerspot males sometimes form aggregations on patches of bare ground like ridges or peaks, and from these perches they dart after passing males and females of both their conspecifics (own species) and heterospecifics (other species). This strategy is called perching. Another strategy is termed "patrolling" and consists of males wandering in search of mates. In years of low population density, the hilltopping behavior may become adaptive. In such instances, males concentrate in mating aggregations at the highest point of a slope and females must travel up the slope after eclosion to mate. After mating, females return down the slope in order to minimize sexual harassment, and deposit eggs. Hilltopping occurs in small populations where there is a smaller chance for virgin females to encounter males before reaching the hilltop. Where populations are relatively dense; however, upslope movement may place these butterflies at a reproductive disadvantage.

== Evolution of protandry ==
This butterfly exhibits protandry. Males tend to emerge 4–8 days before females do and the average life span of both sexes is 10 days, though it can be as long as three weeks. Protandry may have an effect on the butterfly's mating success in a population. In many time constrained species such as the Edith's checkerspot, early season matings may have a higher probability of producing adults in the next generation than those later in the year. Pre-diapause larvae are under time pressure to mature to diapause size before host plants senesce in summer drought. Therefore, larvae hatching from eggs laid earlier in the season are more likely to have reached the intended size. This is why males mating at the beginning of the season are more likely to produce surviving offspring than males mating a few weeks later.

== Conservation status ==
The Edith's checkerspot subspecies mirror the changes in climate over long periods of time. Global warming is expected to eliminate the butterflies in the south throughout the upcoming years, where the season is becoming shorter and shorter. In areas of the lowest latitude, about three-fourths of the populations have become extinct. This is in contrast to higher latitude areas in Canada where less than twenty percent have disappeared. It has been found that population extinctions were four times as high along the southern boundaries (Baja and Mexico) than along the northern boundaries (Canada). In addition, extinctions are nearly three times as high at lower elevations below 8,000 feet (2,400 m) than at higher elevations from 8,000 to 12,500 feet (2,400 to 3,800 m). In agreement with global warming predictions, this extinction process has shifted the range of this butterfly both northward and upward in elevation since the 1800s.

In the case of Euphydryas editha quino, habitat destruction is the major reason for its decline, although climate change problems also pose a threat. Quino checkerspot populations along the southernmost boundary (in Mexico) are at the greatest risk from continuing warming and drying climate trends. Unfortunately, these are also the best remaining habitats with the lowest degree of threat from development. By contrast, most Quino habitat has been destroyed by development in the Los Angeles–San Diego corridor. The case of the Quino checkerspot has resulted in the first habitat recovery plan to list climate change not only as a current threat, but also as a factor that should be considered in reserve design and recovery management. Some sedentary checkerspots remain at their original habitats despite the continuation of human interference, and have evolved adaptations to deal with these changes.

The subspecies Euphydryas editha quino and Euphydryas editha bayensis received federal protection under the Endangered Species Act effective January 1997 and October 1987, respectively. The subspecies Euphydryas editha taylori was declared endangered by the U.S. Fish and Wildlife Service effective November 2013.

== Impact on humans ==
Edith's checkerspots lay their eggs on various plant species, sometimes resulting in the death of the host plant, which could be potentially economically important to humans. In addition, larvae, pupae, and adults are poisonous to vertebrates if ingested. A plus for humans, alongside the butterfly's natural beauty, includes pollination, because in order to obtain nectar, adult butterflies of the species sometimes pollinate various flowers in the area of their habitat.

== Subspecies ==
This species is often better known by the constituent subspecies listed below. It is subject to change as the nomenclature is altered or new subspecies are found.

- Euphydryas editha alebarki Ferris, 1971 – Klots' checkerspot
- Euphydryas editha augusta (Edwards, 1890) – Augusta checkerspot
- Euphydryas editha aurilacus Gunder, 1928 – Gold Lake checkerspot
- Euphydryas editha baroni Edwards, 1879 – Baron's checkerspot
- Euphydryas editha bayensis Sternitzky, 1937 – Bay checkerspot
- Euphydryas editha beani Skinner, 1897 – Bean's checkerspot
- Euphydryas editha bingi Baughman & Murphy, 1998 – Bing's checkerspot
- Euphydryas editha colonia (Wright, 1905) – Colonia checkerspot
- Euphydryas editha editha (Boisduval, 1852) – Edith's checkerspot
- Euphydryas editha edithana Strand, 1914 – Strand's checkerspot
- Euphydryas editha ehrlichi Baughmon and Murphy, 1998 – Ehrlich's checkerspot
- Euphydryas editha fridayi Gunder, 1931
- Euphydryas editha hutchinsi McDunnough, 1928 – Hutchins' checkerspot
- Euphydryas editha gunnisonensis Brown, 1971 – Gunnison checkerspot
- Euphydryas editha karinae Baughman & Murphy, 1998
- Euphydryas editha koreti Murphy and Ehrlich, 1983 – Koret's checkerspot
- Euphydryas editha insularis Emmel & Emmel, 1974 – Island checkerspot
- Euphydryas editha lawrencei Gunder, 1931 – Lawrence's checkerspot
- Euphydryas editha lehmani Gunder, 1929 – Lehman Caves checkerspot
- Euphydryas editha luestherae Murphy & Ehrlich, 1981 – LuEsther's checkerspot
- Euphydryas editha mattooni – Mattoon's checkerspot
- Euphydryas editha monoensis Gunder, 1928 – Mono Lake checkerspot
- Euphydryas editha nubigena Behr, 1863 – Cloud-born checkerspot
- Euphydryas editha owyheensis Austin & Murphy, 1998
- Euphydryas editha quino (Behr, 1863) – Quino checkerspot
- Euphydryas editha remingtoni Burdick, 1959
- Euphydryas editha rubicunda (H. Edwards, 1881) – Ruddy checkerspot
- Euphydryas editha tahoensis Austin & Murphy, 1998 – Lake Tahoe checkerspot
- Euphydryas editha taylori (Edwards, 1888) – Taylor's checkerspot
- Euphydryas editha wrighti Gunder, 1929 – Wright's checkerspot
