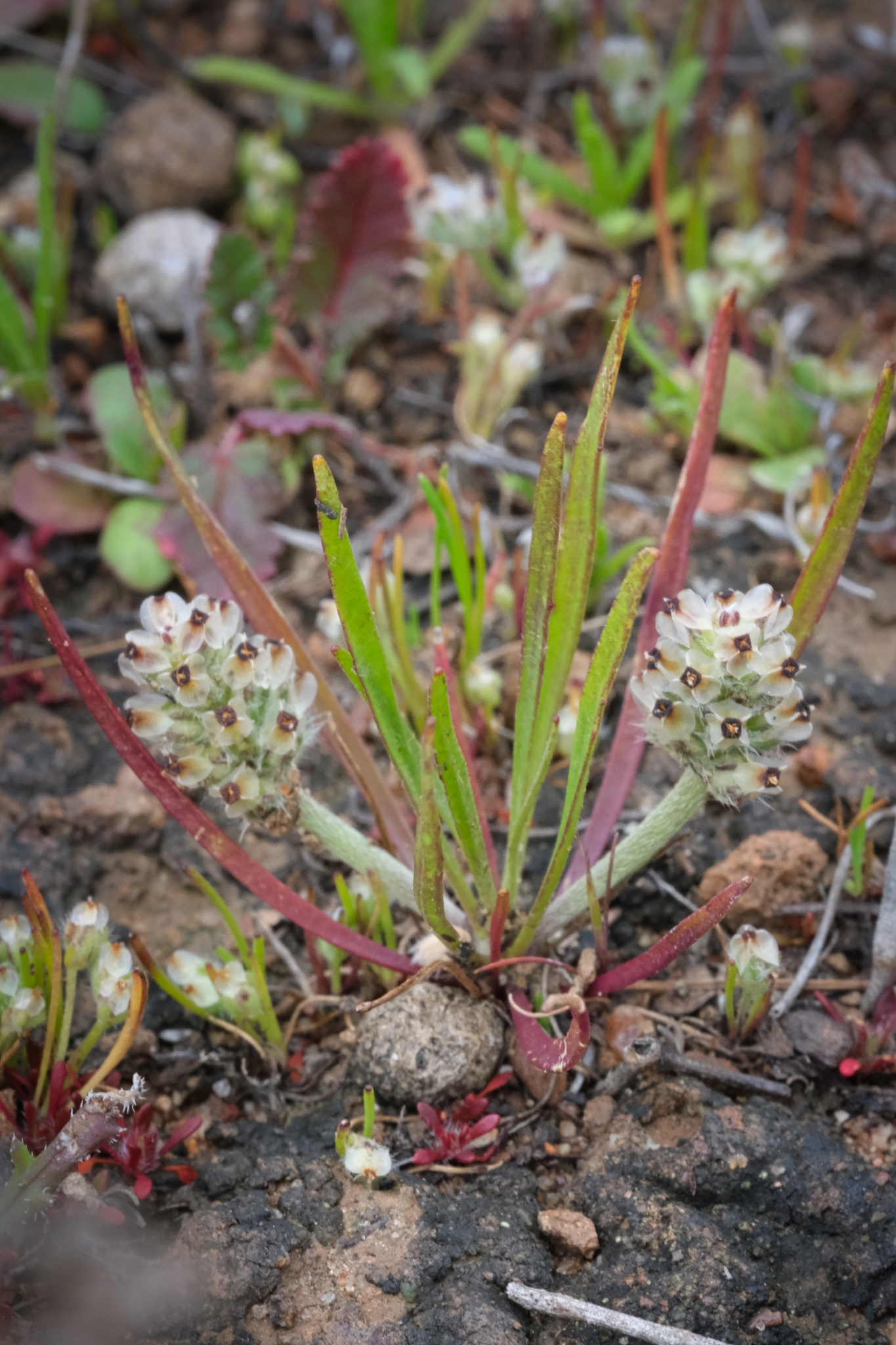

Scientific classification
- Kingdom: Plantae
- Clade: Embryophytes
- Clade: Tracheophytes
- Clade: Angiosperms
- Clade: Eudicots
- Clade: Asterids
- Order: Lamiales
- Family: Plantaginaceae
- Genus: Plantago
- Species: P. erecta

Binomial name
- Plantago erecta E.Morris

Synonyms
- Homotypic Synonyms: Plantago patagonica var. californica Greene (1894); Heterotypic Synonyms: Plantago dura E.Morris (1900); Plantago obversa E.Morris (1901); Plantago obversa subsp. rigidior Pilg. (1937); Plantago speciosa E.Morris (1901); Plantago tetrantha E.Morris (1900)

= Plantago erecta =

Species of flowering plant in the plantain family

Plantago erecta is a flowering plant in the plantain family, commonly known as the California plantain, foothill plantain, dot-seed plantain, English plantain, and dwarf plantain. Plantago erecta is a small, unassuming annual herb with needle-like leaves and translucent flowers clustered on a stalk. It grows in sandy, clay, or serpentine soils, on grassy slopes and flats or open woodland, found in Baja California, California and Oregon. Plantago erecta is a host species for the Edith's checkerspot butterfly.

== Distribution and habitat ==
Plantago erecta is native to the California Floristic Province, and is found in California, Oregon, and Baja California. It is found widely throughout California, except in the desert and northeastern portions of the state. In Baja California, Plantago erecta is found from the Mexico–United States border south to El Rosario and the Sierra de San Pedro Martir, but is also found in the southern part of the state in a disjunct distribution to the Sierra La Libertad.

Plantago erecta is most commonly found in sandy, clay, or serpentine substrates, and usually grows on grassy slopes, flats, dunes, openings between shrubs, and open woodland. Populations of this plant are usually patchy and localized, usually with many individuals. Ecoregions that this species is a member of include coastal sage scrub, chaparral, mountains, coastal succulent scrub, and at the southern end of its range in Baja California, desert.
