= Equine proximal enteritis =

Inflammatory intestinal disease in horses

Proximal enteritis, also known as anterior enteritis or duodenitis-proximal jejunitis (DPJ), is inflammation of the duodenum and upper jejunum. It produces a functional stasis of the affected intestine (ileus) and hypersecretion of fluid into the lumen of that intestine. This leads to large volumes of gastric reflux, dehydration, low blood pressure, and potentially shock. Although the exact cause is not yet definitively known, proximal enteritis requires considerable supportive care.

== Epidemiology ==
DPJ is most commonly seen in the Southeastern US, although cases have been reported throughout the United States and Canada, as well as sporadically in the United Kingdom and Europe. Horses in the Southeastern US tend to have a more severe form of the disease relative to other locations. Age, breed, and gender appear to have no effect on disease prevalence.

== Pathophysiology ==
The cause of proximal enteritis is not definitively known. Both Salmonella and Clostridial species have been isolated from gastric reflux contents of affected horses. Salmonella has not been consistently found in all horses with DPJ, although one study cultured toxigenic Clostridial species in 100% of affected horses. Other potential causes include Fusarium infection and recent increase in dietary concentrate levels, which can alter the microbial population within the intestinal lumen.

Inflammation of the intestine leads to the secretion of a large amounts of electrolytes, primarily sodium and chloride, into its lumen, resulting in the osmotic movement of water. The production of fluid is thought to be due to active hypersecretion, passive secretion of proteins secondary to damage to epithelium of the mucosa and capillaries, and a functional ileus which prevents removal of this fluid. Massive fluid production results in extensive reflux, usually produced at a rate of 50–100 mL/min, in addition to distention of the proximal small intestine, dehydration, and possible shock secondary to hypovolemia. Proximal enteritis can also occur with inflammation of other organs in the gastrointestinal tract, including gastritis, ileitis, typhlitis, and colitis.

== Clinical signs ==
Signs include acute onset of moderate to severe pain, large volumes of gastric reflux (4–20 L per decompression) which is usually orange-brown and fetid, distended small intestine (up to 5–7 cm in diameter) palpable on rectal examination, fever, depression, increased heart rate (>60 bpm), increased respiratory rate, prolonged CRT, and darkened mucous membranes. After gastric decompression, the horse may show signs of malaise and act lethargic, but pain level usually improves.

Abdominocentesis usually reveals a yellow, turbid fluid with an increased white blood cell count (usually 5,000–10,000 cells/microliter) and protein level (>3.5 g/dl), although the fluid may be serosanguinous in severe cases. A chemistry panel will often show electrolyte abnormalities (hypokalemia, hyponatremia, hypochloremia) due to electrolyte loss into the lumen of the intestine. Leukocytes may be normal, increased, or decreased. PCV and total protein are usually both increased due to fluid loss, and the horse displays a prerenal azotemia. On the chemistry panel, liver enzymes such as GGT, ALP, AST are increased, likely due to ascending infection from the common bile duct, endotoxin absorption, and hypoperfusion. A metabolic acidosis with a high anion gap is often seen due to loss of bicarbonate in gastric reflux and an increase in lactic acid in the blood, secondary to hypovolemia and decreased tissue perfusion.

== Differential diagnoses ==
It is important to differentiate DPI from small intestinal obstruction, since obstruction may require surgical intervention, but this can at times be difficult. Horses suffering from DPI usually have a higher protein concentration in their peritoneal fluid compared to horses with small intestinal obstruction, often without a concurrent increase in nucleated cell count. They usually have some relief and decrease in pain after gastric decompression, while horses with an obstruction often still act colicky after nasogastric intubation. Distention of the small intestine may be less than what is felt on rectal examination of horses with obstruction, especially after gastric decompression. Horses with DPJ usually produce larger volumes of reflux (usually greater than 48 liters in the first 24 hours) than those with obstruction, and are often pyretic (temperatures of 101.5–102.5) and have alterations in white blood cell levels, while those with obstructions usually have a normal or lower than normal temperature and normal leukocyte levels.

Ultrasound can also be helpful to distinguish DPJ from obstruction. Horses with small intestinal obstruction will usually have an intestinal diameter of −10 cm with a wall thickness of 3–5mm. Horses with proximal enteritis usually have an intestinal diameter that is narrower, but wall thickness is often greater than 6mm, containing a hyperechoic or anechoic fluid, with normal, increased, or decreased peristalsis. However, obstructions that have been present for some time may present with thickened walls and distention of the intestine.

DPJ can only be definitively diagnosed during surgery or at necropsy, when its gross appearance of the small intestine may be evaluated.

== Treatment ==
Proximal enteritis usually is managed medically. This includes nasogastric intubation every 1–2 hours to relieve gastric pressure secondary to reflux, which often produces to 2–10 L, as well as aggressive fluid support to maintain hydration and correct electrolyte imbalances. Maintaining hydration in these patients can be very challenging. In some cases, fluid support may actually increase reflux production, due to the decreased intravascular oncotic pressure from low total protein and albumin levels, leading to loss of much of these IV fluids into the intestinal lumen. These horses will often display dependent edema (edema that collects in locations based on gravity). Colloids such as plasma or Hetastarch may be needed to improve intravascular oncotic pressure, although they can be cost prohibitive for many owners. Reflux levels are monitored closely to help evaluate fluid losses, and horses recovering from DPJ show improved hydration with decreased reflux production and improved attitude.

Non-steroidal anti-inflammatory drugs (NSAIDs) are commonly used for pain relief, reduction of inflammation, and for their anti-endotoxin effects, but care must be taken since they may produce gastrointestinal ulceration and damage the kidneys. Due to a suspected link to Clostridial infection, anti-microbials are often administered, usually penicillin or metronidazole. Aminoglycosides should be used with extreme caution due to the risk of nephrotoxicosis (damage to the kidney). The mucosa of the intestines is damaged with DPJ, often resulting in absorption of endotoxin and risking laminitis, so therapy to combat and treat endotoxemia is often employed. This includes treatment with drugs that counteract endotoxin such as Polymyxin B and Bio-Sponge, fluid support, and laminitis prevention such as icing of the feet. Prokinetic drugs such as lidocaine, erythromycin, metoclopramide, and bethanechol are often used to treat the ileus associated with the disease.

Horses are withheld food until reflux returns to less than 1–2 L of production every 4 hours, and gut sounds return, often requiring 3–7 days of therapy. Parenteral nutrition is often provided to horses that are withheld feed for greater than 3–4 days. It is suspected to improve healing and shorten the duration of the illness, since horses often become cachexic due to the protein losing enteropathy associated with this disease.

Surgery may need to be performed to rule out colic with similar presenting signs such as obstruction or strangulation, and in cases that are long-standing (> 7 days) to perform a resection and anastomosis of the diseased bowel. However, some horses have recovered with long-term medical support (up to 20 days).

== Complications and survival ==
Horses may develop pharyngitis, laryngitis, or esophagitis secondary to indwelling nasogastric tube. Other complications include thrombophlebitis, laminitis (which subsequently reduces survival rate), and weight loss. Horses are also at increased risk of hepatic injury.

Survival rates for DPJ are 25–94%. Horses that survive the incident rarely have reoccurrence.
