= Fibre supplements =

Functional dietary fibre

Fibre supplements (also spelled fiber supplements) are considered to be a form of a subgroup of functional dietary fibre, and in the United States are defined by the Institute of Medicine (IOM). According to the IOM, functional fibre "consists of isolated, non-digestible carbohydrates that have beneficial physiological effects in humans".

Fibre supplements are widely available, and can be found in forms such as powders, tablets, and capsules. Consumption of fibre supplements may be for improving dietary intake, lowering blood cholesterol, alleviating irritable bowel syndrome, reducing the risk of colon cancer, and increasing feelings of satiety.

Excessive fibre intake can lead to fluid imbalance, dehydration, mineral deficiencies, nutrient and drug interactions, and other medical problems.

== Rationale for fibre supplement use ==
The American Dietetic Association recommends that the average adult consume 25 to 38 grams of dietary fibre per day. However, research has shown that the average American only consumes 14 to 15 grams per day. To reach the recommended amount of fibre, consumption of dietary fibre from foods (e.g. plants, vegetables, legumes, and grains) instead of supplements is preferred because they contain additional beneficial nutrients and non-nutritive components (e.g. antioxidants and phytoestrogens). Nevertheless, a fibre supplement may be needed to prevent constipation when fibre intake via food is low, which is the case among many inactive elderly people. A cereal bran such as psyllium seed husk, or a synthetic fiber such as methylcellulose is often used in this case.

== Health claims ==
=== Blood cholesterol reduction ===
Foods that are high in viscous fibres have been found to lower blood cholesterol by binding with bile acids. In order to compensate for this, cholesterol from the liver may be used to make more bile acids. The products of bacterial fermentation in the colon may also decrease the rate of cholesterol synthesis in the liver.

However, research has produced mixed results with respect to whether fibre supplements are as effective as dietary fibre in reducing blood cholesterol. Two recent studies show nearly opposing results, using fibre-supplemented apple juice containing both the soluble pectin from apples and gum arabic. In the first study, the supplement-enriched juice had no discernible effect on the blood cholesterol levels of 110 hypercholesterolaemic men and women. In the second study, the total and LDL-cholesterol levels of mildly hypercholesterolaemic men were lowered.

In another study, a dietary supplement consisting of both soluble fibre (guar gum, pectin) and insoluble fibre (soy fibre, pea fibre, corn bran) was found to reduce LDL-cholesterol for individuals that have mild to moderate hypercholesterolaemia without reducing HDL-cholesterol or increasing triglycerides.

Supplements containing extracted insoluble fibre may have an effect on blood lipids that most resembles the effects of dietary fibre. In a more recent randomized, double blind clinical study of 58 hypercholesterolaemic volunteers, an extruded carob pulp preparation added to daily diet reduced total and LDL-cholesterol and improved the ratio of HDL:LDL cholesterol in all participants, and also showed a marked reduction in serum cholesterol in the women of the study.

=== Gastrointestinal health ===
==== Colorectal cancer ====
The protective properties of dietary fibre against colorectal cancer are undisputed. However, not all fibre supplements seem to provide the same defensive effect. A study of 1429 men and women over six months showed that a high-fibre cereal (wheat bran) supplement had no protective effect on recurring colorectal adenomas. In addition, no significant improvement in the proportion or features of existing colorectal adenomas was observed.

==== Diverticular disease ====
Diverticulitis is mainly attributed to the low fibre intake commonly found in the Western diet for which a gradual increase in dietary fibre over several weeks is a commonly prescribed clinical solution. Fibre supplementation has been found to be less effective than dietary fibre in this regard. One study of 58 men and women with uncomplicated diverticulitis in a double-blind controlled trial concluded that common doses of wheat bran and a psyllium-derived supplement provided relief of constipation only, with no other observable effects.

==== Irritable bowel syndrome ====
Irritable bowel syndrome (IBS) is a common gastrointestinal ailment for which dietary soluble fibre is often prescribed as part of a therapeutic solution. As a supplement, partially hydrolysed guar gum (PHGG - completely soluble, fully fermentable) has been shown to be quite effective in clinical trials for decreasing IBS symptoms such as abdominal pain and generally improving quality of life for sufferers well beyond treatment. In addition, PHGG has been shown to have prebiotic properties by acidifying bowel contents and increasing gut microflora.

Acacia senegal fiber (gum arabic - completely soluble, fully fermentable) has also been shown to have a prebiotic effect in the gut, significantly increasing Bifidobacteria and Lactobacilli after 4 weeks of consumption. Acacia ferments very slowly in the gut, and due to its polymeric nature does not disturb osmotic pressure, so it has a good gastrointestinal tolerance (it has no sudden and painful release of gas, and the total gas production is much lower than with fructooligosaccharide, for instance) and does not present any side effects at dosages up to 50 grams per day. Particularly helpful for IBS is that Acacia senegal behaves as a regulator; it is able to reduce diarrhea and reduce constipation.

Dietary insoluble fiber has long been shown to exacerbate Irritable Bowel Syndrome symptoms.

=== Weight management ===
It has been suggested that the refining of fibre-rich grains has contributed to the obesity epidemic of Western countries. Whole, dietary forms of fibre are more difficult to ingest and absorb than milled and refined food products. This is because dietary fibre may be able to displace available calories and nutrients, requires more time for chewing (thereby slowing intake rate and inducing satiety), and reduces the efficiency of absorption in the small intestine.

Supplemental forms of fibre have been shown to potentially assist weight management by increasing satiety, decreasing the absorption rate of starches and sugars, and binding to lipids in the small intestine thereby reducing serum triglycerides and chylomicron.

Powdered guar gum, a soluble fibre, was shown to be associated with a significantly lower energy intake in obese subjects who ingested a non-restricted diet over one week, when the same participants did not consume the fibre supplement.

A similar reduction of energy intake through fibre supplementation was observed in another study. A dose of guar gum was administered to normal-weight and obese participants. A 10% reduction of energy was observed in the normal subjects, and a 30% reduction of energy for obese subjects. Fibre supplementation has also been indicated to assist compliance to low-calorie diets, as indicated through decreased feelings of hunger and increased ratings of satiety. Other soluble fiber forms such as glucomannan have also been studied in relationship to blood sugar and fat digestion in obese patients.

== Side effects ==
Abruptly adding elevated amounts of fibre to the diet too quickly can lead to intestinal gas, diarrhea, abdominal bloating, cramping, and constipation. It is therefore better to regulate and moderate daily fibre intake. If increased fibre intake is desired, gradually increasing the amount over a few days allows the natural bacteria in the gastrointestinal tract to adjust to the change. Drinking 1- 2 L of water every day can prevent some uncomfortable symptoms by making the stool soft and bulky.

The risk of intestinal obstruction from insoluble fiber in susceptible individuals, fluid imbalance leading to dehydration and mineral deficiencies may increase if more than 50 g of fibre is ingested per day. For this reason, individuals who decide to suddenly double or triple their fibre intake are often advised to double or triple their water intake. In addition, excessive intake of non-fermentable fibre (typically in supplemental form) may lead to mineral deficiencies by reducing the absorption or increasing the excretion of minerals, especially when mineral intake is too low or when mineral needs are increased such as during pregnancy, lactation, or adolescence.

Excessive fibre intake can also contribute to nutrient and drug interactions. For example, antidepressant medications, diabetes medications, carbamazepine, cholesterol-lowering medications and penicillin. According to figures from Public Health England (PHE), most Britons are not getting enough fiber from their diets. Findings from the latest National Diet and Nutrition Survey reveal that the average Briton consumes 18g of fiber each day; however, this is significantly below the recommended intake of 30g.

== Common main ingredients ==
Most supplementary dietary fiber ingredients are produced from plants.

Insoluble:

- Cellulose, some hemicellulose
- Lignin
- Some pectins

Soluble:

- Psyllium (a type of mucilage)
- Inulin oligofructose (degraded inulin produces fructooligosaccharide or FOS) - derived from onions, beets, chicory root (also a sugar substitute)
- Beta-glucan (a type of mucilage and natural gum)
- Other natural gums
- Pectin
- Polydextrose (synthesized; also a sugar substitute)
- Resistant starch
- Wheat dextrin

== Common supplement brands ==
Product Name	Solubility	Ingredients	Capsule or powder
Benefiber	Soluble	Natural, manufacturing by-product – wheat dextrin (USA), inulin (Canada)	Capsule, powder
Citrucel	Soluble	Synthetic – methylcellulose	Capsule, powder
FenFiber	Soluble	Natural, whole food – fenugreek	Capsule
FibreSmart	Soluble, insoluble	Natural, whole food – flax	Capsule, powder
FiberCon	Insoluble	Synthetic – calcium polycarbophil	Capsule
Fiber Choice	Soluble	Natural, manufacturing by-product – inulin	Capsule
Heather's Tummy Fiber	Soluble	Natural, whole food – organic acacia senegal	Powder
Metamucil	Soluble, insoluble	Natural, whole food – psyllium	Capsule, powder
Fiberlyze	Soluble, insoluble	Natural, whole food – psyllium, corn fiber	Powder
Natural Brand psyllium seed husk	Soluble, insoluble	Natural, whole food – psyllium	Capsule
PGX	Soluble	Natural, manufacturing by-product – glucomannan	Capsule
ReCleanse Fibre Powder	Soluble, insoluble	Natural, manufacturing by-product and whole food – inulin/flax	Powder
ReguFIT	Soluble, insoluble	Flax seed, wheat bran, pineapple, oat bran, senna leaves, psyllium husks, stevia, omega 3-6	Powder
