= Metamucil =

Fibre supplement introduced in 1934

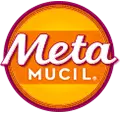
- Industry: Over-the-counter medicines
- Founded: 1934; 92 years ago
- Parent: Procter & Gamble
- Website: www.metamucil.com

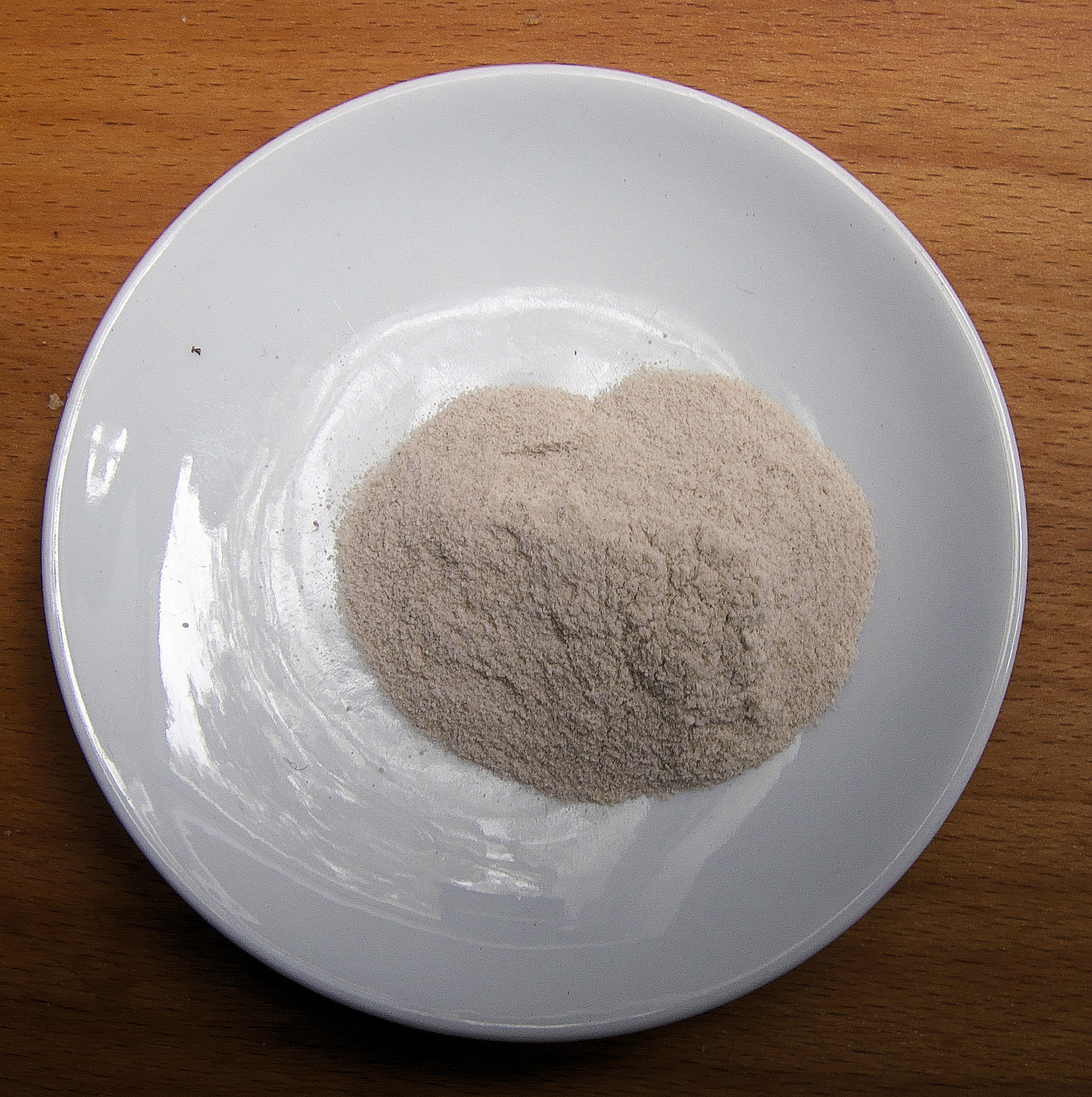
Metamucil Psyllium powder

Metamucil is a fiber supplement. Introduced in 1934 by G. D. Searle & Company (now G.D. Searle, LLC), Metamucil was acquired by Procter & Gamble in 1985. It is named after the class of fiber that it utilizes (mucilage). In its early years, Metamucil achieved sporadic drug-store distribution as a "behind the counter" brand. Since 1974, the brand was also marketed to consumers by print and TV advertising and became available in food outlets. Flavored versions were added in 1979.

== Products ==
The brand is sold as powdered drink mixes, capsules and wafers in a variety of flavors. Metamucil contains psyllium seed husks as the active ingredient. It is manufactured in Phoenix, Arizona by Procter & Gamble. When first marketed to consumers in 1974, Metamucil was marketed as a laxative. The advertising slogan at that time was "If not nature, then Metamucil". Procter & Gamble sought to make Metamucil a household name by advertising in magazines and on television, using the claim "All fiber is not created equal". The target group was older people who are more likely to suffer from constipation.

On October 4, 2013, Procter & Gamble partnered with Tony Danza to organize the “Do More Than You Think” contest to promote and fund health and wellness charities. The main prize was the chance to select the charity that would receive a $100,000 donation from Procter & Gamble.
