= Horse colic =

Clinical symptom

Colic in horses is defined as abdominal pain, but it is a clinical symptom rather than a diagnosis. The term colic can encompass all forms of gastrointestinal conditions which cause pain as well as other causes of abdominal pain not involving the gastrointestinal tract. What makes it tricky is that different causes can manifest with similar signs of distress in the animal. Recognizing and understanding these signs is pivotal, as timely action can spell the difference between a brief moment of discomfort and a life-threatening situation.

The most common forms of colic are gastrointestinal in nature and are most often related to colonic disturbance. There are a variety of different causes of colic, some of which can prove fatal without surgical intervention. Colic surgery is usually a very expensive procedure as it is major abdominal surgery, often with intensive aftercare. Among domesticated horses, colic is the leading cause of premature death. The incidence of colic in the general horse population has been estimated between 4 and 10 percent over the course of the average lifespan. Clinical signs of colic generally require veterinary evaluation and treatment. The conditions that cause colic can become life-threatening in a short period of time.

== Pathophysiology ==
Colic can be divided broadly into several categories:

1. excessive gas accumulation in the intestine (gas colic)
2. simple obstruction
3. strangulating obstruction
4. non-strangulating infarction
5. inflammation of the gastrointestinal tract (enteritis, colitis) or the peritoneum (peritonitis)
6. ulceration of the gastrointestinal mucosa

These categories can be further differentiated based on location of the lesion and underlying cause (See Types of colic).

=== Simple obstruction ===
This is characterised by a physical obstruction of the intestine, which can be due to impacted food material, stricture formation, or foreign bodies. The primary pathophysiological abnormality caused by this obstruction is related to the trapping of fluid within the intestine oral to the obstruction. This is due to the large amount of fluid produced in the upper gastrointestinal tract, and the fact that this is primarily re-absorbed in parts of the intestine downstream from the obstruction. The first problem with this degree of fluid loss from circulation is one of decreased plasma volume, leading to reduced cardiac output, and acid-base disturbances.

The intestine becomes distended due to the trapped fluid and gas production from bacteria. It is this distension, and subsequent activation of stretch receptors within the intestinal wall, that leads to the associated pain. With progressive distension of the intestinal wall, there is occlusion of blood vessels, firstly the less rigid veins, then arteries. This impairment of blood supply leads to hyperemia and congestion, and ultimately to ischaemic necrosis and cellular death. The poor blood supply also has effects on the vascular endothelium, leading to an increased permeability which first leaks plasma and eventually blood into the intestinal lumen. In the opposite fashion, gram-negative bacteria and endotoxins can enter the bloodstream, leading to further systemic effects.

=== Strangulating obstruction ===
Strangulating obstructions have all the same pathological features as a simple obstruction, but the blood supply is immediately affected. Both arteries and veins may be affected immediately, or progressively as in simple obstruction. By far the most common strangulating obstruction in horses is from a pedunculated lipoma. Other causes of strangulating obstruction are intussusceptions, torsion or volvulus, and displacement of intestine through a hole, such as a hernia, a mesenteric rent, or the epiploic foramen.

=== Non-strangulating infarction ===
In a non-strangulating infarction, blood supply to a section of intestine is occluded, without any obstruction to ingesta present within the intestinal lumen. The most common cause is infection with Strongylus vulgaris larvae, which primarily develop within the cranial mesenteric artery.

=== Inflammation or ulceration of the gastrointestinal tract ===
Inflammation along any portion of the GI tract can lead to colic. This leads to pain and possibly stasis of peristalsis (Ileus), which can cause excessive accumulation of fluid in the gastrointestinal tract. This is a functional rather than mechanical blockage of the intestine, but like the mechanical blockage seen with simple obstructions, it can have serious effects including severe dehydration. Inflammation of the bowel may lead to increased permeability and subsequent endotoxemia. The underlying cause of inflammation may be due to infection, toxin, or trauma, and may require special treatment in order to resolve the colic.

Ulceration of the mucosal surface occurs very commonly in the stomach (gastric ulceration), due to damage from stomach acid or alteration in protective mechanisms of the stomach, and is usually not life-threatening. The right dorsal colon may also develop ulceration, usually secondary to excessive NSAID use, which alters the homeostatic balance of prostaglandins that protect the mucosa.

== Types ==
This list of types of colic is not exhaustive but details some of the types which may be encountered.

=== Gas and spasmodic colic ===
Gas colic, also known as tympanic colic, is the result of gas buildup within the horse's digestive tract due to excessive fermentation within the intestines or a decreased ability to move gas through it. It is usually the result of a change in diet, but can also occur due to low dietary roughage levels, parasites (22% of spasmodic colics are associated with tapeworms), and anthelminthic administration. This gas buildup causes distention and increases pressure in the intestines, causing pain. Additionally, it usually causes an increase in peristaltic waves, which can lead to painful spasms of the intestine, producing subsequent spasmodic colic. The clinical signs of these forms of colic are generally mild, transient, and respond well to spasmolytic medications, such as buscopan, and analgesics. Gas colics usually self-correct, but there is the risk of subsequent torsion (volvulus) or displacement of the bowel due to gas distention, which causes this affected piece of bowel to rise upward in the abdomen.

Abdominal distention may occasionally be seen in adult horses in the flank region, if the cecum or large colon is affected. Foals, however, may show signs of gas within the small intestines with severe abdominal distention.

=== Impaction ===
==== Pelvic flexure impaction ====
This is caused by an impaction of food material (water, grass, hay, grain) at a part of the large bowel known as the pelvic flexure of the left colon where the intestine takes a 180 degree turn and narrows. Impaction generally responds well to medical treatment, usually requiring a few days of fluids and laxatives such as mineral oil, but more severe cases may not recover without surgery. If left untreated, severe impaction colic can be fatal. The most common cause is when the horse is on box rest and/or consumes large volumes of concentrated feed, or the horse has dental disease and is unable to masticate properly. This condition could be diagnosed on rectal examination by a veterinarian. Impactions are often associated with the winter months because horses do not drink as much water and eat drier material (hay instead of grass), producing drier intestinal contents that are more likely to get stuck.

==== Ileal impaction and ileal hypertrophy ====
The ileum is the last part of the small intestine that ends in the cecum. Ileal impaction can be caused by obstruction of ingesta. Coastal Bermuda hay is associated with impactions in this most distal segment of the small intestine, although it is difficult to separate this risk factor from geographic location, since the southeastern United States has a higher prevalence of ileal impaction and also has regional access to coastal Bermuda hay. Other causes can be obstruction by ascarids (Parascaris equorum), usually occurring at 3–5 months of age right after deworming, and tapeworms (Anoplocephala perfoliata), which have been associated with up to 81% of ileal impactions (See Ascarids). Horses show intermittent colic, with moderate to severe signs and with time, distended small intestinal loops on rectal. Although most ileal impactions will sometimes pass without intervention, those present for 8–12 hours will cause fluid to back up, leading to gastric reflux, which is seen in approximately 50% of horses that require surgical intervention. Diagnosis is usually made based on clinical signs, presence of reflux, rectal exam, and ultrasound. Often the impaction can not be felt on rectal due to distended small intestinal loops that block the examiner. Those impactions that are unresponsive to medical management, which includes IV fluids and removal of reflux, may be treated using a single injection into the ileum with 1 liter of carboxymethylcellulose, and then massaging the ileum. This allows the impaction to be treated without actually cutting into the ileum. Prognosis for survival is good.

Ileal hypertrophy occurs when the circular and longitudinal layers of the ileal intestinal wall hypertrophy, and can also occur with jejunal hypertrophy. The mucosa remains normal, so malabsorption is not expected to occur in this disease. Ileal hypertrophy may be idiopathic, with current theories for such cases including neural dysfunction within the intestinal wall secondary to parasite migration, and increased tone of the ileocecal valve which leads to hypertrophy of the ileum as it tries to push contents into the cecum. Hypertrophy may also occur secondary to obstruction, especially those that have had surgery for an obstruction that required an anastomosis. Hypertrophy gradually decreases the size of the lumen, resulting in intermittent colic, and in approximately 45% of cases includes weight loss of 1–6 month duration and anorexia. Although rectal examination may display a thickened ileal wall, usually the diagnosis is made at surgery, and an ileocecal or jejunocecal anastomosis is made to allow intestinal contents to bypass the affected area. If surgery and bypass is not performed, there is a risk of rupture, but prognosis is fair with surgical treatment.

==== Sand impaction ====
This is most likely to occur in horses that graze sandy or heavily grazed pastures leaving only dirt to ingest. Foals, weanlings, and yearlings are most likely to ingest sand, and are therefore most commonly seen with sand colic. The term sand also encompasses dirt. The ingested sand or dirt most commonly accumulates in the pelvic flexure, but may also occur in the right dorsal colon and the cecum of the large intestines. The sand can cause colic signs similar to other impactions of the large colon, and often causes abdominal distention. As the sand or dirt irritates the lining of the bowel it can cause diarrhea. The weight and abrasion of the sand or dirt causes the bowel wall to become inflamed and can cause a reduction in colonic motility and, in severe cases, leads to peritonitis.

Diagnosis is usually made by history, environmental conditions, auscultation of the ventral abdomen, radiographs, ultrasound, or fecal examination (See Diagnosis). Historically, medical treatment of the problem is with laxatives such as liquid paraffin or oil and psyllium husk. More recently veterinarians treat cases with specific synbiotic (pro and prebiotic) and psyllium combinations. Psyllium is the most effective medical treatment. It works by binding to the sand to help remove it, although multiple treatments may be required. Mineral oil is mostly ineffective since it floats on the surface of the impaction, rather than penetrating it. Horses with sand or dirt impaction are predisposed to Salmonella infection and other GI bacteria, so antibiotics are often added to help prevent infection. Medical management usually resolves the colic, but if improvement does not occur within a few hours then surgery must be performed to flush the colon of any sand, which procedure that has a 60–65% survival rate. Horses that are not treated, or treated too late after the onset of clinical signs, are at risk of death.

Horses should not be fed directly on the ground in areas where sand, dirt and silt are prevalent, although small amounts of sand or dirt may still be ingested by grazing. Management to reduce sand intake and prophylactic treatments with sand removal products are recommended by most veterinarians. Such prophylaxis includes feeding a pelleted psyllium for one week every 4–5 weeks. Longer duration of treatment will result in gastrointestinal flora changes and the psyllium to be broken down and ineffective for sand clearance. Other methods include feeding the horse before turnout, and turning the horses out in the middle of the day so they are more likely to stand in the shade rather than graze.

==== Cecal impaction ====
Only 5% of large intestinal impactions at referral hospital involve the cecum. Primary cecal impactions usually consist of dry feed material, with the horse slowly developing clinical signs over several days. Secondary cecal impactions may occur post-surgery, orthopedic or otherwise, and the cecum does not function properly. Horses usually show clinical signs 3–5 days post general anesthesia, including decreased appetite, decreased manure production, and gas in the cecum which can be auscultated. The cecum quickly distends due to fluid and gas accumulation, often leading to rupture within 24–48 hours if not corrected. This impaction may be missed since decreased manure production can be attributed secondarily to surgery, and often rupture occurs before severe signs of pain. Horses are most at risk for this type of impaction if surgery is greater than 1 hour in length, or if inadequate analgesia is provided postoperatively.

Diagnosis is usually made by rectal palpation. Treatment includes fluid therapy and analgesics, but surgery is indicated if there is severe distention of the cecum or if medical therapy does not improve the situation. Surgery includes typhlotomy, and although cecal bypass has been performed in the past to prevent reoccurrence, a recent study suggests it is not necessary. Surgery has a good prognosis, although rupture can occur during surgical manipulation. The cause of cecal impactions are not known. Cecal impaction should be differentiated from large colon impaction via rectal, since cecal impaction has a high risk of rupture even before developing severe pain. Overall prognosis is 90%, regardless of medical or surgical treatment, but rupture does occur, often with no warning.

==== Gastric impaction ====
Gastric impactions are relatively rare, and occur when food is not cleared at the appropriate rate. It is most commonly associated with ingestion of foods that swell after eating or feeds that are coarse (bedding or poor quality roughage), poor dental care, poor mastication, inadequate drinking, ingestion of a foreign object, and alterations in the normal function of the stomach. Persimmons, which form a sticky gel in the stomach, and haylage, have both been associated with it, as has wheat, barley, mesquite beans, and beet pulp. Horses usually show signs of mild colic that is chronic, unresponsive to analgesics, and may include signs such as dysphagia, ptyalism, bruxism, fever, and lethargy, although severe colic signs may occur. Signs of shock may be seen if gastric rupture has occurred. Usually, the impaction must be quite large before it presents symptoms, and may be diagnosed via gastroscopy or ultrasound, although rectal examinations are unhelpful. Persimmon impaction is treated with infusions of Coca-Cola. Other gastric impactions are often resolves with enteral fluids. Quick treatment generally produces a favorable prognosis.

==== Small colon impaction ====
Small colon impactions represent a small number of colics in the horse, and are usually caused by obstruction from fecaliths, enteroliths, and meconium. Horses usually present with standard colic signs (pawing, flank watching, rolling) in 82% of horses, and occasionally with diarrhea (31%), anorexia (30%), straining (12%), and depression (11%), and rectal examination will reveal firm loops of small colon or actually palpable obstruction in the rectum. Impactions are most common in miniature horses, possibly because they do not masticate their feed as well, and during the fall and winter. Medical management includes the aggressive use of fluids, laxatives and lubricants, and enemas, as well as analgesics and anti-inflammatories. However, these impactions often require surgical intervention, and the surgeon will empty the colon either by enterotomy or by lubricants and massage. Surgical intervention usually results in longer recovery time at the hospital. Prognosis is very good, and horses treated with surgical treatment had a survival with return to athletic function rate of 91%, while 89% of the medically managed horses returned to previous use.

==== Large colon impaction ====
Large colon impactions typically occur at the pelvic flexure and right dorsal colon, two areas where the lumen of the intestine narrows. Large colon impactions are most frequently seen in horses that have recently had a sudden decrease in exercise, such as after a musculoskeletal injury. They are also associated in the practice of twice daily feeding of grain meals, which causes a short-lived but significant secretion of fluid into the lumen of the intestine, resulting in a 15% decrease in plasma volume (hypovolemia of the circulatory system) and the subsequent activation of the renin–angiotensin–aldosterone system. Aldosterone secretion activates absorption of fluid from the colon, decreasing the water content of the ingesta and increasing risk of impaction. Amitraz has also been associated with large colon impaction, due to alterations in motility and retention of intestinal contents, which causes further absorption of water and dehydration of ingesta. Other possible factors include poor dental care, course roughage, dehydration, and limited exercise.

Horses with a large colon impaction usually have mild signs that slowly get worse if the impaction does not resolve, and can produce severe signs. Diagnosis is often made by rectal palpation of the mass, although this is not always accurate since a portion of the colon is not palpable on rectal. Additional sections of intestines may be distended if there is fluid backup. Manure production decreases, and if passed, is usually firm, dry and mucus covered. Horses are treated with analgesics, fluid therapy, mineral oil, dactyl sodium sulfosuccinate (DSS), and/or epsom salts. Analgesics usually can control the abdominal discomfort, but may become less efficacious over time if the impaction does not resolve. Persistent impactions may require fluids administered both intravenously and orally via nasogastric tube, at a rate 2–4 times the maintenance for the animal. Feed is withheld. Horses that do not improve or become very painful, or those that have large amounts of gas distention, are recommended to undergo surgery to remove the impaction via enterotomy of the pelvic flexure. Approximately 95% of horses that undergo medical management, and 58% of surgical cases, survive.

==== Enteroliths and fecaliths ====
Enteroliths in horses are 'stones' of mineral deposits, usually of ammonium magnesium phosphate (struvite) but sometimes of magnesium vivianite and some amounts of sodium, potassium, sulfur and calcium, which develop within the horse's gastrointestinal tract. They can form around a piece of ingested foreign material, such as a small nidus of wire or sand (similar to how an oyster forms a pearl). When they move from their original site they can obstruct the intestine, usually in the right dorsal and transverse colon, but rarely in the small colon. They may also cause mucosal irritation or pain when they move within the gastrointestinal tract. Enteroliths are not a common cause of colic, but are known to have a higher prevalence in states with a sandy soil or an abundance of alfalfa hay is fed, such as California, a state where 28% of surgical colics are due to enteroliths. Alfalfa hay is thought to increase the risk due to the high protein content in the hay, which would likely elevate ammonia nitrogen levels within the intestine. They may be more common in horses with diets high in magnesium, and are also seen more often in Arabians, Morgans, American Saddlebreds, miniature horses, and donkeys, and usually occur in horses older than four years of age. Horses with enteroliths typically have chronic, low-grade, recurring colic signs, which may lead to acute colic and distention of the large colon after occlusion of the lumen occurs. These horse may also have had a history of passing enteroliths in their manure. Level of pain is related to the degree of luminal occlusion. Abdominal radiographs can confirm the diagnosis, but smaller enteroliths may not be visible. In rare instances, enteroliths may be palpated on rectal examination, usually if they are present in the small colon. Once a horse is diagnosed with colic due to an enterolith, surgery is necessary to remove it, usually by pelvic flexure enterotomy and sometimes an additional right dorsal colon enterotomy, and fully resolve the signs of colic. Horses will usually present a round enterolith if it is the only one present, while multiple enteroliths will usually have flat sides, a clue to the surgeon to look for more stones. The main risk of surgery is rupture of the colon (15% of cases), and 92% of horses that are recovered survive to at least one year from their surgery date.

Fecaliths are hard formations of ingesta, often containing mane and/or tail hair that obstruct the GI tract, and may require surgery to resolve. These are most commonly seen in miniature horses, ponies, and foals.

=== Displacement ===
A displacement occurs when a portion of the large colon—usually the pelvic flexure—moves to an abnormal location. There are four main displacements described in equine medicine:

1. Left dorsal displacement: the pelvic flexure moves dorsally between the left bodywall and the spleen. If the colon continues far enough dorsally, it can become lodged in the nephrosplenic space (nephrosplenic entrapment). This space is found between the spleen and left kidney, which are connected by the nephrosplenic ligament. LDD accounts for 6–8% of all colics.
2. Right dorsal displacement: the colon moves between the cecum and body wall.
3. The pelvic flexure retroflexes towards the diaphragm
4. The colon develops a volvulus of 90 to 180 degrees, minimally occluding the vasculature of the organ.

The cause of displacement is not definitively known, but one explanation is that the bowel becomes abnormally distended with gas (from excessive fermentation of grain, a change in the microbiota secondary to antibiotic use, or a buildup of gas secondary to impaction) which results in a shift in the bowel to an abnormal position. Because much of the bowel is not anchored to the body wall, it is free to move out of position. Displacement is usually diagnosed using a combination of findings from the rectal exam and ultrasonography.

Many displacements (~96% of LDD, 64% of RDD) resolve with medical management that includes fluids (oral or intravenous) to rehydrate the horse and soften any impaction that may be present. Systemic analgesics, antispasmodics, and sedation are often used to keep the horse comfortable during this time. Horses with left dorsal displacement are sometimes treated with exercise and/or phenylephrine—a medication that causes contracture of the spleen and may allow the bowel to slip off the nephrosplenic ligament. At times anesthesia and a rolling procedure, in which the horse is placed in left lateral recumbency and rolled to right lateral recumbency while jostling, can also be used to try to shift the colon off of the nephrosplenic ligament. Displacements that do not respond to medical therapy require surgery, which generally has a very high success rate (80–95%).

Reoccurrence can occur with all types of displacements: 42% of horses with RDD, 46% of horses with retroflexion, 21% of those with volvulus, and 8% of those with LDD had reoccurrence of colic. Recurrence of nephrosplenic entrapment may be prevented by closing the nephrosplenic space with sutures, although this does not prevent other types of displacements from occurring in that same horse.

=== Torsion and volvulus ===
A volvulus is a twist along the axis of the mesentery, a torsion is a twist along the longitudinal axis of the intestine. Various parts of the horse's gastrointestinal tract may twist upon themselves. It is most likely to be either small intestine or part of the colon. Occlusion of the blood supply means that it is a painful condition causing rapid deterioration and requiring emergency surgery.

Volvulus of the large colon usually occurs where the mesentery attaches to the body wall, but may also occur at the diaphragmatic or sternal flexures, with rotations up to 720 degrees reported. It is most commonly seen in postpartum mares, usually presents with severe signs of colic that are refractory to analgesic administration, and horses often lie in dorsal recumbency. Abdominal distention is common due to strangulation and rapid engorgement of the intestine with gas, which then can lead to dyspnea as the growing bowel pushes against the diaphragm and prevents normal ventilation. Additionally, compression can place pressure on the caudal vena cava, leading to pooling of blood and hypovolemia. However, horses may not have a high heart rate, presumably due to increased vagal tone. Rectal palpation will demonstrate a severely gas distended colon, and the examiner may not be able to push beyond the brim of the pelvis due to the obstruction. The colon may be irreversibly damaged in as little as 3–4 hours from the initial time of the volvulus, so immediate surgical correction is required. The surgeon works to correct the volvulus and then removes any damaged colon. 95% of the colon may be resected, but often the volvulus damages more than this amount, requiring euthanasia. Plasma lactate levels can help predict survival rates, with an increased survival seen in horses with a lactate below 6.0 mmol/L. Prognosis is usually poor, with a survival rate of approximately 36% of horses with a 360 degree volvulus, and 74% of those with a 270 degree volvulus, and a reoccurrence rate of 5–50%. Complications post-surgery include hypoproteinemia, endotoxic shock, laminitis, and DIC.

Small intestinal volvulus is thought to be caused by a change in local peristalsis, or due to a lesion that the mesentery may twist around (such as an ascarid impaction), and usually involves the distal jejunum and ileum.w It is one of the most common causes of small intestinal obstruction in foals, possibly because of a sudden change to a bulkier foodstuff. Animals present with acute and severe signs of colic, and multiple distended loops of small intestine, usually seen radiographically in a foal. Small intestinal volvulus often occurs secondary to another disease process in adult horses, where small intestinal obstruction causes distention and then rotation around the root of the mesentery. Surgery is required to resect nonviable sections of bowel, and prognosis is correlated to the length of bowel involved, with animals with greater than 50% of small intestinal involvement having a grave prognosis.

=== Intussusception ===
Intussusception is a form of colic in which a piece of intestine "telescopes" within a portion of itself because a section is paralyzed, so the motile section pushes itself into the non-motile section. It most commonly occurs at the ileocecal junction and requires urgent surgery. It is almost always associated with parasitic infections, usually tapeworms, although small masses and foreign bodies may also be responsible, and is most common in young horses usually around 1 year of age. Ileocecal intussusception may be acute, involving longer (6–457 cm) segments of bowel, or chronic involving shorter sections (up to 10 cm in length). Horses with the acute form of colic usually have a duration of colic less than 24 hours long, while chronic cases have mild but intermittent colic. Horses with the chronic form tend to have better prognosis.

Rectal examination reveals a mass at the base of the cecum in 50% of cases. Ultrasound reveals a very characteristic "target" pattern on cross-section. Abdominocentesis results can vary, since the strangulated bowel is trapped within the healthy bowel, but there are usually signs of obstruction, including reflux and multiple loops of distended small intestine felt on rectal. Surgery is required for intussusception. Reduction of the area is usually ineffective due to swelling, so jejunojejunal intussusceptions are resected and ileocolic intussusceptions are resected as far distally as possible and a jejunocecal anatomosis is performed.

=== Entrapment ===
==== Epiploic foramen entrapment ====
On rare occasions, a piece of small intestine (or rarely colon) can become trapped through the epiploic foramen into the omental bursa. The blood supply to this piece of intestine is immediately occluded and surgery is the only available treatment. This type of colic has been associated with cribbers, possibly due to changes in abdominal pressure, and in older horses, possibly because the foramen enlarges as the right lobe of the liver atrophies with age, although it has been seen in horses as young as four months old. Horses usually present with colic signs referable to small intestinal obstruction. During surgery, the foramen can not be enlarged due to the risk of rupture of the vena cava or portal vein, which would result in fatal hemorrhage. Survival is 74–79%, and survival is consistently correlated with abdominocentesis findings prior to surgery.

==== Mesenteric rent entrapment ====
The mesentery is a thin sheet attached to the entire length of intestine, enclosing blood vessels, lymph nodes, and nerves. Occasionally, a small rent (hole) can form in the mesentery, through which a segment of bowel can occasionally enter. As in epiploic foramen entrapment, the bowel first enlarges, since arteries do not occlude as easily as veins, which causes edema (fluid buildup). As the bowel enlarges, it becomes less and less likely to be able to exit the site of entrapment. Colic signs are referable to those seen with a strangulating lesion, such as moderate to severe abdominal pain, endotoxemia, decrease gut sounds, distended small intestine on rectal, and nasogastric reflux. This problem requires surgical correction. Survival for mesenteric rent entrapment is usually lower than other small intestinal strangulating lesions, possibly due to hemorrhage, difficulty correcting the entrapment, and the length of intestine commonly involved, with <50% of cases surviving until discharge.

=== Inflammatory and ulcerative conditions ===
==== Proximal enteritis ====
Proximal enteritis, also known as anterior enteritis or duodenitis-proximal jejunitis (DPJ), is inflammation of the duodenum and upper jejunum. It is potentially caused by infectious organisms, such as Salmonella and Clostridial species, but other possible contributing factors include Fusarium infection or high concentrate diets. The inflammation of the intestine leads to large secretions of electrolytes and fluid into its lumen, and thus large amounts of gastric reflux, leading to dehydration and occasionally shock.

Signs include acute onset of moderate to severe pain, large volumes orange-brown and fetid gastric reflux, distended small intestine on rectal examination, fever, depression, increased heart rate and respiratory rate, prolonged CRT, and darkened mucous membranes. Pain level usually improves after gastric decompression. It is important to differentiate DPI from small intestinal obstruction, since obstruction may require surgical intervention. This can be difficult, and often requires a combination of clinical signs, results from the physical examination, laboratory data, and ultrasound to help suggest one diagnosis over the other, but a definitive diagnosis can only be made with surgery or on necropsy.

DPI usually is managed medically with nasogastric intubation every 1–2 hours to relieve gastric pressure secondary to reflux, and aggressive fluid support to maintain hydration and correct electrolyte imbalances. Horses are often withheld food for several days. Use of anti-inflammatory, anti-endotoxin, anti-microbial, and prokinetic drugs are common with this disease. Surgery may be needed to rule out obstruction or strangulation, and in cases that are long-standing to perform a resection and anastomosis of the diseased bowel. Survival rates for DPJ are 25–94%, and horses in the southeast United States appear to be more severely affected.

==== Colitis ====
Colitis is inflammation of the colon. Acute cases are medical emergencies as the horse rapidly loses fluid, protein, and electrolytes into the gut, leading to severe dehydration which can result in hypovolemic shock and death. Horses generally present with signs of colic before developing profuse, watery, fetid diarrhea.

Both infectious and non-infectious causes for colitis exist. In the adult horse, Salmonella, Clostridioides difficile, and Neorickettsia risticii (the causative agent of Potomac Horse Fever) are common causes of colitis. Antibiotics, which may lead to an altered and unhealthy microbiota, sand, grain overload, and toxins such as arsenic and cantharidin can also lead to colitis. Unfortunately, only 20–30% of acute colitis cases are able to be definitively diagnosed. NSAIDs can cause slower-onset of colitis, usually in the right dorsal colon (see Right dorsal colitis).

Treatment involves administration of large volumes of intravenous fluids, which can become very costly. Antibiotics are often given if deemed appropriate based on the presumed underlying cause and the horse's CBC results. Therapy to help prevent endotoxemia and improve blood protein levels (plasma or synthetic colloid administration) may also be used if budgetary constraints allow. Other therapies include probiotics and anti-inflammatory medication. Horses that are not eating well may also require parenteral nutrition. Horses usually require 3–6 days of treatment before clinical signs improve.

Due to the risk of endotoxemia, laminitis is a potential complication for horses suffering from colitis, and may become the primary cause for euthanasia. Horses are also at increased risk of thrombophlebitis.

==== Gastric ulceration ====
Horses form ulcers in the stomach fairly commonly, a disease called equine gastric ulcer syndrome. Risk factors include confinement, infrequent feedings, a high proportion of concentrate feeds, such as grains, excessive non-steroidal anti-inflammatory drug use, and the stress of shipping and showing. Gastric ulceration has also been associated with the consumption of cantharidin beetles in alfalfa hay which are very caustic when chewed and ingested. Most ulcers are treatable with medications that inhibit the acid producing cells of the stomach. Antacids are less effective in horses than in humans, because horses produce stomach acid almost constantly, while humans produce acid mainly when eating. Dietary management is critical. Bleeding ulcers leading to stomach rupture are rare.

==== Right dorsal colitis ====
Long-term use of NSAIDs can lead to mucosal damage of the colon, secondary to decreased levels of homeostatic prostaglandins. Mucosal injury is usually limited to the right dorsal colon, but can be more generalized. Horses may display acute or chronic intermittent colic, peripheral edema secondary to protein losing enteropathy, decreased appetite, and diarrhea. Treatment involves decreasing the fiber levels of the horse's diet by reducing grass and hay, and placing the horse on an easily digestible pelleted feed until the colon can heal. Additionally, the horse may be given misoprostol, sucralfate, and psyllium to try to improve mucosal healing, as well as metronidazole to reduce inflammation of the colon.

=== Tumors ===
==== Strangulating pedunculated lipoma ====
Benign fatty tumors known as lipomas can form on the mesentery. As the tumor enlarges, it stretches the connective tissue into a stalk which can wrap around a segment of bowel, typically small intestine, cutting off its blood supply. The tumor forms a button that latches onto the stalk of the tumor, locking it on place, and requiring surgery for resolution. Surgery involves cutting the stalk of the tumor, untwisting the bowel, and removing bowel that is no longer viable. If the colic is identified and taken to surgery quickly, there is a reasonable rate of success of 50–78%. This type of colic is most commonly associated with ponies, and aged geldings, 10 years and older, probably because of fat distribution in this group of animals.

==== Other cancers ====
Cancers (neoplasia) other than lipoma are relatively rare causes of colic. Cases have been reported with intestinal cancers including intestinal lymphosarcoma, leiomyoma, and adenocarcinoma, stomach cancers such as squamous cell carcinoma, and splenic lymphosarcoma.

Gastric squamous cell carcinoma is most often found in the non-glandular region of the stomach of horses greater than 5 years of age, and horses often present with weight loss, anorexia, anemia, and ptyalism. Gastric carcinoma is usually diagnosed via gastroscopy, but may sometimes be felt on rectal if they have metastasized to the peritoneal cavity. Additionally, laparoscopy can also diagnose metastasized cancer, as can presence of neoplastic cells on abdominocentesis. Often the signs of intestinal neoplasia are non-specific, and include weight loss and colic, usually only if obstruction of the intestinal lumen occurs.

=== Ileus ===
Ileus is the lack of motility of the intestines, leading to a functional obstruction. It often occurs postoperatively following any type of abdominal surgery, and 10–50% of all cases of surgical colic will develop this complication, including 88% of horses with a strangulating obstructions and 41% of all colics with a large intestinal lesion. The exact cause is unknown, but is suspected to be due to inflammation of the intestine, possibly a result of manipulation by the surgeon, and increased sympathetic tone. It has a high fatality rate of 13–86%.

Ileus diagnosed based on several criteria:

1. Nasogastric reflux: 4 liters or greater in a single intubation, or greater than 2 liters of reflex over more than one intubation
2. A heart rate greater than 40 bpm
3. Signs of colic, which may vary from mild to severe
4. Distended small intestine, based on rectal or abdominal ultrasound findings. On ultrasound, ileus presents as more than 3 loops of distended small intestine, with a lack of peristaltic waves.

This form of colic is usually managed medically. Because there is no motility, intestinal contents back up into the stomach. Therefore, periodic decompression of the stomach though nasogastric intubation is essential to prevent rupture. Horses are monitored closely following abdominal surgery, and a sudden increase in heart rate indicates the need to check for nasogastric reflux, as it is an early indication of postoperative ileus. The horse is placed on intravenous fluids to maintain hydration and electrolyte balance and prevent hypovolemic shock, and rate of fluids is calculated based on daily maintenance requirement plus fluid lose via nasogastric reflux.

Motility is encouraged by the use of prokinetic drugs such as erythromycin, metoclopramide, bethanechol and lidocaine, as well as through vigorous walking, which has also been shown to have a beneficial effect on GI motility. Lidocaine is especially useful, as it not only encourages motility, but also has anti-inflammatory properties and may ameliorate some post-operative pain. Metoclopramide has been shown to reduce reflux and hospital stay, but does has excitatory effects on the central nervous system. Anti-inflammatory drugs are used to decrease inflammation of the GI tract, which is thought to be the underlying cause of the disease, as well as to help control any absorption of LPS in cases of endotoxemia since the substance decreases motility. However, care must be taken when giving these drugs, as NSAIDs have been shown to alter intestinal motility.

Large intestinal ileus is most commonly seen in horses following orthopedic surgery, but its risk is also increased in cases where post-operative pain is not well-controlled, after long surgeries, and possibly following ophthalmologic surgeries. It is characterized by decreased manure output (<3 piles per day), rather than nasogastric reflux, as well as decreased gut sounds, signs of colic, and the occasional impaction of the cecum or large colon. Cecal impactions can be fatal, so care must be taken to monitor the horse for large intestinal ileus after orthopedic surgery, primarily by watching for decreased manure production.

Decreased intestinal motility can also be the result of drugs such as Amitraz, which is used to kill ticks and mites. Xylazine, detomidine, and butorphanol also reduce motility, but will not cause colic if appropriately administered.

=== Parasites ===
==== Ascarids (roundworms) ====
Occasionally there can be an obstruction by large numbers of roundworms. This is most commonly seen in young horses as a result of a very heavy infestation of Parascaris equorum that can subsequently cause a blockage and rupture of the small intestine. Rarely, dead worms will be seen in reflux. Deworming heavily infected horses may cause a severe immune reaction to the dead worms, which can damage the intestinal wall and cause a fatal peritonitis. Veterinarians often treat horses with suspected heavy worm burdens with corticosteroids to reduce the inflammatory response to the dead worms. Blockages of the small intestine, particularly the ileum, can occur with Parascaris equorum and may well require colic surgery to remove them manually. Large roundworm infestations are often the result of a poor deworming program. Horses develop immunity to parascarids between 6 months age and one year and so this condition is rare in adult horses. Prognosis is fair unless the foal experiences hypovolemia and septic shock, with a survival rate of 33%.

==== Tapeworms ====
Tapeworms at the junction of the cecum have been implicated in causing colic. The most common species of tapeworm in the equine is Anoplocephala perfoliata. However, a 2008 study in Canada indicated that there is no connection between tapeworms and colic, contradicting studies performed in the UK.

==== Cyathostomes ====
Acute diarrhea can be caused by cyathostomes or "small Strongylus-type" worms that are encysted as larvae in the bowel wall, particularly if large numbers emerge simultaneously. The disease most frequently occurs in winter time. Pathological changes of the bowel reveal a typical "pepper and salt" color of the large intestines. Animals suffering from cyathostominosis usually have a poor deworming history. There is now a lot of resistance to fenbendazole in the UK.

==== Large strongyles ====
Large strongyle worms, most commonly Strongylus vulgaris, are implicated in colic secondary to non-strangulating infarction of the cranial mesenteric artery supplying the intestines, most likely due to vasospasm. Usually the distal small intestine and the large colon are affected, but any segment supplied by this artery can be compromised. This type of colic has become relatively rare with the advent of modern anthelminthics. Clinical signs vary based on the degree of vascular compromise and the length of intestine that is affected, and include acute and severe colic seen with other forms of strangulating obstruction, so diagnosis is usually made based on anthelminthic administration history although may be definitively diagnosed during surgical exploratoration. Treatment includes typical management of colic signs and endotoxemia, and the administration of aspirin to reduce the risk of thrombosis, but surgery is usually not helpful since lesions are often patchy and may be located in areas not easily resected.

=== Foal colic ===
==== Meconium impactions ====
Meconium, or the first feces produced by the foal, is a hard pelleted substance. It is normally passed within the first 24 hours of the foal's life, but may become impacted in the distal colon or rectum. Meconium impaction is most commonly is seen in foals 1–5 days of age, and is more common in miniature foals and in colts more than fillies (possibly because fillies have a wider pelvis). Foals will stop suckling, strain to defecate (presents as an arched back and lifted tail), and may start showing overt signs of colic such as rolling and getting up and down. In later stages, the abdomen will distend as it continues to fill with gas and feces. Meconium impactions are often diagnosed by clinical signs, but digital examination to feel for impacted meconium, radiographs, and ultrasound may also be used.

Treatment for meconium impaction typically involves the use of enemas, although persistent cases may require mineral oil or IV fluids. It is possible to tell that the meconium has passed when the foal begins to produce a softer, more yellow manure. Although meconium impactions rarely cause perforation, and are usually not life-threatening, foals are at risk of dehydration and may not get adequate levels of IgG due to decreased suckling and not enough ingestion of colostrum. Additionally, the foals will eventually bloat, and will require surgical intervention. Surgery in a foal can be especially risky due to immature immune system and low levels of ingested colostrum.

==== Lethal white syndrome ====
Lethal white syndrome, or ileocolonic aganglionosis, will result in meconium impaction since the foal does not have adequate nerve innervation to the large intestine, in essence, a nonfunctioning colon. Foals that are homozygous for the frame overo gene, often seen in Paint horse heritage, will develop the condition. They present with signs of colic within the first 12 hours after birth, and die within 48 hours due to constipation. This syndrome is not treatable.

==== Congenital abnormalities ====
Atresia coli and atresia ani can also present as meconium impaction. The foal is missing the lumen of its distal colon or anus, respectively, and usually show signs of colic within 12–24 hours. Atresia coli is usually diagnosed with barium contrast studies, in which foals are given barium, and then radiographed to see if and where the barium is trapped. Atresia ani is simply diagnosed with digital examination by a veterinarian. Both situations requires emergency surgery to prevent death, and often still has a poor prognosis for survival with surgical correction.

==== Infectious organisms ====
Clostridial enterocolitis due to infection by Clostridium perfringens is most commonly seen in foals under 3 months of age. Clostridial toxins damage the intestine, leading to dehydration and toxemia. Foals usually present with signs of colic, decreased nursing, abdominal distention, and diarrhea which may contain blood. Diagnosis is made with fecal culture, and while some foals do not require serious intervention, others need IV fluids, antibiotics, and aggressive treatment, and may still die. Other bacterial infections that may lead to enterocolitis include Salmonella, Klebsiella, Rhodococcus equi, and Bacteroides fragilis.

Parasitic infection, especially with threadworms (Strongyloides westeri) and ascarids (Parascaris equorum) can produce signs of colic in foals (See Ascarids). Other conditions that may lead to signs of colic in foals include congenital abnormalities, gastric ulcers (see Gastric ulceration), which may lead to gastric perforation and peritonitis, small intestine volvulus, and uroabdomen secondary to urinary bladder rupture.

=== Herniation ===
==== Inguinal herniation ====
Inguinal hernias are most commonly seen in Standardbred and Tennessee Walking Horse stallions due, likely due to a breed prevalence of a large inguinal ring, as well as Saddlebred and Warmblood breeds. Inguinal hernias in adult horses are usually strangulating (unlike foals, which are usually non-strangulating). Stallions usually display acute signs of colic, and a cool, enlarged testicle on one side. Hernias are classified as either indirect, in which the bowel remains in the parietal vaginal tunic, or direct, in which case it ruptures through the tunic and goes subcutaneously. Direct hernias are seen most commonly in foals, and usually congenital. Indirect hernias may be treated by repeated manual reduction, but direct hernias often require surgery to correct. The testicle on the side of resection will often require removal due to vascular compromise, although prognosis for survival is good (75%) and the horse may be used for breeding in the future.

==== Umbilical herniation ====
Although umbilical hernias are common in foals, strangulation is rare, occurring only 4% of the time and usually involving the small intestine. Rarely, the hernia will only involve part of the intestinal wall (termed a Richter's hernia), which can lead to an enterocutaneous fistula. Strangulating umbilical hernias will present as enlarged, firm, warm, and painful with colic signs. Foals usually survive to discharge.

==== Diaphragmatic herniation ====
Diaphragmatic hernias are rare in horses, accounting for 0.3% of colics. Usually the small intestine herniates through a rent in the diaphragm, although any part of the bowel may be involved. Hernias are most commonly acquired, not congenital, with 48% of horses having a history of recent trauma, usually through during parturition, distention of the abdomen, a fall, or strenuous exercise, or direct trauma to the chest. Congenital hernias occur most commonly in the most ventral part of the diaphragm, while acquired hernias are usually seen at the junction of the muscular and tendinous sections of the diaphragm. Clinical signs usually are similar to an obstruction, but occasionally decreased lung sounds may be heard in one section of the chest, although dyspnea is only seen in approximately 18% of horses. Ultrasound and radiography may both be used to diagnose diaphragmatic herniation.

=== Toxins ===
Ingested toxins are rarely a cause of colic in the horse. Toxins that can produce colic signs include organophosphates, monensin, and cantharidin. Additionally, overuse of certain drugs such as NSAIDs may lead to colic signs (See Gastric ulceration and Right dorsal colitis).

=== Uterine tears and torsions ===
Uterine tears often occur a few days post parturition. They can lead to peritonitis and require surgical intervention to fix. Uterine torsions can occur in the third trimester, and while some cases may be corrected if the horse in anesthetized and rolled, others require surgical correction.

=== Other causes that may show clinical signs of colic ===
Strictly speaking, colic refers only to signs originating from the gastrointestinal tract of the horse. Signs of colic may be caused by problems other than the GI-tract e.g. problems in the liver, ovaries, spleen, urogenital system, testicular torsion, pleuritis, and pleuropneumonia. Diseases which sometimes cause symptoms which appear similar to colic include uterine contractions, laminitis, and exertional rhabdomyolysis. Colic pain secondary to kidney disease is rare.

== Diagnosis ==
Many different diagnostic tests are used to diagnose the cause of a particular form of equine colic, which may have greater or lesser value in certain situations. The most important distinction to make is whether the condition is managed medically or surgically. If surgery is indicated, then it must be performed as soon as possible, as delay is a dire prognostic indicator.

=== History ===
A thorough history is always taken, including signalment (age, sex, breed), recent activity, diet and recent dietary changes, anthelmintic history, if the horse is a cribber, fecal quality and when it was last passed, and any history of colic. The most important factor is time elapsed since onset of clinical signs, as this has a profound impact on prognosis. Additionally, a veterinarian will need to know any drugs given to the horse, their amount, and the time they were given, as those can help with the assessment of the colic progression and how it is responding to analgesia.

=== Physical examination ===
Heart rate rises with progression of colic, in part due to pain, but mainly due to decreased circulating volume secondary to dehydration, decreased preload from hypotension, and endotoxemia. The rate is measured over time, and its response to analgesic therapy ascertained. A pulse that continues to rise in the face of adequate analgesia is considered a surgical indication. Mucous membrane color can be assessed to appreciate the severity of haemodynamic compromise. Pale mucous membranes may be caused by decreased perfusion (as with shock), anemia due to chronic blood loss (seen with GI ulceration), and dehydration. Pink or cyanotic (blue) membrane colors are associated with a greater chance of survival (55%). Dark red, or "injected", membranes reflect increased perfusion, and the presence of a "toxic line" (a red ring over the top of the teeth where it meets the gum line, with pale or gray mucous membranes) can indicate endotoxemia. Both injected mucous membranes and the presence of a toxic line correlate to a decreased likelihood of survival, at 44%. Capillary refill time is assessed to determine hydration levels and highly correlates to perfusion of the bowel. A CRT of < 2 seconds has a survival rate of 90%, of 2.5–4 seconds a survival rate of 53%, and > 4 seconds a survival rate of 12%.

Laboratory tests can be performed to assess the cardiovascular status of the patient. Packed cell volume (PCV) is a measure of hydration status, with a value 45% being considered significant. Increasing values over repeated examination are also considered significant. The total protein (TP) of blood may also be measured, as an aid in estimating the amount of protein loss into the intestine. Its value must be interpreted along with the PCV, to take into account the hydration status. When laboratory tests are not available, hydration can be crudely assessed by tenting the skin of the neck or eyelid, looking for sunken eyes, depression, high heart rate, and feeling for tackiness of the gums. Jugular filling and quality of the peripheral pulses can be used to approximate blood pressure. Capillary refill time (CRT) may be decreased early in the colic, but generally prolongs as the disease progresses and cardiovascular status worsens.

| Percent Dehydration | Heart rate | Mucous membrane quality | CRT | Time skin tent holds | Other |
|---|---|---|---|---|---|
| 5% | Normal | Moist to slightly tacky | < 2 seconds | 1–3 seconds | Decrease in urine production |
| 8% | 40-60 bpm | Tacky | Usually 2–3 seconds | 3–5 seconds | Decrease in blood pressure |
| 10-12% | 60+ bpm | Dry | Usually > 4 seconds | 5+ seconds | Decrease in jugular fill and quality of peripheral pulses; sunken eyes present |

Weight and body condition score (BCS) is important when evaluating a horse with chronic colic, and a poor BCS in the face of good quality nutrition can indicate malabsorptive and maldigestive disorders.

Rectal temperature can help ascertain if an infectious or inflammatory cause is to blame for the colic, which is suspected if the temperature if >103F. Temperature should be taken prior to rectal examination, as the introduction of air will falsely lower rectal temperature. Coolness of extremities can indicate decreased perfusion secondary to endotoxemia. Elevated respiratory rate can indicate pain as well as acid-base disturbances. A rectal examination, auscultation of the abdomen, and nasogastric intubation should always occur in addition to the basic physical exam.

=== Rectal examination ===
Rectal examinations are a cornerstone of colic diagnosis, as many large intestinal conditions can be definitively diagnosed by this method alone. Due to the risk of harm to the horse, a rectal examination is performed by a veterinarian. Approximately 40% of the gastrointestinal tract can be examined by rectal palpation, although this can vary based on the size of the horse and the length of the examiner's arm. Structures that can be identified include the aorta, caudal pole of the left kidney, nephrosplenic ligament, caudal border of the spleen, ascending colon (left dorsal and ventral, pelvic flexure), the small intestine if distended (it is not normally palpable on rectal), the mesenteric root, the base of the cecum and the medial cecal band, and rarely the inguinal rings. The location within the colon is identified based on size, presence of sacculations, number of bands, and if fecal balls are present.

Displacements, torsions, strangulations, and impactions may be identified on rectal examination. Other non-specific findings, such as dilated small intestinal loops, may also be detected, and can play a major part in determining if surgery is necessary. Thickness of the intestinal walls may indicate infiltrative disease or abnormal muscular enlargement. Roughening of the serosal surface of the intestine can occur secondary to peritonitis. Horses that have had gastrointestinal rupture may have gritty feeling and free gas in the abdominal cavity. Surgery is usually suggested if rectal examination finds severe distention of any part of the GI tract, a tight cecum or multiple tight loops of small intestine, or inguinal hernia. However, even if the exact cause can not be determined on rectal, significant abnormal findings without specific diagnosis can indicate the need for surgery. Rectal examinations are often repeated over the course of a colic to monitor the GI tract for signs of change.

Rectals are a risk to the practitioner, and the horse is ideally examined either in stocks or over a stall door to prevent kicking, with the horse twitched, and possibly sedated if extremely painful and likely to try to go down. Buscopan is sometimes used to facilitate rectal examination and reduce the risk of tears, because it decreases the smooth muscle tone of the gastrointestinal tract, but can be contraindicated and will produce a very rapid heart rate. Because the rectum is relatively fragile, the risk of rectal tears is always present whenever an examination is performed. Severe rectal tears often result in death or euthanasia. However, the diagnostic benefits of a rectal examination almost always outweigh these risks.

=== Nasogastric intubation ===
Passing a nasogastric tube (NGT) is useful both diagnostically and therapeutically. A long tube is passed through one of the nostrils, down the esophagus, and into the stomach. Water is then pumped into the stomach, creating a siphon, and excess fluid and material (reflux) is pulled off the stomach. Healthy horses will often have less than 1 liter removed from the stomach; any more than 2 litres of fluid is considered to be significant. Horses are unable to vomit or regurgitate, therefore nasogastric intubation is therapeutically important for gastric decompression. A backup of fluid in the gastrointestinal tract will cause it to build up in the stomach, a process that can eventually lead to stomach rupture, which is inevitably fatal.

Backing up of fluid through the intestinal tract is usually due to a downstream obstruction, ileus, or proximal enteritis, and its presence usually indicates a small intestinal disease. Generally, the closer the obstruction is to the stomach, the greater amount of gastric reflux will be present. Approximately 50% of horses with gastric reflux require surgery.

=== Auscultation ===
Auscultation of the abdomen is subjective and non-specific, but can be useful. Auscultation typically is performed in a four-quadrant approach:

1. Upper flank, right side: corresponds to the cecum
2. Caudoventral abdomen, right side: corresponds to the colon
3. Upper flank, left side: corresponds to the small intestine
4. Caudoventral abdomen, left side: corresponds to colon

Each quadrant should ideally be listened to for 2 minutes. Gut sounds (borborygmi) correlate to motility of the bowel, and care should be taken to note intensity, frequency, and location. Increased gut sounds (hyper-motility) may be indicative of spasmodic colic. Decreased sound, or no sound, may be suggestive of serious changes such as ileus or ischemia, and persistence of hypomotile bowel often suggests the need for surgical intervention. Gut sounds that occur concurrently with pain may indicate obstruction of the intestinal lumen. Sounds of gas can occur with ileus, and those of fluid are associated with diarrhea which may occur with colitis. Sand may sometimes be heard on the ventral midline, presenting a typical "waves on the beach" sound in a horse with sand colic after the lower abdomen is forcefully pushed with a fist. Abdominal percussion ("pinging") can sometimes be used to determine if there is gas distention in the bowel. This may be useful to help determine the need for trocarization, either of the cecum or the colon.

=== Abdominal ultrasound ===
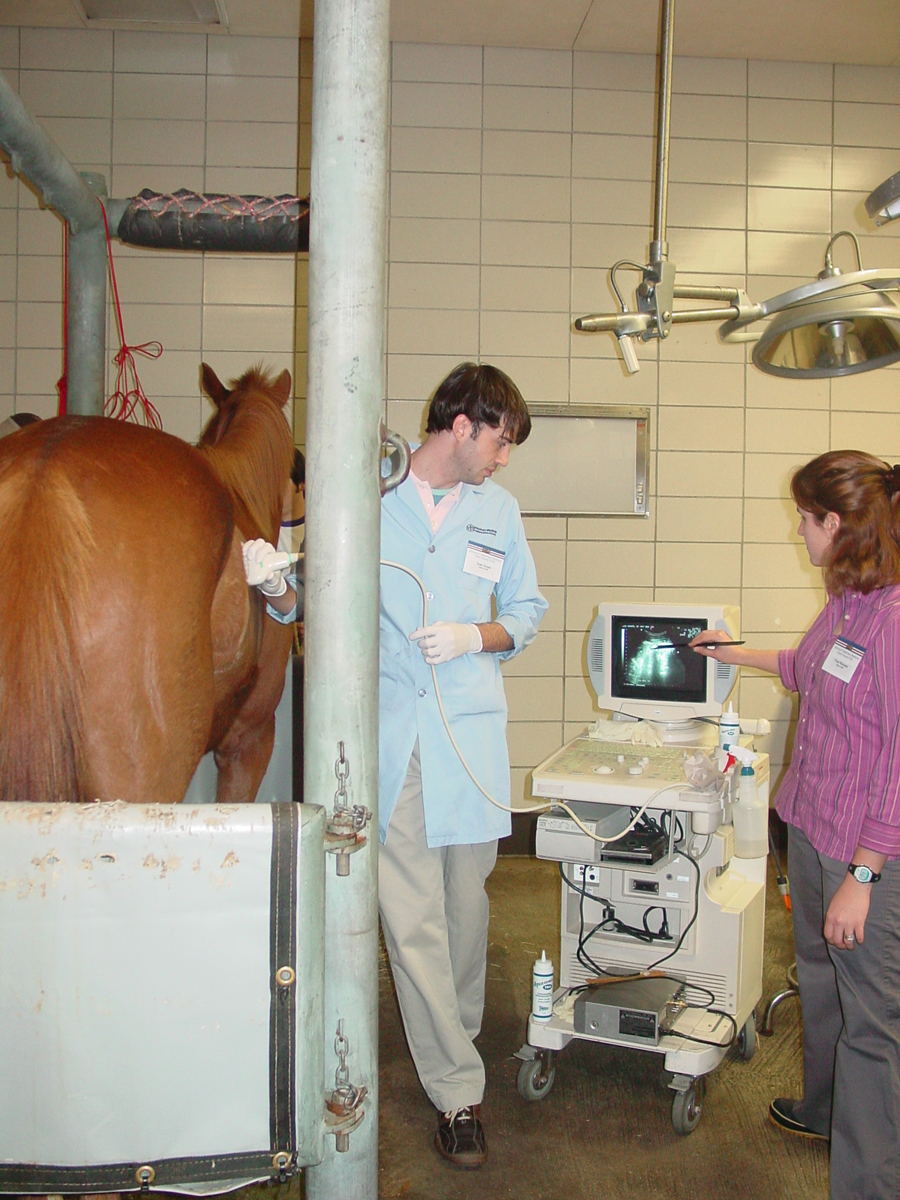
Ultrasound is a useful diagnostic tool for colics.

Ultrasound provides visualization of the thoracic and abdominal structures, and can sometimes rule out or narrow down a diagnosis. Information that may be gleaned from ultrasonographic findings include the presence of sand, distention, entrapment, strangulation, intussusception, and wall thickening of intestinal loops, as well as diagnose nephrosplenic entrapment, peritonitis, abdominal tumors, and inguinal or scrotal hernias. Abdominal ultrasound requires an experienced operator to accurately diagnose the cause of colic. It may be applied against the side of the horse, as well as transrectally.

Sand presents as a homogeneous gray and allows the ultrasound waves to penetrate deep. It is distinguishable from feces, which is less homogeneous, and gas colic, which does not allow the operator to see pass the gas. Additionally, the sand usually "sparkles" on ultrasound if it moves. Sand is best diagnosed using a 3.5 megahertz probe. Horses with gastrointestinal rupture will have peritoneal fluid accumulation, sometimes with debris, visible on ultrasound. Horses with peritonitis will often have anechoic fluid, or material in between visceral surfaces.

Differentiation between proximal enteritis and small intestinal obstruction is important to ensure correct treatment, and can be assisted with the help of ultrasound. Horses with small intestinal obstruction will usually have an intestinal diameter of -10 cm with a wall thickness of 3-5mm. Horses with proximal enteritis usually have an intestinal diameter that is narrower, but wall thickness is often greater than 6mm, containing a hyperechoic or anechoic fluid, with normal, increased, or decreased peristalsis. However, obstructions that have been present for some time may present with thickened walls and distention of the intestine.

Horses experiencing intussusception may have a characteristic "bullseye" appearance of intestine on ultrasound, which is thickened, and distended intestine proximal to the affected area. Those experiencing nephrosplenic entrapment will often have ultrasonographic changes including an inability to see the left kidney and/or tail of the spleen.

=== Abdominocentesis (belly tap) ===
Abdominocentesis, or the extraction of fluid from the peritoneum, can be useful in assessing the state of the intestines. Normal peritoneal fluid is clear, straw-colored, and of serous consistency, with a total nucleated cell count of less than 5000 cells/microliter (24–60% which are neutrophils) and a total protein of 2.5 g/dL.

Abdominocentesis allows for the evaluation of red and white blood cells, hemoglobin concentration, protein levels, and lactate levels. A high lactate in abdominal fluid suggests intestinal death and necrosis, usually due to strangulating lesion, and often indicates the need for surgical intervention. A strangulating lesion may produce high levels of red blood cells, and a serosanguinous fluid containing blood and serum. White blood cell levels may increase if there is death of intestine that leads to leakage of intestinal contents, which includes high levels of bacteria, and a neutrophil to monocyte ratio greater than or equal to 90% is suggestive of a need for surgery. "High" nucleated cell counts (15,000–800,000 cells/microliter depending on the disease present) occur with horses with peritonitis or abdominal abscesses. The protein level of abdominal fluid can give information as to the integrity of intestinal blood vessels. High protein (> 2.5 mg/dL) suggests increased capillary permeability associated with peritonitis, intestinal compromise, or blood contamination. Horses with gastrointestinal rupture will have elevated protein the majority of the time (86.4%) and 95.7% will have bacteria present. Occasionally, with sand colic, it is possible to feel the sand with the tip of the needle.

Clinical analysis is not necessarily required to analyze the fluid. Simple observation of color and turbidity can be useful in the field.

- Sanguinous fluid indicates an excess of red blood cells or hemoglobin, and may be due to leakage of the cells through a damaged intestinal wall, splenic puncture during abdominocentesis, laceration of abdominal viscera, or contamination from a skin capillary.
- Cloudy fluid is suggestive of an increased number of cells or protein.
- White fluid indicates chylous effusion.
- Green fluid indicates either gastrointestinal rupture or enterocentesis, and a second sample should be drawn to rule out the latter. Gastrointestinal rupture produces a color change in peritoneal fluid in 85.5% of cases.
- Colorless (dilute) peritoneal fluid, especially in large quantities, can indicate ascites or uroperitoneum (urine in the abdomen).
- Large amount of fluid can indicate acute peritonitis.

=== Abdominal distension ===
Any degree of abdominal distension is usually indicative of a condition affecting the large intestines, as distension of structures upstream of here would not be large enough to be visible externally. Abdominal distention may indicate the need for surgical intervention, especially if present with severe signs of colic, high heart rate, congested mucous membranes, or absent gut sounds.

=== Fecal examination ===
The amount of feces produced, and its character can be helpful, although as changes often occur relatively distant to the anus, changes may not be seen for some time. In areas where sand colic is known to be common, or if the history suggests it may be a possibility, faeces can be examined for the presence of sand, often by mixing it in water and allowing the sand to settle out over 20 minutes. However, sand is sometimes present in a normal horse's feces, so the quantity of sand present must be assessed. Testing the feces for parasite load may also help diagnose colic secondary to parasitic infection.

=== Radiography, gastroscopy, and laparoscopy ===
==== Radiography ====
Radiographs (x-rays) are sometimes used to look for sand and enteroliths. Due to the size of the adult horse's abdomen, it requires a powerful machine that is not available to all practitioners. Additionally, the quality of these images is sometimes poor.

==== Gastroscopy ====
Gastroscopy, or endoscopic evaluation of the stomach, is useful in chronic cases of colic suspected to be caused by gastric ulcers, gastric impactions, and gastric masses. A 3-meter scope is required to visualize the stomach of most horses, and the horse must be fasted prior to scoping.

==== Laparoscopy ====
Laparoscopy involves inserting a telescoping camera approximately 1 cm in diameter into the horse's abdomen, through a small incision, to visualize the gastrointestinal tract. It may be performed standing or under general anesthesia, and is less invasive than an exploratory celiotomy (abdominal exploratory surgery).

=== Rectal biopsy ===
Rectal biopsy is rarely performed due to its risks of abscess formation, rectal perforation and peritonitis, and because it requires a skilled clinical to perform. However, it can be useful in cases of suspected intestinal cancer, as well as some inflammatory diseases (such as IBD) and infiltrative diseases, like granulomatous enteritis.

== Clinical signs ==
Clinical signs of colic are usually referable to pain, although the horse may appear depressed rather than painful in cases of necrosis (tissue death) of the gastrointestinal tract, inflammation of the intestines, endotoxemia, or significant dehydration. Pain levels are often used to determine the need for surgery (See Surgical intervention). Horses are more likely to require surgery if they display severe clinical signs that can not be controlled by the administration of analgesics and sedatives, or have persistent signs that require multiple administrations of such drugs. Heart rate is often used as a measure of the animal's pain level and a heart rate >60 bpm is more likely to require surgery. However, this measure can be deceiving in the early stages of a severe colic, when the horse may still retain a relatively low rate. Additionally, pain tolerance of the individual must be taken into account, since very stoic animals with severe cases of colic may not show adequate levels of pain to suggest the need for surgery. High heart rates (>60 bpm), prolonged capillary refill time (CRT), and congested mucous membranes suggest cardiovascular compromise and the need for more intense management. Decreased or absent gut sounds often suggest the need for surgical intervention if prolonged.

A horse showing severe clinical signs, followed by a rapid and significant improvement, may have experienced gastrointestinal perforation. While this releases the pressure that originally caused so much discomfort for the horse, it results in a non-treatable peritonitis that requires euthanasia. Soon after this apparent improvement, the horse will display signs of shock, including an elevated heart rate, increased capillary refill time, rapid shallow breathing, and a change in mucous membrane color. It may also be pyretic, act depressed, or become extremely painful.

Gas distention usually produces mild clinical signs, but in some cases leads to severe signs due to pressure and tension on the mesentery. Simple obstructions often present with a slightly elevated heart rate (<60 bpm) but normal CRT and mucous membrane color. Strangulating obstructions are usually extremely painful, and the horse may have abdominal distention, congested mucous membranes, altered capillary refill time, and other signs of endotoxemia.

=== General ===
- Elevated body temperature: most commonly associated with medically managed colics such as enteritis, colitis, peritonitis, and intestinal rupture
- Elevated heart rate
- Elevated respiratory rate
- Increased capillary refill time
- Change in mucous membrane (gum) color (See Physical examination)
- Change in the degree of gut sounds (See Auscultation)
- Pawing
- Increased attention toward the abdomen, including flank watching (turning of the head to look at the abdomen and/or hind quarters), nipping, biting, or kicking
- Repeatedly lying down and rising, which may become violent when the colic is severe
- Rolling, especially when not followed by shaking after standing, and which may become violent when the colic is severe (thrashing)
- Sweating
- Change in activity level: lethargy, pacing, or a constant shifting of weight when standing
- Change in feces: decreased fecal output or a change in consistency
- Repeated flehmen response
- Stretching, abnormal posturing, or frequent attempts to urinate
- Groaning
- Bruxism
- Excess salivation (ptyalism)
- Excessive yawning
- Loss of appetite
- Abdominal distention
- Dorsal recumbency in foals
- Poor coat or weight loss (chronic colic)

== Medical management ==
Colic may be managed medically or surgically. Severe clinical signs often suggest the need for surgery, especially if they can not be controlled with analgesics. Immediate surgical intervention may be required, but surgery can be counter-indicated in some cases of colic, so diagnostic tests are used to help discover the cause of the colic and guide the practitioner in determining the need for surgery (See Diagnosis). The majority of colics (approximately 90%) can be successfully managed medically.

=== Analgesia and sedation ===
The intensity of medical management is dependent on the severity of the colic, its cause, and the financial capabilities of the owner. At the most basic level, analgesia and sedation is administered to the horse. The most commonly used analgesics for colic pain in horses are NSAIDs, such as flunixin meglumine, although opioids such as butorphanol may be used if the pain is more severe. Butrophanol is often given with alpha-2 agonists such as xylazine and detomidine to prolong the analgesic effects of the opioid. Early colic signs may be masked with the use of NSAIDs, so some practitioners prefer to examine the horse before they are given by the owner.

=== Nasogastric intubation and gastric decompression ===
Nasogastric intubation, a mainstay of colic management, is often repeated multiple times until resolution of clinical signs, both as a method of gastric reflux removal and as a way to directly administer fluids and medication into the stomach. Reflux must be removed periodically to prevent distention and possible rupture of the stomach, and to track reflux production, which aids in monitoring the progression of the colic. Its use is especially important in the case of strangulating obstruction or enteritis, since both of these cause excessive secretion of fluid into the intestine, leading to fluid back-up and distention of the stomach. Nasogastric intubation also has the benefit of providing pain relief resulting from gastric distention.

=== Fluid support ===
Fluids are commonly given, either orally by nasogastric tube or by intravenous catheter, to restore proper hydration and electrolyte balance. In cases of strangulating obstruction or enteritis, the intestine will have decreased absorption and increased secretion of fluid into the intestinal lumen, making oral fluids ineffective and possibly dangerous if they cause gastric distention and rupture. This process of secretion into the intestinal lumen leads to dehydration, and these horse require large amounts of IV fluids to prevent hypotension and subsequent cardiovascular collapse. Fluid rates are calculated by adding the fluid lost during each collection of gastric reflux to the daily maintenance requirement of the horse. Due to the fact that horses absorb water in the cecum and colon, the IV fluid requirement of horses with simple obstruction is dependent on the location of the obstruction. Those that are obstructed further distally, such as at the pelvic flexure, are able to absorb more oral fluid than those obstructed in the small intestine, and therefore require less IV fluid support. Impactions are usually managed with fluids for 3–5 days before surgery is considered. Fluids are given based on results of the physical examination, such as mucous membrane quality, PCV, and electrolyte levels. Horses in circulatory shock, such as those suffering from endotoxemia, require very high rates of IV fluid administration. Oral fluids via nasogastric tube are often given in the case of impactions to help lubricate the obstruction. Oral fluids should not be given if significant amounts of nasogastric reflux are obtained. Access to food and water will often be denied to allow careful monitoring and administration of what is taken in by the horse.

=== Intestinal lubricants and laxatives ===
In addition to fluid support, impactions are often treated with intestinal lubricants and laxatives to help move the obstruction along. Mineral oil is the most commonly used lubricant for large colon impactions, and is administered via nasogastric tube, up to 4 liters once or twice daily. It helps coat the intestine, but is not very effective for severe impactions or sand colic since it may simply bypass the obstruction. Mineral oil has the added benefit of crudely measuring GI transit time, a process which normally takes around 18 hours, since it is obvious when it is passed. The detergent dioctyl sodium sulfosuccinate (DDS) is also commonly given in oral fluids. It is more effective in softening an impaction than mineral oil, and helps stimulate intestinal motility, but can inhibit fluid absorption from the intestine and is potentially toxic so is only given in small amounts, two separate times 48 hours apart. Epsom salts are also useful for impactions, since they act both as an osmotic agent, to increase fluid in the GI tract, and as a laxative, but do run the risk of dehydration and diarrhea. Strong laxatives are not recommended for treating impactions.

=== Nutritional support ===
Horses are withheld feed when colic signs are referable to gastrointestinal disease. In long-standing cases, parenteral nutrition may be instituted. Once clinical signs improve, the horse will slowly be re-fed (introduced back to its normal diet), while being carefully monitored for pain.

=== Endotoxemia prevention ===
Endotoxemia is a serious complication of colic and warrants aggressive treatment. Endotoxin (lipopolysaccharide) is released from the cell wall of gram-negative bacteria when they die. Normally, endotoxin is prevented from entering systemic circulation by the barrier function of the intestinal mucosa, antibodies and enzymes which bind and neutralize it and, for the small amount that manages to enter the blood stream, removal by Kupffer cells in the liver. Endotoxemia occurs when there is an overgrowth and secondary die-off of gram negative bacteria, releasing mass quantities of endotoxin. This is especially common when the mucosal barrier is damaged, as with ischemia of the GI tract secondary to a strangulating lesion or displacement. Endotoxemia produces systemic effects such as cardiovascular shock, insulin resistance, and coagulation abnormalities.

Fluid support is essential to maintain blood pressure, often with the help of colloids or hypertonic saline. NSAIDs are commonly given to reduce systemic inflammation. However, they decrease the levels of certain prostaglandins that normally promote healing of the intestinal mucosa, which subsequently increases the amount of endotoxin absorbed. To counteract this, NSAIDs are sometimes administered with a lidocaine drip, which appears to reduce this particular negative effect. Flunixin may be used for this purpose at a dose lower than that used for analgesia, so can be safely given to a colicky horse without risking masking signs that the horse requires surgery. Other drugs that bind endotoxin, such as polymyxin B and Bio-Sponge, are also often used. Polymixin B prevents endotoxin from binding to inflammatory cells, but is potentially nephrotoxic, so should be used with caution in horses with azotemia, especially neonatal foals. Plasma may also be given with the intent of neutralizing endotoxin.

Laminitis is a major concern in horses suffering from endotoxemia. Ideally, prophylactic treatment should be provided to endotoxic horses, which includes the use of NSAIDs, DMSO, icing of the feet, and frog support. Horses are also sometimes administered heparin, which is thought to reduce the risk of laminitis by decreasing blood coagulability and thus blood clot formation in the capillaries of the foot.

=== Case-specific drug treatment ===
Specific causes of colic are best managed with certain drugs. These include:

- Spasmolytic agents, most commonly Buscopan, especially in the case of gas colic.
- Pro-motility agents: metoclopramide, lidocaine, bethanechol, and erythromycin are used in cases of ileus.
- Anti-inflammatories are often used in the case of enteritis or colitis.
- Anti-microbials may be administered if an infectious agent is suspected to be the underlying cause of colic.
- Phenylephrine: used in cases of nephrosplenic entrapment to contract the spleen, and is followed by light exercise to try to shift the displaced colon back into its normal position.
- Psyllium may be given via nasogastric tube to treat sand colic.
- Anthelminthics for parasitic causes of colic.

== Surgical intervention ==
Surgery poses significant expense and risks, including peritonitis, the formation of adhesions, complications secondary to general anesthesia, injury upon recovery of the horse which may require euthanasia, dehiscence, or infection of the incisional site. Additionally, surgical cases may develop post-operative ileus which requires further medical management. However, surgery may be required to save the life of the horse, and 1–2% of all colics require surgical intervention. If a section of intestine is significantly damaged, it may need to be removed (resection) and the healthy parts reattached together (anastomosis). Horses may have up to 80% of their intestines removed and still function normally, without needing a special diet.

=== Survival rates ===
In the case of colics requiring surgery, survival rates are best improved by quick recognition of colic and immediate surgical referral, rather than waiting to see if the horse improves, which only increases the extent of intestinal compromise. Survival rates are higher in surgical cases that do not require resection and anastomosis. 90% of large intestinal colic surgeries that are not due to volvulus, and 20–80% of large colon volvuluses, are discharged; while 85–90% of non strangulating small intestinal lesions, and 65–75% of strangulating intestinal lesions are discharged. 10–20% of small intestinal surgical cases require a second surgery, while only 5% of large intestinal cases do so. Horses that survive colic surgery have a high rate of return to athletic function. According to one study, approximately 86% of horses discharged returned to work, and 83.5% returned to same or better performance.

=== Adhesion formation ===
Adhesions, or scar tissue between various organs that are not normally attached within the abdomen, may occur whenever an abdominal surgery is performed. It is often seen secondary to reperfusion injury where there is ischemic bowel or after intestinal distention. This injury causes neutrophils to move into the serosa and mesothelium to be lost, which the body then attempts to repair using fibrin and collagen, leading to adhesion formation between adjacent tissues with either fibrinous or fibrous material. Adhesions may encourage a volvulus, as the attachment provides a pivot point, or force a tight turn between two adjacent loops that are now attached, leading to partial obstruction. For this reason, clinical signs vary from silent lesions to acute obstruction, encouraging future colics including intestinal obstruction or strangulation, and requiring further surgery and risk of adhesion. Generally, adhesions form within the first two months following surgery. Adhesions occur most commonly in horses with small intestinal disease (22% of all surgical colics), foals (17%), those requiring enterotomy or a resection and anastomosis, or those that develop septic peritonitis.

Prevention of adhesions begins with good surgical technique to minimize trauma to the tissue and thus reparative responses by the body. Several drugs and substances are used to try to prevent adhesion formation. Preoperative use of DMSO, a free radical scavenger, potassium penicillin, and flunixin meglumine may be given. The thick intestinal lubricant carboxymethylcellulose is often applied to the GI tract intraoperatively, to decrease trauma from handling by the surgeon and provide a physical barrier between the intestine and adjacent intestinal loops or abdominal organs. It has been shown to double the survival rate of horses, and its use is now a standard practice. Hyaluraonan can also be used to produce a physical barrier. Intraperitoneal unfractionated heparin is sometimes used, since it decreases fibrin formation and thus may decrease fibrinous adhesions. Omentectomy (removal of the omentum) is a quick, simple procedure that also greatly decreases the risk of adhesions, since the omentum is one organ that commonly adheres to the intestines. The abdomen is usually lavaged copiously before the abdomen is sutured closed, and anti-inflammatories are given postoperatively. A laparoscope may be used post-surgery to look for and break down adhesions, however there is risk of additional adhesions forming post-procedure. Encouraging motility post-surgery can also be useful, as it decreases the contact time between tissues. Adhesion-induced colic has a poor prognosis, with a 16% survival rate in one study.

=== Post-operative care ===
Small amounts of food is usually introduced as soon as possible after surgery, usually within 18–36 hours, to encourage motility and reduce the risk of ileus and the formation of adhesions. Often horses are stall rested with short bouts of hand walking to encourage intestinal motility. The incision site is carefully monitored for dehiscence, or complete failure of the incision leading to spillage of the abdominal contents out of the incision site, and the horse is not allowed turn-out until the incision has healed, usually after 30 days of stall rest. Abdominal bandages are sometimes used to help prevent the risk of dehiscence. Incisional infection doubles the time required for postoperative care, and dehiscence may lead to intestinal herniation, which reduces the likelihood of return to athletic function. Therefore, antibiotics are given 2–3 days after surgery, and temperature is constantly monitored, to help assess if an infection is present. Antibiotics are not used long-term due to the risk of antimicrobial resistance. The incision usually takes 6 months to reach 80% strength, while intestinal healing following resection and anastomosis is much faster, at a rate to 100% strength in 3 weeks. After the incision has healed adequately, the horse is turned out in a small area for another 2–3 months, and light exercise is added to improve the tone and strength of the abdominal musculature.

Weight loss of 75–100 pounds is common after colic surgery, secondary to the decreased function of the gastrointestinal tract and from muscle atrophy that occurs while the horse is rested. This weight is often rapidly replaced.

Draft horses tend to have more difficulty post-surgery because they are often under anesthesia for a longer period of time, since they have a greater amount of gastrointestinal tract to evaluate, and their increased size places more pressure on their musculature, which can lead to muscle damage. Miniature horses and fat ponies are at increased risk for hepatic lipidosis post-surgery, a serious complication.

== Prevention ==
The incidence of colic can be reduced by restricted access to simple carbohydrates including sugars from feeds with excessive molasses, providing clean feed and drinking water, preventing the ingestion of dirt or sand by using an elevated feeding surface, a regular feeding schedule, regular deworming, regular dental care, a regular diet that does not change substantially in content or proportion and prevention of heatstroke. Horses that bolt their feed are at risk of colic, and several management techniques may be used to slow down the rate of feed consumption.

Supplementing with previously mentioned form of psyllium fiber may reduce risk of sand colic if in a high-risk area. Most supplement forms are given one week per month and available wherever equine feed is purchased.

Turnout is thought to reduce the likelihood of colic, although this has not been proven. It is recommended that a horse receive ideally 18 hours of grazing time each day, as in the wild. However, many times this is difficult to manage with competition horses and those that are boarded, as well as for animals that are easy keepers with access to lush pasture and hence at risk of laminitis. Turnout on a dry lot with lower-quality fodder may have similar beneficial effects.

== See also ==
- Geriatric horses
