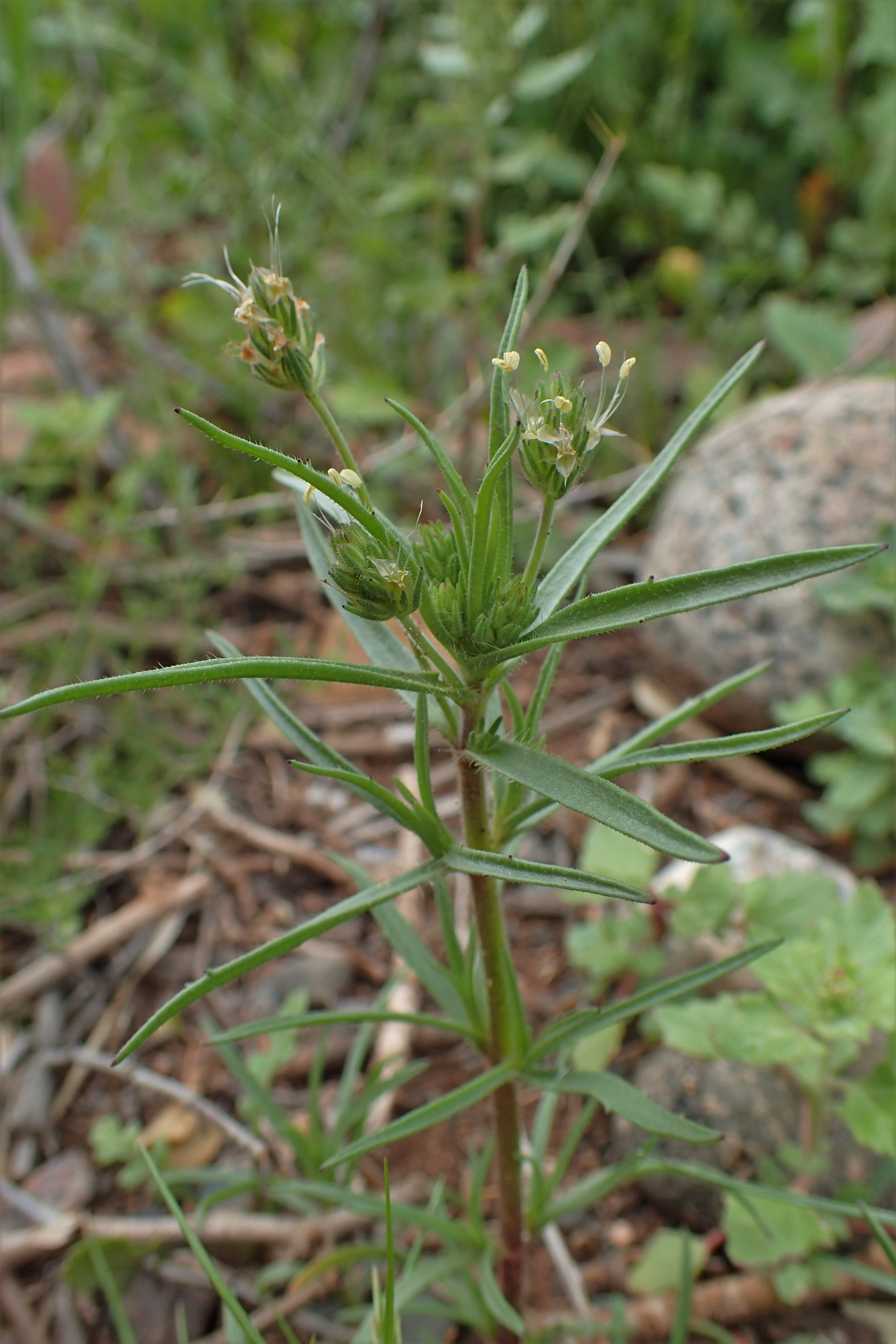
- Plantago afra near Marrakesh, Morocco

Scientific classification
- Kingdom: Plantae
- Clade: Tracheophytes
- Clade: Angiosperms
- Clade: Eudicots
- Clade: Asterids
- Order: Lamiales
- Family: Plantaginaceae
- Genus: Plantago
- Species: P. afra

Binomial name
- Plantago afra L.

Synonyms
- List: Psyllium afrum (L.) Mirb.

= Plantago afra =

Species of flowering plant in the plantain family

Plantago afra, commonly known as glandular plantain, is a flowering plant in the plantain family Plantaginaceae, and is one of a group of species in the genus Plantago formerly treated by some authors in a separate genus Psyllium. It is native to northern Africa (south to Tanzania), southern Europe, and southwestern Asia, and is locally naturalised elsewhere, including north to Great Britain. It has been extensively confused with the related species Plantago indica (branched plantain, syn. P. arenaria).

== Description ==
Plantago afra is an annual herbaceous plant.

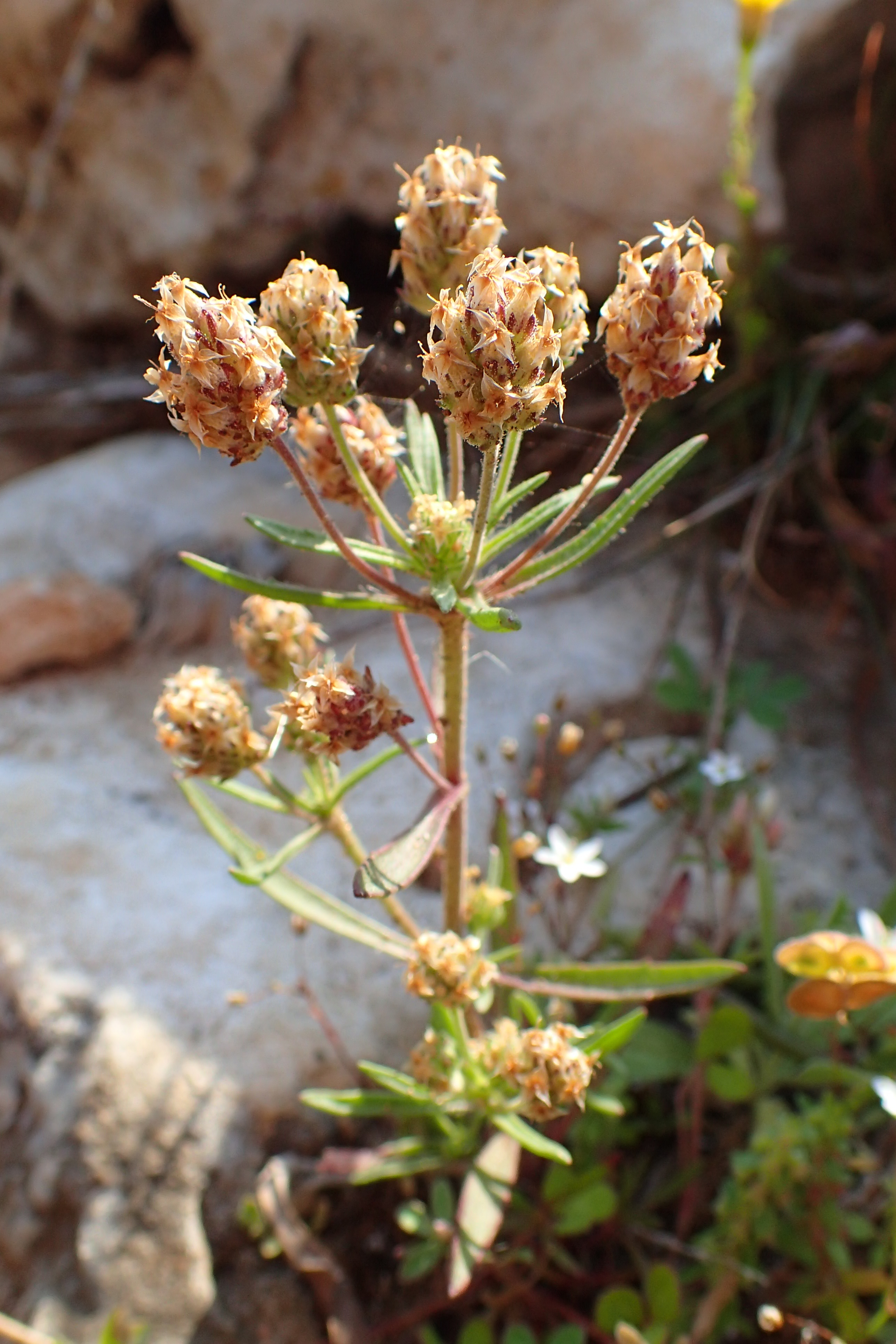
Plantago afra in Cape Greco, Cyprus
