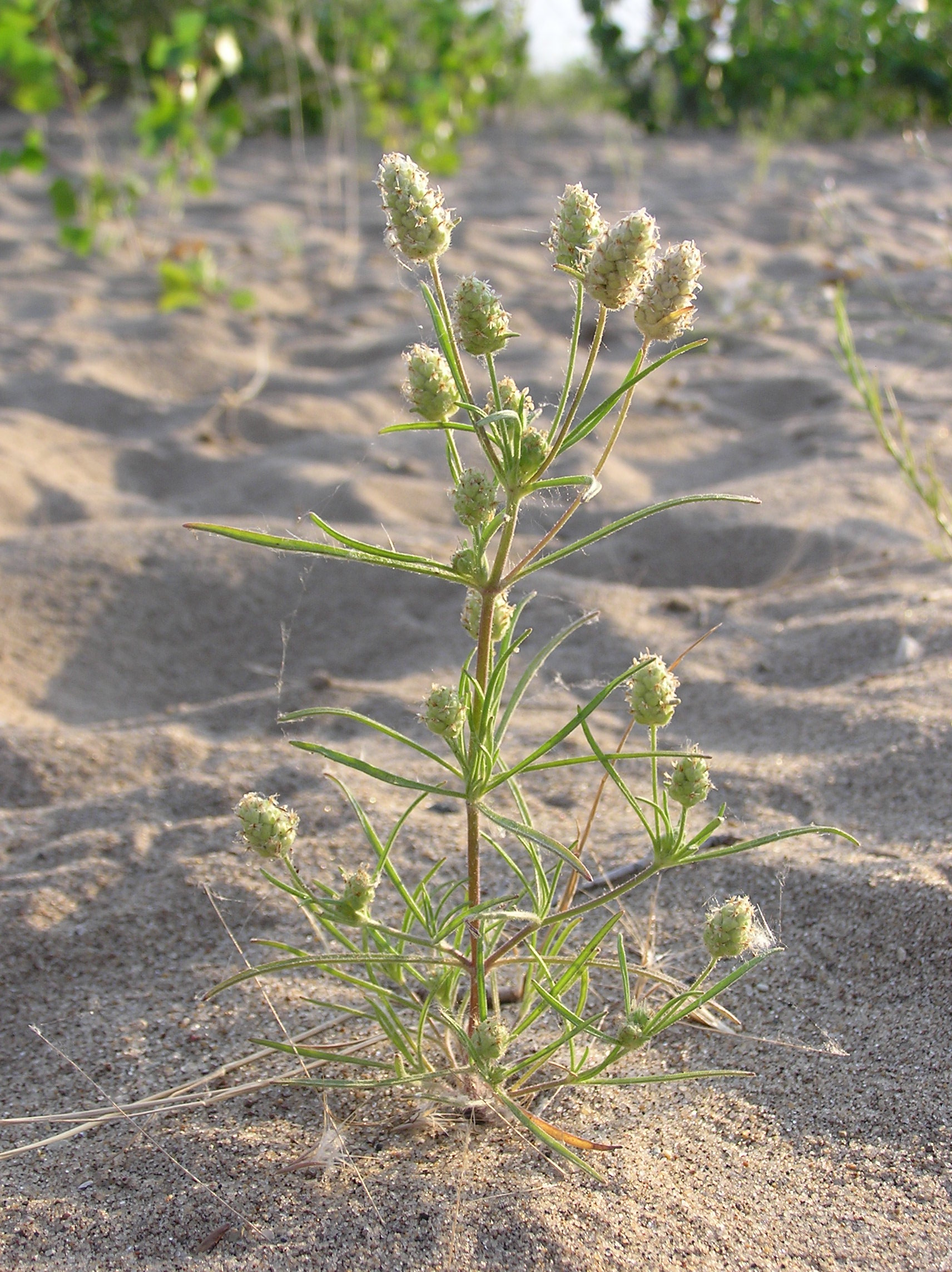

Scientific classification
- Kingdom: Plantae
- Clade: Tracheophytes
- Clade: Angiosperms
- Clade: Eudicots
- Clade: Asterids
- Order: Lamiales
- Family: Plantaginaceae
- Genus: Plantago
- Species: P. indica

Binomial name
- Plantago indica L.

Synonyms
- List: Plantago annua (Thuill.) Rauschert; Plantago arenaria Waldst. & Kit.; Plantago arenaria var. garganica Ten.; Plantago arenaria subsp. orientalis (Soják) Greuter & Burdet; Plantago arenaria var. rossica (Tuzson) Lewalle; Plantago italica S.G.Gmel. ex Steud.; Plantago latifolia Wissjul.; Plantago psyllia St.-Lag.; Plantago psyllium L.; Plantago ramosa Asch.; Plantago ruthenica Adams ex Decne.; Plantago scabra Moench; Plantago scabra subsp. orientalis (Soják) Tzvelev; Psyllium annuum Thuill.; Psyllium arenarium (Waldst. & Kit.) Mirb.; Psyllium arenarium subsp. orientale (Soó) Soják; Psyllium indicum (L.) Mirb.; Psyllium indicum subsp. orientale Soják; Psyllium ramosum Gilib.; Psyllium scabrum (Moench) Holub; Psyllium scabrum subsp. orientale (Soó) Holub

= Plantago indica =

Species of flowering plant in the plantain family

Plantago indica, commonly known as branched plantain, sand plantain, or black psyllium, is a flowering plant in the plantain family Plantaginaceae, and is one of a group of species in the genus Plantago formerly treated by some authors in a separate genus Psyllium. The plant is native to parts of Africa, Europe, Russia, and Asia, and is naturalised in many other areas such as Australia and North America. The plant can be found mostly in dry inland areas, such as those that are sandy, and also grows on roadsides and in meadows. The plant is not used broadly as a food source, but has been cultivated for its seeds which serve a medicinal use as a laxative.

Plantago indica has been widely listed as P. arenaria, a later synonym, and also extensively confused with the related species Plantago afra (glandular plantain).

== Description ==
Plantago indica is an annual herb with a taproot and an erect, hairy stem with leaves that are opposite or in whorls of three to five, and elongated internodes between leaf sets. Glandular pubescence is found on the stems, leaves, sepals, and inflorescences. The leaves are simple and have a base that is decurrent onto the petiole, an entire or slightly dentate edge, are linear or lanceolate in shape, and can reach 2.5–5 cm (1.0–2.0 in) long and 1–3 mm wide. Some leaves are modified into bracts between 0.5 and 2 cm (0.2 and 0.8 in), which has a cuspidate apex and an orbicular-ovate base. The plant has a densely flowered inflorescence with flowers that have a glabrous, brownish corolla and a calyx with broadly veined, elliptic and obovate sepals. The stamens are exserted above the corolla, and the anthers are yellow, ellipsoid, and 1.8–2.2 mm long. The style of the stigma is also well exserted, and the floral parts are hypogynous but extend superior to the ovary. The seeds are contained in capsules of 2. The seeds are 2.5–2.8 mm in size, black or blackish-brown, shiny, ellipsoid, and have a distinct central groove on the inner face.

== Ecology ==
Plantago indica is native to North Africa, most of Europe (except the far north), southwest Asia from Jordan to Turkey and Iran, western and central Russia, Kazakhstan, Kyrgyzstan, and Tajikistan. The plant has become broadly naturalised in areas of Australia, China, India, Japan, Pakistan, North America, and more locally in South America. The plant is commonly found in sandy areas such as in arid deserts and on sandy beaches, and has also been seen distributed on roadsides, and by railroad tracks.

== Uses ==
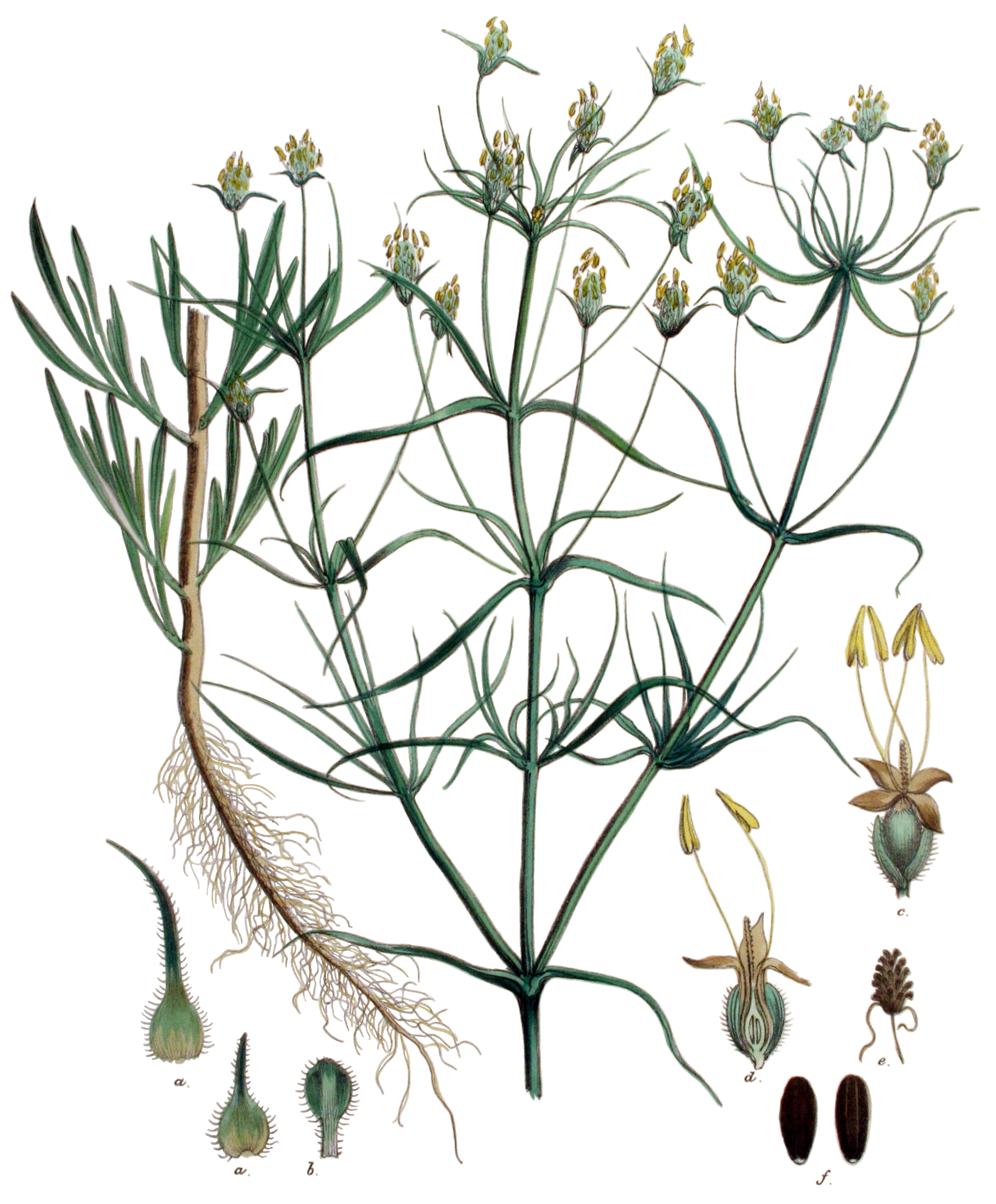
Illustration showing overall plant morphology, including flowers and seeds.

The seeds, known as French psyllium or black psyllium, are medicinally cultivated, along with other species under the psyllium common name, such as P. ovata, for use as a laxative for constipation and are also used to treat irritable bowel syndrome (IBS) and diarrhea by extracting the mucilage from the seed coat. The mucilage from the seeds has also been reported to lower the risk of coronary heart disease.
