= Equine gastric ulcer syndrome =

Equine gastric ulcer syndrome (EGUS) is a common cause of colic and decreased performance in horses. Horses form ulcers in the mucosa of the stomach, leading to pain, decreased appetite, weight loss, and behavioral changes. Treatment generally involves reducing acid production of the stomach and dietary management. Unlike some animals, however, stomach rupture is rare, and the main goal of treating is to reduce pain and improve performance of animals used for showing or racing.

== Pathophysiology ==
The digestive system of the horse evolved for its grazing lifestyle, where it would almost constantly eat small amounts of roughage throughout the day. Unlike carnivores, who produce stomach acid during meals, horses constantly secrete acid to help digest this source of grass, leading up to 9 gallons produced per day. Unchecked, the stomach acid can lower the pH to levels that will damage the gastric mucosa, leading to ulcers.

The stomach is divided into two main sections: a squamous region at the upper 1/3 of the stomach near the cardiac sphincter, and a lower glandular region. These two regions are separated by a band of tissue called the margo plicatus. The pH of the stomach contents varies by location. The most dorsal part of the stomach has the highest pH, usually close to 7, dropping to a pH of 3.0–6.0 near the margo plicatus, and reaching as low as 1.5–4.0 in the glandular regions.

The esophagus and dorsal stomach is made of stratified squamous epithelium, which is only weakly protected from the effects of hydrochloric acid, and those cells deeper in the layer of tissue transport hydrogen ions intracellularly, leading to death. This region is therefore especially vulnerable, and accounts for 80% of all gastric ulcers. The glandular portion produces hydrochloric acid and enzymes such as pepsinogen, as well as bicarbonate and mucus that helps prevent self-digestion. Mucosal blood flow is also an important factor in glandular epithelium health, since it provides oxygen and nutrients to the cells and helps to remove excess hydrogen ions.

When a horse is on a diet high in roughage, the fibrous mat of chewed roughage provides a physical barrier and helps prevent splashing of acid up onto the squamous region of the stomach. Additionally, the horse's saliva provides a chemical buffer for the acidic pH and is produced during constant chewing and swallowing, which is encouraged by high roughage.

Both the esophagus and duodenum are also at risk for ulceration. Esophageal ulceration is partially prevented by the tone of the cardia sphincter to prevent reflux, as well as by saliva, which both washes the esophagus and contains mucins that can help protect its surface. The duodenum is protected by its motility which removes HCl, glands in its surface that produce mucins, and products from the pancreas, including bicarbonate, to help neutralize the acidity. Most duodenal ulcers occur in foals, and there appears to be an association between duodenal ulcers and enteritis in these animals. Pyloric or duodenal ulcers may result in inflammation of the duodenum so profound it blocks gastric emptying, which can cause severe gastric ulcers and occasionally esophageal ulcers. Perforation secondary to ulcers, although rare, can occur both in the stomach and the duodenum, producing peritonitis. Rupture can not be predicted by ulcer severity as seen on endoscopic examination, and clinical signs are often not present until just prior to the event.

== Risk factors ==
- Diets high in grain: results in increased serum gastrin secretions and production in volatile fatty acids, and limiting high-carbohydrate feed can help reduce gastric acidity.
- Diets low in roughage: produce less of a protective fibrous mat of material in the stomach, and requires less chewing and therefore results in less buffering saliva.
- Prolonged periods of fasting, due to meal-feeding or anorexia. Fasting has been shown to drop gastric pH to <2, and erosions are found within 48 hours and ulcers within 96 hours of feed deprivation.
- Stressful events: including travel, change in environment, and illness.
- Confinement: Confinement can, in come cases, increase stress, as horses are prey animals, with a heavy flight-or-fight instinct. Horses moved from pasture to strict stall confinement may be at increased risk of ulceration of the squamous region of the stomach.
- Workload: exercise increases gastric acid production and splashes the gastric contents onto the less-protected squamous portion of the stomach. It also decreases blood flow to the stomach and delays gastric emptying.
- Inappropriate use of non-steroidal anti-inflammatory drugs (NSAIDs): NSAIDs decrease the production of prostaglandins, which normally encourage the production of the protective mucus layer of the stomach and allow for normal mucosal blood flow. Inappropriate use of NSAIDs, including excessive doses, prolonged duration of use, or "stacking" (using multiple NSAIDs at once), greatly increases the risks of gastric ulceration in the horse.
- Blister beetle toxicity: Cantharidin is caustic to the mucosa of the stomach, weakening the pH barrier and inducing risk for ulcers. The chemical is found in blister beetles, which are typically found on alfalfa harvested in the Midwestern states. Treatment of blister beetle toxicity can range depending on affect, but can be as severe as hospitalization as the toxicity can cause secondary concerns such as colic.

Horses used for competitive activities, such as showing or racing are at greatest risk of gastric ulceration, with up to 60% of show horses, 60–70% of endurance horses, 75% of event horses, and 80–90% of race horses having ulcers. These horses have stressful lives compared to non-competitive animals, which includes travel, frequent change of environment, and high workload. Additionally, their diet often consists of a higher proportion of grain relative to roughage, to account for their increased caloric requirements.

Horses undergoing treatment for other medical problems, such as illness or lameness, are also at increased risk, due to the stress of the disease and because they are often confined and placed on long-term non-steroidal anti-inflammatory drugs (NSAIDs).

Up to 50% of all foals have ulcers, which may be due to decreased feedings and recumbency. Ulcers in foals are often "silent", producing no clinical signs, and usually occur in the squamous portion of the stomach in animals four months old and younger. Glandular ulcers in foals are thought to be caused by stress, and are often seen in foals four months old and younger that are also sick or debilitated.

Unlike humans, Helicobacter infection has not been shown to be a definitive cause of gastric ulcers in horses. Although it has not been cultured, DNA from the organism has been found in the gastric mucosa using PCR. Additionally, ulcers have been shown to be colonized by bacteria which may prevent healing. Given that some horses do not respond to traditional therapy, it is sometimes recommended to add antibiotics to their treatment regimes.

== Clinical signs ==
The process of gastric ulceration is similar to esophageal reflux in people (heartburn), where acid damages the epithelium of the esophagus. Therefore, behaviors associated to pain are the most common clinical signs of a horse with EGUS. This commonly includes chronic intermittent colic, especially after eating, decreased appetite or sudden cessation of eating in the middle of a meal, weight loss, decreased performance, changes in attitude, and "girthiness". Horses with ulcers may be difficult to keep in good condition, despite a high-quality diet. Additionally, horses may display bruxism, ptyalism, and dullness. Foals may additionally have diarrhea and display a potbelly and poor hair coat. Those foals with more serious ulceration are also seen to lay in dorsal recumbency and show pain when palpated just caudal to the xiphoid process.

Horses may not display any clinical signs, even with severe gastric ulcers. However, gastric ulcers are usually more severe in horses displaying clinical signs.

== Diagnosis ==
Diagnosis is often made based on history, clinical signs, and response to treatment, but the best diagnostic tool involves endoscopic visualization of the stomach in a process called gastroscopy. The horse is fasted for at least 6 hours prior to the procedure to help reduce the amount of feed material in the stomach. They are then sedated, and an endoscope is passed through one of the nostrils, into the esophagus, and down to the stomach. The endoscope must be at least 2 meters to visualize the non-glandular region of the stomach, and 2.5–3 meters to visualize the glandular region. This is a simple and minimally invasive procedure that allows for definitive diagnosis and can be used to track healing of lesions once treatment has begun post diagnosis.

Degree of ulceration is graded both on lesion number (grade 0–4, with a grade 4 for stomachs containing >10 lesions or diffuse ulceration) and lesion severity (0-5, with 5 being deep, active, hemorrhagic ulcers). The squamous and glandular regions are graded separately.

== Treatment and prevention ==
The main goal of treatment of horses with gastric ulcers is to keep the pH of the stomach >4. Currently in the US, the only FDA approved method of treatment is through the use of the proton pump inhibitor omeprazole, which has been shown to decrease the secretion of hydrochloric acid. Treatment is expensive and usually requires at least a month of daily administration of the drug. To reduce costs, compounded omeprazole is occasionally used; however, the efficacy of these products are likely poor. Omeprazole requires 3–5 days to reach steady-state levels in horses, so horses suffering from ulcers are often started on H_{2} antagonists at the same time. For this reason, some veterinarians recommend beginning prophylactic treatment several days before a stressful event. It is best to exercise a horse 2–8 hours after administration of omeprazole, and it may be taken up more quickly if the horse is given a grain meal at the same time, which should improve efficacy.

Prophylactic use of both omeprazole and H_{2} antagonists such as ranitidine, cimetidine, and famotidine can be used to help prevent gastric ulcer formation when the horse will be placed into a stressful situation, such as travel or showing. Ranitidine has been shown to reduce ulceration when given concurrently during feed deprivation trials. H_{2} antagonists are cheaper and will decrease stomach acid production but require more frequent administration compared to PPIs, usually every eight hours. There are no studies suggesting that H_{2} antagonists improve the healing of ulcers already present. H_{2} antagonists require doses much higher than other species to block acid production in the equine stomach, possibly because so little histamine is needed to produce maximal secretion of acid. This is also true for omeprazole doses, especially if given orally.

Antacids have a short duration of effectiveness, and therefore are not very practical for use in horses because the damaging acid is produced constantly rather than just at meals. Such medications would require prohibitively frequent and excessive dosing to treat ulcers in the horse if used independently of other drugs.

Sucralfate is often used as an adjunctive therapy. At a pH <4, it becomes thick in consistency and it binds to gastric ulcerations preferably over squamous epithelial cells. It is not recommended as the sole treatment of EGUS because it has not been shown to have great efficacy in treating ulcers of the squamous region, and has not been studied in cases of glandular ulcers. If it is used, it should not be given around the time of an H_{2} antagonist, because sucralfate binds best at a lower pH.

Dietary management is critical: increasing roughage provides a physical barrier to help protect the stomach as well as encourages salivation. Horses prone to gastric ulcers should have access to hay or grass as much as possible, ideally constantly, and meal feeding should be kept to a minimum. Specifically, feeding alfalfa hay has also been shown to decrease the severity of ulcers. Grain should be reduced to a level below 0.5 kg grain/220 kg body weight, and ideally as much as possible. Corn oil may be beneficial, especially for horses taking NSAIDs, as it contains 40% linoleic aid, a substance that is thought to increase prostaglandin E2 (one of the protective prostaglandins) and decrease acid production. Additional turnout and a reduction in training or traveling can also have positive effects. Stalled horses should be kept in as stress-free of an environment as possible, with access to hay and the ability to see other horses. NSAID use should be kept to a minimum, and use of COX-2 selective NSAIDs such as firocoxib may be preferable over other commonly used NSAIDs.

== Recent studies ==
Although oral omeprazole treatment is the licensed treatment in the majority of countries, recent studies have shown long‐acting injectable omeprazole has been demonstrated to suppress acid production more markedly, more consistently and for longer than observed in previous investigations using oral omeprazole.

== Development of EGUS due to Colic ==
While there is not a significant correlation between the presence of gastric ulcers and presentation for a documented gastrointestinal colic, in horses that present with colic symptoms and have a severe lack of gastrointestinal abnormalities, severe gastric ulceration has been determined to be the source of the colic episode, given the presence of severe ulceration and the improvement in colic symptoms following treatment of ulcerations with histamine type-2 receptor antagonists. Additionally, hospitalization for colic episodes can significantly induce/increase gastric ulceration. Possible reasons for this may include colic-induced stress, feed deprivation when treating a refluxing colic, and medication that may compromise the gastric environment. It also has been shown that medically treated colic horses were more likely to develop gastric ulcers than surgical patients. Specifically, horses that presented with duodentis-proximal jejunitis has a significantly higher presence of gastric ulcers than other types of colic.

== Acid rebound following PPI treatment & possible new treatments ==
Following treatment of ulceration using proton pump inhibitors like Omeprazole, gastric acid can rebound to post treatment pH levels, possibly leading to the development of ulcerations again. Given 2 days of withheld omeprazole treatments, gastric ulceration worsened, with 17% of horses exhibiting ulceration during treatment, and 83% exhibiting ulceration post withdrawal of treatment. Acid rebound has been shown in horses for up to 7 days post treatment with proton pump inhibitors. One study found that within 3 days post treatment, ulceration returned to pre-treatment severity in some horses. Tapering treatments approaching discontinuation is a good method to reduce chances of rebound for treatment of severe ulcerations, however tapering of treatment is not recommended for treatments that are less than 8 weeks in length. Instead, a break from exercise, ample forage and a calm environment is recommended for 1–2 days following discontinuation of treatment.

New formulations of omeprazole treatments have recently been under study. Different pharmacokinetics imply different dosages, different buffering mechanisms and different enteric coatings, altering their bioavailability and release rate. Esomeprazole, another proton pump inhibitor has also recently come under study. It has been shown to be a good alternative to omeprazole if treatment shows no improvement. Nutraceuticals have also been explored as possible treatments. Oils such as vegetable and corn oil have been shown to increase gastric pH, decreasing risk of ulceration.
