= Psyllium =

Plant used as a dietary fiber

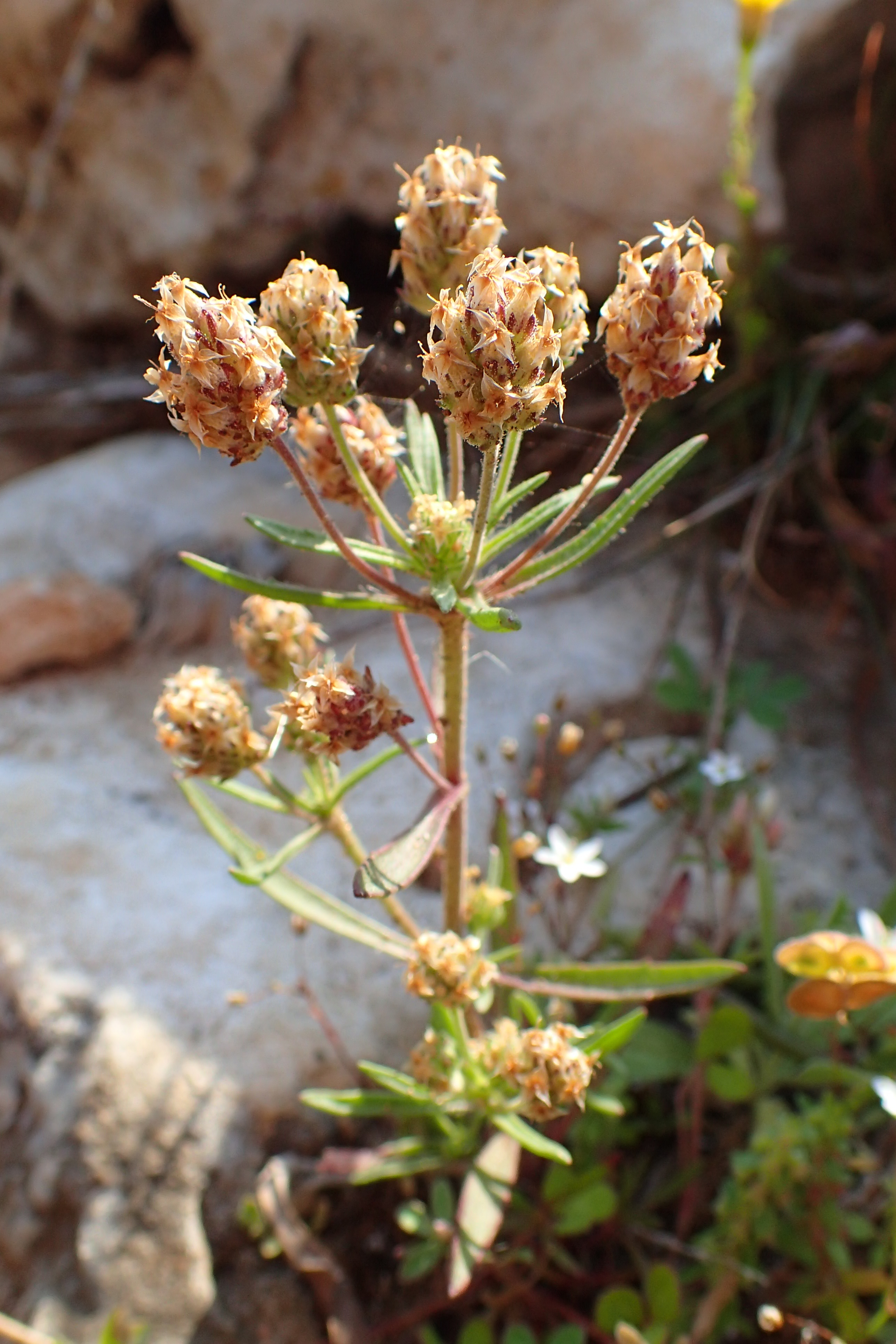
Plantago afra, a member of the plant genus from which psyllium can be derived

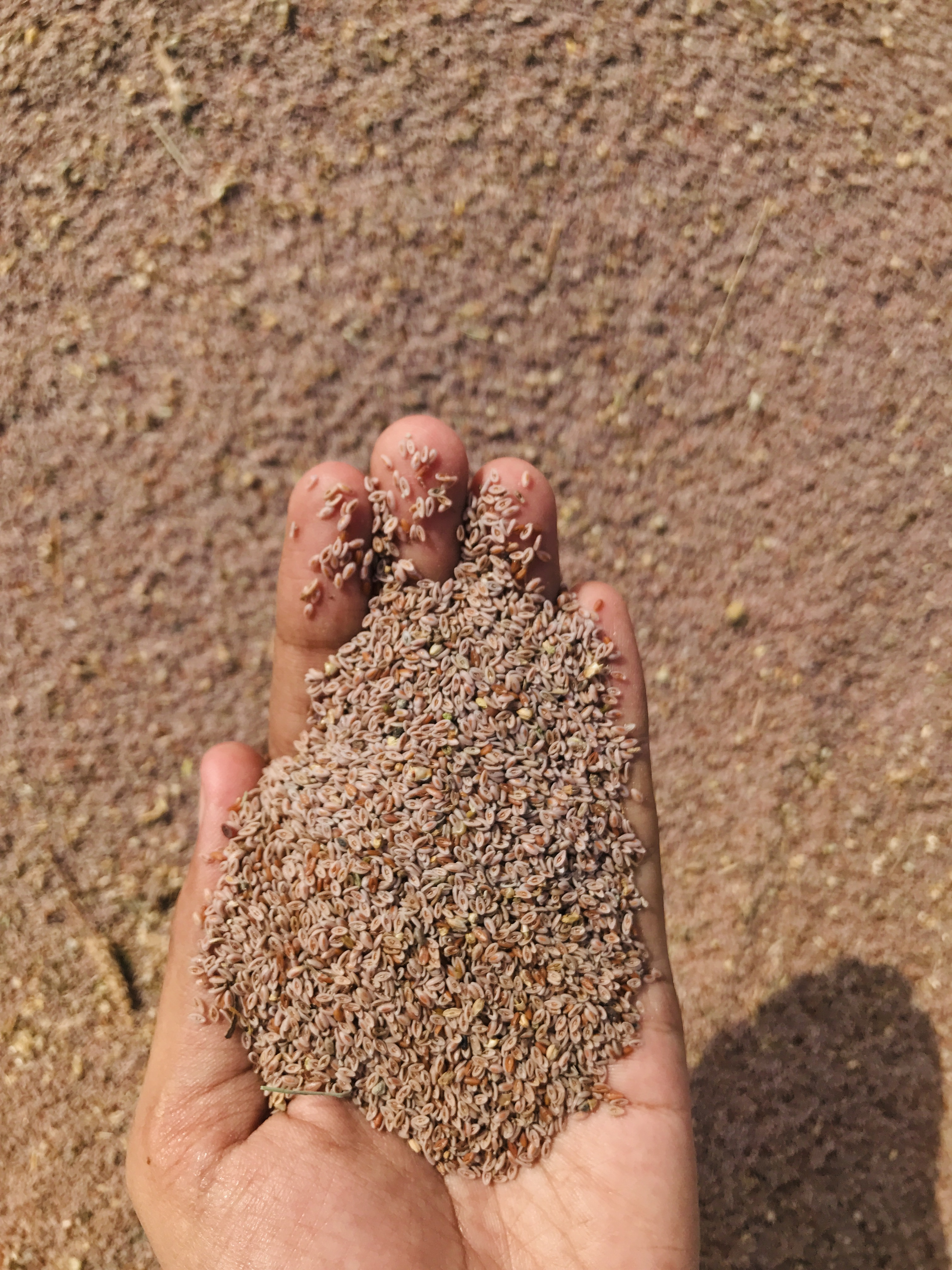
Raw psyllium seeds

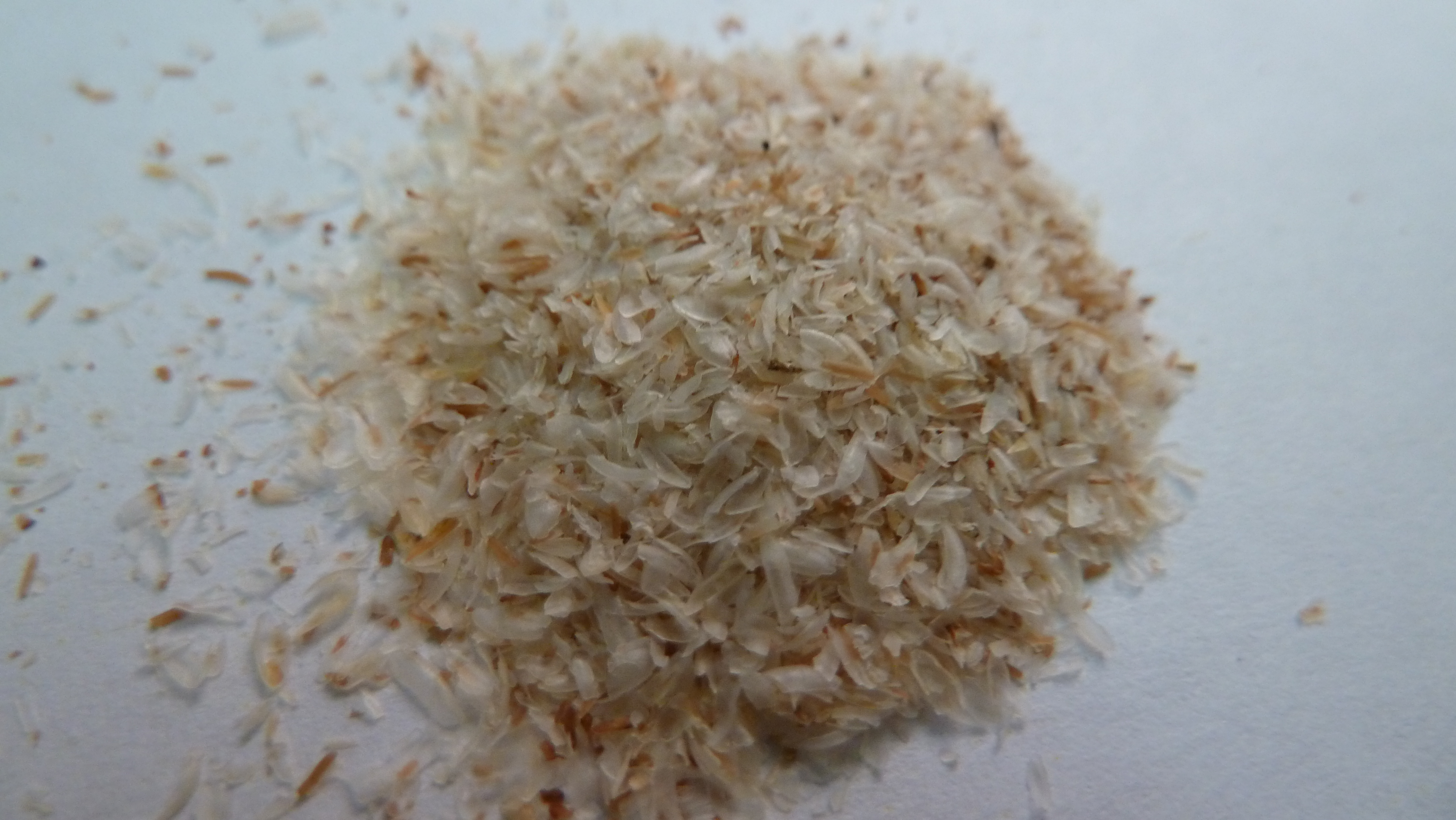
Psyllium husk after processing

Psyllium (/ˈsɪliəm/), also known as isabgol and ispaghula (/ˌɪspəˈɡuːlə/), is any of several members of the plant genus Plantago whose seeds are used commercially for the production of mucilage. Psyllium is mainly used as a dietary fiber to relieve symptoms of both constipation and mild diarrhea, and occasionally as a food thickener. Allergy to psyllium is common in workers frequently exposed to the substance.

It is generally safe and moderately effective as a laxative. Use of psyllium in the diet for three weeks or longer may lower blood cholesterol levels in people with elevated cholesterol, and may lower blood glucose levels in people with type 2 diabetes. Use of psyllium for a month or longer may produce a small reduction in systolic blood pressure.

The plants from which the seeds are extracted tolerate damp and cool climates, and are mainly cultivated in northern India.

== Uses ==
=== Preparation ===
Psyllium is produced mainly for its mucilage content. The term mucilage describes a group of clear, colorless gelling agents derived from plants. The mucilage obtained from psyllium comes from the seed coat. Mucilage is obtained by mechanical milling (i.e. grinding) of the outer layer of the seed. Mucilage yield amounts to about 25% (by weight) of the total seed yield. Plantago-seed mucilage is often referred to as husk or psyllium husk. The milled seed mucilage is a white fibrous material that is hydrophilic, meaning that its molecular structure causes it to attract and bind to water.

=== Food ===
Psyllium has been used as a thickener in ice cream and other frozen desserts. A 1.5% weight/volume ratio of psyllium mucilage exhibits binding properties that are superior to a 10% weight/volume ratio of starch mucilage. The viscosity of psyllium mucilage dispersions is relatively unaffected between temperatures of 20 and 50 °C (68 and 122 °F), by pH from 2 to 10, and by salt (sodium chloride) concentrations up to 0.15 M. Psyllium seed husks can also be used to improve texture in gluten-free baked goods, to bind meatballs, and to thicken sauces. Some people use them to manage symptoms of irritable bowel syndrome.

=== Human health ===
==== Weight loss ====
Dietary supplements containing psyllium are sold mainly to aid weight loss, although there is little scientific evidence for such effects.

A 2023 review concluded that psyllium supplementation for 12 weeks by people who were overweight or obese produced a minor amount of weight loss, although the studies assessed had only moderate to low evidence quality.

==== Constipation ====
Psyllium is mainly used as a viscous, soluble dietary fiber that is not absorbed by the small intestine. The mechanical action of psyllium mucilage is to absorb excess water while stimulating normal bowel elimination. Although its main use has been as a laxative, it is more accurately regarded as a dietary fiber to reduce the symptoms of both constipation and mild diarrhea. The laxative properties of psyllium are attributed to the fiber: it absorbs water and subsequently softens the stool. It increases flatulence (gas) to some degree. Psyllium reduces straining during defecation by increasing the bulk of stools, thereby facilitating the transit of stools in the colon. When used to treat constipation, psyllium is taken in doses of from 3.5 grams per day to 11 grams twice daily.

A 2021 review of over-the-counter treatments for constipation concluded that psyllium has modest effect in treating constipation and is generally safe and well-tolerated. Psyllium may be less effective compared to other products, such as polyethylene glycol, lactulose or fruits like prunes. Psyllium is more effective than docusate.

A 2022 review found that psyllium, in doses of 10 grams per day for at least 4 weeks, was more effective than osmotic or stimulant laxatives for increasing the number of bowel movements per week.

==== High blood cholesterol ====
In 1998, the U.S. Food and Drug Administration approved a health claim on food labels for dietary psyllium as a soluble fiber – if consumed regularly – that would reduce the risk of heart disease by lowering blood cholesterol. Clinical research demonstrated that seven grams or more per day of soluble fiber from psyllium seed husk would sufficiently lower total cholesterol and low-density lipoprotein cholesterol in people with hypercholesterolemia, two accepted biomarkers for risk of coronary heart disease. The findings were later confirmed in a meta-analysis that incorporated more evidence. To be eligible for the FDA-allowed health claim, one serving of a manufactured food or dietary supplement must contain at least 1.7 g of psyllium as soluble fiber. Whole oats, barley and foods containing beta-glucan soluble fiber were included as eligible sources for the label claim.

==== Type 2 diabetes ====
In 2014, the U.S. Food and Drug Administration approved a qualified health claim for psyllium as a possible benefit for people with diabetes, requiring FDA-approved wording on a product label: "Psyllium husk may reduce the risk of type 2 diabetes, although the FDA has concluded that there is very little scientific evidence for this claim." A meta-analysis published after the FDA decision reported that psyllium provided before meals improved fasting blood glucose and glycated hemoglobin, but that the larger effect was seen in people diagnosed with and being treated for type 2 diabetes, and only a modest improvement for people classified as pre-diabetic.

==== Hypertension ====
A 2019 meta-analysis found that use of supplemental psyllium for 8 weeks or longer reduced blood pressure by 2 mmHg in people with hypertension.

=== Veterinary medicine ===
Psyllium is a commonly used fiber supplement for treating diarrhea and constipation in dogs.

Psyllium fiber dietary supplements are used in veterinary medicine to treat sand impaction in horses to aid in elimination of sand from the horse's colon.

== Adverse effects ==
Fiber generally has few side effects.

- Mild to moderate flatulence (gas).
- Mild to moderate abdominal distension (bloating) and abdominal pain.
- Choking is a hazard if psyllium is taken without adequate water as it thickens in the throat.
- Psyllium can cause bowel obstructions or bezoars, if taken without adequate amounts of water.

=== Allergy ===
Psyllium can cause allergic reactions, including anaphylaxis. Psyllium may act as a potent inhalant allergen capable of eliciting asthma symptoms. Health care professionals at geriatric care hospitals, who are frequently exposed to psyllium in the laxatives administered to people, are commonly IgE sensitized to psyllium (13.8%), and 8.6% have clinical allergy to psyllium. In order to protect sensitized workers, psyllium has an extremely low occupational exposure limit of 150 ng/m^{3}.

== Lead contamination ==
Independent testing has identified lead contamination in commercial psyllium husk products. In 2024, the US independent testing organization ConsumerLab tested nine psyllium fiber supplements and detected lead in all of them; four exceeded alert thresholds, with levels reaching 8.5 µg per 4 g serving of fiber – more than sixty times the limit set by the California Proposition 65 standard, in some cases exceeding levels requiring a warning label by Proposition 65 of the U.S. state of California.

In 2013, in California, a legal settlement required the manufacturer of psyllium supplements to pay US$110,000 and agree to place warning labels on products exceeding acceptable lead levels. This contamination is primarily soil-derived: the plant absorbs lead naturally present in agricultural soils regardless of whether it is grown organically or conventionally. Since virtually all commercial production originates from Gujarat, India, the soil composition of that region is a key determinant of lead content in the final product. Lead levels vary considerably across batches and suppliers. Products with the lowest contamination contained less than 1 µg of lead per 4 g serving. Given that psyllium is often consumed daily – and in relatively large quantities in gluten-free and ketogenic diets, where it serves as a binding agent – consumers are advised to seek products with batch-specific heavy metal testing documentation (Certificate of Analysis, ICP-MS method).

== Cultivation ==
The genus Plantago contains over 200 species. P. ovata and P. indica are produced commercially in several European countries, Russia and surrounding countries, and India. Plantago seed, known commercially as black, French, or Spanish psyllium, is obtained from P. indica, also known as P. psyllium and P. arenaria. Seed produced from P. ovata is known in trading circles as white or blonde psyllium, Indian plantago, or isabgol. Isabgol is the common name in India for P. ovata. India dominates the world market in the production and export of psyllium.

Plantago ovata is an annual herb that grows to a height of 30–46 cm (12–18 in). Leaves are opposite, linear or linear-lanceolate, measuring 1 cm × 19 cm (0.39 in × 7.48 in). The root system has a well-developed tap root with few fibrous secondary roots. A large number of flowering shoots arise from the base of the plant. Flowers are numerous, small, and white. Plants flower about 60 days after planting. The seeds are enclosed in capsules that open at maturity.

The fields are generally irrigated prior to seeding to achieve ideal soil moisture, to enhance seed soil contact, and to avoid burying the seed too deeply as a result of later irrigations or rainfall. Maximum germination occurs at a seeding depth of 6 mm (1/4 in). Emerging seedlings are frost sensitive; therefore, planting should be delayed until conditions are expected to remain frost free. Seed is broadcast at 5.5 to 8.25 kg/hectare (5 to 7.5 lb/acre) in India. In Arizonan trials, seeding rates of 22 to 27.5 kg/ha (20 to 25 lb/acre) resulted in stands of 1 plant/25mm (1 inch) in 15 cm (6 inch) rows produced excellent yields. Weed control is normally achieved by one or two hand weedings early in the growing season. Control of weeds by pre-plant irrigation that germinates weed seeds followed by shallow tillage may be effective on fields with minimal weed pressure. Psyllium is a poor competitor with most weed species.

Plantago wilt (Fusarium oxysporum) and downy mildew (Peronospora alta) are the major diseases of Isabgol. White grubs and aphids are the major insect pests.

The flower spikes turn reddish brown at ripening, the lower leaves dry and the upper leaves yellow. The crop is harvested in the morning after the dew is gone to minimize shattering and field losses. In India, mature plants are cut 15 cm above the ground and then bound, left for a few days to dry, threshed, and winnowed.

Harvested seed must be dried to below 12% moisture to allow for cleaning, milling, and storage. Seed stored for future crops has shown a significant loss in viability after 2 years in storage.

== Commercial history ==
=== Origin ===
The brand called Sat-Isabgol first went on sale in 1937, 10 years before British rule ended in India, and has been consumed by Indians since.

=== Metamucil ===
Introduced in 1934 by G.D. Searle & Company, Metamucil was acquired by Procter & Gamble in 1985. The name is a combination of the Greek word for change (meta) and the class of fiber that it utilizes (mucilage). In its early years, Metamucil achieved sporadic drug-store distribution as a "behind the counter" product – sold in pharmacies but not on the shelf, so that the pharmacist might counsel the purchaser on correct usage. Since 1974, the brand was also marketed to consumers by print and TV advertising and became available in food outlets. Flavored versions were added in 1979.

The brand is sold as powdered drink mixes, capsules, gummies, and wafers in a variety of flavors. Metamucil contains psyllium seed husks as the active ingredient. It is manufactured in Phoenix, Arizona, by Procter & Gamble. When first marketed to consumers in 1974, Metamucil was marketed as a laxative. The advertising slogan at that time was "If not nature, then Metamucil". Procter & Gamble sought to make Metamucil a household name by advertising in magazines and on television, using the claim "All fiber is not created equal".
