= P. amplexicaulis =

P. amplexicaulis may refer to:

- Persicaria amplexicaulis, a plant species
- Plantago amplexicaulis, a plant species
