= P. princeps =

P. princeps may refer to:

- Phidippus princeps, a jumping spider species in the genus Phidippus found in the United States and Canada
- Plantago princeps, the ale, a flowering plant species endemic to Hawaii
- Pleuroploca princeps, a sea snail species
- Ploceus princeps, the Príncipe weaver, a bird species endemic to São Tomé and Príncipe
- Pseudolimnophila princeps, a crane fly species in the genus Pseudolimnophila
- Psilophyton princeps, an extinct vascular plant species

== Synonyms ==
- Passerculus princeps, a synonym for Passerculus sandwichensis, the Savannah sparrow, a bird species found in America
- Pirimela princeps, a synonym for Pirimela denticulata, a crab species found from the British Isles to Mauritania, the Mediterranean Sea, the Canary Islands, the Cape Verde Islands and the Azores
