= Plantago nubicola =

Scientific classification
- Kingdom: Plantae
- Clade: Embryophytes
- Clade: Tracheophytes
- Clade: Angiosperms
- Clade: Eudicots
- Clade: Asterids
- Order: Lamiales
- Family: Plantaginaceae
- Genus: Plantago
- Species: P. nubicola

Binomial name
- Plantago nubicola (Decne.) Rahn

Synonyms
- Bougueria nubicola Decne.

Species of flowering plant in the plantain family

Plantago nubicola is a plant found in Peru, Bolivia, and Argentina.

It was long classified as Bougueria nubicola, the only species in the genus Bougueria, and indeed it has a number of characteristics which make it different from the rest of Plantago. Nor is its placement in Plantago easy to reconcile with its geographical distribution (in particular, its closest relative appears to be Plantago ovata which is found in the Mediterranean and only recently introduced to North America). However, molecular data from several studies places P. nubicola within the genus Plantago.
