= California plantain =

California plantain is a common name for several plants and may refer to:

- Plantago erecta, native to Baja California, California, and Oregon
- Plantago hookeriana, native to Texas, Louisiana, and Mississippi
