= P. ovata =

P. ovata may refer to:

- Phymorhynchus ovata, a sea snail species
- Pineda ovata, a flowering plant species native to the Andes of Bolivia
- Plantago ovata (also Psyllium ovata), the desert indianwheat, a medicinal plant species native to Western Asia and Southern Asia
