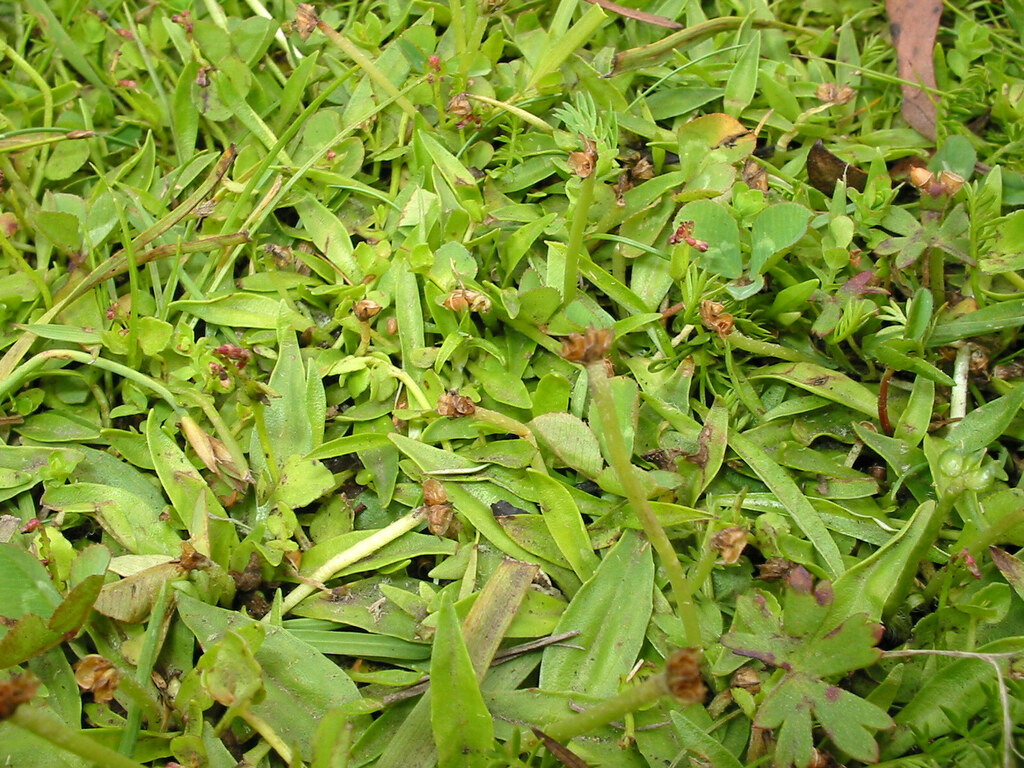

Scientific classification
- Kingdom: Plantae
- Clade: Tracheophytes
- Clade: Angiosperms
- Clade: Eudicots
- Clade: Asterids
- Order: Lamiales
- Family: Plantaginaceae
- Genus: Plantago
- Species: P. palustris

Binomial name
- Plantago palustris L.R.Fraser & Vickery

= Plantago palustris =

Species of flowering plant in the plantain family

Plantago palustris is a species of flowering plant in the family Plantaginaceae, native to New South Wales.

It was first described in 1937 by Lilian Ross Fraser and Joyce Winifred Vickery from a specimen collected in a swamp at Barrington Tops.
