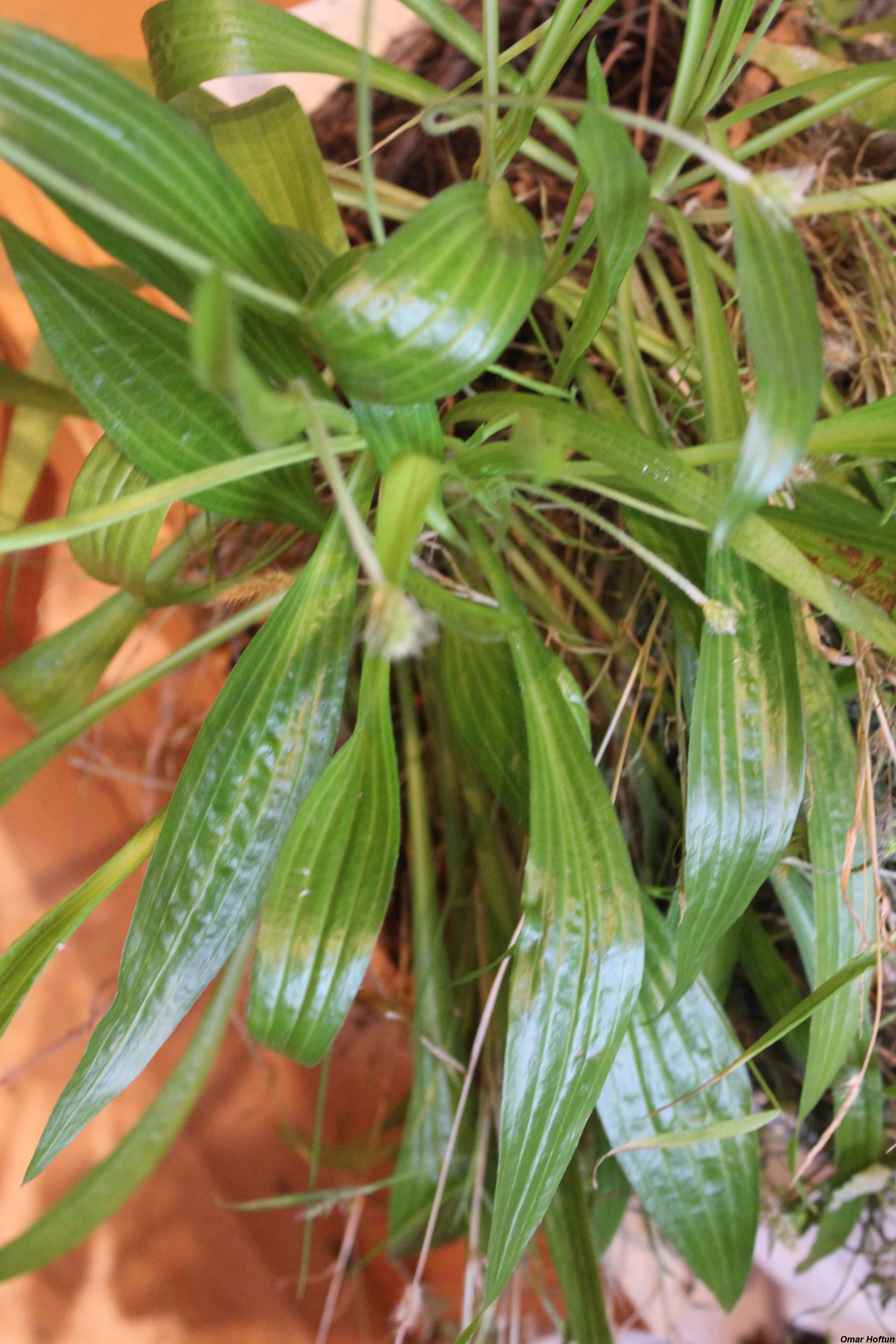

Scientific classification
- Kingdom: Plantae
- Clade: Embryophytes
- Clade: Tracheophytes
- Clade: Angiosperms
- Clade: Eudicots
- Clade: Asterids
- Order: Lamiales
- Family: Plantaginaceae
- Genus: Plantago
- Species: P. leiopetala

Binomial name
- Plantago leiopetala Lowe

= Plantago leiopetala =

Madeira plantain

Species of flowering plant in the plantain family

Plantago leiopetala is a herbaceous perennial, caulescent with a thick woody, white pubescent stem up to 6 cm (2.4 in) in height, bearing the bases of old petioles and scapes. Lanceolate, glabrous or glabrescent leaves up to 21 cm (8.3 in) in length, borne in rosette at end of stem. Spikes, 1–3 cm, supported by scapes, 30 cm (12 in) in length. Flowers with generally glabrous sepals, sometimes shortly villous above, corolla-lobes 2.1–3 mm. Flowers from March to July.

== Distribution ==
A rare plant endemic to the islands of Madeira and Porto Santo. It inhabits cliffs and rocky slopes on the north coast of Madeira from São Jorge west to Porto do Moniz and on higher peaks and rocky areas of Porto Santo.

== Gallery ==
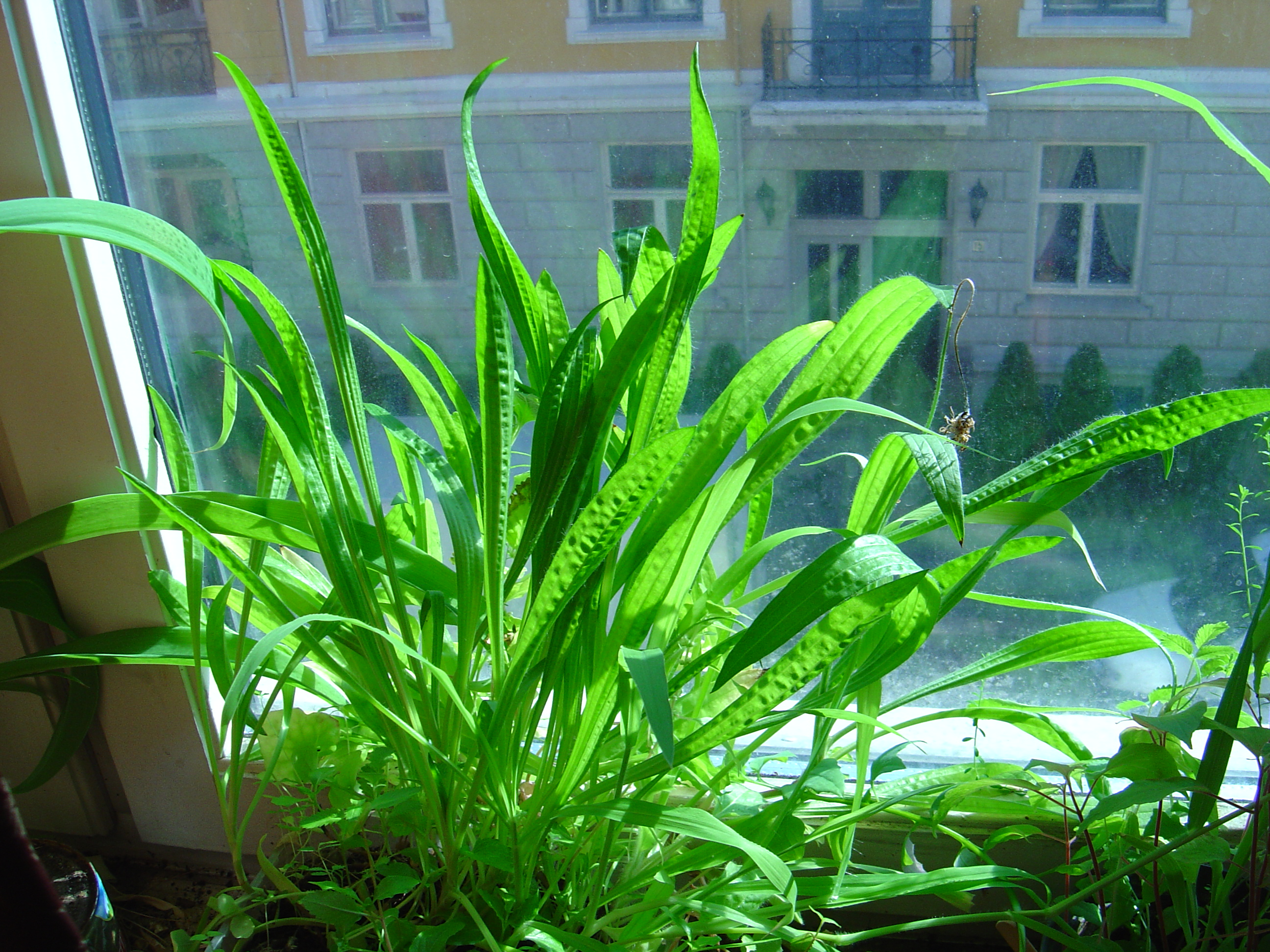
Plantago leiopetala, cultivated plants

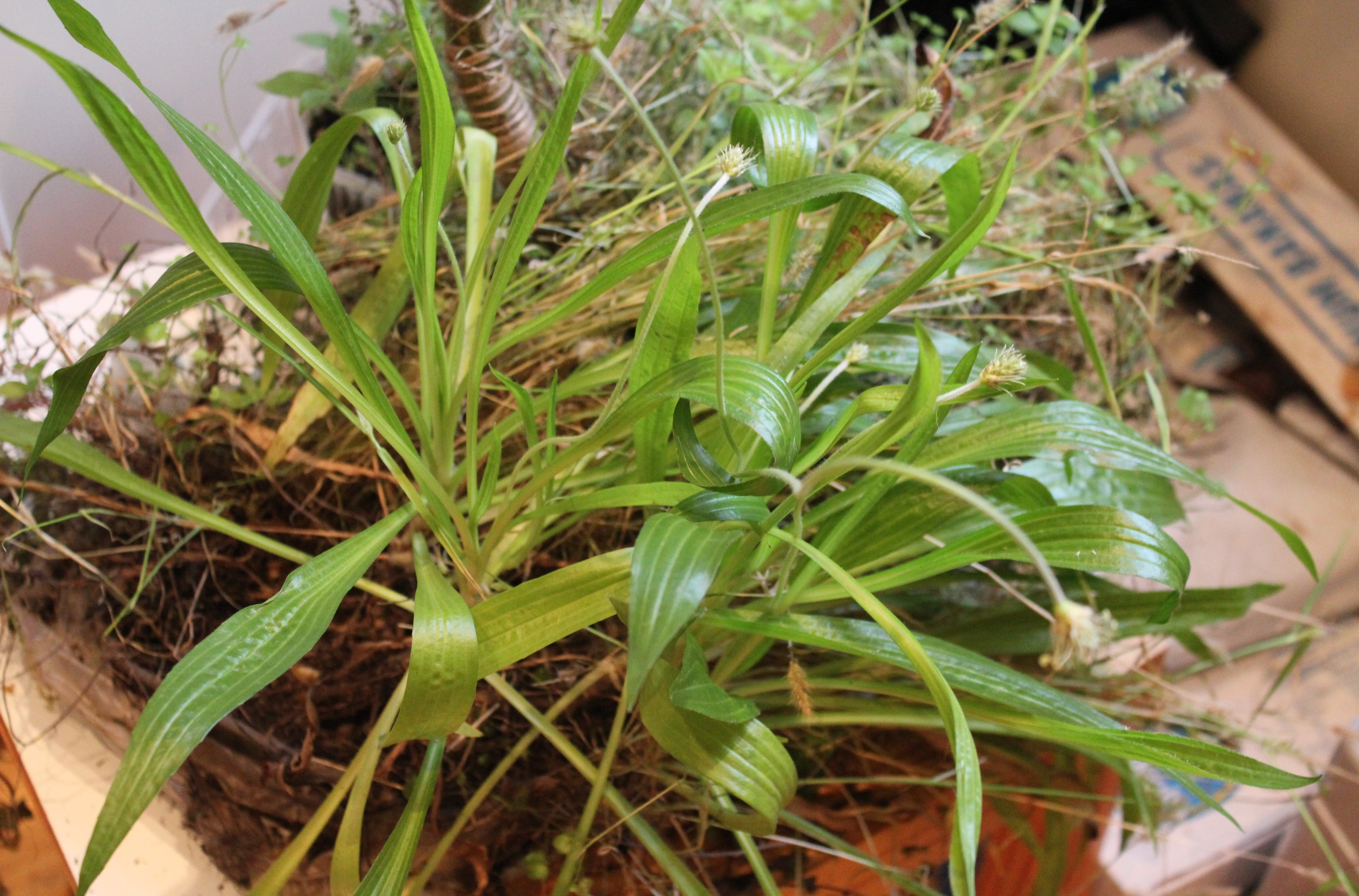
Plantago leiopetala, a whole, branched plant with inflorescences at an early stage with stigmas

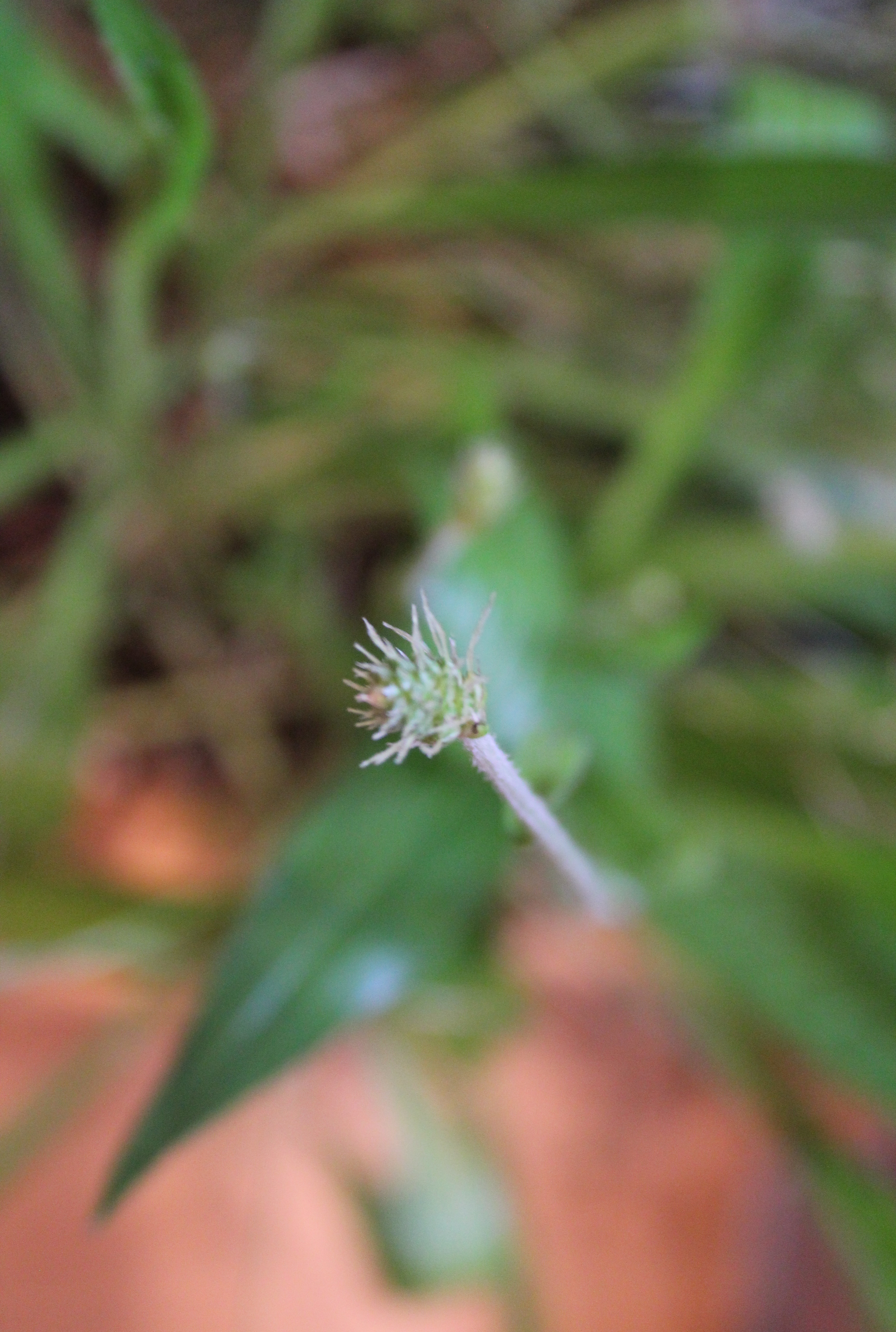
Plantago leiopetala, inflorescence at an early stage with stigmas

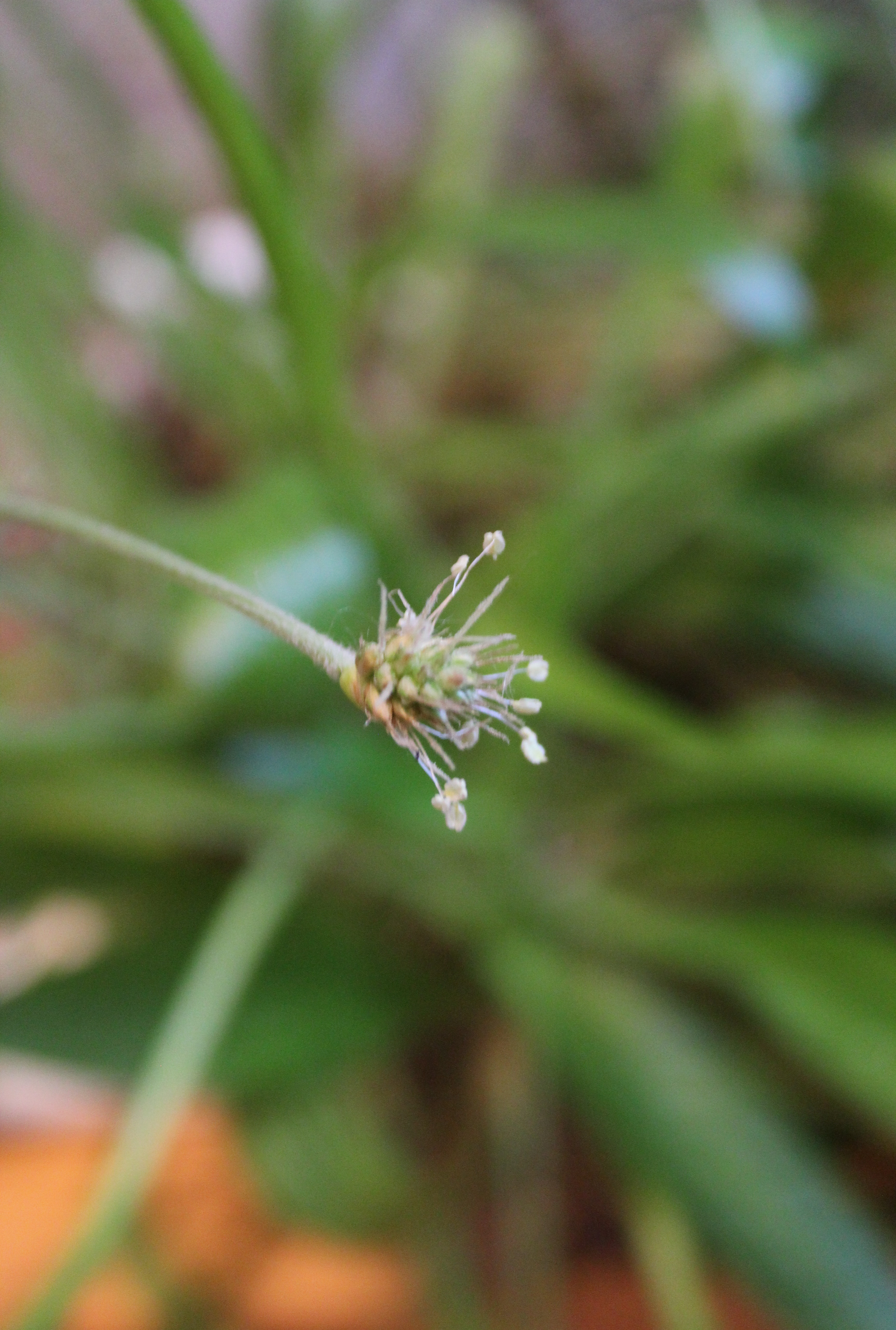
Plantago leiopetala inflorescence at medium stage with both stamens and stigmas

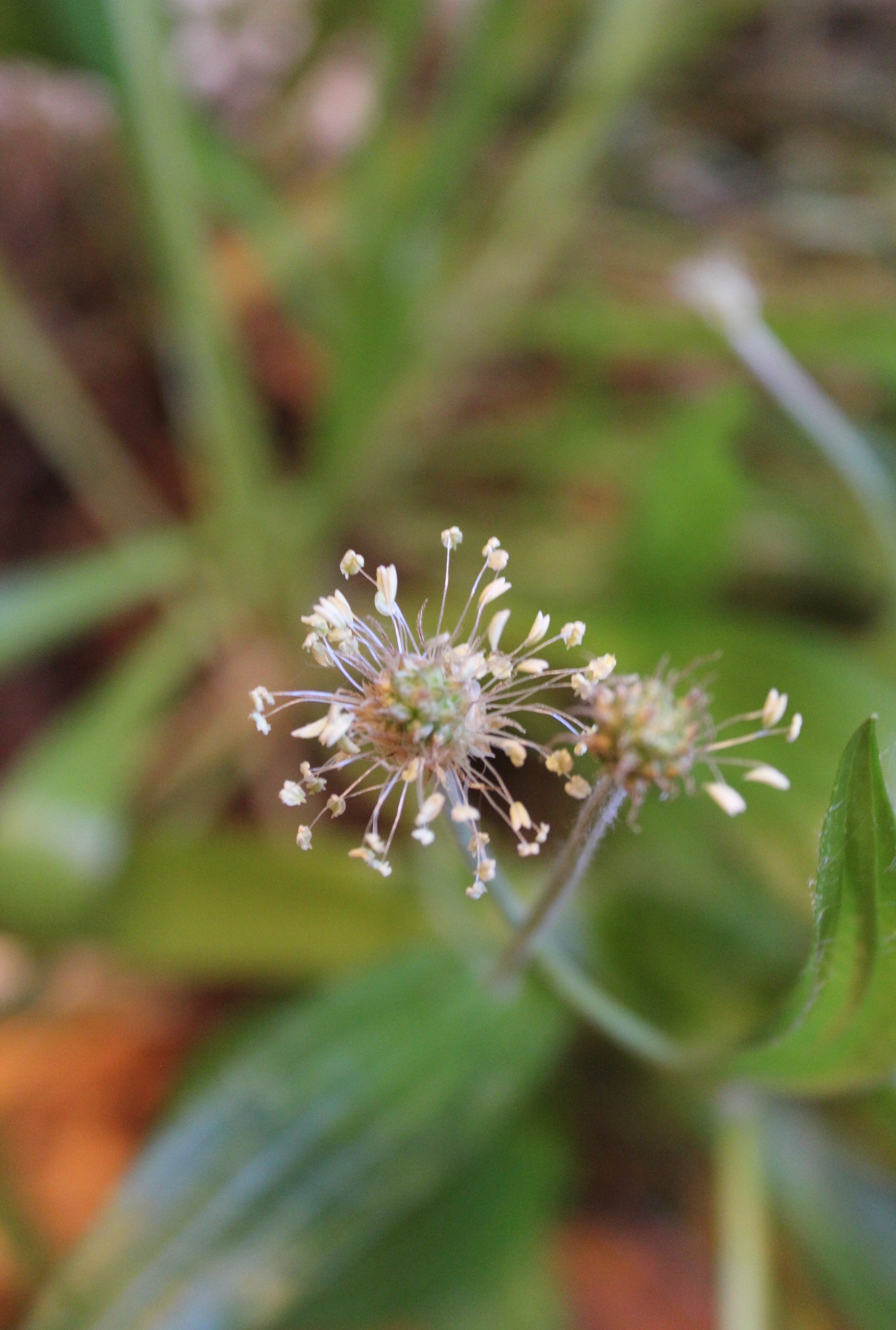
Plantago leiopetala with stamens

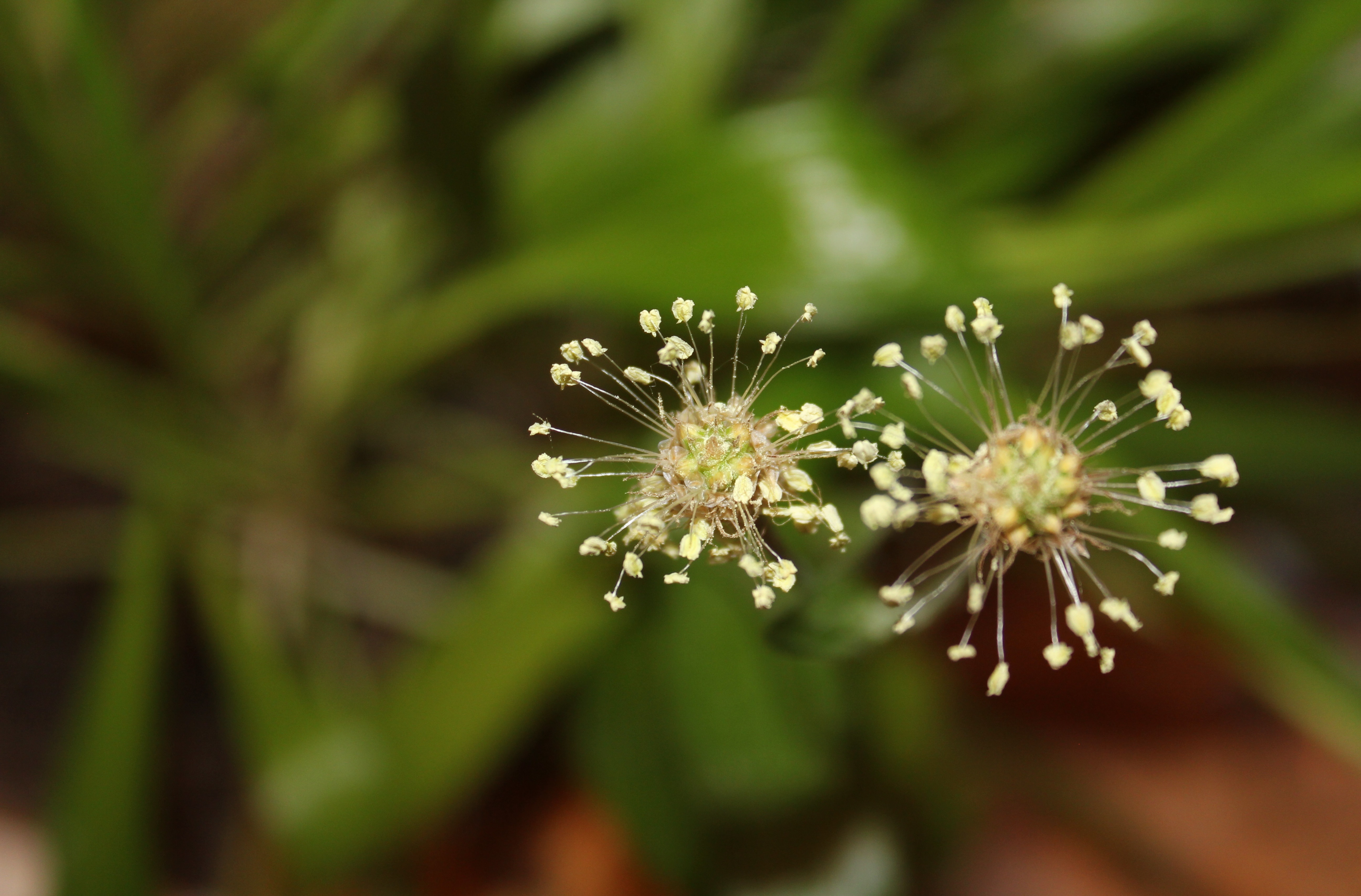
Plantago leiopetala inflorescences at a later stage with stamens

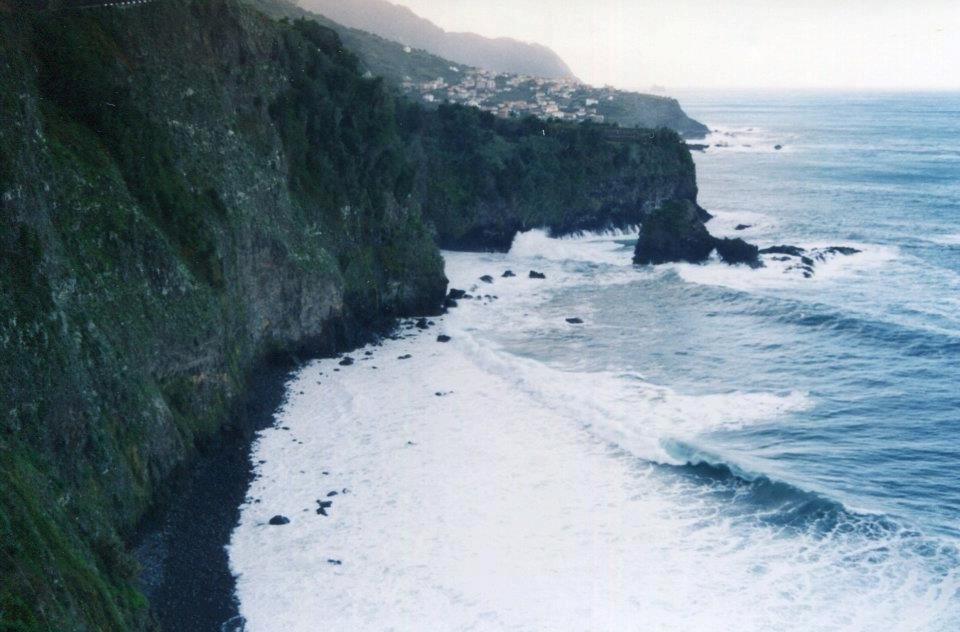
Vertical cliffs facing the sea are the habitat for Plantago leiopetala. Porto Moniz.
