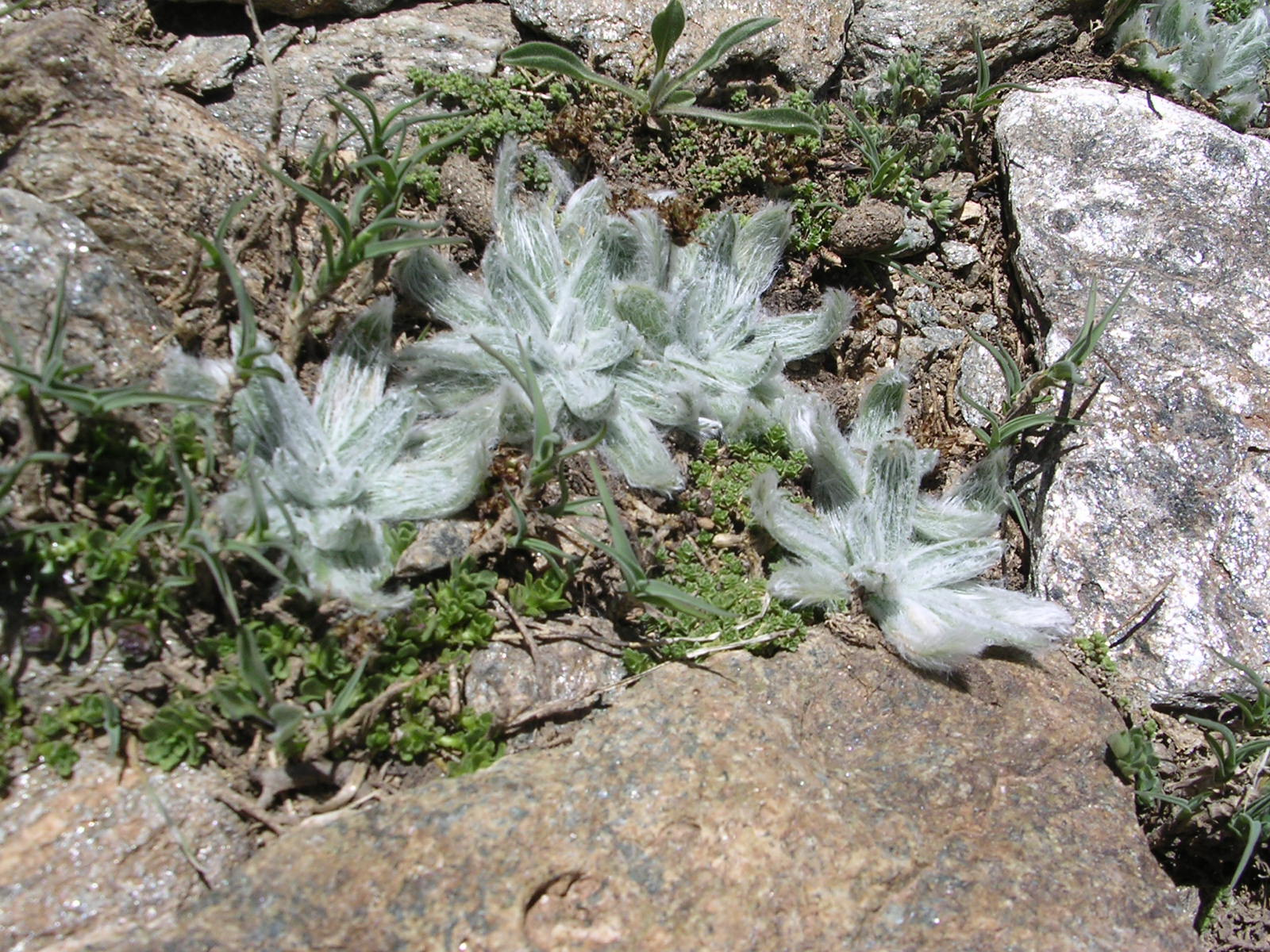

Scientific classification
- Kingdom: Plantae
- Clade: Embryophytes
- Clade: Tracheophytes
- Clade: Angiosperms
- Clade: Eudicots
- Clade: Asterids
- Order: Lamiales
- Family: Plantaginaceae
- Genus: Plantago
- Species: P. nivalis

Binomial name
- Plantago nivalis Boiss.

Synonyms
- Plantago thalackeri Pau

= Plantago nivalis =

Species of flowering plant in the plantain family

Plantago nivalis is a species of flowering plant in the family Plantaginaceae. It is found in the Sierra Nevada of Spain.
