= Plantago gunnii =

Scientific classification
- Kingdom: Plantae
- Clade: Embryophytes
- Clade: Tracheophytes
- Clade: Angiosperms
- Clade: Eudicots
- Clade: Asterids
- Order: Lamiales
- Family: Plantaginaceae
- Genus: Plantago
- Species: P. gunnii

Binomial name
- Plantago gunnii Hook.f. (1846)
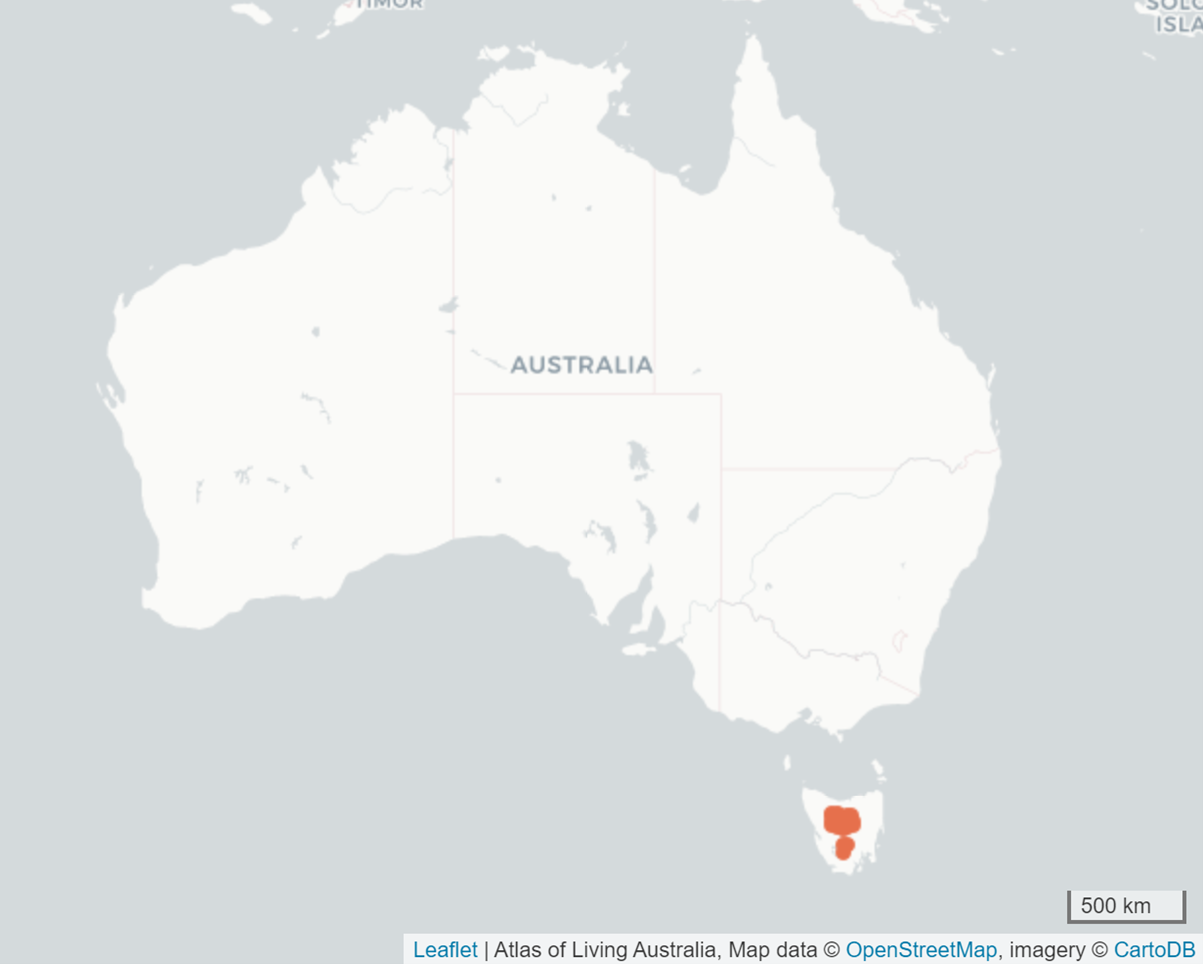

Species of flowering plant

Plantago gunnii is endemic to Tasmania and is commonly referred to as bolster plantain or bolster plantago. The etymology of the genus Plantago comes from the Latin words planta (the sole of a foot) and the suffix –ago (indicating resemblance), which is represented by the leaves pressed flat against the ground. The species name gunnii is in honour of Ronald Campbell Gunn of Launceston, who first discovered the species.

== Description ==
Plantago gunnii is a tiny perennial rosette herb that is one of the six endemic Plantago of Tasmania, Australia. This tiny herb reaches a maximum of 2–3 cm (0.79–1.18 in) in height and up to 1.5 cm (0.59 in) wide. Similar to other Plantago species within the Plantaginaceae family, P. gunnii produces a basal rosette that produces spatulate leaves ranging between 6–12 mm (0.24–0.47 in) long. One of this species' key morphological features is its long erect hairs scattered across its thick leaves. Flowering happens in summer, when the plant erects a small hairy solitary stalk, sometimes forming two small stalks that extend in length as the seed matures. Pollination is likely through wind, as P. gunnii sits elevated above cushion plants within its alpine ecosystem, and the species have long filaments on versatile anthers.

== Habitat and distribution ==
P. gunnii was given its common name, bolster plantago, because of its distribution as the species is restricted only found in bolster (cushion) moor communities in alpine environments on dolerite mountains of Tasmania. Bolster moor communities consist predominately of cushion plant species in Tasmania that occupy tundra, alpine and treeless alpine vegetation. Within this community are several alpine and subalpine species, with cushion plants making up >50% of plant cover. P. gunnii is one of the typical understorey Scrambler/Climber/Epiphytes species expected to occur in these ecosystems that occur in alpine and subalpine areas of Tasmania but are most common in the Eastern Central Plateau between 900 and 1,200 m (3,000 and 3,900 ft), similarly coinciding with Abrotanella for steroids and other cushion plant species. The local environment in which this alpine cushion plant ecosystem and P. gunnii thrive are broad valley plains of high rainfall with poor drainage, which are often wet and peaty.

== Conservation status ==
The species itself is not listed. However, it is considered rare and of conservational significance. Cushion moorlands, where the species is found, are listed as threatened under Schedule 3A of the Nature Conservation Act. Cushion moorlands are considered a rare community, with their main management issue surrounding fire as most species within this ecosystem are fire sensitive with slow recovery to regenerate in the event of a fire. Climate change is also predicted to alter physical processes in this ecosystem, which could cause further threats to the ecological processes of this ecosystem.
