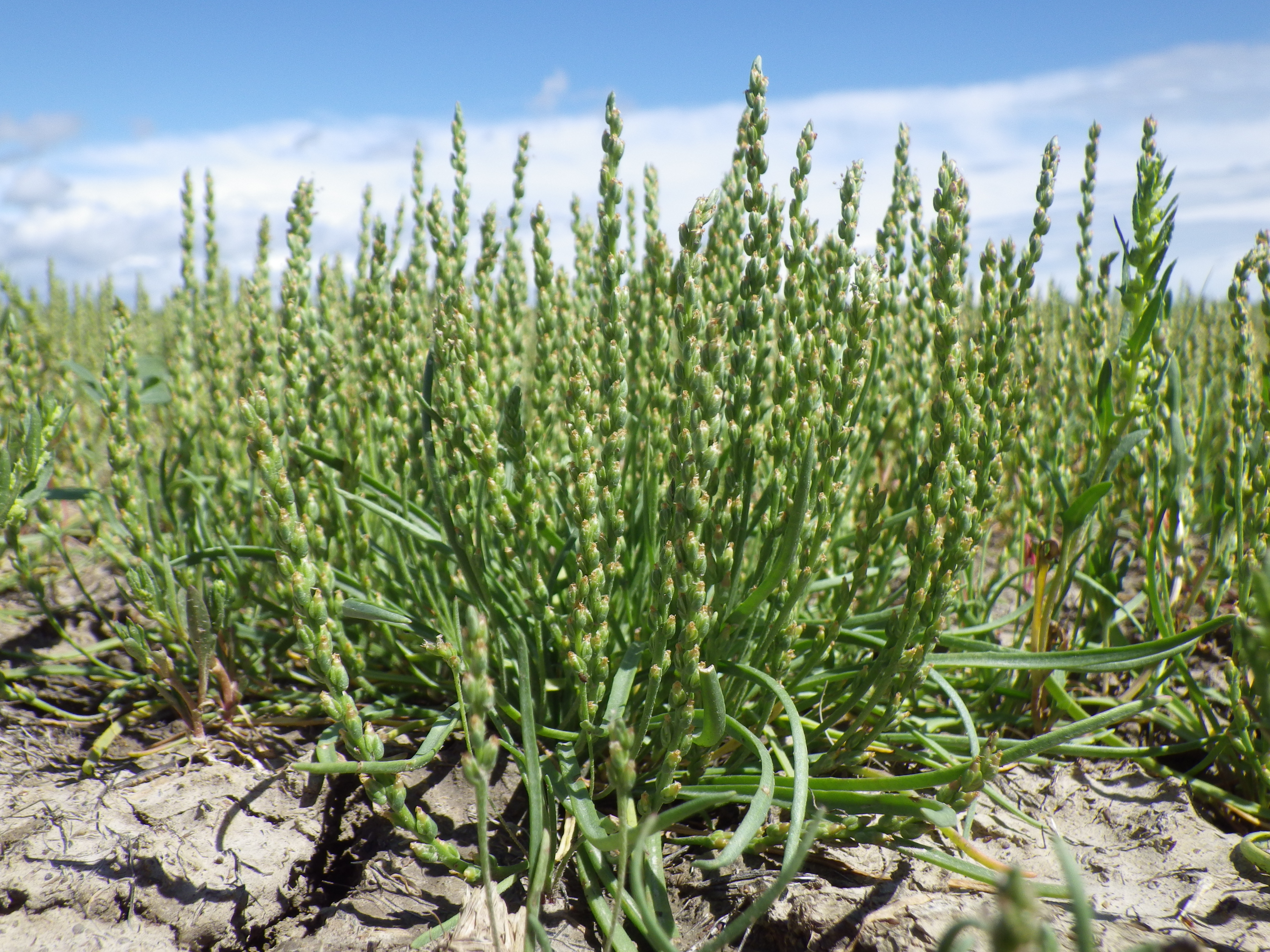

Conservation status
- Apparently Secure (NatureServe)

Scientific classification
- Kingdom: Plantae
- Clade: Embryophytes
- Clade: Tracheophytes
- Clade: Angiosperms
- Clade: Eudicots
- Clade: Asterids
- Order: Lamiales
- Family: Plantaginaceae
- Genus: Plantago
- Species: P. elongata

Binomial name
- Plantago elongata Pursh

Synonyms
- Plantago bigelovii; Plantago californica; Plantago linearifolia; Plantago myosuroides

= Plantago elongata =

Plant species in the veronica family

Plantago elongata is a species of plantain known by the common names prairie plantain and slender plantain.

It is native to much of western North America, from British Columbia to California and as far east as Minnesota. It grows in wet habitats, such as vernal pools and wet meadows, including areas with saline and alkali soils, such as beaches.

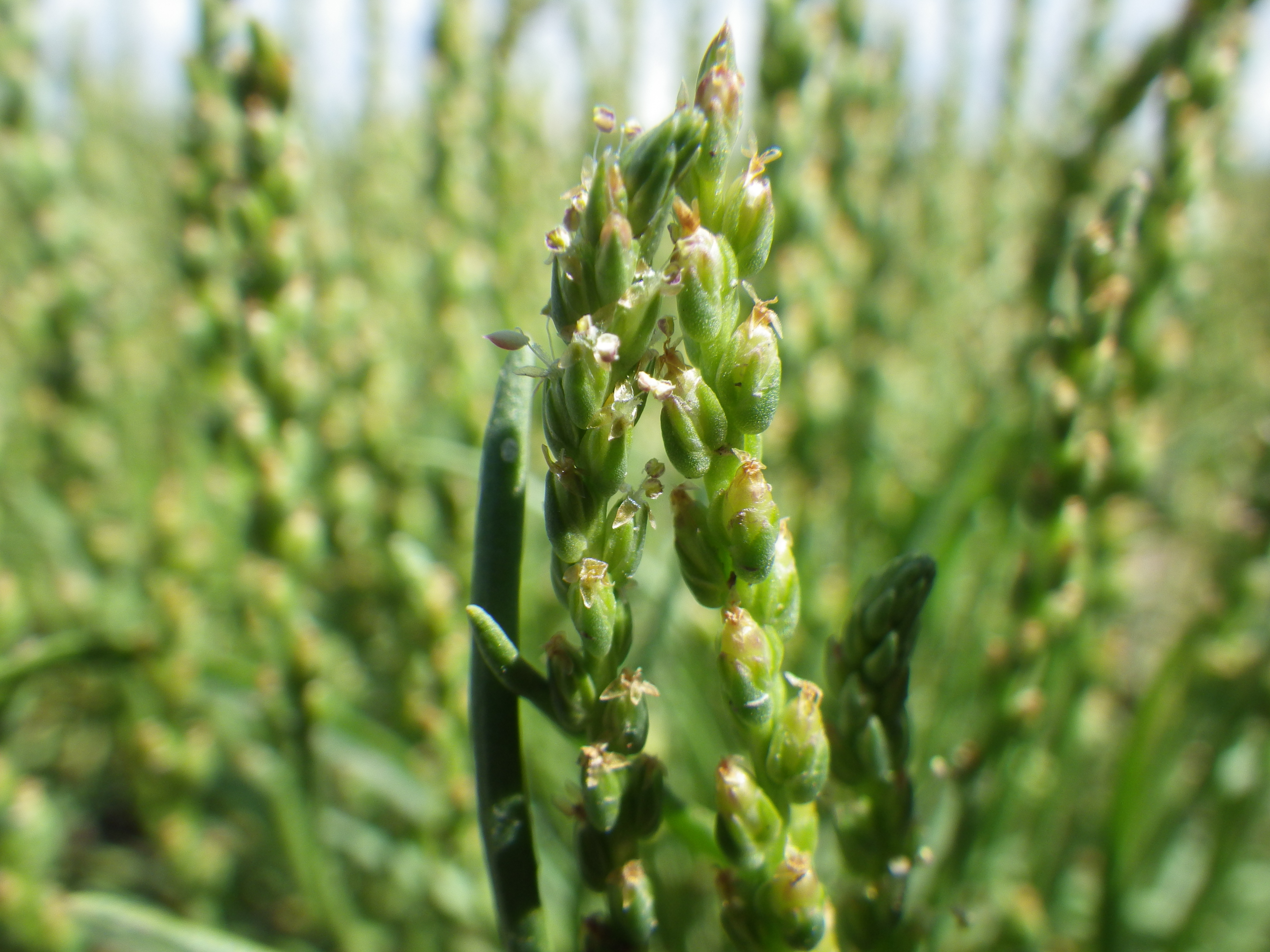
Plantago elongata, in Montana

== Description ==
Plantago elongata is a petite annual herb producing a few narrow linear or threadlike basal leaves up to 10 centimeters (3.9 in) long.

The stemlike inflorescences grow erect to a maximum height around 18 centimeters (7.1 in). Atop the peduncle of the inflorescence is a spike of several tiny flowers each with a rounded or oval calyx of sepals covered with thick, fleshy green bracts.

== Taxonomy ==
Plantago elongata was given its scientific name in 1813 by Frederick Traugott Pursh. It is classified in the genus Plantago as part of the Plantaginaceae family. It has no accepted subspecies or varieties, but has several among its eleven heterotypic synonyms.

Table of Synonyms
Name	Year	Rank
Plantago bigelovii A.Gray	1857	species
Plantago bigelovii subsp. californica (Greene) Bassett	1966	subspecies
Plantago californica Greene	1885	species
Plantago elongata var. bigelovii (A.Gray) B.Boivin	1972	variety
Plantago elongata var. californica (Greene) B.Boivin	1972	variety
Plantago elongata subsp. pentasperma Bassett	1966	subspecies
Plantago elongata var. pentasperma (Bassett) B.Boivin	1972	variety
Plantago hookeriana var. californica (Greene) Poe	1928	variety
Plantago linearifolia Muhl. ex Torr.	1824	species
Plantago myosuroides Rydb.	1900	species
Plantago patagonica var. rosulata Jeps.	1901	variety

== Range ==
Plantago elongata is native to Canada from British Colombia to Manitoba. In the United States it is native to the states west of Texas and North Dakota with the exception of Nevada, and also to the state of Minnesota. It is also native to the Mexican state of Chihuahua. It is an introduced species in South Africa.
