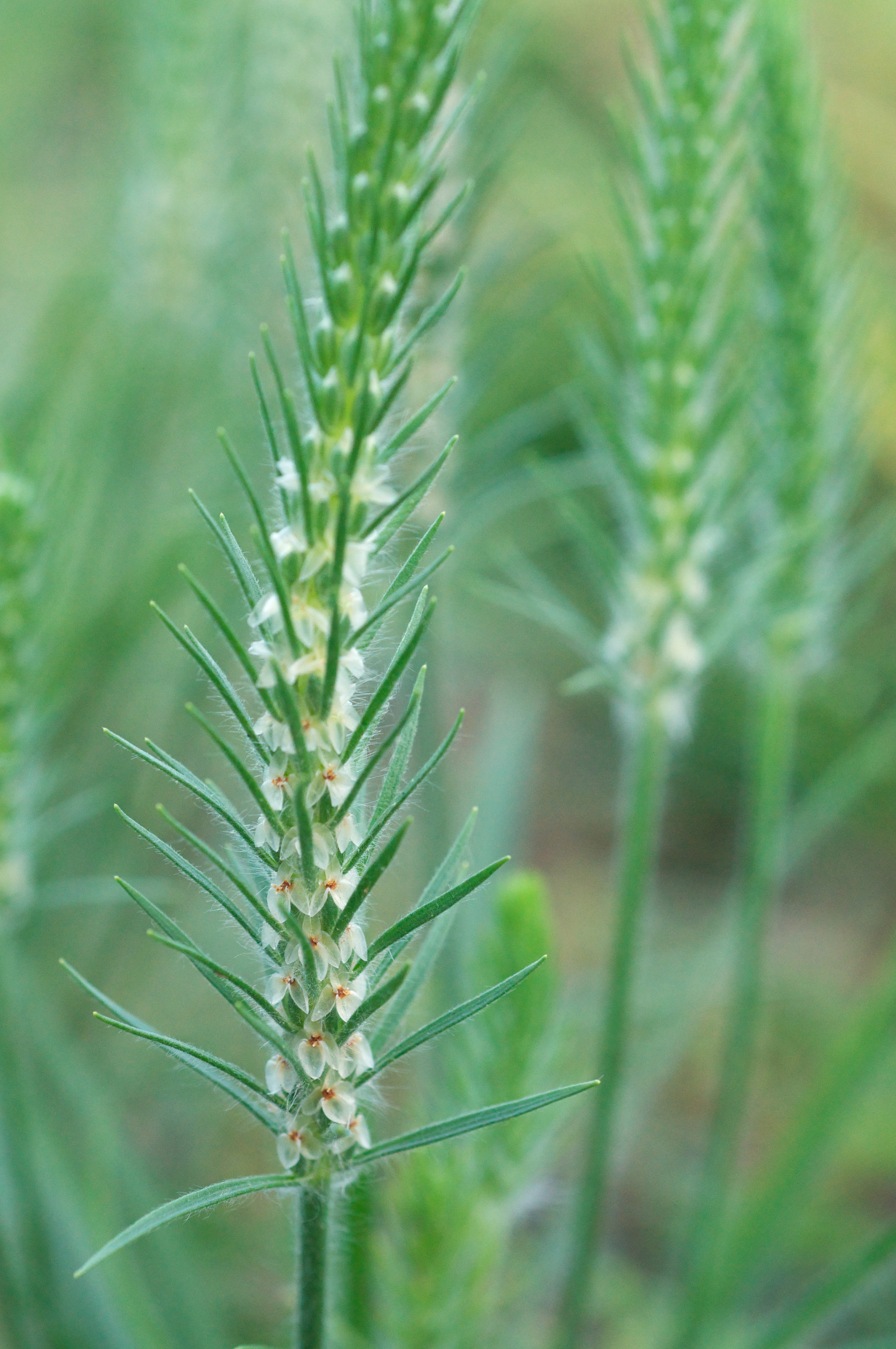

Scientific classification
- Kingdom: Plantae
- Clade: Embryophytes
- Clade: Tracheophytes
- Clade: Angiosperms
- Clade: Eudicots
- Clade: Asterids
- Order: Lamiales
- Family: Plantaginaceae
- Genus: Plantago
- Species: P. aristata

Binomial name
- Plantago aristata Michx.

= Plantago aristata =

Species of flowering plant in the plantain family

Plantago aristata is a species of plantain known by the common name bracted plantain or largebracted plantain. It is native to the eastern and central United States, and it can be found in other parts of North America as well as parts of Eurasia as an introduced species. It grows in many types of habitat, including disturbed areas, where it is a minor weed.

== Description ==
It is an annual herb usually lacking a stem, producing a circular rosette of many narrow linear leaves each up to 15 cm (5.9 in) long. The stemlike inflorescences grow erect to a maximum height around 30 to 35 cm (12 to 14 in) tall. Atop the peduncle of the inflorescence is a dense spike of many small flowers each with four whitish lobes a few millimeters long. Between the flowers are long, narrow bracts which may be 3 cm (1.2 in) long, the defining characteristic of the species. The bracts have fluffy hairs around their bases near the flowers.
