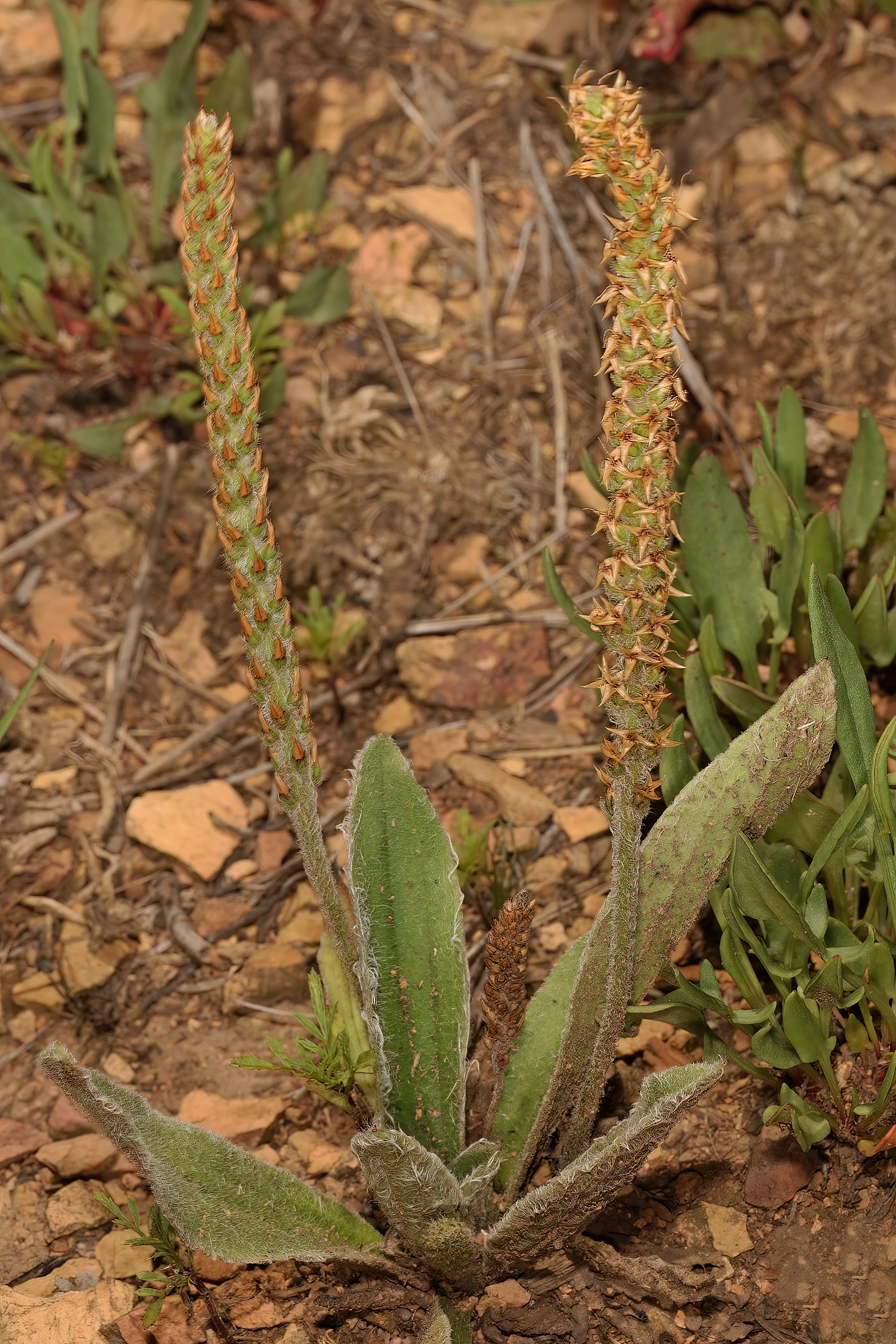

Scientific classification
- Kingdom: Plantae
- Clade: Tracheophytes
- Clade: Angiosperms
- Clade: Eudicots
- Clade: Asterids
- Order: Lamiales
- Family: Plantaginaceae
- Genus: Plantago
- Species: P. virginica

Binomial name
- Plantago virginica L.

= Plantago virginica =

Species of flowering plant

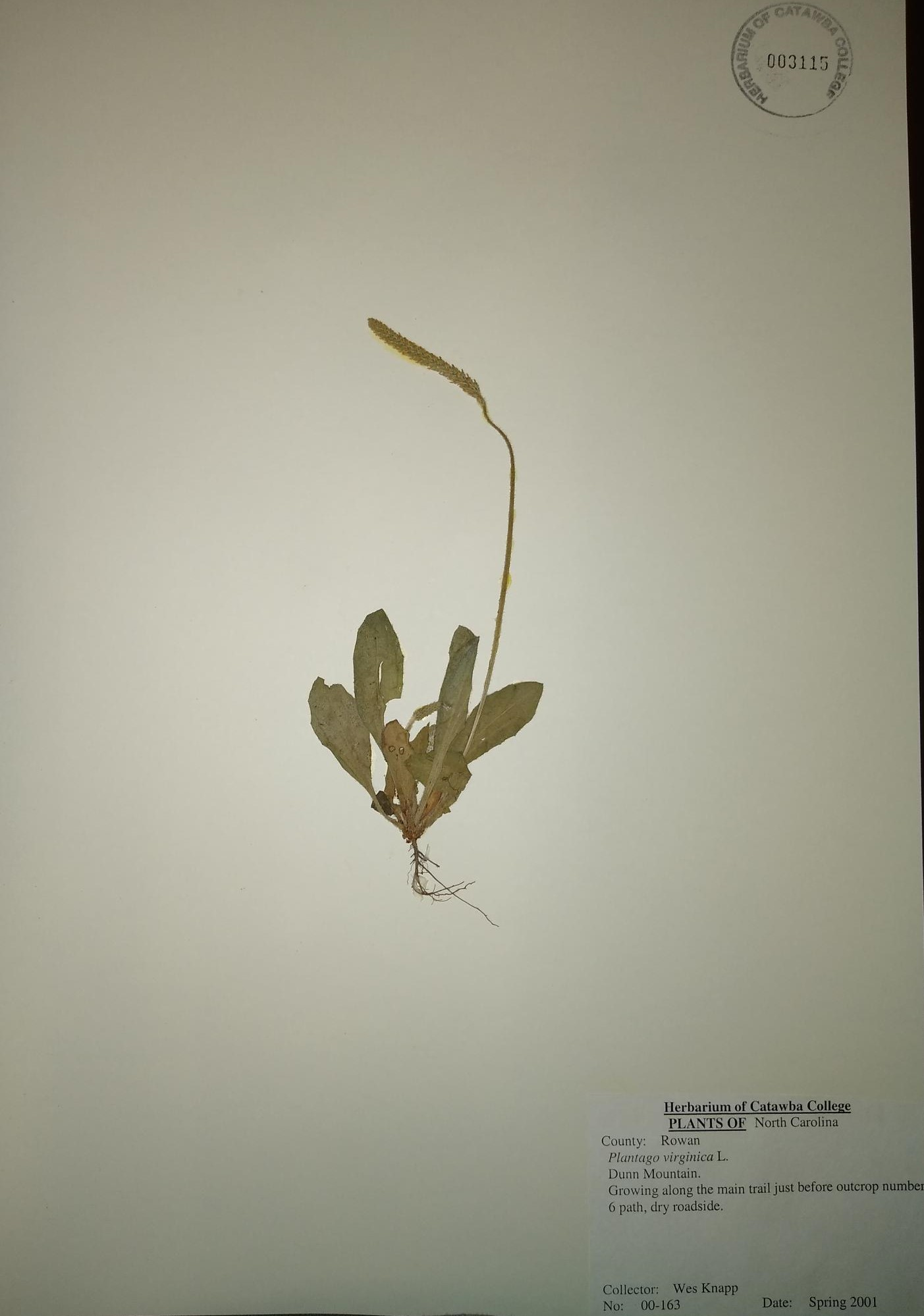
Plantago virginica specimen from the Catawba College Herbarium.

Plantago virginica, common names hoary plantain and Virginia plantain, is a species of plant native to North America and introduced in Asia. It is listed as a special concern in Connecticut. The Kiowa use it to make garlands or wreaths for old men to wear around their heads during ceremonial dances as a symbol of health. It is commonly found within the continental United States in the majority of states along coastal areas and on roads, though has become an invasive species to eastern China after its introduction c. 1980. It is an annual plant, blooming around the month of May.

== Description ==
Plantago virginica is an annual flowering plant that possesses both male and female flowers that are arranged on a spike. The entire plant is often covered in numerous tiny hairs that grow on both the leaves and stem. The leaves are reach between 2 and 15 centimeters in length and are 0.5 to 4 centimeters wide. The habit of P. virginica is low-lying, it grows close to the ground. The seeds of P. virginica are typically of a brown hue. Seeds are typically around 2mm wide in size. Plantago virginica usually to grow less than a thousand meters above sea level.

== Taxonomy ==
The word Plantago is derived from two root words. The first being the Latin word planta, which simply means "flat" and -ago, which refers to a semblance of. So it is in reference to the flat appearance of some of the leaves of species within the genus. Virginica is a word that is related to its provenance and is actually used for numerous species, plant or not. Examples include Crassotrea virginica, Elimia virginica, Itea virginica, and Iris virginica.

== Natural habitat ==
Plantago virginica is native to the southern and eastern states of the United States of America. While in these areas, it tends to prefer soil types with larger grains which limits the areas where it can take root. Plantago virginica can be found in and around most of the continental United States and into Canada.

== Invasive nature ==
In the 1980's Plantago virginica was introduced to China via trade where it has since become an invasive species. Since its introduction in China, P. virginica has begun to develop various traits which make it distinct from its North American variety. Extracts from the plant have impacted various lawn species resulting in phenomenon such as inhibited seed growth, altered growing patterns, and suppressing various mechanisms within co-occurring plants such as root growth. The extra nitrogen found within the soil has helped it thrive in the eastern Chinese environment, leading to a larger general biomass than plants in the United States. Plantago virginica has also begun to out compete local species such as Plantago asiatica due to allocations towards reproduction rather than towards vegetative growth. As a result, P. virginica has been reproducing higher rates than P. asiatica. Plantago virginica has also spread diseases to local plants and is considered a weed of crops.

The invasive population of Plantago virginica has developed several differences from its US phenotype. The Chinese population of the P. virginica tends to germinate before native North American species, but develop reproductive parts such as seeds after the native plant. Furthermore, introduced populations have less phenotypic diversity than native North American selections of P. virginica. Invasive populations of P. virginica also remain dormant in the soil for shorter durations relative to native North American populations.

== Culture ==
Plantago virginica tends to grow in areas with loose and disturbed soil. It tends to prefer disturbed locations such as ditches on the sides of roads, gravely patches, and similar locations. Plantago virginica often blooms around the month of May and is considered a spring plant.

== Interactions with animals ==
Plantago virginica can be a food source for small insects such as beetles and weevils. Plantago virginica (as well as other Plantago species) has been found to be dispersed into environments via horse dung and survive through the horse digestive system, allowing it to be dispersed over long ranges. Laws prohibiting horse riding in an area, can have an impact on this form of dispersal.
