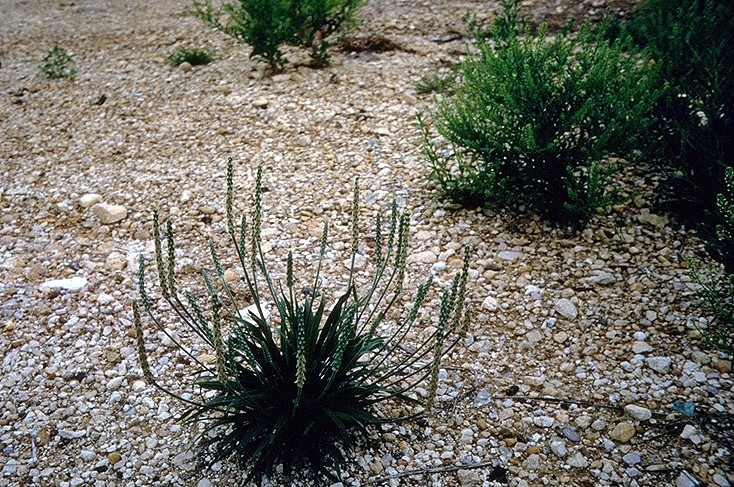

Scientific classification
- Kingdom: Plantae
- Clade: Embryophytes
- Clade: Tracheophytes
- Clade: Angiosperms
- Clade: Eudicots
- Clade: Asterids
- Order: Lamiales
- Family: Plantaginaceae
- Genus: Plantago
- Species: P. rhodosperma

Binomial name
- Plantago rhodosperma Decne.

Synonyms
- Plantago echioides Decne. Plantago rhodosperma var. echioides (Decne.) Pilg. Plantago rhodosperma var. macrocalyx Pilg. Plantago rubra A.M.Cunn. Plantago virginica var. pectinata Kuntze

= Plantago rhodosperma =

Species of flowering plant in the plantain family

Plantago rhodosperma is a species of flowering plant in the plantain family known by the common names redseed plantain and redseed indianwheat. It is native to the Great Plains and Southwest of the United States.

This species is an annual herb growing from a taproot. The leaves are lance-shaped and may reach 35 cm (14 in) long, but are usually smaller. The leaves are gray-green and lightly hairy. The inflorescence is a narrow spike up to 20 cm (7.9 in) long. Each small flower produces two red or reddish black seeds.

This species is planted to provide a forage and to revegetate wildlife habitat and rangeland. The seed provides food for many types of game birds and the foliage is consumed by several types of animals, such as deer.
