= Plantago helleri =

Scientific classification
- Kingdom: Plantae
- Clade: Tracheophytes
- Clade: Angiosperms
- Clade: Eudicots
- Clade: Asterids
- Order: Lamiales
- Family: Plantaginaceae
- Genus: Plantago
- Species: P. helleri

Binomial name
- Plantago helleri Small

Species of plant

Plantago helleri, the cedar plantain or Heller's plantain, is a species of flowering plant in the family Plantaginaceae, native to New Mexico, Texas, and northeastern Mexico. It is an annual reaching 30 cm (1 ft).
