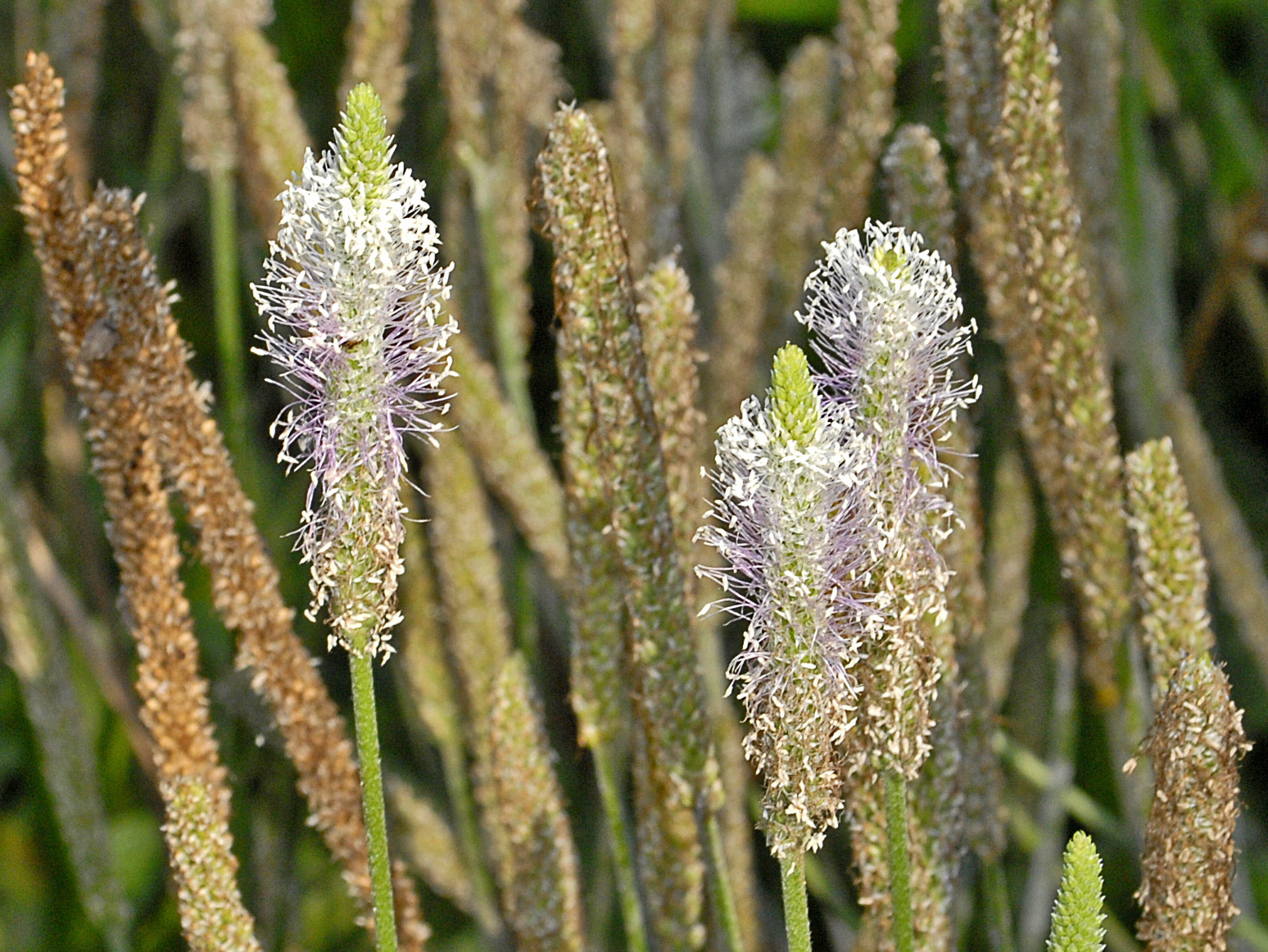
- Plantago holosteum at the Civico Orto Botanico di Trieste

Scientific classification
- Kingdom: Plantae
- Clade: Tracheophytes
- Clade: Angiosperms
- Clade: Eudicots
- Clade: Asterids
- Order: Lamiales
- Family: Plantaginaceae
- Genus: Plantago
- Species: P. holosteum

Binomial name
- Plantago holosteum Scop.

Synonyms
- Plantago carinata Schrad.; Plantago recurvata Auct. non L.; Plantago acanthophylla Decne.; Plantago capitellata DC.; Plantago subulata subsp. holosteum (Scop.) O. Bolòs & Vigo

= Plantago holosteum =

Species of flowering plant in the plantain family

Plantago holosteum is an annual plant of the family Plantaginaceae and the genus Plantago.

== Description ==
Plantago holosteum grows to 15–40 centimetres (5.9–15.7 in) in height. The flowering period extends from May to June.

== Distribution and habitat ==
This species is native to Southern Europe and parts of the Middle East and Northwest Africa. It prefers dry grasslands, arid and sunny grassy areas on carbonate substrates, at an elevation of 0–1,300 metres (0–4,265 ft) above sea level.
