= Plantago hawaiensis =

Conservation status
- Critically Imperiled (NatureServe)

Scientific classification
- Kingdom: Plantae
- Clade: Tracheophytes
- Clade: Angiosperms
- Clade: Eudicots
- Clade: Asterids
- Order: Lamiales
- Family: Plantaginaceae
- Genus: Plantago
- Species: P. hawaiensis

Binomial name
- Plantago hawaiensis (A.Gray) Pilg.

Species of flowering plant in the plantain family

Plantago hawaiensis is a rare species of flowering plant in the plantain family known by the common name Hawaiian plantain. It is endemic to Hawaii, where it is known only from the island of Hawaii. It grows on the slopes of Mauna Loa and Hualalai. Like other Hawaiian Plantago, it is known as kuahiwi laukahi. It is a federally listed endangered species of the United States.

This is a perennial herb with a woolly stem growing a few centimeters tall and bearing spikes of flowers. It grows in bogs and forested habitat on lava and volcanic ash substrates. There are about five occurrences of the plant remaining for an estimated total of just over 5000 individuals.
