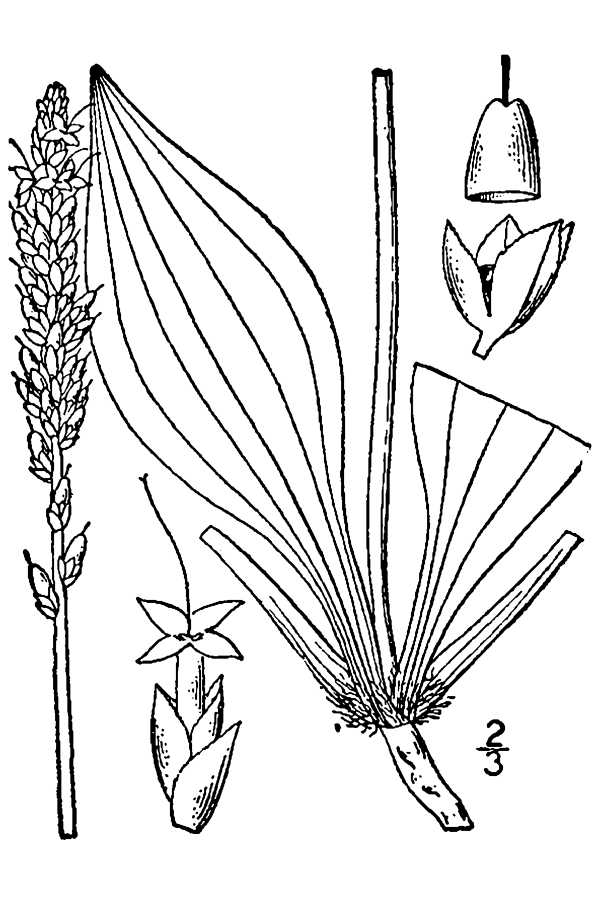

Conservation status
- Secure (NatureServe)

Scientific classification
- Kingdom: Plantae
- Clade: Tracheophytes
- Clade: Angiosperms
- Clade: Eudicots
- Clade: Asterids
- Order: Lamiales
- Family: Plantaginaceae
- Genus: Plantago
- Species: P. eriopoda

Binomial name
- Plantago eriopoda Torr.

= Plantago eriopoda =

Plant species in the veronica family

Plantago eriopoda is a species of plantain known by the common name redwool plantain. It is native to much of western and central North America from Alaska to the southwestern United States to the Great Lakes region, where it can be found in moist and wet habitat types, sometimes in alkaline soils. It is a perennial herb producing a clump of lance-shaped to narrow oval leaves up to 25 centimeters long. The leaves may have slightly toothed edges and often have a coating of woolly red hairs near their bases. The stemlike inflorescences grow erect to a maximum height near half a meter. Atop the peduncle of the inflorescence is a dense cylindrical spike of many tiny flowers. Each flower has a whitish corolla with four lobes each about a millimeter long accompanied by sepals covered with small bracts.

== Taxonomy ==
Plantago eriopoda was scientifically described and named by John Torrey in 1827. It is part of the genus Plantago which is classified in the Plantaginaceae family. It has no accepted forms, but three have been described that are heterotypic synonyms along with seven other taxa.

Table of Synonyms
Name	Year	Rank	Notes
Plantago attenuata E.James	1823	species	nom. illeg.
Plantago cucullata Pursh	1813	species	nom. illeg.
Plantago eriopoda f. angustior Pilg.	1937	form	
Plantago eriopoda f. latior Pilg.	1937	form	
Plantago eriopoda f. maxima Pilg.	1937	form	
Plantago glabra Nutt.	1818	species	
Plantago lanceolata var. latifolia Hook.	1838	variety	
Plantago oblongifolia Decne.	1852	species	
Plantago retrorsa Greene	1901	species	
Plantago shastensis Greene	1901	species	
Plantago virescens Barnéoud	1845	species	
