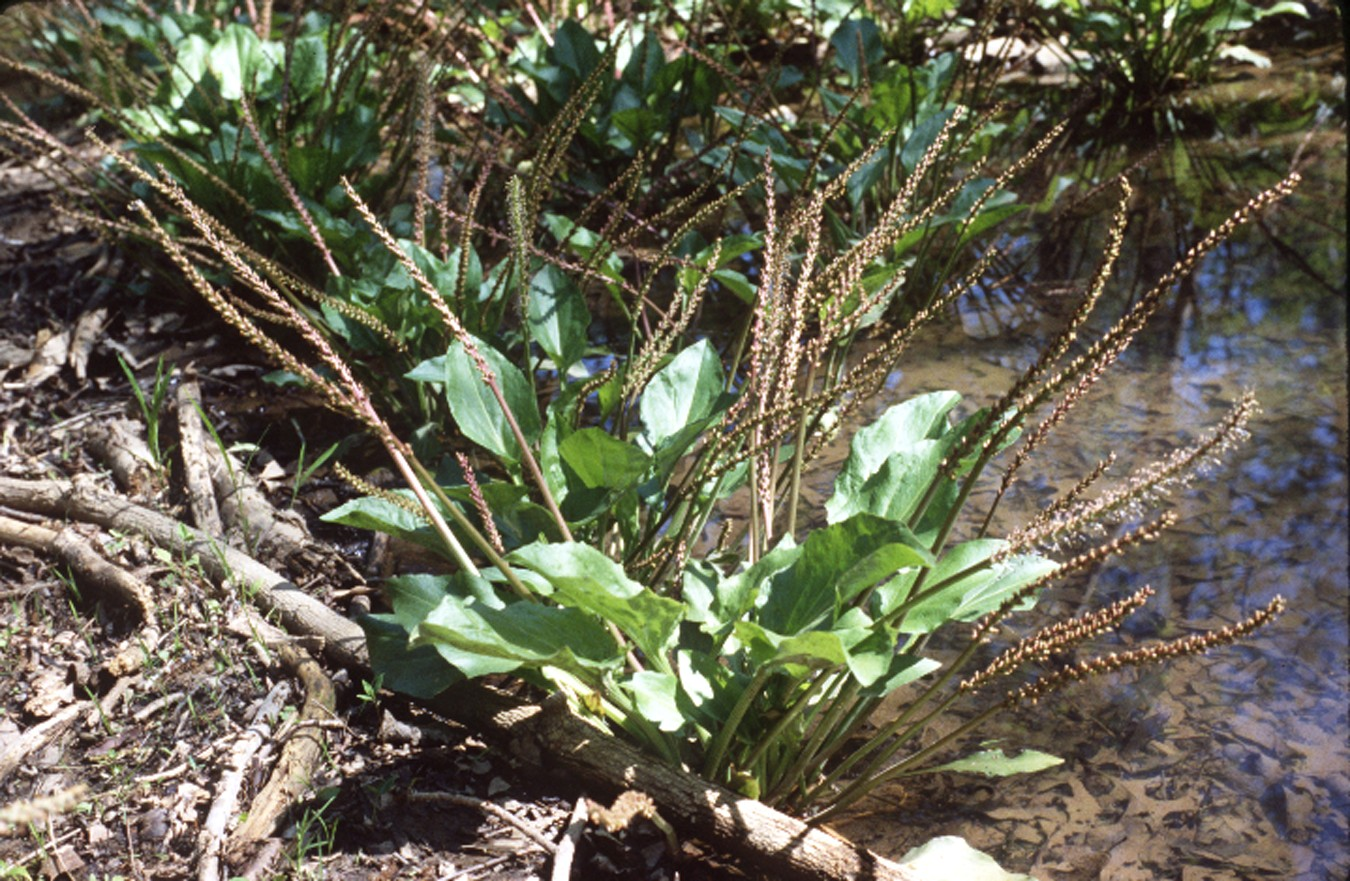

Conservation status
- Apparently Secure (NatureServe)

Scientific classification
- Kingdom: Plantae
- Clade: Embryophytes
- Clade: Tracheophytes
- Clade: Angiosperms
- Clade: Eudicots
- Clade: Asterids
- Order: Lamiales
- Family: Plantaginaceae
- Genus: Plantago
- Species: P. cordata

Binomial name
- Plantago cordata Lam.

= Plantago cordata =

Species of flowering plant in the plantain family

Plantago cordata is a species of flowering plant in the plantain family known by the common name heartleaf plantain. It is native to eastern North America, where it is distributed throughout eastern Canada and the eastern United States. Though it has a wide distribution, it is very localized, and populations have declined almost everywhere.

== Background ==
This type of perennial plant grows up to half a meter tall. The fleshy leaf blades are oval to heart-shaped and borne on long petioles. The plant produces smaller leaves during the winter, and larger ones during the summer. The inflorescence arises on a hollow stem and contains many flowers. Each flower has four petals and four sepals. The flowering stalks can grow up to 30 centimeters (12 in) in one week. The fruit is a capsule about half a centimeter long. The capsule usually contains two seeds. The seeds are adapted for water dispersal, with buoyant fleshy parts and a sticky substance that causes them to adhere to objects.

This semi-aquatic plant can be found growing in and around running water bodies such as streams and creeks. It is most often found on dolomite. It can be found on the banks of the Hudson River in New York. It belongs to a number of plant communities and grows in several habitat types.

This species "has the lowest reproductive output of all plantain species."

This species has declined mainly because of urbanization. Its distribution has not narrowed, but so many populations have disappeared that the plant is "at considerable risk of extinction."
