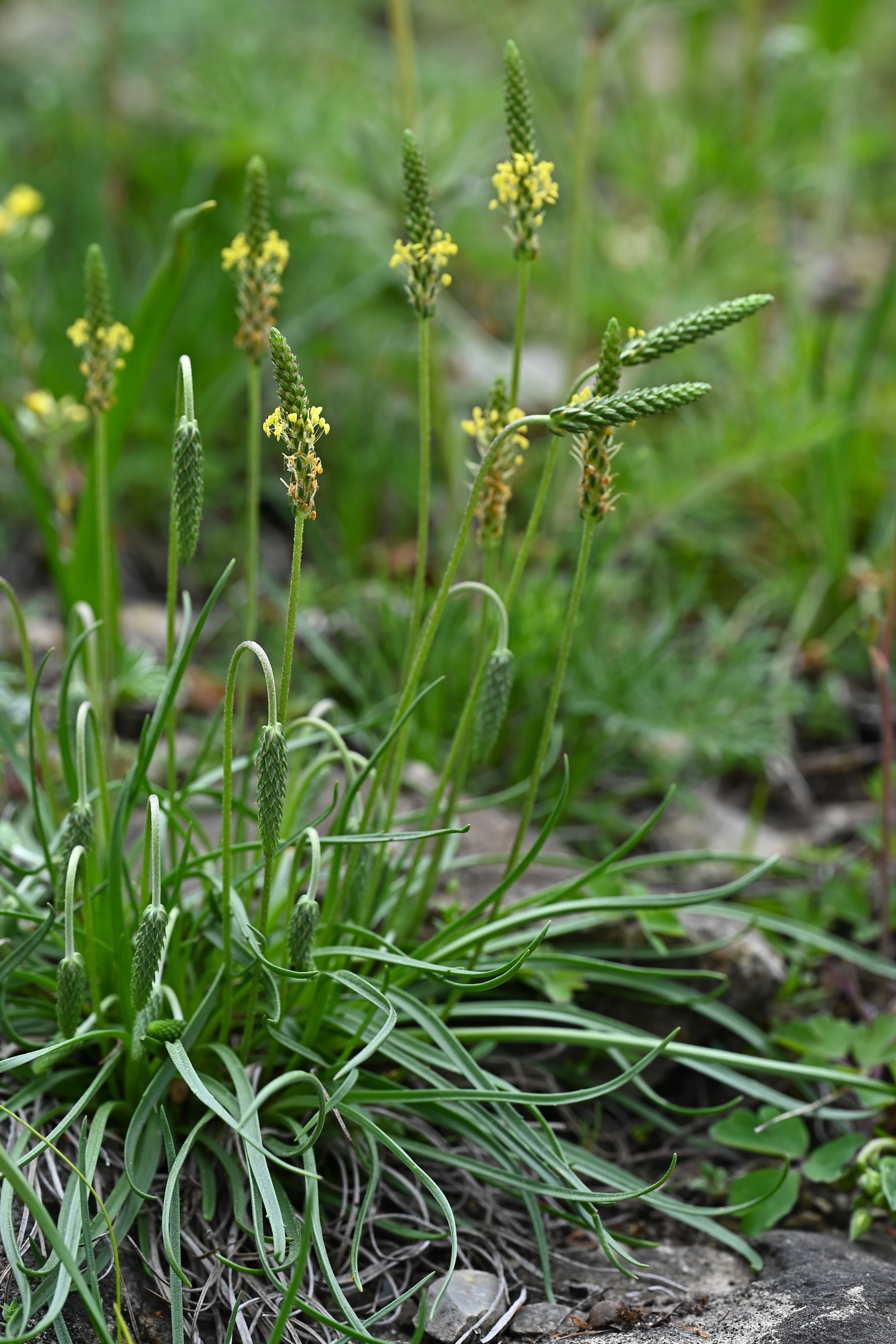

Scientific classification
- Kingdom: Plantae
- Clade: Embryophytes
- Clade: Tracheophytes
- Clade: Spermatophytes
- Clade: Angiosperms
- Clade: Eudicots
- Clade: Asterids
- Order: Lamiales
- Family: Plantaginaceae
- Genus: Plantago
- Species: P. alpina

Binomial name
- Plantago alpina L.

Synonyms
- List: Plantago ovina Vill.; Plantago incana Ramond ex DC.; Plantago bidentata Murith; Arnoglossum alpinum (L.) Gray; Plantago alpina var. incana (Ramond ex DC.) Mert. & W.D.J.Koch; Plantago bidentata var. angustifolia Gaudin; Plantago bidentata f. humilis Gaudin; Plantago cinerascens Ser. ex Barnéoud; Plantago carinata var. depauperata Godr.; Plantago alpina var. eriopoda Willk.; Plantaginella alpina (L.) Fourr.; Plantago maritima var. alpina (L.) Bég.; Plantago penyalarensis Pau; Plantago holosteum var. depauperata (Godr.) Pilg.; Plantago alpina var. numantina Pau ex C.Vicioso; Plantago alpina subsp. penyalarensis (Pau) Rivas Mart.; Plantago alpina f. eriopoda (Willk.) Rivas Mart., Izco & M.J.Costa; Plantago maritima subsp. alpina (L.) O.Bolòs & Vigo; Plantago subulata var. depauperata (Godr.) O.Bolòs & Vigo; Plantago alpina subsp. incana (Ramond ex DC.) Chrtek

= Plantago alpina =

Species of plant

Plantago alpina, commonly known as alpine plantain, is a species of plant native to Europe.
