= Plantago rigida =

Scientific classification
- Kingdom: Plantae
- Clade: Tracheophytes
- Clade: Angiosperms
- Clade: Eudicots
- Clade: Asterids
- Order: Lamiales
- Family: Plantaginaceae
- Genus: Plantago
- Species: P. rigida

Binomial name
- Plantago rigida Kunth

Species of flowering plant in the plantain family

Plantago rigida, colloquially known as "Colchón de agua" (water mattress), is a species of flowering plant in the plantain family found in the high-altitude páramo biome of South America.

== Distribution ==
Bolivia, Colombia, Ecuador, Peru, Venezuela.
