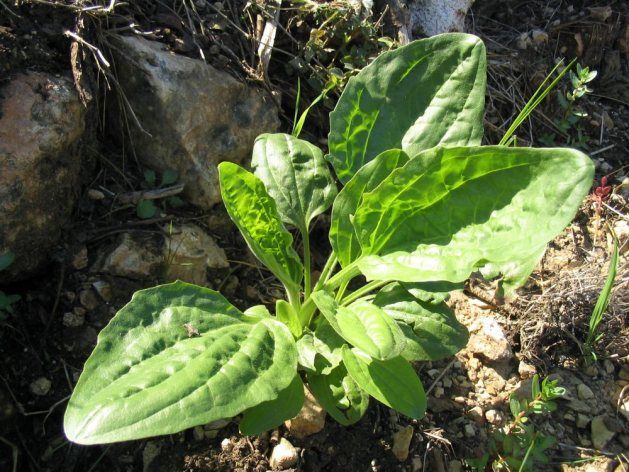
- Greater plantain (Plantago major)

Scientific classification
- Kingdom: Plantae
- Clade: Tracheophytes
- Clade: Angiosperms
- Clade: Eudicots
- Clade: Asterids
- Order: Lamiales
- Family: Plantaginaceae
- Tribe: Plantagineae
- Genus: Plantago; L.

Subgenera
- Plantago; Coronopus; Bougeria; Psyllium; Littorella

Synonyms
- Psyllium Mill.

= Plantago =

Genus of flowering plants

Plantago is a genus of about 200 species of flowering plants in the family Plantaginaceae, commonly called plantains or fleaworts. The common name plantain is shared with the unrelated cooking plantain. Most are herbaceous plants, though a few are subshrubs growing to 60 centimetres (24 inches) tall.

== Description ==
The leaves are sessile or have a poorly defined petiole. They have three or five parallel veins that diverge in the wider part of the leaf. Leaves are broad or narrow, depending on the species. The inflorescences are borne on stalks typically 5–40 centimetres (2–15 1/2 inches) tall, and can be a short cone or a long spike, with numerous tiny wind-pollinated flowers.

== Species ==
The boundaries of the genus Plantago have been fairly stable, with the main question being whether to include Bougueria (one species from the Andes) and Littorella (2–3 species of aquatic plants).

There are about 200 species of Plantago, including:

- Plantago afra
- Plantago africana
- Plantago aitchisonii
- Plantago alpina
- Plantago amplexicaulis
- Plantago arborescens
- Plantago arenaria—Branched plantain
- Plantago argentea
- Plantago aristata—Bracted plantain, largebracted plantain
- Plantago asiatica—Chinese plantain, obako, arnoglossa
- Plantago aucklandica
- Plantago australis
- Plantago bigelovii
- Plantago canescens
- Plantago cladarophylla
- Plantago coreana
- Plantago cordata—Heartleaf plantain
- Plantago coronopus—Buckshorn plantain
- Plantago cornuti
- Plantago cretica
- Plantago cynops
- Plantago debilis—Shade plantain, weak plantain
- Plantago elongata—Prairie plantain, slender plantain
- Plantago erecta—California plantain, foothill plantain, dot-seed plantain, English plantain, dwarf plantain
- Plantago eriopoda—Redwool plantain
- Plantago erosa
- Plantago fernandezia
- Plantago fischeri
- Plantago gentianoides
- Plantago glabrifolia
- Plantago grayana
- Plantago gunnii - bolster plantain or bolster plantago
- Plantago hawaiensis—Hawaiian plantain
- Plantago hedleyi
- Plantago helleri—Heller's plantain
- Plantago heterophylla
- Plantago hillebrandii
- Plantago himalaica
- Plantago holosteum
- Plantago hookeriana—Hookers plantain, tallow weed, California plantain
- Plantago incisa
- Plantago indica
- Plantago krajinai
- Plantago lagopus—Hare's foot plantain
- Plantago lanceolata—Ribwort plantain
- Plantago lanigera
- Plantago leiopetala—Madeira plantain
- Plantago longissima
- Plantago macrocarpa
- Plantago major—Greater plantain, common plantain
- Plantago maritima—Sea plantain
- Plantago maxima
- Plantago media—Hoary plantain
- Plantago melanochrous
- Plantago moorei—Moore's plantain
- Plantago musicola
- Plantago nivalis
- Plantago novae-zelandiae
- Plantago nubicola (also known as Bougueria nubicola)
- Plantago obconica
- Plantago ovata—Indian wheat, blond psyllium
- Plantago pachyphylla
- Plantago palustris
- Plantago palmata
- Plantago patagonica—Woolly plantain
- Plantago picta
- Plantago polysperma
- Plantago princeps
- Plantago purshii—Woolly plantain
- Plantago pusilla
- Plantago psyllium—Sand plantain, French or dark psyllium
- Plantago raoulii
- Plantago rapensis
- Plantago remota
- Plantago reniformis
- Plantago rhodosperma—Redseed plantain, redseed indianwheat
- Plantago rigida
- Plantago robusta
- Plantago rugelii—Blackseed plantain
- Plantago rupicola
- Plantago schneideri
- Plantago sempervirens
- Plantago sparsiflora
- Plantago spathulata
- Plantago subnuda—Tall coastal plantain
- Plantago tanalensis
- Plantago taqueti
- Plantago tenuiflora
- Plantago triandra
- Plantago triantha
- Plantago tweedyi
- Plantago udicola
- Plantago unibracteata
- Plantago virginica—Virginia plantain, paleseed plantain
- Plantago winteri
- Plantago wrightiana—Wright's plantain

=== Etymology ===
The genus name Plantago descends from the classical Latin name plantago, which in classical Latin meant some Plantago species, including Plantago major and Plantago media. In Latin the name was formed from the classical Latin word planta = "sole of the foot". The name was so formed in Latin because the leaves of these species grow out near flat at ground level. The suffix -ago in Latin means "a sort of".

== Distribution and habitat ==
The species are found all over the world, including the Americas, Asia, Australia, New Zealand, Africa and Europe. Many species in the genus are cosmopolitan weeds. They are found in many different habitats, most commonly in wet areas like seepages or bogs. They can also be found in alpine and semi-alpine or coastal areas. The cosmopolitan weeds can be frequently seen at the side of roads.

== Ecology ==
Plantains are used as food plants by the larvae of some species of Lepidoptera (butterfly and moth).

== Uses ==
Plantain has been consumed as human food since prehistory. For example, archaeological recovery along California's Central Coast has demonstrated use of this species as a food since the Millingstone Horizon. The broad-leaved varieties are sometimes used as a leaf vegetable for salads, green sauce, and so on. Tender young plantain leaves can be eaten raw and older leaves can be cooked. The seeds can be cooked like rice.

Plantago species have been used since prehistoric times as herbal remedies. The herb is astringent, anti-toxic, antimicrobial, anti-inflammatory, anti-histamine, as well as demulcent, expectorant, styptic and diuretic. Externally, a poultice of the leaves is useful for insect bites, poison-ivy rashes, minor sores, and boils. In folklore it is even claimed to be able to cure snakebite and was used by the Dakota tribe of North America for this. Internally, it is used for coughs and bronchitis, as a tea, tincture, or syrup. Tea made from the leaves may help cure diarrhea.

Plantain seed husks expand and become mucilaginous when wet, especially those of P. psyllium, which is used in common over-the-counter bulk laxative and fiber supplement products such as Metamucil. P. psyllium seed is useful for constipation, irritable bowel syndrome, dietary fiber supplementation, and diverticular disease. Mucilage from desert indianwheat (P. ovata) is obtained by grinding off the husk. This mucilage, also known as psyllium, is commonly sold as Isabgol, a laxative which is used to control irregular bowel syndrome and constipation. It has been used as an indigenous Ayurvedic and Unani medicine for a whole range of bowel problems. Psyllium supplements are typically used in powder form, along with adequate amounts of fluids. A dose of at least 7 grams daily taken with adequate amounts of fluid (water, juice) is used by some for management of elevated cholesterol. There are a number of psyllium products used for constipation. The usual dose is about 3.5 grams twice a day. Psyllium is also a component of several ready-to-eat cereals.

In Serbia, Romania, Bulgaria and Russia, leaves from Plantago major are used as a folk remedy to preventing infection on cuts and scratches because of its antiseptic properties. In Slovenia and other Central European regions, the leaves were traditionally used topically as a cure for blisters resulting from friction (such as caused by tight shoes etc.).

There may also be a use for plantains in the abatement of enteric methane from ruminants, as the natural compounds present (e.g. condensed tannins; ~14 g/kg DM), affect the acetate-propionate ratio in the rumen, which is a primary mechanism by which methanogenesis is restricted. Currently this is not a viable option in any significant scale due to agronomic difficulties.

== Culture ==
As Old English Wegbrade the plantago is one of the nine plants invoked in the pagan Anglo-Saxon Nine Herbs Charm, recorded in the 10th century.

== Gallery ==
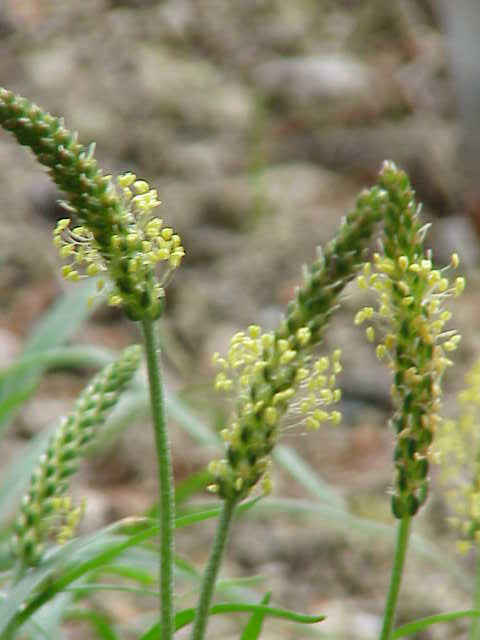
Plantago alpina

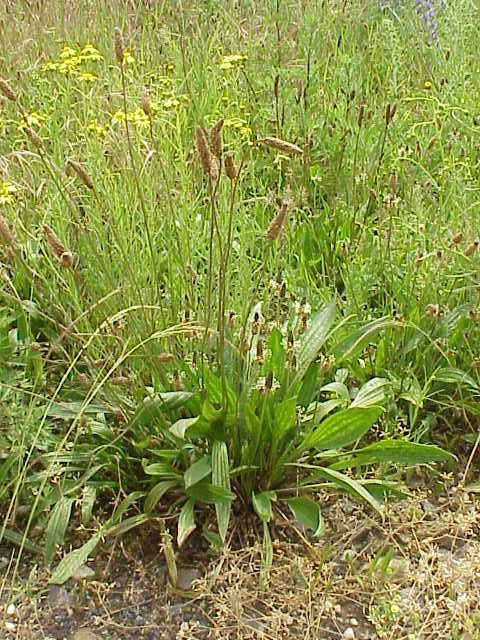
Ribwort plantain (Plantago lanceolata)

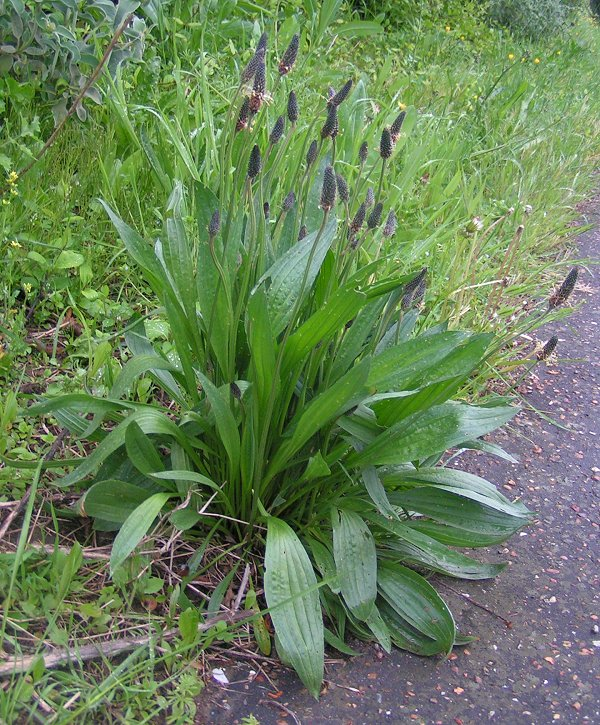
Ribwort plantain (Plantago lanceolata)

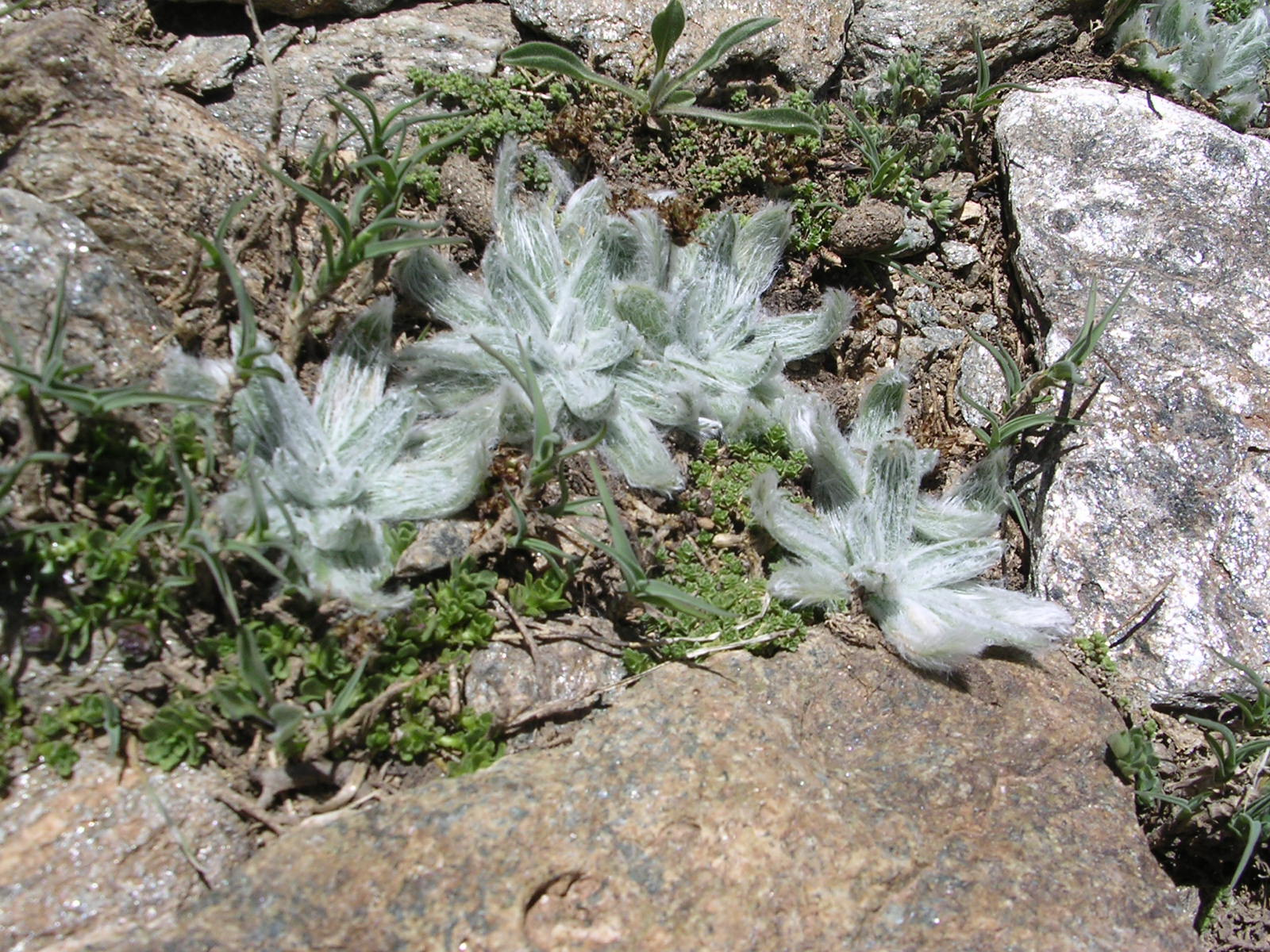
Plantago nivalis

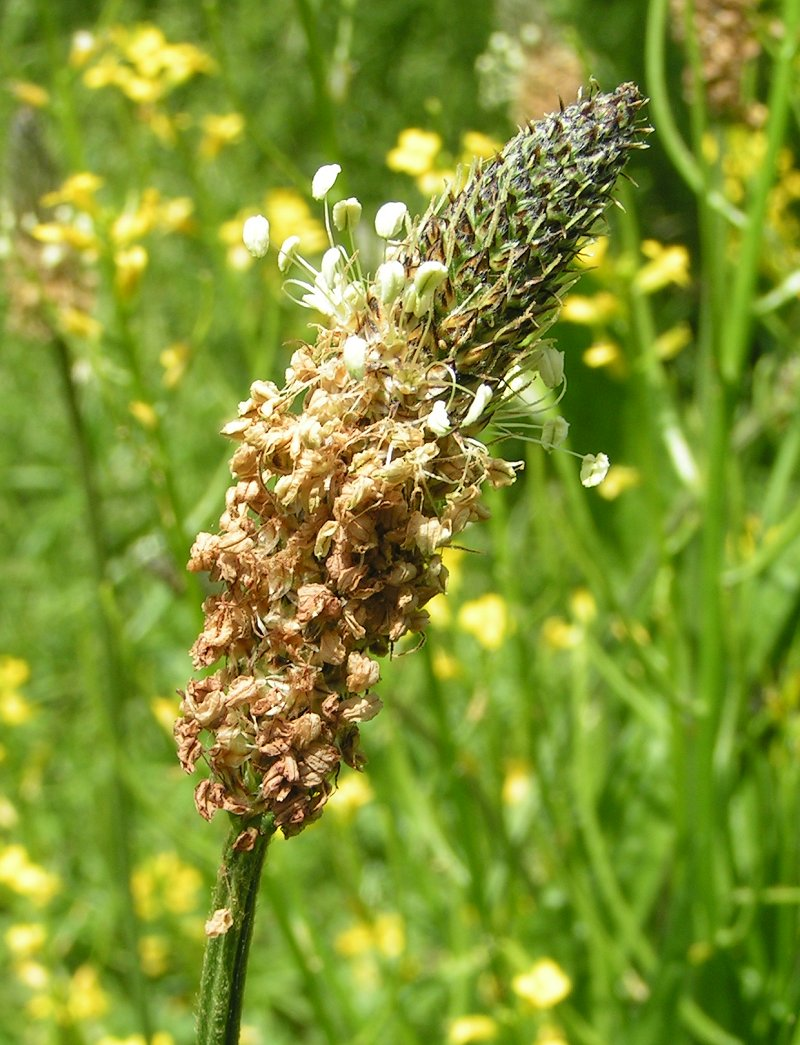
Ribwort plantain flower spike

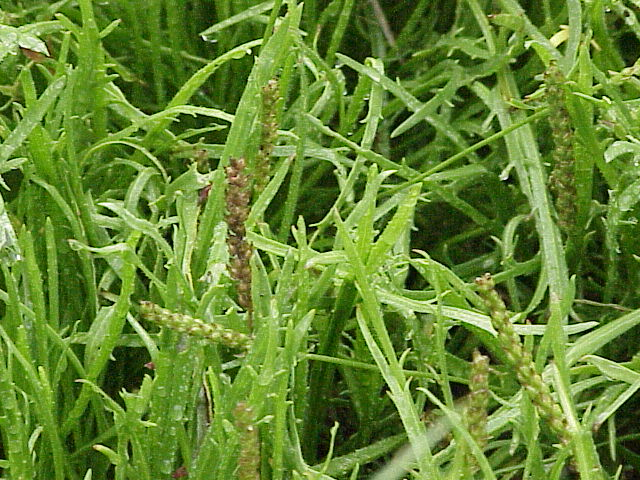
Buckshorn plantain (Plantago coronopus)

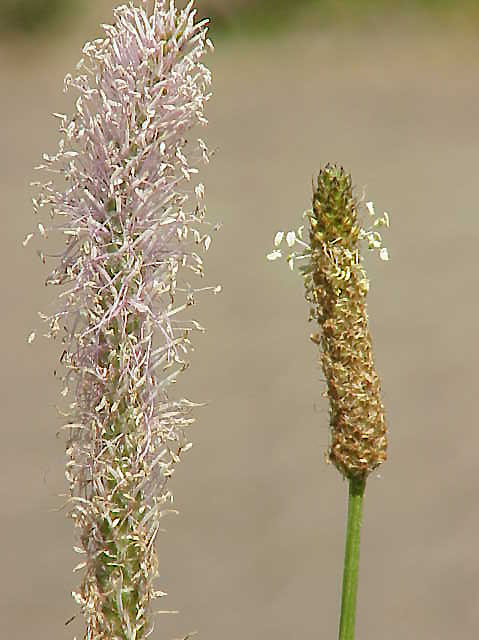
Plantago media stepposa

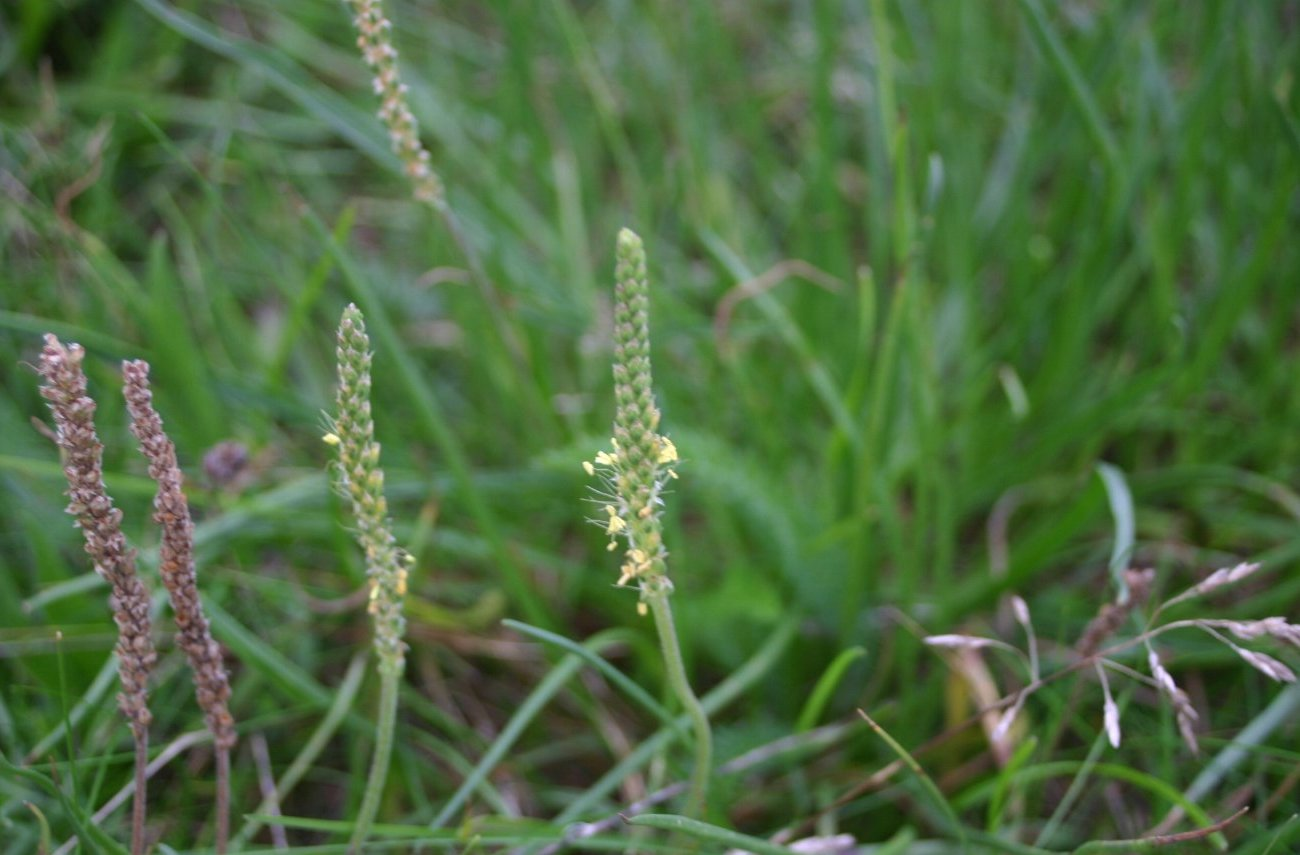
Plantago maritima
