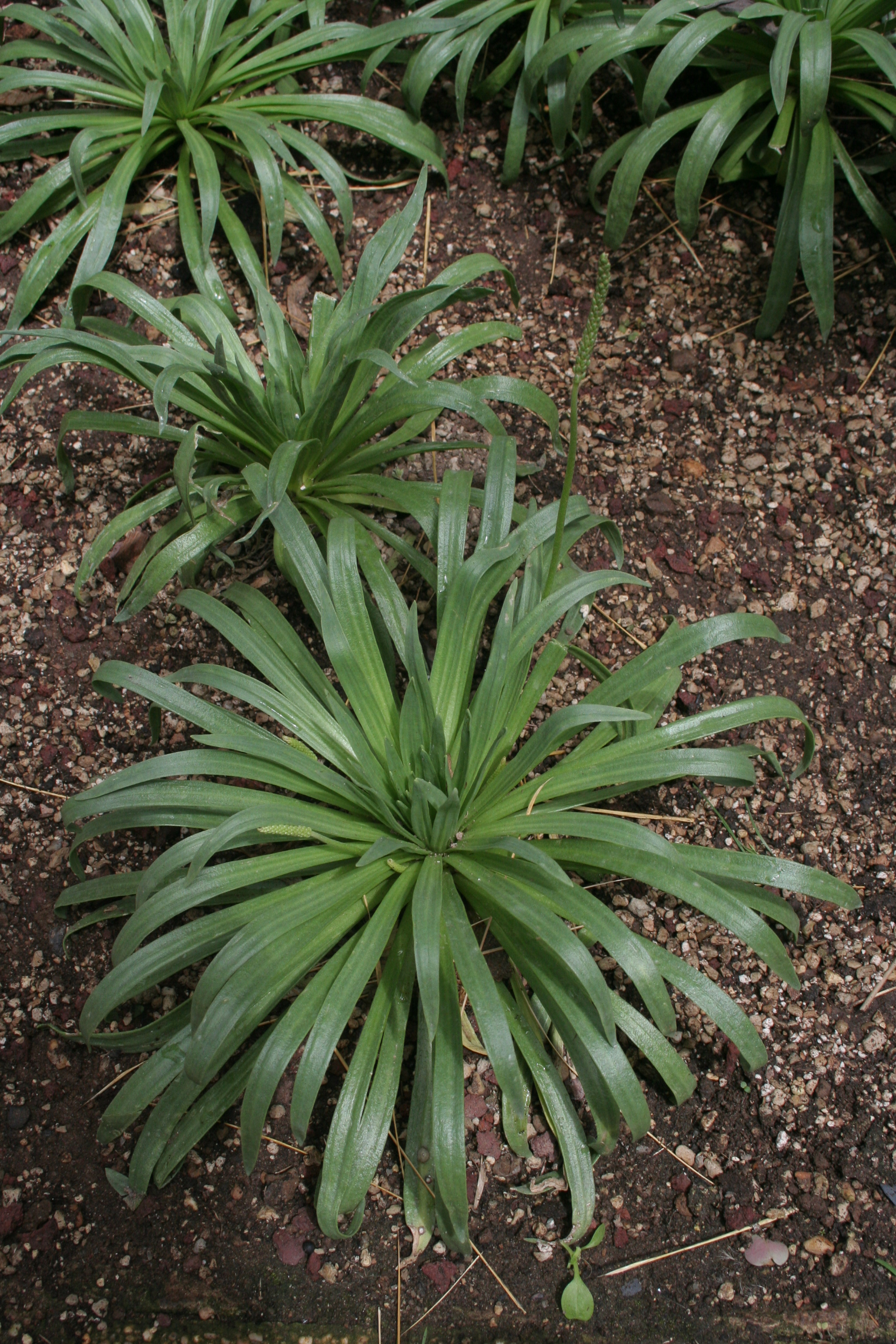

Conservation status
- Critically Endangered (IUCN 3.1)

Scientific classification
- Kingdom: Plantae
- Clade: Embryophytes
- Clade: Tracheophytes
- Clade: Spermatophytes
- Clade: Angiosperms
- Clade: Eudicots
- Clade: Asterids
- Order: Lamiales
- Family: Plantaginaceae
- Genus: Plantago
- Species: P. robusta

Binomial name
- Plantago robusta Roxb.

= Plantago robusta =

Species of plant

Plantago robusta, commonly known as the St Helena plantain, is a flowering plant in the family Plantaginaceae. It is a subshrub endemic to Saint Helena.

It is classified as critically endangered by the International Union for Conservation of Nature.

== Distribution ==
It is found in Saint Helena.

== Taxonomy ==
It was described by William Roxburgh in Tracts St. Helena: 317 in 1816.
