= Plantago moorei =

Conservation status
- Endangered (IUCN 3.1)

Scientific classification
- Kingdom: Plantae
- Clade: Embryophytes
- Clade: Tracheophytes
- Clade: Angiosperms
- Clade: Eudicots
- Clade: Asterids
- Order: Lamiales
- Family: Plantaginaceae
- Genus: Plantago
- Species: P. moorei

Binomial name
- Plantago moorei Rahn

Species of flowering plant in the plantain family

Plantago moorei, also called Moore's plantain, is a species of plant in the family Plantaginaceae. It is endemic to Falkland Islands. Its natural habitat is temperate shrubland. It is threatened by habitat loss.
