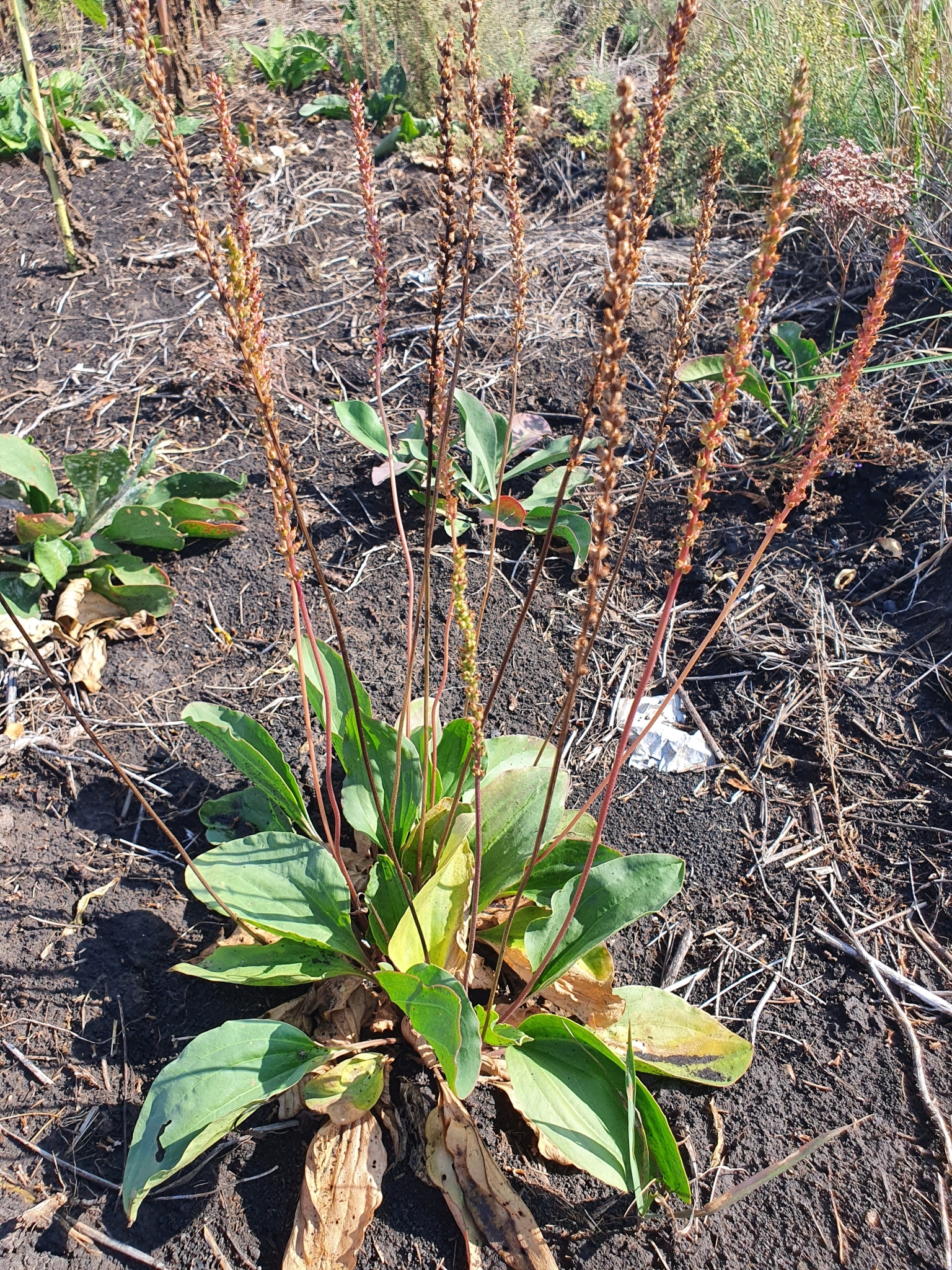

Scientific classification
- Kingdom: Plantae
- Clade: Tracheophytes
- Clade: Angiosperms
- Clade: Eudicots
- Clade: Asterids
- Order: Lamiales
- Family: Plantaginaceae
- Genus: Plantago
- Species: P. cornuti

Binomial name
- Plantago cornuti Gouan

Synonyms
- Plantago major var. cornuti (Gouan) F.M.Bailey; Plantago major subsp. cornuti (Gouan) Malag.

= Plantago cornuti =

Species of flowering plant

Plantago cornuti is a species of flowering plant belonging to the family Plantaginaceae. It is a perennial native to southern Europe, Ukraine and Crimea, southern and eastern European Russia, the Caucasus, Kazakhstan, Siberia, Mongolia, and Inner Mongolia.
