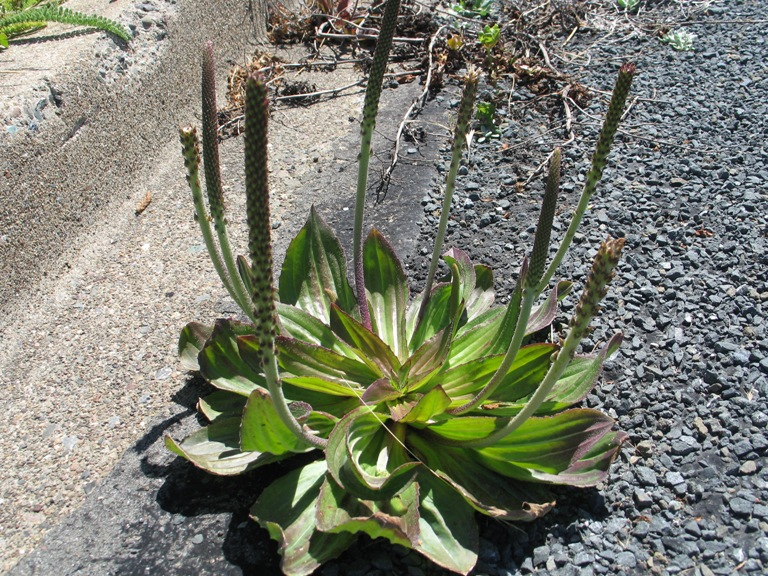

Scientific classification
- Kingdom: Plantae
- Clade: Embryophytes
- Clade: Tracheophytes
- Clade: Angiosperms
- Clade: Eudicots
- Clade: Asterids
- Order: Lamiales
- Family: Plantaginaceae
- Genus: Plantago
- Species: P. subnuda

Binomial name
- Plantago subnuda Pilg.

= Plantago subnuda =

Species of flowering plant in the plantain family

Plantago subnuda is a species of plantain known by the common name tall coastal plantain. It is native to western North America from the west coast of the United States to west-central Mexico, where it grows in wet and moist habitat types, often in coastal areas, such as marshland. It is a perennial herb producing few oval leaves around a thick caudex. The broad smooth-edged or slightly toothed leaves may be up to 40 centimeters (16 in) long. The stemlike inflorescences grow erect to a maximum height near half a meter. Atop the peduncle of the inflorescence is a dense cylindrical spike of many tiny flowers. Each flower has a corolla of ephemeral petals about 3 millimeters long.
