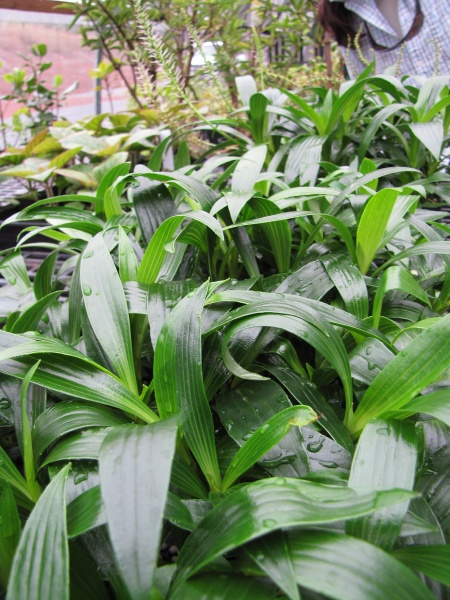
- Plantago princeps var. laxifolia

Conservation status
- Critically Imperiled (NatureServe)

Scientific classification
- Kingdom: Plantae
- Clade: Tracheophytes
- Clade: Angiosperms
- Clade: Eudicots
- Clade: Asterids
- Order: Lamiales
- Family: Plantaginaceae
- Genus: Plantago
- Species: P. princeps

Binomial name
- Plantago princeps Cham. & Schltdl.

= Plantago princeps =

Species of flowering plant in the plantain family

Plantago princeps is a rare species of flowering plant in the plantain family known by the common name ale. It is endemic to Hawaii, where it is known from the islands of Hawaii, Kauai, Oahu, Molokai, and Maui. Like other Hawaiian Plantago, it is known as kuahiwi laukahi, or laukahi kuahiwi. It is a federally listed endangered species of the United States.

This is a large perennial herb or a shrub. The hairy leaves are up to 30 centimeters long by 5 wide and are borne on winged petioles. The inflorescence is a spike of flowers on an erect scape. The tiny flowers are a few millimeters wide. Although the taxonomy is not certain, most authors divide the species into four varieties: var. anomala, var. laxifolia, var. longibracteata, and var. princeps.

This plant grows in moist and wet forested habitat types, sometimes on steep cliffs and near waterfalls. The var. anomala is native to Kauai, where there have been fewer than 100 plants counted. The var. laxifolia is known from Molokai, where its numbers have recently dwindled and none were found in a recent search. This variety is also found on Maui, where there are seven small populations, or perhaps fewer. It once grew on the island of Hawaii, but it has not been noted there in over a century. The var. longibracteata is native to Kauai and there have been several thousand plants counted recently. It once grew on Oahu but it has apparently been extirpated from that island. The var. princeps is native to Oahu where there are fewer than 100 individuals scattered in several different locations.

This plant is threatened by feral ungulates such as pigs and goats, introduced species of plants invading its habitat, and downy mildew disease caused by Peronospora kuewa.
