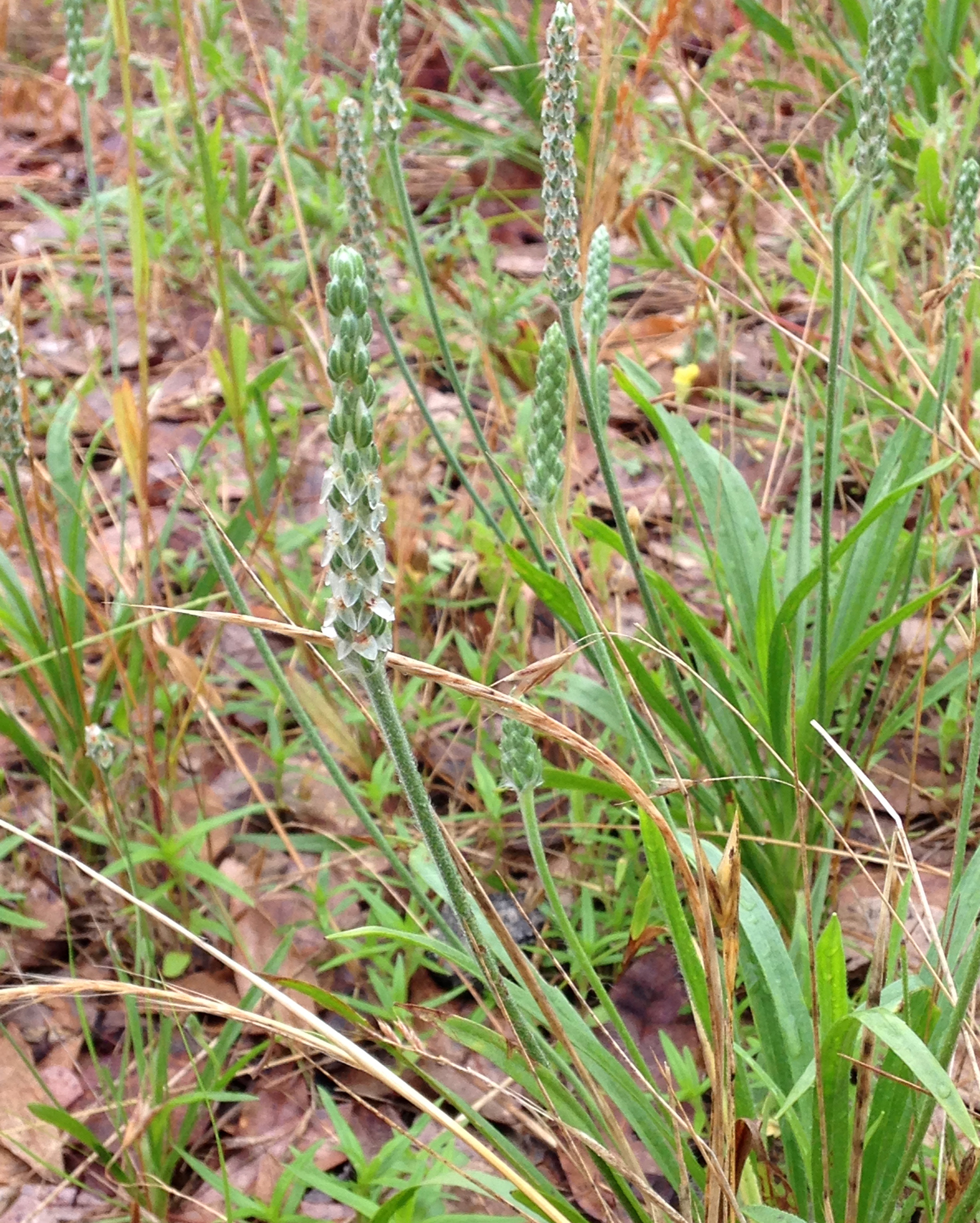

Conservation status
- Secure (NatureServe)

Scientific classification
- Kingdom: Plantae
- Clade: Tracheophytes
- Clade: Angiosperms
- Clade: Eudicots
- Clade: Asterids
- Order: Lamiales
- Family: Plantaginaceae
- Genus: Plantago
- Species: P. hookeriana

Binomial name
- Plantago hookeriana Fisch. & C.A.Mey.

= Plantago hookeriana =

Species of flowering plant in the plantain family

Plantago hookeriana, commonly called Hookers plantain, is a species of flowering plant in the plantain family (Plantaginaceae). It is native to Texas and Louisiana in the United States. It is typically found in disturbed sandy areas.

This species is an annual herb growing from a taproot. The leaves are linear or lance-shaped and may reach 30 centimeters (12 in) long, but are usually smaller. The inflorescence is a narrow spike up to 12 centimeters (4.7 in) long. Each small flower has whitish corolla lobes with brown spots or stripes. It flowers in the spring.

This species is planted to provide a forage and to revegetate wildlife habitat and rangeland. The seed provides food for many types of game birds and the foliage is consumed by several types of animals, such as deer.

The Latin specific epithet hookeriana refers to William Jackson Hooker.
