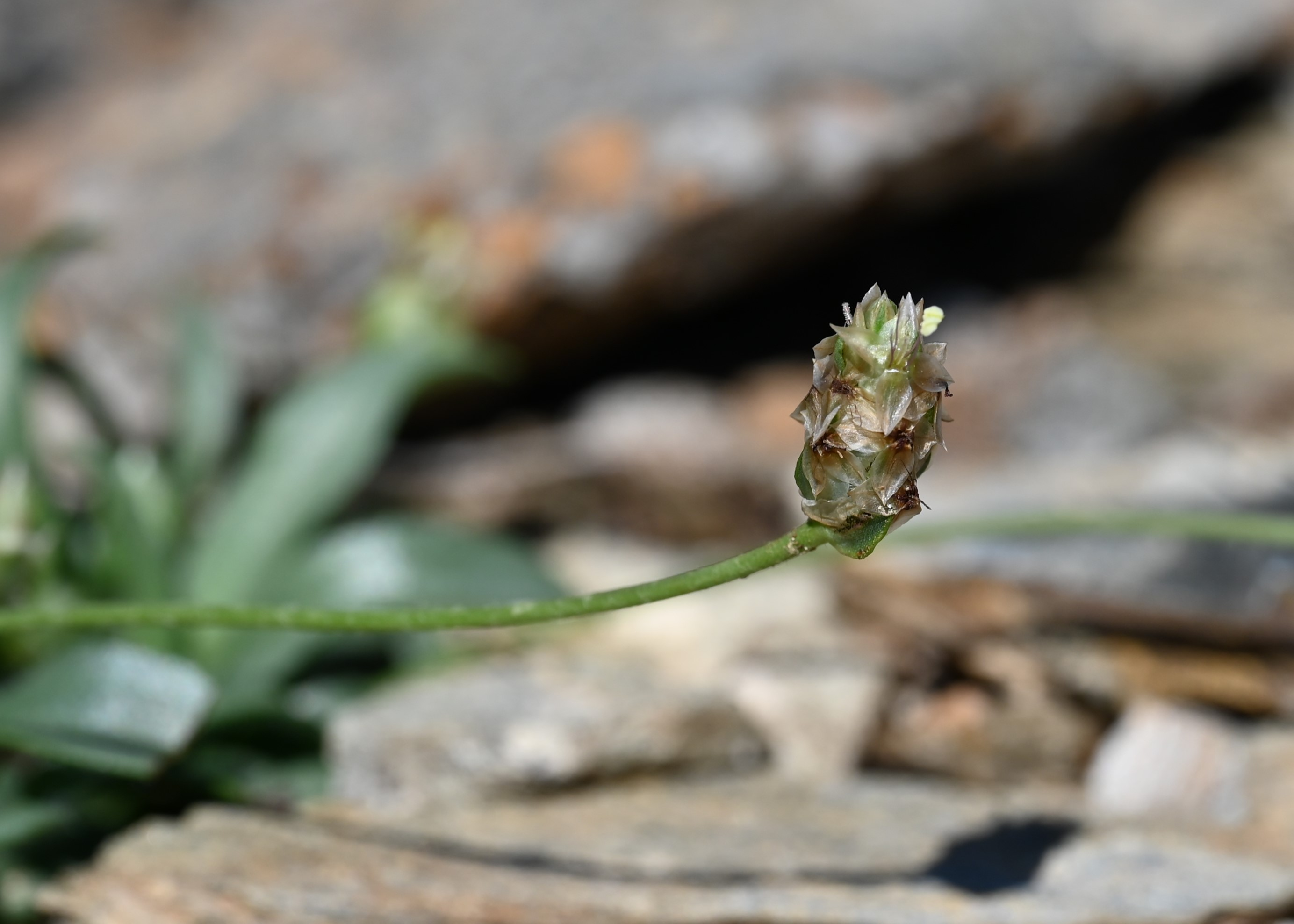

Scientific classification
- Kingdom: Plantae
- Clade: Tracheophytes
- Clade: Angiosperms
- Clade: Eudicots
- Clade: Asterids
- Order: Lamiales
- Family: Plantaginaceae
- Genus: Plantago
- Species: P. amplexicaulis

Binomial name
- Plantago amplexicaulis Cav.

Synonyms
- Plantago lagopoides Desf.

= Plantago amplexicaulis =

Species of flowering plant in the plantain family

Plantago amplexicaulis is an annual plant of the family Plantaginaceae and the genus Plantago that grows in dry sand and deserts.

Plantago amplexicaulis is a therophyte, a type of plant that survives as seed during unfavourable conditions. In the deserts where P. amplexicaulis lives, this results in the desert suddenly bursting into bloom after a rainstorm.
