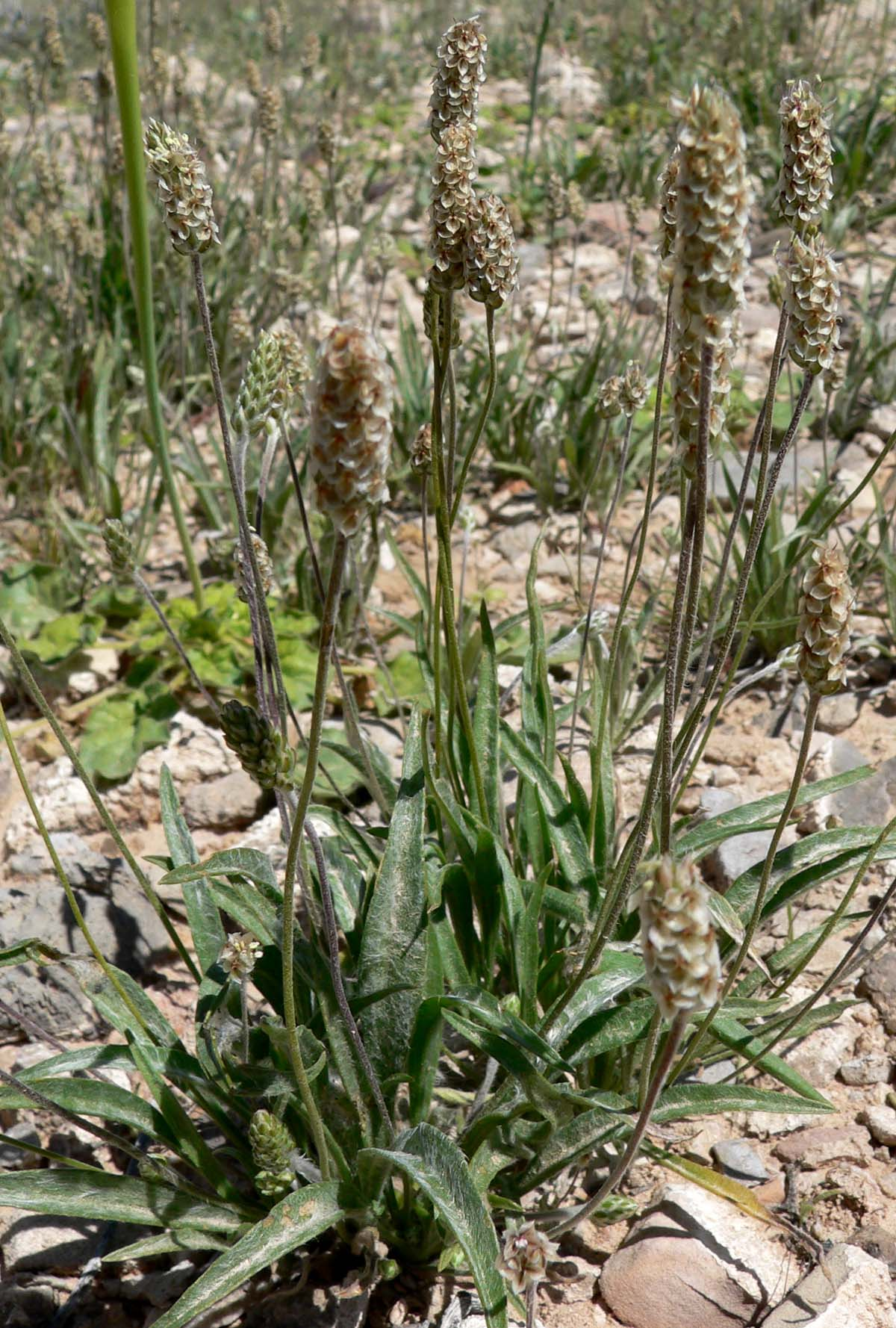

Scientific classification
- Kingdom: Plantae
- Clade: Embryophytes
- Clade: Tracheophytes
- Clade: Spermatophytes
- Clade: Angiosperms
- Clade: Eudicots
- Clade: Asterids
- Order: Lamiales
- Family: Plantaginaceae
- Genus: Plantago
- Species: P. ovata

Binomial name
- Plantago ovata Forssk.

Synonyms
- Plantago brunnea Morris; Plantago fastigiata Morris; Plantago gooddingii A.Nels. & Kennedy; Plantago insularis Eastw.; Plantago minima A.Cunningham

= Plantago ovata =

Species of flowering plant in the plantain family

Plantago ovata, known by many common names including blond plantain, desert Indianwheat, blond psyllium, and isabghol, is native to the Mediterranean region and naturalized in central, eastern, and south Asia and North America.

A common source of psyllium, ground psyllium seed husks are indigestible, providing a source of soluble dietary fiber which may be fermented into butyric acid – a short-chain fatty acid – by butyrate-producing bacteria. Plantago ovata is commonly used for commercial products containing psyllium.
