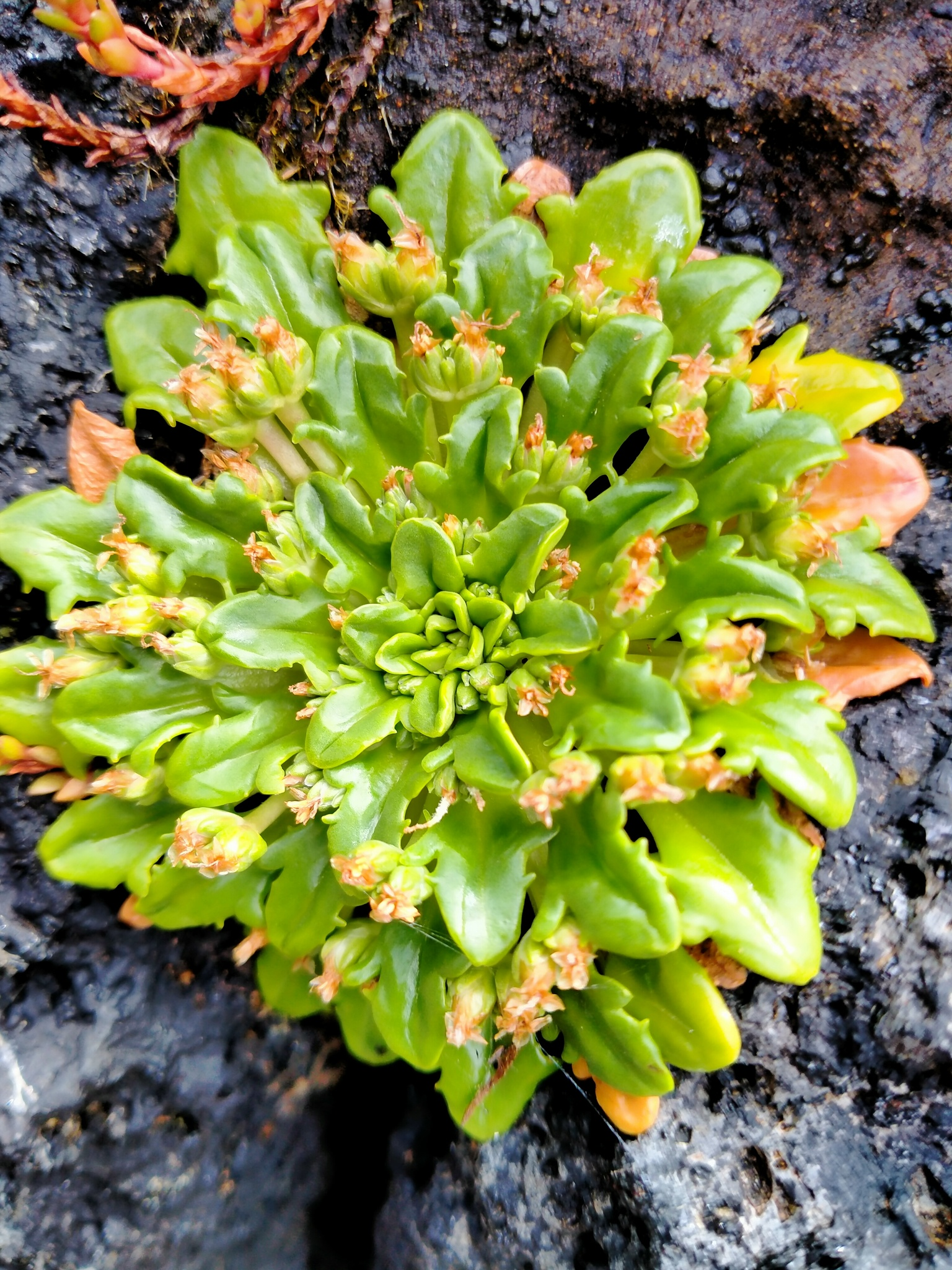
- Rosette of Plantago brownii, photographed on Auckland Island

Conservation status
- Naturally Uncommon (NZ TCS)

Scientific classification
- Kingdom: Plantae
- Clade: Embryophytes
- Clade: Tracheophytes
- Clade: Angiosperms
- Clade: Eudicots
- Clade: Asterids
- Order: Lamiales
- Family: Plantaginaceae
- Genus: Plantago
- Species: P. brownii

Binomial name
- Plantago brownii F.Dietr.

Synonyms
- Plantago carnosa R.Br (1810) non Lam. (1791); Plantago brownii Rapin (1827); Plantago browniana Schultes & Schultes (1827); Plantago subantarctica Cockayne (1928) Plantago triantha Spreng. (1824)

= Plantago brownii =

Species of flowering plant in the plantain family

Plantago brownii is a species of flowering plant in the family Plantaginaceae that is native to Tasmania, Australia and the subantarctic Auckland Islands of New Zealand. Robert Brown described the species in 1810, as P. carnosa R.Br. Plants of this species of plantain are annual or perennial with a rosette habit, fleshy toothed leaves, and short inflorescences.

== Taxonomy and etymology ==
Plantago brownii F.Dietr. is in the plant family Plantaginaceae. It was first described by Scottish botanist Robert Brown in his 1810 Prodromus florae Novae Hollandiae as Plantago carnosa R.Br. based on a specimen collected by Brown in 1804 in Port Esperance in the D'Entrecasteaux Channel near Dover, Tasmania.

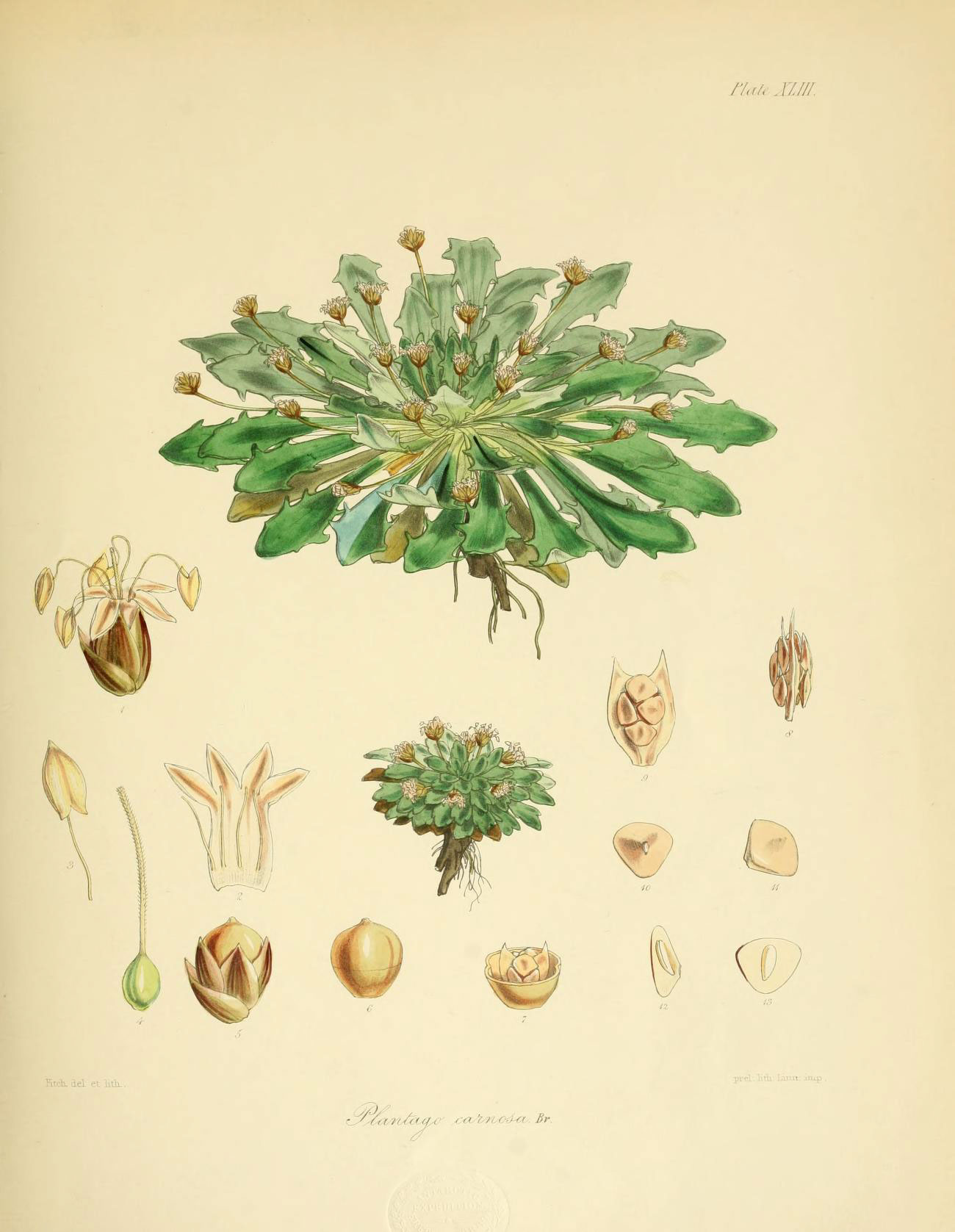
Illustration of Plantago triantha

The holotype specimen is at the Natural History Museum, London (R. Brown 298; BM000898120).

The name P. carnosa R.Br. is illegitimate, since Plantago carnosa Lam. had already been described for a different, South African plant by French botanist Jean-Baptiste Lamark in 1792.

In the 1800s, several botanists suggested new names for this species, including German botanist Kurt Polycarp Joachim Sprengel whose name Plantago triantha Spreng. has been used for this species since its publication in late 1824. However, David Mabberley and colleagues published evidence an article in 2020 and in a book in 2022 showing that Plantago brownii F.Dietr. is an earlier replacement name that was published in 1820 by Friedrich Dietrich. Therefore, P. brownii F.Dietr. is the correct name as it has priority over P. triantha Spreng.

The specific epithet triantha means 'three-flowered', whereas the epithet brownii honours Robert Brown, who published the original description of this species.

== Description ==
Plantago brownii plants are rosettes with a primary root up to 1 cm thick, with up to 65 angular-obovate leaves, and with short (<3 mm long), concealed leaf axillary hairs in the basal rosette. The leaves are 1–3 veined, 0.5-9 cm long (including petiole) and up to 1.7 cm wide, not punctate, usually glabrous on both surfaces, and sometimes with isolated hairs. The leaf has an acute apex, and its edges are smooth or with 2–6 small teeth. The petiole is usually distinguishable from the leaf lamina, and up to 7 cm long. Each rosette plant has 4–42 erect inflorescences which can be up to 12 cm long. The scapes are ribbed and hairy with patent hairs. The spikes are globose with 1–8 densely crowded flowers. Each flower has a bract that is ovate to very broadly ovate and glabrous (or sometimes with a few hairs at the apex). The calyx is 2.6–3.9 mm long, 1.4–3.5 mm wide, mostly glabrous but sometimes with a few hairs on the margins or midrib. The corolla tube is 1.9–3.3 mm long, corolla lobes 1.0–1.8 mm long, stamen filaments 2.1–4.7 mm long, anthers 1.0–1.7 mm long, and style 2.3–5.4 mm long and densely hairy. The ovary is 0.9–1.8 mm long, with 7–10 ovules. The fruit is a dry, dehiscent capsule with circumsessile dehiscence, usually ellipsoid to globose, widest at or above middle, 2.1–4.0 mm long and 0.9–3.2 mm wide. Each capsule has 3–10 uniform brown seeds 0.9–1.8 mm long of various shapes.

Plantago brownii has flowers and fruits from November to February.

The chromosome number of Plantago brownii is n=12.

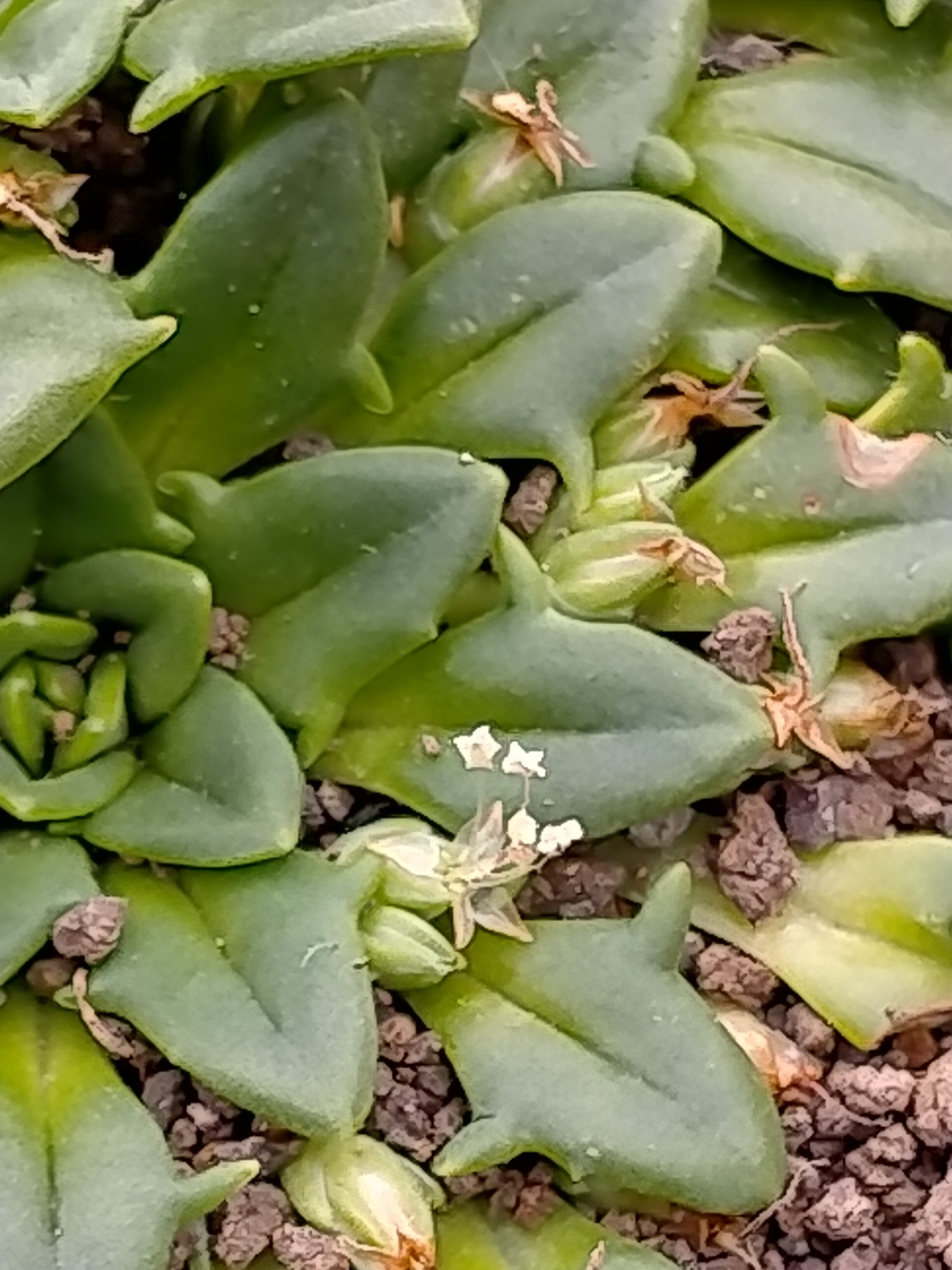
Close up of leaves and flower, Auckland Island

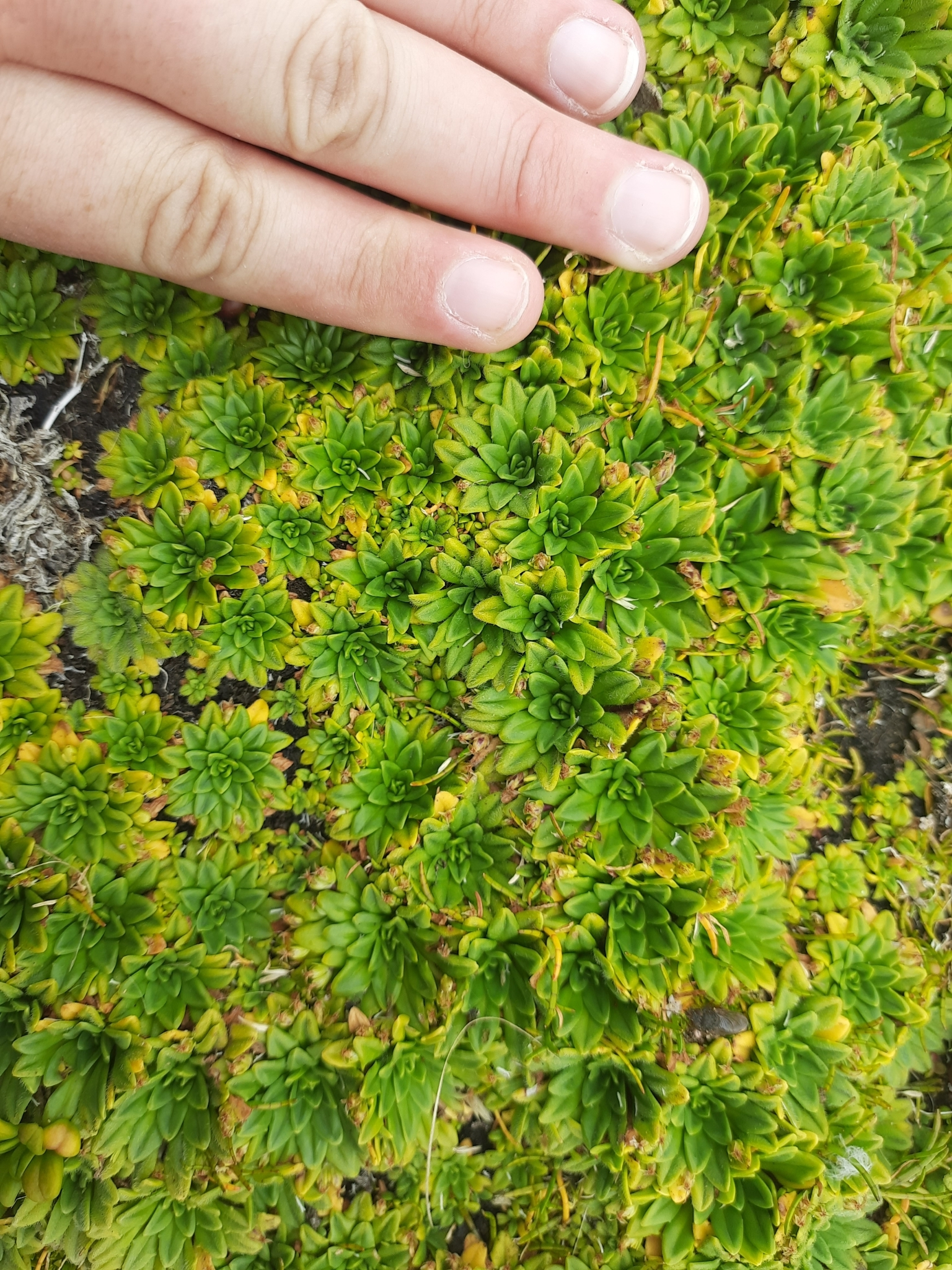
Rosettes forming a compact matt

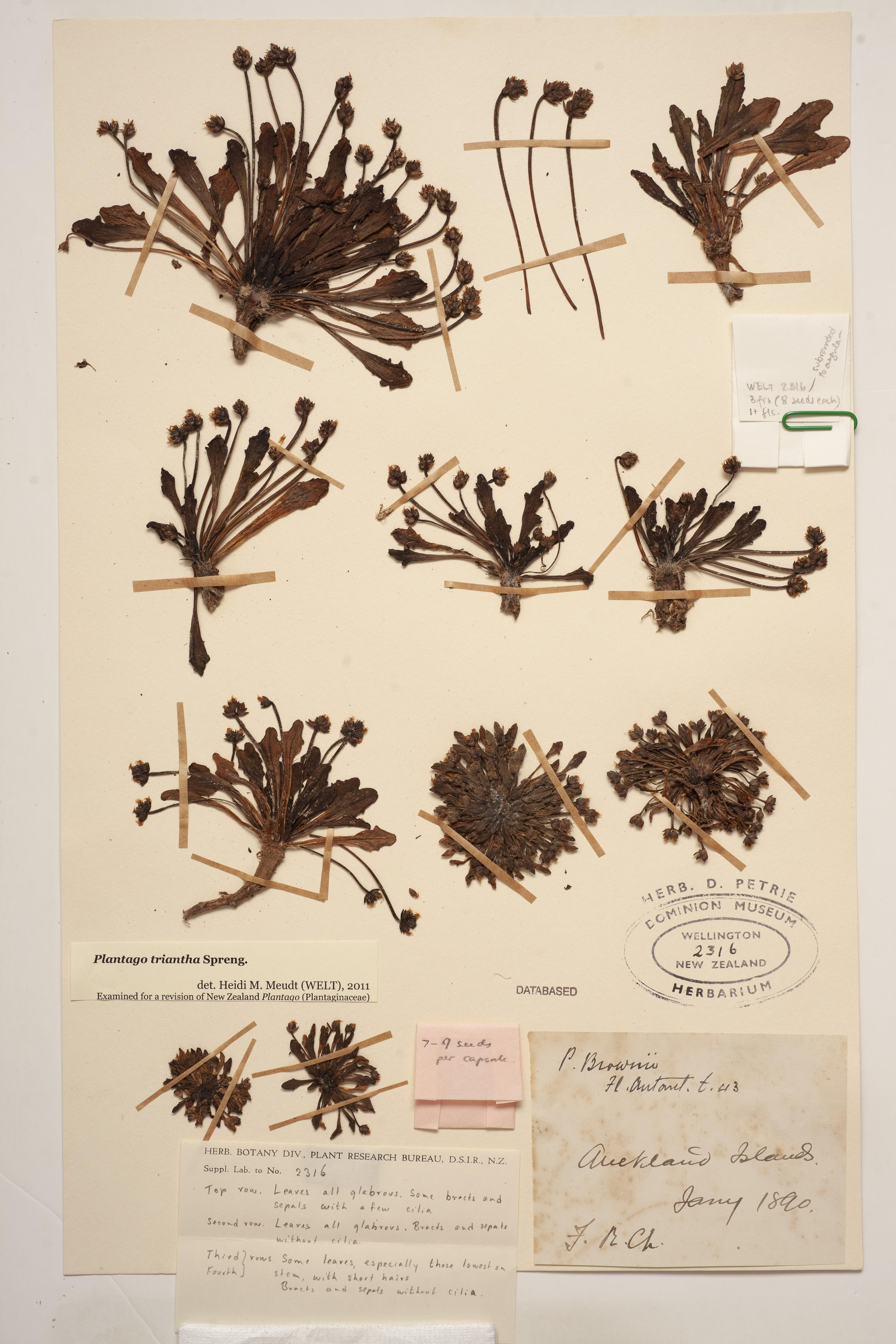
Te Papa herbarium specimen collected by Frederick Chapman in the Auckland Islands in 1890

== Distribution and habitat ==
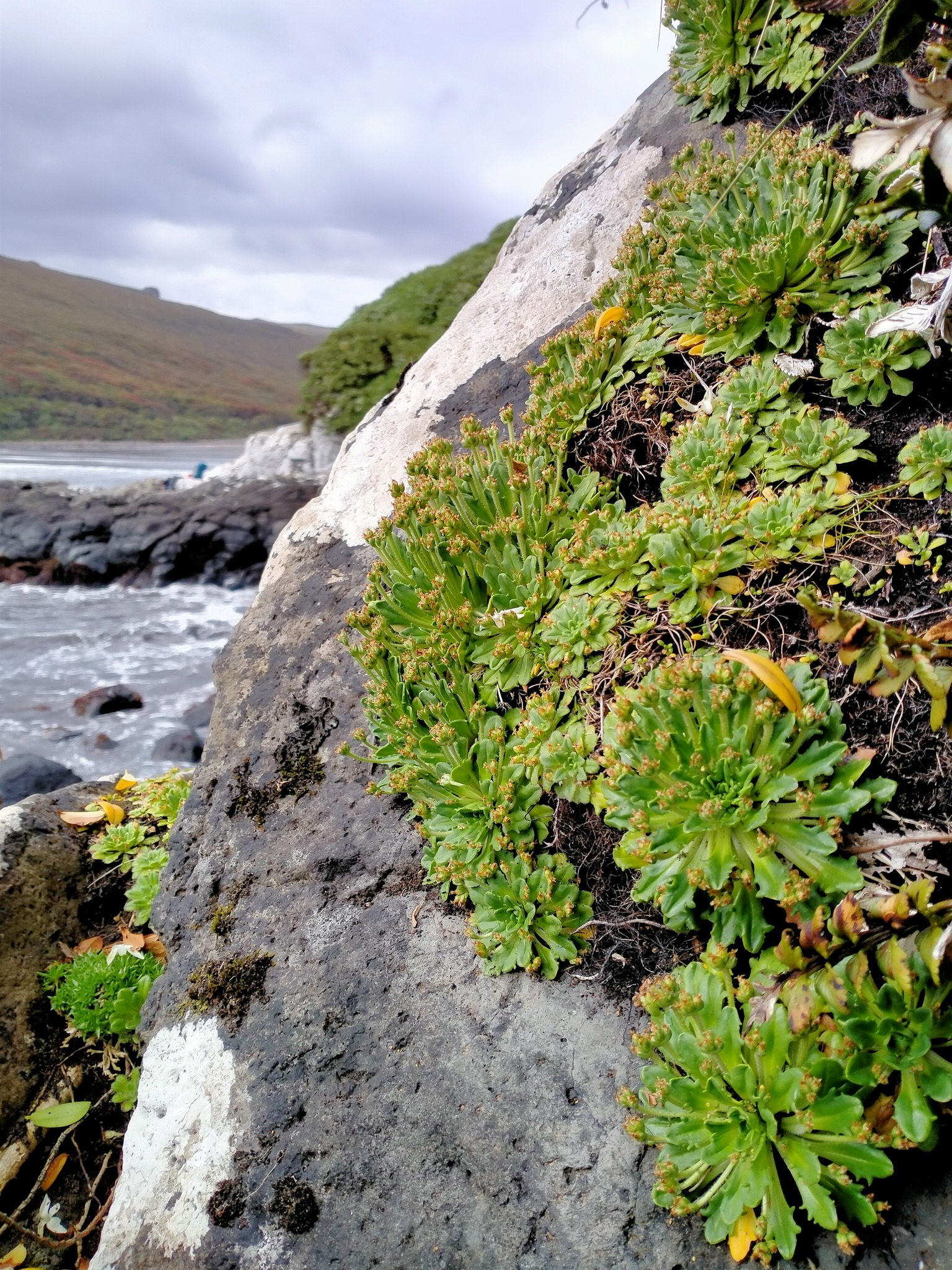
Plantago brownii plants in coastal, rocky salt spray habitat on Auckland Island

Plantago brownii is a plantain that is native to Tasmania, Australia and the subantarctic Auckland Islands of New Zealand.

In the Auckland Islands, it is found on the main Auckland Island, Enderby Island and Ocean Island, and has also been reported on Rose Island. Enderby Island, P. triantha can form large, dense "lawns" near the coast.

In Tasmania, it is found throughout the main island, especially the northwest, west and southeast coasts, plus Flinders Island, Cape Barren Island, Flat Witch Island, Sarah Island and Tasman Island.

Plantago brownii is a halophyte that can form patches or dense turf on coastal rocks and soil in the salt spray zone near the high tide mark, from 0-20 m above sea level (rarely up to 200m elevation). It can be a dominant plant in the herbfields of such habitats in Tasmania.

== Phylogeny ==
Plantago brownii was included in phylogenetic analyses of Australasian species of Plantago using standard DNA sequencing markers (nuclear ribosomal DNA, chloroplast DNA, and mitochondrial DNA regions). In that study, Plantago brownii was moderately to strongly supported as being closely related to the Australian species Plantago varia and Plantago debilis. These three species are in a clade that comprises other native Australian species plus the New Zealand species Plantago spathulata and Plantago raoulii.

Plantago brownii was not included in other phylogenetic studies of the New Zealand species using amplified fragment length polymorphisms (AFLPs) nor those focusing on Plantago species throughout the world using whole chloroplast genomes or standard DNA sequencing markers.

== Seed composition ==
The seeds of Plantago brownii have low levels of mucilage and very low water absorption capacity, but very high in protein content, over 30% (w/w).

== Conservation status ==
The species is listed as At Risk - Naturally Uncommon in the most recent assessment (2017–2018) of the New Zealand Threatened Classification for plants, as it was in 2009 and 2012. It also has the qualifiers "RR" (Range Restricted) and "SO" (Secure Overseas).

Prior to the eradication of feral goats on the Auckland Islands, Plantago brownii was one of about 50 native plants that were found in the rumens of feral goats. Remains of P. brownii were not found in the stomachs of feral pigs, which are still present on Auckland Island.
