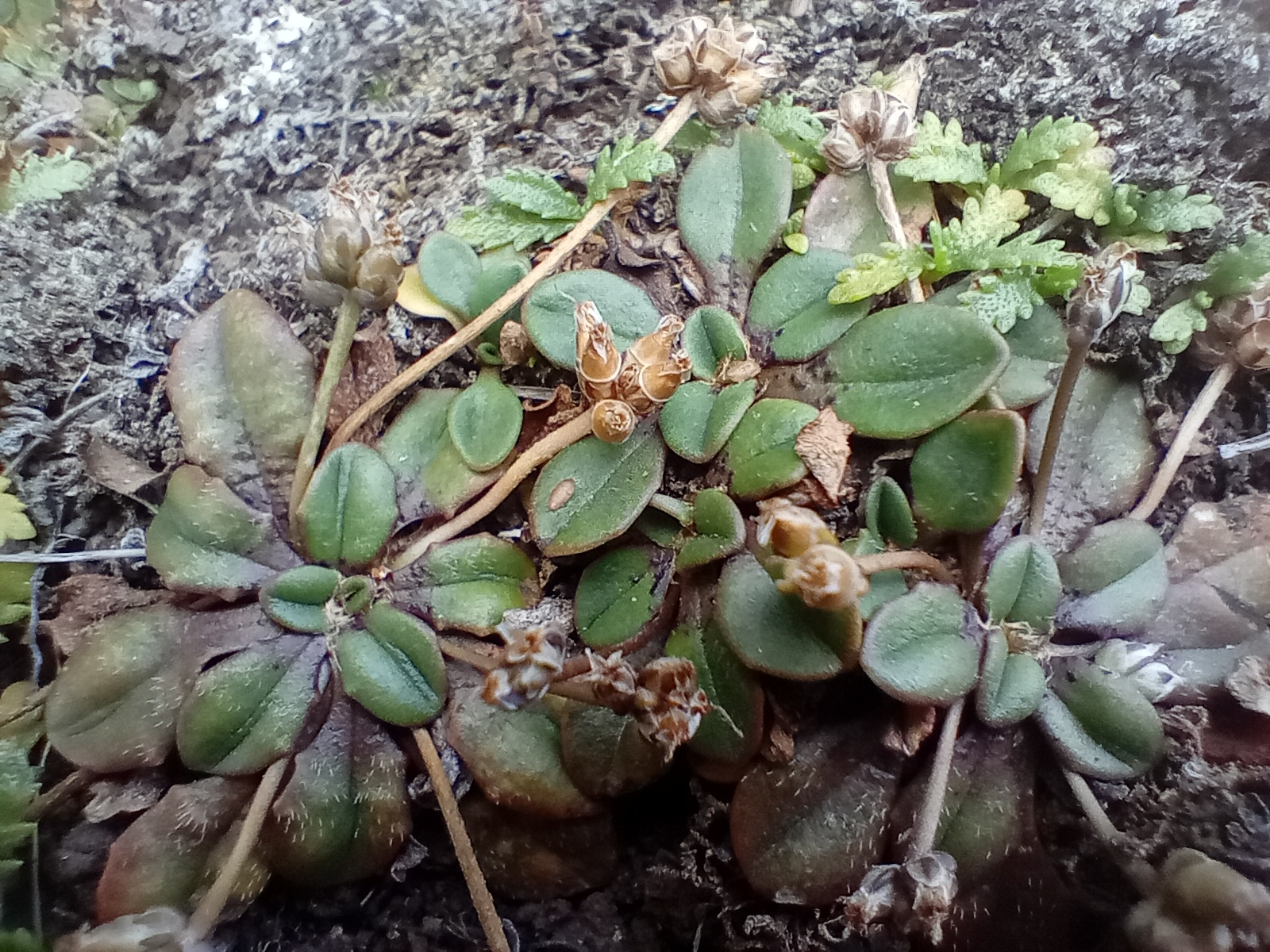
- Plantago raoulii with fruiting capsules observed on the Otago Peninsula, South Island New Zealand

Conservation status
- Not Threatened (NZ TCS)

Scientific classification
- Kingdom: Plantae
- Clade: Tracheophytes
- Clade: Angiosperms
- Clade: Eudicots
- Clade: Asterids
- Order: Lamiales
- Family: Plantaginaceae
- Genus: Plantago
- Species: P. raoulii

Binomial name
- Plantago raoulii Decne.

Synonyms
- Plantago dasyphylla Colenso

= Plantago raoulii =

Species of flowering plant in the plantain family

Plantago raoulii (also known as kopakopa or tūkōrehu in te reo Māori) is a species of flowering plant in the family Plantaginaceae that is endemic to New Zealand. Joseph Decaisne described P. raoulii in 1852. Plants of this species of plantain are perennial with a rosette habit, leaves widest above the middle, usually 5 seeds in a specific arrangement in each capsule, and bracts with mostly glabrous edges. It is listed as Not Threatened.

== Taxonomy ==
Plantago raoulii Decne. is in the plant family Plantaginaceae. French botanist Joseph Decaisne described P. raoulii in 1852. It is known in te reo Māori as kopakopa or tūkōrehu.

The type material was collected by Édouard Fiacre Louison Raoul on Banks Peninsula, South Island, New Zealand in 1843. The holotype and an isotype are housed at the Paris Herbarium.

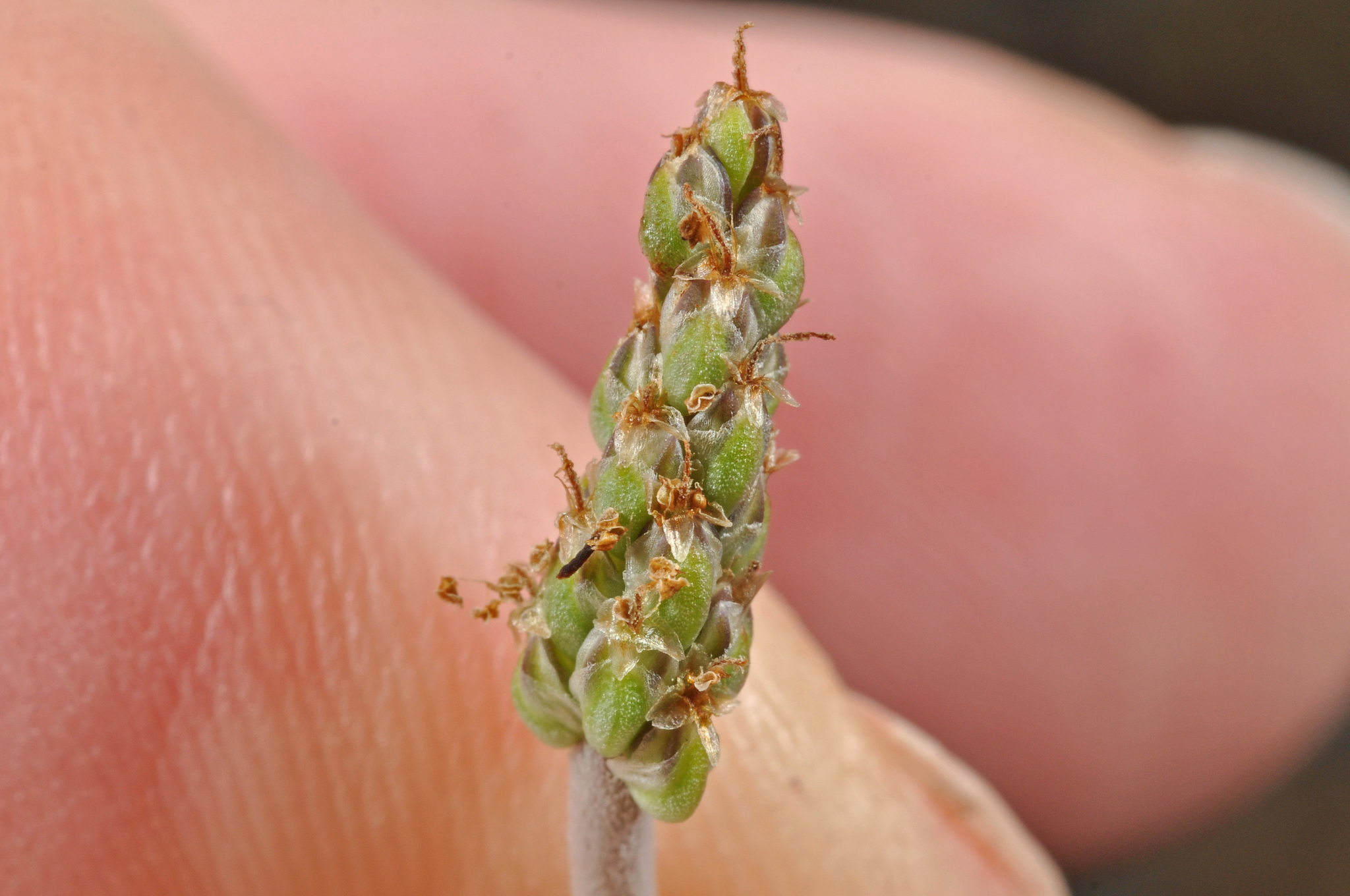
Close-up of spike with flowers of Plantago raoulii

Plantago raoulii is morphologically most similar to P. spathulata, P. picta and P. udicola.

P. raoulii can be distinguished from these and other New Zealand Plantago species by having usually 5 seeds in a certain arrangement inside the capsule. Four of the seeds are vertically oriented, and of these, one pair is short and the other pair is long. The fifth seed is horizontally oriented and in a special compartment above the two shorter seeds.

P. raoulii can be further distinguished from P. udicola by the bract hairs (glabrous or few hairs hairs on apex only vs. sparsely ciliate), shorter calyx (1.6–2.4 mm vs 2.3–3.5 mm) and smaller corolla lobes (0.6–1.2 mm long by 0.3–0.7 mm wide vs.1.2–2.9 mm long by 0.6–1.3 mm wide).

It can be distinguished from P. spathulata and P. picta by sepal margins (glabrous or with a few hairs at apex only vs. sparsely ciliate), bract apex (obtuse or acute vs. acute) and scape hair type.

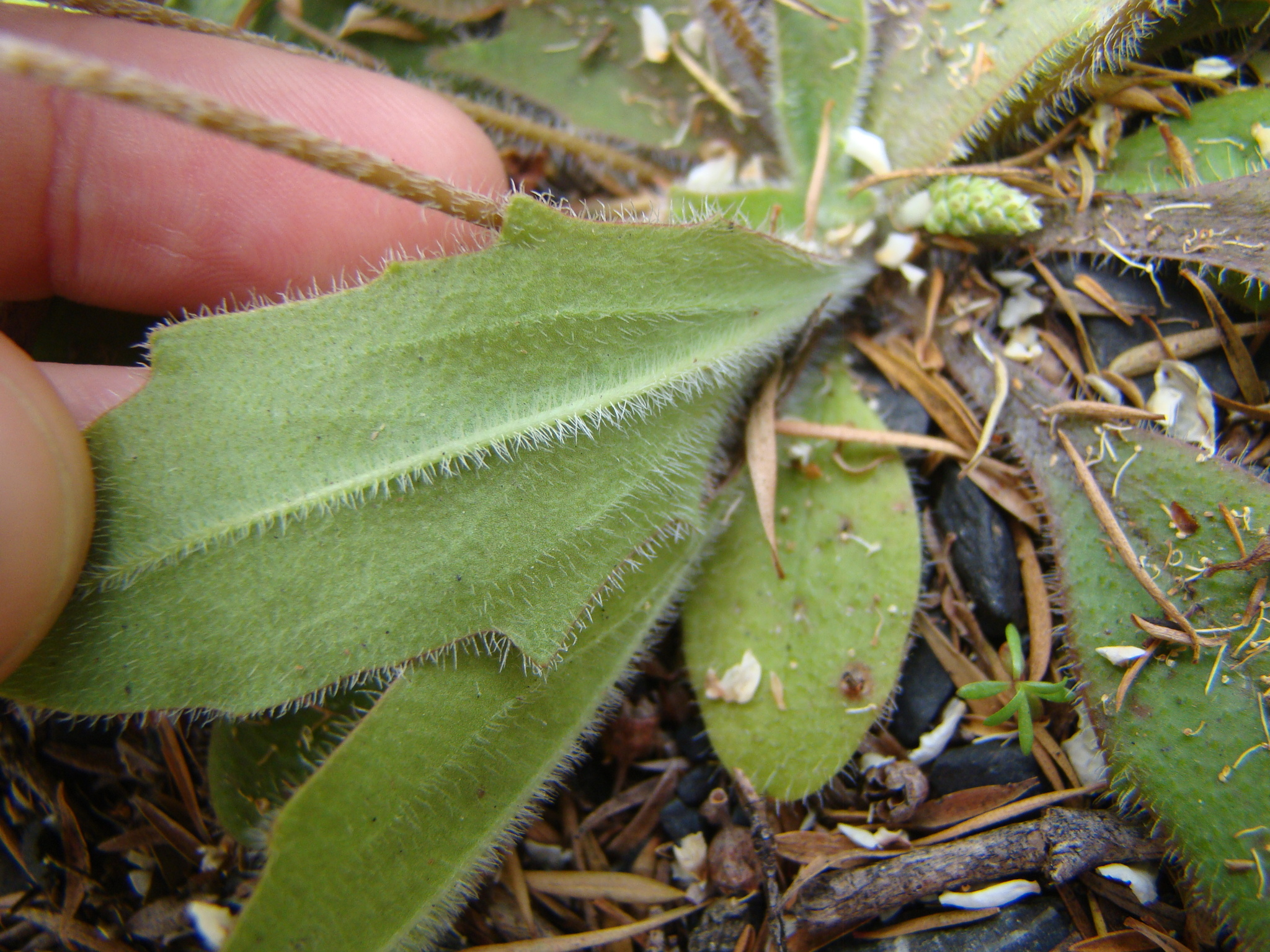
The densely hairy underside of a rosette leaf of Plantago raoulii

== Description ==
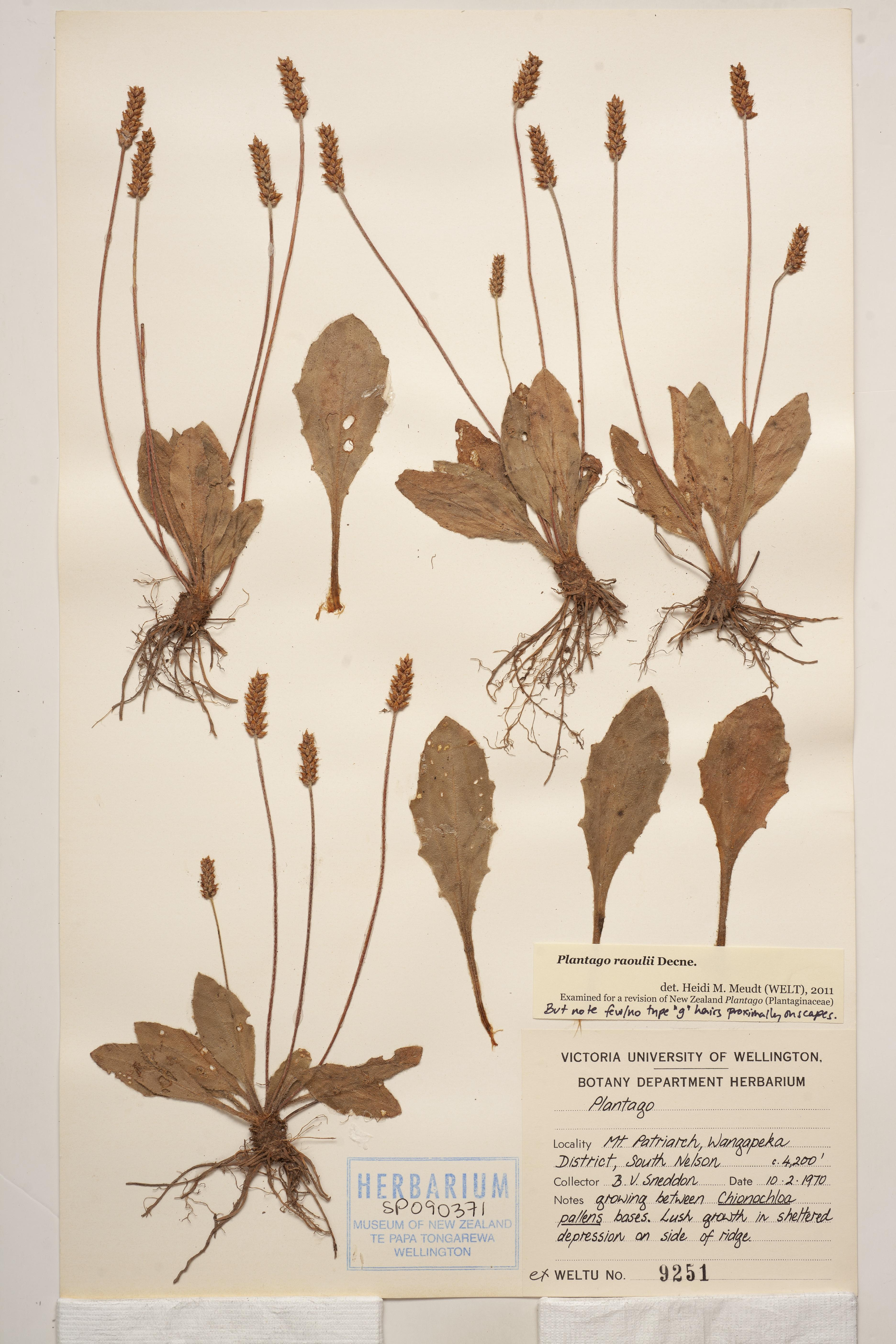
Te Papa herbarium specimen of P. raoulii collected on the South Island, New Zealand, by Barry Sneddon in 1970

Plantago raoulii plants are small rosettes with a primary root up to 17 mm thick, with up to 21 usually narrowly angular-obovate, angular-obovate, linear or narrowly rhombic leaves, and with visible, short (<11 mm long), rust-coloured leaf axillary hairs in the basal rosette. The leaves have 1–3 (or sometimes 5) veins, are 21–270 mm long (including petiole) and up to 27 mm wide, not punctate, usually sparsely hairy on the upper surface, and usually sparely or densely hairy on the lower surface. The leaf usually has an acute apex, and its edges are smooth or wavy or with up to 14 minute to medium-sized teeth, and usually sparsely hairy near the teeth. The petiole is usually distinguishable from the leaf lamina, and up to 167 mm long. Each rosette plant has up to 20 erect inflorescences which can be up to 386 mm long. The scapes are smooth and sparsely to densely hairy. The spikes are usually linear-ovoid with 5–32 densely crowded flowers. Each flower has 1 small bract that is ovate, broadly ovate or very broadly ovate and glabrous except for isolated hairs near the apex and sometimes on the midrib. The calyx is 1.5–2.4 mm long, 1.1–2.7 mm wide, with isolated hairs at the apex, otherwise glabrous. The corolla tube is 1.3–2.2 mm long, corolla lobes 0.6–1.2 mm long, stamen filaments 0.7–2.5 mm long, anthers 0.5–1.0 mm long, and style 1.1–3.6 mm long and densely hairy. The ovary is 0.8–2.0 mm long, with 4–6 ovules. The fruit is a dry, dehiscent capsule with circumsessile dehiscence, ellipsoid, broadly ellipsoid, rhomboid, broadly rhomboid, ovoid or angular-ovoid, widest at or below middle, 1.8–4.3 mm long and 1.1–2.7 mm wide. Each capsule has 4–6 rust, brown or dark brown seeds 0.6–2.2 mm long and 0.4–1.0 mm wide, of two or three size classes, ellipsoid or broadly ellipsoid and rounded(2–4 seeds) or rhomboid, angular-ovoid or broadly angular-ovoid and angular (top seed and sometimes 2 others).

Plantago raoulii flowers from November to March and fruits from about September to May.

The chromosome number of Plantago raoulii is 2n=48.

== Distribution and habitat ==
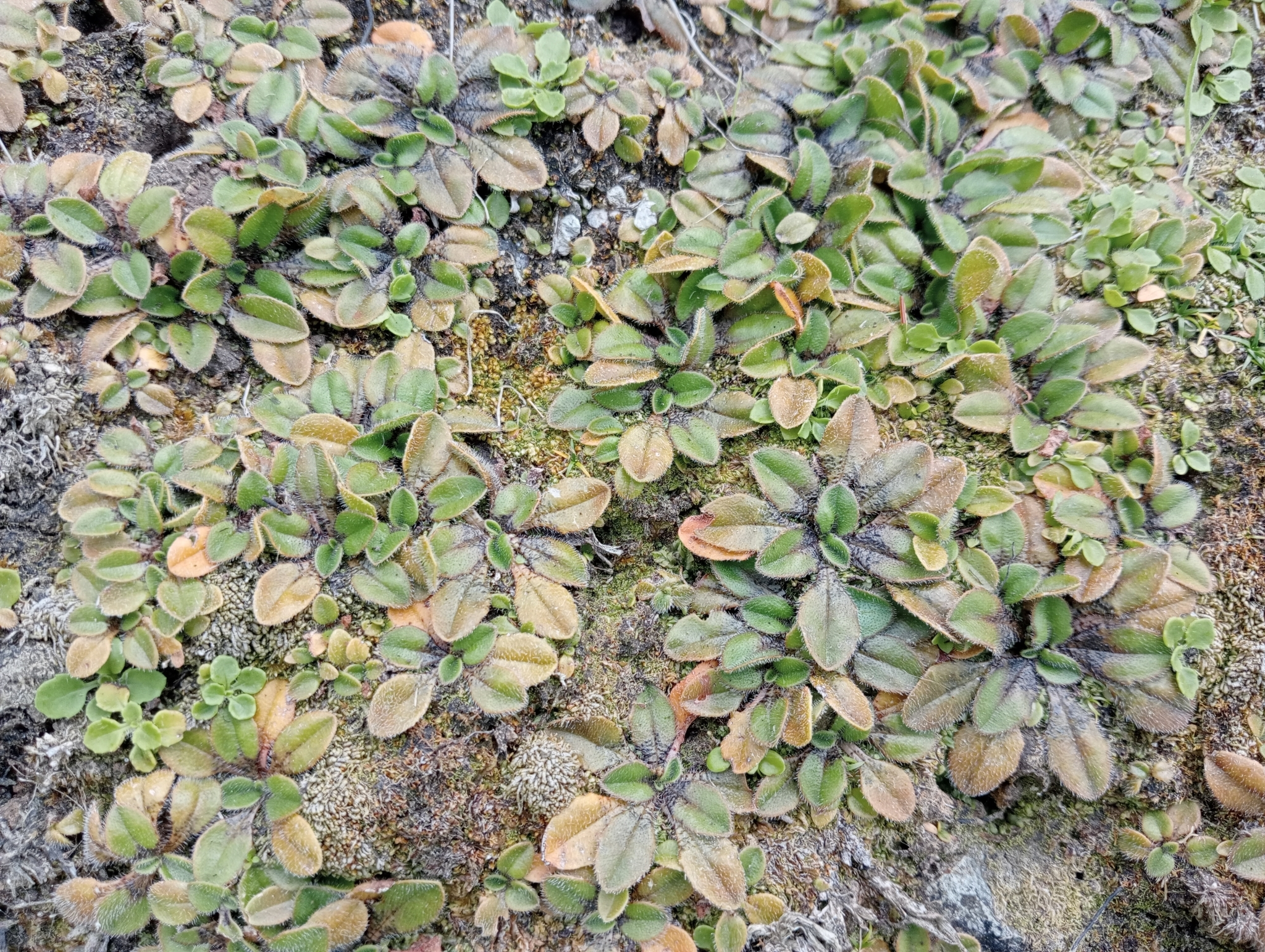
Multiple rosettes of Plantago raoulii

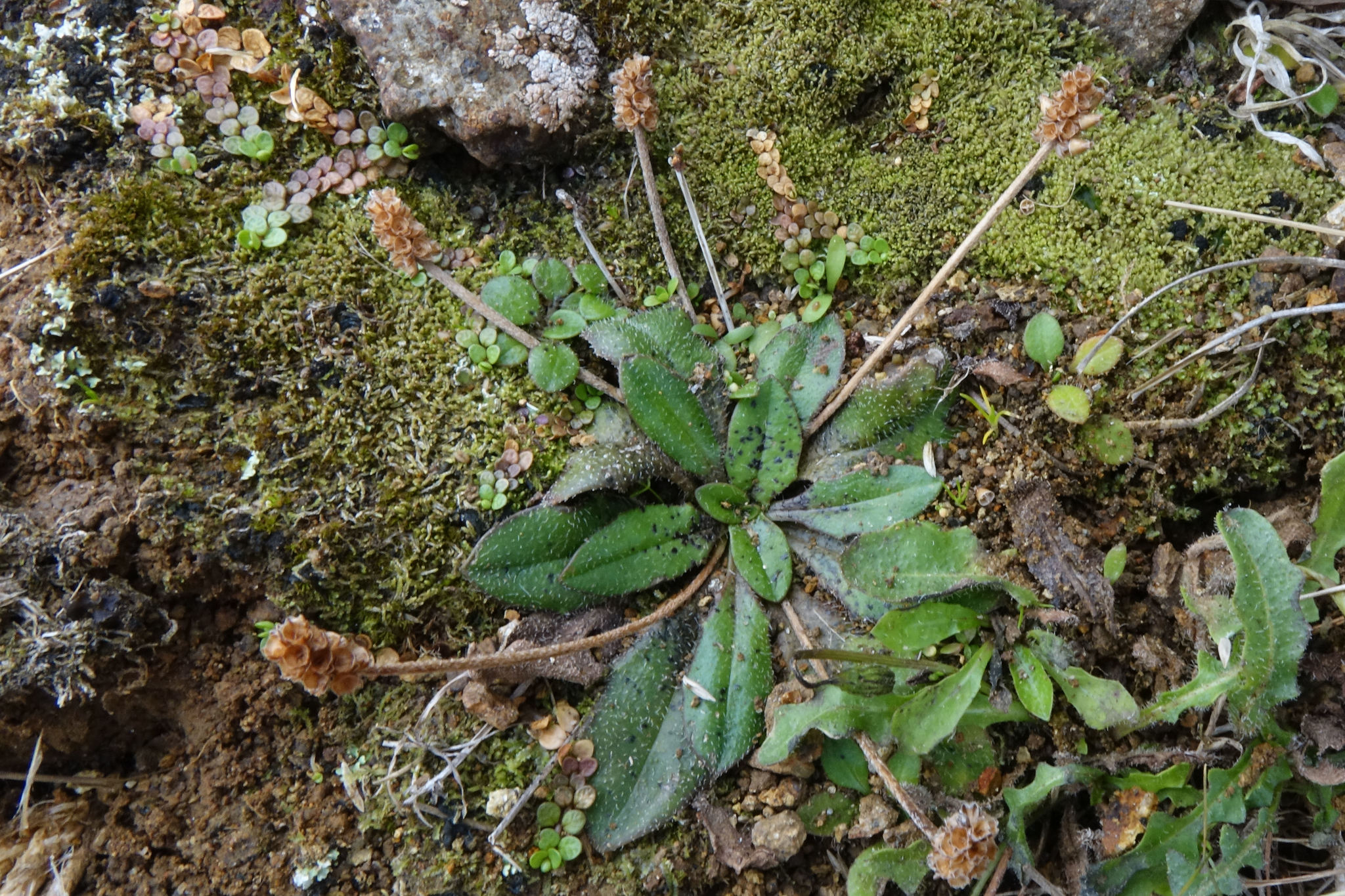
Plantago raoulii rosette with spikes of fruiting capsules

Plantago raoulii is a plantain that is endemic to the North and South Islands of New Zealand. It is widespread throughout New Zealand and can be locally common.

In the North Island P. raoulii is found in the Northland, Auckland (including Inner and Outer Gulf Islands), Volcanic Plateau, Gisborne, Taranaki and Southern North Island regions. In the South Island it is found in the Western Nelson, Sounds Nelson, Marlborough, Westland, Canterbury, Fiordland, Otago, Southland and Fiordland regions.

It is also found on several other islands of the New Zealand archipelago including Manawatāwhi Three Kings Islands, Rakiura Stewart Island and Rēkohu Chatham Islands (including Rēkohu Chatham Island, Rangiaotea Pitt Island and Hokorereoro South East Island).

P. raoulii grows in herbfields, turf, grasslands and forest on rocky, coastal, dry or wet areas, on multiple substrates such as limestone, mudstone, clay, sand, gravel or silt, at 0–1,280 m (0–4,199 ft) above sea level.

== Phylogeny ==
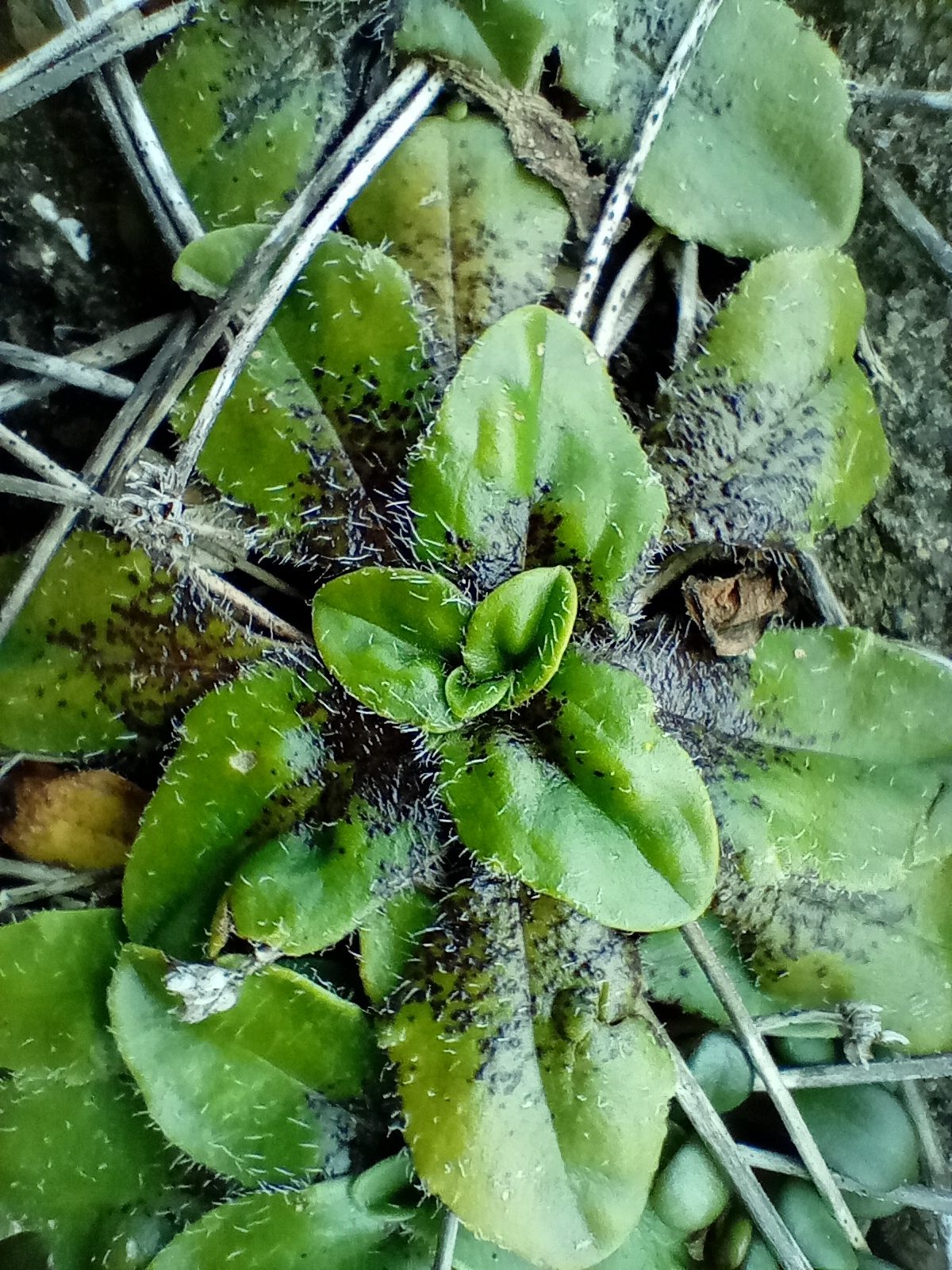
Close-up of the rosette leaves of Plantago raoulii

In phylogenetic analyses of Australasian species of Plantago using standard DNA sequencing markers (nuclear ribosomal DNA, chloroplast DNA, and mitochondrial DNA regions) and amplified fragment length polymorphisms (AFLPs), Plantago raoulii was moderately to strongly supported as being closely related to the mainland New Zealand species P. spathulata, P. picta and P. udicola.

Similarly, the sole individual of P. raoulii was closely related to individuals of P. udicola, P. spathulata and P. picta in another phylogenetic study focusing on Plantago species throughout the world using whole chloroplast genomes. Finally, the species was not included in another phylogenetic studies focusing on oceanic island Plantago species using standard DNA sequencing markers.

== Conservation status ==
Plantago raoulii is listed as Not Threatened in the most recent assessment (2017–2018) of the New Zealand Threatened Classification for plants.
