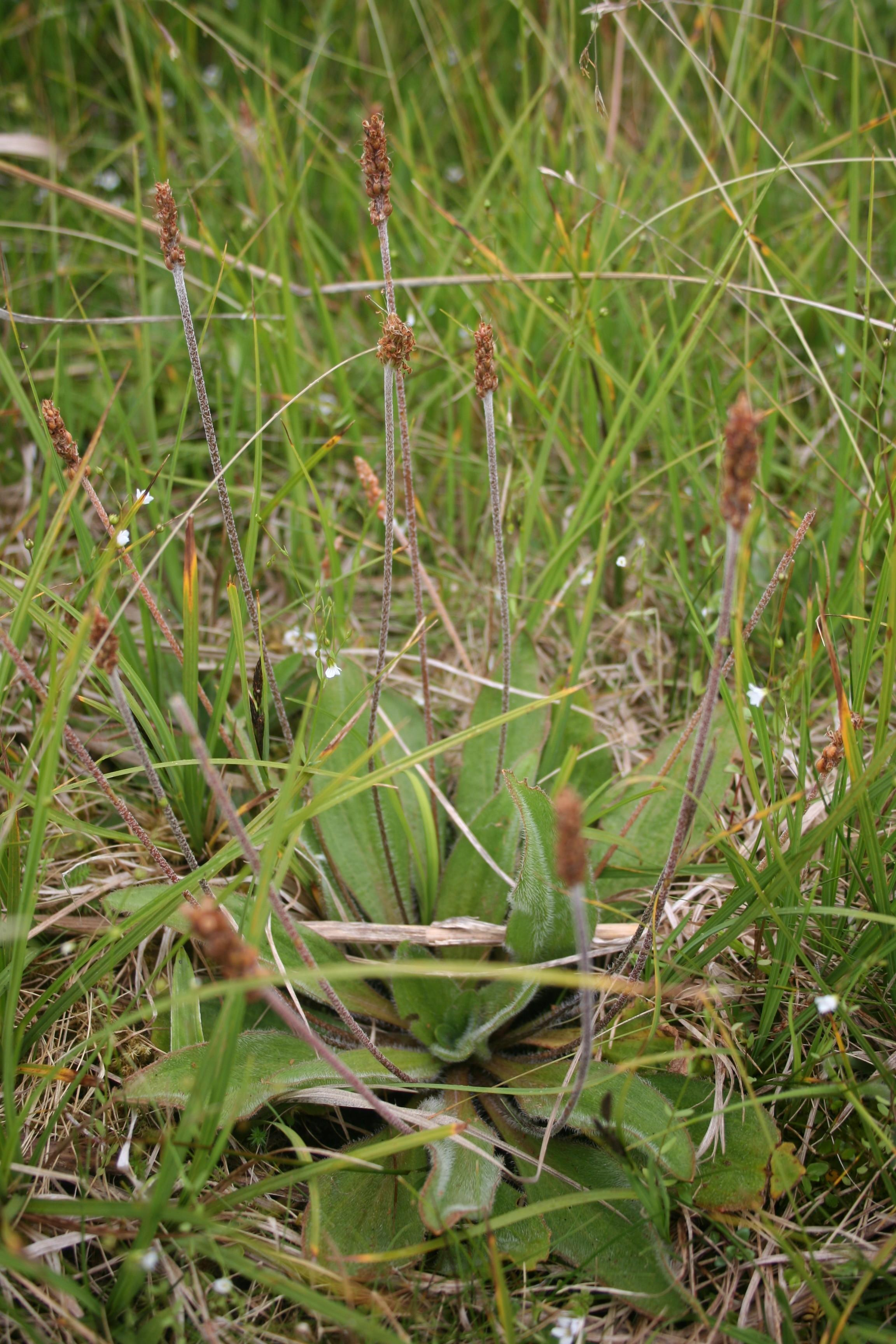
- Plantago udicola with fruiting capsules observed in Western Nelson, South Island New Zealand

Conservation status
- Not Threatened (NZ TCS)

Scientific classification
- Kingdom: Plantae
- Clade: Tracheophytes
- Clade: Angiosperms
- Clade: Eudicots
- Clade: Asterids
- Order: Lamiales
- Family: Plantaginaceae
- Genus: Plantago
- Species: P. udicola

Binomial name
- Plantago udicola Meudt & Garn.-Jones

= Plantago udicola =

Species of flowering plant in the plantain family

Plantago udicola is a species of flowering plant in the family Plantaginaceae that is endemic to New Zealand. Heidi Meudt and Philip Garnock-Jones described P. udicola in 2012. Plants of this species of plantain are perennial with a rosette habit, leaves widest above the middle, seeds uniform, ellipsoid and 1–4 per capsule, edges of bracts sparsely hairy, edges of sepals with isolated hairs at the apex only, and a chromosome number of 2n = 96 (dodecaploid). It is listed as Not Threatened.

== Taxonomy ==
Plantago udicola Meudt & Garn.-Jones is in the plant family Plantaginaceae. New Zealand botanists Heidi Meudt and Philip Garnock-Jones described P. udicola in 2012.

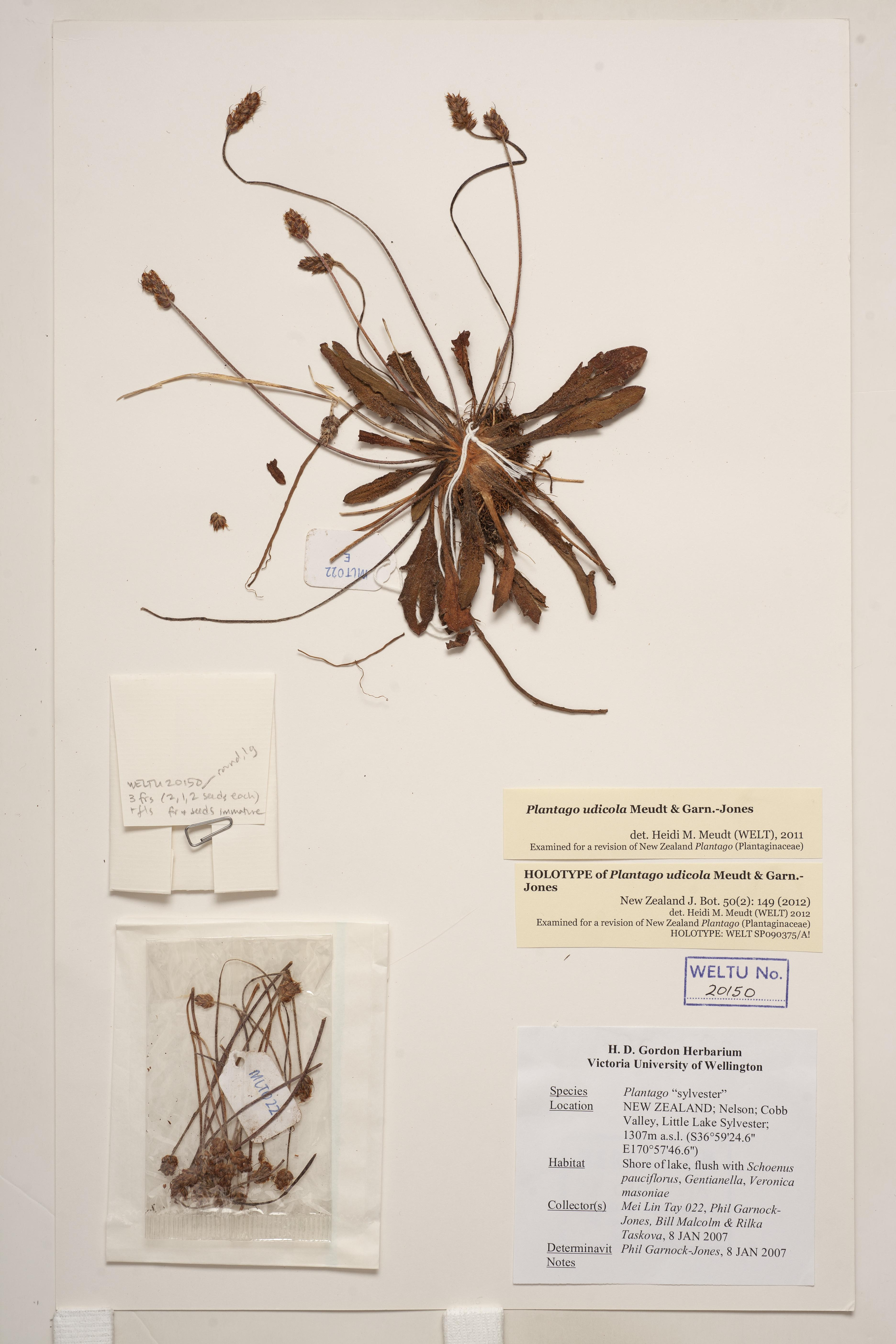
Te Papa holotype specimen of P. udicola

The type material was collected by Mei Lin Tay, Philip Garnock-Jones, William Malcolm & Rilka Taskova at Little Lake Sylvester, Western Nelson, South Island, New Zealand in 2007. The holotype is housed at the herbarium of Museum of New Zealand Te Papa Tongarewa (WELT).

Plantago udicola is morphologically most similar to P. raoulii, P. spathulata and P. picta.

P. udicola can be distinguished from these and other New Zealand Plantago species by a suite of characters including its 1–4 uniform, ellipsoid seeds, edges of bracts sparsely hairy, edges of sepals with isolated hairs at the apex only, and a chromosome number of 2n = 96.

P. udicola can be further distinguished from P. raoulii by the longer calyx (2.3–3.5 mm vs. 1.6–2.4 mm) and larger corolla lobes (1.2–2.9 mm long by 0.6–1.3 mm wide vs. 0.6–1.2 mm long by 0.3–0.7 mm wide).

== Description ==
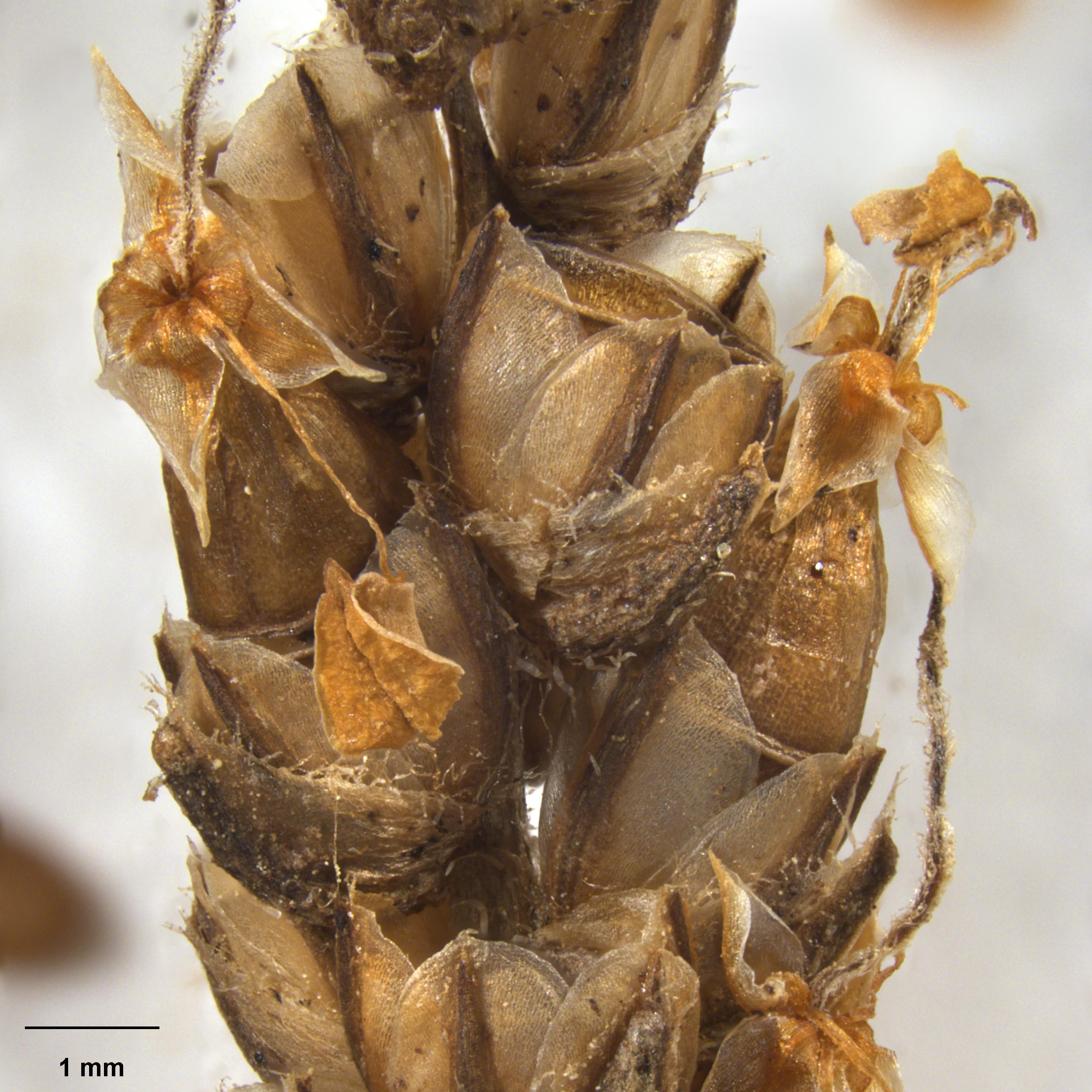
Close-up of flowers and fruits of P. udicola

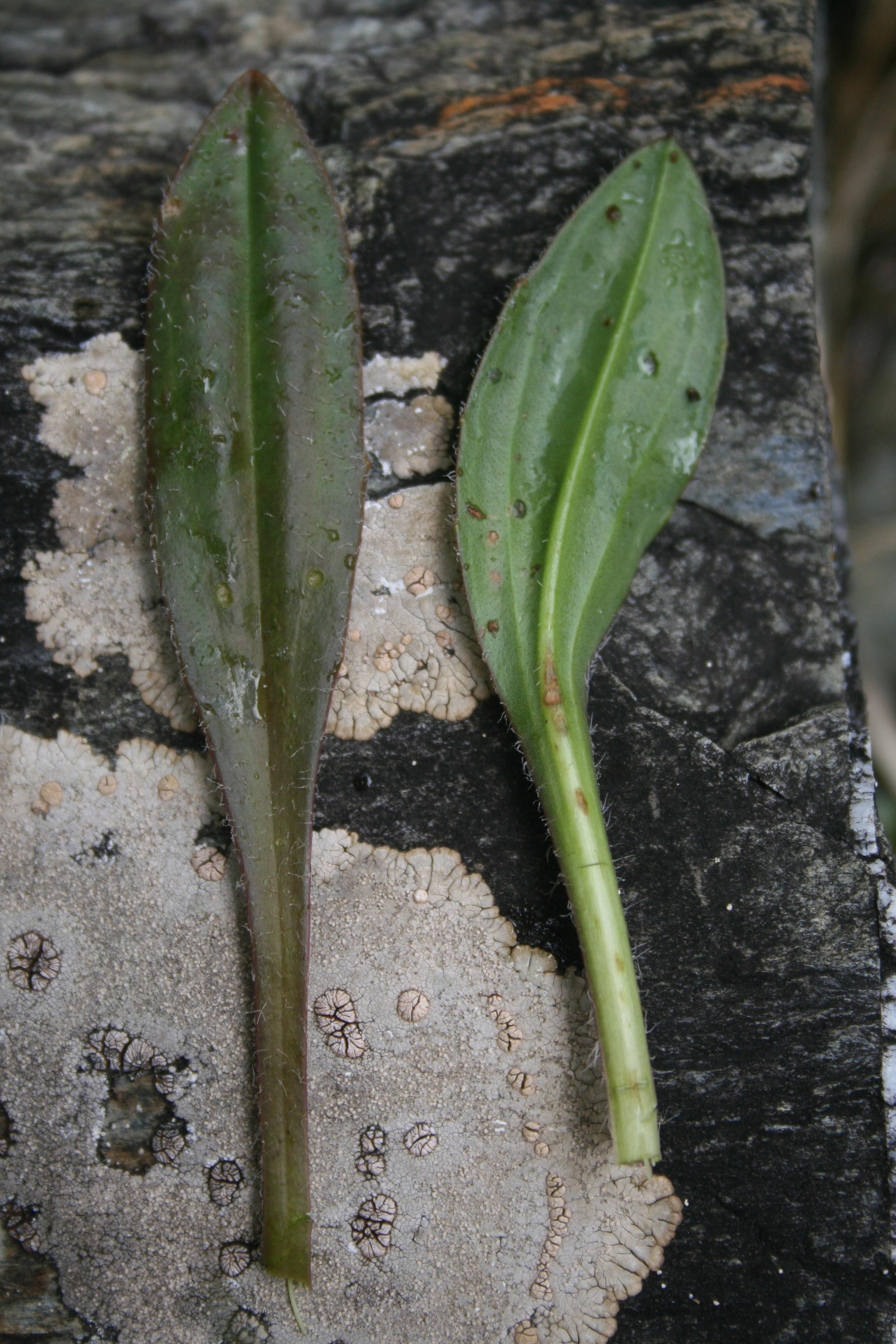
Leaves of P. udicola showing upper and lower leaf surfaces

Plantago udicola plants are small rosettes with a primary root up to 20 mm (0.79 in) thick, with up to 19 usually narrowly angular-obovate leaves, and with visible, short to long (<24 mm long), rust-coloured leaf axillary hairs in the basal rosette. The leaves have 1–5 veins, are 16–186 mm (0.63–7.3 in) long (including petiole) and up to 27 mm wide, usually not punctate, usually with isolated hairs or sparsely hairy on the upper surface, and usually glabrous, with isolated hairs or sparely hairy on the lower surface, particularly the midrib and edges. The leaf usually has an acute apex, and its edges are smooth or wavy or with 4–12 minute or large teeth, and with isolated hairs or sparsely hairy near the teeth. The petiole is usually distinguishable from the leaf lamina, and up to 75 mm long. Each rosette plant has up to 18 erect inflorescences which can be up to 266 mm (10.5 in) long. The scapes are smooth and sparsely to densely hairy. The spikes are usually linear-ovoid with 2–32 densely crowded flowers. Each flower has 1 small bract that is ovate, broadly ovate or very broadly ovate that is sparsely hairy on the margins and otherwise glabrous or with isolated hairs along the midrib. The calyx is 2.2–3.5 mm long, 1.4–2.9 mm wide, with isolated hairs at the apex, otherwise glabrous. The corolla tube is 1.8–3.7 mm long, corolla lobes 1.1–2.9 mm long, stamen filaments 2.0–7.5 mm long, anthers 1.5–2.2 mm long, and style 2.2–6.4 mm long and densely hairy. The ovary is 0.6–1.8 mm long, with 4–5 ovules. The fruit is a dry, dehiscent capsule with circumsessile dehiscence, usually ellipsoid, broadly ellipsoid, or ovoid, widest at or below middle, 2.1–4.7 mm long and 1.4–3.2 mm wide. Each capsule has 1–4 rust, brown or dark brown, uniform, rounded seeds 1.1–2.5 mm long and 0.6–1.4 mm wide, usually ellipsoid.

Plantago udicola flowers from November to February and fruits from about December to June.

The chromosome number of Plantago udicola is 2n=96.

== Distribution and habitat ==
Plantago udicola is a plantain that is endemic to the North Island and South Island of New Zealand.

In the North Island P. udicola is found in the Volcanic Plateau region only. In the South Island it is found in the Western Nelson, Sounds Nelson, Westland, Canterbury, Otago and Fiordland regions.

P. udicola grows in wet or damp ground in bogs, streams or hollows on silt or peaty soil in subalpine to alpine tussock or herbfields from 580 to 1,600 m (1,900 to 5,250 ft) above sea level.

== Phylogeny ==
in phylogenetic analyses of Australasian species of Plantago using standard DNA sequencing markers (nuclear ribosomal DNA, chloroplast DNA, and mitochondrial DNA regions) and amplified fragment length polymorphisms (AFLPs), Plantago udicola was moderately to strongly supported as being closely related to the mainland New Zealand species P. spathulata, P. picta and P. raoulii.

Similarly, the sole individual of P. udicola was closely related to individuals of P. raoulii, P. spathulata and P. picta in another phylogenetic study focusing on Plantago species throughout the world using whole chloroplast genomes. Finally, the species was not included in another phylogenetic studies focusing on oceanic island Plantago species using standard DNA sequencing markers.

== Conservation status ==
Plantago udicola is listed as Not Threatened in the most recent assessment (2017–2018) of the New Zealand Threatened Classification for plants.

== Gallery ==
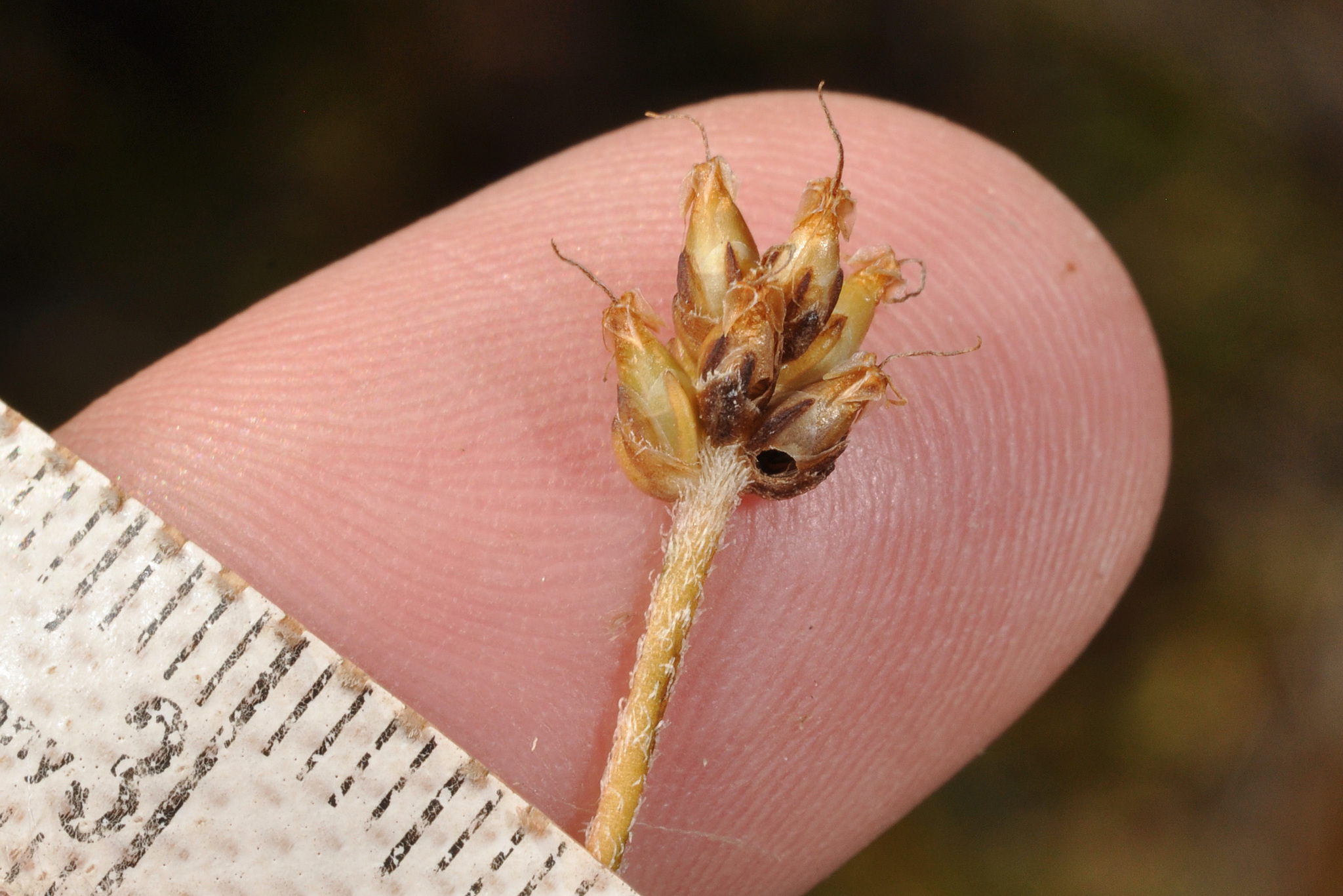
Close up of the fruiting capsules of Plantago udicola; note the sparsely hairy edges of the bracts

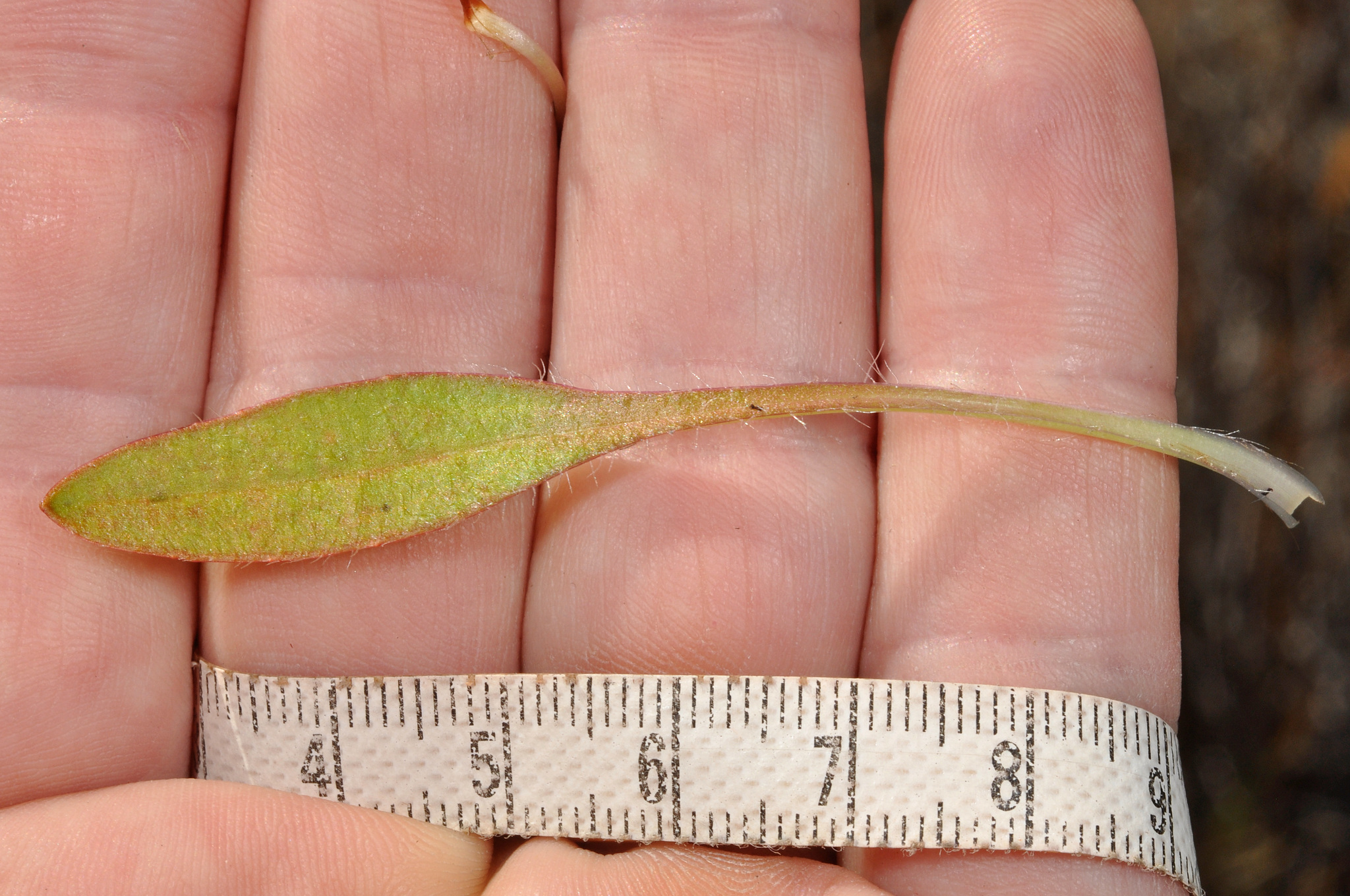
Rosette leaf of Plantago udicola

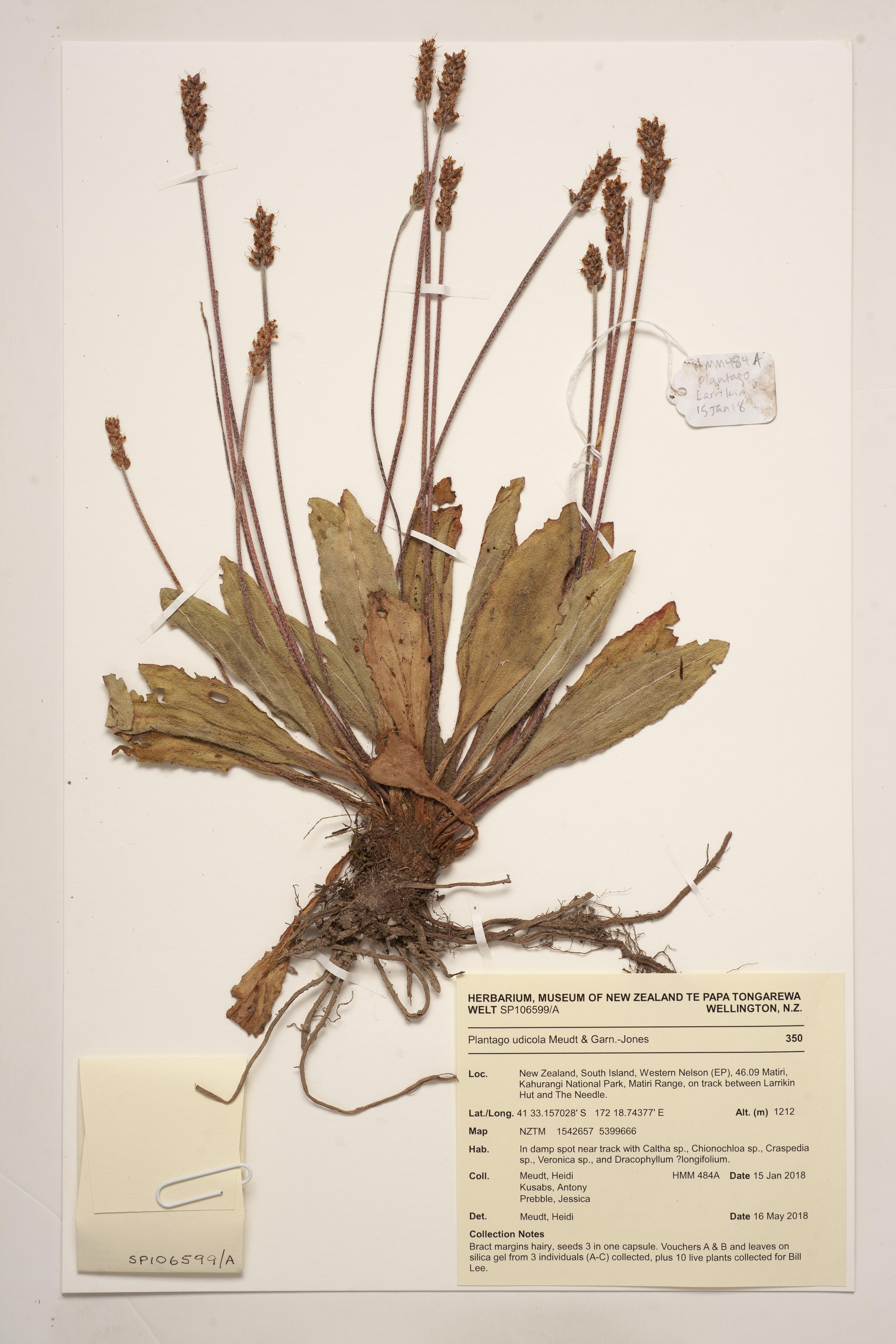
Te Papa herbarium specimen collected in Kahurangi National Park, South Island, New Zealand, in 2018

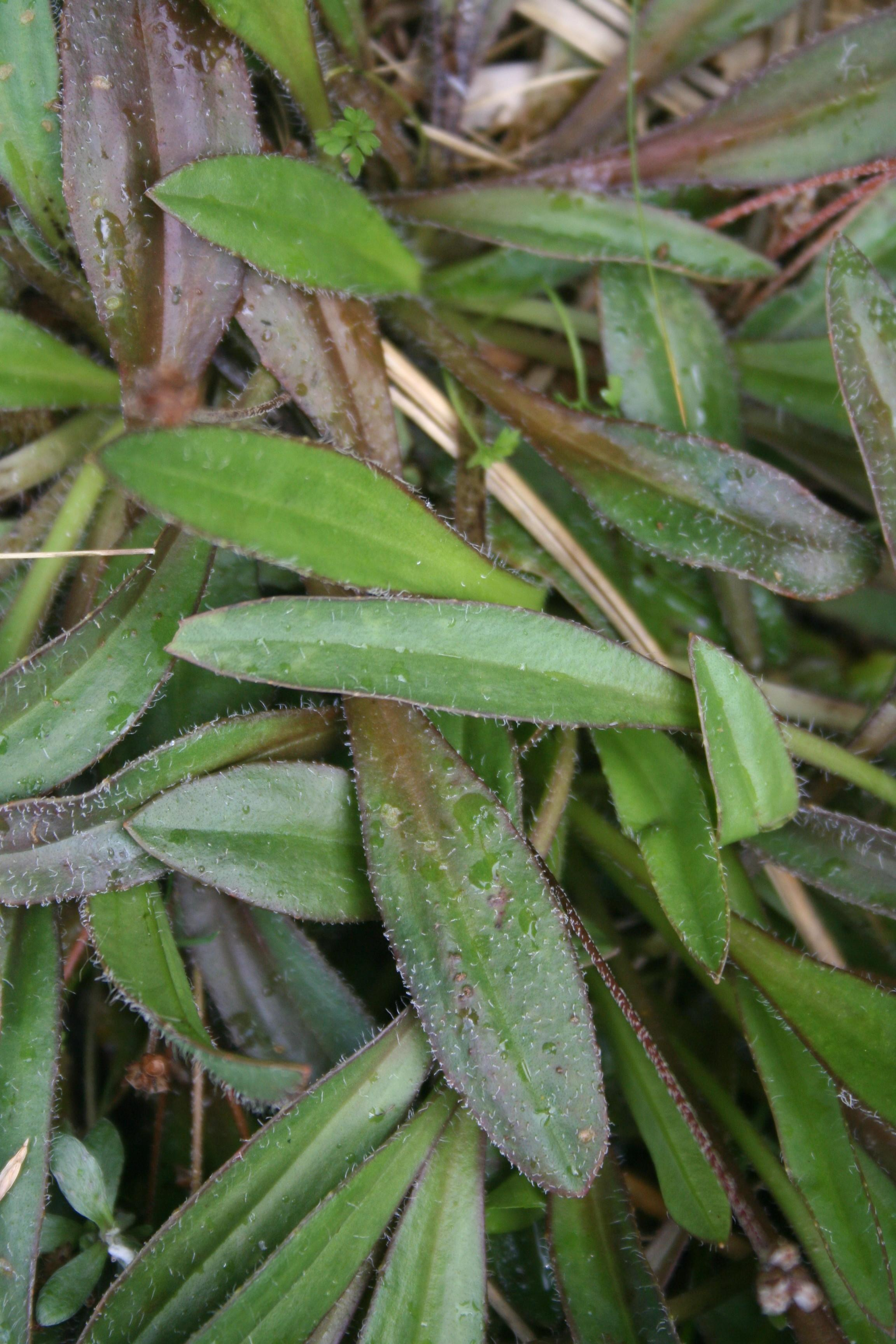
Leaves of P. udicola
