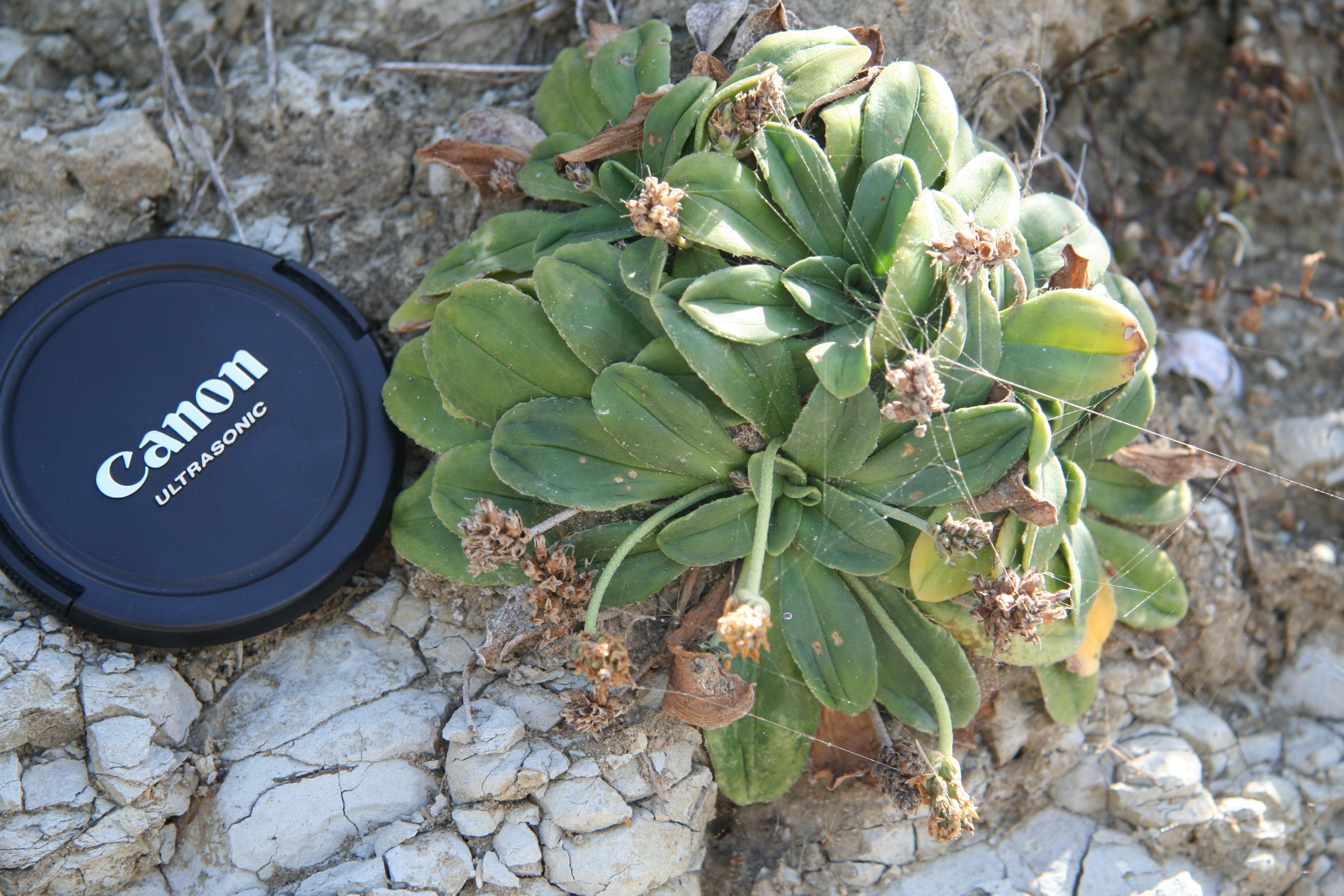
- Plantago picta observed near East Cape, North Island, New Zealand in 2011

Conservation status
- Naturally Uncommon (NZ TCS)

Scientific classification
- Kingdom: Plantae
- Clade: Tracheophytes
- Clade: Angiosperms
- Clade: Eudicots
- Clade: Asterids
- Order: Lamiales
- Family: Plantaginaceae
- Genus: Plantago
- Species: P. picta

Binomial name
- Plantago picta Colenso

Synonyms
- Plantago spathulata subsp. picta (Colenso) W.R.Sykes

= Plantago picta =

Species of flowering plant in the plantain family

Plantago picta is a species of flowering plant in the family Plantaginaceae that is endemic to New Zealand. William Colenso described P. picta in 1890. Plants of this species of plantain are perennial with a rosette habit, leaves widest above the middle, up to five ellipsoid seeds per capsule, and bracts with hairs along the edges but otherwise glabrous. Its conservation status is At Risk – Naturally Uncommon.

== Taxonomy ==
Plantago picta Colenso is in the plant family Plantaginaceae. New Zealand botanist William Colenso described P. picta in 1890.

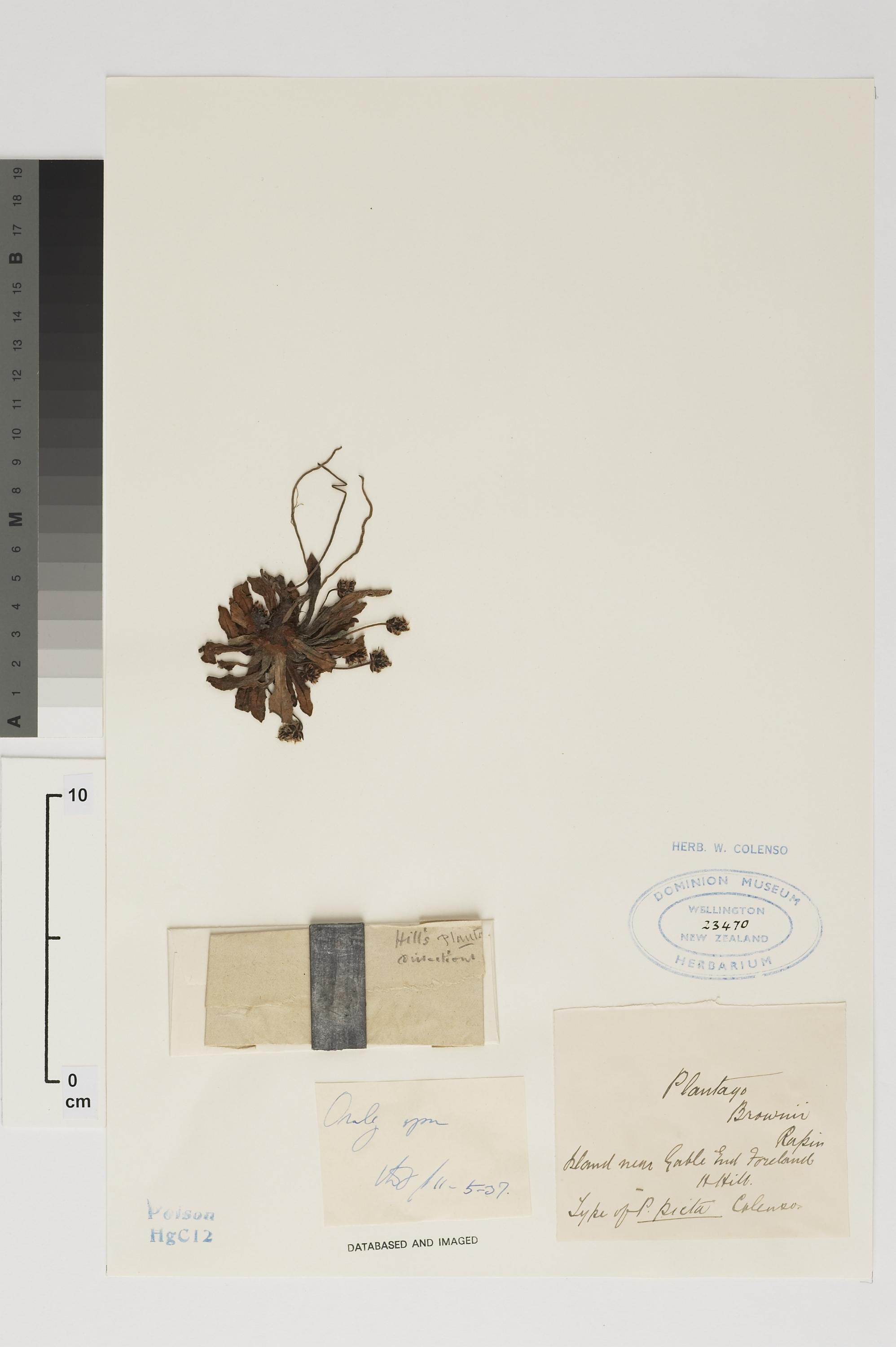
Lectotype of Plantago picta at the Te Papa herbarium

The type material was collected by H. Hill on "Island near Gable End Foreland", North Island, New Zealand. The lectotype was designated by Heidi Meudt and is housed at the herbarium (WELT) of the Museum of New Zealand Te Papa Tongarewa with an isolectotype at the herbarium (K) of the Royal Botanical Gardens, Kew.

Plantago picta is morphologically most similar to P. spathulata, P. raoullii and P. udicola. P. picta and P. spathulata were once considered subspecies.

P. picta can be distinguished from P. spathulata by the length of the hairs on the on bract edges (minute and 0.1–0.3 mm long vs. long and obvious and 0.3–1.1 mm long); the width of the darkened area on sepal (>50% vs. <50% total sepal width); and size classes of seeds (of two different size classes vs. of one uniform size).

Plantago picta E.Morris was described in 1901 and is an illegitimate name, since it was published after P. picta Colenso, and is a synonym for a South American plant, P. patagonica.

== Description ==
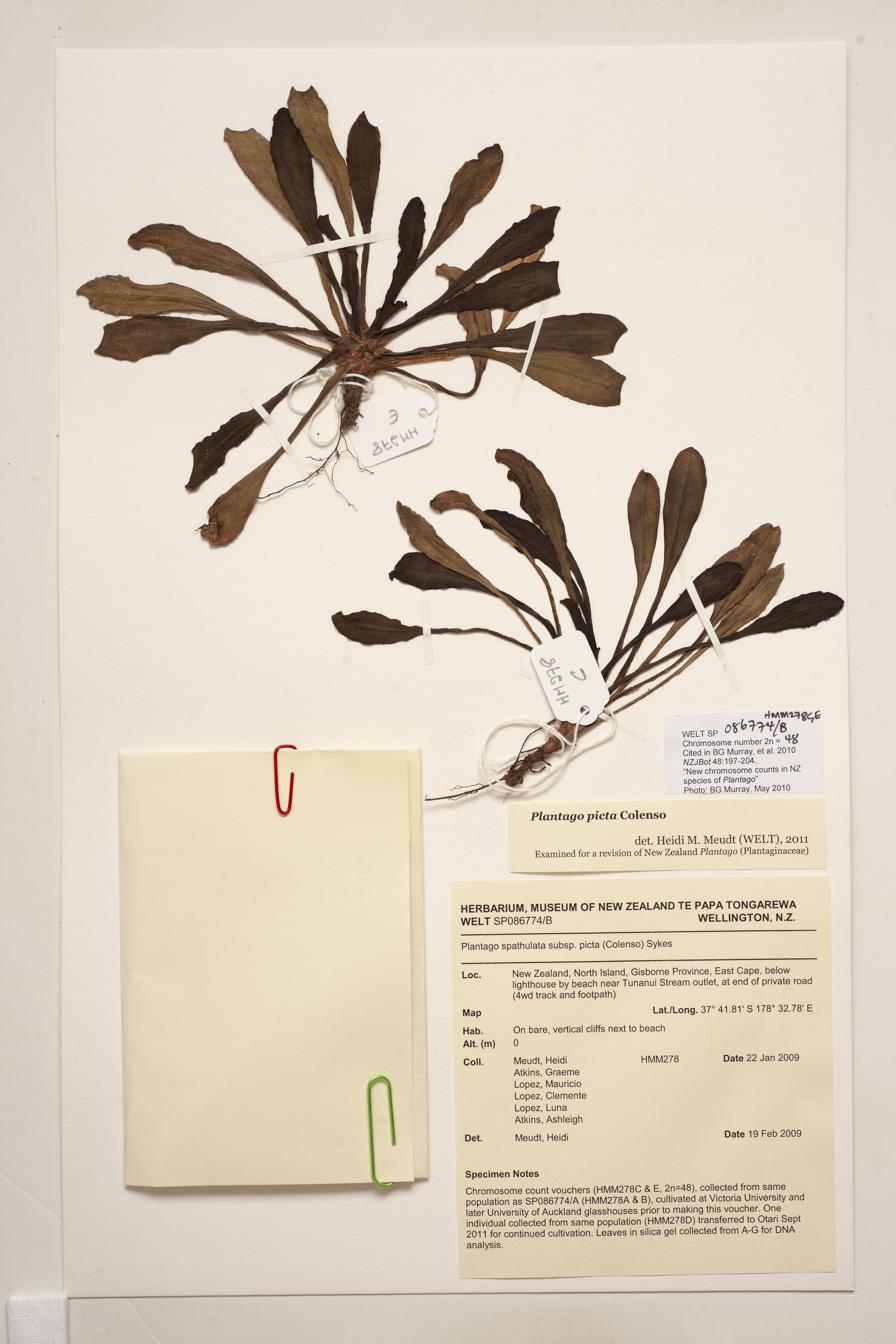
Te Papa herbarium specimen of P. picta collected at East Cape, North Island, New Zealand in 2011

Plantago picta plants are small rosettes with a primary root up to 13 mm thick, with up to 50 usually narrowly obovate or obovate leaves, and with visible, short (<15 mm long), rust-coloured leaf axillary hairs in the basal rosette. The leaves have 1–3 veins, are 10–93 mm long (including petiole) and up to 28 mm wide, not punctate, usually glabrous or with patchy, isolated hairs or sparsely hairy on the upper surface, and usually glabrous or with isolated hairs on the midrib of the lower surface. The leaf usually has an obtuse apex, and its edges are smooth or wavy or with up to 10 minute or small teeth, and with isolated hairs or sparsely hairy especially near the teeth. The petiole is sometimes distinguishable from the leaf lamina, and up to 36 mm long. Each rosette plant has up to 21erect inflorescences which can be up to 210 mm long. The scapes are smooth and sparsely to densely hairy. The spikes are usually linear-ovoid with 5–30 densely crowded flowers. Each flower has 1 small bract that is ovate, broadly ovate or very broadly ovate and sparsely hairy along the edges. The calyx is 2.6–3.5 mm long, 1.8–3.8 mm wide, and sparsely hairy on the lobe edges. The corolla tube is 1.4–3.3 mm long, corolla lobes 1.3–2.2 mm long, stamen filaments 3.2–7.5 mm long, anthers 1.9–2.3 mm long, and style 2.7–6.3 mm long and densely hairy. The ovary is 0.8–2.1 mm long, with 4 or 5 ovules. The fruit is a dry, dehiscent capsule with circumsessile dehiscence, usually ellipsoid, globose, anbular obovoid or broadly angular obovoid, widest at middle, 2.1–4.3 mm long and 1.6–3.0 mm wide. Each capsule has 2–5 rust, brown or dark brown seeds 0.7–2.3 mm long, of two size classes, usually ellipsoid, broadly ellipsoid or globose with rounded edges.

Plantago picta flowers from December to January and fruits from December to March.

The chromosome number of Plantago picta is 2n=48.

== Distribution and habitat ==
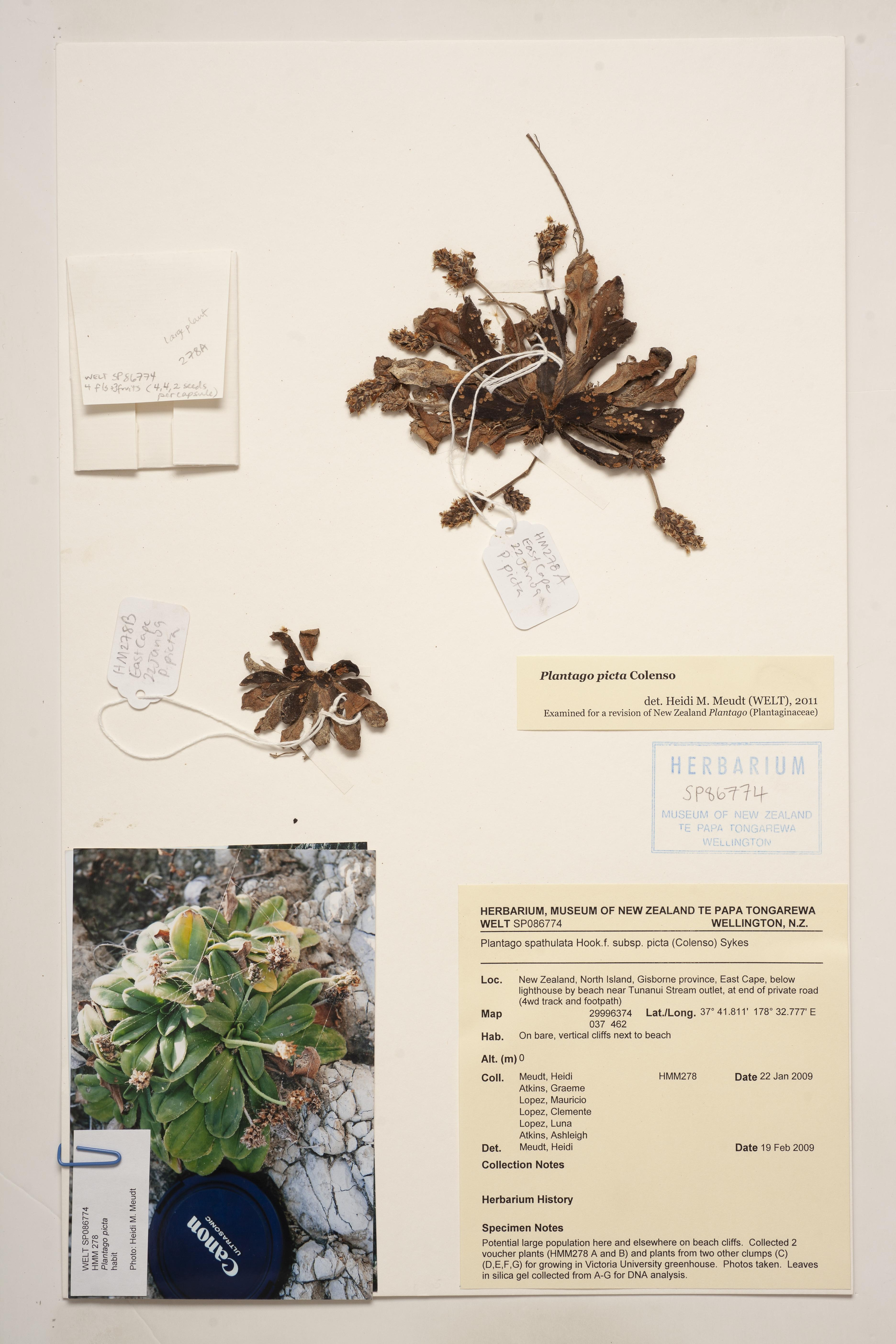
Te Papa herbarium specimen of P. picta collected in 2011 at East Cape, North Island, New Zealand

Plantago picta is a plantain that is endemic to the Gisborne region of the North Island of New Zealand.

It grows on bare coastal cliffs made of sandstone or mudstone from 0–50 m above sea level.

== Phylogeny ==
in phylogenetic analyses of Australasian species of Plantago using standard DNA sequencing markers (nuclear ribosomal DNA, chloroplast DNA, and mitochondrial DNA regions) and amplified fragment length polymorphisms (AFLPs), Plantago picta was moderately to strongly supported as being closely related to the mainland New Zealand species P. spathulata, P. raoulii and P. udicola.

Similarly, the sole individual of P. picta was closely related to individuals of P. raoulii, P. spathulata and P. udicola in another phylogenetic study focusing on Plantago species throughout the world using whole chloroplast genomes. Finally, the species was not included in another phylogenetic studies focusing on oceanic island Plantago species using standard DNA sequencing markers.

== Conservation status ==
Plantago picta is listed as At Risk – Naturally Uncommon in the most recent assessment (2017–2018) of the New Zealand Threatened Classification for plants.
