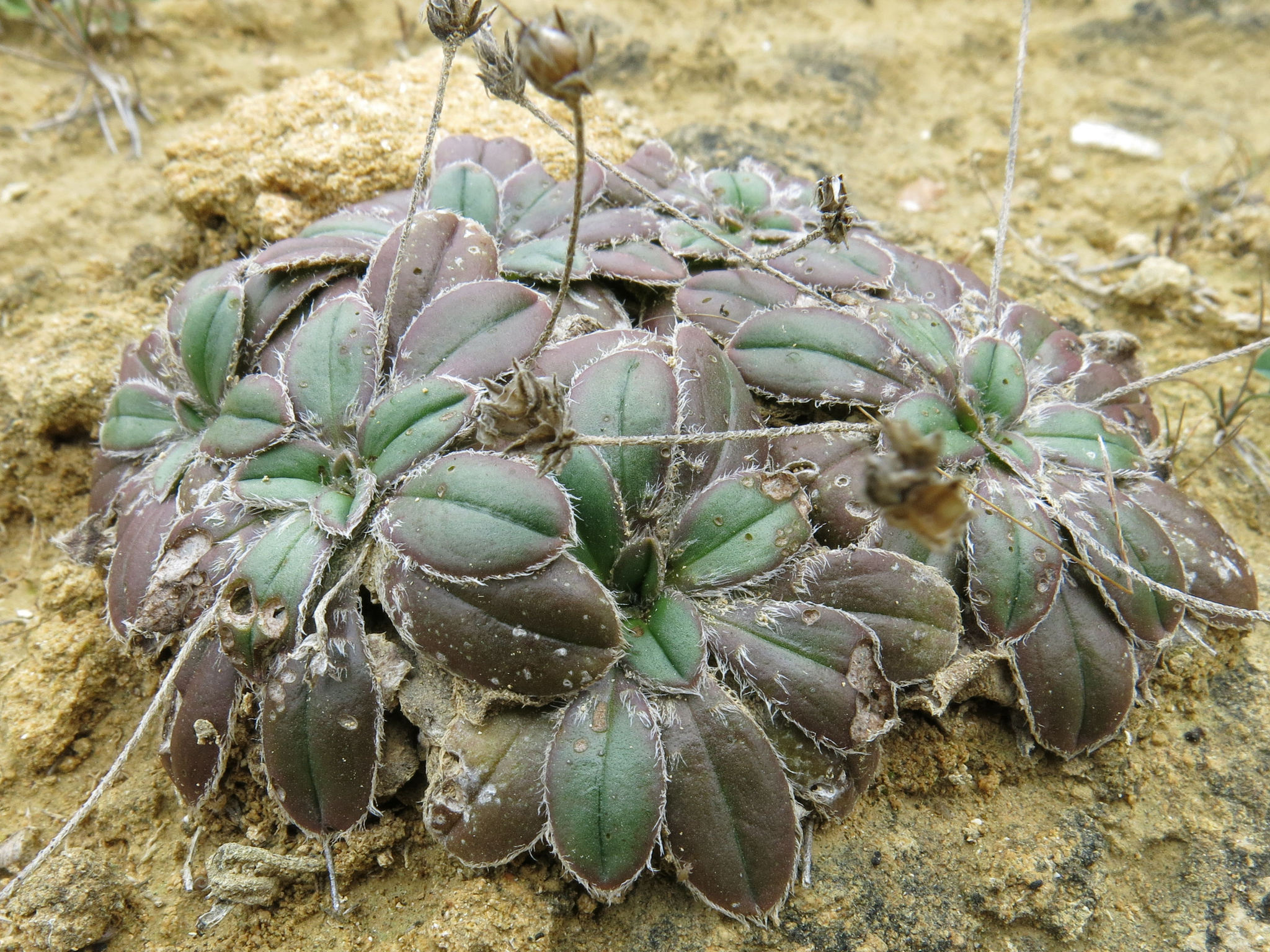
- Plantago spathulata rosette plants observed on the South Island, New Zealand

Conservation status
- Not Threatened (NZ TCS)

Scientific classification
- Kingdom: Plantae
- Clade: Tracheophytes
- Clade: Angiosperms
- Clade: Eudicots
- Clade: Asterids
- Order: Lamiales
- Family: Plantaginaceae
- Genus: Plantago
- Species: P. spathulata

Binomial name
- Plantago spathulata Hook.f.

= Plantago spathulata =

Species of flowering plant

Plantago spathulata (also known as kaupārerarera or pārerarera in te reo Māori) is a species of flowering plant in the family Plantaginaceae that is endemic to New Zealand. Joseph Dalton Hooker described P. spathulata in 1853. Plants of this species of plantain are perennial with a rosette habit, leaves widest above the middle, up to 4 ellipsoid seeds per capsule, bracts with hairs along the edges, and midribs of bracts and sepals hairy. It is listed as Not Threatened.

== Taxonomy ==
Plantago spathulata Hook.f. is in the plant family Plantaginaceae. Joseph Dalton Hooker described P. spathulata in Part III of his Flora Antarctica series, Flora Novae-Zelandiae 1853. It is known in te reo Māori as kaupārerarera or pārerarera.

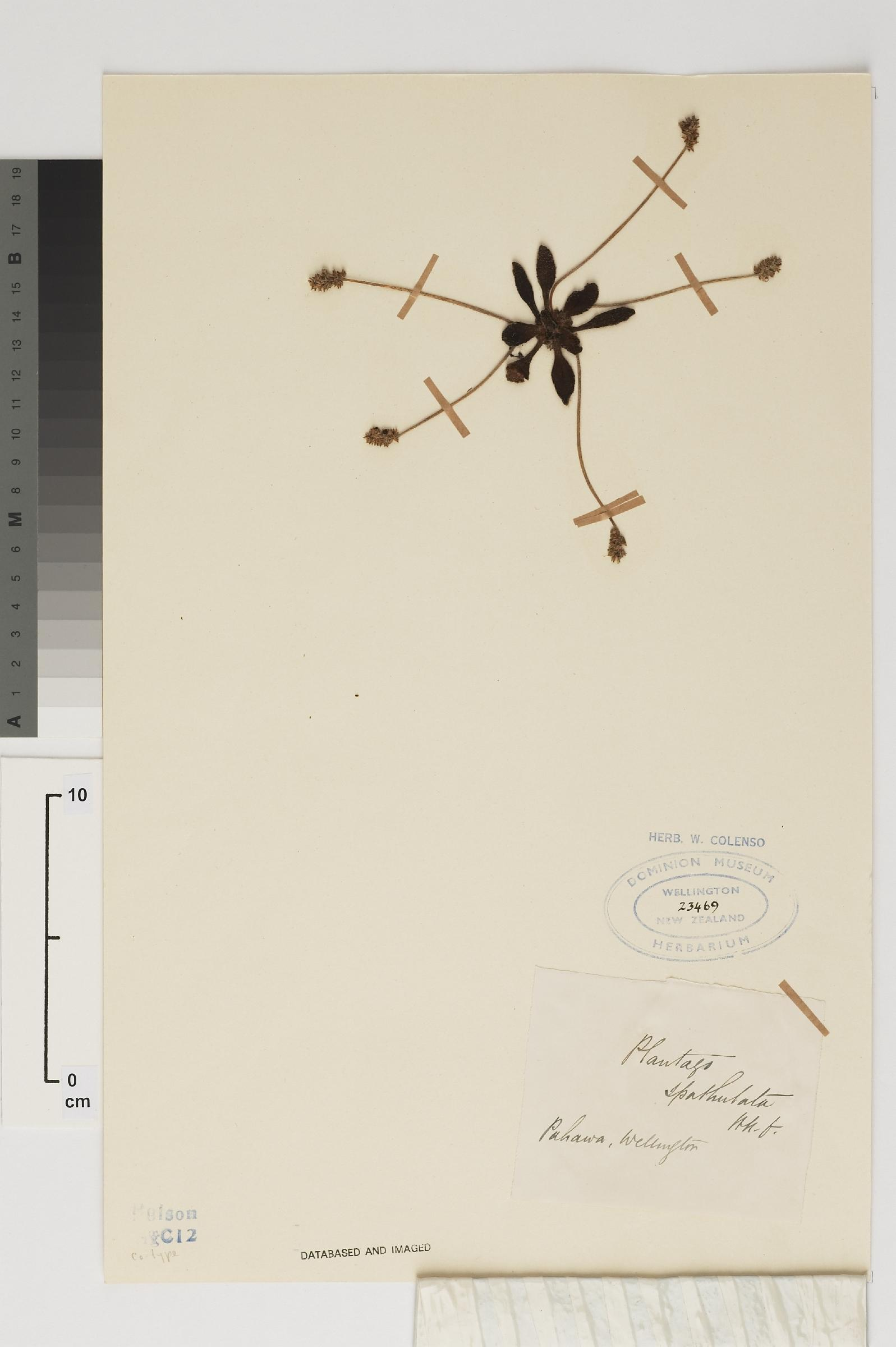
Possible isolectotype of P. spathulata at the Te Papa herbarium

The type material was collected by William Colenso along the eastern coast of the North Island, New Zealand. The lectotype was designated by Heidi Meudt and is housed at the herbarium of the Royal Botanical Gardens, Kew, with possible isolectotypes at the same herbarium and the Museum of New Zealand Te Papa Tongarewa (WELT).

Plantago spathulata is morphologically most similar to P. picta, P. raoullii and P. udicola. P. spathulata and P. picta were once considered subspecies.

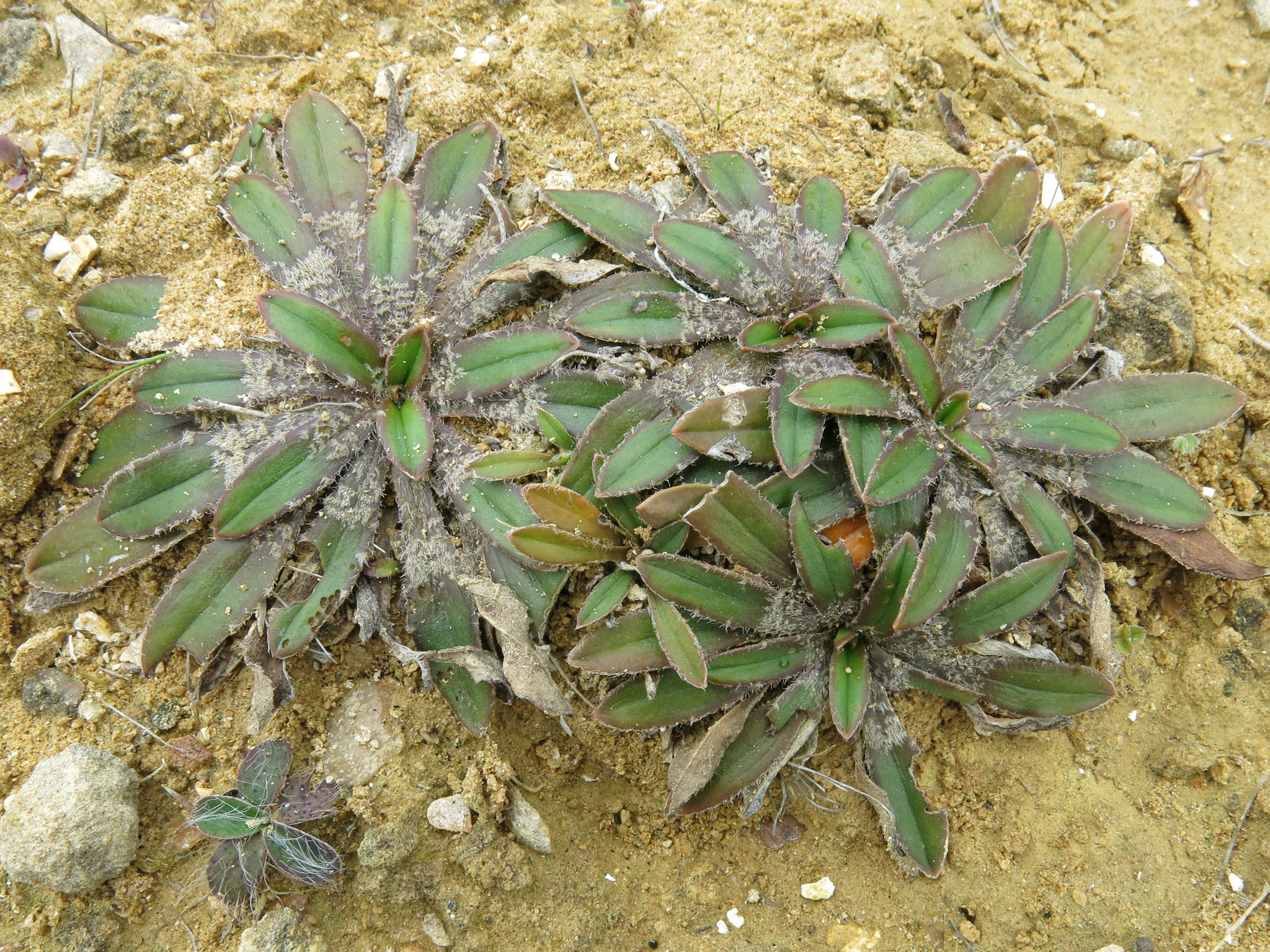
Rosettes of Plantago spathulata in a herbfield habitat, on thin soils above limestone bluffs on the South Island, New Zealand

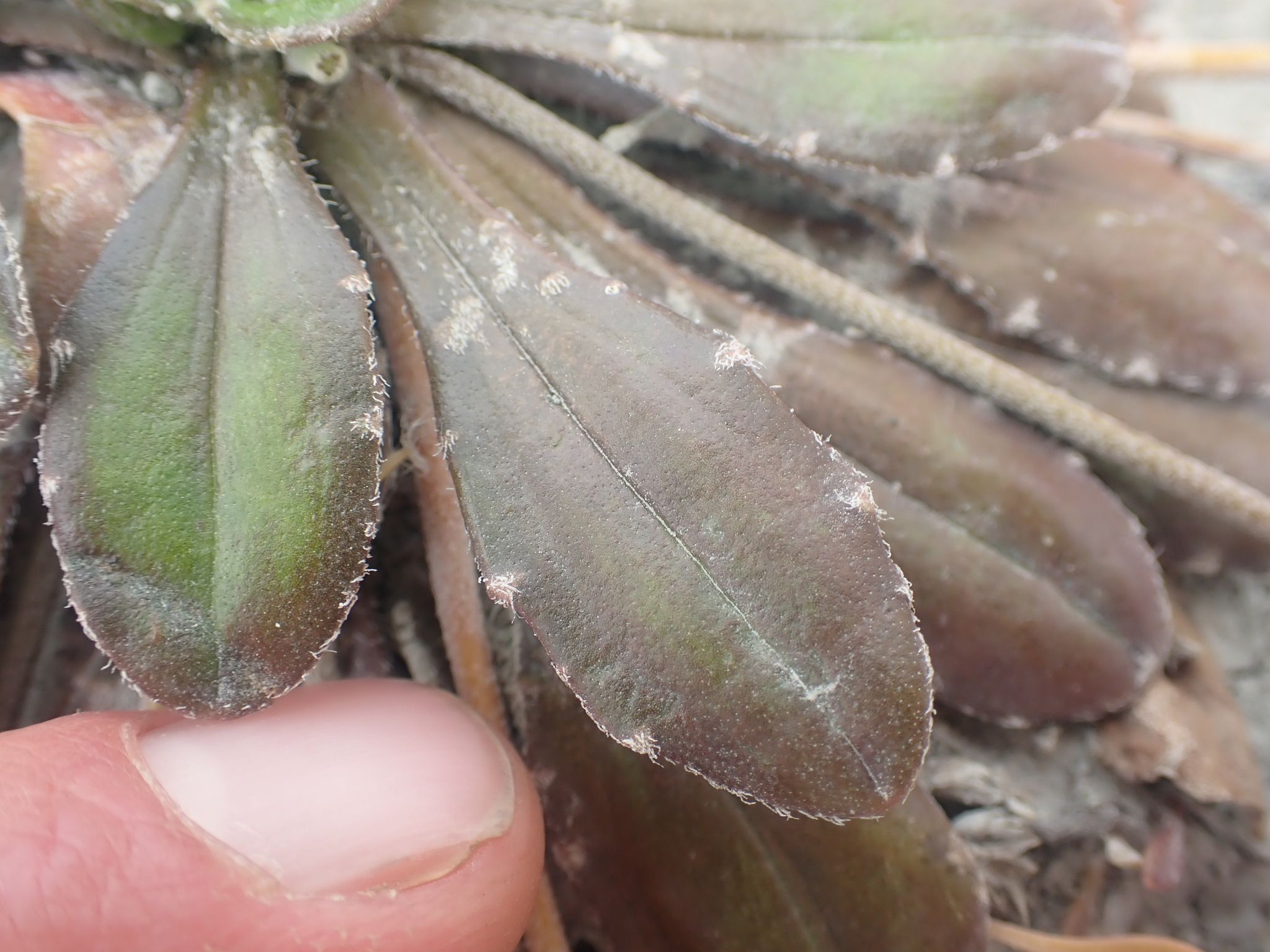
Close up of leaves of P. spathulata from Cape Campbell on the northeastern coast of the South Island, New Zealand

P. spathulata is distinguished from these three species by the sparsely hairy bract margins (vs. glabrous), hairy bract and sepal midribs (vs. glabrous), and the presence of 1–4 uniform ellipsoid seeds in each capsule (vs 2–5 seeds in 2 or 3 size classes).

P. spathulata can be further distinguished from P. picta by the length of the hairs on the on bract edges (long and obvious and 0.3–1.1mm long vs. minute and 0.1–0.3 mm long); the width of the darkened area on sepal (<50% vs. >50% total sepal width); and size classes of seeds (of one uniform size vs. of two different size classes).

== Description ==
Plantago spathulata plants are small rosettes with a primary root up to 13 mm thick, with up to 28 usually narrowly angular-ovate or narrowly obovate leaves, and with visible, short (<10 mm long), rust-coloured leaf axillary hairs in the basal rosette. The leaves have 1–3 veins (rarely up to 5), are 18–118 mm long (including petiole) and up to 29 mm wide, not punctate, with patchy, isolated hairs or sparsely or densely hairy on the upper surface, usually glabrous or with isolated hairs or sparsely hairy on the lower surfaces. The leaf usually has an acute or obtuse apex, and its edges are smooth or wavy or with up to 12 minute teeth, and sparsely or densely hairy especially near the teeth. The petiole is usually distinguishable from the leaf lamina, and up to 27 mm long. Each rosette plant has up to 22 erect inflorescences which can be up to 212 mm (8.3 in) long. The scapes are smooth and sparsely to densely hairy. The spikes are usually linear-ovoid with 3–26 densely crowded flowers. Each flower has 1 small bract that is ovate, broadly ovate or very broadly ovate and with isolated hairs or sparsely hairy along the edges and midrib. The calyx is 2.1–4.0 mm long, 1.4–4.7 mm wide, and sparsely hairy on the lobe edges and midrib. The corolla tube is 1.7–3.3 mm long, corolla lobes 1.2–2.0 mm long, stamen filaments 3.4–4.6 mm long, anthers 1.7–2.2 mm long, and style 4.0–7.9 mm long and densely hairy. The ovary is 0.7–1.2 mm long, with 3 or 4 ovules. The fruit is a dry, dehiscent capsule with circumsessile dehiscence, usually broadly ellipsoid, ellipsiod, ovoid or broadly ovoid, widest at or below middle, 1.8–4.2 mm long and 0.6–2.3 mm wide. Each capsule has 1–4 uniform rust, brown or dark brown seeds 1.1–2.2 mm long, ellipsoid or broadly ellipsoid.

Plantago spathulata flowers from September to April and fruits from October to May.

The chromosome number of Plantago spathulata is 2n=48.

== Distribution and habitat ==
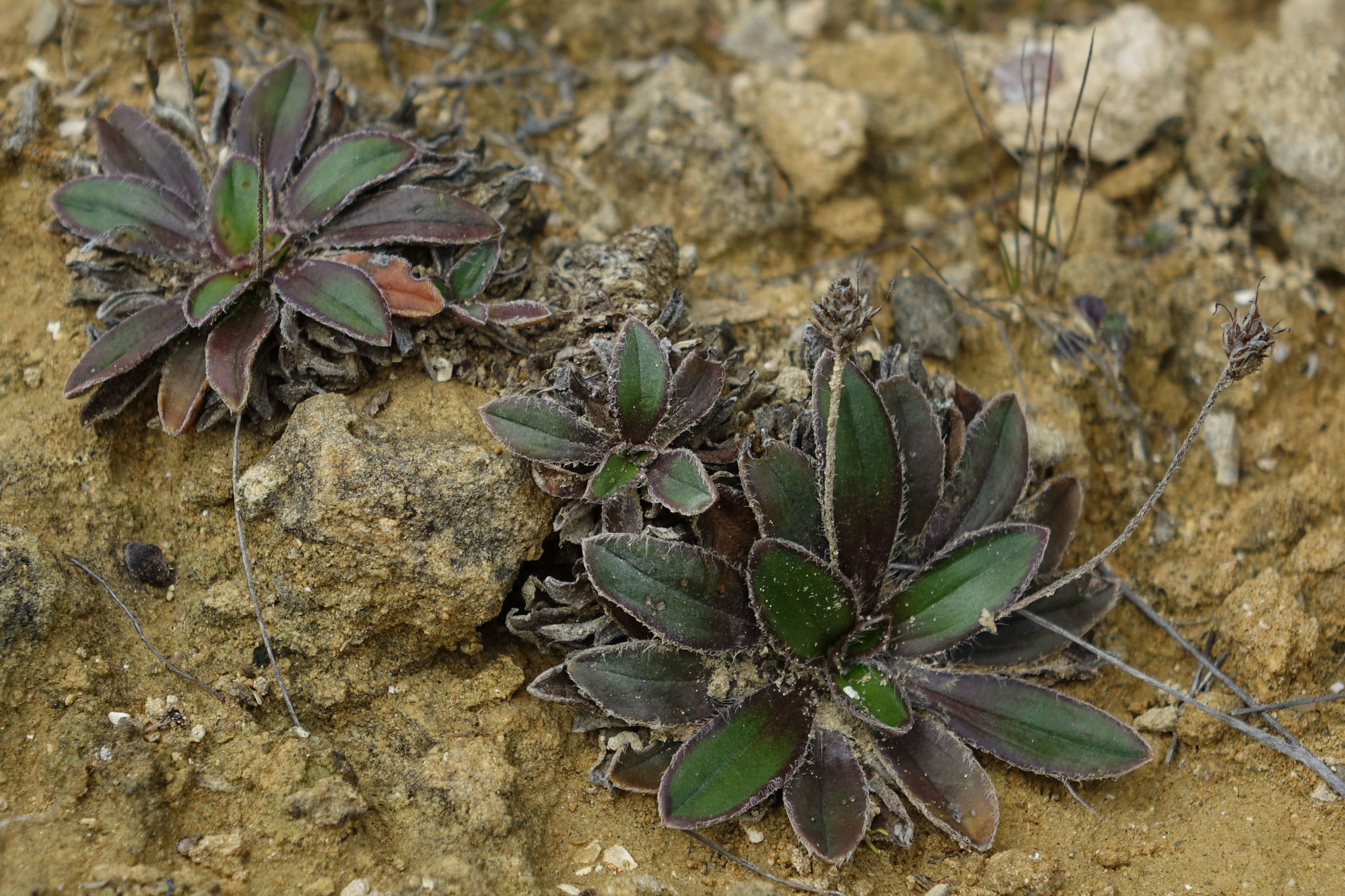
Plantago spathulata rosettes on limestone pavement substrate in north Otago, South Island, New Zealand.

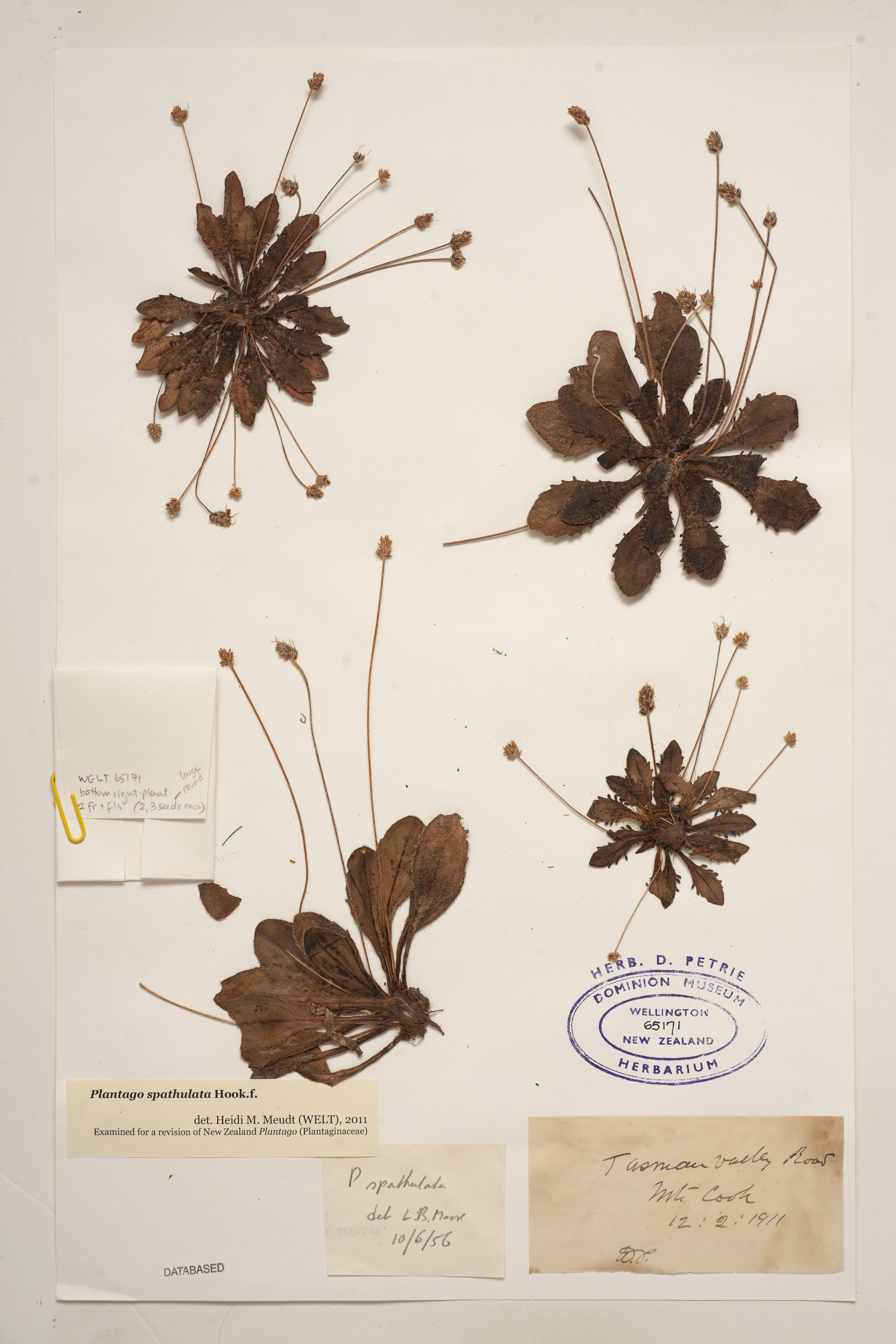
Herbarium specimen of P. spathulata at Te Papa Herbarium collected by Donald Petrie in 1911 near Mt Cook, South Island, New Zealand

Plantago spathulata is a plantain that is endemic to the North and South Islands of New Zealand.

In the North Island it is found in the Southern North Island region, whereas on the South Island it is found in the Western Nelson, Marlborough, Canterbury, Otago and Southland regions.

It grows in grasslands, herbfields, on rocky, coastal, exposed, dry or wet areas, on multiple substrates such as limestone, mudstone, clay, sand, gravel or silt, from 0 to 1,070 m (3,510 ft) m above sea level.

== Phylogeny ==
in phylogenetic analyses of Australasian species of Plantago using standard DNA sequencing markers (nuclear ribosomal DNA, chloroplast DNA, and mitochondrial DNA regions) and amplified fragment length polymorphisms (AFLPs), Plantago spathulata was moderately to strongly supported as being closely related to the mainland New Zealand species P. picta, P. raoulii and P. udicola.

Similarly, the sole individual of P. spathulata was closely related to individuals of P. picta, P. raoulii and P. udicola in another phylogenetic study focusing on Plantago species throughout the world using whole chloroplast genomes. Finally, the species was not included in another phylogenetic studies focusing on oceanic island Plantago species using standard DNA sequencing markers.

== Conservation status ==
Plantago spathulata is listed as Not Threatened in the most recent assessment (2017–2018) of the New Zealand Threatened Classification for plants.
