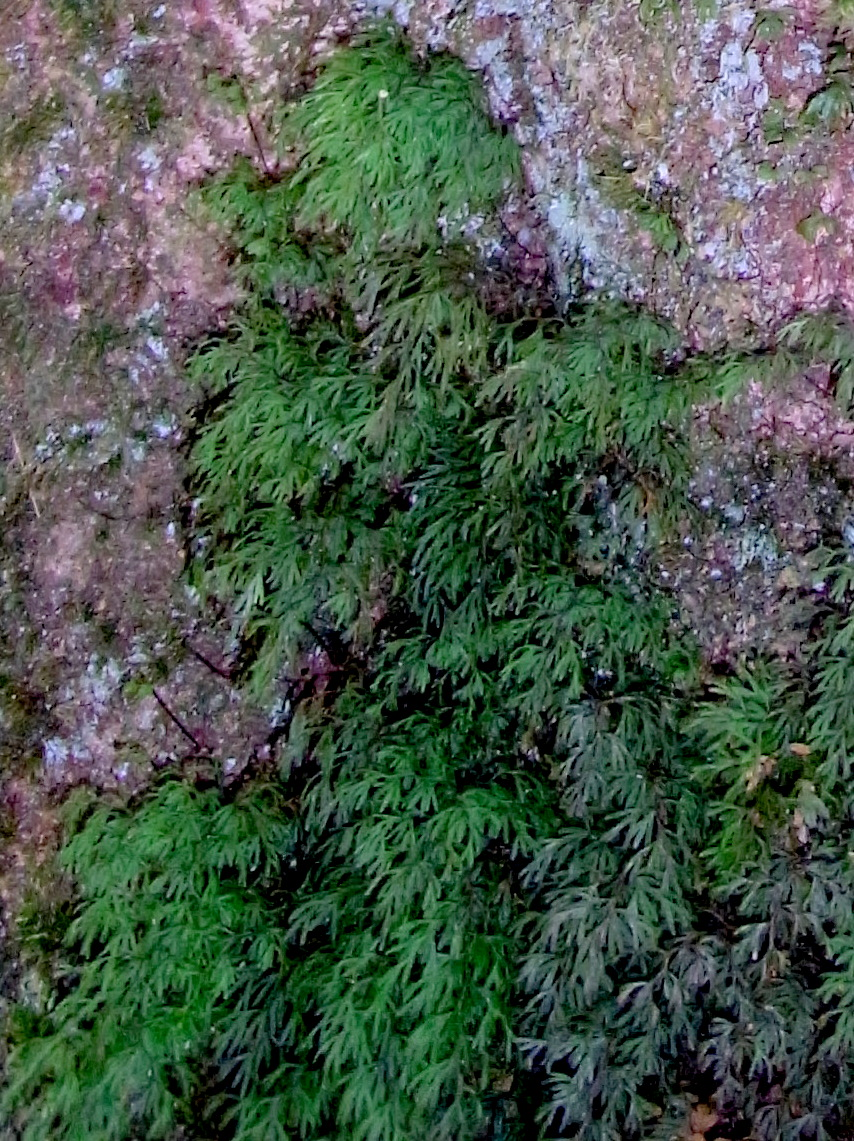

Scientific classification
- Kingdom: Plantae
- Clade: Tracheophytes
- Division: Polypodiophyta
- Class: Polypodiopsida
- Order: Hymenophyllales
- Family: Hymenophyllaceae
- Genus: Hymenophyllum
- Species: H. howense

Binomial name
- Hymenophyllum howense Brownlie (1960)

= Hymenophyllum howense =

Species of fern

Hymenophyllum howense is a fern in the family Hymenophyllaceae. The specific epithet refers to the locality of occurrence.

== Description ==
The fern has a wiry, creeping rhizome, with adpressed, reddish brown hairs. Its 3- or 4-pinnatifid fronds combine a 2–7 cm long stipe with a triangular-ovate lamina 4–6 cm long and 2–5 cm wide.

== Distribution and habitat ==
The fern is endemic to Australia’s subtropical Lord Howe Island in the Tasman Sea; it occurs in cloud forest on and around the summits of Mounts Lidgbird and Gower.
