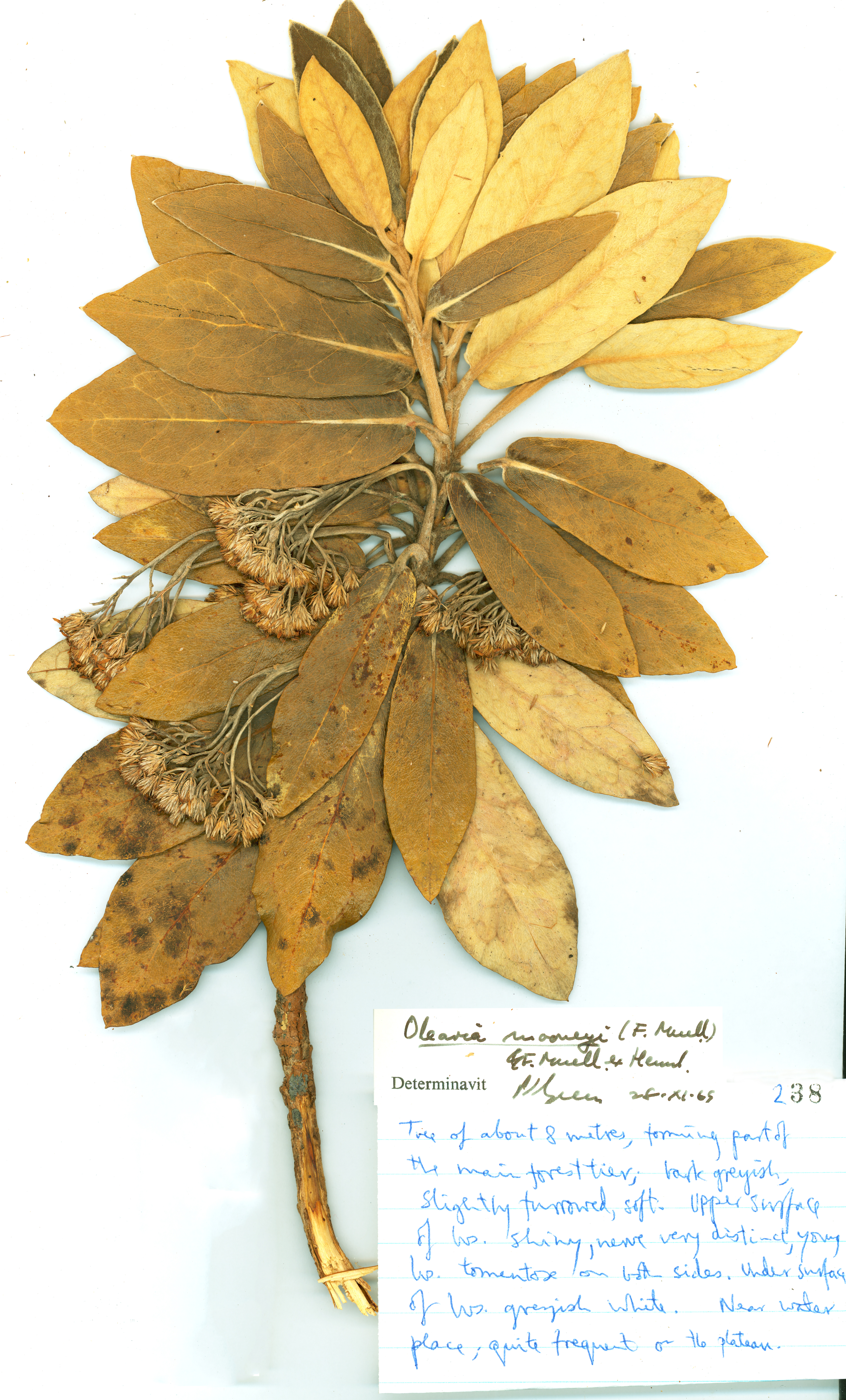
- Herbarium specimen

Scientific classification
- Kingdom: Plantae
- Clade: Tracheophytes
- Clade: Angiosperms
- Clade: Eudicots
- Clade: Asterids
- Order: Asterales
- Family: Asteraceae
- Genus: Olearia
- Species: O. mooneyi

Binomial name
- Olearia mooneyi (F.Muell.) Hemsl.

= Olearia mooneyi =

Species of shrub

Olearia mooneyi, commonly known as pumpkin bush, is a species of flowering plant in the family Asteraceae and is endemic to Lord Howe Island. It is a shrub or small tree with hairy, elliptic to egg-shaped leaves with the narrower end towards the base, and white and pale yellow, daisy-like inflorescences.

== Description ==
Olearia mooneyi is a densely-foliaged shrub that typically grows to a height of up to 2 m (6 ft 7 in) or a tree to 4 m (13 ft). Its leaves are arranged alternately, crowded, narrowly to broadly elliptic or egg-shaped with the narrower end towards the base, 40–100 mm (1.6–3.9 in) long and 15–35 mm (0.59–1.38 in) on a petiole 3–12 mm (0.12–0.47 in) long. The upper surface of the leaves is glabrous, green and shiny, the lower surface pale brown and covered with fine woolly hairs. The heads or daisy-like "flowers" are arranged in dense corymbs and are about 8 mm (0.31 in) in diameter, the involucre about 3 mm (0.12 in) long and softly-hairy. Each head has about twelve white ray florets, the ligules about 6 mm (0.24 in) long, surrounding about eight pale yellow disc florets. Flowering occurs from November to January and the fruit is a hairy brown achene, the pappus with about twenty bristles.

== Taxonomy ==
Pumpkin bush was first formally described in 1874 by Ferdinand von Mueller who gave it the name Aster mooneyi in Fragmenta Phytographiae Australiae from specimens collected by "Lind" and Fullagar on the summits of Mount Lidgbird and Mount Gower. In 1896, William Hemsley changed the name to Olearia mooneyi. The specific epithet honours Thomas Mooney (1842–1873), an early settler of Lord Howe Island who was interested in its plants. Mooney arrived on the island in 1867 but was lost at sea in 1873.

== Distribution and habitat ==
Olearia mooneyi is endemic to Lord Howe Island on mountains where it is the dominant tree above 750 m (2,460 ft).
