= Pseudocharopa =

Scientific classification
- Kingdom: Animalia
- Phylum: Mollusca
- Class: Gastropoda
- Order: Stylommatophora
- Superfamily: Punctoidea
- Family: Charopidae
- Subfamily: Charopinae
- Genus: Pseudocharopa; Peile, 1929

Synonyms
- Ballena Iredale, 1944; Deceptrena Iredale, 1944; Howeinsulea Peile, 1929; Lidgbirdia Iredale, 1944

Genus of land snails

Pseudocharopa is a genus of three species of pinwheel snails that are endemic to Australia's Lord Howe Island in the Tasman Sea.

== Species ==
- Pseudocharopa exquisita Peile, 1929 – exquisite pinwheel snail
- Pseudocharopa ledgbirdi (Brazier, 1889) – Mount Lidgbird pinwheel snail
- Pseudocharopa whiteleggei (Brazier, 1889) – Whitelegge's pinwheel snail

Species brought into synonymy

- Pseudocharopa editor Iredale, 1944: synonym of Pseudocharopa whiteleggei (Brazier, 1889) (junior synonym)
- Pseudocharopa gowerensis Iredale, 1944: synonym of Pseudocharopa ledgbirdi (Brazier, 1889) (junior synonym)
- Pseudocharopa imperator Iredale, 1944: synonym of Pseudocharopa ledgbirdi (Brazier, 1889) (junior synonym)

== Distribution and habitat ==
The snails in this genus are rare. They are known only from the summits and upper slopes of Mount Lidgbird and Mount Gower, in leaf litter or on exposed rocks.
