= Pseudocharopa ledgbirdi =

Conservation status
- Critically endangered (EPBC Act)

Scientific classification
- Kingdom: Animalia
- Phylum: Mollusca
- Class: Gastropoda
- Order: Stylommatophora
- Family: Charopidae
- Genus: Pseudocharopa
- Species: P. ledgbirdi

Binomial name
- Pseudocharopa ledgbirdi (Brazier, 1889)
- Location of Lord Howe Island

Synonyms
- Helix (Rhytida) ledgbirdi Brazier, 1889; Helix (Rhytida) ledgbirdi Brazier, 1889 (original combination); Pseudocharopa gowerensis Iredale, 1944; Pseudocharopa imperator Iredale, 1944; Pseudocharopa imperator monta Iredale, 1944

Species of land snail

Pseudocharopa ledgbirdi, also known as the Mount Lidgbird pinwheel snail or the Mount Lidgbird charopid snail, is a species of pinwheel snail that is endemic to Australia's Lord Howe Island in the Tasman Sea.

== Description ==
The ear-shaped shell of mature snails is 5.7–6.7 mm in height, with a diameter of 8.3–10.8 mm, with a moderately low spire, impressed sutures. It is dark brown with zigzag, cream-coloured flammulations (flame-like markings). The umbilicus is moderately wide. The ovate aperture is flattened on the upper edge.

== Habitat ==
The snail is only known from Mount Lidgbird and Mount Gower, in rainforest on vertical rock faces. It is most easily found after rain, and probably shelters in small crevices during dry weather. It is considered to be Critically Endangered.
