= Whitelegge =

Whitelegge can refer to:

- Sir Benjamin Arthur Whitelegge (1852–1933), British doctor, occupational health pioneer, and Lady Whitelegge (1859–1949)
- Hugh Whitelegge Thomas (1887–1960), British colonial commissioner and Cambridge cricketer
- Sir Thomas Shenton Whitelegge Thomas (1879–1962), British colonial administrator
- Thomas Whitelegge (1850–1927), English/Australian naturalist (Whitelegge's pinwheel snail)
- Rev. William Whitelegge (1818–1896), Rector of Syderstone, Norfolk
