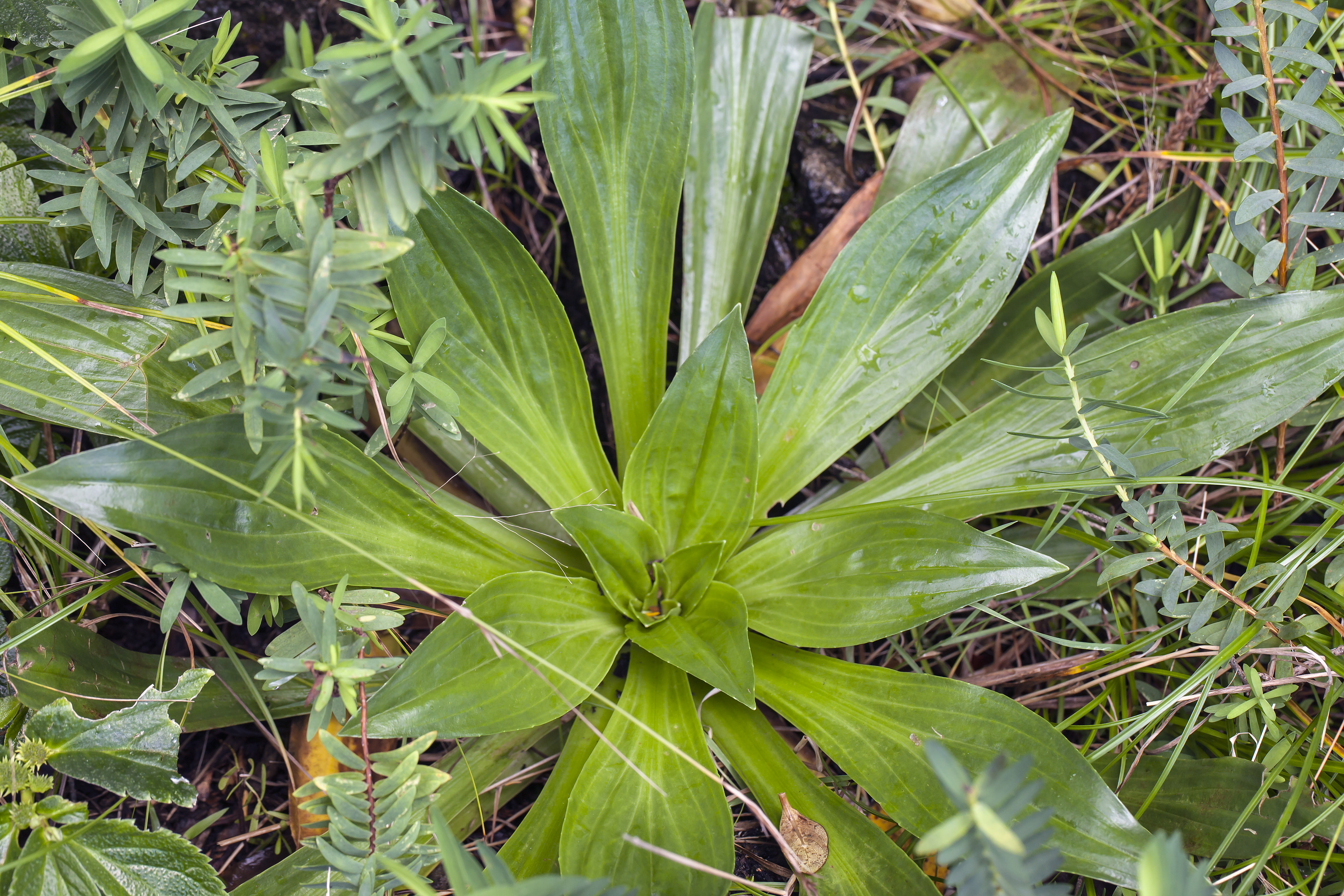

Scientific classification
- Kingdom: Plantae
- Clade: Tracheophytes
- Clade: Angiosperms
- Clade: Eudicots
- Clade: Asterids
- Order: Lamiales
- Family: Plantaginaceae
- Genus: Plantago
- Species: P. hedleyi

Binomial name
- Plantago hedleyi Maiden (1914)

= Plantago hedleyi =

Species of flowering plant in the plantain family

Plantago hedleyi is a species of flowering plant in the plant family Plantaginaceae that is endemic to Lord Howe Island, Australia. Joseph Maiden described P. hedleyi in 1914. Plants of this plantain are large with large leaves, up to nine veins, wide petioles, and long spikes with dozens of flowers and fruits with up to 5 seeds.

== Taxonomy and etymology ==
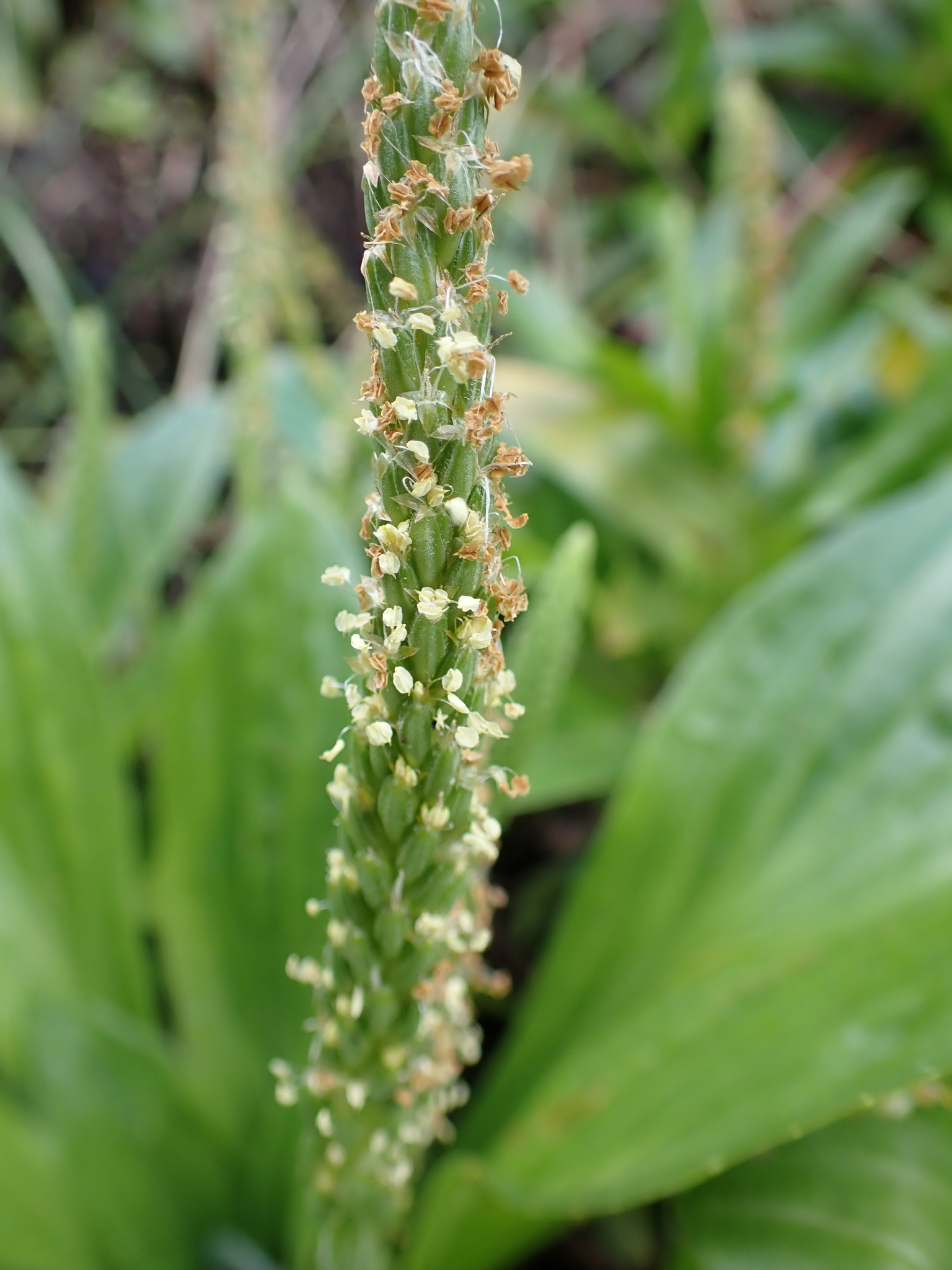
Flowering inflorescence of Plangato hedleyi

The specific epithet honours Australian naturalist and conchologist Charles Hedley, who helped collect the species in 1893.

== Description ==
It is a perennial herb. The narrowly oblanceolate-elliptic leaves are 7–20 cm (2.8–7.9 in) long and 1.5–4 cm (0.6–1.6 in) wide. The scape is 7–25 cm (2.8–9.8 in) tall. The inflorescence is cylindrical and 2–10 cm (0.8–3.9 in) long.

== Distribution and habitat ==
The species is endemic to Australia's subtropical Lord Howe Island in the Tasman Sea. It occurs in rocky sites on the upper slopes and summits of Mounts Lidgbird and Gower at the southern end of the island.

== Phylogeny ==
In molecular phylogenetic studies focusing on Plantago species throughout the world, Plantago hedleyi was also shown to be related to other species from New Zealand and Australia, including other island endemics such as Plantago aucklandica (which is endemic to Auckland Islands, New Zealand) and Plantago stauntonii (which is endemic to Île Amsterdam).

== Gallery ==
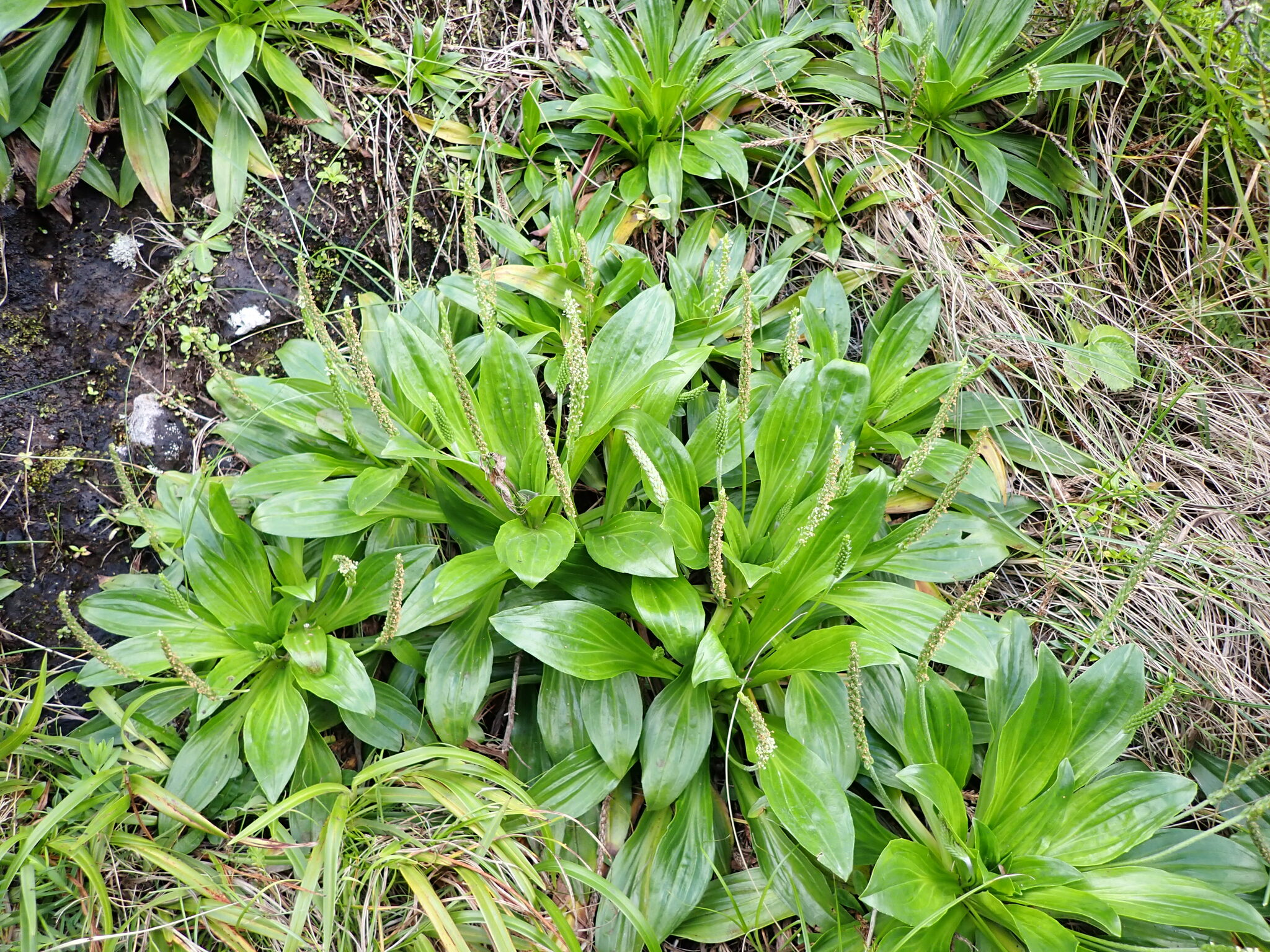

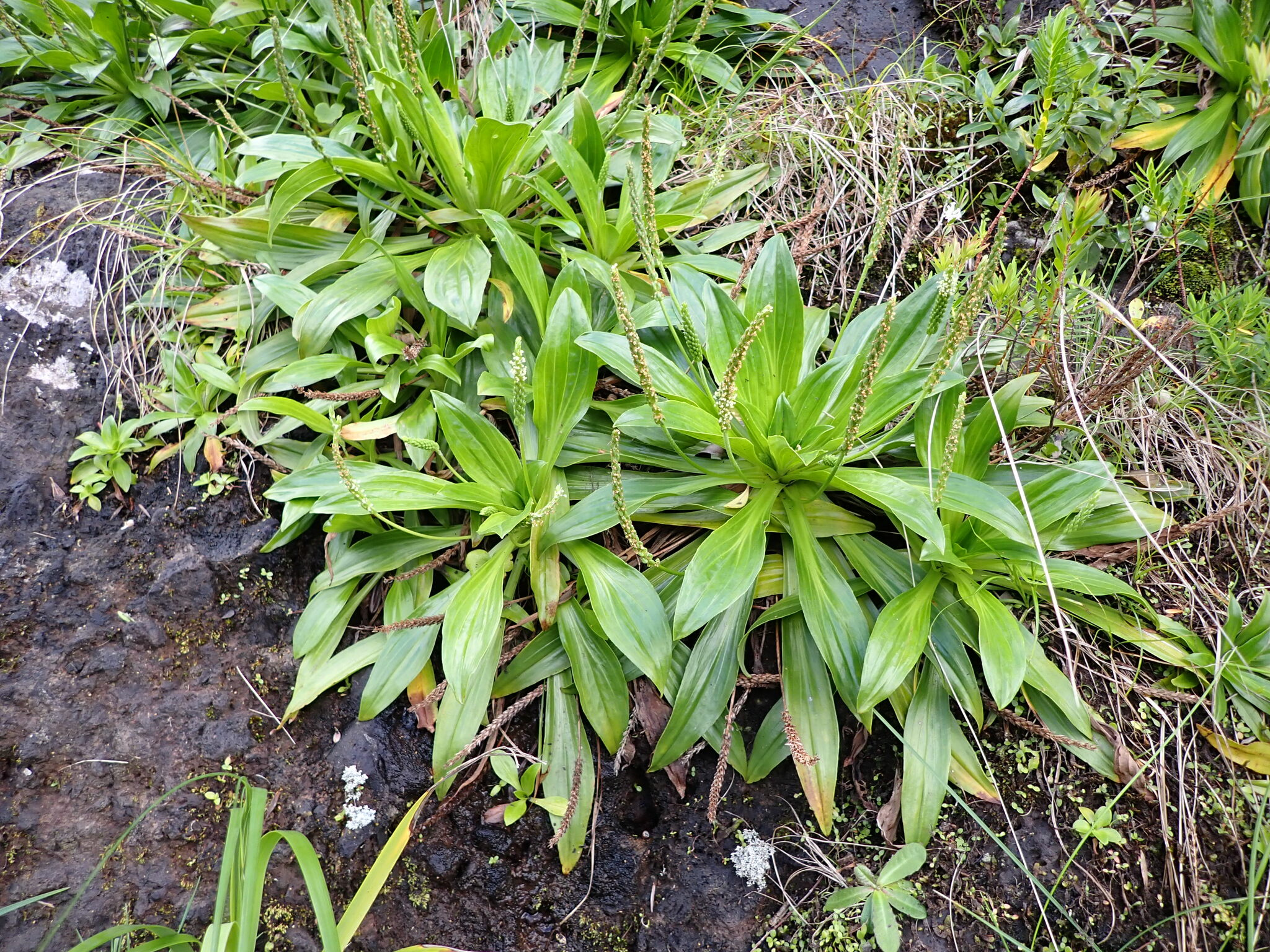
