= Pseudocharopa exquisita =

Scientific classification
- Kingdom: Animalia
- Phylum: Mollusca
- Class: Gastropoda
- Order: Stylommatophora
- Family: Charopidae
- Genus: Pseudocharopa
- Species: P. exquisita

Binomial name
- Pseudocharopa exquisita Peile, 1929
- Location of Lord Howe Island

Species of land snail

Pseudocharopa exquisita, also known as the exquisite pinwheel snail, is a species of pinwheel snail that is endemic to Australia's Lord Howe Island in the Tasman Sea.

== Description ==
The ear-shaped shell of mature snails is 5.5–7 mm in height, with a diameter of 8.8–9.6 mm, with a moderately low spire, impressed sutures and whorls rounded with a supraperipheral sulcus. It has orange-brown and cream flammulations (flame-like markings). The umbilicus is very narrow, covered by the reflected lip. The ovately lunate aperture is distorted by a groove.

== Habitat ==
The snail is only known from the summit of Mount Lidgbird, where it was found crawling on wet rock faces. It has not been seen since 1914, when it was collected in large numbers, and it may be extinct.
