= Pseudocharopa whiteleggei =

Conservation status
- Critically endangered (EPBC Act)

Scientific classification
- Kingdom: Animalia
- Phylum: Mollusca
- Class: Gastropoda
- Order: Stylommatophora
- Family: Charopidae
- Genus: Pseudocharopa
- Species: P. whiteleggei

Binomial name
- Pseudocharopa whiteleggei (Brazier, 1889)
- Location of Lord Howe Island

Synonyms
- Helix (Rhytida) whiteleggei Brazier, 1889; Pseudocharopa editor Iredale, 1944

Species of land snail

Pseudocharopa whiteleggei, also known as Whitelegge's pinwheel snail or Whitelegge's land snail, is a species of pinwheel snail that is endemic to Australia's Lord Howe Island in the Tasman Sea. It is the largest charopid species in Australia. It is named after naturalist Thomas Whitelegge.

== Description ==
The ear-shaped shell of mature snails is 7.1–8.3 mm in height, with a diameter of 15.6–17.7 mm, discoidal with a flat spire and impressed sutures. It is dark reddish-brown with indistinct zigzag, cream-coloured flammulations (flame-like markings). The umbilicus is moderately wide. The ovately lunate aperture is flattened on the upper edge. The animal has a lime-green sole and dark grey upper body, neck, head and eye-tentacles.

== Habitat ==
The snail is known mainly from the summits and upper slopes of Mount Lidgbird and Mount Gower, living in rainforest leaf litter.

== Conservation ==
The snail has been subject to predation by introduced rodents and is considered to be Critically Endangered.
