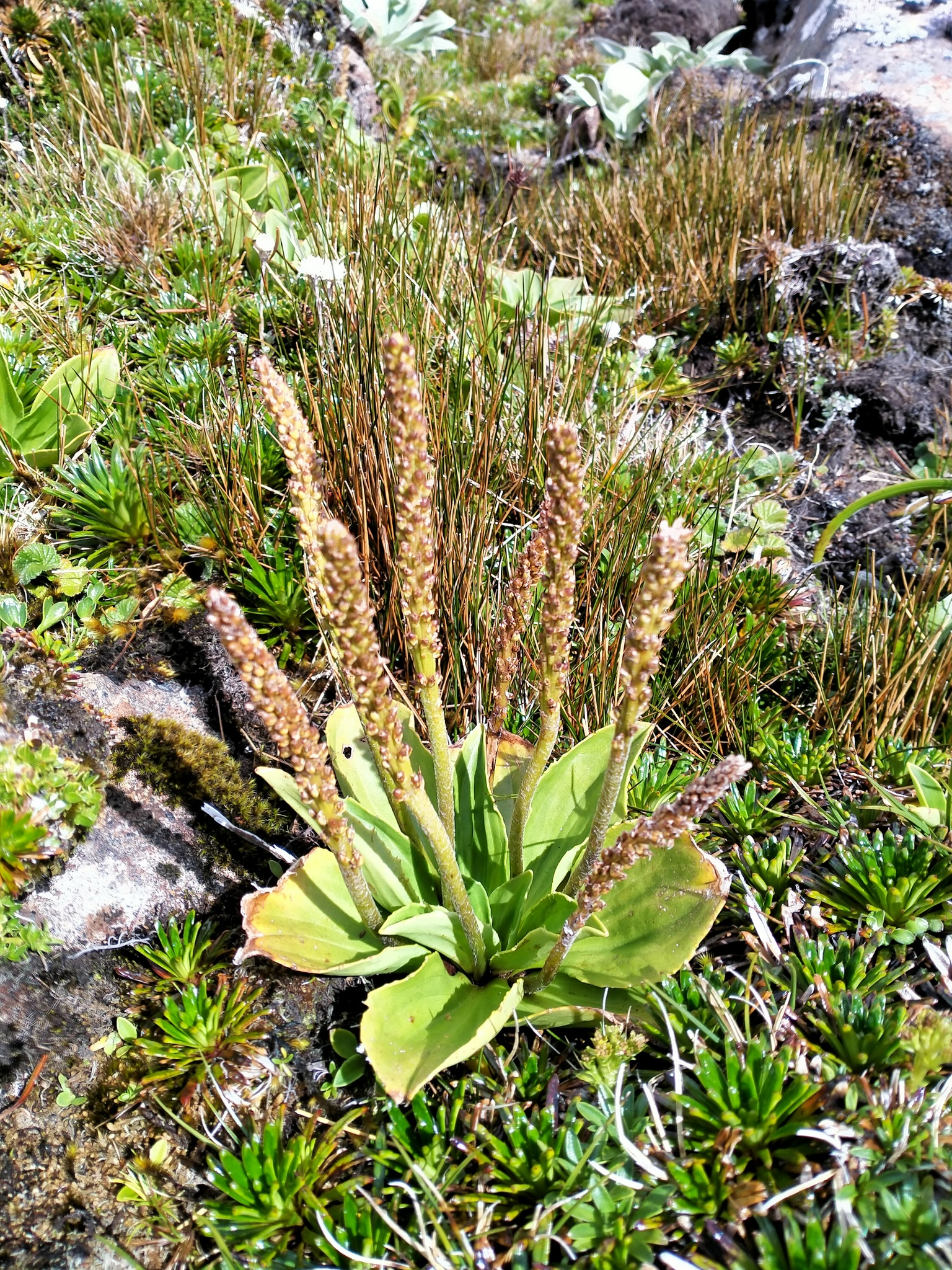
- Fruiting plant of Plantago aucklandica on Auckland Island

Conservation status
- Naturally Uncommon (NZ TCS)

Scientific classification
- Kingdom: Plantae
- Clade: Tracheophytes
- Clade: Angiosperms
- Clade: Eudicots
- Clade: Asterids
- Order: Lamiales
- Family: Plantaginaceae
- Genus: Plantago
- Species: P. aucklandica

Binomial name
- Plantago aucklandica Hook.f.

= Plantago aucklandica =

Species of flowering plant in the plantain family

Plantago aucklandica is a species of flowering plant in the family Plantaginaceae that is endemic to the subantarctic Auckland Islands, New Zealand. Joseph Dalton Hooker described P. aucklandica in his Flora Antarctica in 1844. Plants of this plantain are large with large leaves, up to seven veins, wide petioles, colliculate seeds, and long spikes with dozens of flowers and one-seeded fruits. This species in considered to be "At Risk — Naturally Uncommon", as it is an island endemic with a restricted range.

== Taxonomy and etymology ==
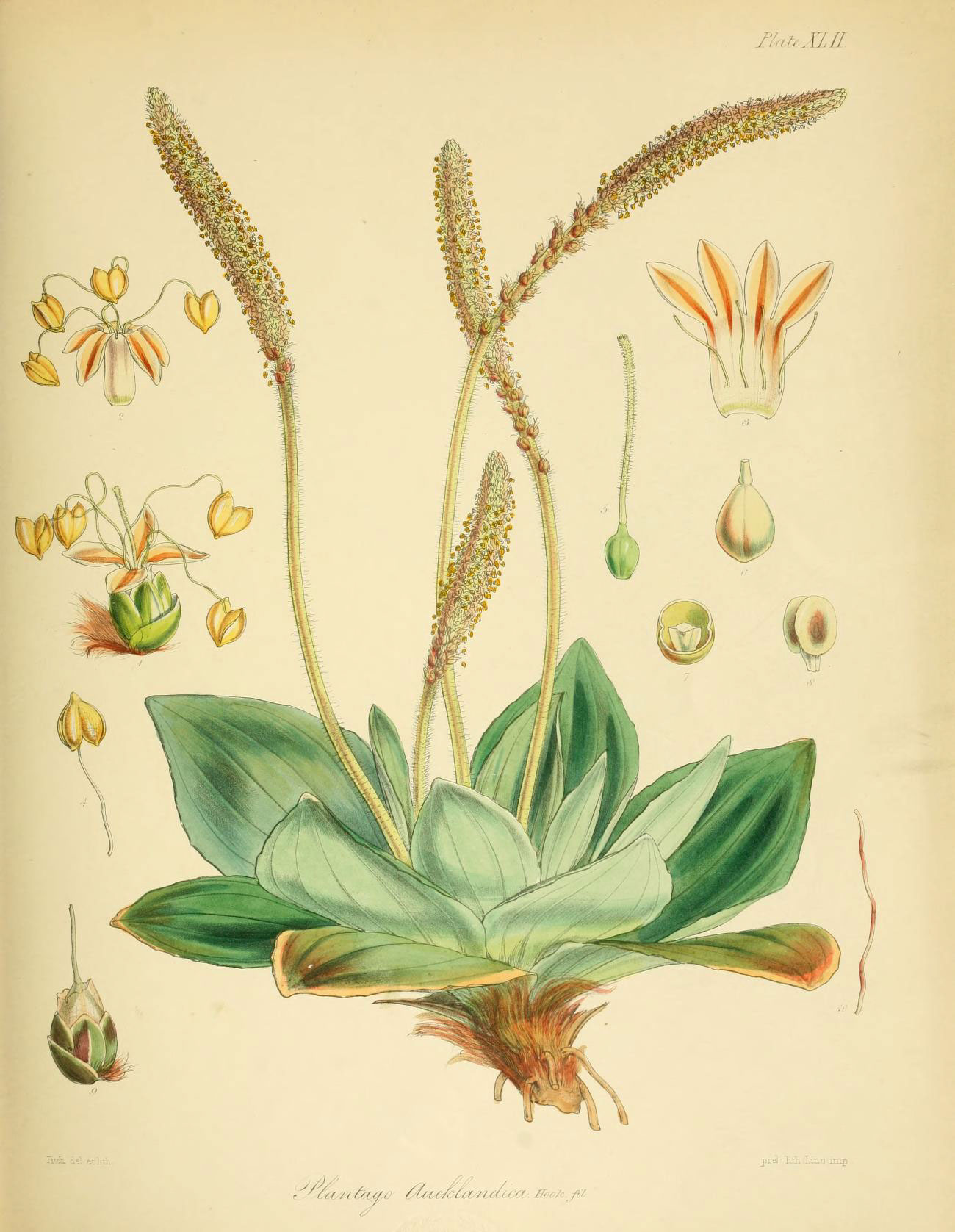
Plate XLII in Flora Antarctica

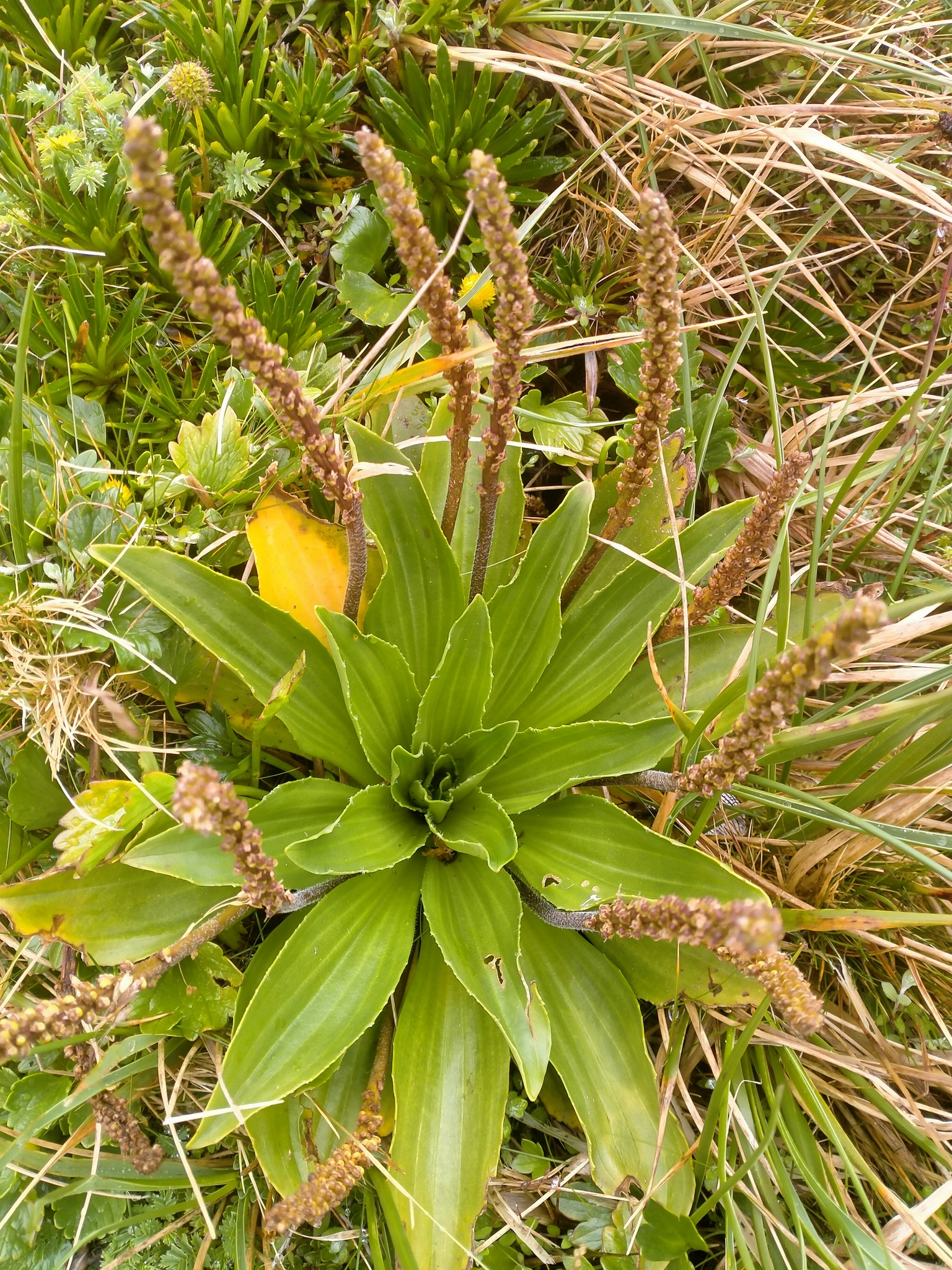

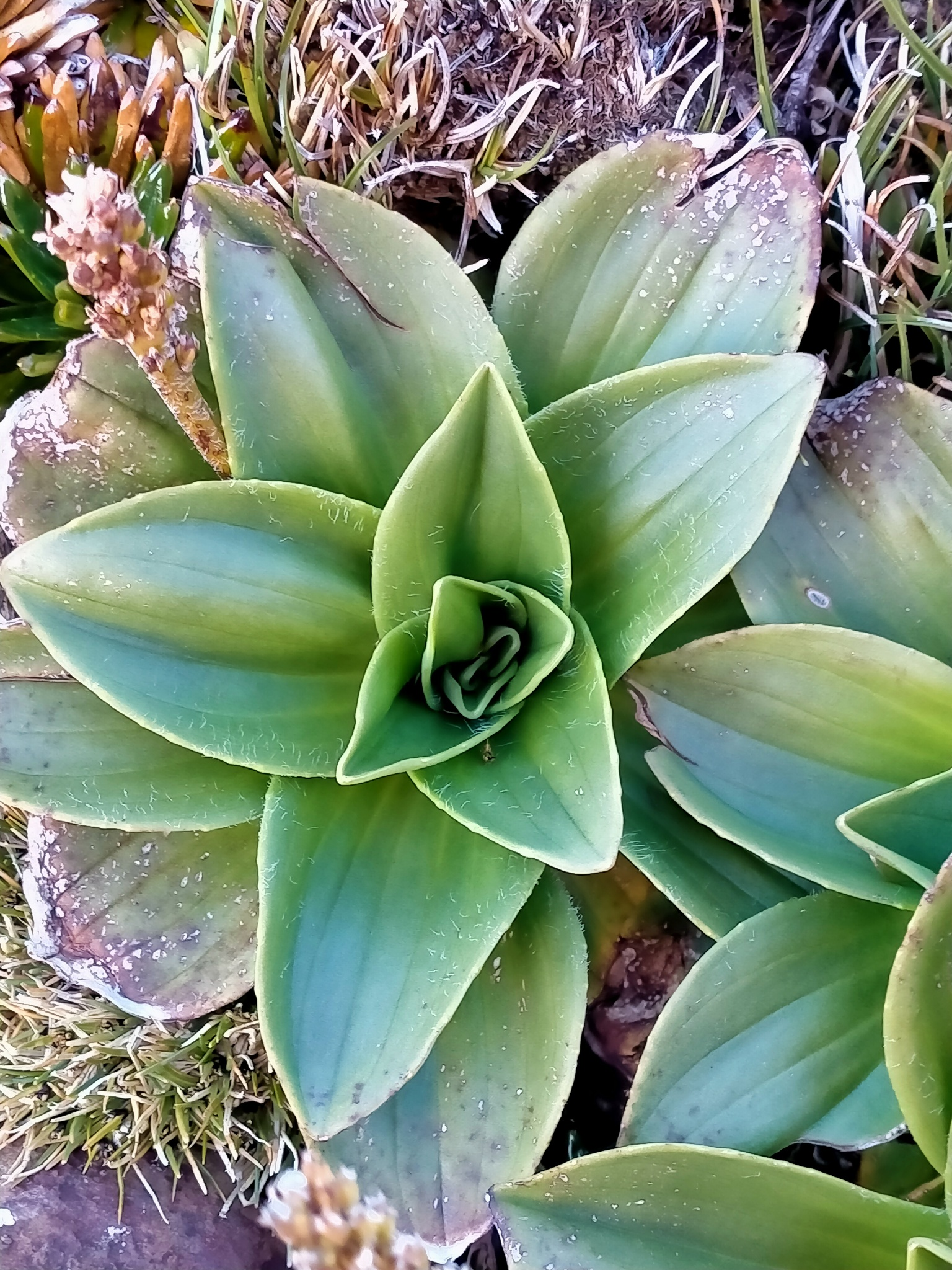
P. aucklandica rosette leaves

Plantago aucklandica is in the plant family Plantaginaceae. It was first described by Joseph Dalton Hooker in 1844, from specimens he had collected in the Auckland Islands "on the mountain ridges at an altitude of 1000–1200 feet, in a peaty soil" while serving on the Ross expedition in the Antarctic. The specific epithet, aucklandica, is used to mean "of the Auckland Islands".

The lectotype specimen was designated by Heidi Meudt, was collected by Joseph Hooker in November 1840 "in marshy places at top of the hill at back of Rendezvous Harbour, Lord Auckland Island," and is lodged at the Kew Herbarium (lectotype K000438784 and isolectotye K000438785 are on the same sheet).

At the time of its description, Hooker likened P. aucklandica to other island species rather than other New Zealand species. The similarities between different oceanic island species of Plantago may be caused by similar environmental stresses rather than shared ancestry.

Plantago aucklandica differs from all other species of Plantago that are indigenous to New Zealand by its large leaves with up to seven veins, axillary hairs, wide petioles, and long spikes with up to 132 flowers. It has only two ovules (one of which aborts) in each ovary, and its seeds have low rounded protuberances on the ventral surface (colliculate), whereas all other New Zealand native species have seeds with a networked ventral surface (reticulate).

== Description ==
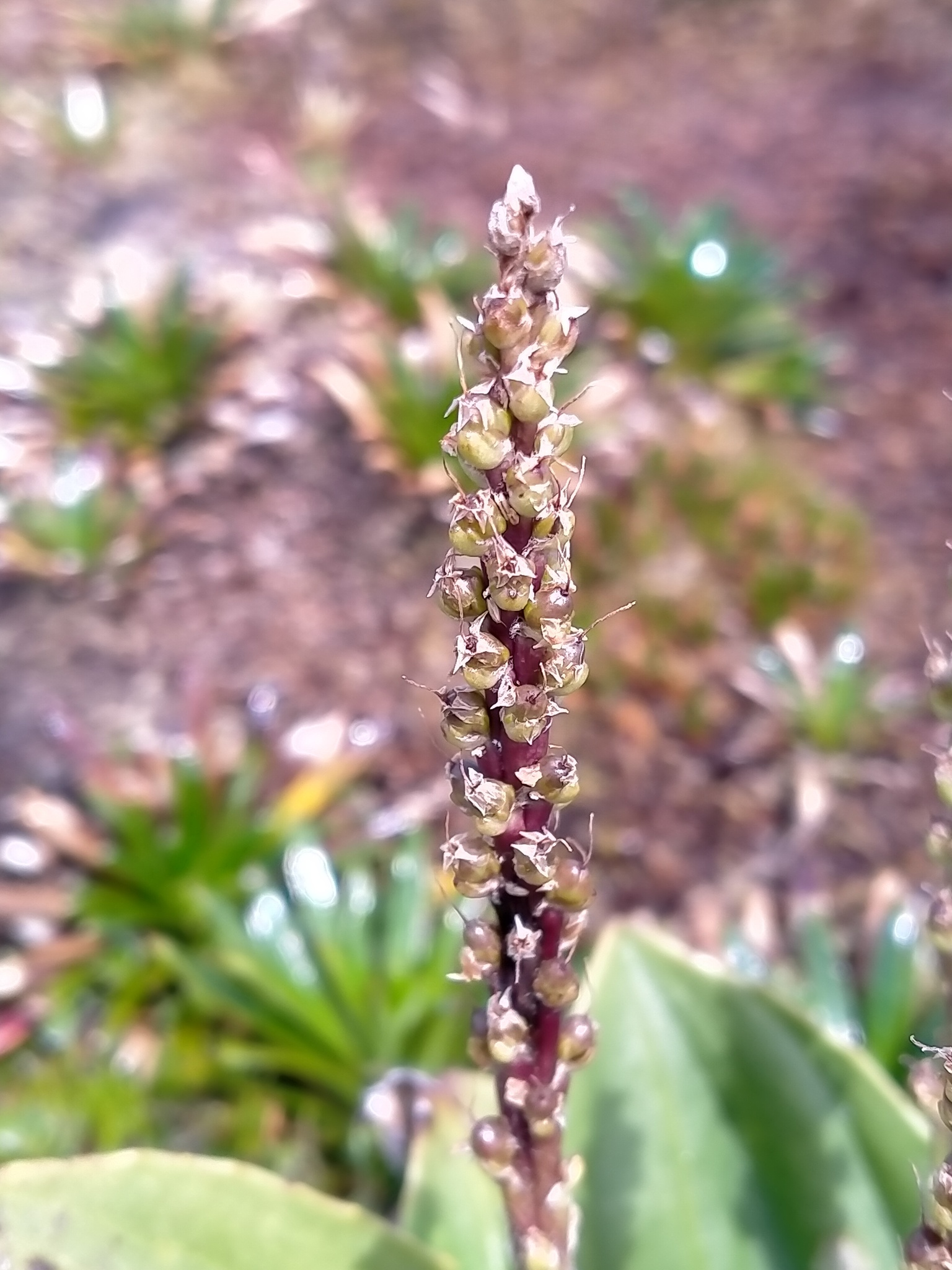
Scape with many fruits (one-seeded capsules) of Plantago aucklandica

Plantago aucklandica plants are rosettes with a primary root up to 2.5 cm thick, with up to 13 narrowly angular-ovate or narrowly obovate leaves, and with long (up to 4 cm long), rust-coloured, obvious leaf axillary hairs in the basal rosette. The leaves are usually 5–7 veined, 5–12 cm long (including petiole) and up to 5 cm wide, usually punctate, usually glabrous on both surfaces, or sometimes with isolated hairs. The leaf has an acute or obtuse apex, and its edges are smooth or with up to 24 minute teeth. The petiole is sometimes distinguishable from the leaf lamina, and up to 5.5 cm long. Each rosette plant has 1–6 erect inflorescences which can be up to 34 cm long. The scapes are smooth, not ribbed, and hairy with patent hairs. The spikes are long and linear-ovoid, with 44–132 flowers that are densely crowded above but more distant (up to 1.2 cm apart) below. Each flower has a bract that is ovate to very broadly ovate and glabrous (or sometimes with a few hairs at the apex). The calyx is glabrous, 1.8–2.6 mm long, 1.3–2.3 mm wide. The corolla tube is 1.5–2.5 mm long, corolla lobes 1.1–1.7 mm long, stamen filaments 2.3–4.4 mm long, anthers 1.0–1.5 mm long, and style 2.3–4.2 mm long and densely hairy. The ovary is 0.8–1.4 mm long, with 2 ovules. The fruit is a dry, dehiscent capsule with circumsessile dehiscence, usually ellipsoid, rhomboid or angular-obovoid, widest at or above middle, 2–3 mm long and 1.3–2.3 mm wide. Each capsule has 1 or sometimes 2 uniform brown seeds 1.3-2 mm long with rounded edges.

Plantago aucklandica has flowers and fruits from November to February.

The chromosome number of Plantago aucklandica is unknown.

== Distribution and habitat ==
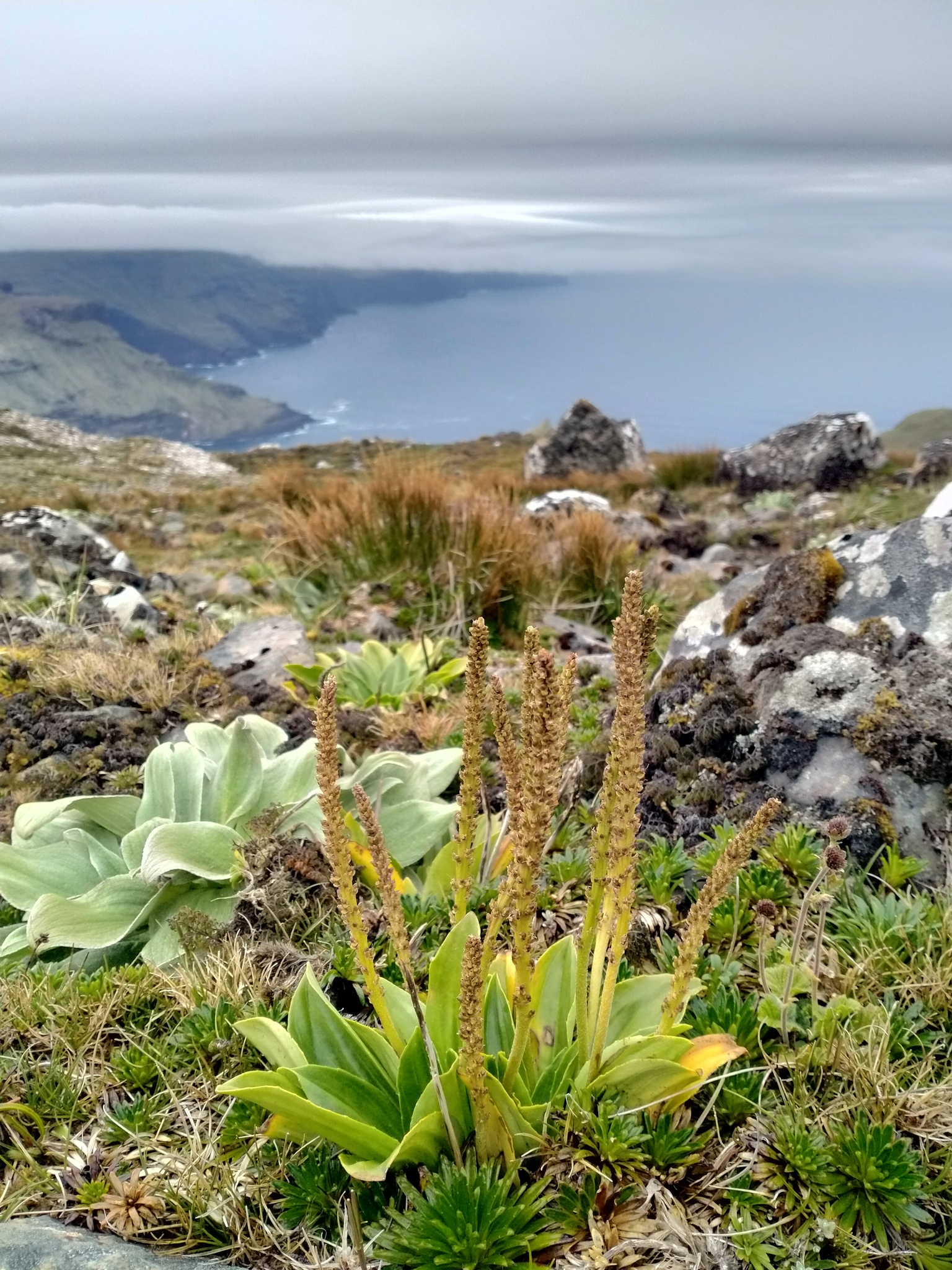
Plantago aucklandica on Auckland Island in rocky, high-elevation fellfield habitat

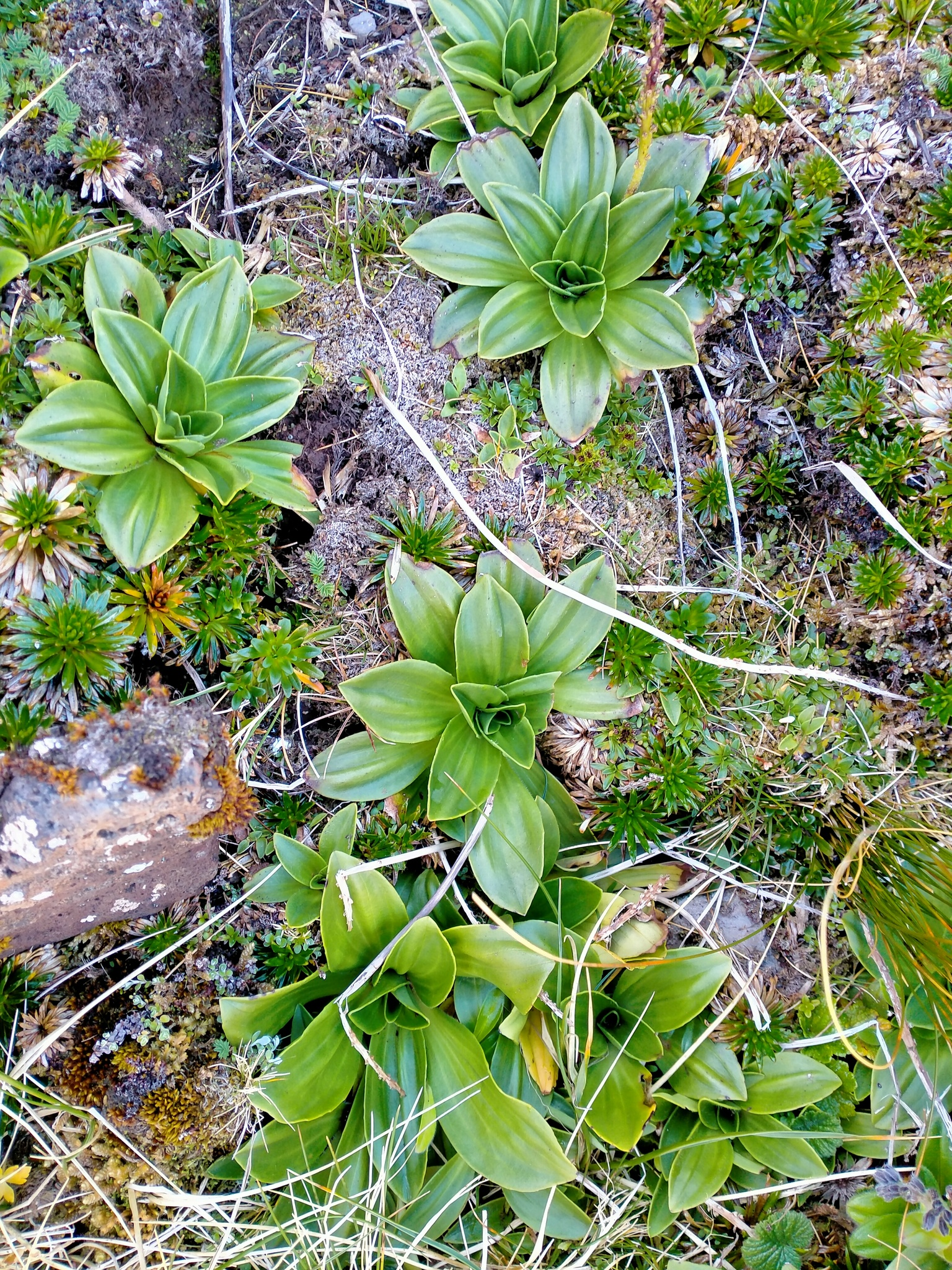
Multiple rosettes of P. aucklandica in high-elevation fellfield habitat on Auckland Island

Plantago aucklandica is a plantain that is endemic to the Auckland Islands, New Zealand. It is found only at the higher elevations of the Auckland Islands, specifically on Auckland Island and Adams Island, where it grows in fellfield, marshy places, on bare wind-blown areas and in rocky places of 360–550 m (1,180–1,800 ft) elevation. It also occurs on ridge tops of Disappointment Island with Acaena minor var. antarctica, Gentianella concinna, and Bulbinella rossii.

== Phylogeny ==
Plantago aucklandica was included in phylogenetic analyses of Australasian species of Plantago using standard DNA sequencing markers (nuclear ribosomal DNA, chloroplast DNA, and mitochondrial DNA regions) and amplified fragment length polymorphisms (AFLPs). In those studies, Plantago aucklandica was strongly supported as being closely related to the mainland New Zealand species P. obconica, P. novae-zelandiae and P. lanigera.

In other phylogenetic studies focusing on Plantago species throughout the world, Plantago aucklandica was also shown to be related to Plantago hedleyi (which is endemic to Lord Howe Island, Australia) and Plantago stauntonii (which is endemic to Île Amsterdam).

== Conservation status ==
In 2009 and 2012, it was classified as "At Risk - Naturally Uncommon" under the New Zealand Threat Classification System, and again in 2018, it was given the same classification, with the qualifiers IE (island endemic) and RR (restricted range).
