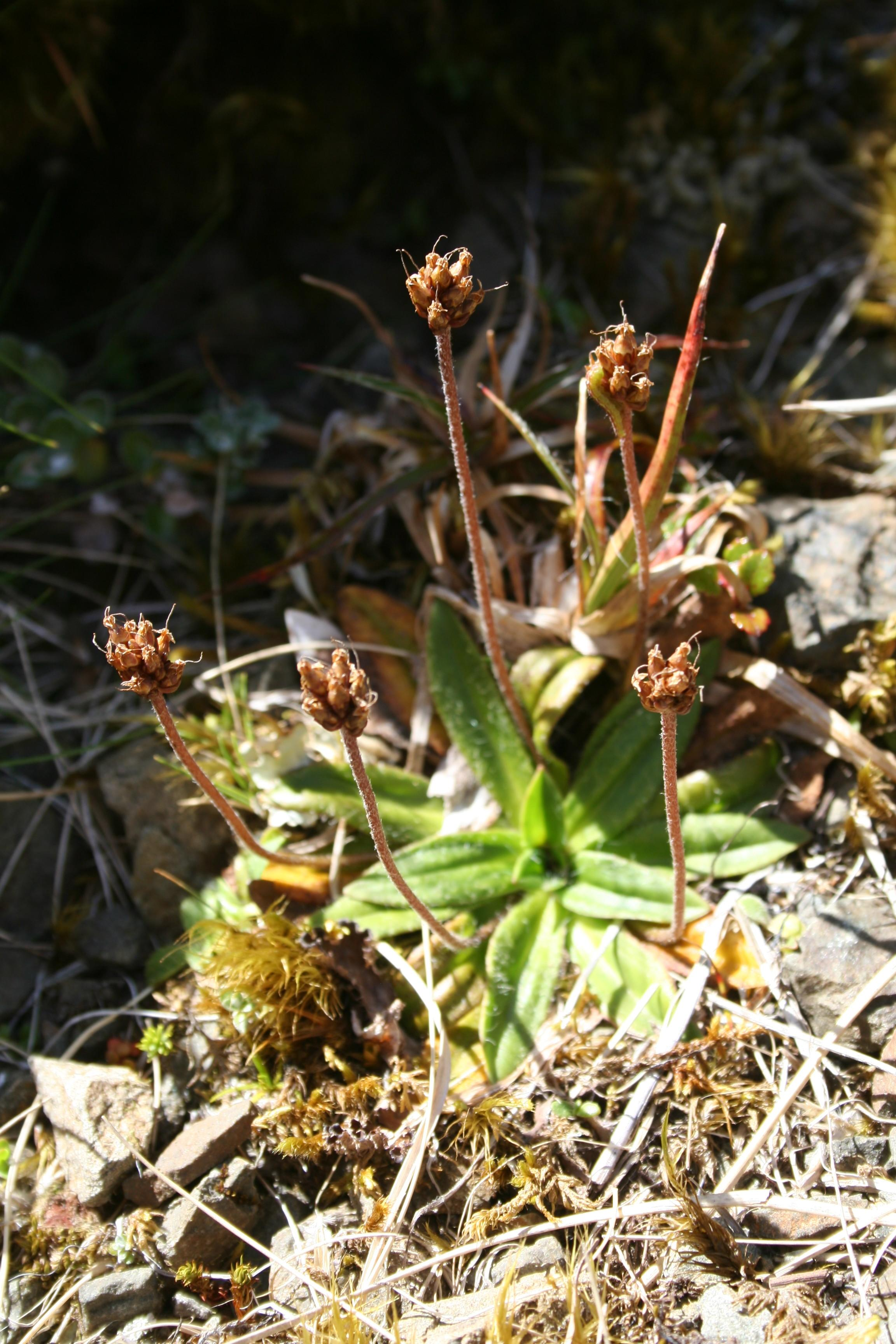
- Fruiting plant of P. novae-zelandiae from Mt Hikurangi, East Cape, New Zealand, observed in 2020

Conservation status
- Not Threatened (NZ TCS)

Scientific classification
- Kingdom: Plantae
- Clade: Tracheophytes
- Clade: Angiosperms
- Clade: Eudicots
- Clade: Asterids
- Order: Lamiales
- Family: Plantaginaceae
- Genus: Plantago
- Species: P. novae-zelandiae

Binomial name
- Plantago novae-zelandiae L.B.Moore

= Plantago novae-zelandiae =

Species of flowering plant in the plantain family

Plantago novae-zelandiae is a species of flowering plant in the family Plantaginaceae that is endemic to New Zealand. Lucy Moore described P. novae-zelandiae in 1961. Plants of this species of plantain are perennial with a rosette habit, leaves widest above the middle, up to 4 ellipsoid seeds per capsule, glabrous bracts and sepals, and punctate leaves. It is listed as Not Threatened.

== Taxonomy ==
Plantago novae-zelandiae is in the plant family Plantaginaceae. Lucy Moore described P. novae-zelandiae in the Flora of New Zealand in 1961.

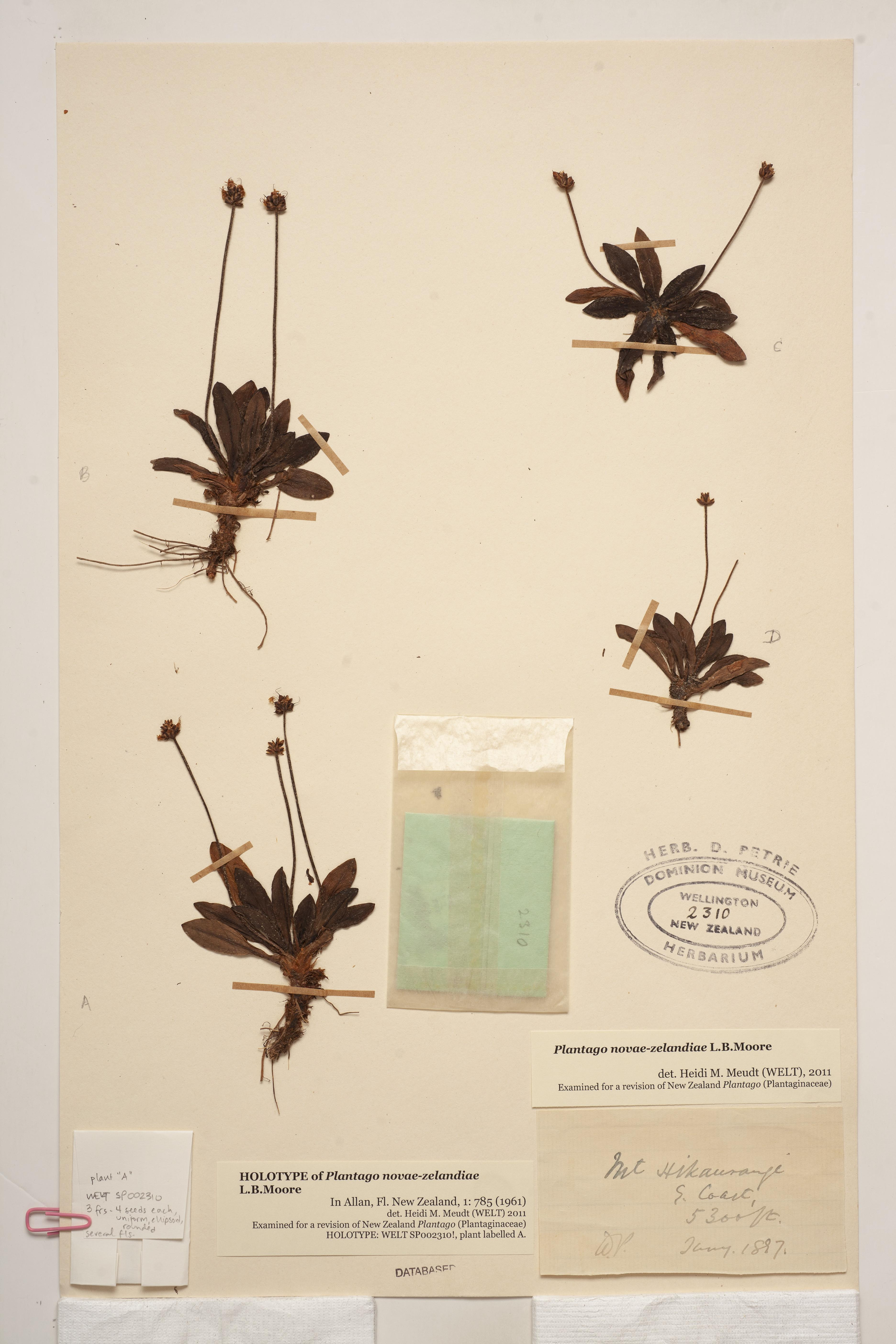
Holotype specimen of P. novae-zelandiae at the Te Papa herbarium

The holotype was collected by Donald Petrie in 1897 on Hikurangi, North Island, New Zealand and is housed at the herbarium of the Museum of New Zealand Te Papa Tongarewa (WELT).

Plantago novae-zelandiae is morphologically most similar to P. lanigera and P. unibracteata.

Compared to P. unibracteata and P. triandra, P. novae-zelandiae and P. lanigera (and other mainland New Zealand species) have leaves that are widest at or above the middle, and usually longer scapes, more flowers per spike, and fewer seeds per capsule.

Plantago novae-zelandiae can be distinguished from P. lanigera by ovule and seed characters, especially fewer ovules (4 vs. 8–13), fewer seeds (1–4 vs. 4–13) that are larger (1.3–2.1 mm long vs. 0.6–1.5) as well as rounded and ellipsoid (vs. angular or rounded and of various shapes).

== Description ==
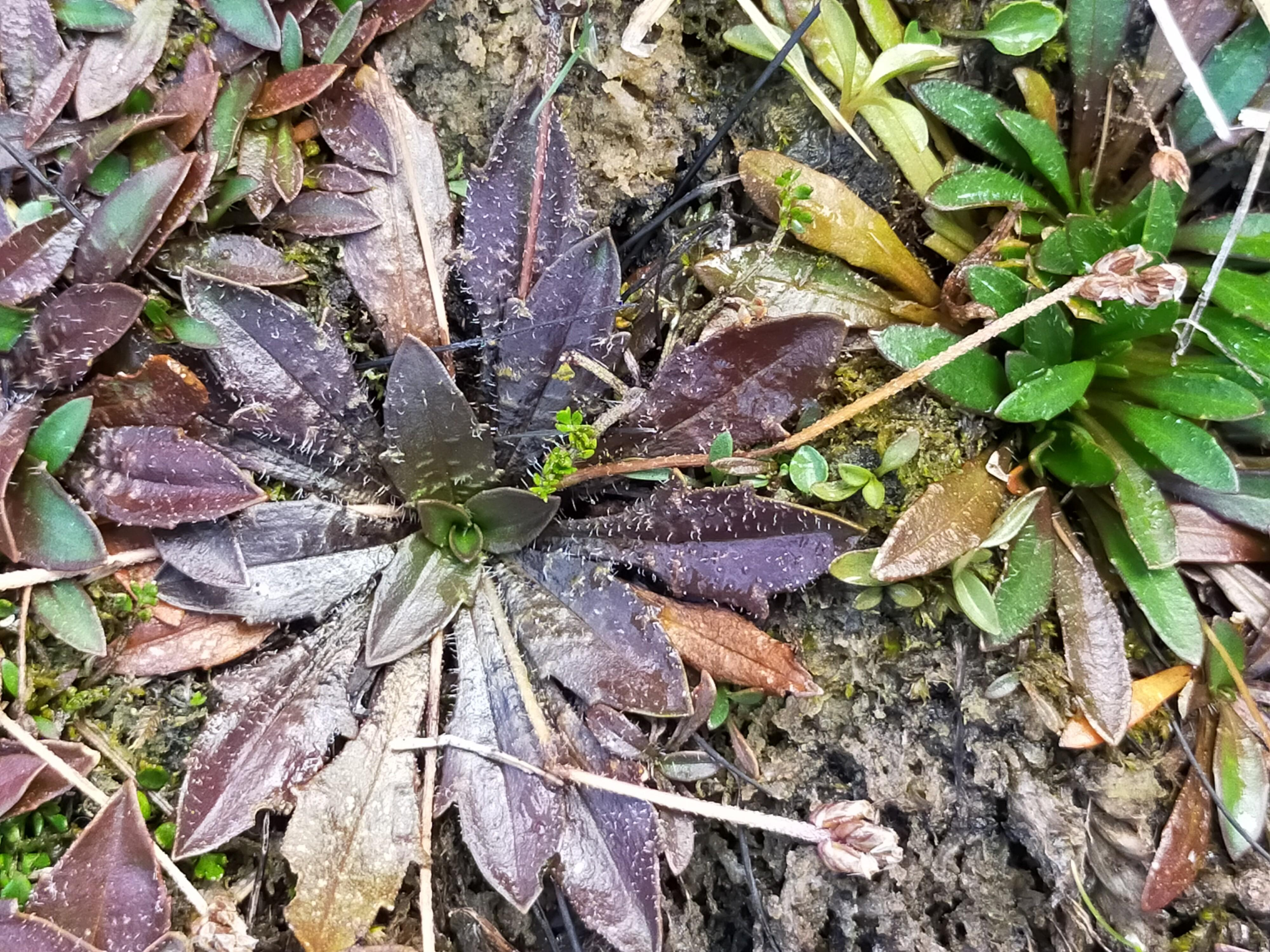
Rosettes of P. novae-zelandiae observed in Fiordland National Park, South Island, New Zealand, in 2020

Plantago novae-zelandiae plants are small rosettes with a primary root up to 15 mm thick, with up to 40 usually narrowly angular-ovate or angular-ovate leaves, and with visible, short (<10 mm long), rust-coloured leaf axillary hairs in the basal rosette. The leaves have 1–3 veins, are 23–88 mm long (including petiole) and up to 19 mm wide, usually punctate, with isolated hairs or sparsely hairy on the upper surface, usually glabrous or with isolated hairs on the lower surface. The leaf usually has an acute apex, and its edges are smooth or wavy or with up to 6 minute teeth. The petiole is sometimes distinguishable from the leaf lamina, and up to 30 mm long. Each rosette plant has up to 14 erect inflorescences which can be up to 115 mm long. The scapes are smooth and with isolated hairs to densely hairy. The spikes are usually globose or ovoid with 2–20 densely crowded flowers. Each flower has 1 small bract that is broadly ovate to very broadly ovate and usually glabrous. The calyx is 2.3–3.2 mm long, 1.6–2.7 mm wide, glabrous. The corolla tube is 1.8–3.0 mm long, corolla lobes 1.3–2.2 mm long, stamen filaments 3.2–5.8 mm long, anthers 1.3–1.4 mm long, and style 3.0–6.0 mm long and densely hairy. The ovary is 0.9–1.9 mm long, with 4 ovules. The fruit is a dry, dehiscent capsule with circumsessile dehiscence, usually broadly ellipsoid or globose, widest at or below middle, 1.6–3.6 mm long and 1.3–2.9 mm wide. Each capsule has 1–4 uniform rust or brown seeds 1.3–2.1 mm long, ellipsoid.

Plantago novae-zelandiae flowers from November to January and fruits from December to April.

The chromosome number of Plantago novae-zelandiae is 2n=24 (CHR 200533 only).

== Distribution and habitat ==
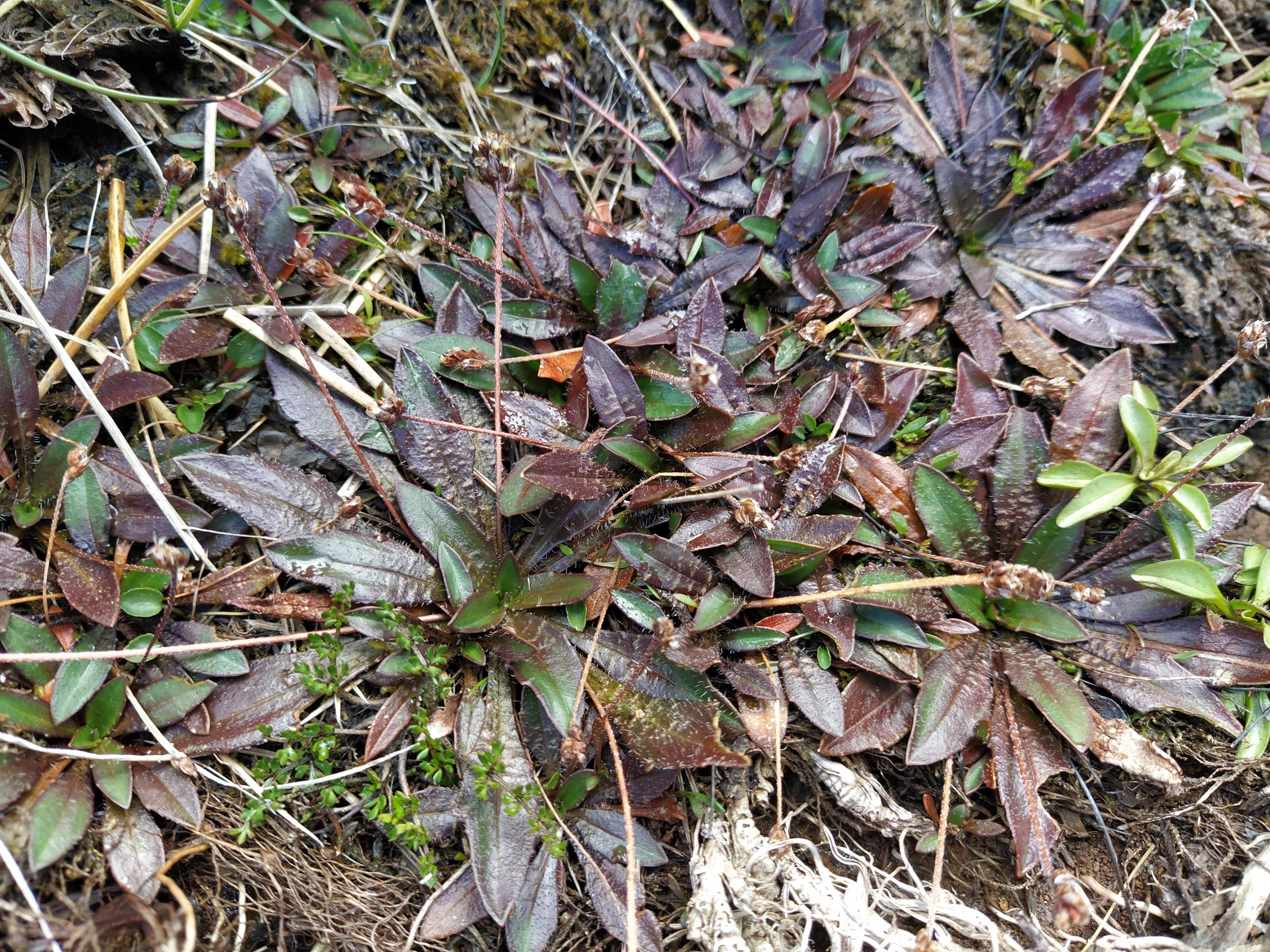
Plantago novae-zelandiae rosettes

Plantago novae-zelandiae is a plantain that is endemic to the North and South Islands of New Zealand.

In the North Island it is found in Volcanic Plateau, Gisborne regions and Southern North Island regions, whereas on the South Island it is found in Sounds Nelson, Western Nelson, Westland, Canterbury, Otago, and Fiordland regions.

It grows in subalpine to alpine herbfields, grasslands and scrub, in bogs, tarns, flushes, on rocks or outcrops, in damp to very wet areas, from 900 to 1,700 m (3,000 to 5,600 ft) above sea level.

== Phylogeny ==
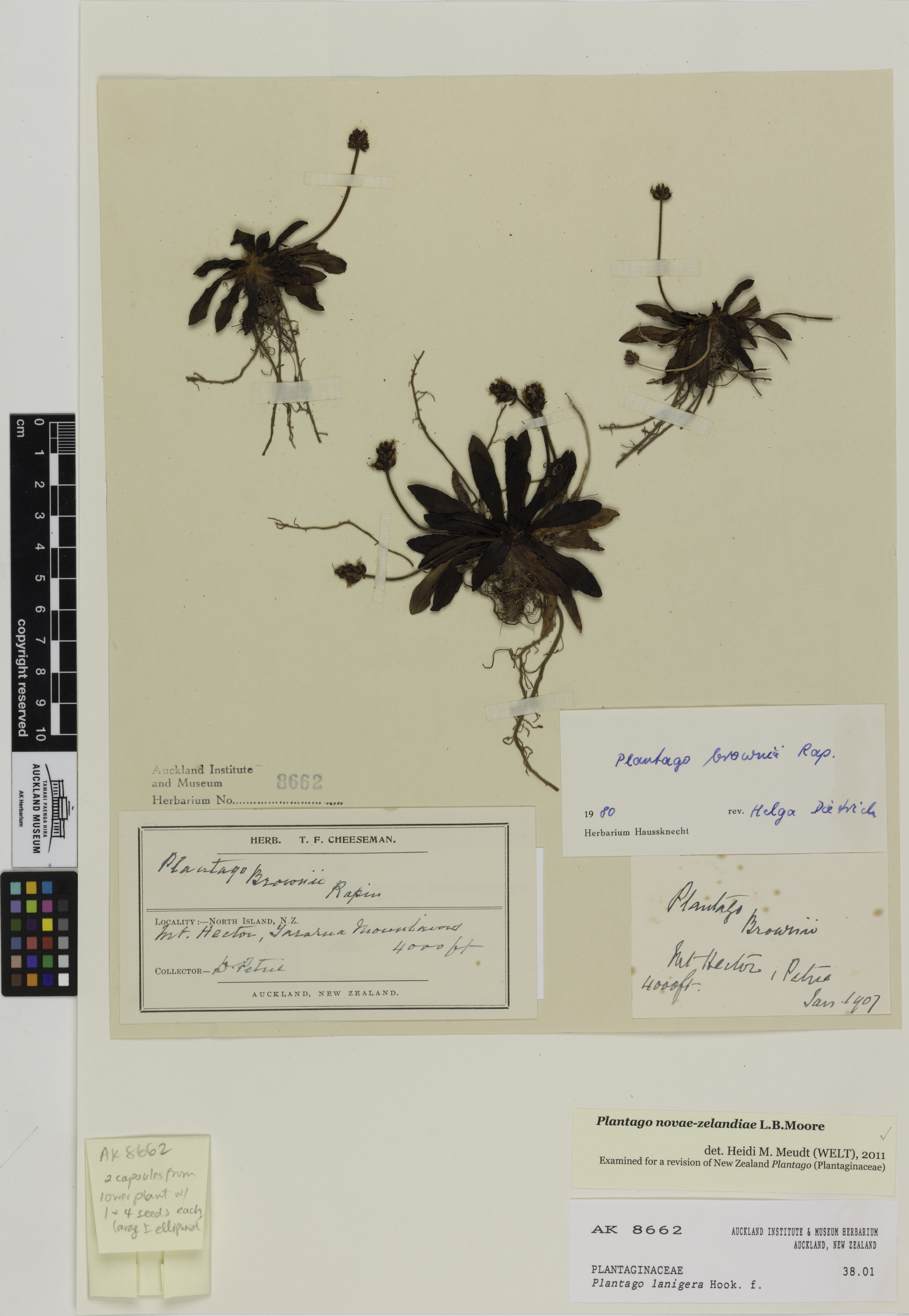
Herbarium specimen of P. novae-zelandiae collected by Donald Petrie in 1907 in the Tararua Range, North Island, New Zealand from the Auckland Museum herbarium

In phylogenetic analyses of Australasian species of Plantago using standard DNA sequencing markers (nuclear ribosomal DNA, chloroplast DNA, and mitochondrial DNA regions) and amplified fragment length polymorphisms (AFLPs), Plantago novae-zelandiae was strongly supported as being closely related to the mainland New Zealand species P. obconica and P. lanigera as well as the subantarctic species P. aucklandica.

Similarly, the sole individual of P. novae-zelandiae was closely related to individuals of P. lanigera and P. aucklandica in another phylogenetic study focusing on Plantago species throughout the world using whole chloroplast genomes. Finally, the species was not included in another phylogenetic studies focusing on oceanic island Plantago species using standard DNA sequencing markers.

== Conservation status ==
Plantago novae-zelandiae is listed as Not Threatened in the most recent assessment (2017–2018) of the New Zealand Threatened Classification for plants.
