= Erskine Valley =

Valley on Lord Howe Island, Australia

Coordinates: 31°34′40″S 159°04′20″E

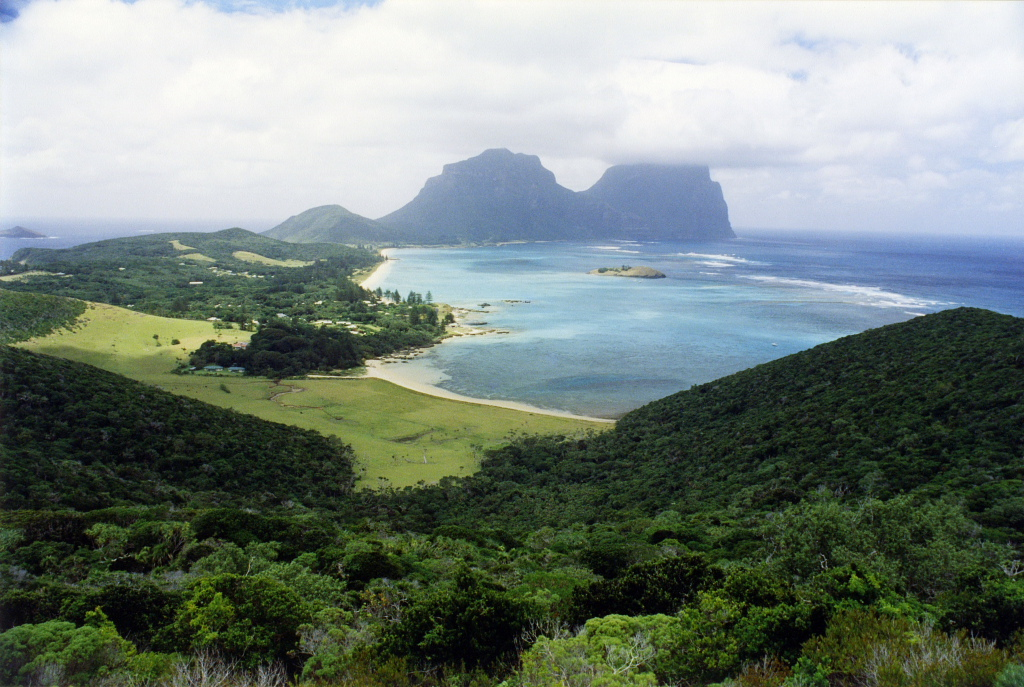
View from the northern end of Lord Howe Island towards the southern mountains of Lidgbird (left) and Gower (right), separated by Erskine Valley

Erskine Valley is a small, steep-sided, forested valley, containing the perennial Erskine Creek with several small waterfalls. About one kilometre long and broad, it lies between Mounts Lidgbird (to the north) and Gower (to the south), on the western side of the southern end of Australia’s subtropical Lord Howe Island in the Tasman Sea. The valley is traversed by the popular hiking track to the summit of Mount Gower. It was named after Thomas Erskine, Lord Chancellor of the United Kingdom from 1806 to 1807.

A description of the valley by Robert Etheridge in 1889 reads:

Mounts Ledgbird [sic] and Gower are separated by Erskine Valley, or the "Between Hills", a deep and wide depression, running down to the south- west coast. Its descent is very rapid and steep, with more or less permanent water, the sides of the valley being everywhere covered with boulders and volcanic débris, interspersed amongst the densest possible vegetation. The saddle at the head of this declivity, forming the connecting neck between the two hills, is very narrow, probably not more than twenty to thirty yards, covered with large boulders, and supporting a low, stunted vegetation and much under-growth, bearing testimony in the twisted and gnarled condition of the trees to the heavy squalls amid gales which pass across it, and of which we had a vivid personal experience during the night we were camped in this otherwise charming spot. Erskine Valley acts, in fact, as a kind of funnel, and reminded me much of the deep, long gulches with which the Island of St. Helena is cut up. The saddle cannot be far short of 2,000 feet above sea-level.
