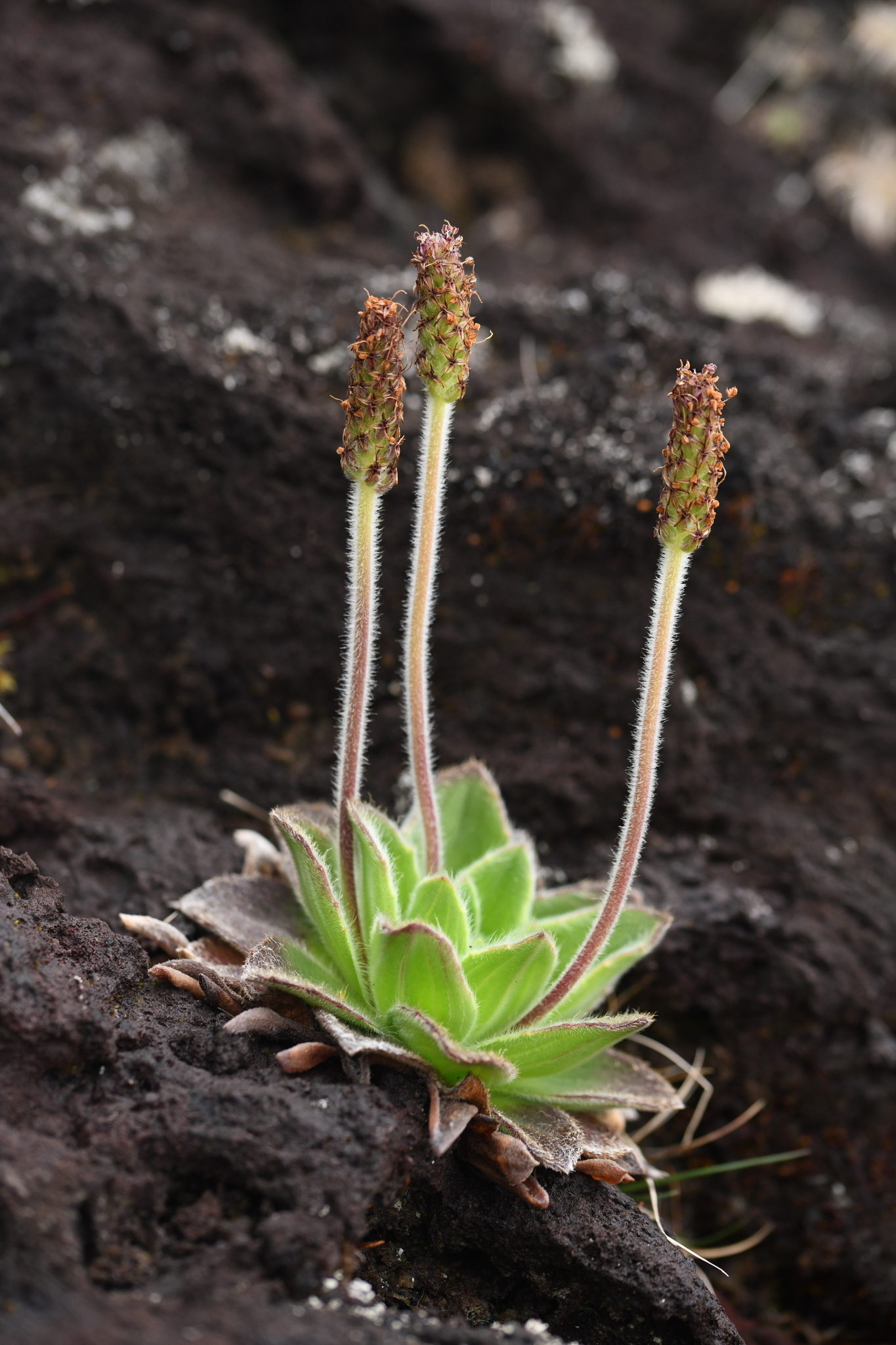
- Habit of Plantago stauntonii, photographed on Île Amsterdam

Scientific classification
- Kingdom: Plantae
- Clade: Tracheophytes
- Clade: Angiosperms
- Clade: Eudicots
- Clade: Asterids
- Order: Lamiales
- Family: Plantaginaceae
- Genus: Plantago
- Species: P. stauntonii

Binomial name
- Plantago stauntonii Staunton (1871)

= Plantago stauntonii =

Species of flowering plant in the plantain family

Plantago stauntonii is a species of flowering plant in the family Plantaginaceae that is endemic to Île Amsterdam and Île Saint-Paul in the French southern territories. Sir Heinrich Wilhelm Reichardt described P. stauntonii in 1871, naming it after Sir George Leonard Staunton, who collected specimens of it in 1793.

== Taxonomy and etymology ==
Plantago stauntonii is in the plant family Plantaginaceae. It was first described by Heinrich Wilhelm Reichardt in 1871 based on specimens collected by Anton Jelinek in Île Saint-Paul and George Staunton on Île Amsterdam.

The specific epithet honors Sir George Leonard Staunton, 1st Baronet (1737–1801), an Anglo-Irish botanist who visited Île Amsterdam in February 1793, when he collected specimens of this species.

At the time of its description, Reichardt likened P. stauntonii to P. aucklandica from the subantarctic Auckland Islands, New Zealand, and other subantarctic and South American species. The similarities between different oceanic island species of Plantago may be caused by similar environmental stresses rather than shared ancestry.

== Distribution and habitat ==
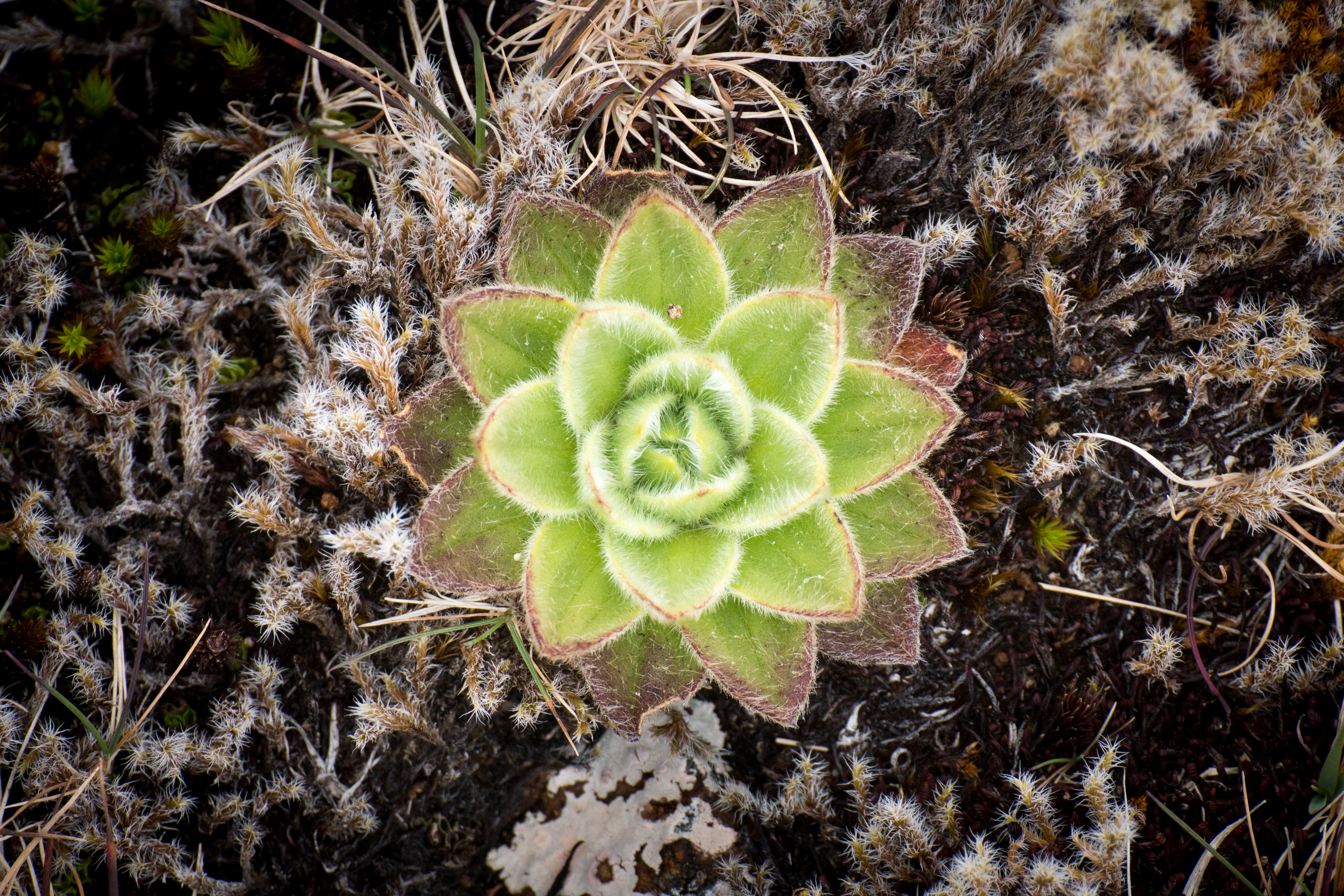
Rosette leaves of P. stauntonii

Plantago stauntonii is a plantain that is endemic to Île Amsterdam and Île Saint-Paul, French southern territories, in the Indian Ocean, where it is found on eroded ridges in fellfield at higher elevations, and occasionally at lower elevations.

== Phylogeny ==
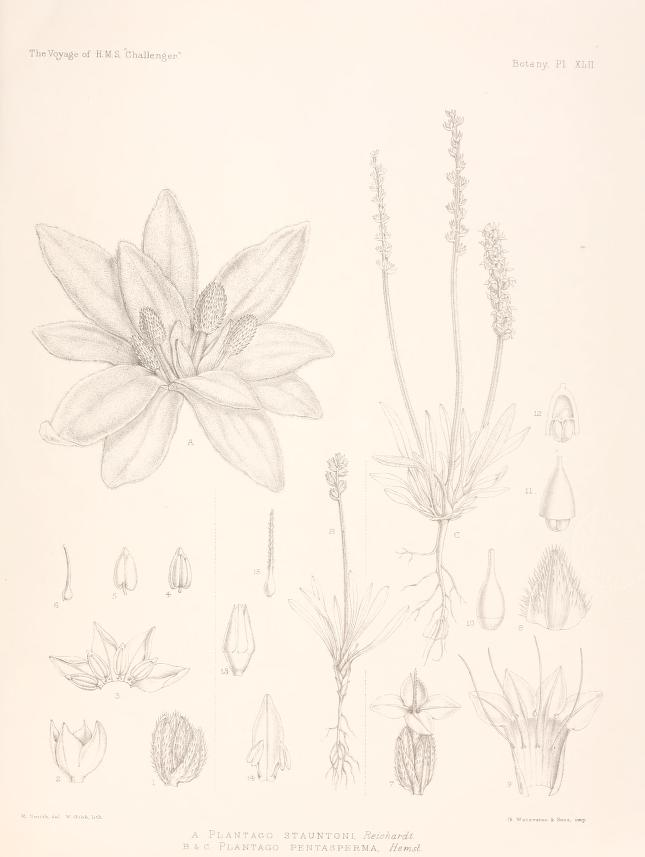
Plate 42 - A. (plant on left) Scientific illustration of Plantago stauntonii by Matilda Smith. (plants on right: B. & C. Plantago pentasperma)

In molecular phylogenetic studies focusing on Plantago species throughout the world, Plantago stauntonii was shown to be related to Plantago hedleyi (which is endemic to Lord Howe Island, Australia) and Plantago aucklandica (which is endemic to the subantarctic Auckland Islands, New Zealand).

== Conservation status ==
Plantago stauntonii is considered to be a "Restricted range species" due to its entire distribution being restricted to the French southern territories.
