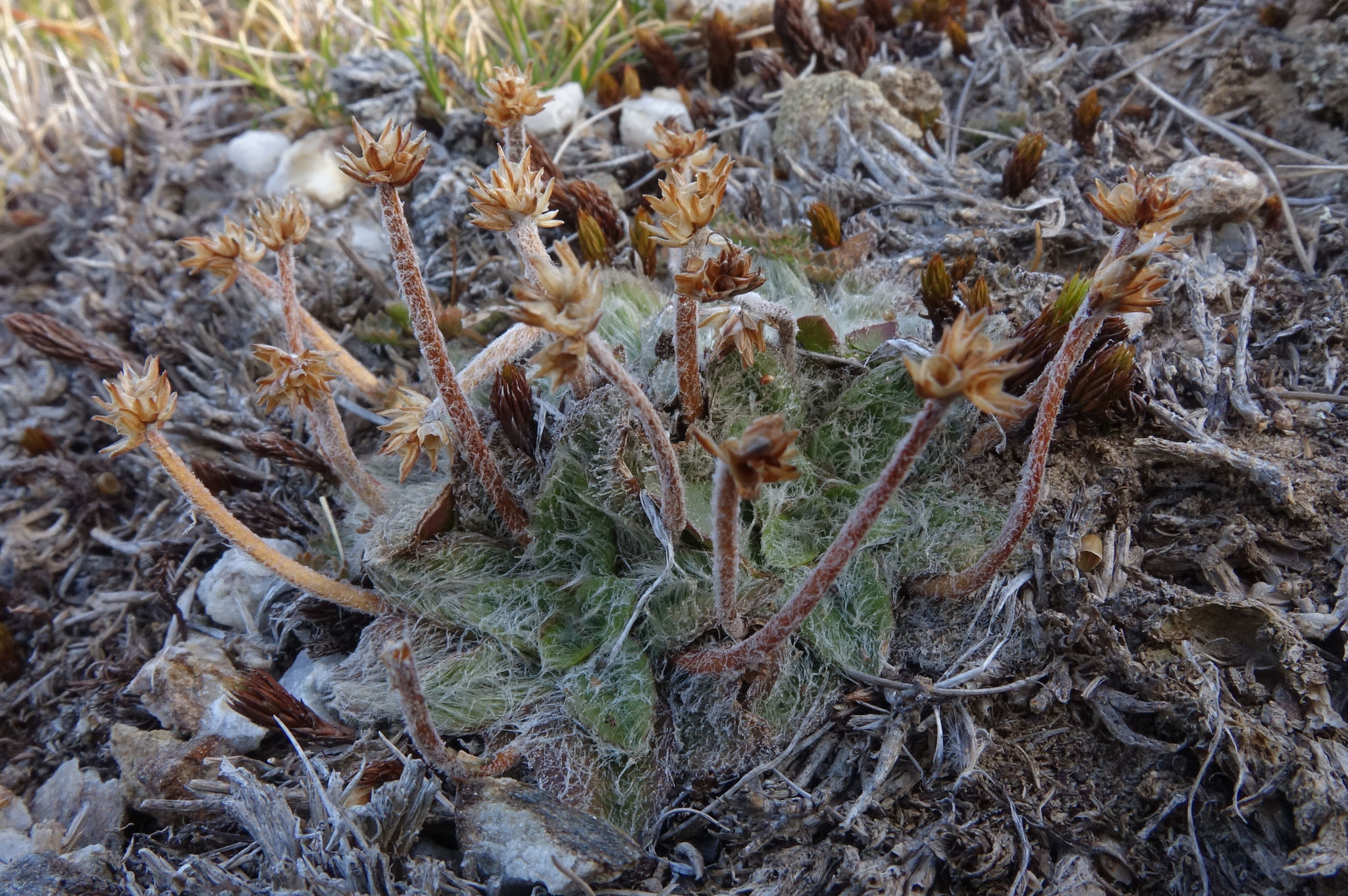
- Plantago lanigera from the Old Man Range, Otago, New Zealand

Conservation status
- Not Threatened (NZ TCS)

Scientific classification
- Kingdom: Plantae
- Clade: Tracheophytes
- Clade: Angiosperms
- Clade: Eudicots
- Clade: Asterids
- Order: Lamiales
- Family: Plantaginaceae
- Genus: Plantago
- Species: P. lanigera

Binomial name
- Plantago lanigera Hook.f.

Synonyms
- Plantago lanigera var. petriei Cheeseman

= Plantago lanigera =

Species of flowering plant in the plantain family

Plantago lanigera is a species of flowering plant in the family Plantaginaceae that is endemic to New Zealand. Joseph Dalton Hooker described P. lanigera in 1864. Plants of this species of plantain are perennial with a rosette habit, leaves widest above the middle, few small angular to rounded seeds per capsule, glabrous bracts and sepals, and punctate leaves. It is listed as Not Threatened.

== Taxonomy ==
Plantago lanigera Hook.f. is in the plant family Plantaginaceae. Joseph Dalton Hooker described P. lanigera in his Handbook of the New Zealand Flora in 1864.

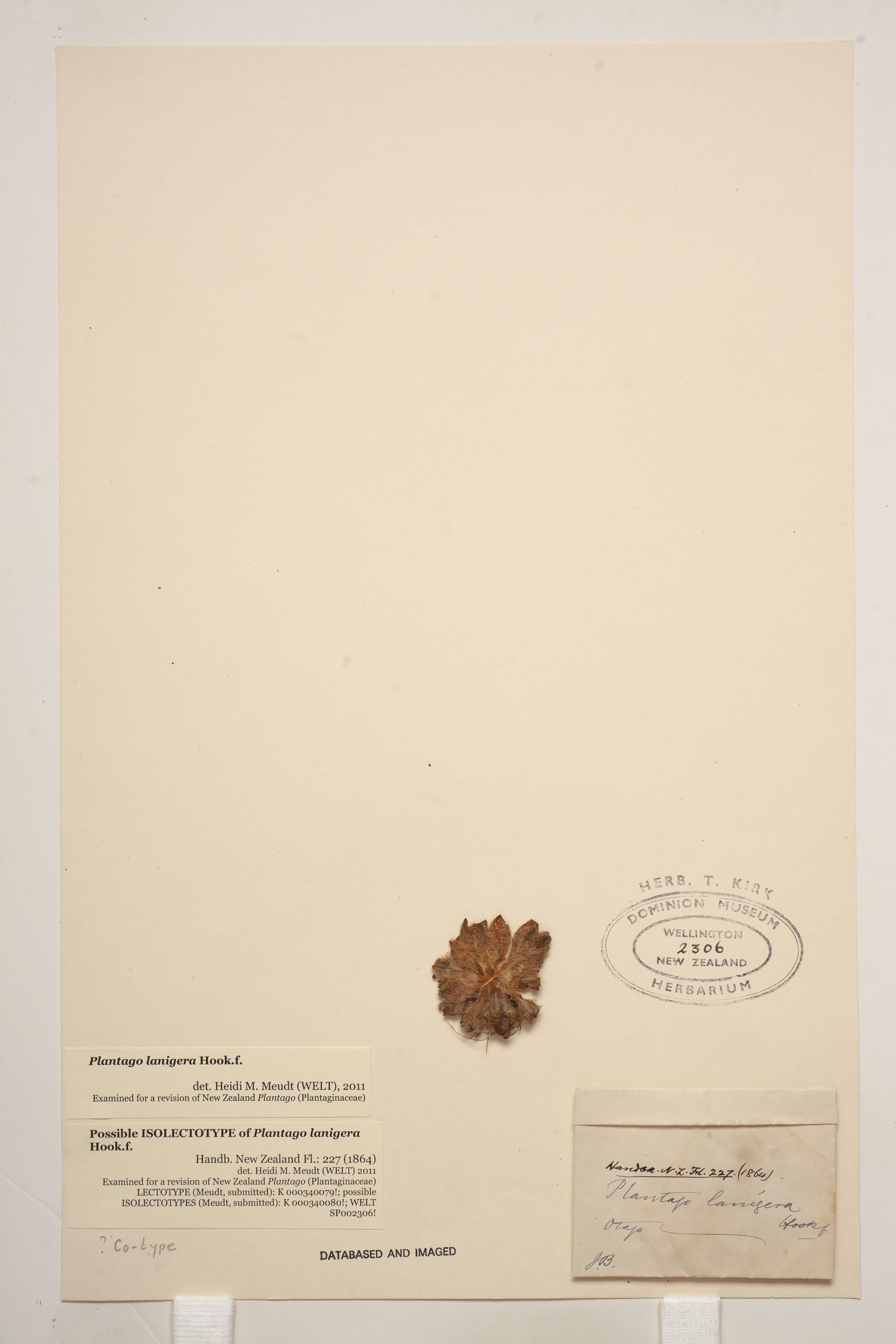
Possible isolectotype of P. lanigera from the Te Papa herbarium

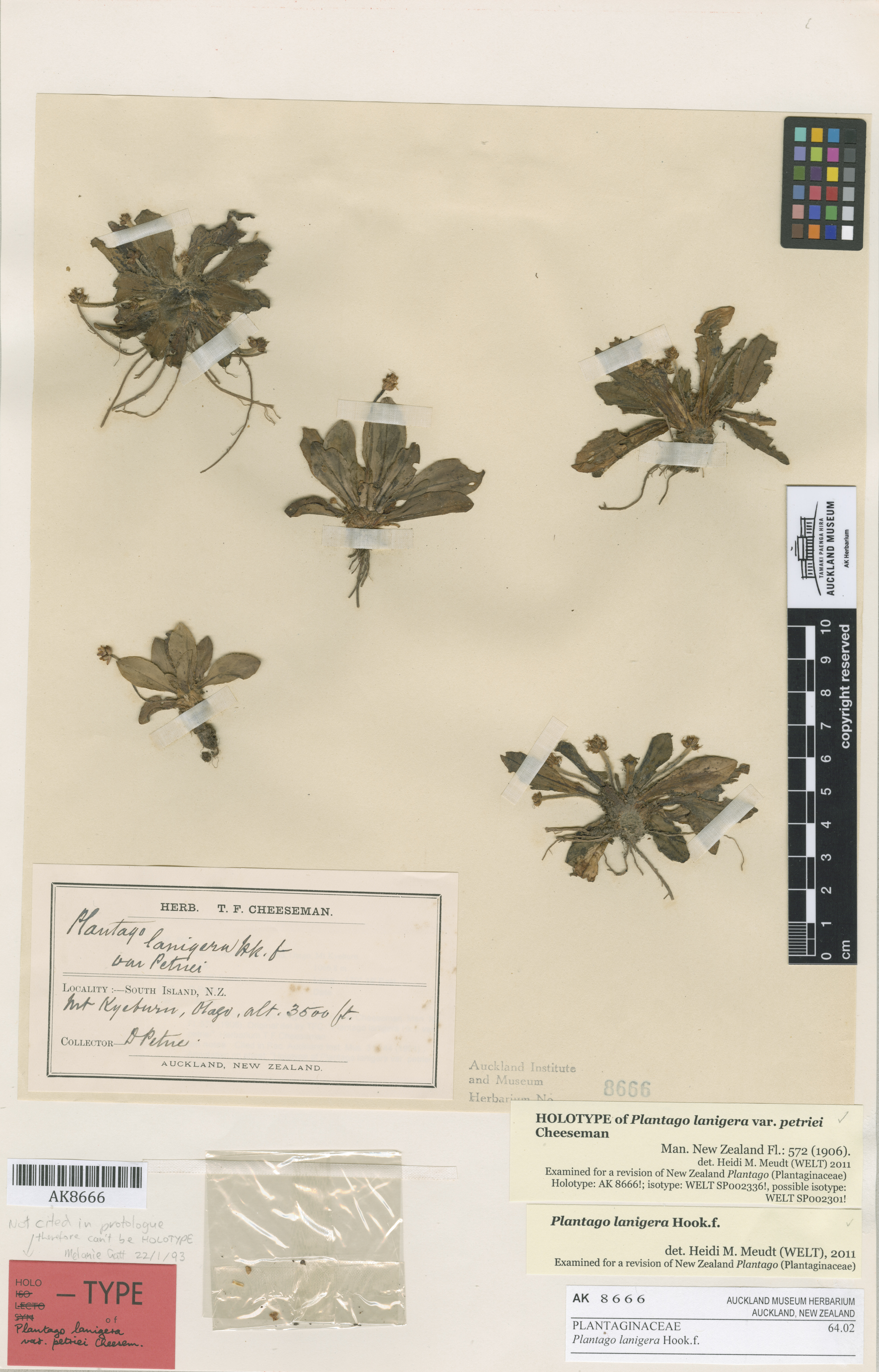
Holotype specimen of P. lanigera var. petriei from the Auckland Museum herbarium

The lectotype was collected by James Hector and John Buchanan from Otago, South Island, New Zealand and designated by Heidi Meudt. The lectotype is located at the herbarium at Royal Botanical Gardens, Kew (K), and there are possible isolectotypes at Kew and also at the herbarium of the Museum of New Zealand Te Papa Tongarewa (WELT).

Plantago lanigera is morphologically most similar to P. novae-zelandiae and P. unibracteata.

Compared to P. unibracteata and P. triandra, P. lanigera and P. novae-zelandiae (and other mainland New Zealand species) have leaves that are widest at or above the middle, and usually longer scapes, more flowers per spike, and fewer seeds per capsule. However, for plants lacking flowers or fruit, and with leaves that are widest near the middle, it can be difficult to determine whether a specimen is P. lanigera or P. unibracteata. In addition, the number, size and shape of the seeds of these two species can be very similar.

Plantago lanigera can be distinguished from P. novae-zelandiae by ovule and seed characters, especially a higher number of ovules (8–13 vs. 4), more seeds (4–13 vs. 1–4) that are smaller (0.6–1.5 mm long vs. 1.3–2.1) as well as angular or rounded and of various shapes (vs. rounded and ellipsoid).

== Description ==
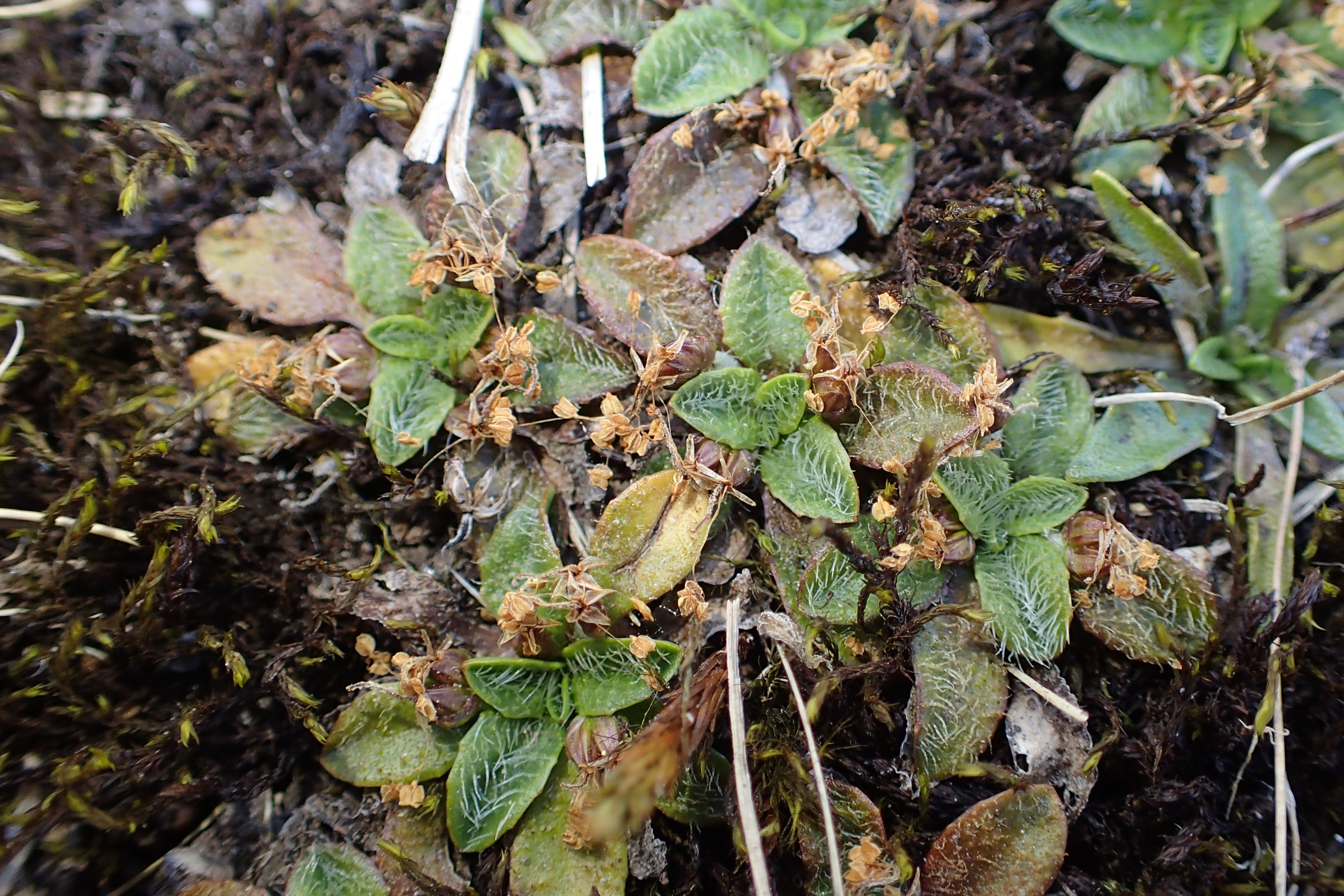
Flowering rosettes of P. lanigera

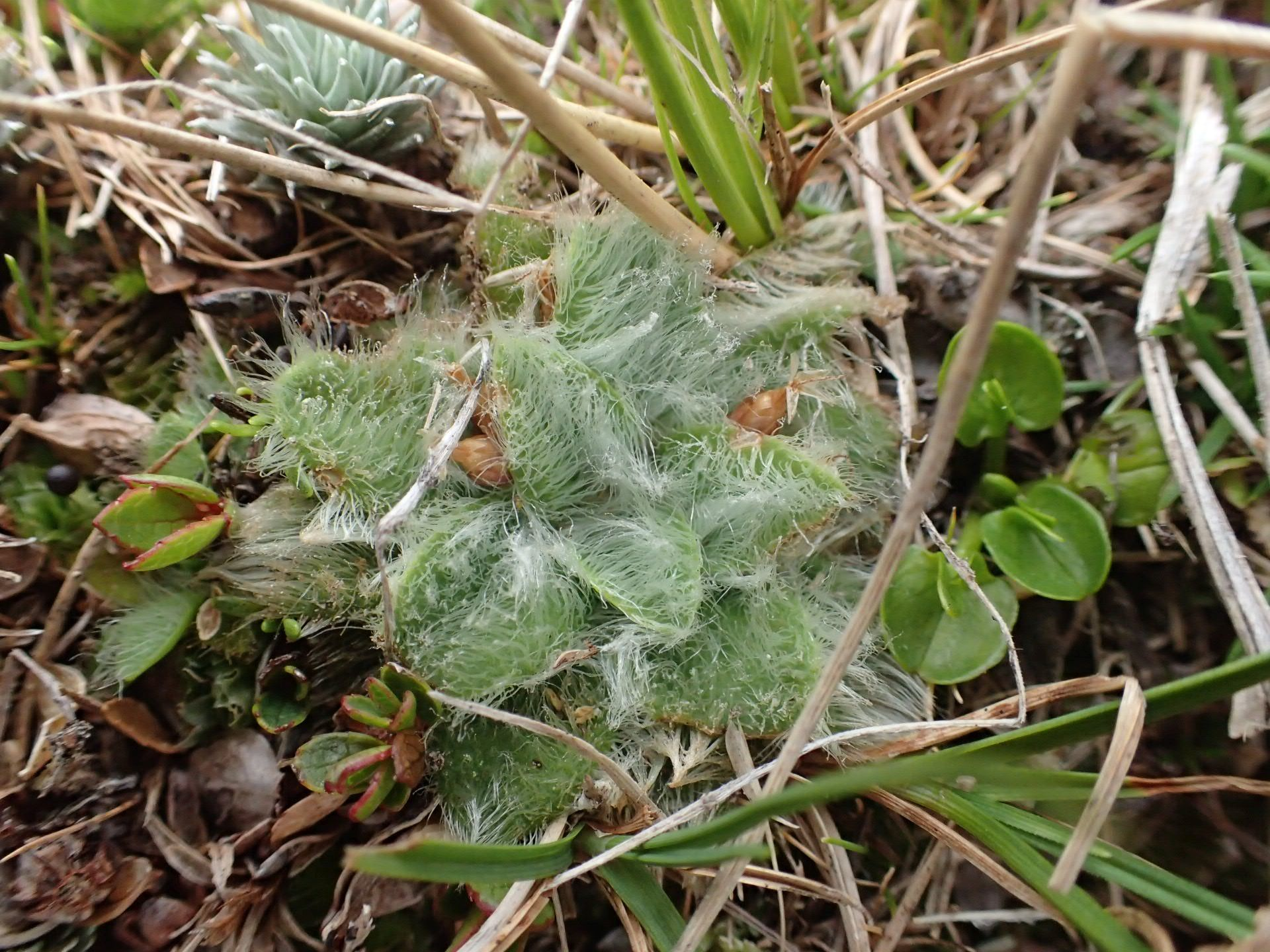
The very hairy leaves of P. lanigera

Plantago lanigera plants are small rosettes with a primary root up to 9 mm thick, with up to 21 usually narrowly angular-ovate or angular-ovate leaves, and with visible, short (<15 mm long), rust-coloured leaf axillary hairs in the basal rosette. The leaves have 1–3 veins, are 12–64 mm long (including petiole) and up to 16 mm wide, usually punctate, usually sparsely to densely hairy on the upper surface, usually glabrous on the lower surface. The leaf has an acute or obtuse apex, and its edges are smooth or wavy or with up to 10 minute teeth. The petiole is usually distinguishable from the leaf lamina, and up to 28 mm long. Each rosette plant has up to 13 erect inflorescences which can be up to 116 mm long. The scapes are smooth and sparsely to densely hairy. The spikes are globose or ovoid with 1–9 densely crowded flowers. Each flower has 1 small bract that is broadly ovate to very broadly ovate and usually glabrous. The calyx is 2.0–3.4 mm long, 1.4–3.0 mm wide, glabrous. The corolla tube is 1.7–2.6 mm long, corolla lobes 1.1–2.3 mm long, stamen filaments 1.9–6.7 mm long, anthers 0.7–1.4 mm long, and style 2.6–6.8 mm long and densely hairy. The ovary is 0.6–1.7 mm long, with up to 13 ovules. The fruit is a dry, dehiscent capsule with circumsessile dehiscence, broadly ellipsoid, globose or ovoid, widest at or below middle, 1.8–4.2 mm long and 1.4–3.0 mm wide. Each capsule has 4–13 uniform rust or brown seeds 0.6–1.5 mm long, ellipsoid, rhomboid or angular-ovoid.

Plantago lanigera flowers from October to February and fruits from November to April.

The chromosome number of Plantago lanigera is 2n=12 or 2n=24 (the latter includes nine individuals listed as 'P. novae-zelandiae diploid' and 'P. novae-zelandiae tetraploid').

== Distribution and habitat ==
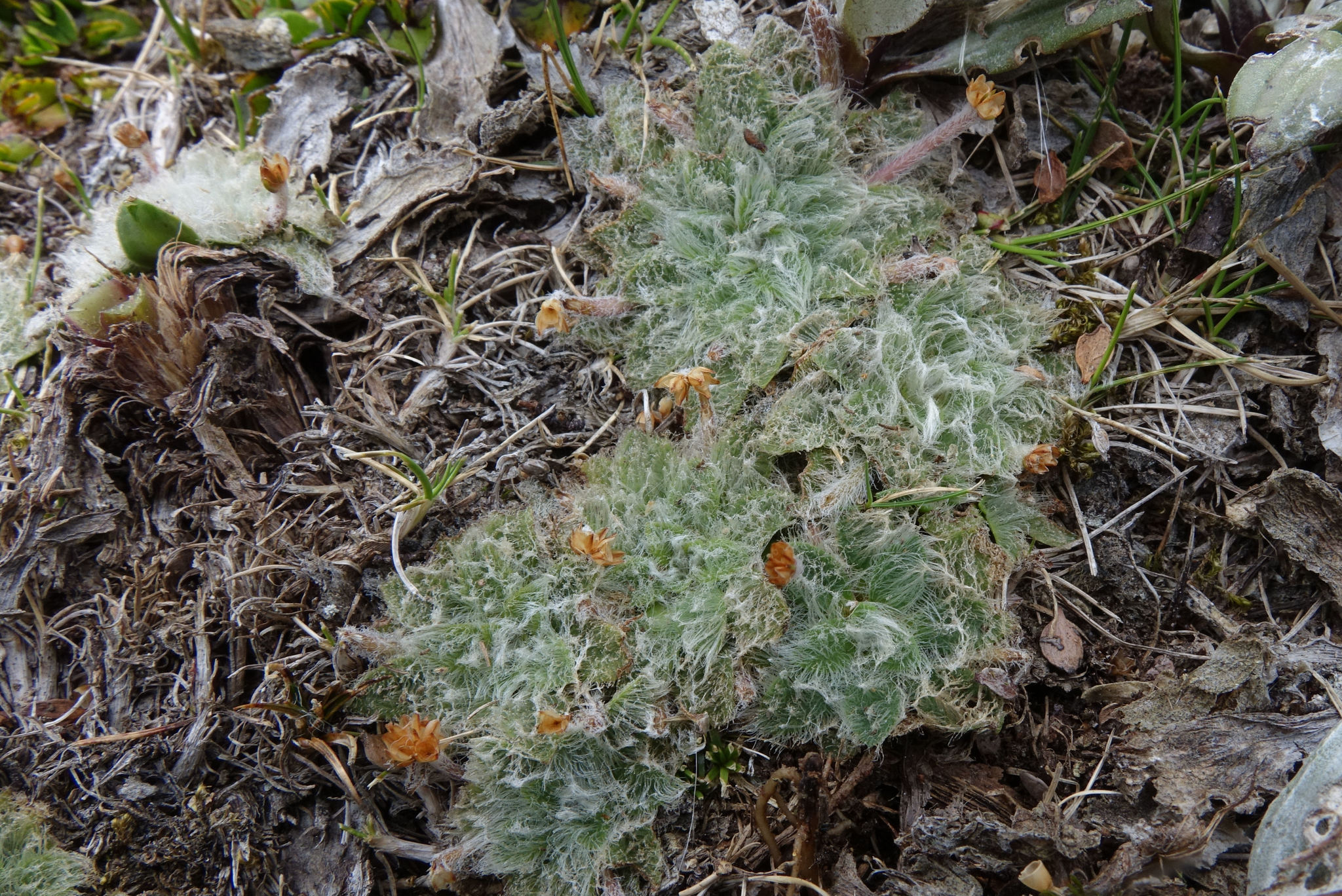
Fruiting rosettes of Plantago lanigera

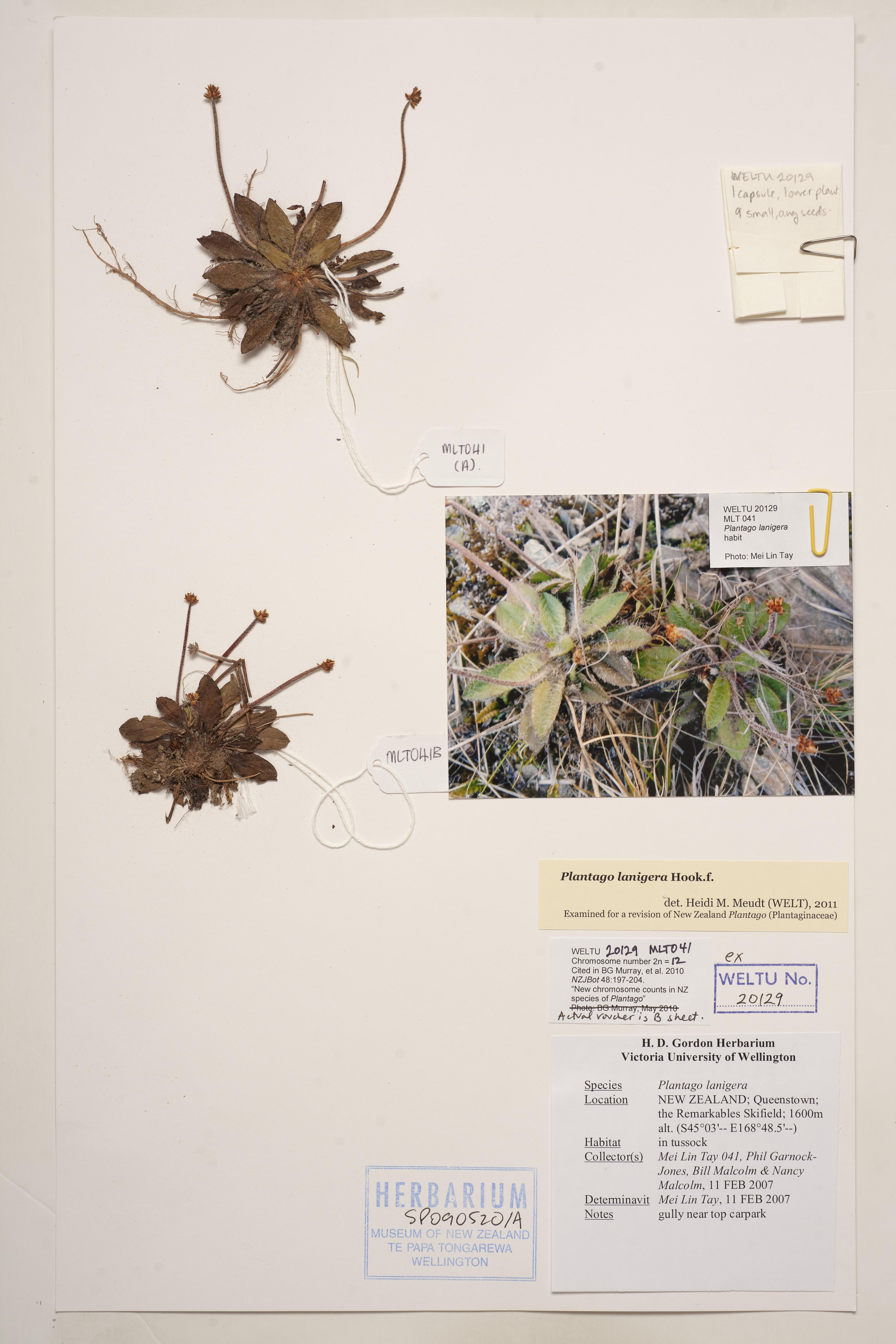
Te Papa herbarium specimen of P. lanigera from the Remarkables Skifield near Queenstown, South Island, New Zealand

Plantago lanigera is a plantain that is endemic to the North, South and Stewart Islands of New Zealand.

In the North Island it is found in Taranaki and Southern North Island regions, whereas on the South Island it is found in Western Nelson, Westland, Canterbury, Otago, Fiordland and Southland regions.

It grows in herbfields, grasslands and shrublands, in bogs, on the edges of streams and tarns, on rocks or ridges, in damp or wet areas, from 580 to 1820 m above sea level.

== Phylogeny ==
In phylogenetic analyses of Australasian species of Plantago using standard DNA sequencing markers (nuclear ribosomal DNA, chloroplast DNA, and mitochondrial DNA regions) and amplified fragment length polymorphisms (AFLPs), Plantago lanigera was monophyletic and strongly supported as being closely related to the mainland New Zealand species P. obconica and P. novae-zelandiae as well as the subantarctic species P. aucklandica.

Similarly, the two sampled individuals of P. lanigera were closely related to the sole individuals of P. novae-zelandiae and P. aucklandica in another phylogenetic study focusing on Plantago species throughout the world using whole chloroplast genomes. Individuals of P. lanigera showed high intraspecific variation in another study using only nuclear ribosomal DNA (internal transcribed spacer region). Finally, the species was not included in another phylogenetic studies focusing on oceanic island Plantago species using standard DNA sequencing markers.

== Conservation status ==
Plantago lanigera is listed as Not Threatened in the most recent assessment (2017–2018) of the New Zealand Threatened Classification for plants.
