= Mount Gower =

Mountain on Lord Howe Island, Australia

- Big Hill
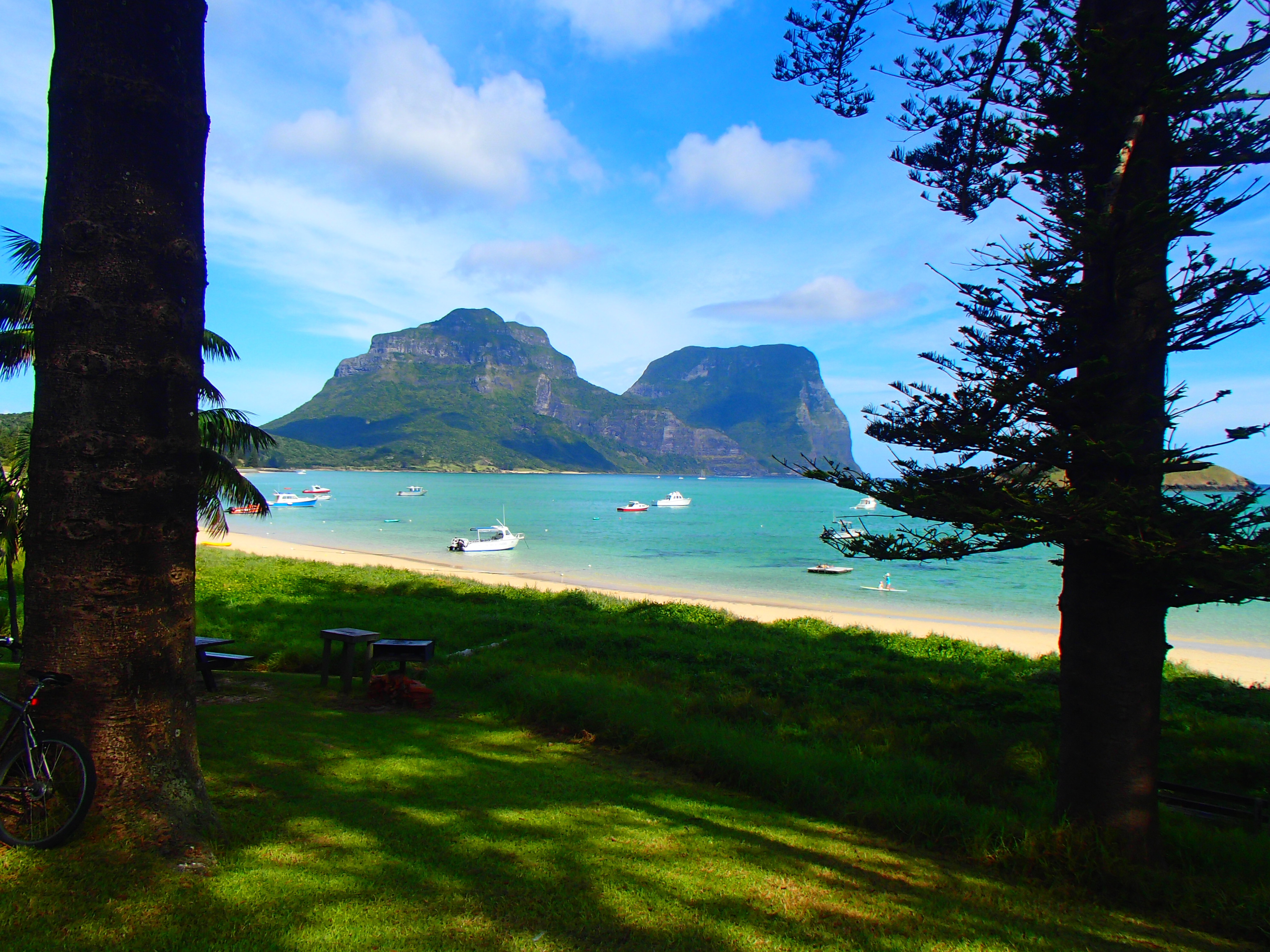
- Lord Howe Island's two southern mountains in the background, Mount Lidgbird (left) and Mount Gower (right)

Highest point
- Elevation: 875 m (2,871 ft)
- Prominence: 875 m (2,871 ft)
- Coordinates: 31°35′25″S 159°04′20″E

Geography
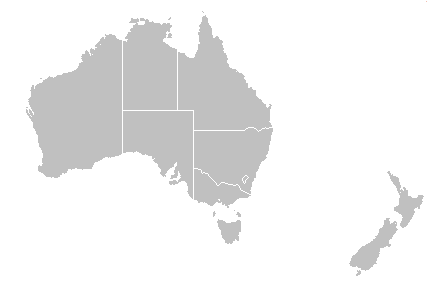
- Location within Australia and New Zealand
- Location: Lord Howe Island, New South Wales, Australia

Geology
- Mountain type: Volcanic

Mount Gower (also known as Big Hill), is the highest mountain on Australia's subtropical Lord Howe Island in the Tasman Sea. With a height of 875 metres (2,871 ft) above sea level, and a relatively flat 27-hectare (67-acre) summit plateau, it stands at the southern end of Lord Howe, just south of the island's second highest peak, the 777-metre (2,549 ft) high Mount Lidgbird, from which it is separated by the saddle at the head of Erskine Valley.

Ascending Gower involves a popular guided 8-hour hike that is said to be strenuous but that does not require climbing skill or experience.

The rainforest-covered mountain is capped with a cloud forest containing many of the island's endemic plants.

== See also ==
- List of mountains in Australia
