= Mount Lidgbird =

Mountain in Australia

- Mount Ledgbird; Big Hill
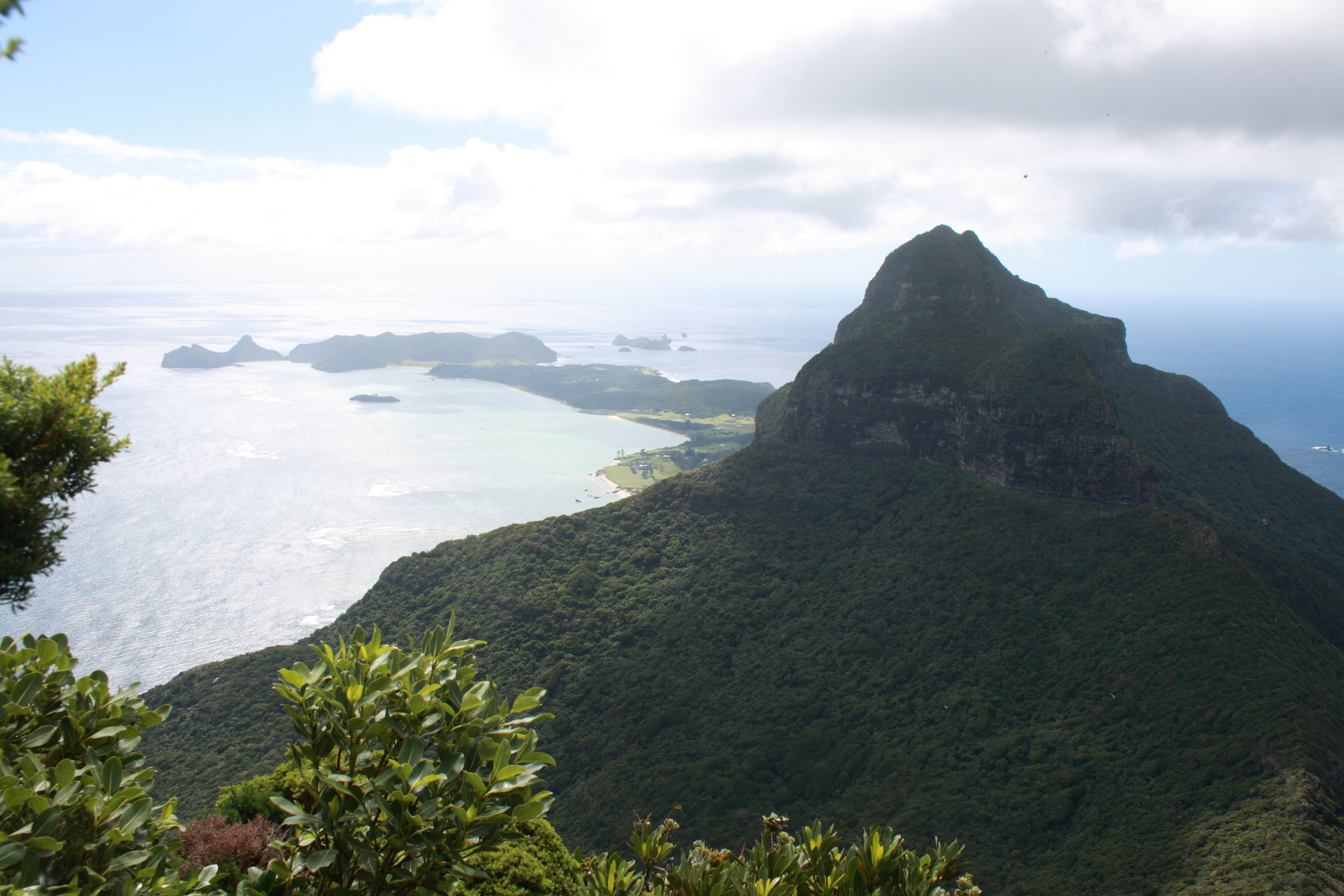
- Mount Lidgbird photographed from the summit of Mount Gower

Highest point
- Elevation: 777 m (2,549 ft)
- Coordinates: 31°33′S 159°05′E

Geography
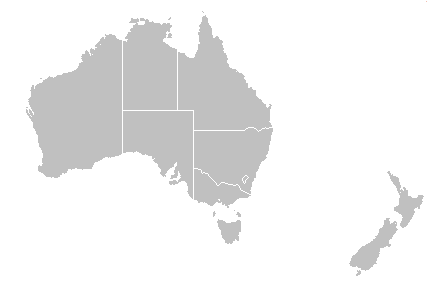
- Location within Australia and New Zealand
- Location: Lord Howe Island, New South Wales, Australia

Geology
- Mountain type: Volcanic

Mount Lidgbird, also Mount Ledgbird and Big Hill, is located in the southern section of Lord Howe Island, just north of Mount Gower, from which it is separated by the saddle at the head of Erskine Valley, and has its peak at 777 metres (2,549 ft) above sea level.

The trek to the summit is for expert climbers only. Ropes are needed to scale the cliffs and slippery, steep terrain. In comparison, Mount Gower is an easy hike. Halfway up the mountain is Goat House Cave, a former shelter for 19th-century Kentia palm gatherers. From this spot, visitors can see nesting masked boobies and numerous red-tailed tropicbirds.

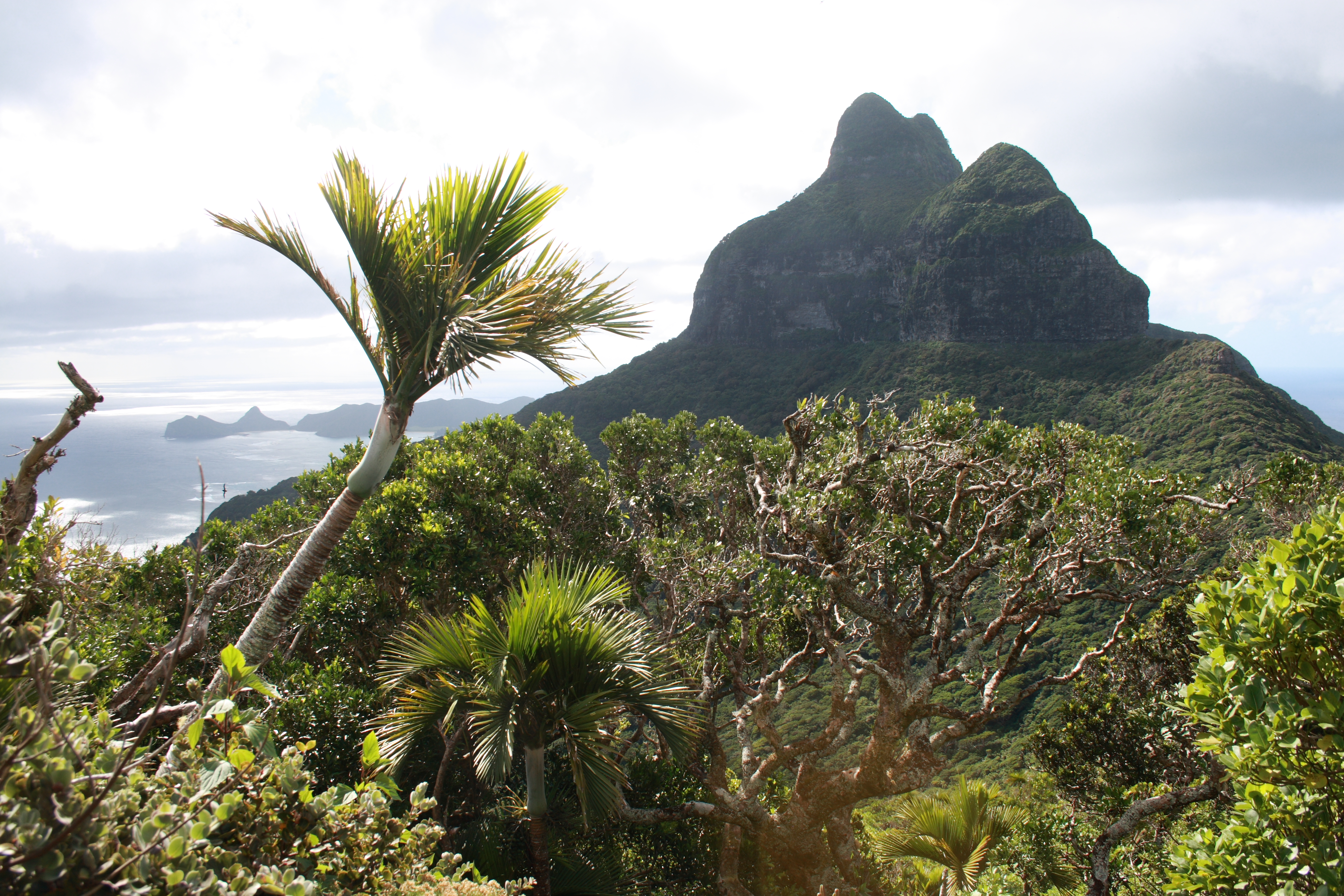
Mount Lidgbird photographed from the ascent of Mount Gower

== Etymology ==
Mount Lidgbird is named by the naval officer Captain Henry Lidgbird Ball in honour of his father, George Lidgbird Ball. Ball junior first sighted Lord Howe Island in 1788 while he was on his way to Norfolk Island in the ship HMS Supply. He also named the nearby rock outcrop Ball's Pyramid.

== Flora ==
Cryptocarya forest, one of two types found on the island, the other being palm forest, is found in patches on the slopes of the mountain between elevations of 350 to 600 metres (1,150 to 1,970 ft) above sea level.

Palm species growing on the mountain include Hedyscepe and Lepidorrhachis.

== Climbing ==
The North Ridge of Mount Lidgbird was climbed for the first time on 21 August 2011 by Greg Mortimer OAM and Dick Smith AC.

== See also ==
- List of mountains in Australia
