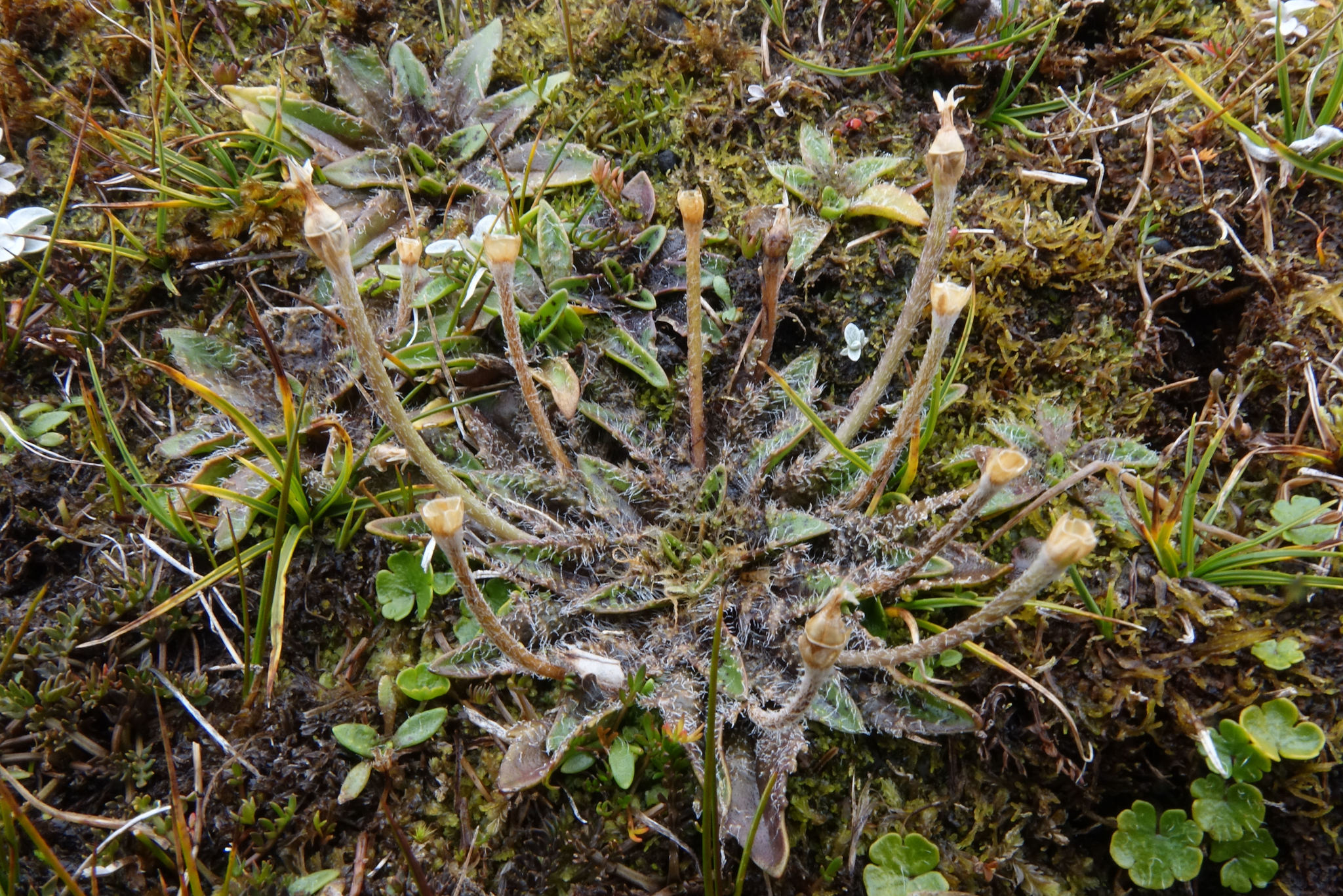
- Plantago unibracteata plant with fruiting capsules, Otago, New Zealand

Conservation status
- Not Threatened (NZ TCS)

Scientific classification
- Kingdom: Plantae
- Clade: Tracheophytes
- Clade: Angiosperms
- Clade: Eudicots
- Clade: Asterids
- Order: Lamiales
- Family: Plantaginaceae
- Genus: Plantago
- Species: P. unibracteata

Binomial name
- Plantago unibracteata Rahn (1996)

Synonyms
- Plantago uniflora Hook.f. (1854)

= Plantago unibracteata =

Species of flowering plant in the plantain family

Plantago unibracteata is a species of flowering plant in the family Plantaginaceae that is endemic to New Zealand. Knud Rahn gave the species its current name in 1996, based on Joseph Dalton Hooker's original description (as P. uniflora) in 1854. Plants of this species of plantain are perennial with a rosette habit, with narrowly angular-ovate leaves with few (less than 10) teeth, and numerous angular or rounded seeds.

== Taxonomy ==
Plantago unibracteata Rahn is in the plant family Plantaginaceae. It was originally described by British botanist Joseph Dalton Hooker as Plantago uniflora in 1854, which was an illegitimate name due to another plant previously described by Carl Linnaeus already having that name. Danish botanist Knud Rahn gave the species the replacement name P. unibracteata in 1996.

The holotype was collected by William Colenso from the Ruahine mountains, North Island, New Zealand. The holotype is located at the herbarium at Royal Botanical Gardens, Kew (K).

Plantago unibracteata is morphologically most similar to P. obconica and P. triandra. Together with P. triandra, it can be distinguished from other New Zealand plantains by the combination of the following characters: leaves that are widest at or below the middle, leaves with only one visible vein, short scapes (less than 72 mm long), usually one (up to 3) flowers per spike.

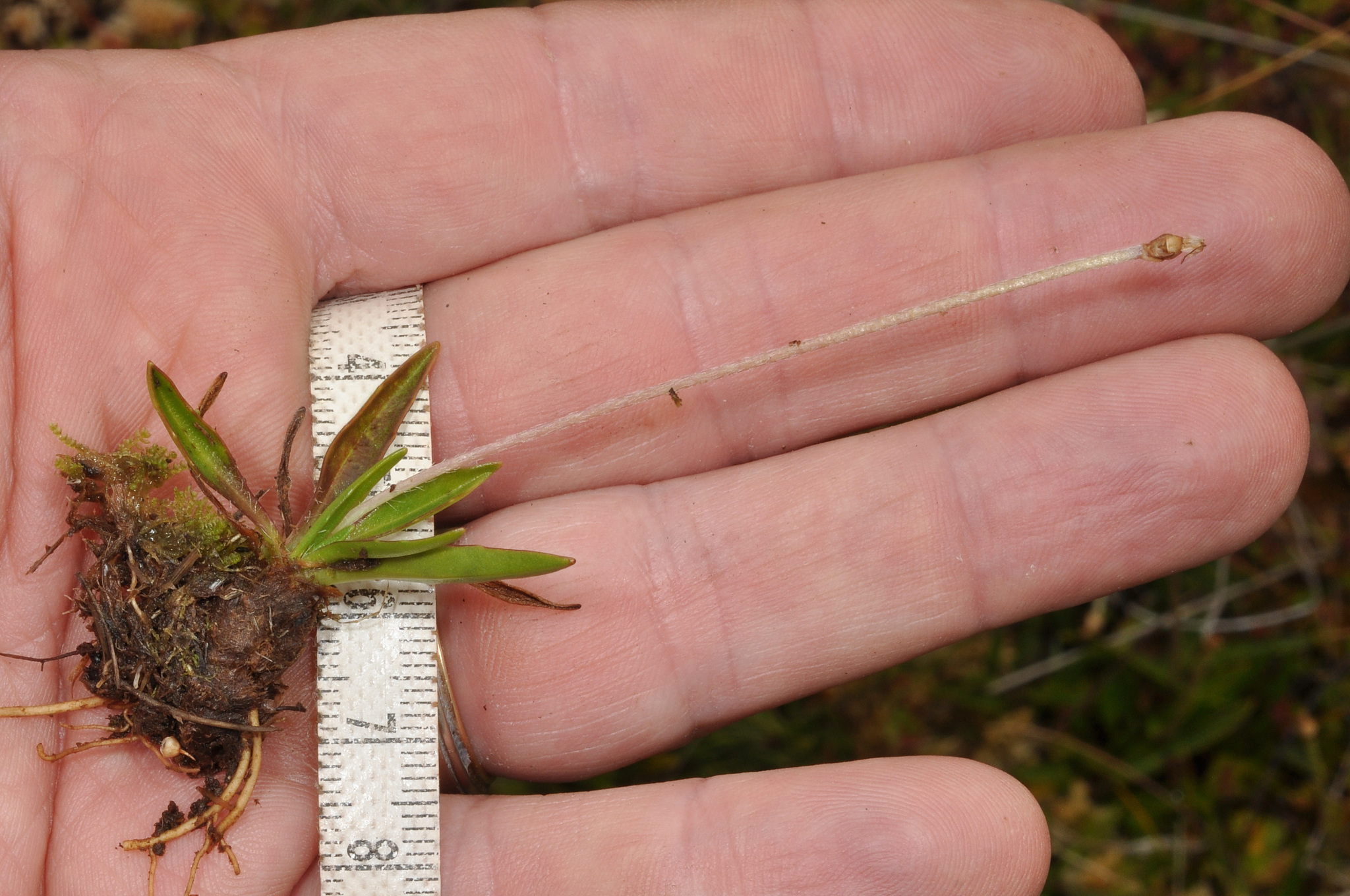
Whole, fruiting plant of P. unibracteata observed in Canterbury, South Island, New Zealand

P. unibracteata can be distinguished from P. triandra by its few leaf teeth (usually 4–10 rather than 10 or more in P. triandra), longer calyx (1.7–3.7 mm long vs. 0.4–1.8 mm long) and fewer seeds (5–23 vs. 8–42) that can be angular or rounded (rather than angular only in P. triandra).

== Description ==
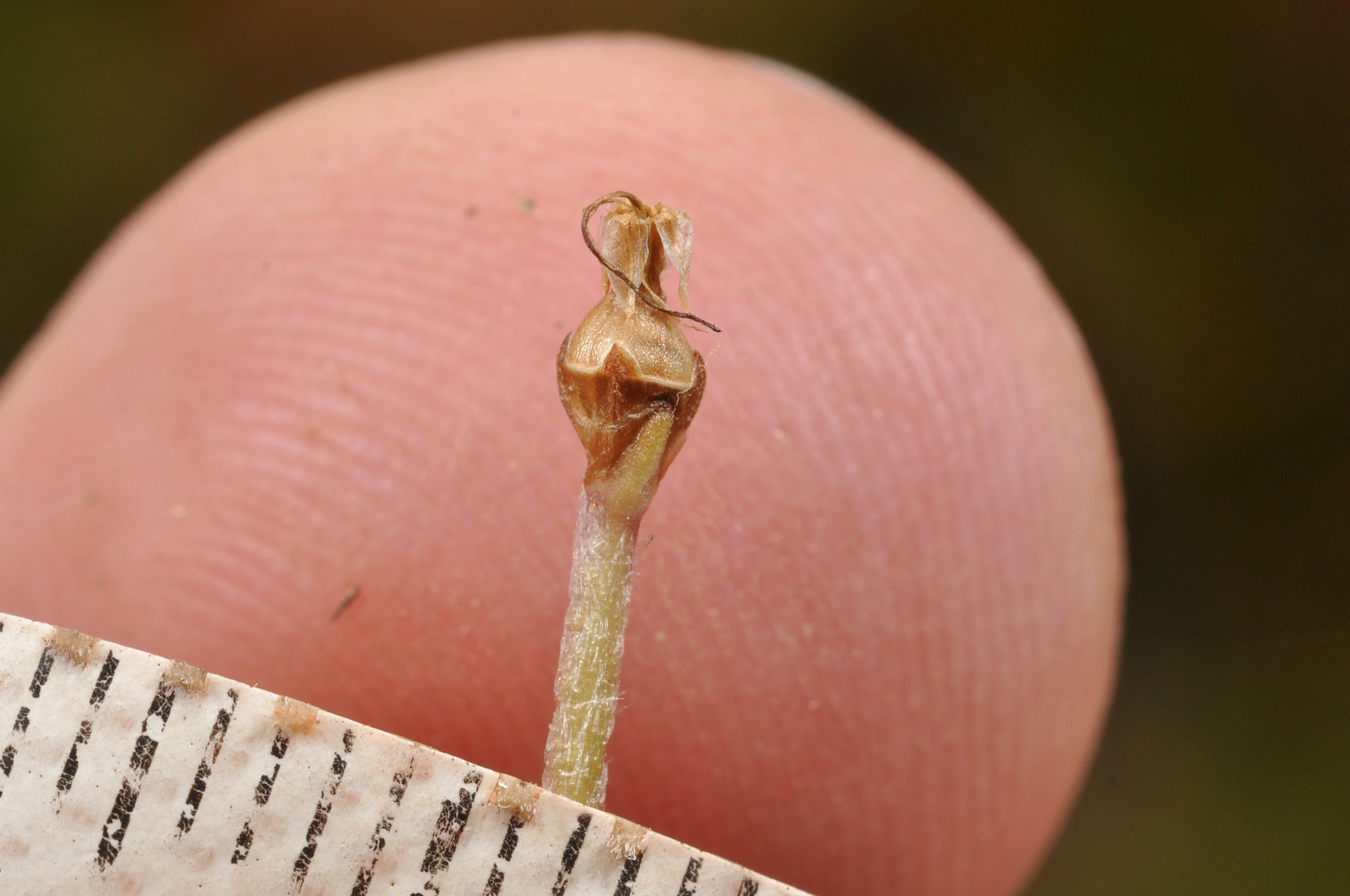
Fruiting capsule of P. unibracteata

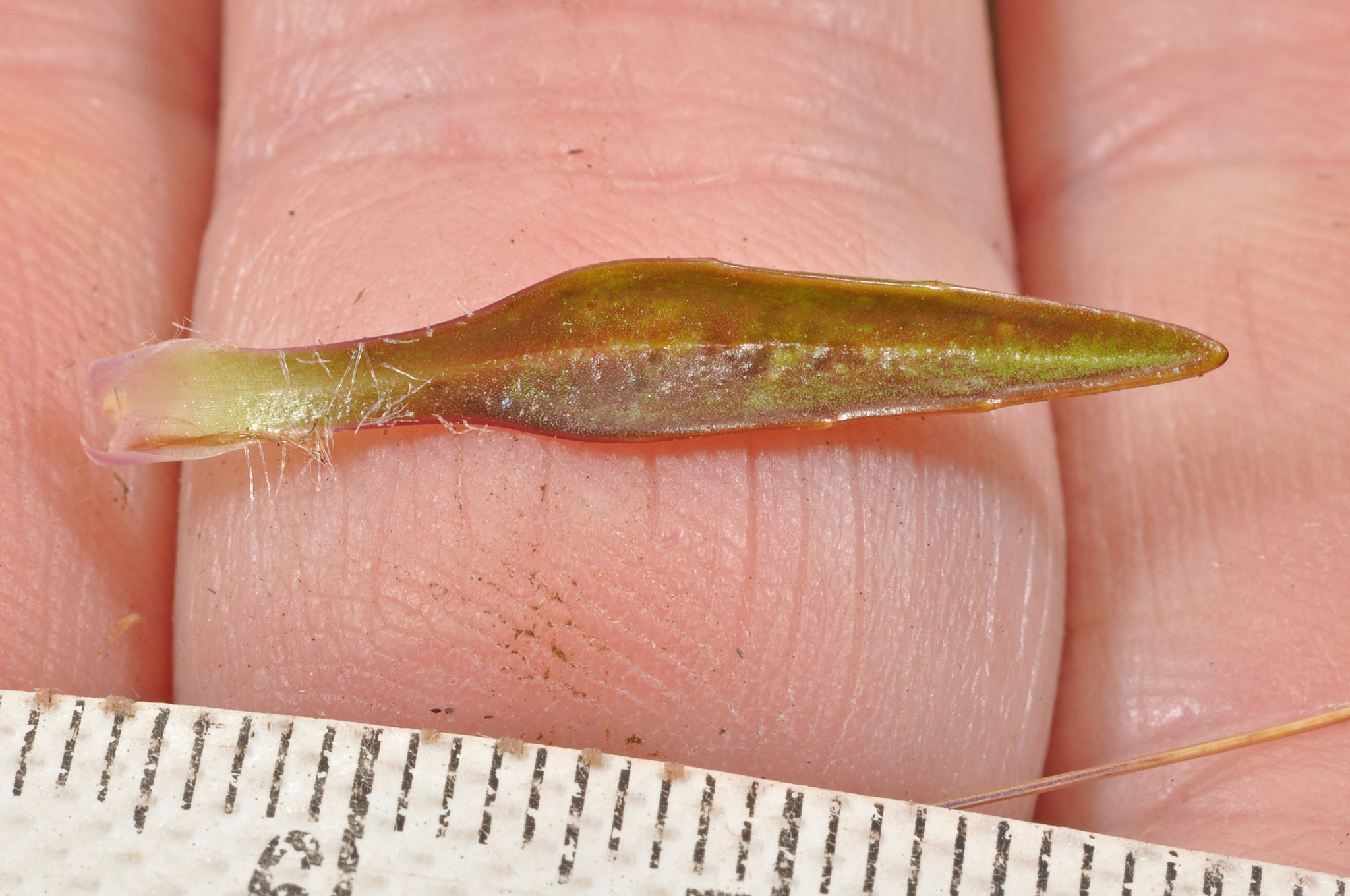
Leaf of P. unibracteata

Plantago unibracteata plants are small rosettes with a primary root up to 10 mm thick, with up to 34 usually narrowly angular-ovate leaves, and with visible, short (<13 mm long), rust-coloured leaf axillary hairs in the basal rosette. The leaves have 1 vein, are 8–46 mm long (including petiole) and up to 13 mm wide, usually punctate, sparsely hairy or with some isolated hairs on lower half of leaf on the upper surface, glabrous on the lower surface. The leaf has an acute apex, and its edges are smooth, wavy or with up to 10 small teeth. The petiole is usually distinguishable from the leaf lamina, and up to 24 mm long. Each rosette plant has up to 12 erect inflorescences which can be up to 72 mm long. The scapes are smooth and sparsely to densely hairy. The spikes are globose with 1–2 densely crowded flowers. Each flower has 1–2 small bracts that are narrowly ovate to very broadly ovate and usually glabrous. The calyx is 1.6–3.7 mm long, 1.6–3.6 mm wide, mostly glabrous but rarely with a hair at the apex. The corolla tube is 1.7–3.6 mm long, corolla lobes 1.0–2.5 mm long, stamen filaments 3.1–6.3 mm long, anthers 1.2–1.7 mm long, and style 3.4–9.3 mm long and densely hairy. The ovary is 0.8–1.7 mm long, with up to 23 ovules. The fruit is a dry, dehiscent capsule with circumsessile dehiscence, ellipsoid, broadly ellipsoid or globose, widest at middle, 2.1–4.9 mm long and 1.8–3.9 mm wide. Each capsule has 5–23 uniform rust or brown seeds 0.6–2.2 mm long, usually rhomboid or angular-ovoid.

Plantago unibracteata flowers from October to February and fruits from December to May.

The chromosome number of Plantago unibracteata is 2n=60 or 2n=72.

== Distribution and habitat ==
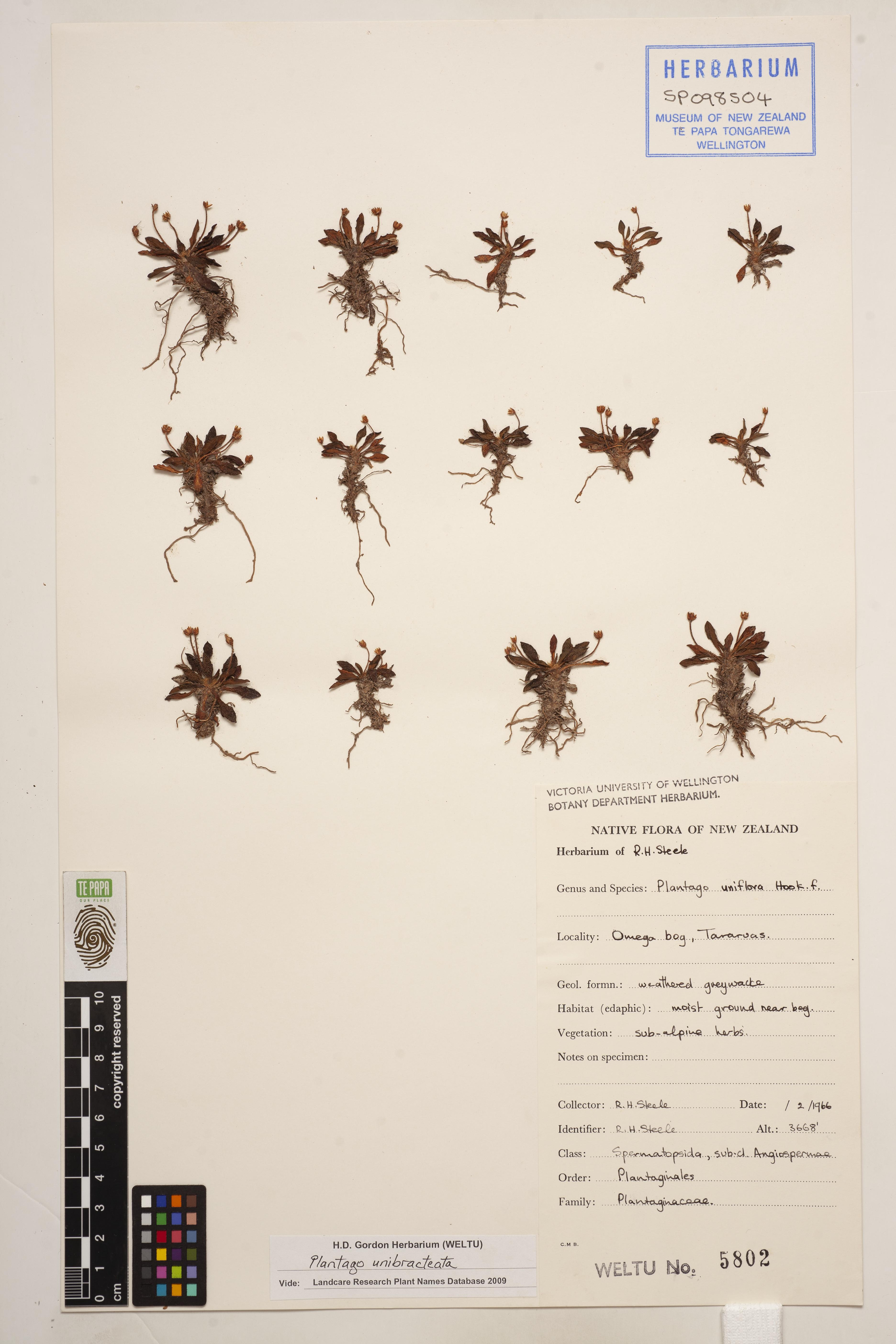
Te Papa herbarium specimen of P. unibracteata collected by Rosemary Steele in the Tararua Range, North Island, New Zealand in 1966

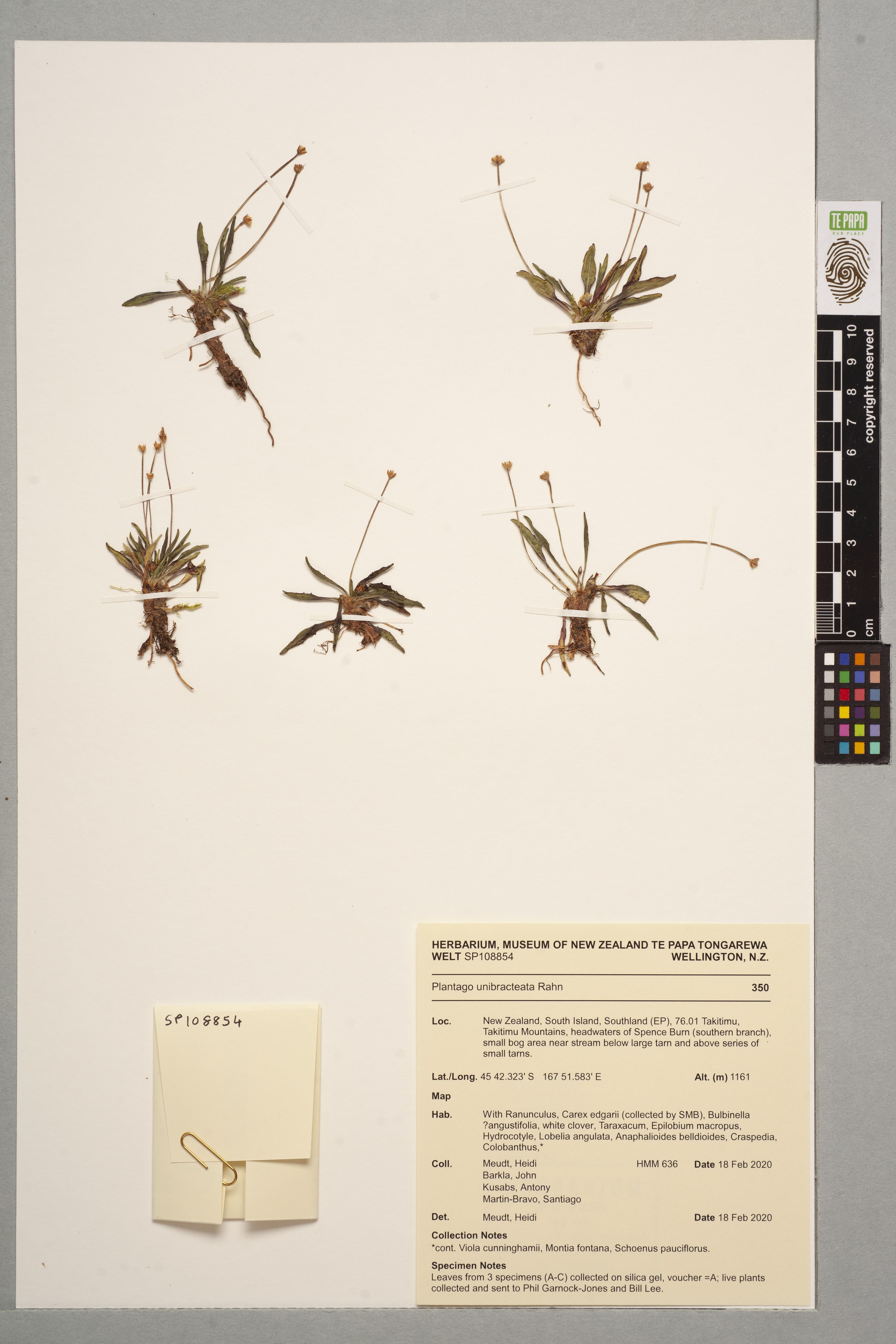
Te Papa herbarium specimen of P. unibracteata collected in Southland, South Island, New Zealand in 2020

Plantago unibracteata is a plantain that is endemic to the North, South and Stewart Islands of New Zealand. In the North Island it is found in Volcanic Plateau, Taranaki, and Southern North Island regions, whereas on the South Island it is found in Western Nelson, Westland, Canterbury, Otago and Fiordland Southland regions.

It is found on exposed ridges, herbfields and grasslands in bogs, on the edges of streams and tarns, in damp or wet areas, from 440 to 1830 m above sea level.

== Phylogeny ==
Plantago unibracteata was included in phylogenetic analyses of Australasian species of Plantago using standard DNA sequencing markers (nuclear ribosomal DNA, chloroplast DNA, and mitochondrial DNA regions). In that study, Plantago unibracteata was moderately to strongly supported as sister or closely related to another New Zealand species, Plantago triandra.

Similarly, Plantago unibracteata was closely related to P. triandra in a phylogenetic study of the New Zealand species using amplified fragment length polymorphisms (AFLPs). These two species formed a clade with high support, but the species themselves were not monophyletic. It was hypothesized that decaploid and dodecaploid P. unibracteata are allopolyploids that have evolved multiple times from octoploid P. triandra and another species.

Individuals of P. unibracteata and P. triandra could not be distinguished in another study using only nuclear ribosomal DNA (internal transcribed spacer region) with several individuals of each species sampled. However, the sole individual of P. unibracteata was not sister to the sole individual of P. triandra in another phylogenetic study focusing on Plantago species throughout the world using whole chloroplast genomes, although they were in the same larger clade. Finally, the species was not included in another phylogenetic studies focusing on oceanic island Plantago species using standard DNA sequencing markers.

== Conservation status ==
Plantago triandra is listed as Not Threatened in the most recent assessment (2017–2018) of the New Zealand Threatened Classification for plants.
