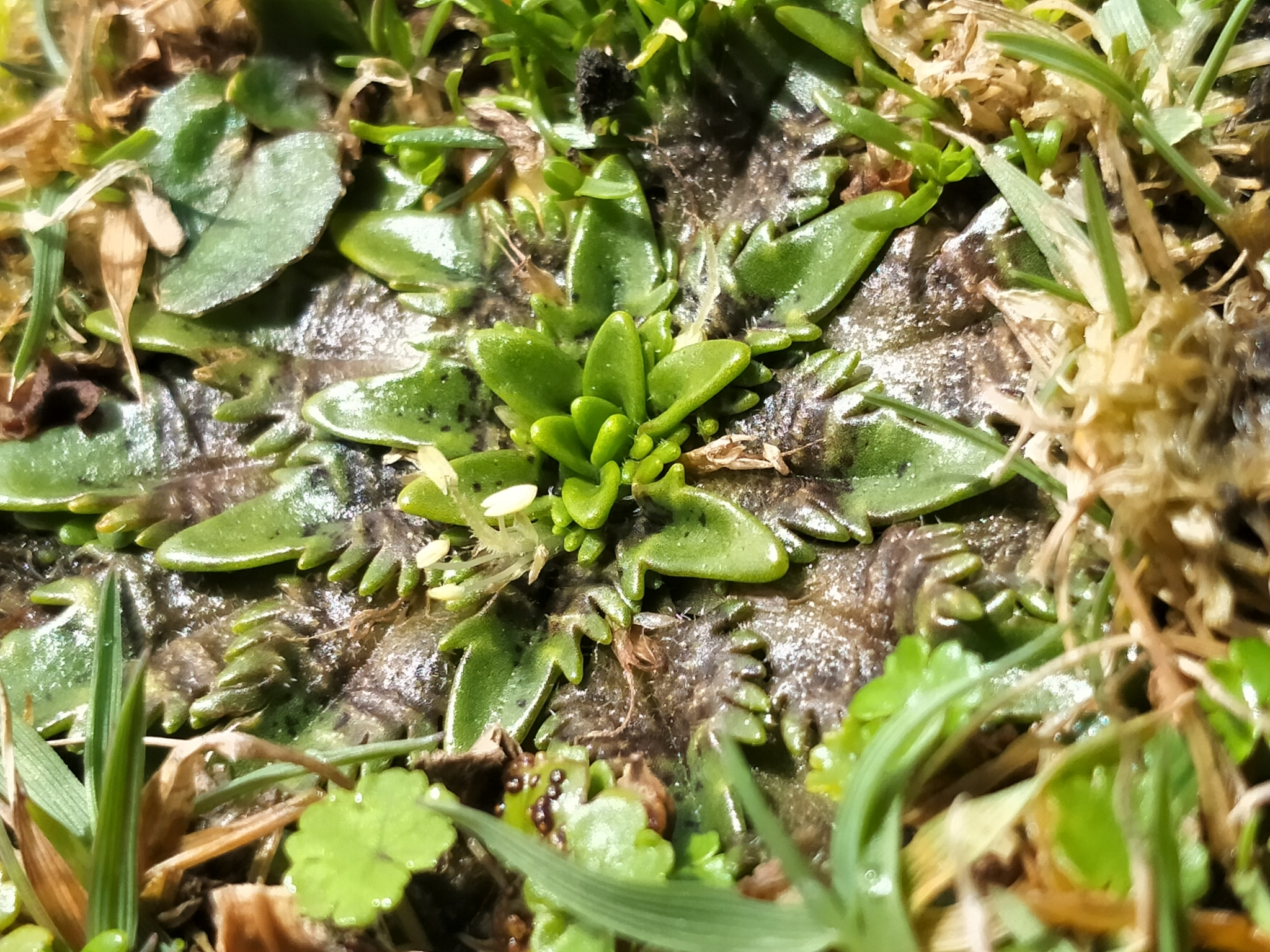
- Plantago triandra in flower from Southland, New Zealand

Conservation status
- Not Threatened (NZ TCS)

Scientific classification
- Kingdom: Plantae
- Clade: Tracheophytes
- Clade: Angiosperms
- Clade: Eudicots
- Clade: Asterids
- Order: Lamiales
- Family: Plantaginaceae
- Genus: Plantago
- Species: P. triandra

Binomial name
- Plantago triandra Berggr.

Synonyms
- Plantago masoniae Cheeseman; Plantago triandra subsp. masoniae

= Plantago triandra =

Species of flowering plant in the plantain family

Plantago triandra is a species of flowering plant in the family Plantaginaceae that is endemic to New Zealand. Sven Berggren described the species in 1877. Plants of this species of plantain are perennial with a rosette habit, with angular-ovate leaves, tiny calyces, numerous seeds, and often sessile flowers and fruiting capsules. The species is considered to be not threatened.

== Taxonomy ==
Plantago triandrais in the plant family Plantaginaceae. It was first described by Swedish botanist Sven Berggren in 1877.

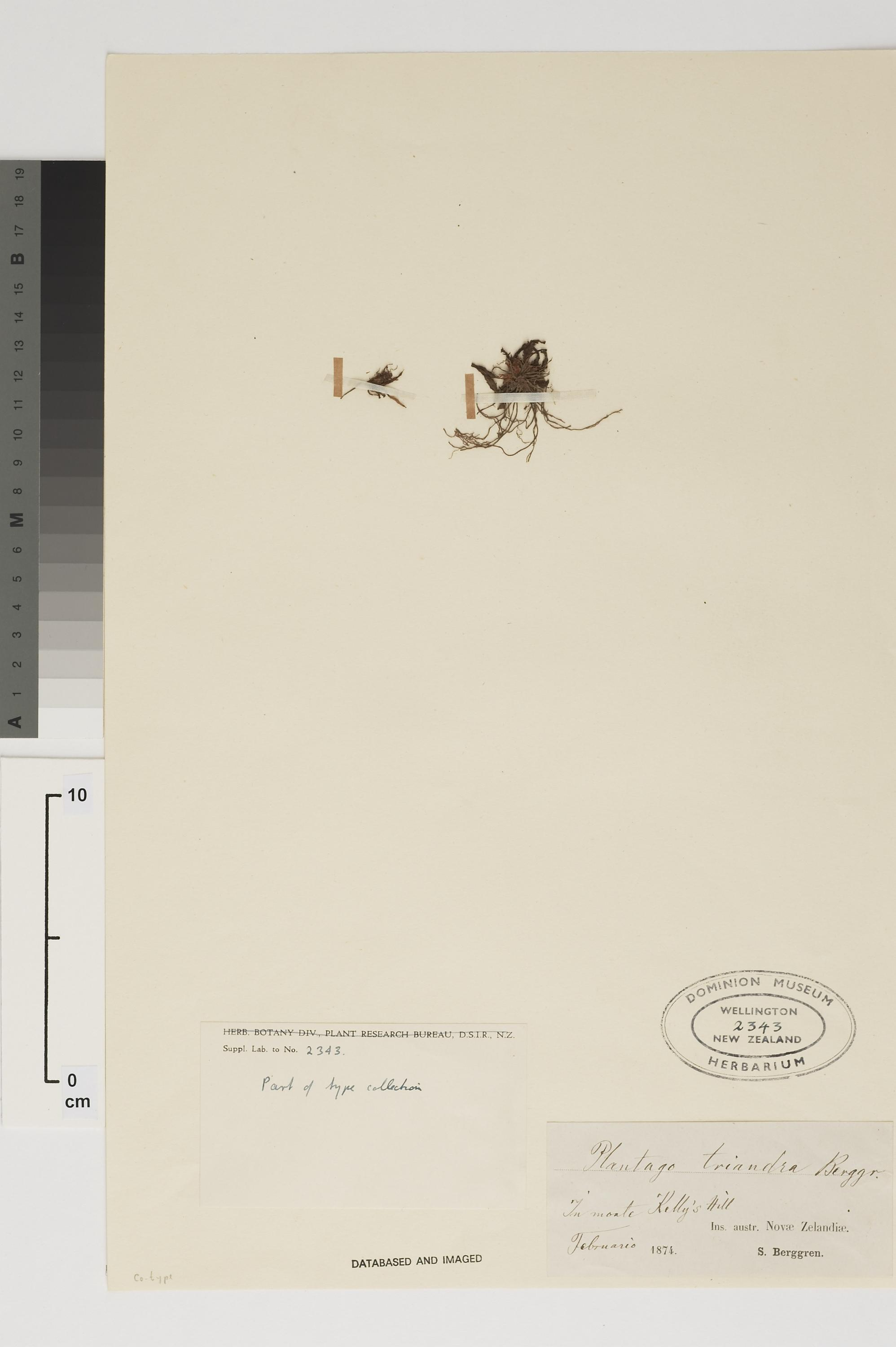
Possible isotype of P. triandra at Te Papa

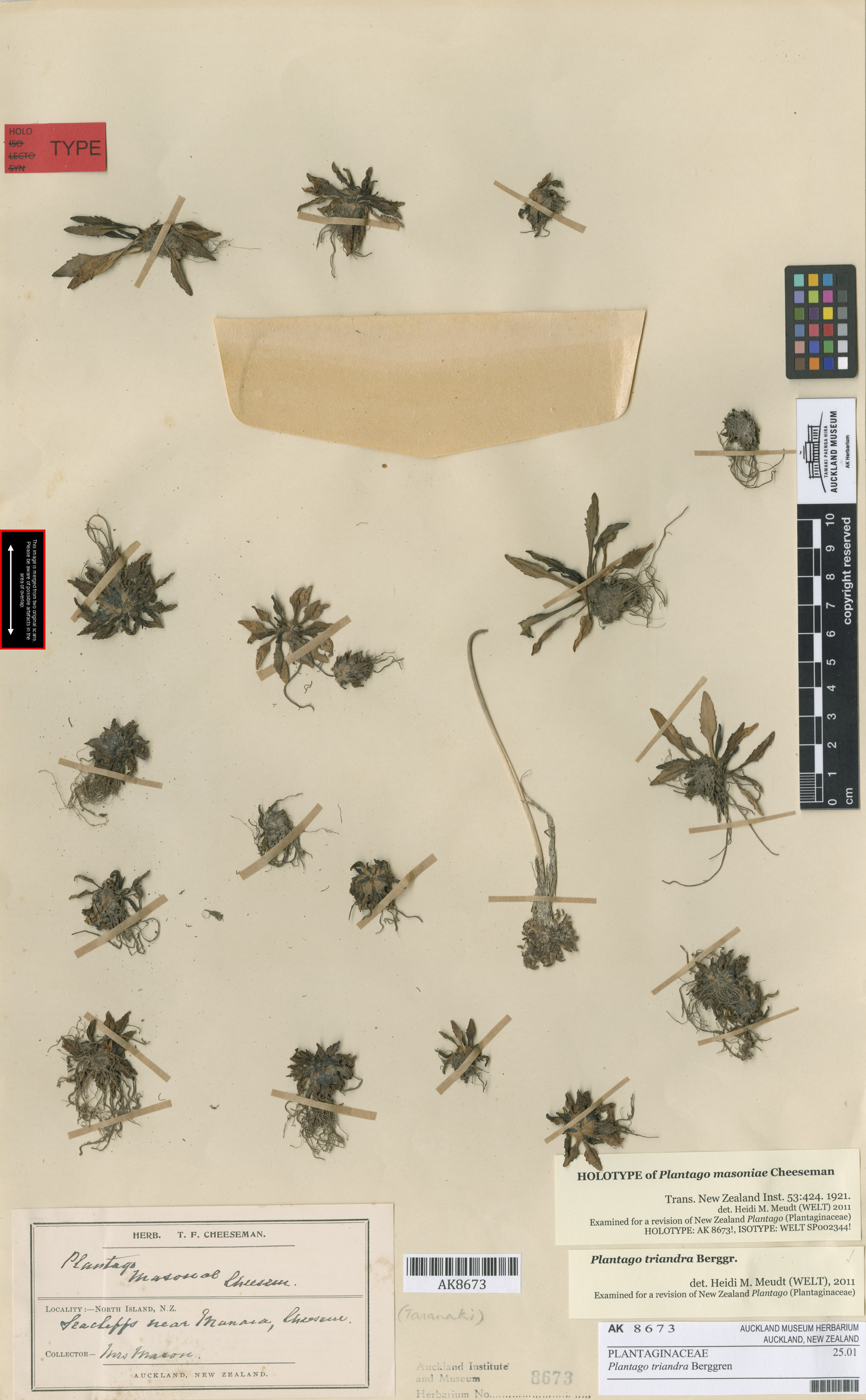
Holotype of P. masoniae, a synonym of P. triandra, from Auckland Museum herbarium

The holotype was collected by Sven Berggren at Kelly's Hill, Canterbury, South Island in February 1874. The holotype is located at the herbarium at Lund University Biological Museum (LD), and there are possible isotypes at herbaria at Royal Botanical Gardens, Kew (K) and the Museum of New Zealand Te Papa Tongarewa (WELT).

Plantago masoniae Cheeseman and P. triandra subsp. masoniae (Cheeseman) W.R.Sykes are considered to be synonyms of P. triandra. The holotype of P. masoniae is housed at the Auckland War Memorial Museum (AK).

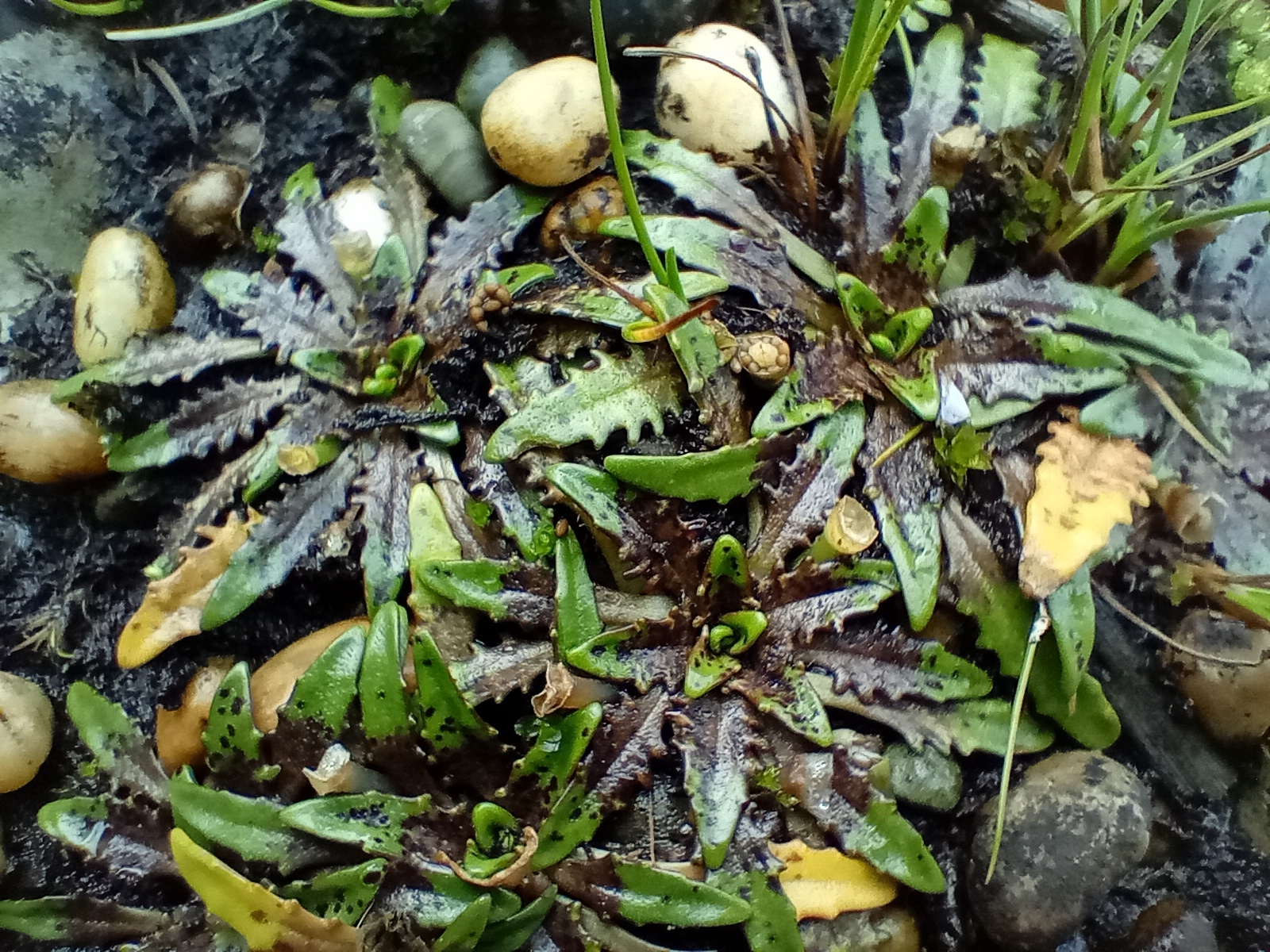
Plantago triandra in fruit

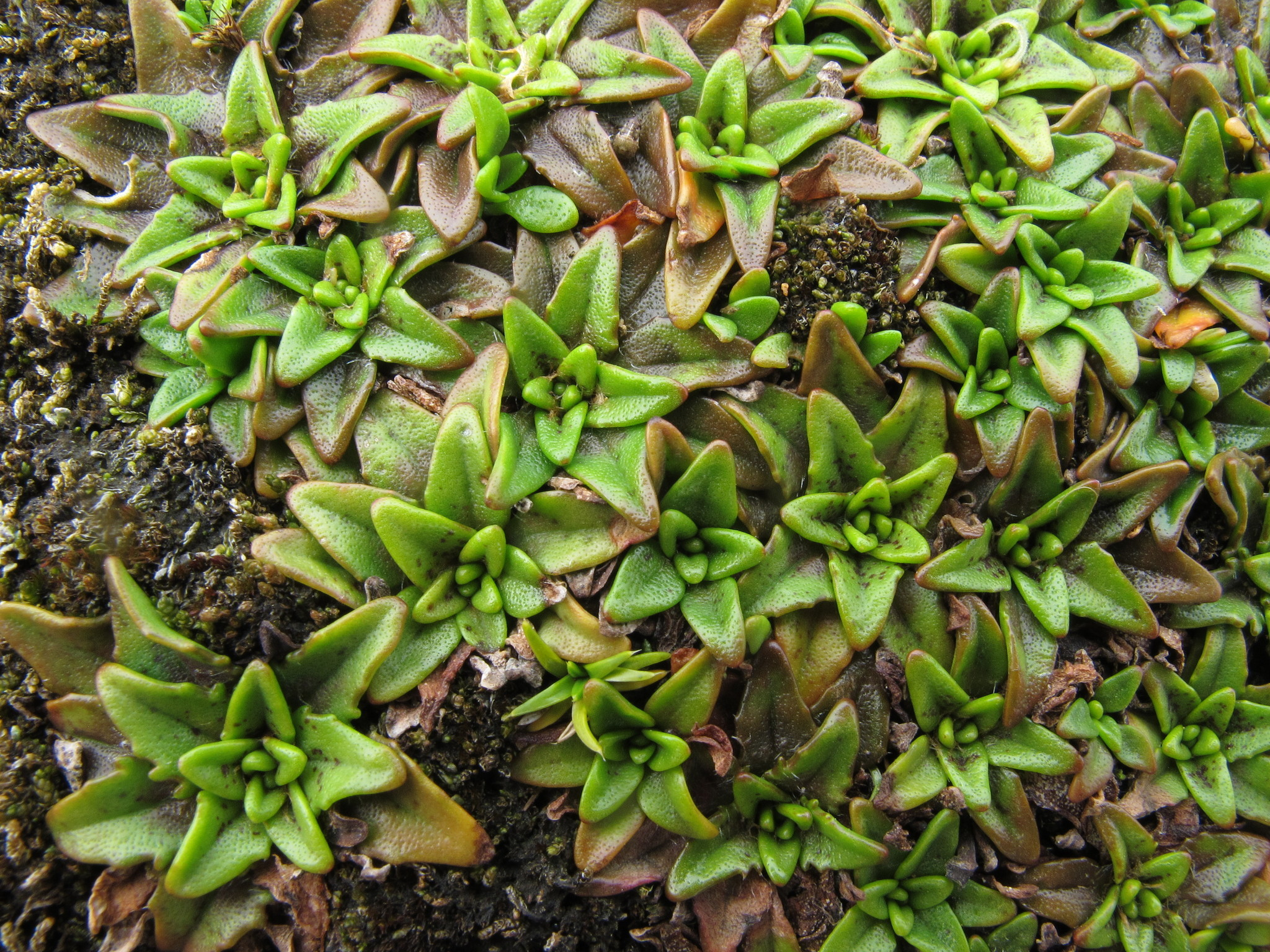
Mat of Plantago triandra rosettes

Plantago triandra is morphologically most similar to P. obconica and P. unibracteata. It can be distinguished from those species and other New Zealand Plantago species by tiny calyx and many seeds. The calyx of P. triandra is very tiny, only 0.4–1.8 mm long, which is smaller than that of the other species. It also has between 8 and 42 uniform, angular seeds in each capsule (average 26) which is more than the other species.

It can be further distinguished from P. obconica by its leaves which are widest below the middle (rather than above the middle). It can be further distinguished from P. unibracteata by its many leaf teeth, usually 10 or more (rather than 4–10 leaf teeth).

== Description ==
Plantago triandra plants are small rosettes with a primary root up to 12 mm thick, with up to 62 usually angular-ovate leaves, and with visible, short (<13 mm long), rust-coloured leaf axillary hairs in the basal rosette. The leaves have 1 vein, are 8–61 mm long (including petiole) and up to 11 mm wide, sometimes punctate, glabrous on both surfaces or with bands of hairs to sparsely hairy on the upper surface. The leaf has an acute apex, and its edges are smooth, wavy or with up to 24 small to large teeth. The petiole is usually distinguishable from the leaf lamina, and up to 23 mm long. Each rosette plant has up to 22 erect inflorescences which can be up to 41 mm long. The scapes are smooth and glabrous or hairy. The spikes are globose with 1–3 densely crowded flowers. Each flower has a small bract that is broadly ovate to very broadly ovate and usually glabrous. The calyx is 0.3–1.7 mm long, 0.3–1.1 mm wide, mostly glabrous but rarely with a hair at the apex. The corolla tube is 2.0–4.4 mm long, corolla lobes 0.9–2.9 mm long, stamen filaments 1.7–6.8 mm long, anthers 0.7–1.4 mm long, and style 2.7–10.0 mm long and densely hairy. The ovary is 0.7–2.6 mm long, with up to 42 ovules. The fruit is a dry, dehiscent capsule with circumsessile dehiscence, ellipsoid or globose, widest at middle, 2.1–4.3 mm long and 1.5–3.9 mm wide. Each capsule has 8–42 uniform rust or brown seeds 0.5–1.4 mm long, usually rhomboid or angular-ovoid.

Plantago triandra flowers from December to May and fruits from December to June.

The chromosome number of Plantago triandra is 2n=48.

== Distribution and habitat ==
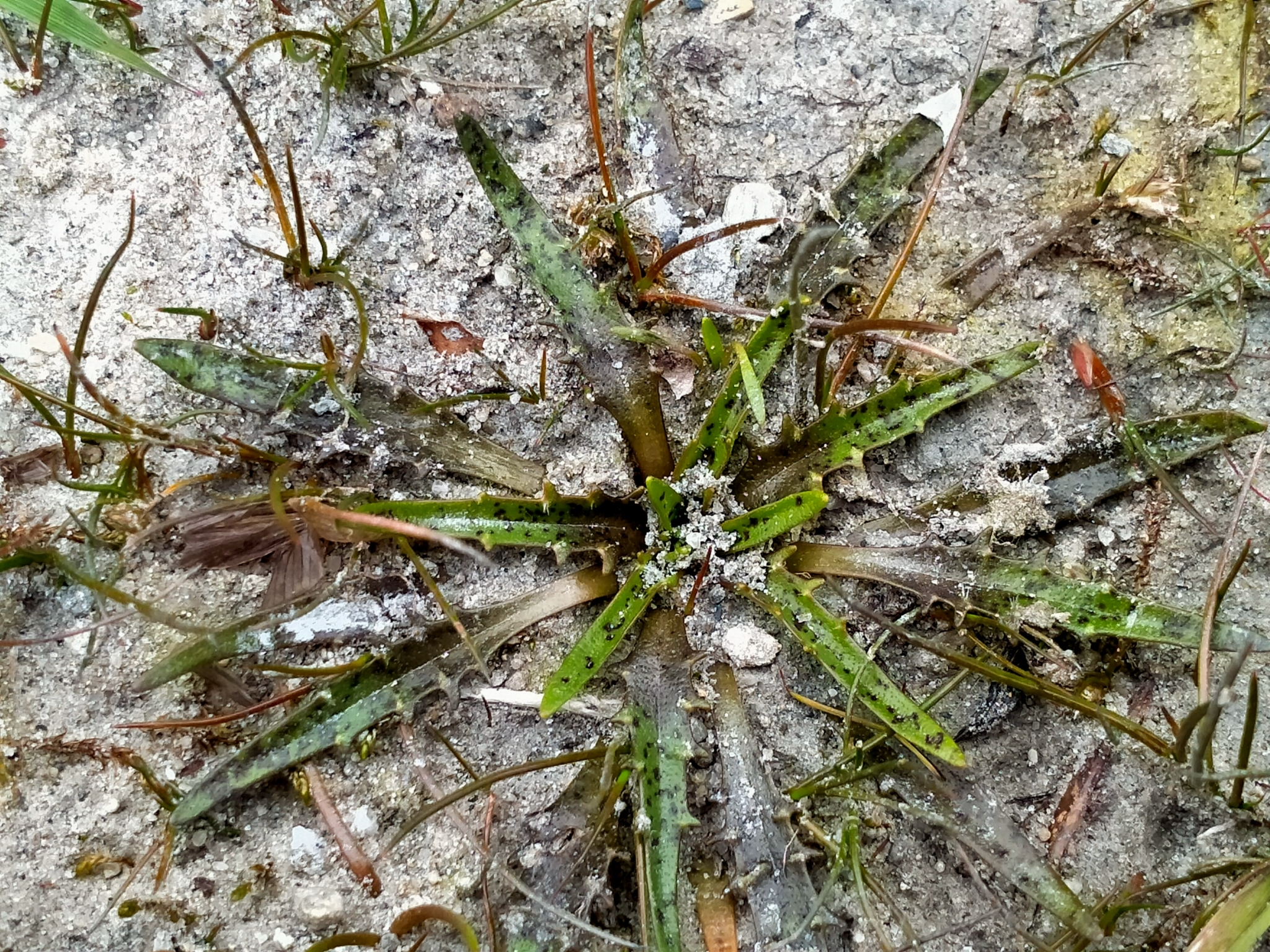
P. triandra rosettes in riverside herbaceous turf

Plantago triandra is a plantain that is endemic to the North, South, Stewart and Chatham Islands of New Zealand. In the North Island it is found in Auckland, Volcanic Plateau, Taranaki, and Southern North Island regions, whereas on the South Island it is found in Marlborough, Western Nelson, Westland, Canterbury, Otago, Fiordland, and Southland regions.

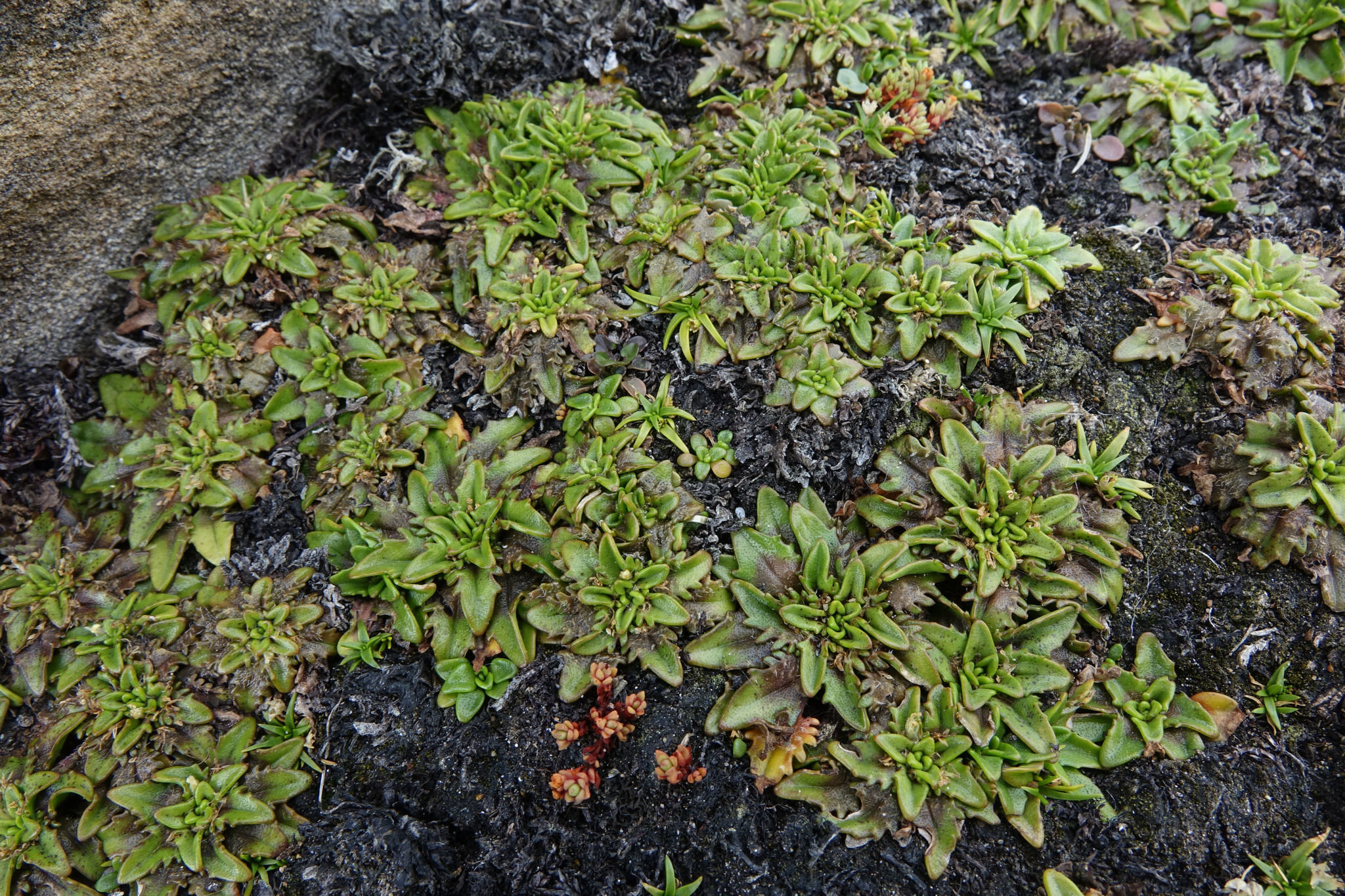
Plantago rosettes in a coastal turf habitat

It is found on coastal banks, cliffs, herbfields, dunes and rock outcrops in damp or wet areas, from sea level to 1,520 m (4,990 ft) above sea level. It can also be found in bowling or golf course greens.

== Phylogeny ==
Plantago triandra was included in phylogenetic analyses of Australasian species of Plantago using standard DNA sequencing markers (nuclear ribosomal DNA, chloroplast DNA, and mitochondrial DNA regions). In that study, Plantago triandra was moderately to strongly supported as sister or closely related to another New Zealand species, Plantago unibracteata.

Similarly, Plantago triandra was closely related to P. unibracteata in a phylogenetic study of the New Zealand species using amplified fragment length polymorphisms (AFLPs). These two species formed a clade with high support, but the species themselves were not monophyletic. It was hypothesized that decaploid and dodecaploid P. unibracteata are allopolyploids that have evolved multiple times from octoploid P. triandra and another species.

Individuals of P. triandra and P. unibracteata could not be distinguished in another study using only nuclear ribosomal DNA (internal transcribed spacer region) with several individuals of each species sampled. However, the sole individual of P. triandra was not sister to the sole individual of P. unibracteata in another phylogenetic study focusing on Plantago species throughout the world using whole chloroplast genomes, although they were in the same larger clade. Finally, the species was not included in another phylogenetic studies focusing on oceanic island Plantago species using standard DNA sequencing markers.

== Conservation status ==
Plantago triandra is listed as Not Threatened in the most recent assessment (2017–2018) of the New Zealand Threatened Classification for plants.

== Gallery ==
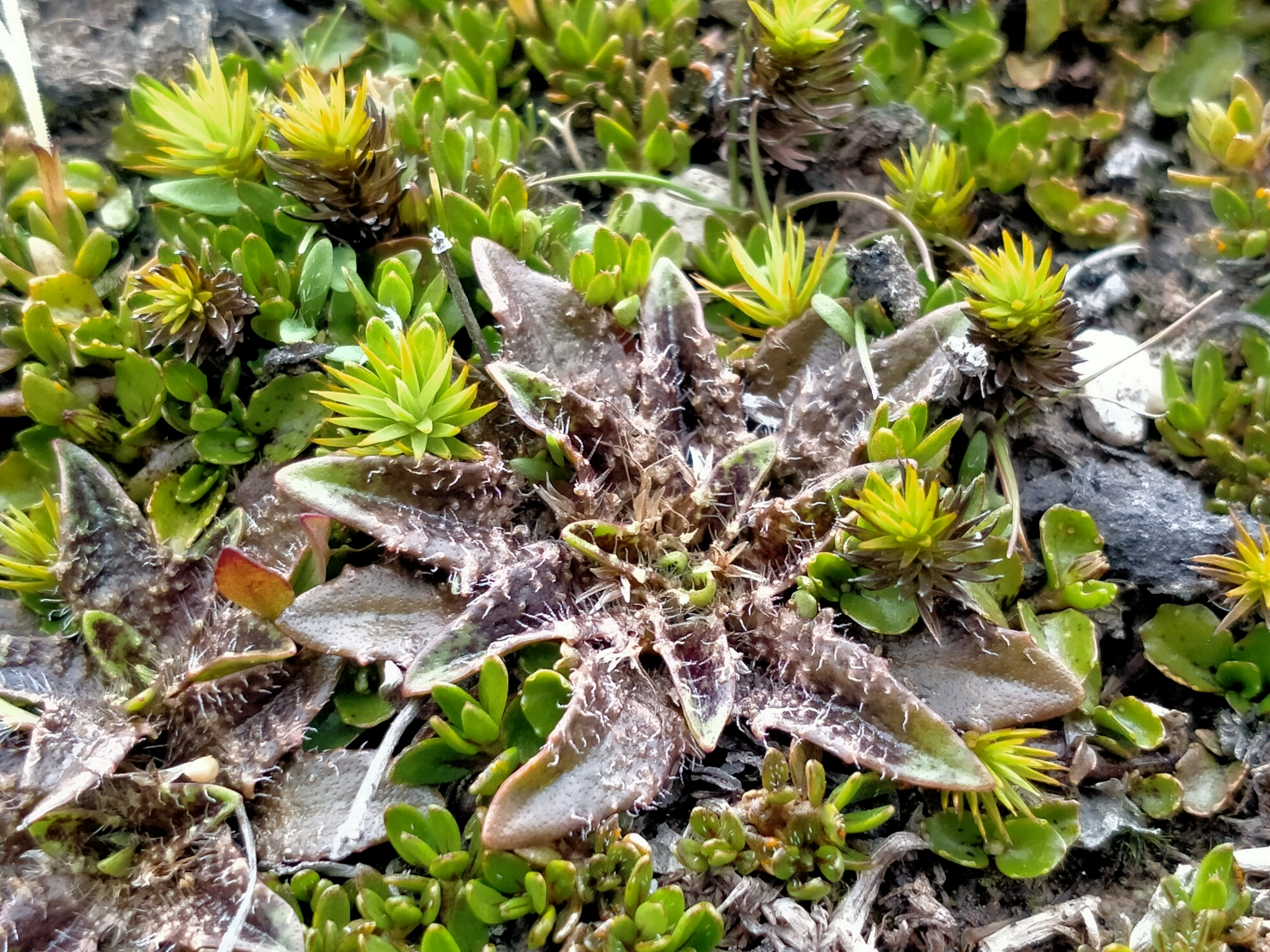

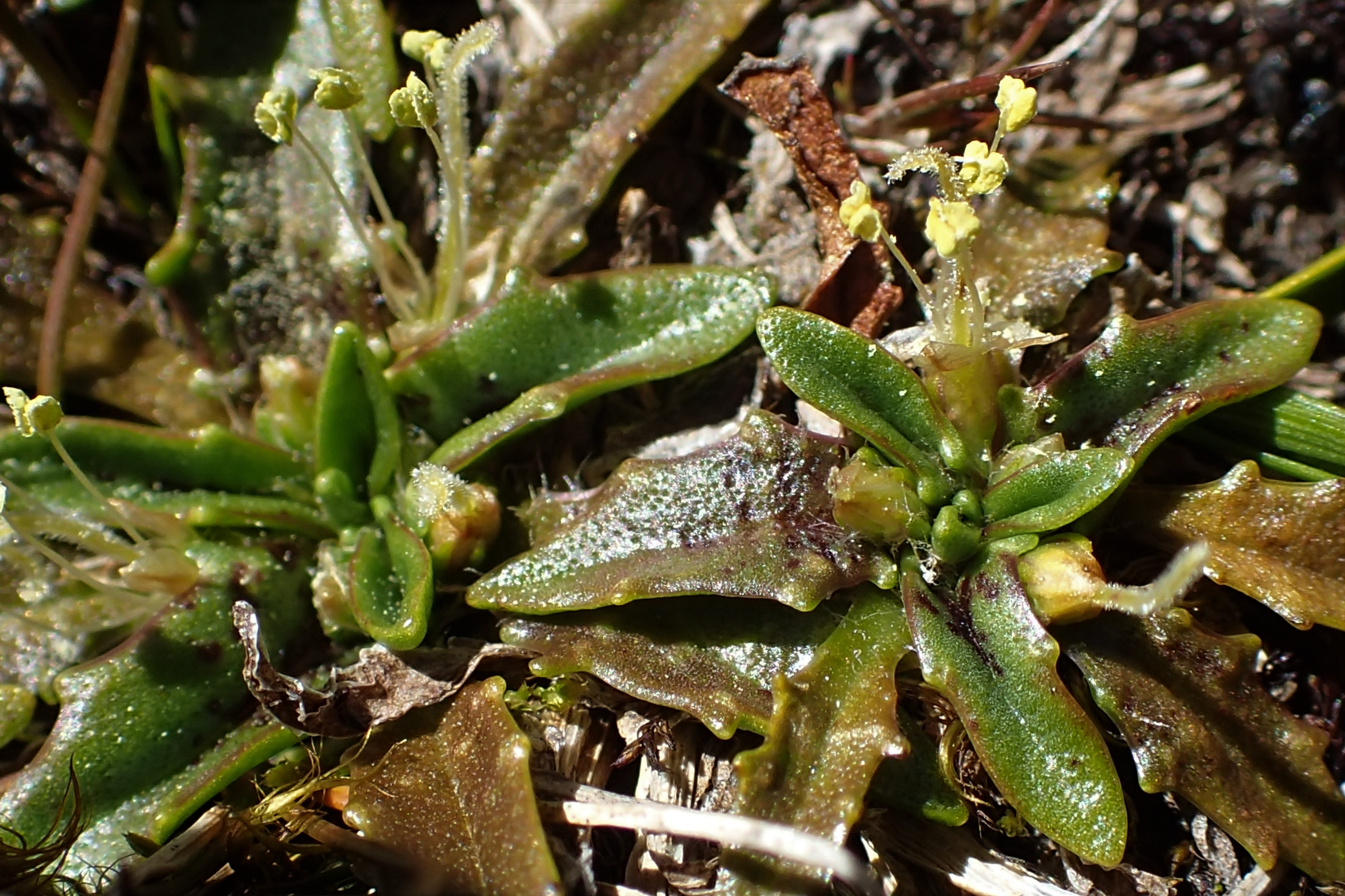

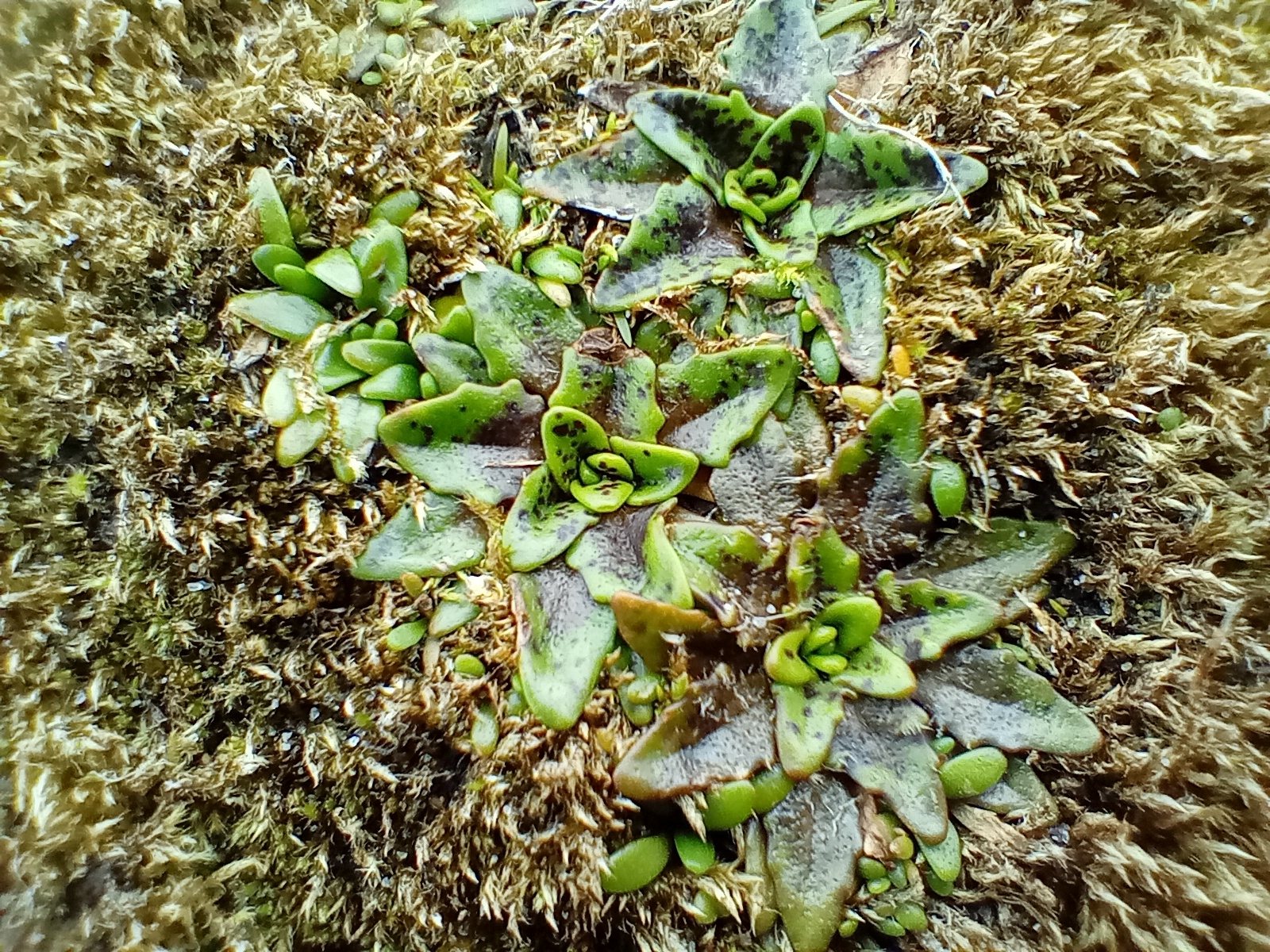

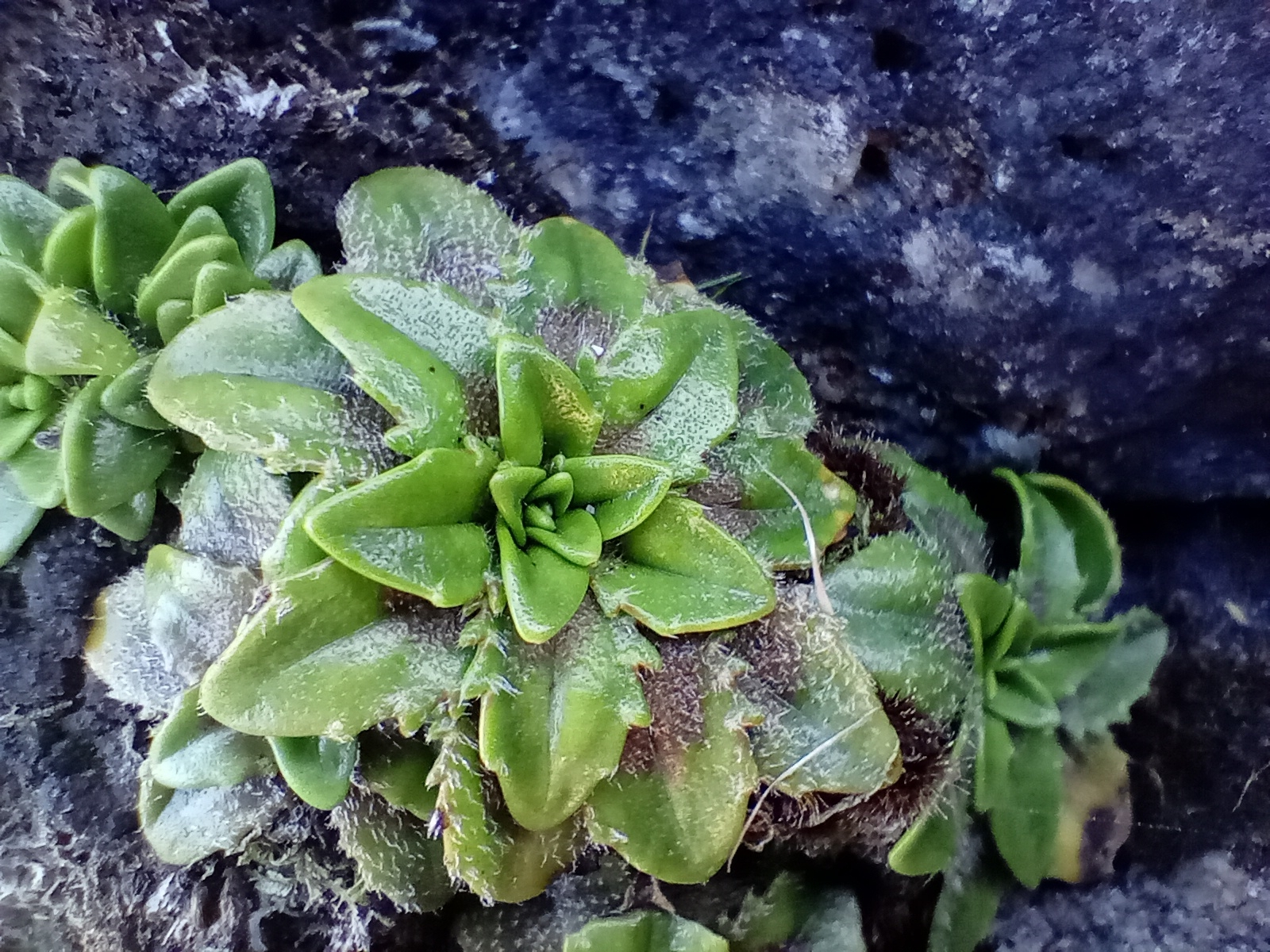

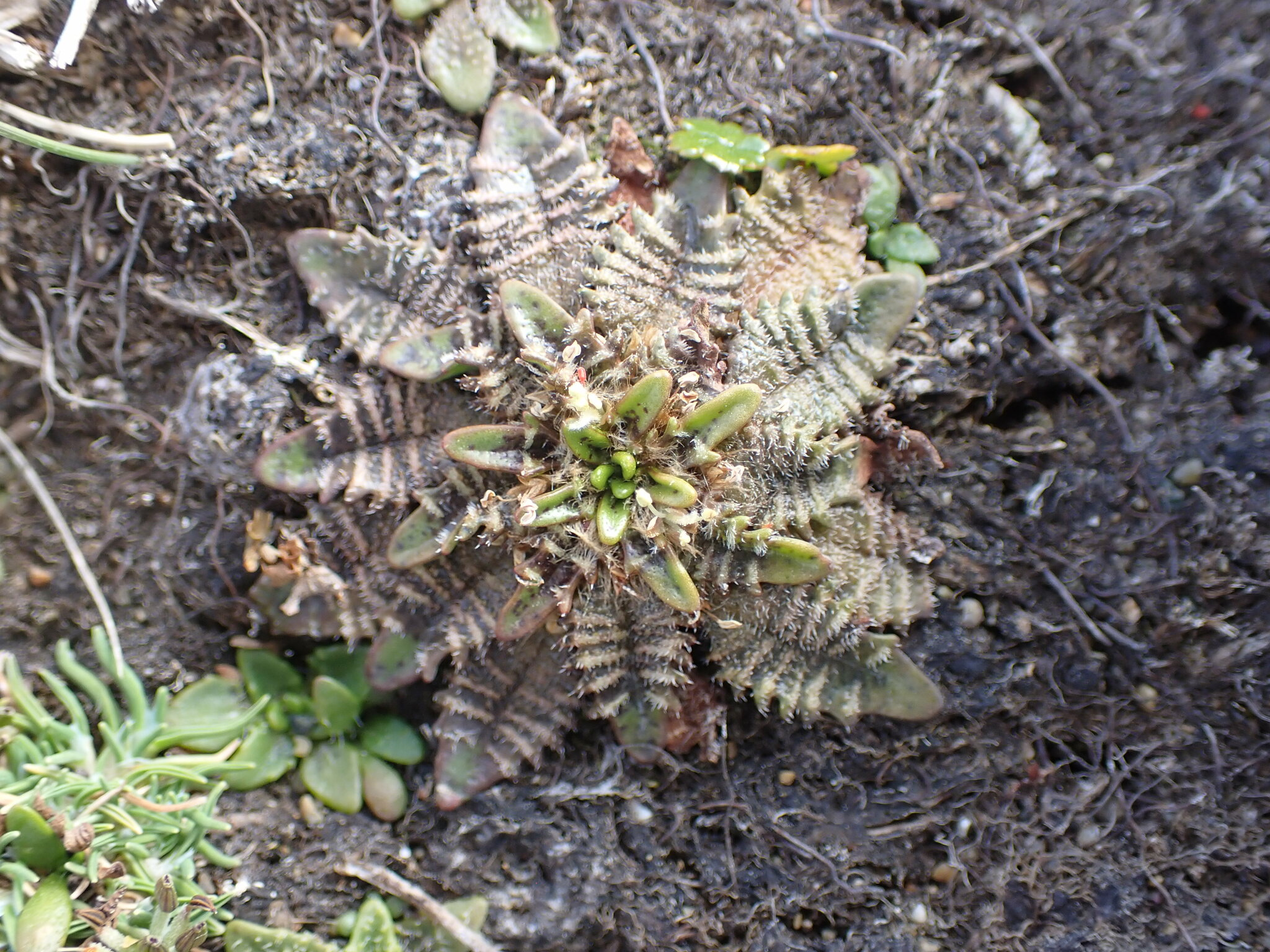

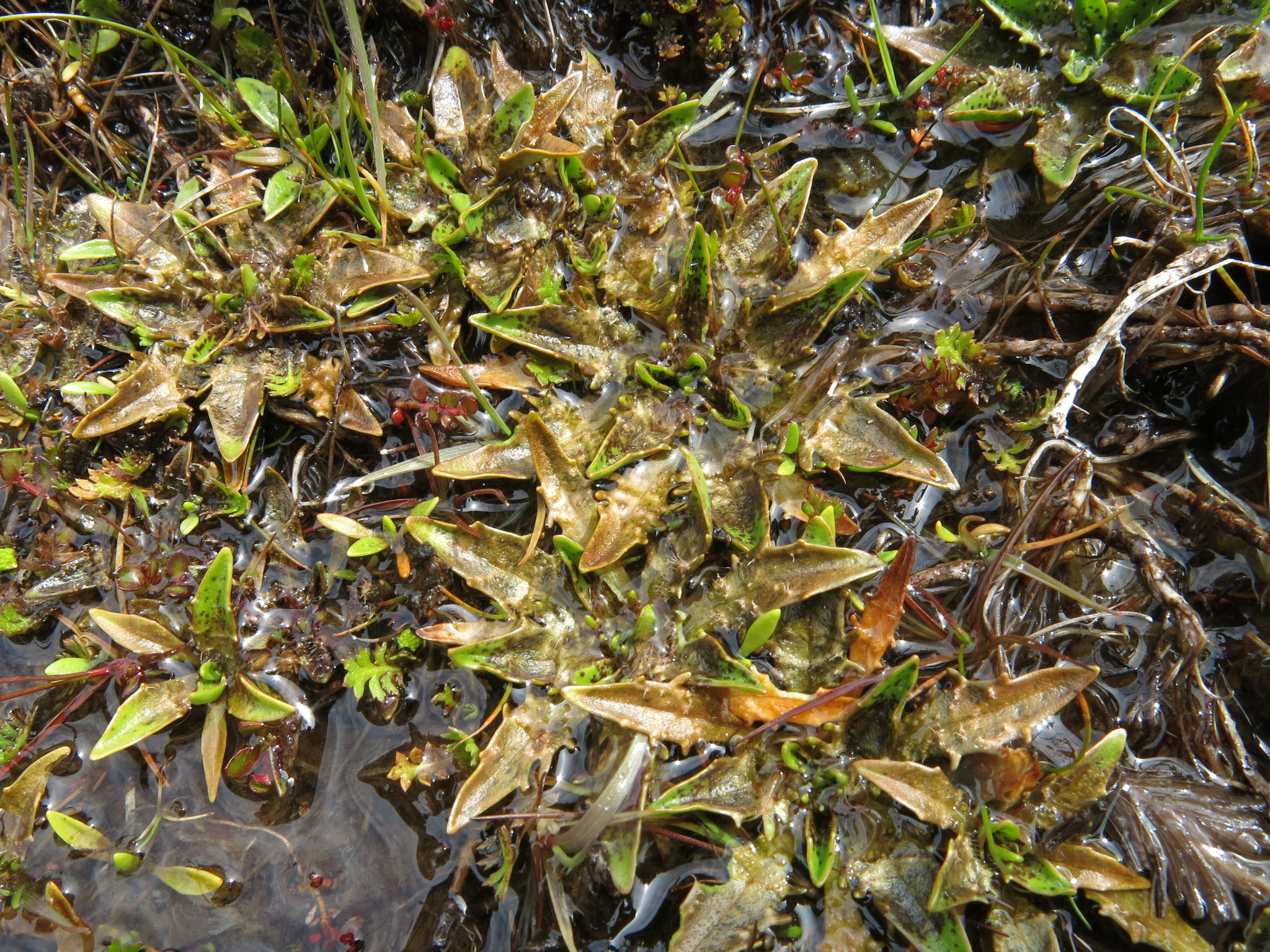
