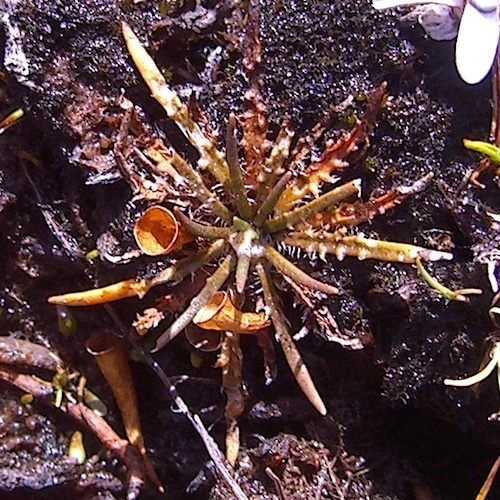
- Plantago obconica plant in fruit from Otago, New Zealand

Conservation status
- Naturally Uncommon (NZ TCS)

Scientific classification
- Kingdom: Plantae
- Clade: Tracheophytes
- Clade: Angiosperms
- Clade: Eudicots
- Clade: Asterids
- Order: Lamiales
- Family: Plantaginaceae
- Genus: Plantago
- Species: P. obconica

Binomial name
- Plantago obconica W.R.Sykes (1988)

= Plantago obconica =

Species of flowering plant in the plantain family

Plantago obconica is a species of flowering plant in the family Plantaginaceae that is endemic to the South Island of New Zealand. William Sykes described the species in 1988. It is the smallest Plantago species in New Zealand. Plants of this species of plantain are perennial with a rosette habit, with very narrow, linear, keeled leaves, and fruiting capsules with a 1-cm long funnel-like base.

== Taxonomy and etymology ==
Plantago obconica W.R.Sykes is in the plant family Plantaginaceae. It was first collected in 1983, and first described by New Zealand botanist William Sykes in 1988.

The holotype was collected by Anthony Druce in 1983 at Mount Somers, Canterbury in the South Island of New Zealand (CHR 389736).

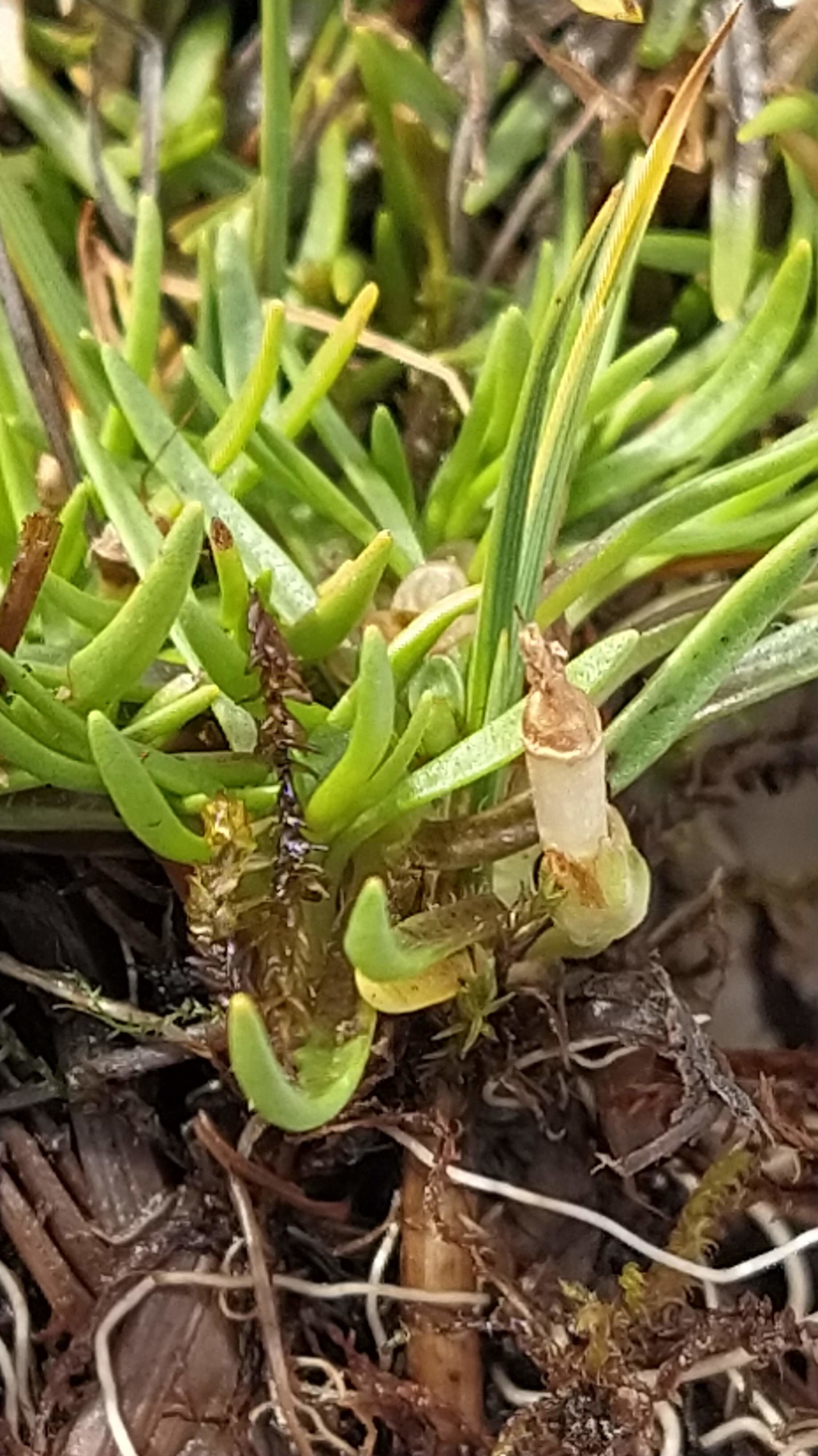
Plantago obconica rosette with elongated capsule base, Otago, New Zealand

The specific epithet refers to the inverted cone or funnel shape of the capsule, which is a distinguishing feature for this species.

Plantago obconica is the smallest plantain in New Zealand, and is morphologically most similar to P. triandra. It can be distinguished from that species and other New Zealand Plantago species by its small rosettes with very narrow, linear, keeled leaves, and its fruiting capsules with a funnel-like base that elongates to over 1 cm long.

== Description ==
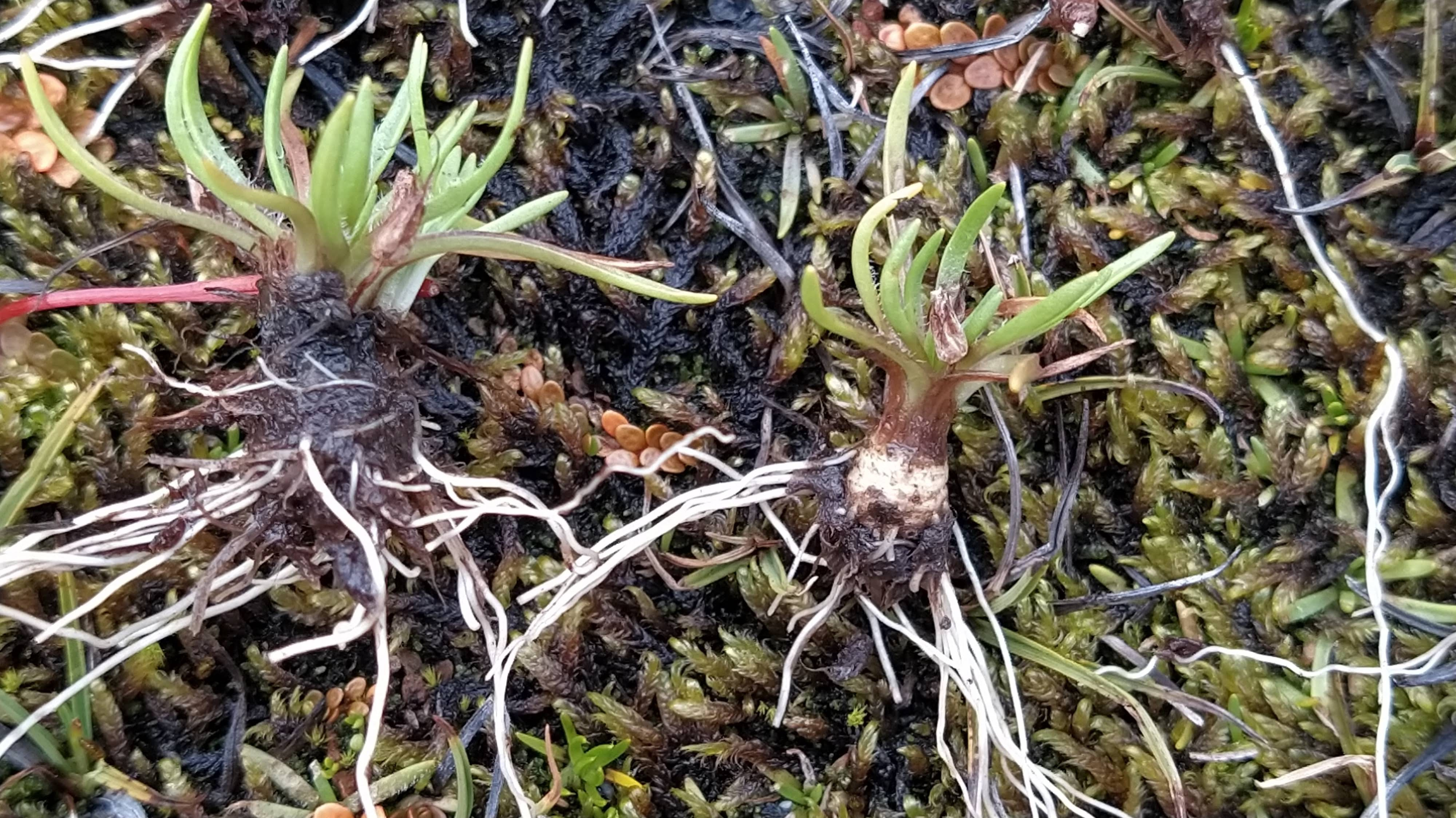
Rosettes and roots of two P. obconica plants

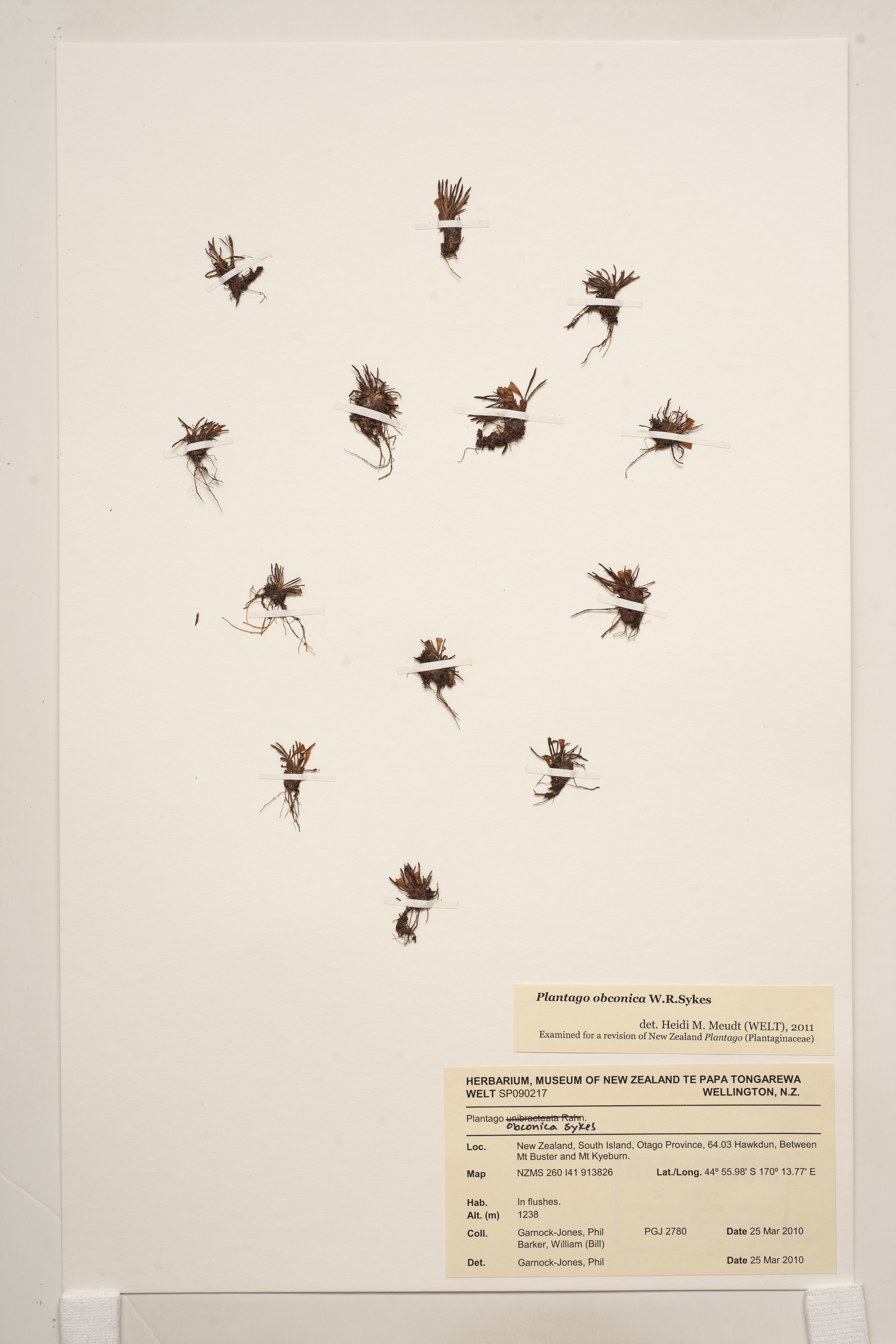
Te Papa herbarium specimen of P. obconica from the South Island, New Zealand

Plantago obconica plants are small rosettes with a primary root up to 6 mm thick, with up to 27 linear leaves, and with visible, short (<7 mm long), rust-coloured leaf axillary hairs in the basal rosette. The leaves have 1 or no veins, are 5–26 mm long (including petiole) and up to 3 mm wide, sometimes punctate, usually glabrous on both surfaces, and sometimes with isolated hairs. The leaf has an acute apex, and its edges are smooth or with up to 12 small teeth. The petiole is usually not distinguishable from the leaf lamina, and up to 7 cm long. Each rosette plant has up to 12 erect inflorescences which can be up to 18 mm long. The scapes are smooth and glabrous but sometimes have appressed glandular hairs near the top. The spikes are globose with 1–8 densely crowded flowers. Each flower has a pair of bracts that are ovate to very broadly ovate and usually glabrous (or sometimes with a few glandular hairs). The calyx is 2.6–4.8 mm long, 1.3–3.0 mm wide, mostly glabrous but sometimes with a few hairs on the margins or midrib. The corolla tube is 2.1–6.2 mm long, corolla lobes 1.0–3.4 mm long, stamen filaments 4.3–5.5 mm long, anthers 1.5–2.0 mm long, and style 3.9–9.3 mm long and densely hairy. The ovary is 0.6–2.2 mm long, with up to 14 ovules. The fruit is a dry, dehiscent capsule with circumsessile dehiscence, narrowly ellipsoid, ellipsoid or narrowly obovoid, widest at or above middle, 2.5–7.2 mm long and 1.3–3.3 mm wide, lower portion sometimes elongating up to 11 mm long. Each capsule has 3–10 uniform rust or brown seeds 0.5–1.1 mm long, usually ellipsoid or broadly ellipsoid.

Plantago obconica flowers in December and January and fruits from January to March

The chromosome number of Plantago obconica is n=12.

== Distribution and habitat ==
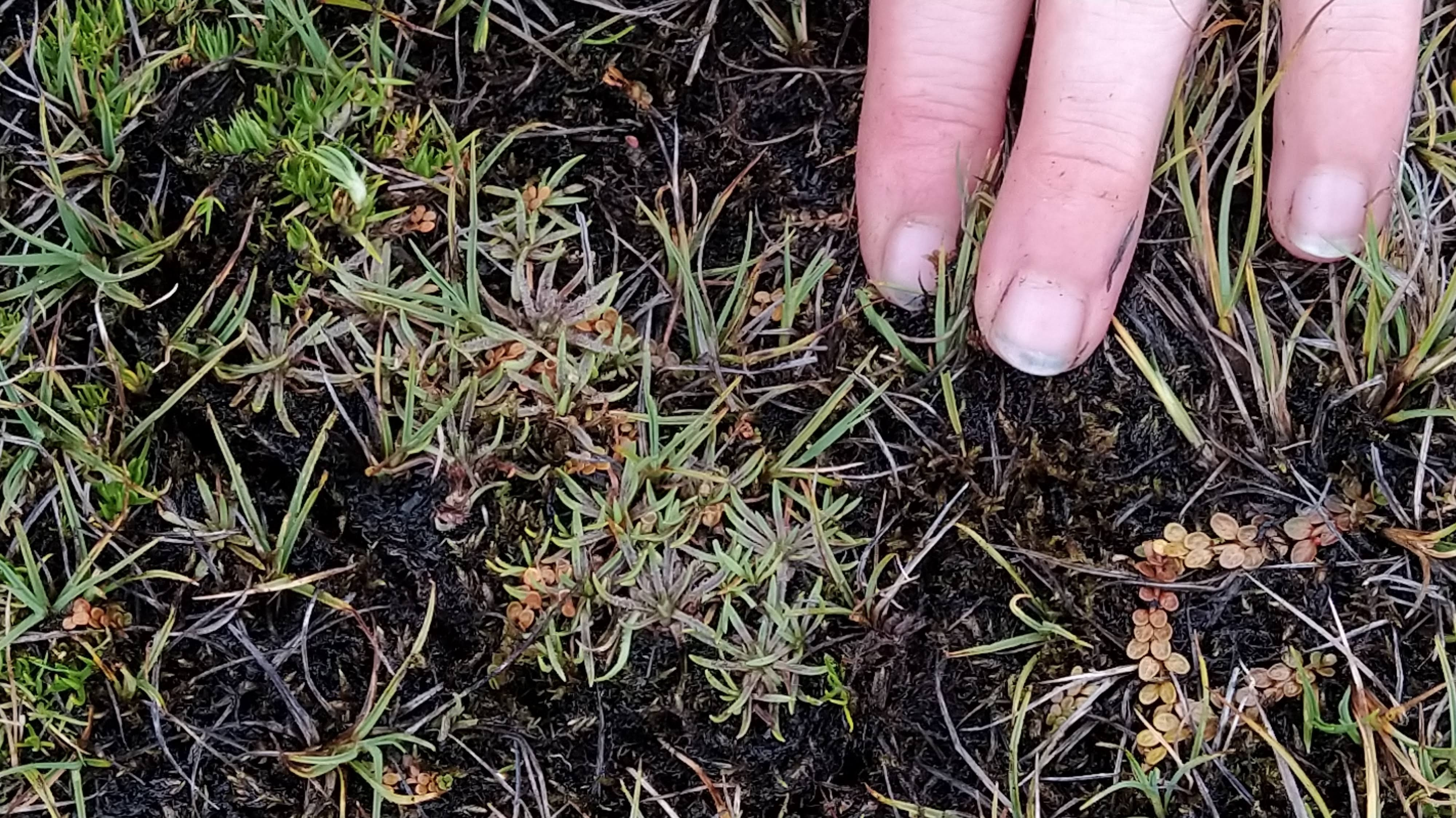
Small rosettes of P. obconica in a high-elevation bog, South Island, New Zealand

Plantago obconica is a plantain that is endemic to the South Island of New Zealand, in Marlborough, Canterbury and Otago.

It is found in high-elevation wetlands, bogs and seepage herbfields, from 1270 to 1740 m above sea level.

== Phylogeny ==
Plantago obconica was included in phylogenetic analyses of Australasian species of Plantago using standard DNA sequencing markers (nuclear ribosomal DNA, chloroplast DNA, and mitochondrial DNA regions). In that study, Plantago obconica was moderately to strongly supported as sister to another New Zealand diploid species, Plantago lanigera, and these two species were in turn sister to P. aucklandica.

Similarly, Plantago obconica closely related to P. lanigera, P. novae-zelandiae and P. aucklandica in a phylogenetic study of the New Zealand species using amplified fragment length polymorphisms (AFLPs). However, the species was not included in other phylogenetic studies focusing on Plantago species throughout the world using whole chloroplast genomes or standard DNA sequencing markers.

== Conservation status ==
Plantago obconica is listed as At Risk - Naturally Uncommon in the most recent assessment (2017-2018) of the New Zealand Threatened Classification for plants. It also has the qualifiers "RR" (Range Restricted), "Sp" (Sparse) and "DP" (Data Poor).
